= List of Yugoslavian Athletics Championships winners =

The Yugoslavian Athletics Championships was an annual outdoor track and field competition organised by the Athletic Federation of Yugoslavia, which served as the Yugoslavian national championship for the sport. The competition lasted from 1920 to 2002.

Starting as the championship for the Kingdom of Yugoslavia, it continued through to its successor, the Socialist Federal Republic of Yugoslavia, which was made up of six socialist republics – Bosnia and Herzegovina, Croatia, Macedonia, Montenegro, Serbia, and Slovenia. The gradual breakup of Yugoslavia saw Slovenia and Croatia leave, and consequently hold their own national championships from 1992 onwards, and Macedonia and Bosnia and Herzegovina broke away soon after. From 1992 the Yugoslavian Championships included athletes from Serbia and Montenegro only, and the country was renamed Serbia and Montenegro in 2003, bringing an end to the Yugoslavian era.

== Men ==
=== 100 metres ===
- 1922: Stanko Perpar
- 1923: Stanko Perpar
- 1927: Stanko Perpar
- 1952: Stanko Lorger
- 1956: Stanko Lorger
- 1958: Stanko Lorger
- 1959: Stanko Lorger
- 1960: Stanko Lorger
- 1961: Stanko Lorger
- 1962: Josip Šarić
- 1963: Srbobran Pavlović
- 1964: Ivan Karasi
- 1965: Srbobran Pavlović
- 1966: Ivan Karasi
- 1967: Jovan Mušković
- 1968: Ivan Karasi
- 1969: Ivan Karasi
- 1970: Jovan Mušković
- 1971: Predrag Križan
- 1972: Borisav Pisić
- 1973: Miro Kocuvan
- 1974: Borisav Pisić
- 1975: Borisav Pisić
- 1976: Borisav Pisić
- 1977: Dragan Zarić
- 1978: Dragan Zarić
- 1979: Dragan Zarić
- 1980: Aleksandar Popović
- 1981: Aleksandar Popović
- 1982: Lazar Staničić
- 1983: Lazar Staničić
- 1984: Mladen Nikolić
- 1985: Mladen Nikolić
- 1986: Mladen Nikolić
- 1987: Simon Rudež
- 1988: Dušan Marković
- 1989: Milan Petaković
- 1990: Milan Petaković
- 1991: Milan Petaković
- 1992: Slobodan Branković
- 1993: Slobodan Branković
- 1994: Aleksandar Tomić
- 1995: Dejan Nedić
- 1996: Aleksandar Tomić
- 1997: Aleksandar Popović
- 1998: Dejan Nedić
- 1999: Slobodan Spasić
- 2000: Miloš Šakić
- 2001: Marko Janković
- 2002: Marko Janković

=== 200 metres ===
- 1922: Stanko Perpar
- 1923: Stanko Perpar
- 1927: Stanko Perpar
- 1960: Miloje Grujić
- 1961: Đani Kovač
- 1962: Josip Šarić
- 1963: Srbobran Pavlović
- 1964: Ivan Karasi
- 1965: Miroslav Bosnar
- 1966: Predrag Križan
- 1967: Predrag Križan
- 1968: Miro Kocuvan
- 1969: Predrag Križan
- 1970: Miro Kocuvan
- 1971: Miro Kocuvan
- 1972: Miro Kocuvan
- 1973: Miro Kocuvan
- 1974: Predrag Križan
- 1975: Josip Alebić
- 1976: Josip Alebić
- 1977: Josip Alebić
- 1978: Dragan Zarić
- 1979: Željko Knapić
- 1980: Aleksandar Popović
- 1981: Željko Knapić
- 1982: Željko Knapić
- 1983: Mladen Nikolić
- 1984: Mladen Nikolić
- 1985: Željko Knapić
- 1986: Mladen Nikolić
- 1987: Željko Knapić
- 1988: Slobodan Branković
- 1989: Slobodan Branković
- 1990: Slobodan Branković
- 1991: Dejan Jovković
- 1992: Dejan Jovković
- 1993: Slobodan Branković
- 1994: Nenad Djurović
- 1995: Dejan Nedić
- 1996: Dejan Nedić
- 1997: Miloš Bošnjak
- 1998: Predrag Momirović
- 1999: Predrag Momirović
- 2000: Marko Janković
- 2001: Slobodan Spasić
- 2002: Marko Janković

=== 400 metres ===
- 1960: Miloje Grujić
- 1961: Đani Kovač
- 1962: Miroslav Bosnar
- 1963: Anton Stanovnik
- 1964: Miroslav Bosnar
- 1965: Miroslav Bosnar
- 1966: Sam Bugri (GHA)
- 1967: Stjepan Kremer
- 1968: Stjepan Kremer
- 1969: Luciano Sušanj
- 1970: Miro Kocuvan
- 1971: Miro Kocuvan
- 1972: Josip Alebić
- 1973: Luciano Sušanj
- 1974: Josip Alebić
- 1975: Josip Alebić
- 1976: Josip Alebić
- 1977: Josip Alebić
- 1978: Željko Knapić
- 1979: Josip Alebić
- 1980: Josip Alebić
- 1981: Josip Alebić
- 1982: Jozsef Keresy
- 1983: Ismail Mačev
- 1984: Željko Knapić
- 1985: Željko Knapić
- 1986: Ismail Mačev
- 1987: Ismail Mačev
- 1988: Ismail Mačev
- 1989: Slobodan Branković
- 1990: Nenad Djurović
- 1991: Dejan Jovković
- 1992: Dejan Jovković
- 1993: Nenad Djurović
- 1994: Nenad Djurović
- 1995: Siniša Peša
- 1996: Siniša Peša
- 1997: Branislav Stojanović
- 1998: Branislav Stojanović
- 1999: Siniša Peša
- 2000: Siniša Peša
- 2001: Marko Janković
- 2002: Žarko Mandić

=== 800 metres ===
- 1960: Borut Ingolić
- 1961: Borut Ingolić
- 1962: Martin Štajner
- 1963: Dragutin Rubežić
- 1964: Simo Važić
- 1965: Dragutin Rubežić
- 1966: Jože Međimurec
- 1967: Ivan Jokić
- 1968: Jože Međimurec
- 1969: Jože Međimurec
- 1970: Jože Međimurec
- 1971: Jože Međimurec
- 1972: Jože Međimurec
- 1973: Luciano Sušanj
- 1974: Luciano Sušanj
- 1975: Luciano Sušanj
- 1976: Milovan Savić
- 1977: Dragan Životić
- 1978: Milovan Savić
- 1979: Milovan Savić
- 1980: Milovan Savić
- 1981: Dragan Životić
- 1982: Milovan Savić
- 1983: Dragan Zdravković
- 1984: Robert Šikonja
- 1985: Slobodan Popović
- 1986: Slobodan Popović
- 1987: Saša Stojilović
- 1988: Slobodan Popović
- 1989: Slobodan Popović
- 1990: Slobodan Popović
- 1991: Veselin Vlahović
- 1992: Slobodan Popović
- 1993: Dejan Pajkić
- 1994: Slobodan Popović
- 1995: Dejan Pajkić
- 1996: Đorđe Milić
- 1997: Darko Radomirović
- 1998: Darko Radomirović
- 1999: Đorđe Milić
- 2000: Darko Radomirović
- 2001: Darko Radomirović
- 2002: Darko Radomirović

=== 1500 metres ===
- 1960: Simo Važić
- 1961: Borut Ingolić
- 1962: Slavko Špan
- 1963: Simo Važić
- 1964: Simo Važić
- 1965: Drago Žuntar
- 1966: Simo Važić
- 1967: Ivan Jokić
- 1968: Simo Važić
- 1969: Panta Maksimović
- 1970: Miodrag Vukomanović
- 1971: Jože Medjimurec
- 1972: Vladan Djordjević
- 1973: Miodrag Vukomanović
- 1974: Boško Božinović
- 1975: Boško Božinović
- 1976: Zoran Molović
- 1977: Boško Božinović
- 1978: Milovan Savić
- 1979: Dragan Zdravković
- 1980: Dragan Zdravković
- 1981: Vinko Pokrajcić
- 1982: Dragan Zdravković
- 1983: Dragan Zdravković
- 1984: Vinko Pokrajcić
- 1985: Dragan Zdravković
- 1986: Romeo Živko
- 1987: Vinko Pokrajcić
- 1988: Branko Zorko
- 1989: Branko Zorko
- 1990: Branko Zorko
- 1991: Dejan Pajkić
- 1992: Ljubiša Djokić
- 1993: Ljubiša Djokić
- 1994: Dejan Pajkić
- 1995: Dejan Pajkić
- 1996: Darko Radomirović
- 1997: Darko Radomirović
- 1998: Đorđe Milić
- 1999: Đorđe Milić
- 2000: Darko Radomirović
- 2001: Dejan Pajkić
- 2002: Darko Radomirović

=== 3000 metres ===
- 1947: Petar Šegedin
- 1949: Petar Šegedin
- 1951: Petar Šegedin
- 1952: Petar Šegedin
- 1953: Petar Šegedin
- 1964: Drago Žuntar

=== 5000 metres ===
- 1948: Petar Šegedin
- 1950: Petar Šegedin
- 1960: Ištvan Ivanović
- 1961: Ištvan Ivanović
- 1962: Ištvan Ivanović
- 1963: Drago Žuntar
- 1964: Nedo Farčić
- 1965: Simo Važić
- 1966: Franc Červan
- 1967: Simo Važić
- 1968: Dane Korica
- 1969: Dane Korica
- 1970: Dane Korica
- 1971: Dane Korica
- 1972: Dane Korica
- 1973: Dane Korica
- 1974: Milan Medan
- 1975: Stevan Vulović
- 1976: Milan Medan
- 1977: Zoran Molović
- 1978: Milan Medan
- 1979: Stanko Lisec
- 1980: Dušan Janicijević
- 1981: Stanislav Miklavžina
- 1982: Dragan Zdravković
- 1983: Stanislav Rozman
- 1984: Dragan Sekulić
- 1985: Dragan Sekulić
- 1986: Romeo Živko
- 1987: Junuz Junuzi
- 1988: Dragan Sekulić
- 1989: Romeo Živko
- 1990: Romeo Živko
- 1991: Ljubiša Djokić
- 1992: Goran Raičević
- 1993: Ljubiša Djokić
- 1994: Ljubiša Djokić
- 1995: Dragoslav Prpa
- 1996: Janko Benša
- 1997: Janko Benša
- 1998: Janko Benša
- 1999: Dragoslav Prpa
- 2000: Ivan Cvetanović
- 2001: Sreten Ninković
- 2002: Mirko Petrović

=== 10,000 metres ===
- 1960: Franjo Mihalić
- 1961: Ištvan Ivanović
- 1962: Franc Červan
- 1963: Nedo Farčić
- 1964: Ištvan Ivanović
- 1965: Franc Červan
- 1966: Franc Červan
- 1967: Drago Žuntar
- 1968: Dane Korica
- 1969: Dane Korica
- 1970: Dane Korica
- 1971: Dane Korica
- 1972: Dane Korica
- 1973: Dane Korica
- 1974: Slavko Kuzmanović
- 1975: Slavko Kuzmanović
- 1976: Dušan Janicijević
- 1977: Sead Kondo
- 1978: Stevan Vulović
- 1979: Slavko Kuzmanović
- 1980: Dušan Janicijević
- 1981: Dušan Janicijević
- 1982: Stanislav Rozman
- 1983: Savo Alempić
- 1984: Savo Alempić
- 1985: Stanislav Rozman
- 1986: Milorad Paunović
- 1987: Borisav Dević
- 1988: Mladen Kršek
- 1989: Dragan Sekulić
- 1990: Mladen Kršek
- 1991: Srba Nikolić
- 1992: Goran Raičević
- 1993: Borisav Dević
- 1994: Borisav Dević
- 1995: Borisav Dević
- 1996: Ramiz Taipi
- 1997: Dragoslav Prpa
- 1998: Janko Benša
- 1999: Borisav Dević
- 2000: Ramiz Taipi
- 2001: Sreten Ninković
- 2002: Not held

=== Half marathon ===
The 2000 edition of the Yugoslavian Half Marathon Championships was held on a short course, through the winners remained valid.

- 1994: Aleksandar Milovanović
- 1995: Stefan Stefanović
- 1996: Goran Raičević
- 1997: Borisav Dević
- 1998: Borisav Dević
- 1999: Borisav Dević
- 2000: Ramiz Taipi
- 2001: Sreten Ninković
- 2002: Sreten Ninković

=== Marathon ===
- 1960: Dobrivoje Stojanović
- 1961: Franjo Škrinjar
- 1962: Franjo Škrinjar
- 1963: Not held
- 1964: Ivan Mustapić
- 1965: Not held
- 1966: Ivan Mustapić
- 1967: Ivan Mustapić
- 1968: Milivoje Pešić
- 1969: Milivoj Radojcević
- 1970: Milivoj Radojcević
- 1971: Milivoj Radojcević
- 1972: Dragoslav Gajić
- 1973: Mirko Vujaklija
- 1974: Sead Kondo
- 1975: Numan Ukić
- 1976: Petar Budija
- 1977: Tomislav Ašković
- 1978: Numan Ukić
- 1979: Numan Ukić
- 1980: Vucic Djoković
- 1981: Numan Ukić
- 1982: Tomislav Ašković
- 1983: Marjan Krempl
- 1984: Tomislav Ašković
- 1985: Tomislav Ašković
- 1986: Tomislav Ašković
- 1987: Tomislav Ašković
- 1988: Tomislav Ašković
- 1989: Tomislav Ašković
- 1990: Miroslav Vindiš
- 1991: Roman Kejžar
- 1992: Safet Badić
- 1993: Goran Raičević
- 1994: Borisav Dević
- 1995: Srba Nikolić
- 1996: Miroslav Pavlović
- 1997: Borisav Dević
- 1998: Borisav Dević
- 1999: Željko Petrović
- 2000: Sreten Ninković
- 2001: Sreten Ninković
- 2002: Ramiz Taipi

=== 100K run ===
- 1997: Zoran Janković
- 1998: Zoran Vasić
- 1999: Zoran Vasić
- 2001: Veljko Popović

=== 3000 metres steeplechase ===
- 1960: Franc Hafner
- 1961: Franc Hafner
- 1962: Franc Hafner
- 1963: Slavko Špan
- 1964: Dušan Bogunović
- 1965: Slavko Špan
- 1966: Slavko Špan
- 1967: Panta Maksimović
- 1968: Slobodan Mitić
- 1969: Panta Maksimović
- 1970: Miroslav Pavlović
- 1971: Milan Tomić
- 1972: Marinko Jukić
- 1973: Peter Svet
- 1974: Peter Svet
- 1975: Milan Vitasović
- 1976: Metod Žužek
- 1977: Milan Kotnik
- 1978: Metod Žužek
- 1979: Peter Svet
- 1980: Bilko Kacar
- 1981: Vinko Pokrajcić
- 1982: Vinko Pokrajcić
- 1983: Vinko Pokrajcić
- 1984: Vinko Pokrajcić
- 1985: Milomir Jović
- 1986: Slobodan Crnokrak
- 1987: Slobodan Crnokrak
- 1988: Vule Maksimović
- 1989: Vule Maksimović
- 1990: Vule Maksimović
- 1991: Vule Maksimović
- 1992: Vule Maksimović
- 1993: Predrag Mladenović
- 1994: Vule Maksimović
- 1995: Vule Maksimović
- 1996: Vule Maksimović
- 1997: Dejan Bogicević
- 1998: Dejan Bogicević
- 1999: Dejan Bogicević
- 2000: Dejan Bogicević
- 2001: Dejan Bogicević
- 2002: Dejan Bogicević

=== 110 metres hurdles ===
- 1950
- 1951:
- 1952: Stanko Lorger
- 1953:
- 1954: Stanko Lorger
- 1955: Stanko Lorger
- 1956: Stanko Lorger
- 1957: Stanko Lorger
- 1958: Stanko Lorger
- 1959: Stanko Lorger
- 1960: Stanko Lorger
- 1961: Stanko Lorger
- 1962: Stanko Lorger
- 1963: Milad Petrušić
- 1964: Milad Petrušić
- 1965: Milad Petrušić
- 1966: Milad Petrušić
- 1967: Sead Ajanović
- 1968: Sead Ajanović
- 1969: Dragan Stoicević
- 1970: Dragan Stoicević
- 1971: Dragan Stoicević
- 1972: Borisav Pisić
- 1973: Borisav Pisić
- 1974: Borisav Pisić
- 1975: Borisav Pisić
- 1976: Borisav Pisić
- 1977: Petar Vukičević
- 1978: Borisav Pisić
- 1979: Borisav Pisić
- 1980: Borisav Pisić
- 1981: Borisav Pisić
- 1982: Petar Vukičević
- 1983: Borisav Pisić
- 1984: Petar Vukičević
- 1985: Petar Vukičević
- 1986: Aleš Kolar
- 1987: Aleš Kolar
- 1988: Željko Grabušić
- 1989: Petar Vukičević
- 1990: Nedeljko Višnjić
- 1991: Mirko Marjanović
- 1992: Slavoljub Nikolić
- 1993: Mirko Marjanović
- 1994: Dragiša Jovanović
- 1995: Slavoljub Nikolić
- 1996: Slavoljub Nikolić
- 1997: Slavoljub Nikolić
- 1998: Vladimir Micić
- 1999: Mirko Marjanović
- 2000: Nenad Lončar
- 2001: Miroslav Novaković
- 2002: Miroslav Novaković

=== 400 metres hurdles ===
- 1960: Đani Kovač
- 1961: Momcilo Matić
- 1962: Đani Kovač
- 1963: Momcilo Matić
- 1964: Đani Kovač
- 1965: Đani Kovač
- 1966: Miran Polutnik
- 1967: Nikola Vojnov
- 1968: Ivica Matijević
- 1969: Zoran Majstorović
- 1970: Ivica Matijević
- 1971: Nikola Vojnov
- 1972: Djordje Stefanović
- 1973: Janez Penca
- 1974: Djordje Stefanović
- 1975: Janez Penca
- 1976: Janez Penca
- 1977: Anton Gluhak
- 1978: Rok Kopitar
- 1979: Rok Kopitar
- 1980: Rok Kopitar
- 1981: Suvad Kestenović
- 1982: Rok Kopitar
- 1983: Rok Kopitar
- 1984: Rok Kopitar
- 1985: Rok Kopitar
- 1986: Rok Kopitar
- 1987: Branislav Karaulić
- 1988: Branislav Karaulić
- 1989: Rok Kopitar
- 1990: Miro Kocuvan
- 1991: Matjaž Petan
- 1992: Zoran Budiša
- 1993: Zoran Budiša
- 1994: Siniša Peša
- 1995: Siniša Peša
- 1996: Siniša Peša
- 1997: Siniša Peša
- 1998: Siniša Peša
- 1999: Siniša Peša
- 2000: Siniša Peša
- 2001: Slavoljub Nikolić
- 2002: Igor Segedinski

=== High jump ===
- 1960: Boris Kavcic
- 1961: Djordje Majtan
- 1962: Djordje Majtan
- 1963: Dragan Andjelković
- 1964: Djordje Majtan
- 1965: Miodrag Todosijević
- 1966: Branko Vivod
- 1967: Leopold Milek
- 1968: Leopold Milek
- 1969: Miodrag Todosijević
- 1970: Branko Vivod
- 1971: Miodrag Todosijević
- 1972: Branko Vivod
- 1973: Danial Temim
- 1974: Danial Temim
- 1975: Danial Temim
- 1976: Danial Temim
- 1977: Danial Temim
- 1978: Danial Temim
- 1979: Danial Temim
- 1980: Danial Temim
- 1981: Danial Temim
- 1982: Novića Canović
- 1983: Novića Canović
- 1984: Novića Canović
- 1985: Sašo Apostolovski
- 1986: Novića Canović
- 1987: Novića Canović
- 1988: Miha Prijon
- 1989: Sašo Apostolovski
- 1990: Stevan Zorić
- 1991: Momir Stefanović
- 1992: Stevan Zorić
- 1993: Dragutin Topić
- 1994: Stevan Zorić
- 1995: Stevan Zorić
- 1996: Dragutin Topić
- 1997: Djordje Niketić
- 1998: Djordje Niketić
- 1999: Dragutin Topić
- 2000: Dragutin Topić
- 2001: Djordje Niketić
- 2002: Djordje Niketić

=== Pole vault ===
- 1921: Lucijan Kovačić
- 1922: Lucijan Kovačić
- 1923: Lucijan Kovačić
- 1924: Lucijan Kovačić
- 1960: Roman Lešek
- 1961: Roman Lešek
- 1962: Dragan Arapović
- 1963: Roman Lešek
- 1964: Roman Lešek
- 1965: Dragan Arapović
- 1966: Franc Rojko
- 1967: Dragan Arapović
- 1968: Dragan Arapović
- 1969: Stevan Tišma
- 1970: Darko Novosel
- 1971: Roman Lešek
- 1972: Roman Lešek
- 1973: Roman Lešek
- 1974: Jože Koleta
- 1975: Bořivoj Bošnjak
- 1976: Miran Bizjak
- 1977: Miran Bizjak
- 1978: Miran Bizjak
- 1979: Želimir Šarcević
- 1980: Miran Bizjak
- 1981: Miran Bizjak
- 1982: Dragan Georgijevski
- 1983: Dragan Georgijevski
- 1984: Želimir Šarcević
- 1985: Želimir Šarcević
- 1986: Želimir Šarcević
- 1987: Zoran Radovanović
- 1988: Zoran Radovanović
- 1989: Dragan Georgijevski
- 1990: Zoran Radovanović
- 1991: Aca Stanković
- 1992: Zoran Ašković
- 1993: Fedja Kamasi
- 1994: Aca Stanković
- 1995: Fedja Kamasi
- 1996: Aca Stanković
- 1997: Fedja Kamasi
- 1998: Fedja Kamasi
- 1999: Milan Stošić
- 2000: Fedja Kamasi
- 2001: Fedja Kamasi
- 2002: Fedja Kamasi & Dejan Mandarić

=== Long jump ===
- 1923: Aleksa Spahić
- 1926: Aleksa Spahić
- 1960: Ante Ledić
- 1961: Mirko Kolnik
- 1962: Branislav Munjić
- 1963: Branko Miler
- 1964: Branislav Munjić
- 1965: Branislav Munjić
- 1966: Milan Babić
- 1967: Slobodan Jovanović
- 1968: Milan Babić
- 1969: Milan Babić
- 1970: Milan Spasojević
- 1971: Miljenko Rak
- 1972: Nenad Stekić
- 1973: Nenad Stekić
- 1974: Nenad Stekić
- 1975: Nenad Stekić
- 1976: Nenad Stekić
- 1977: Nenad Stekić
- 1978: Fahrudin Jahić
- 1979: Miljenko Rak
- 1980: Nenad Erega
- 1981: Mirko Krolo
- 1982: Željko Grabušić
- 1983: Nenad Stekić
- 1984: Dušan Šukletović
- 1985: Nenad Stekić
- 1986: Lahor Marinović
- 1987: Siniša Ergotić
- 1988: Jovića Petrović
- 1989: Siniša Ergotić
- 1990: Siniša Ergotić
- 1991: Andreja Marinković
- 1992: Dragan Despotović
- 1993: Stevan Grujić
- 1994: Danijel Mišić
- 1995: Željko Obradović
- 1996: Marko Rajić
- 1997: Marko Rajić
- 1998: Predrag Milovanović
- 1999: Danial Jahić
- 2000: Danial Jahić
- 2001: Danial Jahić
- 2002: Marko Milinkov

=== Triple jump ===
- 1939: Miroslav Gal
- 1960: Zdenko Kuzmanić
- 1961: Radoslav Jocić
- 1962: Radoslav Jocić
- 1963: Vladimir Njaradi
- 1964: Radoslav Jocić
- 1965: Vladimir Njaradi
- 1966: Vladimir Njaradi
- 1967: Vladimir Njaradi
- 1968: Vladimir Njaradi
- 1969: Milan Babić
- 1970: Milan Spasojević
- 1971: Milan Spasojević
- 1972: Milan Spasojević
- 1973: Milan Spasojević
- 1974: Matija Košir
- 1975: Miloš Srejović
- 1976: Janoš Hegediš
- 1977: Janoš Hegediš
- 1978: Miloš Srejović
- 1979: Milan Spasojević
- 1980: Janoš Hegediš
- 1981: Nenad Erega
- 1982: Janoš Hegediš
- 1983: Janoš Hegediš
- 1984: Đorđe Kožul
- 1985: Đorđe Kožul
- 1986: Đorđe Kožul
- 1987: Đorđe Kožul
- 1988: Đorđe Kožul
- 1989: Zoran Đurđević
- 1990: Zoran Đurđević
- 1991: Željko Obradović
- 1992: Zoran Đurđević
- 1993: Željko Obradović
- 1994: Željko Obradović
- 1995: Branko Krsmanović
- 1996: Zoran Đurđević
- 1997: Zoran Đurđević
- 1998: Zoran Đurđević
- 1999: Zoran Đurđević
- 2000: Zoran Đurđević
- 2001: Zoran Ranković
- 2002: Zoran Ranković

=== Shot put ===
- 1920: Aleksa Spahić
- 1923: Aleksa Spahić
- 1933: Aleksa Spahić
- 1960: Milija Jocović
- 1961: Milija Jocović
- 1962: Boško Tomasović
- 1963: Petar Barišić
- 1964: Milija Jocović
- 1965: Petar Barišić
- 1966: Milija Jocović
- 1967: Tomislav Šuker
- 1968: Tomislav Šuker
- 1969: Petar Barišić
- 1970: Ivan Ivančić
- 1971: Ivan Ivančić
- 1972: Ivan Ivančić
- 1973: Ivan Ivančić
- 1974: Ivan Ivančić
- 1975: Ivan Ivančić
- 1976: Vladimir Milić
- 1977: Ivan Ivančić
- 1978: Vladimir Milić
- 1979: Vladimir Milić
- 1980: Vladimir Milić
- 1981: Zlatan Saračević
- 1982: Jovan Lazarević
- 1983: Jovan Lazarević
- 1984: Mladen Jegdic
- 1985: Vladimir Milić
- 1986: Vladimir Milić
- 1987: Jovan Lazarević
- 1988: Jovan Lazarević
- 1989: Zlatan Saračević
- 1990: Dragan Perić
- 1991: Dragan Perić
- 1992: Dragan Perić
- 1993: Dragan Perić
- 1994: Dragan Perić
- 1995: Vladimir Vicentijević
- 1996: Dragan Perić
- 1997: Dragan Perić
- 1998: Dragan Perić
- 1999: Dragan Perić
- 2000: Dragan Perić
- 2001: Dragan Perić
- 2002: Árpád Šinko

=== Discus throw ===
- 1923: Aleksa Spahić
- 1960: Dako Radošević
- 1961: Dako Radošević
- 1962: Dako Radošević
- 1963: Dako Radošević
- 1964: Dako Radošević
- 1965: Dako Radošević
- 1966: Dako Radošević
- 1967: Milija Jocović
- 1968: Marjan Gredelj
- 1969: Ivan Šebalj
- 1970: Zdravko Pečar
- 1971: Zdravko Pečar
- 1972: Marjan Gredelj
- 1973: Zdravko Pečar
- 1974: Zdravko Pečar
- 1975: Zdravko Pečar
- 1976: Vladimir Milić
- 1977: Vladimir Milić
- 1978: Vladimir Milić
- 1979: Dmitar Marčeta
- 1980: Boris Oklešcen
- 1981: Instruktor
- 1982: Dmitar Marčeta
- 1983: Instruktor
- 1984: Instruktor
- 1985: Instruktor
- 1986: Instruktor
- 1987: Dragan Mustapić
- 1988: Dragan Mustapić
- 1989: Dragan Mustapić
- 1990: Dragan Mustapić
- 1991: Dragan Mustapić
- 1992: Dragan Perić
- 1993: Dragan Perić
- 1994: Dragan Perić
- 1995: Veljko Cegar
- 1996: Veljko Cegar
- 1997: Dragan Perić
- 1998: Csaba Gulyas
- 1999: Veljko Cegar
- 2000: Csaba Gulyas
- 2001: Veljko Cegar
- 2002: Veljko Cegar

=== Hammer throw ===
- 1935: Milan Stepišnik
- 1937: Milan Stepišnik
- 1960: Zvonko Bezjak
- 1961: Krešimir Racić
- 1962: Krešimir Racić
- 1963: Zvonko Bezjak
- 1964: Krešimir Racić
- 1965: Ilija Šoškić
- 1966: Srećko Štiglić
- 1967: Srećko Štiglić
- 1968: Srećko Štiglić
- 1969: Srećko Štiglić
- 1970: Srećko Štiglić
- 1971: Srećko Štiglić
- 1972: Srećko Štiglić
- 1973: Srećko Štiglić
- 1974: Srećko Štiglić
- 1975: Srećko Štiglić
- 1976: Srećko Štiglić
- 1977: Srećko Štiglić
- 1978: Srećko Štiglić
- 1979: Srećko Štiglić
- 1980: Srećko Štiglić
- 1981: Srećko Štiglić
- 1982: Srećko Štiglić
- 1983: Srećko Štiglić
- 1984: Srećko Štiglić
- 1985: Srećko Štiglić
- 1986: Srećko Štiglić
- 1987: Šime Sucic
- 1988: Srećko Štiglić
- 1989: Nenad Pavlinić
- 1990: Dragan Majstorović
- 1991: Vladimir Kevo
- 1992: Marjan Hadžić
- 1993: Dragan Majstorović
- 1994: Dragan Majstorović
- 1995: Dragan Malbašić
- 1996: Dragan Majstorović
- 1997: Zoran Milanović
- 1998: Dragan Majstorović
- 1999: Zoran Milanović
- 2000: Nemanja Štrbac
- 2001: Zoran Lončar
- 2002: Zoran Lončar

=== Javelin throw ===
- 1960: Božidar Miletić
- 1961: Božidar Miletić
- 1962: Petar Galić
- 1963: Božidar Miletić
- 1964: Petar Galić
- 1965: Petar Galić
- 1966: Petar Galić
- 1967: Žarko Primorac
- 1968: Marjan Špilar
- 1969: Nedjo Djurović
- 1970: Nedjo Djurović
- 1971: Žarko Primorac
- 1972: Zlatko Bezjak
- 1973: Stevan Vukmirović
- 1974: Marko Boduljak
- 1975: Žarko Primorac
- 1976: Žarko Primorac
- 1977: Bora Pavlović
- 1978: Nedjo Djurović
- 1979: Miran Globevnik
- 1980: Neđo Đurović
- 1981: Darko Čujnić
- 1982: Nedjo Djurović
- 1983: Sejad Krdžalić
- 1984: Sejad Krdžalić
- 1985: Darko Čujnić
- 1986: Darko Čujnić
- 1987: Sejad Krdžalić
- 1988: Sejad Krdžalić
- 1989: Radoman Šćekić
- 1990: Radoman Šćekić
- 1991: Goran Bošnjak
- 1992: Radoman Šćekić
- 1993: Radoman Šćekić
- 1994: Jovan Đukić
- 1995: Radoman Šćekić
- 1996: Goran Bošnjak
- 1997: Goran Bošnjak
- 1998: Bojan Ilić
- 1999: Jovan Đukić
- 2000: Bojan Ilić
- 2001: Slaviša Radosavljev
- 2002: Bojan Ilić

=== Decathlon ===
- 1960: Mirko Kolnik
- 1961: Ante Ledić
- 1962: Jože Brodnik
- 1963: Jože Brodnik
- 1964: Mirko Kolnik
- 1965: Ilija Grubor
- 1966: Franc Vravnik
- 1967: Dragan Andrejević
- 1968: Franc Vravnik
- 1969: Franc Vravnik
- 1970: Franc Vravnik
- 1971: Zlatko Bezjak
- 1972: Ivan Makarović
- 1973: Ivan Makarović
- 1974: Bojan Struger
- 1975: Bojan Struger
- 1976: Dušan Prezelj
- 1977: Vilim Rimac
- 1978: Janez Penca
- 1979: Joško Vlašić
- 1980: Joško Vlašić
- 1981: Joško Vlašić
- 1982: Joško Vlašić
- 1983: Joško Vlašić
- 1984: Ivan Makarović
- 1985: Matevž Kadiš
- 1986: Saša Karan
- 1987: Saša Karan
- 1988: Saša Karan
- 1989: Saša Karan
- 1990: Saša Karan
- 1991: Matjaž Polak
- 1992: Slavoljub Nikolić
- 1993: Slavoljub Nikolić
- 1994: Slavoljub Nikolić
- 1995: Not held
- 1996: Not held
- 1997: Slavoljub Nikolić
- 1998: Fedja Kamasi
- 1999: Dejan Mandarić
- 2000: Dejan Mandarić
- 2001: Dejan Mandarić
- 2002: Not held

=== 10,000 metres walk ===
- 1989: Mico Cvjetković
- 1990: Milan Balek
- 1991: Aleksandar Raković
- 1992: Aleksandar Raković
- 1993: Aleksandar Raković
- 1994: Aleksandar Raković
- 1995: Aleksandar Raković
- 1996: Aleksandar Raković
- 1997: Aleksandar Raković
- 1998: Nenad Filipović
- 1999: Aleksandar Raković
- 2000: Predrag Filipović
- 2001: Aleksandar Raković
- 2002: Not held

=== 20 kilometres walk ===
- 1960: Erminio Juricić
- 1961: Ožbald Vister
- 1962: Ožbald Vister
- 1963: Munib Tabaković
- 1964: Ožbald Vister
- 1965: Munib Tabaković
- 1966: Rudolf Male
- 1967: Tomislav Stefanović
- 1968: Rudolf Male
- 1969: Rudolf Male
- 1970: Vince Cović
- 1971: Valerijan Pupavac
- 1972: Vince Cović
- 1973: Vinko Galušić
- 1974: Milan Orešković
- 1975: Milan Orešković
- 1976: Vinko Galušić
- 1977: Vinko Galušić
- 1978: Vinko Galušić
- 1979: Vinko Galušić
- 1980: Edvard Kolar
- 1981: Vinko Galušić
- 1982: Vinko Galušić
- 1983: Edvard Kolar
- 1984: Milan Balek
- 1985: Edvard Kolar
- 1986: Edvard Kolar
- 1987: Mico Cvjetković
- 1988: Mico Cvjetković
- 1989: Mico Cvjetković
- 1990: Milan Balek
- 1991: Aleksandar Raković
- 1992: Not held
- 1993: Not held
- 1994: Aleksandar Raković
- 1995: Not held
- 1996: Aleksandar Raković
- 1997: Aleksandar Raković
- 1998: Aleksandar Raković
- 1999: Not held
- 2000: Predrag Filipović
- 2001: Not held
- 2002: Not held

=== 50 kilometres walk ===
- 1962: Munib Tabaković
- 2002: Aleksandar Raković

=== Cross country (long) ===
- 1960: Franjo Mihalić
- 1961: Ištvan Ivanović
- 1962: Franc Hafner
- 1963: Franjo Mihalić
- 1964: Franc Červan
- 1965: Dušan Bogunović
- 1966: Dane Korica
- 1967: Franc Kovać
- 1968: Drago Žuntar
- 1969: Nedo Farčić
- 1970: Not held
- 1971: Dane Korica
- 1972: Dane Korica
- 1973: Peter Svet
- 1974: Peter Svet
- 1975: Stevan Vulović
- 1976: Stevan Vulović
- 1977: Stevan Vulović
- 1978: Stanko Lisec
- 1979: Stanko Lisec
- 1980: Darko Lazović
- 1981: Numan Ukić
- 1982: Dragan Zdravković
- 1983: Dragan Zdravković
- 1984: Stanislav Rozman
- 1985: Stanislav Rozman
- 1986: Stanislav Rozman
- 1987: Mladen Kršek
- 1988: Mladen Kršek
- 1989: Dragan Sekulić
- 1990: Romeo Živko
- 1991: Mladen Kršek
- 1992: Ljubiša Djokić
- 1993: Ljubiša Djokić
- 1994: Borisav Dević
- 1995: Goran Raičević
- 1996: Dragoslav Prpa
- 1997: Dragoslav Prpa
- 1998: Dragoslav Prpa
- 1999: Janko Benša
- 2000: Dragoslav Prpa
- 2001: Sreten Ninković
- 2002: Goran Stojiljković

=== Cross country (short) ===
- 1960: Franc Hafner
- 1961: Simo Važić
- 1962: Simo Važić
- 1963: Franc Červan
- 1964: Slavko Špan
- 1965: Simo Važić
- 1966: Franc Červan

=== Partisans walk (26 km) ===
- 1960: Franjo Mihalić
- 1961: Dobrivoje Stojanović
- 1962: Franjo Mihalić
- 1963: Ištvan Ivanović
- 1964: Franjo Mihalić
- 1965: Rok Štros
- 1966: Franc Červan
- 1967: Rok Štros
- 1968: Milivoje Pešić
- 1969: Mirko Vujaklija
- 1970: Nexhmedin Ibishi
- 1971: Milivoj Radojcević
- 1972: Slobodan Dinić
- 1973: Radovan Skocajić
- 1974: Sead Kondo
- 1975: Sead Kondo
- 1976: Sead Kondo
- 1977: Sead Kondo
- 1978: Sead Kondo
- 1979: Petar Budija
- 1980: Numan Ukić
- 1981: Numan Ukić
- 1982: Marjan Krempl
- 1983: Alija Kajan
- 1984: Alija Kajan
- 1985: Mladen Grgić
- 1986: Miroslav Vindiš
- 1987: Miroslav Vindiš
- 1988: Miroslav Vindiš
- 1989: Miroslav Vindiš
- 1990: Miroslav Vindiš

== Women ==
=== 100 metres ===
- 1960: Olga Šikovec
- 1961: Olga Šikovec-Luncer
- 1962: Zdenka Leskovać
- 1963: Olga Šikovec-Luncer
- 1964: Marijana Lubej
- 1965: Marijana Lubej
- 1966: Ljiljana Petnjarić
- 1967: Marijana Lubej
- 1968: Marijana Lubej
- 1969: Željka Anić
- 1970: Željka Anić
- 1971: Jelića Pavlicić
- 1972: Milanka Lazarević
- 1973: Jelića Pavlicić
- 1974: Jelića Pavlicić
- 1975: Jelića Pavlicić
- 1976: Jelića Pavlicić
- 1977: Dijana Sokać
- 1978: Dijana Sokać
- 1979: Dijana Sokać
- 1980: Dijana Ištvanović
- 1981: Dijana Ištvanović
- 1982: Vesna Budovalcev
- 1983: Dijana Ištvanović
- 1984: Dijana Ištvanović
- 1985: Dijana Ištvanović
- 1986: Marina Flajšman
- 1987: Kornelija Šinković
- 1988: Dijana Ištvanović
- 1989: Kornelija Šinković
- 1990: Aleksandra Rus
- 1991: Jerneja Perc
- 1992: Marina Filipović
- 1993: Marina Filipović
- 1994: Marina Živković
- 1995: Dragana Vitić
- 1996: Marina Filipović
- 1997: Marina Filipović
- 1998: Mila Savić
- 1999: Mila Savić
- 2000: Elvira Pancić
- 2001: Vukosava Djapić
- 2002: Mila Savić

=== 200 metres ===
- 1960: Olga Šikovec
- 1961: Olga Šikovec-Luncer
- 1962: Zdenka Leskovać
- 1963: Olga Šikovec-Luncer
- 1964: Marijana Lubej
- 1965: Ljiljana Petnjarić
- 1966: Ljiljana Petnjarić
- 1967: Marijana Lubej
- 1968: Marijana Lubej
- 1969: Željka Anic
- 1970: Marića Nadj-Tabori
- 1971: Marića Nadj-Tabori
- 1972: Jelića Pavlicić
- 1973: Jelića Pavlicić
- 1974: Jelića Pavlicić
- 1975: Jelića Pavlicić
- 1976: Jelića Pavlicić
- 1977: Jelića Pavlicić
- 1978: Dijana Sokać
- 1979: Dijana Sokać
- 1980: Dijana Ištvanović
- 1981: Nataša Seliškar
- 1982: Katića Mataković
- 1983: Saša Kranjc
- 1984: Nataša Seliškar
- 1985: Dušanka Suzic
- 1986: Dijana Ištvanović
- 1987: Kornelija Šinković
- 1988: Kornelija Šinković
- 1989: Marina Filipović
- 1990: Gordana Cotric
- 1991: Marina Filipović
- 1992: Marina Filipović
- 1993: Marina Filipović
- 1994: Marina Živković
- 1995: Jovana Miljković
- 1996: Marina Filipović
- 1997: Marina Filipović
- 1998: Mila Savić
- 1999: Mila Savić
- 2000: Mila Savić
- 2001: Vukosava Djapić
- 2002: Jovana Miljković

=== 400 metres ===
- 1960: Anica Slamnik
- 1961: Tea Silan
- 1962: Nada Simić
- 1963: Nada Simić
- 1964: Gizella Farkas
- 1965: Ika Maricić
- 1966: Vera Nikolić
- 1967: Ika Maricić
- 1968: Ika Maricić
- 1969: Vera Nikolić
- 1970: Snježana Glavina
- 1971: Marića Nadj-Tabori
- 1972: Djulesma Bašić
- 1973: Nadja Avdibašić
- 1974: Jelića Pavlicić
- 1975: Jelića Pavlicić
- 1976: Jelića Pavlicić
- 1977: Jelića Pavlicić
- 1978: Vesna Juras
- 1979: Jelića Štefancić
- 1980: Nataša Seliškar
- 1981: Nataša Seliškar
- 1982: Marija Kozma
- 1983: Elizabeta Božinovska
- 1984: Nataša Seliškar
- 1985: Karin Paškulin
- 1986: Slobodanka Colović
- 1987: Irena Dominc
- 1988: Slobodanka Colović
- 1989: Marjana Lužar
- 1990: Gordana Cotric
- 1991: Marina Filipović
- 1992: Marina Filipović
- 1993: Livia Abraham
- 1994: Andjelka Vukadinović
- 1995: Jelena Stanisavljević
- 1996: Biljana Mitrović
- 1997: Marina Filipović
- 1998: Jovana Miljković
- 1999: Biljana Mitrović
- 2000: Jelena Stanisavljević
- 2001: Jovana Miljković
- 2002: Tatjana Lojanica

=== 800 metres ===
- 1960: Milića Rajkov
- 1961: Milića Rajkov
- 1962: Milića Rajkov-Ninkov
- 1963: Milića Rajkov-Ninkov
- 1964: Gizella Farkas
- 1965: Ika Maricić
- 1966: Vera Nikolić
- 1967: Gizella Farkas
- 1968: Ika Maricić
- 1969: Vera Nikolić
- 1970: Vera Nikolić
- 1971: Vera Nikolić
- 1972: Vera Nikolić
- 1973: Vera Nikolić
- 1974: Danica Urankar
- 1975: Danica Urankar
- 1976: Zora Tomecić
- 1977: Vesna Juras
- 1978: Vesna Juras
- 1979: Zora Tomecić
- 1980: Nadja Avdibašić
- 1981: Zora Tomecić
- 1982: Slobodanka Colović
- 1983: Slobodanka Colović
- 1984: Slobodanka Colović
- 1985: Slobodanka Colović
- 1986: Slobodanka Colović
- 1987: Vesna Bajer
- 1988: Slobodanka Colović
- 1989: Slobodanka Colović
- 1990: Slobodanka Colović
- 1991: Snežana Pajkić
- 1992: Snežana Pajkić
- 1993: Livia Abraham
- 1994: Jelena Stanisavljević
- 1995: Jelena Sajić
- 1996: Andjelka Vukadinović
- 1997: Slavića Grgek
- 1998: Jovana Miljković
- 1999: Ivana Popadić
- 2000: Nevenka Lizdek
- 2001: Ivana Popadić
- 2002: Marina Muncan

=== 1500 metres ===
- 1969: Djurdjića Rajher
- 1970: Veselinka Milošević
- 1971: Vera Nikolić
- 1972: Djurdjića Rajher
- 1973: Vera Nikolić
- 1974: Vera Kasap
- 1975: Djurdjića Šišul-Rajher
- 1976: Breda Pergar
- 1977: Andrea Šverc
- 1978: Breda Pergar
- 1979: Zora Tomecić
- 1980: Breda Pergar
- 1981: Breda Pergar
- 1982: Breda Pergar
- 1983: Marića Mršić
- 1984: Mirela Šket
- 1985: Mirela Šket
- 1986: Snežana Pajkić
- 1987: Snežana Pajkić
- 1988: Snežana Pajkić
- 1989: Suzana Cirić
- 1990: Snežana Pajkić
- 1991: Snežana Pajkić
- 1992: Suzana Cirić
- 1993: Suzana Cirić
- 1994: Olivera Jevtić
- 1995: Almira Kuci
- 1996: Olivera Jevtić
- 1997: Marina Muncan
- 1998: Vesna Stevanović
- 1999: Snežana Kostić
- 2000: Sonja Stolić
- 2001: Tanja Radonjić
- 2002: Marina Muncan

=== 3000 metres ===
- 1972: Djurdjića Rajher
- 1973: Djurdjića Rajher
- 1974: Djurdjića Rajher
- 1975: Djurdjića Šišul-Rajher
- 1976: Breda Pergar
- 1977: Andrea Šverc
- 1978: Breda Pergar
- 1979: Ida Bunderla
- 1980: Breda Pergar
- 1981: Breda Pergar
- 1982: Breda Pergar
- 1983: Marića Mršić
- 1984: Mara Micanović
- 1985: Jasmina Focak
- 1986: Snežana Pajkić
- 1987: Snežana Pajkić
- 1988: Tijana Stojcević
- 1989: Suzana Cirić
- 1990: Snežana Pajkić
- 1991: Ljiljana Jovanović
- 1992: Suzana Cirić
- 1993: Suzana Cirić
- 1994: Nataša Zrnić
- 1995: Almira Kuci
- 1996: Not held
- 1997: Marina Muncan
- 1998: Suzana Cirić

=== 5000 metres ===
The 2000 Yugoslavian Championship in women's 5000 metres had a refereeing error which caused the race to include an additional lap (400 metres).

- 1996: Olivera Jevtić
- 1997: Suzana Cirić
- 1998: Enisa Salijević
- 1999: Ana Subotić
- 2000: Mirjana Kalajdžić
- 2001: Zorana Adžić
- 2002: Vesna Stevanović

=== 10,000 metres ===
- 1988: Suzana Cirić
- 1989: Tijana Kršek
- 1990: Suzana Cirić
- 1991: Jelena Raicević
- 1992: Nataša Zrnić
- 1993: Not held
- 1994: Ljiljana Jovanović
- 1995: Marina Muncan
- 1996: Marina Muncan
- 1997: Not held
- 1998: Not held
- 1999: Ana Subotić
- 2000: Mira Preradović
- 2001: Mira Preradović
- 2002: Not held

=== Half marathon ===
The 2000 Yugoslavian Half Marathon Championships was held over a short course, though the winner remained valid.

- 1994: Radislavka Racić
- 1995: Suzana Cirić
- 1996: Jelena Raicević
- 1997: Jelena Raicević
- 1998: Olivera Jevtić
- 1999: Olivera Jevtić
- 2000: Enisa Salijević
- 2001: Vesna Stevanović
- 2002: Olivera Jevtić

=== Marathon ===
- 1986: Marija Kušnjacić
- 1987: Ljubinka Petković
- 1988: Slavića Brcić-Marijić
- 1989: Jelena Jovićic
- 1990: Suzana Cirić
- 1991: Mirjana Hanžak
- 1992: Rada Rašković
- 1993: Suzana Cirić
- 1994: Ilona Kalmar
- 1995: Ilona Kalmar
- 1996: Suzana Cirić
- 1997: Enisa Salijević
- 1998: Zorica Rahović
- 1999: Stojanka Sokol
- 2000: Vesna Stevanović
- 2001: Vesna Stevanović
- 2002: Vesna Stevanović

=== 100K run ===
- 2001: Stojanka Sokol

=== 80 metres hurdles ===
- 1960: Draga Stamejcić
- 1961: Milka Babović
- 1962: Draga Stamejcić
- 1963: Milka Babović
- 1964: Draga Stamejcić
- 1965: Marijana Lubej
- 1966: Éva Buranyi
- 1967: Marijana Lubej
- 1968: Marijana Lubej

=== 100 metres hurdles ===
- 1969: Emina Pilav
- 1970: Emina Pilav
- 1971: Djurdja Focić
- 1972: Djurdja Focić
- 1973: Djurdja Focić
- 1974: Djurdja Focić
- 1975: Djurdja Focić
- 1976: Breda Lorenci
- 1977: Breda Lorenci
- 1978: Breda Lorenci
- 1979: Breda Lorenci
- 1980: Margita Papić
- 1981: Margita Papić
- 1982: Margita Papić
- 1983: Margita Papić
- 1984: Margita Papić
- 1985: Margita Papić
- 1986: Gordana Cotrić
- 1987: Gordana Cotrić
- 1988: Gordana Cotrić
- 1989: Brigita Bukovec
- 1990: Brigita Bukovec
- 1991: Brigita Bukovec
- 1992: Svetlana Štetić
- 1993: Svetlana Štetić
- 1994: Irena Vidojević
- 1995: Svetlana Štetić
- 1996: Svetlana Štetić
- 1997: Svetlana Lazić & Sanja Tripković
- 1998: Sanja Tripković
- 1999: Svetlana Lazić
- 2000: Mila Savić
- 2001: Olivera Stojanović
- 2002: Jelena Jotanović

=== 400 metres hurdles ===
- 1976: Zdenka Potnik
- 1977: Jelića Pavlicić
- 1978: Vera Vucić
- 1979: Zorica Puhalo
- 1980: Zorica Puhalo
- 1981: Mojca Šavle
- 1982: Snežana Gajić
- 1983: Mojca Šavle
- 1984: Mojca Pertot
- 1985: Mojca Pertot
- 1986: Irena Dominc
- 1987: Irena Dominc
- 1988: Dejana Rakita
- 1989: Irena Dominc
- 1990: Ksenija Pavlović
- 1991: Marina Filipović
- 1992: Marina Filipović
- 1993: Aleksandra Gligic
- 1994: Dušica Dejanov
- 1995: Sanja Tripković
- 1996: Dušica Dejanov
- 1997: Sanja Tripković
- 1998: Sanja Tripković
- 1999: Ivana Jovanović
- 2000: Olivera Stojanović
- 2001: Olivera Stojanović
- 2002: Milana Radić

=== High jump ===
- 1960: Olga Gere
- 1961: Olga Gere
- 1962: Olga Gere
- 1963: Olga Gere
- 1964: Olga Gere-Pulić
- 1965: Olga Gere-Pulić
- 1966: Olga Gere-Pulić
- 1967: Snežana Hrepevnik
- 1968: Snežana Hrepevnik
- 1969: Snežana Hrepevnik
- 1970: Snežana Hrepevnik
- 1971: Snežana Hrepevnik
- 1972: Snežana Hrepevnik
- 1973: Snežana Hrepevnik
- 1974: Stanka Lovše
- 1975: Snežana Hrepevnik
- 1976: Breda Lorenci
- 1977: Snežana Hrepevnik
- 1978: Snežana Hrepevnik
- 1979: Lidija Benedetić
- 1980: Lidija Benedetić
- 1981: Stanka Prezelj
- 1982: Lidija Lapajne
- 1983: Biljana Bojović
- 1984: Tamara Malešev
- 1985: Darja Lichteneger
- 1986: Biljana Petrović
- 1987: Biljana Petrović
- 1988: Amra Temim
- 1989: Biljana Petrović
- 1990: Biljana Petrović
- 1991: Gabrijela Markuš
- 1992: Szilvia Barta
- 1993: Jasna Antonijević
- 1994: Tatjana Mitrović
- 1995: Jasna Antonijević
- 1996: Jasna Antonijević
- 1997: Marijana Buljovcic
- 1998: Marijana Buljovcic
- 1999: Jelena Šcekić
- 2000: Jelena Šcekić
- 2001: Marija Plazinić
- 2002: Mirjana Lisića

=== Pole vault ===
- 1996: Dragana Golik
- 1997: Dragana Golik
- 1998: Dragana Golik
- 1999: Ljiljana Novković
- 2000: Ljiljana Novković
- 2001: Slavića Semenjuk
- 2002: Slavića Semenjuk

=== Long jump ===
- 1960: Nerimana Kušec
- 1961: Šefika Šoše
- 1962: Marijana Lubej
- 1963: Nevenka Mrinjek
- 1964: Draga Stamejcić
- 1965: Marijana Lubej
- 1966: Vera Fryk
- 1967: Vera Fryk
- 1968: Djurdja Focić
- 1969: Radojka Francoti
- 1970: Radojka Francoti
- 1971: Radojka Francoti
- 1972: Djurdja Focić
- 1973: Djurdja Focić
- 1974: Vera Krstić
- 1975: Djurdja Focić
- 1976: Zdenka Potnik
- 1977: Snežana Dancetović
- 1978: Snežana Dancetović
- 1979: Snežana Dancetović
- 1980: Milanka Lazarević
- 1981: Milanka Lazarević
- 1982: Snežana Dancetović
- 1983: Snežana Dancetović
- 1984: Snežana Dancetović
- 1985: Melita Vrkić
- 1986: Snežana Dancetović
- 1987: Snežana Dancetović
- 1988: Tamara Malešev
- 1989: Dejana Rakita
- 1990: Tamara Malešev
- 1991: Maja Radmanović
- 1992: Tamara Malešev
- 1993: Radojka Kurcubić
- 1994: Maja Radmanović
- 1995: Nataša Meši
- 1996: Marija Martinović
- 1997: Radojka Kurcubić
- 1998: Vesna Kostić
- 1999: Vukosava Djapić
- 2000: Marija Martinović
- 2001: Marija Martinović
- 2002: Vesna Kostić

=== Triple jump ===
- 1990: Tamara Malešev
- 1991: Ksenija Predikaka
- 1992: Tamara Malešev
- 1993: Dejana Rakita
- 1994: Dejana Rakita
- 1995: Ana Stanković
- 1996: Marija Martinović
- 1997: Marija Martinović
- 1998: Marija Martinović
- 1999: Marija Martinović
- 2000: Radojka Kurcubić
- 2001: Marija Martinović
- 2002: Biljana Mitrović

=== Shot put ===
- 1960: Milena Usenik
- 1961: Nevenka Bilić
- 1962: Cveta Perović
- 1963: Nevenka Bilić
- 1964: Katarina Šporer
- 1965: Katarina Šporer
- 1966: Katarina Šporer
- 1967: Cveta Perović
- 1968: Mirjana Bosnić
- 1969: Mirjana Bosnić
- 1970: Stanka Komel
- 1971: Stanka Klaić
- 1972: Nevenka Mrinjek
- 1973: Nevenka Mrinjek
- 1974: Mirjana Tufegdžić
- 1975: Mirjana Tufegdžić
- 1976: Marta Gozo
- 1977: Marta Gozo
- 1978: Mirjana Tufegdžić
- 1979: Mirjana Tufegdžić
- 1980: Mirjana Tufegdžić
- 1981: Mirjana Tufegdžić
- 1982: Mirjana Tufegdžić
- 1983: Mirjana Tufegdžić
- 1984: Mirjana Tufegdžić
- 1985: Danica Živanov
- 1986: Danica Živanov
- 1987: Danica Živanov
- 1988: Danica Živanov
- 1989: Danica Živanov
- 1990: Nataša Erjavec
- 1991: Nataša Erjavec
- 1992: Danijela Curović
- 1993: Danijela Curović
- 1994: Monika Balogh
- 1995: Svetlana Davidović
- 1996: Danijela Curović
- 1997: Nataša Meši
- 1998: Danijela Curović
- 1999: Snežana Milinković
- 2000: Snežana Milinković
- 2001: Snežana Milinković
- 2002: Snežana Milinković

=== Discus throw ===
- 1960: Milena Celesnik
- 1961: Milena Celesnik
- 1962: Milena Celesnik
- 1963: Milena Celesnik
- 1964: Milena Celesnik
- 1965: Helena Hudobivnik
- 1966: Katarina Šporer
- 1967: Kosa Nikolić
- 1968: Mirjana Bosnić
- 1969: Kosa Nikolić
- 1970: Smiljka Vuković
- 1971: Borbala Menyhart
- 1972: Kosa Stojković
- 1973: Bernarda Ronutti
- 1974: Marjeta Papler
- 1975: Kosa Stojković
- 1976: Kosa Stojković
- 1977: Kosa Stojković
- 1978: Kosa Stojković
- 1979: Kosa Stojković
- 1980: Kosa Stojković
- 1981: Snežana Golubić
- 1982: Snežana Golubić
- 1983: Snežana Golubić
- 1984: Branka Bandur
- 1985: Rozalia Nagy
- 1986: Snežana Golubić
- 1987: Snežana Golubić
- 1988: Snežana Golubić
- 1989: Snežana Golubić
- 1990: Silvija Laketa
- 1991: Silvija Laketa
- 1992: Danijela Curović
- 1993: Danijela Curović
- 1994: Tatjana Majhenic
- 1995: Danijela Curović
- 1996: Danijela Curović
- 1997: Danijela Milić
- 1998: Danijela Curović
- 1999: Snežana Milinković
- 2000: Danijela Curović
- 2001: Dragana Tomašević
- 2002: Dragana Tomašević

=== Hammer throw ===
- 1996: Zorana Mijatov
- 1997: Danijela Radaković
- 1998: Danijela Janković
- 1999: Danijela Radaković
- 2000: Danijela Janković
- 2001: Danijela Janković
- 2002: Danijela Janković

=== Javelin throw ===
- 1960: Cveta Perović
- 1961: Marijeta Kacić
- 1962: Marijeta Kacić
- 1963: Marijeta Kacić
- 1964: Marijeta Kacić
- 1965: Nataša Urbancić
- 1966: Marijeta Kacić
- 1967: Pavla Peitler
- 1968: Pavla Peitler
- 1969: Nataša Urbancić
- 1970: Ljiljana Lazić
- 1971: Nataša Urbancić
- 1972: Nataša Urbancić
- 1973: Nataša Urbancić
- 1974: Nataša Urbancić
- 1975: Borbala Menyhart
- 1976: Borbala Menyhart
- 1977: Borbala Menyhart
- 1978: Borbala Menyhart
- 1979: Borbala Menyhart
- 1980: Borbala Menyhart
- 1981: Borbala Menyhart
- 1982: Borbala Menyhart
- 1983: Gordana Bukvić
- 1984: Ankića Šumaher
- 1985: Danica Živanov
- 1986: Danica Živanov
- 1987: Kristina Jazbinšek
- 1988: Vera Cosić
- 1989: Danica Živanov
- 1990: Leonida Perc
- 1991: Romana Kuhar
- 1992: Monika Balogh
- 1993: Ivana Kojić
- 1994: Ilinka Kuljanin
- 1995: Aniko Farkas
- 1996: Aniko Farkas
- 1997: Aniko Farkas
- 1998: Maja Janjić
- 1999: Maja Janjić
- 2000: Maja Janjić
- 2001: Ivana Šcekić
- 2002: Sonja Etinski

=== Pentathlon ===
- 1960: Irena Škerjanc
- 1961: Irena Škerjanc
- 1962: Draga Stamejcić
- 1963: Draga Stamejcić
- 1964: Marijana Lubej
- 1965: Marijana Lubej
- 1966: Djurdja Focić
- 1967: Djurdja Focić
- 1968: Marijeta Pece
- 1969: Marijeta Pece
- 1970: Djurdja Focić
- 1971: Djurdja Focić
- 1972: Djurdja Focić
- 1973: Djurdja Focić
- 1974: Jadranka Antunović
- 1975: Djurdja Focić
- 1976: Breda Lorenci
- 1977: Vesna Cupurdija
- 1978: Breda Lorenci
- 1979: Mirsada Pekmezović
- 1980: Mirsada Pekmezović

=== Heptathlon ===
The heptathlon replaced the pentathlon as the standard women's combined event at the Yugoslavian Championships in 1981.

- 1981: Snežana Dancetović
- 1982: Mirsada Pekmezović
- 1983: Marina Mihajlova
- 1984: Marina Mihajlova
- 1985: Samra Tanović
- 1986: Marina Mihajlova
- 1987: Marina Mihajlova
- 1988: Marina Mihajlova
- 1989: Vladka Lopatič
- 1990: Marina Damčevska
- 1991: Marina Damčevska
- 1992: Marina Damčevska
- 1993: Dejana Rakita
- 1994: Danijela Srdanović
- 1995: Jelenka Ilić
- 1996: Not held
- 1997: Nataša Meši
- 1998: Marijana Buljovčić
- 1999: Mila Savić
- 2000: Mila Savić
- 2001: Biljana Bogunović
- 2002: Not held

=== 5000 metres walk ===
- 1994: Ivana Jovanović
- 1995: Vijoleta Branković
- 1996: Vijoleta Branković
- 1997: Anica Djokić
- 1998: Not held
- 1999: Anica Djokić
- 2000: Ankića Barzut
- 2001: Ankića Barzut
- 2002: Ankića Barzut

=== 10 kilometres walk ===
The 1991 event was held as a 10,000 m track walk and the 1994 event was a 5 km road walk.

- 1991: Kada Delić
- 1992: Not held
- 1993: Not held
- 1994: Ivana Jovanović
- 1995: Not held
- 1996: Maja Vucijević
- 1997: Maja Vucijević
- 1998: Anica Djokić
- 1999: Not held
- 2000: Ankića Barzut
- 2001: Not held
- 2002: Not held

=== Cross country ===
- 1960: Anica Gašparut
- 1961: Milica Rajkov
- 1962: Milića Rajkov
- 1963: Elica Zmejkova
- 1964: Zorica Mirović
- 1965: Mirka Petrović
- 1966: Mirka Petrović
- 1967: Vera Nikolić
- 1968: Đurđica Rajher
- 1969: Eva Fecskes
- 1970: Not held
- 1971: Đurđica Rajher
- 1972: Đurđica Rajher
- 1973: Vera Nikolić
- 1974: Veselinka Milošević
- 1975: Đurđica Rajher
- 1976: Breda Pergar
- 1977: Andrea Šverc
- 1978: Andrea Šverc
- 1979: Zora Tomecić
- 1980: Breda Pergar
- 1981: Ida Bunderla
- 1982: Ljiljana Milutinović
- 1983: Marića Mršić
- 1984: Marića Mršić
- 1985: Radislavka Racić
- 1986: Tatjana Smolnikar
- 1987: Snežana Pajkić
- 1988: Silva Rožić
- 1989: Radislavka Racić
- 1990: Jasmina Focak
- 1991: Suzana Cirić
- 1992: Ljiljana Jovanović
- 1993: Suzana Cirić
- 1994: Olivera Jevtić
- 1995: Olivera Jevtić
- 1996: Olivera Jevtić
- 1997: Olivera Jevtić
- 1998: Olivera Jevtić
- 1999: Olivera Jevtić
- 2000: Olivera Jevtić
- 2001: Sonja Stolić
- 2002: Sonja Stolić

=== Partisans walk (12 km) ===
- 1980: Ida Bunderla
- 1981: Mirjana Šijacki
- 1982: Breda Pergar
- 1983: Marija Vindiš
- 1984: Zdravka Ristićević
- 1985: Zdravka Ristićević
- 1986: Nela Jovanović
- 1987: Mara Micanović
- 1988: Tijana Stojcević
- 1989: Tijana Stojcević
- 1990: Tijana Kršek
