= AK Crvena Zvezda =

Athletics club from Belgrade, Serbia

Atletski klub Crvena zvezda
- Short name: AKCZ
- Founded: 1945
- Based in: Belgrade
- Colors
- President: Dijana Vukomanović
- Secretary: Mladen Gajić
- Website: akcrvenazvezda.rs

AK Crvena zvezda is an athletics club from Belgrade, Serbia. It is part of the sports society SD Crvena Zvezda.

== Honours and achievements ==
=== Men ===
- National Championships
  - Winners (41): 1953, 1954, 1955, 1967, 1968, 1969, 1970, 1971, 1972, 1973, 1974, 1975, 1976, 1977, 1978, 1979, 1980, 1981, 1982, 1983, 1985, 1986, 1987, 1988, 1989, 1990, 1992, 1993, 1994, 1995, 2002, 2008, 2009, 2010, 2011, 2017, 2018, 2019, 2020, 2021, 2026
- Cross country running
  - Winners (19): 1948, 1953, 1954, 1959, 1960, 1971, 1972, 1973, 1977, 1979, 1980, 1985, 1986, 1992, 1993, 1994, 2006, 2020, 2022
- National Cups
  - Winners (47): 1966, 1967, 1968, 1969, 1970, 1971, 1972, 1973, 1974, 1975, 1976, 1977, 1978, 1979, 1980, 1981, 1982, 1983, 1984, 1985, 1986, 1987, 1988, 1989, 1990, 1992, 1993, 1994, 1995, 2002, 2003, 2004, 2005, 2006, 2007, 2008, 2009, 2010, 2011, 2012, 2015, 2016, 2019, 2023, 2024, 2025, 2026
- European Champion Clubs Cup
  - Winners (1): 1989
  - Runners-up (1): 1981
  - Third place (1): 1976

=== Women ===
- National Championships
  - Winners (27): 1986, 1987, 1988, 1989, 1992, 1993, 1994, 1995, 2002, 2007, 2008, 2009, 2010, 2011, 2012, 2013, 2014, 2015, 2017, 2018, 2019, 2020, 2021, 2023, 2024, 2025, 2026
- Cross country running
  - Winners (6): 1982, 1993, 2002, 2017, 2018, 2019
- National Cups
  - Winners (24): 1986, 1987, 1988, 1989, 1992, 1993, 1994, 2002, 2003, 2004, 2005, 2006, 2008, 2009, 2010, 2011, 2013, 2014, 2015, 2016, 2019, 2023, 2024, 2026
- European Champion Clubs Cup
  - Runners-up (1): 1989
  - Third place (1): 1988

== Notable athletes ==
- (Ethiopia) Fikre Wondafrash
- (Socialist Federal Republic of Yugoslavia) Slobodan Branković
- (Socialist Federal Republic of Yugoslavia) Branko Dangubić
- (Socialist Federal Republic of Yugoslavia) Borislav Dević
- (Socialist Federal Republic of Yugoslavia) Zoran Đurđević
- (Socialist Federal Republic of Yugoslavia) Janoš Hegediš
- (Socialist Federal Republic of Yugoslavia) Velimir Ilić
- (Socialist Federal Republic of Yugoslavia) Ivan Ivančić
- (Socialist Federal Republic of Yugoslavia) Dejan Jovković
- (Socialist Federal Republic of Yugoslavia) Cmiljka Kalušević
- (Socialist Federal Republic of Yugoslavia) Branislav Karaulić
- (Socialist Federal Republic of Yugoslavia) Dane Korica
- (Socialist Federal Republic of Yugoslavia) Jovan Lazarević
- (Socialist Federal Republic of Yugoslavia) Leon Lukman
- (Socialist Federal Republic of Yugoslavia) Ismail Mačev
- (Socialist Federal Republic of Yugoslavia) Andreja Marinković
- (Socialist Federal Republic of Yugoslavia) Julija Matej
- (Socialist Federal Republic of Yugoslavia) Milan Milakov
- (Socialist Federal Republic of Yugoslavia) Vladimir Milić
- (Socialist Federal Republic of Yugoslavia) Veliša Mugoša
- (Socialist Federal Republic of Yugoslavia) Dragan Mustapić
- (Socialist Federal Republic of Yugoslavia) Breda Pergar
- (Socialist Federal Republic of Yugoslavia) Milan Petaković
- (Socialist Federal Republic of Yugoslavia) Milad Petrušić
- (Socialist Federal Republic of Yugoslavia) Borisav Pisić
- (Socialist Federal Republic of Yugoslavia) Slobodan Popović
- (Socialist Federal Republic of Yugoslavia) Marija Radosavljević
- (Socialist Federal Republic of Yugoslavia) Rade Radovanović
- (Socialist Federal Republic of Yugoslavia) Milovan Savić
- (Socialist Federal Republic of Yugoslavia) Nenad Stekić
- (Socialist Federal Republic of Yugoslavia) Kornelija Šinković
- (Socialist Federal Republic of Yugoslavia) Miodrag Todosijević
- (Socialist Federal Republic of Yugoslavia) Dragutin Topić
- (Socialist Federal Republic of Yugoslavia) Petar Vukićević
- (Socialist Federal Republic of Yugoslavia) Branko Zorko
- (Poland) Marian Kolasa
- (Poland) Mirosław Żerkowski
- (Serbia and Montenegro) Nenad Lončar
- (Serbia and Montenegro) Dragan Perić
- (Serbia and Montenegro) Sonja Stolić
- (Serbia) Tatjana Jelača
- (Serbia) Strahinja Jovančević
- (Serbia) Armin Sinančević
