= Yugoslavia Cross Country Championships =

Former annual cross country running competition

- Location: Various, Yugoslavia
- Event type: Cross country
- Distance: 12 km and 4 km for men 8 km for women
- Established: 1920

The Yugoslavia Cross Country Championships (Serbo-Croatian: Prvenstvo Jugoslavije u krosu / Првенство Југославије у кросу) was an annual cross country running competition that served as Yugoslavia's national championship for the sport. The main races on the programme were a men's and a women's long course race. Short course races for men were held until 1966.

The most successful athlete at the competition was Olivera Jevtić, who took seven straight women's title from 1994 to 2000. Dragoslav Prpa was the most successful male athlete at the competition, having four titles to his name including three consecutive wins from 1996 to 1998.

== Senior race winners ==
Edition	Year	Men's winner	Time (m:s)	Women's winner	Time (m:s)
	1960	Franjo Mihalić	27:03	Anica Gašparut	7:03
	1961	Ištvan Ivanović	25:47	Milica Rajkov	7:36
	1962	Franc Hafner	27:25	Milica Rajkov	7:33
	1963	Franjo Mihalić	23:30	Elica Zmejkova	8:16
	1964	Franc Červan	31:25	Zorica Mirović	7:09
	1965	Dušan Bogunović	31:58	Mirka Petrović	7:17
	1966	Dane Korica	27:10	Mirka Petrović	6:29
	1967	Franc Kovac	25:50	Vera Nikolić	7:07
	1968	Drago Žuntar	25:40	Djurdjica Rajher	6:37
	1969	Nedo Farčić	30:03	Eva Fecskes	
	1970	Not held			
	1971	Dane Korica	29:03	Djurdjica Rajher	6:36
	1972	Dane Korica	32:14	Djurdjica Rajher	9:00
	1973	Peter Svet	31:43	Vera Nikolić	6:41
	1974	Peter Svet	33:44	Veselinka Milošević	7:30
	1975	Stevan Vulović	36:24	Djurdjica Šišul-Rajher	9:41
	1976	Stevan Vulović	39:00	Breda Pergar	10:25
	1977	Stevan Vulović	39:01	Andrea Šverc	10:13
	1978	Stanko Lisec	34:13	Andrea Šverc	9:55
	1979	Stanko Lisec	37:46	Zora Tomecić	9:38
	1980	Darko Lazović	36:06	Breda Pergar	9:43
	1981	Numan Ukić	34:10	Ida Bunderla	9:24
	1982	Dragan Zdravković	40:37	Ljiljana Milutinović	10:03
	1983	Dragan Zdravković	37:48	Marica Mršić	10:38
	1984	Stanislav Rozman	40:33	Marica Mršić	
	1985	Stanislav Rozman	38:21	Radislavka Racić	10:59
	1986	Stanislav Rozman	37:42	Tatjana Smolnikar	9:54
	1987	Mladen Kršek	37:26	Snežana Pajkić	10:22
	1988	Mladen Kršek	35:09	Silva Rožić	13:12
	1989	Dragan Sekulić	36:20	Radislavka Racić	13:47
	1990	Romeo Živko	39:45	Jasmina Focak	14:48
	1991	Mladen Kršek	35:46	Suzana Ćirić	12:37
	1992	Ljubiša Djokić	46:07	Ljiljana Jovanović	18:01
	1993	Ljubiša Djokić	39:52	Suzana Ćirić	14:41
	1994	Borisav Dević	38:32	Olivera Jevtić	14:30
	1995	Goran Raičević	23:50	Olivera Jevtić	9:43
	1996	Dragoslav Prpa	35:56	Olivera Jevtić	15:37
	1997	Dragoslav Prpa	32:08	Olivera Jevtić	13:54
	1998	Dragoslav Prpa	30:46	Olivera Jevtić	13:38
	1999	Janko Benša	30:28	Olivera Jevtić	13:22
	2000	Dragoslav Prpa	30:48	Olivera Jevtić	13:37
	2001	Sreten Ninković	29:30	Sonja Stolić	13:04
	2002	Goran Stojiljković	31:07	Sonja Stolić	13:45

=== Short race ===
Year	Men's winner	Time (m:s)
1960	Franc Hafner	12:20
1961	Simo Važić	12:23
1962	Simo Važić	12:00
1963	Franc Červan	11:22
1964	Slavko Špan	11:53
1965	Simo Važić	12:04
1966	Franc Červan	10:30
