= List of Serbian records in athletics =

The following are the national records in athletics in Serbia maintained by its national athletics federation: Srpski Atletski Savez (SAS).

== Outdoor ==
Key to tables: Awaiting ratification Record not kept by SAS Not ratified or later rescinded by the SAS

dh = downhill

=== Men ===
Event	Record	Athlete	Date	Meet	Place	Ref.
100 m	10.34	Mladen Nikolić	7 September 1984	Balkan Games	Athens, Greece	
100 m	10.34	Marko Janković	13 June 2003	SCG Cup	Kragujevac, Serbia and Montenegro	
100 m	10.33 (±0.0 m/s) (Note: officially ratified but rolling start and start delay of 0.08)	Slobodan Branković	24 July 1993	Yugoslav Championships	Belgrade, FR Yugoslavia	
200 m	20.70 (+0.7 m/s)	Boško Kijanović	26 June 2022	Serbian Championships	Kruševac, Serbia	
300 m	33.07	Boško Kijanović	9 August 2025	Mityng Ambasadorów Białostockiego Sportu	Białystok, Poland	
400 m	45.30	Slobodan Branković	29 August 1990	European Championships	Split, Yugoslavia	
800 m	1:44.75	Slobodan Popović	15 August 1988	Gugl Games	Linz, Austria	
1000 m	2:18.88	Slobodan Popović	14 July 1989	London Grand Prix	London, United Kingdom	
1500 m	3:34.20	Elzan Bibić	4 August 2023	CITIUS Meeting	Bern, Switzerland	
Mile	3:52.24	Dragan Zdravković	17 August 1983	ISTAF Berlin	West Berlin, West Germany	
2000 m	4:56.13	Elzan Bibić	8 September 2024	Hanžeković Memorial	Zagreb, Croatia	
3000 m	7:37.03	Elzan Bibić	10 September 2023	Hanžeković Memorial	Zagreb, Croatia	
5000 m	13:13.06	Elzan Bibić	9 August 2025	IFAM Oordegem	Oordegem, Belgium	
10,000 m	27:58.39	Danijel Korica	10 August 1971	European Championships	Helsinki, Finland	
10 km (road)	28:55	Mirko Petrović	28 June 2008	Vidovdan Road Race	Brčko, Bosnia and Herzegovina	
10 km (road)	28:45	Elzan Bibić	16 November 2025	November Run 10km road race	Gevgelija, North Macedonia	
15 km (road)	43:57+	Janko Benša	27 September 1998	World Half Marathon Championships	Uster, Switzerland	
One hour	19394 m	Franc Červan	19 November 1964		Celje, Yugoslavia	
20,000 m	1:02:24.4	Franjo Mihalić	25 October 1952		Belgrade, Yugoslavia	
20 km (road)	58:38+	Elzan Bibić	23 November 2025	Belgrade Half Marathon	Belgrade, Serbia	
25,000 m	1:19:35.2	Franjo Mihalić	9 June 1957		Lappeenranta, Finland	
30,000 m	1:48:50.2	Antun Toldi	29 June 1962		Zagreb, Yugoslavia	
Half marathon	1:02:11	Janko Benša	27 September 1998	World Half Marathon Championships	Uster, Switzerland	
Half marathon	1:01:47	Elzan Bibić	23 November 2025	Belgrade Half Marathon	Belgrade, Serbia	
Marathon	2:13:57	Borislav Dević	15 January 1995	Houston Marathon	Houston, United States	
Marathon	2:12:40 dh	Sreten Ninković	17 February 2002	Austin Marathon	Austin, United States	
50 km (road)	3:05:25	Kristijan Stojšić	1 September 2019	50 km World Championships	Poiana Brașov, Romania	
100 km (road)	6:57:27	Mihal Šulja	5 March 2022	Polojska ultra 100km	Slavonski Brod, Croatia	
6 hours (road)	83.55 km (Note: by official result source, 77.828 km by SAS source)	Mihal Šulja	23 April 2022	6 hour Ultramarathon MOCY	Chorzów, Poland	
12 hours (road)	151.44 km (Note: by SAS source, also 148 km by other SAS source)	Mihal Šulja	5 June 2022	Ultramarathon Palić	Palić, Serbia	
24 hours (road)	258.667 km (Note: by official result source, 261.78 km by SAS source)	Mihal Šulja	14–15 May 2022	ABM Jędraszek UltraPark	Pabianice, Poland	
110 m hurdles	13.39 (+2.0 m/s)	Milan Ristić	14 May 2016	Pure Athletics Elite Invitational	Clermont, United States	
110 m hurdles	13.37 (+0.1 m/s) h (Note: not considered for ratification by the Executive Council as only fully automatic timing is recognized for this discipline)	Milan Ristić	6 June 2016	Galà dei Castelli	Bellinzona, Switzerland	
400 m hurdles	48.05	Emir Bekrić	15 August 2013	World Championships	Moscow, Russia	
3000 m steeplechase	8:28.80	Vule Maksimović	4 September 1989	Honvéd Meeting	Budapest, Hungary	
High jump	2.38 m	Dragutin Topić	1 August 1993	National Team Championships	Belgrade, FR Yugoslavia	
Pole vault	5.30 m	Miloš Savić	23 June 2019	Bob Vigars Classic	London, Canada	
Long jump	8.45 m (+2.0 m/s)	Nenad Stekić	25 July 1975	Pre-Olympic International Meeting	Montreal, Canada	
Triple jump	17.01 m	Miloš Srejović	20 September 1981	Balkan Games	Sarajevo, Yugoslavia	
Shot put	21.88 m	Armin Sinančević	1 May 2021	International Meeting Bar	Bar, Montenegro	
Shot put	21.88 m	Armin Sinančević	28 May 2021	Doha Diamond League	Doha, Qatar	
Discus throw	61.94 m	Dragan Perić	26 May 1991	Yugoslav Cup	Belgrade, Yugoslavia	
Hammer throw	67.93 m	Jovan Stranić	23 May 2023	Robert Prelog Memorial	Ptuj, Slovenia	
Hammer throw	68.22 m (Note: not ratified as doping control was not conducted)	Stevan Veselinović	31 March 2017	Florida Relays	Gainesville, United States	
Javelin throw	83.34 m	Sejad Krdžalić	30 May 1987	Yugoslav Cup	Belgrade, Yugoslavia	
Decathlon	8275 pts	Mihail Dudaš	10–11 August 2013	World Championships	Moscow, Russia	
Decathlon	100m / Long jump / Shot put / High jump / 400m / 110m H / Discus / Pole vault / Javelin / 1500m; 10.67 (−0.5 m/s) / 7.51 m (+0.7 m/s) / 13.45 m / 1.96 m / 47.73 / 14.59 (−0.2 m/s) / 44.06 m / 4.90 m / 59.06 m / 4:26.62					
5000 m walk	20:40.99	Vladimir Savanović	27 August 2011		Athens, Greece	
10,000 m walk	40:05.19	Aleksandar Raković	16 June 1996	Yugoslav Cup	Niš, FR Yugoslavia	
20,000 m walk	1:24:52.40	Aleksandar Raković	28 June 1997	Balkan Games	Athens, Greece	
5 km walk (road)	20:37	Vladimir Savanović	30 August 2011		Athens, Greece	
20 km walk (road)	1:21:50	Predrag Filipović	22 March 2003	Yugoslav Race Walking Championships	Surčin, Serbia and Montenegro	
35 km walk (road)	undetermined record					
50 km walk (road)	3:48:01	Aleksandar Raković	2 May 1999	IAAF World Race Walking Cup	Mézidon-Canon, France	
4 × 100 m relay	39.79	Yugoslavia; Mladen Nikolić; Dragan Zarić; Aleksandar Popović; Nenad Milinkov	19 September 1981	Balkan Games	Sarajevo, Yugoslavia	
4 × 400 m relay	2:59.95	Yugoslavia; Dejan Jovković; Nenad Đurović; Ismail Mačev; Slobodan Branković	31 August 1991	World Championships	Tokyo, Japan	

=== Women ===
Event	Record	Athlete	Date	Meet	Place	Ref.
100 m	11.34 (+0.8 m/s)	Kornelija Šinković	17 June 1987	Belgrade International Meeting	Belgrade, Yugoslavia	
200 m	23.28 (−0.2 m/s)	Marina Filipović	17 June 1997	Mediterranean Games	Bari, Italy	
400 m	51.89	Tamara Salaški	9 June 2016	International Meeting "Samarsko Zname"	Stara Zagora, Bulgaria	
600 m	1:25.05	Vera Nikolić	June 1967		Belgrade, Yugoslavia	
800 m	1:59.90	Amela Terzić	20 June 2015	European Team Championships – 2nd League	Stara Zagora, Bulgaria	
1000 m	2:39.79	Amela Terzić	26 August 2012	Athletics Bridge	Dubnica nad Váhom, Slovakia	
1500 m	4:04.77	Amela Terzić	12 July 2015	European U23 Championships	Tallinn, Estonia	
Mile	4:31.52	Marina Munćan	20 April 2012	Mt. SAC Relays	Walnut, United States	
2000 m	5:55.62	Amela Terzić	17 June 2014	Golden Spike Ostrava	Ostrava, Czech Republic	
3000 m	8:53.78	Breda Pergar	26 July 1981	Universiade	Bucharest, Romania	
5000 m	15:11.25	Olivera Jevtić	22 September 2000	Olympic Games	Sydney, Australia	
10,000 m	31:29.65	Olivera Jevtić	30 September 2000	Olympic Games	Sydney, Australia	
10 km (road)	31:31	Olivera Jevtić	14 October 2001		Budapest, Hungary	
15 km (road)	49:34+	Olivera Jevtić	27 September 1998	World Half Marathon Championships	Uster, Switzerland	
20 km (road)	1:06:26+	Olivera Jevtić	27 September 1998	World Half Marathon Championships	Uster, Switzerland	
Half marathon (road)	1:09:18	Olivera Jevtić	31 March 2002		Novi Sad, FR Yugoslavia	
25 km (road)	1:27:12	Suzana Ćirić	8 May 1994	BIG 25 Berlin	Berlin, Germany	
Marathon	2:25:23	Olivera Jevtić	13 April 2003	Rotterdam Marathon	Rotterdam, Netherlands	
50 km (road)	3:38:20	Katarina Pohlod	2 June 2019		Palić, Serbia	
100 km (road)	11:29:06	Erika Poljaković Nađ	2011		Palić, Serbia	
6 hours (road)	68.77 km	Marijana Čegar Lukić	6 May 2017		Palić, Serbia	
12 hours (road)	104 km	Karolina Madaraš Puškaš	2015		Palić, Serbia	
24 hours (road)	188 km	Lidija Mikloš	2012		?, Poland	
100 m hurdles	12.99 (+1.8 m/s)	Milica Emini	29 July 2023	Serbian Championships	Kraljevo, Serbia	
400 m hurdles	57.55	Mila Andrić	26 July 2009	European Junior Championships	Novi Sad, Serbia	
3000 m steeplechase	10:02.24	Biljana Jović	13 July 2007	European U23 Championships	Debrecen, Hungary	
High jump	1.98 m (Note: Outdoor best; indoor mark ratified as absolute record.)	Angelina Topić	19 May 2024	Meeting International Mohammed VI d'Athlétisme de Rabat	Rabat, Morocco	
High jump	1.98 m	Angelina Topić	7 July 2024	Meeting de Paris	Paris, France	
Pole vault	4.25 m	Jelena Radinović Vasić	19 August 2011	Sremska Mitrovica High Jump Meeting	Sremska Mitrovica, Serbia	
Long jump	7.14 (+1.2 m/s)	Ivana Vuleta	20 August 2023	World Championships	Budapest, Hungary	
Triple jump	14.56 m (−0.4 m/s)	Biljana Topić Mitrović	13 September 2009	World Athletics Final	Thessaloniki, Greece	
Shot put	18.86 m	Danijela Čurović	19 July 1998	Yugoslav Championships	Subotica, FR Yugoslavia	
Discus throw	63.63 m	Dragana Tomašević	8 August 2006	European Championships	Gothenburg, Sweden	
Hammer throw	66.40 m	Sara Savatović	17 April 2015		Lawrence, United States	
Hammer throw	66.41 m	Sara Savatović	15 May 2015	Big 12 Championships	Ames, United States	
Javelin throw	67.22 m	Adriana Vilagoš	26 April 2025 (Note: by World Athletics source; 26 April 2024 by SAS source, a typo)	Uskrsni miting	Split, Croatia	
Heptathlon	5618 pts	Marina Mihajlova	30 June – 1 July 1990	Yugoslav Championships	Ljubljana, Yugoslavia	
Heptathlon	100m H / High jump / Shot put / 200m / Long jump / Javelin / 800m; 14.38 / 1.74 m / 11.09 m / 26.10 / 5.80 m w / 42.00 m / 2:14.04					
3000 m walk	undetermined record					
3000 m walk	14:38.22 (Note: not ratified as doping control was not conducted)	Danica Gogov	8 July 2018	Serbian Championships	Kruševac, Serbia	
5000 m walk	22:08.36	Mina Stanković	27 July 2024		Kraljevo, Serbia	
10,000 m walk	48:20.28	Ankica Barzut	19 July 2001	European Junior Championships	Grosseto, Italy	
20,000 m walk	undetermined record					
5 km walk (road)	23:12 (Note: originally rejected as doping control was not conducted, it was ratified by SAS two years later listing the wrong year (2016) and without any mention of previous rejection. World Athletics lists it as National Best Performance (NBP))	Dušica Topić	9 June 2018	International Race Walking Festival SIMNAS	Simnas, Lithuania	
10 km walk (road)	48:07	Ankica Barzut	19 May 2001	European Race Walking Cup	Dudince, Slovakia	
15 km walk (road)	1:14:56+	Dušica Topić	7 May 2016	World Race Walking Team Championships	Rome, Italia	
20 km walk (road)	1:39:14	Dušica Topić	21 May 2017	European Race Walking Cup	Poděbrady, Czech Republic	
35 km walk (road)	undetermined record					
50 km walk (road)	4:30:43	Dušica Topić	7 August 2018	European Championships	Berlin, Germany	
4 × 100 m relay	44.65	Serbia; Anja Lukić; Ivana Ilić; Tamara Milutinović; Milana Tirnanić	22 July 2023	Balkan Championships	Kraljevo, Serbia	
4 × 400 m relay	3:34.64	Serbia; Zorana Barjaktarović; Tamara Salaški; Bojana Kaličanin; Maja Ćirić	21 July 2018	Balkan Championships	Stara Zagora, Bulgaria	

=== Mixed ===
Event	Record	Athlete	Date	Meet	Place	Ref.
4 × 400 m relay	3:21.27	Serbia; Nikola Kostić; Aleksandra Pešić; Ivan Marković; Maja Ćirić	22 June 2023	European Team Championships	Chorzów, Poland	

== Indoor ==
=== Men ===
Event	Record	Athlete	Date	Meet	Place	Ref.
50 m	5.79	Ivica Karasi	9 March 1968		Madrid, Spain	
60 m	6.66	Aleksa Kijanović	5 March 2022	Balkan Championships	Istanbul, Turkey	
60 m	6.66	Aleksa Kijanović	25 January 2023	Triple Match SRB–CRO–SLO	Belgrade, Serbia	
60 m	6.66	Aleksa Kijanović	2 February 2023	Czech Indoor Gala	Ostrava, Czech Republic	
60 m	6.66	Aleksa Kijanović	15 February 2023	Serbian Open	Belgrade, Serbia	
60 m	6.66	Aleksa Kijanović	18 February 2023	Serbian Championships	Belgrade, Serbia	
60 m	6.66	Aleksa Kijanović	13 February 2024	Belgrade Indoor Meeting	Belgrade, Serbia	
200 m	21.24	Slobodan Branković	22 February 1989		Turin, Italy	
400 m	46.22	Boško Kijanović	7 March 2022	Belgrade Meeting	Belgrade, Serbia	
800 m	1:46.44	Slobodan Popović	10 February 1988		Turin, Italy	
1000 m	2:24.57	Miloš Vučković	5 February 2010	New Balance Collegiate Invitational	New York City, United States	
1500 m	3:37.84	Elzan Bibić	7 March 2022	Belgrade Meeting	Belgrade, Serbia	
Mile	3:55.90	Elzan Bibić	2 February 2023	Czech Indoor Gala	Ostrava, Czech Republic	
2000 m	undetermined record					
3000 m	7:39.96	Elzan Bibić	22 February 2022	Copernicus Cup	Toruń, Poland	
5000 m	14:01.36	Dušan Makević	30 January 2016	John Thomas Terrier Invitational	Boston, United States	
55 m hurdles	7.21	Milan Ristić	1 December 2012	Appalachian Invitational	Boone, United States	
60 m hurdles	7.67 A	Milan Ristić	14 March 2014	NCAA Division I Championships	Albuquerque, United States	
High jump	2.35 m	Dragutin Topić	10 March 1996	European Championships	Stockholm, Sweden	
Pole vault	5.21 m	Đorđe Mijailović	1 March 2016	Serbian Open	Belgrade, Serbia	
Pole vault	5.22 m (Note: not listed for ratification at the relevant SAS Executive Council meeting)	Miloš Savić	1 February 2020	Mid-Major Invitational	Youngstown, United States	
Long jump	8.03 m	Strahinja Jovančević	3 March 2019	European Championships	Glasgow, United Kingdom	
Triple jump	16.64 m	Zoran Đurđević	9 February 1992		Belgrade, Yugoslavia	
Shot put	21.25 m	Armin Sinančević	24 February 2021	Serbian Open	Belgrade, Serbia	
Heptathlon	6099 pts	Mihail Dudaš	2–3 March 2013	European Championships	Gothenburg, Sweden	
Heptathlon	60m / Long jump / Shot put / High jump / 60m H / Pole vault / 1000m; 6.91 / 7.55 m / 14.12 m / 2.08 m / 8.13 / 4.60 m / 2:39.04					
3000 m walk	undetermined record					
3000 m walk	14:08.02 (Note: not ratified as doping control was not conducted)	Vladimir Savanović	4 February 2017	Serbian Championships	Belgrade, Serbia	
5000 m walk	20:06.32	Vladimir Savanović	24 February 2013	Slovak Championships	Bratislava, Slovakia	
4 × 200 m relay	1:25.18	Yugoslavia; Aleksandar Popović; Slobodan Branković; Ismail Mačev; Nenad Đurović	13 February 1991		Turin, Italy	
4 × 400 m relay	3:14.19	Serbia; Nikola Kostić; Darijo Bašić; Miloš Marković; Mihajlo Katanić	24 January 2024	Triple Match CRO-SLO-SRB	Belgrade, Serbia	

=== Women ===
Event	Record	Athlete	Date	Meet	Place	Ref.
60 m	7.31	Ivana Španović	31 January 2015	Novi Sad Meeting	Novi Sad, Serbia	
60 m	7.1 h	Vukosava Đapić	11 February 1998		Belgrade, FR Yugoslavia	
200 m	23.46	Kornelija Šinković	6 March 1988	European Championships	Budapest, Hungary	
400 m	52.33	Maja Ćirić	3 February 2022	Czech Indoor Gala	Ostrava, Czech Republic	
800 m	2:03.27	Amela Terzić	5 February 2017	Serbian Championships	Belgrade, Serbia	
1000 m	2:45.40	Marina Munćan	29 January 2005	Penn State National Invitational	University Park, United States	
1000 m	2:45.06	Marina Munćan	13 January 2012	NYC Gotham Cup	New York City, United States	
1500 m	4:08.48	Amela Terzić	17 February 2019	Athletics Cup	Istanbul, Turkey	
Mile	4:31.84	Marina Munćan	22 January 2011	New Balance Games	New York City, United States	
2000 m	5:48.00+	Marina Munćan	27 January 2007	Boston Indoor Games	Boston, United States	
3000 m	9:03.39	Amela Terzić	1 March 2016	Serbian Open	Belgrade, Serbia	
5000 m	16:25.53	Bogdana Mimić	18 February 2012	BIG EAST Championships	New York City, United States	
50 m hurdles	6.98+	Marija Bukvić	13 February 2025	Meeting Hauts-de-France Pas-de-Calais	Liévin, France	
60 m hurdles	8.06	Anja Lukić	29 January 2025	Belgrade Indoor Meeting	Belgrade, Serbia	
High jump	2.00 m	Angelina Topić	24 February 2026	Tipos Banskobystrická latka	Banská Bystrica, Slovakia	
Pole vault	4.11 m	Jelena Radinović Vasić	13 February 2011	Internationales Hallenmeeting	Linz, Austria	
Long jump	7.24 m (Note: outdoor mark ratified as absolute record)	Ivana Španović	5 March 2017	European Championships	Belgrade, Serbia	
Triple jump	14.41 m	Ivana Španović	28 January 2026	Triple Match CRO-SLO-SRB	Belgrade, Serbia	
Shot put	18.39 m	Danijela Čurović	31 January 1998		Sofia, Bulgaria	
Weight throw	20.66 m	Sara Savatović	27 February 2015	Big 12 Championships	Ames, United States	
Pentathlon	4240 pts	Ivana Španović	19 January 2013	Novi Sad Combined Events Meeting	Novi Sad, Serbia	
Pentathlon	60m H / High jump / Shot put / Long jump / 800m; 8.49 / 1.78 m / 12.40 m / 6.63 m / 2:43.68					
3000 m walk	13:11.22	Mina Stanković	17 February 2024	Serbian Championships	Belgrade, Serbia	
4 × 200 m relay	1:39.17	Partizan 1945; Katarina Sirmić; Bojana Kaličanin; Angela Ilić Rončeli; Maja Ćirić	2 February 2019	Serbian Championships	Belgrade, Serbia	
4 × 400 m relay	3:47.34	Serbia; Jelena Grujić; Zorana Grujić; Milica Jakšić; Maja Ćirić	25 February 2017 (Note: correct date was ratified, but SAS continuous to list the date of old record (4 February 2017) in their main records file as of April 2023)	Balkan Championships	Belgrade, Serbia	

== See also ==
- List of Serbian records in swimming
