= Dušan Janićijević =

Dušan Janićijević may refer to:

- Dušan Janićijević (actor) (1932–2011), Serbian actor
- Dušan Janićijević (athlete) (born 1955), Serbian former long-distance runner
