= Athletics at the 1975 Summer Universiade – Men's shot put =

The men's shot put event at the 1975 Summer Universiade was held at the Stadio Olimpico in Rome on 18 September.

== Results ==
Rank	Athlete	Nationality	Result	Notes
1st place, gold medalist(s)	Bishop Dolegiewicz	Canada	19.45	
2nd place, silver medalist(s)	Anatoliy Yarosh	Soviet Union	19.11	
3rd place, bronze medalist(s)	Valcho Stoev	Bulgaria	18.90	
4	Reijo Ståhlberg	Finland	18.32	
5	Dušan Hamar	Czechoslovakia	17.72	
6	Georges Schroeder	Belgium	17.13	
7	Dmitar Marčeta	Yugoslavia	16.55	
8	José Luiz Carabolante	Brazil	16.14	
9	Emad Ali Fayez	Egypt	15.57	
10	Aracelio Carrillo	Mexico	14.57	
11	Mohamed Al-Zinkawi	Kuwait	14.48	
12	Alfonso Rodríguez	Mexico	13.73	
13	Al-Hazani	Kuwait	10.06	
