= Milan Spasojević =

Serbian triple jumper (born 1950)

Personal information
- Born: 15 March 1950 (age 76) Niš, Yugoslavia

Sport
- Sport: Track and field
Medal record
Representing Yugoslavia
Mediterranean Games
Gold medal – first place	1971 Izmir	Triple jump
Silver medal – second place	1975 Algiers	Triple jump
Bronze medal – third place	1979 Split	Triple jump

Milan Spasojević (born 15 March 1950) is a Serbian triple jumper. He also competed in the long jump occasionally.

At the world level, Spasojević competed at the 1972 Summer Olympics without reaching the final before finishing tenth at the 1980 Summer Olympics. He finished 14th at the 1970 Summer Universiade, eighth at the 1973 Summer Universiade and sixth at the 1975 Summer Universiade.

Continentally, Spasojević finished 15th at the 1971 European Indoor Championships (long jump), fifth at the 1972 European Indoor Championships, tenth at the 1973 European Indoor Championships (and eighth in the long jump) seventh at the 1978 European Championships (won by his countryfellow Miloš Srejović, and fifth at the 1980 European Indoor Championships. He competed at the 1971 European Championships without reaching the final.

Regionally, Spasojević won three medals at the Mediterranean Games: gold in 1971, silver in 1975 and bronze in 1979. He also became Balkan champion in 1977. Spasojević became Yugoslavian champion in the long jump in 1970, and triple jump champion in 1970, 1971, 1972, 1973 and 1979. In the later years, his rivals were Miloš Srejović and Janoš Hegediš. Spasojević represented the club Radnički Kragujevac, and his personal best jump was 16.77 metres, achieved in 1974.
