= Milan Milakov =

Serbian pole vaulter

Personal information
- Nationality: Yugoslav/Serbian
- Born: 24 June 1930 (age 96) Ada, Severni Banat, Serbia
- Height: 178 cm (5 ft 10 in)
- Weight: 75 kg (165 lb)

Sport
- Sport: Athletics
- Event: pole vault
- Club: Athletics Club Red Star Belgrade
Medal record
Representing Yugoslavia
International University Games
| Gold medal – first place | 1953 Dortmund | Pole Vault |

Milan Milakov (Serbian: Милан Милаков; born 24 June 1930) is a Serbian retired pole vaulter who represented SFR Yugoslavia at the 1952 Summer Olympics, finishing in 13th place.

== Biography ==
Milakov was born in Ada and was a member of the Athletics Club Red Star Belgrade.

He finished second behind Geoff Elliott in the pole vault event at the British 1953 AAA Championships.
