= Simo Važić =

Yugoslav middle-distance runner (1934–2019)

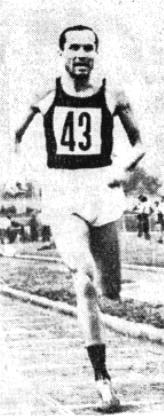
- Simo Važić in 1969.

Personal information
- Nationality: Yugoslav
- Born: 22 August 1934 Rašćani, Tomislavgrad, Yugoslavia
- Died: 25 February 2019 (aged 84)
- Height: 1.81 m (5 ft 11 in)

Sport
- Sport: Running
- Events: 1500 metres, 5000 metres
- Club: AD Kladivar, Celje

Simo Važić (22 August 1934 – 25 February 2019) was a Slovenian middle-distance and long-distance runner who represented Yugoslavia.

In the 1500 metres distance, he competed at the 1958 European Championships, the 1962 European Championships on home soil in Belgrade, the 1964 Summer Olympics and the 1966 European Championships without reaching the final. He won the 1966 Balkan Games.

He also ran the 5000 metres at the 1964 Summer Olympics and the 1966 European Championships without reaching the final.

Važić became Yugoslavian champion in the 800 metres (1964), 1500 metres (1960, 1963, 1964, 1966, 1968), 5000 metres (1965, 1967) and cross country short course (1961, 1962, 1965). He also took one indoor title in the 3000 metres.
