= Athletics at the 1981 Summer Universiade – Women's 3000 metres =

The women's 3000 metres event at the 1981 Summer Universiade was held at the Stadionul Naţional in Bucharest on 26 July 1981. It was the first time that this distance was contested at the Universiade after not being featured for two editions.

== Results ==
Rank	Athlete	Nationality	Time	Notes
1st place, gold medalist(s)	Breda Pergar	Yugoslavia	8:53.78	UR
2nd place, silver medalist(s)	Valentina Ilyinykh	Soviet Union	8:54.23	
3rd place, bronze medalist(s)	Maria Radu	Romania	8:58.58	
4	Ruth Smeeth	Great Britain	8:59.13	
5	Joan Hansen	United States	9:08.22	
6	Mercedes Calleja	Spain	9:14.71	
7	Tatiana Conac	Romania	9:23.42	
8	Fionnuala Morrish	Ireland	9:27.12	
9	Tuija Toivonen	Finland	9:44.05	
10	Susana Herrera	Mexico	10:00.46	
11	Marleen Meuris	Belgium	10:36.49	
