= Athletics at the 1977 Summer Universiade – Men's shot put =

The men's shot put event at the 1977 Summer Universiade was held at the Vasil Levski National Stadium in Sofia on 19 August.

== Results ==
Rank	Athlete	Nationality	Result	Notes
1st place, gold medalist(s)	Valcho Stoev	Bulgaria	19.55	
2nd place, silver medalist(s)	Nikolai Khristov	Bulgaria	19.44	
3rd place, bronze medalist(s)	Wolfgang Warnemünde	East Germany	18.94	
4	Bruno Pauletto	Italy	18.03	
5	Joachim Krug	West Germany	17.95	
6	Paul Buxton	Great Britain	17.89	
7	Dmitar Marčeta	Yugoslavia	17.59	
8	Garry England	United States	17.55	
9	Hercules Kollias	Greece	17.33	
10	Bruno Zecchi	Italy	17.04	
11	Philippe Heinrich	France	16.49	
12	Hishom Al-Momen	Kuwait	10.63	
13	H. Nkuria	Kenya	10.49	
