= Franc Hafner =

Yugoslav athlete

Personal information
- Nationality: Yugoslav; Slovenian
- Born: 9 February 1936 (age 90) Ljubljana, Yugoslavia
- Height: 1.88 m (6 ft 2 in)

Sport
- Sport: Middle-distance running
- Event: Steeplechase
- Club: ŽAK Ljubljana

Franc Hafner (born 9 February 1936) is a Slovenian long-distance runner. He represented Yugoslavia during his active career and specialized in the 3000 metres steeplechase.

He won the bronze medal at the 1959 Mediterranean Games. He also competed at the 1960 Summer Olympics. and the 1962 European Championships without reaching the final. He also became Yugoslavian champion several times, both in track and cross-country running.

His personal best time was 8:45.6 minutes, achieved in 1961.
