= Tamara Malešev =

Serbian athletics competitor

Personal information
- Born: January 8, 1967 (age 59) Novi Sad, Yugoslavia

Sport
- Sport: Track and field
Medal record
Representing Yugoslavia
Mediterranean Games
Gold medal – first place	1991 Athens	Long jump
European Junior Championships
Silver medal – second place	1983 Schwechat	High jump

Tamara Malešev (Serbian: Тамара Малешев; born January 8, 1967) is a retired Serbian track and field athlete who competed in the long jump and high jump. She competed at the 1992 Summer Olympics in Barcelona as an Independent Olympic Participant.

She holds the Serbian indoor record in high jump.
