= Slobodan Branković (sprinter) =

Serbian athlete and sports administrator (born 1967)

Personal information
- Born: 1 October 1967 (age 58) Obrenovac, Yugoslavia

Sport
- Sport: Track and field
Medal record
Representing Yugoslavia
Summer Universiade
Silver medal – second place	1987 Zagreb	4 x 400 m relay
European Indoor Championships
Gold medal – first place	1992 Genoa	400 m
Mediterranean Games
Silver medal – second place	1991 Athens	4 × 400 m relay

Slobodan Branković (Serbian: Слободан Бранковић; born 1 October 1967) is a Serbian former track and field athlete who specialised in the 400 metres. He is currently the general secretary of the Athletics Federation of Serbia.

He competed internationally for the Socialist Federal Republic of Yugoslavia and then the Federal Republic of Yugoslavia. He represented the former nation at the 1988 Summer Olympics, but (like a handful of other Yugoslavian athletes) competed as an individual under the Olympic flag at the 1992 Summer Olympics.

Branković was the gold medallist over 400 metres at the 1992 European Athletics Indoor Championships, a feat which gained him the "Golden Badge" as the Спорт newspaper's Yugoslav sportsperson of the year. He participated in the IAAF World Championships in Athletics on three occasions (1987, 1991, 1993). He set Yugoslavian records in the 4 × 400 metres relay and remains the holder of a variety of indoor and outdoor Serbian national records in distances from 100 metres to 400 m.

== Career ==
Born in Obrenovac in Belgrade and affiliated with the city's athletic club, AK Partizan, he made his first appearance on the world stage representing the Socialist Federal Republic of Yugoslavia. Forming part of the 4 × 400 metres relay team at the 1987 World Championships in Athletics, he ran a national Yugoslavian record time of 3:03.30 minutes with Branislav Karaulić, Slobodan Popović and Ismail Mačev. At the age of twenty, he ran in the 400 metres heats at the 1988 Seoul Olympics and improved the national relay record to 3:01.59 minutes in the semi-finals of the relay event.

At the start of 1989 Branković ran an indoor personal best over 200 metres of 21.24 seconds in Turin – this mark remains the Serbian national record. He narrowly missed out on a medal in the 400 m at the 1989 IAAF World Indoor Championships, coming in fourth place behind Spaniard Cayetano Cornet. That same year he completed a Yugoslavian title double over 200 m and 400 m. He retained his 200 m title the following year and competed for his nation on home turf for the 1990 European Athletics Championships in Split. He ran a career best of 45.30 seconds for the 400 m to qualify for the final (a time which is the current Serbian record) and finished sixth overall. As part of the relay team he helped the Yugoslavian men reach fifth place. Another Yugoslavian relay record came for him at the 1991 World Championships in Athletics: competing in a team which also featured Dejan Jovković, Nenad Đurović and Mačev, he reached the final of the competition with the country's first sub-three-minute mark for the event (2:59.95 min). The Yugoslavian team came fourth in the relay final, just over two tenths of a second behind bronze medallists Jamaica.

Branković won the 100 metres at the Yugoslavian championships, but it was over the longer sprint distance that he excelled that year. He won the 400 m gold medal at the 1992 European Athletics Indoor Championships – an achievement which proved to be the pinnacle of his individual running career. Owing to the dissolution of Yugoslavia, he was one of nine athletes to compete independent of a nation at the 1992 Summer Olympics. He reached the quarter-finals of the 400 m at the Games of Barcelona. Branković was a representative of Europe at the 1992 IAAF World Cup and came fifth overall in the 400 m. For his achievements that year, the sports daily Спорт nominated him for their "Golden Badge", recognising him as their Yugoslav sportsman of the year.

He completed a 100/200 m double at the national championships in 1993 with personal best times of 10.33 seconds and 20.98 seconds, respectively (his 100 m time was the fastest ever run at the championships at that point). Later that year, he took part in the 1993 World Championships in Athletics and ran in the heats of the 200 m. His final international performance came in the heats of the 400 m at the 1997 IAAF World Indoor Championships.

Following his retirement from athletic competition, he moved into the field of athletics administration and rose to the position of general secretary at the Athletics Federation of Serbia. He led the organising committee for the 2017 European Athletics Indoor Championships held in Belgrade.

== See also ==
- Serbian records in athletics

Awards
Preceded by Dejan Savićević	The Best Athlete of Yugoslavia; 1992	Succeeded by Igor Miladinović
