= Maja Ćirić =

Serbian sprinter

Personal information
- Nationality: Serbian
- Born: 7 November 1989 (age 35)

Sport
- Sport: Athletics
- Event: Sprinting

Maja Ćirić (born 7 November 1989) is a Serbian athlete. She competed in the women's 400 metres at the 2018 IAAF World Indoor Championships.
