= Roman Lešek =

Slovenian pole vaulter (born 1937)

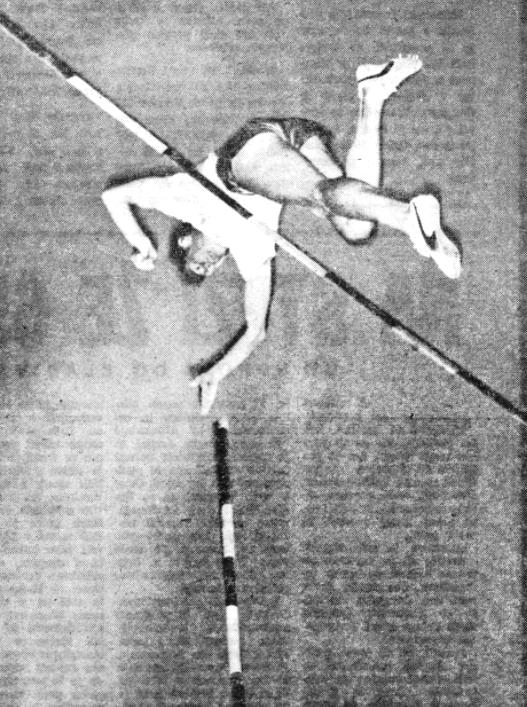
Roman Lešek (1937-), Slovene athlete

Roman Lešek (born 7 August 1937 in Celje) is a Slovenian former pole vaulter who competed in the 1960 Summer Olympics and in the 1964 Summer Olympics.
