= Vinko Galušić =

Yugoslav racewalker

Personal information
- Nationality: Yugoslav
- Born: 16 July 1954 (age 71) Tuzla, Yugoslavia

Sport
- Sport: Athletics
- Event: Racewalking
- Club: Sloboda Tuzla

Vinko Galušić (born 16 July 1954) is a Yugoslav racewalker. He competed in the men's 20 kilometres walk at the 1976 Summer Olympics. He took part in the documentary film "San o Krugovima".
