= Sreten Ninković =

Serbian long-distance runner

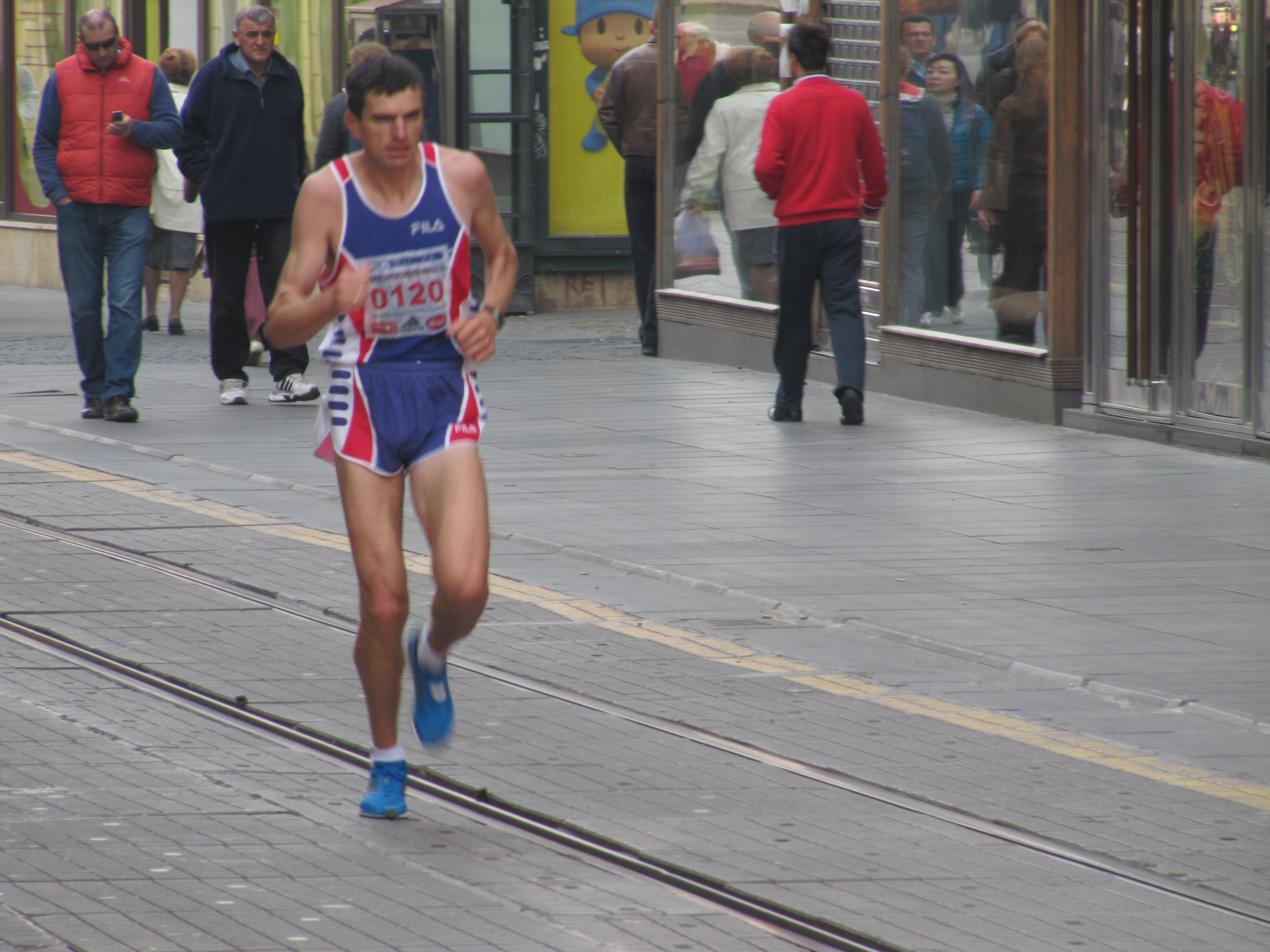
- Ninković in Zagreb (2010)

Personal information
- Nationality: Serbian
- Born: 7 December 1972 (age 53) Ub, SR Serbia, Yugoslavia

Sport
- Sport: Long-distance running
- Event: Marathon

Achievements and titles
- Personal best(s): 5000m: 14:15.29 ½ marathon: 1:04:43; Marathon: 2:12:39^{1} 3000 metres:8:20 10000 metres:29:50.00

Sreten Ninković (Serbian Cyrillic: Сретен Нинковић; born 7 December 1972) is a Serbian former long-distance runner who most often competed in the marathon. He was coached by Lazar Ćirović, Slavoljub Kuzmanović and Zvonko Lozančić. Over the course of his athletic career, Ninković represented FR Yugoslavia, Serbia and Montenegro, and Serbia.

== Running career ==
In the 1990s, Ninković developed his aerobic ability on the track, often running the 5000 metres for AK Crvena Zvezda. He then began specializing in the marathon. Ninković recorded his first major victory when he won the 2000 Novosadski Marathon. He ran his fastest marathon at the Austin Marathon with a time of 2:12:39.60 hours on February 17, 2002. He represented FR Yugoslavia in the men's marathon at the 2002 European Athletics Championships, although he did not finish the race. In 2009, he won the Skopje Marathon, recording a time of 2:29:07.

== See also ==
- Serbian records in athletics

== Notes ==
- ^1 On a downhill course with an overall drop of 137 meters. (Per WMM, 17 February 2002, Austin)
