= Ante Ledić =

Croatian politician and long jumper (born 1939)

Ante Ledić (born 12 October 1939 in Aržano, in Yugoslavia) is a Croatian businessman, politician from and vice-president of Croatian Christian Democratic Party.

In his youth, Ledić was a Yugoslav champion and national record holder in long jump and decathlon. His decathlon personal best, set in 1961, makes him the all-time top ten Croatian decathlete as of 2020.

He has never been a member of a political party, but he was very close to Franjo Tuđman and the Croatian Democratic Union. His first entry to politics happened during the Zagreb Crisis when he was proposed by Tuđman as a compromise candidate for Zagreb mayor.

In 2000 he ran for Croatian president as an independent candidate, finishing 5th, with 0.85% of the vote.
