= Mila Savić =

Serbian sprinter

Personal information
- Nationality: Serbian
- Born: 24 April 1974 (age 51)

Sport
- Sport: Sprinting
- Event: 200 metres

Mila Savić (born 24 April 1974) is a Serbian sprinter. She competed in the women's 200 metres at the 2000 Summer Olympics.
