= Milena Čelesnik =

Slovenian discus thrower

Personal information
- Nationality: Slovenian
- Born: 10 September 1933
- Died: 4 May 2017 (aged 83)

Sport
- Sport: Athletics
- Event: Discus throw

Milena Čelesnik (10 September 1933 – 4 May 2017) was a Slovenian athlete. She competed in the women's discus throw at the 1960 Summer Olympics, representing Yugoslavia.
