= Darko Radomirović =

Serbian middle-distance runner

Personal information
- Nationality: Serbian^{1}
- Born: August 5, 1977 (age 48) Kosovo Polje, Yugoslavia

Sport
- Sport: Track
- Event: 1500 metres
- Club: Partizan
- Coached by: Rifat Zilkić

Achievements and titles
- Personal bests: 800m: 1:48.77; 1500m: 3:37.52

Darko Radomirović (Serbian Cyrillic: Дарко Радомировић) is a Serbian retired middle-distance track runner who specialized in the 1500 metres discipline. He represented Yugoslavia at the 2000 Summer Olympics for the men's 1500 metre race.

== Running career ==
Radomirović first began training athletics in Novi Pazar, where he excelled in middle-distance running before he would eventually train and compete with AK Partizan.

Radomirović ran his first major international competition at the 1998 European Athletics Championships, where he ran the men's 1500 metres in the first heat, running a time of 3:46.86 (min:sec).

At the 2000 Summer Olympics, he ran the first heat of the men's 1500 metres against world-class competition and ran a time of 3:43.57. He was just four seconds shy of qualifying for the next round.

After the Olympics, Radomirović would continue to compete in international competition for another two years before dropping off the radar of international athletics for a period between 2002 and 2005. Radomirović ran the men's 1500 metres at the 2001 IAAF World Indoor Championships in a time of 3:46.36. In 2002, Radomirović ran the men's 1500 metres at the 2002 European Athletics Indoor Championships in a time of 3:54.40.

In July 2005, Radomirović made a return to international competition, running the men's 1500 metres at the 2005 Mediterranean Games in a time of 3:48.08. Just a month later, he ran the men's 1500 metres at the 2005 Summer Universiade in a time of 3:48.41.

== Notes ==
- ^1 Although Radomirović is of Serbian nationality, his presence in international athletic competition dates before the 2006 independence referendum of Montenegro, so the country he represented in athletics is cited as Federal Republic of Yugoslavia up through 2002, and after that as Serbia and Montenegro through 2005.
