= Kornelija Šinković Pavićević =

Serbian sprinter

Personal information
- Born: June 24, 1964 (age 62) Subotica, Yugoslavia

Sport
- Sport: Track and field
Medal record
Representing Yugoslavia
Mediterranean Games
Silver medal – second place	1987 Latakia	100m
Silver medal – second place	1987 Latakia	200m

Kornelija Šinković Pavićević (Serbian: Корнелија Шинковић Павићевић, born June 24, 1964) is a retired Serbian sprinter who represented SFR Yugoslavia.

She started athletics as a 14-year-old girl in her hometown Subotica, as a member of Spartak athletics club. Later she moved to compete for AK Crvena Zvezda. She still holds national record in 100m with a time 11.34. Kornelija currently works as a coach in AK Mladenovac, where she lives.

== See also ==
- Serbian records in athletics
