= Tomislav Ašković =

Yugoslav runner

Personal information
- Nationality: Yugoslav
- Born: May 4, 1951 (age 75) Novi Sad, PR Serbia, FPR Yugoslavia

Sport
- Sport: Track, long-distance running
- Event(s): 5000 metres, 10,000 metres, marathon
- Club: Vojvodina
- Coached by: Radovan Silaški

Achievements and titles
- Personal best(s): 5000m: 13:47.80; 10,000m: 29:26.45; Marathon: 2:15:27

Tomislav Ašković (born May 4, 1951) is a former distance runner who competed for Yugoslavia at the 1986 European Athletics Championships and the 1987 Mediterranean Games in the marathon.

== Running career ==
In 1979, Ašković won the "Liberation of Ludbreg Race" in Ludbreg, finishing ahead of runner-up Marjan Krempl who would later become a successful marathoner. On July 8, 1980, he ran his personal best in the 5000 meters in 13:47.80, finishing in sixth place at the Rosicky Memorial track meet at Stadion Evžena Rošického.

Ašković ran the 1986 New York City Marathon, where he finished in 25th place in a time of 2:18:27. He finished in 14th place in the men's marathon at the 1986 European Athletics Championships in a time of 2:15:27. On June 7, 1987, he won the Novi Sad Marathon in 2:14:30, although the course was short according to the Association of Road Racing Statisticians. He finished in fifth place in the men's marathon at the 1987 Mediterranean Games.

== Later career ==
In 1995, Ašković and Branislav Petrović started a magazine called YU-Maraton. After nine issues, the magazine was discontinued after 1997. He started an athletics club in Žabljak, but by 2012 the club was disbanded due to lack of interest.
