= Marina Filipović =

Serbian sprinter (born 1970)

Marina Filipović (later Živković; born 22 December 1970) is a retired Serbian athlete who competed primarily in the 200 and 400 metres. She competed in the women's 200 metres at the 1996 Summer Olympics. She represented FR Yugoslavia at the 1997 World Championships and 1997 World Indoor Championships.

She still holds Serbian records in outdoor 200 and 400 metres, as well as indoor 400 metres.

== Competition record ==
| Year | Competition | Venue | Position | Event | Notes |
Representing Yugoslavia
| 1987 | European Junior Championships | Birmingham, United Kingdom | 19th (h) | 100 m | 12.34 |
| 1987 | European Junior Championships | Birmingham, United Kingdom | 18th (h) | 200 m | 25.92 |
| 1988 | World Junior Championships | Sudbury, Canada | 37th (h) | 200 m | 24.83 |
| 1988 | World Junior Championships | Sudbury, Canada | 5th | 4 × 400 m relay | 3:37.52 |
| 1990 | European Championships | Split, Yugoslavia | 21st (h) | 400 m | 57.57 |
Representing FR Yugoslavia
| 1993 | Universiade | Buffalo, United States | 13th (sf) | 200 m | 23.87 |
| 1993 | Universiade | Buffalo, United States | 9th (h) | 400 m | 55.35 |
| 1996 | Olympic Games | Atlanta, United States | 34th (h) | 200 m | 23.51 |
| 1996 | Olympic Games | Atlanta, United States | 36th (h) | 400 m | 53.10 |
| 1997 | World Indoor Championships | Paris, France | 19th (h) | 200 m | 23.84 |
| 1997 | World Indoor Championships | Paris, France | 18th (h) | 400 m | 54.18 |
| 1997 | Mediterranean Games | Bari, Italy | 5th | 200 m | 23.55 |
| 1997 | World Championships | Athens, Greece | 35th (h) | 200 m | 23.54 |
| 1997 | World Championships | Athens, Greece | 26th (h) | 400 m | 53.16 |

== Personal bests ==
Outdoor

- 100 metres – 11.76 (Belgrade 1987)
- 200 metres – 23.28 (-0.2 m/s) (Bari 1997) NR
- 400 metres – 52.88 (Athens 1997) former NR
- 400 metres hurdles – 57.57 (Split 1990) former NR

Indoor

- 200 metres – 23.84 (Paris 1997)
- 400 metres – 53.52 (Budapest 1997) former NR
