= Miro Kocuvan =

Slovenian hurdler

Personal information
- Born: 15 June 1971 (age 55) Celje, Yugoslavia
- Height: 1.82 m (6 ft 0 in)
- Weight: 69 kg (152 lb)

Sport
- Sport: Track and field
- Event: 400 metres hurdles

Miro Kocuvan (born 15 June 1971 in Celje) is a retired Slovenian athlete who specialised in the 400 metres hurdles. He represented his country at the 1996 Summer Olympics, as well as four consecutive World Championships starting in 1993.

Kocuvan's personal best in the event is 49.43 seconds set in Bari in 1997 when winning the bronze medal at the 1997 Mediterranean Games. His father, Miro Kocuvan Sr., was a sprinter.

== Competition record ==
| Year | Competition | Venue | Position | Event | Notes |
Representing Yugoslavia
| 1989 | European Junior Championships | Varaždin, Yugoslavia | 8th | 400 m hurdles | 52.80 |
| 1989 | European Junior Championships | Varaždin, Yugoslavia | 7th | 4 × 400 m relay | 3:13.79 |
| 1990 | World Junior Championships | Plovdiv, Bulgaria | 6th | 400 m hurdles | 50.82 |
| 1990 | World Junior Championships | Plovdiv, Bulgaria | 11th (h) | 4 × 400 m relay | 3:09.67 |
| 1990 | European Championships | Split, Yugoslavia | 21st (h) | 400 m hurdles | 51.37 |
Representing Slovenia
| 1993 | Mediterranean Games | Narbonne, France | 4th | 400 m hurdles | 50.13 |
| 1993 | World Championships | Stuttgart, Germany | 20th (sf) | 400 m hurdles | 49.71 |
| 1994 | European Championships | Helsinki, Finland | 23rd (h) | 400 m hurdles | 50.30 |
| 1995 | World Championships | Gothenburg, Sweden | 14th (h) | 400 m hurdles | 49.45 |
| 1996 | Olympic Games | Atlanta, United States | 25th (h) | 400 m hurdles | 49.66 |
| 1997 | Mediterranean Games | Bari, Italy | 3rd | 400 m hurdles | 49.43 |
| 1997 | World Championships | Athens, Greece | – | 400 m hurdles | DNF |
| 1998 | European Championships | Budapest, Hungary | 18th (h) | 400 m hurdles | 50.54 |
| 1998 | European Championships | Budapest, Hungary | 10th (h) | 4 × 400 m relay | 3:07.78 |
| 1999 | World Championships | Seville, Spain | 20th (h) | 400 m hurdles | 49.63 |
| 1999 | World Championships | Seville, Spain | 13th (h) | 4 × 400 m relay | 3:02.70 |
