= Srećko Štiglić =

Croatian hammer thrower (1943–2020)

Personal information
- Nationality: Croatian
- Born: 11 June 1943 Zagreb, Independent State of Croatia
- Died: 10 September 2020 (aged 77)

Sport
- Sport: Athletics
- Event: Hammer throw

Srećko Štiglić (11 June 1943 – 10 September 2020) was a Croatian hammer thrower who competed for SFR Yugoslavia in the 1972 Summer Olympics. Štiglić's personal best was 70.10 m, set in 1981.
