= Radojka Francoti =

Yugoslavian long jumper

Personal information
- Nationality: Yugoslav
- Born: 20 August 1952 (age 73) Karin Gornji, SFR Yugoslavia

Sport
- Sport: Athletics
- Event: Long jump

Radojka Francoti (born 20 August 1952) is a Yugoslav athlete. She competed in the women's long jump at the 1972 Summer Olympics and the 1976 Summer Olympics.
