= Danial Temim =

Yugoslav high jumper

Personal information
- Nationality: Yugoslav
- Born: 6 March 1955 (age 71) Mostar, FPR Yugoslavia

Sport
- Sport: Athletics
- Event: High jump
Medal record
Representing Yugoslavia
Summer Universiade
Bronze medal – third place	1975 Rome	High jump
Mediterranean Games
Bronze medal – third place	1979 Split	High jump

Danial Temim (born 6 March 1955) is a Yugoslav athlete. He competed in the men's high jump at the 1976 Summer Olympics.
