= Borislav Dević =

Serbian runner (1963–2023)

Personal information
- Nationality: Yugoslav^{1} Serbian
- Born: 9 January 1963 Donje Biljane, Ravni Kotari, SR Croatia, SFR Yugoslavia
- Died: 8 January 2023 (aged 59) Sydney, Australia

Sport
- Sport: Track, long-distance running
- Events: 1500 metres, 5000 metres, marathon
- Club: AK Crvena Zvezda

Achievements and titles
- Personal bests: 1500m: 3:40.8; 5000m: 14:01.95; 10,000m: 29:38.14; Marathon: 2:13:57

Borislav Dević (Serbian Cyrillic: Борислав Девић; 9 January 1963 – 8 January 2023) was a Serbian track athlete and marathoner who specialized in various disciplines in middle-distance and long-distance races. He represented Yugoslavia at the 1996 Summer Olympics.

== Running career ==
Dević was born in Donje Biljane, a small village in Ravni Kotari. Growing up in Kninska Krajina, he first specialized in the 1500 metres. He became one of the most competitive middle-distance track runners in all of SR Croatia and ran at the 1987 Summer Universiade in Zagreb. When Yugoslavia began to break up, he moved briefly to Sarajevo, but soon took refuge in Belgrade while his parents moved to live in the United States. Being without his parents or any close relatives in Belgrade, he was invited by Goran Raičević and his wife Jelena to live with them. He formed a very close friendship with Raičević, and their training together lasted up to the time when Dević ran the men's marathon at the 1996 Summer Olympics, finishing in 49th place of 111 finishers with a time of 2:21:22. He finished in seventh place at the 1997 Belgrade Marathon in a time of 2:16:01.

After the end of the NATO bombing of Yugoslavia, Dević moved to Australia. A Japanese movie director, who was fascinated by Dević's life story and his friendship with Raičević, planned to make a documentary about Dević's career.

He died on 8 January 2023 at the age of 59. His funeral was held on 12 January in Cabramatta Serbian Orthodox Church and was buried at Liverpool Cemetery, both the funeral and burial were attended by hundreds of people including close friends, family and young athletes he had trained throughout the years following his move to Australia.

== Notes ==
- ^1 Although Dević was of Serbian nationality, all of his results in international competition date before the Constitutional Charter of Serbia and Montenegro, so the country he represented in athletics is cited as SFR or FR Yugoslavia. Some of Dević's personal best results are maintained as Serbian results by Serbia's Athletic Association's all-time best lists.
