= Stanko Perpar =

Yugoslav sprinter

Personal information
- Nationality: Yugoslav
- Born: 25 January 1899
- Died: 5 April 1966 (aged 67)

Sport
- Sport: Sprinting
- Event: 200 metres

Stanko Perpar (25 January 1899 – 5 April 1966) was a Yugoslav sprinter. He competed in the men's 200 metres at the 1924 Summer Olympics.
