= Jelena Stanisavljević =

Serbian sprinter (born 1978)

Personal information
- Nationality: Serbian
- Born: 25 August 1978 (age 48)

Sport
- Sport: Sprinting
- Event: 4 × 400 metres relay

Jelena Stanisavljević (born 25 August 1978) is a Serbian sprinter. She competed in the women's 4 × 400 metres relay at the 2000 Summer Olympics, representing Serbia and Montenegro.
