= Aca Stanković =

Serbian pole vaulter

Aca Stanković (Serbian Cyrillic: Аца Станковић; born 17 August 1967 in Belgrade) is a Serbian track and field athlete who competed in the pole vault.

Starting very late with sports, Stanković managed to be Yugoslavian junior runner-up in the pole vault and decathlon. He was well known as the last pole vault champion of former Yugoslavia, in 1991 in Sarajevo (now capital of Bosnia and Herzegovina). Croatian competitors didn't show, demonstrating protest against the war that started on their territory.

== Competition record ==
Stanković was a three-time Yugoslav champion:

1. 1991 Sarajevo-Bosnia and Hercegovina (4.60 m)
2. 1994 Belgrade Shortend Yugoslavia (4.70 m)
3. 1996 Belgrade (4.70 m)

== Personal bests ==
Best results:

- Pole vault (4.80 m)
- High jump (2.05 m)
- Long jump (6.88 m)
- 110 m hurdles (15.1 s)

Latest results:

- High jump M40 (180 cm)- Balkan Champion
  - 18. Master Athletics Balkan championship (4-5.10.2008 Bar - Montenegro)
- High jump M40 (181 cm) - 4. place in world.
  - Master Athletics World Championship (03.08.2009 Lahti - Finland)
- High jump M40 First place (178 cm)
  - XXI.Balkan master athletics championship results Domžale, Slovenija, 2. - 4. September 2011
- High Jump M45 Third place (175 cm)
  - 10th European Masters Athletics Championships Indoor (2015), Torun, Poland, March 2015
- Pole Vault M45 Fourth place (400 cm)
  - 11th European Masters Athletics Championships Indoor (2016). Ancona, Italy, March 2016
- High Jump M45 First place (171 cm)
  - Balkan master athletics championship (2016), Novi Sad, Serbia, September 2015
- Pole Vault M45 First place (390 cm)
  - Balkan master athletics championship (2016). Novi Sad, Serbia, September 2016
