= Aleksandar Popović (sprinter) =

Yugoslav sprinter

Personal information
- Nationality: Yugoslav
- Born: May 13, 1957 (age 69) Belgrade, Yugoslavia

Sport
- Sport: Track
- Event: 200 meters

Achievements and titles
- Personal best: 200 meters: 20.94
Medal record
Representing Yugoslavia
Mediterranean Games
Bronze medal – third place	1979 Split	4x100m relay

Aleksandar Popović (Serbian Cyrillic: Александар Поповић; born May 13, 1957) is a retired sprinter who represented Yugoslavia at the 1980 Summer Olympics in the men's 200 meters. He ran in the quarterfinals. Popović was a member of Partizan athletics club.
