= Petar Vukićević =

Serbian former hurdler (born 1956)

Personal information
- Born: August 7, 1956 (age 69) Belgrade, Yugoslavia

Sport
- Sport: Track and field

Petar Vukićević (born August 7, 1956) is a Serbian former hurdler who competed for Yugoslavia in the 1980 Summer Olympics in 110m hurdles finishing 8th in semi final heat.

His children Christina and Vladimir compete for Norway.
