= Dmitar Marčeta =

Serbian former track and field athlete

Personal information
- Born: 26 February 1952 (age 74) Belgrade, Yugoslavia

Sport
- Sport: Track and field

Dmitar Marčeta (born 26 February 1952) is a Serbian former track and field athlete who competed in the disciplines discus throw and shot put. He is also known for his coaching achievements, including having coached Dragan Perić, during his Silver Medal throw at the 1994 European Athletics Indoor Championships in Paris and Bronze Medal throw at the 1995 IAAF World Indoor Championships in Barcelona.

In his own career he placed seventh in the shot put at the 1977 Universiade.
