= Dane Korica =

Serbian long-distance runner

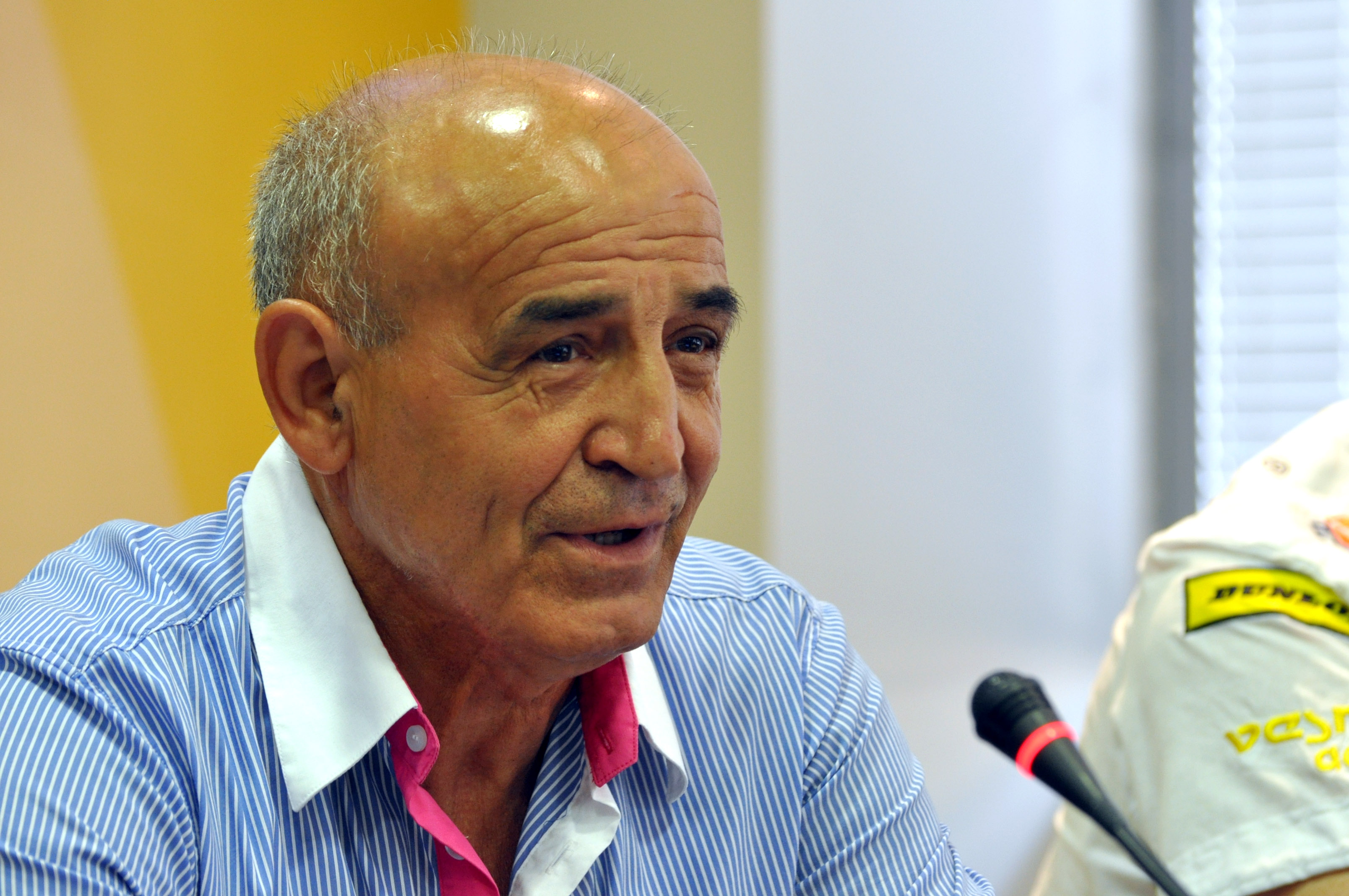
- Korica speaking in 2011

Personal information
- Nationality: Yugoslav^{1}
- Born: June 10, 1945 (age 81) Kutina, Yugoslavia (present-day Croatia)

Sport
- Sport: Track
- Events: 5000 metres, 10,000 metres
- Club: AK Crvena Zvezda

Achievements and titles
- Personal bests: 5000m: 13:31.2; 10,000m: 27:58.39
Medal record
Representing Yugoslavia
Universiade
Gold medal – first place	1973 Moscow	10,000 m

Danijel Korica (Serbian Cyrillic: Данијел Корица, born 10 June 1945), better known by his nickname Dane in his home country, is a Serbian retired long-distance runner who competed for Yugoslavia in the 1972 Summer Olympics. He is regarded as one of the greatest ever distance-runners from the areas of former Yugoslavia.

== Early life ==
Korica was born in Kutina to a family of six children. At the age of thirteen he suffered a serious leg injury from a freak accident for which he was immediately sent to the hospital. After his condition deteriorated, there was a possibility that he would have to spend the rest of his life in a wheel chair. After being sent to another emergency care center near Opatija, he began to recover. Korica was recommended by his doctors not to pursue a career in athletics. His idol growing up was Franjo Mihalić.

Korica's village had no track on which he could practice, so Korica often ran in the forest, many times barefoot. At the time, long-distance running was not a well-known occupation in Yugoslavia, and the villagers often looked at Korica as though he was crazy. One neighbor, assuming that Korica spent more time running than helping his parents, allegedly threatened if he ran on his property "with those nails on his shoes" (a reference to track spikes), that he would attack Korica with a hoe.

== Running career ==
Korica began training formally with AK Moslavina. He would go on to have a brilliant distance-running career in Europe before making it to the 1972 Summer Olympics. Korica won Politika's cross-country race on five occasions. Korica ran the men's 10,000 metre race at the 1972 Summer Olympics. In the preliminary round he ran in the third heat, finishing fourth, just four seconds behind first-place finisher Miruts Yifter. In the final round of the 10,000-meter, Korica finished 7th of 15 runners, running a time of 28:15.18. At the 1973 Summer Universiade, Korica won the gold for the 10,000 metres race.

== Notes ==
- ^1 Korica, although officially of Serbian nationality, competed solely for SFR Yugoslavia (dissolved in 1991) during his career. Korica's results are contemporarily referred to as Serbian athletic results.
