= Andreja Marinković =

Serbian athlete

Personal information
- Nationality: Serbian
- Born: 23 January 1965 (age 61)

Sport
- Sport: Athletics
- Event: Long jump

Andreja Marinković (born 23 January 1965) is a Serbian athlete. He competed in the men's long jump at the 1996 Summer Olympics.
