= Miodrag Todosijević =

Serbian high jumper

Personal information
- Born: 14 September 1941 Kraljevo
- Died: 11 November 1982 (aged 41) Belgrade

Sport
- Country: Yugoslavia
- Sport: Athletics
- Event: High jump
Medal record
Mediterranean Games
| Gold medal – first place | 1967 Tunisia | High jump |
Universiade
| Gold medal – first place | 1967 Tokyo | High jump |

Miodrag Todosijević (14 September 1941 – 11 November 1982) was a Serbian high jumper who competed in the 1968 Summer Olympics.
