= Slavko Špan =

Yugoslav middle-distance runner (1938–2021)

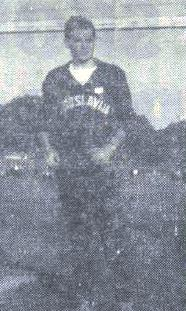

Personal information
- Nationality: Slovene
- Born: 25 May 1938 Ljubljana, Yugoslavia
- Died: 12 June 2021 (aged 83) Ljubljana, Slovenia
- Years active: 1956–1967

Sport
- Sport: Middle-distance running
- Event: Steeplechase

Slavko Špan (25 May 1938 – 12 June 2021) was a Slovene middle-distance runner.

He competed in the men's 3000 metres steeplechase at the 1964 Summer Olympics, but did not progress beyond the qualifying round. In 1962, he finished the men's 3000 metres steeplechase race in 9th place at the European Athletics Championships in Belgrade.
