= Marko Janković (sprinter) =

Serbian sprinter

Personal information
- Nationality: Serbian
- Born: 29 February 1976 (age 49)

Sport
- Sport: Sprinting
- Event: 4 × 400 metres relay

Marko Janković (born 29 February 1976) is a Serbian sprinter. He competed in the men's 4 × 400 metres relay at the 2000 Summer Olympics, representing Yugoslavia.
