= Dušan Janićijević (athlete) =

Serbian long-distance runner (born 1955)

Personal information
- Born: February 2, 1955 (age 71) Belgrade, Yugoslavia

Sport
- Sport: Track and field

Dušan Janićijević (born February 2, 1955, in Belgrade) is a Serbian former long-distance runner who represented Yugoslavia at the 1976 Summer Olympics in 10,000 metres.
