= Branislav Karaulić =

Serbian hurdler

Personal information
- Born: 8 April 1963 (age 63) Zemun, Yugoslavia

Sport
- Sport: Track and field
Medal record
Representing Yugoslavia
Summer Universiade
Silver medal – second place	1987 Zagreb	4x400m relay

Branislav Karaulić (Serbian: Бранислав Караулић; born 8 April 1963) is a retired Serbian hurdler who represented the SFR Yugoslavia at the 1988 Summer Olympics in 400m hurdles and 4 × 400 m. He was a member of the Athletics Club Red Star Belgrade.

He now lives in Georgia with his wife and four children.
