= Goran Stojiljković (runner) =

Montenegrin marathon runner (born 1979)

Personal information
- Nationality: Serbia, Montenegro
- Born: 13 November 1979 (age 46) Leskovac, Yugoslavia
- Height: 1.84 m (6 ft 1/2 in)
- Weight: 72 kg (159 lb)

Sport
- Sport: Athletics
- Event: Marathon

Achievements and titles
- Personal best: Marathon: 2:20:11 (2008) Half Marathon: 1:05:57 (2013)

Goran Stojiljković (Serbian: Горан Стојиљковић; born November 13, 1979) is a Montenegrin marathon runner. He set both a national record and a personal best time of 2:20:11 at the 2008 Rotterdam Marathon in the Netherlands.

Stojiljković represented Montenegro at the 2008 Summer Olympics in Beijing, where he competed for the men's marathon. He successfully finished the race in sixty-second place by ten seconds behind Peru's Constantino León, with a time of 2:28:14. His former coaches are Tomislav Stefanović and Aleksandar Petrović.
