= Milad Petrušić =

Yugoslav hurdler (1933–2018)

Personal information
- Nationality: Yugoslav
- Born: 20 June 1933 Rogatica, Yugoslavia
- Died: 22 October 2018 (aged 85)

Sport
- Sport: Track and field
- Event: 110 metres hurdles

Milad Petrušić (20 June 1933 – 22 October 2018) was a Yugoslav hurdler. He competed in the men's 110 metres hurdles at the 1960 Summer Olympics.
