= Milan Petaković =

Serbian sprinter

Personal information
- Nationality: Serbian
- Born: 5 January 1969 (age 57)

Sport
- Sport: Sprinting
- Event: 4 × 100 metres relay

Milan Petaković (born 5 January 1969) is a Serbian sprinter. He competed in the men's 4 × 100 metres relay at the 2000 Summer Olympics representing Yugoslavia.
