= Jovan Lazarević =

Medal record

Men's athletics

European Indoor Championships
Bronze medal – third place	1982 Milan	Shot put

Mediterranean Games
Gold medal – first place	1983 Casablanca	Shot put
Silver medal – second place	1987 Latakia	Shot put

Jovan Lazarević (Serbian: Јован Лазаревић; born 3 May 1952) is a retired shot putter who represented SFR Yugoslavia.

He won the bronze medal at the 1982 European Indoor Championships, the gold medal at the 1983 Mediterranean Games and the silver medal at the 1987 Mediterranean Games. and finished sixth at the 1984 European Indoor Championships. He became Balkan champion in 1981. He became Yugoslav shot put champion in 1982, 1983, 1987 and 1988.

His personal best throw was 20.54 metres, achieved in July 1990 in Minsk. His former coach was Nikola Tomasović.
