= Nedo Farčić =

Yugoslav long-distance runner

Personal information
- Nationality: Yugoslav
- Born: 12 October 1941 (age 84) Vela Luka, Independent State of Croatia

Sport
- Sport: Long-distance running
- Event: Marathon

Nedo Farčić (born 12 October 1941) is a Yugoslav long-distance runner. He competed in the marathon at the 1968 Summer Olympics.

== Personal bests ==
Nedo Farčić personal bests
Type	Discipline	Performance	Venue	Date	Results Score
Outdoor	5000 metres	13:45.8h	Västerås, Sweden	27 Jun 1969	1047
Outdoor	10,000 metres	28:21.0h	Helsinki, Finland	01 Jul 1971	1100
Outdoor	Marathon	2:35:57	Karaiskakis Stadium, Greece	20 Sep 1969	770
Indoor	3000 metres	8:12.2h	Belgrade Fair, Yugoslavia	9 Mar 1969	1006
