= Dragan Zdravković =

Serbian former middle-distance runner (born 1959)

Personal information
- Nationality: Yugoslav; Serbian
- Born: 16 December 1959 (age 66) Senjski Rudnik, SR Serbia, SFR Yugoslavia

Sport
- Sport: Track
- Events: 1500 meters, mile

Achievements and titles
- Personal bests: 800m: 1:48.34; 1500m: 3:34.85; Mile: 3:52.24; 3000m: 7:40.49; 5000m: 13:35.83
Medal record
Representing Yugoslavia
Men's athletics
European Indoor Championships
Gold medal – first place	1983 Budapest	3000m
Mediterranean Games
Silver medal – second place	1979 Split	1500m
Universiade
Bronze medal – third place	1985 Kobe	1500 m

Dragan Zdravković (born 16 December 1959 in Senjski Rudnik) is a Serbian former middle-distance runner. He represented Yugoslavia in international competition from the late 1970s to 1980s, and was a finalist at the 1980 Summer Olympics. Zdravković holds multiple outdoor and indoor Serbian records in athletics.

== Running career ==
Zdravković initially practiced football as a youngster in Ćuprija, until a school teacher, Aleksandar "Aca" Petrović, suggested that he begin training athletics. Zdravković's youth coaches emphasized gymnastics as a complement to his running workouts. At the age of 21 he made his Olympic debut at the 1980 Summer Olympics. In the men's 1500 meters, he progressed through the qualifying heat and semi-final rounds, but finished last in the finals. In spite of this, he was particularly happy to race with Steve Ovett:

"Yes, Steve Ovett was more sympathetic to me than Sebastian Coe. Ovett was from a working family, but Coe was a Lord. In the Olympics final in Moscow they restricted warm ups on the training field, on the track only two strides were allowed before the race. I did my first stride and turned around. Ovett ran towards me, stopped next to me and offered his hand. I didn't want to wash it for four days from how happy I was. He was different, more natural." -Zdravković

On 6 March 1983 Zdravković won the men's men's 3000 meters at the European Indoor Championships. On 15 July 1983 he won the men's 1500 meters in 3:35.28 (min:sec) at the Crystal Palace National Sports Centre in an upset over Sebastian Coe.

"I didn't have anything to lose, even if I was second it would have been a great result. Even today I joke about that race and say 'even the blind chicken gets some grain'. To be honest, if we ran three days later, he would have beat me." -Zdravković

He had qualified for the 1984 Summer Olympics, but the Athletics Federation of Yugoslavia had a sportswear contract with Adidas, and after not changing his sportswear to Adidas, Zdravković was taken off the Yugoslavian 1984 Olympic team.

== International competitions ==
Year	Competition	Venue	Position	Event	Notes
1979	Mediterranean Games	Split, Yugoslavia	2nd	1500 m	3:41.22
1980	Olympic Games	Moscow, Soviet Union	9th	1500 m	
1982	European Championships	Athens, Greece	9th	1500 m	3:42.44
1983	European Indoor Championships	Budapest, Hungary	1st	3000 m	
1983	World Championships	Helsinki, Finland	8th	1500 m	
1985	Universiade	Kobe, Japan	3rd	1500 m	3:46.78

== See also ==
- List of European Athletics Indoor Championships medalists (men)
