= Suzana Ćirić =

Serbian long-distance runner

Personal information
- Nationality: Serbian
- Born: 12 July 1969 (age 57) Inđija, Yugoslavia

Sport
- Sport: Long-distance running
- Event: Marathon
Medal record
Representing Yugoslavia
Summer Universiade
Silver medal – second place	1991 Sheffield	10,000m
Representing Independent Participant
Summer Universiade
Silver medal – second place	1993 Buffalo	10,000m

Suzana Ćirić (born 12 July 1969) is a Serbian long-distance runner. She competed in the women's marathon at the 1996 Summer Olympics. She was a multiple winner of the Belgrade Marathon (1989, 1990, 1993), and she won the 1994 editions of the Hannover Marathon (Germany) in 2:33:00 as well as the Twin Cities Marathon with a time of 2:34:04.
