= Sonja Stolić =

Sonja Stolić Соња Столић
Personal information
- Nationality: Serbian
- Born: 21 April 1980 (age 46) Kosovo Polje, SR Serbia, SFR Yugoslavia

Sport
- Sport: Athletics
- Event(s): 3000 m, 5000 m, 10000 m Cross country running

Achievements and titles
- Personal best(s): 3000 m: 8:54.52 (16 MAY 2002) 5000 m: 15:33.42 (10 AUG 2002) 10000 m: 32:00.55 (06 AUG 2002)
Medal record
Representing Serbia and Montenegro
Mediterranean Games
Silver medal – second place	2005 Almeria	1500 m
European U23 Championships
Silver medal – second place	2001 Amsterdam	10000 m
European Junior Championships
Silver medal – second place	1997 Ljubljana	3000 m
Bronze medal – third place	1999 Riga	3000 m
European Cross Country Championships
Gold medal – first place	1997 Oeiras	Junior race
Silver medal – second place	1997 Oeiras	Junior Team race
Bronze medal – third place	1998 Ferrara	Junior race

Sonja Stolić (Serbian Cyrillic: Соња Столић, born April 21, 1980, in Kosovo Polje, SFR Yugoslavia) is a Serbian middle distance and long-distance runner. She competed at the 2000 Summer Olympics in 5000m. Her coach is Desimir Gajić. Her former clubs is Mokra gora - Zubin Potok and Red Star Belgrade.
