= Franc Červan =

Yugoslav long-distance runner

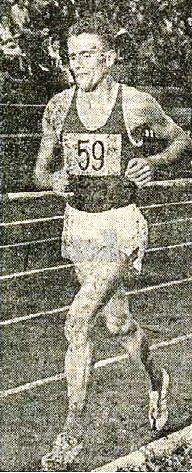

Personal information
- Nationality: Yugoslav
- Born: 14 October 1936
- Died: 7 November 1991 (aged 55)

Sport
- Sport: Long-distance running
- Event: 5000 metres

Franc Červan (14 October 1936 – 7 November 1991) was a Yugoslav long-distance runner. He competed in the men's 5000 metres and men's 10000 metres at the 1964 Summer Olympics.
