= Janoš Hegediš =

Yugoslav triple jumper

Personal information
- Nationality: Yugoslav
- Born: 28 May 1955 (age 71) Belgrade, Yugoslavia

Sport
- Sport: Athletics
- Event: Triple jump

Janoš Hegediš (born 28 May 1955) is a Yugoslav athlete. He competed in the men's triple jump at the 1976 Summer Olympics.
