= Dejan Jovković =

Yugoslav sprinter

Personal information
- Nationality: Serbian
- Born: 23 July 1968 (age 57) Zemun, SR Serbia, Yugoslavia

Sport
- Sport: Sprinting
- Event: 200 metres

Dejan Jovković (Serbian Cyrillic: Дејан Јовковић; born 23 July 1968) is a Serbian former sprinter. He competed in the men's 200 metres at the 1992 Summer Olympics as an Independent Olympic Participant.
