= Breda Pergar =

Yugoslav runner

Personal information
- Born: 22 February 1953 Maribor, Yugoslavia
- Died: 27 April 1989 (aged 36) Korenica, Yugoslavia

Sport
- Sport: Track and field
Medal record
Representing Yugoslavia
Summer Universiade
Gold medal – first place	1981 Bucharest	3000m

Breda Pergar (22 February 1953 – 27 April 1989) was a middle distance and long distance runner from Yugoslavia. A one-time Olympian (1980) she is best known for winning the gold medal at the 1981 Summer Universiade in Bucharest in the women's 3,000 metres event, clocking 8:53.78 on 26 July 1981.
