= List of Balkan Athletics Championships winners (men) =

The Balkan Athletics Championships is a regional athletics competition held between nations from the Balkans and organized by Balkan Athletics. The first games were held in Athens in 1929 as an unofficial event, receiving official sanction the following year.

The competition was not held from 1941 to 1952, although an unofficial Balkan Games was held in 1946 and a Balkan and Central European Games in 1947, involving the same countries plus Hungary. The first women's champions were declared at those events, and a women's programme continued upon the official post-World War II relaunch in 1953.

== Champions ==
=== 100 metres ===
- 1929: Renos Frangoudis (GRE)
- 1930: Angelos Lambrou (GRE)
- 1931: Angelos Lambrou (GRE)
- 1932: Renos Frangoudis (GRE)
- 1933: Renos Frangoudis (GRE)
- 1934: Julije Bauer (YUG)
- 1935: Renos Frangoudis (GRE)
- 1936: Renos Frangoudis (GRE)
- 1937: Artemon Ghitescu (ROM)
- 1938: Aleksandar Stevanović (YUG)
- 1939: Muzaffer Baloglu (TUR)
- 1940: Aleksandar Stevanović (YUG)
- 1946: Ion Moina (ROM)
- 1947: Ion Moina (ROM)
- 1953: Milovan Jovančić (YUG)
- 1954: Milovan Jovančić (YUG)
- 1955: Bruno Oslaković (YUG)
- 1956: Angel Kolev (BUL)
- 1957: Mikhail Bachvarov (BUL)
- 1958: Mikhail Bachvarov (BUL)
- 1959: Stanko Lorger (YUG)
- 1960: Mikhail Bachvarov (BUL)
- 1961: Elöd Kincses (ROM)
- 1962: Veselin Valov (BUL)
- 1963: Mikhail Bachvarov (BUL)
- 1964: Mikhail Bachvarov (BUL)
- 1965: Gheorghe Zamfirescu (ROM)
- 1966: Ivan Karasi (YUG)
- 1967: Charis Aivaliotis (GRE)
- 1968: Zhivko Traykov (BUL)
- 1969: Ivan Karasi (YUG)
- 1970: Ivan Karasi (YUG)
- 1971: Vasilis Papageorgopoulos (GRE)
- 1972: Vasilis Papageorgopoulos (GRE)
- 1973: Vasilis Papageorgopoulos (GRE)
- 1974: Vasilis Papageorgopoulos (GRE)
- 1975: Vasilis Papageorgopoulos (GRE)
- 1976: Petar Petrov (BUL)
- 1977: Petar Petrov (BUL)
- 1978: Dragan Zarić (YUG)
- 1979: Petar Petrov (BUL)
- 1980: Petar Petrov (BUL)
- 1981: Ivaylo Karanyotov (BUL)
- 1982: Kosmas Stratos (GRE)
- 1983: Kosmas Stratos (GRE)
- 1984: Mladen Nikolić (YUG)
- 1985: Valentin Atanasov (BUL)
- 1986: Valentin Atanasov (BUL)
- 1988: Anri Grigorov (BUL)
- 1989: Kremen Sokolov (BUL)
- 1990: Cengiz Kavaklıoğlu (TUR)
- 1992: Daniel Cojocaru (ROM)
- 1994: Daniel Cojocaru (ROM)
- 1996: Angelos Pavlakakis (GRE)
- 1997: Angelos Pavlakakis (GRE)
- 1998: Khristo Khristov (BUL)
- 1999: Angelos Pavlakakis (GRE)
- 2000: Angelos Pavlakakis (GRE)
- 2001: Alexandros Kontzos (GRE)
- 2002: Angelos Pavlakakis (GRE)
- 2003: Alexandros Terzian (GRE)
- 2004: Adrian Stefan (ROM)
- 2005: Yordan Ilinov (BUL)

=== 200 metres ===
- 1929: Renos Frangoudis (GRE)
- 1930: Christos Mantikas (GRE)
- 1931: Renos Frangoudis (GRE)
- 1932: Renos Frangoudis (GRE)
- 1933: Alfonz Kovačić (YUG)
- 1934: Renos Frangoudis (GRE)
- 1935: Renos Frangoudis (GRE)
- 1936: Nicolae Iordache (ROM)
- 1937: Ferdinand Kling (YUG)
- 1938: Muzaffer Baloglu (TUR)
- 1939: Melih Kotanca (TUR)
- 1940: Ion Moina (ROM)
- 1946: Ion Moina (ROM)
- 1947: Stefanos Petrakis (GRE)
- 1953: Nikolaos Georgopoulos (GRE)
- 1954: Bruno Oslaković (YUG)
- 1955: Ion Wiesenmayer (ROM)
- 1956: Mikhail Bachvarov (BUL)
- 1957: Mikhail Bachvarov (BUL)
- 1958: Nikolaos Georgopoulos (GRE)
- 1959: Mikhail Bachvarov (BUL)
- 1960: Elöd Kincses (ROM)
- 1961: Valeria Iurca (ROM)
- 1962: Zhivko Traykov (BUL)
- 1963: Gheorghe Zamfirescu (ROM)
- 1964: Gheorghe Zamfirescu (ROM)
- 1965: Gheorghe Zamfirescu (ROM)
- 1966: Gheorghe Zamfirescu (ROM)
- 1967: Trendafil Terziyski (BUL)
- 1968: Predrag Križan (YUG)
- 1969: Ivan Karasi (YUG)
- 1970: Vasilis Papageorgopoulos (GRE)
- 1971: Vasilis Papageorgopoulos (GRE)
- 1972: Miro Kocuvan (YUG)
- 1973: Petar Petrov (BUL)
- 1974: Toma Petrescu (ROM)
- 1975: Petar Petrov (BUL)
- 1976: Petar Petrov (BUL)
- 1977: Vladimir Ivanov (BUL)
- 1978: Vladimir Ivanov (BUL)
- 1979: Nikolaos Angelopoulos (GRE)
- 1980: Željko Knapić (YUG)
- 1981: Vladimir Ivanov (BUL)
- 1982: Mladen Nikolić (YUG)
- 1983: Mladen Nikolić (YUG)
- 1984: Bogomil Karadimov (BUL)
- 1985: Nikolay Markov (BUL)
- 1986: Bogomil Karadimov (BUL)
- 1988: Nikolay Antonov (BUL)
- 1989: Georgios Panagiotopoulos (GRE)
- 1990: Daniel Cojocaru (ROM)
- 1992: Evgenios Papadopoulos (GRE)
- 1994: Stelios Demotsios (GRE)
- 1996: Ioannis Nafpliotis (GRE)
- 1997: Stelios Demotsios (GRE)
- 1998: Panagiotis Sarris (GRE)
- 1999: Iliya Dzhivondov (BUL)
- 2000: Panagiotis Sarris (GRE)
- 2001: Anastasios Goussis (GRE)
- 2002: Anastasios Goussis (GRE)
- 2003: Adrian Stefan (ROM)
- 2004: Panagiotis Sarris (GRE)
- 2005: Yordan Ilinov (BUL)

=== 400 metres ===
- 1929: Vasileios Stavrinos (GRE)
- 1930: Christos Zografakis (GRE)
- 1931: Franjo Tućan (YUG)
- 1932: Francisc Nemeș (ROM)
- 1933: Francisc Nemeș (ROM)
- 1934: Karlo Nikhazy (YUG)
- 1935: Christos Mantikas (GRE)
- 1936: Christos Mantikas (GRE)
- 1937: Nicolae Iordache (ROM)
- 1938: Ferit Goren (TUR)
- 1939: Ferit Goren (TUR)
- 1940: Melih Kotanca (TUR)
- 1946: Ion Moina (ROM)
- 1947: Ion Moina (ROM)
- 1953: Vassilios Sillis (GRE)
- 1954: Vassilios Sillis (GRE)
- 1955: Vassilios Sillis (GRE)
- 1956: Ilie Savel (ROM)
- 1957: Ion Wiesenmayer (ROM)
- 1958: Viktor Šnajder (YUG)
- 1959: Viktor Šnajder (YUG)
- 1960: Miloje Grujić (YUG)
- 1961: Ðani Kovač (YUG)
- 1962: Vassilios Sillis (GRE)
- 1963: Nikolaos Regoukos (GRE)
- 1964: Ðani Kovač (YUG)
- 1965: Ðani Kovač (YUG)
- 1966: Zlatko Valchev (BUL)
- 1967: Stjepan Kremer (YUG)
- 1968: Stjepan Kremer (YUG)
- 1969: Luciano Sušanj (YUG)
- 1970: Tudor Puiu (ROM)
- 1971: Luciano Sušanj (YUG)
- 1972: Josip Alebić (YUG)
- 1973: Josip Alebić (YUG)
- 1974: Josip Alebić (YUG)
- 1975: Josip Alebić (YUG)
- 1976: Josip Alebić (YUG)
- 1977: Josip Alebić (YUG)
- 1978: Horia Toboc (ROM)
- 1979: Željko Knapić (YUG)
- 1980: Josip Alebić (YUG)
- 1981: Željko Knapić (YUG)
- 1982: Željko Knapić (YUG)
- 1983: Dinko Penev (BUL)
- 1984: Athanassios Kalogiannis (GRE)
- 1985: Željko Knapić (YUG)
- 1986: Željko Knapić (YUG)
- 1988: Ismail Mačev (YUG)
- 1989: Daniel Cojocaru (ROM)
- 1990: Nenad Đurović (YUG)
- 1992: Tsvetoslav Stankoulov (BUL)
- 1994: Mugur Mateescu (ROM)
- 1996: Stelios Demotsios (GRE)
- 1997: Ilir Xhani (ALB)
- 1998: Stelios Demotsios (GRE)
- 1999: Stelios Demotsios (GRE)
- 2000: Iliya Dzhivondov (BUL)
- 2001: Alexandru Mardan (ROM)
- 2002: Ioan Vieru (ROM)
- 2003: Ioan Vieru (ROM)
- 2004: Florin Suciu (ROM)
- 2005: Dimitrios Gravalos (GRE)

=== 800 metres ===
- 1929: Grigori Pedan (BUL)
- 1930: Grigori Pedan (BUL)
- 1931: Grigorios Georgakopoulos (GRE)
- 1932: Leon Passi (GRE)
- 1933: Grigorios Georgakopoulos (GRE)
- 1934: Grigorios Georgakopoulos (GRE)
- 1935: Grigorios Georgakopoulos (GRE)
- 1936: Grigorios Georgakopoulos (GRE)
- 1937: Emil Goršek (YUG)
- 1938: Emil Goršek (YUG)
- 1939: Stylianos Stratakos (GRE)
- 1940: Rıza Maksut İşman (TUR)
- 1946: Stjepan Đurić (YUG)
- 1947: László Marosi (HUN)
- 1953: Ekrem Koçak (TUR)
- 1954: Ekrem Koçak (TUR)
- 1955: Ekrem Koçak (TUR)
- 1956: Andrej Vipotnik (YUG)
- 1957: Evangelos Depastas (GRE)
- 1958: Joško Murat (YUG)
- 1959: Zoltan Vamoș (ROM)
- 1960: Zoltan Vamoș (ROM)
- 1961: Ekrem Koçak (TUR)
- 1962: Muharrem Dalkılıç (TUR)
- 1963: Stefan Mihaly (ROM)
- 1964: Constantin Bloțiu (ROM)
- 1965: Constantin Bloțiu (ROM)
- 1966: Jože Međimurec (YUG)
- 1967: Zlatko Valchev (BUL)
- 1968: Zlatko Valchev (BUL)
- 1969: Zlatko Valchev (BUL)
- 1970: Jože Međimurec (YUG)
- 1971: Jože Međimurec (YUG)
- 1972: Jože Međimurec (YUG)
- 1973: Luciano Sušanj (YUG)
- 1974: Luciano Sušanj (YUG)
- 1975: Luciano Sušanj (YUG)
- 1976: Luciano Sušanj (YUG)
- 1977: Milovan Savić (YUG)
- 1978: Milovan Savić (YUG)
- 1979: Dragan Životić (YUG)
- 1980: Milovan Savić (YUG)
- 1981: Binko Kolev (BUL)
- 1982: Milovan Savić (YUG)
- 1983: Milovan Savić (YUG)
- 1984: Petru Drăgoescu (ROM)
- 1985: Petru Drăgoescu (ROM)
- 1986: Slobodan Popović (YUG)
- 1988: Miroslav Chochkov (BUL)
- 1989: Miroslav Chochkov (BUL)
- 1990: Nelian Ianchis (ROM)
- 1992: Miroslav Chochkov (BUL)
- 1994: Fotis Deligiannis (GRE)
- 1996: Panagiotis Stroubakos (GRE)
- 1997: Panagiotis Stroubakos (GRE)
- 1998: Vančo Stojanov (MKD)
- 1999: Panagiotis Stroubakos (GRE)
- 2000: Vančo Stojanov (MKD)
- 2001: Stelian Tufaru (ROM)
- 2002: Vančo Stojanov (MKD)
- 2003: Ferencz Rigo (ROM)
- 2004: Selahattin Çobanoğlu (TUR)
- 2005: Catalin Mihu (ROM)

=== 1500 metres ===
- 1929: Grigori Pedan (BUL)
- 1930: Grigori Pedan (BUL)
- 1931: Grigorios Georgakopoulos (GRE)
- 1932: Grigorios Georgakopoulos (GRE)
- 1933: Christhantos Tsukalas (GRE)
- 1934: Grigorios Georgakopoulos (GRE)
- 1935: Grigorios Georgakopoulos (GRE)
- 1936: Grigorios Georgakopoulos (GRE)
- 1937: Emil Goršek (YUG)
- 1938: Emil Goršek (YUG)
- 1939: Stavros Velkopoulos (GRE)
- 1940: Zmagoslav Košir (YUG)
- 1946: Đorđe Stefanović (YUG)
- 1947: Sándor Garay (HUN)
- 1953: Cahit Önel (TUR)
- 1954: Andrija Otenhajmer (YUG)
- 1955: Veliša Mugoša (YUG)
- 1956: Veliša Mugoša (YUG)
- 1957: Evangelos Depastas (GRE)
- 1958: Joško Murat (YUG)
- 1959: Zoltan Vamoș (ROM)
- 1960: Zoltan Vamoș (ROM)
- 1961: Zoltan Vamoș (ROM)
- 1962: Zoltan Vamoș (ROM)
- 1963: Andrei Barabaș (ROM)
- 1964: Andrei Barabaș (ROM)
- 1965: Constantin Bloțiu (ROM)
- 1966: Simo Važić (YUG)
- 1967: Yoncho Kalchev (BUL)
- 1968: Atanas Atanasov (BUL)
- 1969: Atanas Atanasov (BUL)
- 1970: Jože Međimurec (YUG)
- 1971: Jože Međimurec (YUG)
- 1972: Petre Lupan (ROM)
- 1973: Miodrag Vukomanović (YUG)
- 1974: Gheorghe Ghipu (ROM)
- 1975: Gheorghe Ghipu (ROM)
- 1976: Gheorghe Ghipu (ROM)
- 1977: Gheorghe Ghipu (ROM)
- 1978: Fotis Kourtis (GRE)
- 1979: Dragan Zdravković (YUG)
- 1980: Dragan Zdravković (YUG)
- 1981: Dragan Zdravković (YUG)
- 1982: Dragan Zdravković (YUG)
- 1983: Dragan Zdravković (YUG)
- 1984: Petru Drăgoescu (ROM)
- 1985: Petru Drăgoescu (ROM)
- 1986: Petru Drăgoescu (ROM)
- 1988: Constantin Gavrila (ROM)
- 1989: Branko Zorko (YUG)
- 1990: Zeki Öztürk (TUR)
- 1992: Ion Bogde (ROM)
- 1994: Zeki Öztürk (TUR)
- 1996: Panagiotis Stroubakos (GRE)
- 1997: Ovidiu Olteanu (ROM)
- 1998: Darko Radomirović (YUG)
- 1999: Alexandru Vasile (ROM)
- 2000: Darko Radomirović (YUG)
- 2001: Panagiotis Stroubakos (GRE)
- 2002: Darko Radomirović (YUG)
- 2003: Darko Radomirović (SCG)
- 2004: Darko Radomirović (SCG)
- 2005: Darko Radomirović (SCG)

=== 3000 metres ===
- 2001: Clement Hagima (ROM)
- 2002: Not held
- 2003: Vasilios Pouliopoulos (GRE)
- 2004: Mirko Petrović (SCG)
- 2005: Mirko Petrović (SCG)

=== 5000 metres ===
- 1929: Dumitru Paveliuc (ROM)
- 1930: Athanasios Bekiaris (GRE)
- 1931: Dimitrios Nanos (GRE)
- 1932: Christhantos Tsukalas (GRE)
- 1933: Christhantos Tsukalas (GRE)
- 1934: Ivan Krevs (YUG)
- 1935: Jože Bručan (YUG)
- 1936: Cristea Dinu (ROM)
- 1937: Konstantinos Arvanitis (GRE)
- 1938: Ivan Krevs (YUG)
- 1939: Vasilios Mavrapostolos (GRE)
- 1940: Vasilios Mavrapostolos (GRE)
- 1946: Đorđe Stefanović (YUG)
- 1947: Ferenc Szegedi (HUN)
- 1953: Zdravko Ceraj (YUG)
- 1954: Drago Štritof (YUG)
- 1955: Drago Štritof (YUG)
- 1956: Veliša Mugoša (YUG)
- 1957: Veliša Mugoša (YUG)
- 1958: Christos Chiotis (GRE)
- 1959: Constantin Grecescu (ROM)
- 1960: Constantin Grecescu (ROM)
- 1961: Andrei Barabaș (ROM)
- 1962: Zoltan Vamoș (ROM)
- 1963: Muharrem Dalkılıç (TUR)
- 1964: Muharrem Dalkılıç (TUR)
- 1965: Andrei Barabaș (ROM)
- 1966: Zoltan Vamoș (ROM)
- 1967: Mikhail Markov (BUL)
- 1968: Nedo Farčić (YUG)
- 1969: Mikhail Zhelev (BUL)
- 1970: Dane Korica (YUG)
- 1971: Dane Korica (YUG)
- 1972: Dane Korica (YUG)
- 1973: Dane Korica (YUG)
- 1974: Ilie Floroiu (ROM)
- 1975: Spyridon Kontosoros (GRE)
- 1976: Ilie Floroiu (ROM)
- 1977: Paul Copu (ROM)
- 1978: Michalis Kousis (GRE)
- 1979: Ilie Floroiu (ROM)
- 1980: Aurel Niculescu (ROM)
- 1981: Dragan Zdravković (YUG)
- 1982: Dragan Zdravković (YUG)
- 1983: Dragan Zdravković (YUG)
- 1984: Evgeni Ignatov (BUL)
- 1985: Evgeni Ignatov (BUL)
- 1986: Romeo Živko (YUG)
- 1988: Dragan Sekulić (YUG)
- 1989: Zeki Öztürk (TUR)
- 1990: Zeki Öztürk (TUR)
- 1992: Zeki Öztürk (TUR)
- 1994: Zeki Öztürk (TUR)
- 1996: Dragoslav Prpa (YUG)
- 1997: Nicolae Negru (ROM)
- 1998: Dragoslav Prpa (YUG)
- 1999: Alexei Scutaru (MDA)
- 2000: Nicolae Negru (ROM)
- 2001: Dragoslav Prpa (YUG)
- 2002: Adrian Maghiar (ROM)
- 2003: Goran Stoiljković (SCG)
- 2004: Iaroslav Mușinschi (MDA)
- 2005: Marius Ionescu (ROM)

=== 10,000 metres ===
- 1929: Athanasios Bekiaris (GRE)
- 1930: Athanasios Bekiaris (GRE)
- 1931: Dumitru Paveliuc (ROM)
- 1932: Dimitrios Nanos (GRE)
- 1933: Ivan Krevs (YUG)
- 1934: Stylianos Kyriakides (GRE)
- 1935: Jože Bručan (YUG)
- 1936: Stylianos Kyriakides (GRE)
- 1937: Cristea Dinu (ROM)
- 1938: Cristea Dinu (ROM)
- 1939: Athanasios Ragazos (GRE)
- 1940: Athanasios Ragazos (GRE)
- 1946: Đorđe Stefanović (YUG)
- 1947: Jenő Szilágyi (HUN)
- 1953: Osman Coşgül (TUR)
- 1954: Franjo Mihalić (YUG)
- 1955: Osman Coşgül (TUR)
- 1956: Dimitar Vuchkov (BUL)
- 1957: Franjo Mihalić (YUG)
- 1958: Constantin Grecescu (ROM)
- 1959: Constantin Grecescu (ROM)
- 1960: Constantin Grecescu (ROM)
- 1961: Ištvan Ivanović (YUG)
- 1962: Constantin Grecescu (ROM)
- 1963: Franc Červan (YUG)
- 1964: Franc Červan (YUG)
- 1965: Nicolae Mustata (ROM)
- 1966: Franc Červan (YUG)
- 1967: Mikhail Zhelev (BUL)
- 1968: Nedo Farčić (YUG)
- 1969: Georgi Tikhov (BUL)
- 1970: Dane Korica (YUG)
- 1971: Dane Korica (YUG)
- 1972: Dane Korica (YUG)
- 1973: Dane Korica (YUG)
- 1974: Ilie Floroiu (ROM)
- 1975: Ilie Floroiu (ROM)
- 1976: Ilie Floroiu (ROM)
- 1977: Slavko Kuzmanović (YUG)
- 1978: Catalin Andreica (ROM)
- 1979: Ilie Floroiu (ROM)
- 1980: Aurel Niculescu (ROM)
- 1981: György Marko (ROM)
- 1982: Marios Kassianidis (GRE)
- 1983: Filippos Filippou (GRE)
- 1984: Evgeni Ignatov (BUL)
- 1985: György Marko (ROM)
- 1986: Necdet Ayaz (TUR)
- 1988: Manolis Chantzos (GRE)
- 1989: Mladen Kršek (YUG)
- 1990: Spyros Andriopoulos (GRE)
- 1992: Manolis Chantzos (GRE)
- 1994: Panayotis Charamis (GRE)
- 1996: Zeki Öztürk (TUR)
- 1997: Nicolae Negru (ROM)
- 1998: Metin Sazak (TUR)
- 1999: Metin Sazak (TUR)
- 2000: Ovidiu Tat (ROM)
- 2001: Not held
- 2002: Abdülkadir Türk (TUR)
- 2003: Not held
- 2004: Not held
- 2005: Not held

=== Marathon ===
- 1929: Christos Sarras (GRE)
- 1930: Nicolae Ilie (ROM)
- 1931: Christos Sarras (GRE)
- 1932: Ludovic Gal (ROM)
- 1933: Ludovic Gal (ROM)
- 1934: Stylianos Kyriakides (GRE)
- 1935: Ludovic Gal (ROM)
- 1936: Stylianos Kyriakides (GRE)
- 1937: Stylianos Kyriakides (GRE)
- 1938: Athanasios Ragazos (GRE)
- 1939: Stylianos Kyriakides (GRE)
- 1940: Athanasios Ragazos (GRE)
- 1946: Not held
- 1947: Not held
- 1953: Franjo Škrinjar (YUG)
- 1954: Franjo Škrinjar (YUG)
- 1955: Haydar Erturan (TUR)
- 1956: Franjo Mihalić (YUG)
- 1957: Franjo Škrinjar (YUG)
- 1958: Franjo Škrinjar (YUG)
- 1959: Franjo Škrinjar (YUG)
- 1960: Dobrivoje Stojanović (YUG)
- 1961: Franjo Škrinjar (YUG)
- 1962: Ivan Mustapić (YUG)
- 1963: Ivan Mustapić (YUG)
- 1964: Constantin Grecescu (ROM)
- 1965: Ivaylo Sharankov (BUL)
- 1966: İsmail Akçay (TUR)
- 1967: Ivaylo Sharankov (BUL)
- 1968: İsmail Akçay (TUR)
- 1969: Nedo Farčić (YUG)
- 1970: Hüseyin Aktaş (TUR)
- 1971: İsmail Akçay (TUR)
- 1972: Hüseyin Aktaş (TUR)
- 1973: İsmail Akçay (TUR) & Hüseyin Aktaş (TUR)
- 1974: Atanas Galabov (BUL)
- 1975: Atanas Galabov (BUL)
- 1976: Hüseyin Aktaş (TUR)
- 1977: Veli Balli (TUR)
- 1978: Vasil Lechev (BUL)
- 1979: Michalis Kousis (GRE)
- 1980: Dimitrios Psathas (GRE)
- 1981: Michalis Kousis (GRE)
- 1982: Gheorghe Buruiana (ROM)
- 1983: Mehmet Terzi (TUR)
- 1984: Mehmet Terzi (TUR)
- 1985: Tomislav Ašković (YUG)
- 1986: Mehmet Terzi (TUR)
- 1988: Mehmet Terzi (TUR)
- 1989: Christos Papachristos (GRE)
- 1990: Haydar Dogan (TUR)
- 1992: Cihangir Demirel (TUR)
- 1994: Not held
- 1996: Nikolaos Polias (GRE)
- 1997: Spyros Andriopoulos (GRE)
- 1998: Nikolaos Polias (GRE)
- 1999: Petko Stefanov (BUL)
- 2000: Petko Stefanov (BUL)
- 2001: Sreten Ninković (YUG)
- 2002: Arthur Miklos (ROM)
- 2003: Not held
- 2004: Not held
- 2005: Iaroslav Mușinschi (MDA)
- 2006: Yusuf Zepak (TUR)

=== 3000 metres steeplechase ===
- 1936: Ivan Krevs (YUG)
- 1937: Not held
- 1938: Not held
- 1939: Stavros Velkopoulos (GRE)
- 1940: Not held
- 1946: Not held
- 1947: Đorđe Stefanović (YUG)
- 1953: Petar Šegedin (YUG)
- 1954: Petar Šegedin (YUG)
- 1955: Georgios Papavasileiou (GRE)
- 1956: Georgios Papavasileiou (GRE)
- 1957: Georgios Papavasileiou (GRE)
- 1958: Georgios Papavasileiou (GRE)
- 1959: Georgios Papavasileiou (GRE)
- 1960: Georgios Papavasileiou (GRE)
- 1961: Georgios Papavasileiou (GRE)
- 1962: Ion Dandarau (ROM)
- 1963: Slavko Špan (YUG)
- 1964: Slavko Špan (YUG)
- 1965: Zoltan Vamoș (ROM)
- 1966: Zoltan Vamoș (ROM)
- 1967: Mikhail Zhelev (BUL)
- 1968: Mikhail Zhelev (BUL)
- 1969: Mikhail Zhelev (BUL)
- 1970: Mikhail Zhelev (BUL)
- 1971: Mikhail Zhelev (BUL)
- 1972: Gheorghe Cefan (ROM)
- 1973: Gheorghe Cefan (ROM)
- 1974: Gheorghe Cefan (ROM)
- 1975: Gheorghe Cefan (ROM)
- 1976: Gheorghe Cefan (ROM)
- 1977: Gheorghe Cefan (ROM)
- 1978: Paul Copu (ROM)
- 1979: Paul Copu (ROM)
- 1980: Vasile Bichea (ROM)
- 1981: Vasile Bichea (ROM)
- 1982: Arsenios Tsiminos (GRE)
- 1983: Arsenios Tsiminos (GRE)
- 1984: Panayot Kashanov (BUL)
- 1985: Fotis Kourtis (GRE)
- 1986: Kyriakos Moutesidis (GRE)
- 1988: Panayot Kashanov (BUL)
- 1989: Krenar Meçani (ALB)
- 1990: Vule Maksimović (YUG)
- 1992: Gabriel Kosmei (ROM)
- 1994: Florin Ionescu (ROM)
- 1996: Florin Ionescu (ROM)
- 1997: Florin Ionescu (ROM)
- 1998: Ion Avramescu (ROM)
- 1999: Florin Ionescu (ROM)
- 2000: Nikolaos Maxouris (GRE)
- 2001: Iaroslav Mușinschi (MDA)
- 2002: Iaroslav Mușinschi (MDA)
- 2003: Iaroslav Mușinschi (MDA)
- 2004: Ion Luchianov (MDA)
- 2005: Ionut Enache (ROM)

=== 110 metres hurdles ===
- 1929: Christos Mantikas (GRE)
- 1930: Christos Mantikas (GRE)
- 1931: Christos Mantikas (GRE)
- 1932: Christos Mantikas (GRE)
- 1933: Christos Mantikas (GRE)
- 1934: Christos Mantikas (GRE)
- 1935: Christos Mantikas (GRE)
- 1936: Christos Mantikas (GRE)
- 1937: Christos Mantikas (GRE)
- 1938: Boris Hanžeković (YUG)
- 1939: Christos Mantikas (GRE)
- 1940: Christos Mantikas (GRE)
- 1946: Ervin Srp (YUG)
- 1947: Ervin Srp (YUG)
- 1953: Stanko Lorger (YUG)
- 1954: Stanko Lorger (YUG)
- 1955: Stanko Lorger (YUG)
- 1956: Stanko Lorger (YUG)
- 1957: Stanko Lorger (YUG)
- 1958: Stanko Lorger (YUG)
- 1959: Stanko Lorger (YUG)
- 1960: Stanko Lorger (YUG)
- 1961: Stanko Lorger (YUG)
- 1962: Georgios Marsellos (GRE)
- 1963: Milad Petrušić (YUG)
- 1964: Georgios Marsellos (GRE)
- 1965: Athanasios Lazaridis (GRE)
- 1966: Milad Petrušić (YUG)
- 1967: Nicolae Pertea (ROM)
- 1968: Nicolae Pertea (ROM)
- 1969: Nicolae Pertea (ROM)
- 1970: Nicolae Pertea (ROM)
- 1971: Dragan Stoicević (YUG)
- 1972: Nicolae Pertea (ROM)
- 1973: Nicolae Pertea (ROM)
- 1974: Ervin Sebestyen (ROM)
- 1975: Borisav Pisić (YUG)
- 1976: Ervin Sebestyen (ROM)
- 1977: Ervin Sebestyen (ROM)
- 1978: Borisav Pisić (YUG)
- 1979: Borisav Pisić (YUG)
- 1980: Plamen Krastev (BUL)
- 1981: Plamen Krastev (BUL)
- 1982: Ion Oltean (ROM)
- 1983: Ion Oltean (ROM)
- 1984: Plamen Krastev (BUL)
- 1985: Liviu Giurgian (ROM)
- 1986: Liviu Giurgian (ROM)
- 1988: Georg Boroi (ROM)
- 1989: Liviu Giurgian (ROM)
- 1990: Georg Boroi (ROM)
- 1992: Georg Boroi (ROM)
- 1994: Laszlo Sarucan (ROM)
- 1996: Theocharis Varytimidis (GRE)
- 1997: Stamatios Magos (GRE)
- 1998: Zhivko Videnov (BUL)
- 1999: Zhivko Videnov (BUL)
- 2000: Dimitrios Siatounis (GRE)
- 2001: Ioannis Marakakis (GRE)
- 2002: Zhivko Videnov (BUL)
- 2003: Nenad Lončar (SCG)
- 2004: Alexandru Mihailescu (ROM)
- 2005: Alexandru Mihailescu (ROM)

=== 400 metres hurdles ===
- 1929: Vangelis Moiropoulos (GRE)
- 1930: Christos Mantikas (GRE)
- 1931: Vangelis Moiropoulos (GRE)
- 1932: Takis Hadjigeorgiou (GRE)
- 1933: Christos Mantikas (GRE)
- 1934: Christos Mantikas (GRE)
- 1935: Christos Mantikas (GRE)
- 1936: Christos Mantikas (GRE)
- 1937: Christos Mantikas (GRE)
- 1938: Christos Mantikas (GRE)
- 1939: Ioannis Skiadas (GRE)
- 1940: Faik Önem (TUR)
- 1946: Jerko Bulić (YUG)
- 1947: Virgil Ludu (ROM)
- 1953: Stamatis Smyrniotis (GRE)
- 1954: Ioannis Kambadelis (GRE)
- 1955: Ioannis Kambadelis (GRE)
- 1956: Ilie Savel (ROM)
- 1957: Ilie Savel (ROM)
- 1958: Ilie Savel (ROM)
- 1959: Ilie Savel (ROM)
- 1960: Ðani Kovač (YUG)
- 1961: Ðani Kovač (YUG)
- 1962: Valeria Iurca (ROM)
- 1963: Vladimir Tabakov (BUL)
- 1964: Ðani Kovač (YUG)
- 1965: Ðani Kovač (YUG)
- 1966: Valeria Iurca (ROM)
- 1967: Valeria Iurca (ROM)
- 1968: Virgil Mihaescu (ROM)
- 1969: Ion Ratoi (ROM)
- 1970: Stavros Tziortzis (GRE)
- 1971: Stavros Tziortzis (GRE)
- 1972: Stavros Tziortzis (GRE)
- 1973: Stavros Tziortzis (GRE)
- 1974: Stavros Tziortzis (GRE)
- 1975: Georgios Parris (GRE)
- 1976: Georgios Parris (GRE)
- 1977: Georgios Parris (GRE)
- 1978: Stavros Tziortzis (GRE)
- 1979: Rok Kopitar (YUG)
- 1980: Rok Kopitar (YUG)
- 1981: Krasimir Demirev (BUL)
- 1982: Horia Toboc (ROM)
- 1983: Rok Kopitar (YUG)
- 1984: Toma Tomov (BUL)
- 1985: Toma Tomov (BUL)
- 1986: Toma Tomov (BUL)
- 1988: Athanassios Kalogiannis (GRE)
- 1989: Athanassios Kalogiannis (GRE)
- 1990: Krasimir Demirev (BUL)
- 1992: Athanassios Kalogiannis (GRE)
- 1994: Mugur Mateescu (ROM)
- 1996: Mugur Mateescu (ROM)
- 1997: Alejandro Argudín-Zaharia (ROM)
- 1998: Vadim Zadoinov (MDA)
- 1999: Alin Larion (ROM)
- 2000: Iliya Dzhivondov (BUL)
- 2001: Iliya Dzhivondov (BUL)
- 2002: Martinos Adamopoulos (GRE)
- 2003: Panayotis Andriopoulos (GRE)
- 2004: Platon Gavelas (GRE)
- 2005: Platon Gavelas (GRE)

=== High jump ===
- 1929: Ivo Buratović (YUG)
- 1930: Nikolaos Papanikolaou (GRE)
- 1931: Nikolaos Papanikolaou (GRE)
- 1932: Nikolaos Papanikolaou (GRE)
- 1933: Haidar Asar (TUR)
- 1934: Ivo Buratović (YUG)
- 1935: Jovan Mikić (YUG)
- 1936: Konstantinos Pantazis (GRE)
- 1937: Konstantinos Pantazis (GRE)
- 1938: Fritz Martini (YUG)
- 1939: Nikos Lekatsas (GRE)
- 1940: Nikos Lekatsas (GRE)
- 1946: Petar Vuković (YUG)
- 1947: Ioan Soter (ROM)
- 1953: ?. Biskinis (GRE)
- 1954: Vladimir Marjanović (YUG)
- 1955: Ioannis Koinis (GRE)
- 1956: Vladimir Marjanović (YUG)
- 1957: Vladimir Marjanović (YUG)
- 1958: Çetin Şahiner (TUR)
- 1959: Cornel Porumb (ROM)
- 1960: Đorđe Majtan (YUG)
- 1961: Cornel Porumb (ROM)
- 1962: Eugen Ducu (ROM)
- 1963: Evgeni Yordanov (BUL)
- 1964: Alexandru Spiridon (ROM)
- 1965: Evgeni Yordanov (BUL)
- 1966: Alexandru Spiridon (ROM)
- 1967: Șerban Ioan (ROM)
- 1968: Miodrag Todosijević (YUG)
- 1969: Șerban Ioan (ROM)
- 1970: Ioannis Kousoulas (GRE)
- 1971: Șerban Ioan (ROM)
- 1972: Vasilios Papadimitriou (GRE)
- 1973: Vasilios Papadimitriou (GRE)
- 1974: Danial Temim (YUG)
- 1975: Dimitrios Patronis (GRE)
- 1976: Constantin Cîrstea (ROM)
- 1977: Dimitrios Patronis (GRE)
- 1978: Ekrem Özdamar (TUR)
- 1979: Dimitrios Patronis (GRE)
- 1980: Vaso Komnenić (YUG)
- 1981: Sašo Apostolovski (YUG)
- 1982: Sorin Matei (ROM)
- 1983: Sorin Matei (ROM)
- 1984: Constantin Militaru (ROM)
- 1985: Constantin Militaru (ROM)
- 1986: Eugen-Cristian Popescu (ROM)
- 1988: Sorin Matei (ROM)
- 1989: Eugen-Cristian Popescu (ROM)
- 1990: Eugen-Cristian Popescu (ROM)
- 1992: Robert Marinov (BUL)
- 1994: Labros Papakostas (GRE)
- 1996: Đorđe Niketić (YUG)
- 1997: Konstantinos Liapis (GRE)
- 1998: Dragutin Topić (YUG)
- 1999: Elvir Krehmić (BIH)
- 2000: Dimitris Syrrkas (GRE)
- 2001: Angel Kararadev (BUL)
- 2002: Ștefan Vasilache (ROM)
- 2003: Ștefan Vasilache (ROM)
- 2004: Dragutin Topić (SCG)
- 2005: Dragutin Topić (SCG)

=== Pole vault ===
- 1929: Argyris Karagiannis (GRE)
- 1930: Argyris Karagiannis (GRE)
- 1931: Spylios Andriopoulos (GRE)
- 1932: Spylios Andriopoulos (GRE)
- 1933: Lyuben Doychev (BUL)
- 1934: Lyuben Doychev (BUL)
- 1935: Georgios Thanos (GRE)
- 1936: Georgios Thanos (GRE)
- 1937: Georgios Thanos (GRE)
- 1938: Georgios Thanos (GRE)
- 1939: Georgios Thanos (GRE)
- 1940: Georgios Thanos (GRE)
- 1946: Zeno Dragomir (ROM)
- 1947: Zeno Dragomir (ROM)
- 1953: Rigas Efstathiadis (GRE)
- 1954: Georgios Roubanis (GRE)
- 1955: Rigas Efstathiadis (GRE)
- 1956: Milan Milakov (YUG)
- 1957: Georgios Roubanis (GRE)
- 1958: Georgios Roubanis (GRE)
- 1959: Georgios Roubanis (GRE)
- 1960: Khristo Khristov (BUL)
- 1961: Dimitar Khlebarov (BUL)
- 1962: Dimitar Khlebarov (BUL)
- 1963: Roman Lešek (YUG)
- 1964: Dimitar Khlebarov (BUL)
- 1965: Christos Papanikolaou (GRE)
- 1966: Christos Papanikolaou (GRE)
- 1967: Dimitar Khlebarov (BUL)
- 1968: Christos Papanikolaou (GRE)
- 1969: Christos Papanikolaou (GRE)
- 1970: Christos Papanikolaou (GRE)
- 1971: Christos Papanikolaou (GRE)
- 1972: Christos Papanikolaou (GRE)
- 1973: Cornel Anton (ROM)
- 1974: Theodoros Tongas (GRE)
- 1975: Dimitrios Kyteas (GRE)
- 1976: Dimitrios Kyteas (GRE)
- 1977: Christos Papanikolaou (GRE)
- 1978: Elias Sakellariadis (GRE)
- 1979: Atanas Tarev (BUL)
- 1980: Atanas Tarev (BUL)
- 1981: Ivo Yanchev (BUL)
- 1982: Dimitrios Kytteas (GRE)
- 1983: Andreas Tsonis (GRE)
- 1984: Ivo Yanchev (BUL)
- 1985: Atanas Tarev (BUL)
- 1986: Nikolai Nikolov (BUL)
- 1988: Atanas Tarev (BUL)
- 1989: Nikolai Nikolov (BUL)
- 1990: Galin Nikov (BUL)
- 1992: Galin Nikov (BUL)
- 1994: Christos Pallakis (GRE)
- 1996: Iliyan Efremov (BUL)
- 1997: Iliyan Efremov (BUL)
- 1998: Iliyan Efremov (BUL)
- 1999: Ruhan Işım (TUR)
- 2000: Iliyan Efremov (BUL)
- 2001: Spas Bukhalov (BUL)
- 2002: Iliyan Efremov (BUL)
- 2003: Iliyan Efremov (BUL)
- 2004: Marios Evangelou (GRE)
- 2005: Igor Šarčević (YUG)

=== Long jump ===
- 1929: Konstantinos Petridis (GRE)
- 1930: A. Bourlos (GRE)
- 1931: Ferdinand Novaković (YUG)
- 1932: Andreas Papamichalis (GRE)
- 1933: Ivo Buratović (YUG)
- 1934: Branko Kallay (YUG)
- 1935: Grigoris Lambrakis (GRE)
- 1936: Bondoc Ionescu-Crum (ROM)
- 1937: Grigoris Lambrakis (GRE)
- 1938: Grigoris Lambrakis (GRE)
- 1939: Pompiliu Stoichitescu (ROM)
- 1940: Dragutin Lazarević (YUG)
- 1946: Ion Moina (ROM)
- 1947: Stevan Lenert (YUG)
- 1953: Rade Radovanović (YUG)
- 1954: Rade Radovanović (YUG)
- 1955: Dimos Manglaras (GRE)
- 1956: Srđan Savić (YUG)
- 1957: Stoyan Slavkov (BUL)
- 1958: Todor Marinov (BUL)
- 1959: Dimos Manglaras (GRE)
- 1960: Dimos Manglaras (GRE)
- 1961: Ivan Ivanov (BUL)
- 1962: Raycho Tsonev (BUL)
- 1963: Raycho Tsonev (BUL)
- 1964: Dimos Manglaras (GRE)
- 1965: Adrian Samungi (ROM)
- 1966: Adrian Samungi (ROM)
- 1967: Petar Marin (ROM)
- 1968: Adrian Samungi (ROM)
- 1969: Miljenko Rak (YUG)
- 1970: Vasile Sarucan (ROM)
- 1971: Miljenko Rak (YUG)
- 1972: Vasile Sarucan (ROM)
- 1973: Nenad Stekić (YUG)
- 1974: Nenad Stekić (YUG)
- 1975: Stefan Lazarescu (ROM)
- 1976: Nenad Stekić (YUG)
- 1977: Dumitru Iordache (ROM)
- 1978: Nenad Stekić (YUG)
- 1979: Nenad Stekić (YUG)
- 1980: Nenad Stekić (YUG)
- 1981: Atanas Atanasov (BUL)
- 1982: Dimitrios Delifotis (GRE)
- 1983: Gheorghe Cojocaru (ROM)
- 1984: Atanas Atanasov (BUL)
- 1985: Atanas Atanasov (BUL)
- 1986: Atanas Chochev (BUL)
- 1988: Vladimir Amidzhinov (BUL)
- 1989: Dimitrios Delifotis (GRE)
- 1990: Siniša Ergotić (YUG)
- 1992: Konstandinos Koukodimos (GRE)
- 1994: Dimitros Hatzopoulos (GRE)
- 1996: Bogdan Tudor (ROM)
- 1997: Bogdan Țăruș (ROM)
- 1998: Danial Jahić (YUG)
- 1999: Bogdan Tudor (ROM)
- 2000: Petar Dachev (BUL)
- 2001: Mesut Yavaş (TUR)
- 2002: Petar Dachev (BUL)
- 2003: Bogdan Țăruș (ROM)
- 2004: Konstantinos Vassiliadis (GRE)
- 2005: Danut Simion (ROM)

=== Triple jump ===
- 1929: Konstantinos Petridis (GRE)
- 1930: Nikolaos Papanikolaou (GRE)
- 1931: Nikolaos Papanikolaou (GRE)
- 1932: Nikolaos Papanikolaou (GRE)
- 1933: Charalampos Paterakis (GRE)
- 1934: Charalampos Paterakis (GRE)
- 1935: Grigoris Lambrakis (GRE)
- 1936: Grigoris Lambrakis (GRE)
- 1937: Jovan Mikić (YUG)
- 1938: Ioannis Palamiotis (GRE)
- 1939: Ioannis Palamiotis (GRE)
- 1940: Ioannis Palamiotis (GRE)
- 1946: Ferdinand Calistrat (ROM)
- 1947: Ferdinand Calistrat (ROM)
- 1953: Rade Radovanović (YUG)
- 1954: Branislav Milovanović (YUG)
- 1955: Branislav Milovanović (YUG)
- 1956: Sorin Ioan (ROM)
- 1957: Lyuben Gurgushinov (BUL)
- 1958: Lyuben Gurgushinov (BUL)
- 1959: Lyuben Gurgushinov (BUL)
- 1960: Dodyu Patarinski (BUL)
- 1961: Sorin Ioan (ROM)
- 1962: Dodyu Patarinski (BUL)
- 1963: Georgi Stoykovski (BUL)
- 1964: Șerban Ciochină (ROM)
- 1965: Georgi Stoykovski (BUL)
- 1966: Șerban Ciochină (ROM)
- 1967: Șerban Ciochină (ROM)
- 1968: Georgi Stoykovski (BUL)
- 1969: Georgi Stoykovski (BUL)
- 1970: Carol Corbu (ROM)
- 1971: Carol Corbu (ROM)
- 1972: Carol Corbu (ROM)
- 1973: Apostolos Kathiniotis (GRE)
- 1974: Apostolos Kathiniotis (GRE)
- 1975: Carol Corbu (ROM)
- 1976: Carol Corbu (ROM)
- 1977: Milan Spasojević (YUG)
- 1978: Miloš Srejović (YUG)
- 1979: Ioannis Afthinos (GRE)
- 1980: Atanas Chochev (BUL)
- 1981: Dimitrios Mikhas (GRE)
- 1982: Bedros Bedrosian (ROM)
- 1983: Dimitrios Mikhas (GRE)
- 1984: Stoitsa Iliev (BUL)
- 1985: Khristo Markov (BUL)
- 1986: Charalambos Giannoulis (GRE)
- 1988: Đorđe Kožul (YUG)
- 1989: Spyros Kourmoussis (GRE)
- 1990: Zoran Đurđević (YUG)
- 1992: Laurentiu Colibaseanu (ROM)
- 1994: Kotzo Kostov (BUL)
- 1996: Dan Mitirica (ROM)
- 1997: Rostislav Dimitrov (BUL)
- 1998: Stamatios Lenis (GRE)
- 1999: Rostislav Dimitrov (BUL)
- 2000: Ivaylo Rusenov (BUL)
- 2001: Marian Oprea (ROM)
- 2002: Marian Oprea (ROM)
- 2003: Marian Oprea (ROM)
- 2004: Hristos Meletoglou (GRE)
- 2005: Daniel Donovici (ROM)

=== Shot put ===
- 1929: Elias Verginis (GRE)
- 1930: Elias Verginis (GRE)
- 1931: Alexandru Fritz (ROM)
- 1932: Nikola Kleut (YUG)
- 1933: Veysi Emre (TUR)
- 1934: Aleksandar Kovačević (YUG)
- 1935: Aleksandar Kovačević (YUG)
- 1936: Aleksandar Kovačević (YUG)
- 1937: Nicolae Gurau (ROM)
- 1938: Aleksandar Kovačević (YUG)
- 1939: Aleksandar Kovačević (YUG)
- 1940: Ararat Arat (TUR)
- 1946: Boriša Sušić (YUG)
- 1947: Ernõ Németvári (HUN)
- 1953: Petar Šarčević (YUG)
- 1954: Petar Šarčević (YUG)
- 1955: Georgios Tsakanikas (GRE)
- 1956: Todor Artarski (BUL)
- 1957: Georgios Tsakanikas (GRE)
- 1958: Todor Artarski (BUL)
- 1959: Georgios Tsakanikas (GRE)
- 1960: Georgios Tsakanikas (GRE)
- 1961: Georgios Tsakanikas (GRE)
- 1962: Milija Jocović (YUG)
- 1963: Boško Tomasović (YUG)
- 1964: Petar Barišić (YUG)
- 1965: Milija Jocović (YUG)
- 1966: Tomislav Šuker (YUG)
- 1967: Tomislav Šuker (YUG)
- 1968: Tomislav Šuker (YUG)
- 1969: Georgios Lemonis (GRE)
- 1970: Ivan Ivančić (YUG)
- 1971: Ivan Ivančić (YUG)
- 1972: Ivan Ivančić (YUG)
- 1973: Valcho Stoev (BUL)
- 1974: Valcho Stoev (BUL)
- 1975: Valcho Stoev (BUL)
- 1976: Nikola Khristov (BUL)
- 1977: Valcho Stoev (BUL)
- 1978: Nikola Khristov (BUL)
- 1979: Valcho Stoev (BUL)
- 1980: Valcho Stoev (BUL)
- 1981: Jovan Lazarević (YUG)
- 1982: Nikolay Gemizhev (BUL)
- 1983: Ivan Ivančić (YUG)
- 1984: Georgi Todorov (BUL)
- 1985: Ventsislav Khristov (BUL)
- 1986: Vladimir Milić (YUG)
- 1988: Georgi Todorov (BUL)
- 1989: Zlatan Saračević (YUG)
- 1990: Gheorghe Gușet (ROM)
- 1992: Gheorghe Gușet (ROM)
- 1994: Radoslav Despotov (BUL)
- 1996: Dragan Perić (YUG)
- 1997: Alexios Leonidis (GRE)
- 1998: Dragan Perić (YUG)
- 1999: Gheorghe Gușet (ROM)
- 2000: Gheorghe Gușet (ROM)
- 2001: Gheorghe Gușet (ROM)
- 2002: Gheorghe Gușet (ROM)
- 2003: Dragan Perić (SCG)
- 2004: Gheorghe Gușet (ROM)
- 2005: Gheorghe Gușet (ROM)

=== Discus throw ===
- 1929: Veljko Narančić (YUG)
- 1930: Veljko Narančić (YUG)
- 1931: Petre Havelet (ROM)
- 1932: Nikolaos Syllas (GRE)
- 1933: Kamen Ganchev (BUL)
- 1934: Nikolaos Syllas (GRE)
- 1935: Nikolaos Syllas (GRE)
- 1936: Nikolaos Syllas (GRE)
- 1937: Nikolaos Syllas (GRE)
- 1938: Nikolaos Syllas (GRE)
- 1939: Nikolaos Syllas (GRE)
- 1940: Nikolaos Syllas (GRE)
- 1946: Danilo Žerjal (YUG)
- 1947: Ferenc Klics (HUN)
- 1953: Konstantinos Giataganas (GRE)
- 1954: Vitomir Krivokapić (YUG)
- 1955: Darko Krnjajić (YUG)
- 1956: Dako Radošević (YUG)
- 1957: Antonios Kounadis (GRE)
- 1958: Todor Artarski (BUL)
- 1959: Todor Artarski (BUL)
- 1960: Todor Artarski (BUL)
- 1961: Dako Radošević (YUG)
- 1962: Todor Artarski (BUL)
- 1963: Dako Radošević (YUG)
- 1964: Dako Radošević (YUG)
- 1965: Todor Artarski (BUL)
- 1966: Todor Artarski (BUL)
- 1967: Iosif Naghi (ROM)
- 1968: Iosif Naghi (ROM)
- 1969: Iosif Naghi (ROM)
- 1970: Todor Artarski (BUL)
- 1971: Zdravko Pečar (YUG)
- 1972: Velko Velev (BUL)
- 1973: Velko Velev (BUL)
- 1974: Velko Velev (BUL)
- 1975: Iosif Naghi (ROM)
- 1976: Iosif Naghi (ROM)
- 1977: Ion Zamfirache (ROM)
- 1978: Emil Vladimirov (BUL)
- 1979: Velko Velev (BUL)
- 1980: Velko Velev (BUL)
- 1981: Velislav Prokhaska (BUL)
- 1982: Ion Zamfirache (ROM)
- 1983: Iosif Naghi (ROM)
- 1984: Kamen Dimitrov (BUL)
- 1985: Velko Velev (BUL)
- 1986: Kamen Dimitrov (BUL)
- 1988: Kamen Dimitrov (BUL)
- 1989: Marcel Tîrle (ROM)
- 1990: Nikolay Kolev (BUL)
- 1992: Costel Grasu (ROM)
- 1994: Christos Papadopoulos (GRE)
- 1996: Ilian Iliev (BUL)
- 1997: Costel Grasu (ROM)
- 1998: Sorin Stanescu (ROM)
- 1999: Ionel Oprea (ROM)
- 2000: Ionel Oprea (ROM)
- 2001: Savvas Panavoglou (GRE)
- 2002: Ionel Oprea (ROM)
- 2003: Sergiu Ursu (ROM)
- 2004: Ercüment Olgundeniz (TUR)
- 2005: Ercüment Olgundeniz (TUR)

=== Discus throw (Greek style) ===
- 1929: Kamen Ganchev (BUL)
- 1930: Kamen Ganchev (BUL)
- 1931: Kamen Ganchev (BUL)
- 1932: Kamen Ganchev (BUL)
- 1933: Kamen Ganchev (BUL)
- 1934: Nikolaos Syllas (GRE)
- 1935: Nikolaos Syllas (GRE)
- 1936: Nikolaos Syllas (GRE)
- 1937: Nikolaos Syllas (GRE)
- 1938: Nikolaos Syllas (GRE)
- 1939: Nikolaos Syllas (GRE)

=== Hammer throw ===
- 1930: Lazar Bodea (ROM)
- 1931: Pedro Goić (YUG)
- 1932: Pedro Goić (YUG)
- 1933: Pedro Goić (YUG)
- 1934: Milan Stepišnik (YUG)
- 1935: Pedro Goić (YUG)
- 1936: Christos Dimitropoulos (GRE)
- 1937: Christos Dimitropoulos (GRE)
- 1938: Pedro Goić (YUG)
- 1939: Milan Stepišnik (YUG)
- 1940: Milan Stepišnik (YUG)
- 1946: Ivan Gubijan (YUG)
- 1947: Imre Németh (HUN)
- 1953: Ivan Gubijan (YUG)
- 1954: Krešimir Račić (YUG)
- 1955: Ivan Gubijan (YUG)
- 1956: Zvonko Bezjak (YUG)
- 1957: Nicolae Rascanescu (ROM)
- 1958: Vasil Kroumov (BUL)
- 1959: Krešimir Račić (YUG)
- 1960: Zvonko Bezjak (YUG)
- 1961: Zvonko Bezjak (YUG)
- 1962: Constantin Dragulescu (ROM)
- 1963: Zvonko Bezjak (YUG)
- 1964: Vasil Kroumov (BUL)
- 1965: Frangiskos Politis (GRE)
- 1966: Gheorghe Costache (ROM)
- 1967: Gheorghe Costache (ROM)
- 1968: Gheorghe Costache (ROM)
- 1969: Georgios Babaniotis (GRE)
- 1970: Georgios Babaniotis (GRE)
- 1971: Srećko Štiglić (YUG)
- 1972: Stavros Moutaftsidis (GRE)
- 1973: Georgios Babaniotis (GRE)
- 1974: Todor Manolov (BUL)
- 1975: Tudor Stan (ROM)
- 1976: Todor Manolov (BUL)
- 1977: Emanuil Dyulgerov (BUL)
- 1978: Nicolae Bîndar (ROM)
- 1979: Nicolae Bîndar (ROM)
- 1980: Emanuil Dyulgerov (BUL)
- 1981: Emanuil Dyulgerov (BUL)
- 1982: Nicolae Bîndar (ROM)
- 1983: Rumen Kayrakov (BUL)
- 1984: Emanuil Dyulgerov (BUL)
- 1985: Plamen Minev (BUL)
- 1986: Ivan Tanev (BUL)
- 1988: Ivan Tanev (BUL)
- 1989: Plamen Minev (BUL)
- 1990: Ivan Tanev (BUL)
- 1992: Plamen Minev (BUL)
- 1994: Stavri Ivanov (BUL)
- 1996: Nikolaos Yentekos (GRE)
- 1997: Alexandros Papadimitriou (GRE)
- 1998: Nikolaos Yentekos (GRE)
- 1999: Alexandros Papadimitriou (GRE)
- 2000: Alexandros Papadimitriou (GRE)
- 2001: Alexandros Papadimitriou (GRE)
- 2002: Cosmin Sorescu (ROM)
- 2003: Alexandros Papadimitriou (GRE)
- 2004: Eşref Apak (TUR)
- 2005: Spyridon Jullien (GRE)

=== Javelin throw ===
- 1929: Georgios Zacharopoulos (GRE)
- 1930: Georgios Zacharopoulos (GRE)
- 1931: Vilim Messner (YUG)
- 1932: Napoleon Papageorgiou (GRE)
- 1933: Thiseas Michalopoulos (GRE)
- 1934: Kostas Chatzigiannis (GRE)
- 1935: Yasar Karakas (TUR)
- 1936: Napoleon Papageorgiou (GRE)
- 1937: Napoleon Papageorgiou (GRE)
- 1938: Napoleon Papageorgiou (GRE)
- 1939: Rudolf Markušić (YUG)
- 1940: Darko Mausar (YUG)
- 1946: Mirko Vujačić (YUG)
- 1947: Mirko Vujačić (YUG)
- 1953: Branko Dangubić (YUG)
- 1954: Stevan Pavlović (YUG)
- 1955: Milisav Pavlović (YUG)
- 1956: Mirko Vujačić (YUG)
- 1957: Mirko Vujačić (YUG)
- 1958: Alexandru Bizim (ROM)
- 1959: Alexandru Bizim (ROM)
- 1960: Alexandru Bizim (ROM)
- 1961: Božidar Miletić (YUG)
- 1962: Gheorghe Popescu (ROM)
- 1963: Gheorghe Popescu (ROM)
- 1964: Christos Pierrakos (GRE)
- 1965: Gheorghe Popescu (ROM)
- 1966: Gheorghe Popescu (ROM)
- 1967: Ivan Pavlov (BUL)
- 1968: Milcho Milenski (BUL)
- 1969: Milcho Milenski (BUL)
- 1970: Dezideriu Silaghi (ROM)
- 1971: Milcho Milenski (BUL)
- 1972: Zlatko Bezjak (YUG)
- 1973: Carol Raduly (ROM)
- 1974: Milcho Milenski (BUL)
- 1975: Valentin Dzhonev (BUL)
- 1976: Gheorghe Megelea (ROM)
- 1977: Valentin Dzhonev (BUL)
- 1978: Tudorel Pîrvu (ROM)
- 1979: Stefan Stoykov (BUL)
- 1980: Stefan Stoykov (BUL)
- 1981: Ivan Angelov (BUL)
- 1982: Ivan Angelov (BUL)
- 1983: Antonios Papadimitriou (GRE)
- 1984: Antonios Papadimitriou (GRE)
- 1985: Dumitru Negoiță (ROM)
- 1986: Sejad Krdžalić (YUG)
- 1988: Milan Stijepović (YUG)
- 1989: Radoman Šcekić (YUG)
- 1990: Dumitru Negoiță (ROM)
- 1992: Konstadinos Gatsioudis (GRE)
- 1994: Dimitrios Polymerou (GRE)
- 1996: Goran Bošnjak (YUG)
- 1997: Dimitrios Polymerou (GRE)
- 1998: Dimitrios Polymerou (GRE)
- 1999: Florin Turcu (ROM)
- 2000: Dimitrios Martatos (GRE)
- 2001: Eleutherios Karasmanakis (GRE)
- 2002: Eleutherios Karasmanakis (GRE)
- 2003: Eleutherios Karasmanakis (GRE)
- 2004: Levente Bartha (ROM)
- 2005: Levente Bartha (ROM)

=== Grenade throw ===
- 1946: Mirko Vujačić (YUG)
- 1947: Mirko Vujačić (YUG)

=== Decathlon ===
- 1939: Janko Klinar (YUG)
- 1940: Not held
- 1946: Not held
- 1947: Davorin Marčelja (YUG)
- 1953: Not held
- 1954: Stoyan Slavkov (BUL)
- 1955: Stoyan Slavkov (BUL)
- 1956: Stoyan Slavkov (BUL)
- 1957: Jože Brodnik (YUG)
- 1958: Jože Brodnik (YUG)
- 1959: Jože Brodnik (YUG)
- 1960: Mirko Kolnik (YUG)
- 1961: Curt Socol (ROM)
- 1962: Curt Socol (ROM)
- 1963: Vasile Muresan (ROM)
- 1964: Curt Socol (ROM)
- 1965: Spas Dzhurov (BUL)
- 1966: Spas Dzhurov (BUL)
- 1967: Curt Socol (ROM)
- 1968: Vasile Bogdan (ROM)
- 1969: Vasile Bogdan (ROM)
- 1970: Vasile Bogdan (ROM)
- 1971: Vasile Bogdan (ROM)
- 1972: Vasile Bogdan (ROM)
- 1973: Razvigor Yankov (BUL)
- 1974: Rumen Petrov (BUL)
- 1975: Vasile Bogdan (ROM)
- 1976: Atanas Andonov (BUL)
- 1977: Atanas Andonov (BUL)
- 1978: Lee Palles (GRE)
- 1979: Dicho Todorov (BUL)
- 1980: Atanas Andonov (BUL)
- 1981: Tsetsko Mitrakiev (BUL)
- 1982: Atanas Andonov (BUL)
- 1983: Tsetsko Mitrakiev (BUL)
- 1984: Saša Karan (YUG)
- 1985: Goran Kabić (YUG)
- 1986: Saša Karan (YUG)
- 1988: Savas Stafilidis (GRE)
- 1989: Alper Kasapoğlu (TUR)
- 1990: Prodromos Korkizoglou (GRE)
- 1992: Efthimios Andreoglou (GRE)
- 1994: Prodromos Korkizoglou (GRE)
- 1996: Konstantinos Papadopoulos (GRE)

=== 20 kilometres walk ===
The distance for the 1979 Balkan Championships in 20 kilometres walk was mismeasured, resulting in a 20.9 km distance. The event has been held on roads, with the exception of the 1982, 1989, 1997 and 1998 races which took place on a track.

- 1961: Stavros Chatzilaious (GRE)
- 1962: Stanimir Stoykov (BUL)
- 1963: Stanimir Stoykov (BUL)
- 1964: Ilie Popa (ROM)
- 1965: Leonid Caraiosifoglu (ROM)
- 1966: Leonid Caraiosifoglu (ROM)
- 1967: Leonid Caraiosifoglu (ROM)
- 1968: Leonid Caraiosifoglu (ROM)
- 1969: Leonid Caraiosifoglu (ROM)
- 1970: Leonid Caraiosifoglu (ROM)
- 1971: Constantin Staicu (ROM)
- 1972: Ion Gasitu (ROM)
- 1973: Constantin Stan (ROM)
- 1974: Evgeni Semerdzhiev (BUL)
- 1975: Vinko Galušić (YUG)
- 1976: Vinko Galušić (YUG)
- 1977: Yancho Kamenov (BUL)
- 1978: Constantin Staicu (ROM)
- 1979: Aristidis Karageorgos (GRE)
- 1980: Constantin Staicu (ROM)
- 1981: Alik Ibriamov (BUL)
- 1982: Constantin Stan (ROM)
- 1983: Alik Ibriamov (BUL)
- 1984: Lyubomir Ivanov (BUL)
- 1985: Lyubomir Ivanov (BUL)
- 1986: Alik Ibriamov (BUL)
- 1988: Dimitrios Orfanopoulos (GRE)
- 1989: Lyubomir Ivanov (BUL)
- 1990: Gheorghe Frecateanu (ROM)
- 1992: Spyridon Kastanis (GRE)
- 1994: Aleksandar Raković (YUG)
- 1996: Aleksandar Raković (YUG)
- 1997: Aleksandar Raković (YUG)
- 1998: Silviu Casandra (ROM)
- 1999: Costică Bălan (ROM)
- 2000: Costică Bălan (ROM)
- 2001: Costică Bălan (ROM)
- 2002: Silviu Casandra (ROM)
- 2003: Predrag Filipović (SCG)
- 2004: Costică Bălan (ROM)
- 2005: Silviu Casandra (ROM)
- 2006: Predrag Filipović (SCG)

=== 4 × 100 metres relay ===
- 1929: Greece (GRE)
- 1930: Greece (GRE)
- 1931: Turkey (TUR)
- 1932: Greece (GRE)
- 1933: Greece (GRE)
- 1934: Greece (GRE)
- 1935: Greece (GRE)
- 1936: Greece (GRE)
- 1937: Greece (GRE)
- 1938: Greece (GRE)
- 1939: Yugoslavia (YUG)
- 1940: Turkey (TUR)
- 1946: Yugoslavia (YUG)
- 1947: Hungary (HUN)
- 1953: Greece (GRE)
- 1954: Yugoslavia (YUG)
- 1955: Yugoslavia (YUG)
- 1956: Bulgaria (BUL)
- 1957: Romania (ROM)
- 1958: Bulgaria (BUL)
- 1959: Greece (GRE)
- 1960: Yugoslavia (YUG)
- 1961: Yugoslavia (YUG)
- 1962: Bulgaria (BUL)
- 1963: Bulgaria (BUL)
- 1964: Bulgaria (BUL)
- 1965: Bulgaria (BUL)
- 1966: Yugoslavia (YUG)
- 1967: Bulgaria (BUL)
- 1968: Bulgaria (BUL)
- 1969: Bulgaria (BUL)
- 1970: Yugoslavia (YUG)
- 1971: Yugoslavia (YUG)
- 1972: Greece (GRE)
- 1973: Greece (GRE)
- 1974: Bulgaria (BUL)
- 1975: Bulgaria (BUL)
- 1976: Bulgaria (BUL)
- 1977: Romania (ROM)
- 1978: Bulgaria (BUL)
- 1979: Bulgaria (BUL)
- 1980: Bulgaria (BUL)
- 1981: Yugoslavia (YUG)
- 1982: Greece (GRE)
- 1983: Yugoslavia (YUG)
- 1984: Bulgaria (BUL)
- 1985: Bulgaria (BUL)
- 1986: Bulgaria (BUL)
- 1988: Bulgaria (BUL)
- 1989: Bulgaria (BUL)
- 1990: Bulgaria (BUL)
- 1992: Greece (GRE)
- 1994: Greece (GRE)
- 1996: Greece (GRE)
- 1997: Greece (GRE)
- 1998: Greece (GRE)
- 1999: Greece (GRE)
- 2000: Yugoslavia (YUG)
- 2001: Romania (ROM)
- 2002: Greece (GRE)
- 2003: Greece (GRE)
- 2004: Romania (ROM)
- 2005: Greece (GRE)

=== 4 × 400 metres relay ===
- 1929: Greece (GRE)
- 1930: Greece (GRE)
- 1931: Yugoslavia (YUG)
- 1932: Greece (GRE)
- 1933: Greece (GRE)
- 1934: Greece (GRE)
- 1935: Greece (GRE)
- 1936: Greece (GRE)
- 1937: Yugoslavia (YUG)
- 1938: Yugoslavia (YUG)
- 1939: Greece (GRE)
- 1940: Not held
- 1946: Yugoslavia (YUG)
- 1947: Yugoslavia (YUG)
- 1953: Greece (GRE)
- 1954: Greece (GRE)
- 1955: Turkey (TUR)
- 1956: Romania (ROM)
- 1957: Romania (ROM)
- 1958: Romania (ROM)
- 1959: Yugoslavia (YUG)
- 1960: Yugoslavia (YUG)
- 1961: Yugoslavia (YUG)
- 1962: Yugoslavia (YUG)
- 1963: Greece (GRE)
- 1964: Yugoslavia (YUG)
- 1965: Yugoslavia (YUG)
- 1966: Bulgaria (BUL)
- 1967: Bulgaria (BUL)
- 1968: Bulgaria (BUL)
- 1969: Bulgaria (BUL)
- 1970: Yugoslavia (YUG)
- 1971: Yugoslavia (YUG)
- 1972: Yugoslavia (YUG)
- 1973: Yugoslavia (YUG)
- 1974: Yugoslavia (YUG)
- 1975: Yugoslavia (YUG)
- 1976: Yugoslavia (YUG)
- 1977: Yugoslavia (YUG)
- 1978: Yugoslavia (YUG)
- 1979: Yugoslavia (YUG)
- 1980: Yugoslavia (YUG)
- 1981: Yugoslavia (YUG)
- 1982: Yugoslavia (YUG)
- 1983: Bulgaria (BUL)
- 1984: Bulgaria (BUL)
- 1985: Yugoslavia (YUG)
- 1986: Yugoslavia (YUG)
- 1988: Yugoslavia (YUG)
- 1989: Yugoslavia (YUG)
- 1990: Bulgaria (BUL)
- 1992: Bulgaria (BUL)
- 1994: Greece (GRE)
- 1996: Yugoslavia (YUG)
- 1997: Greece (GRE)
- 1998: Greece (GRE)
- 1999: Yugoslavia (YUG)
- 2000: Yugoslavia (YUG)
- 2001: Greece (GRE)
- 2002: Romania (ROM)
- 2003: Romania (ROM)
- 2004: Greece (GRE)
- 2005: Romania (ROM)

=== 1600 metres Balkan medley relay ===
The initial event in 1929 was held over a longer distance.

- 1929: Romania (ROM)
- 1930: Yugoslavia (YUG)
- 1931: Greece (GRE)
- 1932: Greece (GRE)
- 1933: Greece (GRE)
- 1934: Greece (GRE)
- 1935: Greece (GRE)
- 1936: Greece (GRE)
- 1937: Romania (ROM)
- 1938: Yugoslavia (YUG)
- 1939: Greece (GRE)
- 1940: Greece (GRE)
- 1946: Romania (ROM)
- 1947: Hungary (HUN)

=== Partisans team walk ===
- 1946: Yugoslavia (YUG)
- 1947: Bulgaria (BUL)
