= Balkan Cross Country Championships =

Sporting competition

The Balkan Cross Country Championships has since 1958 been an annual regional international competition in cross country running amongst athletes from the Balkans. It forms part of the Balkan Games, the latter an event to encourage the relations amongst the participating nations surrounding the Mediterranean Sea and it traces its history back to 1940. There were no races in 2010). It is organised by the Association of the Balkan Athletics Federations

The championships features two events: a ten-kilometre (6.2-mile) race for men and an eight-kilometre (5-mile) race for women. The distances of the races have varied over the lifetime of the event. Originally the men's race was a 10 km race, but this changed to a 12 km (7.5 miles) race during the period from 1977 to 2008. The women's race began with a 2 km distance, increasing to 4 km in 1977, then 6 km from 1998 to 2008. National team competitions are held within the individual races, with each nation's score being the total of the finishing positions of their best three athletes.

The first edition in 1940 was a men's only competition; Josip Kotnik of Yugoslavia was the inaugural winner. A 15-year hiatus followed with the onset of World War II and the regional event was reborn in 1955. There was another hiatus to follow for two years but the 1958 edition, where Yugoslavia's Olympic medalist and International Cross Country champion Franjo Mihalić was victorious, marked the full establishment of the competition; the Balkan championship was contested annually thereafter. A women's race was held for the first time the following year and Akhad Dil Ciraj of Turkey became the first women's champion.

It is one of three major Balkan regional athletic championships, alongside the two annual track and field events – the Balkan Games and the Balkan Indoor Athletics Championships.

== Past winners ==
Edition	Year	Men's winner	Time (m:s)	Women's winner	Time (m:s)
1st	1940	Josip Kotnik (Kingdom of Yugoslavia)	24:40.4	Not held	
2nd	1955	Drago Štritof (YUG)	31:21.6	Not held	
3rd	1958	Franjo Mihalić (YUG)	31:33.8	Not held	
4th	1959	Ioanis Glecos (GRE)	31:58.8	Gül Çıray Akbaş (TUR)	7:04.6
5th	1960	Constantin Grecescu (ROM)	31:11.0	Gül Çıray Akbaş (TUR)	6:33
6th	1961	Constantin Grecescu (ROM)	32:34.0	Florica Grecescu (ROM)	7:04.4
7th	1962	Constantin Grecescu (ROM)	31:02.4	Gül Çıray Akbaş (TUR)	6:31.8
8th	1963	Muharrem Dalkılıç (TUR)	29:54.4	Florica Grecescu (ROM)	5:19.6
9th	1964	Andrei Barabaș (ROM)	30:25.8	Florica Grecescu (ROM)	6:40.8
10th	1965	Muharem Dalkilic (TUR)	30:37.6	Kipra Danailova (BUL)	6:34.6
11th	1966	Nicolae Mustata (ROM)	30:02	Kipra Danailova (BUL)	6:19
12th	1967	Zoltan Vamoș (ROM)	29:58.6	Vera Nikolić (YUG)	6:23.8
13th	1968	Mikhail Zhelev (BUL)	28:52.6	Viorica Gabor (ROM)	7:28.2
14th	1969	Danijel Korica (YUG)	30:05.0	Djurdjica Rajher (YUG)	6:21.8
15th	1970	Danijel Korica (YUG)	30:13.6	Veselinka Milošević (YUG)	6:21.4
16th	1971	Danijel Korica (YUG)	29:51.0	Veselinka Milosević (YUG)	6:10.2
17th	1972	Danijel Korica (YUG)	29:43.6	Djurdjica Rajher (YUG)	6:15.2
18th	1973	Nicolae Mustata (ROM)	28:37.8	Totka Petrova (BUL)	6:11.2
19th	1974	Peter Svet (YUG)	31:55.4	Totka Petrova (BUL)	6:35.2
20th	1975	Stevan Vulović (YUG)	31:12.6	Natalia Andrei (ROM)	6:12.2
21st	1976	Mehmet Yurdadön (TUR)	31:27.0	Natalia Marasescu-Betini (ROM)	6:38.1
22nd	1977	Ilie Floroiu (ROM)	36:46.4	Natalia Marasescu-Betini (ROM)	13:10.0
23rd	1978	Mehmet Yurdadön (TUR)	35:03.8	Fița Lovin (ROM)	13:01.4
24th	1979	Ilie Floroiu (ROM)	36:48.4	Maricica Puică (ROM)	13:31.2
25th	1980	Ilie Floroiu (ROM)	37:35	Fița Lovin (ROM)	13:50
26th	1981	Marios Kalanidis (GRE)	35:03.4	Maricica Puică (ROM)	12:37.7
27th	1982	Mehmet Yurdadön (TUR)	35:47.8	Maricica Puică (ROM)	12:59.8
28th	1983	Mehmet Yurdadön (TUR)	38:45.6	Fița Lovin (ROM)	14:36.2
29th	1984	Gyorgy Marko (ROM)	37:09.4	Maricica Puică (ROM)	13:26.8
30th	1985	Gyorgy Marko (ROM)	36:55.6	Mariana Chirila (ROM)	13:20.7
31st	1986	Evgeni Ignatov (BUL)	38:46.3	Elena Fidatov (ROM)	13:42.4
32nd	1987	Evgeni Ignatov (BUL)	35:42.6	Paula Ilie-Ivan (ROM)	12:21.0
33rd	1988	Mladen Kršek (YUG)	36:04.0	Violeta Beclea-Szekely (ROM)	12:55.2
34th	1989	Evgeni Ignatov (BUL)	36:33.3	Iulia Besliu-Ionescu (ROM)	13:23.6
35th	1990	Goran Raičević (YUG)	32:32.6	Elena Fidatov (ROM)	13:05
36th	1991	Haydar Dogan (TUR)	36:37.1	Lenuta Alungulesei (ROM)	12:21.4
37th	1992	Goran Raičević (FR Yugoslavia)	34:08.0	Daniela Bran (ROM)	12:37.7
38th	1993	Zeki Öztürk (TUR)	36:08.1	Irini Theodoridou (GRE)	13:01.4
39th	1994	Goran Raičević (FR Yugoslavia)	35:30.0	Luminita Gogârlea (ROM)	12:43.5
40th	1995	Nicolae Negru (ROM)	36:09.2	Stela Olteanu (ROM)	13:11.0
41st	1996	Nicolae Negru (ROM)	38:06	Nuța Olaru (ROM)	14:11.6
42nd	1997	Nicolae Negru (ROM)	35:23.3	Olivera Jevtić (FR Yugoslavia)	12:54.8
43rd	1998	Dragoslav Prpa (FR Yugoslavia)	36:03.7	Olivera Jevtić (FR Yugoslavia)	19:18.8
44th	1999	Nicolae Negru (ROM)	34:50	Olivera Jevtić (FR Yugoslavia)	18:52
45th	2000	Dragoslav Prpa (FR Yugoslavia)	34:46	Olivera Jevtić (FR Yugoslavia)	19:42
46th	2001	Panagiotis Kharamis (GRE)	35:49.2	Maria Cristina Grosu-Mazilu (ROM)	19:03.7
47th	2002	Goran Stojilković (FR Yugoslavia)	34:20	Olivera Jevtić (FR Yugoslavia)	19:51
48th	2003	Labros Zaraggas (GRE)	37:33	Sonja Stolić (SCG)	20:10
49th	2004	Mirko Petrović (SRB)	36:24	Olivera Jevtić (SRB)	19:31
50th	2005	Abdülkadir Turk (TUR)	40:38	Cristina Casandra (ROM)	22:22
51st	2006	Abdil Ceylan (TUR)	38:51	Cristina Casandra (ROM)	21:11
52nd	2007	Marius Ionescu (ROM)	37:27	Sonja Stolić (SRB)	20:32
53rd	2008	Mirko Petrović (SRB)	36:15	Sonja Stolić (SRB)	18:30
54th	2009	Fatih Bilgic (TUR)	31:37.7	Konstantina Kefala (GRE)	28:28.9
—	2010	Not held			
55th	2011	Mirko Petrović (SRB)	30:39	Olivera Jevtić (SRB)	27:45
56th	2012	Bekir Karayel (TUR)	28:59	Ancuța Bobocel (ROM)	26:47
57th	2013	Marius Ionescu (ROM)	31:09	Sonja Stolić (SRB)	28:00
58th	2014	Vedat Günen (TUR)	28:23	Özlem Kaya (TUR)	26:16
59th	2015	Hasan Pak (TUR)	31:17	Ancuța Bobocel (ROM)	27:42
60th	2016	Ramazan Özdemir (TUR)	30:11	Ancuța Bobocel (ROM)	27:05
61st	2017	Sedat Gönen (TUR)	33:41	Roxana Bârcă (ROM)	30:11
62nd	2018	Cihat Ulus (TUR)	29:25	Paula Todoran (ROM)	26:35
63rd	2019	Yitayew ABUHAY (ISR)	30:25	Nataliya LEHONKOVA (UKR)	27:34
—	2020	Not held			
64th	2021	Cancelled			
—	2022	Not held			
65th	2023	Ivo Balabanov (BUL)	30:44	Luiza Gega (ALB)	27:16
66th	2024	David Nikolli (ALB)	30:25	Sümeyye Erol (TUR)	27:33
67th	2025	Andriy Atamaniuk (UKR)	31:34	Sümeyye Erol (TUR)	28:21
68th	2026	Ivo Balabanov (BUL)	33:05	Ivanna Chereshnyovska (UKR)	29:49

== Participating countries ==
=== Present ===
1. Albania
2. Armenia
3. Bosnia and Herzegovina
4. Bulgaria
5. Croatia
6. Greece
7. North Macedonia
8. Moldova
9. Montenegro
10. Romania
11. Serbia
12. Turkey

=== Other Member ===
1. Azerbaijan
2. Georgia
3. Cyprus
4. Israel
5. Kosovo
6. San Marino
7. Slovenia
8. Ukraine

http://www.balkan-athletics.eu/members.php

=== Former ===
1. Kingdom of Yugoslavia (1940)
2. Yugoslavia (1943–1992)
3. FR Yugoslavia (1992–2003)
4. Serbia and Montenegro (2003–2006)
