= 1935 AAA Championships =

Outdoor track and field competition

- Dates: 12–13 July 1935
- Host city: London, England
- Venue: White City Stadium
- Level: Senior
- Type: Outdoor
- Events: 24

The 1935 AAA Championships was the 1935 edition of the annual outdoor track and field competition organised by the Amateur Athletic Association (AAA). It was held from 12 to 13 July 1935 at White City Stadium in London, England.

The Championships consisted of 24 events and covered two days of competition.

== Results ==
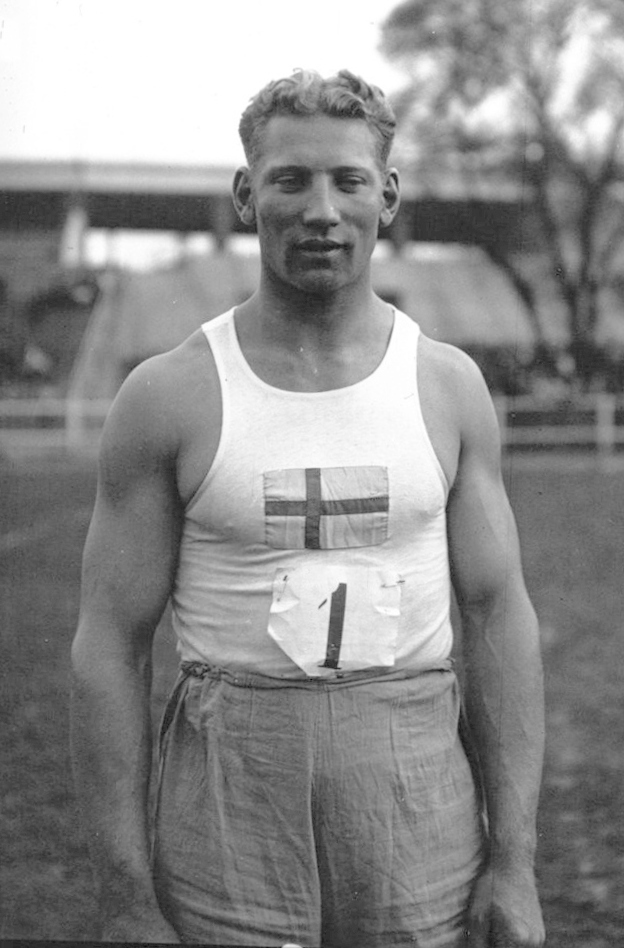
Harald Andersson

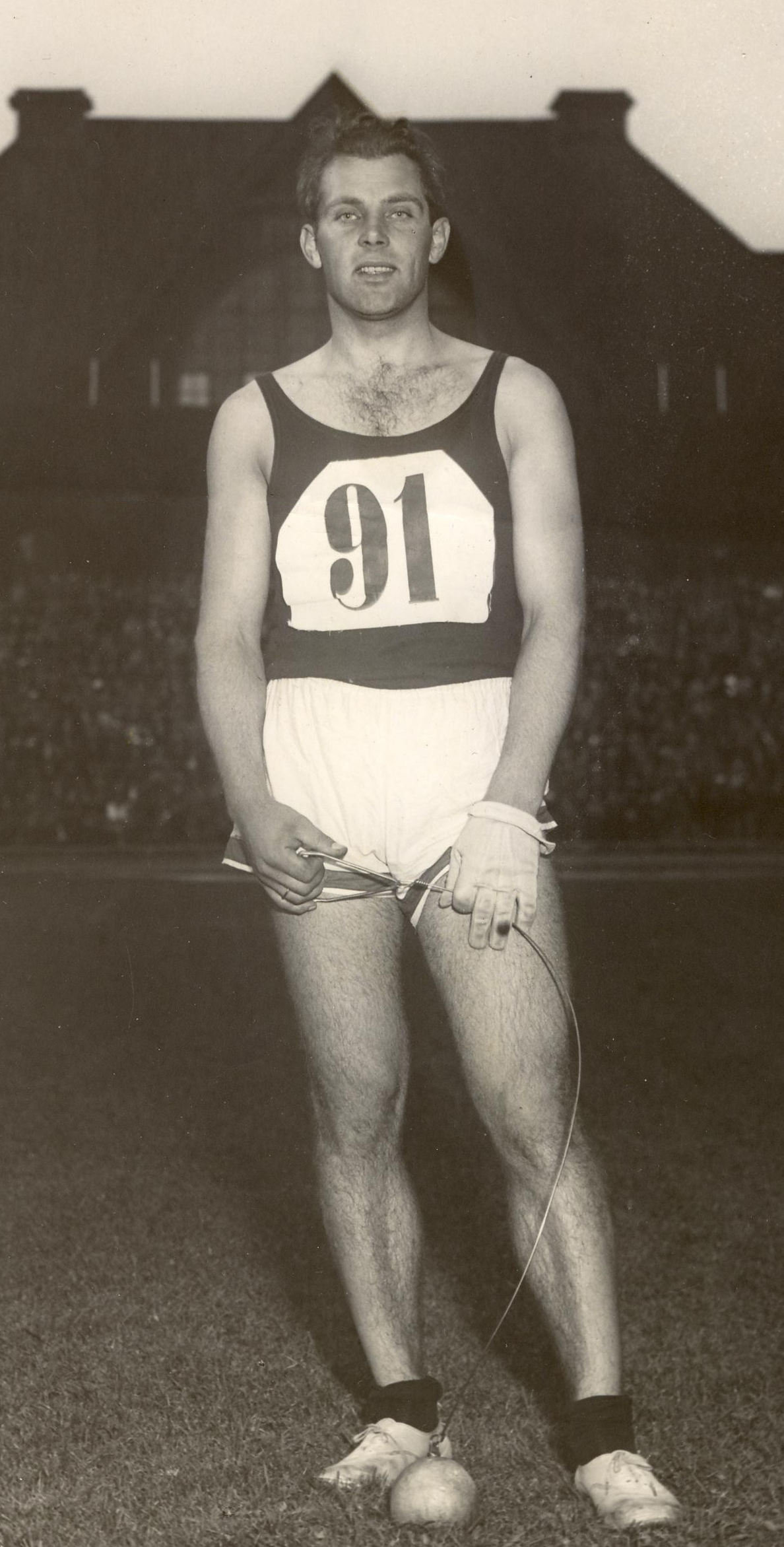
Fred Warngård

Event	Gold		Silver		Bronze	
100 yards	Arthur Sweeney	10.2	(Netherlands) Tinus Osendarp	1 ft	(Hungary) József Sir	½ yd
220 yards	(Netherlands) Tinus Osendarp	22.2	Arthur Sweeney	1½ yd	Walter Rangeley	1 ft
440 yards	Bill Roberts	49.0	(France) Raymond Boisset	49.5	John Anderson	49.8
880 yards	(Scotland) James Stothard	1:53.3	Jack Powell	1:53.8	Ralph Scott	1:53.9
1 mile	Sydney Wooderson	4:17.4	(New Zealand) Jack Lovelock	4:18.4	Bernard Eeles	4:18.6
3 miles	Aubrey Reeve	14:38.0	Walter Beavers	14:38.4	Alec Burns	14:46.8
6 miles	Jack Holden	30:54.6	(Hungary) János Kelen	30:55.0	Norman Jones	30:59.5
10 miles	Frank Marsland	54:38.6	Reginald Walker	55:05.0	Frank Wildsmith	55:27.0
marathon	Albert Norris	3:02:57.8	(Greece) Stylianos Kyriakides	3:03:20.0	Arthur Chamberlain	3:20:15.0
steeplechase	George Bailey	10:20.4	James Ginty	10:29.8	Bernard Fishwick	10:38.4
120y hurdles	Don Finlay	15.0	(Greece) Christos Mantikas	2 yd	Ashleigh Pilbrow	2 yd
440y hurdles	(Scotland) Alan Hunter	55.3	Ralph Kilner Brown	56.0	(Greece) Christos Mantikas	56.4
2 miles walk	Bert Cooper	13:46.6	Don Brown	13:53.8	Leslie Dickinson	14:19.4
7 miles walk	Henry Hake	53:48.0	Albert Plumb	55:33.0	Alf Pope	56:04.0
high jump	Stanley West	1.905	(France) Jean Moiroud	1.829	(Hungary) Kornél Késmárki	1.778
pole vault	(United States) Keith Brown	4.21	(France) Pierre Ramadier	3.96	(France) Robert Vintousky	3.85
long jump	(France) Robert Paul	7.28	(Hungary) Henrik Koltai	7.08	Sandy Duncan	7.08
triple jump	(Netherlands) Willem Peters	14.29	Jack Higginson Jr.	13.68	John Howe	13.53
shot put	(Netherlands) Aad de Bruyn	14.88	Robert Howland	13.93	Kenneth Pridie	12.55
discus throw	(Sweden) Harald Andersson	51.82	(Greece) Nikolaos Syllas	48.81	(Hungary) István Donogán	45.23
hammer throw	(Sweden) Fred Warngård	44.58	(Scotland) Jim Rioch	43.66	(Scotland) William Mackenzie	43.34
javelin throw	(Sweden) Lennart Atterwall	65.70	(Latvia) Oto Jurģis	63.02	(Netherlands) Jaap van der Poll	60.44
440 yards relay	Budapesti Budai Torna Egylet	42 3–5sec	Polytechnic Harriers			
Tug of war	RASC Feltham		Royal Marines		Royal Ulster Constabulary; Reigate Borough Police	

== See also ==
- 1935 WAAA Championships
