= Frangoudis =

Frangoudis is a surname. Notable people with the surname include:

- Rennos Frangoudis
- Ioannis Frangoudis
