= Pantazis =

Pantazis (Greek: Πανταζής) is a Greek family name. It is derived from the wish "live forever!" (Greek: "πάντα να ζει!" or "πάντα ζεις!"). Notable people with this name include:

- Andreas Pantazis (born 2000), Greek triple jumper
- Konstantinos Pantazis (1915–…), Greek athlete
- Lefteris Pantazis (born 1955), Greek singer
- Périclès Pantazis (1849–1884), Greek impressionist painter

== See also ==
- Pantazi
