= Goran Raičević =

Serbian long-distance runner

Personal information
- Nationality: Yugoslav^{1}
- Born: June 26, 1963 Kruševac, Yugoslavia
- Died: May 6, 1999 (aged 35) Medveđa, Yugoslavia

Sport
- Sport: Track, long-distance running
- Event(s): 5000 meters, marathon
- Club: AK Partizan

Achievements and titles
- Personal best(s): 1500m: 3:42.94; 5000m: 13:49.60; 10,000m: 29:21.25; Marathon: 2:15:28

Goran Raičević (Serbian Cyrillic: Горан Раичевић, June 26, 1963 – May 6, 1999) was a Serbian long-distance runner. He won three Balkan Cross Country Championships for Yugoslavia in 1990, 1992, and 1994. His son Nikola Raičević took up athletics and trains with AK Partizan.

== Running career ==
Raičević won his first Balkan Cross Country Championships in 1990. In the same year he ran the senior men's race at the 1990 IAAF World Cross Country Championships, finishing in 119th place out of 236 finishers. Raičević would also represent FR Yugoslavia at IAAF World Cross Country Championships in 1994 and 1996, recording strong finishing places and results in both years.

On April 20, 1996, he ran the Belgrade Half Marathon in 1:02:39, although the course was short according to the Association of Road Racing Statisticians. He ran his last marathon on October 4, 1998 at the Podgorica Marathon, where he ran a personal best of 2:15:28, only 12 seconds behind first place Petko Stefanov.

== Military service and death ==
Throughout the 1990s, in addition to conscription to the Yugoslav Army being mandatory for all able male citizens, unrest and eventually war took place in Kosovo as well as in the surrounding areas from 1997. Raičević was killed in action on May 6, 1999, by KLA insurgents in Medveđa. He is buried in his birthplace, Strojinci. A statue and an annual memorial race are dedicated to Goran in Brus.

== Notes ==
- ^1 Although Raičević was born in present-day Serbia, his presence in international athletic competition dates before the Constitutional Charter of Serbia and Montenegro, so the country he represented in athletics is cited as (Federal Republic of) Yugoslavia as opposed to Serbia. Some of Raičević's personal best results are maintained by Serbia's Athletic Association as Serbian results.
