= Pantazi =

Pantazi is a Greek surname. Notable people with the surname include:

- Angeliki Pantazi (born 1982), Greek computer engineer
- Charikleia Pantazi (born 1985), Greek rhythmic gymnast
- Cleopatra Pantazi (born 1963), Greek singer
- Constantin Pantazi (1888–1958), Romanian army general and politician
- Elissavet Pantazi (born 1956), Greek hurdler

== See also ==
- Pantazis, another Greek surname
- Pantazi Ghica (1831–1882), Romanian politician and writer
- Valeriu Pantazi (1940–2015), born Pantazie Valeriu Constantinescu, Romanian painter and writer
