= Alfred König =

Austrian sprinter

Alfred König; also known as Ali Ferit Gören
Personal information
- Nationality: Austrian (Austria); Turkish (Turkey)
- Born: 2 October 1913 Vienna, Austria
- Died: 1987; 74 years old Istanbul, Turkey
- Home town: Vienna, Austria, and Turkey

Sport
- Sport: Sprinting
- Event(s): 100 metres, 200 metres, 400 metres
- Club: Hakoah Vienna

Achievements and titles
- National finals: 200m (Austrian Junior Champion, 1932); 4x400m relay (Austrian Championship team, 1934); 400m (Austrian Champion, 1936); 4x100m relay (Austrian Championship team, 1937); 4x400m relay (Austrian Championship team, 1937)
- Personal bests: 200m -- 22.0 (1936); 400m -- 49.1 (1936)
Medal record
Men's athletics
Representing Austria
Maccabiah Games
Gold medal – first place	1935 Mandatory Palestine	200m
Gold medal – first place	1935 Mandatory Palestine	4x400m relay
Silver medal – second place	1935 Mandatory Palestine	400m
Bronze medal – third place	1935 Mandatory Palestine	4x100m relay
Representing Turkey
Balkan Games
Gold medal – first place	1938 Belgrade	400m
Gold medal – first place	1939 Athens	400m
Silver medal – second place	1939 Athens	4x400m relay
Bronze medal – third place	1938 Belgrade	200m
Bronze medal – third place	1939 Athens	200m
Bronze medal – third place	1939 Athens	medley relay

Alfred König, also known as Ali Ferit Gören and Alfred Göring (born 2 October 1913 – 1987), was an Austrian-Turkish Olympic sprinter. He was Austrian national champion in the 200m juniors in 1932, the 400m in 1936, the 4x100m relay in 1937, and the 4x400m relay in 1934 and 1937. At the 1935 Maccabiah Games in Mandatory Palestine, he won a gold medal in the 200m, was part of the gold medal winning 4x400m relay, won a silver medal in the 400m, and won a bronze medal in the 4x100m relay. He competed at the 1936 Summer Olympics in Berlin, Germany.

He moved to Turkey following the Anschluss in 1938, and running under the name Ali Ferit Gören in 1938 he broke the Turkish national record while winning the 1938 Balkan Games 400 m title. In 1939, he successfully defended his 400m Balkan Games gold medal, and won three other medals.

== Early life ==
König was born in Vienna, Austria, and was Jewish. His father Jakob was a merchant who spent many years in Istanbul, Turkey, and his mother was Emma (née Geiger) König. He lived in Vienna and in Turkey in his childhood. His family moved back to Austria in the late 1920s.

== Running career ==
=== Austria ===
König became a runner, and competed at distances from 100m to 400m. He began to compete for Hakoah Vienna around 1930.

In 1932 he was the Austrian junior champion at 400m. With the rise of fascism in Austria new citizenship laws were enacted which affected the eligibility of Austrian athletes to compete in championships, set national records, and represent Austria in international competition. König lost his junior titles retrospectively and reverted to being a Turkish national.

In 1934 he won the Austrian title as a member of a team in the 4x400m relay.

He competed in the 1935 Maccabiah Games in Mandatory Palestine. There, he won a gold medal in the 200m dash, was part of the gold medal winning 4x400m relay, won a silver medal in the 400m race, and won a bronze medal in the 4x100m relay.

In 1936 he won the Austrian national 400m title.

He competed in the men's 200 metres and men's 400m at the 1936 Summer Olympics in Berlin, Germany.

In 1937, he won Austrian titles as a member of teams in the 4x100m relay and the 4x400m relay.

=== Turkey ===
Following the Anschluss in 1938, the invasion of Austria by Nazi Germany, and the removal of many of the rights of Jewish Austrians, he returned to Turkey on 22 July 1938, to escape Nazi oppression. He settled in Istanbul, became a Turkish citizen, and ran there under the name Ali Ferit Gören.

In 1938 he broke the Turkish national record, with a time of 49.0 that was not surpassed for seven years, while winning the 1938 Balkan Games 400 m title in Belgrade. He placed third in the 200m. In 1939, he successfully defended his 400m Balkan Games gold medal in Athens. He also won a silver medal in the 4x400m, and bronze medals at 200m and in the medley relay at the 1939 Games.

He competed sporadically until 1944, and later coached local athletes into the 1970s. He trained athletes as a sports teacher at Kuleli Military High School in Istanbul.

He had personal bests in the 200m of 22.0 (1936), and in the 400m of 49.1 (1936).

He died in 1987 in Istanbul, Turkey, at 74 years of age.

== See also ==
- List of Balkan Athletics Championships winners (men)
