= Stylianos Kyriakides =

Greek distance runner (1910–1987)

Stelios Kyriakides
Personal information
- Nationality: Greek Cypriot
- Born: 15 January 1910 Statos, near Paphos, Cyprus
- Died: 10 December 1987 (aged 77)

Sport
- Sport: Athletics
- Event: marathon

Stylianos "Stelios" Kyriakides (Greek: Στυλιανός «Στέλιος» Κυριακίδης; 15 January 1910 – 10 December 1987) was a Greek Cypriot marathon runner who came first at the Boston Marathon in 1946, with the aim of raising money to provide food and shelter to the Greeks, who were experiencing severe poverty after the Second World War and Greek Civil War.

== Biography ==
Kyriakides was born in the mountain village of Statos, near Paphos, Cyprus on 15 January 1910.

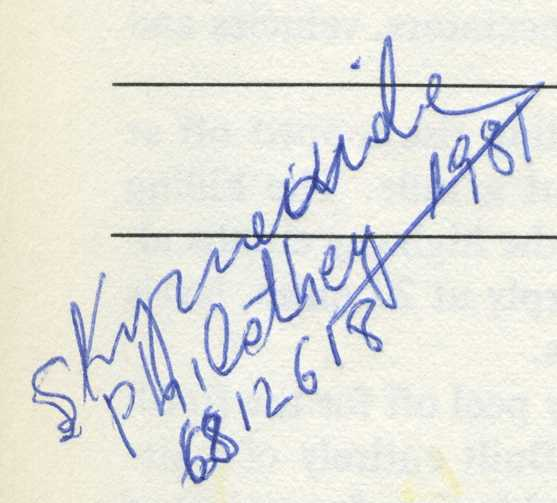
Signature of Stylianos Kyriakides, 1981

The youngest of five children, born prematurely, he left home to find work and help his poor farming family. Following a variety of jobs he ended up as a ‘house-boy’ for Dr Reginald Cheverton, a British medical officer. (Cyprus was still under British rule at the time.) An athlete himself, Cheverton encouraged the 22-year-old Kyriakides to start running, coached him, gave him his first running gear, and taught him to speak English.

At his first Pan-Cyprian games in 1932, Kyriakides won both the 1,500 and 10,000 metres on Friday, followed by both the 5,000 and 20,000 metres on Sunday. Hailed as a great talent, he was asked to run in the national championships in Greece, where he came first in the Marathon. Kyriakides finished second behind Bert Norris in the marathon event at the British 1935 AAA Championships.

Kyriakides competed for Greece in the 1936 Summer Olympics, placing eleventh. He was invited by his friend and fellow Berlin marathoner, Johnny Kelley, to participate in the Boston Marathon in the late 1930s. On the day of the marathon, he wore new shoes, which injured his feet and caused him to drop out of the race. He took a taxi to the finish line, but told The Boston Globe, "Someday, I'm going to come back and win this race."

He returned to Greece, and survived the German occupation during World War II. Between 1942 and 1944, Kyriakides was part of the Greek resistance. With the Greek Civil War raging, he returned to win the 1946 Boston Marathon. In order to get there, he had to sell his furniture, enabling him to buy a single ticket. According to a newspaper report, he was running with Johnny Kelley near the end, when an old man shouted from the crowd, 'For Greece, for your children!', inspiring him to pull away and win the race in 2:29:27, the fastest marathon time of 1946, and 14 minutes faster than his previous best time. According to Life magazine, he shouted 'For Greece' as he crossed the finish line. He begged America for its help—and Americans responded. When he returned to Greece, he arrived with 25,000 tons of supplies in American aid, including $250,000 in cash. Over one million Greeks from all over the country lined the streets of Athens to greet him. Johnny Kelley purchased the shoes that Stelios Kyriakides used in his victory.

In 1948, Kyriakides finished eighteenth in the Olympic marathon at the London Games. He died in Athens in 1987.

A sculpture of Kyriakides called 'The Spirit of the Marathon' was unveiled in 2004, at the 1-mile mark of the marathon in Hopkinton. It was commissioned by the Hopkinton Athletic Association and was dedicated in 2006 to mark the 60th anniversary of Kyriakides' victory in the 1946 race.

'The winner of the 50th Boston Marathon, Kyriakides used his victory as a call to action to aid his war and famine-ravaged homeland. Kyriakides, who narrowly escaped execution during World War II during the Nazi occupation of Greece, hadn't run in six years when he came to Boston in 1946, with the help of Greek-American benefactors (George Demeter and Spear Demeter). He was emaciated from the lack of food in war-ravaged Greece, and at one point was told by doctors in Boston he wouldn't be allowed to run because they were afraid he would die in the streets. That backdrop only added to the almost mythic race performance, in which Kyriakides came on at the end to defeat the defending champion and set the best time in the world for 1946. Nearly a million people greeted him on his return to Athens in May 1946, when he came back with boat loads of food, medicine, clothing and other essentials donated by Americans who read of his victory.'

== The "Package Kyriakides" ==
Following the 1946 Boston Marathon, Kyriakides stayed for about a month in America, gathering economic aid for Greece. As his victory raised sympathy from Americans and Greeks, he eventually managed to reach an amount of 250.000 Dollars while the Livanos family sent two ships with basic necessities (food, clothing and medicine). This assistance was called 'Package Kyriakides'. In May 1947, a year after his victory and as a result of the publicity given to the economic problems of Greece as a result of the Boston Marathon, the US government sent an amount of 400.000 Dollars before the Marshall Plan. On 23 May 1946, Kyriakides returned to Greece, where about one million Greeks greeted him as a hero. Then, a formal ceremony was held at the Temple of Zeus, where Kyriakides stating 'I am proud to be Greek', which moved the crowd. For the first time since the Nazi Occupation, the Acropolis was illuminated in his honor.

== Honours ==
Overall, Stelios Kyriakides was a 14-time winner in Pancyprian games (two in a marathon) and Greek champion 11 times (three in a marathon). In 1933, in his first participation in the Balkan races, he finished second behind Romanian Gal. In 1934 in Zagreb he won the first gold medal out of six in the Balkan games (4 in a marathon). With the Greece national team scored a total of 36 best national performance and has participated in two Olympic Games in Berlin in 1936 and London in 1948.

Stelios Kyriakides was awarded the Grand Cross of the Phoenix by King of the Greeks. He has also been honored for his contribution from the municipalities of Athens, Piraeus, Filothei, Patras, as well as the Governor of Massachusetts, the Olympic Committee of USA, and others. In the Sports Museum in Massachusetts there is a permanent exhibition in honor of Stelios Kyriakides, with the title 'Stylianos Kyriakides - Running for mankind'. In 2004—after an award from the Athletic Federation of Hopkinton—the City of Hopkinton ( MA ) unveiled a statue called 'The Spirit of the Marathon' on the route of the Boston Marathon, one mile from the starting point. The sculpture presents Stelios Kyriakides running besides Spyros Louis, who shows him the way to victory. In 2006, the statue was dedicated on the 60th anniversary of his victory. A copy of the same sculpture has been placed in the Municipality of Marathon in Greece.

On 25 May 2017, Pafiako Stadium, located in the city of Pafos, Cyprus, changed its name to Stelios Kyriakides Stadium.

In 2020 he was commemorated by a stamp from the Cyprus post.

== See also ==
- List of winners of the Boston Marathon

== Sources ==
- Nick Tsiotos and Andy Dabilis, Running With Pheidippides: Stylianos Kyriakides, the Miracle Marathoner (Syracuse University Press, 2001).
- Amazon.com listing for Running With Pheidippides
- Documentary about Kyriakides that aired before the closing ceremonies to the 2004 Olympics in Athens.

=== Video ===
- Documentary about Stelios Kyriakides, Starts at 8:10
