= Goic =

Goic or Goić is a surname. Notable people with the surname include:

- Alejandro Goic (actor) (born 1957), Chilean actor
- Alejandro Goić (bishop) (1940–2025), Chilean Roman Catholic bishop
- Carolina Goic (born 1972), Chilean politician
- Pedro Goić (1896–1995), Croatian athlete
