= Henrik Koltai =

Hungarian long jumper

Personal information
- Nationality: Hungarian
- Born: 11 May 1913 Somogyszil, Somogy, Hungary
- Height: 179 cm (5 ft 10 in)
- Weight: 72 kg (159 lb)

Sport
- Sport: Athletics
- Event: Long jump
- Club: BBTE, Budapest

Henrik Koltai (born 11 May 1913, date of death unknown) was a Hungarian athlete who competed at the 1936 Summer Olympics.

== Biography ==
Koltai finished second behind Robert Paul in the long jump event at the 1935 AAA Championships.

At the 1936 Olympic Games in Berlin, he competed in the men's long jump.
