= Athletics Federation of Serbia =

Governing body for the sport of athletics in Serbia

Serbian Athletics Federation
- Sport: Athletics
- Abbreviation: ACC
- Founded: 1939
- Affiliation: European Athletic Association; World Athletics
- President: Slobodan Branković
- Secretary: Jovan Kantar
- Replaced: Athletics Federation of Serbia and Montenegro; Athletic Federation of Yugoslavia

Official website
- sas.rs
- (Serbia)

The Serbian Athletics Federation (Serbian: Српски атлетски савез; Srpski atletski savez) is the governing body for the sport of athletics in Serbia.

== Olympic Games ==
#	Athlete	Gold	Silver	Bronze	Total
1	Ivana Španović	0	0	1	1

== World Championships ==
included: IAAF: World outdoor championship, World indoor championship, World half marathon championship, World cross country championship, World race walking cup, IAU: 50 km World Championship, 100 km World Championship, 24 Hour World Championship

As of 20 Aug 2016

#	Athlete	Gold		Silver		Bronze		Total
#	Athlete	outdoor	indoor	outdoor	indoor	outdoor	indoor	Total
1	Ivana Španović	0	1	0	1	2	1	5
2	Emir Bekrić	0	0	0	0	1	0	1
3	Dragan Perić, Dragutin Topić	0	0	0	0	0	1	1
3	Svetislav Jovanović, Stevan Pavlović, Đorđe Stefanović	0	0	0	0	1*	0	1

* team cross country medals

== Continental Cup ==
#	Athlete	Gold	Silver	Bronze	Total
1	Ivana Španović	0	1	0	1

== European Championships ==
included: IAAF: European outdoor championship, European indoor championship, European cross country championship, European race walking cup, IAU: 100km European Championship, 24H European Championship

As of 5 Mar 2017

#	Athlete	Gold		Silver		Bronze		Total
#	Athlete	outdoor	indoor	outdoor	indoor	outdoor	indoor	Total
1	Ivana Španović	2	3	1	0	0	0	6
2	Dragutin Topić	1	1	0	0	0	2	4
3	Vera Nikolić	2	0	0	0	1	0	3
4	Asmir Kolašinac	0	1	0	1	1	0	3
5	Snežana Pajkić, Miloš Srejović	1	0	0	0	0	0	1
6	Slobodan Branković, Vladimir Milić, Dragan Zdravković	0	1	0	0	0	0	1
7	Nenad Stekić	0	0	2	1	0	0	3
8	Olga Gere	0	0	1	1	0	0	2
9	Olivera Jevtić	0	0	1	0	5	0	6
10	Emir Bekrić; Tatjana Jelača; Biljana Petrović; Armin Sinančević; Adriana Vilagoš	0	0	1	0	0	0	1
11	Jelisaveta Đanić, Gizela Farkaš, Dragan Perić	0	0	0	1	0	0	1
12	Mihail Dudaš	0	0	0	0	1	1	2
13	Angelina Topić	0	0	0	0	1	0	1
14	Adam Ladik, Jovan Lazarević, Ninoslava Tikvički	0	0	0	0	0	1	1

== European Cup Winter Throwing ==
previously European Winter Throwing Challenge

as of 2017

#	Athlete	Gold	Silver	Bronze	Total
1	Asmir Kolašinac	1	1	0	2
2	Dragana Tomašević	0	1	3	4

== European Team Championships ==
League	Gold	Silver	Bronze	Total
II	0	0	2	2
IIB	1	1	0	2
