= Francisc Nemeș =

Romanian sprinter

Personal information
- Nationality: Romanian
- Born: 17 January 1907 Carei, Austria-Hungary
- Died: 7 November 1991 (aged 84) Carei, Satu Mare County, Romania

Sport
- Sport: Sprinting
- Event: 400 metres

Francisc Nemeș (17 January 1907 – 7 November 1991) was a Romanian sprinter. He competed in the men's 400 metres at the 1936 Summer Olympics.
