= Bert Norris =

English long-distance runner

Personal information
- Nationality: British (English)
- Born: 5 November 1898 Hanover Square, London, England
- Died: 11 June 1990 (aged 91) Wincanton, Somerset, England

Sport
- Sport: Athletics
- Event: long-distance
- Club: Polytechnic Harriers
Medal record
Men's athletics
Representing England
British Empire Games
Silver medal – second place	1938 Sydney	Marathon

Albert James Norris (5 November 1898 – 11 June 1990) was an English long-distance runner who competed for Great Britain in the 1936 Summer Olympics.

== Biography ==
Norris born in Hanover Square, London, represented England at the 1934 British Empire Games in the marathon but failed to finish the competition. The following year he became the national marathon champion after winning the British AAA Championships title at the 1935 AAA Championships.

In 1936 he participated in the Olympic marathon event but did not finish the race. Two years later he won the silver medal in the marathon contest at the 1938 British Empire Games.

He was and died in Wincanton, Somerset.
