= Lyuben Gurgushinov =

Bulgarian triple jumper

Personal information
- Nationality: Bulgarian
- Born: 2 November 1931 (age 94)

Sport
- Sport: Athletics
- Event: Triple jump

Lyuben Gurgushinov (Bulgarian: Любен Гургушинов, born 2 November 1931) is a Bulgarian athlete. He competed in the men's triple jump at the 1964 Summer Olympics.
