= Ivan Krevs =

Yugoslav long-distance runner

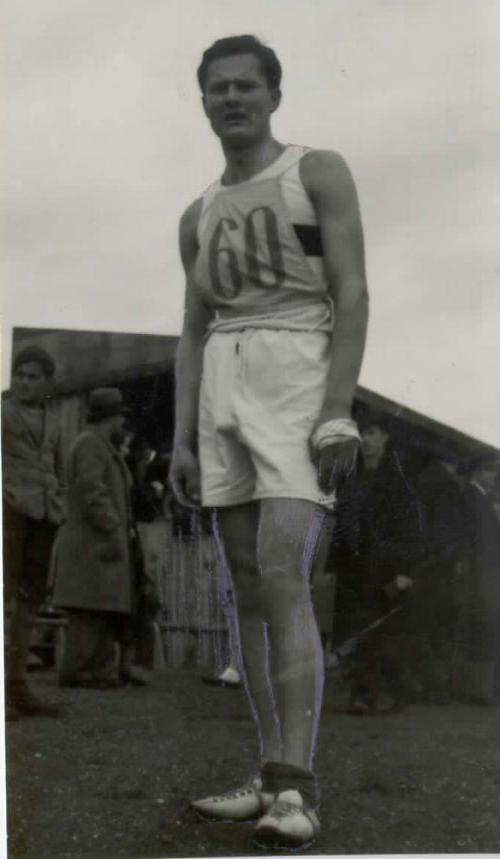
- Ivan Krevs

Personal information
- Nationality: Yugoslav
- Born: 21 November 1912
- Died: 24 October 1990 (aged 77)

Sport
- Sport: Long-distance running
- Event: 5000 metres

Ivan Krevs (21 November 1912 – 24 October 1990) was a Yugoslav long-distance runner. He competed in the men's 5000 metres at the 1936 Summer Olympics.
