= Emil Goršek =

Yugoslav middle-distance runner

Personal information
- Nationality: Yugoslav
- Born: 9 March 1914 Celje, Yugoslavia

Sport
- Sport: Middle-distance running
- Event: 800 metres

Emil Goršek (born 9 March 1914, date of death unknown) was a Yugoslav middle-distance runner. He competed in the men's 800 metres at the 1936 Summer Olympics.
