= Konstantinos Petridis =

Greek sprinter (born 1906)

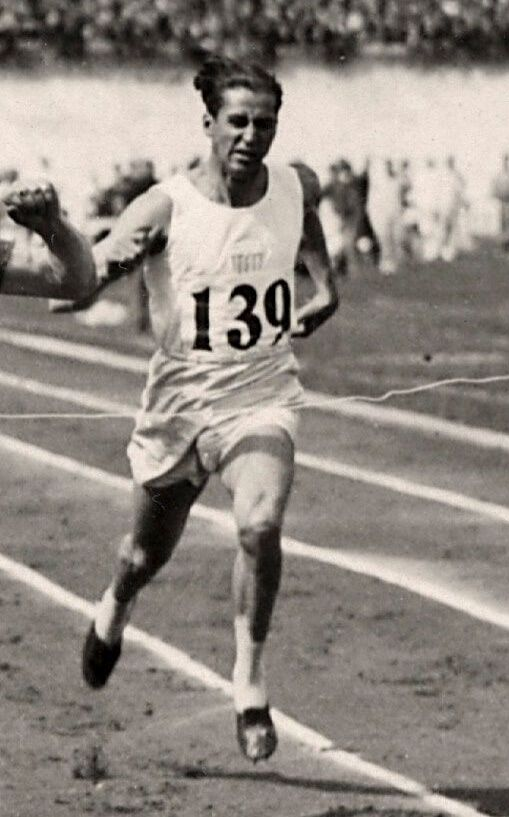
- Konstantinos Petridis in 1928

Personal information
- Nationality: Greek
- Born: 1906

Sport
- Sport: Sprinting
- Event: 100 metres

Konstantinos Petridis (born 1906, date of death unknown) was a Greek sprinter. He competed in the men's 100 metres at the 1928 Summer Olympics.
