= Rade Radovanović =

Yugoslav triple jumper 1928–2021

Radomir Radovanović
Personal information
- Nationality: Yugoslav
- Born: 20 December 1928 Podgorica, Yugoslavia
- Died: 11 July 2021 (aged 92) Belgrade, Serbia

Sport
- Sport: Athletics
- Event: Triple jump

Rade Radovanović (20 December 1928 – 11 July 2021) was a Yugoslav athlete. He competed in the men's triple jump at the 1952 Summer Olympics.
