= Iosif Naghi =

Romanian discus thrower

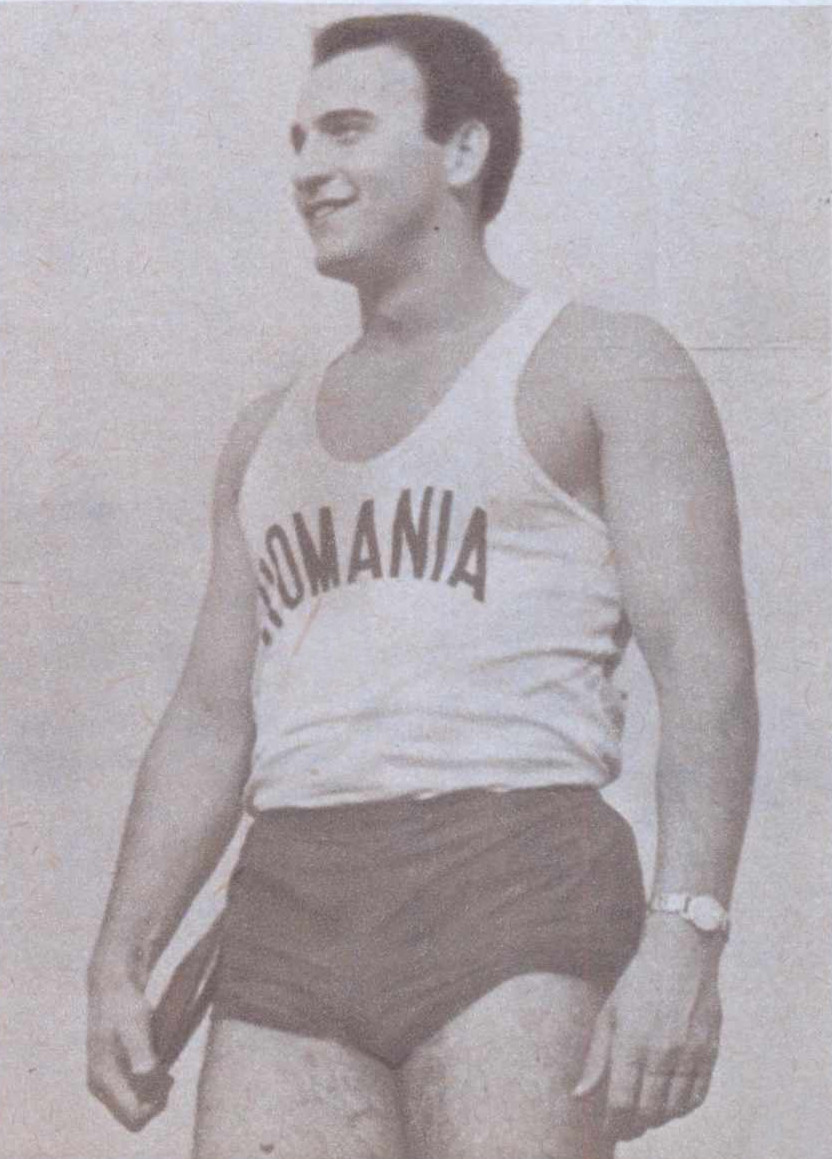

Personal information
- Nationality: Romanian
- Born: 20 November 1946 Târgu Mureș, Romania
- Died: 20 March 2018 (aged 71) Târgu Mureș, Romania

Sport
- Sport: Athletics
- Event: Discus throw

Iosif Naghi (20 November 1946 – 20 March 2018) was a Romanian athlete. He competed in the men's discus throw at the 1976 Summer Olympics and the 1980 Summer Olympics. He retired at the age of 38 years and died in his hometown Târgu Mureș on 20 March 2018 from a myocardial infarction.
