= Gheorghe Cefan =

Romanian middle-distance runner

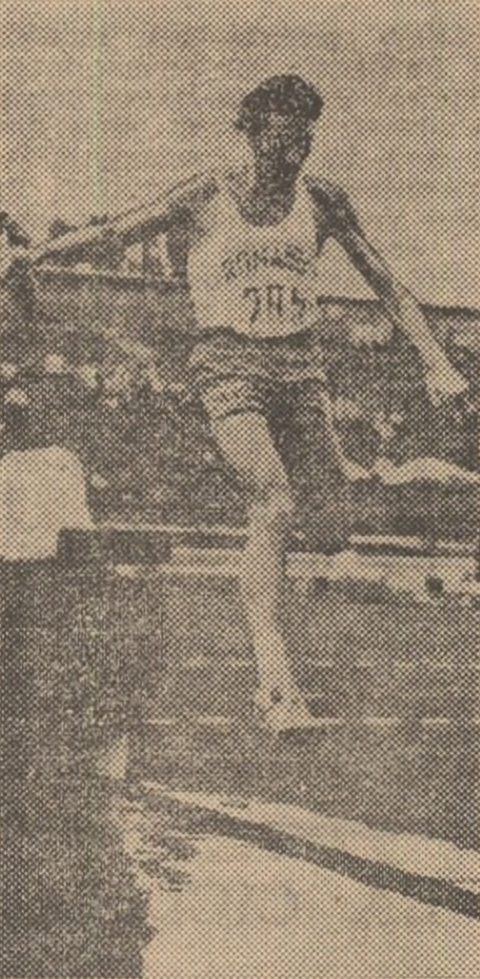
- Gheorghe Cefan in 1976

Personal information
- Nationality: Romanian
- Born: 6 March 1947 (age 79) Șiria, Romania

Sport
- Sport: Middle-distance running
- Event: Steeplechase

Gheorghe Cefan (born 6 March 1947) is a Romanian middle-distance runner. He competed in the 3000 metres steeplechase at the 1972 Summer Olympics and the 1976 Summer Olympics.
