= Alexandru Bizim =

Romanian javelin thrower

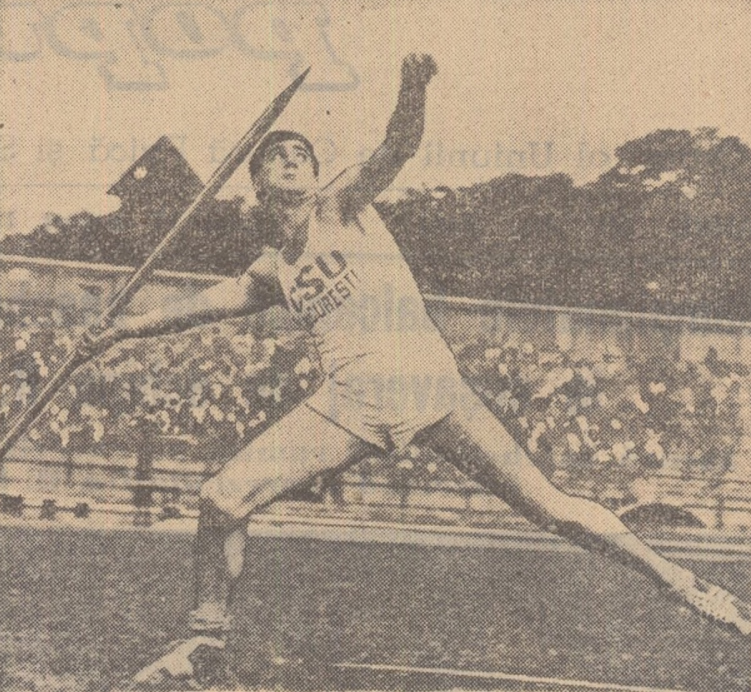
- Bizim in 1959

Personal information
- Nationality: Romanian
- Born: 15 July 1934 Bârlad, Romania
- Died: June 2016 (aged 82)
- Height: 192 cm (6 ft 4 in)
- Weight: 96 kg (212 lb)

Sport
- Country: Romania
- Sport: Track and field
- Event: Javelin throw

Achievements and titles
- Personal best: 81.21
Medal record
Representing Romania
Summer Universiade
Bronze medal – third place	1959 Turin	Javelin throw

Alexandru Bizim (15 July 1934 – June 2016) was a Romanian Olympic javelin thrower. He represented his country in the men's javelin throw at the 1960 Summer Olympics. His distance was a 68.92 in the qualifiers.
