= Dimitrios Kyteas =

Greek pole vaulter

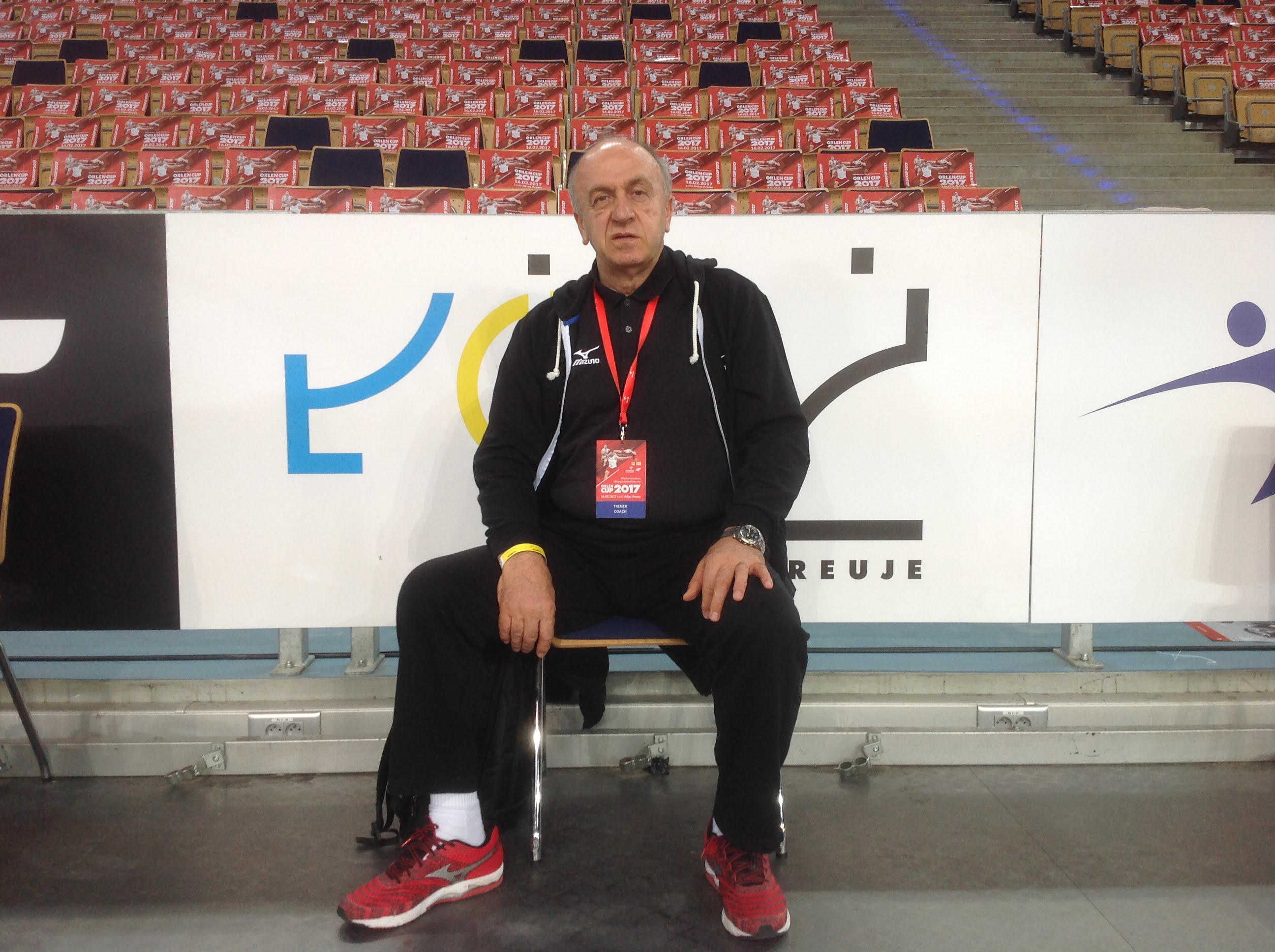
- Dimitrios Kyteas in 2017 (Lodz Poland)

Personal information
- Nationality: Greek
- Born: 21 November 1954 (age 71) Athens, Greece
- Education: Physical Education Professor specialized in Classic Sports
- Years active: 1970 - 1983 (Member of the National Track and Field Team)

Sport
- Country: Greek
- Event: Pole Vault
- Team: Panathinaikos A.C.
Medal record
U-18 National Championship
| Gold medal – first place | 1972 Athens | Pole Vault |
| Gold medal – first place | 1973 Athens | Pole Vault |
Men’s National Championship
| Gold medal – first place | 1976 Athens | Pole Vault |
| Gold medal – first place | 1980 Nicosia | Pole Vault |
| Gold medal – first place | 1981 Athens | Pole Vault |
| Gold medal – first place | 1982 Chania | Pole Vault |
U-18 Balkan Games
| Gold medal – first place | 1973 Bucharest | Pole Vault |
Men’s Balkan Games
| Gold medal – first place | 1975 Bucharest | Pole Vault |
| Gold medal – first place | 1976 Yugoslavia | Pole Vault |
| Bronze medal – third place | 1977 Ankara | Pole Vault |
| Bronze medal – third place | 1979 Athens | Pole Vault |
| Bronze medal – third place | 1981 Sarajevo | Pole Vault |
| Gold medal – first place | 1982 Bucharest | Pole Vault |
| Bronze medal – third place | 1983 Izmir | Pole Vault |
Universiade
| Silver medal – second place | 1978 Turin | Pole Vault |

Dimitrios Kyteas (Greek: Δημήτριος Κυτέας, born 21 November 1954) is a retired Physical Education Professor and active Federal Coach. For many years he was Greece National and Balkan Champion in Pole Vault. He participated in European Championships, International Meetings and in Montreal Olympic Games as athlete and in London and Rio de Janeiro as coach.

He attended the National and Kapodistrian University of Athens and became a Physical Education Professor. He is a Federal Coach of the Greek National Team in Pole Vault, working with athletes of various ages.

He is the first Junior in the Balkans clearing 5.00 m. and his personal best is 5.32m. Dimitirios Kyteas became an Olympian.

== Athletic career ==
Dimitrios Kyteas was an athlete in Panathinaikos Athletic Club.

He is the first Junior in the Balkans clearing 5.00 m. and his personal best is 5.32m since 1975. Dimitirios Kyteas became an Olympian with his participation in Montreal Olympic Games in 1976. His achievements are:

- National Youth Record (4.12m. – 1970)
- National and Balkan U-18 Record (4.92m. – 1972)
- National and Balkan U-18 Record (5.00m. – 1973)
- 1st place in National Games (4 times – 1976, 1980, 1981, 1982)
- 5th place in U-18 European Championships (Duisburg – 1973)
- 1st place in U-18 Balkan Games (Bucharest – 1973)
- 1st place in Balkan Games (Bucharest – 1975)
- 1st place in Balkan Games (Yugoslavia – 1976)
- 7th place in European Championships (Munich – 1976)
- Participation in Olympic Games (Montreal – 1976)
- 2nd place in Universiade (Turin – 1978)
- 1st place in Balkan Games (Bucharest – 1982)
- 3rd place in Balkan Games (Ankara – 1977)
- 3rd place in Balkan Games (Athens – 1979)
- 3rd place in Balkan Games (Sarajevo – 1981)
- 3rd place in Balkan Games (Izmir – 1983)
- Participation in Universiade (Sofia – 1977 /10th), (Mexico – 1979 /10th), (Bucharest – 1981 /9th)
- Participation in Mediterranean Games (Split – 1979 /4th), (Casablanca – 1983).

== Coaching ==
His best achievement and characteristic success was when his athlete Konstantinos Filippidis won the Gold Medal in World Indoor Championship in Ergo Arena 2014.
