= Christos Dimitropoulos =

Greek hammer thrower (born 1913)

Personal information
- Nationality: Greek
- Born: 1913 Korinthos, Kingdom of Greece

Sport
- Sport: Athletics
- Event: Hammer throw

Christos Dimitropoulos (born 1913, date of death unknown) was a Greek athlete. He competed in the men's hammer throw at the 1936 Summer Olympics.
