= Ðani Kovač =

Yugoslav sprinter (1939–2026)

Personal information
- Nationality: Yugoslav, Serbian
- Born: 13 February 1939 Perth, Western Australia, Australia
- Died: 22 January 2026 (aged 86) Ćuprija, Serbia

Sport
- Sport: Sprinting
- Event: 4 × 400 metres relay
- Club: AK Dinamo Zrinjevac (Zagreb); ASK Split; Partizan (Belgrade)

Ðani Kovač (13 February 1939 – 22 January 2026) was a Yugoslav, Croatian and Serbian sprinter. He competed in the men's 4 × 400 metres relay at the 1960 Summer Olympics where he reached the semi finals.

He was member of AK Dinamo Zrinjevac, ASK Split and Partizan athletic clubs.

Kovač died in Mijatovac, Ćuprija, Serbia on 22 January 2026, at the age of 86.
