= Todor Manolov =

Bulgarian hammer thrower

Personal information
- Nationality: Bulgarian
- Born: 3 August 1951 Varna, Bulgaria
- Died: 5 September 2014 (aged 63)

Sport
- Sport: Athletics
- Event: Hammer throw

Todor Manolov (3 August 1951 – 5 September 2014) was a Bulgarian athlete. He competed in the men's hammer throw at the 1972 Summer Olympics.
