= Stavros Velkopoulos =

Greek middle-distance runner

Personal information
- Nationality: Greek
- Born: 1910 Constantinople, Ottoman Empire
- Died: 30 June 1966 (aged 55–56)

Sport
- Sport: Middle-distance running
- Event: 800 metres

Stavros Velkopoulos (1910 – 30 June 1966) was a Greek middle-distance runner. He competed in the men's 800 metres at the 1936 Summer Olympics.
