= Napoleon Papageorgiou =

Greek javelin thrower

Personal information
- Nationality: Greek
- Born: 2 May 1908 Tripoli, Greece
- Died: 1991 (aged 82–83)

Sport
- Sport: Athletics
- Event: Javelin throw

Napoleon Papageorgiou (2 May 1908 – 1991) was a Greek athlete. He competed in the men's javelin throw at the 1936 Summer Olympics.
