= Leonida Caraiosifoglu =

Romanian racewalker

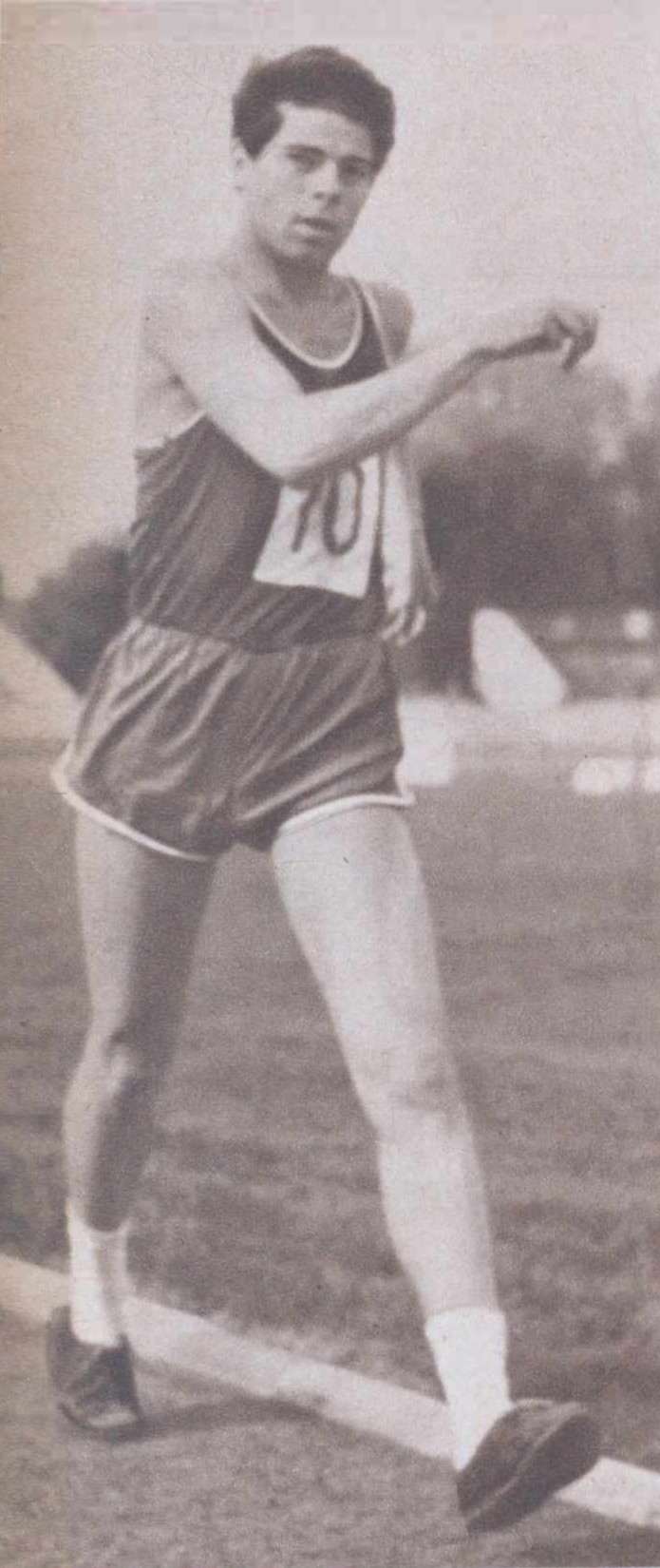
- Karaiosifoglu in 1966

Personal information
- Nationality: Romanian
- Born: 31 October 1944
- Died: 31 October 2024 (aged 80)

Sport
- Sport: Athletics
- Event: Racewalking
Medal record
Men's athletics
Representing Romania
European Championships
Silver medal – second place	1969 Athens	20 km walk

Leonida Caraiosifoglu (31 October 1944 – 31 October 2024) was a Romanian racewalker. He competed in the men's 20 kilometres walk at the 1968 Summer Olympics.
