= Mirko Vujačić =

Montenegrin athlete

Personal information
- Nationality: Montenegrin
- Born: 1 September 1924 Golubovci, Kingdom of Serbs, Croats, and Slovenes
- Died: 2 January 2016 (aged 91) Podgorica, Montenegro

Sport
- Sport: Athletics
- Event: Javelin throw

Mirko Vujačić (1 September 1924 – 2 January 2016) was a Montenegrin athlete. He competed in the men's javelin throw at the 1948 Summer Olympics, representing Yugoslavia.
