= Grigorios Georgakopoulos =

Greek middle-distance runner

Personal information
- Nationality: Greek
- Born: 1909
- Died: 1956 (aged 46–47)

Sport
- Sport: Middle-distance running
- Event: 800 metres

Grigorios Georgakopoulos (1909 – 1956) was a Greek middle-distance runner. He competed in the men's 800 metres at the 1936 Summer Olympics.
