= Dimos Manglaras =

Greek long jumper

Dimosthenis "Dimos" Magklaras (Greek: Δημοσθένης "Δήμος" Μαγκλάρας (in English also is spelled Manglaras); born 3 June 1940, in Katerini) is a former Greek long jumper. He died on 22 October 2024.

At the 1960 Summer Olympics in Rome he ranked 11th, and at the 1964 Summer Olympics in Tokyo he didn't pass the qualification.

His personal bests are 7.74 m outdoors (25 July 1964, in Cairo) and 7.24 m indoors (27 March 1966, in Dortmund).
