= Nikolaos Papanikolaou (athlete) =

Greek athlete

Personal information
- Nationality: Greek
- Born: 24 February 1911

Sport
- Sport: Athletics
- Event: Triple jump

Nikolaos Papanikolaou (born 24 February 1911, date of death unknown) was a Greek athlete. He competed in the men's triple jump at the 1932 Summer Olympics.
