= Atanas Andonov =

Bulgarian decathlete

Personal information
- Born: July 16, 1955 (age 70)

Sport
- Sport: Decathlon

Atanas Vasilev Andonov (Bulgarian: Атанас Василев Андонов; born July 16, 1955) is a retired male decathlete from Bulgaria. He set his personal best (8199 points) in 1981. Andonov is married to high jumper Lyudmila Andonova.

== Achievements ==
Year	Competition	Venue	Position	Notes
Representing Bulgaria
1980	Olympic Games	Moscow, Soviet Union	7th	7927 points
1982	European Championships	Athens, Greece	10th	7904 points
