= Christos Mantikas =

Greek sprinter (1902–1960)

Personal information
- Nationality: Greek
- Born: 1902 Chios, Greece
- Died: 6 June 1960 (aged 57–58) Athens, Greece

Sport
- Sport: Athletics
- Event(s): 400m Hurdles, 400 m
- Club: Paghiakos Gymnastikos Syllogos / AEK
Medal record
Men's athletics
Representing Greece
European Championships
| Bronze medal – third place | 1934 Turin | 400 m hurdles |

Christos Mantikas (1902 – 6 June 1960) was a Greek sprinter. He competed in the men's 400 metres, 100 metres hurdles, 440 metres hurdles and relay events at the 1932 Summer Olympics

He also competed in 400m Hurdles in the 1936 Summer Olympics where he finished 6th in the final.

From the 1935 AAA Championships to the 1939 AAA Championships, Mantikas medalled three times in the 440 yards hurdles event and once in the 120 yards hurdles event at the prestigious AAA Championships.
