= Angelos Lambrou =

Greek sprinter

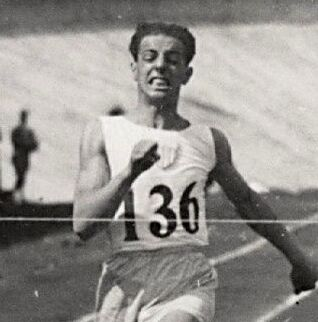
- Lambrou at the 1928 Olympics

Personal information
- Born: 4 June 1912 Athens, Greece
- Died: 12 December 1992 (aged 80)
- Height: 175 cm (5 ft 9 in)

Sport
- Sport: Athletics
- Event: Sprint
- Club: Ethnikos GS, Athens

Achievements and titles
- Personal best: 100 m – 10.9 (1934)

Angelos A. Lambrou (Αγγελος Λάμπρου, 4 June 1912 – 12 December 1992) was a Greek sprinter. He competed in the 100 m, 200 m and 4 × 100 m events at the 1928 and 1932 Summer Olympics, but failed to reach the finals.
