= Milan Stepišnik =

Slovenian hammer thrower

Personal information
- Nationality: Slovenian
- Born: 11 November 1910 Ljubljana, Cisleithania
- Died: 12 May 1948 (aged 37) Kočevje, Yugoslavia

Sport
- Sport: Athletics
- Event: Hammer throw

Milan Stepišnik (11 November 1910 – 18 November 1950) was a Yugoslav athlete. He competed in the men's hammer throw at the 1936 Summer Olympics, representing Yugoslavia.

During World War II, Stepisnik refused to make the Nazi salute in games; he was later imprisoned in Dachau, and following the Dachau trials he was sentenced to death by a firing squad.
