= Angeliki Pantazi =

Greek computer engineer

Angeliki Pantazi is a Greek researcher in neuromorphic computing and in applications of control theory to computer data storage systems, for IBM Research in Zurich.

== Education and career ==
Pantazi studied electrical engineering and computer technology at the University of Patras, where she earned a diploma in 1996 and a Ph.D. in 2005. She has been affiliated with IBM Research in Zurich since 2002, and became a permanent member of the research staff in 2006.

== Recognition ==
Pantazi is a Fellow of the International Federation of Automatic Control. She was named as an IBM Master Inventor in 2014.

She was part of a group of IBM researchers who in 2009 won both the Control Systems Technology Award and the Transactions on Control Systems Technology Outstanding Paper Award of the IEEE Control Systems Society, for their work on nanopositioning in microelectromechanical systems. She was the 2017 winner of the Control Systems Society Transition to Practice Award, for "the development of advanced control technologies for magnetic tape data storage and nanopositioning applications".
