= Andrei Barabaș =

Romanian middle-distance runner

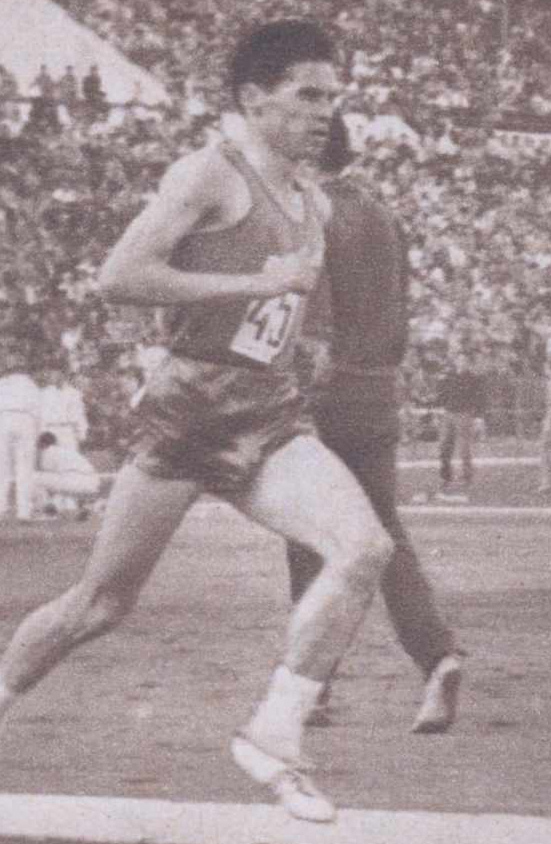
- Barabaș in 1963

Personal information
- Nationality: Romanian
- Born: 9 December 1937 Odorheiu Secuiesc, Romania
- Died: 2005 (aged 67–68)

Sport
- Sport: Middle-distance running
- Events: 1500 and 5000 metres
Medal record
Representing Romania
Summer Universiade
Silver medal – second place	1961 Sofia	5000m

Andrei Barabaș (9 December 1937 – 2005) was a Romanian middle-distance runner. He competed in the men's 1500 metres at the 1960 Summer Olympics and in the 5,000 and 10,000 meters at the 1964 Summer Olympics.
