= Zoltan Vamoș =

Romanian middle-distance runner

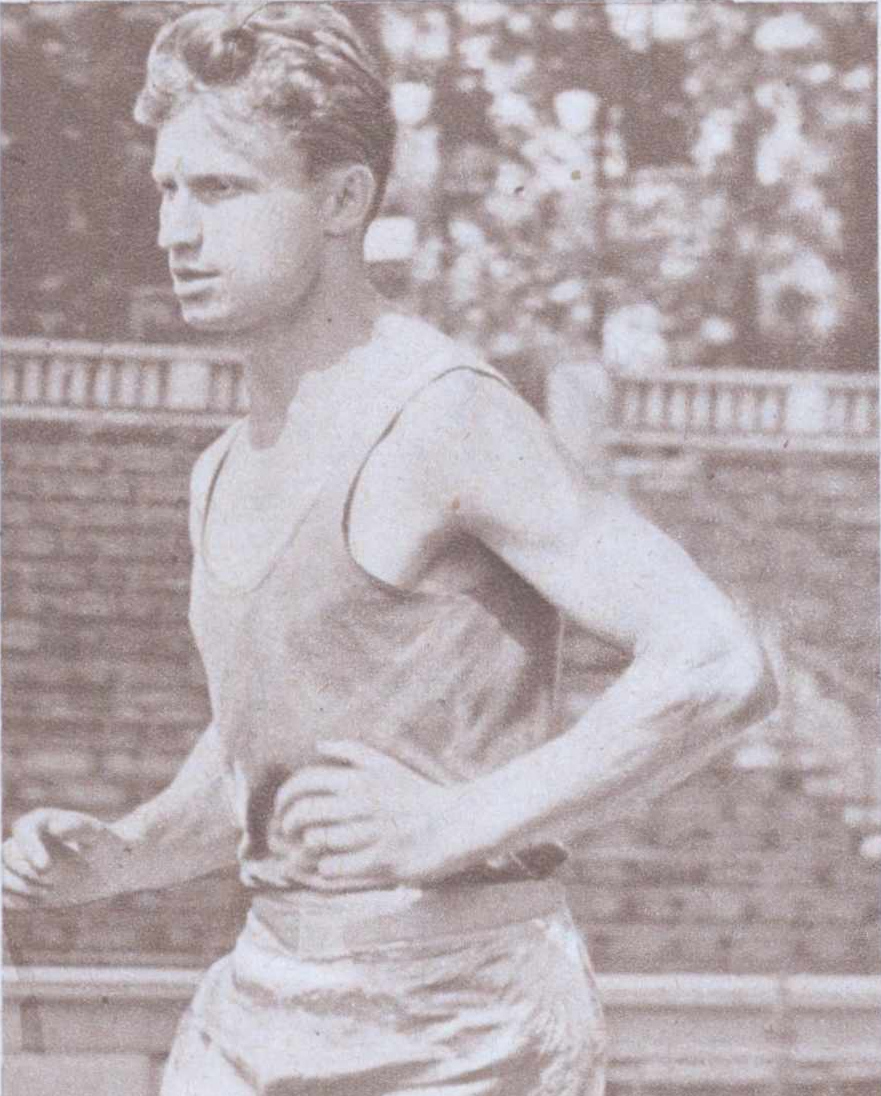
- Vamoș in 1962

Personal information
- Nationality: Romanian
- Born: 27 January 1936 Timișoara, Kingdom of Romania
- Died: 2001 (aged 64–65) Timișoara, Romania

Sport
- Sport: Middle-distance running
- Event: 1500 metres
Medal record
Men's athletics
Representing Romania
European Championships
Silver medal – second place	1962 Belgrade	3000 m steeplechase
Summer Universiade
Silver medal – second place	1961 Sofia	1500m

Zoltan Vamoș (27 January 1936 – 2001) was a Romanian middle-distance runner. He competed in the men's 1500 metres at the 1960 Summer Olympics.
