= Panagiotis Kharamis =

Greek long-distance runner

Personal information
- Nationality: Greek
- Born: 28 January 1971 (age 55)

Sport
- Sport: Long-distance running
- Event: Marathon

Panagiotis Kharamis (born 28 January 1971) is a Greek long-distance runner and Olympic athlete. He competed in the men's marathon at the 2000 Summer Olympics in Sydney.
