= Rennos Frangoudis =

Greek sprinter

Personal information
- Nationality: Greek
- Born: 27 February 1909 Limassol, Cyprus
- Died: 1 February 1982 (aged 72)

Sport
- Sport: Sprinting
- Event: 100 metres

Rennos Frangoudis (Greek: Ρένος Φραγκούδης, 27 February 1909 – 1 February 1982) was a Greek sprinter. He competed at the 1928, 1932 and the 1936 Summer Olympics.
