= Drago Štritof =

Personal information
- Full name: Dragutin "Drago" Štritof
- Nationality: Yugoslav
- Born: 1 August 1923
- Died: 2 November 2014 (aged 91)

Sport
- Sport: Middle-distance running
- Event: Steeplechase

Dragutin "Drago" Štritof (1 August 1923 – 2 November 2014) was a Croatian middle-distance runner who competed for Yugoslavia. He competed in the men's 3000 metres steeplechase at the 1952 Summer Olympics.
