= Đorđe Stefanović =

Personal information
- Born: 8 November 1921 Budapest, Hungary
- Died: 30 July 2012 (aged 90)

Sport
- Country: Yugoslavia
- Sport: Athletics
- Event: 3000 metres steeplechase

Đorđe Stefanović (also transliterated Djordje; 8 November 1921 – 30 July 2012) was an athlete who competed for Yugoslavia at the 1948 Summer Olympics in London, where he was eliminated in the opening round of the men's 3000 metres steeplechase. He was born in Budapest, Hungary and was a member of AK Partizan.
