= Nikolaos Syllas =

Greek discus thrower

Personal information
- Born: 30 November 1914 Chios, Voreio Aigaio, Greece
- Died: 16 August 1986 (aged 71) Chios, Voreio Aigaio, Greece

Sport
- Sport: Athletics
- Event: Discus
- Club: Panhiakos / Panionios Gymnastikos Syllogos

Nikolaos Syllas (Greek: Νικόλαος Σύλλας; 30 November 1914 – 16 August 1986) was a Greek athlete who competed in the 1936 Summer Olympics, in the 1948 Summer Olympics, and in the 1952 Summer Olympics. He was born in Chios. At the 1952 edition he was flag bearer for Greece.

Outside the Olympics he was a silver medallist at the 1951 Mediterranean Games behind Italy's Giuseppe Tosi (an Olympic medallist). He was also a three-time participant for Greece at the European Athletics Championships, competing 1934, 1946 and 1950.

Syllas won two prestigious AAA Championships discus throw titles at the 1937 AAA Championships and the 1939 AAA Championships before his career was interrupted by World War II.
