= Constantin Grecescu =

Romanian long-distance runner

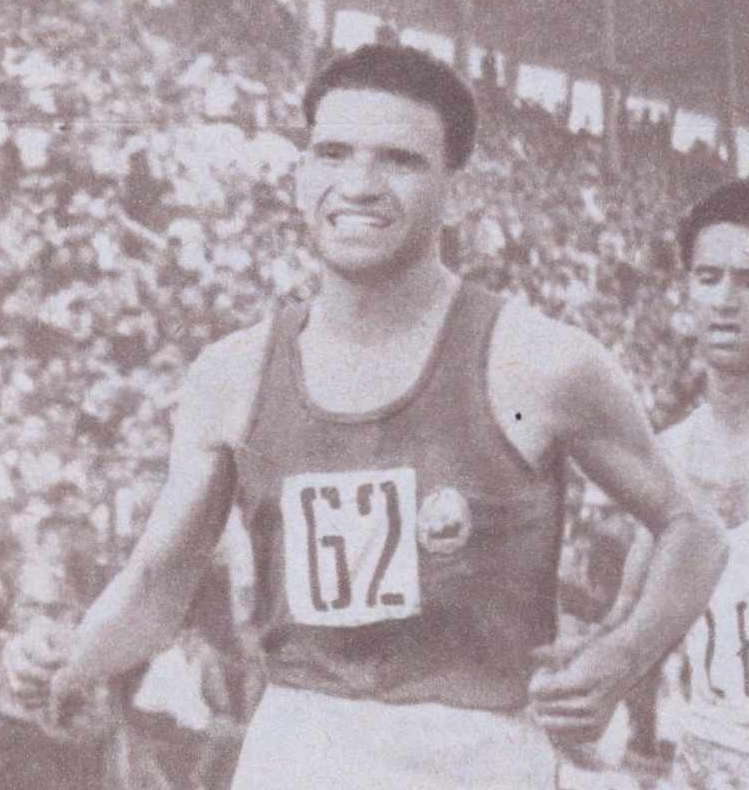
- Grecescu in 1963

Personal information
- Nationality: Romanian
- Born: 7 January 1929 Grecești, Romania
- Died: 1996 (aged 66–67)

Sport
- Sport: Long-distance running
- Event: Marathon

Constantin Grecescu (7 January 1929 – 1996) was a Romanian long-distance runner. He competed in the marathon at the 1964 Summer Olympics.
