= Konstantinos Pantazis =

Greek high jumper

Personal information
- Nationality: Greek
- Born: 1915 Athens, Kingdom of Greece

Sport
- Sport: Athletics
- Event: High jump

Konstantinos Pantazis (born 1915) was a Greek athlete. He competed in the men's high jump at the 1936 Summer Olympics.
