= 2011 European Team Championships =

International athletics competition

- Host city: Stockholm, Sweden (Super League)
- Nations: 47
- Events: 40
- Dates: 18–19 June 2011
- Main venue: Stockholm Olympic Stadium (Super League)

The third European Team Championships took place on 18 and 19 June 2011. The Competition was divided between four divisions, with results determining promotion and relegation between them. The Super League event was held in Stockholm, at the Stockholm Olympic Stadium. The Super League was won by the German team ahead of Russia, initial winner before several doping disqualifications, and Ukraine.

== Calendar ==
Division	Date	Host city	Host country
Super League	18–19 June 2011	Stockholm	Sweden
First League	18–19 June 2011	İzmir	Turkey
Second League	18–19 June 2011	Novi Sad	Serbia
Third League	18–19 June 2011	Reykjavík	Iceland

== Super League ==
- Place: Stockholm Olympic Stadium, Stockholm, Sweden

The men's pole vault competition was moved indoor to Sätrahallen because of bad weather conditions.

=== Participating countries ===
Belarus
Czech Republic
France
Germany
Great Britain
Italy

Poland
Portugal
Russia
Spain
Sweden
Ukraine

=== Men's events ===
Event	First		Second		Third	
100 m	Christophe Lemaitre; France	9.95; CR, EL, NR	Dwayne Chambers; Great Britain	10.07	Francis Obikwelu; Portugal	10.22
200 m	Christophe Lemaitre; France	20.28; CR	Kamil Kryński; Poland	20.83; SB	Aliaksandr Linnik; Belarus	20.90; SB
400 m	Maksim Dyldin; Russia	45.82; SB	Thomas Schneider; Germany	45.98	Marco Vistalli; Italy	45.99
800 m	Adam Kszczot; Poland	1:46.50	Jeff Lastennet; France	1:46.70	Gareth Warburton; Great Britain	1:46.95; SB
1500 m	Manuel Olmedo; Spain	3:38.63	Valentin Smirnov; Russia	3:38.89; PB	James Shane; Great Britain	3:39.21
3000 m	Juan Carlos Higuero; Spain	8:03.43	Yegor Nikolayev; Russia	8:03.80	Rui Silva; Portugal	8:03.88
5000 m	Jesús España; Spain	13:39.25; CR	Serhiy Lebid; Ukraine	13:39.75	Andy Vernon; Great Britain	13:40.15
3000 m steeplechase	Vincent Zouaoui-Dandrieux; France	8:30.85	Steffen Uliczka; Germany	8:31.01	Vadym Slobodenyuk; Ukraine	8:37.19
110 m hurdles	Andy Turner; Great Britain	13.42	Garfield Darien; France	13.64	Jackson Quiñónez; Spain	13.71; SB
400 m hurdles	Dai Greene; Great Britain	49.21; CR	Georg Fleischhauer; Germany	49.56; PB	Aleksandr Derevyagin; Russia	49.70
4 × 100 m	Great Britain; Christian Malcolm; Craig Pickering; James Ellington; Harry Aikines-Aryeetey	38.60; CR, EL	France; Teddy Tinmar; Christophe Lemaitre; Pierre-Alexis Pessonneaux; Ronald Pognon	38.71	Germany; Alex Schaf; Marius Broening; Tobias Unger; Alex-Platini Menga	38.92
4 × 400 m	Russia; Maksim Dyldin; Dmitry Buryak; Pavel Trenikhin; Denis Alekseyev	3:02.42; EL	France; Nicolas Fillon; Teddy Venel; Mamoudou Hanne; Mame-Ibra Anne	3:03.33	Germany; David Gollnow; Jonas Plass; Benjamin Jonas; Thomas Schneider	3:04.10
High jump	Dmytro Dem'yanyuk; Ukraine	2.35 =WL, CR, =EL, PB	Aleksey Dmitrik; Russia	2.31	Jaroslav Bába; Czech Republic; Raul Spank; Germany	2.28
Pole vault (indoor)	Maksym Mazuryk; Ukraine	5.72 =SB	Malte Mohr; Germany	5.72	Aleksandr Gripich; Russia	5.60 =SB
Long jump	Aleksandr Menkov; Russia	8.20; CR	Michel Tornéus; Sweden	8.19; PB	Chris Tomlinson; Great Britain	8.12
Triple jump	Fabrizio Schembri; Italy	16.95	Dzmitry Platnitski; Belarus	16.81	Viktor Kuznyetsov; Ukraine	16.79
Shot put	David Storl; Germany	20.81 =CR	Tomasz Majewski; Poland	20.51	Ivan Yushkov; Russia	19.49
Discus	Robert Harting; Germany	65.63	Frank Casañas; Spain	62.43	Piotr Małachowski; Poland	61.66
Hammer	Markus Esser; Germany	79.28; CR	Paweł Fajdek; Poland	76.98; PB	Oleksiy Sokyrskyy; Ukraine	76.96; PB
Javelin	Sergey Makarov; Russia	81.20	Gabriel Wallin; Sweden	80.88; PB	Matthias de Zordo; Germany	77.86
WR world record | AR area record | CR championship record | GR games record | NR national record | OR Olympic record | PB personal best | SB season best | WL world leading (in a given season)

=== Women's events ===
Event	First		Second		Third	
100 m	Véronique Mang; France	11.23; CR	Olesya Povh; Ukraine	11.28	Aleksandra Fedoriva; Russia	11.34
200 m	Mariya Ryemyen; Ukraine	23.10	Yuliya Chermoshanskaya; Russia	23.40	Cathleen Tschirch; Germany	23.45; SB
400 m	Antonina Yefremova; Ukraine	51.02; CR	Denisa Rosolová; Czech Republic	51.37	Shana Cox; Great Britain	51.49
800 m	Jennifer Meadows; Great Britain	1:59.47	Liliya Lobanova; Ukraine	2:00.18	Maryna Arzamasava; Belarus	2:00.62
1500 m	Charlene Thomas; Great Britain	4:06.85; SB	Anna Mishchenko; Ukraine	4:07.27	Nuria Fernández; Spain	4:07.82
3000 m	Nataliya Tobias; Ukraine	8:54.16; SB	Natalia Rodríguez; Spain	8:55.09	Lidia Chojecka; Poland	8:55.73
5000 m	Dolores Checa; Spain	15:16.89	Yelena Zadorozhnaya; Russia	15:28.65	Helen Clitheroe; Great Britain	15:33.03; PB
3000 m steeplechase	Gulnara Galkina; Russia	9:31.20	Sara Moreira; Portugal	9:35.11	Jana Sussman; Germany	9:43.28; PB
100 m hurdles	Tatyana Dektyareva; Russia	13.16; SB	Alina Talay; Belarus	13.19	Marzia Caravelli; Italy	13.21
400 m hurdles	Zuzana Hejnová; Czech Republic	53.87; CR, NR	Natalya Antyukh; Russia	54.52; SB	Perri Shakes-Drayton; Great Britain	55.06
4 × 100 m	Ukraine; Olesya Povh; Nataliya Pohrebnyak; Mariya Ryemyen; Hrystyna Stuy	42.86; CR, EL	Russia; Yekaterina Voronenkova; Aleksandra Fedoriva; Yulia Gushchina; Yuliya Chermoshanskaya	43.12	Germany; Johanna Kedzierski; Marion Wagner; Cathleen Tschirch; Leena Günther	43.37
4 × 400 m	Russia; Kseniya Vdovina; Kseniya Zadorina; Tatyana Firova; Lyudmila Litvinova	3:27.17; EL	Great Britain; Kelly Massey; Nicola Sanders; Lee McConnell; Perri Shakes-Drayton	3:27.21	Ukraine; Kseniya Karandyuk; Alina Lohvynenko; Yuliya Baraley; Antonina Yefremova	3:28.13
High jump	Emma Green; Sweden	1.89	Viktoriya Stoypina; Ukraine	1.89	Ruth Beitia; Spain	1.89
Pole vault	Anna Rogowska; Poland	4.75; WL, CR	Silke Spiegelburg; Germany	4.75 =WL, =CR	Jiřina Ptáčníková; Czech Republic	4.60; SB
Long jump	Darya Klishina; Russia	6.74	Carolina Klüft; Sweden	6.73; SB	Éloyse Lesueur; France	6.60
Triple jump	Olha Saladukha; Ukraine	14.85; CR	Simona La Mantia; Italy	14.29	Patricia Sarrapio; Spain	14.10 =PB
Shot put	Nadine Kleinert; Germany	17.81	Anna Avdeyeva; Russia	17.33	Chiara Rosa; Italy	17.18
Discus	Kateryna Karsak; Ukraine	63.35	Darya Pishchalnikova; Russia	61.09	Żaneta Glanc; Poland	59.29
Hammer	Betty Heidler; Germany	73.43	Tatyana Lysenko; Russia	71.44	Katerina Safránková; Czech Republic	69.39; PB
Javelin	Christina Obergföll; Germany	66.22; WL	Goldie Sayers; Great Britain	64.46; SB	Barbora Špotáková; Czech Republic	64.40
WR world record | AR area record | CR championship record | GR games record | NR national record | OR Olympic record | PB personal best | SB season best | WL world leading (in a given season)

== Score table ==
Event		BLR	CZE	FRA	GER	GBR	ITA	POL	POR	RUS	ESP	SWE	UKR
100 metres	M	4	1	12	5	11	8	9	10	6	7	2	3
100 metres	W	5	7	12	9	8	3	4	6	10	1	2	11
200 metres	M	10	9	12	2	7	8	11	3	5	4	6	1
200 metres	W	1	8	9	10	7	3	5	6	11	2	3	12
400 metres	M	3	1	8	11	6	10	9	2	12	5	7	4
400 metres	W	9	11	6	7	10	5	4	1	8	3	2	12
800 metres	M	8	1	11	5	10	9	12	2	4	3	6	7
800 metres	W	10	2	6	8	12	9	7	3	0	5	4	11
1500 metres	M	2	7	5	9	10	4	8	1	11	12	3	6
1500 metres	W	0	8	3	7	12	4	9	6	0	5	10	11
3000 metres	M	5	2	8	4	9	6	1	10	11	12	3	7
3000 metres	W	8	3	5	6	7	9	10	4	0	11	2	12
5000 metres	M	8	2	6	3	10	5	7	4	9	12	1	11
5000 metres	W	1	2	5	9	10	6	4	8	11	12	3	7
3000 metre steeplechase	M	4	2	12	11	5	8	7	6	0	9	3	10
3000 metre steeplechase	W	3	10	8	0	5	7	4	11	12	9	2	6
110/100 metre hurdles	M	6.5	3	11	4	12	5	9	2	6.5	10	8	1
110/100 metre hurdles	W	11	6	8	7	9	10	5	1	12	3	2	4
400 metre hurdles	M	2	7	3	11	12	6	4	9	10	5	1	8
400 metre hurdles	W	3	12	6	5	10	8	4	7	11	1	2	9
4 × 100 metres relay	M	3	6	11	10	12	0	9	7	8	5	4	0
4 × 100 metres relay	W	7	4	8	10	9	3	6	1	11	2	5	12
4 × 400 metres relay	M	2	1	11	10	4	8	9	3	12	6	5	7
4 × 400 metres relay	W	6	8	5	9	11	7	4	1	12	2	3	10
High jump	M	4	9.5	8	9.5	5	7	2	1	11	6	3	12
High jump	W	7	4.5	8	3	2	4.5	6	1	9	10	12	11
Pole vault	M	5	7	8	11	6	0	9	3.5	10	3.5	2	12
Pole vault	W	6	10	5	11	8	3.5	12	7	9	3.5	0	2
Long jump	M	1	5	7	9	10	3	2	6	12	8	11	4
Long jump	W	8	1	10	7	4	3	5	9	12	6	11	2
Triple jump	M	11	2	8	6	3	12	9	7	0	5	4	10
Triple jump	W	6	3	0	7	4	11	8	5	9	10	2	12
Shot put	M	10	5	7	12	2	3	0	9	10	6	4	8
Shot put	W	9	1	8	12	3	10	7	2	11	5	6	4
Discus throw	M	1	9	3	12	7	4	10	2	8	11	6	5
Discus throw	W	4	7	8	9	5	6	10	3	11	2	1	12
Hammer throw	M	9	4	7	12	2	8	11	0	6	5	3	10
Hammer throw	W	9	10	8	12	4	5	1	7	11	6	2	3
Javelin throw	M	4	9	3	10	5	7	6	2	12	8	11	0
Javelin throw	W	3	10	2	12	11	7	1	5	9	8	4	6
Country		BLR	CZE	FRA	GER	GBR	ITA	POL	POR	RUS	ESP	SWE	UKR
Total		203	223	290	336.5	293	243	269	182.5	353	251	164	296

=== Final standings ===
Pos	Country	Pts
1	Germany	339.5
2	Russia	298.5
3	Ukraine	297
4	France	295
5	Great Britain	287
6	Poland	275
7	Spain	252
8	Italy	249
9	Czech Republic	221
10	Belarus	209.5
11	Portugal	191.5
12	Sweden	172

Note: After the results of several athletes banned for doping were retroactively voided, points had to be reallocated, Russia losing its initial title. This resulted in the originally relegated Czech Republic being one place higher than Belarus.

== First League ==
- Place: İzmir, Turkey

=== Participating countries ===
Belgium
Croatia
Finland
Greece
Hungary
Ireland

Netherlands
Norway
Romania
Slovenia
Switzerland
Turkey

=== Men's events ===
Event	First		Second		Third	
100 m	Jaysuma Saidy Ndure; Norway	10.19	Patrick van Luijk; Netherlands	10.34	Cédric Nabe; Switzerland	10.40
200 m	Jaysuma Saidy Ndure; Norway	20.32	Jonathan Åstrand; Finland	20.50	Jonathan Borlée; Belgium	20.56
400 m	Kevin Borlée; Belgium	45.61	Marcell Deák-Nagy; Hungary	46.01	Serdar Tamac; Turkey	46.43 NR
800 m	Tamás Kazi; Hungary	1:50.76	Wouter de Boer; Netherlands	1:51.21	Žan Rudolf; Slovenia	1:51.37
1500 m	Kemal Koyuncu; Turkey	4:01.51	Andreas Dimitrakis; Greece	4:01.64	Thomas Solberg Eide; Norway	4:01.86
3000 m	Kemal Koyuncu; Turkey	8:10.69	Dennis Licht; Netherlands	8:10.95	Kim Ruell; Belgium	8:10.96
5000 m	Mert Girmalegesse; Turkey	14:00.97	Sondre Nordstad Moen; Norway	14:03.25	Philipp Bandi; Switzerland	14:05.50
3000 m steeplechase	Halil Akkas; Turkey	8:45.01	Jukka Keskisalo; Finland	8:45.73	Bjørnar Ustad Kristensen; Norway	8:46.70
110 m hurdles	Gregory Sedoc; Netherlands	13.39	Dániel Kiss; Hungary	13.46	Konstadinos Douvalidis; Greece	13.51
400 m hurdles	Periklis Iakovakis; Greece	50.26	Michael Bultheel; Belgium	50.37	Tibor Koroknai; Hungary	51.28
4 × 100 m	Switzerland; Cédric Nabe; Alex Wilson; Reto Schenkel; Pascal Mancini	39.20	Netherlands; Mike van Kruchten; Giovanni Codrington; Jerrel Feller; Patrick van Luijk	39.30	Ireland; Jason Smyth; Paul Hession; Chris Russell; Steven Colvert	39.61
4 × 400 m	Belgium; Arnaud Destatte; Antoine Gillet; Jonathan Borlée; Kévin Borlée	3:01.59	Turkey; Ali Ekber Kaya; Mehmet Güzel; Yavuz Can; Serdar Tamac	3:05.32	Greece; Dimitros Gravalos; Mihail Dardaneliotis; Sotirios Iakovakis; Periklis Iakovakis	3:06.30
High jump	Dimitrios Chondrokoukis; Greece	2.32	Rožle Prezelj; Slovenia	2.20	Mihai Donisan; Romania; Kouros Foroughi; Ireland; Osku Torro; Finland	2.15
Pole vault	Konstadinos Filippidis; Greece	5,40	Jansen Robbert; Netherlands	5,15	Andrej Poljanec; Slovenia	5,00
Long jump	Louis Tsatoumas; Greece	7.90	Roni Ollikainen; Finland	7.67	Nicolas Stempnick; Belgium	7.58
Triple jump	Marian Oprea; Romania	16,83	Stavros Yeoryiou; Greece	16,02	Sindre Almsengen; Norway	15,57
Shot put	Lajos Kürthy; Hungary	19.02	Mihail Stamatoyiannis; Greece	18.79	Marin Premeru; Croatia	18.64
Discus	Róbert Fazekas; Hungary	62,31	Mikko Kyyrö; Finland	62,09	Ercüment Olgundeniz; Turkey	61,98
Hammer	Krisztián Pars; Hungary	80.14	Eşref Apak; Turkey	74.20	Elvind Henriksen; Norway	73,35
Javelin	Ari Mannio; Finland	81,24	Fatih Avan; Turkey	77,31	Matija Kranjc; Slovenia	75,94
WR world record | AR area record | CR championship record | GR games record | NR national record | OR Olympic record | PB personal best | SB season best | WL world leading (in a given season)

=== Women's events ===
Event	First		Second		Third	
100 m	Ezinne Okparaebo; Norway	11.48	Andreea Ograzeanu; Romania	11.55	Dafne Schippers; Netherlands	11.57
200 m	Jamile Samuel; Netherlands	23.28	Sabina Veit; Slovenia	23.41	Ezinne Okparaebo; Norway	23.43
400 m	Bianca Răzor; Romania	52.56	Agni Derveni; Greece	53.13	Anita Banović; Croatia	53.17
800 m	Yeliz Kurt; Turkey	2:01.95	Yvonne Hak; Netherlands	2:02.33	Eleni Filandra; Greece	2:02.50
1500 m	Ingvill Makestad Bovim; Norway	4:25.92	Johanna Lehtinen; Finland	4:26.05	Sultan Haydar; Turkey	4:26.50
3000 m	Sultan Haydar; Turkey	9:11.60	Sabine Fischer; Switzerland	9:12.94	Sigrid Vanden Bempt; Belgium	9:13.54
5000 m	Fionnuala Britton; Ireland	15:37.78	Karoline Bjerkeli Grøvdal; Norway	15:44.92	Roxana Bârcă; Romania	16:02.20
3000 m steeplechase	Binnaz Uslu; Turkey	9:40.29	Karoline Bjerkeli Grøvdal; Norway	9:46.07	Cristina Casandra; Romania	9:50.73
100 m hurdles	Christina Vukicevic; Norway	12.87	Lisa Urech; Switzerland	12.90	Marina Tomić; Slovenia	13.10
400 m hurdles	Élodie Ouédraogo; Belgium	55.74	Stine Tomb; Norway	56.38	Birsen Engin; Turkey	56.50
4 × 100 m	Netherlands; Dafne Schippers; Anouk Hagne; Kadene Vassell; Jamile Samuel	43.90	Belgium; Justine Desondre; Hanna Mariën; Élodie Ouédraogo; Anne Zagré	44.49	Switzerland; Mujinga Kambundji; Jacqueline Gasser; Clelia Reuse; Léa Sprunger	44.50
4 × 400 m	Ireland; Joanne Cuddihy; Marian Heffernan; Claire Bergin; Michelle Carey	3:31.25	Romania; Adelina Pastor; Mihaela Nunu; Sanda Belgyan; Bianca Răzor	3:33.96	Belgium; Axelle Dauwens; Wendy Den Haeze; Hanna Mariën; Lindsy Cozijns	3:34.09
High jump	Ana Šimić; Croatia	1.92	Esthera Petre; Romania; Tonje Angelsen; Norway	1.89		
Pole vault	Nikolía Kiriakopoúlou; Greece	4.30	Nicole Büchler; Switzerland	4.15	Cathrine Larsåsen; Norway	4.15
Long jump	Viorica Țigău; Romania	6.50	Irene Pusterla; Switzerland	6.50	Nina Kolarič; Slovenia	6.40
Triple jump	Paraskevi Papahristou; Greece	14.09	Adelina Gavrilă; Romania	13.87	Snežana Rodić; Slovenia	13.56
Shot put	Melissa Boekelman; Netherlands	17.62	Anita Márton; Hungary	16.82	Nilgün Öztürk; Turkey	14.93
Discus	Nicoleta Grasu; Romania	60.85	Monique Jansen; Netherlands	57.87	Tanja Komulainen; Finland	55.06
Hammer	Bianca Perie; Romania	70.37	Merja Korpela; Finland	68.68	Alexandra Papageorgiou; Greece	64.13
Javelin	Martina Ratej; Slovenia	61.53	Sanni Utriainen; Finland	57.46	Savva Lika; Greece	57.02
WR world record | AR area record | CR championship record | GR games record | NR national record | OR Olympic record | PB personal best | SB season best | WL world leading (in a given season)

=== Score table ===
Event		BEL	CRO	FIN	GRE	HUN	IRL	NED	NOR	ROM	SLO	SUI	TUR
100 metres	M	6	4	1	2	3	9	11	12	7	8	10	5
100 metres	W	5	3	1	8	4	9	10	12	11	6	2	7
200 metres	M	10	1	11	7	2	8	9	12	4	3	6	5
200 metres	W	4	6	2	8	1	7	12	10	9	11	5	3
400 metres	M	12	7	5	8	11	6	9	1	3	2	4	10
400 metres	W	5	10	3	11	8	6	9	7	12	4	2	0
800 metres	M	7	1	8	6	12	4	11	5	9	10	3	2
800 metres	W	7	1	4	10	8	6	11	9	2	3	5	12
1500 metres	M	7	1	9	11	5	8	3	10	4	2	6	12
1500 metres	W	3	2	11	4	5	9	7	12	6	1	8	10
3000 metres	M	10	1	9	4	8	6	11	7	3	2	5	12
3000 metres	W	10	5	6	3	8	7	4	2	9	1	11	12
5000 metres	M	9	1	8	3	7	5	6	11	2	4	10	12
5000 metres	W	3	7	5	6	4	12	9	11	10	2	8	0
3000 metres steeplechase	M	7	3	11	2	8	5	4	10	9	0	6	12
3000 metres steeplechase	W	8	3	7	0	2	9	5	11	10	4	6	12
110/100 metres hurdles	M	9	8	6	10	11	1	12	2	4	3	7	5
110/100 metres hurdles	W	8	4	5	2	1	9	3	12	6	10	11	7
400 metres hurdles	M	11	1	6	12	10	9	8	3	7	2	5	4
400 metres hurdles	W	12	9	5	6	1	8	2	11	4	3	7	10
4 × 100 metres relay	M	4	2	9	5	8	10	11	7	3	0	12	6
4 × 100 metres relay	W	11	6	5	8	4	0	12	3	7	0	10	9
4 × 400 metres relay	M	12	3	2	10	9	8	7	1	5	6	4	11
4 × 400 metres relay	W	10	8	6	7	3	12	4	9	11	2	5	0
High jump	M	4.5	5.5	9	12	2	9	5.5	4.5	9	11	1	3
High jump	W	2	12	1	4	7	5.5	5.5	10.5	10.5	3	8	9
Pole vault	M	0	0	0	12	9	0	11	7	6	10	8	5
Pole vault	W	9	4.5	0	12	3	7	0	10	6	8	11	4.5
Long jump	M	10	8	11	12	6	2	3	7	5	1	9	4
Long jump	W	2	1	3	5	7	4	6	8	12	10	11	9
Triple jump	M	3	8	0	11	6	4	2	10	12	7	9	5
Triple jump	W	1	3	6	12	7	2	8	5	11	10	4	9
Shot put	M	4	10	7	11	12	3	0	5	6	8	2	9
Shot put	W	4	2	7	8	11	6	12	3	1	5	9	10
Discus throw	M	4	9	11	6	12	2	7	5	8	3	1	10
Discus throw	W	2	4	10	8	9	3	11	7	12	1	6	5
Hammer throw	M	1	6	8	7	12	2	4	10	3	9	5	11
Hammer throw	W	1	7	11	10	9	2	3	5	12	8	4	6
Javelin throw	M	4	3	12	9	6	1	8	2	5	10	7	11
Javelin throw	W	7	1	11	10	8	2	5	4	9	12	3	6
Country		BEL	CRO	FIN	GRE	HUN	IRL	NED	NOR	ROM	SLO	SUI	TUR
Total		248.5	182	251	303	269	227	282	292	282	205	256	294.5

=== Final standings ===
Pos	Country	Pts
1	Greece	303
2	Turkey	294.5
3	Norway	292
4	Romania	282
5	Netherlands	282
6	Hungary	269
7	Switzerland	256
8	Finland	251
9	Belgium	248.5
10	Ireland	227
11	Slovenia	205
12	Croatia	182

== Second League ==
- Place: Novi Sad, Serbia

=== Participating countries ===
Austria
Bulgaria
Denmark
Estonia

Latvia
Lithuania
Serbia
Slovakia

=== Men's events ===
Event	First		Second		Third	
100 m	Rytis Sakalauskas; Lithuania	10.34	Elvijs Misāns; Latvia	10.51	Petar Kremenski; Bulgaria	10.50
200 m	Marek Niit; Estonia	20.75	Petar Kremenski; Bulgaria	21.07	Martynas Jurgilas; Lithuania	21.16
400 m	Krasimir Braikov; Bulgaria	46.36	Marek Niit; Estonia	46.50	Nick Ekelund-Arenander; Denmark	47.34
800 m	Andreas Vojta; Austria	1:50.29	Andreas Bube; Denmark	1:50.37	Vitalij Kozlov; Lithuania	1:50.74
1500 m	Goran Nava; Serbia	3:44.49	Morten Toft Munkholm; Denmark	3:45.47	Jozef Pelikán; Slovakia	3:45.85
3000 m	Tiidrek Nurme; Estonia	8:22.81	Andreas Bueno; Denmark	8:22.99	Mirko Petrović; Serbia	8:23.77
5000 m	Jakob Hannibal; Denmark	14:25.94	Mirko Petrović; Serbia	14:27.83	Sergei Terepannikov; Estonia	14:32.23
3000 m steeplechase	Kaur Kivistik; Estonia	8:56.84	Justinas Beržanskis; Lithuania	8:57.46	Mitko Tsenov; Bulgaria	9:01.52
110 m hurdles	Viliam Papšo; Slovakia	14.16	Mantas Šilkauskas; Lithuania	14.17	Andreas Martinsen; Denmark	14.31
400 m hurdles	Emir Bekrić; Serbia	50.35	Rasmus Mägi; Estonia	51.17	Lazar Katuchev; Bulgaria	51.95
4 × 100 m	Denmark; Andreas Trajkovski; Jesper Simonsen; Mike Kalisz; Morten Jensen	39.71 NR	Estonia; Rasmus Rooks; Richard Pulst; Markus Ellisaar; Marek Niit	40.23	Austria; Benjamin Grill; Ekemini Bassey; Dominik Distelberger; Bernhard Chudarek	40.23
4 × 400 m	Estonia; Kristjan Kangur; Marek Niit; Rivar Tipp; Rasmus Mägi	3:08.16 NR	Denmark; Jacob Riis; Andreas Bube; Nicklas Hyde; Nick Ekelund-Arenander	3:09.27	Bulgaria; Georgi Kirillov Georgiev; Radoslav Stefanov; Petar Kremenski; Krasimir Braikov	3:10.67
High jump	Viktor Ninov; Bulgaria	2.28; PB	Raivydas Stanys; Lithuania	2.18	Karl Lumi; Estonia	2.14
Pole vault	Mareks Ārents; Latvia	5.30 =PB	Spas Bukhalov; Bulgaria	5.15	Veiko Kriisk; Estonia	4.92
Long jump	Povilas Mykolaitis; Lithuania	8.03	Morten Jensen; Denmark	8.01	Nikolay Atanasov; Bulgaria	7.71
Triple jump	Anders Møller; Denmark	16.15	Igor Sjunin; Estonia	16.04	Mantas Dilys; Lithuania	15.95
Shot put	Māris Urtāns; Latvia	20.31	Asmir Kolašinac; Serbia	20.09	Kim Christensen; Denmark	18.79
Discus	Märt Israel; Estonia	62.91	Aleksas Abromavičius; Lithuania	59.91	Gerhard Mayer; Austria	59.90
Hammer	Libor Charfreitag; Slovakia	77.69	Ainārs Vaičulēns; Latvia	70.99	Torben Wolf; Denmark	62.48
Javelin	Risto Mätas; Estonia	79.55	Kolio Neshev; Bulgaria	72.13	Ansis Brūns; Latvia	71.73
WR world record | AR area record | CR championship record | GR games record | NR national record | OR Olympic record | PB personal best | SB season best | WL world leading (in a given season)

=== Women's events ===
Event	First		Second		Third	
100 m	Ivet Lalova; Bulgaria	11.20	Lina Grinčikaitė; Lithuania	11.58	Grit Šadeiko; Estonia	11.81
200 m	Ivet Lalova; Bulgaria	23.71	Anna Olsson; Denmark	24.87	Doris Roser; Austria	25.02
400 m	Vania Stambolova; Bulgaria	50.98	Maris Mägi; Estonia	52.51	Agnė Orlauskaitė; Lithuania	53.31
800 m	Lucia Klocová; Slovakia	2:02.24	Eglė Balčiūnaitė; Lithuania	2:02.83	Teodora Kolarova; Bulgaria	2:03.58
1500 m	Marina Muncan; Serbia	4:19.28	Jennifer Wenth; Austria	4:22.49	Agatha Strausa; Latvia	4:24.49
3000 m	Jennifer Wenth; Austria	9:31.57	Daniela Yordanova; Bulgaria	9:38.49	Laura Suur; Estonia	9:40.54
5000 m	Ana Subotić; Serbia	16:32.61	Jekaterina Patjuk; Estonia	16:33.33	Silvia Danekov; Bulgaria	16:36.79
3000 m steeplechase	Jekaterina Patjuk; Estonia	10:04.15	Ana Subotić; Serbia	10:15.18	Silvia Danekova; Bulgaria	10:21.59
100 m hurdles	Sonata Tamošaitytė; Lithuania	13.17	Beate Schrott; Austria	13.32	Grit Šadeiko; Estonia	13.63
400 m hurdles	Vania Stambolova; Bulgaria	53.70	Sara Petersen; Denmark	57.52	Mila Andrić; Serbia	59.47
4 × 100 m	Bulgaria	44.59	Lithuania	44.67	Austria	45.52
4 × 400 m	Bulgaria	3:37.10	Estonia	3:40.62	Lithuania	3:40.74
High jump	Venelina Veneva-Mateeva; Bulgaria	1.91	Airinė Palšytė; Lithuania	1.89	Natllija Cakova; Latvia	1.86
Pole vault	Caroline Bonde Holm; Denmark	4.20	Jelena Radinovic-Savic; Serbia	4.05	Daniela Hoolwarth; Austria	4.00
Long jump	Ivana Spanovic; Serbia	6.58	Lauma Grīva; Latvia	6.42	Renata Medgyesova; Slovakia	6.27
Triple jump	Dana Velďáková; Slovakia	13.89	Andriana Banova; Bulgaria	13.81	Veera Baranova; Estonia	13.64
Shot put	Austra Skujytė; Lithuania	16.39	Radoslava Mavrodieva; Bulgaria	16.25	Linda Treiel; Estonia	14.95
Discus	Dragana Tomašević; Serbia	60.57	Eha Rünne; Estonia	48.91	Ivona Tomanová; Slovakia	47.46
Hammer	Martina Hrašnová; Slovakia	68.09	Julia Siart; Austria	56.92	Sara Savatović; Serbia	54.96
Javelin	Madara Palameika; Latvia	63.46	Indrė Jakubaitytė; Lithuania	58.86	Elisabeth Eberl; Austria	52.90
WR world record | AR area record | CR championship record | GR games record | NR national record | OR Olympic record | PB personal best | SB season best | WL world leading (in a given season)

=== Score table ===
Event		AUT	BUL	DEN	EST	LAT	LTU	SRB	SVK
100 metres	M	2	6	4	1	7	8	5	3
100 metres	W	5	8	3	6	2	7	4	1
200 metres	M	4	7	2	8	5	6	1	3
200 metres	W	6	8	7	2	4	5	1	3
400 metres	M	3	8	6	7	5	4	2	1
400 metres	W	3	8	1	7	2	6	4	5
800 metres	M	8	1	7	4	3	6	5	2
800 metres	W	5	6	1	2	3	7	4	8
1500 metres	M	4	1	5	7	2	3	8	6
1500 metres	W	7	3	1	4	6	2	8	5
3000 metres	M	5	4	7	8	3	1	6	2
3000 metres	W	8	7	3	6	4	5	2	1
5000 metres	M	4	3	8	6	5	2	7	1
5000 metres	W	2	6	5	7	3	4	8	1
3000 metres steeplechase	M	5	6	3	8	2	7	4	1
3000 metres steeplechase	W	4	6	5	8	3	2	7	1
110/100 metres hurdles	M	4	5	6	1	2	7	3	8
110/100 metres hurdles	W	7	2	1	6	5	8	4	3
400 metres hurdles	M	4	6	5	7	3	2	8	1
400 metres hurdles	W	5	8	7	4	3	1	6	2
4 × 100 metres relay	M	6	4	8	7	1	5	3	2
4 × 100 metres relay	W	6	8	1	4	2	7	3	5
4 × 400 metres relay	M	4	6	7	8	2	3	5	1
4 × 400 metres relay	W	4	8	3	7	1	6	5	2
High jump	M	1	8	2	6	3	7	4	5
High jump	W	4	8	1	5	6	7	3	2
Pole vault	M	2	7	5.5	5.5	8	0	3.5	3.5
Pole vault	W	6	4.5	8	4.5	1	2	7	3
Long jump	M	5	6	7	4	3	8	2	1
Long jump	W	1	2	4	3	7	5	8	6
Triple jump	M	2	5	8	7	4	6	3	1
Triple jump	W	3	7	1	6	2	4	5	8
Shot put	M	2	1	6	4	8	3	7	5
Shot put	W	2	7	4	6	1	8	5	3
Discus throw	M	6	5	1	8	2	7	4	3
Discus throw	W	4	3	5	7	2	0	8	6
Hammer throw	M	4	6	5	3	7	2	1	8
Hammer throw	W	7	3	5	4	1	2	6	8
Javelin throw	M	2	7	6	8	6	3	4	1
Javelin throw	W	6	2	1	4	8	7	5	3
Country		AUT	BUL	DEN	EST	LAT	LTU	SRB	SVK
Total		172	215.5	175	218	147	185	188.5	134.5

=== Final standings ===
Pos	Country	Pts
1	Estonia	218
2	Bulgaria	215.5
3	Serbia	188.5
4	Lithuania	185
5	Denmark	175
6	Austria	172
7	Latvia	147
8	Slovakia	134.5

== Third League ==
- Place: Reykjavík, Iceland

=== Participating countries ===
Athletic Association of Small States of Europe
(Gibraltar, Liechtenstein, Monaco, San Marino)
Albania
Andorra
Armenia
Azerbaijan
Bosnia and Herzegovina
Cyprus

Georgia
Iceland
Israel
Luxembourg
Macedonia
Malta
Moldova
Montenegro

=== Men's events ===
Event	First		Second		Third	
100 m	Ruslan Abbasov; Azerbaijan	10.22w	Dmitriy Glushchenko; Israel	10.48w	Panayiotis Ioannou; Cyprus	10.52w
200 m	Ruslan Abbasov; Azerbaijan	20.99	Dmitriy Glushchenko; Israel	21.17	Anthos Christofides; Cyprus	21.70
400 m	Hakim Ibrahimov; Azerbaijan	47.76	Endrik Zilbershtein; Georgia	47.81	Andrei Daranuță; Moldova	48.82
800 m	Dustin Emrani; Israel	1:50.84	Dušan Babić; Bosnia and Herzegovina	1:51.15	Anar Yusifov; Azerbaijan	1:51.53
1500 m	Ion Luchianov; Moldova	3:50.39	Christos Dimitriou; Cyprus	3:50.62	Getahon Yemar; Israel	3:51.18
3000 m	Amine Khadiri; Cyprus	8:19.68	Pol Mellina; Luxembourg	8:20.16	Kári Steinn Karlsson; Iceland	8:21.17
5000 m	Moges Tesseme; Israel	14:05.55	Tilahun Aliyev; Azerbaijan	14:23.43	Kári Steinn Karlsson; Iceland	14:29.49
3000 m steeplechase	Ion Luchianov; Moldova	8:54.70	Noam Ne'eman; Israel	9:09.22	Ashot Hayrapetyan; Armenia	9:10.03
110 m hurdles	Rahib Məmmədov; Azerbaijan	14.20	Claude Godart; Luxembourg	14.30	Adnan Malkić; Bosnia and Herzegovina	14.55
400 m hurdles	Alexei Cravcenko; Moldova	51.86	Ibrahim Ahmadov; Azerbaijan	52.30	Minas Alozidis; Cyprus	52.53
4 × 100 m	Azerbaijan; Rahib Məmmədov; Vugar Mehdiyev; Ruslan Abbasov; Valentin Bulichev	40.91	Israel; Micky Bar-Yeoshua; Dmitriy Glushchenko; Asaf Malka; Ram Mor	40.94	Cyprus; Kyriakos Antoniou; Anthos Kristofides; Panayiotis Ioannou; Vasilios Polycarpou	41.37
4 × 400 m	Azerbaijan; Arif Abbasov; Ibrahim Akhmedov; Valentin Bulichev; Hakim Ibrahimov	3:13.71	Israel; Yuriy Bichman; German Florentz; Yuriy Shapsai; Dustin Emrani	3:16.30	Bosnia and Herzegovina; Saša Kecman; Amel Tuka; Dušan Babić; Ilija Cvijetić	3:17.16
High jump	Dmitriy Kroyter; Israel	2.18	Radu Tucan; Moldova	2.18	Zurab Gogochuri; Georgia	2.05
Pole vault	Yevgeniy Olhovskiy; Israel	5.05	Nikandros Stylianou; Cyprus	5.00	Bjarki Gíslason; Iceland	4.80
Long jump	Vardan Pahlevanyan; Armenia	7.90w	Kristinn Torfason; Iceland	7.78w	Alexandru Cuharenco; Moldova	7.52
Triple jump	Vladimir Letnicov; Moldova	16.07	Yochai Halevi; Israel	16.05	Zacharias Arnos; Cyprus	15.79
Shot put	Ivan Emilianov; Moldova	19.41	Kemal Mešić; Bosnia and Herzegovina	19.25	Ódinn Björn Thorsteinsson; Iceland	18.75
Discus	Apostolos Parellis; Cyprus	58.27	Vadim Hranovschi; Moldova	56.62	Danijel Furtula; Montenegro	53.97
Hammer	Dmitriy Marshin; Azerbaijan	71.10	Roman Rozna; Moldova	70.18	Bergur Ingi Pétursson; Iceland	66.79
Javelin	Antoine Wagner; Luxembourg	71.69	Melik Janoyan; Armenia	70.41	Dejan Mileusnić; Bosnia and Herzegovina	69.71
WR world record | AR area record | CR championship record | GR games record | NR national record | OR Olympic record | PB personal best | SB season best | WL world leading (in a given season)

=== Women's events ===
Event	First		Second		Third	
100 m	Ramona Papaioannou; Cyprus	11.88	Olga Lenskiy; Israel	11.96	Diane Borg; Malta	11.99
200 m	Olga Lenskiy; Israel	24.26	Ramona Papaioannou; Cyprus	24.48	Diane Borg; Malta	24.74
400 m	Amalia Sharoyan; Armenia	54.98	Olesea Cojuhari; Moldova	55.81	Fjóla Signý Hannesdóttir; Iceland	57.52
800 m	Elena Popescu; Moldova	2:10.09	Meropi Panagiotou; Cyprus	2:11.61	Selma Zrnic; Bosnia and Herzegovina	2:12.07
1500 m	Luiza Gega; Albania	4:19.50	Meropi Panagiotou; Cyprus	4:30.30	Biljana Cvijanović; Bosnia and Herzegovina	4:33.71
3000 m	Sladjana Perunović; Montenegro	9:34.24	Lucia Kimani; Bosnia and Herzegovina	9:37.85	Natalia Cercheș; Moldova	9:38.86
5000 m	Gezashign Šafářová; Azerbaijan	16:14.92	Sladjana Perunović; Montenegro	16:25.91	Lucia Kamani; Bosnia and Herzegovina	16:51.15
3000 m steeplechase	Gezashign Šafářová; Azerbaijan	10:01.49	Luiza Gega; Albania	10:02.88	Biljana Cvijanović; Bosnia and Herzegovina	10:23.03 NR
100 m hurdles	Dimitra Arachoviti; Cyprus	13.77	Gorana Cvijetić; Bosnia and Herzegovina	14.47	Amaliya Sharoyan; Armenia	14.61
400 m hurdles	Amaliya Sharoyan; Armenia	1:00.40	Olga Dor-Dogadko; Israel	1:00.97	Anna Berghii; Moldova	1:01.99
4 × 100 m	Israel; Rotem Battat-Golan; Irina Lenskiy; Olga Lenskiy; Rita Pogorelov	46.37	Iceland; Hrafnhild Eid Hermodsdóttir; Hafdís Sigurdardóttir; Dóróthea Jóhannesdóttir; Dóra Hlín Loftsdóttir	46.86	Malta; Charlene Attard; Diane Borg; Rebecca Camilleri; Francesca Xuereb	46.96
4 × 400 m	Moldova; Anna Berghii; Alina Bordea; Olesea Cojuhari; Elena Popescu	3:48.08	Iceland; Hafdís Sigurdardóttir; Stefanía Valdimardóttir; Björg Gunnarsdóttir; Fjóla Signý Hannesdóttir	3:48.81	Armenia; Gayane Bulghadaryan; Anna Telesheva; Amaliya Sharoyan; Lusine Karayan	3:49.26 NR
High jump	Danielle Frenkel; Israel	1.84	Marija Vuković; Montenegro	1.81	Leontia Kallenou; Cyprus	1.78
Pole vault	Jillian Schwartz; Israel	4.10	Gina Reuland; Luxembourg	3.75	Ecaterina Abramova; Moldova	3.45 =NR
Long jump	Rotem Battat; Israel	6.11	Hafdís Sigurðardóttir; Iceland	5.99	Nektaria Panayi; Cyprus	5.83
Triple jump	Tatiana Cicanci; Moldova	12.98	Haykanush Beklaryan; Armenia	12.83	Eleftheria Christofi; Cyprus	12.48
Shot put	Anastasia Metskeyev; Israel	14.86	Florentia Kappa; Cyprus	13.87	Helga Margrét Þorsteinsdóttir; Iceland	13.69
Discus	Natalia Artic; Moldova	51.21	Zacharoula Georgiadou; Cyprus	47.96	Anastasia Metskeyev; Israel	47.31
Hammer	Marina Marghieva; Moldova	67.41	Paraskevi Theodorou; Cyprus	60.55	Pasa Sehić; Bosnia and Herzegovina	56.74
Javelin	Ásdís Hjálmsdóttir; Iceland	55.18	Alexandra Tsisiou; Cyprus	50.69	Kristine Harutyunyan; Armenia	48.02 NR
WR world record | AR area record | CR championship record | GR games record | NR national record | OR Olympic record | PB personal best | SB season best | WL world leading (in a given season)

=== Score table ===
Event		AAS	ALB	AND	ARM	AZE	BIH	CYP	GEO	ISL	ISR	LUX	MKD	MLT	MDA	MNE
100 metres	M	5	3	2	9	15	11	13	6	8	14	1	7	4	12	10
100 metres	W	9	7	2	8	6	10	15	–	11	14	5	12	13	4	3
200 metres	M	2	3	4	5	15	6	13	12	9	14	1	10	7	11	8
200 metres	W	7	0	3	9	5	8	14	–	12	15	6	10	13	11	4
400 metres	M	2	3	1	10	15	7	12	14	11	8	6	9	5	13	4
400 metres	W	9	–	4	15	7	12	6	–	13	11	5	8	10	14	3
800 metres	M	3	–	4	8	13	14	11	–	12	15	10	7	6	9	5
800 metres	W	–	–	5	11	8	13	14	–	9	12	10	4	7	15	6
1500 metres	M	3	7	5	11	12	10	14	–	8	13	9	2	6	15	4
1500 metres	W	–	15	6	9	7	13	14	–	4	11	12	5	10	–	8
3000 metres	M	4	–	11	10	12	7	15	–	13	9	14	3	6	8	5
3000 metres	W	5	–	3	8	12	14	10	–	7	11	6	4	9	13	15
5000 metres	M	6	–	12	11	14	9	8	–	13	15	10	3	5	7	4
5000 metres	W	6	–	4	7	15	13	10	–	8	12	9	5	11	–	14
3000 metres steeplechase	M	–	–	11	13	10	9	7	–	8	14	12	5	4	15	6
3000 metres steeplechase	W	–	14	–	–	15	13	10	–	9	11	7	5	6	12	8
110/100 metres hurdles	M	7	–	5	8	15	13	11	–	3	12	14	6	4	9	10
110/100 metres hurdles	W	9	–	5	13	4	14	15	11	12	0	10	6	–	7	8
400 metres hurdles	M	7	–	6	10	15	11	14	–	13	12	0	8	5	0	9
400 metres hurdles	W	–	–	5	15	8	10	9	–	11	14	12	6	–	13	7
4 × 100 metres relay	M	7	0	6	0	15	0	13	–	0	14	8	10	11	12	9
4 × 100 metres relay	W	4	–	3	11	8	9	12	–	14	15	7	6	13	10	5
4 × 400 metres relay	M	3	7	2	6	15	13	11	–	10	14	9	4	8	12	5
4 × 400 metres relay	W	–	–	5	13	7	11	9	–	14	12	10	6	8	15	0
High jump	M	8	–	3	0	11	6	10	13	7	15	12	9	4	14	5
High jump	W	7	–	6	4	3	12	13	–	8	15	11	10	9	5	14
Pole vault	M	10	–	9	–	0	–	14	–	13	15	11	–	8	12	7
Pole vault	W	12	–	8	–	11	–	0	–	10	15	14	–	9	13	–
Long jump	M	7	0	0	15	10	6	11	12	14	9	3	4	8	13	5
Long jump	W	7	3	1	12	6	8	13	9	14	15	4	2	11	10	5
Triple jump	M	7	10	1	5	12	6	13	11	9	14	4	8	3	15	2
Triple jump	W	–	–	4	14	7	11	13	–	8	12	9	10	6	15	5
Shot put	M	1	9	2	6	5	14	11	12	13	7	10	4	3	15	8
Shot put	W	3	–	2	9	5	11	14	10	13	15	8	4	6	12	7
Discus throw	M	3	–	2	7	4	12	15	9	10	11	8	6	5	14	13
Discus throw	W	3	–	2	9	10	12	14	11	8	13	5	4	6	–	7
Hammer throw	M	1	12	6	4	15	8	11	10	13	9	7	2	3	14	5
Hammer throw	W	3	–	6	9	4	13	14	0	11	12	10	5	8	15	7
Javelin throw	M	2	–	4	14	6	13	10	3	12	11	15	8	5	9	7
Javelin throw	W	6	–	4	13	0	8	14	–	15	10	11	7	5	12	9
Country		AAS	ALB	AND	ARM	AZE	BIH	CYP	GEO	ISL	ISR	LUX	MKD	MLT	MDA	MNE
Total		178	93	174	341	377	390	469	144	411	490	335	233	270	440	266

=== Final standings ===
Pos	Country	Pts
1	Israel	490
2	Cyprus	469
3	Moldova	440
4	Iceland	411
5	Bosnia and Herzegovina	390
6	Azerbaijan	377
7	Armenia	341
8	Luxembourg	335
9	Malta	270
10	Montenegro	266
11	Macedonia	233
12	AASSE	178
13	Andorra	174
14	Georgia	144
15	Albania	93
