= 2017 European 10,000m Cup =

- Organisers: EAA
- Edition: 21st
- Date: June 10
- Host city: Minsk, Belarus
- Venue: RCOP Stadium
- Events: 2
- Participation: 73 athletes from 26 nations
- Official website: en.minsk2017.org

The 2017 European 10,000m Cup took place on June 10, 2017. The races were held on RCOP Stadium in Minsk, Belarus.

== Medallists ==
Event	Gold		Silver		Bronze	
Individual
Men's	Antonio Abadía; Spain	28:31.16	Juan Pérez; Spain	28:35.69	Carlos Mayo; Spain	28:48.41
Women's	Sara Moreira; Portugal	32:03.57	Volha Mazuronak; Belarus	32:13.73	Esma Aydemir; Turkey	32:41.03
Team
Men's	Spain	1:25:55.26	Italy	1:27:35.99	Ukraine	1:29:03.26
Women's	Belarus	1:37:57.33	Portugal	1:39:42.84	Ukraine	1:41:25.0

== Race results ==
=== Men's ===
Individual race
Rank	Heat	Athlete	Country	Time	Note
1st place, gold medalist(s)	A	Antonio Abadía	Spain	28:31.16	SB
2nd place, silver medalist(s)	A	Juan Pérez	Spain	28:35.69	SB
3rd place, bronze medalist(s)	A	Carlos Mayo	Spain	28:48.41	PB
4	A	Aras Kaya	Turkey	29:03.13	SB
5	A	Stefano La Rosa	Italy	29:08.05	
6	A	Ahmed El Mazoury	Italy	29:09.93	
7	A	Marco Najibe Salami	Italy	29:18.01	PB
8	B	Alexandru Nicolae Soare	Romania	29:18.33	PB
9	A	Dmytro Lashyn	Ukraine	29:21.36	
10	A	Roman Romanenko	Ukraine	29:21.43	
11	A	Uladsilau Pramau	Belarus	29:30.45	
12	A	Eyob Faniel	Italy	29:50.24	
13	B	Samuele Dini	Italy	29:55.29	
14	B	Stsiapan Rahautsou	Belarus	30:00.95	
15	A	Matthew Leach	Great Britain	30:02.36	
16	B	Lorenzo Dini	Italy	30:02.94	
17	A	Graham Rush	Great Britain	30:03.97	
18	B	Sezgin Ataç	Turkey	30:04.02	PB
19	B	Andreas Kempf	Switzerland	30:10.86	PB
20	A	Daniel Sanz	Spain	30:11.84	
21	B	Artem Kazban	Ukraine	30:20.47	
22	B	Yann Schrub	France	30:30.43	
23	B	Rok Puhar	Slovenia	30:33.69	PB
24	B	Yehor Zhukov	Ukraine	30:40.88	
25	B	Jānis Višķers	Latvia	30:42.14	PB
26	B	Jiří Homoláč	Czech Republic	30:50.51	SB
27	B	Siarhei Platonau	Belarus	30:59.25	
28	B	Ramazan Özdemir	Turkey	31:09.22	PB
29	A	Mohamed Zarhouni	Spain	31:26.66	
30	A	Félix Bour	France	31:41.95	
	A	Kristian Jones	Great Britain	DNF	
	A	Bruno Albuquerque	Portugal	DNF	
	A	Olivier Irabaruta	Burundi	DNF	Pace
	A	Haymanot Alewe	Ethiopia	DNF	Pace
	B	Ivan Popov	Bulgaria	DNF	

Teams
Rank	Team	Time
1st place, gold medalist(s)	Spain: Antonio Abadía / 28:31.16; Juan Pérez / 28:35.69; Carlos Mayo / 28:48.41; (Daniel Sanz) / (30:11.84); (Mohamed Zarhouni) / (31:26.66)	1:25:55.26
2nd place, silver medalist(s)	Italy: Stefano La Rosa / 29:08.05; Ahmed El Mazoury / 29:09.93; Marco Najibe Salami / 29:18.01; (Eyob Faniel) / (29:50.24); (Samuele Dini) / (29:55.29); (Lorenzo Dini) / (30:02.94)	1:27:35.99
3rd place, bronze medalist(s)	Ukraine: Dmytro Lashyn / 29:21.36; Roman Romanenko / 29:21.43; Artem Kazban / 30:20.47; (Yehor Zhukov) / (30:40.88)	1:29:03.26
4	Turkey: Aras Kaya / 29:03.13; Sezgin Ataç / 30:04.02; Ramazan Özdemir / 31:09.22	1:30:16.37
5	Belarus: Uladsilau Pramau / 29:30.45; Stsiapan Rahautsou / 30:00.95; Siarhei Platonau / 30:59.25	1:30:30.64

- Note: Athletes in parentheses did not score for the team result.

=== Women's ===
Individual race
Rank	Heat	Athlete	Country	Time	Note
1st place, gold medalist(s)	A	Sara Moreira	Portugal	32:03.57	SB
2nd place, silver medalist(s)	A	Volha Mazuronak	Belarus	32:13.73	PB
3rd place, bronze medalist(s)	A	Esma Aydemir	Turkey	32:41.03	PB
4	A	Sabrina Mockenhaupt	Germany	32:46.37	SB
5	A	Sviatlana Kudzelich	Belarus	32:48.62	SB
6	A	Nastassia Ivanova	Belarus	32:54.98	PB
7	A	Carla Salomé Rocha	Portugal	33:10.43	
8	B	Yuliya Shmatenko	Ukraine	33:11.13	PB
9	A	Lonah Chemtai Salpeter	Israel	33:20.16	
10	B	Olha Kotovska	Ukraine	33:34.49	SB
11	B	Isabel Mattuzzi	Italy	33:43.00	PB
12	A	Nina Savina	Belarus	33:43.52	
13	B	Roxana Bârcă	Romania	33:46.65	PB
14	A	Büşra Nur Koku	Turkey	33:48.37	
15	A	Katrina Wootton	Great Britain	33:49.74	
16	B	Martina Tresch	Switzerland	34:03.59	
17	A	Claire Duck	Great Britain	34:08.72	
18	B	Marta Esteban	Spain	34:10.42	PB
19	A	Lyudmila Lyakhovich	Belarus	34:15.28	
20	A	Katarzyna Rutkowska	Poland	34:19.03	
21	B	Irene Pelayo	Spain	34:20.45	
22	A	Daniela Cunha	Portugal	34:28.84	
23	A	Louise Small	Great Britain	34:29.54	
24	B	Andreea Alina Piscu	Romania	34:39.29	SB
25	B	Olena Serdyuk	Ukraine	34:39.38	
26	B	Susana Godinho	Portugal	34:42.65	
27	B	Paula Todoran	Romania	34:48.85	SB
28	B	Raquel Gómez	Spain	34:53.10	
29	B	Liliana Dragomir	Romania	34:54.22	PB
30	A	Viktoriya Kalyuzhna	Ukraine	34:57.41	
31	B	Tatsiana Stsefanenka	Belarus	34:58.07	
32	A	Monica Madalina Florea	Romania	34:58.52	SB
33	B	Vaida Žūsinaitė	Lithuania	35:45.22	PB
34	B	Moira Stewartová	Czech Republic	35:58.89	
35	B	Emine Hatun Tuna	Turkey	36:10.24	SB
36	B	Fadime Suna	Turkey	36:17.11	
	A	Rosaria Console	Italy	DNF	
	A	Inês Monteiro	Portugal	DNF	
	A	Bezunesh Getachew	Ethiopia	DNF	Pace
	B	Fatna Maraoui	Italy	DNF	
	B	Sonja Roman	Slovenia	DNF	

Teams
Rank	Team	Time
1st place, gold medalist(s)	Belarus: Volha Mazuronak / 32:13.73; Sviatlana Kudzelich / 32:48.62; Nastassia Ivanova / 32:54.98; (Nina Savina) / (33:43.52); (Lyudmila Lyakhovich) / (34:15.28); (Tatsiana Stsefanenka) / (34:58.07)	1:37:57.33
2nd place, silver medalist(s)	Portugal: Sara Moreira / 32:03.57; Carla Salomé Rocha / 33:10.43; Daniela Cunha / 34:28.84; (Susana Godinho) / (34:42.65); (Inês Monteiro) / (DNF)	1:39:42.84
3rd place, bronze medalist(s)	Ukraine: Yuliya Shmatenko / 33:11.13; Olha Kotovska / 33:34.49; Olena Serdyuk / 34:39.38; (Viktoriya Kalyuzhna) / (34:57.41)	1:41:25.0
4	Great Britain: Katrina Wootton / 33:49.74; Claire Duck / 34:08.72; Louise Small / 34:29.54	1:42:28.0
5	Turkey: Esma Aydemir / 32:41.03; Büşra Nur Koku / 33:48.37; Emine Hatun Tuna / 36:10.24; (Fadime Suna) / (36:17.11)	1:42:39.64
6	Romania: Roxana Bârcă / 33:46.65; Andreea Alina Piscu / 34:39.29; Paula Todoran / 34:48.85; (Liliana Dragomir) / (34:54.22); (Monica Madalina Florea) / (34:58.52)	1:43:14.79
7	Spain: Marta Esteban / 34:10.42; Irene Pelayo / 34:20.45; Raquel Gómez / 34:53.10	1:43:23.97

- Note: Athletes in parentheses did not score for the team result.

== Medal table ==
The host country is highlighted in lavender blue

Rank	Nation	Gold	Silver	Bronze	Total
1	Spain	2	1	1	4
2	Belarus*	1	1	0	2
2	Portugal	1	1	0	2
4	Italy	0	1	0	1
5	Ukraine	0	0	2	2
6	Turkey	0	0	1	1
Totals (6 entries)		4	4	4	12

- Note: Totals include both individual and team medals, with medals in the team competition counting as one medal.
