= Sarajevo Half Marathon =

Annual road race in Sarajevo, Bosnia

- Date: September
- Location: Sarajevo, Bosnia and Herzegovina
- Event type: Road
- Distance: Half marathon
- Primary sponsor: Sberbank
- Established: 2007
- Course records: Men's: 1:05:28 (2011) (Serbia) Darko Živanović; Women's: 1:09:40 (2009) (Serbia) Olivera Jevtić
- Website: Sarajevo Half Marathon
- Participants: 400 finish (2009); 518 finishers (2021)

The Sarajevo Marathon non-governmental organization (NGO), created in 2007, organizes a half marathon annually, usually at the end of September, in Sarajevo, Bosnia and Herzegovina. The organisation hopes to run the race as a full marathon in the near future. NGO Sarajevo Marathon aims to raise awareness about running culture and the benefits of a dynamic and healthy lifestyle.

== History ==
NGO Sarajevo Marathon was created in 2007 to organize a marathon in Sarajevo, the capital of Bosnia and Herzegovina. The goal of the marathon is to improve people's physical and mental health and to promote the country. The NGO has successfully contributed to improving image of the country as well as of Sarajevo and is raising awareness about running as part of a healthy lifestyle.

Most of the members of NGO Sarajevo Marathon are from Bosnia and Herzegovina and are experienced athletes who run more than 3,500 kilometres (2,200 mi) each per year.

NGO Sarajevo Marathon organizes three races per year, which are intended as a tool to progressively create the first marathon in Bosnia and Herzegovina. They also have the more general aims of improving the well-being of society as a whole through promoting a healthy and dynamic lifestyle, volunteering, and raising ecological awareness. In 2009, about 300 people from three youth structures worked for the half marathon. The races help improve the tourism sector; in 2009, 300 hotel nights were booked in Sarajevo.

== Activities ==
The running culture in Bosnia and Herzegovina is still fairly small. Since 2009, the NGO has been organizing three races every year: Run to Europe, Run to the Hills, and The Sarajevo Half Marathon (which includes a 3 km fun run). By offering a range of events, the group attempts to reach a large part of the population by enabling people to run in at least one of the races, or more according to their physical abilities. Each race offers an opportunity to discover a beautiful part of Sarajevo and its surroundings.

The Sarajevo half marathon was one of the most important international sport events in the city in 2009. It was a successful experience by all indicators, according to comments and opinions of runners, other race managers, sponsors and partners. The association's core team has been widened since 2010 with permanent representatives in Rome and in Stockholm.

=== The Sarajevo Half Marathon ===
The Sarajevo Half Marathon is a 21.6 kilometres (13.4 mi) fast and flat street race, going through the most beautiful part of the city. It starts in front of the Olympic Hall Zetra. There are refreshment stations every 4 km and medical service are provided. The organizers offer T-shirts, medals, and a new route each year in order to create interest and to ensure good participation. Nearly 900 runners from 30 countries took part in the 2010 event.

=== Run to Europe ===
Run to Europe is a 4 kilometres (2.5 mi) fast and flat street race, taking place in Sarajevo. It starts and finishes in front of the buildings of Bosnia and Herzegovina (BiH) institutions. The event is organized in cooperation with both The Delegation of the EU Union in BiH and The Directorate for European Integration of BiH to mark Europe day (BiH is a potential candidate country for EU accession). More than 400 runners took part in the 2010 event.

=== Run to the Hills ===
Run to the Hills is a 10 kilometres (6.2 mi) trail race organized on Mont Igman, one of Sarajevo's Olympic sites. The hilly and challenging route combined with beautiful green scenery make the race unforgettable. The race mark the annual World Environment Day. More than 150 runners took part in the 2010 event and most European countries were represented.

== Past winners ==
The winners of the Sarajevo Half Marathon have been:

Edition	Date	Time (h:m:s)	Men's winner	Time (h:m:s)	Women's winner
14	19 Sep 2021	1:08:30	Stanley Kipruto (KEN)	1:17:38	Olivera Jevtić (SRB)
13	15 Sep 2019	1:07:46	Osman Junuzovič (BIH)	1:17:38	Olivera Jevtić (SRB)
12	16 Sep 2018	1:07:14	Stanley Kipruto (KEN)	1:14:46	Olivera Jevtić (SRB)
11	17 Sep 2017	1:12:07	Tamás Nagy (HUN)	1:32:38	Lucia Kimani (BIH)
10	18 Sep 2016	1:09:36	Barnabás Bene (HUN)	1:19:00	Slađana Perunović (MNE)
9	20 Sep 2015	1:06:38	Tamás Nagy (HUN)	1:14:30	Olivera Jevtić (SRB)
8	21 Sep 2014	1:07:49	Stanley Kipruto (KEN)	1:15:48	Olivera Jevtić (SRB)
7	15 Sep 2013	1:07:10	Tamás Nagy (HUN)	1:15:28	Biljana Cvjanović (BIH)
6	16 Sep 2012	1:09:13	Đuro Kodžo (BIH)	1:16:25	Biljana Cvjanović (BIH)
5	18 Sep 2011	1:05:28	Darko Živanović (SRB)	1:12:22	Ana Subotić (SRB)
4	19 Sep 2010	1:06:46	László Tóth (HUN)	1:16:48	Ana Subotić (SRB)
3	27 Sep 2009	1:06:45	Đuro Kodžo (BIH)	1:09:40	Olivera Jevtić (SRB)
2	21 Sep 2008	1:07:27	Đuro Kodžo (BIH)	1:14:44	Lucia Kimani (BIH)
1	22 Sep 2007	1:11:37	Đuro Kodžo (BIH)	1:14:14	Lucia Kimani (BIH)

== Sponsors and partners ==
- Olimpija (prirodna izvorska voda)
- Intesa SanPaolo Banka
- Ecoton
- Violeta
- AurA
- Sarajevo Graduate School of Business
- Raiffeisen Bank
- Toyota
- Grad Sarajevo
- BBI Centar
- Lafuma
- SportSport.ba
- Eufor
- x-sarajevo-x.com
