= 2011 European Athletics U23 Championships – Men's 5000 metres =

The Men's 5000 metres event at the 2011 European Athletics U23 Championships was held in Ostrava, Czech Republic, at Městský stadion on 16 July.

== Medalists ==
Gold	Sindre Buraas; Norway
Silver	Ross Millington; United Kingdom
Bronze	Jesper van der Wielen; Netherlands

== Results ==
=== Final ===
16 July 2011 / 19:20

Rank	Name	Nationality	Time	Notes
1st place, gold medalist(s)	Sindre Buraas	Norway	14:22.69	
2nd place, silver medalist(s)	Ross Millington	United Kingdom	14:22.78	
3rd place, bronze medalist(s)	Jesper van der Wielen	Netherlands	14:23.31	
4	Erik Johansson	Sweden	14:24.44	
5	Roberto Alaiz	Spain	14:24.62	
6	Indelau Tekele	Israel	14:24.75	
7	Richard Ringer	Germany	14:24.86	
8	Siarhei Platonau	Belarus	14:26.18	
9	Ahmed El Mazoury	Italy	14:27.90	
10	Bruno Albuquerque	Portugal	14:29.01	
11	Vyacheslav Shalamov	Russia	14:29.24	
12	Adam Bitchell	United Kingdom	14:29.57	
13	Simon Denissel	France	14:29.64	
14	Alexander Hahn	Germany	14:30.09	
15	Bashir Abdi	Belgium	14:30.52	
16	Soufiane Bouchikhi	Belgium	14:32.71	
17	Manuel Cominotto	Italy	14:36.82	
18	John McDonnell	United Kingdom	14:40.31	
19	Abdi Nageeye	Netherlands	14:44.35	
20	Lars Erik Malde	Norway	14:44.91	
21	Anton Danielson	Sweden	14:48.56	
22	Vincent Boucena	France	14:55.51	
23	Julien Di Maria	France	15:28.67	
	Aitor Fernández	Spain	DNF	
	Hayle Ibrahimov	Azerbaijan	DNF	

Intermediate times:
1000m: 3:00.43 Vincent Boucena France
2000m: 6:00.07 Hayle Ibrahimov Azerbaijan
3000m: 9:00.89 Vyacheslav Shalamov Russia
4000m: 11:50.37 Jesper van der Wielen Netherlands

== Participation ==
According to an unofficial count, 25 athletes from 14 countries participated in the event.

- Azerbaijan (1)
- Belarus (1)
- Belgium (2)
- France (3)
- Germany (2)
- Israel (1)
- Italy (2)
- Netherlands (2)
- Norway (2)
- Portugal (1)
- Russia (1)
- Spain (2)
- Sweden (2)
- United Kingdom (3)
