= Rondelli =

Rondelli, an Italian family name, can refer to:

People

- Giorgio Rondelli (1946–), Italian athletics coach
- Paolo Rondelli (1963–), Sammarinese politician
- Stefano "Steve" Rondelli, a gangster of Lucchese crime family

Fictional characters

- Vic Rondelli, a character from the film Silent Predators
