= Samuel Naibei Kiplimo =

Kenyan long-distance runner (born 1993)

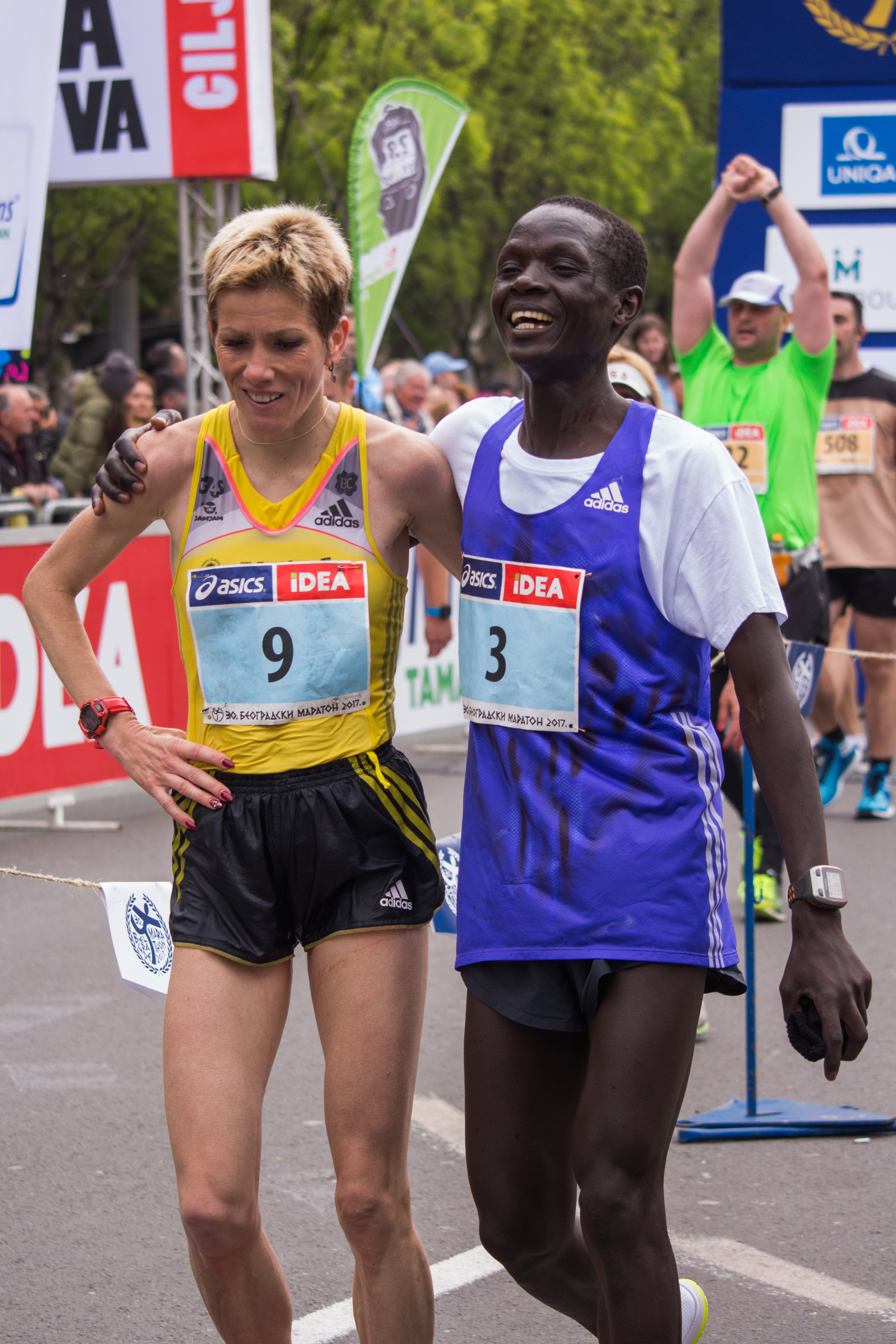
- Kiplimo and Olivera Jevtić at the Belgrade Marathon, 2017

Personal information
- Born: 17 June 1993 (age 33)

Sport
- Sport: Long-distance running

Samuel Naibei Kiplimo (born 17 June 1993) is a Kenyan long-distance runner.

Kiplimo finished first at the 2019 Split Half Marathon in Slovenia, a race which included president Borut Pahor as a runner. He finished first at the 2022 Iten International Marathon, with a time of 2:08:43. He finished first at the 2024 Florence Marathon, with a time of 2:12.50. He finished first at the 2024 Neapolis Marathon, with a time of 2:15.11, a 3-minute improvement from the previous record.
