= Rahib Məmmədov =

Azerbaijani hurdler

Personal information
- Born: 22 July 1992 (age 33) Baku, Azerbaijan

Sport
- Country: Azerbaijan
- Sport: Athletics
- Event: Hurdling

Rahib Məmmədov (born 22 July 1992 in Baku) is an Azerbaijani hurdler.

His personal best is of 14.06 (2018). He won the 110 m hurdles at 2011 European Team Championships. His personal best of 60 m hurdles indoor is the national record.
