= Svetlana Șepelev-Tcaci =

Moldovan long-distance runner

Personal information
- Nationality: Moldovan
- Born: 10 May 1969 (age 57) Ciolacu Nou, Făleşti, Moldovian SSR, Soviet Union

Sport
- Country: Moldova
- Sport: Long-distance running

Svetlana Şepelev-Tcaci (Russian: Светлана Ткач-Шепелева, romanized: Svetlana Tkach-Shepeleva; born 10 May 1969, in Ciolacu Nou, Făleşti) is a former Moldovan long-distance runner.

She competed for her country at the 2004 Summer Olympics in Athens, Greece, where she finished in 61st position in the marathon.

== Achievements ==
- All results regarding marathon, unless stated otherwise

Year	Competition	Venue	Position	Notes
Representing Moldova
1993	Riga Marathon	Riga, Latvia	1st	2:55:07
1995	Prague Marathon	Prague, Czech Republic	1st	2:39:33
1996	Podgorica Marathon	Podgorica, Montenegro	1st	2:49:35
1997	Podgorica Marathon	Podgorica, Montenegro	1st	2:49:25
1997	Prague Marathon	Prague, Czech Republic	2nd	2:34:09
1999	Podgorica Marathon	Podgorica, Montenegro	1st	2:42:46
2000	Grandma's Marathon	Duluth, United States	1st	2:33:53
2002	Istanbul Marathon	Istanbul, Turkey	2nd	2:37:57
2004	Olympic Games	Athens, Greece	61st	3:03:29
2006	Podgorica Marathon	Podgorica, Montenegro	1st	2:56:35
2008	Zagreb Marathon	Zagreb, Croatia	2nd	2:45:29
