= Esma Aydemir =

Turkish runner (born 1992)

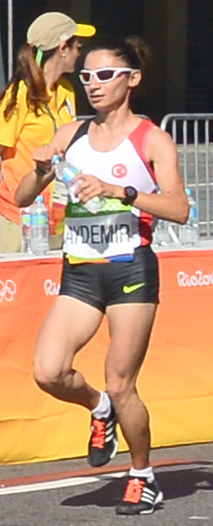

Personal information
- Nationality: Turkey
- Born: January 1, 1992 (age 34) Karakeçili, Kırıkkale Province, Turkey

Sport
- Sport: Running
- Events: 1500 m; 3000 m; 5000 m; 10,000 m; marathon
- Coached by: Mehmet Kiper

Achievements and titles
- Personal bests: 800 m 2:08.17 (2010); 1500 m 4:09.06 (2012); 3000 m 9:19.61 (2011); 5000 m 15:50.23 (2017); 10000 m 32:41.03 (2017); marathon 2:35:21 (2016)
Medal record
Women's athletics
Representing Turkey
European Team Championships
Bronze medal – third place	2017 Lille	5000 m
European Cup 10,000m
Bronze medal – third place	2017 Minsk	10,000m
Gold medal – first place	2016 Mersin	10,000m
European Junior Championships
Gold medal – first place	2011 Tallinn	5000 m
Silver medal – second place	2011 Tallinn	3000 m
Islamic Solidarity Games
Silver medal – second place	2013 Palembang	4×400 m relay

Esma Aydemir (born January 1, 1992, in Karakeçili, Kırıkkale Province, Turkey) is a Turkish middle distance and long-distance runner competing mostly in the 1500 m, 3000 m, 5000 m, 10,000 m and marathon events.

== Career ==
She began with running in Karakeçili town of Kırıkkale Province in 2005, discovered by Mehmet Kiper, national athlete and a physical education teacher in Antalya. With her parents permission, she followed him to Antalya, where she is trained by him. Currently, Esma Aydemir is a student at the Pamukkale University's Physical Education and Sports Technology Department. she is sponsored by the regional union of the Agriculture Credit Cooperative in Kütahya.

She won the silver medal in the 3000 m and the gold medal in the 5000 m event at the 2011 European Athletics Junior Championships held in Tallinn, Estonia.

Esma Aydemir is the holder of the national record in 1-mile race with 4:31.28 set in 2012. She won the silver medal in the 4 × 400 m relay event with her teammates Özge Akın, Birsen Engin and Sema Apak at the 2013 Islamic Solidarity Games held in Palembang, Indonesia.

Running marathon for the first time in her life, Aydemri took part at the 2016 Rotterdam Marathon and secured a slot for the 2016 Summer Olympics ranking 8th in the women's category with her time of 2:35:21. She won the gold medal at the 2016 European Cup 10,000m held in Mersin, Turkey.

== Achievements ==
Year	Competition	Venue	Position	Event	Notes
Representing Turkey
2010	World Junior Championships	Moncton, Canada	21st (sf)	800m	2:08.79
2010	World Junior Championships	Moncton, Canada	20th	3000m	9:43.03
2011	European Cross Country Championships	Velenje, Slovenia	8th	3.97 km	13:41 J
2011	European Junior Championships	Tallinn, Estonia	2nd	3000 m	9:19.61 J PB
2011	European Junior Championships	Tallinn, Estonia	1st	5000 m	16:12.16 J PB
2012	Turkish Teams Super and First League	İzmir, Turkey	1st	1500 m	4:09.06 PB
2012	67th Cezmi Or Memorial	Istanbul, Turkey	5th	5000 m	15:59.21 PB
2013	European U23 Championships	Tampere, Finland	10th	5000m	16:28.68
2013	3rd Islamic Solidarity Games	Palembang, Indonesia	2nd	4 × 400 m relay	43:53.26
2016	Rotterdam Marathon	Rotterdam, Netherlands	8th	marathon	2:35:21
2016	European Cup 10,000m	Mersin, Turkey	1st	10,000m	33:33.38
2017	European Cup 10,000m	Minsk, Belarus	3rd	10,000m	32:41.03 PB
2017	European Team Championships	Lille, France	3rd	5000m	15:50.23 PB
