= Mirko Petrović (athlete) =

Serbian long-distance runner

Personal information
- Born: May 10, 1981 Užice, SR Serbia, SFR Yugoslavia

Sport
- Country: Serbia
- Sport: Track, Long-distance running
- Event(s): 1500 metres, 3000 metres, 5000 meters, 10 km run
- Club: AK Mladost Užice and AK Čajetina Šljivovica

Achievements and titles
- Personal best(s): 1500 meters: 3:42.13; 3000 metres: 7:58.74; 5000 metres: 13:45.77

Mirko Petrović (Serbian Cyrillic: Мирко Петровић, born 10 May 1981) is a Serbian long-distance runner of who specialized in various long-distance track, cross country, and road running disciplines. Athletics began to train in 6.in the classroom elementary school. He won the Balkan Cross Country Championships in 2004, 2008, and 2011. In the course of his athletic career, Petrović represented FR Yugoslavia, Serbia and Montenegro, and Serbia.

== Running career ==
Petrović's first appearance in a major international competition took place when he ran the junior men's race at the 2000 IAAF World Cross Country Championships, finishing in 105th place out of 159 finishers.

In 2005, Petrović ran the men's 1500-metre at the 2005 Mediterranean Games, recording a time of 3:48.66 (min:sec), finishing just 0.58 seconds behind compatriot Darko Radomirović. Just two months later, Petrović ran two distances at the 2005 Summer Universiade. In addition to running the 1500 metres in 3:50.05, he also ran the 5000 metres at the same competition, running a time of 14:24.10.

In one of his earlier victories in major international competition, he won the 1500 metres race in Group B of the 2008 European Cup in front of a large crowd at Parc des Sports, Annecy. He ended the year being named "Sportsman of the Year" by the city of Užice.

In 2009, he ran the 1500-metres at the 2009 Mediterranean Games, finishing in 3:45.06, barely behind Christian Obrist. Just weeks later, he competed in two separate disciplines at the 2009 Summer Universiade. He ran in the men's 1500 metres and the men's 5000 metres, and qualified to the finals in both distances. In the 5000-metres he was extremely close to winning a medal, in addition to running an excellent race in the preliminary round, recording a time of 13:54.77 and finishing in first place. Two days later, however, he finished the 5000-metre final an excruciating two seconds from third-place finisher Elroy Gelant.

In 2010, he finished in second place in the Second League 3000 metres race at the 2010 European Team Championships. In the following year's European Team Championships, he finished in third and second in the 3000 metres and 5000 metres, respectively.

In 2013, Petrović finished in first place in the Second League 3000 metres at the 2013 European Team Championships. Just a week later he ran the 5000-metres at the 2013 Mediterranean Games.
