= Athletics at the 2005 Summer Universiade – Men's 5000 metres =

The men's 5000 metres event at the 2005 Summer Universiade was held on 19 August in İzmir, Turkey.

== Results ==
Rank	Athlete	Nationality	Time	Notes
1st place, gold medalist(s)	Wilson Busienei	Uganda	13:38.51	
2nd place, silver medalist(s)	Reid Coolsaet	Canada	13:39.90	
3rd place, bronze medalist(s)	Simon Ndirangu	Kenya	13:43.47	
4	Carles Castillejo	Spain	13:46.74	
5	Pablo Villalobos	Spain	13:53.77	
6	Sergey Ivanov	Russia	13:55.13	
7	Yuki Sato	Japan	13:57.35	
8	Jan Fitschen	Germany	13:59.87	
9	Ion Luchianov	Moldova	14:04.34	SB
10	Boy Soke	South Africa	14:07.23	SB
11	Philipp Bandi	Switzerland	14:10.20	
12	Srisung Boonthung	Thailand	14:10.56	NR
13	Samuel Kosgei	Uganda	14:12.62	SB
14	Micah Tirop	Kenya	14:15.74	PB
15	Mirko Petrović	Serbia and Montenegro	14:24.10	
16	Kristjan Hunter	Canada	14:24.79	PB
17	Fatih Bilgiç	Turkey	14:26.39	
18	Yasunori Murakami	Japan	14:41.48	
19	William Dale Summerville	New Zealand	14:48.51	
20	Ma Yinghu	China	15:04.46	SB
21	Leonard Halerimana	Rwanda	15:07.22	
22	Hamza Rzgalla Gomaa	Sudan	15:44.93	
23	Desire Budigoma	Burundi	15:53.40	
24	Amon Kankutula	Zambia	16:00.90	
	Hocine Boutria	Algeria	DNF	
	Henrik Them Andersen	Denmark	DNF	
	Slavko Petrović	Croatia	DNS	
	Park Young-anim	South Korea	DNS	
	Joakim Fayiah	Liberia	DNS	
	Halil Akkaş	Turkey	DNS	
