= 2011 European Athletics U23 Championships – Men's 10,000 metres =

The men's 10,000 metres at the 2011 European Athletics U23 Championships were held in Ostrava on 14 July.

== Medalists ==
Gold	Sondre Nordstad Moen; Norway (NOR)
Silver	Ahmed El Mazoury; Italy (ITA)
Bronze	Musa Roba-Kinkal; Germany (GER)

== Schedule ==
Date	Time	Round
14 July 2011	18:05	Final

== Results ==
=== Final ===
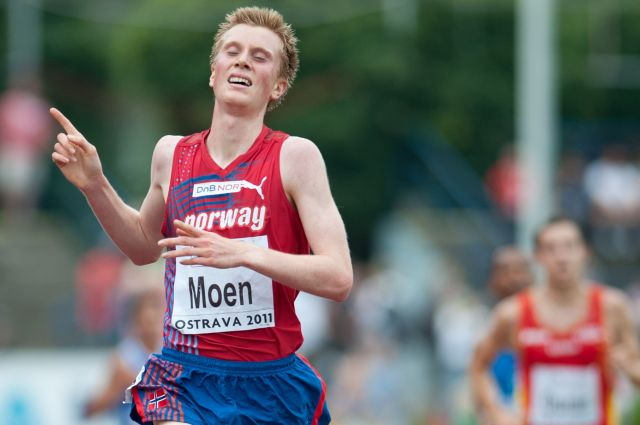
Sondre Nordstad Moen after winning the competition

Rank	Name	Nationality	Time	Notes
1st place, gold medalist(s)	Sondre Nordstad Moen	Norway	28:41.66	PB
2nd place, silver medalist(s)	Ahmed El Mazoury	Italy	28:46.97	PB
3rd place, bronze medalist(s)	Musa Roba-Kinkal	Germany	28:57.91	SB
4	Roman Pozdyaykin	Russia	29:07.23	PB
5	Vyacheslav Shalamov	Russia	29:15.84	PB
6	Koen Naert	Belgium	29:18.73	
7	Stijn Garain	Belgium	29:25.47	PB
8	Mats Lunders	Belgium	29:26.49	PB
9	Mikael Ekvall	Sweden	29:27.58	
10	Siarhei Platonau	Belarus	29:34.59	PB
11	Christoph Ryffel	Switzerland	29:35.32	PB
12	Lars Erik Malde	Norway	29:45.80	
13	Riccardo Sterni	Italy	29:46.29	
14	Dmytro Siruk	Ukraine	30:07.33	
15	Jose Costa	Portugal	30:25.20	
16	Nicolae Soare	Romania	30:34.41	
17	Robert Krebs	Germany	30:36.27	
18	Ihor Olefirenko	Ukraine	30:43.39	
19	Aitor Fernandez	Spain	30:51.81	
20	Guillém Durán	Spain	31:12.29	
21	Ageze Guadie	Israel	31:18.86	
	Yosi Goasdoué	France	DNS	

Intermediate times:
1000m: 2:52.17 Vyacheslav Shalamov Russia
2000m: 5:45.90 Vyacheslav Shalamov Russia
3000m: 8:39.26 Vyacheslav Shalamov Russia
4000m: 11:35.00 Vyacheslav Shalamov Russia
5000m: 14:31.68 Roman Pozdyaykin Russia
6000m: 17:26.95 Musa Roba-Kinkal Germany
7000m: 20:21.21 Sondre Nordstad Moen Norway
8000m: 23:07.87 Sondre Nordstad Moen Norway
9000m: 25:56.06 Sondre Nordstad Moen Norway

== Participation ==
According to an unofficial count, 21 athletes from 13 countries participated in the event.

- Belarus (1)
- Belgium (3)
- Germany (2)
- Israel (1)
- Italy (2)
- Norway (2)
- Portugal (1)
- Romania (1)
- Russia (2)
- Spain (2)
- Sweden (1)
- Switzerland (1)
- Ukraine (2)
