= Podgorica Marathon =

Annual race in Montenegro held since 1994

- Date: Last Sunday of October
- Location: Podgorica, Montenegro
- Event type: Road
- Distance: Marathon, half marathon
- Primary sponsor: Meridianbet
- Established: 1994 (32 years ago)
- Course records: Men's: 2:11:41 (1997) (Bulgaria) Petko Stefanov; Women's: 2:31:18 (2009) (Serbia) Olivera Jevtić
- Website: Podgorica Marathon
- Participants: 18 (2020); 148 (2019); 146 finishers (2018)

The Podgorica Marathon is an annual road running event in Montenegro, which features a full-length (42.195 km) marathon, half marathon as well as a 5 km fun run race.

== History ==
A group of enthusiasts came up with a plan to organise a marathon in Podgorica and the first edition took place on 8 October 1994.

The 2011 edition of the race featured more than 3000 runners from 33 countries. Slađana Perunović set a women's Montenegrin record in the marathon at the event, finishing second in a time of 2:41:02 hours.

In 2020, due to the coronavirus pandemic, organizers preponed the scheduled date from 8 November to 1 November, restricted the number of participants to 100, and moved the race to a circular track of length 1 km (0.62 mi).

== Course ==
External image
- Course map of full marathon in 2016

The 2014 course for the full-length marathon led from central Podgorica to the southern suburb of Golubovci, then east through the Zeta Plain, to the town of Tuzi, before returning to the center of the city.

The half marathon race course started in Danilovgrad, finishing at the center of Podgorica. The 5 km fun run course circles the urban center of Podgorica.

All the courses finish at the same spot, Independence Square.

== Winners ==
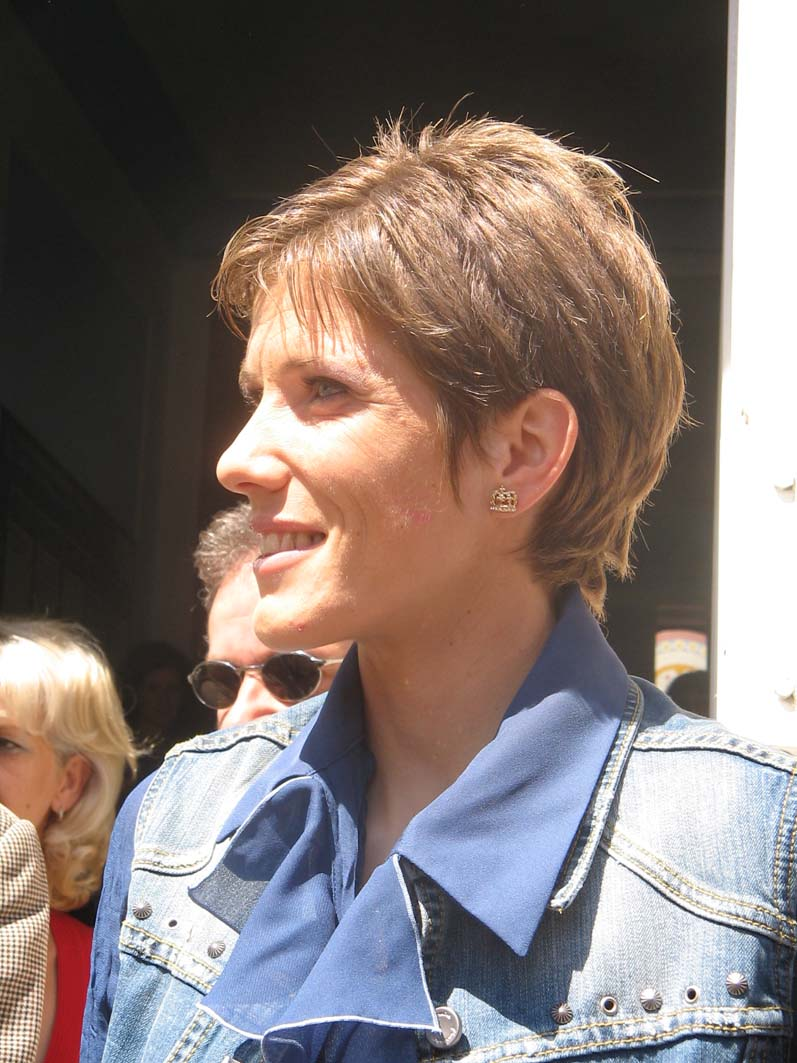
Olivera Jevtić, five-time winner and holder of the female course record

Key: Course record (in bold)

| Ed. | Date | Men's winner | Time | Women's winner | Time | Rf. |
|---|---|---|---|---|---|---|
| 1 | 1994 | Borislav Dević (YUG) | 2:23:24 | Ilona Kalmar (YUG) | 3:04:55 | |
| 2 | 1995 | Srba Nikolić (YUG) | 2:30:45 | Ilona Kalmar (YUG) | 3:04:08 | |
| 3 | 1996 | Wodajo Bulti (ETH) | 2:21:05 | Svetlana Șepelev-Tcaci (MDA) | 2:49:35 | |
| 4 | 1997 | Petko Stefanov (BUL) | **2:11:41** | Svetlana Șepelev-Tcaci (MDA) | 2:49:25 | |
| 5 | 1998 | Petko Stefanov (BUL) | 2:15:16 | Vesna Stevanović (YUG) | 2:45:25 | |
| 6 | 1999 | Yuriy Chizhov (RUS) | 2:22:29 | Svetlana Șepelev-Tcaci (MDA) | 2:42:46 | |
| 7 | 2000 | Sreten Ninković (YUG) | 2:28:08 | Vesna Stevanović (YUG) | 3:11:16 | |
| 8 | 2001 | Đuro Kodžo (BIH) | 2:30:11 | Vesna Stevanović (YUG) | 2:59:45 | |
| 9 | 2002 | Maricel Gaman (ROM) | 2:23:28 | Vesna Stevanović (YUG) | 2:45:54 | |
| 10 | 2003 | Emmanuel Kosgei (KEN) | 2:15:48 (Note: Course was at least 774 m (2,539 ft) short.) | Olesya Nurgalieva (RUS) | 2:36:08 | |
| 11 | 2004 | Iaroslav Mușinschi (MDA) | 2:21:41 | Tatyana Perepelkina (RUS) | 2:46:58 | |
| 12 | 2005 | Iaroslav Mușinschi (MDA) | 2:23:59 | Tatyana Perepelkina (RUS) | 2:41:56 | |
| 13 | 2006 | Luwis Masunda (ZIM) | 2:29:12 | Svetlana Șepelev-Tcaci (MDA) | 2:56:35 | |
| 14 | 2007 | Mike Fokoroni (ZIM) | 2:19:08 | Tatyana Perepelkina (RUS) | 2:47:12 | |
| 15 | 2008 | Iaroslav Mușinschi (MDA) | 2:14:50 | Olivera Jevtić (SRB) | 2:40:05 | |
| 16 | 2009 | Dmitry Safronov (RUS) | 2:11:51 | Olivera Jevtić (SRB) | **2:31:18** | |
| 17 | 2010 | Buliche Mendaya (ETH) | 2:16:05 | Ana Subotić (SRB) | 2:43:22 | |
| 18 | 2011 | Oleg Gurs (BLR) | 2:18:52 | Ana Subotić (SRB) | 2:40:36 | |
| 19 | 2012 | Elisha Sawe (KEN) | 2:19:23 | Olivera Jevtić (SRB) | 2:37:58 | |
| 20 | 2013 | Anthony Wangeci (KEN) | 2:15:00 | Slađana Perunović (MNE) | 2:42:35 | |
| 21 | 2014 | Silas Toek (KEN) | 2:16:02 | Olivera Jevtić (SRB) | 2:38:19 | |
| 22 | 2015 | Justus Kiprono (KEN) | 2:19:20 | Olivera Jevtić (SRB) | 2:39:32 | |
| 23 | 2016 | Abel Rop (KEN) | 2:19:17 | Gladys Biwott (KEN) | 2:42:18 | |
| 24 | 2017 | Abel Rop (KEN) | 2:15:29 | Rebby Koech (KEN) | 2:37:47 | |
| 25 | 2018 | Abel Rop (KEN) | 2:19:28 | Ruth Matebo (KEN) | 2:40:32 | |
| 26 | 2019 | Hosea Tuei (KEN) | 2:15:50 | Ruth Matebo (KEN) | 2:42:53 | |
| 27 | 2020 | Dragoljub Koprivica (MNE) | 2:46:26 | Slađana Perunović (MNE) | 3:08:24 | |
