= 2013 European 10,000m Cup =

- Organisers: EAA
- Edition: 17th
- Date: 8 June
- Host city: (Bulgaria) Pravets
- Events: 2

The 2013 European 10,000m Cup was the 17th edition of the European 10,000m Cup took place on 8 June in Pravets, Bulgaria.

== Individual ==
=== Men ===
Rank	Athlete	Country	Time	Notes
1st place, gold medalist(s)	Sergio Sánchez	Spain	28.31,75	SB
2nd place, silver medalist(s)	Halil Akkaş	Turkey	28.31,82	PB
3rd place, bronze medalist(s)	Ahmed El Mazoury	Italy	28.36,40	PB
4	Stefano La Rosa	Italy	28.51,39	SB
5	Mikael Ekvall	Sweden	28.55,87	SB
6	Tasama Moogas	Israel	28.57,84	
7	Andrea Lalli	Italy	29.05,13	SB
8	Manuel Ángel Penas	Spain	29.17,78	SB
9	Djamel Bachiri	France	29.18,91	
10	José Moreira	Portugal	29.22,64	SB

=== Women ===
Rank	Athlete	Country	Time	Notes
1st place, gold medalist(s)	Sabrina Mockenhaupt	Germany	32.13,64	SB
2nd place, silver medalist(s)	Christelle Daunay	France	32.46,39	
3rd place, bronze medalist(s)	Olivera Jevtić	Serbia	32.52,56	SB
4	Zsófia Erdélyi	Hungary	33.09,73	
5	Diana Lobacevske	Lithuania	33.22,02	PB
6	Sonia Bejarano	Spain	33.40,35	
7	Judith Pla	Spain	33.56,98	PB
8	Catarina Ribeiro	Portugal	34.00,30	SB
9	Sonia Samuels	United Kingdom	34.00,51	SB
10	Silvia Danekova	Bulgaria	34.00,77	PB

== Team ==
In italic the participants whose result did not go into the team's total time, but awarded with medals.

Men
Rank	Nation	Time
1st place, gold medalist(s)	Italy; Ahmed El Mazoury; Stefano La Rosa; Andrea Lalli; Gianmarco Buttazzo; Stefano Scaini	1:26:32,92
2nd place, silver medalist(s)	Spain	1:27:23,76

Women
Rank	Nation	Time
1st place, gold medalist(s)	Spain	1:42:00,90
2nd place, silver medalist(s)	United Kingdom	1:42:07,44
3rd place, bronze medalist(s)	Belarus	1:43:03,61
