= Olivera Jevtić =

Serbian long-distance runner (born 1977)

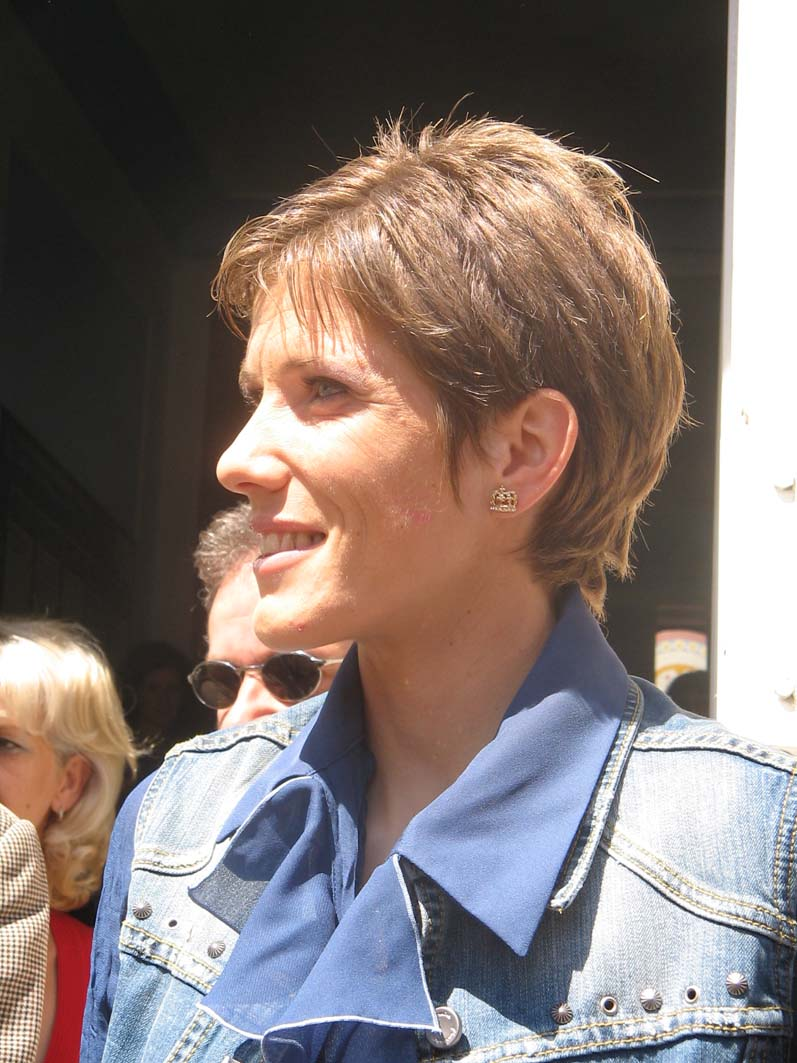
- Jevtić in 2006

Personal information
- Nickname: Olja
- Born: 24 July 1977 (age 49) Titovo Užice, SR Serbia, Yugoslavia
- Height: 1.74 m (5 ft 9 in)
- Weight: 52 kg (115 lb)

Sport
- Sport: Athletics
- Events: 5000 m, 10,000 m, Half marathon, Marathon, Cross country running

Achievements and titles
- Personal bests: 5000 meters: 15:11.25; 10,000 meters: 31:29.65; Marathon: 2:25:23
Medal record
Representing Yugoslavia / Serbia and Montenegro / Serbia
European Championships
Silver medal – second place	2006 Gothenburg	Marathon
European Cross Country Championships
Bronze medal – third place	1997 Oeiras	Senior race
Bronze medal – third place	1998 Ferrara	Senior race
Bronze medal – third place	1999 Velenje	Senior race
Bronze medal – third place	2000 Malmö	Senior race
Bronze medal – third place	2006 San Giorgio su Legnano	Senior race
Mediterranean Games
Gold medal – first place	2009 Pescara	10,000 m
Silver medal – second place	2001 Tunis	10,000 m
Bronze medal – third place	1997 Bari	10,000 m
Bronze medal – third place	2001 Tunis	5.000 m
Bronze medal – third place	2005 Almería	Half marathon
Bronze medal – third place	2005 Almería	10.000 m
European U23 Championships
Gold medal – first place	1997 Turku	10,000 m
Gold medal – first place	1999 Gothenburg	10,000 m
Bronze medal – third place	1999 Gothenburg	5.000 m
World Junior Championships
Silver medal – second place	1996 Sydney	5000 m
European Junior Championships
Silver medal – second place	1995 Nyiregyhaza	3000 m
Bronze medal – third place	1995 Nyiregyhaza	5.000 m

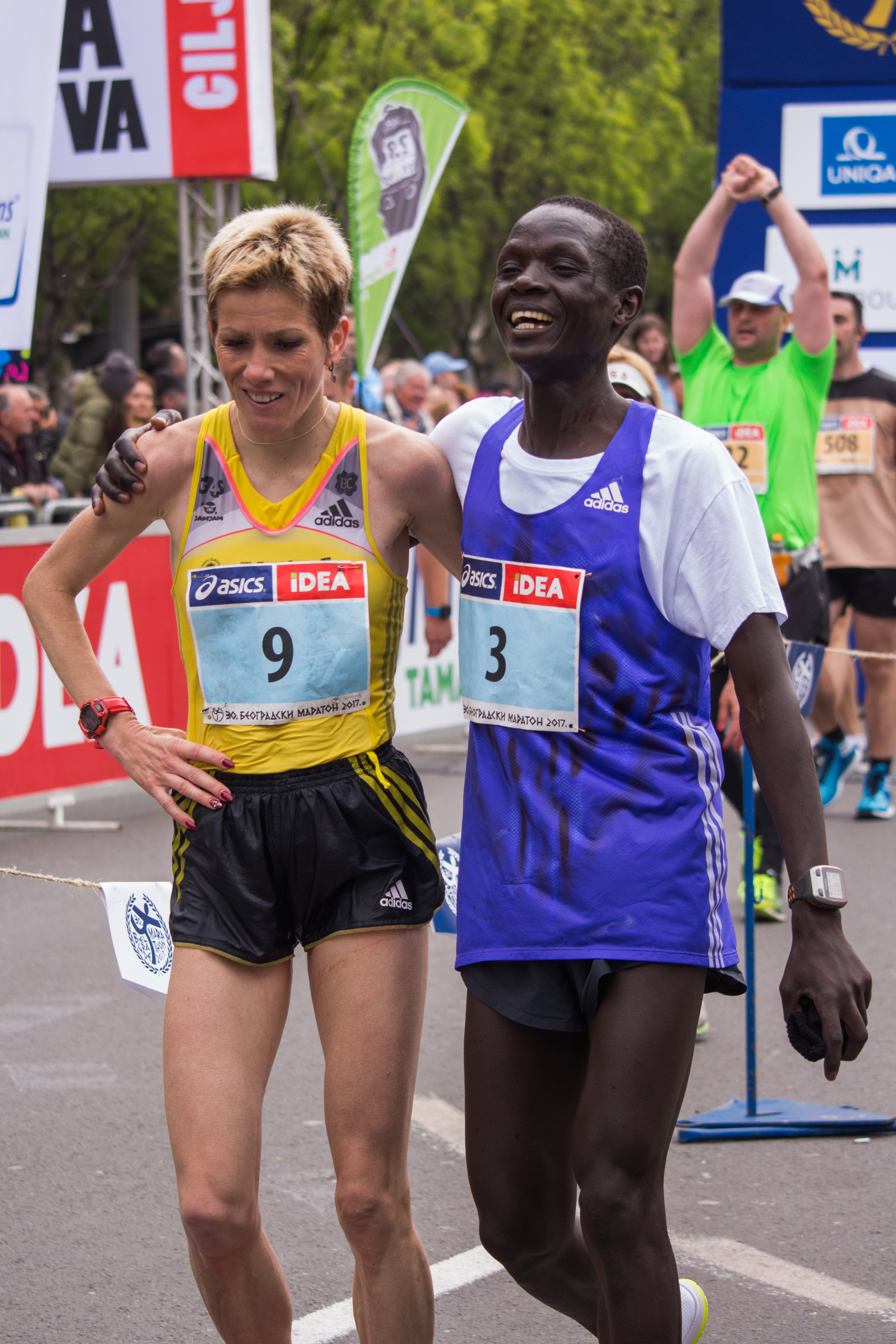
Olivera Jevtić and Samuel Naibei Kiplimo in the 2017 Belgrade Marathon finishing at 2:38:03 (Jevtić) and 2:38:43 (Kiplimo)

Olivera Jevtić (Serbian Cyrillic: Оливера Јевтић, born 24 July 1977) is a Serbian long-distance runner. She has represented her country (FR Yugoslavia, Serbia and Montenegro, and Serbia) five times at the Olympics in 2000, 2004, 2008, 2012 and 2016.

== Running career ==
Jevtić was born in Titovo Užice, Yugoslavia, otherwise known presently as Užice, Serbia. Her parents are father Milorad and mother Draginja. She is based in her native city, coached by Slavoljub "Slavko" Kuzmanović, and she competes for the running club AK Mladost Užice. Jevtić holds the Serbian marathon record of 2:25:23, which she established at the Rotterdam Marathon in 2003. She won the silver medal in the marathon at the 2006 European Athletics Championships in Gothenburg, Sweden. In December 2007, coach Kuzmanović and Jevtić went on an altitude training trip to Eldoret, Kenya, when violent conflict erupted from the 2007 Kenyan election crisis. Although they wanted to continue working out in spite of the violence, her training partner, Stanley Kipruto, insisted that their lives were in danger and led them out of Eldoret so that they could leave the country from Jomo Kenyatta International Airport. After Jevtić and Kuzmanović were picked up by a Serbian diplomat-evacuation flight, Kipruto was caught by rebels, tortured, and lost four fingers. Subsequent to the violence in Kenya, Kipruto moved in to live with Jevtić and Kuzmanović in Užice and joined their running team Mladost.

She won the women's race at the Balkan Cross Country Championships in March 2011.

Jevtić was selected as young athlete of the year of 1996. In 2006, she was awarded Golden Badge of Sport, award for the sportsperson of the Year in Serbia, and the same year, and the 1998 and 1999 was declared the best sportswoman by the Olympic Committee of Serbia and Yugoslavia.

Jevtić was stripped of third place in 2002 New York City Marathon and received a public warning after testing positive for the banned drug ephedrine. The president of NYRR at the time, Alan Steinfeld, told the New York Times that it was likely an "innocent mistake" and that ephedrine is common in cough suppressants.

During the start of the 2020 Sofia Marathon in Bulgaria, Jevtić was assaulted by the Bulgarian citizen.

== National titles ==
- Yugoslav Athletics Championships
  - 1500 m: 1994, 1996
  - 5000 m: 1996
- Yugoslav Half Marathon Championships
  - Women's race: 1998, 1999, 2002
- Yugoslavia Cross Country Championships
  - Women's race: 1994, 1995, 1996, 1997, 1998, 1999, 2000

== Results ==
- 2021 Belgrade Half Marathon 1st place
- 2015 Sarajevo Half Marathon 1st place
- 2014 Sarajevo Half Marathon 1st place
- 2013 European Team Championships, Second league 5000 m - 1st place
- 2013 European Cup 10,000m - 3rd place
- 2013 Belgrade Marathon 1st place
- 2012 European Cross Country Championships 26th place
- 2012 Podgorica Marathon 1st place
- 2011 European Cross Country Championships 21st place
- 2011 Torino Marathon 5th place
- 2010 European Championship marathon 4th place
- 2009 Saint Silvester Road Race 2nd place
- 2009 Sarajevo Half Marathon 1st place
- 2009 Belgrade Half Marathon 1st place
- 2009 Podgorica Marathon 1st place
- 2008 Belgrade Half Marathon 1st place
- 2007 Porto Half Marathon 2nd place
- 2006 Boston Marathon 7th place
- 2006 European Championship marathon silver medal
- 2005 Saint Silvester Marathon 1st place
- 2004 Boston Marathon 3rd place
- 2004 Olympic Games marathon 6th place
- 2003 New York City Marathon 9th place
- 2003 World Championship marathon 8th place
- 2003 Rotterdam Marathon 1st place
- 2002 New York City Marathon 3rd place (debut and DSQ)
- 2002 New York City Mini Marathon 4th place
- 2001 World Half Marathon Championships 7th place
- 1998 Saint Silvester Marathon 1st place
- 1998 European Championship 10,000 m fourth
- 1998 European Championship 5000 m fourth
- 1996 World Junior Championship in Athletics 5000 m silver medal

== See also ==
- Serbian records in athletics
- Serbia and Montenegro at the 2004 Summer Olympics
- Yugoslavia at the 2000 Summer Olympics

Awards
Preceded by Vladan Marković	The Best Young Athlete of Yugoslavia; 1996	Succeeded by Saša Stolić
Preceded by Danilo Ikodinović	The Best Athlete of Serbia; 2006	Succeeded by Novak Djokovic
