= AK Mladost Užice =

Serbian athletics club

Atletski Klub Mladost Užice (Serbian Cyrillic: Атлетски Клуб Младост Ужице) is an athletics club based in Užice. It is one of the most successful athletics clubs in Serbia, and is particularly known for producing long-distance runners.

== History ==
In the club's recent history, the role of coach has been occupied by both Kuzmanović brothers Dragiša and Slavoljub, as well as Dragovan Ilić. Although the club trains on the rubber track at Užice City Stadium, the club has suffered from an almost nonexistent budget and has rarely afforded equipment necessary for some of its athletes. The lack of money in the club is such that its javelin throwers get javelins loaned to them, and long-distance runners are sent to Zlatibor where there is more open space to run than in Užice. In spite of financial hardship, the club has frequently produced great athletes, many of which have represented Serbia in international competition.

== Notable athletes ==
- Olivera Jevtić, Olympian marathoner
- Mirko Petrović
- Sreten Ninković
- Predrag Ranđelović
- Nemanja Cerovac
- Kristijan Stošić
- Stenlay Kipruto
- Danijel Vukajlović
- Željko Čeliković
- Nikola Stamenić
- Bogdan Pantić
- Snežana Kostić
- Jovana Ajdanić
