= Iaroslav Mușinschi =

Moldovan long-distance runner

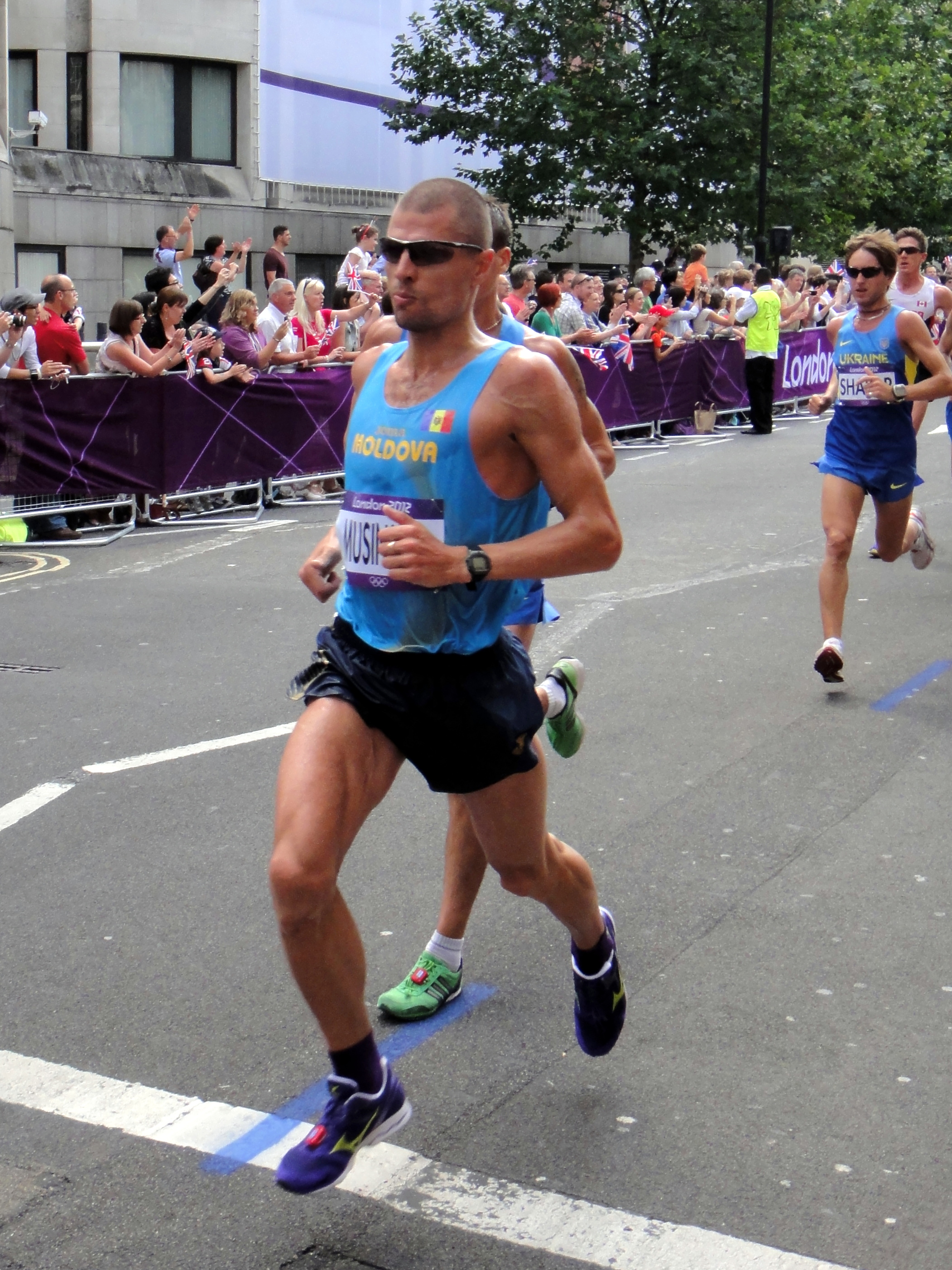
- Mușinschi in the marathon at the 2012 Olympics in London

Personal information
- Born: August 8, 1976 (age 50) Chișinău, Moldavian SSR, Soviet Union
- Height: 1.82 m (5 ft 11 1/2 in)
- Weight: 72 kg (159 lb)

Sport
- Country: Moldova
- Sport: Athletics
- Event: Marathon

Iaroslav Mușinschi (born 8 August 1976) is a Moldovan long-distance runner who competes in marathon races. He represented his country at the Summer Olympics in 2000, 2008 and 2012.

== Biography ==
Born in Chișinău and raised in Ocnița, he originally specialized in the 3000 metres steeplechase. In that event he finished fourteenth at the 2001 Summer Universiade and fourth at the 2003 Summer Universiade, and competed at the 2000 Olympic Games without reaching the final. His personal best time is 8:29.98 minutes, achieved in July 1999 in Belaya Tserkov. During the indoor season he competed in the 3000 metres. Here he competed at the 2001 World Indoor Championships, the 2006 World Indoor Championships and the 2007 European Indoor Championships without reaching the final.

He has later shifted to the marathon. He competed without finishing at the 2007 World Championships, and finished 41st at the 2008 Olympic Games. He ran a personal best time of 2:11:43 hours in October 2008 at the Istanbul Marathon and improved further to record a time of 2:10:15 hours at the 2009 Ljubljana Marathon, where he was edged into second place in the final stretch by Kenya's William Biama. He won the Düsseldorf Marathon in April 2010, setting a course record and personal best time of 2:08:32. He performed poorly at the Lake Biwa Marathon in March 2011 as he finished two minutes behind the top 15 athletes. His best run of the year (2:12:07) came at the Gyeongju International Marathon, where he finished in fourth place. He competed in the marathon at the 2012 Summer Olympics, finishing in 25th place.

== Achievements ==
Year	Competition	Venue	Position	Event	Notes
2004	Podgorica Marathon	Podgorica, Montenegro	1st	Marathon	2:21:41
2005	Podgorica Marathon	Podgorica, Montenegro	1st	Marathon	2:23:59
2007	World Championships	Osaka, Japan	—	Marathon	DNF
2008	Podgorica Marathon	Podgorica, Montenegro	1st	Marathon	2:14:50
