= Marta Esteban =

Spanish long-distance runner

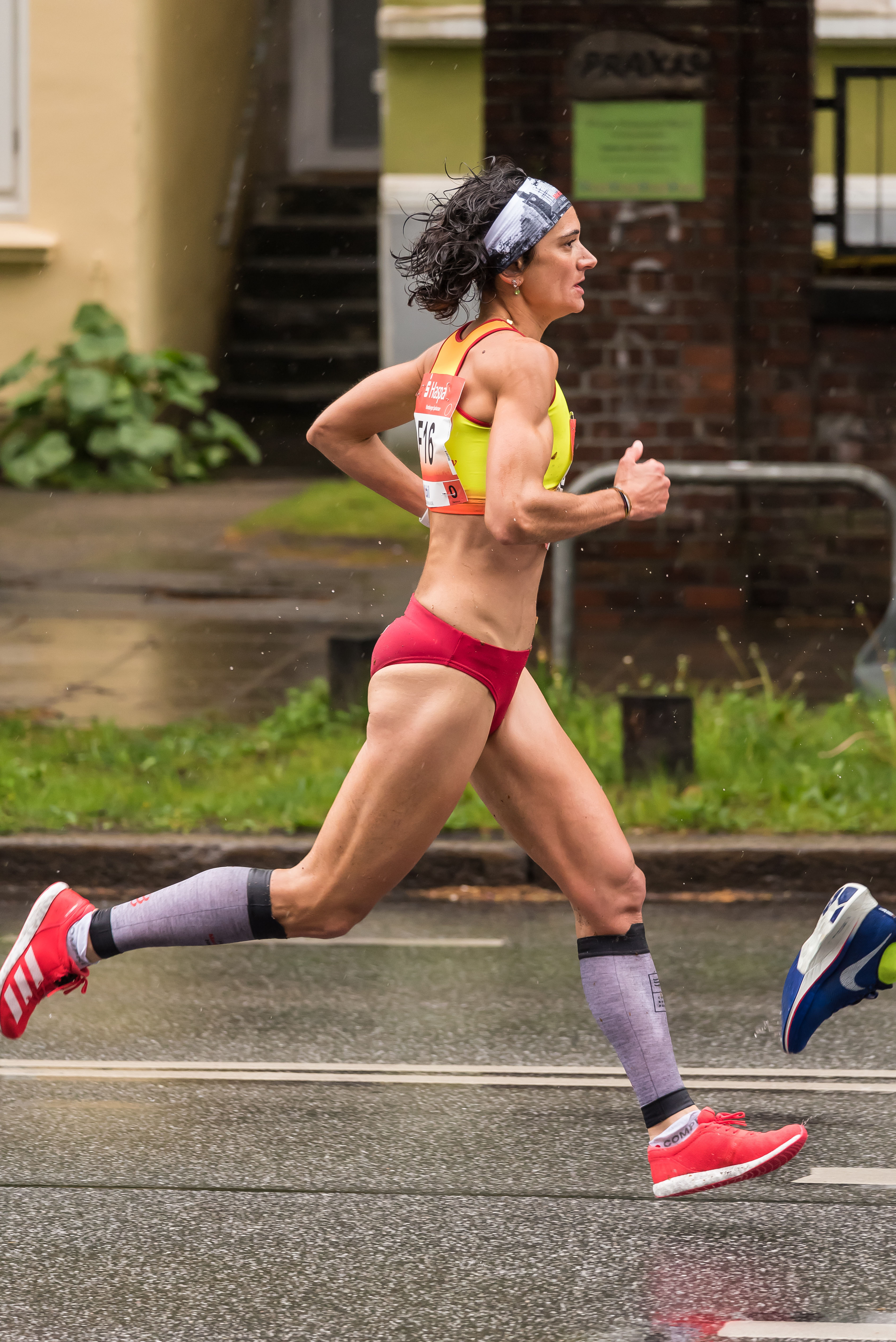

Personal information
- Nationality: Spanish
- Born: 6 November 1982 (age 43)

Sport
- Sport: Long-distance running
- Event: Marathon

Marta Esteban Poveda (born 6 November 1982) is a Spanish long-distance runner. She competed in the women's marathon at the 2017 World Championships in Athletics.

== Achievements ==
Year	Competition	Venue	Position	Event	Notes
Representing Spain
2016	World Half Marathon Championships	Cardiff, United Kingdom	64th	Half marathon	1:16:52
2017	European 10,000 m Cup	Minsk, Belarus	18th	10,000 m	34:10.42
2017	World Championships	London, United Kingdom	21st	Marathon	2:33:37
2018	World Half Marathon Championships	Valencia, Spain	60th	Half Marathon	1:14:47
