= Siarhei Platonau =

Belarusian long-distance runner

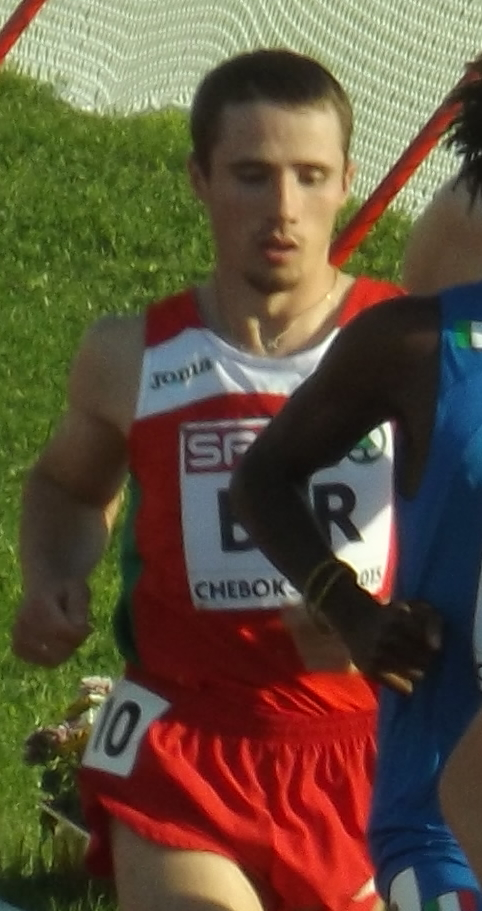
Siarhei Platonau at the 2015 European Team Championships

Siarhei Uladzimiravich Platonau (Belarusian: Сяргей Уладзіміравіч Платонаў; born 12 December 1990) is a Belarusian long-distance runner.

== Achievements ==
Year	Competition	Venue	Position	Event	Notes
Representing Belarus
2009	European Junior Championships	Novi Sad, Serbia	3rd	10 000 m	30:55.92
2011	European Indoor Championships	Paris, France	13th	3000 m	8:09.22
2011	European U23 Championships	Ostrava, Czech Republic	8th	5000m	14:26.18
2011	European U23 Championships	Ostrava, Czech Republic	10th	10,000m	29:34.59
