= Darko Živanović =

Serbian long-distance runner

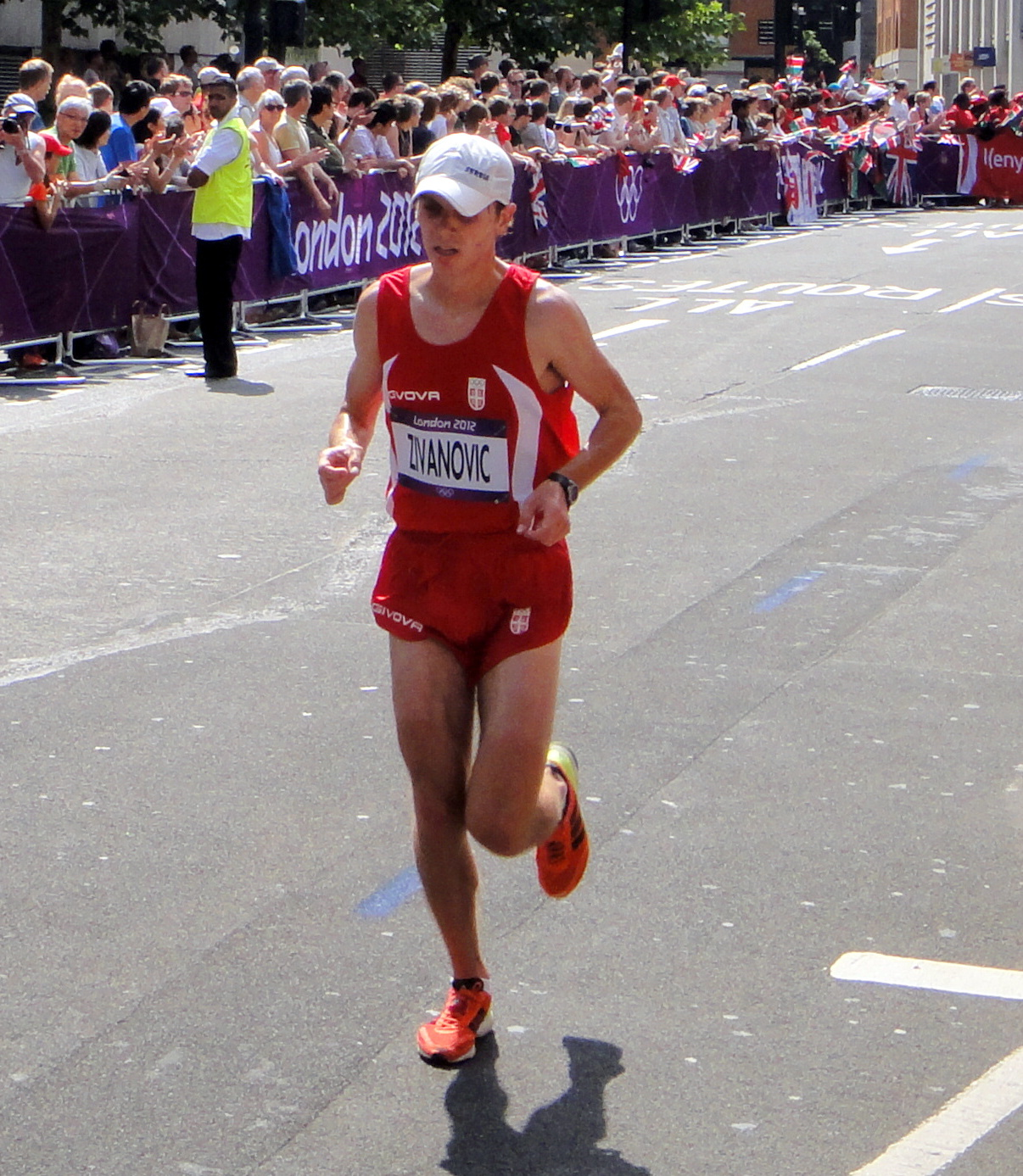
- Živanović in the marathon at the 2012 Olympics in London

Personal information
- Native name: Дарко Живановић
- Nationality: Serbian
- Born: 25 February 1987 (age 39) Kragujevac, SR Serbia, Yugoslavia
- Height: 1.78 m (5 ft 10 in)
- Weight: 63 kg (139 lb)

Sport
- Sport: Athletics
- Event(s): Marathon, 3000 metres steeplechase
- Club: Radnički Kragujevac

Achievements and titles
- Personal best(s): Marathon: 2:17:10; 3000 m steeplechase: 8:54.85

Darko Živanović (Serbian Cyrillic: Дарко Живановић; born 25 February 1987) is a Serbian long-distance runner.

Before he started to train athletics in 2006, he practised wrestling and football. His coach is Vlastimir "Vlasta" Stevanović.

In his career, he ran two marathons. At the 2012 Rotterdam Marathon, he ran his personal best of 2:17:10, which was enough for the Olympic B standards. He represented Serbia at the 2012 Summer Olympics but didn't finish the race.
