= Elena Popescu =

Moldovan middle-distance runner

Elena Popescu (born 6 September 1989, Chișnău) is a Moldovan middle-distance runner. At the 2012 Summer Olympics, she competed in the Women's 800 metres.
