= Olha Kotovska =

Ukrainian long-distance runner

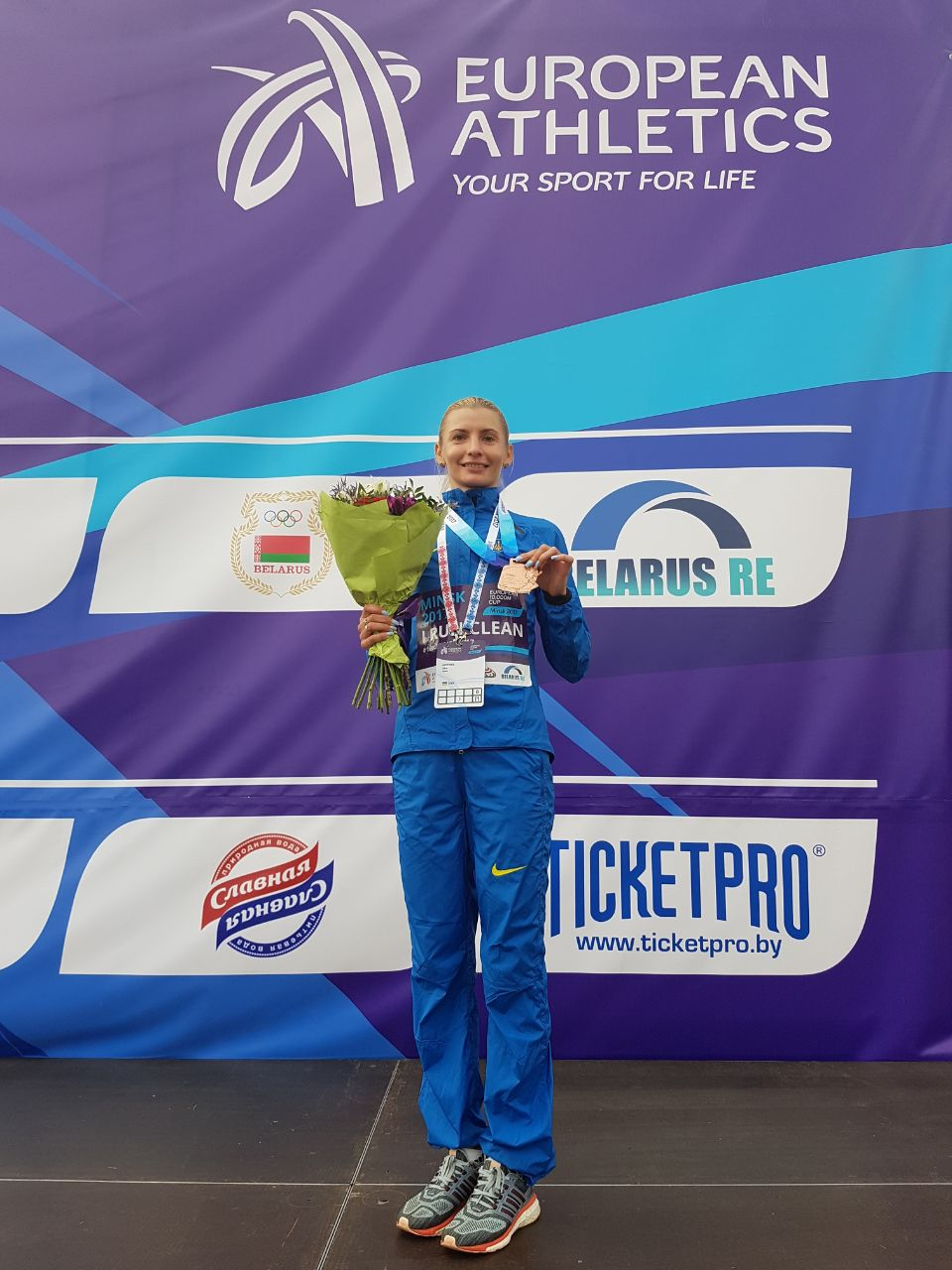

Personal information
- Born: 5 December 1983 (age 42)

Sport
- Sport: Track and field
- Event: Marathon

Olha Kotovska (born 5 December 1983) is a Ukrainian long-distance runner who specialises in the marathon. She competed in the women's marathon event at the 2016 Summer Olympics.
