= Sondre Nordstad Moen =

Norwegian long-distance runner

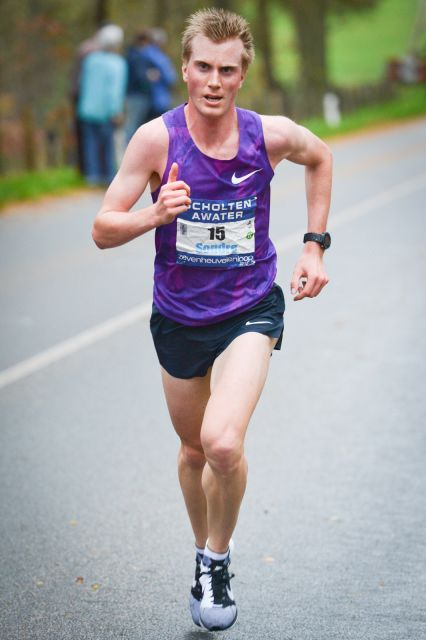
- Sondre Nordstad Moen in 2015

Personal information
- Nationality: Norwegian
- Born: 12 January 1991 (age 35) Trondheim, Norway
- Height: 178 cm (5 ft 10 in)
- Weight: 62 kg (137 lb)

Sport
- Sport: Athletics
- Event: Long-distance running
- Club: Strindheim IL; SK Vidar; IL ROS
- Coached by: Kristian Ulriksen

Sondre Nordstad Moen (born 12 January 1991) is a Norwegian long-distance runner. He set a European record in marathon in 2017 when winning the Fukuoka Marathon, a record he held for ten months. He has also held European records in 25,000 metres, and in one hour run.

== Personal life ==
Nordstad Moen was born in Trondheim on 12 January 1991.

== Career ==
Moen qualified to compete at the 2016 Summer Olympics in Rio de Janeiro, where he finished 19th in the marathon with a time of 2:14:17.

After the Olympic Games in Rio, he asked the Italian Coach Renato Canova to follow his training, and the collaboration produced big improvement: European Marathon Record in Fukuoka (2:05:48 in 2017), Nordic Records in 10000m (27:24.79 in Kristiansand in 2019) and in Half Marathon (59:47 in 2017).

His achievements include victory at the Nordic Cross Country Championships in 2010, and a gold medal in 10,000 metres at the 2011 European Athletics U23 Championships. Moen holds multiple Norwegian records, including the 10,000 metres, half marathon and the marathon.

On 2 December 2017, Moen won the Fukuoka Marathon in a time of 2:05:48. He was the first European ever to complete a marathon in less than 2:06. In 2018, he competed in the men's marathon at the 2018 European Athletics Championships held in Berlin, Germany. He did not finish his race. As of October 2021, he is the fourth fastest European ever over the distance behind Kaan Kigen Özbilen, Bashir Abdi and Mo Farah His marathon time of 2:05,48 from 2017 was Norwegian record until December 2025, when Awet Nftalem Kibrab set a new Norwegian record with the time 2:04,24 in a competition in Valencia.

During the Impossible Games at Bislett in June 2020, Moen set a European record on 25,000 metre with time 1:12:46.5.

In August 2020 he set a European record in one hour run, running 21,131, and beating Jos Hermens' 44 years old record. He held this European record only for one month, when Mo Farah set a new world record in September the same year with 21,330 meter.

In May 2025, Moen was disqualified at the 2025 the Göteborg Half Marathon after attempting to obstruct Suldan Hassan near the finish line.
