= Stsiapan Rahautsou =

Belarusian long-distance runner

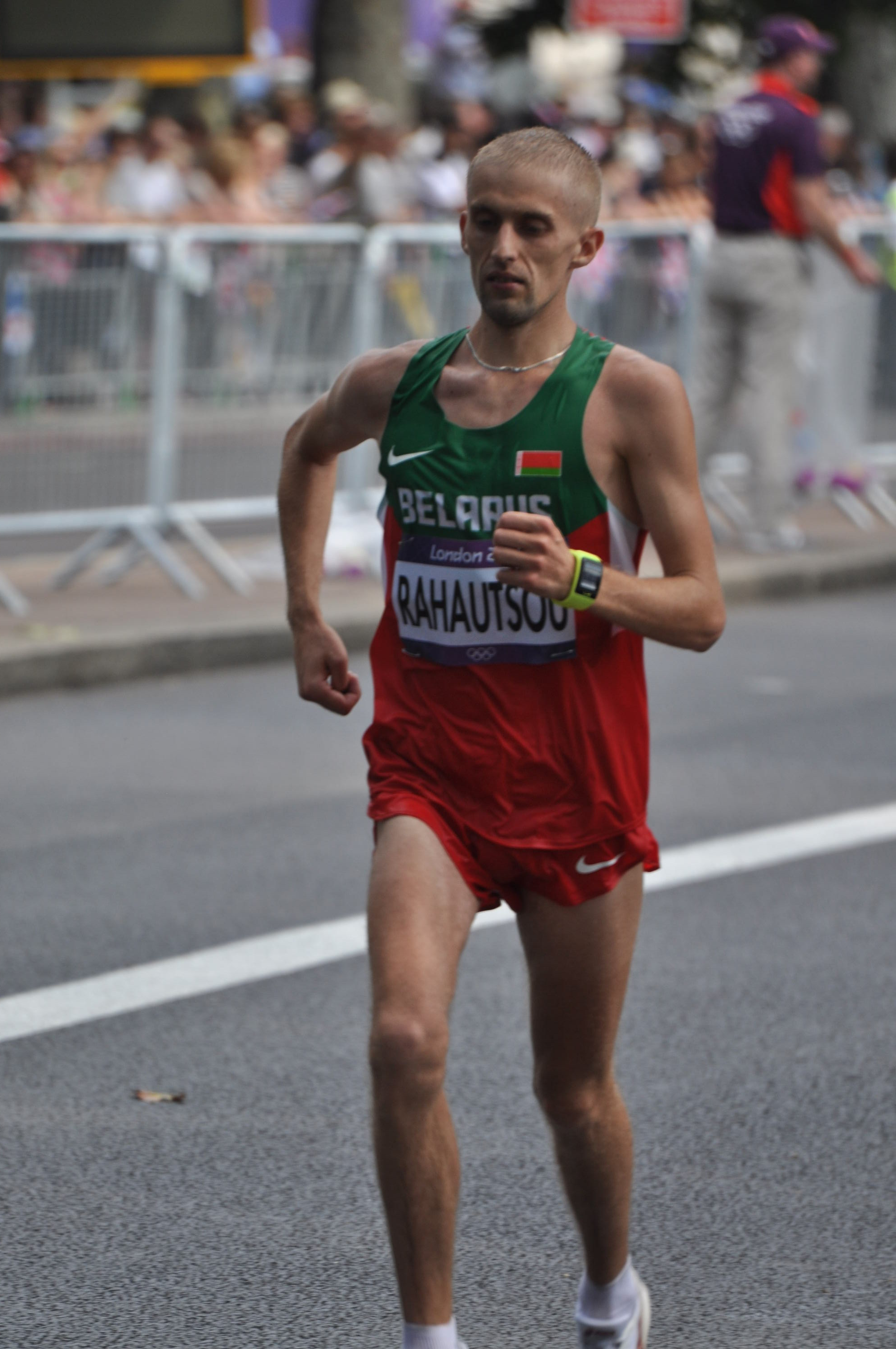
- Rahautsou in the marathon at the 2012 Olympics in London

Personal information
- Native name: Сцяпан Валер'евіч Рагаўцоў
- Born: 29 May 1986 (age 39) Antonava Buda, Byalynichy Raion
- Height: 1.74 m (5 ft 9 in)
- Weight: 58 kg (128 lb)

Sport
- Country: Belarus
- Sport: Athletics
- Event: Marathon

Stsiapan Valeryevich Rahautsou (Belarusian: Сцяпан Валер'евіч Рагаўцоў, Russian: Степан Валерьевич Роговцов, romanized: Stepan Valeryevich Rogovtsov; born 29 May 1986) is a Belarusian long-distance runner. At the 2012 Summer Olympics, he competed in the Men's marathon, finishing in 64th place.
