= Ahmed El Mazoury =

Italian long-distance runner (born 1990)

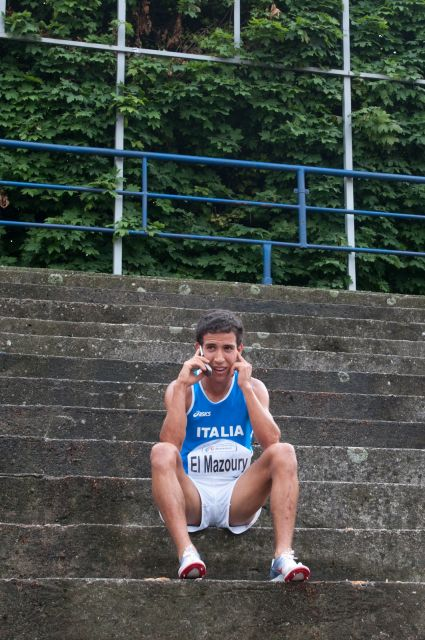

Personal information
- Nationality: Italian
- Born: 15 March 1990 (age 36) Ain Mazzi, Morocco
- Height: 1.70 m (5 ft 7 in)
- Weight: 55 kg (121 lb)

Sport
- Country: Italy
- Sport: Athletics
- Event: Long-distance running
- Club: G.S. Fiamme Gialle
- Coached by: Giorgio Rondelli

Achievements and titles
- Personal bests: 3000 m: 8:11.98 (2008); 5000 m: 13:34.20 (2011); 10,000 m: 28:37.29 (2016)
Medal record
European Cross Country Championships
Bronze medal – third place	2014 Samokov	Team
European 10,000m Cup
Gold medal – first place	2013 Pravets	Team
Gold medal – first place	2015 Cagliari	Team
Silver medal – second place	2014 Pravets	Team
Silver medal – second place	2017 Minsk	Team
Bronze medal – third place	2013 Pravets	Individual
European U23 Championships
Silver medal – second place	2011 Ostrava	10,000 metres

Ahmed El Mazoury (born 15 March 1990) is an Italian born Moroccan male long-distance runner.

== Biography ==
Ahmed El Mazoury was born in Morocco on 15 March 1990. He moved to Italy at the age of 3, and lives in Brivio.

He won two national championships at senior level. He also won a silver medal at under 23 international level at the 2011European U23 Championships, finished top 8 in a competition at the highest level outside of the Olympic Games and World championships, he finished 6th at the 2017 European 10,000m Cup and competed at the 2011 IAAF World Cross Country Championships (senior race).

== Personal best ==
- 10,000 m: 28:37.29 ( (Italy) Fucecchio, 9 Aprile 2016)

== Achievements ==
Year	Competition	Venue	Position	Event	Time	Notes
2011	European U23 Championships	(Czech Republic) Ostrava	2nd	10,000 m	28:46.97	PB
2016	European Championships	(Netherlands) Amsterdam	9th	10,000 m	29:29.36	
2017	European 10,000m Cup	(Belarus) Minsk	6th	10,000 m	29:09.93	
2017	European 10,000m Cup	(Belarus) Minsk	2nd	10,000 m team	1:27:35.99	

== National titles ==
- Italian Athletics Championships
  - 10,000 metres: 2016, 2017
  - Half marathon: 2018
