= Giorgio Rondelli =

Italian athletics coach

Personal information
- Nationality: Italian
- Born: February 11, 1946 (age 79) Milan, Italy

Sport
- Country: Italy
- Sport: Athletics
- Event: Long-distance running

Giorgio Rondelli (born 11 February 1946) is an Italian athletics coach, best known for being the personal coach of Olympic and world champion Alberto Cova.

== Biography ==
After a brief career as an athlete with decent results in the middle distance, so much to dress for four times the jersey of the junior national team, Giorgio Rondelli, in the second half of the 1970s, became a coach for the same sector of one of the oldest Italian sports clubs, the Pro Patria Milano (today CUS Pro Patria Milan, after the merger with CUS Milano), a role that he still holds. In addition to a coaching career he is also a sports journalist from a long time.

He has spoken at athletics coaching conferences, sharing his techniques.

== Athletes ==
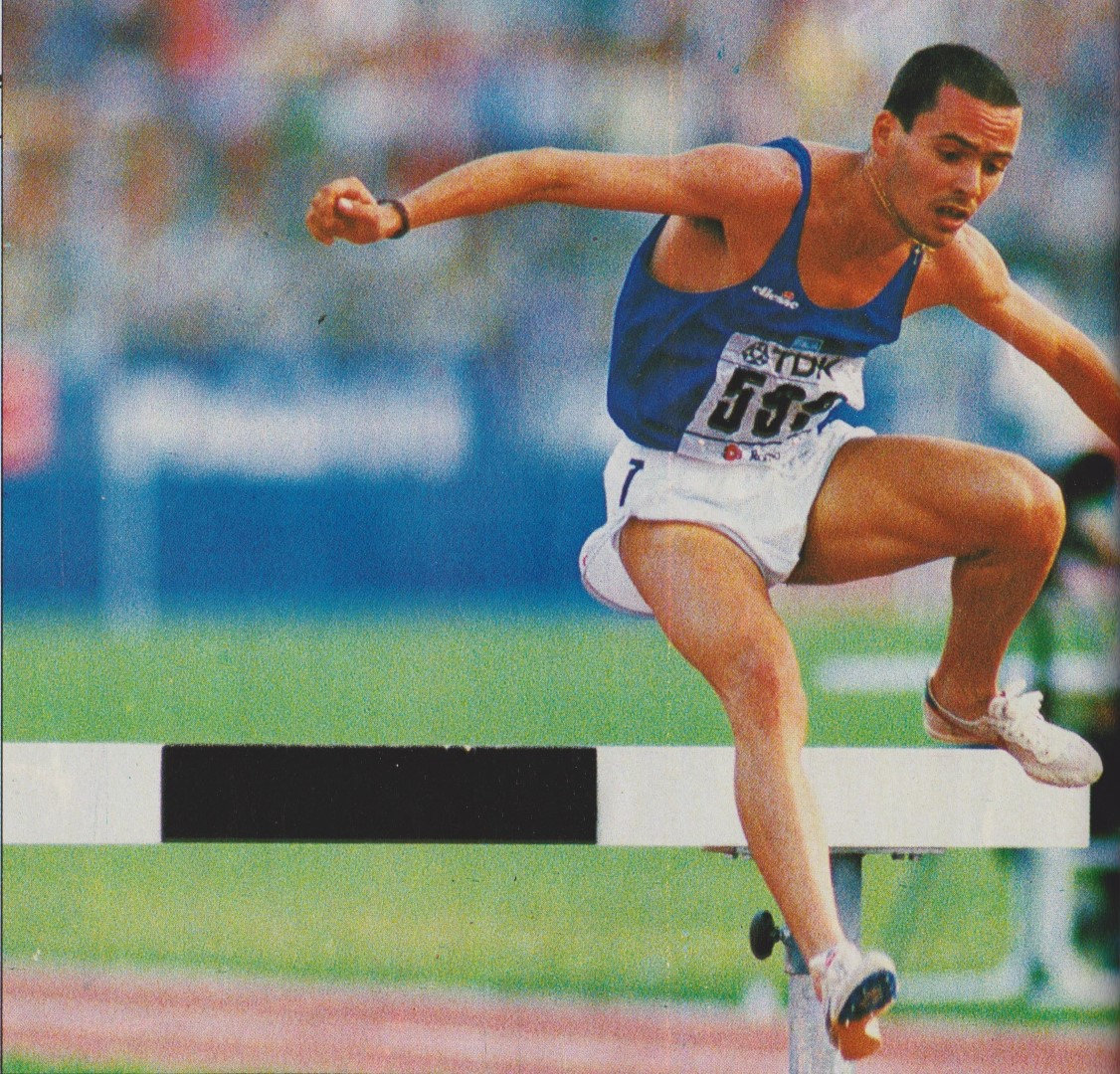
Francesco Panetta one of the most winning champions coached by Giorgio Rondelli.

Below the main athletes trained in the past or present by Giorgio Rondelli.

- Alberto Cova, won a gold medal at the 1984 Summer Olympics and 1983 World Championships
- Francesco Panetta, won a gold medal at the 1987 World Championships and at the 1986 European Championships
- Danilo Goffi
- Abdellah Haidane
- Mario Scapini
- Merihun Crespi
- Giovanna Epis
- Ahmed El Mazoury
