= Ana Subotić =

Serbian long-distance runner

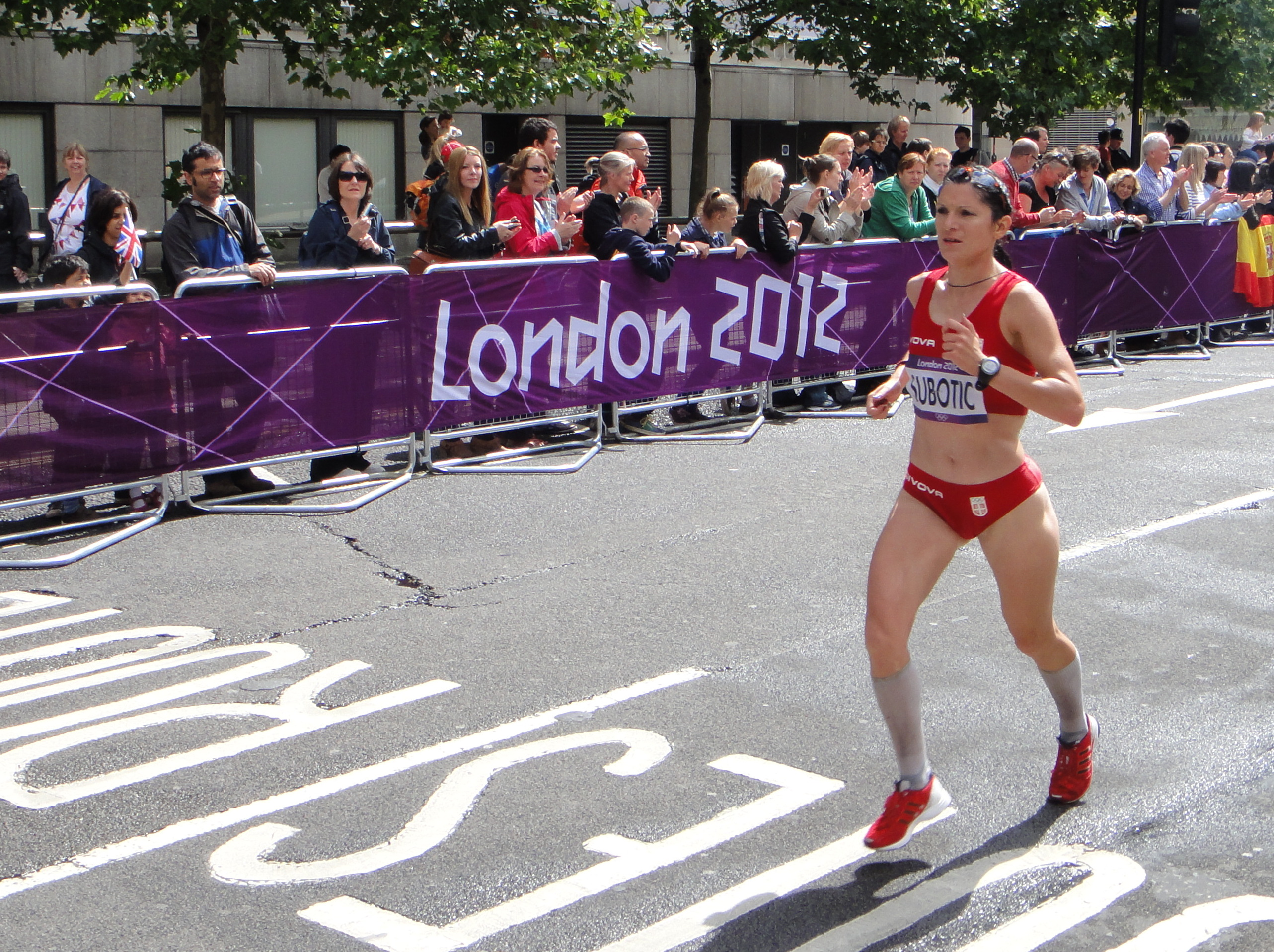
- Subotić at the 2012 Summer Olympics

Personal information
- Nationality: Serbian
- Born: 18 November 1983 (age 42) Valjevo, SR Serbia, SFR Yugoslavia
- Height: 1.71 m (5 ft 7 in)
- Weight: 54 kg (119 lb)

Sport
- Sport: Athletics
- Events: Marathon, 3000 m Steeplechase, 10000 m
- Club: Javor Ivanjica

Achievements and titles
- Personal bests: Marathon: 2:36:14; 3000 m Steeplechase: 10:11.29; 10000 m: 35:47.30

Ana Subotić (Serbian Cyrillic: Ана Суботић, born 18 November 1983) is a Serbian long-distance runner.

== Career ==
Competing throughout most of her professional career under club AK Javor Ivanjica, Subotić is the 2010 and 2011 winner of the Podgorica Marathon, 2011 national champion in 5000 m, 10,000 m and 3000 m Steeplechase. Ana won 7 medals at the Balkan Athletics Championships.

At the 2012 Rotterdam Marathon, she ran her personal best, 2:36:14, qualifying for the 2012 Summer Olympics.

== Personal bests ==
| Event | Performance | Date | Location | Notes |
|---|---|---|---|---|
| 3000 Metres Steeplechase | 10:11.29 | 19 June 2010 | Belgrade, Serbia | |
| 10000 m | 35:47.30 | 6 August 2011 | Kragujevac, Serbia | |
| Marathon | 2:36:14 | 15 April 2012 | Rotterdam, Netherlands | |

== Achievements ==
| Year | Competition | Venue | Position | Notes |
|---|---|---|---|---|
| 2012 | Olympic Games | London, United Kingdom | 71 | 2:38:22 |
