= 2015 Balkan Athletics Championships =

- Dates: 1–2 August
- Host city: Pitești, Romania
- Venue: Stadionul Nicolae Dobrin
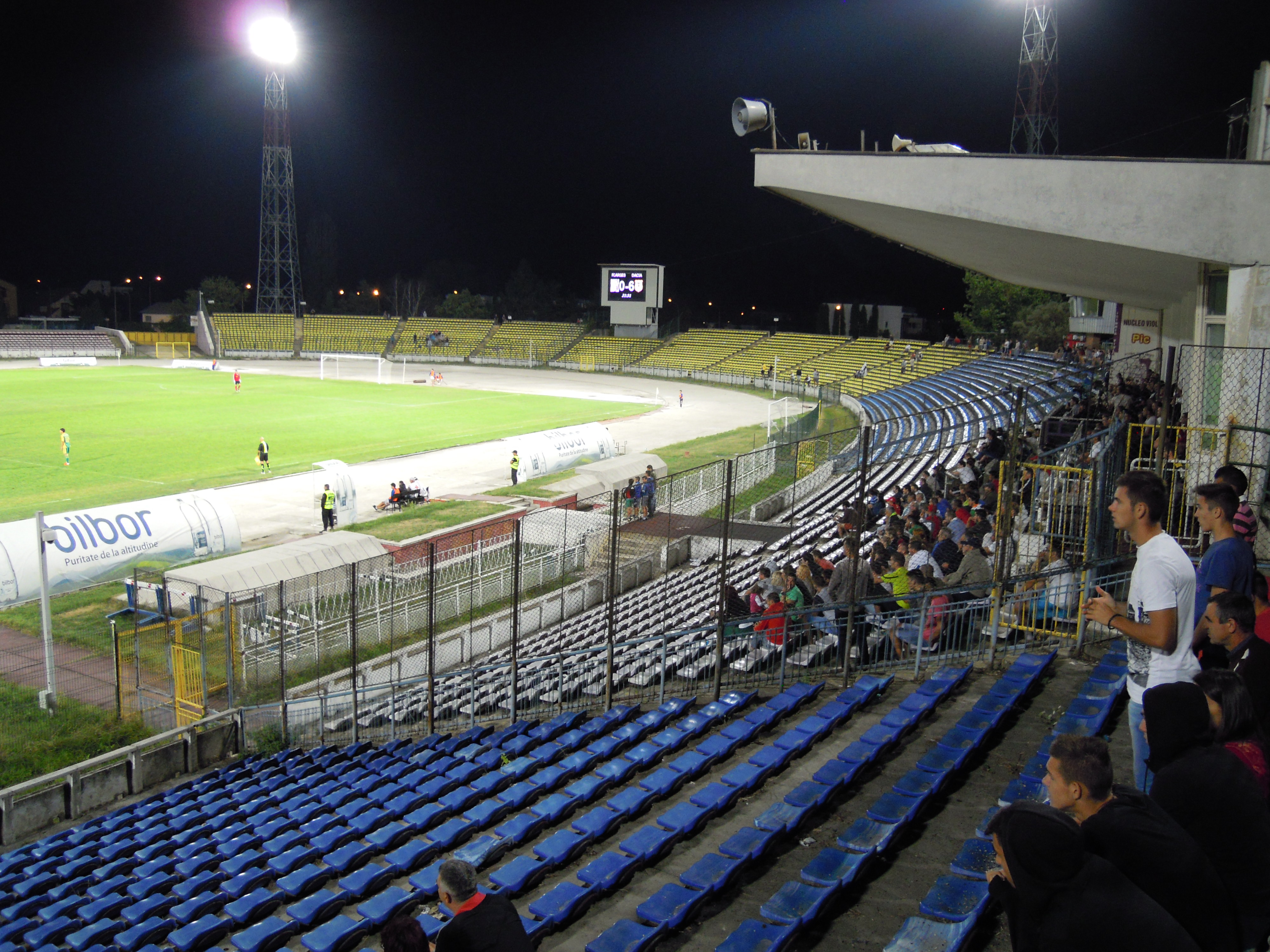
- Level: Senior
- Type: Outdoor
- Events: 40
- Records set: 3 championship records

The 2015 Balkan Athletics Championships was the 74th edition of the annual track and field competition for athletes from the Balkans, organised by Balkan Athletics. It was held at Stadionul Nicolae Dobrin in Pitești, Romania on 1 and 2 August. The host nation Romania won the most medals at the competition, with 28, and the Turkey won the most gold medals, at 10. The competition was originally scheduled to take place in Serres, Greece, but the venue was changed due to a lack of funding, in the context of the Greek government-debt crisis.

On the men's side, three championship records were broken. Jak Ali Harvey of Turkey ran a record of 10.11 seconds to win the 100 metres, Slovenia's Robert Renner cleared 5.65 m to win the pole vault in a Slovenian record, and Andrei Gag set a championship and Romanian record of 20.96 m to win the shot put. The highlight performance of the women's competition was a championship record of 9:33.41 minutes by Silvia Danekova in the 3000 metres steeplechase, which was also a Bulgarian national record.

== Results ==
=== Men ===
Event	Gold		Silver		Bronze	
100 metres	Jak Ali Harvey (TUR)	10.11 CR	Cătălin Cîmpeanu (ROM)	10.37	Ioannis Nyfadopoulos (GRE)	10.46
200 metres	Ramil Guliyev (TUR)	20.59	Cătălin Cîmpeanu (ROM)	21.24	İzzet Safer (TUR)	21.34
400 metres	Luka Janežič (SLO)	46.39	Batuhan Altıntaş (TUR)	46.73	Yavuz Can (TUR)	46.85
800 metres	Žan Rudolf (SLO)	1:50.10	Dušan Babić (BIH)	1:50.99	Cristian Vorovenci (ROU)	1:51.01
1500 metres	Konstadínos Nakópoulos (GRE)	3:48.82	Ioan Zaizan (ROU)	3:48.92	Levent Ateş (TUR)	3:49.16
5000 metres	Dino Bošnjak (CRO)	14:12.20 PB	Yolo Nikolov (BUL)	14:18.63	Cihat Ulus (TUR)	14:20.92
110 m hurdles	Milan Trajkovic (CYP)	14.23	Mustafa Güneş (TUR)	14.27	Cosmin Dumitrache (ROU)	14.57
400 m hurdles	Yasmani Copello (TUR)	50.19	Attila Csongor Nagy (ROM)	51.29	Filip Pestić (CRO)	52.25
3000 m s'chase	Mitko Tsenov (BUL)	8:29.73	Nicolai Gorbusco (MDA)	8:41.36 PB	Osman Junuzović (BIH)	8:50.76 PB
4 × 100 m relay	Turkey; Yiğitcan Hekimoğlu; Ramil Guliyev; İzzet Safer; Jak Ali Harvey	39.35	Romania; Ioan Pițigoi; Cătălin Cîmpeanu; Ionuț Neagoe; Daniel Robert	39.67	Greece; Panayiótis Andreádis; Victor Kremidas; Ioannis Nyfantopoulos; Panayiótis Trivizas	40.29
4 × 400 m relay	Turkey; Halit Kılıç; Yavuz Can; Yasmani Copello; Batuhan Altıntaş	3:06.55	Croatia; Hrvoje Čukman; Željko Vincek; Mateo Kovačić; Mateo Ružić	3:07.62	Romania; Adrian Drăgan; Sebastian Ursachi; Zeno Moraru; Cristian Radu	3:10.38
High jump	Dimitrios Chondrokoukis (CYP)	2.24 m	Tihomir Ivanov (BUL)	2.24 m	Konstadinos Baniotis (GRE)	2.24 m
Pole vault	Robert Renner (SLO)	5.65 m CR NR	Ivan Horvat (CRO)	5.50 m	Andrei Răzvan Deliu (ROU)	5.20 m PB
Long jump	Louis Tsatoumas (GRE)	7.90 m	Denis Eradiri (BUL)	7.72 m	Valentin Toboc (ROU)	7.66 m
Triple jump	Georgi Tsonov (BUL)	17.01 m	Dimitrios Baltadouros (GRE)	16.60 m PB	Rumen Dimitrov (BUL)	16.56 m
Shot put	Andrei Gag (ROU)	20.96 m CR NR	Asmir Kolašinac (SRB)	20.64 m	Georgi Ivanov (BUL)	19.93 m
Discus throw	Filip Mihaljević (CRO)	60.74 m	Alin Alexandru Firfirică (ROU)	59.18 m	Tadej Hribar (SLO)	54.44 m
Hammer throw	Eşref Apak (TUR)	76.82 m	Serghei Marghiev (MDA)	75.83 m	Mihail Anastasakis (GRE)	71.74 m
Javelin throw	Vedran Samac (SRB)	77.92 m	Paraskevás Batzávalis (GRE)	76.72 m	Dejan Mileusnić (BIH)	74.56 m
Decathlon	Mihail Dudaš (SRB)	7720 pts	Panayiotis Mantis (GRE)	6898 pts	Dragan Pešić (MNE)	6497 pts

=== Women ===
Event	Gold		Silver		Bronze	
100 metres	Maja Mihalinec (SLO)	11.34 PB	Ramona Papaioannou (CYP)	11.43	Inna Eftimova (BUL)	11.51
200 metres	Maria Belimpasaki (GRE)	23.23	Ramona Papaioannou (CYP)	23.25	Maja Mihalinec (SLO)	23.28
400 metres	Bianca Răzor (ROU)	52.26	Irini Vasiliou (GRE)	53.58 PB	Kristina Dudek (CRO)	53.98
800 metres	Florina Pierdevară (ROM)	2:03.14	Luiza Gega (ALB)	2:03.45	Mihaela Roxana Nunu (ROM)	2:07.25
1500 metres	Luiza Gega (ALB)	4:08.74	Songül Konak (TUR)	4:16.09 PB	Florina Pierdevară (ROM)	4:18.69
5000 metres	Esma Aydemir (TUR)	15:51.27 PB	Ancuța Bobocel (ROM)	15:56.00 PB	Silvia Danekova (BUL)	16:03.64 PB
100 m hurdles	Andrea Ivančević (CRO)	13.00	Elisavet Pesiridou (GRE)	13.48	Ivana Lončarek (CRO)	13.65
400 m hurdles	Elif Yıldırım (TUR)	57.73	Angela Moroșanu (ROM)	57.88	Sanda Belgyan (ROM)	59.48
3000 m s'chase	Silvia Danekova (BUL)	9:33.41 CR NR	Maruša Mišmaš (SLO)	10:03.83	Elena Adelina Panaet (ROM)	10:06.36
4 × 100 m relay	Croatia; Ivana Lončarek; Lucija Pokos; Kristina Dudek; Mateja Jambrović	45.71	Romania; Ana Maria Roșianu; Andreea Ogrăzeanu; Andreea Grecu; Anamaria Ioniță	45.74	Serbia; Zorana Barjaktarević; Maja Ćirić; Katarina Sirmić; Milana Tirnanić	45.87
4 × 400 m relay	Romania; Sanda Belgyan; Florina Pierdevară; Anamaria Ioniță; Bianca Răzor	3:33.07	Croatia; Mateja Jambrović; Kristina Dudek; Dora Filipović; Anita Banović	3:36.07	Serbia; Katarina Sirmić; Maja Ćirić; Bojana Kalicanin; Tamara Salaški	3:37.90
High jump	Mirela Demireva (BUL)	1.91 m	Venelina Veneva-Mateeva (BUL)	1.87 m	Marija Vuković (MNE)	1.87 m
Pole vault	Tina Šutej (SLO)	4.20 m	Loréla-Anastasía Mánou (GRE)	4.20 m	Lavinia Gabriela Bulov (ROU)	3.90 m
Long jump	Florentina Marincu (ROU)	6.65 m	Haido Alexouli (GRE)	6.29 m	Milena Mitkova (BUL)	6.16 m
Triple jump	Petia Dacheva (BUL)	13.67 m	Cristina Bujin (ROM)	13.64 m	Elena Panțuroiu (ROM)	13.62 m
Shot put	Emel Dereli (TUR)	17.39 m	Radoslava Mavrodieva (BUL)	16.85 m	Andreea Huzum-Vitan (ROU)	15.52 m
Discus throw	Chrysoula Anagnostopoulou (GRE)	54.87 m	Veronika Domjan (SLO)	53.74 m	Natalia Stratulat (MDA)	52.82 m
Hammer throw	Zalina Marghieva (MDA)	73.97 m	Kıvılcım Kaya (TUR)	71.04 m PB	Marina Marghieva (MDA)	69.38 m
Javelin throw	Martina Ratej (SLO)	59.19 m	Marija Vučenović (SRB)	53.91 m	Nicoleta Anghelescu (ROU)	51.18 m
Heptathlon	Serpil Koçak (TUR)	5119 pts	Stylani Tzikanoula (GRE)	4982 pts	Mladena Petrusic (BIH)	4831 pts PB

- Israel's Maayan Furman-Shahaf cleared 1.87 m in the women's high jump but was not included in the medals tally as her country was not a member of Balkan Athletics.

== Medal table ==
* Host nation (Romania)

Rank	Nation	Gold	Silver	Bronze	Total
1	Turkey	10	4	4	18
2	Slovenia	6	2	2	10
3	Romania*	5	10	13	28
4	Bulgaria	5	5	5	15
5	Greece	4	8	4	16
6	Croatia	4	3	3	10
7	Serbia	2	2	2	6
8	Cyprus	2	2	0	4
9	Moldova	1	2	2	5
10	Albania	1	1	0	2
11	Bosnia and Herzegovina	0	1	3	4
12	Montenegro	0	0	2	2
Totals (12 entries)		40	40	40	120
