= 2013 Balkan Athletics Championships =

- Dates: 27–28 July
- Host city: Stara Zagora, Bulgaria
- Venue: Beroe Stadium
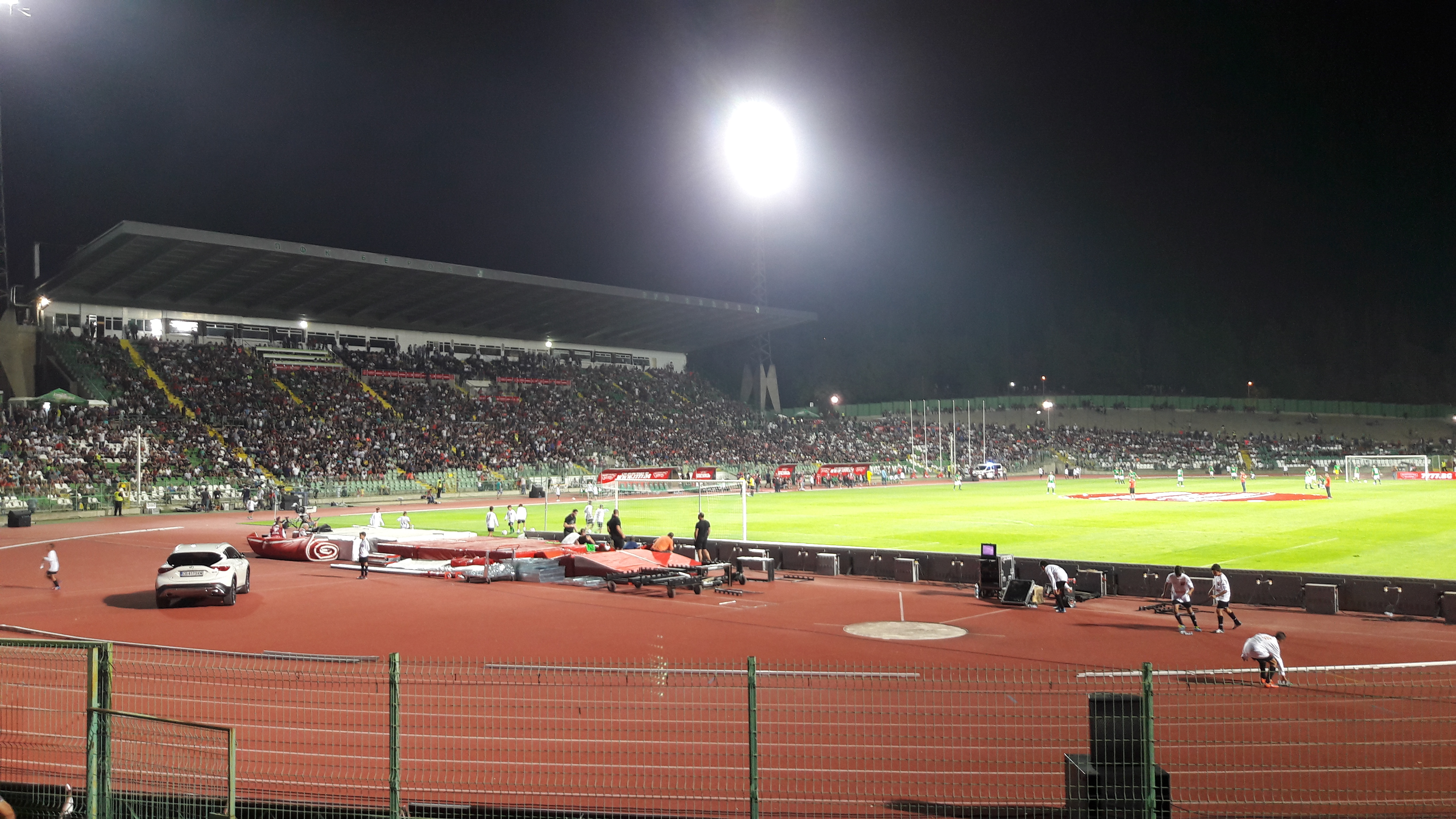
- Level: Senior
- Type: Outdoor
- Events: 40

The 2013 Balkan Athletics Championships was the 66th edition of the annual track and field competition for athletes from the Balkans, organised by Balkan Athletics. It was held at Beroe Stadium in Stara Zagora, Bulgaria on 27 and 28 July. Romania topped the medal table with eleven gold medals among a total haul of 26. The host nation Bulgaria had the second highest number of gold medals, with nine in a total of 21, while Turkey had the second highest medal total with 23. Turkey won the men's side of the competition while Romania won the women's side.

Amela Terzić of Serbia was the only athlete to win multiple individual events, taking the women's 1500 metres and 3000 metres titles. Bulgaria's Ivet Lalova and Romania's Adelina Pastor took gold for their countries in both individual and relay events over 100 metres and 400 metres, respectively. The other multiple individual medallists were Turkey's Elif Karabulut (twice runner-up behind Terzić), sprint and hurdles medalist Vania Stambolova.

== Results ==
=== Men ===
Event	Gold		Silver		Bronze	
100 metres	Denis Dimitrov (BUL)	10.32	Hrístos Kalamarás (GRE)	10.54	Umutcan Emektaş (TUR)	10.56
200 metres	Petar Kremenski (BUL)	20.79	Mihaíl Dardaneliótis (GRE)	21.50	Zvonimir Ivašković (CRO)	21.58
400 metres	Yavuz Can (TUR)	46.66	Mateo Ružić (CRO)	47.38	Tiberiu Alexandru Baneasu (ROM)	48.06
800 metres	Konstadínos Nakópoulos (GRE)	1:49.93	Valentin Voicu (ROM)	1:50.70	Amel Tuka (BIH)	1:50.76
1500 metres	Ioan Zaizan (ROM)	3:44.60	Goran Nava (SRB)	3:44.89	Süleyman Bekmezci (TUR)	3:45.19
3000 metres	Jasmin Ljajić (SRB)	8:12.36 PB	Cihat Ulus (TUR)	8:13.53 PB	Andrei Cristian Stefana (ROM)	8:13.73 PB
5000 metres	Dino Bošnjak (CRO)	14:36.96	Mirko Petrović (SRB)	14:38.02	Ramazan Özdemir (TUR)	14:39.65 PB
3000 m s'chase	Mitko Tsenov (BUL)	8:46.69	Halil Akkaş (TUR)	8:55.33	Daniel Ionut Betej (ROM)	9:00.89
110 m hurdles	Konstadinos Douvalidis (GRE)	13.44	Martin Arnaudov (BUL)	13.93	Theópistos Mavrídis (GRE)	13.93
400 m hurdles	Emir Bekrić (SRB)	48.96	Alexei Cravcenco (MDA)	51.49	Attila Nagy (ROM)	51.63
4 × 100 m relay	Romania (ROM); Bogdan Madaras; Doru Teofilescu; Alexandru Terpezanu; Paul Ceici	40.03	Bulgaria (BUL); Ognian Ognianov; Bojan Petrov; Petar Kremenski; Denis Dimitrov	40.23	Croatia (CRO); Andrej Doricić; Tomislav Kašnar; Zvonimir Ivašković; Luka Šakota	40.28
4 × 400 m relay	Croatia (CRO); Josip Šakić; Rudolf Kralj; Željko Vincek; Mateo Ružić	3:08.66	Serbia (SRB); Goran Podunavac; Miloš Raović; Ivan Marković; Emir Bekrić	3:10.63	Turkey (TUR); Doruk Uğurer; Batuhan Altıntaş; Buğrahan Kocabeyoğlu; Mehmet Güzel	3:11.99
High jump	Mihai Donisan (ROM)	2.31 m PB	Viktor Ninov (BUL)	2.24 m	Marius Dumitrache (ROM)	2.15 m
Pole vault	Panayiótis Láskaris (GRE)	5.40 m	Ivan Horvat (CRO)	5.20 m	Dimitrios Patsoukakis (GRE)	5.20 m
Long jump	Alper Kulaksız (TUR)	7.86 m w	Denis Eradiri (BUL)	7.79 m	Dino Pervan (CRO)	7.75 m
Triple jump	Marian Oprea (ROM)	17.24 m	Zlatozar Atanasov (BUL)	16.65 m	Aşkin Karaca (TUR)	16.51 m PB
Shot put	Georgi Ivanov (BUL)	20.71 m	Asmir Kolašinac (SRB)	20.59 m	Michalis Stamatogiannis (GRE)	19.02 m
Discus throw	Irfan Yıldırım (TUR)	63.01 m	Sergiu Ursu (ROM)	62.78 m	Andrei Gag (ROM)	57.47 m
Hammer throw	Serghei Marghiev (MDA)	73.77 m	Özkan Baltacı (TUR)	70.41 m PB	Mirko Mičuda (CRO)	69.59 m
Javelin throw	Dejan Mileusnić (BIH)	76.34 m	Konstadínos Vertoúdos (GRE)	71.30 m	Aykut Tanrıverdi (TUR)	69.10 m

=== Women ===
Event	Gold		Silver		Bronze	
100 metres	Ivet Lalova (BUL)	11.15	Grigoría-Emmanouéla Keramidá (GRE)	11.73 PB	Ana Maria Rosianu (ROM)	11.90
200 metres	Grigoría-Emmanouéla Keramidá (GRE)	23.68	Gabriela Laleva (BUL)	23.91	Alina Andreea Panainte (ROM)	24.07
400 metres	Adelina Pastor (ROM)	52.76	Olesea Cojuhari (MDA)	53.01	Vania Stambolova (BUL)	53.70
800 metres	Dorina Korozsi (ROM)	2:05.60	Teodora Kolarova (BUL)	2:05.62	María Kládou (GRE)	2:08.78
1500 metres	Amela Terzić (SRB)	4:16.27	Elif Karabulut (TUR)	4:16.68 PB	Biljana Cvijanović (BIH)	4:17.43 PB
3000 metres	Amela Terzić (SRB)	9:18.60	Elif Karabulut (TUR)	9:22.12 PB	Slađana Perunović (MNE)	9:24.69 NR
5000 metres	Roxana Bârcă (ROM)	15:40.61	Sonja Stolić (SRB)	16:30.48	Emine Hatun Tuna (TUR)	16:31.21
3000 m s'chase	Silvia Danekova (BUL)	9:43.81	Türkan Erişmiş (TUR)	10:04.77	María Pardaloú (GRE)	10:06.38
100 m hurdles	Olibía Petsoúdi (GRE)	13.55	Andreea Ionescu (CRO)	13.68	Beatrice Puiu (ROM)	13.78
400 m hurdles	Vania Stambolova (BUL)	56.21	Sanda Belgyan (ROM)	58.13 PB	Özge Akın (TUR)	59.55
4 × 100 metres relay	Bulgaria (BUL); Marija Dankova; Gabriela Laleva; Galina Nikolova; Ivet Lalova	45.41	Turkey (TUR); Aksel Gürcan Demirtaş; Birsen Engin; Saliha Özyurt; Sema Apak	46.19	Croatia (CRO); Nika Župa; Anita Banović; Marina Banović; Ivana Lončarek	46.63
4 × 400 metres relay	Romania (ROM); Alina Andreea Panainte; Adelina Pastor; Sandra Belgyan; Bianca Răzor	3:29.13	Croatia (CRO); Anamarija Petters; Marija Hižman; Kristina Dudek; Anita Banović	3:38.49	Turkey (TUR); Özge Akın; Emel Şanlı; Sema Apak; Birsen Engin	3:38.97
High jump	Antonia Stergiou (GRE)	1.95 m	Mirela Demireva (BUL)	1.92 m	Ana Šimić (CRO)	1.88 m
Pole vault	Lorela Manu (GRE)	4.45 m PB=	Jelena Radinovič-Vasič (SRB)	4.00 m	Buse Arıkazan (TUR)	3.80 m
Long jump	Ivana Španović (SRB)	6.76 m	Cristina Sandu (ROM)	6.51 m	Alina Rotaru (ROM)	6.50 m
Triple jump	Carmen Toma (ROM)	14.56w m	Gabriela Petrova (BUL)	13.92 m PB	Gita Dodova (BUL)	13.67 m
Shot put	Radoslava Mavrodieva (BUL)	18.08 m	Emel Dereli (TUR)	16.02 m	Evaggelía Sofáni (GRE)	15.21 m
Discus throw	Nicoleta Grasu (ROM)	56.05 m	Chrysoula Anagnostopoulou (GRE)	53.81 m	Elçin Kaya (TUR)	50.80 m
Hammer throw	Bianca Perie (ROM)	68.76 m	Agápi Proskinitopoúlou (GRE)	60.63 m	Ayşegül Alnıaçık (TUR)	59.29 m
Javelin throw	Tatjana Jelača (SRB)	56.54 m	Nicoleta Madalina Anghelescu (ROM)	55.43 m	Christina Georgieva (BUL)	47.93 m

== Medal table ==
* Host nation (Bulgaria)

Rank	Nation	Gold	Silver	Bronze	Total
1	Romania	11	5	10	26
2	Bulgaria*	9	9	3	21
3	Greece	7	6	6	19
4	Serbia	6	6	0	12
5	Turkey	3	8	12	23
6	Croatia	2	4	6	12
7	Moldova	1	2	0	3
8	Bosnia and Herzegovina	1	0	2	3
9	Montenegro	0	0	1	1
Totals (9 entries)		40	40	40	120
