= Alina Panainte =

Romanian sprinter (born 1988)

Personal information
- Born: Alina Andreea Panainte; 7 November 1988 (37 years, 268 days old)
- Spouse: Ioan Zaizan

Sport
- Country: Romania
- Sport: Sport of athletics
- Event: 400 metres
- Club: CSU Brașov; CSM Bacău 2010

Achievements and titles
- National finals: 2008 Romanian U23s; • 100m, 5th; • 200m, 5th; 2009 Romanian Indoors; • 60m, 4th; 2009 Romanian Champs; • 100m, 3rd (bronze); • 200m, 3rd (bronze); 2010 Romanian Indoors; • 60m, 3rd (bronze); 2010 Romanian Champs; • 100m, 2nd (silver); • 200m, 5th; 2011 Romanian Champs; • 400m, 3rd (bronze); • 200m, 2nd (silver); 2012 Romanian Indoors; • 400m, 2nd (silver); 2012 Romanian Champs; • 400m, 4th; • 200m, 3rd (bronze); 2014 Romanian Champs; • 400m, 5th; • 200m, 3rd (bronze); 2015 Romanian Champs; • 100m, 5th; • 200m, 6th
- Personal bests: 400m: 52.49 (2012); 200m: 23.80 (+0.1) (2012); 800m: 2:09.42 (2012)
Medal record
Women's athletics
Representing Romaniay
World Indoor Championships
Bronze medal – third place	2012 Istanbul	4 × 400 m relay
Balkan Championships
Bronze medal – third place	2011 Silven	100 m
Bronze medal – third place	2011 Silven	4 × 100 m
Gold medal – first place	2011 Silven	4 × 400 m
Gold medal – first place	2012 Eskişehir	200 m
Gold medal – first place	2012 Eskişehir	4 × 400 m
Bronze medal – third place	2012 Eskişehir	4 × 100 m
Bronze medal – third place	2013 Stara Zagora	200 m
Gold medal – first place	2013 Stara Zagora	4 × 400 m
Balkan Indoor Championships
Gold medal – first place	2012 Istanbul	4 × 400 m
Bronze medal – third place	2012 Istanbul	400 m
- Updated on November 2024

Alina Andreea Zaizan (née Panainte; born 7 November 1988) is a Romanian former sprinter specializing in the 400 metres and the 2012 World Athletics Indoor Championships bronze medalist in the 4 × 400 m relay. Her team originally crossed the line in 5th, but Ukraine and Russia were both later disqualified, giving Romania its second-ever World Indoor women's 4 × 400 m medal. She was also a ten-time Balkan Athletics Championships and Balkan Indoor Athletics Championships medallist in multiple sprinting disciplines.

== Career ==
Panainte had early success in national age group competitions, placing 5th at the 2008 Romanian U23 Championships in the 100 m and 200 m. After improving to 4th in the 60 m at her first senior Romanian Indoor Championships in 2009, she made the podium in the 100 m and 200 m at the 2009 senior Romanian Athletics Championships, placing 3rd in both events.

Panainte again placed 3rd, 2nd, and 5th in the 60 m, 100 m, and 200 m at the 2010 Romanian indoor and outdoor championships, but it wasn't until 2011 that Panainte qualified for her first international teams. At the 2011 European Team Championships First League, she placed 6th in the 4 × 100 m, and then she was entered in three events at the 2011 Balkan Athletics Championships. Running the 100 m, 4 × 100 m, and 4 × 400 m, Panainte won medals in all three disciplines, including bronze in the 100 m and 4 × 100 m and gold in the 4 × 400 m. Panainte anchored both relays, and later came back to place runner-up and 3rd in the 200 m and 400 m respectively at the Romanian Championships.

Panainte finished runner-up in the 400 m at the 2012 Romanian Indoor Championships and won two more medals (bronze in 400 m and gold in 4 × 400 m) at the 2012 Balkan Indoor Athletics Championships, qualifying her to represent Romania at the 2012 IAAF World Indoor Championships in the 4 × 400 m. Running second leg, Panainte helped the Romanian team to a bronze medal. Romania actually originally crossed the line in 5th place, but two of the teams ahead of them were disqualified. Original fourth-placer Ukraine was immediately disqualified for their first runner knocking over a Belarusian runner, and Russia (originally 3rd) was later disqualified for doping by their leadoff runner Yuliya Gushchina. Outdoors, Panainte ran in the 2012 European Athletics Championships heats of the 4 × 400 m, but she was replaced in the finals by Sanda Belgyan and the Romanian team finished 7th. After 1st and 4th-place finishes in the 200 m and 400 m at the Romanian Athletics Championships, Panainte won the 200 m and 4 × 100 m at the 2012 Balkan Athletics Championships and won a bronze medal in the 4 × 100 m.

At the 2013 Romanian Indoor Championships, Panainte placed 4th in the 400 m, but she nonetheless qualified for the 2013 European Indoor 400 m where she placed 4th in her heat. Outdoors, she placed 5th in the 2013 European Team Championships First League 4 × 400 m before competing in three championship events at the 2013 Balkan Athletics Championships. In the 200 m, Panainte won bronze, while her Romanian 4 × 400 m team won gold and her 4 × 100 m team finished 6th. Panainte also qualified for her first outdoor World Athletics Championships later that year in the 4 × 400 m, helping Romania qualify for the finals by leading off in the heats. She was replaced by Mirela Lavric in the finals before the team finished 6th.

Panainte competed at her second World Indoor Championships 4 × 400 m in 2014, failing to qualify for the finals. She won the 2014 European Team Championships First League 4 × 400 m before placing 3rd and 5th in the 200 m and 400 m at outdoor nationals.

Panainte contested her last national championships in 2015, placing 6th in the indoor 400 m, 5th in the outdoor 100 m, and 6th in the outdoor 200 m. She continued to participate in lower-level competitions until 2016.

== Personal life ==
Panainte was born on 7 November 1988. She first trained with the athletics division of CSU Brașov in Brașov, Romania and then joined the CSM Bacău 2010 athletics club.

Before the 2014 athletics season started, Panainte married Romanian middle-distance runner Ioan Zaizan.

== Statistics ==
=== Personal best progression ===
400m progression
#	Mark	Pl.	Competition	Venue	Date	Ref.
1	55.71	4th		Bucureşti, Romania	19 May 2011	
2	55.44	3rd place, bronze medalist(s)	Romanian International Championships	Constanta, Romania	2 Jun 2011	
3	54.09	3rd place, bronze medalist(s)	Romanian Athletics Championships	Bucureşti, Romania	8 Aug 2011	
4	53.92	1st place, gold medalist(s)		Bucureşti, Romania	24 May 2012	
5	52.49	1st place, gold medalist(s)	Campionatele Internationale de Atletism Stadionul Dinamo	Bucureşti, Romania	7 Jun 2012	
