= 2014 Balkan Athletics Championships =

- Dates: 26–27 July
- Host city: Pitești, Romania
- Venue: Stadionul Nicolae Dobrin
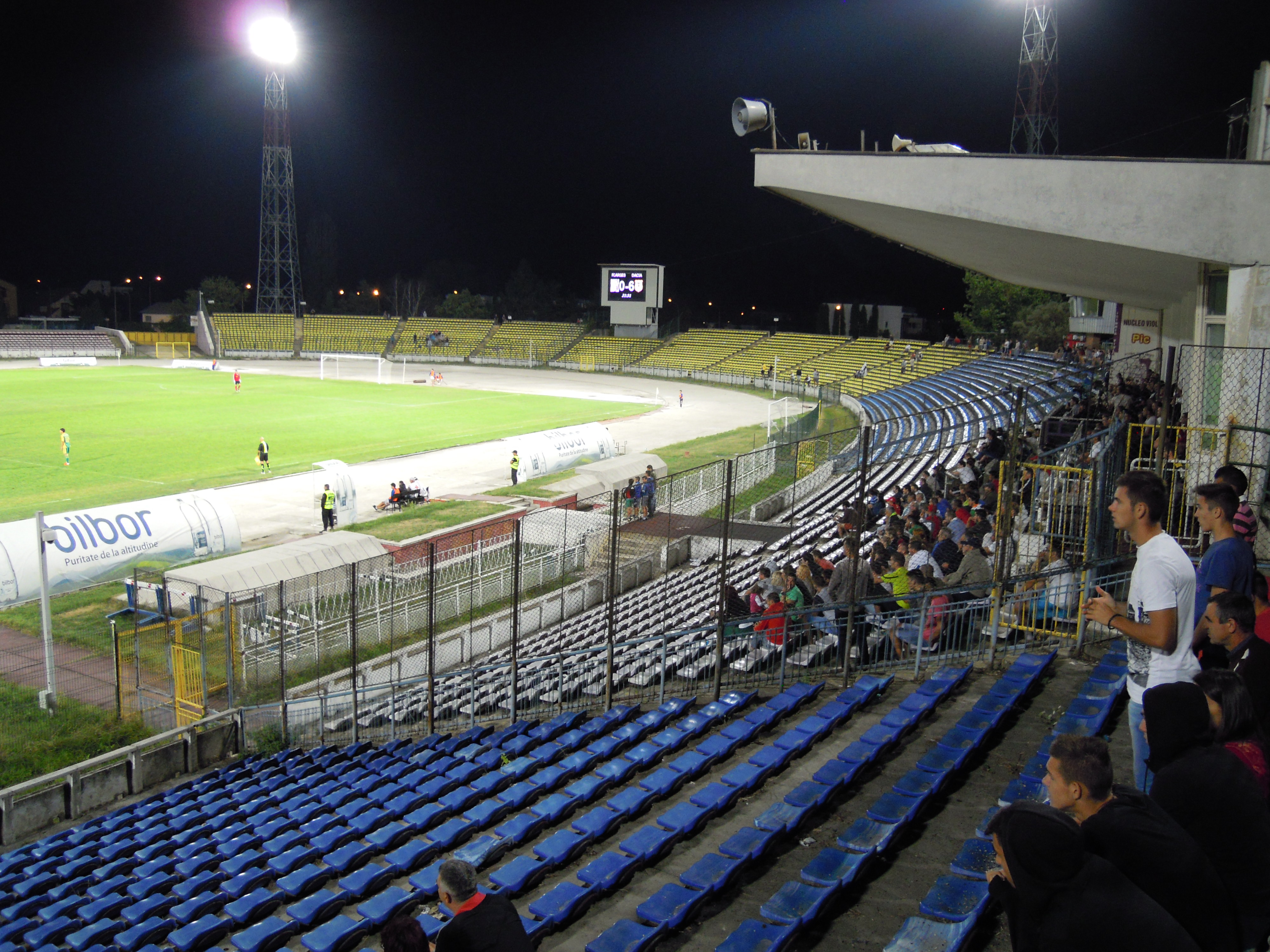
- Level: Senior
- Type: Outdoor
- Events: 40

The 2014 Balkan Athletics Championships was the 67th edition of the annual track and field competition for athletes from the Balkans, organised by Balkan Athletics. It was held at Stadionul Nicolae Dobrin in Pitești, Romania on 26 and 27 July. The host nation Romania topped the medal table with fourteen gold medals among a total haul of 32. Turkey and Bulgaria each won seven gold medals.

Athletes' performances were assessed with a points ranking based on international standards in the given event. Romanian long jumper Alina Rotaru gave the best overall performance with 6.72 m for 1143 points and her countryman Marian Oprea gave the best men's performance with 16.77 m for 1130 points in the triple jump.

Turkey's Ramil Guliyev won a double in the men's short sprints and Marian Oprea was the victor in both men's horizontal jumps. The individual 400 metres champions, Yavuz Can and Bianca Răzor, both anchored their national teams to a second gold in the 4 × 400 metres relay. Bulgaria's Inna Eftimova fell just short of a women's short sprint double, winning the 200 metres and taking silver in the 100 metres. Bulgarian jumper Andriana Bânova and Moldovan thrower Dimitriana Surdu each won multiple individual medals.

== Results ==
=== Men ===
Event	Gold		Silver		Bronze	
100 metres	Ramil Guliyev (TUR)	10.24	Cătălin Cîmpeanu (ROU)	10.35	İzzet Safer (TUR)	10.42
200 metres	Ramil Guliyev (TUR)	21.04	İzzet Safer (TUR)	21.53	Alexandru Terpezan (ROU)	21.58
400 metres	Yavuz Can (TUR)	46.50	Željko Vincek (CRO)	47.36	Mateo Ružić (CRO)	47.41
800 metres	Andreas Dimitrakis (GRE)	1:49.74	Hasan Basri Güdük (TUR)	1:50.10	Amel Tuka (BIH)	1:50.67
1500 metres	Kemal Koyuncu (TUR)	3:45.80	Levent Ateş (TUR)	3:46.63	Andreas Dimitrakis (GRE)	3:46.74
5000 metres	Nicolae Soare (ROU)	14:17.95	Yolo Nikolov (BUL)	14:23.54	Dino Bošnjak (CRO)	14:26.10
110 m hurdles	Milan Ristić (SRB)	14.47	David Ilariani (GEO)	14.72	Mustafa Gunes (TUR)	15.03
400 m hurdles	Emir Bekrić (SRB)	50.08	Yasmani Copello (TUR)	50.62	Milan Kotur (CRO)	51.87
3000 m s'chase	Mitko Tsenov (BUL)	8:52.33	Alexandru Ghinea (ROU)	8:58.08	Nicolai Gorbusco (MDA)	8:59.77
4 × 100 m relay	Romania; Stefan-Alexandru Codreanu; Teofilescu Doru Alexandru; Alexandru Terpezan; Cătălin Cîmpeanu	40.09	Serbia; Milan Ristić; Goran Podunavac; Nemanja Bozic; Strahinja Jovančević	41.38	Greece; Vasileios Tsaousis; Nikolaos Saisanas; Ioannis Nyfantopoulos; Michael Mertzanidis	42.28
4 × 400 m relay	Turkey; Yasmani Copello; Halit Kiliç; Mehmet Güzel; Yavuz Can	3:07.41	Croatia; Zvonimir Ivaškovic; Staša Vrhovec; Željko Vincek; Mateo Ružić	3:09.31	Romania; Alin George Costache; Ionut Danila; Attila Csongor Nagy; Tiberiu Alexandru Baneasu	3:10.93
High jump	Tikhomir Ivanov (BUL)	2.22 m	Mihai Donisan (ROU)	2.22 m	Viktor Ninov (BUL)	2.14 m
Pole vault	Ivan Horvat (CRO)	5.30 m	Thodoris Chrysanthopoulos (GRE)	5.10 m	Andrej Poljanec (SLO)	5.10 m
Long jump	Marian Oprea (ROU)	7.78 m	Denis Eradiri (BUL)	7.71 m	Alper Kulaksız (TUR)	7.66 m
Triple jump	Marian Oprea (ROU)	16.77 m	Rumen Dimitrov (BUL)	16.62 m	Vladimir Letnicov (MDA)	16.54 m
Shot put	Georgi Ivanov (BUL)	19.62 m	Hamza Alić (BIH)	19.13 m	Kemal Mešić (BIH)	18.94 m
Discus throw	Martin Marić (CRO)	62.91 m	Danijel Furtula (MNE)	61.48 m	Mihai Grasu (ROU)	59.09 m
Hammer throw	Serghei Marghiev (MDA)	76.20 m	Özkan Baltacı (TUR)	69.67 m	Konstantinos Kostoglidis (GRE)	68.52 m
Javelin throw	Fatih Avan (TUR)	75.98 m	Georgios Iltsios (GRE)	71.83 m	Vedran Samac (SRB)	69.25 m
Decathlon	Darko Pešić (MNE)	7259 pts	Dragan Pešić (MNE)	6951 pts	Razvan George Roman (ROU)	6867 pts

=== Women ===
Event	Gold		Silver		Bronze	
100 metres	Andreea Ogrăzeanu (ROU)	11.33	Inna Eftimova (BUL)	11.44	Maria Gatou (GRE)	11.48
200 metres	Inna Eftimova (BUL)	23.99	Andriana Ferra (GRE)	24.06	Lucija Pokos (CRO)	24.09
400 metres	Bianca Răzor (ROU)	52.24	Adelina Pastor (ROU)	53.52	Anita Banović (CRO)	53.84
800 metres	Mirela Lavric (ROU)	2:04.21	Mihaela Roxana Nunu (ROU)	2:04.69	Olga Zaporojan (MDA)	2:07.20
1500 metres	Florina Pierdevară (ROU)	4:24.95	Claudia Bobocea (ROU)	4:26.01	Silvia Danekova (BUL)	4:26.54
5000 metres	Esma Aydemir (TUR)	15:58.25	Monica Mădălina Florea (ROU)	16:01.13	Sonja Roman (SLO)	16:06.09
100 m hurdles	Ivana Lončarek (CRO)	13.37	Maria Pinni (GRE)	13.53	Elisavet Pesiridou (GRE)	13.82
400 m hurdles	Angela Moroșanu (ROU)	57.43	Sanda Belgyan (ROU)	59.34	Emel Şanlı (TUR)	59.68
3000 m s'chase	Silvia Danekova (BUL)	9:43.45	Özlem Kaya (TUR)	9:47.34	Cristina Casandra (ROU)	9:51.40
4 × 100 m relay	Greece; Andriana Ferra; Georgia Kokloni; Maria Gatou; Elisavet Pesiridou	44.76	Romania; Ana Maria Roșianu; Angela Moroșanu; Andreea Grecu; Andreea Ogrăzeanu	45.54	Croatia; Ivana Lončarek; Lucija Pokos; Mateja Jambrovic; Nika Župa	45.65
4 × 400 m relay	Romania; Adelina Pastor; Mirela Lavric; Angela Moroșanu; Bianca Răzor	3:31.02	Croatia; Marija Hižman; Anita Banović; Marina Banović; Kristina Dudek	3:37.67	Serbia; Katarina Ilic; Jelena Grujic; Bojana Kaličanin; Tamara Markovic	3:39.93
High jump	Venelina Veneva-Mateeva (BUL)	1.90 m	Mirela Demireva (BUL)	1.87 m	Burcu Yüksel (TUR)	1.83 m
Pole vault	Lorella Manou (GRE)	4.35 m	Buse Arikzan (TUR)	3.60 m	Mateja Drobnič (SLO)	3.50 m
Long jump	Alina Rotaru (ROU)	6.72 m	Cornelia Deiac (ROU)	6.42 m	Andriana Bânova (BUL)	6.22 m
Triple jump	Cristina Bujin (ROU)	14.11 m	Andriana Bânova (BUL)	13.74 m	Cristina Mihaela Sandu (ROU)	13.67 m
Shot put	Radoslava Mavrodieva (BUL)	17.60 m	Andreea Huzum-Vitan (ROU)	15.47 m	Dimitriana Surdu (MDA)	14.30 m
Discus throw	Dragana Tomašević (SRB)	57.60 m	Chrysoula Anagnostopoulou (GRE)	53.38 m	Dimitriana Surdu (MDA)	50.17 m
Hammer throw	Bianca Perie-Ghelber (ROU)	69.42 m	Marina Nichișenco (MDA)	60.68 m	Sara Savatović (SRB)	57.03 m
Javelin throw	Mădălina-Nicoleta Anghelescu (ROU)	53.12 m	Katarina Gašparovič (CRO)	49.25 m	Selena Durna (TUR)	45.78 m
Heptathlon	Sofia Yfantidou (GRE)	5724 pts	Beatrice Puiu (ROU)	5624 pts	Serpil Koçak (TUR)	5260 pts

== Medal table ==
* Host nation (Romania)

Rank	Nation	Gold	Silver	Bronze	Total
1	Romania*	14	12	6	32
2	Turkey	7	7	7	21
3	Bulgaria	7	6	3	16
4	Greece	4	5	5	14
5	Croatia	3	4	6	13
6	Serbia	3	1	3	7
7	Montenegro	1	2	0	3
8	Moldova	1	1	5	7
9	Bosnia and Herzegovina	0	1	2	3
10	Georgia	0	1	0	1
11	Slovenia	0	0	3	3
Totals (11 entries)		40	40	40	120
