= 2012 Balkan Athletics Indoor Championships =

- Dates: 18 February
- Host city: Istanbul, Turkey
- Venue: Ataköy Athletics Arena
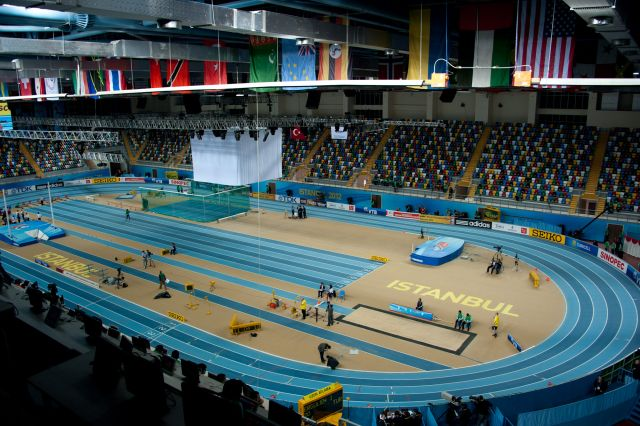
- Events: 24

The 2012 Balkan Athletics Indoor Championships was the 17th edition of the annual indoor track and field competition for athletes from the Balkans, organised by Balkan Athletics. It was held on 18 February at the Ataköy Athletics Arena in Istanbul, Turkey. The competition was the first international event to be hosted at the newly-constructed Ataköy Athletics Arena, following the Turkish Indoor Athletics Championships in January and preceding the 2012 IAAF World Indoor Championships held in March. It also marked the re-launch of the Balkan Indoor Championships under the aegis of Turkey – the Hellenic Amateur Athletic Association had organised the event up to 2009 but the 2010 and 2011 championships were cancelled due to funding issues stemming from the Greek government-debt crisis.

== Results ==
=== Men ===
Event	Gold		Silver		Bronze	
60 metres	Lykourgos-Stefanos Tsakonas (GRE)	6.78	Georgi Georgiev (BUL)	6.87	Darko Šarović (SRB)	6.90
400 metres	Yavuz Can (TUR)	47.22 PB	Mateo Ružić (CRO)	47.77 PB	Cătălin Cîmpeanu (ROU)	47.95
800 metres	Halit Kiliç (TUR)	1:50.72	Ioan Zaizan (ROU)	1:51.43	Emrah Çoban (TUR)	1:51.63
1500 metres	Andréas Dimitrákis (GRE)	3:47.74 PB	Kemal Koyuncu (TUR)	3:52.32	Levent Ateş (TUR)	3:53.27
3000 metres	Polat Kemboi Arıkan (TUR)	7:42.49 NR	İlham Tanui Özbilen (TUR)	7:50.61 PB	Tarık Langat Akdağ (TUR)	8:02.62
60 m hurdles	Konstadinos Douvalidis (GRE)	7.82	Martin Arnaudov (BUL)	7.96	Mustafa Güneş (TUR)	8.06 PB
4 × 400 m relay	Turkey (TUR); Ali Ekber Kayaş; Yavuz Can; Mehmet Güzel; Serdar Tamaç	3:14.39	Romania (ROU); Iulian Geambazu; Doru Teofilescu; Ioan Zaizan; Adrian Drăgan	3:18.37		
High jump	Dimitrios Chondrokoukis (GRE)	2.26 m	Viktor Ninov (BUL)	2.21 m	Alexandru Tufă (ROU)	2.18 m
Pole vault	Konstantinos Filippidis (GRE)	5.75 NR	Spas Bukhalov (BUL)	5.20 m	Levente Kecskes (ROU)	4.60 m
Long jump	Louis Tsatoumas (GRE)	8.04 m	Yeóryios Tsákonas (GRE)	7.88 m	Dimítrios Diamadáras (GRE)	7.80 m
Triple jump	Dimitrios Tsiamis (GRE)	16.45 m	Marian Oprea (ROU)	16.43 m	Vladimir Letnicov (MDA)	16.38 m
Shot put	Asmir Kolašinac (SRB)	20.05 m	Michalis Stamatogiannis (GRE)	19.30 m	Georgi Ivanov (BUL)	18.96 m

=== Women ===
Event	Gold		Silver		Bronze	
60 metres	Inna Eftimova (BUL)	7.28	Andreea Ogrăzeanu (ROU)	7.44	Sandra Parlov (CRO)	7.49
400 metres	Vania Stambolova (BUL)	52.36	Meliz Redif (TUR)	53.52	Alina Panaite (ROU)	54.41 PB
800 metres	Merve Aydın (TUR)	2:03.80	Eleni Filandra (GRE)	2:05.13	Elena Popescu (MDA)	2:05.33 PB
1500 metres	Luiza Gega (ALB)	4:10.75 NR	Ioana Doagă (ROU)	4:10.84 PB	Larisa Arcip (ROU)	4:17.86 PB
3000 metres	Dudu Karakaya (TUR)	9:22.20 PB	Slađana Perunović (MNE)	9:32.60 PB	Elena Moagă (ROU)	9:46.15
60 m hurdles	Nevin Yanıt (TUR)	8.16	Ivana Lončarek (CRO)	8.51	Kristina Damianova (BUL)	8.74
4 × 400 m relay	Romania (ROU); Alina Andreea Panainte; Sanda Belgyan; Mirela Lavric; Bianca Răzor	3:39.51	Turkey (TUR); Özge Gürler; Merve Aydın; Emel Şanlı; Meliz Redif	3:41.47		
High jump	Venelina Veneva-Mateeva (BUL)	1.93 m	Esthera Petre (ROU)	1.91 m	Ana Šimić (CRO)	1.91 m
Pole vault	Stella-Iro Ledaki (GRE)	4.25 m PB	Buse Arıkazan (TUR)	4.00 m PB	Anna Ivanova (BUL)	4.00 m PB
Long jump	Mirjana Gagić (CRO)	6.28 NR	Cornelia Deiac (ROU)	6.22 m	Evaggelía Galéni (GRE)	6.10 m
Triple jump	Cristina Bujin (ROU)	14.04 m	Andriana Bynova (BUL)	13.70 m	Sevim Sinmez Serbest (TUR)	13.48 m PB
Shot put	Radoslava Mavrodieva (BUL)	16.74 m	Emel Dereli (TUR)	16.55 m	Filiz Kadoğan (TUR)	16.22 m
