= İzzet Safer =

Turkish sprinter (born 1990)

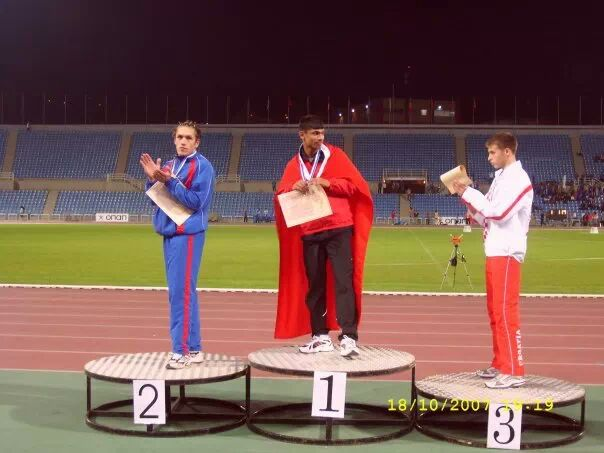

Personal information
- Born: 10 July 1990 (age 35) Mersin, Turkey
- Height: 178 cm (5 ft 10 in)

Sport
- Sport: Athletics
- Club: Enka SK
Medal record
Mediterranean Games
Bronze medal – third place	2013 Mersin	4×100 m relay

İzzet Safer (born 10 July 1990) is a Turkish sprinter who specialized in the 100 and 200 metres. He mainly won medals at the Balkan Athletics Championships as well as one relay medal at the Mediterranean Games. Domestically, he won seven Turkish championship titles.

== Career ==
He was born in Mersin and eventually joined the sports club Enka SK. In the age-specific categories, he finished fifth at the 2007 European Youth Olympic Festival (200 m). He also competed at the 2007 World Youth Championships (200 m), the 2008 World Junior Championships (100 m, 200 m and relay) and the 2009 European Junior Championships (100 m) without reaching the final.

In 2010 Safer became Turkish champion for the first time, winning both the 100 and 200 metres. He also won the 100 metres event at the 2010 European Team Championships First League, as well as finishing third in the 200 and relay. At the 2010 European Championships, he competed in all three events without progressing from the heat.

His first individual medal at the Balkan Championships came in 2011, a silver medal in the 200 metres, followed by two individual medals at the 2014 Balkan Championships, bronze in the 100 and silver in the 200 metres. A 200 bronze followed at the 2015 Balkan Championships, then another silver in 2016.

He also competed at the 2011 European U23 Championships, the 2012 Balkan Indoor Championships (60 m), the 2012 European Championships (100 m), the 2014 Balkan Indoor Championships (60 m) and the 2014 European Championships (200 m) where he failed to reach the final.

After the 2016 Olympics, he recorded a fifth place at the 2017 Islamic Solidarity Games (200 m) and was eliminated in the heats at the 2017 Summer Universiade (100 and 200 m).v

Following his double gold at the Turkish championships in 2010, he repeated this feat in 2013 and 2014, and lastly took the 200 metres title in 2015.

In the 4 × 100 metres relay, he won gold medals at the 2011, 2015 and 2020 Balkan Championships. He won a bronze medal at the 2013 Mediterranean Games, competed at the 2013 and 2014 European Team Championships Super League and won silver at the 2017 Islamic Solidarity Games. He also competed at the 2014 European Athletics Championships, the 2016 European Championships and the 2016 Summer Olympics without reaching the final, and finished seventh at the 2019 World Relays.
