= 2023 Balkan Athletics Championships =

- Dates: 22–23 July
- Host city: Kraljevo, Serbia
- Venue: Kraljevo Athletics Stadium
- Level: Senior
- Events: 42

The 2023 Balkan Athletics Championships was the 76th edition of the annual track and field competition for athletes from the Balkans, organised by Balkan Athletics. It was held at the Kraljevo Athletics Stadium on 22 and 23 July in Kraljevo, Serbia.

== Medal summary ==
=== Men ===
Event	Gold		Silver		Bronze	
100 metres (wind: -0.3 m/s)	Markus Fuchs (AUT)	10.40	Andriy Vasilyev (UKR)	10.44	Ioannis Nifadopoulos (GRE)	10.44
200 metres (wind: +0.4 m/s)	Ramil Guliyev (TUR)	20.69	Ioannis Kariofyllis (GRE)	20.70	Boško Kijanović (SRB)	20.87
400 metres	Oleksandr Pohorilko (UKR)	45.36 CR	Boško Kijanović (SRB)	45.50	Rok Ferlan (SLO)	45.83
800 metres	Salih Teksöz (TUR)	1:47.95	Marino Bloudek (CRO)	1:48.56	Jan Vukovič (SLO)	1:48.69
1500 metres	Raphael Pallitsch (AUT)	3:43.74	Marcel Tobler (AUT)	3:44.01	Nicolae Coman (ROM)	3:45.64
3000 metres	Elzan Bibić (SRB)	8:11.42	Sebastian Frey (AUT)	8:27.99	Uroš Gutić (BIH)	8:41.38
5000 metres	Sebastian Frey (AUT)	14:01.97	Ramazan Baştuğ (TUR)	14:11.20	Dino Bošnjak (CRO)	14:26.00
110 metres hurdles (wind: +0.9 m/s)	Milan Trajkovic (CYP)	13.28 CR	Mikdat Sevler (TUR)	13.46	Alin Ionuţ Anton (ROU)	13.60
400 metres hurdles	Yasmani Copello (TUR)	48.71 CR	Berke Akcam (TUR)	48.97	Nikola Kostić (SRB)	50.21
3000 metres Steeplechase	Tobias Rattinger (AUT)	8:54.23	Turgay Bayram (TUR)	8:55.31	Ersin Tekal (TUR)	8:57.82
4 × 100 metres relay	Turkey; Ertan Özkan; Kayhan Özer; Batuhan Altıntaş; Ramil Guliyev	39.09 CR	Greece; Sotirios Garaganis; Ioannis Kariofyllis; Ioannis Granitsiodis; Ioannis Nifadopoulos	39.52	Romania; Petre Rezmives; Marian Valentin Tanase; Alin Ionuţ Anton; Cristian Nicusor Roiban	39.65
4 × 400 metres relay	Ukraine; Mykyta Barabanov; Danylo Danylenko; Mykyta Rodchenkov; Oleksandr Pohorilko	3:06.43	Slovenia; Lovro Mesec Košir; Jan Vukovič; Žan Rudolf; Rok Ferlan	3:07.32	Croatia; Lukas Cik; Andrej Belčić; Hrvoje Čukman; Marko Orešković	3:11.47
High jump	Alperen Acet (TUR)	2.28	Tihomir Ivanov (BUL)	2.25	Slavko Stević (SRB)	2.18
Pole vault	Vladyslav Malykhin (UKR)	5.50	Riccardo Klotz (AUT)	5.30	Ivan Horvat (CRO)	5.20
Long jump	Strahinja Jovančević (SRB)	7.89	Lazar Anić (SRB)	7.78	Andreas Trajkovski (MKD)	7.75
Triple jump	Necati Er (TUR)	16.58	Dimitrios Tsiamis (GRE)	16.33w	Can Özüpek (TUR)	16.18
Shot put	Mesud Pezer (BIH)	20.55	Asmir Kolašinac (SRB)	20.07	Odisseas Mouzenidis (GRE)	19.54
Discus Throw	Martin Marković (CRO)	62.32	Apostolos Parellis (CYP)	61.88	Georgios Koniarakis (CYP)	60.12
Hammer Throw	Christos Frantzeskakis (GRE)	74.62	Serghei Marghiev (MDA)	73.52	Özkan Baltacı (TUR)	73.34
Javelin Throw	Alexandru Novac (ROU)	80.57	Ioannis Kyriazis (GRE)	76.5	Anze Durjava (SLO)	72.91
Decathlon	Fran Bonifačić (CRO)	7677	Angelos-Tzanis Andreoglou (GRE)	7676	Aris-Nikolaos Peristeris (GRE)	7479
WR world record | AR area record | CR championship record | GR games record | NR national record | OR Olympic record | PB personal best | SB season best | WL world leading (in a given season)

=== Women ===
Event	Gold		Silver		Bronze	
100 metres (wind: +0.1 m/s)	Ivana Ilić (SRB)	11.48	Olivia Fotopoulou (CYP)	11.51	Milana Tirnanić (SRB)	11.3
200 metres (wind: +2.1 m/s)	Olivia Fotopoulou (CYP)	22.68	Polyniki Emmanoulidou (GRE)	22.87	Artemis Anastasiou (GRE)	23.13
400 metres	Andrea Miklos (ROU)	51.75	Kateryna Karpiuk (UKR)	52.89	Tetyana Melnyk (UKR)	53.13
800 metres	Olha Lyakhova (UKR)	2:01.82	Nina Vuković (CRO)	2:02.62	Dilek Koçak (TUR)	2:02.93
1500 metres	Şilan Ayyıldız (TUR)	4:17.52	Sivan Auerbach (ISR)	4:17.78	Lenuta Simiuc (ROU)	4:17.84
3000 metres	Luiza Gega (ALB)	9:21.48	Burcu Subatan (TUR)	9:25.75	Liza Šajn (SLO)	9:48.13
5000 metres	Luiza Gega (ALB)	16:07.93	Sümeyye Erol (TUR)	16:43.95	Burcu Subatan (TUR)	17:01.77
100 metres hurdles (wind: +1.9 m/s)	Natalia Christofi (CYP)	12.86	Nika Glojnarič (SLO)	13.03	Anamaria Nesteriuc (ROM)	13.04
400 metres hurdles	Dimitra Gnafaki (GRE)	56.45	Mariya Buryak (UKR)	57.24	Agata Zupin (SLO)	58.05
3000 metres Steeplechase	Luiza Gega (ALB)	9:21.53	Tuğba Güvenç (TUR)	9:29.75	Semra Karaslan (TUR)	9:47.76
4 × 100 metres relay	Serbia; Anja Lukić; Ivana Ilić; Tamara Milutinović; Milana Tirnanić	44.65 NR	Romania; Emma Maria Matyus; Valeria Bisericescu; Anamaria Nesteriuc; Marina Andreea Baboi	45.97	Only two finishing teams	
4 × 400 metres relay	Ukraine; Mariya Buryak; Tetiana Kharashchuk; Tetyana Melnyk; Kateryna Klymiuk	3:31.88	Greece; Dimitra Gnafaki; Irini Vasiliou; Georgia-Maria Despollari; Despina Mourta	3:33.35	Croatia; Natalija Švenda; Nicole Milić; Nina Vuković; Veronika Drljačić	3:40.19
High jump	Daniela Stanciu (ROU)	1.91	Panagiota Dosi (GRE)	1.91	Buse Savaşkan (TUR)	1.89
Pole vault	Eleni-Klaoudia Polak (GRE)	4.40	Nikoleta Kyriakopoulou (GRE)	4.30	Yana Gladiychuk (UKR)	4.20
Long jump	Milica Gardašević (SRB)	6.91	Filippa Kviten (CYP)	6.42	Milena Mitkova (BUL)	6.37
Triple jump	Tuğba Danışmaz (TUR)	14.00	Elena Andreea Taloș (ROU)	13.75	Diana Maria Ion (ROU)	13.61
Shot put	Dimitriana Bezede (MDA)	17.94	Maria Magkoulia (GRE)	15.65	Sopo Shatirishvili (GEO)	15.47
Discus Throw	Özlem Becerek (TUR)	57.67	Lucija Leko (CRO)	53.11	Estel Valeanu (ISR)	52.91
Hammer Throw	Zalina Marghieva (MDA)	67.00	Olena Khamaza (UKR)	66.44	Valentina Savva (CYP)	66.24
Javelin Throw	Adriana Vilagoš (SRB)	60.62	Martina Ratej (SLO)	58.58	Eda Tuğsuz (TUR)	57.17
Heptathlon	Maja Bedrač (SLO)	5418	Anastasia Dragomirova (GRE)	5381	Emma Maria Matyus (ROU)	4919
WR world record | AR area record | CR championship record | GR games record | NR national record | OR Olympic record | PB personal best | SB season best | WL world leading (in a given season)

== Medal table ==
* Host nation (Serbia)

Rank	Nation	Gold	Silver	Bronze	Total
1	Turkey	9	7	8	24
2	Serbia*	6	3	4	13
3	Ukraine	5	4	2	11
4	Austria	4	3	0	7
5	Greece	3	11	4	18
6	Cyprus	3	3	2	8
7	Romania	3	2	7	12
8	Albania	3	0	0	3
9	Croatia	2	3	4	9
10	Moldova	2	1	0	3
11	Slovenia	1	3	5	9
12	Bosnia and Herzegovina	1	0	1	2
13	Bulgaria	0	1	1	2
13	Israel	0	1	1	2
15	Georgia	0	0	1	1
15	North Macedonia	0	0	1	1
Totals (16 entries)		42	42	41	125
