= 2011 Balkan Athletics Championships =

- Dates: 2–3 July
- Host city: Sliven, Bulgaria
- Venue: Stadion Hadzhi Dimitar
- Level: Senior
- Type: Outdoor
- Events: 40

The 2011 Balkan Athletics Championships was the 64th edition of the annual track and field competition for athletes from the Balkans, organised by Balkan Athletics. It was held at Stadion Hadzhi Dimitar in Sliven, Bulgaria on 2 and 3 July.

Vania Stambolova of Bulgaria was the only athlete to win two individual events, as she topped the podium in the women's 400 metres sprint and 400 metres hurdles. Her teammate Ivet Lalova-Collio won both the individual women's 100 metres and 4 × 100 metres relay.

In the team competition, Greece won the men's section with 159 points to Bulgaria's 157, while Romania topped the women's table with 170 points to Greece's 160.

The original third placer in the men's shot put, Ivan Emilianov of Moldova with 19.38 m, was subsequently disqualified for doping.

== Results ==
=== Men ===
Event	Gold		Silver		Bronze	
100 metres	Cătălin Cîmpeanu (ROM)	10.43	Petar Kremenski (BUL)	10.48 PB	Oleg Șochin (MDA)	10.58
200 metres	Petar Kremenski (BUL)	20.79 PB	İzzet Safer (TUR)	21.07	Cătălin Cîmpeanu (ROM)	21.18
400 metres	Krasimir Braikov (BUL)	46.09 PB	Dimitrios Gravalos (GRE)	46.50	Serdar Tamaç (TUR)	46.60
800 metres	Predrag Randjelović (SRB)	1:49.15 PB	Konstadínos Nakópoulos (GRE)	1:49.20	Dušan Babić (BIH)	1:49.56
1500 metres	Andreas Dimitrakis (GRE)	3:54.33	Predrag Randjelović (SRB)	3:55.57 PB	Sava Todorov (BUL)	3:56.14
5000 metres	Fatih Bilgic (TUR)	14:11.45	Dimosthenis Magginas (GRE)	14:34.45	Adrian Trifan (ROM)	14:53.29
3000 m s'chase	Hakan Duvar (TUR)	8:37.21 PB	Alexandru Ghinea (ROM)	8:37.48 PB	Mitko Tsenov (BUL)	9:01.29
110 m hurdles	Konstadinos Douvalidis (GRE)	13.64	Martin Arnaudov (BUL)	14.22	Oktay Güneş (TUR)	14.38
400 m hurdles	Emir Bekrić (SRB)	50.08 PB	Konstadinos Anastasiou (GRE)	51.08	Attila Nagy (ROM)	51.46
4 × 100 m relay	Turkey (TUR); Serdar Tamaç; Sezai Özkaya; Hakan Karacaoğlu; İzzet Safer	39.81	Greece (GRE); Konstadínos Koutsouklákis; Mihaíl Dardaneliótis; Efstrátios Fraggoúlis; Iordánis Roussákis	40.42	Romania (ROM); Gabriel Karoly Salajan; Cătălin Cîmpeanu; Alexandru Teofilescu; Paul Ceici	40.51
4 × 400 m relay	Greece (GRE); Petros Kyriakidis; Athanasios Hatzidimitriou; Ioannis Dovolis; Michael Dardaneliotis	3:10.07	Turkey (TUR); Kursad Caliskan; Emrah Coban; Yavuz Can; Serdar Tamaç	3:10.29	Romania (ROM); Iulian Geambazu; Alin George Costache; Florin Purcea; Attila Nagy	3:10.47
High jump	Viktor Ninov (BUL)	2.25 m	Mihai Donisan (ROM)	2.20 m	Konstadinos Baniotis (GRE)	2.20 m
Pole vault	Spas Bukhalov (BUL)	5.20 m	Levente Kecskes (ROM)	4.80 m PB		
Long jump	Georgios Tsakonas (GRE)	7.86 m	Nikolay Atanasov (BUL)	7.74 m	Alexandr Cuharenco (MDA)	7.61 m
Triple jump	Momchil Karailiev (BUL)	16.93 m w	Vladimir Letnicov (MDA)	16.67 m w	Alexandru George Baciu (ROM)	16.13 m w
Shot put	Asmir Kolašinac (SRB)	19.93 m	Hamza Alić (BIH)	19.82 m	Yeóryios Yeromarkákis (GRE)	18.48 m
Discus throw	Ercüment Olgundeniz (TUR)	63.05 m	Sergiu Ursu (ROM)	59.70 m	Yeóryios Trémos (GRE)	55.05 m
Hammer throw	Stamátios Papadoníou (GRE)	68.67 m	Roman Rozna (MDA)	64.40 m	Cosmin Sorescu (ROM)	63.28 m
Javelin throw	Yervásios Filippídis (GRE)	72.72 m	Levente Bartha (ROM)	70.30 m	Aykut Tanriverdi (TUR)	67.10 m

=== Women ===
Event	Gold		Silver		Bronze	
100 metres	Ivet Lalova-Collio (BUL)	10.96	Maria Gatou (GRE)	11.57 PB	Alina Andreea Panainte (ROM)	11.6
200 metres	Grigoría-Emmanouéla Keramidá (GRE)	24.53 PB	Celia Alexandra Trifoi (ROM)	24.77	Olesea Cojuhari (MDA)	25.08
400 metres	Vania Stambolova (BUL)	53.94	Agní Dervéni (GRE)	54.59	Nagihan Karadere (TUR)	55.17
800 metres	Eleni Filandra (GRE)	2:03.31	Mirela Lavric (ROM)	2:04.88	Teodora Kolarova (BUL)	2:05.57
1500 metres	Luiza Gega (ALB)	4:14.22 PB	Larisa Arcip (ROM)	4:14.89 PB	María Pánou (GRE)	4:21.98
3000 metres	Cristina Vasiloiu (ROM)	9:27.67	Ana Subotić (SRB)	9:28.58 PB	Daniela Yordanova (BUL)	9:28.90
100 m hurdles	Kristina Damyanova (BUL)	13.78	Andreea Ionescu (ROM)	13.90	Gorana Cvijetić (BIH)	13.91
400 m hurdles	Vania Stambolova (BUL)	54.23	Nagihan Karadere (TUR)	56.74	Andreea Ionescu (ROM)	59.50
4 × 100 m relay	Bulgaria (BUL); Inna Eftimova; Monika Gachevska; Galina Nikolova; Ivet Lalova-Collio	44.49	Greece (GRE); Maria Gatou; Ekateríni Karatzá; Agní Dervéni; Grigoría-Emmanouéla Keramidá	45.59	Romania (ROM); Paula Băduleţ; Anamaria Ioniță; Celia Alexandra Trifoi; Alina Andreea Panainte	46.29
4 × 400 m relay	Romania (ROM); Paula Badulet; Mihaela Nunu; Ana Maria Ionita; Alina Panainte	3:42.27	Bulgaria (BUL); Monika Gachevska; Teodora Kolarova; Silvia Danekova; Violeta Metodieva	3:47.23	Greece (GRE); Anastasia Papoutsaki; Efthymia Gavala; Katerina Karatza; Maria Petridou	3:47.38
High jump	Burcu Ayhan (TUR)	1.86 m	Daniela Stanciu (ROM)	1.81 m	Mladena Petrušić (BIH)	1.71 m
Pole vault	Anna Ivanova (BUL)	4.10 m PB	Jelena Radinovič-Vasič (SRB)	4.00 m	Stella-Iro Ledaki (GRE)	3.80 m
Long jump	Ivana Španović (SRB)	6.56 m w	Viorica Țigău (ROM)	6.44 m	Magdalena Khristova (BUL)	6.18 m
Triple jump	Andriana Bânova (BUL)	14.34 m PB	Cristina Bujin (ROM)	14.13 m	Çağdaş Arslan (TUR)	13.69 m NR
Shot put	Radoslava Mavrodieva (BUL)	16.57 m	Hrisí Moisídou (GRE)	15.57 m	Dijana Šefčić (SRB)	14.46 m
Discus throw	Dragana Tomašević (SRB)	61.95 m	Natalia Artîc (MDA)	53.81 m	Chrysoula Anagnostopoulou (GRE)	51.74 m
Hammer throw	Bianca Perie (ROM)	66.69 m	Tuğçe Şahutoğlu (TUR)	60.92 m	Paša Šehić (BIH)	55.98 m
Javelin throw	Savva Lika (GRE)	57.63 m	Maria Negoiţă (ROM)	55.60 m	Marija Vučenović (SRB)	54.03 m PB

== Medal table ==
* Host nation (Bulgaria)

Rank	Nation	Gold	Silver	Bronze	Total
1	Bulgaria*	13	4	5	22
2	Greece	9	9	7	25
3	Turkey	5	4	5	14
4	Serbia	5	3	2	10
5	Romania	4	13	10	27
6	Albania	1	0	0	1
7	Moldova	0	3	3	6
8	Bosnia and Herzegovina	0	1	4	5
Totals (8 entries)		37	37	36	110
