= Dudu Karakaya =

Turkish middle-distance runner

Dudu Karakaya-Koyuncu
Personal information
- Nationality: Turkey
- Born: November 11, 1985 (age 40) Kayseri, Turkey
- Education: Erciyes University
- Height: 167 cm (5 ft 6 in)
- Weight: 48 kg (106 lb)

Sport
- Sport: Middle-distance
- Club: Enkaspor

Achievements and titles
- Personal bests: 1500 m 4:11.26 (2008); 3000 m 9:02.57 (2009); 5000 m 15:20.00 (2012); 3000 m sc 10:59.45 (2004); 1500 m ind 4:19.62 (2011); 3000 m ind 9:09.82 (2012)
Medal record
Women's athletics
Representing Turkey
European Team Championships First League
| Gold medal – first place | 2009 Bergen | 1500 m |
| Gold medal – first place | 2009 Bergen | 3000 m |
Balkan Games
| Gold medal – first place | 2012 Istanbul | 1500 m ind |

Dudu Karakaya-Koyuncu (born November 11, 1985, in Kayseri, Turkey) is a Turkish middle distance runner competing in the 1500 m, 3000 m, 5000 m, and 3000 m steeplechase events. The 167 cm (5 ft 6 in) tall athlete at 48 kg (106 lb) is a member of Enkaspor in Istanbul.

She began with athletics in secondary school years. Dudu Karakaya-Koyuncu graduated in physical education and sports from Erciyes University.

In 2009, Dudu Karakaya-Koyuncu became gold medalist in the 3000 m and 5000 m events of European Team Championships-First League held in Bergen, Norway. At the 2012 Balkan Athletics Indoor Championships held in Istanbul, she won the gold medal in 1500 m.

Karakaya qualified for participation in the 5000 m event at the 2012 Summer Olympics.

== Achievements ==
| Year | Competition | Venue | Position | Event | Notes |
Representing Turkey
| 2004 | World Junior Championships | Grosseto, Italy | 36th (h) | 3000 m steeplechase | 11:16.25 |
| 2006 | European Athletics Cup; First League Group B | Thessaloniki, Greece | 6th | 3000 m | 9:28.76 |
| 2006 | European Athletics Cup; First League Group B | Thessaloniki, Greece | 7th | 5000 m | 17:19.05 |
| 2007 | European U23 Championships | Debrecen, Hungary | 4th | 5000m | 16:30.79 |
| 2009 | European Team Championships; First League | Bergen, Norway | 1st | 3000 m | 9:02.57 |
| 2009 | European Team Championships; First League | Bergen, Norway | 1st | 5000 m | 15:24.86 |
| 2012 | Balkan Indoor Championships | Istanbul, Turkey | 1st | 1500 m ind | |
| 2012 | 67th Cezmi Or Memorial | Istanbul, Turkey | 2nd | 5000 m | 15:20.00 PB |
| 2012 | European Championships | Helsinki, Finland | 11th | 5000 m | 15:29.71 |
