= 2020 Balkan Athletics Championships =

- Dates: 19–20 September
- Host city: Cluj-Napoca, Romania
- Venue: Cluj Arena
- Level: Senior
- Events: 42
- Participation: 256 athletes from 11 nations

The 2020 Balkan Athletics Championships was the 73rd edition of the annual track and field competition for athletes from the Balkans, organised by Balkan Athletics. It was held on 19 and 20 September at the Cluj Arena in Cluj-Napoca, Romania.

== Results ==
=== Men ===
Event	Gold		Silver		Bronze	
100 metres	Jak Ali Harvey (TUR)	10.30	Oleksandr Sokolov (UKR)	10.35	Aleksa Kijanović (SRB)	10.41
200 metres	Jak Ali Harvey (TUR)	20.77	Oleksandr Sokolov (UKR)	21.10	Marko Čeko (CRO)	21.19
400 metres	Boško Kijanović (SRB)	46.56	Mihai Pîslaru (ROU)	46.58	Oleksandr Pohorilko (UKR)	46.87
800 metres	Oleh Myronets (UKR)	1:49.60	Murat Yalçınkaya (TUR)	1:49.87	Abedin Mujezinović (BIH)	1:50.15
1500 metres	Yervand Mkrtchyan (ARM)	3:47.60	Dino Bošnjak (CRO)	3:47.82	Mehmet Çelik (TUR)	3:47.98
3000 metres	Yervand Mkrtchyan (ARM)	8:12.02	Dino Bošnjak (CRO)	8:12.11	Ömer Amaçtan (TUR)	8:13.66
5000 metres	Maxim Răileanu (MDA)	14:09.23	Nicolae Soare (ROU)	14:14.09	Ömer Amaçtan (TUR)	14:17.30
3000 metres Steeplechase	Turgay Bayram (TUR)	8:54.92	Osman Junuzović (BIH)	8:58.14	Mitko Tsenov (BUL)	9:01.31
110 metres hurdles	Mikdat Sevler (TUR)	14.07	Stanislav Stankov (BUL)	14.08	Viktor Solianov (UKR)	14.09
400 metres hurdles	Berke Akçam (TUR)	50.60	Dmytro Romanyuk (UKR)	50.61	Denys Nechyporenko (UKR)	51.42
4 × 100 metres relay	Turkey; Kayhan Özer; Jak Ali Harvey; İzzet Safer; Ertan Özkan	39.63	Ukraine; Oleksandr Sokolov; Emil Ibragimov; Stanislav Kovalenko; Oleksandr Pohorilko	39.87	Romania; Cristian Roiban; Marius Tone; Daniel Petre Rezmiveş; Valentin Tănase	40.55
4 × 400 metres relay	Turkey; Batuhan Altıntaş; Yavuz Can; Berke Akçam; İlyas Çanakçı	3:06.35	Romania; Robert Parge; Mihai Răzvan Vasiliu; Vlad Dulcescu; Mihai Pîslaru	3:08.28	Ukraine; Oleh Myronets; Denys Nechyporenko; Danylo Danylenko; Oleksandr Pohorilko	3:08.53
High jump	Andriy Protsenko (UKR)	2.25	Dmytro Yakovenko (UKR)	2.15	Alperen Acet (TUR)	2.15
Pole vault	Ilia Kravchenko (UKR)	5.20	Ivan Horvat (CRO)	5.20	Artur Bortnikov (UKR)	5.00
Long jump	Marko Čeko (CRO)	7.88	Strahinja Jovančević (SRB)	7.79	Lazar Anić (SRB)	7.74
Triple jump	Levon Aghasyan (ARM)	16.53	Florin Alexandru Vișan (ROU)	16.15	Alexandru Gheorghe Tache (GEO)	15.91
Shot put	Andrei Toader (ROU)	19.44	Ihor Musiienko (UKR)	19.42	Kemal Mešić (BIH)	19.19
Discus throw	Alin Firfirică (ROU)	64.72	Martin Marković (CRO)	58.31	Sergiu Ursu (ROU)	57.09
Hammer throw	Mykhaylo Kokhan (UKR)	75.43	Özkan Baltacı (TUR)	73.72	Serghei Marghiev (MDA)	72.74
Javelin throw	Andrian Mardare (MDA)	83.60 CR	Mark Slavov (BUL)	83.40 NR	Dejan Mileusnić (BIH)	79.57
Decathlon	Aleksandar Grnović (SRB)	7179	Răzvan George Roman (ROU)	6605	Vasil Vlasov (BUL)	6237
WR world record | AR area record | CR championship record | GR games record | NR national record | OR Olympic record | PB personal best | SB season best | WL world leading (in a given season)

=== Women ===
Event	Gold		Silver		Bronze	
100 metres	Milana Tirnanić (SRB)	11.67	Inna Eftimova (BUL)	11.70	Marina Baboi (ROU)	11.73
200 metres	Inna Eftimova (BUL)	23.81	Camelia Gal (ROU)	23.88	Elif Polat (TUR)	24.35
400 metres	Hanna Ryzhykova (UKR)	51.74	Alina Lohvynenko (GRE)	52.89	Nevin İnce (TUR)	55.94
800 metres	Claudia Bobocea (ROU)	2:03.32	Lilyana Georgieva (BUL)	2:05.16	Daria Vdovychenko (UKR)	2:06.07
1500 metres	Claudia Bobocea (ROU)	4:12.95	Orysia Demianiuk (UKR)	4:16.97	Burcu Subatan (TUR)	4:17.79
3000 metres	Burcu Subatan (TUR)	9:24.89	Roxana Bârcă (ROU)	9:24.97	Bojana Bjeljac (CRO)	9:26.93
5000 metres	Iuliya Shmatenko (UKR)	15:41.17	Bojana Bjeljac (CRO)	16:18.56	Teodora Simović (SRB)	16:53.65
3000 metres Steeplechase	Nataliya Strebkova (UKR)	9:41.38	Adelina Elena Panaet (ROU)	9:59.12	Derya Kunur (TUR)	10:21.81
100 metres hurdles	Hanna Plotitsyna (UKR)	13.21	Anamaria Nesteriuc (ROU)	13.32	Anja Lukić (SRB)	13.39
400 metres hurdles	Viktoriya Tkachuk (UKR)	55.58	Mariya Mykolenko (UKR)	57.43	Sanda Belgyan (ROU)	58.40
4 × 100 metres relay	Romania; Ana Maria Roşianu; Iulia Nicoleta Banaga; Anamaria Nesteriuc; Marina Baboi	46.11	Bulgaria; Inna Eftimova; Elena Miteva; Iva Aleksandrova; Kristina Bourukova	47.33	Moldova; Iuliana Dovganici; Anastasia Senchiv; Tatiana Contrebut; Diana Podoleanu	50.57
4 × 400 metres relay	Ukraine; Mariya Mykolenko; Alina Lohvynenko; Viktoriya Tkachuk; Hanna Ryzhykova	3:34.21	Romania; Adina Elena Circiogel; Bianca Anton; Sanda Belgyan; Camelia Gal	3:38.60	Bulgaria; Elena Miteva; Lilyana Georgieva; Bozhidara Gateva; Kristina Bourukova	3:57.10
High jump	Daniela Stanciu (ROU)	1.88	Oksana Okunyeva (UKR)	1.88	Yuliya Chumachenko (UKR)	1.84
Pole vault	Iana Gladiichuk (UKR)	4.40	Maryna Kylypko (UKR)	4.30	Demet Parlak (TUR)	4.10
Long jump	Gabriela Petrova (BUL)	6.41	Oksana Martynova (UKR)	6.33	Florentina Iusco (ROU)	6.32
Triple jump	Gabriela Petrova (BUL)	14.19	Florentina Iusco (ROU)	13.50	Tuğba Aydın (TUR)	13.44
Shot put	Andreea Apachite (ROU)	14.56	Diana Ţigănaşu (ROU)	14.08	Yana Kopcheva (BUL)	12.74
Discus throw	Özlem Becerek (TUR)	53.41	Andreea Iuliana Lungu (ROU)	50.15	Yana Kopcheva (BUL)	41.48
Hammer throw	Bianca Florentina Ghelber (ROU)	72.18	Iryna Klymets (UKR)	70.57	Zalina Petrivskaya (MDA)	67.17
Javelin throw	Vanja Spaić (BIH)	53.31	Mikhaela Petkova (BUL)	50.35	Ioana Valentina Plăvan (ROU)	47.79
Heptathlon	Alina Shukh (UKR)	5940	Florentina Budică (ROU)	4778	Iva Aleksandrova (BUL)	4773
WR world record | AR area record | CR championship record | GR games record | NR national record | OR Olympic record | PB personal best | SB season best | WL world leading (in a given season)

== Medal table ==
The host country is highlighted in lavender blue

Rank	Nation	Gold	Silver	Bronze	Total
1	Ukraine	12	13	7	32
2	Turkey	10	3	11	24
3	Romania*	8	14	7	29
4	Bulgaria	3	6	6	15
5	Serbia	3	1	4	8
6	Armenia	3	0	0	3
7	Moldova	2	0	3	5
8	Croatia	1	5	2	8
9	Bosnia and Herzegovina	1	1	3	5
Totals (9 entries)		43	43	43	129
