= List of Romanian records in athletics =

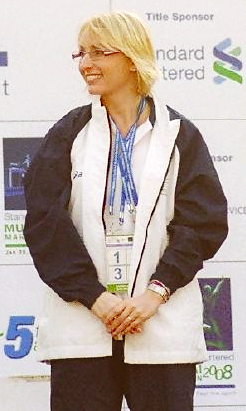
Gabriela Szabo broke multiple Romanian track running records.

The following are the national records in athletics in Romania maintained by its national athletics federation: Federatia Romana de Atletism (FRA).

== Outdoor ==
Key to tables: Awaiting ratification Record not kept by FRA Not ratified or later rescinded by FRA

=== Men ===
Event	Record	Athlete	Date	Meet	Place	Ref.
100 m	10.21 (+0.2 m/s)	Daniel Cojocaru	17 June 1994		Bucharest, Romania	
150 m (bend)	15.80 NWI	Marian Tanase	6 May 2023	Concurs National de Probe Neclasice	Târgu Jiu, Romania	
200 m	20.70 (+1.0 m/s)	Florin Suciu	24 July 2005		Novi Sad, Serbia and Montenegro	
300 m	32.31	Mihai Dringo	9 August 2025	Mityng Ambasadorów Białostockiego Sportu	Białystok, Poland	
400 m	44.74	Mihai Dringo	28 June 2025	European Team Championships	Maribor, Slovenia	
600 m	1:16.95	Cristian Voicu	21 September 2025	ESET Track Night	Busto Arsizio, Italy	
800 m	1:44.93	Cătălin Tecuceanu	14 September 2021	Hanžeković Memorial	Zagreb, Croatia	
1500 m	3:34.13	Alexandru Vasile	13 June 1997		Bucharest, Romania	
Mile	3:57.73	Ioan Zaizan	17 July 2013	Morton Games	Finglas, Ireland	
2000 m	5:02.27	Ovidiu Olteanu	9 June 1998		Bratislava, Slovakia	
3000 m	7:53.19	Valentin Coroja	18 June 1989		Warsaw, Poland	
5000 m	13:15.0	Ilie Floroiu	23 July 1978		Bucharest, Romania	
5 km (road)	14:06	Ștefan Iulius Gavril	16 February 2020	5 km Herculis	Monte Carlo, Monaco	
10,000 m	27:40.06	Ilie Floroiu	29 August 1978	European Championships	Prague, Czechoslovakia	
10 km (road)	28:38	Dorin Andrei Rusu	25 September 2022	Brașov Running Festival	Brașov, Romania	
15 km (road)	44:48	Nicolae Negru	28 October 2000		Tulsa, United States	
One hour	19707 m	Nicolae Mustață	17 October 1971		Bucharest, Romania	
20 km (road)	1:02:01	Cristenel Irimia	2 September 2007		Zalău, Romania	
Half marathon	1:01:45	Nicolae Negru	4 October 1997	World Half Marathon Championships	Košice, Slovakia	
25 km (road)	1:18:14	Constantin Ștefan	27 April 1975		Hluboka, Czechoslovakia	
Marathon	2:11:58	Nicolae Soare	12 October 2025	Bucharest Marathon	Bucharest, Romania	
50 km (road)	2:52:27	Ilie Corneschi	17 April 2021		Bucharest, Romania	
100 km (road)	6:41:07	Julian Filipov	11 September 2021		Netherlands	
6-hour run (road)	85.563 km	Claudiu Gorgan	17 April 2021		Bucharest, Romania	
12-hour run (road)	132.473 km	Vadim Balan	17 April 2021		Bucharest, Romania	
24-hour run (road)	277.476 km	Julian Filipov	17–18 April 2021		Bucharest, Romania	
110 m hurdles	13.34 (+1.0 m/s)	George Boroi	18 June 1993		Bucharest, Romania	
300 m hurdles	35.4 h	Mugur Matescu	13 May 1989		Bucharest, Romania	
400 m hurdles	49.22	Alejandro Argudín-Zaharia	4 September 1997	Jeux de la Francophonie	Antananarivo, Madagascar	
3000 m steeplechase	8:13.26	Florin Ionescu	21 August 1999	World Championships	Seville, Spain	
High jump	2.40 m	Sorin Matei	20 June 1990		Bratislava, Czechoslovakia	
Pole vault	5.50 m	Tiberiu Agoston	13 June 2003		Pierre-Bénite, France	
Pole vault	5.50 m	Tiberiu Agoston	28 August 2003	Universiade	Daegu, South Korea	
Long jump	8.37 m (+1.5 m/s)	Bogdan Tudor	9 July 1995		Bad Cannstatt, Germany	
Triple jump	17.81 m (+1.0 m/s)	Marian Oprea	5 July 2005	Athletissima	Lausanne, Switzerland	
Shot put	21.07 m	Andrei Toader	26 June 2022	Romanian Championships	Craiova, Romania	
Shot put	21.29 m (Note: not ratified by FRA but recognised by World Athletics)	Andrei Toader	13 June 2021		Brno, Czech Republic	
Discus throw	68.12 m	Iosif Nagy	22 May 1983		Zaragoza, Spain	
Hammer throw	77.60 m	Nicolae Bândar	1 June 1986		Bucharest, Romania	
Javelin throw	86.37 m	Alexandru Novac	5 July 2018		Nembro, Italy	
Decathlon	7843 pts h	Vasile Bogdan	7–8 June 1975		Paris, France	
Decathlon	100m (wind) / Long jump (wind) / Shot put / High jump / 400m / 110m H (wind) / Discus / Pole vault / Javelin / 1500m; 10.9 / 7.26 m / 13.93 m / 1.95 m / 50.8 / 15.0 / 41.46 m / 4.70 m / 59.80 m / 4:19.7					
20 km walk (road)	1:21:06	Costică Bălan	14 June 1996		Bucharest, Romania	
35 km walk (road)	2:37:23	Narcis Mihăilă	21 May 2023	European Team Championships	Poděbrady, Czech Republik	
50 km walk (road)	3:55:29	Marius Cocioran	16 May 2021	European Race Walking Team Championships	Poděbrady, Czech Republic	
4 × 100 m relay	39.18	Romania; Florian Homiuc; Alexandru Terpezan; Ionut Neagoe; Petre Rezmiveș	15 July 2018		Erzurum, Turkey	
4 × 400 m relay	3:04.23	Romania; Vasile Boboș; Florin Suciu; Cătălin Cîmpeanu; Ioan Vieru	12 August 2006	European Championships	Gothenburg, Sweden	

=== Women ===
Event	Record	Athlete	Date	Meet	Place	Ref.
100 m	11.30 (+0.5 m/s)	Ionela Târlea	19 June 1999	European Cup Super League	Paris, France	
150 m (bend)	18.63 NWI	Alexandra Uta	6 May 2023	Concurs National de Probe Neclasice	Târgu Jiu, Romania	
150 m (bend)	17.85 (+2.0 m/s)	Bianca Răzor	31 August 2013	Amsterdam Open & Flame Games	Amsterdam, Netherlands	
200 m	22.35 (+1.3 m/s)	Ionela Târlea	13 May 1999		Doha, Qatar	
300 m	36.20 A	Ionela Târlea	3 May 2003		Mexico City, Mexico	
400 m	49.88	Ionela Târlea	12 July 1999	Universiade	Palma de Mallorca, Spain	
800 m	1:55.05	Doina Melinte	1 August 1982		Bucharest, Romania	
1000 m	2:31.5 h	Maricica Puică	1 June 1986		Poiana Brașov, Romania	
1500 m	3:53.96	Paula Ivan	1 October 1988	Olympic Games	Seoul, South Korea	
Mile	4:15.61	Paula Ivan	10 July 1989		Nice, France	
Mile (road)	4:43.0	Cristina Balan	9 September 2023	Brașov Running Festival	Brașov, Romania	
2000 m	5:28.69	Maricica Puică	11 July 1986		London, United Kingdom	
3000 m	8:21.42	Gabriela Szabo	19 July 2002	Herculis	Fontvieille, Monaco	
5000 m	14:31.48	Gabriela Szabo	1 September 1998	ISTAF	Berlin, Germany	
5 km (road)	15:24 Wo	Mihaela Maria Botezan-Prundus	5 September 2004	Flora Lite Challenge for Women	London, United Kingdom	
10,000 m	31:11.24	Mihaela Botezan	27 August 2004	Olympic Games	Athens, Greece	
10 km (road)	31:46 Wo	Joan Chelimo Melly	4 October 2026	tRUNsylvania International 10K Brasov	Brașov, Romania	
15 km (road)	48:29	Constantina Diță-Tomescu	14 July 2002		Utica, United States	
20 km (road)	1:03:23	Constantina Diță-Tomescu	8 October 2006	World Road Running Championships	Debrecen, Hungary	
Half marathon	1:07:45	Stella Rutto	21 February 2021		Trabzon, Turkey	
25 km (road)	1:21:31+	Constantina Diță-Tomescu	22 October 2006	Chicago Marathon	Chicago, United States	
30 km (road)	1:41:51+	Nuța Olaru	10 October 2004	Chicago Marathon	Chicago, United States	
Marathon	2:21:30	Constantina Diță-Tomescu	9 October 2005	Chicago Marathon	Chicago, United States	
Marathon	2:18:04 (Note: not ratified by FRA but recognised by World Athletics)	Joan Chelimo Melly	17 April 2022	Seoul Marathon	Seoul, South Korea	
50 km (road)	3:16:28	Liliana Dragomir	6 June 2021		Palić, Serbia	
6-hour run (road)	74 km	Mariana Nenu	22 June 2019		Stadtoldendorf, Germany	
12-hour run (road)	123.465 km	Mariana Nenu	6 June 2021		Palić, Serbia	
24-hour run (road)	236.325 km	Mara Guler-Cionca	17–18 April 2021		Bucharest, Romania	
100 m hurdles	12.62 (+1.2 m/s)	Mihaela Stoica-Pogăceanu	29 June 1990		Villeneuve-d'Ascq, France	
200 m hurdles (bend)	25.9 h NWI	Valeria Bufanu	21 October 1970		Bucharest, Serbia	
400 m hurdles	53.25	Ionela Târlea	7 July 1999	Golden Gala	Rome, Italy	
Mile steeplechase	4:54.80	Stella Rutto	22 August 2025	Memorial Van Damme	Brussels, Belgium	
2000 m steeplechase	6:27.72	Mihaela Blaga	5 May 2024	Internationales Läufermeeting	Pliezhausen, Germany	
3000 m steeplechase	9:16.85	Cristina Casandra	17 August 2008	Olympic Games	Beijing, China	
High jump	2.02 m	Monica Iagăr	6 June 1998		Budapest, Hungary	
High jump	2.02 m	Monica Iagăr	17 June 2000		Villeneuve-d'Ascq, France	
Pole vault	4.22 m	Gabriela Mihalcea	11 June 1999		Dreux, France	
Long jump	7.43 m (+1.4 m/s)	Anișoara Cușmir-Stanciu	4 June 1983		Bucharest, Romania	
Triple jump	15.16 m (+0.1 m/s)	Rodica Mateescu	4 August 1997	World Championships	Athens, Greece	
Shot put	21.00 m	Mihaela Loghin	30 June 1984		Formia, Italy	
Discus throw	73.84 m	Daniela Costian	30 April 1988		Bucharest, Romania	
Hammer throw	76.07 m	Mihaela Melinte	29 August 1999		Rudlingen, Switzerland	
Javelin throw	65.08 m	Ana Mirela Țermure	10 June 2001		Bucharest, Romania	
Heptathlon	6619 pts	Liliana Năstase	1–2 August 1992	Olympic Games	Barcelona, Spain	
Heptathlon	100m H (wind) / High jump / Shot put / 200m (wind) / Long jump (wind) / Javelin / 800m; 12.86 / 1.82 m / 14.34 m / 23.70 / 6.49 m / 41.30 m / 2:11.22					
10 km walk (road)	42:16	Norica Câmpean	9 May 1999		Calella, Spain	
20 km walk (road)	1:27:41	Claudia Ștef	5 June 2004		A Coruña, Spain	
35 km walk (road)	2:59:18	Ana Rodean	21 May 2023	European Team Championships	Poděbrady, Czech Republik	
4 × 100 m relay	44.18	Romania; Doina Voinea; Lucia Militaru; Mihaela Pogăcean; Marieta Ilcu	2 August 1985		Stara Zagora, Bulgaria	
4 × 400 m relay	3:25.68	Romania; Otilia Ruicu-Eșanu; Alina Râpanu; Ana Maria Barbu; Ionela Târlea	20 June 1999	European Cup Super League	Paris, France	
Swedish relay	2:06.13	Romania; Bianca Tita; Stefania Balint; Maria Capota; Alexandra Uta	29 July 2023	European Youth Summer Olympic Festival	Maribor, Slovenia	
4 × 1500 m relay	17:51.48	Romania; Claudia Bobocea; Florina Pierdevară; Anca Maria Bunea; Lenuța Petronela Simiuc	24 May 2014	IAAF World Relays	Nassau, Bahamas	

=== Mixed ===
Event	Record	Athlete	Date	Meet	Place	Ref.
4 × 400 m relay	3:14.71	Romania; Mihai Dringo; Alexandra Ștefania Uță; Mario Alexandru Dobrescu; Andrea Miklós	29 June 2025	European Team Championships	Maribor, Slovenia	

== Indoor ==
=== Men ===
Event	Record	Athlete	Date	Meet	Place	Ref.
60 m	6.60	Johann Schromm	14 February 1981		Bucharest, Romania	
60 m	6.60	Catalin Cîmpeanu	9 February 2013	Romanian Championships	Bucharest, Romania	
200 m	20.94	Ioan Vieru	18 January 2004		Mannheim, Germany	
300 m	33.63	Sorin Alexandru Voinea	5 January 2025	BFTTA Indoor Series 2	London, United Kingdom	
400 m	45.94	Ioan Vieru	2 March 2002	European Championships	Vienna, Austria	
600 m	1:19.38	Mark Fandly	1 February 2025	Budapest Régió Fedettpályás Bajnokság	Budapest, Hungary	
800 m	1:47.21	Petre Drăgoescu	2 March 1985	IAAF Indoor Meeting	Athens, Greece	
1500 m	3:40.30	Ioan Zaizan	28 January 2014	Vienna Indoor Classic	Vienna, Austria	
3000 m	7:48.47 (Note: outdoor mark ratified as absolute record)	Ovidiu Olteanu	6 February 1998		Budapest, Hungary	
60 m hurdles	7.50	George Boroi	15 February 1994	Meeting Pas de Calais	Liévin, France	
High jump	2.38 m	Sorin Matei	3 February 1995		Wuppertal, Germany	
Pole vault	5.61 m (Note: outdoor mark ratified as absolute record)	Tiberiu Agoston	5 March 2001		Toulouse, France	
Long jump	8.30 m	Bogdan Țăruș	29 January 2000		Bucharest, Romania	
Triple jump	17.74 m	Marian Oprea	18 February 2006		Bucharest, Romania	
Shot put	21.27 m	Andrei Toader	9 March 2025	European Championships	Apeldoorn, Netherlands	
Heptathlon	5562 pts	Bogdan Popa	1–2 March 2012		Bucharest, Romania	
Heptathlon	60m / Long jump / Shot put / High jump / 60m H / Pole vault / 1000m; 7.19 / 7.30 m / 11.40 m / 2.07 m / 8.47 / 4.80 m / 2:55.81					
5000 m walk	18:59.24	Costică Bălan	19 February 2000		Bucharest, Romania	
4 × 200 m relay	1:27.82	CSM Ploiești; Cosmin Homiuc; Petre Nicolae Rezmives; Bogdan Oprina; Cristian Radu	12 March 2017		Istanbul, Turkey	
4 × 400 m relay	3:10.36	Romania; Andrei Remus; Mihai Dringo; Simon Denis; Robert Parge	5 March 2022	Balkan Championships	Istanbul, Turkey	

=== Women ===
Event	Record	Athlete	Date	Meet	Place	Ref.
60 m	7.22	Iolanda Oanțã	7 February 1992		Bucharest, Romania	
60 m	7.22	Mirela Dulgheru	23 January 1993		Bacău, Romania	
60 m	7.21 (Note: doubtful timing)	Mirela Dulgheru	25 January 1992		Bucharest, Romania	
200 m	22.39	Ionela Târlea	6 March 1999	World Championships	Maebashi, Japan	
300 m	38.34	Bianca Răzor	25 January 2018	Czech Indoor Gala	Ostrava, Czech Republic	
400 m	50.56	Ionela Târlea	1 March 1998	European Championships	Valencia, Spain	
800 m	1:59.00	Doina Melinte	8 February 1987		Budapest, Hungary	
1000 m	2:35.35	Claudia Bobocea	25 February 2023	World Indoor Tour Final	Birmingham, United Kingdom	
1500 m	4:00.27+	Doina Melinte	9 February 1990		East Rutherford, United States	
Mile	4:17.14	Doina Melinte	9 February 1990		East Rutherford, United States	
2000 m	5:30.53	Gabriela Szabo	8 March 1998		Sindelfingen, Germany	
3000 m	8:32.88	Gabriela Szabo	18 February 2001	AVIVA Indoor Grand Prix	Birmingham, United Kingdom	
Two miles	9:41.07	Margareta Keszeg	28 February 1986		New York City, United States	
5000 m	14:47.35	Gabriela Szabo	13 February 1999		Dortmund, Germany	
60 m hurdles	7.86	Mihaela Stoica-Pogăceanu	5 March 1988		Budapest, Hungary	
60 m hurdles	7.86	Mihaela Stoica-Pogăceanu	5 March 1989		Bacău, Romania	
High jump	2.03 m (Note: outdoor mark ratified as absolute record)	Monica Iagăr	23 January 1999		Bucharest, Romania	
Pole vault	4.25 m (Note: outdoor mark ratified as absolute record)	Gabriela Mihalcea	13 February 1999	IAAF Indoor Meeting	Athens, Greece	
Long jump	6.99 m	Mirela Dulgheru	23 January 1993		Bacău, Romania	
Triple jump	14.94 m	Cristina Nicolau	5 February 2000		Bucharest, Romania	
Shot put	20.57 m	Mihaela Loghin	22 February 1987		Bucharest, Romania	
Pentathlon	4753 pts	Liliana Năstase	10 February 1993		Bacău, Romania	
Pentathlon	60m H / High jump / Shot put / Long jump / 800m; 8.17 / 1.75 m / 13.94 m / 6.67 m / 2:14.88					
3000 m walk	11:40.33 (Note: not ratified by FRA but recognised by World Athletics)	Claudia Ștef	30 January 1999		Bucharest, Romania	
4 × 200 m relay	1:40.27	CS Rapid București; E. Constantinescu; M. Lazãr; M. Pogãcean; I. Oanțã	16 February 1991		Bacău, Romania	
4 × 400 m relay	3:30.06	Romania; Angela Moroșanu; Alina Râpanu; Maria Rus; Ionela Târlea	7 March 2004	World Championships	Budapest, Hungary	
