= 2007 European Athletics U23 Championships – Women's 5000 metres =

The women's 5000 metres event at the 2007 European Athletics U23 Championships was held in Debrecen, Hungary, at Gyulai István Atlétikai Stadion on 15 July.

== Medalists ==
Gold	Laura Kenney; United Kingdom
Silver	Volha Minina; Belarus
Bronze	Marta Romo; Spain

== Results ==
=== Final ===
15 July

Rank	Name	Nationality	Time	Notes
1st place, gold medalist(s)	Laura Kenney	United Kingdom	16:22.28	
2nd place, silver medalist(s)	Volha Minina	Belarus	16:27.31	
3rd place, bronze medalist(s)	Marta Romo	Spain	16:29.56	
4	Dudu Karakaya	Turkey	16:30.79	
5	Lesley van Miert	Netherlands	16:34.52	
6	Zsófia Erdélyi	Hungary	16:43.57	
7	Paula Todoran	Romania	16:48.62	
8	Svetlana Kireyeva	Russia	16:49.39	
9	Susie Hignett	United Kingdom	16:53.38	
10	Gema Barrachina	Spain	16:56.15	
11	Galina Maksimova	Russia	16:57.75	
12	Remalda Kergytė	Lithuania	17:06.33	
13	Giulia Francario	Italy	17:11.26	
14	Marieke Falkmann	Netherlands	17:16.95	

== Participation ==
According to an unofficial count, 14 athletes from 10 countries participated in the event.

- Belarus (1)
- Hungary (1)
- Italy (1)
- Lithuania (1)
- Netherlands (2)
- Romania (1)
- Russia (2)
- Spain (2)
- Turkey (1)
- United Kingdom (2)
