= Romanian Athletics Championships =

Annual track and field competition

- Sport: Track and field
- Founded: 1914
- Country: Romania

The Romanian Athletics Championships (Romanian: Campionat National de Atletism Romania) is an annual outdoor track and field competition organised by the Romanian Athletics Federation, which serves as the national championship for the sport in Romania.

Typically organised in July, the event was first held in 1914 and introduced the first events for women in 1925. Separate annual championship events are held for cross country running, road running and racewalking events.

== Events ==
The competition programme features a total of 38 individual Romanian Championship athletics events, 19 for men and 19 for women. For each of the sexes, there are seven track running events, three obstacle events, four jumps, four throws, and one combined track and field event.

Track running

- 100 metres, 200 metres, 400 metres, 800 metres, 1500 metres, 5000 metres, 10,000 metres

Obstacle events

- 100 metres hurdles (women only), 110 metres hurdles (men only), 400 metres hurdles, 3000 metres steeplechase

Jumping events

- Pole vault, high jump, long jump, triple jump

Throwing events

- Shot put, discus throw, javelin throw, hammer throw

Combined events

- Decathlon (men only), Heptathlon (women only)

A men's 200 metres hurdles was held at earlier championships, but ceased after 1964.

The women's programme gradually expanded in the second half of the 20th century. On the track, the women's 1500 m was added in 1969, the 3000 metres in 1973 and the 10,000 metres in 1983. The 3000 m was replaced by the 5000 m in 1995, matching the men's distance. The 80 metres hurdles was standardised to 100 m hurdles in 1969 and a women's 400 m hurdles followed in 1973. In the field events, triple jump was included in 1990, and the hammer throw and pole vault in 1991. A 2000 metres steeplechase was held from 1991 to 1997, before being replaced by the standard 3000 m distance. In combined events, the women's pentathlon was expanded to the heptathlon format in 1980.

== Championships records ==
=== Men ===
Event	Record	Athlete/Team	Date	Place	Ref.
400 m	45.38 NR	Mihai Dringo	25 June 2022	Craiova	
Shot put	21.07 m NR	Andrei Toader	26 June 2022	Craiova	
