= Ramil Guliyev =

Azerbaijani-born Turkish sprinter

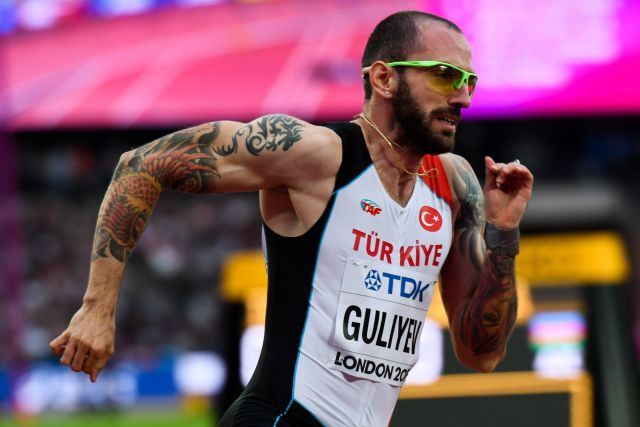
- Ramil Guliyev at the 2017 World Athletics Championships in London

Personal information
- Full name: Ramil Eldar oğlu Quliyev
- Nationality: Azerbaijani (Azerbaijan); Turkish (Turkey)
- Born: 29 May 1990 (age 36) Baku, Azerbaijan SSR
- Height: 1.87 m (6 ft 2 in)
- Weight: 80 kg (176 lb)

Sport
- Sport: Track and field
- Events: Sprints: 100 m, 200 m
- Club: Fenerbahçe Athletics
- Coached by: Eldar Guliyev(2004-2010); Oleg Mukhin (2010–present)

Achievements and titles
- Personal bests: 100 m: 9.97 (Bursa, 2017); 200 m: 19.76 (Berlin, 2018)
Medal record
Men's athletics
Representing Turkey
World Championships
Gold medal – first place	2017 London	200 m
European Championships
Gold medal – first place	2018 Berlin	200 m
Silver medal – second place	2016 Amsterdam	200 m
Silver medal – second place	2018 Berlin	4 × 100 m relay
European Team Championships
Silver medal – second place	2014 Braunschweig	200 m
Bronze medal – third place	2014 Braunschweig	100 m
Mediterranean Games
Gold medal – first place	2018 Tarragona	200 m
Gold medal – first place	2022 Oran	200 m
Silver medal – second place	2013 Mersin	100 m
Silver medal – second place	2013 Mersin	200 m
Silver medal – second place	2018 Tarragona	4 × 100 m relay
Silver medal – second place	2022 Oran	100 m
Silver medal – second place	2022 Oran	4 × 100 m relay
Islamic Solidarity Games
Gold medal – first place	2017 Baku	100 m
Gold medal – first place	2017 Baku	200 m
Gold medal – first place	2021 Konya	4 × 100 m relay
Silver medal – second place	2017 Baku	4 × 100 m relay
Silver medal – second place	2021 Konya	200 m
Balkan Championships
Gold medal – first place	2014 Pitești	100 m
Gold medal – first place	2014 Pitești	200 m
Gold medal – first place	2015 Pitești	200 m
Gold medal – first place	2015 Pitești	4 × 100 m relay
Gold medal – first place	2016 Pitești	100 m
Gold medal – first place	2016 Pitești	200 m
Universiade
Bronze medal – third place	2015 Gwangju	100 m
Bronze medal – third place	2015 Gwangju	200 m
Representing Azerbaijan
Universiade
Gold medal – first place	2009 Belgrade	200 m
European Junior Championships
Gold medal – first place	2009 Novisad	200 m
Silver medal – second place	2009 Novisad	100 m
World Youth Championships
Silver medal – second place	2007 Ostrava	200 m
European Youth Olympic Festival
Gold medal – first place	2007 Belgrade	100 m
Gold medal – first place	2007 Belgrade	200 m
Representing Europe
Continental Cup
Silver medal – second place	2018 Ostrava	200 m
Silver medal – second place	2018 Ostrava	4 × 100 m relay

Ramil Guliyev (Azerbaijani: Ramil Eldar oğlu Quliyev; born 29 May 1990) is an Azerbaijani-born Turkish sprinter. He competes in the 100 metres and 200 metres. At the 2017 World Championships, Guliyev became the World Champion in the 200 metres, winning Turkey's first ever gold medal in the World Championships. His club is Fenerbahçe Athletics. In 2018, he won the gold medal in the 200 metres at the European Championships.

== Career ==
He competed at the 2009 European Athletics Junior Championships, winning a silver medal in the 100 m and a gold medal in the 200 m. He also competed in Berlin at the 2009 World Championships in Athletics, finishing seventh at the age of 19 when Usain Bolt set his world record at 200 m.

He holds the national and national junior records in both events. He is also the 200 m European junior record holder and national junior record holder in the 60 metres. His 200 m time is the second fastest by a junior athlete, after Usain Bolt's 19.93 sec. He came second in the men's European Athletics Rising Star of the Year Award for his achievements in 2009.

=== Move to Turkey ===
In April 2011, the IAAF enacted a transfer delay in line with its international rules, banning Guliyev from representing any country other than Azerbaijan until April 2014. The runner argued that the training and financial support that he received in Turkey was significant, and that the people, language, and culture were very similar between the two countries, though his home federation remained open to him representing Azerbaijan internationally again. Following negotiations with the Azerbaijani Ministry of Youth and Sports, Guliyev confirmed his original decision not to compete for Azerbaijan. Azerbaijan's Minister of Youth and Sports Azad Rahimov explained this by Guliyev's putting forward too unreasonable financial demands for a young athlete and expressed doubt that Guliyev's representation of Turkey in the 2012 Summer Olympics would be successful.

In June 2014, he competed at the European Athletics Team Championships Super League for Turkey in Braunschweig, Germany, and won the bronze medal in the 100 metres event with 10.37 and the silver medal in the 200 metres event with 20.57.

On September 8, 2015, he ran the 200 metres race, part of the Hanžeković Memorial in Zagreb timed in 19.88. At the time that ranked him tied for the 34th best performer of all time and #6 for 2015. In July 2017, he became the second white person in history to have officially broken the 10-second barrier in terms of speed after Christophe Lemaitre.

On August 10, 2017, he won the men's 200 metre race at the London 2017 IAAF World Championship in a time of 20.09.

After his historic success he stated that "if not for Fenerbahçe, I would have probably quit athletics a long time ago. All my achievements are thanks to my club."

He won the gold medal at the 2018 European Championships with a time 19.76 s, setting the new championships record.

== Coach ==
Guliyev's second coach was Eldar Guliyev. He was trained by his father until the latter's death from a heart attack in June 2010.

== Statistics ==
=== Personal bests ===
Event	Time	Competition	Venue	Date	Notes
60 metres	6.58		Sumy, Ukraine	13 January 2012	
100 metres	9.97	Turkish Club Championships	Bursa, Turkey	6 July 2017	
200 metres	19.76	European Championships	Berlin, Germany	9 August 2018	NR CR
300 metres	32.61	Folksam Grand Prix	Karlstad, Sweden	27 July 2016	
4 × 100 metres relay	37.98	European Championships	Berlin, Germany	12 August 2018	NR
4 × 200 metres relay	1:23.55	World Relays	Nassau, Bahamas	3 May 2015	NR

- All information from IAAF profile.

=== International competitions ===
Year	Competition	Venue	Position	Event	Notes
Representing Azerbaijan
2006	World Junior Championships	Beijing, China	58th (h)	100 m	10.91
2007	World Youth Championships	Ostrava, Czech Republic	2nd	200 m	20.72
2007	European Youth Olympic Festival	Belgrade, Serbia	1st	100 m	10.50 w
2007	European Youth Olympic Festival	Belgrade, Serbia	1st	200 m	20.98 GR
2008	World Indoor Championships	Valencia, Spain	27th (h)	60 m	6.84
2008	World Junior Championships	Bydgoszcz, Poland	5th	200 m	21.00
2008	Olympic Games	Beijing, China	24th (qf)	200 m	20.66 NR PB
2009	European Indoor Championships	Turin, Italy	7th	60 m	6.67
2009	Universiade	Belgrade, Serbia	1st	200 m	20.04 NR PB
2009	European Junior Championships	Novi Sad, Serbia	2nd	100 m	10.16
2009	European Junior Championships	Novi Sad, Serbia	1st	200 m	20.33 CR
2009	World Championships	Berlin, Germany	7th	200 m	20.61
Representing Turkey
2013	Mediterranean Games	Mersin, Turkey	2nd	100 m	10.23 SB
2013	Mediterranean Games	Mersin, Turkey	2nd	200 m	20.46 SB
2013	Universiade	Kazan, Russia	8th (sf)	200 m	20.84
2014	European Team Championships	Braunschweig, Germany	3rd	100 m	10.37
2014	European Team Championships	Braunschweig, Germany	2nd	200 m	20.57
2014	European Team Championships	Braunschweig, Germany	11th	4 × 100 m relay	40.25
2014	Balkan Championships	Pitești, Romania	1st	100 m	10.24
2014	Balkan Championships	Pitești, Romania	1st	200 m	21.04
2014	European Championships	Zürich, Switzerland	–	100 m	DQ
2014	European Championships	Zürich, Switzerland	6th	200 m	20.48
2014	European Championships	Zürich, Switzerland	14th (h)	4 × 100 m relay	39.83 PB
2015	World Relays	Nassau, Bahamas	9th (h)	4 × 200 m relay	1:23.55 NR PB
2015	European Team Championships	Heraklion, Greece	1st	200 m	20.67 SB
2015	Universiade	Gwangju, South Korea	3rd	100 m	10.16
2015	Universiade	Gwangju, South Korea	3rd	200 m	20.59 SB
2015	Balkan Championships	Pitești, Romania	1st	200 m	20.59
2015	Balkan Championships	Pitești, Romania	1st	4 × 100 m relay	39.35 PB
2015	World Championships	Beijing, China	6th	200 m	20.11
2016	Balkan Championships	Pitești, Romania	1st	100 m	10.30
2016	Balkan Championships	Pitești, Romania	1st	200 m	20.98
2016	European Championships	Amsterdam, Netherlands	6th	100 m	10.23
2016	European Championships	Amsterdam, Netherlands	2nd	200 m	20.51
2016	European Championships	Amsterdam, Netherlands	14th (h)	4 × 100 m relay	39.58
2016	Olympic Games	Rio de Janeiro, Brazil	8th	200 m	20.43
2016	Olympic Games	Rio de Janeiro, Brazil	10th (h)	4 × 100 m relay	38.30 PB
2017	Islamic Solidarity Games	Baku, Azerbaijan	1st	100 m	10.06 PB GR
2017	Islamic Solidarity Games	Baku, Azerbaijan	1st	200 m	20.08 SB GR
2017	Islamic Solidarity Games	Baku, Azerbaijan	2nd	4 × 100 m relay	39.56
2017	European Team Championships	Vaasa, Finland	1st	200 m	20.20 CR
2017	World Championships	London, England	1st	200 m	20.09
2017	World Championships	London, England	7th	4 × 100 m relay	38.73
2018	Mediterranean Games	Tarragona, Spain	1st	200 m	20.15 GR
2018	Mediterranean Games	Tarragona, Spain	2nd	4 × 100 m relay	38.50
2018	European Championships	Berlin, Germany	1st	200 m	19.76 NR PB CR
2018	European Championships	Berlin, Germany	2nd	4 × 100 m relay	37.98 NR PB
2018	Continental Cup	Ostrava, Czech Republic	2nd	200 m	20.28^{1}
2018	Continental Cup	Ostrava, Czech Republic	2nd	4 × 100 m relay	38.96^{1}
2019	World Relays	Yokohama, Japan	7th	4 × 100 m relay	39.13
2019	World Championships	Doha, Qatar	5th	200 m	20.07
2019	World Championships	Doha, Qatar	–	4 × 100 m relay	DQ
2021	World Relays	Chorzów, Poland	14th (h)	4 × 100 m relay	39.59
2021	Olympic Games	Tokyo, Japan	14th (sf)	200 m	20.31
2021	Olympic Games	Tokyo, Japan	–	4 × 100 m relay	DQ
2022	Mediterranean Games	Oran, Algeria	2nd	100 m	10.16
2022	Mediterranean Games	Oran, Algeria	1st	200 m	20.21
2022	Mediterranean Games	Oran, Algeria	2nd	4 × 100 m relay	38.98
2022	Islamic Solidarity Games	Konya, Turkey	2nd	200 m	20.24
2022	Islamic Solidarity Games	Konya, Turkey	1st	4 × 100 m relay	38.74
2022	European Championships	Munich, Germany	9th (sf)	200 m	20.44^{2}
2023	World Championships	Budapest, Hungary	38th (h)	200 m	20.89
2024	European Championships	Rome, Italy	17th (sf)	200 m	20.87

^{1}Representing Europe

^{2}Did not finish in the final

=== Circuit wins ===
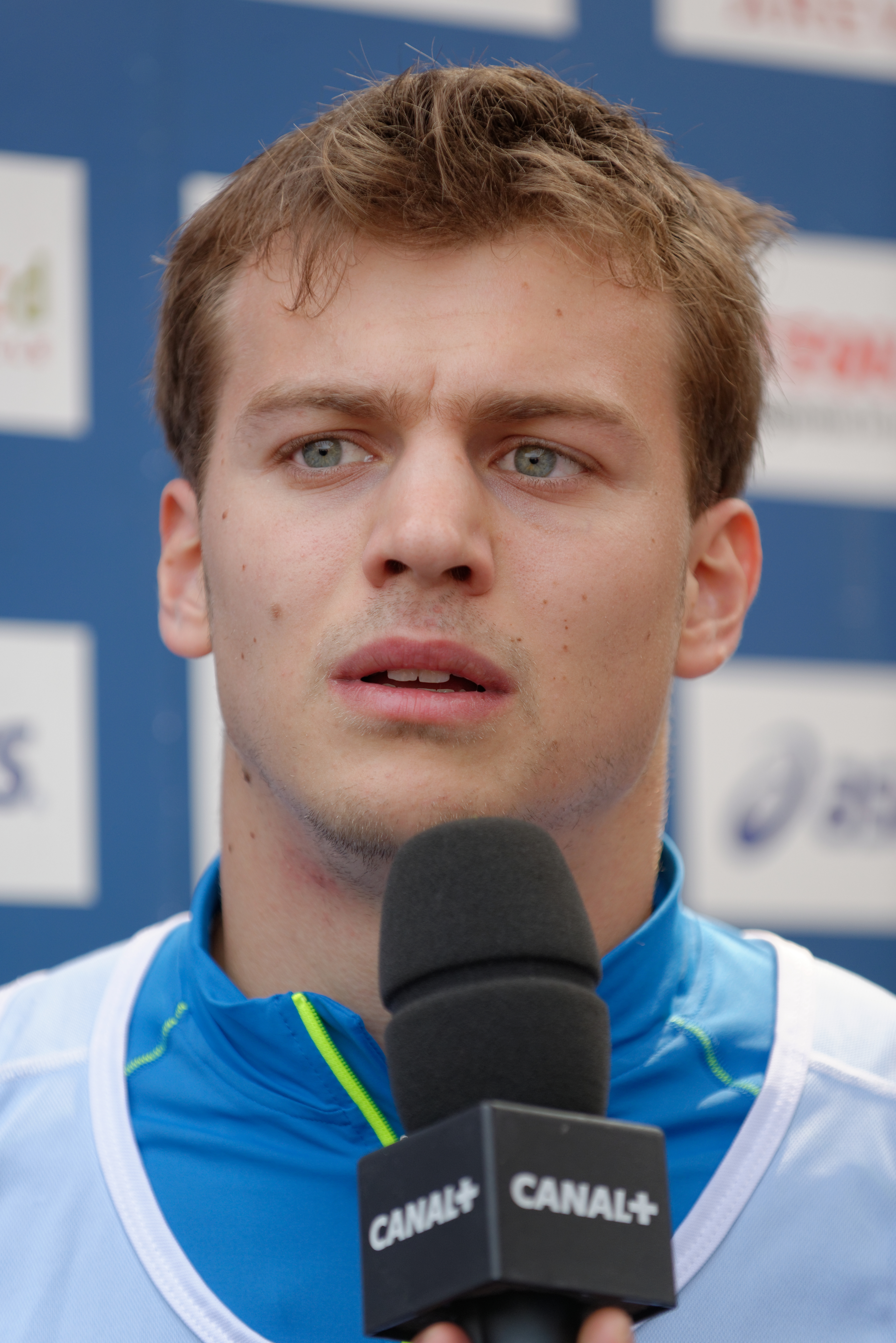
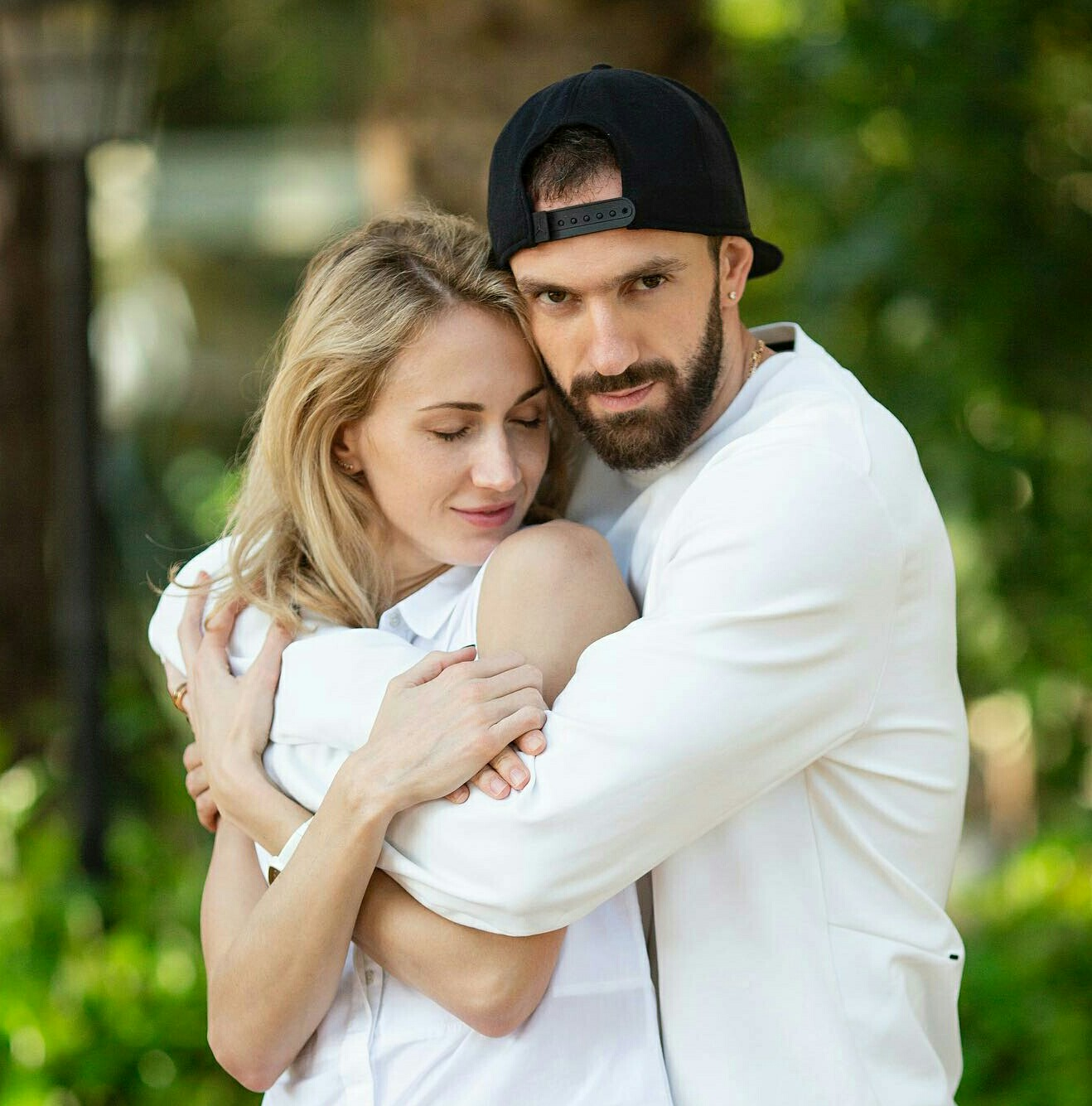
Christophe Lemaitre and Ramil Guliyev (right) were the first and second white athletes to run a sub-10 100m in 2010 and 2017 respectively.

==== 200 m ====
- IAAF Diamond League
  - Stockholm: 2018
  - Paris: 2017
  - Birmingham: 2017
  - Oslo: 2018
  - Doha: 2019

==== 4 × 100 m relay ====
- IAAF Diamond League
  - Stockholm: 2016

=== Track records ===
As of 6 September 2024, Guliyev holds the following track records for 100 metres and 200 metres.

==== 100 metres ====
Location	Time	Windspeed m/s	Date
Baku	10.06	+0.6	16/05/2017

==== 200 metres ====
Location	Time	Windspeed m/s	Date
Bursa	20.13	+2.2	07/07/2017
Šamorín	19.98	+7.1	17/06/2017
Zagreb	19.88	–0.4	08/09/2015

== World Rankings ==
Guiliyev was ranked among the best in the world in the 200 m sprint event in 2009 and in the period 2015 to 2019, according to the votes of the experts of Track and Field News.

Representing Azerbaijan:

200 meters
Year	World rank
2009	9th

Representing Turkey:

200 meters
Year	World rank
2015	7th
2016	-
2017	1st
2018	2nd
2019	3rd

== Awards ==
- 2017 Turkish Athlete of the Year
- 2018 Turkish Athlete of the Year
