= CSM Bacău =

CSM Bacău may refer to:

- CSM Bacău (football), a men's football club in Bacău, Romania
- CSM Bacău (men's handball), a men's handball club in Bacău, Romania
- CS Știința Bacău (women's volleyball), a women's handball club in Bacău, Romania
