= Balkan Athletics Championships =

Regional athletics competition

Balkan Athletics Championships Greek: Βαλκανικοί Αγώνες
- Poster of the first Balkan Games (1929)
- Purpose: Athletics event for nations of the Balkans
- Frequency: Every year (except 1941–1945, 1948-1952, 1987, 1991, 1993 and 1995)
- Inaugurated: 1929
- Most recent: 2025
- Next event: 2026
- Website: balkanathletics.org

The Balkan Athletics Championships or Balkan Games (Greek: Βαλκανικοί Αγώνες) is a regional athletics competition held between nations from the Balkans as well as other associated states, and organized by the Association of the Balkan Athletics Federations. The first games were held in Athens in 1929, and the most recent were being held in İzmir in 2024.

== Organization ==
The Games of 1929 were unofficial, and organized by the Hellenic Amateur Athletic Association (SEGAS). They became formalized after 1930 and have been held regularly since, with the exception of the 1940–1953 period due to the Second World War and post-war turmoil. In 1946 and 1947, unofficial Games were organized, under the name Balkan and Central European Games, which Czechoslovakia, Poland and Hungary (1947) also participated.

SEGAS were also central to the creation of the Balkan Athletics Indoor Championships in 1994 – a sister indoor event to the main outdoor competition.

== Balkan Games ==
Balkan Games was held 1953 - 1980s (See: Balkan Athletics Championships). In recent years separate Balkan Championships will be held instead of Games.

== Nations ==
- Greece (from 1929)
- Romania (from 1929)
- Bulgaria (from 1929)
- Turkey (from 1931)
- Albania (from 1946)
- Slovenia (from 1992)
- Croatia (from 1992)
- North Macedonia (from 1992)
- Bosnia and Herzegovina (from 1992)
- Moldova (from 1992)
- Montenegro (from 2006)
- Serbia (from 2006)
- Armenia (from 2013)
- Cyprus (from 2014)
- Georgia (from 2014)
- Israel (from 2015)
- Kosovo (from 2016)
- San Marino (from 2016)
- Ukraine (from 2016)
- Azerbaijan (from 2017)
- Austria (from 2018)
- Malta (from 2023)

=== Former nations ===
- Kingdom of Yugoslavia (1929–1940)
- Socialist Federal Republic of Yugoslavia (1953–1990)
- Serbia and Montenegro (1992–2005)

== Editions ==
Number	Year	Host City	Country	Events
Name:Balkan Games
	1929	Athens	Greece	
1	1930	Athens	Greece	
2	1931	Athens	Greece	
3	1932	Athens	Greece	
4	1933	Athens	Greece	
5	1934	Zagreb	Yugoslavia	
6	1935	Istanbul	Turkey	
7	1936	Athens	Greece	
8	1937	Bucharest	Romania	
9	1938	Belgrade	Yugoslavia	
10	1939	Athens	Greece	
11	1940	Istanbul	Turkey	
1941-1952: Not Held
	1946	Tirana	Albania	
	1947	Bucharest	Romania	
Name:Balkan Athletics Championships
12	1953	Athens	Greece	
13	1954	Belgrade	Yugoslavia	
14	1955	Istanbul	Turkey	
15	1956	Belgrade	Yugoslavia	
16	1957	Athens	Greece	
17	1958	Sofia	Bulgaria	
18	1959	Bucharest	Romania	
19	1960	Athens	Greece	
20	1961	Belgrade	Yugoslavia	
21	1962	Ankara	Turkey	
22	1963	Sofia	Bulgaria	
23	1964	Bucharest	Romania	
24	1965	Piraeus	Greece	
25	1966	Sarajevo	Yugoslavia	
26	1967	Istanbul	Turkey	
27	1968	Piraeus	Greece	
28	1969	Sofia	Bulgaria	
29	1970	Bucharest	Romania	
30	1971	Zagreb	Yugoslavia	
31	1972	İzmir	Turkey	
32	1973	Piraeus	Greece	
33	1974	Sofia	Bulgaria	
34	1975	Bucharest	Romania	
35	1976	Celje	Yugoslavia	
36	1977	Ankara	Turkey	
37	1978	Thessaloniki	Greece	
38	1979	Piraeus	Greece	
39	1980	Sofia	Bulgaria	
40	1981	Sarajevo	Yugoslavia	
41	1982	Bucharest	Romania	
42	1983	İzmir	Turkey	
43	1984	Athens	Greece	
44	1985	Stara Zagora	Bulgaria	
45	1986	Ljubljana	Yugoslavia	
46	1988	Ankara	Turkey	
47	1989	Serres	Greece	
48	1990	Istanbul	Turkey	
49	1992	Sofia	Bulgaria	
50	1994	Trikala	Greece	
51	1996	Niš	FR Yugoslavia	
52	1997	Athens	Greece	
53	1998	Belgrade	FR Yugoslavia	
54	1999	Istanbul	Turkey	
55	2000	Kavala	Greece	
56	2001	Trikala	Greece	
57	2002	Bucharest	Romania	
58	2003	Thiva	Greece	
59	2004	Istanbul	Turkey	
60	2005	Novi Sad	Serbia and Montenegro	
61	2006	Athens	Greece	
62	2007	Plovdiv	Bulgaria	
63	2008	Bar	Montenegro	
64	2009	İzmir	Turkey	
65	2010	Larissa	Greece	
66	2011	Sliven	Bulgaria	
67	2012	Eskişehir	Turkey	
68	2013	Stara Zagora	Bulgaria	
69	2014	Pitești	Romania	
70	2015	Pitești	Romania	
71	2016	Pitești	Romania	
72	2017	Novi Pazar	Serbia	
73	2018	Stara Zagora	Bulgaria	40
74	2019	Pravets	Bulgaria	40
75	2020	Cluj-Napoca	Romania	42
76	2021	Smederevo	Serbia	42
77	2022	Craiova	Romania	42
78	2023	Kraljevo	Serbia	42
79	2024	İzmir	Turkey	43
80	2025	Volos	Greece	43
81	2026	Volos	Greece	

== Ranking ==
Year	Ranking by Medals			
Year	1	2	3	Source
1930	Greece	Bulgaria	Yugoslavia	
1931	Greece	Yugoslavia	Romania	
1932-2021
2022	Greece	Romania	Turkey	
2023	Turkey	Serbia	Ukraine	

== Results ==
Full Results:

=== Medals (1930-2023) ===
Rank	Nation	Gold	Silver	Bronze	Total
1	Romania	754	699	641	2,094
2	Bulgaria	563	538	488	1,589
3	Greece	544	539	515	1,598
4	Yugoslavia	386	365	361	1,112
5	Turkey	165	215	271	651
6	Serbia	78	62	71	211
7	Serbia and Montenegro	37	57	78	172
8	Ukraine	35	34	17	86
9	Croatia	24	36	40	100
10	Moldova	22	43	43	108
11	Slovenia	17	13	20	50
12	Bosnia and Herzegovina	15	25	37	77
13	Albania	15	19	30	64
14	Cyprus	11	13	16	40
15	Austria	7	8	2	17
16	Montenegro	6	4	14	24
17	Armenia	6	3	2	11
18	Israel	3	10	12	25
19	North Macedonia	3	3	13	19
20	Authorised Neutral Athletes	1	6	11	18
21	Azerbaijan	1	0	0	1
22	Kosovo	0	5	1	6
23	Georgia	0	3	3	6
Totals (23 entries)		2,693	2,700	2,686	8,079

=== Indoor ===
Balkan Athletics Indoor Championships

=== Race Walking ===
Balkan Cross Country Championships

=== Cross Country ===
Balkan Race Walking Championships

=== Masters ===
Balkan Masters Athletics Championships

=== Others ===
1. Balkan Mountain Running Championships
2. Balkan Half Marathon Championships
3. Balkan Marathon Championships
4. Balkan Athletics U20 Championships
5. Balkan U20 Indoor Athletics Championships
6. Balkan U18 Athletics Championships
7. Balkan Relay Championships

== Championships records ==
=== Men ===
Event	Record	Athlete	Nationality	Date	Championships	Place	Ref.
100 m	10.11 (+0.5 m/s)	Jak Ali Harvey	Turkey	1 August 2015	2015 Championships	Pitești, Romania	
200 m	20.50 (−0.6 m/s)	Sergii Smelyk	Ukraine	3 September 2019	2019 Championships	Pravets, Bulgaria	
400 m	45.36	Oleksandr Pohorilko	Ukraine	22 July 2023	2023 Championships	Kraljevo, Serbia	
800 m	1:45.73	Luciano Sušanj	Yugoslavia	2 August 1974		Sofia, Bulgaria	
1500 m	3:40.40	Petre Lupan	Romania	5 August 1972		İzmir, Turkey	
5000 m	13:42.43	Michalis Kousis	Greece	1978		Thessaloniki, Greece	
110 m hurdles	13.28 (+0.9 m/s)	Milan Trajkovic	Cyprus	23 July 2023	2023 Championships	Kraljevo, Serbia	
400 m hurdles	48.71	Yasmani Copello	Turkey	22 July 2023	2023 Championships	Kraljevo, Serbia	
3000 m steeplechase	8:22.77	Florin Ionescu	Romania	28 June 1997		Athens, Greece	
High jump	2.31 m	Sorin Matei	Romania	16 July 1988		Ankara, Turkey	
Pole vault	5.92 m	Emmanouil Karalis	Greece	27 July 2025	2025 Championships	Volos, Greece	
Long jump	8.36 m (−0.3 m/s)	Miltiadis Tentoglou	Greece	20 June 2026	2026 Championships	Volos, Greece	
Triple jump	17.24 m	Marian Oprea	Romania	13 July 2003; 28 July 2013		Thebes, Greece; Stara Zagora	
Shot put	21.50 m	Armin Sinančević	Serbia	26 June 2021	2021 Championships	Smederevo, Serbia	
Discus throw	65.44 m	Ion Zamfirache	Romania	15 August 1982		Bucharest, Romania	
Javelin throw	83.60 m	Andrian Mardare	Moldova	20 September 2020	2020 Championships	Cluj-Napoca, Romania	
Hammer throw	79.16 m	Aléxandros Papadimitríou	Greece	12 July 2003		Thebes, Greece	
Decathlon	7995 pts	Saša Karan	Yugoslavia	1990		Istanbul, Turkey	
4 × 100 m relay	39.09	Ertan Ozkan; Kayhan Ozer; Batuhan Altintaş; Ramil Guliyev	Turkey	22 July 2023	2023 Championships	Kraljevo, Serbia	
4 × 400 m relay	3:03.94		Yugoslavia	17 July 1988		Ankara, Turkey	

=== Women ===
Event	Record	Athlete	Nationality	Date	Championships	Place	Ref.
100 m	10.96 (+0.8 m/s)	Ivet Lalova	Bulgaria	2 July 2011		Sliven	
200 m	22.45 (+1.2 m/s)	Ivet Lalova-Collio	Bulgaria	3 September 2019	2019 Championships	Pravets, Bulgaria	
400 m	50.98	Jelica Pavličić	Yugoslavia	3 August 1974		Sofia	
800 m	1:56.42	Paula Ivan	Romania	16 July 1988		Ankara	
1500 m	4:04.56	Corina Dumbrăvean	Romania	24 July 2005		Novi Sad	
5000 m	15:16.47	Luiza Gega	Albania	20 June 2022	2022 Championships	Craiova, Romania	
100 m hurdles	12.26	Yordanka Donkova	Bulgaria	7 September 1986		Ljubljana	
400 m hurdles	54.23	Vania Stambolova	Bulgaria	2 July 2011		Sliven	
3000 m steeplechase	9:17.89	Luiza Gega	Albania	19 June 2022	2022 Championships	Craiova, Romania	
High jump	2.01 m	Stefka Kostadinova	Bulgaria	6 September 1986		Ljubljana	
Pole vault	4.48 m	Katerina Stefanidi	Greece	20 June 2026	2026 Championships	Volos, Greece	
Long jump	7.14 m (+1.2 m/s)	Mirela Dulgheru	Romania	5 July 1992		Sofia	
Triple jump	14.60 m (+1.7 m/s)	Paraskevi Papachristou	Greece	20 July 2018	2018 Championships	Stara Zagora, Bulgaria	
Shot put	21.11 m	Verzhinia Veselinova	Bulgaria	14 June 1980		Sofia	
Discus throw	70.20 m	Daniela Costian	Romania	17 July 1988		Ankara	
Hammer throw	73.97 m	Zalina Marghieva	Moldova	2 August 2015	2015 Championships	Pitești, Romania	
Javelin throw	62.83 m	Elina Tzengko	Greece	26 July 2025	2025 Championships	Volos, Greece	
Heptathlon	6304 pts	Emilia Dimitrova	Bulgaria	7 September 1986		Ljubljana	
4 × 100 m relay	42.89		Bulgaria	1988		Ankara	
4 × 400 m relay	3:27.39		Romania	1985		Stara Zagora	

== 1940 athlete naming ==
The 1940 shot put champion was listed as Arat Ararat from Turkey. The birth name of this athlete was Sokratis Ioannidis, a Greek Orthodox born in Istanbul. Due to political friction between Turkey and Greece at that time, the Turks decided it would be more politically correct to change his name to Arat Ararat. This was the name he was known by in the athletic circles.

== See also ==
- Balkan Cup
- Balkans Cup
- Balkan Basketball Championship
- BVA Cup
- Balkan Swimming Championship
- Balkan Badminton Championships
- Balkan Mathematical Olympiad
