= Silvia Danekova =

Olympic steeplechaser from Bulgaria

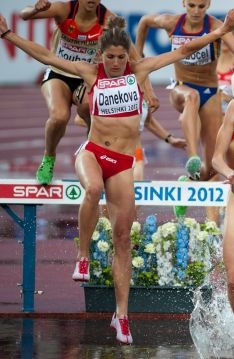
Silvia Danekova at the 2012 European Championships

Silvia Danekova (Bulgarian: Силвия Дънекова; born 7 February 1983 in Kotel) is a Bulgarian athlete.

== Career ==
She competed in the 3000 metres steeplechase at the 2012 Summer Olympics, placing 38th with a time of 9:59.52.

Danekova was scheduled to compete in the 2016 Summer Olympics but was provisionally suspended after a failed A-sample test given a few days after her arrival in Brazil. Her doping violation was later confirmed and she was handed a 4-year ban which ended on 12 August 2020.

== Competition record ==
Year	Competition	Venue	Position	Event	Notes
Representing Bulgaria
2010	World Half Marathon Championships	Nanning, China	46th	3000 m s'chase	1:21:21
2012	European Championships	Helsinki, Finland	11th	3000 m s'chase	9:51.45
2012	Olympic Games	London, United Kingdom	38th (h)	3000 m s'chase	9:59.52
2012	World Half Marathon Championships	Kavarna, Bulgaria	55th	21.1 km	1:24:07
2013	European Indoor Championships	Gothenburg, Sweden	17th (h)	1500 m	4:17.62
2013	World Championships	Moscow, Russia	14th	3000 m s'chase	9:58.57
2013	2013 Sofia Marathon	Sofia, Bulgaria	1st	42.2 km	2:52.27
2014	European Championships	Zürich, Switzerland	8th	3000 m s'chase	9:44.81
2015	European Indoor Championships	Prague, Czech Republic	11th	1500 m	4:25.44
2015	World Championships	Beijing, China	28th (h)	3000 m s'chase	9:46.31

== Personal bests ==
Outdoor

- 3000 metres steeplechase – 9:35.66 (Moscow 2013)
- Half marathon – 1:15:02 (Albi 2005)
- Marathon – 2:52:27 (Sofia 2013)

Indoor

- 1500 metres – 4:16.04 (Istanbul 2015)
