= Mateo Ružić =

Croatian sprinter (born 1994)

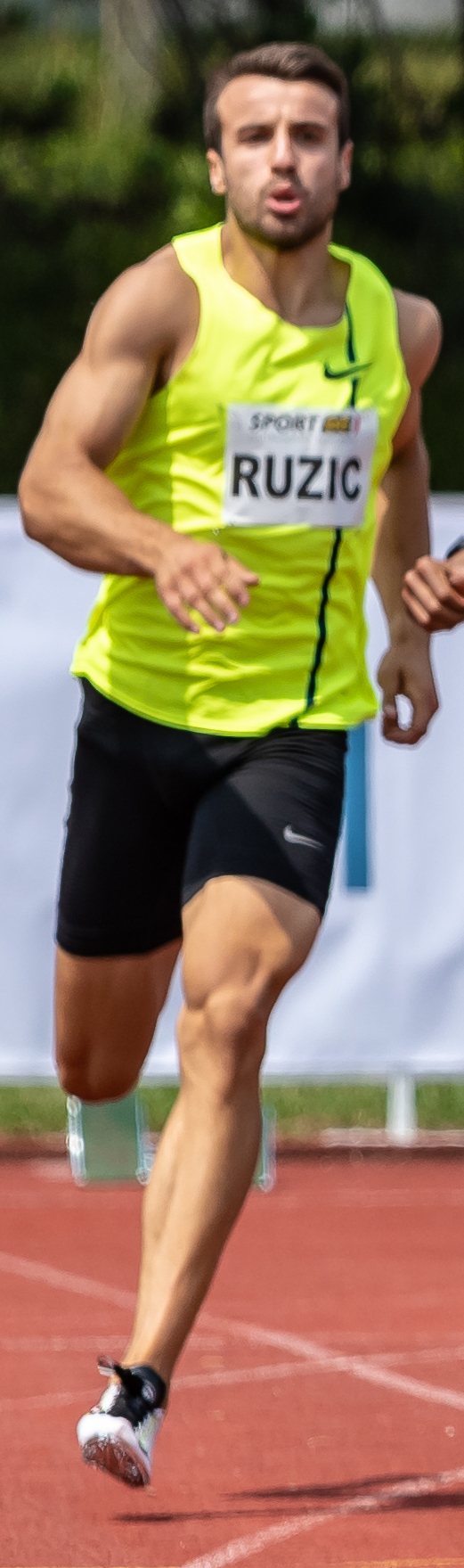
- Mateo Ružić in 2018

Personal information
- Born: 16 July 1994 (age 31)
- Education: University of Zagreb

Sport
- Sport: Athletics
- Event: 400 metres

Mateo Ružić (born 16 August 1994) is a Croatian sprinter specialising in the 400 metres. He has represented his country at two outdoor and two indoor European Championships.

== International competitions ==
Year	Competition	Venue	Position	Event	Notes
Representing Croatia
2011	World Youth Championships	Lille, France	23rd (sf)	400 m	50.57
2012	World Junior Championships	Barcelona, Spain	19th (sf)	400 m	47.46
2013	European Indoor Championships	Gothenburg, Sweden	11th (sf)	400 m	47.42
2013	European Junior Championships	Rieti, Italy	4th	400 m	46.84
2013	European Junior Championships	Rieti, Italy	–	4 × 400 m relay	DQ
2014	European Championships	Zürich, Switzerland	36th (h)	400 m	47.06
2014	European Championships	Zürich, Switzerland	15th (h)	4 × 400 m relay	3:12.73
2016	European Championships	Amsterdam, Netherlands	23rd (sf)	400 m	47.19
2017	European Indoor Championships	Belgrade, Serbia	16th (h)	400 m	47.66
2017	Universiade	Taipei, Taiwan	14th (sf)	400 m	46.90
2018	European Championships	Berlin, Germany	27th (h)	400 m	47.32
2018	European Championships	Berlin, Germany	12th (h)	4 × 400 m relay	3:07.80
2019	Universiade	Naples, Italy	23rd (sf)	400 m	48.09
2021	European Indoor Championships	Toruń, Poland	26th (h)	400 m	47.49
2022	Mediterranean Games	Oran, Algeria	16th (h)	400 m	47.79

== Personal bests ==
Outdoor

- 200 metres – 21.37 (-0.3 m/s, Novo Mesto 2017)
- 400 metres – 46.13 (Velenje 2017)
- 400 metres hurdles – 51.49 (Zagreb 2016)

Indoor

- 200 metres – 22.01 (Vienna 2014)
- 400 metres – 46.74 (Linz 2017)
