= Ioan Zaizan =

Romanian middle-distance runner

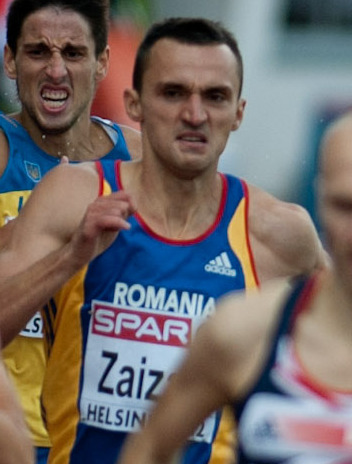

Personal information
- Nationality: Romanian
- Born: 21 July 1983 (age 43)

Sport
- Sport: Track and field
- Event: 1500m

Ioan Zaizan (born 21 July 1983) is a Romanian middle-distance runner. He competed in the 1500 metres event at the 2014 IAAF World Indoor Championships.

Zaizan is married to Romanian sprinter Alina Panainte.

Holds 50 national titles and makes a living career out of sports.

== Competition record ==
Year	Competition	Venue	Position	Event	Notes
Representing Romania
2003	European U23 Championships	Bydgoszcz, Poland	13th (h)	800 m	1:50.05
2003	European U23 Championships	Bydgoszcz, Poland	–	1500 m	DNF
2003	Universiade	Daegu, South Korea	4th	800 m	1:48.85
2005	Jeux de la Francophonie	Niamey, Niger	5th	1500 m	3:49.40
2007	Universiade	Bangkok, Thailand	6th	800 m	1:46.99
2012	European Championships	Helsinki, Finland	21st (sf)	800 m	1:49.91
2013	European Indoor Championships	Gothenburg, Sweden	13th (h)	1500 m	3:45.46
2014	World Indoor Championships	Sopot, Poland	–	1500 m	DQ
