= Athletics at the 2006 Asian Games – Men's shot put =

Men's shot put at the 2006 Asian Games
- Venue: Khalifa International Stadium
- Date: 11 December 2006
- Competitors: 14 from 11 nations

Medalists
gold medal	Sultan Al-Hebshi	Saudi Arabia
silver medal	Khalid Habash Al-Suwaidi	Qatar
bronze medal	Chang Ming-huang	Chinese Taipei

The men's shot put competition at the 2006 Asian Games in Doha, Qatar was held on 11 December 2006 at the Khalifa International Stadium.

== Schedule ==
All times are Arabia Standard Time (UTC+03:00)

Date	Time	Event
Monday, 11 December 2006	16:30	Final

== Records ==
Prior to this competition, the existing world, Asian and Games records were as follows.

World Record	Randy Barnes (USA)	23.12	Los Angeles, United States	20 May 1990
Asian Record	Khalid Habash Al-Suwaidi (QAT)	20.54	Minsk, Belarus	25 June 2005
Games Record	Liu Hao (CHN)	19.26	Hiroshima, Japan	14 October 1994

== Results ==
Rank	Athlete	Attempt						Result	Notes
Rank	Athlete	1	2	3	4	5	6	Result	Notes
1st place, gold medalist(s)	Sultan Al-Hebshi (KSA)	19.96	X	X	20.42	19.83	X	20.42	GR
2nd place, silver medalist(s)	Khalid Habash Al-Suwaidi (QAT)	19.98	20.05	19.29	X	X	X	20.05	
3rd place, bronze medalist(s)	Chang Ming-huang (TPE)	19.22	X	X	18.66	19.45	18.80	19.45	
4	Navpreet Singh (IND)	18.80	18.94	18.33	X	18.62	18.99	18.99	
5	Zhang Qi (CHN)	18.49	X	X	X	X	X	18.49	
6	Ahmad Gholoum (KUW)	17.95	18.26	X	18.03	18.06	18.13	18.26	
7	Vikas Gowda (IND)	17.72	X	18.09	X	X	X	18.09	
8	Mehdi Shahrokhi (IRI)	17.26	X	17.50	X	X	17.50	17.50	
9	Satoshi Hatase (JPN)	17.36	16.88	17.15				17.36	
10	Mashari Suroor (KUW)	17.22	17.15	X				17.22	
11	Shon Hyun (KOR)	16.65	16.45	X				16.65	
12	Chatchawal Polyiam (THA)	16.47	X	X				16.47	
13	Sarayudh Pinitjit (THA)	15.82	15.66	15.97				15.97	
14	Mohammed Al-Badwi (YEM)	11.69	X	11.93				11.93	
