= Athletics at the 2014 Asian Games – Men's shot put =

Men's shot put at the 2014 Asian Games
- Venue: Incheon Asiad Main Stadium
- Dates: 2 October 2014
- Competitors: 13 from 11 nations

Medalists
gold medal	Sultan Al-Hebshi	Saudi Arabia
silver medal	Chang Ming-huang	Chinese Taipei
bronze medal	Inderjeet Singh	India

The men's shot put event at the 2014 Asian Games was held at the Incheon Asiad Main Stadium, Incheon, South Korea on 2 October.

== Schedule ==
All times are Korea Standard Time (UTC+09:00)

Date	Time	Event
Thursday, 2 October 2014	20:30	Final

== Records ==
Prior to this competition, the existing world, Asian and Games records were as follows.

World Record	Randy Barnes (USA)	23.12	Los Angeles, United States	20 May 1990
Asian Record	Sultan Al-Hebshi (KSA)	21.13	Doha, Qatar	8 May 2009
Games Record	Sultan Al-Hebshi (KSA)	20.57	Guangzhou, China	26 November 2010

== Results ==
Legend

- DNS — Did not start

Rank	Athlete	Attempt						Result	Notes
Rank	Athlete	1	2	3	4	5	6	Result	Notes
1st place, gold medalist(s)	Sultan Al-Hebshi (KSA)	18.37	19.11	X	19.54	19.99	X	19.99	
2nd place, silver medalist(s)	Chang Ming-huang (TPE)	19.05	19.97	X	X	19.70	X	19.97	
3rd place, bronze medalist(s)	Inderjeet Singh (IND)	17.19	18.52	18.52	18.14	19.63	X	19.63	
4	Amin Nikfar (IRI)	17.13	18.64	18.35	19.02	18.69	X	19.02	
5	Ahmad Gholoum (KUW)	17.91	18.71	17.66	18.08	17.93	17.81	18.71	
6	Mashari Suroor (KUW)	18.04	18.35	18.64	X	—	—	18.64	
7	Wang Guangfu (CHN)	18.51	18.48	X	18.42	18.13	X	18.51	
8	Jung Il-woo (KOR)	17.62	18.17	17.48	17.63	18.08	X	18.17	
9	Om Prakash Karhana (IND)	16.26	16.94	X				16.94	
10	Sergey Dementev (UZB)	X	X	15.66				15.66	
11	Thawat Khachin (THA)	15.30	X	15.50				15.50	
12	Tejen Hommadow (TKM)	14.93	15.16	14.61				15.16	
—	Khalid Habash Al-Suwaidi (QAT)							DNS	
