= 2019 Asian Athletics Championships – Men's shot put =

Men's shot put at the 2019 Asian Athletics Championships
- Venue: Khalifa International Stadium
- Location: Doha, Qatar
- Dates: 22 April
- Competitors: 14 from 12 nations
- Winning distance: 20.22 m

Medalists
gold medal	Tejinder Pal Singh Toor	India
silver medal	Zhu Yaming	China
bronze medal	Ivan Ivanov	Kazakhstan

The men's shot put at the 2019 Asian Athletics Championships was held on 22 April.

== Records ==
Records before the 2019 Asian Athletics Championships
Record	Athlete (nation)	Distance (m)	Location	Date
World record	Randy Barnes (USA)	23.12	Los Angeles, United States	20 May 1990
Asian record	Sultan Al-Hebshi (KSA)	21.13	Doha, Qatar	8 May 2009
Championship record	Inderjeet Singh (IND)	20.41	Wuhan, China	3 June 2015
World leading	Ryan Crouser (USA)	22.74	Long Beach, United States	20 April 2019
Asian leading	Tajinderpal Singh Toor (IND)	20.13	Patiala, India	23 February 2019

== Results ==
Rank	Name	Nationality	#1	#2	#3	#4	#5	#6	Result	Notes
1st place, gold medalist(s)	Tejinder Pal Singh Toor	India	20.22	19.63	19.78	19.41	19.30	19.55	20.22	
2nd place, silver medalist(s)	Wu Jiaxing	China	x	19.38	20.03	19.30	x	x	20.03	PB
3rd place, bronze medalist(s)	Ivan Ivanov	Kazakhstan	19.09	x	x	x	x	18.75	19.09	
4	Shahin Mehrdelan	Iran	18.20	x	18.28	x	18.71	18.46	18.71	SB
5	Abdelrahman Mahmoud	Bahrain	x	17.91	18.48	18.68	17.89	17.98	18.68	NR
6	Jung Il-woo	South Korea	17.18	17.63	18.12	18.64	x	x	18.64	
7	Meshari Saad Suroor	Kuwait	18.46	18.10	18.57	x	18.30	18.62	18.62	
8	Li Jun	China	18.12	x	18.24	18.23	18.14	18.08	18.24	
9	Daichi Nakamura	Japan	17.51	x	x				17.51	
10	Ebrahim Al-Fadhli	Kuwait	x	16.90	x				16.90	SB
11	Sergey Dementev	Uzbekistan	16.27	x	x				16.27	
12	Phan Thanh Bình	Vietnam	15.44	x	16.08				16.08	SB
13	Musaeb Al-Momani	Jordan	15.98	16.00	x				16.00	
14	Rashid Ali Al-Khulaifi	Qatar	14.44	x	x				14.44	SB
