= 2013 Asian Athletics Championships – Men's shot put =

The men's shot put at the 2013 Asian Athletics Championships was held at the Shree Shiv Chhatrapati Sports Complex on 3 July.

== Results ==
Rank	Name	Nationality	#1	#2	#3	#4	#5	#6	Result	Notes
1st place, gold medalist(s)	Sultan Al-Hebshi	Saudi Arabia	18.51	18.95	19.14	19.60	19.68	x	19.68	
2nd place, silver medalist(s)	Chang Ming-huang	Chinese Taipei	19.29	19.16	x	19.38	19.61	x	19.61	
3rd place, bronze medalist(s)	Om Prakash Singh Karhana	India	19.18	19.45	19.08	x	19.41	19.05	19.45	
4	Inderjeet Singh	India	18.61	19.31	x	18.46	18.15	18.63	19.31	
5	Wang Guangfu	China	x	18.94	x	18.76	x	18.69	18.94	
6	Sergey Dementev	Uzbekistan	17.35	18.59	x	x	x	x	18.59	
7	Ivan Ivanov	Kazakhstan	16.93	17.62	18.07	18.34	17.65	x	18.34	
8	Satyendra Singh	India	17.10	18.01	x	17.36	17.57	17.66	18.01	
9	Alireza Mehrsafoti	Iran	17.50	17.95	17.94				17.94	
10	Zhang Jun	China	17.82	x	17.41				17.82	
11	Grigoriy Kamulya	Uzbekistan	x	16.79	17.82				17.82	
12	Musaeb Al-Momani	Jordan	17.75	x	17.40				17.75	
13	Krisna Wahyu Permana	Indonesia	15.11	14.92	14.86				15.11	
	Tejen Hommadov	Turkmenistan							DNS	
	Meshari Mohammad	Kuwait							DNS	
