= 2011 Asian Athletics Championships – Men's shot put =

The Men's shot put event took place on July 9, 2011, at the Kobe Universiade Memorial Stadium.

== Medalists ==
Gold	Chang Ming-Huang; Chinese Taipei
Silver	Zhang Jun; China
Bronze	Om Prakash Karhana; India

== Records ==
World record	Randy Barnes (USA)	23.12	Westwood, United States	20 May 1990
Asian record	Sultan Abdulmajeed Al-Hebshi (KSA)	21.13	Doha, Qatar	8 May 2009
Championship record	Chang Ming-Huang (TPE)	20.14	Kobe, Japan	2011

== Results ==
=== Final ===
Rank	Athlete	Nationality	#1	#2	#3	#4	#5	#6	Result	Notes
1st place, gold medalist(s)	Chang Ming-Huang	Chinese Taipei	19.59	20.04	19.75	x	19.57	20.14	20.14	CR
2nd place, silver medalist(s)	Zhang Jun	China	18.62	19.77	19.44	19.71	x	x	19.77	
3rd place, bronze medalist(s)	Om Prakash Karhana	India	18.03	18.26	19.02	18.67	19.47	18.92	19.47	
4	Sourabh Vij	India	x	18.36	17.68	18.72	x	x	18.72	
5	Hwang In-Sung	South Korea	17.90	x	17.85	x	x	x	17.90	
6	Grigoriy Kamulya	Uzbekistan	x	16.78	17.37	17.43	17.46	17.10	17.46	
7	Musab Momani	Jordan	x	17.44	x	x	x	x	17.44	
8	Sotaro Yamada	Japan	17.33	x	17.12	x	x	x	17.33	
9	Yohei Murakawa	Japan	17.12	x	17.25				17.25	
