= 2015 Asian Athletics Championships – Men's shot put =

The Men's shot put at the 2015 Asian Athletics Championships was held on June 3.

== Results ==
Rank	Name	Nationality	#1	#2	#3	#4	#5	#6	Result	Notes
1st place, gold medalist(s)	Inderjeet Singh	India	x	18.95	20.00	20.33	20.41	20.19	20.41	CR
2nd place, silver medalist(s)	Chang Ming-huang	Chinese Taipei	19.56	x	19.44	19.32	19.05	19.11	19.56	
3rd place, bronze medalist(s)	Tian Zizhong	China	19.25	18.81	x	18.71	19.12	19.03	19.25	
4	Liu Yang	China	19.11	x	19.23	18.73	18.59	18.26	19.23	
5	Wang Guangfu	China	18.62	18.72	18.55	18.27	x	x	18.72	
6	Hayato Yamamoto	Japan	16.44	16.62	17.51	x	17.85	x	17.85	
7	Ivan Ivanov	Kazakhstan	17.66	x	17.47	17.50	17.78	x	17.78	
8	Sergey Dementev	Uzbekistan	x	17.47	x	x	x	x	17.47	
9	Saif Al-Kraiti	Iraq	16.36	16.24	x'				16.36	
10	Tejen Hommadov	Turkmenistan	x	14.28	x				14.28	
	Saeed Mubarak Al-Yami	Saudi Arabia	x	x	x				NM	
