= 2007 Asian Athletics Championships – Men's shot put =

The men's shot put event at the 2007 Asian Athletics Championships was held in Amman, Jordan on July 28.

== Results ==
Rank	Name	Nationality	Result	Notes
1st place, gold medalist(s)	Navpreet Singh	India	19.70	
2nd place, silver medalist(s)	Chang Ming-Huang	Chinese Taipei	19.66	
3rd place, bronze medalist(s)	Khalid Habash Al-Suwaidi	Qatar	19.51	
4	Seyed Mahdi Shahrokhi	Iran	18.80	
5	Ahmad Gholoum	Kuwait	18.17	
6	Sourabh Vij	India	17.49	
7	Mashari Mohammad	Kuwait	17.29	
8	Grigoriy Kamulya	Uzbekistan	16.84	
9	Musab Al-Momani	Jordan	15.88	
10	Mohamed Amine Kassem	Qatar	15.20	
11	Hou Fei	Macau	13.16	
12	Ma Kam Cheong	Macau	11.84	
