= Athletics at the 2010 Asian Games – Men's shot put =

Men's shot put at the 2010 Asian Games
- Venue: Aoti Main Stadium
- Date: 26 November 2010
- Competitors: 11 from 9 nations

Medalists
gold medal	Sultan Al-Hebshi	Saudi Arabia
silver medal	Zhang Jun	China
bronze medal	Chang Ming-huang	Chinese Taipei

The men's shot put event at the 2010 Asian Games was held at the Aoti Main Stadium, Guangzhou, China on 26 November 2010.

== Schedule ==
All times are China Standard Time (UTC+08:00)

Date	Time	Event
Friday, 26 November 2010	18:40	Final

== Records ==
Prior to this competition, the existing world, Asian and Games records were as follows.

World Record	Randy Barnes (USA)	23.12	Los Angeles, United States	20 May 1990
Asian Record	Sultan Al-Hebshi (KSA)	21.13	Doha, Qatar	8 May 2009
Games Record	Sultan Al-Hebshi (KSA)	20.42	Doha, Qatar	11 December 2006

== Results ==
Rank	Athlete	Attempt						Result	Notes
Rank	Athlete	1	2	3	4	5	6	Result	Notes
1st place, gold medalist(s)	Sultan Al-Hebshi (KSA)	18.17	19.52	18.69	19.21	19.80	20.57	20.57	GR
2nd place, silver medalist(s)	Zhang Jun (CHN)	18.89	X	19.59	X	19.29	19.42	19.59	
3rd place, bronze medalist(s)	Chang Ming-huang (TPE)	19.15	19.48	19.38	19.15	19.31	19.31	19.48	
4	Om Prakash Karhana (IND)	15.88	18.36	18.77	19.17	X	X	19.17	
5	Amin Nikfar (IRI)	X	18.85	19.08	X	X	X	19.08	
6	Sourabh Vij (IND)	16.83	X	18.13	18.98	X	X	18.98	
7	Khalid Habash Al-Suwaidi (QAT)	17.13	18.02	X	X	X	X	18.02	
8	Hwang In-sung (KOR)	17.35	17.50	17.87	17.71	X	17.44	17.87	
9	Jung Il-woo (KOR)	16.74	16.94	16.85				16.94	
10	Chatchawal Polyiam (THA)	16.05	16.59	X				16.59	
11	Abdelraouf Al-Ghalayini (PLE)	12.02	12.50	11.85				12.50	
