= 2017 Asian Athletics Championships – Men's shot put =

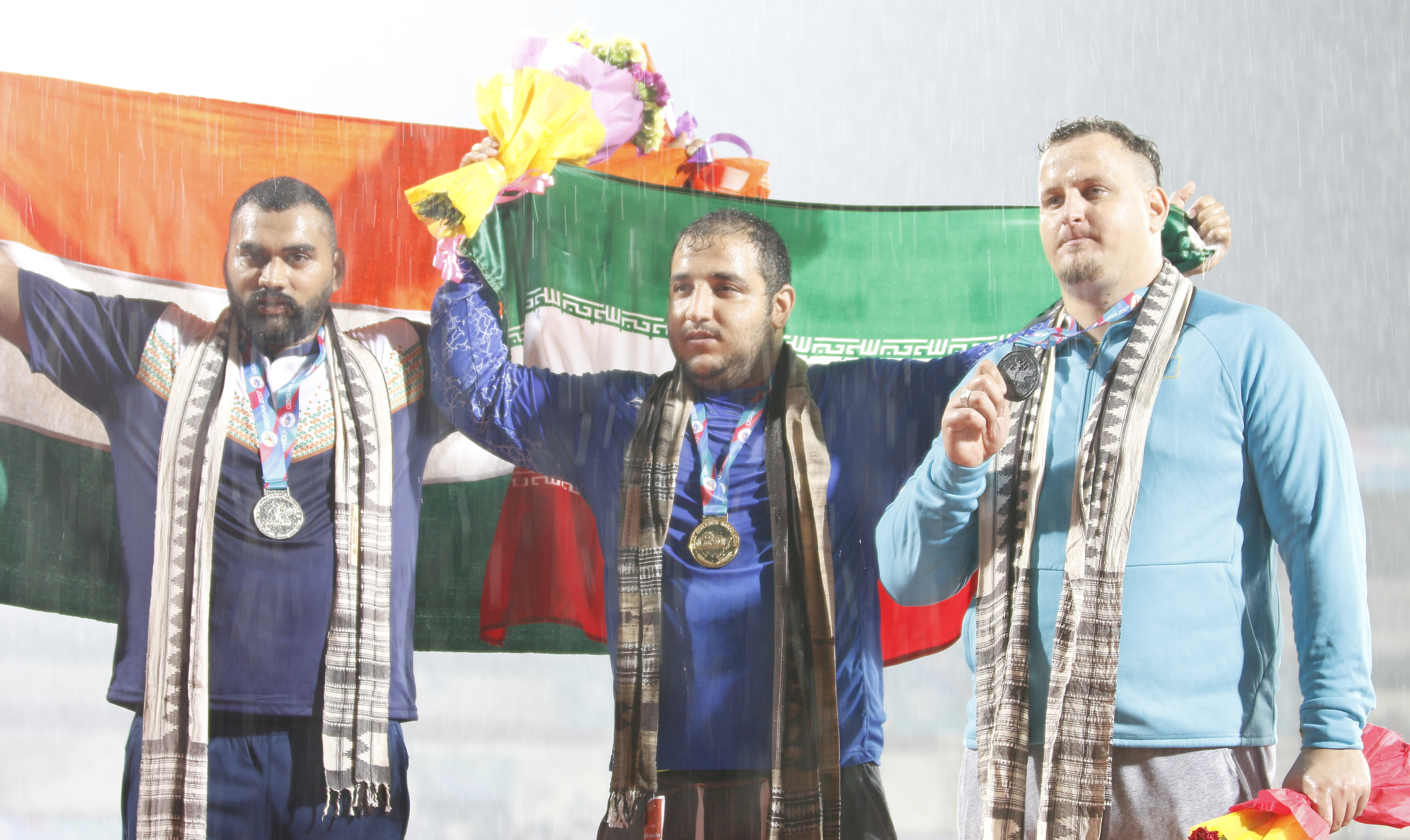
Left-right: Singh, Samari, Ivanov

The men's shot put at the 2017 Asian Athletics Championships was held on 7 July.

== Results ==
Rank	Name	Nationality	#1	#2	#3	#4	#5	#6	Result	Notes
1st place, gold medalist(s)	Ali Samari	Iran	x	19.80	x	x	x	?	19.80	
2nd place, silver medalist(s)	Tejinder Pal Singh	India	18.49	19.58	19.77	19.11	x	19.61	19.77	
3rd place, bronze medalist(s)	Ivan Ivanov	Kazakhstan	19.41	18.02	x	x	18.48	18.95	19.41	
4	Om Prakash Singh Karhana	India	17.69	x	17.92	x	18.31	18.70	18.70	
5	Daichi Nakamura	Japan	18.46	x	x	16.13	x	17.34	18.46	
6	Han Zibin	China	18.07	x	18.29	17.65	18.01	17.78	18.29	
7	Li Jun	China	18.16	18.06	x	x	x	x	18.16	
8	Jasdeep Singh Dhillon	India	18.07	x	17.91	17.78	17.38	x	18.07	
9	Sultan Al-Hebshi	Saudi Arabia	17.18	15.89	17.62				17.62	
10	Satoshi Hatase	Japan	17.36	x	17.18				17.36	
11	Sergey Dementyev	Uzbekistan	17.06	x	x				17.06	
12	Ameen Atiyyah	Saudi Arabia	x	15.68	16.86				16.86	
	S. Mohammad	Kuwait	x	x	x				NM	
