= Sourabh Vij =

Indian shot putter

Sourabh Vij (born 14 June 1987) is an Indian shot putter. He won gold at the second Commonwealth Youth Games. In 2006 he won an Asian Junior silver medal and represented India at the 2006 World Junior Championships in Athletics.

After appearances at the Asian Indoor Games, he came to prominence in 2010 with an unratified national record-beating throw of 20.65 metres. Second place at the national championships guaranteed him a spot at the 2010 Commonwealth Games in his hometown of New Delhi. His test from the championships came back positive for the banned substance methylhexaneamine, however, and he was banned from competition, missing the Games.

== Career ==
Born in New Delhi, Vij won his first medal at the 2004 Commonwealth Youth Games, where his mark of 18.45 metres brought him the shot put gold medal (India's second athletics gold of the competition along with Hari Shankar Roy). He began competing as a junior with a 6 kg implement in 2005. His first successes came the following year: he won the national junior championships, took a silver medal at the 2006 Asian Junior Athletics Championships and represented India at the 2006 World Junior Championships in Athletics in Beijing, where he finished seventh in the shot put final. He moved up into the senior ranks the following year and finished ninth at the 2007 Asian Indoor Games. He returned to the competition two years later and his throw of 18.38 m at the 2009 Asian Indoor Games brought him a fifth-place finish.

He earned himself a place in the main national team in the buildup to the 2010 Commonwealth Games in his hometown of Delhi. Having consistently thrown over 20 metres that season, he surpassed Shakti Singh's decade-old Indian record of 20.42 m by some distance with a put of 20.65 m to win at the Delhi State Annual Athletics Championships. However, the mark could not be ratified as the meeting did not conduct any of the necessary doping tests or have an official from the Athletics Federation of India present. The following week he competed at the Asian All-Star Meet – a test event for the forthcoming Commonwealth Games athletics competition. He had a best mark of 19.09 m and finished runner-up behind Om Prakash Singh. At the Indian Inter-State Championships in August he was again runner-up to Singh, but threw a more-impressive 19.91 m – eight centimetres off the winning mark. His plans to represent his nation at the Commonwealth Games in his hometown finished abruptly as his doping test at the championships came back positive for the banned substance methylhexaneamine (a stimulant). The failed test was one of seven positive results for the drug, coming at the same time as those for discus thrower Akash Antil and six wrestlers, including Rajiv Tomar.

== Competition record ==
Year	Competition	Venue	Position	Event	Notes
Representing India
2004	Commonwealth Youth Games	Bendigo, Australia	1st	Shot put (6 kg)	18.45 m
2006	Asian Junior Championships	Macau	2nd	Shot put (6 kg)	19.62 m
2006	World Junior Championships	Beijing, China	7th	Shot put (6 kg)	19.75 m
2007	Universiade	Bangkok, Thailand	12th	Shot put	17.96 m
2007	Asian Indoor Games	Macau	9th	Shot put	16.75 m
2009	Asian Indoor Games	Hanoi, Vietnam	5th	Shot put	18.38 m
2009	Asian Championships	Guangzhou, China	9th	Shot put	18.09 m
2010	Asian Indoor Championships	Tehran, Iran	5th	Shot put	17.22 m
2010	Commonwealth Games	Delhi, India	6th	Shot put	18.60 m
2010	Asian Games	Guangzhou, China	6th	Shot put	18.98 m
2011	Asian Championships	Kobe, Japan	4th	Shot put	18.72 m

== See also ==
- List of doping cases in athletics
