= 2000 Asian Athletics Championships – Men's shot put =

The men's shot put event at the 2000 Asian Athletics Championships was held in Jakarta, Indonesia on 28 August.

== Results ==
Rank	Name	Nationality	#1	#2	#3	#4	#5	#6	Result	Notes
1st place, gold medalist(s)	Shakti Singh	India	19.77	x	18.54	x	x	19.33	19.77	CR
2nd place, silver medalist(s)	Bilal Saad Mubarak	Qatar	19.23	x	x	x	x	17.83	19.23	
3rd place, bronze medalist(s)	Wen Jili	China	18.18	18.10	x	x	–	–	18.18	
4	Yasutada Noguchi	Japan							18.16	
5	Ahmad Hassan Gholoum	Kuwait							17.81	
6	Ali Rahmani	Iran							17.37	
7	Ghufran Hussain	Pakistan							17.23	
8	Kim Jae-Il	South Korea							16.89	
9	Sergey Rubtsov	Kazakhstan							16.36	
10	Wansawang Sawasdee	Thailand							16.32	
11	Khalid Habash Al-Suwaidi	Qatar							15.67	
12	Sarayudh Pinitjit	Thailand							15.67	
13	Dao Dan Tieng	Vietnam							14.26	
14	Saber Salem Saeed Baiha	United Arab Emirates							14.23	
15	Omar Jouma Khamis	United Arab Emirates							14.21	
	Bahadur Singh Sagoo	India	x	x	x				NM	
