= 2009 Asian Athletics Championships – Men's shot put =

Athletics competition

men's shot put event at the 2009 Asian Athletics Championships
- Dates: 11 November 2009; 16 years ago
- Main venue: Guangdong Olympic Stadium

The men's shot put event at the 2009 Asian Athletics Championships was held at the Guangdong Olympic Stadium on November 11.

== Results ==
Rank	Athlete	Nationality	#1	#2	#3	#4	#5	#6	Result	Notes
1st place, gold medalist(s)	Om Prakash Karhana	India	19.01	x	x	19.00	19.87	x	19.87	CR
2nd place, silver medalist(s)	Chang Ming-huang	Chinese Taipei	18.82	19.34	12.84	18.32	x	18.98	19.34	
3rd place, bronze medalist(s)	Zhang Jun	China	18.94	18.39	19.15	x	18.99	x	19.15	
4	Guo Yanxiang	China	18.11	17.66	18.09	18.54	19.07	18.93	19.07	
5	Sultan Al-Hebshi	Saudi Arabia	x	17.54	18.89	18.56	17.62	x	18.89	
6	Grigoriy Kamulya	Uzbekistan	18.70	17.92	x	18.17	18.18	18.55	18.70	PB
7	Mashari Mohammad	Kuwait	18.51	18.24	x	18.50	18.16	x	18.51	
8	Amin Nikfar	Iran	18.30	18.28	x	x	x	x	18.30	
9	Saurabh Vij	India	x	18.09	x				18.09	
10	Hwang In-sung	South Korea	17.88	x	17.31				17.88	
11	Sotaro Yamada	Japan	17.57	16.99	17.14				17.57	
12	Sergey Dementev	Uzbekistan	16.54	x	16.02				16.54	
13	Chatchawal Polyiam	Thailand	x	x	16.39				16.39	
14	Hou Fei	Macau	13.85	x	13.66				13.85	
15	Mohammad Yazid Yatimi Yusof	Brunei	x	12.82	12.96				12.96	
