= 2016 Asian Indoor Athletics Championships – Results =

These are the full results of the 2016 Asian Indoor Athletics Championships which took place between 19 and 21 February 2016 in Doha, Qatar.

== Men's results ==
=== 60 meters ===
Heats – 19 February

Rank	Heat	Name	Nationality	Time	Notes
1	2	Tosin Ogunode	Qatar	6.67	Q
2	2	Reza Ghasemi	Iran	6.71	Q
3	3	Barakat Al-Harthi	Oman	6.73	Q, SB
4	3	Samuel Francis	Qatar	6.73	Q
5	4	Jirapong Meenapra	Thailand	6.74	Q, PB
6	4	Eric Cray	Philippines	6.74	Q
7	3	Mohd Fadlin	Indonesia	6.75	Q, PB
8	4	Calvin Kang Li Loong	Singapore	6.77	Q, SB
9	1	Vitaliy Zems	Kazakhstan	6.81	Q, =PB
9	1	Hassan Taftian	Iran	6.81	Q, SB
9	2	Hassan Saaid	Maldives	6.81	Q, NR
12	1	Mohammed Abukhousa	Palestine	6.87	Q, NR
13	1	Mohammad Yaseen Al-Hasan	Saudi Arabia	6.87	q, SB
14	2	Muhammad Rozikin	Indonesia	6.88	q, PB
15	3	Harith Ammar Mohd Sobri	Malaysia	6.89	q, PB
16	4	Khalid Al-Ghilani	Oman	6.90	q, PB
17	4	Eid Abdulla Al-Kuwari	Qatar	6.91	
18	4	Nabrad Mohamed Taleb	Iraq	6.92	PB
19	4	Tang Yik Chun	Hong Kong	6.93	SB
20	3	Battulgyn Achitbileg	Mongolia	6.95	PB
21	2	Ramzi Naim	Lebanon	7.01	
22	3	Noureddine Hadid	Lebanon	7.04	PB
23	1	Yang Zi Xian	Macau	7.06	PB
24	3	Davron Atabaev	Tajikistan	7.09	PB
24	4	Akmyrat Orazgeldiyev	Turkmenistan	7.09	
26	2	Omar Juma Al-Salfa	United Arab Emirates	7.11	SB
27	1	Lai Chun Ho	Hong Kong	7.14	SB
28	3	Dastan Jamal Al-Mulla	Iraq	7.17	PB
29	1	Sareesh Ahmed	Maldives	7.63	PB
	2	Meshaal Al-Mutairi	Kuwait	DNS	

Semifinals – 19 February

Rank	Heat	Name	Nationality	Time	Notes
1	1	Eric Cray	Philippines	6.57	Q, CR, =NR
2	2	Hassan Taftian	Iran	6.66	Q, SB
3	2	Barakat Al-Harthi	Oman	6.67	Q
4	1	Reza Ghasemi	Iran	6.69	Q, SB
5	1	Mohd Fadlin	Indonesia	6.74	Q, PB
6	2	Hassan Saaid	Maldives	6.75	Q, NR
7	1	Mohammed Abukhousa	Palestine	6.77	Q, NR
7	2	Jirapong Meenapra	Thailand	6.77	Q
9	2	Calvin Kang Li Loong	Singapore	6.82	
10	1	Mohammad Yaseen Al-Hasan	Saudi Arabia	6.84	SB
11	2	Muhammad Rozikin	Indonesia	6.87	PB
12	1	Khalid Al-Ghilani	Oman	6.89	PB
13	2	Harith Ammar Mohd Sobri	Malaysia	6.94	
	1	Vitaliy Zems	Kazakhstan	DQ	R162.6
	1	Tosin Ogunode	Qatar	DQ	R162.6
	2	Samuel Francis	Qatar	DQ	R162.6

Final – 19 February

Rank	Lane	Name	Nationality	Time	Notes
1st place, gold medalist(s)	3	Hassan Taftian	Iran	6.56	CR, NR
2nd place, silver medalist(s)	6	Reza Ghasemi	Iran	6.66	SB
3rd place, bronze medalist(s)	4	Eric Cray	Philippines	6.70	
4	7	Mohd Fadlin	Indonesia	6.75	
5	8	Hassan Saaid	Maldives	6.84	
6	2	Jirapong Meenapra	Thailand	6.84	
7	1	Mohammed Abukhousa	Palestine	6.89	
	5	Barakat Al-Harthi	Oman	DNS	

=== 400 meters ===
Heats – 19 February

Rank	Heat	Name	Nationality	Time	Notes
1	5	Mikhail Litvin	Kazakhstan	47.28	Q
2	1	Abbas Abubaker	Bahrain	47.34	Q, NR
3	5	Mohammad Nasser Abbas	Qatar	47.81	Q
4	4	Yousef Karam	Kuwait	47.93	Q, NR
5	4	Quach Cong Luc	Vietnam	48.09	Q
6	4	Mehdi Zamani	Iran	48.20	q, SB
7	4	Gamal Abdelnasir Abubaker	Qatar	48.24	q, PB
8	1	Mohamed Abdul Ridha	Iraq	48.36	Q, NR
9	1	Joan Caido	Philippines	48.50	PB
10	3	Abdelalelah Haroun	Qatar	48.58	Q
11	4	Asad Iqbal	Pakistan	48.71	NR
12	1	Aleksandr Pronzhenko	Tajikistan	48.87	NR
13	2	Guo Zhongze	China	49.07	Q, PB
14	2	Chan Ka Chun	Hong Kong	49.24	Q, SB
15	1	Abdullah Abkar Al-Moualed	Saudi Arabia	49.25	PB
16	2	Nokar Hussain	Pakistan	49.38	
17	3	Saud Abdelkarim Mohamed	United Arab Emirates	49.98	Q, SB
18	3	Archand Christian Bagsit	Philippines	50.20	PB
19	5	Aleksey Namuratov	Kyrgyzstan	50.22	
20	5	Saeed Hashwan	Yemen	51.64	PB
21	2	Said Hadid	Afghanistan	51.82	NR
22	3	Naseem Munassar	Yemen	51.90	PB
23	3	Samir Badaro	Jordan	55.94	PB
	3	Ao Ieong Ka Hou	Macau	DQ	R163.3a
	5	Sajjad Hashemi	Iran	DQ	R163.3a
	2	Noureddine Hadid	Lebanon	DNS	
	4	Obaid Hindi Mohamed	Oman	DNS	
	5	Ahmed Mubarak Salah	Oman	DNS	

Semifinals – 19 February

Rank	Heat	Name	Nationality	Time	Notes
1	1	Abdelalelah Haroun	Qatar	46.38	Q, SB
2	2	Abbas Abubaker	Bahrain	46.84	Q, NR
3	2	Mohammad Nasser Abbas	Qatar	47.14	Q, PB
4	1	Mikhail Litvin	Kazakhstan	47.25	Q
5	2	Quach Cong Luc	Vietnam	47.87	Q
6	2	Yousef Karam	Kuwait	47.88	NR
7	2	Mehdi Zamani	Iran	47.92	SB
8	1	Guo Zhongze	China	47.96	Q, PB
9	1	Gamal Abdelnasir Abubaker	Qatar	48.65	
10	1	Mohamed Abdul Ridha	Iraq	48.71	
11	1	Chan Ka Chun	Hong Kong	48.89	
12	2	Saud Abdelkarim Mohamed	United Arab Emirates	50.39	

Final – 20 February

Rank	Lane	Name	Nationality	Time	Notes
1st place, gold medalist(s)	5	Abdelalelah Haroun	Qatar	45.88	CR, SB
2nd place, silver medalist(s)	6	Abbas Abubaker	Bahrain	46.60	NR
3rd place, bronze medalist(s)	4	Mikhail Litvin	Kazakhstan	46.80	NR
4	3	Mohammad Nasser Abbas	Qatar	47.35	
5	2	Guo Zhongze	China	47.95	PB
6	1	Quach Cong Luc	Vietnam	48.29	

=== 800 meters ===
Heats – 19 February

Rank	Heat	Name	Nationality	Time	Notes
1	2	Jamal Hairane	Qatar	1:53.95	Q
2	2	Mostafa Ebrahimi	Iran	1:54.32	Q
3	2	Jonathan Kipkosgei	Bahrain	1:54.33	q, PB
4	2	Farkhod Kuralov	Tajikistan	1:54.79	q, SB
5	1	Abubaker Haydar Abdalla	Qatar	1:56.13	Q, PB
6	1	Musaeb Abdulrahman Balla	Qatar	1:56.91	Q
7	2	Fang Jianyong	Singapore	1:57.16	PB
8	1	Indunil Herath	Sri Lanka	1:57.26	PB
9	1	Muhammad Ikram	Pakistan	1:57.59	PB

Final – 21 February

Rank	Name	Nationality	Time	Notes
1st place, gold medalist(s)	Musaeb Abdulrahman Balla	Qatar	1:46.92	CR
2nd place, silver medalist(s)	Jamal Hairane	Qatar	1:48.05	PB
3rd place, bronze medalist(s)	Mostafa Ebrahimi	Iran	1:48.26	NR
4	Abubaker Haydar Abdalla	Qatar	1:48.30	PB
5	Farkhod Kuralov	Tajikistan	1:54.07	SB
	Jonathan Kipkosgei	Bahrain	DNF	

=== 1500 meters ===
20 February

Rank	Name	Nationality	Time	Notes
1st place, gold medalist(s)	Mohamed Al-Garni	Qatar	3:36.35	CR, NR
2nd place, silver medalist(s)	Benson Seurei	Bahrain	3:37.08	PB
3rd place, bronze medalist(s)	Said Aden Said	Qatar	3:37.29	PB
4	Musaab Adam Ali	Qatar	3:37.30	PB
5	Ajay Kumar Saroj	India	3:47.26	PB
6	Rahul Harveer Singh	India	3:48.80	PB
7	Hossein Keyhani	Iran	3:49.53	PB
8	Mohammed Shaween	Saudi Arabia	3:54.25	PB
9	Tariq Ahmed Al-Amri	Saudi Arabia	4:01.71	PB
10	Ebrahim Shabil	Yemen	4:02.17	PB
11	Fang Jianyong	Singapore	4:09.50	NR
	Marouane Habti	Bahrain	DNF	
	Adnan Taess	Iraq	DNF	
	Wesam Al-Massri	Palestine	DNS	

=== 3000 meters ===
21 February

Rank	Name	Nationality	Time	Notes
1st place, gold medalist(s)	Mohamed Al-Garni	Qatar	7:39.23	CR, NR
2nd place, silver medalist(s)	Albert Rop	Bahrain	7:40.27	SB
3rd place, bronze medalist(s)	Said Aden Said	Qatar	7:44.69	PB
4	Naveen Kumar	India	8:03.21	PB
5	Hashim Salah Abbas	Qatar	8:03.27	PB
6	Linus Kiplagat	Bahrain	8:12.35	PB
7	Hossein Keyhani	Iran	8:14.99	PB
8	Adilet Kyshtabekov	Kyrgyzstan	8:29.45	PB
9	Noor Aldeen Al-Humaidha	Yemen	8:54.71	PB
10	Mohanad Ali	Palestine	8:58.11	PB

=== 60 meters hurdles ===
Heats – 20 February

Rank	Heat	Name	Nationality	Time	Notes
1	1	Abdulaziz Al-Mandeel	Kuwait	7.66	Q, NR
2	2	Jiang Fan	China	7.76	Q, SB
3	1	Zhang Honglin	China	7.80	Q
4	2	Yaqoub Al-Youha	Kuwait	7.82	Q, PB
5	1	Chen Kuei-Ju	Chinese Taipei	7.89	Q, PB
6	1	Ameer Shakir Aneed	Iraq	7.90	q
7	2	Yang Wei-Ting	Chinese Taipei	8.00	Q, PB
8	2	Milad Sayyar	Iran	8.03	q, SB
9	2	Rayzam Shah Wan Sofian	Malaysia	8.04	SB
10	1	Chen Xiang Ang	Singapore	8.16	PB
11	1	Mohd Ajmal Mat Hassan	Malaysia	8.17	PB
12	1	Costa Lai Ho Tat	Macau	8.29	PB
13	2	Ali Hazer	Lebanon	8.64	SB

Final – 21 February

Rank	Lane	Name	Nationality	Time	Notes
1st place, gold medalist(s)	5	Abdulaziz Al-Mandeel	Kuwait	7.60	NR
2nd place, silver medalist(s)	3	Yaqoub Al-Youha	Kuwait	7.65	PB
3rd place, bronze medalist(s)	6	Zhang Honglin	China	7.73	
4	8	Chen Kuei-Ju	Chinese Taipei	7.81	PB
5	7	Yang Wei-Ting	Chinese Taipei	7.87	PB
6	1	Milad Sayyar	Iran	8.01	SB
	2	Ameer Shakir Aneed	Iraq	DNF	
	4	Jiang Fan	China	DQ	

=== 4 x 400 meters relay ===
21 February

Rank	Nation	Athletes	Time	Notes
1st place, gold medalist(s)	Qatar	Mohammad Nasser Abbas, Musaeb Abdulrahman Balla, Abubaker Haydar Abdalla, Abdelalelah Haroun	3:08.20	CR, NR
2nd place, silver medalist(s)	Iran	Reza Ghasemi, Mostafa Ebrahimi, Mehdi Zamani, Sajjad Hashemi	3:11.86	NR

=== High jump ===
19 February

Rank	Name	Nationality	2.00	2.05	2.10	2.15	2.20	2.24	2.28	2.31	2.35	2.40	Results	Notes
1st place, gold medalist(s)	Mutaz Essa Barshim	Qatar	–	–	–	–	–	o	o	xo	xo	xxx	2.35	
2nd place, silver medalist(s)	Majededdin Ghazal	Syria	–	–	o	o	o	xo	xo	xxx			2.28	NR
3rd place, bronze medalist(s)	Manjula Kumara	Sri Lanka	–	o	o	xxo	o	xo	xxx				2.24	NR
4	Sun Zhao	China	–	o	o	o	o	xxx					2.20	SB
4	Mohammadreza Vazifehdoost	Iran	–	o	o	o	o	xxx					2.20	
4	Keivan Ghanbarzadeh	Iran	–	–	o	o	o	xxx					2.20	
7	Yun Seung-hyun	South Korea	–	–	o	o	xo	xxx					2.20	
8	Yuriy Dergachev	Kazakhstan	–	o	o	o	xxx						2.15	
9	Hamdi Al-Amine Saleh	Qatar	o	o	o	xxx							2.10	
10	Nawaf Ahmed Al-Yami	Saudi Arabia	–	–	xo	xxx							2.10	PB
11	Muamer Aissa Barsham	Qatar	o	xo	xo	xxx							2.10	=SB
12	Woo Sang-hyeok	South Korea	–	o	xxo	xxx							2.10	=SB
13	Ali Faisal Gholoum	United Arab Emirates	o	xo	xxx								2.05	PB
14	Muhammed Ashraf Rahman	Malaysia	o	xxo	xxx								2.05	PB
	Tejaswin Shankar	India	xxx										NM	
	Hussein Al-Ibraheemi	Iraq	xxx										NM	
	Wang Yu	China											DNS	

=== Pole vault ===
20 February

Rank	Name	Nationality	4.75	5.00	5.10	5.20	5.30	5.40	5.50	5.60	5.70	5.75	5.82	Results	Notes
1st place, gold medalist(s)	Huang Bokai	China	–	–	–	–	xo	–	xxo	o	xo	o	xxx	5.75	CR, =PB
2nd place, silver medalist(s)	Seito Yamamoto	Japan	–	–	–	–	–	xxo	–	xo	xxx			5.60	
3rd place, bronze medalist(s)	Hiroki Ogita	Japan	–	–	–	–	o	–	xo	–	xxx			5.50	
4	Ernest Obiena	Philippines	–	o	–	o	–	xo	xxx					5.40	PB
5	Muntadher Abdulwahid	Iraq	–	–	o	o	xxo	xxx						5.30	NR
6	Mohd Iskandar Alwi	Malaysia	xxo	o	xxx									5.00	SB
7	Ali Makki Al-Sabagha	Kuwait	xo	xxx										4.75	SB
	Xia Xiang	China	–	–	–	–	xxx							NM	

=== Long jump ===
21 February

Rank	Name	Nationality	#1	#2	#3	#4	#5	#6	Results	Notes
1st place, gold medalist(s)	Zhang Yaoguang	China	7.83	7.81	7.99	x	7.83	7.93	7.99	PB
2nd place, silver medalist(s)	Kumaravel Premkumar	India	7.54	7.70	7.63	x	x	7.92	7.92	NR
3rd place, bronze medalist(s)	Chan Ming Tai	Hong Kong	7.79	x	x	7.76	x	7.85	7.85	NR
4	Kota Minemura	Japan	7.41	7.60	7.79	7.78	x	7.82	7.82	PB
5	Huang Changzhou	China	7.81	7.65	x	7.73	7.81	7.64	7.81	SB
6	Ankit Sharma	India	x	7.66	x	x	x	7.58	7.66	PB
7	Saleh Al-Haddad	Kuwait	7.60	7.59	7.47	x	x	–	7.60	SB
8	Mohammed Al-Khuwalidi	Saudi Arabia	x	7.32	x	5.36	7.52	x	7.52	SB
9	Milad Darisavi	Iran	5.31	x	7.09				7.09	
10	Donovant Arriola	Philippines	6.94	6.86	7.02				7.02	
11	Ivan Denisov	Uzbekistan	7.00	6.97	x				7.00	
12	Janry Ubas	Philippines	6.61	6.84	7.00				7.00	PB

=== Triple jump ===
20 February

Rank	Name	Nationality	#1	#2	#3	#4	#5	#6	Results	Notes
1st place, gold medalist(s)	Roman Valiyev	Kazakhstan	16.30	x	16.63	x	16.69	x	16.69	
2nd place, silver medalist(s)	Renjith Maheshwary	India	14.98	15.59	15.28	15.91	16.16	15.79	16.16	PB
3rd place, bronze medalist(s)	Rashid Al-Mannai	Qatar	15.84	15.73	x	x	x	15.97	15.97	NR
4	Yevgeniy Ektov	Kazakhstan	15.81	x	15.90	15.70	x	15.91	15.91	
5	Milad Darisavi	Iran	15.62	15.74	15.89	x	15.49	x	15.89	
6	Cao Shuo	China	15.76	15.47	15.48	x	x	x	15.76	
7	Muhd Hakimi Ismail	Malaysia	14.86	15.40	15.41	15.47	15.75	15.72	15.75	SB
8	Ivan Denisov	Uzbekistan	14.95	14.76	15.19	x	15.18	15.32	15.32	SB
9	Nik Fariezal Erman Ab Hadi	Malaysia	x	14.88	x				14.88	PB
10	Hassan Nasser Dawshi	Saudi Arabia	14.67	14.85	x				14.85	
11	Jayakumar Surendhar	India	14.76	14.51	–				14.76	

=== Shot put ===
21 February

Rank	Name	Nationality	#1	#2	#3	#4	#5	#6	Results	Notes
1st place, gold medalist(s)	Liu Yang	China	17.73	18.83	x	18.99	18.82	19.30	19.30	SB
2nd place, silver medalist(s)	Tian Zhizhong	China	18.11	18.84	18.85	18.66	18.78	18.88	18.88	
3rd place, bronze medalist(s)	Om Prakash Karhana	India	x	17.98	x	x	18.77	x	18.77	SB
4	Ali Samari	Iran	x	17.60	x	x	17.82	x	17.82	
5	Sergey Dementyev	Uzbekistan	x	x	x	x	x	17.73	17.73	
6	Jung Il-woo	South Korea	16.96	x	17.45	x	x	x	17.45	
7	Mohammadhossein Eskandari	Iran	x	x	x	15.94	x	x	15.94	
8	Tejen Hommadov	Turkmenistan	x	14.52	x	14.72	x	15.26	15.26	

=== Heptathlon ===
20–21 February

The highest mark recorded in each event is highlighted in yellow

Rank	Athlete	Nationality	60m	LJ	SP	HJ	60m H	PV	1000m	Points	Notes
1st place, gold medalist(s)	Akihiko Nakamura	Japan	7.03	7.13	11.60	1.94	8.13	4.90	2:32.88	5831	NR
2nd place, silver medalist(s)	Hu Yufei	China	7.06	7.18	14.06	1.97	8.02	4.40	2:45.71	5745	PB
3rd place, bronze medalist(s)	Marat Khaydarov	Uzbekistan	7.20	6.84	12.99	2.00	8.14	4.70	2:47.33	5619	PB
4	Leonid Andreyev	Uzbekistan	7.20	7.02	14.83	1.82	8.39	5.10	2:53.84	5607	PB
5	Mohammed Al-Qaree	Saudi Arabia	6.95	7.18	13.32	1.94	8.08	4.30	2:54.21	5579	SB
6	Takumi Otobe	Japan	6.95	6.84	13.09	1.91	8.35	4.40	2:48.18	5484	PB
7	Mohammed Al-Mannai	Qatar	7.37	7.14	13.40	1.88	8.37	4.50	2:51.54	5391	NR
8	Abdoljalil Toumaj	Iran	7.10	6.91	13.13	1.91	8.43	4.30	DNF	4616	
9	Magid Al-Zeed	Kuwait	7.25	6.78	11.10	1.82	8.38	NM	2:37.86	4539	PB

== Women's results ==
=== 60 meters ===
Heats – 19 February

Rank	Heat	Name	Nationality	Time	Notes
1	3	Dutee Chand	India	7.28	Q, CR, NR
2	1	Viktoriya Zyabkina	Kazakhstan	7.35	Q
3	2	Yuan Qiqi	China	7.38	Q, SB
4	1	Lam On Ki	Hong Kong	7.45	Q, NR
5	3	Hajar Al-Khaldi	Bahrain	7.48	Q, PB
6	4	Basirah Sharifa Nasir	Bahrain	7.49	Q, PB
7	3	Rima Kashafutdinova	Kazakhstan	7.50	Q
8	1	Lusiana Satriani	Indonesia	7.52	Q, PB
9	4	Farzaneh Fasihi	Iran	7.53	Q
10	4	Lin Huijun	China	7.56	Q, SB
11	3	Dana Hussain	Iraq	7.60	q, PB
12	2	Zaidatul Husniah Zulkifli	Malaysia	7.61	Q, PB
13	2	Diana Agliulina	Uzbekistan	7.62	Q
14	4	Alaa Hikmat	Iraq	7.63	q, PB
15	3	Valentina Meredova	Turkmenistan	7.64	q, NR
16	2	Tri Setyo Utami	Indonesia	7.65	q, PB
17	4	Aziza Sbaity	Lebanon	7.67	NR
18	3	Mazoon Al-Alawi	Oman	7.83	NR, NJR
19	3	Maha Al-Moallem	Lebanon	7.91	PB
20	1	Mudhawi Al-Shammari	Kuwait	7.94	PB
21	4	Farah Rasem Yacoub Hashem	Jordan	8.01	PB
22	2	Yekaterina Yazmuradova	Turkmenistan	8.04	PB
23	4	Bashair Obaid Al-Manwari	Qatar	8.11	NR
24	2	Nadiah Al-Haqoan	Kuwait	8.18	PB
25	2	Aliya Khattab Boshnak	Jordan	8.27	PB
26	1	Aishath Zara Athif	Maldives	8.63	PB
	1	Srabani Nanda	India	DQ	

Semifinals – 19 February

Rank	Heat	Name	Nationality	Time	Notes
1	2	Viktoriya Zyabkina	Kazakhstan	7.33	Q
2	1	Dutee Chand	India	7.39	Q
3	1	Rima Kashafutdinova	Kazakhstan	7.41	Q, =PB
3	2	Yuan Qiqi	China	7.41	Q
5	2	Farzaneh Fasihi	Iran	7.45	Q
6	1	Basirah Sharifa Nasir	Bahrain	7.46	Q, PB
7	2	Hajar Al-Khaldi	Bahrain	7.49	Q
8	2	Lusiana Satriani	Indonesia	7.54	
9	1	Lam On Ki	Hong Kong	7.55	Q
10	1	Dana Hussain	Iraq	7.62	
11	1	Zaidatul Husniah Zulkifli	Malaysia	7.66	
12	2	Lin Huijun	China	7.67	
13	1	Diana Agliulina	Uzbekistan	7.70	
13	2	Alaa Hikmat	Iraq	7.70	
15	1	Tri Setyo Utami	Indonesia	7.71	
16	2	Valentina Meredova	Turkmenistan	7.74	

Final – 19 February

Rank	Heat	Name	Nationality	Time	Notes
1st place, gold medalist(s)	4	Viktoriya Zyabkina	Kazakhstan	7.27	CR
2nd place, silver medalist(s)	5	Yuan Qiqi	China	7.33	SB
3rd place, bronze medalist(s)	3	Dutee Chand	India	7.37	
4	8	Basirah Sharifa Nasir	Bahrain	7.37	NR
5	7	Farzaneh Fasihi	Iran	7.45	
6	1	Hajar Al-Khaldi	Bahrain	7.46	PB
7	6	Rima Kashafutdinova	Kazakhstan	7.50	
8	2	Lam On Ki	Hong Kong	7.52	

=== 400 meters ===
Heats – 19 February

Rank	Heat	Name	Nationality	Time	Notes
1	1	Kemi Adekoya	Bahrain	51.68	Q, AR, CR
2	2	Elina Mikhina	Kazakhstan	53.78	Q
3	2	Quach Thi Lan	Vietnam	55.02	Q
4	2	Iman Isa Jassim	Bahrain	55.37	q, PB
5	1	Alaa Hikmat	Iraq	55.42	Q, PB
6	2	Ghofrane Mohammad	Syria	55.45	q, PB
7	2	Ng Weng Ian	Macau	59.71	PB
8	1	Hanaa Al-Qassimi	Oman	1:02.43	PB
9	1	Noor Wael Al-Qadi	Jordan	1:03.62	PB
	1	Maryam Toosi	Iran	DQ	R163.3(a)
	1	Hanin Wakil Ghaleb	Yemen	DNS	
	2	Laila Sharif Mohammed	Yemen	DNS	

Final – 20 February

Rank	Lane	Name	Nationality	Time	Notes
1st place, gold medalist(s)	5	Kemi Adekoya	Bahrain	51.67	AR, CR
2nd place, silver medalist(s)	6	Elina Mikhina	Kazakhstan	53.85	
3rd place, bronze medalist(s)	3	Quach Thi Lan	Vietnam	55.69	
4	2	Ghofrane Mohammad	Syria	55.73	
	4	Alaa Hikmat	Iraq	DQ	R163.3(b)
	1	Iman Isa Jassim	Bahrain	DNF	

=== 800 meters ===
Heats – 19 February

Rank	Heat	Name	Nationality	Time	Notes
1	1	Marta Hirpato	Bahrain	2:08.28	Q, PB
2	1	Tatyana Neroznak	Kazakhstan	2:08.86	Q
3	1	Nimali Liyanarachchi	Sri Lanka	2:09.26	q, PB
4	1	Kseniya Faiskanova	Kyrgyzstan	2:12.05	q, PB
5	2	Yume Kitamura	Japan	2:20.69	Q, PB
6	2	Arina Kleshchukova	Kyrgyzstan	2:20.84	Q, PB
7	1	Nicole Ann Isabella Yun Mun	Singapore	2:27.31	PB
8	2	Rabia Ashiq	Pakistan	2:27.44	SB
9	2	Iao Si Teng	Macau	2:32.80	PB

Final – 21 February

Rank	Name	Nationality	Time	Notes
1st place, gold medalist(s)	Marta Hirpato	Bahrain	2:04.59	PB
2nd place, silver medalist(s)	Nimali Liyanarachchi	Sri Lanka	2:04.88	PB
3rd place, bronze medalist(s)	Tatyana Neroznak	Kazakhstan	2:06.32	PB
4	Arina Kleshchukova	Kyrgyzstan	2:09.28	PB
5	Kseniya Faiskanova	Kyrgyzstan	2:10.93	PB
	Yume Kitamura	Japan	DQ	R163.3(a)

=== 1500 meters ===
19 February

Rank	Name	Nationality	Time	Notes
~~1~~	Betlhem Desalegn	United Arab Emirates	~~4:21.65~~	DQ
1st place, gold medalist(s)	Tigist Gashaw	Bahrain	4:22.17	
2nd place, silver medalist(s)	Sugandha Kumari	India	4:29.06	PB
3rd place, bronze medalist(s)	Eranga Rashila Dulakshi	Sri Lanka	4:37.10	PB
	Sabrieh Maradat	Jordan	DQ	R163.3b

=== 3000 meters ===
20 February

Rank	Name	Nationality	Time	Notes
~~1~~	Betlhem Desalegn	United Arab Emirates	~~8:44.59~~	~~NR~~, DQ
1st place, gold medalist(s)	Ruth Chebet	Bahrain	8:47.24	PB
2nd place, silver medalist(s)	Alia Saeed Mohammed	United Arab Emirates	8:48.62	SB
3rd place, bronze medalist(s)	Anju Takamizawa	Japan	9:44.58	PB
	Desi Mokonin	Bahrain	DNS	

=== 60 meters hurdles ===
Heats – 20 February

Rank	Heat	Name	Nationality	Time	Notes
1	2	Anastasiya Soprunova	Kazakhstan	8.19	Q
2	1	Anastasiya Pilipenko	Kazakhstan	8.21	Q
3	2	Govind Raj Gayathri	India	8.38	Q, NR
4	1	Valentina Kibalnikova	Uzbekistan	8.42	Q, SB
5	1	Masumi Aoki	Japan	8.42	Q, PB
6	1	Raja Nursheena Raja Azhar	Malaysia	8.57	q, PB
7	1	Elnaz Kompani	Iran	8.83	q
8	2	Jannah Wong Min	Singapore	8.88	Q, PB
9	2	Mazoon Al-Alawi	Oman	9.03	PB
10	2	Christel El Saneh	Lebanon	9.37	NR
11	1	Dlsoz Obaid Najim	Iraq	9.65	PB
	2	Lui Lai Yiu	Hong Kong	DQ	

Final – 21 February

Rank	Lane	Name	Nationality	Time	Notes
1st place, gold medalist(s)	5	Anastasiya Soprunova	Kazakhstan	8.17	
2nd place, silver medalist(s)	4	Anastasiya Pilipenko	Kazakhstan	8.17	
3rd place, bronze medalist(s)	6	Valentina Kibalnikova	Uzbekistan	8.32	PB
4	3	Govind Raj Gayathri	India	8.34	NR
5	8	Masumi Aoki	Japan	8.36	PB
6	7	Jannah Wong Min	Singapore	8.81	PB
7	1	Elnaz Kompani	Iran	8.82	
	2	Raja Nursheena Raja Azhar	Malaysia	DQ	

=== 4 x 400 meters relay ===
21 February

Rank	Nation	Athletes	Time	Notes
1st place, gold medalist(s)	Bahrain	Salwa Eid Nasser, Luwaseun Yusuf Jamal, Iman Isa Jassim, Kemi Adekoya	3:35.07	CR, AR
2nd place, silver medalist(s)	Iran	Farzaneh Fasihi, Sepideh Tavakoli, Elnaz Kompani, Maryam Toosi	4:06.51	
3rd place, bronze medalist(s)	Jordan	Rasem Hashem, Sabrieh Maradat, Aliya Boshnak, Ael Al-Qadi	4:10.55	NR

=== High jump ===
21 February

Rank	Name	Nationality	1.65	1.70	1.75	1.80	1.84	1.88	1.92	1.95	Results	Notes
1st place, gold medalist(s)	Svetlana Radzivil	Uzbekistan	–	–	o	o	o	xo	xxo	xxx	1.92	SB
2nd place, silver medalist(s)	Nadiya Dusanova	Uzbekistan	–	o	o	o	o	o	xxx		1.88	=SB
3rd place, bronze medalist(s)	Zheng Xingjuan	China	–	–	o	o	o	xxx			1.84	SB
4	Michelle Sng Suat Li	Singapore	–	o	o	xxx					1.75	NR
4	Yuki Mimura	Japan	o	o	o	xxx					1.75	SB
6	Yeung Man Wai	Hong Kong	o	o	xxx						1.70	PB
6	Regina Kaysarova	Kazakhstan	–	o	xxx						1.70	
8	Swapana Barman	India	xo	o	xxx						1.70	PB
9	Yap Sean Yee	Malaysia	o	xxo	xxx						1.70	PB
	Nadiah Al-Haqoan	Kuwait									DNS	

=== Pole vault ===
19 February

Rank	Name	Nationality	4.00	4.15	4.30	4.40	4.50	4.60	4.70	4.80	Results	Notes
1st place, gold medalist(s)	Li Ling	China	–	–	–	xo	o	o	o	xxx	4.70	CR, AR
2nd place, silver medalist(s)	Ren Mengqian	China	–	o	o	xxx					4.30	SB
3rd place, bronze medalist(s)	Tomomi Abiko	Japan	o	xo	xxx						4.15	SB

=== Long jump ===
19 February

Rank	Name	Nationality	#1	#2	#3	#4	#5	#6	Results	Notes
1st place, gold medalist(s)	Mayookha Johny	India	6.35	6.27	6.21	6.30	6.30	6.08	6.35	SB
2nd place, silver medalist(s)	Bui Thi Thu Thao	Vietnam	x	6.30	x	6.14	6.06	6.26	6.30	NR
3rd place, bronze medalist(s)	Olga Rypakova	Kazakhstan	6.22	x	–	x	6.11	–	6.22	SB
4	Yuliya Tarasova	Uzbekistan	x	x	6.11	x	6.21	6.17	6.21	
5	M. A. Prajusha	India	5.99	6.15	6.13	6.01	x	6.09	6.15	SB
6	Lu Minjia	China	6.00	5.73	5.77	x	6.09	5.92	6.09	SB
7	Chamali Dilrukshi	Sri Lanka	5.61	5.91	x	5.96	6.04	x	6.04	SB
8	Marestella Sunang	Philippines	6.03	x	x	5.99	6.01	x	6.03	SB
9	Anna Bulanova	Kyrgyzstan	5.80	x	5.84				5.84	SB
10	Yekaterina Ektova	Kazakhstan	5.52	x	5.57				5.57	
11	Noor Amira Mohd Nafiah	Malaysia	5.42	5.36	5.42				5.42	PB
12	Christel El Saneh	Lebanon	4.86	4.97	4.75				4.97	SB

=== Triple jump ===
20 February

Rank	Name	Nationality	#1	#2	#3	#4	#5	#6	Results	Notes
1st place, gold medalist(s)	Olga Rypakova	Kazakhstan	x	14.03	14.03	x	x	14.32	14.32	SB
2nd place, silver medalist(s)	Mayookha Johny	India	13.79	13.81	14.00	13.80	13.80	x	14.00	NR
3rd place, bronze medalist(s)	Irina Ektova	Kazakhstan	x	x	13.19	13.32	x	13.48	13.48	SB
4	Wang Wupin	China	12.68	x	13.26	13.03	12.91	13.42	13.42	SB
5	Li Xiaohong	China	x	12.14	13.12	12.99	13.14	x	13.14	SB
6	Tran Huy Hoa	Vietnam	x	x	x	x	x	x	NM	
7	M. A. Prajusha	India							DNS	

=== Shot put ===
19 February

Rank	Name	Nationality	#1	#2	#3	#4	#5	#6	Results	Notes
1st place, gold medalist(s)	Geng Shuang	China	16.90	18.06	16.77	17.07	x	17.25	18.06	PB
2nd place, silver medalist(s)	Guo Tianqian	China	17.32	17.20	x	17.42	17.44	17.27	17.44	
3rd place, bronze medalist(s)	Noora Salem Jassem	Bahrain	15.85	16.06	15.35	14.97	16.26	15.31	16.26	PB
4	Leyla Rajabi	Iran	15.58	15.60	15.73	16.02	15.84	15.94	16.02	
5	Aya Ota	Japan	14.36	x	14.81	15.27	15.24	14.82	15.27	PB
6	Manpreet Kaur	India	15.21	14.77	14.61	14.47	14.69	x	15.21	PB
7	Amina Al-Mannai	Qatar	9.68	10.90	11.08	10.54	10.60	10.85	11.08	PB

=== Pentathlon ===
21 February

The highest mark recorded in each event is highlighted in yellow

Rank	Athlete	Nationality	60m H	HJ	SP	LJ	800m	Points	Notes
1st place, gold medalist(s)	Ekaterina Voronina	Uzbekistan	9.00	1.81	13.57	5.85	2:25.2	4224	NR
2nd place, silver medalist(s)	Sepideh Tavakoli	Iran	9.03	1.72	13.40	5.33	2:34.3	3828	
3rd place, bronze medalist(s)	Chie Kiriyama	Japan	8.61	1.63	10.83	5.40	2:36.1	3637	
4	Irina Velihanova	Turkmenistan	9.40	1.60	10.14	5.30	2:23.4	3524	NR
5	Kristina Pronzhenko	Tajikistan	9.42	1.54	8.93	5.47	2:22.2	3435	NR
6	Aleksandra Yurkevskaya	Uzbekistan	9.48	1.69	10.21	4.96	2:35.1	3375	PB
7	Swapana Barman	India	8.85	1.78	11.38	5.74	DQ	3285	PB
8	Fatemeh Mazaher Sassanipoor	Qatar	9.86	1.33	8.93	4.37	3:12.1	2294	
