= 2023 Asian Athletics Championships – Men's shot put =

Men's shot put at the 2023 Asian Athletics Championships
- Venue: National Stadium
- Location: Bangkok, Thailand
- Dates: 14 July
- Competitors: 12 from 10 nations
- Winning distance: 20.23 m

Medalists
gold medal	Tajinderpal Singh Toor	India
silver medal	Mehdi Saberi	Iran
bronze medal	Ivan Ivanov	Kazakhstan

The men's shot put event at the 2023 Asian Athletics Championships was held on 14 July.

== Records ==
Records before the 2023 Asian Athletics Championships
Record	Athlete (nation)	Distance (m)	Location	Date
World record	Ryan Crouser (USA)	23.56	Los Angeles, United States	27 May 2023
Asian record	Tajinderpal Singh Toor (IND)	21.77	Bhubaneswar, India	19 June 2023
Championship record	Inderjeet Singh (IND)	20.41	Wuhan, China	3 June 2015
World leading	Ryan Crouser (USA)	23.56	Los Angeles, United States	27 May 2023
Asian leading	Tajinderpal Singh Toor (IND)	21.77	Bhubaneswar, India	19 June 2023

== Results ==
Rank	Name	Nationality	#1	#2	#3	#4	#5	#6	Result	Notes
1st place, gold medalist(s)	Tajinderpal Singh Toor	India	19.80	20.23	–	–	–	–	20.23	
2nd place, silver medalist(s)	Mehdi Saberi	Iran	19.13	19.20	19.05	19.74	19.98	x	19.98	PB
3rd place, bronze medalist(s)	Ivan Ivanov	Kazakhstan	18.33	18.75	19.41	x	19.87	19.19	19.87	
4	Tian Zhizhong	China	18.73	19.10	18.80	x	18.92	18.86	19.10	
5	Ma Hao-wei	Chinese Taipei	18.00	18.28	18.34	19.04	18.78	x	19.04	
6	Willie Morrison	Philippines	15.90	17.70	x	17.86	18.17	17.93	18.17	
7	Jung Il-woo	South Korea	17.61	17.76	x	x	x	x	17.76	
8	Jakkapat Niosri	Thailand	16.83	x	17.73	x	x	x	17.73	
9	Hitoshi Okumura	Japan	17.69	x	x				17.69	
10	Thongchai Silamool	Thailand	x	15.66	15.85				15.85	
	Eakkarin Boonlap	Thailand	x	x	x				NM	
	Mohamed Daouda Tolo	Saudi Arabia	x	x	x				NM	
