= Mohammed Abukhousa =

Palestinian sprinter

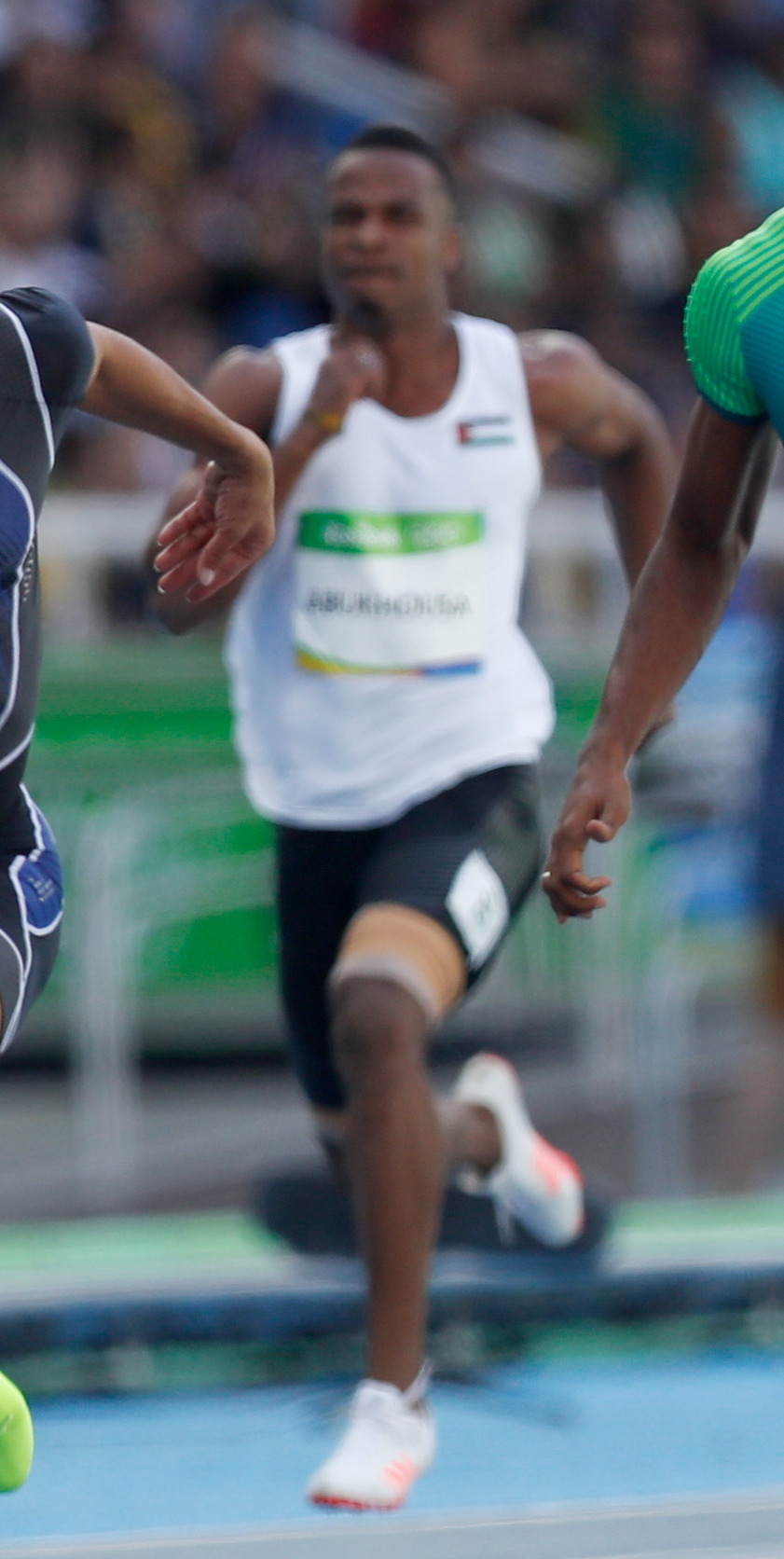
- Abukhousa at the 2016 Olympics

Personal information
- Nationality: Palestinian
- Born: 30 December 1992 (age 33) Gaza, Palestine
- Height: 1.70 m (5 ft 7 in)
- Weight: 67 kg (148 lb)

Sport
- Sport: Track and field
- Events: 100 m, 200 m

Mohammed Abukhousa (born 30 December 1992) is a Palestinian sprinter. He competed at the 2013 and 2015 World Championships and at the 2016 Summer Olympics without advancing from the first round.

== Personal bests ==
Outdoor

- 100 metres – 10.55 (-0.3 m/s, Strasbourg 2014) NR
- 200 metres – 21.26 (-0.3 m/s, Colmar 2014) NR

Indoor

- 60 metres – 6.77 (Doha 2016) NR

== International competitions ==
| Year | Competition | Venue | Position | Event | Notes |
Representing Palestine
| 2013 | World Championships | Moscow, Russia | 14th (p) | 100 m | 10.87 |
| 2014 | Asian Games | Incheon, South Korea | 20th (h) | 100 m | 10.80 |
| 2015 | World Championships | Beijing, China | 47th (h) | 200 m | 21.36 |
| 2016 | Asian Indoor Championships | Doha, Qatar | 7th | 60 m | 6.89 |
| 2016 | Olympic Games | Rio de Janeiro | 69th (h) | 100 m | 11.89 |
