= 2002 Asian Athletics Championships – Men's shot put =

The men's shot put event at the 2002 Asian Athletics Championships was held in Colombo, Sri Lanka on 11 August.

== Results ==
Rank	Name	Nationality	Result	Notes
1st place, gold medalist(s)	Bilal Saad Mubarak	Qatar	19.22	SB
2nd place, silver medalist(s)	Navpreet Singh	India	18.97	
3rd place, bronze medalist(s)	Kim Jae-Il	South Korea	17.98	
4	Jia Peng	China	17.78	
5	Ibrahim Al-Manai	Qatar	17.42	
6	Ahmad Gholoum	Kuwait	17.37	
7	Jaiveer Singh	India	17.02	
8	Hidehiro Sakakibara	Japan	16.66	
9	Huang Yang-Sheng	Chinese Taipei	16.53	
10	Dong Enxin	Singapore	16.01	
11	Chang Ming-Huang	Chinese Taipei	15.70	
12	S.A.P. Silva	Sri Lanka	13.99	PB
13	Surath De Zoysa	Sri Lanka	13.04	PB
14	Amila Perera	Sri Lanka	12.61	PB
