= Amin Nikfar =

Iranian-American shot putter (born 1981)

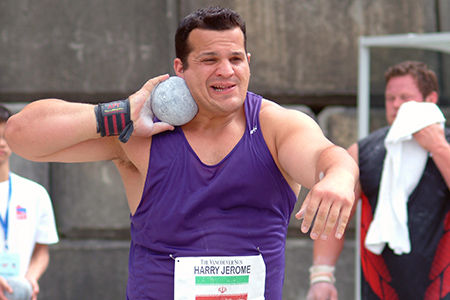

Personal information
- Born: January 2, 1981 (age 45)
- Height: 1.98 m (6 ft 6 in)
- Weight: 130 kg (287 lb)

Sport
- Country: Iran
- Sport: Athletics
- Event: Shot put
Medal record
Asian Indoor Games
Gold medal – first place	2009 Hanoi	Shot put
Asian Indoor Championships
Gold medal – first place	2004 Tehran	Shot put
Islamic Solidarity Games
Silver medal – second place	2005 Mecca	Shot put
- Updated on 15 August 2012

Amin Abraham Paul Nikfar (Persian: امین آبراهام پل نیک‌فر, born 2 January 1981 in San Jose, United States) is an Iranian-American shot putter. He graduated from the University of California, Berkeley in 2004 where he was a member of the Pi Lambda Phi fraternity.

Amin finished 1st (Gold) in the 2004 Asian Indoor Championships. He finished tenth at the 2005 Asian Championships. He also competed at the 2008 Olympic Games without reaching the final.

His personal best throw is 20.05 metres, achieved in July 2011 in Toronto. This is the current Iranian national record.

Amin is the son of Mohammad Nikfar and Diane Nikfar.

Amin received The Big Pi Award in 2012 from Pi Lambda Phi fraternity. It is awarded to alumni Brothers who are held in high esteem by virtue of outstanding accomplishment which brings honor to the Brother and Pi Lambda Phi. It is the "lifetime achievement award" for Pilam and the Big Pi Chapter has become a "who's who" of well-regarded and famous Pilam alumni.

He competed at the London Olympics, but again failed to reach the final.

== Competition record ==
Year	Competition	Venue	Position	Event	Notes
Representing Iran
2003	Asian Championships	Manila, Philippines	10th	Shot put	17.37 m
2004	Asian Indoor Championships	Tehran, Iran	1st	Shot put	18.33 m
2005	Islamic Solidarity Games	Mecca, Saudi Arabia	2nd	Shot put	18.73 m
2005	Asian Championships	Incheon, South Korea	10th	Shot put	17.29 m
2008	Olympic Games	Beijing, China	–	Shot put	NM
2009	Asian Indoor Games	Hanoi, Vietnam	1st	Shot put	19.66 m
2009	Asian Championships	Guangzhou, China	8th	Shot put	18.30 m
2010	West Asian Championships	Aleppo, Syria	1st	Shot put	19.63 m
2010	Asian Games	Guangzhou, China	5th	Shot put	19.08 m
2011	World Championships	Daegu, South Korea	23rd (q)	Shot put	19.18 m
2012	World Indoor Championships	Istanbul, Turkey	16th (q)	Shot put	18.97 m
2012	Olympic Games	London, United Kingdom	32nd (q)	Shot put	18.62 m
2014	Asian Games	Incheon, South Korea	4th	Shot put	19.02 m
