= Sergey Dementev =

Uzbekistani shot putter (born 1990)

Personal information
- Born: 1 June 1990 (age 36)
- Height: 1.88 m (6 ft 2 in)
- Weight: 120 kg (265 lb)

Sport
- Sport: Athletics
- Event: Shot put

Sergey Dementev (Uzbek: Сергей Дементьев; born 1 June 1990) is an Uzbekistani athlete specialising in the shot put. He won a bronze medal at the 2017 Islamic Solidarity Games.

His personal bests in the event are 19.37 metres outdoors (Almaty 2015) and 18.95 metres indoors (Tashkent 2017).

== International competitions ==
Year	Competition	Venue	Position	Event	Notes
Representing Uzbekistan
2007	World Youth Championships	Ostrava, Czech Republic	9th	Shot put (5 kg)	18.71 m
2008	Asian Junior Championships	Jakarta, Indonesia	2nd	Shot put (6 kg)	18.43 m
2008	World Junior Championships	Bydgoszcz, Poland	22nd (q)	Shot put (6 kg)	17.92 m
2009	Asian Championships	Guangzhou, China	6th	Shot put	16.54 m
2013	Asian Championships	Pune, India	6th	Shot put	18.59 m
2014	Asian Indoor Championships	Hangzhou, China	6th	Shot put	17.83 m
2014	Asian Games	Incheon, South Korea	10th	Shot put	15.66 m
2015	Asian Championships	Wuhan, China	8th	Shot put	17.47 m
2016	Asian Indoor Championships	Doha, Qatar	5th	Shot put	17.73 m
2017	Islamic Solidarity Games	Baku, Azerbaijan	3rd	Shot put	18.56 m
2017	Asian Championships	Bhubaneswar, India	11th	Shot put	17.06 m
2017	Asian Indoor and Martial Arts Games	Ashgabat, Turkmenistan	4th	Shot put	18.87 m
2018	Asian Indoor Championships	Tehran, Iran	9th	Shot put	17.53 m
2019	Asian Championships	Doha, Qatar	11th	Shot put	16.27 m
