= Athletics at the 2022 Asian Games – Men's shot put =

Men's shot put at the 2022 Asian Games
- Venue: Hangzhou Olympic Expo Main Stadium
- Date: 1 October 2023
- Competitors: 13 from 12 nations

Medalists
gold medal	Tajinderpal Singh Toor	India
silver medal	Mohammed Tolo	Saudi Arabia
bronze medal	Liu Yang	China

The men's shot put competition at the 2022 Asian Games took place on 1 October 2023 at the HOC Stadium, Hangzhou.

== Schedule ==
All times are China Standard Time (UTC+08:00)

Date	Time	Event
Sunday, 1 October 2023	19:00	Final

== Records ==
Prior to this competition, the existing world, Asian and Games records were as follows.

World Record	Ryan Crouser (USA)	23.37	Eugene, United States	18 June 2021
Asian Record	Tajinderpal Singh Toor (IND)	21.77	Bhubaneswar, India	19 June 2023
Games Record	Tajinderpal Singh Toor (IND)	20.75	Jakarta, Indonesia	25 August 2018

== Results ==
Rank	Athlete	Attempt						Result	Notes
Rank	Athlete	1	2	3	4	5	6	Result	Notes
1st place, gold medalist(s)	Tajinderpal Singh Toor (IND)	X	X	19.51	20.06	X	20.36	20.36	
2nd place, silver medalist(s)	Mohammed Tolo (KSA)	19.54	19.56	19.93	20.18	19.47	19.83	20.18	
3rd place, bronze medalist(s)	Liu Yang (CHN)	19.07	18.79	18.66	19.97	19.24	X	19.97	
4	Abdelrahman Mahmoud (BRN)	19.67	19.28	19.70	19.58	X	19.74	19.74	
5	Mehdi Saberi (IRI)	18.44	19.41	X	19.30	X	X	19.41	
6	Ma Hau-wei (TPE)	18.44	18.90	X	18.91	18.88	18.69	18.91	
7	Ivan Ivanov (KAZ)	X	17.78	17.77	X	18.68	X	18.68	
8	Sahib Singh (IND)	17.78	17.79	17.90	18.18	X	18.62	18.62	
9	Jung Il-woo (KOR)	17.19	X	17.72				17.72	
10	Jakkapat Noisri (THA)	17.24	X	X				17.24	
11	William Morrison (PHI)	15.66	16.98	16.68				16.98	
12	Musaeb Al-Momani (JOR)	15.43	15.67	15.48				15.67	
13	Sim Samedy (CAM)	13.94	13.68	13.71				13.94	
