= Liu Yang (shot putter) =

Chinese shot putter (born 1986)

Personal information
- Born: 29 October 1986 (age 39)
- Height: 1.90 m (6 ft 3 in)
- Weight: 133 kg (293 lb)

Sport
- Sport: Athletics
- Event: Shot put
Medal record
Men's athletics
Representing China
Asian Indoor Championships
Gold medal – first place	2016 Doha	Shot put

Liu Yang (Chinese: 刘洋; pinyin: Liú Yáng; born 29 October 1986) is a Chinese athlete specialising in the shot put. He won a silver medal at the 2018 Asian Games. In addition, he won a gold medal at the 2016 Asian Indoor Championships.

His personal bests in the event are 19.77 metres outdoors (Shenyang 2013) and 19.50 metres indoors (Nanjing 2013).

== International competitions ==
Year	Competition	Venue	Position	Event	Notes
Representing China
2015	Asian Championships	Wuhan, China	4th	Shot put	19.23 m
2016	Asian Indoor Championships	Doha, Qatar	1st	Shot put	19.30 m
2017	Asian Indoor and Martial Arts Games	Ashgabat, Turkmenistan	7th	Shot put	18.24 m
2018	Asian Games	Jakarta, Indonesia	2nd	Shot put	19.52 m
2023	Asian Games	Hangzhou, China	3rd	Shot put	19.97 m
