= Athletics at the 2018 Asian Games – Men's shot put =

Men's shot put at the 2018 Asian Games
- Venue: Gelora Bung Karno Stadium
- Date: 25 August 2018
- Competitors: 11 from 8 nations

Medalists
gold medal	Tajinderpal Singh Toor	India
silver medal	Liu Yang	China
bronze medal	Ivan Ivanov	Kazakhstan

The men's shot put competition at the 2018 Asian Games took place on 25 August 2018 at the Gelora Bung Karno Stadium.

== Schedule ==
All times are Western Indonesia Time (UTC+07:00)

Date	Time	Event
Saturday, 25 August 2018	20:00	Final

== Records ==
Prior to this competition, the existing world, Asian and Games records were as follows.

World Record	Randy Barnes (USA)	23.12	Los Angeles, United States	20 May 1990
Asian Record	Sultan Al-Hebshi (KSA)	21.13	Doha, Qatar	8 May 2009
Games Record	Sultan Al-Hebshi (KSA)	20.57	Guangzhou, China	26 November 2010

== Results ==
Legend

- NM — No mark

Rank	Athlete	Attempt						Result	Notes
Rank	Athlete	1	2	3	4	5	6	Result	Notes
1st place, gold medalist(s)	Tajinderpal Singh Toor (IND)	19.96	19.15	X	19.96	20.75	20.00	20.75	GR
2nd place, silver medalist(s)	Liu Yang (CHN)	19.42	19.31	19.52	18.82	19.37	X	19.52	
3rd place, bronze medalist(s)	Ivan Ivanov (KAZ)	18.83	19.40	X	18.84	X	19.20	19.40	
4	Jung Il-woo (KOR)	19.15	18.92	18.75	18.84	X	19.07	19.15	
5	Chang Ming-huang (TPE)	18.53	X	18.51	18.26	18.98	X	18.98	
6	Li Jun (CHN)	17.99	18.43	18.16	18.00	18.30	18.59	18.59	
7	Ali Samari (IRI)	X	X	17.49	X	X	18.21	18.21	
8	Promrob Juntima (THA)	X	15.98	15.88	16.22	X	15.92	16.22	
9	Thawat Khachin (THA)	15.06	X	15.14				15.14	
—	Sultan Al-Hebshi (KSA)	X	X	X				NM	
—	Shahin Mehrdelan (IRI)	X	X	X				NM	
