= 1990 World Junior Championships in Athletics – Men's shot put =

The men's shot put event at the 1990 World Junior Championships in Athletics was held in Plovdiv, Bulgaria, at Deveti Septemvri Stadium on 10 and 11 August. A 7257g (Senior implement) shot was used.

== Medalists ==
Gold	Viktor Bulat; Soviet Union
Silver	Xie Shengying; China
Bronze	Yuriy Ivanov; Soviet Union

== Results ==
=== Final ===
11 August

Rank	Name	Nationality	Attempts						Result	Notes
Rank	Name	Nationality	1	2	3	4	5	6	Result	Notes
1st place, gold medalist(s)	Viktor Bulat	Soviet Union	x	17.72	19.21	x	x	x	19.21	
2nd place, silver medalist(s)	Xie Shengying	China	18.32	x	18.13	18.06	18.01	18.57	18.57	
3rd place, bronze medalist(s)	Yuriy Ivanov	Soviet Union	18.13	x	x	x	x	x	18.13	
4	Victor Roca	Spain	x	16.90	17.40	16.08	x	17.70	17.70	
5	Joe Bailey	United States	16.86	16.72	16.91	17.20	x	16.38	17.20	
6	Bilal Saad Mubarak	Qatar	16.85	x	16.72	x	15.60	x	16.85	
7	Ventsislav Velichkov	Bulgaria	16.81	x	16.83	x	x	x	16.83	
8	Arpad Konyi	Hungary	16.63	16.48	16.52	x	16.06	16.29	16.66	
9	Sergio Moliner	Spain	16.26	16.22	16.54				16.54	
10	Courtney Ireland	New Zealand	x	16.49	16.14				16.49	
11	David Winkler	United States	16.28	16.26	16.43				16.43	
12	Dirk Büchner	East Germany	16.39	15.99	x				16.39	

=== Qualifications ===
10 Aug

==== Group A ====
Rank	Name	Nationality	Attempts			Result	Notes
Rank	Name	Nationality	1	2	3	Result	Notes
1	Viktor Bulat	Soviet Union	18.43	-	-	18.43	Q
2	Xie Shengying	China	16.93	-	-	16.93	Q
3	Bilal Saad Mubarak	Qatar	16.73	-	-	16.73	Q
4	Yuriy Ivanov	Soviet Union	16.66	-	-	16.66	Q
5	Dirk Büchner	East Germany	16.07	16.53	-	16.53	Q
6	Victor Roca	Spain	16.47	-	-	16.47	Q
7	Joe Bailey	United States	16.45	-	-	16.45	Q
8	Ventsislav Velichkov	Bulgaria	16.33	-	-	16.33	Q
9	Arpad Konyi	Hungary	16.08	16.26	-	16.26	Q
10	David Winkler	United States	15.98	15.97	16.21	16.21	Q
11	Sergio Moliner	Spain	x	16.17	16.15	16.17	q
12	Courtney Ireland	New Zealand	x	x	16.08	16.08	q
13	Jens Frässdorf	East Germany	16.06	16.02	x	16.06	
14	Miroslav Menc	Czechoslovakia	16.05	15.75	16.02	16.05	
15	Ralf Kahles	West Germany				15.92	
16	Jaroslav Žitnanský	Czechoslovakia				15.79	
17	Mavroudis Filipides	Greece				15.77	
18	Quinn Magnuson	Canada				15.62	
19	Matt Gadsby	Australia				15.28	
20	Desi Singh	India				14.93	

== Participation ==
According to an unofficial count, 20 athletes from 15 countries participated in the event.

- Australia (1)
- Bulgaria (1)
- Canada (1)
- China (1)
- Czechoslovakia (2)
- East Germany (2)
- Greece (1)
- Hungary (1)
- India (1)
- New Zealand (1)
- Qatar (1)
- Soviet Union (2)
- Spain (2)
- United States (2)
- West Germany (1)
