= Ivan Ivanov (shot putter) =

Kazakhstani shot putter (born 1992)

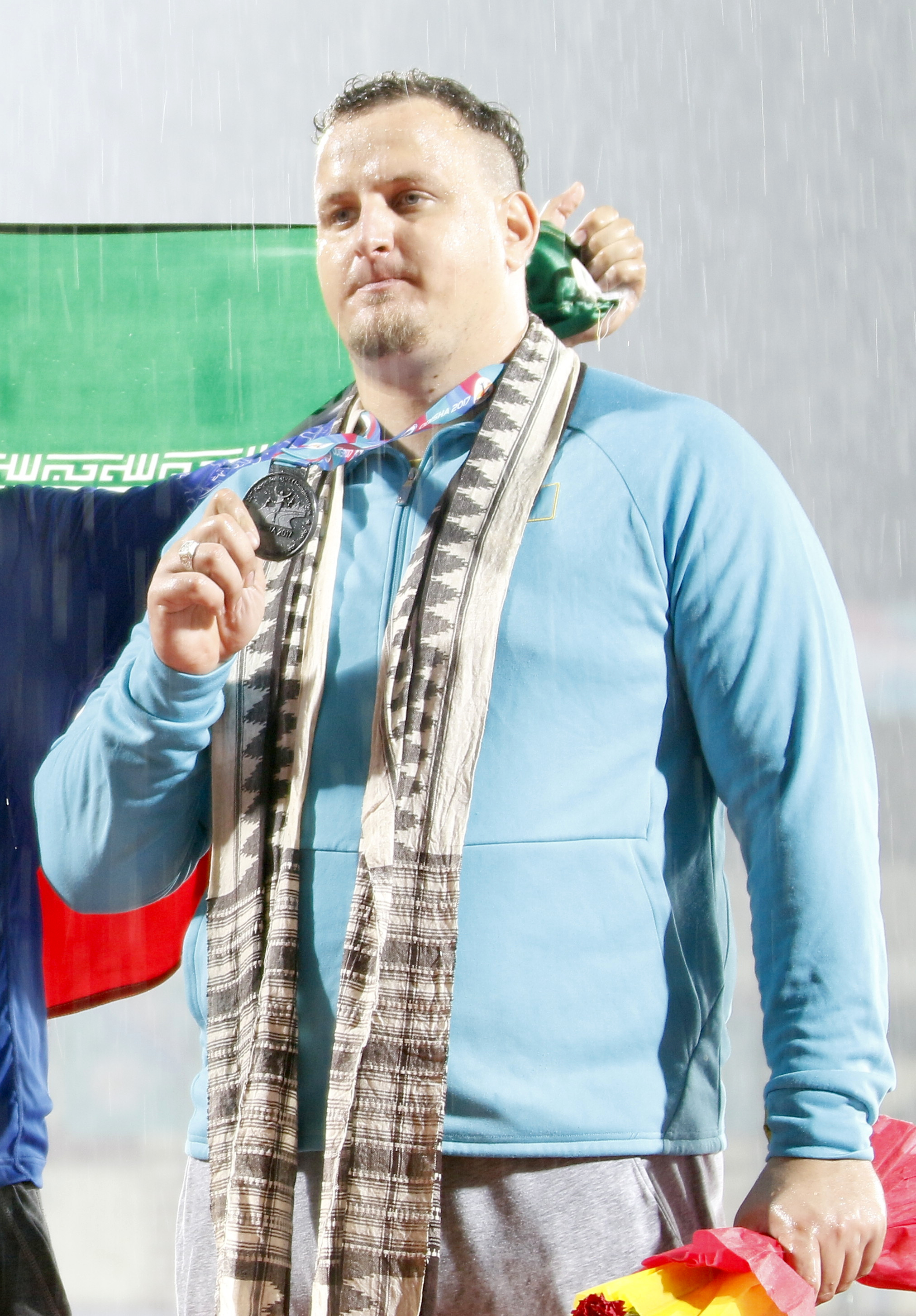
- Ivanov at the 2017 Asian Championships

Personal information
- Born: 3 January 1992 (age 34) Ushtobe, Kazakhstan
- Education: Zhetysu State University
- Height: 2.03 m (6 ft 8 in)
- Weight: 160 kg (353 lb)

Sport
- Sport: Athletics
- Event: Shot put
- Coached by: Vladimir Zinchenko (personal); Viktor Evsyukov (personal)
Medal record
Men's athletics
Representing Kazakhstan
Asian Indoor Championships
Silver medal – second place	2024 Tehran	Shot put

Ivan Ivanov (Kazakh or Russian: Иван Иванов; born 3 January 1992) is a Kazakhstani shot putter. He competed at the 2016 Summer Olympics without qualifying for the final. Ivanov won bronze medals at the 2017 Asian Championships and 2018 Asian Games. His personal bests in the event are 20.95 metres outdoors (Almaty 2019) and 20.51 metres indoors (Ust-Kamenogorsk 2016), both being the current national records.

Ivanov took up shot put in 2006 following his brother. A month later, aged 14, he competed at his first national championships. He regularly trains in Portugal because his coach Vladimir Zinchenko is based in that country.

== International competitions ==
Year	Competition	Venue	Position	Event	Notes
Representing Kazakhstan
2009	World Youth Championships	Brixen, Italy	32nd (q)	Shot put (5 kg)	16.53 m
2009	World Youth Championships	Brixen, Italy	–	Discus throw (1.5 kg)	NM
2010	Asian Junior Championships	Hanoi, Vietnam	5th	Shot put (6 kg)	16.12 m
2010	Asian Junior Championships	Hanoi, Vietnam	6th	Discus throw (1.75 kg)	50.75 m
2012	Asian Indoor Championships	Hangzhou, China	6th	Shot put	17.74 m
2013	Asian Championships	Pune, India	7th	Shot put	18.34 m
2014	Asian Beach Games	Phuket, Thailand	3rd	Shot put	17.42 m
2015	Asian Championships	Wuhan, China	7th	Shot put	17.78 m
2016	Olympic Games	Rio de Janeiro, Brazil	33rd (q)	Shot put	17.38 m
2017	Asian Championships	Bhubaneswar, India	3rd	Shot put	19.41 m
2017	Universiade	Taipei, Taiwan	14th (q)	Shot put	17.22 m
2017	Asian Indoor and Martial Arts Games	Ashgabat, Turkmenistan	1st	Shot put	19.60 m
2018	Asian Indoor Championships	Tehran, Iran	5th	Shot put	18.31 m
2018	Asian Games	Jakarta, Indonesia	3rd	Shot put	19.40 m
2019	Asian Championships	Doha, Qatar	3rd	Shot put	19.09 m
2019	World Championships	Doha, Qatar	30th (q)	Shot put	19.73 m
2023	Asian Indoor Championships	Astana, Kazakhstan	4th	Shot put	18.10 m
2023	Asian Championships	Bangkok, Thailand	3rd	Shot put	19.87 m
2023	Asian Games	Hangzhou, China	7th	Shot put	18.68 m
2024	Asian Indoor Championships	Tehran, Iran	2nd	Shot put	19.08 m
2025	Asian Championships	Gumi, South Korea	11th	Shot put	17.92 m
