= Mehdi Shahrokhi =

Iranian shot putter (born 1985)

Seyed Mahdi Shahrokhi (Persian: سید مهدی شاهرخی; born 23 May 1985) is an Iranian athlete specializing in the shot put. He won several medals at the regional level.

He has a personal best of 19.57 meters outdoors (2007) and 18.32 meters indoors (2009).

== Competition record ==
Year	Competition	Venue	Position	Event	Notes
Representing Iran
2002	Asian Junior Championships	Bangkok, Thailand	6th	Shot put (6 kg)	17.03 m
2004	Asian Junior Championships	Ipoh, Malaysia	1st	Shot put (6 kg)	19.99 m
2004	World Junior Championships	Grosseto, Italy	4th	Shot put (6 kg)	19.80 m
2005	Islamic Solidarity Games	Mecca, Saudi Arabia	3rd	Shot put	18.27 m
2005	Universiade	İzmir, Turkey	7th	Shot put	18.24 m
2005	Asian Championships	Incheon, South Korea	4th	Shot put	18.85 m
2005	Asian Indoor Games	Pattaya, Thailand	2nd	Shot put	18.33 m
2006	Asian Games	Doha, Qatar	8th	Shot put	17.50 m
2007	Asian Championships	Amman, Jordan	4th	Shot put	18.80 m
2007	Universiade	Bangkok, Thailand	4th	Shot put	19.15 m
2007	Asian Indoor Games	Macau	3rd	Shot put	18.48 m
2009	Asian Indoor Games	Hanoi, Vietnam	6th	Shot put	18.32 m
