= Sergey Rubtsov =

Kazakhstani shot putter (born 1965)

Medal record

Men's athletics

Representing Kazakhstan

Asian Championships
Silver medal – second place	1995 Jakarta	Shot put

Asian Indoor Championships
Bronze medal – third place	2006 Pattaya	Shot put

Sergey Rubtsov (born 4 September 1965) is a retired Kazakhstani athlete specializing in the shot put. He twice represented his country at the Olympic Games, in 1996 and 2000 without reaching the final round. He was born in the Russian SSR of the Soviet Union.

His personal bests are 20.49 metres outdoors and 20.47 metres indoors, both from 1992 and standing national records.

== Competition record ==
Year	Competition	Venue	Position	Notes
Representing Kazakhstan
1993	World Championships	Stuttgart, Germany	20th (q)	18.84 m
1994	Asian Games	Hiroshima, Japan	2nd	19.24 m
1995	World Indoor Championships	Barcelona, Spain	16th	18.08 m
1995	Asian Championships	Jakarta, Indonesia	2nd	18.66 m
1995	World Championships	Gothenburg, Sweden	16th (q)	18.81 m
1996	Olympic Games	Atlanta, United States	–	NM
1997	East Asian Games	Busan, South Korea	1st	19.47 m
1997	World Championships	Athens, Greece	25th (q)	18.16 m
1998	Asian Games	Bangkok, Thailand	3rd	18.79 m
2000	Asian Championships	Jakarta, Indonesia	9th	16.36 m
2000	Olympic Games	Sydney, Australia	37th (q)	15.90 m
2003	Asian Championships	Manila, Philippines	5th	17.92 m
2006	Asian Indoor Championships	Pattaya, Thailand	3rd	16.89 m
