= 2002 Asian Athletics Championships – Men's discus throw =

The men's discus throw event at the 2002 Asian Athletics Championships was held in Colombo, Sri Lanka on 12 August.

== Results ==
Rank	Name	Nationality	Result	Notes
1st place, gold medalist(s)	Rashid Shafi Al-Dosari	Qatar	64.43	NR
2nd place, silver medalist(s)	Abbas Samimi	Iran	60.49	SB
3rd place, bronze medalist(s)	Tulake Nuermaimaiti	China	60.39	SB
4	Khalid Habash Al-Suwaidi	Qatar	57.74	
5	Hridayanand Singh	India	55.34	
6	Chang Ming-Huang	Chinese Taipei	52.94	
7	Talavou Alaileema	Sri Lanka	51.61	SB
8	Jun Fujiwara	Japan	50.74	
9	Choi Jong-Bum	South Korea	50.38	
10	Gayan Upendra Jayawardana	Sri Lanka	48.21	SB
11	A.H.M. Jayakody	Sri Lanka	43.65	PB
