= Athletics at the 1998 Asian Games – Men's shot put =

Men's shot put at the 1998 Asian Games
- Venue: Thammasat Stadium
- Dates: 14 December 1998
- Competitors: 8 from 6 nations

Medalists
gold medal	Liu Hao	China
silver medal	Shakti Singh	India
bronze medal	Sergey Rubtsov	Kazakhstan

The men's shot put competition at the 1998 Asian Games in Bangkok, Thailand, was held on 14 December at the Thammasat Stadium.

== Schedule ==
All times are Indochina Time (UTC+07:00)

Date	Time	Event
Monday, 14 December 1998	14:30	Final

== Results ==
Rank	Athlete	Result	Notes
1st place, gold medalist(s)	Liu Hao (CHN)	19.20	
2nd place, silver medalist(s)	Shakti Singh (IND)	18.81	
3rd place, bronze medalist(s)	Sergey Rubtsov (KAZ)	18.79	
4	Bahadur Singh Sagoo (IND)	18.21	
5	Sergey Kot (UZB)	17.91	
6	Yasutada Noguchi (JPN)	17.29	
7	Wunsawang Sawusdee (THA)	16.84	
8	Chatchawal Polyiam (THA)	16.04	
