= 2005 Asian Athletics Championships – Men's shot put =

The men's shot put event at the 2005 Asian Athletics Championships was held in Incheon, South Korea on September 4.

== Results ==
Rank	Name	Nationality	Result	Notes
1st place, gold medalist(s)	Khalid Habash Al-Suwaidi	Qatar	19.45	
2nd place, silver medalist(s)	Navpreet Singh	India	19.40	
3rd place, bronze medalist(s)	Zhang Qi	China	19.02	
4	Mehdi Shahrokhi	Iran	18.85	SB
5	Sultan Al-Hebshi	Saudi Arabia	18.62	
6	Ahmad Hassan Gholoum	Kuwait	17.92	SB
7	Shakti Singh	India	17.88	
8	Shon Hyun	South Korea	17.65	
9	Hwang In-Sung	South Korea	17.45	
10	Amin Nikfar	Iran	17.29	
11	Meshari Suroor Saad	Kuwait	16.79	
12	Sarayudh Pinitjit	Thailand	16.52	
13	Ma Kam Cheong	Macau	12.33	
