= Jung Il-woo (athlete) =

South Korean shot putter

Personal information
- Born: 28 March 1986 (age 39)
- Height: 1.85 m (6 ft 1 in)
- Weight: 110 kg (243 lb)

Sport
- Sport: Athletics
- Event: Shot put

Jung Il-woo (Korean: 정일우; born 28 March 1986) is a South Korean athlete specialising in the shot put. He won a bronze medal at the 2017 Asian Indoor and Martial Arts Games.

His personal bests in the event are 19.49 metres outdoors (Sapporo 2015) and 19.24 metres indoors (Ashgabat 2017). Both are current national records.

== International competitions ==
Year	Competition	Venue	Position	Event	Notes
Representing South Korea
2010	Asian Games	Guangzhou, China	9th	Shot put	16.94 m
2014	Asian Games	Incheon, South Korea	8th	Shot put	18.17 m
2016	Asian Indoor Championships	Doha, Qatar	6th	Shot put	17.45 m
2017	Asian Indoor and Martial Arts Games	Ashgabat, Turkmenistan	3rd	Shot put	19.24 m
2018	Asian Games	Jakarta, Indonesia	4th	Shot put	19.15 m
2019	Asian Championships	Doha, Qatar	6th	Shot put	18.64 m
2023	Asian Championships	Bangkok, Thailand	7th	Shot put	17.76 m
2023	Asian Games	Hangzhou, China	9th	Shot put	17.72 m
