= Bilal Saad Mubarak =

Qatari shot putter (1972–2018)

Medal record

Men's athletics

Representing Qatar

Asian Championships
| Gold medal – first place | 1995 Jakarta | Shot put |
| Gold medal – first place | 1998 Fukuoka | Shot put |
| Gold medal – first place | 2002 Colombo | Shot put |
| Gold medal – first place | 2003 Manila | Shot put |
| Silver medal – second place | 1991 Kuala Lumpur | Shot put |
| Silver medal – second place | 1993 Manila | Shot put |
| Silver medal – second place | 2000 Jakarta | Shot put |

Bilal Saad Mubarak (Arabic: بلال سعد مُبارك; 18 December 1972 – 27 October 2018) was a Qatari shot putter. His best finishes include eleventh place at the 1995 World Championships and tenth place at the 1996 Olympic Games. He also has silver medals from the Asian Championships in 1991, 1993 and 2000 and gold medals from 1995, 1998, 2002 and 2003, as well as a silver medal from the 2002 Asian Games.

Other regional achievements include gold at the Pan Arab Games in 1992, 1997 and 1999, gold at the West Asian Games in 2002 and 2005 and gold at the Pan Arab Championships every two years between 1991 and 2003. His personal best is 19.65 metres, achieved in September 1997 in Taïf. He died on 27 October 2018 at the age of 45

== Achievements ==
| Year | Competition | Venue | Position | Notes |
Representing Qatar
| 1990 | Asian Junior Championships | Beijing, China | 3rd | 16.48 m |
| 1990 | World Junior Championships | Plovdiv, Bulgaria | 6th | 16.85 m |
| 1991 | Asian Championships | Kuala Lumpur, Malaysia | 2nd | 17.78 m |
| 1992 | Olympic Games | Barcelona, Spain | 24th (q) | 16.98 m |
| 1993 | Asian Championships | Manila, Philippines | 2nd | 18.28 m |
| 1994 | Asian Games | Hiroshima, Japan | 5th | 18.09 m |
| 1995 | Asian Championships | Jakarta, Indonesia | 1st | 18.87 m |
| 1995 | World Championships | Gothenburg, Sweden | 11th | 18.56 m |
| 1996 | Olympic Games | Atlanta, United States | 10th | 19.33 m |
| 1997 | World Indoor Championships | Paris, France | 21st (q) | 18.29 m |
| 1997 | World Championships | Athens, Greece | 17th (q) | 19.08 m |
| 1998 | Asian Championships | Fukuoka, Japan | 1st | 19.17 m |
| 2000 | Asian Championships | Jakarta, Indonesia | 2nd | 19.23 m |
| 2000 | Olympic Games | Sydney, Australia | 34th (q) | 18.30 m |
| 2002 | West Asian Games | Kuwait City, Kuwait | 1st | 19.10 m |
| 2002 | Asian Championships | Colombo, Sri Lanka | 1st | 19.22 m |
| 2002 | Asian Games | Busan, South Korea | 2nd | 18.98 m |
| 2003 | Asian Championships | Manila, Philippines | 1st | 19.41 m |
| 2005 | West Asian Games | Doha, Qatar | 1st | 17.54 m |
