= Athletics at the 2015 Summer Universiade – Men's shot put =

The men's shot put event at the 2015 Summer Universiade was held on 8 July at the Gwangju Universiade Main Stadium.

== Results ==
Rank	Athlete	Nationality	#1	#2	#3	#4	#5	#6	Result	Notes
1st place, gold medalist(s)	Inderjeet Singh	India	x	18.79	18.95	18.30	19.80	20.27	20.27	
2nd place, silver medalist(s)	Andrei Gag	Romania	19.75	x	19.37	x	19.28	19.92	19.92	
3rd place, bronze medalist(s)	Aleksandr Bulanov	Russia	19.84	19.75	19.52	19.23	19.27	19.43	19.84	
4	Mikhail Abramchuk	Belarus	18.68	18.59	19.48	19.19	18.92	19.09	19.48	
5	Tajinderpal Singh Toor	India	19.24	18.90	x	x	18.17	x	19.24	PB
6	Jaco Engelbrecht	South Africa	19.20	x	18.36	x	x	x	19.20	
7	Šarūnas Banevičius	Lithuania	17.99	18.06	18.66	x	x	x	18.66	SB
8	Guo Yanxiang	China	18.28	18.43	18.27	18.30	18.39	18.10	18.43	
9	Konstantin Lyadusov	Russia	x	x	18.43				18.43	
10	Braheme Days	United States	18.40	x	x				18.40	
11	Nicolas Martina	Argentina	16.49	17.29	16.57				17.29	
12	Francisco Belo	Portugal	x	16.02	17.06				17.06	
13	Kenneth Hudlebusch	Denmark	16.62	16.66	16.45				16.66	
14	Mathieu Marcoccia	Canada	15.95	x	16.28				16.28	
15	Lee Hyung-geun	South Korea	16.17	x	15.82				16.17	
16	Charbel Saad	Lebanon	12.47	x	12.58				12.58	
	Saleem Fadel	Qatar	x	x	x				NM	
	Stephen Mozia	Nigeria							DNS	
