= Ali Samari =

Iranian shot putter (born 1993)

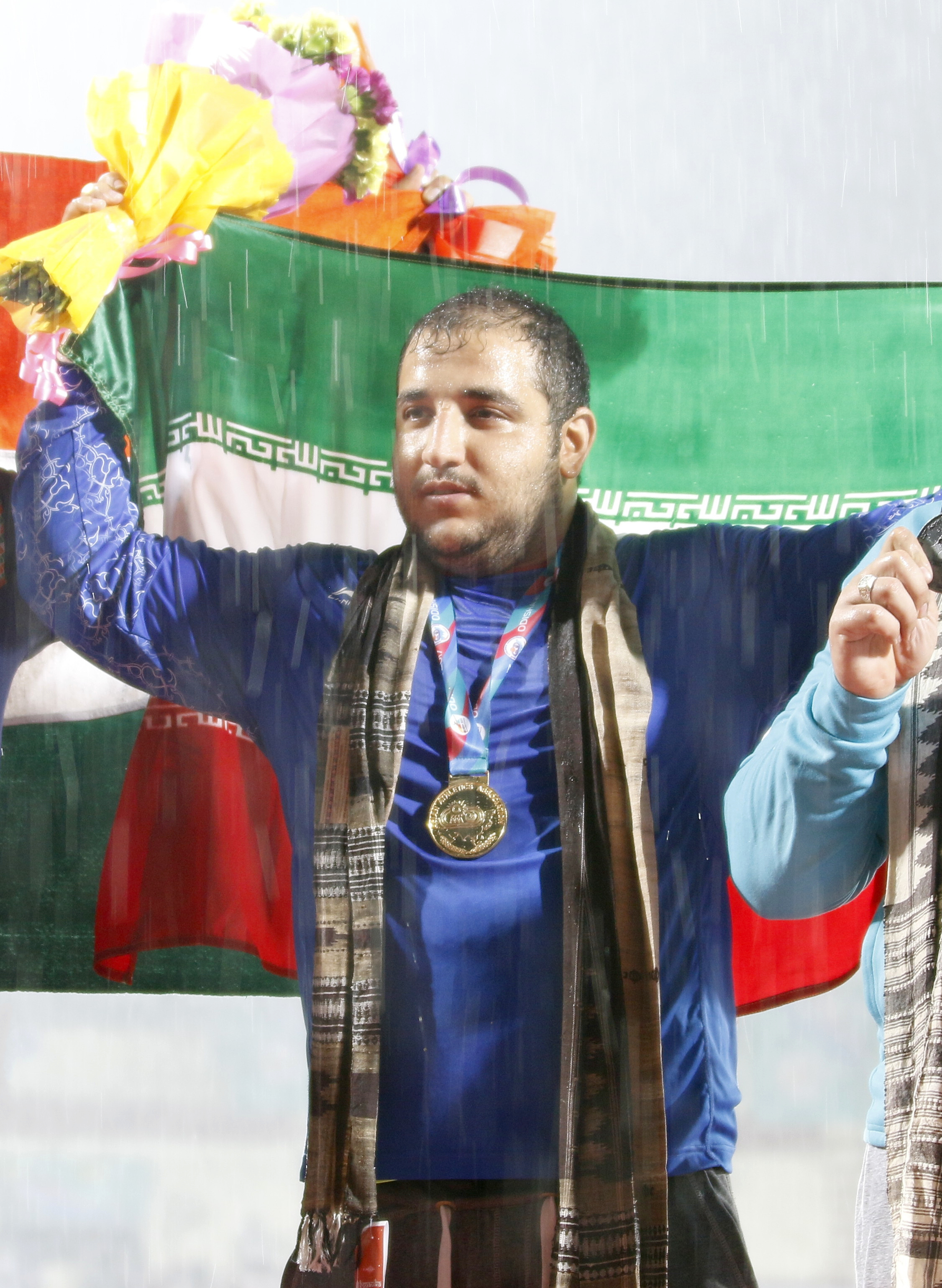
- Samari at the 2017 Asian Championships

Personal information
- Born: 7 January 1993 (age 33) Tehran, Iran
- Education: Payame Noor University
- Height: 1.90 m (6 ft 3 in)
- Weight: 130 kg (287 lb)

Sport
- Sport: Athletics
- Event: Shot put

Achievements and titles
- Personal best: 19.80 m (2017)
Medal record
Men's athletics
Representing Iran
Asian Championships
Gold medal – first place	2017 Bhubaneshwar	Shot put
Asian Indoor Championships
Gold medal – first place	2018 Tehran	Shot put
Asian Beach Games
Gold medal – first place	2016 Danang	Shot put

Ali Samari (Persian: علی ثمری; born 7 January 1993) is an Iranian shot putter.

== International competitions ==
Year	Competition	Venue	Position	Event	Notes
Representing Iran
2016	Asian Indoor Championships	Doha, Qatar	4th	Shot put	17.82 m
2016	Asian Beach Games	Danang, Vietnam	1st	Shot put	18.29 m
2017	Islamic Solidarity Games	Baku, Azerbaijan	4th	Shot put	18.54 m
2017	Asian Championships	Bhubaneswar, India	1st	Shot put	19.80 m
2017	Asian Indoor and Martial Arts Games	Ashgabat, Turkmenistan	9th	Shot put	17.26 m
2018	Asian Indoor Championships	Tehran, Iran	1st	Shot put	19.42 m
2018	Asian Games	Jakarta, Indonesia	7th	Shot put	18.21 m
