= 2003 Asian Athletics Championships – Men's shot put =

The men's shot put event at the 2003 Asian Athletics Championships was held in Manila, Philippines on September 23.

== Results ==
Rank	Name	Nationality	Result	Notes
1st place, gold medalist(s)	Bilal Saad Mubarak	Qatar	19.41	SB
2nd place, silver medalist(s)	Shakti Singh	India	19.04	
3rd place, bronze medalist(s)	Khalid Habash Al-Suwaidi	Qatar	18.57	NJR
4	Sultan Al-Hebshi	Saudi Arabia	18.51	SB
5	Sergey Rubtsov	Kazakhstan	17.92	
6	Kim Jae-Il	South Korea	17.87	
7	Yasutada Noguchi	Japan	17.70	
8	Jaiveer Singh	India	17.49	
9	Dong Enxin	Singapore	17.44	NR
10	Amin Nikfar	Iran	17.37	
11	Sarayudh Pinitjit	Thailand	16.78	
12	Chatchawal Polyemg	Thailand	16.51	
13	Satoshi Hatase	Japan	16.13	
14	Ameen Al-Aradi	Saudi Arabia	15.60	
