= Tajinderpal Singh Toor =

Indian shot putter (born 1994)

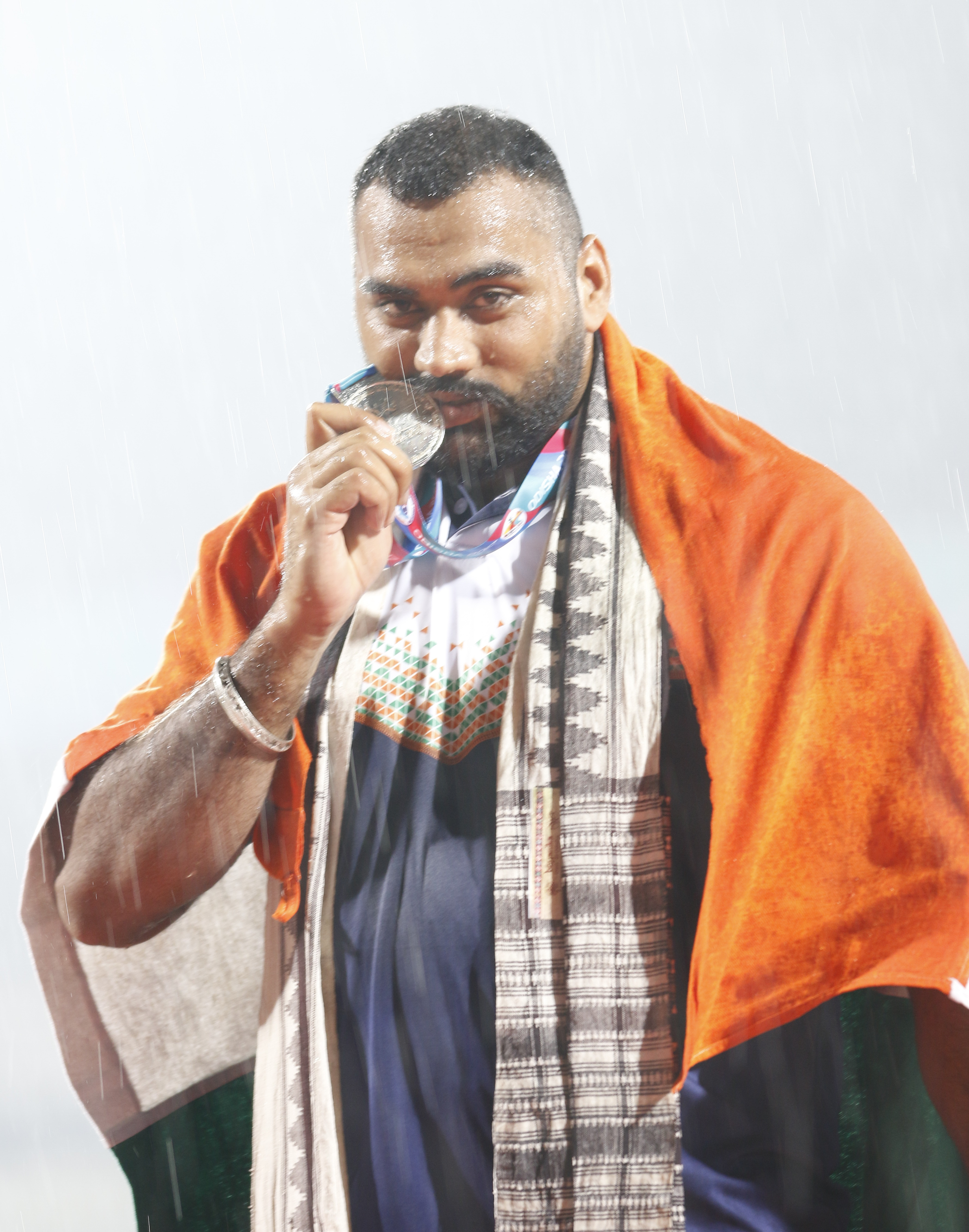
- Toor at the 2017 Asian Championships

Personal information
- Born: 13 November 1994 (age 31) Khosa Pando, Punjab, India
- Height: 1.92 m (6 ft 4 in)
- Military career
- Branch: Indian Navy
- Service years: 2015–2024
- Rank: Chief petty officer

Sport
- Sport: Athletics
- Event: Shot put
- Police career
- Department: Punjab Police
- Service years: 2024–present
- Rank: DSP

Achievements and titles
- Personal bests: 21.77 m NR (2023)
Medal record
Men's athletics
Representing India
Asian Games
Gold medal – first place	2018 Jakarta	Shot put
Gold medal – first place	2022 Hangzhou	Shot put
Silver medal – second place	2026 Aichi–Nagoya	Shot put
Asian Championships
Gold medal – first place	2019 Doha	Shot put
Gold medal – first place	2023 Bangkok	Shot put
Silver medal – second place	2017 Bhubaneshwar	Shot put
Asian Indoor Games
Silver medal – second place	2017 Ashgabat	Shot put
Asian Indoor Championships
Gold medal – first place	2023 Astana	Shot put
Gold medal – first place	2024 Tehran	Shot put
Silver medal – second place	2018 Tehran	Shot put
Silver medal – second place	2026 Tianjin	Shot put
South Asian Games
Gold medal – first place	2019 Kathmandu	Shot put

Tajinderpal Singh Toor (born 13 November 1994) is an Indian shot putter. He is a two-time Asian Games champion, and a two-time champion at both the Asian Championships and the Asian Indoor Championships.

== Early and personal life ==
Toor was born on 13 November 1994 in Khosa Pando village in Moga district, Punjab, India. Hailing from a family of farmers, he switched from cricket to shot put at the insistence of his father. After completing his Bachelor of Physical Education at the Malwa College of Physical Education in Bathinda, he joined the Indian Navy in 2015 under the sports quota and served as a Chief petty officer. In 2024, he was appointed as a Deputy superintendent of police (DSP) in the Punjab Police.

== Career ==
Toor made his international debut at the 2015 Universiade in Gwangju, where he finished fifth with a throw of 19.24 m.

At the 2017 Asian Championships in Bhubaneswar, he won the silver medal with a throw of 19.77 m, missing out on the gold medal by 3 cm. Later at the 2017 Asian Indoor Games in Ashgabat, he won the silver medal with a 19.26 m throw.

He won the silver medal at the 2018 Asian Indoor Championships in Tehran with a throw of 19.18 m. He placed eighth at the 2018 Commonwealth Games in Gold Coast with a 19.42 m throw. At the 2018 Asian Games in Jakarta, he won the gold medal with a best effort of 20.75 m, setting a new Games record.

He won the gold medal at the 2019 Asian Championships in Doha with a 20.22 m throw. At the 2019 World Championships in Doha, he finished 18th among 35 athletes with a 20.43 m throw in the qualification round and did not advance to the final. At the 2019 Military World Games in Wuhan, he placed sixth with a 20.36 m throw. Later at the 2019 South Asian Games in Kathmandu, he won the gold medal with a best effort of 20.03 m, setting a new Games record.

At the 2020 Tokyo Olympics, he recorded a best throw of 19.99 m with his first attempt in the qualification round before fouling his next two attempts. He finished 24th among 31 athletes and failed to advance to the final. Competing with a heavily bandaged shoulder, he later revealed that he had been dealing with an injury, for which he underwent successful surgery after the Games.

At the 2022 World Indoor Championships in Belgrade, he fouled all three of his attempts in the qualification round and finished with no valid mark. Four days before his event at the 2022 World Championships in Eugene, he suffered a groin injury, forcing him to withdraw from the competition. The injury also ruled him out of the 2022 Commonwealth Games.

He won the gold medal at the 2023 Asian Indoor Championships in Astana with a throw of 19.49 m. At the 2023 National Inter-State Championships in Bhubaneswar, he won the gold medal with a throw of 21.77 m, setting a new national and Asian record. He won the gold medal at the 2023 Asian Championships in Bangkok, with a best effort of 20.23 m. Later that year, at the Asian Games in Hangzhou, he successfully defended his title with a throw of 20.36 m.

He won the gold medal at the 2024 Asian Indoor Championships in Tehran with a best effort of 19.72 m. At the 2024 Paris Olympics, he recorded 18.05 m in his first attempt before fouling his next two attempts, finishing 29th among 31 athletes, and failed to advance to the final.

At the 2026 Asian Indoor Championships in Tianjin, he won the silver medal with an indoor national record effort of 20.05 m, missing out on the gold medal by just 2 cm. He placed fifth at the 2026 Commonwealth Games in Glasgow with a 20.27 m throw. He won the silver medal with a 20.64 m throw at the 2026 Asian Games in Nagoya.

== International competitions ==
Representing India
Year	Competition	Host	Position	Result
2015	Universiade	Gwangju, South Korea	5th	19.24 m
2017	Asian Championships	Bhubaneswar, India	2nd	19.77 m
2017	Asian Indoor Games	Ashgabat, Turkmenistan	2nd	19.26 m
2018	Asian Indoor Championships	Tehran, Iran	2nd	19.18 m
2018	Commonwealth Games	Gold Coast, Australia	8th	19.42 m
2018	Asian Games	Jakarta, Indonesia	1st	20.75 m
2019	Asian Championships	Doha, Qatar	1st	20.22 m
2019	World Championships	Doha, Qatar	18th (Q)	20.43 m
2019	Military World Games	Wuhan, China	6th	20.36 m
2019	South Asian Games	Kathmandu, Nepal	1st	20.03 m
2021	Olympic Games	Tokyo, Japan	24th (Q)	19.99 m
2022	World Indoor Championships	Belgrade, Serbia	–	NM
2022	World Championships	Eugene, U.S.	–	NM
2023	Asian Indoor Championships	Astana, Kazakhstan	1st	19.49 m
2023	Asian Championships	Bangkok, Thailand	1st	20.23 m
2023	Asian Games	Hangzhou, China	1st	20.36 m
2024	Asian Indoor Championships	Tehran, Iran	1st	19.72 m
2024	Olympic Games	Paris, France	29th (Q)	18.05 m
2026	Asian Indoor Championships	Tianjin, China	2nd	20.05 m
2026	Commonwealth Games	Glasgow, Scotland	5th	20.27 m
2026	Asian Games	Nagoya, Japan	2nd	20.64 m

== Awards ==
- Arjuna Award, 2019
