= Ahmad Gholoum =

Kuwaiti shot putter (born 1980)

Medal record

Men's athletics

Representing Kuwait

Asian Indoor Championships
Gold medal – first place	2008 Doha	Shot put

Ahmad Abdullah Hassan Gholoum (born 31 May 1980) is a Kuwaiti athlete specialising in the shot put. He won multiple medals on regional level.

His personal bests in the event are 19.18 metres outdoors (Amman 2007) and 19.08 metres indoors (Hangzhou 2012). The latter is the standing national record.

== Competition record ==
Year	Competition	Venue	Position	Event	Notes
Representing Kuwait
2012	World Junior Championships	Annecy, France	19th (q)	Shot put	15.76 m
2012	Arab Junior Championships	Damascus, Syria	1st	Shot put	16.25 m
1999	Asian Junior Championships	Singapore	1st	Shot put	17.87 m
1999	Arab Championships	Beirut, Lebanon	3rd	Shot put	17.91 m
2000	Asian Championships	Jakarta, Indonesia	5th	Shot put	17.81 m
2001	Arab Championships	Damascus, Syria	2nd	Shot put	18.92 m
2002	West Asian Games	Kuwait City, Kuwait	2nd	Shot put	18.04 m
2002	Asian Championships	Colombo, Sri Lanka	6th	Shot put	17.37 m
2002	Asian Games	Busan, South Korea	4th	Shot put	18.27 m
2004	Pan Arab Games	Algiers, Algeria	3rd	Shot put	18.20 m
2005	Islamic Solidarity Games	Mecca, Saudi Arabia	7th	Shot put	17.22 m
2005	Asian Championships	Incheon, South Korea	6th	Shot put	17.92 m
2005	Arab Championships	Radès, Tunisia	3rd	Shot put	17.77 m
2006	Asian Games	Doha, Qatar	6th	Shot put	18.26 m
2007	Arab Championships	Amman, Jordan	1st	Shot put	19.18 m
2007	Asian Championships	Amman, Jordan	5th	Shot put	18.17 m
2007	Asian Indoor Games	Macau, China	2nd	Shot put	18.88 m
2007	Pan Arab Games	Cairo, Egypt	5th	Shot put	18.71 m
2008	Asian Indoor Championships	Doha, Qatar	1st	Shot put	18.55 m
2011	Arab Championships	Al Ain, United Arab Emirates	2nd	Shot put	18.67 m
2011	Pan Arab Games	Doha, Qatar	2nd	Shot put	18.74 m
2012	Asian Indoor Championships	Hangzhou, China	4th	Shot put	19.08 m
2012	West Asian Championships	Dubai, United Arab Emirates	1st	Shot put	18.97 m
2014	Asian Games	Incheon, South Korea	5th	Shot put	18.71 m
2015	Arab Championships	Isa Town, Bahrain	3rd	Shot put	18.08 m
