= Navpreet Singh =

Indian shot putter (born 1979)

Medal record

Men's athletics

Representing India

Asian Championships
Gold medal – first place	2007 Amman	Shot put
Silver medal – second place	2002 Colombo	Shot put
Silver medal – second place	2005 Incheon	Shot put

Navpreet Singh Cheema (born 15 June 1979) is an Indian shot putter. His personal best throw is 19.93 metres, achieved in July 2004 in Chennai.

== Competition record ==
Year	Competition	Venue	Position	Event	Notes
Representing India
1997	Asian Junior Championships	Bangkok, Thailand	2nd	Shot put	16.16 m
1998	World Junior Championships	Annecy, France	23rd (q)	Shot put	15.25 m
2002	Commonwealth Games	Manchester, United Kingdom	–	Shot put	NM
2002	Asian Championships	Colombo, Sri Lanka	2nd	Shot put	18.97 m
2003	Afro-Asian Games	Hyderabad, India	3rd	Shot put	18.81 m
2005	Asian Championships	Incheon, South Korea	2nd	Shot put	19.40 m
2005	Asian Indoor Games	Bangkok, Thailand	1st	Shot put	18.80 m
2006	World Cup	Athens, Greece	7th	Shot put	18.43 m
2006	Asian Games	Doha, Qatar	4th	Shot put	18.99 m
2007	Asian Championships	Amman, Jordan	1st	Shot put	19.70 m
2007	World Championships	Osaka, Japan	20th (q)	Shot put	19.35 m
