= Chang Ming-huang =

Taiwanese athlete (born 1982)

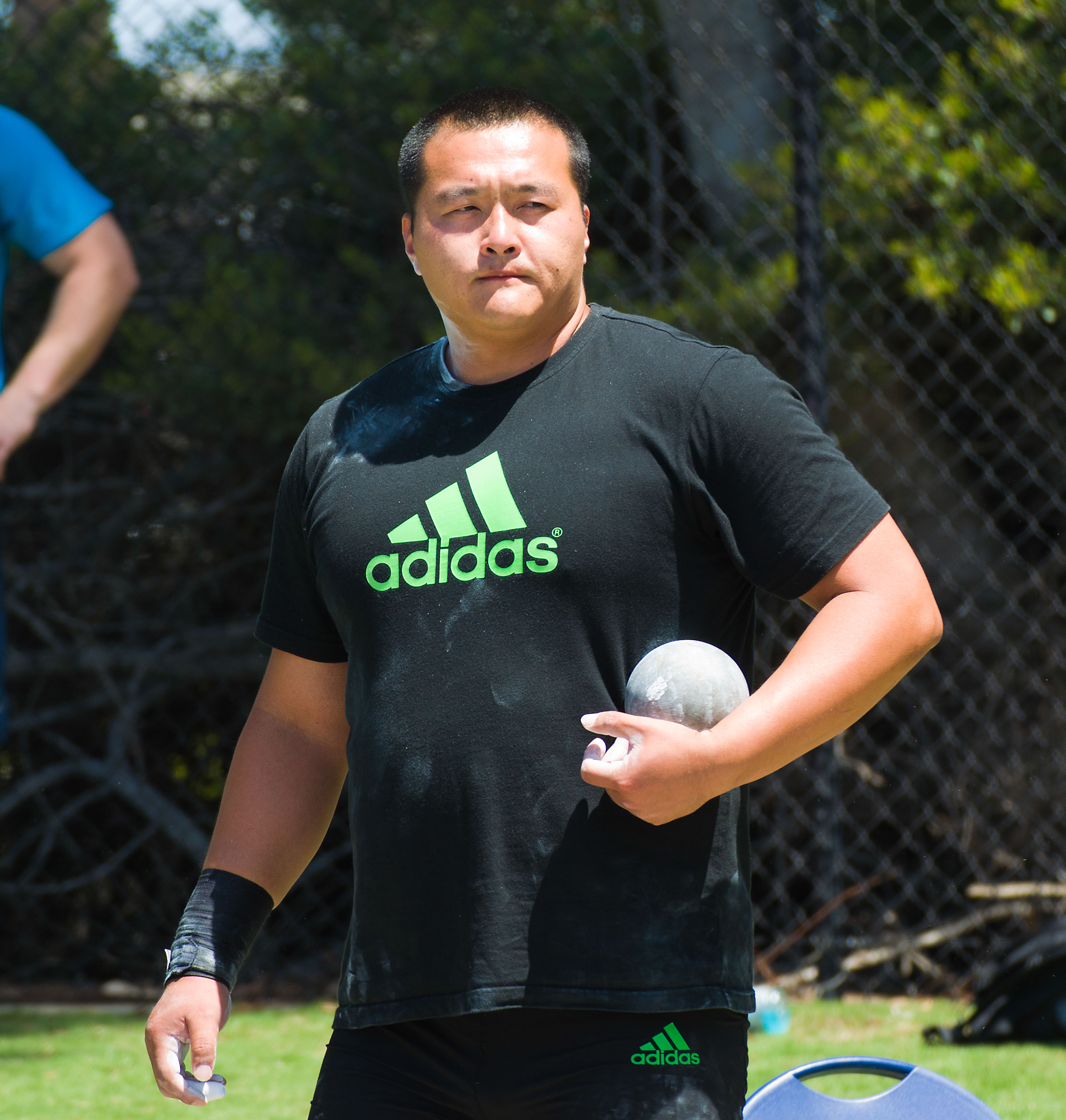
- Chang Ming-Huang in 2012

Personal information
- Nationality: Republic of China
- Born: 7 August 1982 (age 43) Taichung, Taiwan
- Height: 1.93 m (6 ft 4 in)
- Weight: 140 kg (309 lb)

Sport
- Country: Chinese Taipei
- Sport: Athletics
- Event: Shot put
Medal record
Men's athletics
Representing Chinese Taipei
Asian Championships
Silver medal – second place	2007 Amman	Shot put

Chang Ming-huang (Chinese: 張銘煌; pinyin: Zhāng Mínghuáng; born 7 August 1982 in Taichung) is a Taiwanese discus thrower and shot putter.

He has been focusing on shot put only since 2006. He trained in National College of Physical Education during his university study in Taiwan. He also has trained in China for a period. He has trained with Werner Goldmann in Berlin from June 2007 until 2008 Olympic Games in Beijing.

He has been training with Donald Babbitt in Athens, GA, USA, since Feb 2010. His personal best shot-put throw is 20.58 metres, achieved in Aug 2011 in Athens, Georgia, USA. This is the national record in Taiwan. This performance qualified him for the 2012 London Olympic Games (standard A).

On 3 August 2012, Ming-Huang threw 20.25 meters in the qualification round of the Men's Shot-Put at the London Olympic Games and became the 2nd Asian athlete to get into the final in the history of the event. Later in the evening, he threw 19.99 meters and was ranked 12th in the final.

Ming-Huang is sponsored by Chinese Taipei Athletics Association (CTAA) & Taiwan Sport Administration of Ministry of Education and Adidas. CTAA represents Ming-Huang Chang for all foreign affairs.

Ming-Huang is also employed by National Taiwan University of Physical Education and Sport as a throwing coach.

== Achievements ==
Year	Competition	Venue	Position	Event	Notes
Representing Chinese Taipei
1999	World Youth Championships	Bydgoszcz, Poland	1st	Discus (1.5 kg)	64.14 m
1999	Asian Junior Championships	Singapore	11th	Shot put	13.83 m
1999	Asian Junior Championships	Singapore	5th	Discus	49.70 m
2000	World Junior Championships	Santiago, Chile	23rd (q)	Discus	48.07 m
2001	East Asian Games	Osaka, Japan	2nd	Discus	55.88 m
2001	Asian Junior Championships	Bandar Seri Begawan, Brunei	3rd	Shot put	17.20 m
2001	Asian Junior Championships	Bandar Seri Begawan, Brunei	4th	Discus	49.46 m
2001	Universiade	Beijing, China	–	Shot put	NM
2001	Universiade	Beijing, China	17th (q)	Discus	51.14 m
2002	Asian Championships	Colombo, Sri Lanka	11th	Shot put	15.70 m
2002	Asian Championships	Colombo, Sri Lanka	6th	Discus	52.94 m
2004	Asian Indoor Championships	Tehran, Iran	6th	Shot put	17.49 m
2005	Asian Championships	Incheon, South Korea	10th	Discus	52.75 m
2006	Asian Games	Doha, Qatar	3rd	Shot put	19.45 m
2007	Asian Championships	Amman, Jordan	2nd	Shot put	19.66 m
2007	Universiade	Bangkok, Thailand	3rd	Shot put	19.36 m
2007	World Championships	Osaka, Japan	30th (q)	Shot put	18.53 m
2007	Asian Indoor Games	Macau	4th	Shot put	17.93 m
2008	World Indoor Championships	Valencia, Spain	20th (q)	Shot put	17.73 m
2008	Olympic Games	Beijing, China	40th (q)	Shot put	17.43 m
2009	Universiade	Belgrade, Serbia	8th	Shot put	18.42 m
2009	Asian Indoor Games	Hanoi, Vietnam	2nd	Shot put	19.55 m
2009	Asian Championships	Guangzhou, China	2nd	Shot put	19.34 m
2009	East Asian Games	Hong Kong	2nd	Shot put	18.33 m
2009	East Asian Games	Hong Kong	3rd	Discus	54.92 m
2010	Asian Games	Guangzhou, China	3rd	Shot put	19.48 m
2011	Asian Championships	Kobe, Japan	1st	Shot put	20.14 m
2011	World Championships	Daegu, South Korea	18th (q)	Shot put	19.60 m
2012	World Indoor Championships	Istanbul, Turkey	21st (q)	Shot put	18.75 m
2012	Olympic Games	London, United Kingdom	12th	Shot put	19.99 m
2013	Asian Championships	Pune, India	2nd	Shot put	19.61 m
2013	East Asian Games	Tianjin, China	3rd	Shot put	19.19 m
2014	Asian Games	Incheon, South Korea	2nd	Shot put	19.97 m
2018	Asian Games	Jakarta, Indonesia	5th	Shot put	18.98 m
