= Zhang Qi (shot putter) =

Chinese shot putter

Medal record

Men's athletics

Representing China

Asian Championships
| Bronze medal – third place | 2005 Incheon | Shot put |

Zhang Qi (Chinese: 张奇; pinyin: Zhāng Qí; born 24 December 1984) is a Chinese shot putter. His personal best throw is 20.15 metres, achieved in October 2005 in Nanjing.

He won the bronze medal at the 2005 Asian Athletics Championships and finished fifth at the 2006 Asian Games. He also competed at the 2006 IAAF World Indoor Championships without reaching the final.

In 2008, he was found guilty of using a banned anabolic agent and banned for four years by the Chinese athletics governing body.
