= Sultan Al-Hebshi =

Saudi Arabian shot putter

Sultan Abdulmajeed Al-Hebshi (Arabic: سلطان الحبشي; born 31 January 1985 or 23 February 1983) is a Saudi Arabian shot putter.

His personal best was set at the 2009 Doha meeting, throwing a new area record of 21.13 m and finishing in third, only behind Olympic champion Tomasz Majewski and World Champion Reese Hoffa.

== Competition record ==
Year	Competition	Venue	Position	Event	Notes
Representing Saudi Arabia
2001	World Youth Championships	Debrecen, Hungary	12th	Shot put (5 kg)	17.74 m
2002	World Junior Championships	Kingston, Jamaica	25th (q)	Shot put (6 kg)	16.99 m
2002	Asian Games	Busan, South Korea	6th	Shot put	17.05 m
2003	Asian Championships	Manila, Philippines	4th	Shot put	18.51 m
2005	Islamic Solidarity Games	Mecca, Saudi Arabia	1st	Shot put	18.97 m
2005	Asian Championships	Incheon, South Korea	5th	Shot put	18.62 m
2006	Asian Games	Doha, Qatar	1st	Shot put	20.42 m
2007	World Championships	Osaka, Japan	22nd (q)	Shot put	19.20 m
2007	Asian Indoor Games	Macau	1st	Shot put	18.99 m
2007	Pan Arab Games	Cairo, Egypt	2nd	Shot put	19.53 m
2008	Olympic Games	Beijing, China	27th (q)	Shot put	19.51 m
2009	World Championships	Berlin, Germany	12th (q)	Shot put	20.04 m
2009	Asian Indoor Games	Hanoi, Vietnam	3rd	Shot put	19.39 m
2009	Asian Championships	Guangzhou, China	5th	Shot put	18.89 m
2010	World Indoor Championships	Doha, Qatar	17th (q)	Shot put	18.67 m
2010	West Asian Championships	Aleppo, Syria	2nd	Shot put	18.54 m
2010	Asian Games	Guangzhou, China	1st	Shot put	20.57 m
2013	Asian Championships	Pune, India	1st	Shot put	19.68 m
2013	World Championships	Moscow, Russia	18th (q)	Shot put	19.22 m
2013	Islamic Solidarity Games	Palembang, Indonesia	1st	Shot put	18.65 m
2014	Asian Games	Incheon, South Korea	1st	Shot put	19.99 m
2017	Islamic Solidarity Games	Baku, Azerbaijan	2nd	Shot put	19.56 m
2017	Asian Championships	Bhubaneswar, India	9th	Shot put	17.62 m
2017	Asian Indoor and Martial Arts Games	Ashgabat, Turkmenistan	8th	Shot put	18.16 m
2018	Asian Games	Jakarta, Indonesia	–	Shot put	NM
