= Shakti Singh (athlete) =

Indian athlete

Personal information
- Born: 14 May 1962 (age 64)

Sport
- Sport: Track and field
Medal record
Representing India
Asian Games
Silver medal – second place	1998 Bangkok	Shot put
Bronze medal – third place	2002 Busan	Shot put
Asian Championships
Gold medal – first place	2000 Jakarta	Shot put
Silver medal – second place	1991 Kuala Lumpur	Discus throw
Silver medal – second place	2003 Manila	Shot put
Bronze medal – third place	1989 New Delhi	Discus throw
Bronze medal – third place	1995 Jakarta	Shot put
Bronze medal – third place	1998 Fukuoka	Shot put

Shakti Singh (born 14 May 1962) is an Indian discus thrower and shot putter.

His personal best shot put is 20.60 meters, achieved in July 2000 in Bangalore. His personal best discus throw is 61.72 meters, achieved in June 1994 in Bangalore.

== Competition record ==
Year	Competition	Venue	Position	Event	Notes
Representing India
1985	Universiade	Kobe, Japan	12th	Discus throw	49.12 m
1989	Asian Championships	New Delhi, India	3rd	Discus throw	55.60 m
1991	Asian Championships	Kuala Lumpur, Malaysia	2nd	Discus throw	53.26 m
1993	World Championships	Stuttgart, Germany	27th (q)	Discus throw	48.78 m
1995	Asian Championships	Djakarta, Indonesia	3rd	Shot put	18.07 m
1996	Olympic Games	Atlanta, United States	30th (q)	Discus throw	56.58 m
1997	World Championships	Athens, Greece	36th (q)	Discus throw	56.28 m
1998	Asian Championships	Fukuoka, Japan	3rd	Shot put	18.40 m
1998	Asian Games	Bangkok, Thailand	2nd	Shot put	18.81 m
1999	World Championships	Seville, Spain	25th (q)	Shot put	18.58 m
2000	Asian Championships	Djakarta, Indonesia	1st	Shot put	19.77 m (CR)
2000	Olympic Games	Sydney, Australia	32nd (q)	Shot put	18.40 m
2002	Asian Games	Busan, South Korea	3rd	Shot put	18.27 m
2003	Asian Championships	Manila, Philippines	2nd	Shot put	19.04 m
2003	Afro-Asian Games	Hyderabad, India	1st	Shot put	19.05 m
2005	Asian Championships	Incheon, South Korea	7th	Shot put	17.88 m
