= Khalid Habash Al-Suwaidi =

Qatari shot putter and discus thrower

Medal record

Men's athletics

Representing Qatar

Asian Championships
Gold medal – first place	2005 Incheon	Shot put
Bronze medal – third place	2003 Manila	Shot put
Bronze medal – third place	2007 Amman	Shot put

Khalid Habash Al-Suwaidi (born 10 October 1984 in Qatar) is a male shot putter from Qatar.

== Biography ==
His personal best throw is 20.54 metres, achieved in June 2005 in Minsk. This is the Qatari record.

== Achievements ==
Year	Competition	Venue	Position	Event	Notes
Representing Qatar
1999	World Youth Championships	Bydgoszcz, Poland	3rd	Shot put (5 kg)	19.44 m
1999	World Youth Championships	Bydgoszcz, Poland	8th	Discus throw (1.5 kg)	54.35 m
1999	Asian Junior Championships	Singapore	8th	Shot put	15.73 m
2000	Asian Championships	Jakarta, Indonesia	11th	Shot put	15.67 m
2000	Asian Championships	Jakarta, Indonesia	13th	Discus throw	47.18 m
2000	World Junior Championships	Santiago, Chile	—	Shot put	NM
2001	World Youth Championships	Debrecen, Hungary	4th	Shot put (5 kg)	19.43 m
2001	World Youth Championships	Debrecen, Hungary	1st	Discus throw (1.5 kg)	62.67 m
2001	Asian Junior Championships	Bandar Seri Begawan, Brunei	4th	Shot put	16.96 m
2001	Asian Junior Championships	Bandar Seri Begawan, Brunei	3rd	Discus throw	55.28 m
2002	World Junior Championships	Kingston, Jamaica	10th	Shot put (6 kg)	18.66 m
2002	World Junior Championships	Kingston, Jamaica	4th	Discus throw (1.75 kg)	61.21 m
2002	Asian Championships	Colombo, Sri Lanka	4th	Discus throw	57.74 m
2002	Asian Junior Championships	Bangkok, Thailand	1st	Shot put (6 kg)	20.29 m
2002	Asian Junior Championships	Bangkok, Thailand	1st	Discus throw (1.75 kg)	63.17 m
2003	Asian Championships	Manila, Philippines	2nd	Shot put	18.57 m
2003	Asian Championships	Manila, Philippines	5th	Discus throw	58.20 m
2004	World Indoor Championships	Budapest, Hungary	13th (q)	Shot put	19.82 m
2005	World Championships	Helsinki, Finland	12th (q)	Shot put	19.72 m
2005	Asian Championships	Incheon, South Korea	1st	Shot put	19.45 m
2006	Asian Games	Doha, Qatar	2nd	Shot put	20.05 m
2007	Asian Championships	Amman, Jordan	3rd	Shot put	19.51 m
2007	World Championships	Osaka, Japan	25th (q)	Shot put	19.09 m
2007	Pan Arab Games	Cairo, Egypt	1st	Shot put	19.56 m
2010	Asian Games	Guangzhou, China	7th	Shot put	18.02 m
2011	Pan Arab Games	Doha, Qatar	3rd	Shot put	17.79 m
