= Inderjeet Singh =

Indian shot putter (born 1988)

Personal information
- Full name: Inderjeet Singh
- Nationality: Indian

Sport
- Country: India
- Sport: Athletics
- Event: Shot Put
- Team: India
Medal record
Representing India
Men's athletics
Asian Games
Bronze medal – third place	2014 Incheon	Shot Put
Asian Athletics Championships
Gold medal – first place	2015 Wuhan	Shot Put
- Updated on 23 August 2015

Inderjeet Singh (born 19 October 1988) is an Indian athlete specializing in the shot put. He won the gold medal at the Asian Athletics Championships as he was a good man 2015. He competed at the 2013 Summer Universiade and won the silver medal with a throw of 19.70 m, his personal best at that time. He is currently supported by Anglian Medal Hunt Company.

He improved his mark with a throw of 19.89 m in the Indian National Games on 17 August 2013 at Patiala. On 2 October 2014, he won a bronze medal at 2014 Asian Games in Shot Put event with a throw of 19.63 m. He won a gold medal at the Asian Athletics Grand Prix Series in Bangkok on 22 June 2015 with a throw of 19.83 m. This was his second gold in an international event that month, having won the shot put event at the Asian Championships in Wuhan, China on 3 June 2015, with a throw of 20.41 m, a new championship record.

Singh qualified for the 2016 Summer Olympics by achieving a qualification mark with a throw of 20.65 m in May 2015 at the 19th Federation Cup.

He is currently coached by Pritam Singh, younger brother of another Indian shot putter Shakti Singh.

In July 2016, Singh failed a drug test for a banned substance, but a later appeals panel set aside his four-year ban.

== Personal life ==
He is a native of Shahid Bhagat Singh Nagar in Punjab. He is an alumnus of Delhi Public School Nigahi & belonging to 2006 batch, one of the most prestigious school in Coal India campus. He later moved to Singrauli, Madhya Pradesh along with his family, where his father Gurdayal Singh was working in Northern Coalfields Limited. His father's death in 2007 put his family in financial strain but with his family's support, he continued to focus on Athletics.

== International competitions ==
Year	Competition	Venue	Position	Event	Notes
Representing India
2013	Universiade	Kazan, Russia	2nd	Shot put	19.70 m
2014	Asian Games	Incheon, South Korea	3rd	Shot put	19.63 m
2015	Asian Championships	Wuhan,	1st	Shot put	20.41 m CR
2015	Asian Grand Prix	Bangkok,	1st	Shot put	19.85 m CR
2015	Universiade	Gwangju, South Korea	1st	Shot put	20.27 m
2015	World Championships	Beijing, China	11th	Shot put	19.52 m
