= Om Prakash Karhana =

Indian shot putter (born 1987)

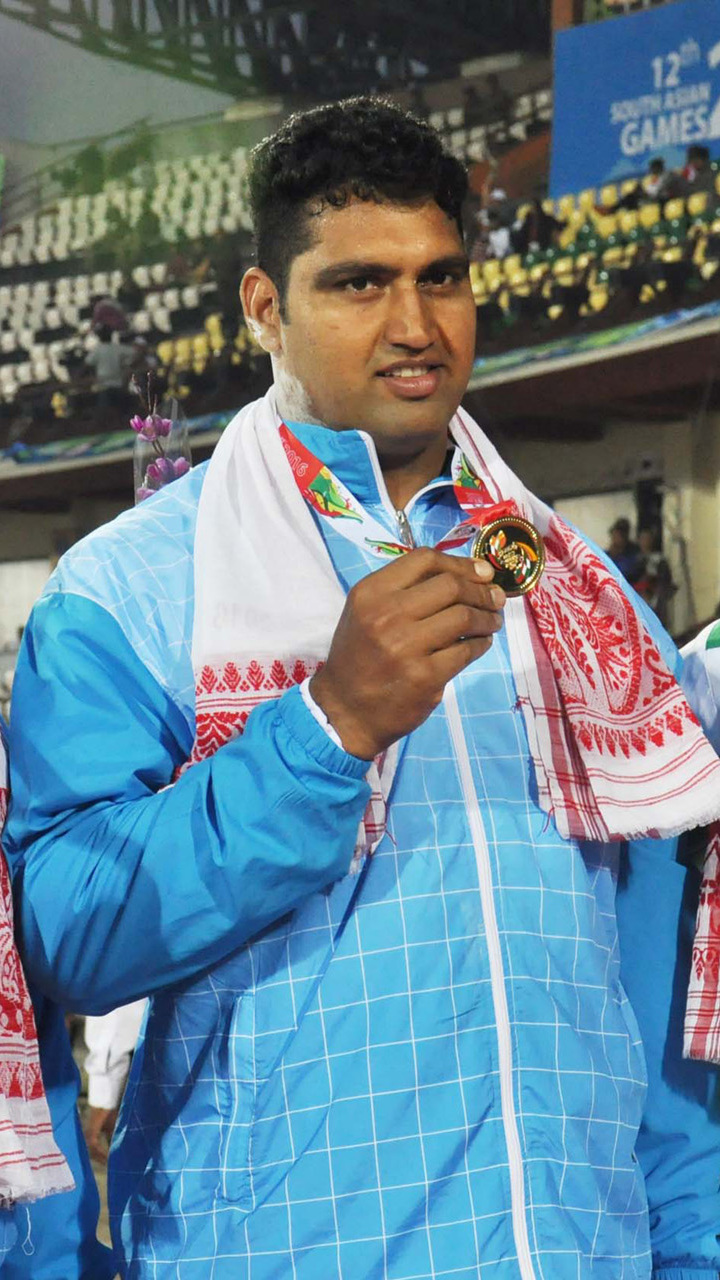

Personal information
- Full name: Om Prakash Singh Karhana
- Nickname: OP
- Nationality: Indian
- Born: Om Prakash Karhana; 11 January 1987 (age 39) Lakhuwas (near Gurugram, Haryana)
- Height: 6 ft 7 in (2.01 m)
- Weight: 138 kg (304 lb)

Sport
- Country: India
- Sport: Shot put
- Event: Track and field

Achievements and titles
- Personal best: 20.69m (2012)
Medal record
Men's athletics
Representing India
Asian Championships
Gold medal – first place	2009 Guangzhou	Shot put
Bronze medal – third place	2011 Kobe	Shot put
Asian Indoor Championships
Gold medal – first place	2014 Hangzhou	Shot put
Silver medal – second place	2008 Doha	Shot put
Bronze medal – third place	2016 Doha	Shot put
South Asian Games
Gold medal – first place	2016 Guwahati	Shot put
Silver medal – second place	2019 Kathmandu	Shot put

Om Prakash Singh Karhana (born 11 January 1987) is an Indian shot putter. He trains at the Salwan Throws Academy, where he first began to learn how to shot put, and is supported by Olympic Gold Quest, a not-for-profit foundation to identify and support Indian athletes. He was originally a basketball player, but was approached by Lalit Bhanot, secretary of the Athletics Federation of India, to consider switching to the shot put.

Om Prakash Karhana holds the Indian national record in shot put at 20.69 meters which he achieved in May 2012 at Szombathely, Hungary and he qualified for and competed at the 2012 London Olympics. At the 2014 Commonwealth Games, he reached the final, finishing in 6th place.
