= 1997 World Championships in Athletics – Men's shot put =

These are the official results of the Men's Shot Put event at the 1997 IAAF World Championships in Athens, Greece. The original winner, Oleksandr Bagach, was later disqualified for Doping.

== Medalists ==
| Gold | John Godina; United States (USA) |
| Silver | Oliver-Sven Buder; Germany (GER) |
| Bronze | C.J. Hunter; United States (USA) |

== Results ==
=== Qualification ===
Qualification: Qualifying Performance 19.80 (Q) or at least 12 best performers (q) advance to the final.

| Rank | Group | Athlete | Nationality | #1 | #2 | #3 | Result | Notes |
|---|---|---|---|---|---|---|---|---|
| 1 | A | John Godina | United States | 21.10 | | | 21.10 | Q |
| 2 | B | Oliver-Sven Buder | Germany | 20.53 | | | 20.53 | Q |
| 3 | B | Yuriy Belonog | Ukraine | 19.75 | 20.31 | | 20.31 | Q |
| 4 | B | Roman Virastyuk | Ukraine | 20.13 | | | 20.13 | Q |
| 5 | A | Mika Halvari | Finland | 20.10 | | | 20.10 | Q |
| 6 | B | C.J. Hunter | United States | 19.48 | 19.68 | 20.05 | 20.05 | Q |
| 7 | B | Kevin Toth | United States | x | x | 19.99 | 19.99 | Q |
| 8 | B | Paolo Dal Soglio | Italy | 18.83 | 19.93 | | 19.93 | Q |
| 9 | A | Burger Lambrechts | South Africa | x | 19.36 | 19.91 | 19.91 | Q, PB |
| 10 | A | Michael Mertens | Germany | 19.88 | | | 19.88 | Q |
| 11 | B | Saulius Kleiza | Lithuania | 19.71 | x | 18.99 | 19.71 | |
| 12 | B | Manuel Martínez | Spain | 19.61 | 19.23 | x | 19.61 | |
| 13 | A | Randy Barnes | United States | 19.23 | 19.51 | x | 19.51 | |
| 14 | A | Arsi Harju | Finland | x | x | 19.43 | 19.43 | |
| 15 | A | Corrado Fantini | Italy | 19.30 | 18.74 | x | 19.43 | |
| 16 | A | Miroslav Menc | Czech Republic | 19.07 | 19.23 | x | 19.23 | |
| 17 | B | Bilal Saad Mubarak | Qatar | 18.09 | 18.90 | 19.08 | 19.08 | |
| 18 | B | Dragan Perić | Yugoslavia | 18.86 | 19.05 | 18.93 | 19.05 | |
| 19 | B | Stevimir Ercegovac | Croatia | 19.00 | | | 19.00 | |
| 20 | A | Bradley Snyder | Canada | 17.76 | 18.52 | 18.94 | 18.94 | |
| 21 | B | Yoger Medina | Venezuela | 18.36 | 18.31 | 18.92 | 18.92 | |
| 22 | A | Viktor Bulat | Belarus | 17.97 | 18.61 | x | 18.61 | |
| 23 | B | Dmitriy Goncharuk | Belarus | 18.33 | 18.60 | x | 18.60 | |
| 24 | A | Kjell Ove Hauge | Norway | 18.12 | x | 18.37 | 18.37 | |
| 25 | A | Sergey Rubtsov | Kazakhstan | 18.16 | x | x | 18.16 | |
| 26 | B | Shaun Pickering | Great Britain | 18.10 | 17.84 | 17.42 | 18.10 | |
| 27 | B | Vyacheslav Lykho | Russia | 17.77 | 17.67 | 18.04 | 18.04 | |
| 28 | A | Chima Ugwu | Nigeria | 17.25 | 17.84 | 18.00 | 18.00 | |
| 29 | A | Mark Proctor | Great Britain | 17.99 | x | x | 17.99 | |
| 30 | A | Milan Haborák | Slovakia | 17.85 | x | x | 17.85 | |
| 31 | A | Alexios Leonidis | Greece | 17.77 | | | 17.77 | |
| 32 | B | Faaea Talalemotu | Northern Mariana Islands | 13.96 | 13.11 | 12.92 | 13.96 | |
| | A | Oleksandr Bagach | Ukraine | | | | DQ | |
| | B | Tarek Al Najjar | Jordan | | | | DNS | |

=== Final ===
| Rank | Athlete | Nationality | #1 | #2 | #3 | #4 | #5 | #6 | Result | Notes |
|---|---|---|---|---|---|---|---|---|---|---|
| 1st place, gold medalist(s) | John Godina | United States | 21.24 | 21.39 | 21.44 | 21.19 | 21.20 | x | 21.44 | |
| 2nd place, silver medalist(s) | Oliver-Sven Buder | Germany | 20.79 | 20.18 | 20.41 | 21.05 | x | 21.24 | 21.24 | |
| 3rd place, bronze medalist(s) | C.J. Hunter | United States | 20.22 | 20.30 | x | x | x | 20.33 | 20.33 | |
| 4 | Yuriy Belonog | Ukraine | x | 20.22 | x | 20.26 | x | x | 20.26 | |
| 5 | Mika Halvari | Finland | x | 20.13 | x | x | x | x | 20.13 | |
| 6 | Roman Virastyuk | Ukraine | 20.00 | 20.01 | 20.12 | x | x | x | 20.12 | |
| 7 | Kevin Toth | United States | 19.50 | 20.02 | x | x | x | x | 20.02 | |
| 8 | Michael Mertens | Germany | 19.82 | 19.91 | 19.86 | x | x | x | 19.91 | |
| 9 | Paolo Dal Soglio | Italy | 19.77 | x | x | | | | 19.77 | |
| 10 | Burger Lambrechts | South Africa | x | 19.39 | x | | | | 19.39 | |
| 11 | Saulius Kleiza | Lithuania | 18.25 | x | x | | | | 18.25 | |
| | Oleksandr Bagach | Ukraine | | | | | | | DQ | |
