= Athletics at the 2000 Summer Olympics – Men's shot put =

Men's shot put at the Games of the XXVII Olympiad
- Pictogram for athletics
- Venue: ANZ Stadium
- Date: 22 September 2000 (qualification and finals)
- Competitors: 37 from 27 nations
- Winning distance: 21.29

Medalists
1st place, gold medalist(s)		Arsi Harju; Finland
2nd place, silver medalist(s)		Adam Nelson; United States
3rd place, bronze medalist(s)		John Godina; United States

The men's shot put event at the 2000 Summer Olympics as part of the athletics program was held at the Olympic Stadium on Friday, 22 September. The shot put has been ever present since the beginning of the modern Olympic Games in 1896. Thirty-seven athletes from 27 nations competed. The maximum number of athletes per nation had been set at 3 since the 1930 Olympic Congress. The qualifying athletes progressed through to the final where the qualifying distances were scrapped and they started afresh with up to six throws. The event was won by Arsi Harju of Finland, the nation's first victory in the men's shot put since 1920 (and second overall) and first medal in the event since 1936. Americans Adam Nelson and John Godina took silver and bronze, respectively, with Godina becoming the 12th man to earn multiple shot put medals (adding to his 1996 silver).

== Background ==
This was the 24th appearance of the event, which is one of 12 athletics events to have been held at every Summer Olympics. The returning finalists from the 1996 Games were silver medalist John Godina of the United States, fourth-place finisher Paolo Dal Soglio of Italy, fifth-place finisher Oliver-Sven Buder of Germany, sixth-place finisher Roman Virastyuk of Ukraine, eighth-place finisher (and 1992 finalist) Dragan Perić of Yugoslavia, and tenth-place finisher Bilal Saad Mubarak of Qatar. Godina, the 1995 and 1997 world champion, had finished fourth in the U.S. trials and was able to compete only as a replacement for C.J. Hunter (reigning world champion and 1996 Olympic seventh-place finisher), who was disqualified before competing.

Croatia, Cuba, Moldova, and Slovakia each made their debut in the men's shot put. The United States made its 23rd appearance, most of any nation, having missed only the boycotted 1980 Games.

== Qualification ==
Each National Olympic Committee was permitted to enter up to three athletes that had thrown 19.70 metres or further during the qualification period. The maximum number of athletes per nation had been set at 3 since the 1930 Olympic Congress. If an NOC had no athletes that qualified under that standard, one athlete that had thrown 19.30 metres or further could be entered.

== Competition format ==
The competition used the two-round format introduced in 1936, with the qualifying round completely separate from the divided final. In qualifying, each athlete received three attempts; those recording a mark of at least 20.10 metres advanced to the final. If fewer than 12 athletes achieved that distance, the top 12 would advance. The results of the qualifying round were then ignored. Finalists received three throws each, with the top eight competitors receiving an additional three attempts. The best distance among those six throws counted.

== Records ==
These were the standing world and Olympic records (in meters) prior to the 2000 Summer Olympics.

World record	Randy Barnes (USA)	23.12	Los Angeles, United States	20 May 1990
Olympic record	Ulf Timmermann (GDR)	22.47	Seoul, South Korea	23 September 1988

No new world or Olympic records were set during the competition. The following national records were set during the competition:

Nation	Athlete	Round	Distance
Spain	Manuel Martínez Gutiérrez	Final	20.55

== Schedule ==
All times are Australian Eastern Standard Time (UTC+10)

Date	Time	Round
Friday, 22 September 2000	10:00; 18:45	Qualifying; Final

== Results ==
=== Qualifying ===
The qualifying round was held on Friday, 22 September 2000. The qualifying distance was 20.10 m. For all qualifiers who did not achieve the standard, the remaining spaces in the final were filled by the longest throws until a total of 12 qualifiers.

Rank	Athlete	Nation	Group	1	2	3	Distance	Notes
1	Arsi Harju	Finland	B	19.40	21.39	—	21.39	Q, PB
2	John Godina	United States	A	20.58	–	—	20.58	Q
3	Yuriy Bilonog	Ukraine	B	20.53	–	—	20.53	Q
4	Adam Nelson	United States	A	20.12	–	—	20.12	Q
5	Timo Aaltonen	Finland	A	20.04	X	19.82	20.04	q
6	Milan Haborak	Slovakia	B	20.00	X	X	20.00	q
7	Andrei Mikhnevich	Belarus	A	X	X	19.97	19.97	q
8	Oliver-Sven Buder	Germany	A	19.96	X	19.80	19.96	q
9	Manuel Martínez Gutiérrez	Spain	A	19.94	18.95	19.86	19.94	q
10	Miroslav Menc	Czech Republic	B	19.68	19.18	19.92	19.92	q
11	Andrew Bloom	United States	B	X	19.65	19.83	19.83	q
12	Janus Robberts	South Africa	B	19.75	19.16	19.79	19.79	q
13	Bradley Snyder	Canada	A	19.77	X	19.59	19.77	
14	Burger Lambrechts	South Africa	A	X	19.74	19.75	19.75	
15	Ville Tiisanoja	Finland	B	19.04	19.44	19.66	19.66	
16	Dragan Peric	FR Yugoslavia	A	19.04	19.46	19.49	19.49	
17	Joachim Olsen	Denmark	B	19.32	X	19.41	19.41	
18	Pavel Chumachenko	Russia	B	18.99	19.40	X	19.40	
19	Paolo Dal Soglio	Italy	B	19.39	X	X	19.39	
20	Roman Virastyuk	Ukraine	A	18.91	19.04	19.27	19.27	
21	Chima Ugwu	Nigeria	A	19.07	19.11	X	19.11	
22	Karel Potgieter	South Africa	A	19.02	X	19.00	19.02	
23	Mikulas Konopka	Slovakia	A	18.59	X	18.99	18.99	
24	Stevimir Ercegovac	Croatia	A	18.74	18.98	X	18.98	
25	Szilard Kiss	Hungary	B	18.60	18.61	18.95	18.95	
26	Michael Mertens	Germany	B	18.64	18.48	18.72	18.72	
27	Bahadur Singh Sagoo	India	B	18.70	X	X	18.70	
28	Saulius Kleiza	Lithuania	A	18.57	X	18.59	18.59	
29	Justin Anlezark	Australia	B	18.59	18.11	18.46	18.59	
30	Gheorghe Guset	Romania	A	18.46	X	18.56	18.56	
31	Mark Proctor	Great Britain	B	X	18.49	X	18.49	
32	Shakti Singh	India	A	18.40	17.96	18.13	18.40	
33	Alexis Paumier	Cuba	A	18.31	X	18.04	18.31	
34	Bilal Saad Mubarak	Qatar	B	18.30	X	X	18.30	
35	Vaios Tigkas	Greece	A	17.52	18.13	17.84	18.13	
36	Ivan Emilianov	Moldova	B	X	17.38	17.63	17.63	
37	Sergey Rubtsov	Kazakhstan	B	15.49	15.90	X	15.90	

=== Final ===
Rank	Athlete	Nation	1	2	3	4	5	6	Distance	Notes
1st place, gold medalist(s)	Arsi Harju	Finland	21.20	21.29	20.77	X	20.37	X	21.29	
2nd place, silver medalist(s)	Adam Nelson	United States	20.53	21.20	21.21	X	20.97	X	21.21	
3rd place, bronze medalist(s)	John Godina	United States	X	20.40	20.25	20.71	21.20	X	21.20	
4	Andrew Bloom	United States	20.87	X	20.11	X	19.92	20.16	20.87	
5	Yuriy Bilonoh	Ukraine	20.57	20.84	X	20.43	20.22	X	20.84	
6	Manuel Martínez Gutiérrez	Spain	19.89	19.45	X	19.50	20.55	19.70	20.55	NR
7	Janus Robberts	South Africa	18.81	19.72	X	18.87	19.06	20.32	20.32	
8	Oliver-Sven Buder	Germany	19.89	20.18	X	19.64	X	X	20.18	
9	Andrey Mikhnevich	Belarus	19.48	X	X	Did not advance			19.48	
10	Miroslav Menc	Czech Republic	19.02	19.16	19.39	Did not advance			19.39	
11	Milan Haborák	Slovakia	X	X	19.06	Did not advance			19.06	
12	Timo Aaltonen	Finland	X	18.64	X	Did not advance			18.64	
