= 1995 World Championships in Athletics – Men's shot put =

These are the official results of the Men's Shot Put event at the 1995 IAAF World Championships in Gothenburg, Sweden. There were a total of 32 participating athletes, with the final held on Wednesday August 9, 1995. The qualification mark was set at 19.80 metres.

== Medalists ==
Gold	John Godina; United States (USA)
Silver	Mika Halvari; Finland (FIN)
Bronze	Randy Barnes; United States (USA)

== Schedule ==
- All times are Central European Time (UTC+1)

Qualification Round
Group A	Group B
08.08.1995 – 15:45h	08.08.1995 – 15:45h
Final Round
09.08.1995 – 18:30h

== Abbreviations ==
- All results shown are in metres

Q	automatic qualification
q	qualification by rank
DNS	did not start
NM	no mark
WR	world record
AR	area record
NR	national record
PB	personal best
SB	season best

== Records ==
Standing records prior to the 1993 World Athletics Championships
World Record	Randy Barnes (USA)	23.12 m	May 20, 1990	Westwood, United States
Event Record	Werner Günthör (SUI)	22.23 m	August 29, 1987	Rome, Italy

== Qualification ==
- Held on Tuesday 1995-08-08

RANK	GROUP A	DISTANCE
1.	Mika Halvari (FIN)	20.40 m
2.	Brent Noon (USA)	19.84 m
3.	Roman Virastyuk (UKR)	19.74 m
4.	Aleksandr Klimenko (UKR)	19.22 m
5.	Saulius Kleiza (LTU)	18.99 m
6.	Georg Andersen (NOR)	18.84 m
7.	Arsi Harju (FIN)	18.79 m
8.	Alessandro Andrei (ITA)	18.74 m
9.	Kent Larsson (SWE)	18.73 m
10.	Yojer Medina (VEN)	18.58 m
11.	Thorsten Herbrand (GER)	18.30 m
12.	Mark Proctor (GBR)	18.08 m
13.	Corrado Fantini (ITA)	17.89 m
14.	Miroslav Menc (CZE)	17.54 m
15.	Oakland Salavea (ASA)	12.80 m
—	Pétur Guðmundsson (ISL)	DNS

RANK	GROUP B	DISTANCE
1.	Randy Barnes (USA)	21.30 m
2.	Oleksandr Bagach (UKR)	20.60 m
3.	John Godina (USA)	19.99 m
4.	Oliver-Sven Buder (GER)	19.91 m
5.	Markus Koistinen (FIN)	19.88 m
6.	Paolo Dal Soglio (ITA)	19.47 m
7.	Bilal Saad Mubarak (QAT)	19.01 m
8.	Dzimitry Hancharuk (BLR)	19.00 m
9.	Jonny Reinhardt (GER)	18.89 m
10.	Sergey Rubtsov (KAZ)	18.81 m
11.	Manuel Martínez (ESP)	18.50 m
12.	Henrik Wennberg (SWE)	18.38 m
13.	Christian Nebl (AUT)	18.33 m
14.	Sergey Kot (UZB)	17.03 m
15.	Aufata Faleata (SAM)	11.04 m
—	Konstantinos Kollias (GRE)	NM

== Final ==
Rank	Athlete	Attempts						Result	Note
Rank	Athlete	1	2	3	4	5	6	Result	Note
1st place, gold medalist(s)	John Godina (USA)	21.47	20.54	19.82	19.26	19.97	—	21.47 m	
2nd place, silver medalist(s)	Mika Halvari (FIN)	20.22	X	20.19	20.33	20.93	20.35	20.93 m	
3rd place, bronze medalist(s)	Randy Barnes (USA)	19.47	20.22	20.41	X	X	X	20.41 m	
4	Oleksandr Bagach (UKR)	20.38	20.23	20.27	20.28	X	20.16	20.38 m	
5	Brent Noon (USA)	20.13	19.19	X	19.59	X	20.01	20.13 m	
6	Oliver-Sven Buder (GER)	20.11	X	20.04	X	19.45	X	20.11 m	
7	Roman Virastyuk (UKR)	19.66	18.94	19.13	X	X	X	19.66 m	
8	Dzimitry Hancharuk (BLR)	19.38	19.21	19.30	19.22	X	X	19.38 m	
9	Paolo Dal Soglio (ITA)	X	X	19.38	19.30	X	X	19.38 m	
10	Markus Koistinen (FIN)	19.34	X	18.83				19.34 m	
11	Bilal Saad Mubarak (QAT)	18.56	18.52	X				18.56 m	
12	Aleksandr Klimenko (UKR)	18.26	18.23	X				18.26 m	

== See also ==
- 1995 Shot Put Year Ranking
