= 1999 World Championships in Athletics – Men's shot put =

These are the official results of the Men's Shot Put event at the 1999 World Championships in Seville, Spain. There were a total number of 28 participating athletes, with the final held on Saturday 21 August 1999.

== Medalists ==
Gold	C.J. Hunter; United States (USA)
Silver	Oliver-Sven Buder; Germany (GER)
Bronze	Aleksandr Bagach; Ukraine (UKR)

== Schedule ==
- All times are Central European Time (UTC+1)

Qualification Round
Group A	Group B
21.08.1999 – 10:25h	21.08.1999 – 10:25h
Final Round
21.08.1999 – 19:50h

== Abbreviations ==
- All results shown are in metres

Q	automatic qualification
q	qualification by rank
DNS	did not start
NM	no mark
WR	world record
AR	area record
NR	national record
PB	personal best
SB	season best

== Qualification ==
- Held on Saturday 21 August 1999

RANK	GROUP A	DISTANCE
1.	John Godina (USA)	20.69 m
2.	Oliver-Sven Buder (GER)	20.50 m
3.	Yuriy Bilonoh (UKR)	20.47 m
4.	Arsi Harju (FIN)	20.16 m
5.	Andy Bloom (USA)	20.07 m
6.	Burger Lambrechts (RSA)	19.93 m
7.	Saulius Kleiza (LTU)	19.83 m
8.	Roman Virastyuk (UKR)	19.73 m
9.	Mark Proctor (GBR)	19.63 m
10.	Paolo Dal Soglio (ITA)	19.48 m
11.	Gunnar Pfingsten (GER)	19.47 m
12.	Pavol Pankúch (SVK)	19.37 m
13.	Shakti Singh (IND)	18.58 m
14.	Mihalis Louka (CYP)	18.54 m

RANK	GROUP B	DISTANCE
1.	Kevin Toth (USA)	20.52 m
2.	C.J. Hunter (USA)	20.36 m
3.	Dragan Peric (YUG)	20.27 m
4.	Aleksandr Bagach (UKR)	20.12 m
5.	Ville Tiisanoja (FIN)	19.87 m
6.	Mika Halvari (FIN)	19.61 m
7.	Gheorghe Guset (ROM)	19.46 m
8.	Michael Mertens (GER)	19.37 m
9.	Janus Robberts (RSA)	19.37 m
10.	Joachim Olsen (DEN)	19.13 m
11.	Fernando Alves (POR)	18.98 m
12.	Andrey Mikhnevich (BLR)	18.93 m
13.	Vaios Tigas (GRE)	18.50 m
14.	Milan Haborák (SVK)	18.37 m

== Final ==
Rank	Athlete	Attempts						Distance	Note
Rank	Athlete	1	2	3	4	5	6	Distance	Note
1st place, gold medalist(s)	C.J. Hunter (USA)	20.62	X	20.65	X	21.09	21.79	21.79 m	
2nd place, silver medalist(s)	Oliver-Sven Buder (GER)	20.60	21.03	20.88	21.42	X	20.47	21.42 m	
3rd place, bronze medalist(s)	Aleksandr Bagach (UKR)	20.60	21.00	X	X	X	21.26	21.26 m	
4	Andy Bloom (USA)	20.05	20.61	20.95	X	X	20.35	20.95 m	
5	Yuriy Bilonoh (UKR)	20.60	X	X	20.37	X	X	20.60 m	
6	Dragan Perić (YUG)	X	20.35	X	X	20.01	X	20.35 m	
7	John Godina (USA)	X	20.35	X	X	X	X	20.35 m	
8	Ville Tiisanoja (FIN)	19.93	19.60	19.46	19.87	X	X	19.93 m	
9	Burger Lambrechts (RSA)	X	19.29	X				19.29 m	
10	Saulius Kleiza (LTU)	18.51	19.01	X				19.01 m	
—	Kevin Toth (USA)	X	X	X				NM	
—	Arsi Harju (FIN)	X	X	X				NM	

== See also ==
- 1999 Shot Put Year Ranking
