= 1998 European Athletics Indoor Championships – Men's shot put =

The men's shot put event at the 1998 European Athletics Indoor Championships was held on 28 February.

== Medalists ==
Gold	Silver	Bronze
Oliver-Sven Buder; Germany	Mika Halvari; Finland	Arsi Harju; Finland

== Results ==
=== Qualification ===
Rank	Athlete	Nationality	#1	#2	#3	Result	Notes
1	Oliver-Sven Buder	Germany	20.51			20.51	Q
2	Manuel Martínez	Spain	19.99	18.38	–	19.99	q
3	Dragan Perić	Yugoslavia	19.93	–	–	19.93	q
4	Mika Halvari	Finland	19.74	19.60	–	19.74	q
5	Roman Virastyuk	Ukraine	19.55	19.72	x	19.72	q
6	Paolo Dal Soglio	Italy	19.72	19.52	x	19.72	q
7	Arsi Harju	Finland	18.79	19.50	19.37	19.50	q
8	Oleksandr Bagach	Ukraine	19.46	19.15	19.25	19.46	q
9	Pavel Chumachenko	Russia	18.79	x	19.44	19.44	q
10	Michael Mertens	Germany	19.22	18.93	18.95	19.22	q
11	Corrado Fantini	Italy	x	18.83	18.98	18.98	q
12	Oliver Dück	Germany	18.02	18.84	18.59	18.84	
13	Shaun Pickering	Great Britain	x	x	18.82	18.82	
14	Yuriy Bilonoh	Ukraine	18.69	17.93	x	18.69	
15	Mark Proctor	Great Britain	x	18.66	x	18.66	
16	Andrei Mikhnevich	Belarus	18.54	x	17.81	18.54	
17	Gheorghe Guşet	Romania	17.95	18.22	x	18.22	
18	Jean-Louis Lebon	France	17.49	x	17.68	17.68	
19	Rocky Vaitanaki	France	17.36	16.90	x	17.36	
	Miroslav Menc	Czech Republic	19.87	19.09	–	DQ	Doping
	Kristian Pettersson	Sweden				DNS	
	Stéphane Vial	France				DNS	
	Margus Tammaru	Estonia				DNS	

=== Final ===
Rank	Athlete	Nationality	#1	#2	#3	#4	#5	#6	Result	Notes
1st place, gold medalist(s)	Oliver-Sven Buder	Germany	x	21.47	x	21.01	x	–	21.47	
2nd place, silver medalist(s)	Mika Halvari	Finland	x	20.05	20.59	20.02	x	x	20.59	
3rd place, bronze medalist(s)	Arsi Harju	Finland	20.51	20.40	20.53	20.11	20.33	x	20.53	
4	Dragan Perić	Yugoslavia	20.21	19.89	x	x	x	x	20.21	
5	Roman Virastyuk	Ukraine	20.01	x	20.19	19.99	20.03	20.03	20.21	
6	Manuel Martínez	Spain	20.09	19.82	x	x	19.83	19.57	20.09	
7	Oleksandr Bagach	Ukraine	19.57	19.89	19.82	x	19.62	x	19.89	
8	Michael Mertens	Germany	19.16	19.08	19.68				19.68	
9	Paolo Dal Soglio	Italy	x	x	19.66				19.66	
10	Pavel Chumachenko	Russia	19.00	19.55	19.19				19.55	
11	Corrado Fantini	Italy	18.84	19.47	19.24				19.47	
	Miroslav Menc	Czech Republic	19.96	19.72	19.73	19.76	20.17	19.50	DQ	Doping
