= 1997 IAAF World Indoor Championships – Men's shot put =

The men's shot put event at the 1997 IAAF World Indoor Championships was held on March 7.

== Medalists ==
Gold	Silver	Bronze
Yuriy Bilonoh; Ukraine	Oleksandr Bagach; Ukraine	John Godina; United States

== Results ==
=== Qualification ===
Qualification: 19.80 (Q) or at least 12 best performers (q) qualified for the final.

Rank	Group	Athlete	Nationality	#1	#2	#3	Result	Notes
1	A	John Godina	United States	20.46			20.46	Q
2	B	Oliver-Sven Buder	Germany	19.58	20.06		20.06	Q
3	A	Mika Halvari	Finland	20.04			20.04	Q
3	B	Arsi Harju	Finland	20.04			20.04	Q
5	B	Miroslav Menc	Czech Republic	19.11	20.01		20.01	Q, PB
6	A	Manuel Martínez	Spain	19.96			19.96	Q
7	B	Oleksandr Bagach	Ukraine	19.91			19.91	Q
8	B	Paolo Dal Soglio	Italy	19.82			19.82	Q
9	B	Mark Parlin	United States	19.81			19.81	Q
10	A	Kjell Ove Hauge	Norway	18.74	19.19	19.78	19.78	q
11	A	Yuriy Bilonoh	Ukraine	19.62	19.42	x	19.62	q
12	A	Corrado Fantini	Italy	18.90	19.59	19.50	19.59	q
13	A	Michael Mertens	Germany	19.43	18.84	19.06	19.43	
14	A	Dmitriy Goncharuk	Belarus	18.44	19.43	x	19.43	PB
15	A	Mark Proctor	Great Britain	17.97	x	19.21	19.21	
16	A	Fernando Alves	Portugal	18.98	18.64	18.81	18.98	NR
17	B	Virgilijus Alekna	Lithuania	18.90	18.87	x	18.90	
18	A	Pavel Chumachenko	Russia	18.88	18.58	x	18.88	
19	B	Andreas Gustafsson	Sweden	18.67	18.66	x	18.67	
20	B	Matt Simson	Great Britain	x	x	18.30	18.30	
21	B	Bilal Saad Mubarak	Qatar	18.29	x	x	18.29	
	B	Jorge Vazquez	Paraguay	x	x	x	NM	

=== Final ===
Rank	Name	Nationality	#1	#2	#3	#4	#5	#6	Result	Notes
1st place, gold medalist(s)	Yuriy Bilonoh	Ukraine	20.46	21.02	20.83	–	20.92	20.85	21.02	PB
2nd place, silver medalist(s)	Oleksandr Bagach	Ukraine	20.49	20.68	20.79	20.42	20.94	20.67	20.94	SB
3rd place, bronze medalist(s)	John Godina	United States	20.80	20.85	–	20.34	20.87	20.57	20.87	
4	Oliver-Sven Buder	Germany	20.70	–	–	20.20	–	20.07	20.70	
5	Manuel Martínez	Spain	19.97	18.98	19.86	19.80	20.37	–	20.37	NR
6	Mika Halvari	Finland	20.22	19.75	20.17	–	–	20.10	20.22	
7	Corrado Fantini	Italy	–	20.02	19.56	–	18.96	19.89	20.02	
8	Arsi Harju	Finland	19.43	–	20.00	–	19.79	–	20.00	
9	Miroslav Menc	Czech Republic	19.66	19.19	19.55				19.66	
10	Mark Parlin	United States	19.44	–	–				19.44	
11	Kjell Ove Hauge	Norway	–	19.42	18.76				19.42	
	Paolo Dal Soglio	Italy	–	–	–				NM	
