= 1998 European Athletics Championships – Men's shot put =

Men's shot put at the European Athletics Championships

The men's shot put at the 1998 European Athletics Championships was held at the Népstadion on 18 August.

== Medalists ==
Gold	Oleksandr Bagach; Ukraine
Silver	Oliver-Sven Buder; Germany
Bronze	Yuriy Bilonoh; Ukraine

== Results ==
KEY:	q	Better non-qualifiers	Q	Qualified	NR	National record	PB	Personal best	SB	Seasonal best

=== Qualification ===
Qualification: Qualification Performance 20.00 (Q) or at least 12 best performers advance to the final.

Rank	Group	Athlete	Nationality	#1	#2	#3	Result	Notes
1	B	Oleksandr Bagach	Ukraine	20.47			20.47	Q
2	B	Dragan Perić	FR Yugoslavia				20.44	Q
3	A	Oliver-Sven Buder	Germany	19.64	20.33		20.33	Q
4	A	Yuriy Bilonoh	Ukraine				19.76	q
4	A	Arsi Harju	Finland	19.17	19.76		19.76	q
4	B	Mika Halvari	Finland	19.56	19.66	19.76	19.76	q
7	A	Paolo Dal Soglio	Italy				19.75	q
8	B	Manuel Martínez Gutiérrez	Spain	19.54	x	x	19.54	q
9	A	Gheorghe Guşet	Romania				19.32	q
10	A	Timo Aaltonen	Finland	x		19.28	19.28	q
10	B	Michael Mertens	Germany				19.28	q
12	A	Fernando Alves	Portugal				19.20	q, NR
13	B	Vasyl Virastyuk	Ukraine				19.15	
14	A	Oliver Duck	Germany				19.12	
15	A	Pavel Pankuch	Slovakia				18.95	
16	B	Attila Pintér	Hungary				18.94	
17	B	Andrei Mikhnevich	Belarus				18.88	
18	B	Corrado Fantini	Italy				18.64	
19	B	Mikuláš Konopka	Slovakia				18.63	
20	B	Saulius Kleiza	Lithuania				18.57	
21	A	Henrik Wennberg	Sweden				18.48	
22	B	Milan Haborák	Slovakia				18.10	
23	A	Pétur Guðmundsson	Iceland				17.89	
24	B	Shaun Pickering	Great Britain	x	x	17.80	17.80	
	A	Stéphane Vial	France				NM	
	A	Viktor Bulat	Belarus				NM	
	A	Mark Proctor	Great Britain	x	x	x	NM	
	B	Sören Tallhem	Sweden				NM	

=== Final ===
Rank	Athlete	Nationality	#1	#2	#3	#4	#5	#6	Result	Notes
1st place, gold medalist(s)	Oleksandr Bagach	Ukraine	20.02	20.26	20.99	20.98	21.10	21.17	21.17	SB
2nd place, silver medalist(s)	Oliver-Sven Buder	Germany	20.47	20.59	20.55	20.44	20.98	20.82	20.98	SB
3rd place, bronze medalist(s)	Yuriy Bilonoh	Ukraine	20.05	20.35	20.41	x	20.45	20.92	20.92	PB
4	Dragan Perić	FR Yugoslavia	20.28	20.46	x	20.37	x	20.65	20.65	
5	Paolo Dal Soglio	Italy	19.91	20.50	x	x	19.55	x	20.50	
6	Mika Halvari	Finland	19.61	20.29	20.33	19.64	20.14	19.94	20.33	
7	Manuel Martínez Gutiérrez	Spain	20.02	19.21	19.35	18.50	19.23	x	20.02	SB
8	Michael Mertens	Germany	19.45	19.25	19.67	19.21	19.37	19.38	19.67	
9	Arsi Harju	Finland	19.54	19.53	x				19.54	
10	Gheorghe Guşet	Romania	18.68	18.87	18.73				18.87	
11	Fernando Alves	Portugal	18.84	x	18.54				18.84	
12	Timo Aaltonen	Finland	18.03	18.27	18.59				18.59	
