= Athletics at the 1996 Summer Olympics – Men's shot put =

Men's shot put at the Games of the XXVI Olympiad
- Pictogram of athletics
- Venues: Centennial Olympic Stadium
- Date: July 26
- Competitors: 36 from 26 nations
- Winning distance: 21.62

Medalists
| 1st place, gold medalist(s) | | Randy Barnes; United States |
| 2nd place, silver medalist(s) | | John Godina; United States |
| 3rd place, bronze medalist(s) | | Oleksandr Bagach; Ukraine |

The men's shot put event at the 1996 Summer Olympics in Atlanta, Georgia. There were 36 competitors from 26 nations, with twelve athletes reaching the final. The maximum number of athletes per nation had been set at 3 since the 1930 Olympic Congress. The event took place on July 26, 1996. The event was won by Randy Barnes of the United States, the nation's second consecutive and 16th overall victory in the men's shot put. Barnes was the 11th man to win multiple medals in the event, and the first to do so in nonconsecutive Games. His teammate John Godina took silver, while Oleksandr Bagach earned Ukraine's first medal in the event with a bronze.

== Background ==
This was the 23rd appearance of the event, which is one of 12 athletics events to have been held at every Summer Olympics. The only returning finalist from the 1992 Games was seventh-place finisher Dragan Perić, then an Independent Olympic Participant and now representing Yugoslavia. The 1988 silver medalist Randy Barnes of the United States, who set a world record in 1990 that is still extant in 2020, also returned after missing the 1992 Games while suspended. Barnes was the favorite, with the best throw of the year to date.

American Samoa, Belarus, Cyprus, the Czech Republic, Kazakhstan, Lithuania, Ukraine, Uzbekistan, and Venezuela each made their debut in the men's shot put. The United States made its 22nd appearance, most of any nation, having missed only the boycotted 1980 Games.

== Competition format ==
The competition used the two-round format introduced in 1936, with the qualifying round completely separate from the divided final. In qualifying, each athlete received three attempts; those recording a mark of at least 19.80 metres advanced to the final. If fewer than 12 athletes achieved that distance, the top 12 would advance. The results of the qualifying round were then ignored. Finalists received three throws each, with the top eight competitors receiving an additional three attempts. The best distance among those six throws counted.

== Records ==
The standing world and Olympic records prior to the 1996 Games were as follows.

| World record | Randy Barnes (USA) | 23.12 | Los Angeles, United States | 22 May 1988 |
| Olympic record | Ulf Timmermann (GDR) | 22.47 | Seoul, South Korea | 23 September 1988 |

No new world or Olympic records were set during the competition.

== Schedule ==
All times are Eastern Daylight Time (UTC-4)

| Date | Time | Round |
|---|---|---|
| Friday, 26 July 1996 | 10:05; 19:10 | Qualifying; Final |

== Results ==
=== Qualification ===
| Rank | Athlete | Nation | 1 | 2 | 3 | Distance | Notes |
|---|---|---|---|---|---|---|---|
| 1 | Paolo Dal Soglio | Italy | 19.43 | 20.58 | — | 20.58 | Q |
| 2 | John Godina | United States | 20.54 | — | — | 20.54 | Q |
| 3 | Oliver-Sven Buder | Germany | 19.76 | 20.43 | — | 20.43 | Q |
| 4 | Randy Barnes | United States | X | 19.70 | 20.42 | 20.42 | Q |
| 5 | Oleksandr Bagach | Ukraine | 20.23 | — | — | 20.23 | Q |
| 6 | C. J. Hunter | United States | 19.95 | — | — | 19.95 | Q |
| 7 | Roman Virastyuk | Ukraine | 19.81 | — | — | 19.81 | Q |
| 8 | Dragan Perić | FR Yugoslavia | 19.61 | X | 19.61 | 19.61 | q |
| 9 | Dzimitry Hancharuk | Belarus | 19.57 | X | 19.17 | 19.57 | q |
| 10 | Oleksandr Klymenko | Ukraine | 19.11 | 19.45 | X | 19.45 | q |
| 11 | Corrado Fantini | Italy | 18.63 | 19.40 | 19.00 | 19.40 | q |
| 12 | Bilal Saad Mubarak | Qatar | 19.39 | 19.23 | 19.28 | 19.39 | q |
| 13 | Dirk Urban | Germany | 19.39 | 18.82 | 19.23 | 19.39 | |
| 14 | Mika Halvari | Finland | 19.37 | X | 18.78 | 19.37 | |
| 15 | Manuel Martínez | Spain | 19.12 | 18.93 | 18.90 | 19.12 | |
| 16 | Michael Mertens | Germany | 18.57 | 18.90 | 19.07 | 19.07 | |
| 17 | Kent Larsson | Sweden | 18.60 | 18.86 | 19.05 | 19.05 | |
| 18 | Arsi Harju | Finland | 18.56 | 19.01 | X | 19.01 | |
| 19 | Giorgio Venturi | Italy | 18.60 | 18.98 | 18.52 | 18.98 | |
| 20 | Yevgeny Palchikov | Russia | 18.75 | 18.83 | 18.96 | 18.96 | |
| 21 | Miroslav Menc | Czech Republic | 18.69 | 18.13 | 18.42 | 18.69 | |
| 22 | Gert Weil | Chile | 18.64 | 18.67 | 18.58 | 18.67 | |
| 23 | Yojer Medina | Venezuela | X | 18.49 | 18.53 | 18.53 | |
| 24 | Ilias Louka | Cyprus | 18.48 | 17.98 | X | 18.48 | |
| 25 | Chima Ugwu | Nigeria | 18.39 | 18.35 | 18.33 | 18.39 | |
| 26 | Aleksey Shidlovsky | Russia | 17.84 | 18.34 | 18.37 | 18.37 | |
| 27 | Shaun Pickering | Great Britain | 18.29 | 18.23 | 17.45 | 18.29 | |
| 28 | Mikhalis Louka | Cyprus | 18.23 | 18.03 | 18.12 | 18.23 | |
| 29 | Khalid Al-Khalidi | Saudi Arabia | 18.22 | X | 17.83 | 18.22 | |
| 30 | Saulius Kleiza | Lithuania | 18.08 | 18.21 | 18.18 | 18.21 | |
| 31 | Bradley Snyder | Canada | 17.98 | X | X | 17.98 | |
| 32 | Viktor Bulat | Belarus | 16.70 | 16.67 | 17.29 | 17.29 | |
| 33 | Sergey Kot | Uzbekistan | 16.51 | X | 16.05 | 16.51 | |
| 34 | Anthony Leiato | American Samoa | 12.28 | X | 13.02 | 13.02 | |
| — | Jenő Kóczián | Hungary | X | X | X | No mark | |
| — | Sergey Rubtsov | Kazakhstan | X | — | — | No mark | |

=== Final ===
| Rank | Athlete | Nation | 1 | 2 | 3 | 4 | 5 | 6 | Distance |
|---|---|---|---|---|---|---|---|---|---|
| 1st place, gold medalist(s) | Randy Barnes | United States | 19.46 | 20.44 | X | 20.26 | 20.32 | 21.62 | 21.62 |
| 2nd place, silver medalist(s) | John Godina | United States | X | 19.91 | 19.98 | 20.64 | 20.79 | X | 20.79 |
| 3rd place, bronze medalist(s) | Oleksandr Bagach | Ukraine | 20.41 | 20.50 | 20.29 | X | X | 20.75 | 20.75 |
| 4 | Paolo Dal Soglio | Italy | 20.12 | 20.65 | 19.92 | 20.74 | 20.60 | X | 20.74 |
| 5 | Oliver-Sven Buder | Germany | 20.16 | 19.92 | 20.37 | 20.13 | 20.51 | 19.71 | 20.51 |
| 6 | Roman Virastyuk | Ukraine | 19.46 | 19.86 | 20.32 | 20.21 | 20.45 | X | 20.45 |
| 7 | C. J. Hunter | United States | 19.99 | 20.09 | 20.39 | X | 20.25 | 20.35 | 20.39 |
| 8 | Dragan Perić | FR Yugoslavia | 19.66 | 19.75 | 19.98 | X | X | 20.07 | 20.07 |
| 9 | Dzimitry Hancharuk | Belarus | X | 19.79 | X | Did not advance | | | 19.79 |
| 10 | Bilal Saad Mubarak | Qatar | 19.11 | 19.33 | X | Did not advance | | | 19.33 |
| 11 | Corrado Fantini | Italy | 19.30 | X | X | Did not advance | | | 19.30 |
| — | Oleksandr Klymenko | Ukraine | X | X | X | Did not advance | | | No mark |

== See also ==
- 1995 World Championships in Athletics – Men's shot put
- 1997 World Championships in Athletics – Men's shot put
