= 2000 European Athletics Indoor Championships – Men's shot put =

The men's shot put event at the 2000 European Athletics Indoor Championships was held on February 26–27.

== Medalists ==
Gold	Silver	Bronze
Timo Aaltonen; Finland	Manuel Martínez; Spain	Miroslav Menc; Czech Republic

Note: The original winner, Oleksandr Bagach, was later disqualified for doping.

== Results ==
=== Qualification ===
Qualifying perf. 20.00 (Q) or 8 best performers (q) advanced to the Final.

Rank	Athlete	Nationality	#1	#2	#3	Result	Note
1	Timo Aaltonen	Finland	20.57			20.57	Q, PB
2	Tepa Reinikainen	Finland	19.89	20.01		20.01	Q
3	Roman Virastyuk	Ukraine	19.49	19.72	19.82	19.82	q
4	Manuel Martínez	Spain	19.35	19.72	19.77	19.77	q
5	Miroslav Menc	Czech Republic	19.21	19.18	19.66	19.66	q
6	Gheorghe Guset	Romania	19.17	19.56	X	19.56	q
7	Michael Mertens	Germany	19.02	19.50	X	19.50	q
8	Mikuláš Konopka	Slovakia	18.72	X	19.45	19.45	
9	Mark Proctor	Great Britain	19.42	18.75	X	19.42	
10	Paolo Dal Soglio	Italy	X	19.36	X	19.36	
11	Andy Dittmar	Germany	19.09	18.87	19.20	19.20	
12	Andrei Mikhnevich	Belarus	19.08	X	X	19.08	
13	Milan Haborák	Slovakia	18.50	X	19.03	19.03	
14	Edhem Kacević	Bosnia and Herzegovina	18.43	18.43	18.28	18.43	
15	Stephane Vial	France	X	17.53	18.43	18.43	
16	Sergey Lyakhov	Russia	X	X	18.10	18.10	
17	Fernando Alves	Portugal	X	18.09	–	18.09	
18	Wim Blondeel	Belgium	X	17.45	X	17.45	
	Zsolt Bíber	Hungary	X	X	X	NM	
	Mika Halvari	Finland	X	X	X	NM	
	Jimmy Nordin	Sweden	X	X	X	NM	
	Oleksandr Bagach	Ukraine				DQ	

=== Final ===
Rank	Athlete	Nationality	#1	#2	#3	#4	#5	#6	Result	Note
1st place, gold medalist(s)	Timo Aaltonen	Finland	20.26	20.62	X	20.04	20.34	20.13	20.62	PB
2nd place, silver medalist(s)	Manuel Martínez	Spain	19.79	19.84	20.02	20.38	19.79	X	20.38	
3rd place, bronze medalist(s)	Miroslav Menc	Czech Republic	19.32	20.23	19.87	X	X	X	20.23	
4	Gheorghe Guset	Romania	20.14	X	20.11	X	20.02	20.21	20.21	
5	Roman Virastyuk	Ukraine	20.07	X	19.89	X	X	X	20.07	
6	Tepa Reinikainen	Finland	19.85	X	19.93	X	X	X	19.93	
7	Michael Mertens	Germany	X	19.79	19.39	19.89	19.68	19.37	19.89	PB
	Oleksandr Bagach	Ukraine							DQ	
