= 1995 IAAF World Indoor Championships – Men's shot put =

The men's shot put event at the 1995 IAAF World Indoor Championships was held on 10 March.

== Results ==
Rank	Name	Nationality	#1	#2	#3	#4	#5	#6	Results	Notes
1st place, gold medalist(s)	Mika Halvari	Finland	19.02	20.74	20.11	19.75	20.33	20.13	20.74	
2nd place, silver medalist(s)	C.J. Hunter	United States	19.72	20.58	20.03	20.30	x	20.31	20.58	
3rd place, bronze medalist(s)	Dragan Perić	Yugoslavia	19.24	19.68	x	20.35	x	20.36	20.36	
4	Manuel Martínez	Spain	19.17	x	19.97	19.19	19.37	19.85	19.97	
5	Yuriy Belonog	Ukraine	19.09	19.19	19.27	19.74	19.47	19.53	19.74	
6	Pétur Guðmundsson	Iceland	19.67	x	–	–	–	–	19.67	
7	Paolo Dal Soglio	Italy	18.63	x	19.26	x	x	19.44	19.44	
8	Oliver Dyck	Germany	17.95	18.66	19.24	x	x	x	19.24	
9	Thorsten Herbrand	Germany	19.08	18.84	18.37				19.08	
10	Corrado Fantini	Italy	18.74	x	x				18.74	
11	Roar Hoff	Norway	17.81	18.64	18.45				18.64	
12	Kevin Toth	United States	18.61	x	x				18.61	
13	Saulius Kleiza	Lithuania	x	18.41	x				18.41	
14	Yevgeniy Palchikov	Russia	18.15	x	18.33				18.33	
15	Carel le Roux	South Africa	17.84	x	18.24				18.24	
16	Sergey Rubtsov	Kazakhstan	18.08	x	17.01				18.08	
