= Robert Parker (coach) =

American track coach (1960–2021)

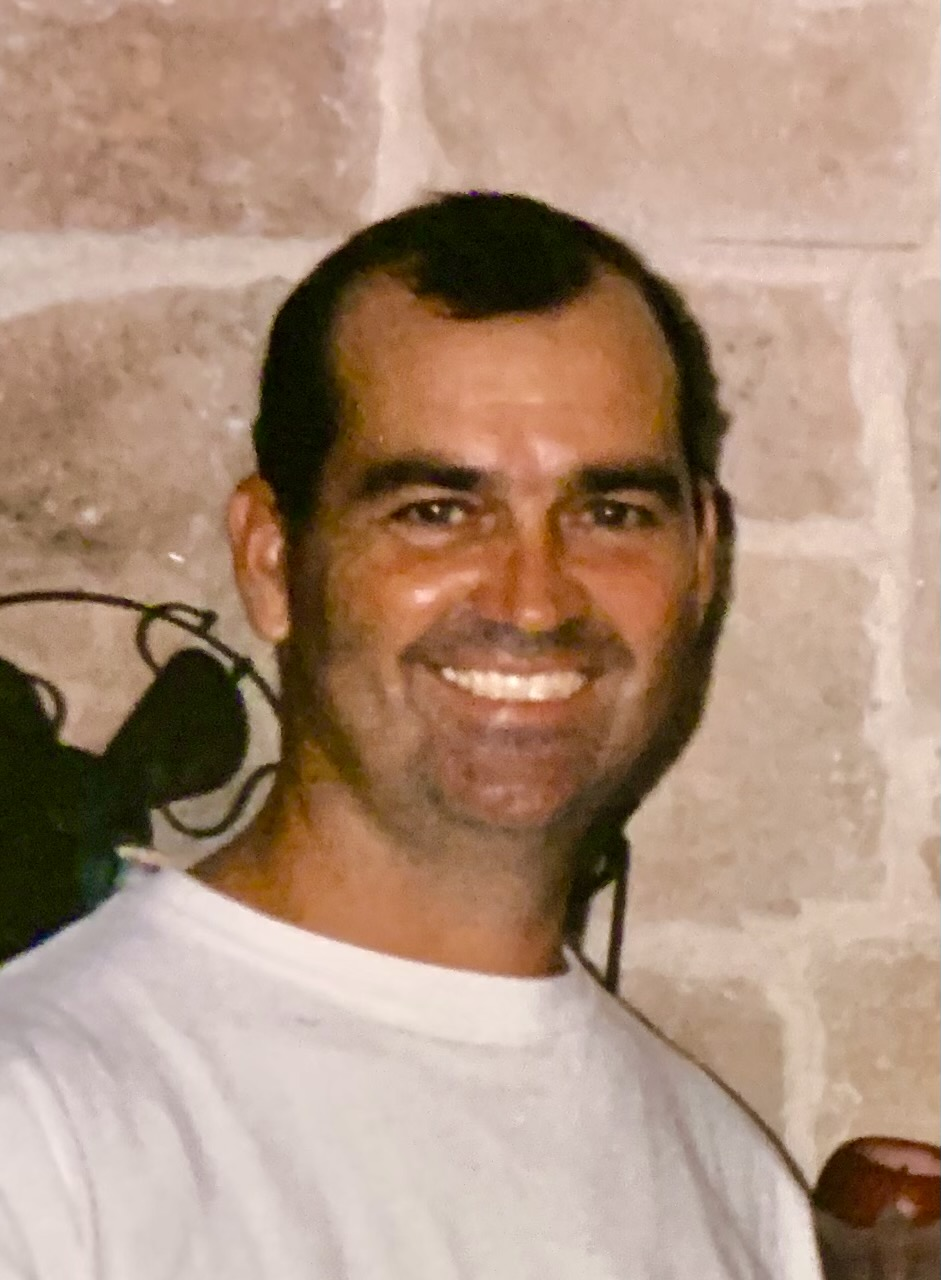
- Parker in 2000

Biographical details
- Born: September 24, 1960; Wharton, Texas, U.S.
- Died: April 20, 2021 (aged 60); Argyle, Texas, U.S.
- Education: Texas A&M

Playing career
- 1979–1982: South Plains
- 1982–1984: Angelo State
- Positions: Javelin, decathlon

Coaching career (HC unless noted)
- 1987–1991: Texas A&M (assistant)
- 1991-1993: Highland Park HS (TX)
- 1993–1994: UTEP
- 1994–1998: Kjell Ove Hauge (personal coach)

Accomplishments and honors

Championships
- NCAA Championship runner-up: 1994; NCAA Champions: 3 NCAA runners-up: 4

Records
- 2 world records (shot put)

Robert Lynn Parker (September 24, 1960 – April 20, 2021) was a college track and field coach for the throwing events at Texas A&M University and the University of Texas at El Paso. He coached several NCAA champions, but was most recognized for coaching the world record holder in the shot put, Randy Barnes.

== Biography ==
Parker was born in Wharton, Texas to Arnold Oliver Parker and Carmella Parker. Being an active track and field athlete he attended South Plains junior college in Levelland, Texas. He made All American honors in both javelin and decathlon. He then sought his Bachelor of Arts and Science from Angelo State University (ASU). He graduated from ASU in 1983 with the school record in the javelin. His record throw of 75.24 metres (246.9 ft) is still the school record as the implement rules were changed in 1986. A sports injury stopped his athletic career, and the following year Parker began his coaching and teaching career at Paris High School.

In 1985 Parker moved to College Station, Texas to pursue his Master of Education at Texas A&M University. While there he was a graduate assistant on the Texas A&M Aggies track and field team. Head coach Ted Nelson hired Parker as a full-time assistant coach for the field events in 1987.

Parker lived in Argyle in Denton County, married to Traci (nee Stevenson) and was the father of Tommy Parker, a two time state High School champion golfer.

He retired from teaching and coaching in 2000. He then moved into a new career as a financial advisor where he over the coming years worked with such companies as Merrill Lynch, Smith Barney, UBS and Wells Fargo.

== Coaching career ==
=== Texas A&M Aggies ===
In his four years as coach for the Aggies, Parker coached Olympic champions Mike Stulce and Randy Barnes. The highlights of those years were Barnes' world records. First, on January 20, 1989, when Barnes set a new indoor world record at the Sunkist Invitational in Los Angeles with a put of 22.66 metres (74.3 ft). The following year, on May 20, 1990, Barnes broke Ulf Timmermann's outdoor record with a put of 23.12 metres (75.9 ft) at UCLA Track and Field Invtitational at UCLA Bruinss Drake Stadium in Los Angeles. Six days later he recorded the world's second furthest throw at 23.10 metres (75.8 ft) at the Bruce Jenner Invitational San Jose City College in San Jose.

Sports Illustrated reported from Drake Stadium after the record toss:

"The 6'4 1/2", 300-pound Barnes leaped in the air, then hugged his coach, Robert Parker (..)" — Sports Illustrated,

Parker's coaching at Texas A&M led to 20 conference champions; 14 All-Americans; and a number of school and conference record-holders. Five of the shot putters under Parker's coaching are ranked in the Top 12 all-time at Texas A&M, along with 3 discus throwers, 2 javelin throwers, and 4 combined event athletes, as of April 2021.

=== UTEP Miners ===
In 1991 Parker started teaching and coaching at Highland Park High School in University Park, Texas. In the fall of 1993 Parker was hired as the assistant coach for the UTEP Miners in El Paso. There he coached Norwegian four time shot put-champion Kjell Ove Hauge to runner up at 1994 NCAA Championships, at Boise, Idaho, passing the 20 metres (66 ft) limit for the first time with 20.07. He lost only to Brent Noon, beating the upcoming world champion John Godina by more than 50 centimetres (20 in). At the same championships Parker also coached Greek hammer thrower Alexandros Papadimitriou to second place. Parker's two athletes scored 16 of the 45 total points for UTEP to place the team 2nd. As of 2020 it is still UTEP's best achievement at the NCAA Championships since the school's glory days in the 1970s and 80s.

Parker left El Paso after one year and went back to Dallas as a High School educator and coach at Flower Mound High School. He stayed on as Hauge's coach until 1998.
