= Dragan Perić =

Serbian shot putter (born 1964)

Medal record

Men's athletics

Representing FR Yugoslavia

World Indoor Championships
Bronze medal – third place	1995 Barcelona	Shot put

European Indoor Championships
Silver medal – second place	1994 Paris	Shot put

Dragan Perić (Serbian: Драган Перић, born 8 May 1964) is a Serbian shot putter who occasionally competed in the discus throw. He holds the Serbian records in both events. He represented Yugoslavia/Serbia and Montenegro in four consecutive Summer Olympics from 1992 to 2004, in eight World Championships from 1991 to 2005 and three European Championships from 1990 to 1998.

== Early career and international medals ==
He was born in Živinice, SR Bosnia and Herzegovina, but represented the clubs AK Sloboda Tuzla, AK Slavonija Osijek, AK Partizan and AK Crvena Zvezda in Belgrade. Before athletics, Dragan practised boxing. His former coaches were Nikola Tomasović, Dmitar Marceta and Veljko Čegar. His first European Championships was in 1990 in Split in his home country (then) Yugoslavia. Perić finished twelfth in the shot put final. He then finished seventh at the 1991 World Championships, seventh at the 1992 Olympic Games, fifth at the 1993 World Championships. In 1994, he won the silver medal at the European Indoor Championships, and finished sixth at both the 1994 European Championships and the IAAF Grand Prix Final. After that he won the bronze medal at the 1995 World Indoor Championships.

He passed the 19-metre barrier in 1988 with 19.92 metres, achieved in August in Osijek, and the 20-metre barrier in 1988 with 20.42 metres, achieved in September in Kranj. He improved this further to 20.47 metres in 1991, 20.91 metres in 1992 and 21.26 metres in 1993, all achieved in Belgrade. Two more meagre years followed before he came close in 1996 with 20.90 metres, achieved in August in Niš.

== Later career ==
After his success with international medals, the achievements became rarer. He finished eighth at the 1996 Olympic Games, fourth at the 1998 European Indoor Championships, fourth at the 1998 European Championships, sixth at the 1999 World Championships and fifth at the 2001 World Championships. He also competed at the 1997 World Championships, the 2000 Olympic Games, the 2003 World Championships, the 2004 Olympic Games and the 2005 World Championships without reaching the final.

Perić became Balkan champion in 1996, 1998 and 2003.

He became Yugoslav shot put champion every year from 1991 through 2001, except for one year, 1995. He also became discus champion in 1992, 1993, 1994 and 1997. When the country Serbia and Montenegro was formed he won several national titles there too.

He set his personal best in the shot put in this period, with 21.77 metres in April 1998 in Bar, Montenegro. He never threw over 21 metres again. He failed to even pass 20 metres in 2000 and 2002, but continued setting such marks for some years. His last season over 20 metres was in 2006, when he put 20.34 metres in September in Zenica. In the discus throw his personal best throw was 61.94 metres, achieved in May 1991 in Belgrade. Both results are Serbian records.

== Competition record ==
Year	Competition	Venue	Position	Event	Notes
Representing Yugoslavia
1987	Universiade	Zagreb, Yugoslavia	7th	Shot put	18.86 m
1987	Universiade	Zagreb, Yugoslavia	10th	Discus throw	52.20 m
1989	Universiade	Duisburg, West Germany	6th	Shot put	19.14 m
1990	European Championships	Split, Yugoslavia	12th	Shot put	18.67 m
1991	World Championships	Tokyo, Japan	7th	Shot put	19.83 m
Representing (International Olympic Committee) Independent Olympic Participants
1992	Olympic Games	Barcelona, Spain	7th	Shot put	20.32 m
Representing FR Yugoslavia/Serbia and Montenegro
1993	World Championships	Stuttgart, Germany	5th	Shot put	19.95 m
1994	European Indoor Championships	Paris, France	2nd	Shot put	20.55 m
1994	European Championships	Helsinki, Finland	6th	Shot put	19.40 m
1995	World Indoor Championships	Barcelona, Spain	3rd	Shot put	20.36 m
1996	Olympic Games	Atlanta, United States	8th	Shot put	20.07 m
1997	World Championships	Athens, Greece	18th (q)	Shot put	19.05 m
1998	European Indoor Championships	Valencia, Spain	4th	Shot put	20.21 m
1998	European Championships	Budapest, Hungary	4th	Shot put	20.65 m
1999	World Championships	Seville, Spain	6th	Shot put	20.35 m
2000	Olympic Games	Sydney, Australia	16th (q)	Shot put	19.49 m
2001	World Championships	Edmonton, Canada	5th	Shot put	20.91 m
2003	World Championships	Paris, France	17th (q)	Shot put	19.55 m
2004	Olympic Games	Athens, Greece	32nd (q)	Shot put	18.91 m
2005	World Championships	Helsinki, Finland	17th (q)	Shot put	19.46 m

== See also ==
- Serbian records in athletics
