= Manuel Martínez (athlete) =

Spanish shot putter (born 1974)

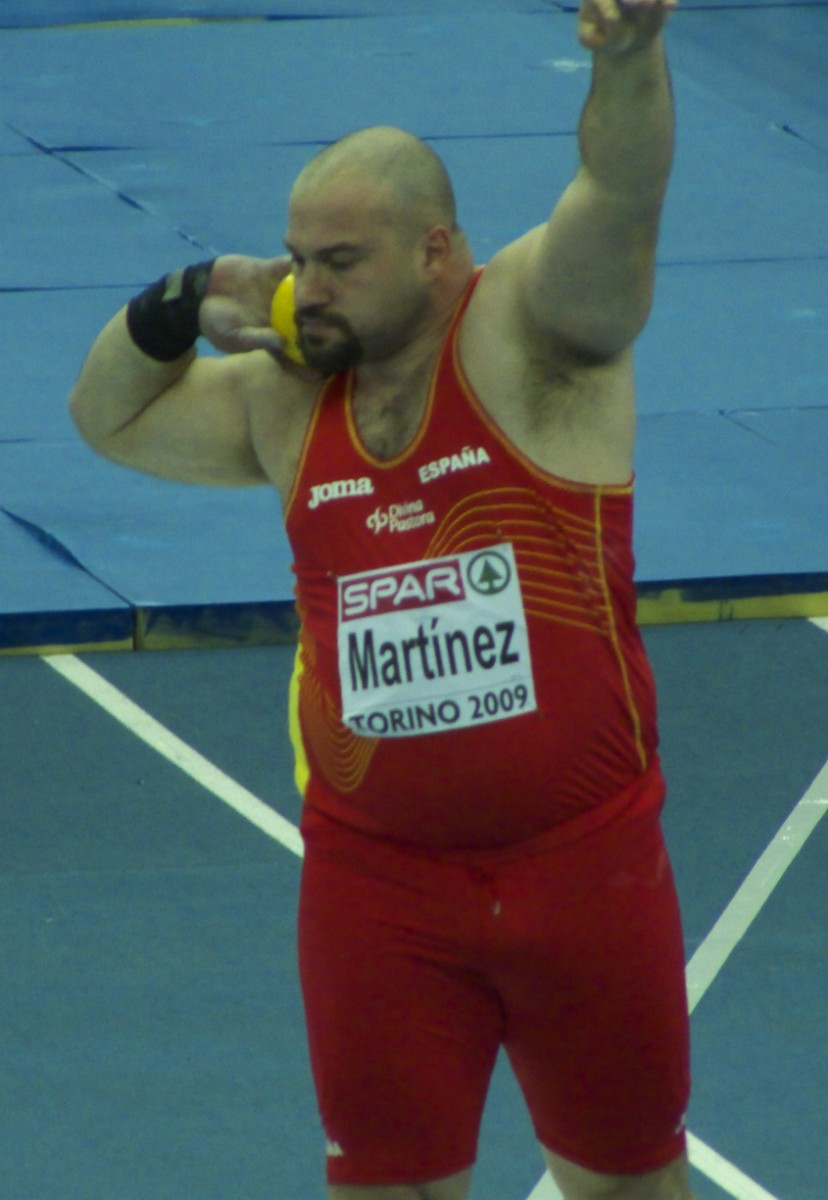

Personal information
- Full name: Manuel Martínez Gutiérrez
- Nicknames: Gentle Giant, Supermanolo
- Nationality: Spanish
- Born: December 7, 1974 (age 51) León, Spain
- Height: 1.85 m (6 ft 1 in)
- Weight: 140 kg (309 lb)

Sport
- Country: Spain
- Sport: Track and field
- Event: Shot put
- Club: C.D. Universidad León Atletismo
- Coached by: Carlos Burón
- Retired: 29 April 2011

Achievements and titles
- Personal bests: Indoor: 21.26 metres (69 ft 9 in); Outdoor: 21.47 metres (70 ft 5 in) (2002)
Medal record
Men's Athletics
Representing Spain
Olympic Games
Bronze medal – third place	2004 Athens	Shot put
World Indoor Championships
Gold medal – first place	2003 Birmingham	Shot put
Bronze medal – third place	2001 Lisbon	Shot put
European Indoor Championships
Gold medal – first place	2002 Vienna	Shot put
Silver medal – second place	2000 Ghent	Shot put
Bronze medal – third place	2005 Madrid	Shot put
Mediterranean Games
Gold medal – first place	2001 Tunis	Shot put
Gold medal – first place	2009 Pescara	Shot put
Silver medal – second place	2005 Almeria	Shot put
Summer Universiade
Gold medal – first place	2001 Beijing	Shot put

Manuel "Manolo" Martínez Gutiérrez (born December 7, 1974) is a retired Spanish shot putter. Nicknamed the "Gentle Giant", his personal best throw outdoors is 21.47 metres and he has an indoor best of 21.26 m. These marks are the Spanish national records for the event. His international career lasted from 1992 to 2011 and he earned national selection on 84 occasions – the most by any Spanish athlete.

Born in León, Spain, he established himself as a junior athlete at the age of seventeen by winning the silver medal at the World Junior Championships and becoming the European Junior Champion the following year. His first major medals as a senior thrower came indoors when he won silver at the 2000 European Athletics Indoor Championships and then secured the bronze at the 2001 IAAF World Indoor Championships.

His career highlights also came indoors, as he won at the 2002 European Indoor Championships and went on to take the gold medal at the 2003 World Indoor Championships. He scored the bronze medal at the 2004 Athens Olympics in May 2013 following an IAAF drug test disqualified the first-place participant.

He represented Spain at the Olympics four times consecutively from 1996 to 2008, and also competed at five consecutive editions of the European Athletics Championships. He participated in the shot put at every World Championships in Athletics from 1993 to 2009, with the sole exception of the 1999 event.

In other competitions, he was a two-time gold medallist at the Mediterranean Games (2001 and 2009), including a Games record of 21.03 m, won gold at the 2001 Summer Universiade, and won three titles at the Ibero-American Championships. He was also the bronze medallist at the 2001 Goodwill Games, 2004 IAAF World Athletics Final, and 2005 European Indoor Championships.

Martínez improved Spanish national records on 31 occasions in his career. He won 16 consecutive outdoor national titles in the shot put from 1993 to 2008, and also won 15 indoor titles. He competed domestically for C.D. Universidad León Atletismo and was coached by Carlos Burón. Martínez retired from competitive athletics in April 2011.

Outside of shot putting, he is an artist and an actor. He starred in Estigmas, a film directed by Adán Aliaga and produced by Jaibo Films. The film is adapted from Lorenzo Mattotti's comic, Stigmate. He performed the role of Goliat in 2011 film El Capitán Trueno y el Santo Grial and the role of Tyson in the 2012 series La fuga.

== International performances ==
Year	Competition	Venue	Position	Notes
1992	Ibero-American Championships	Seville, Spain	2nd	17.49 m
1992	World Junior Championships	Seoul, South Korea	2nd	18.14 m
1993	European Junior Championships	San Sebastián, Spain	1st	19.02 m
1993	Mediterranean Games	Narbonne, France	5th	18.59 m
1993	World Championships	Stuttgart, Germany	11th	19.03 m
1994	European Indoor Championships	Paris, France	4th	19.85 m
1994	Ibero-American Championships	Mar del Plata, Argentina	2nd	18.70 m
1994	European Championships	Helsinki, Finland	14th (q)	18.53 m
1995	World Indoor Championships	Barcelona, Spain	4th	19.97 m
1995	World Championships	Gothenburg, Sweden	21st (q)	18.50 m
1996	European Indoor Championships	Stockholm, Sweden	7th	19.50 m
1996	Olympic Games	Atlanta, United States	15th (q)	19.12 m
1997	World Indoor Championships	Paris, France	5th	20.37 m
1997	World Championships	Athens, Greece	12th (q)	19.61 m
1997	Universiade	Catania, Italy	7th	19.05 m
1998	European Indoor Championships	Valencia, Spain	6th	20.09 m
1998	Ibero-American Championships	Lisbon, Portugal	1st	19.47 m
1998	European Championships	Munich, Germany	7th	20.02 m
1999	World Indoor Championships	Maebashi, Japan	4th	20.79 m
2000	European Indoor Championships	Ghent, Belgium	2nd	20.38 m
2000	Ibero-American Championships	Rio de Janeiro, Brazil	1st	19.70 m
2000	Olympic Games	Sydney, Australia	6th	20.55 m
2001	World Indoor Championships	Lisbon, Portugal	3rd	20.67 m
2001	European Cup	Bremen, Germany	1st	21.03 m
2001	World Championships	Edmonton, Canada	4th	20.91 m
2001	Universiade	Beijing, China	1st	20.16 m
2001	Mediterranean Games	Radès, Tunisia	1st	21.03 m
2001	Goodwill Games	Brisbane, Australia	3rd	20.44 m
2002	European Indoor Championships	Vienna, Austria	1st	21.26 m
2002	European Championships	Munich, Germany	5th	20.45 m
2002	World Cup	Madrid, Spain	6th	19.76 m
2003	European Indoor Cup	Leipzig, Germany	2nd	19.60 m
2003	World Indoor Championships	Birmingham, United Kingdom	1st	21.24 m
2003	European Cup	Florence, Italy	1st	21.08 m
2003	World Championships	Paris, France	14th (q)	19.78 m
2003	World Athletics Final	Monte Carlo, Monaco	4th	20.32 m
2004	World Indoor Championships	Budapest, Hungary	5th	20.79 m
2004	Ibero-American Championships	Huelva, Spain	1st	20.59 m
2004	Olympic Games	Athens, Greece	3rd	20.84 m
2004	World Athletics Final	Monte Carlo, Monaco	3rd	20.67 m
2005	European Indoor Championships	Madrid, Spain	3rd	20.51 m
2005	European Cup	Florence, Italy	2nd	20.28 m
2005	Mediterranean Games	Almería, Spain	2nd	19.97 m
2005	World Championships	Helsinki, Finland	14th (q)	19.55 m
2006	European Indoor Cup	Liévin, France	3rd	20.09 m
2006	World Indoor Championships	Moscow, Russia	5th	20.43 m
2006	European Cup	Málaga, Spain	2nd	20.58 m
2006	European Championships	Gothenburg, Sweden	8th	19.68 m
2006	World Athletics Final	Stuttgart, Germany	8th	19.79 m
2007	European Indoor Championships	Birmingham, United Kingdom	14th (q)	18.73 m
2007	World Championships	Osaka, Japan	—	NM
2008	World Indoor Championships	Valencia, Spain	13th (q)	19.75 m
2008	Olympic Games	Beijing, China	19th (q)	19.81 m
2009	European Indoor Championships	Turin, Italy	6th	19.65 m
2009	European Team Championships	Leiria, Portugal	2nd	20.39 m
2009	Mediterranean Games	Pescara, Italy	1st	20.30 m
2009	World Championships	Berlin, Germany	18th (q)	19.80 m
2010	European Championships	Barcelona, Spain	23rd (q)	18.08 m
2011	European Indoor Championships	Paris, France	19th (q)	18.62 m
