= Michael Mertens =

German shot putter

Michael Mertens (born 27 December 1965 in Stelle, Lower Saxony) is a retired German shot putter.

He represented the sports clubs VfL Wolfsburg and LG Göttingen, and won silver medals at the German championships in 1997 and 2000.

His personal best throw was 20.24 metres, achieved in June 1998 in Iffezheim.

== Achievements ==
Year	Competition	Venue	Position	Notes
Representing Germany
1994	European Indoor Championships	Paris, France	12th	18.64 m
1996	European Indoor Championships	Stockholm, Sweden	11th	18.69 m
1996	Olympic Games	Atlanta, United States	16th (q)	19.07 m
1997	World Indoor Championships	Paris, France	13th (q)	19.43 m
1997	World Championships	Athens, Greece	8th	19.91 m
1998	European Indoor Championships	Valencia, Spain	8th	19.68 m
1998	European Championships	Budapest, Hungary	8th	19.67 m
1999	World Championships	Seville, Spain	19th (q)	19.37 m
2000	European Indoor Championships	Ghent, Belgium	7th	19.89 m
2000	Olympic Games	Sydney, Australia	26th (q)	18.72 m
