= 1988 World Junior Championships in Athletics – Men's shot put =

The men's shot put event at the 1988 World Junior Championships in Athletics was held in Sudbury, Ontario, Canada, at Laurentian University Stadium on 29 and 30 July. A 7257g (Senior implement) shot was used.

== Medalists ==
Gold	Aleksandr Klimenko; Soviet Union
Silver	Mike Stulce; United States
Bronze	Aleksandr Klimov; Soviet Union

== Results ==
=== Final ===
30 July

Rank	Name	Nationality	Attempts						Result	Notes
Rank	Name	Nationality	1	2	3	4	5	6	Result	Notes
1st place, gold medalist(s)	Aleksandr Klimenko	Soviet Union	17.32	18.33	13.30	17.33	18.17	18.92	18.92	
2nd place, silver medalist(s)	Mike Stulce	United States	17.89	17.70	x	18.47	17.77	x	18.47	
3rd place, bronze medalist(s)	Aleksandr Klimov	Soviet Union	18.06	17.90	x	17.58	17.59	17.67	18.06	
4	David Bultman	United States	17.10	16.93	16.72	17.50	x	16.92	17.50	
5	Matthew Simson	United Kingdom	16.87	17.11	16.51	17.04	x	x	17.11	
6	Dirk Urban	West Germany	x	15.65	16.84	16.36	16.91	16.76	16.91	
7	Mika Halvari	Finland	16.17	16.78	16.77	x	x	x	16.78	
8	Johan Svensson	Sweden	16.66	16.75	x	x	16.24	16.20	16.75	
9	Cui Guangyuan	China	16.64	16.68	15.89				16.68	
10	Victor Costello	Ireland	16.59	16.13	16.22				16.59	
11	Dariusz Kosinski	Poland	x	16.00	16.34				16.34	
12	Andreas Vlasny	Austria	15.86	15.60	15.77				15.86	

=== Qualifications ===
29 Jul

==== Group A ====
Rank	Name	Nationality	Attempts			Result	Notes
Rank	Name	Nationality	1	2	3	Result	Notes
1	Mike Stulce	United States	18.55	-	-	18.55	Q
2	Aleksandr Klimenko	Soviet Union	17.83	-	-	17.83	Q
3	Aleksandr Klimov	Soviet Union	17.14	-	-	17.14	Q
4	Matthew Simson	United Kingdom	16.78	-	-	16.78	Q
5	Cui Guangyuan	China	16.74	-	-	16.74	Q
6	Mika Halvari	Finland	16.65	-	-	16.65	Q
7	Victor Costello	Ireland	16.40	-	-	16.40	Q
8	Johan Svensson	Sweden	16.39	-	-	16.39	Q
9	David Bultman	United States	16.24	-	-	16.24	Q
10	Dariusz Kosinski	Poland	x	15.74	16.23	16.23	Q
11	Andreas Vlasny	Austria	15.56	x	16.16	16.16	Q
12	Dirk Urban	West Germany	16.13	-	-	16.13	Q
13	Carlos Fandiño	Cuba	15.83	15.93	x	15.93	
14	Paolo Dal Soglio	Italy	15.55	15.78	15.57	15.78	
15	Hussein Ali Al-Sayed	Kuwait	14.76	14.69	14.98	14.98	
16	Ramón Jiménez Gaona	Paraguay	14.73	x	14.36	14.73	
17	Ghufrain Hussein	Pakistan	14.25	14.49	14.57	14.57	

== Participation ==
According to an unofficial count, 17 athletes from 15 countries participated in the event.

- Austria (1)
- China (1)
- Cuba (1)
- Finland (1)
- Ireland (1)
- Italy (1)
- Kuwait (1)
- Pakistan (1)
- Paraguay (1)
- Poland (1)
- Soviet Union (2)
- Sweden (1)
- United Kingdom (1)
- United States (2)
- West Germany (1)
