= Virastyuk =

Virastyuk is a gender-neutral Ukrainian surname. Notable people with the surname include:

- Roman Virastyuk (1968–2019), Ukrainian shot putter
- Vasyl Virastyuk (born 1974), Ukrainian strength athlete, brother of Roman
