= Gheorghe Gușet =

Romanian shot putter (1968–2017)

Personal information
- Born: 28 May 1968 Zalău, Romania
- Died: 12 June 2017 (aged 49) Cluj Napoca, Romania
- Height: 1.85 m (6 ft 1 in)
- Weight: 118 kg (260 lb)

Sport
- Sport: Athletics
- Event: Shot put
- Club: CSM Armătura Zalău

Achievements and titles
- Personal best(s): 20.84 m (1999); 21.04 m (2006i)

Gheorghe Gușet (28 May 1968 – 12 June 2017) was a Romanian shot putter. He competed at the 1992, 2000 and 2004 Olympics and had his best result in 2004, aged 36 (14th place). Gușet was noted for being competitive in his late 30s, and set his all-time personal record aged 38, while most shot putters peak in their late 20s or early 30s. Due to health problems (chronic kidney disease) he was forced to retire from competitions in 2008. On 25 October 2008, a kidney transplantation was carried out successfully. Gușet died on 12 June 2017 in Cluj Napoca, Romania from an aortic dissection at the age of 49.

== Competition record ==
Representing Romania
Year	Competition	Venue	Position	Notes
1990	European Championships	Split, Yugoslavia	17th (q)	18.87 m
1991	World Indoor Championships	Seville, Spain	15th	18.07 m
1991	World Championships	Tokyo, Japan	14th (q)	18.55 m
1992	Olympic Games	Barcelona, Spain	17th (q)	18.96 m
1993	World Indoor Championships	Toronto, Canada	12th (q)	18.09 m
1993	World Championships	Stuttgart, Germany	19th (q)	18.95 m
1994	European Indoor Championships	Paris, France	15th (q)	18.47 m
1994	Jeux de la Francophonie	Évry, France	1st	19.67 m
1998	European Indoor Championships	Valencia, Spain	18th (q)	18.22 m
1998	European Championships	Budapest, Hungary	10th	18.87 m
1999	World Championships	Seville, Spain	18th (q)	19.46 m
2000	European Indoor Championships	Ghent, Belgium	4th	20.21 m
2000	Olympic Games	Sydney, Australia	30th (q)	18.56 m
2001	World Indoor Championships	Lisbon, Portugal	9th	19.68 m
2001	World Championships	Edmonton, Canada	14th (q)	19.74 m
2002	European Indoor Championships	Vienna, Austria	11th (q)	19.49 m
2002	European Championships	Munich, Germany	7th	20.05 m
2003	World Indoor Championships	Birmingham, United Kingdom	–	NM
2003	World Championships	Paris, France	13th (q)	19.83 m
2004	World Indoor Championships	Budapest, Hungary	–	NM
2004	Olympic Games	Athens, Greece	14th (q)	19.68 m
2005	European Indoor Championships	Madrid, Spain	5th	20.25 m
2005	World Championships	Helsinki, Finland	11th (q)	19.83 m
2006	World Indoor Championships	Moscow, Russia	4th	20.60 m
2006	European Championships	Gothenburg, Sweden	17th (q)	19.00 m
