= Kleiza =

Kleiza is a Lithuanian language surname. Notable people with the surname include:

- Linas Kleiza (born 1985), Lithuanian basketball player
- Saulius Kleiza (born 1964), Lithuanian shot putter and discus thrower
