= Brent Noon =

American shot putter

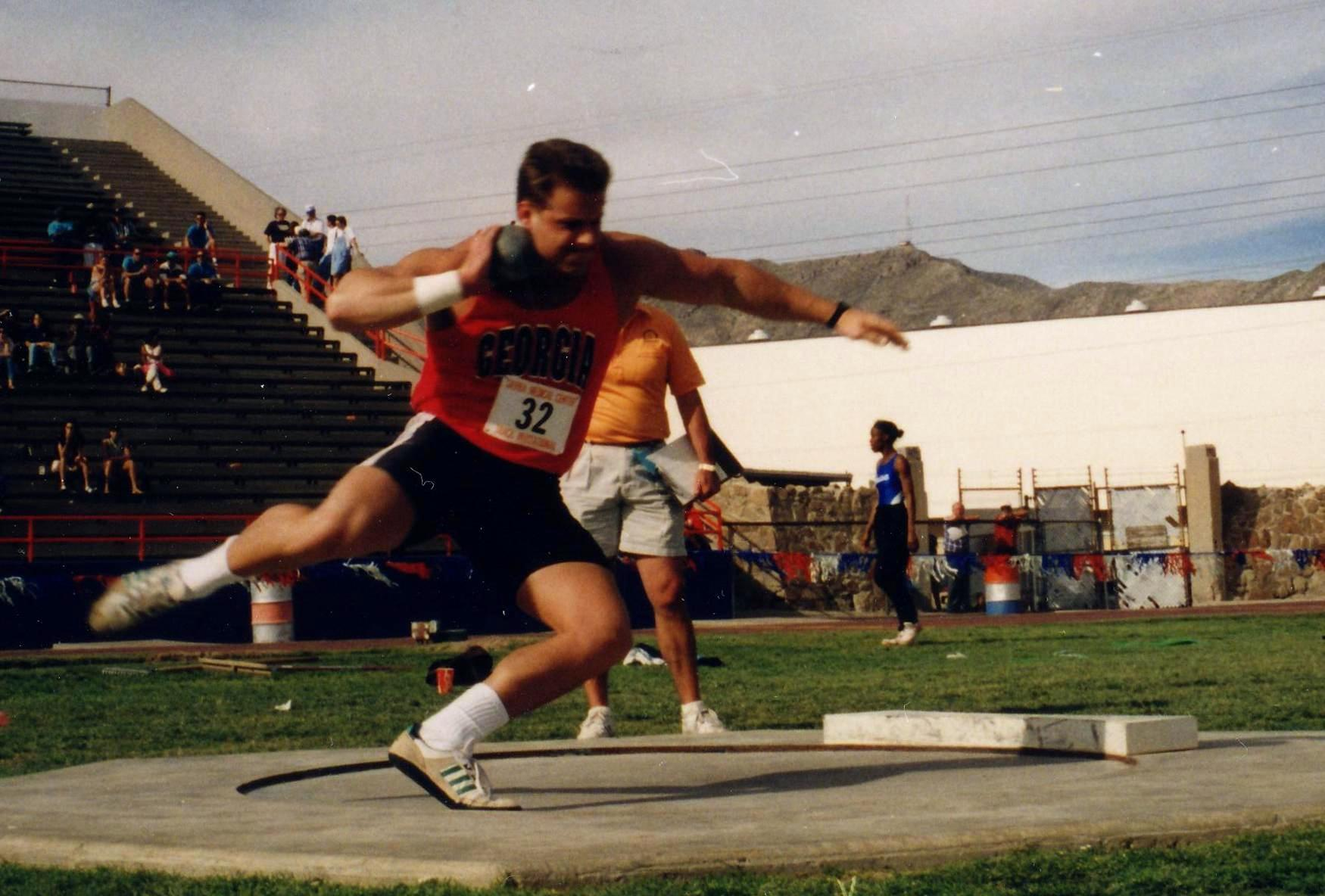
- Noon at the UTEP Sierra Medical invitational meet in 1994

Personal information
- Nationality: American
- Born: August 29, 1971 (age 54) Fallbrook, California, U.S.

Sport
- Country: United States
- Sport: Athletics
- Event: Shot put

Brent Noon (born August 29, 1971) is an inactive American Track and Field athlete, known primarily for throwing the Shot Put.

== Early life ==
While competing for Fallbrook Union High School, Noon recorded the second-best all-time outdoor mark in the shot put, the closest approach to Michael Carter's NFHS record. As a senior in 1990, Noon set the California High School record with a throw of 76'2" After taking a year off, he continued on to the University of Georgia where he won three straight NCAA Men's Outdoor Track and Field Championships. The University elected Noon to its "Circle of Honor" in 2009

== 1995 USA Outdoor Track and Field Championships ==
Noon won the 1995 USA Outdoor Track and Field Championships allowing him to compete for the United States at the 1995 World Championships in Athletics, where he finished 5th behind American teammates John Godina and Randy Barnes.

== Suspensions and bans ==
In 1992, Noon failed to show up at a USATF mandated drug test. For the offense of missing the test, he was suspended from competition for a 5-week period just before the Olympic Trials. Noon claimed the instructions were sent to his California address, even though he had moved to Georgia. While the suspension was reversed, Noon finished 9th at the trials and failed to make the Olympic team. He blamed mental anguish. In 1994, Noon won a $1 Million lawsuit against USATF. He also settled a civil defamation suit against UCLA and then assistant coach Art Venegas, who he claimed had spread rumors of Noon's steroid abuse prior to his high school performances. It was claimed the year off was related to an attempt to evade drug testing.

In 1996 another drug test revealed methandieone in Noon's sample and in 1997 he was banned from competition for four years, backdated to the 1996 test date.

== Personal life ==
Noon is married to Ali Noon (McKnight), 1995 NCAA Heptathlon runner-up, member of 1999/2000 U.S. Women's Bobsled team, IFBB Figure Pro, and University of Nevada (Reno) Hall of Fame Inductee (2006). They have two daughters.
