= 1992 World Junior Championships in Athletics – Men's shot put =

The men's shot put event at the 1992 World Junior Championships in Athletics was held in Seoul, South Korea, at Olympic Stadium on 18 and 19 September. A 7257g (Senior implement) shot was used.

== Medalists ==
Gold	Yuriy Belonog; Commonwealth of Independent States
Silver	Manuel Martínez; Spain
Bronze	Ralf Kahles; Germany

== Results ==
=== Final ===
19 September

Rank	Name	Nationality	Attempts						Result	Notes
Rank	Name	Nationality	1	2	3	4	5	6	Result	Notes
1st place, gold medalist(s)	Yuriy Belonog	Commonwealth of Independent States	18.46	17.49	x	x	17.95	x	18.46	
2nd place, silver medalist(s)	Manuel Martínez	Spain	16.71	17.54	x	18.07	x	18.14	18.14	
3rd place, bronze medalist(s)	Ralf Kahles	Germany	x	17.24	17.12	17.97	17.50	17.78	17.97	
4	Milan Haborák	Czechoslovakia	17.58	x	17.97	16.99	-	x	17.97	
5	Dennis Black	United States	17.61	17.05	x	x	17.56	17.81	17.81	
6	Elias Louka	Cyprus	17.37	17.62	x	17.15	x	x	17.62	
7	Yuriy Parkhomenko	Commonwealth of Independent States	17.25	x	17.09	17.48	17.04	16.97	17.48	
8	Martin Bílek	Czechoslovakia	x	16.29	17.20	x	17.00	x	17.20	
9	Andy Bloom	United States	16.14	17.18	16.94				17.18	
10	Wen Jili	China	16.95	16.39	16.79				16.95	
11	Arsi Harju	Finland	16.02	16.94	16.46				16.94	
12	Yoger Enrique Medina	Venezuela	x	16.71	x				16.71	
13	Leif Larsen	Norway	16.02	16.57	16.06				16.57	
14	Vladimir Vićentijević	FR Yugoslavia	x	15.88	16.07				16.07	
15	Burger Lambrechts	South Africa	x	15.66	15.94				15.66	

=== Qualifications ===
18 Sep

==== Group A ====
Rank	Name	Nationality	Attempts			Result	Notes
Rank	Name	Nationality	1	2	3	Result	Notes
1	Dennis Black	United States	x	17.36	-	17.36	Q
2	Ralf Kahles	Germany	17.20	-	-	17.20	Q
3	Milan Haborák	Czechoslovakia	15.91	17.02	-	17.02	Q
4	Yuriy Parkhomenko	Commonwealth of Independent States	16.81	-	-	16.81	Q
5	Leif Larsen	Norway	15.31	16.41	-	16.41	Q
6	Manuel Martínez	Spain	16.25	-	-	16.25	Q
7	Vladimir Vićentijević	FR Yugoslavia	15.75	16.14	16.20	16.20	Q
8	Frits Potgieter	South Africa	15.37	15.47	16.15	16.15	
9	Lambros Iacovou	Cyprus	15.82	15.66	15.89	15.89	
10	Samson Ahmadu	Nigeria	13.29	14.40	14.33	14.40	

==== Group B ====
Rank	Name	Nationality	Attempts			Result	Notes
Rank	Name	Nationality	1	2	3	Result	Notes
1	Yuriy Belonog	Commonwealth of Independent States	17.78	-	-	17.78	Q
2	Martin Bílek	Czechoslovakia	17.59	-	-	17.59	Q
3	Arsi Harju	Finland	16.91	-	-	16.91	Q
4	Burger Lambrechts	South Africa	16.81	-	-	16.81	Q
5	Andy Bloom	United States	16.74	-	-	16.74	Q
6	Elias Louka	Cyprus	16.71	-	-	16.71	Q
7	Wen Jili	China	16.66	-	-	16.66	Q
8	Yoger Enrique Medina	Venezuela	16.06	16.24	-	16.24	Q
9	Ramón Jeremias	Spain	x	16.01	x	16.01	
10	Stefan Pöhn	Germany	15.32	15.37	15.67	15.67	
11	Ian Winchester	New Zealand	13.64	14.39	x	14.39	

== Participation ==
According to an unofficial count, 21 athletes from 14 countries participated in the event.

- China (1)
- Commonwealth of Independent States (2)
- Cyprus (2)
- Czechoslovakia (2)
- Finland (1)
- Germany (2)
- New Zealand (1)
- Nigeria (1)
- Norway (1)
- South Africa (2)
- Spain (2)
- United States (2)
- Venezuela (1)
- FR Yugoslavia (1)
