= Mark Proctor (shot putter) =

English athlete

Personal information
- Nationality: British (English)
- Born: 15 January 1963 (age 62) Wenhaston, Suffolk, England
- Height: 193 cm (6 ft 4 in)
- Weight: 131 kg (289 lb)

Sport
- Sport: Athletics
- Event: Shot put
- Club: Newham and Essex Beagles

Mark Anthony Proctor (born 15 January 1963) is a male former athlete who competed in the 2000 Summer Olympics.

== Biography ==
Proctor, born in Wenhaston, Suffolk, represented England in the shot put event, at the 1998 Commonwealth Games in Kuala Lumpur, Malaysia. He then appeared at the next two Commonwealth Games in 2002 and 2006.

Proctor was five-times British shot put champion after winning the British AAA Championships title in 1995, 1998, 1999, 2001 and 2002.

== Competition record ==
Year	Competition	Venue	Position	Event	Notes
Representing Great Britain and England
1995	World Championships	Gothenburg, Sweden	25th (q)	Shot put	18.08 m
1996	European Indoor Championships	Stockholm, Sweden	12th	Shot put	18.53 m
1997	World Indoor Championships	Paris, France	15th (q)	Shot put	19.21 m
1997	World Championships	Athens, Greece	29th (q)	Shot put	17.99 m
1998	European Indoor Championships	Valencia, Spain	15th (q)	Shot put	18.66 m
1998	European Championships	Budapest, Hungary	–	Shot put	NM
1998	Commonwealth Games	Kuala Lumpur, Malaysia	10th	Shot put	19.15 m
1999	World Championships	Seville, Spain	14th (q)	Shot put	19.63 m
2000	European Indoor Championships	Ghent, Belgium	9th (q)	Shot put	19.42 m
2000	Olympic Games	Sydney, Australia	31st (q)	Shot put	18.49 m
2001	World Championships	Edmonton, Canada	30th (q)	Shot put	17.75 m
2002	Commonwealth Games	Manchester, United Kingdom	7th	Shot put	18.08 m
2006	Commonwealth Games	Melbourne, Australia	8th	Shot put	17.59 m
