= Athletics at the 1987 Summer Universiade – Men's shot put =

The men's shot put event at the 1987 Summer Universiade was held at the Stadion Maksimir in Zagreb on 19 July 1987.

== Results ==
Rank	Athlete	Nationality	Result	Notes
1st place, gold medalist(s)	Klaus Görmer	East Germany	20.38	
2nd place, silver medalist(s)	Vladimir Yaryshkin	Soviet Union	20.12	
3rd place, bronze medalist(s)	Ron Backes	United States	20.09	
4	Oliver-Sven Buder	East Germany	19.66	
5	Ventislav Khristov	Bulgaria	19.33	
6	Zsigmond Ladányi	Hungary	18.94	
7	Dragan Perić	Yugoslavia	18.86	
8	Karel Šula	Czechoslovakia	18.55	
9	Garry Frank	United States	17.37	
10	John McNamara	Australia	15.99	
11	José Alonso	Guatemala	13.99	
12	Jorge Coronel	Ecuador	13.00	
13	Emad Kamel Mansour	Sudan	9.74	
	Saulius Kleiza	Soviet Union	NM	
