= Aleksey Shidlovsky =

Russian shot putter

Personal information
- Nationality: Russian
- Born: 19 November 1972 (age 52)

Sport
- Sport: Athletics
- Event: Shot put

Aleksey Shidlovsky (born 19 November 1972) is a Russian track and field athlete. He competed in the men's shot put at the 1996 Summer Olympics.
