= 1990 World Junior Championships in Athletics – Men's discus throw =

The men's discus throw event at the 1990 World Junior Championships in Athletics was held in Plovdiv, Bulgaria, at Deveti Septemvri Stadium on 8 and 9 August. A 2 kg (senior implement) discus was used.

== Medalists ==
Gold	Ivan Iliev; Bulgaria
Silver	Frank Bicet; Cuba
Bronze	Jan Engelmann; East Germany

== Results ==
=== Final ===
9 August

Rank	Name	Nationality	Attempts						Result	Notes
Rank	Name	Nationality	1	2	3	4	5	6	Result	Notes
1st place, gold medalist(s)	Ivan Iliev	Bulgaria	52.34	56.26	57.64	x	58.28	57.84	58.28	
2nd place, silver medalist(s)	Frank Bicet	Cuba	55.30	x	x	57.10	55.88	53.30	57.10	
3rd place, bronze medalist(s)	Jan Engelmann	East Germany	54.20	56.02	x	56.82	55.32	56.56	56.82	
4	Anton Ellanskiy	Soviet Union	56.04	55.86	56.56	55.56	52.52	55.86	56.56	
5	Gennadiy Barsegyan	Soviet Union	x	53.78	52.48	54.90	x	x	54.90	
6	Jaroslav Žitnanský	Czechoslovakia	x	52.22	51.04	52.82	51.96	54.40	54.40	
7	Miroslav Menc	Czechoslovakia	51.40	52.32	51.12	49.96	53.28	x	53.28	
8	Alessandro Urlando	Italy	44.94	43.72	51.84	x	50.34	51.78	51.84	
9	Johannes Kerälä	Finland	49.86	x	50.02				50.02	
10	Markus Tschiers	West Germany	47.74	48.00	48.86				48.86	
11	Courtney Ireland	New Zealand	48.22	48.82	x				48.82	
12	Jörg Herwig	East Germany	48.46	x	x				48.46	

=== Qualifications ===
8 Aug

==== Group A ====
Rank	Name	Nationality	Attempts			Result	Notes
Rank	Name	Nationality	1	2	3	Result	Notes
1	Ivan Iliev	Bulgaria	54.62	-	-	54.62	Q
2	Gennadiy Barsegyan	Soviet Union	54.34	-	-	54.34	Q
3	Jan Engelmann	East Germany	54.14	-	-	54.14	Q
4	Frank Bicet	Cuba	53.90	-	-	53.90	Q
5	Anton Ellanskiy	Soviet Union	48.18	52.80	-	52.80	Q
6	Jaroslav Žitnanský	Czechoslovakia	52.28	-	-	52.58	Q
7	Miroslav Menc	Czechoslovakia	43.46	50.86	50.02	50.86	q
8	Jörg Herwig	East Germany	50.26	x	48.24	50.23	q
9	Courtney Ireland	New Zealand	49.04	48.62	50.06	50.06	q
10	Johannes Kerälä	Finland	50.00	48.78	x	50.00	q
11	Markus Tschiers	West Germany	49.72	43.28	x	49.72	q
12	Alessandro Urlando	Italy	39.94	47.70	49.62	49.62	q
13	Lee Andrews	Canada	x	49.16	46.44	49.16	
14	Jo Van Daele	Belgium	49.12	47.68	48.42	49.12	
15	Arpad Konyi	Hungary	x	x	48.54	48.54	
16	Christophe Dutournier	France	47.58	48.06	x	48.06	
17	Glen Smith	United Kingdom	47.56	47.68	47.02	47.68	
18	Stephen Dwight	Australia	44.92	47.00	47.34	47.34	
19	Nikola Georgiev	Bulgaria	x	x	47.16	47.16	
20	John Godina	United States	x	40.88	x	40.88	
21	Bahadur Singh Sagoo	India	x	40.12	39.24	40.12	

== Participation ==
According to an unofficial count, 21 athletes from 17 countries participated in the event.

- Australia (1)
- Belgium (1)
- Bulgaria (2)
- Canada (1)
- Cuba (1)
- Czechoslovakia (2)
- East Germany (2)
- Finland (1)
- France (1)
- Hungary (1)
- India (1)
- Italy (1)
- New Zealand (1)
- Soviet Union (2)
- United Kingdom (1)
- United States (1)
- West Germany (1)
