= Athletics at the 1994 Commonwealth Games – Men's discus throw =

Men's discus throw at the Commonwealth Games

The men's discus throw event at the 1994 Commonwealth Games was held on 26 August at the Centennial Stadium in Victoria, British Columbia.

== Results ==
Rank	Name	Nationality	#1	#2	#3	#4	#5	#6	Result	Notes
1st place, gold medalist(s)	Werner Reiterer	Australia	61.06	60.34	62.76				62.76	
2nd place, silver medalist(s)	Adewale Olukoju	Nigeria	61.98	x	61.08	x	62.46	62.46	62.46	
3rd place, bronze medalist(s)	Robert Weir	England	57.56	x	60.82	x	60.86		60.86	
4	Martin Swart	South Africa							56.42	
5	Frits Potgieter	South Africa							56.10	
6	Glen Smith	England							55.84	
7	Raymond Lazdins	Canada							55.60	
8	Darrin Morris	Scotland	53.08						54.98	
9	Bradley Cooper	Bahamas	53.44						54.22	
10	Kevin Brown	England	50.96						54.06	
11	Richard Misterowicz	Canada							52.28	
12	Alex Stanat	Canada	51.88						51.90	
13	Muhammad Javed	Pakistan							50.30	
	Courtney Ireland	New Zealand							DNS	
	Chima Ugwu	Nigeria							DNS	
