= Bo Grahn =

Finnish athlete (1947–2018)

Personal information
- Nationality: Finnish
- Born: 6 October 1947 Porvoo, Finland
- Died: 16 July 2018 (aged 70) Vantaa, Finland

Sport
- Sport: Athletics
- Event: Shot put

Bo Henning Lennart Grahn (6 October 1947 – 16 July 2018) was a Finnish athlete. He represented Borgå Akilles until 1968, after which he transferred to Esbo Idrottsförening.

At the 1966 European Junior Games in Odessa, Grahn placed fourth. Six years later, he competed in the men's shot put at the 1972 Summer Olympics. Grahn was the third shotputter to be accepted into the 20 metre club thanks to his put of 20.09 m in Helsinki on 3 August 1972.
