= 20 meter club =

The 20 meter club (20 metrin kerho in Finnish) is an unregistered Finnish association for Finnish shot putters who have put the shot more than 20 meters (66 ft) in an official competition using a 7.26 kg (16.0 lb) shot for men and a 4 kg (8.8 lb) for women.

The 20 meter club was founded on April 28, 1983, at Eerikkilä Sports Academy with six men being selected as members. One of the goals of the club is to promote the development of shot putting in Finland.

The club meets twice a year, once in the spring and once in the fall. In its fall meeting, the club awards the "Kultapoju" or Golden Boy to a promising shot putter. The Golden Boy is a brass shot that is slightly larger than the current standard shot, although it weighs less (6.2 kg (14 lb), orig. 6.6 kg (15 lb)). The first recipient of the Golden Boy award was Kari Töyrylä in 1985; Töyrylä became a member of the club in 1986 after his put of 20.05 m (65.8 ft) on July 2, 1986. The last recipient to date was Niko Hauhia, who also received a EUR 500 stipend for training. The club also awards training grants in order to promote and help athletes develop.

== Members ==
As of July 2018, the club had 21 members.

=== Members of the club and the first time they put the shot more than 20 m ===
	Name	Distance	Date	Location
1.	Seppo Simola	20.15	July 19, 1972	Turku, Finland
2.	Matti Yrjölä	20.04	August 2, 1972	Hämeenkyrö, Finland
3.	Bo Grahn	20.09	August 3, 1972	Helsinki, Finland
4.	Reijo Ståhlberg	20.38	July 26, 1973	Turku, Finland
5.	Markku Tuokko	20.03	August 18, 1979	Mikkeli, Finland
6.	Aulis Akonniemi	20.12	July 25, 1982	Ähtäri, Finland
7.	Janne Ronkainen	20.02	May 11, 1986	Leselidse, Soviet Union
8.	Jari Kuoppa	20.17	June 12, 1986	Ähtäri, Finland
9.	Kari Töyrylä	20.05	July 2, 1986	Kauhajoki, Finland
10.	Markus Koistinen	20.31	June 13, 1993	Luumäki, Finland
11.	Mika Halvari	20.08	August 4, 1993	Kotka, Finland
12.	Arsi Harju	20.16	March 2, 1997	Tampere, Finland
13.	Timo Aaltonen	20.12	June 20, 1998	Kuortane, Finland
14.	Jani Illikainen	20.43	January 23, 1999	Haparanda, Sweden
15.	Ville Tiisanoja	20.06	July 31, 1999	Espoo, Finland
16.	Jarkko Haukijärvi	20.20	July 1, 2000	Eurajoki, Finland
17.	Tepa Reinikainen	20.01	February 13, 2000	Kuopio, Finland
18.	Conny Karlsson	20.45	May 31, 2001	Espoo, Finland
19.	Robert Häggblom	20.13	May 20, 2006	Halle, Germany
20.	Mika Vasara	20.04	June 4, 2006	Leppävirta, Finland
21.	Arttu Kangas	20.09	February 22, 2015	Tampere, Finland
