= Mika Halvari =

Finnish shot putter (born 1970)

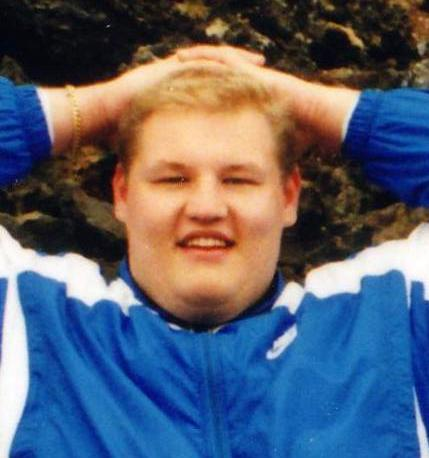
Mika Kristian Halvari in 1994

Mika Kristian Halvari (born February 13, 1970, in Kemi) is a Finnish former shot putter. When competing, he represented Kemin Kunto and Helsingin Kisa-Veikot.

Halvari won the 1995 IAAF World Indoor Championships in Barcelona, Spain and came in second in the World Championships in Athletics in Gothenburg, Sweden the same year. In 1998, he won a silver medal at the 1998 European Indoor Athletics Championships held in Valencia, Spain. In addition to his success internationally, Halvari has won 4 gold medals, 3 silver and 1 bronze in the Finnish Championships.

Towards the end of his career, Halvari was injured numerous times; for example, his Achilles tendon snapped twice.

His personal best outdoors is 21.50 metres, which he put on July 9, 1995 in Hämeenkyrö, Finland. Indoors, he still holds the Nordic record for his put of 22.09 m, which he achieved on February 7, 2000 in Tampere, Finland.

Halvari was the 11th shotputter accepted into the 20 meter club.

== Major achievements ==
Year	Competition	Venue	Position	Notes
Representing Finland
1988	World Junior Championships	Sudbury, Canada	7th	16.78 m
1989	European Junior Championships	Varaždin, Yugoslavia	5th	17.96 m
1993	World Championships	Stuttgart, Germany	25th (q)	18.19 m
1994	European Indoor Championships	Paris, France	8th	19.48 m
1994	European Championships	Helsinki, Finland	4th	19.52 m
1995	World Indoor Championships	Barcelona, Spain	1st	20.74 m
1995	World Championships	Gothenburg, Sweden	2nd	20.93 m
1996	Olympic Games	Atlanta, United States	14th (q)	19.37 m
1997	World Indoor Championships	Paris, France	6th	20.22 m
1997	World Championships	Athens, Greece	5th	20.13 m
1998	European Indoor Championships	Valencia, Spain	2nd	20.59 m
1998	European Championships	Budapest, Hungary	6th	20.33 m
1999	World Championships	Sevilla, Spain	16th (q)	19.61 m
2000	European Indoor Championships	Ghent, Belgium	–	NM
