= Mikhalis Louka =

Cypriot shot putter (born 1970)

Personal information
- Born: 23 February 1970 (age 56)

Sport
- Sport: Track and field
Medal record
Representing Cyprus
Commonwealth Games
Silver medal – second place	1998 Kuala Lumpur	Shot put

Mikhalis Louka (Greek: Μιχάλης Λουκά, born 23 February 1970) is a retired Cypriot shot putter. His brother Ilias Louka was also a shot putter.

He won the silver medal at the 1998 Commonwealth Games. He also competed at the 1996 Olympic Games and the 1999 World Championships without reaching the final. He became visiting Greek shot put champion in 1990 and 1999, and Greek indoor champion in 2001.

His personal best throw was 19.70 metres, achieved in April 1996 in Nicosia. This is the Cypriot record.
