= Ilias Louka =

Cypriot shot putter (born 1974)

Ilias Louka (Greek: Ηλίας Λουκά, born 23 July 1974) is a retired Cypriot shot putter. His brother Mikhalis Louka was also a shot putter.

He finished sixth at the 1992 World Junior Championships and won the silver medal at the 1993 European Junior Championships. He competed at the 1996 Olympic Games without reaching the final. He became visiting Greek shot put champion in 1993 and 1996.

His personal best throw was 19.54 metres, achieved in 1996.
