= Mike Stulce =

American shot putter (born 1969)

Personal information
- Born: July 14, 1969 (age 57) Killeen, Texas, U.S.

Sport
- Sport: Athletics
- Event: Shot put
- Coached by: Robert Parker
Medal record
Men's athletics
Representing the United States
Olympic Games
Gold medal – first place	1992 Barcelona	Shot put
World Indoor Championships
Gold medal – first place	1993 Toronto	Shot put
Summer Universiade
Silver medal – second place	1989 Duisburg	Shot put

Michael Stulce (born July 14, 1969) is a retired American shot putter who was an outstanding athlete at Texas A&M University. While at A&M, he worked with throws coach Robert Parker. He won the gold medal at the 1992 Summer Olympics in Barcelona, Spain. He is also three times national champion. In 1993 he won the U.S. National shot put Championships.

Stulce had returned from a 1990 two-year doping ban just in time to win the gold medal at the Barcelona Olympics.

He subsequently failed another doping test at the 1993 World Outdoor Championships and received a life ban.
