= Saulius Kleiza =

Lithuanian athlete (born 1964)

Personal information
- Born: April 2, 1964 (age 62) Kaunas, Soviet Union

Sport
- Sport: Track and field

Saulius Kleiza (born April 2, 1964) is a retired shot putter and discus thrower from Lithuania, who competed for his native country at two consecutive Summer Olympics, starting in 1996. His personal best in the shot put event is 20.91 metres, thrown on 13 May 1987 in Leselidze.

== Achievements ==
Year	Competition	Venue	Position	Notes
Representing the Soviet Union
1987	Universiade	Zagreb, Yugoslavia	–	NM
Representing Lithuania
1994	Goodwill Games	St. Petersburg, Russia	4th	19.44 m
1994	European Championships	Helsinki, Finland	10th	18.80 m
1995	World Indoor Championships	Barcelona, Spain	13th	18.41 m
1995	World Championships	Gothenburg, Sweden	13th	18.99 m
1996	Olympic Games	Atlanta, United States	30th	18.21 m
1997	World Championships	Athens, Greece	11th	18.25 m
1998	European Championships	Budapest, Hungary	20th (q)	18.57 m
1999	World Championships	Sevilla, Spain	10th	19.01 m
2000	Olympic Games	Sydney, Australia	28th	18.59 m
