= Sergey Kot =

Uzbekistani athlete (born 1960)

Personal information
- Nationality: Uzbekistani
- Born: 7 January 1960 (age 66)

Sport
- Sport: Athletics
- Event: Shot put
Medal record
Men's athletics
Representing Uzbekistan
Asian Championships
Silver medal – second place	1993 Manila	Discus throw
Bronze medal – third place	1993 Manila	Shot put

Sergey Kot (born 7 January 1960) is an Uzbekistani athlete. He competed in the men's shot put at the 1996 Summer Olympics.
