= Miroslav Menc =

Czech shot putter (born 1971)

Personal information
- Born: 16 March 1971 (age 55) Rumburk, Czechoslovakia

Sport
- Sport: Track and field
Medal record
Representing Czech Republic
European Indoor Championships
Bronze medal – third place	2000 Ghent	Shot put

Miroslav Menc (born 16 March 1971) is a Czech shot putter, whose personal best put is 20.64 metres, achieved in September 2000 in Ostrava. He has an indoor personal best of 20.68 metres

In 1998 he received a two-year suspension from the IAAF after testing positive for stanozolol at a meet in Athens. He was disqualified from the 1998 European Indoor Championships. In 2001 he tested positive for norandrosterone, and became the first Czech athlete to receive a life ban.

== International competitions ==
Year	Competition	Venue	Position	Event	Notes
Representing Czechoslovakia
1990	World Junior Championships	Plovdiv, Bulgaria	14th (q)	Shot put	16.05 m
1990	World Junior Championships	Plovdiv, Bulgaria	7th	Discus throw	53.28 m
1993	Universiade	Buffalo, United States	8th	Shot put	18.45 m
Representing the Czech Republic
1995	Universiade	Fukuoka, Japan	4th	Shot put	18.82 m
1995	World Championships	Gothenburg, Sweden	14th (q)	Shot put	17.54 m
1996	Olympic Games	Atlanta, United States	21st	Shot put	18.69 m
1997	World Indoor Championships	Paris, France	9th	Shot put	19.66 m
1997	Universiade	Catania, Italy	5th	Shot put	19.53 m
1997	World Championships	Athens, Greece	9th (q)	Shot put	19.23 m
2000	European Indoor Championships	Ghent, Belgium	3rd	Shot put	20.23 m
2000	Olympic Games	Sydney, Australia	10th	Shot put	19.39 m
2001	World Indoor Championships	Lisbon, Portugal	6th	Shot put	20.08 m

== See also ==
- List of sportspeople sanctioned for doping offences
