= Viktor Bulat =

Belarusian shot putter

Personal information
- Nationality: Belarusian
- Born: 1 April 1971 (age 55) Kunya, Pskov Oblast, Soviet Union

Sport
- Sport: Athletics
- Event: Shot put
Medal record
Representing Belarus
Summer Universiade
Silver medal – second place	1995 Fukuoka	Shot put
World U20 Championships
Gold medal – first place	1990 Plovdiv	Shot put

Viktor Bulat (born 1 April 1971) is a Belarusian athlete. He competed in the men's shot put at the 1996 Summer Olympics.
