= Roman Virastyuk =

Ukrainian shot putter (1968–2019)

Personal information
- Native name: Роман Ярославович Вірастюк
- Full name: Roman Yaroslavovych Virastyuk
- Born: 20 April 1968 Ivano Frankivsk, Ukrainian SSR, Soviet Union
- Died: 27 July 2019 (aged 51) Kyiv, Ukraine
- Height: 189 cm (6 ft 2 in)
- Weight: 135 kg (298 lb)

Sport
- Country: Ukraine
- Sport: Athletics
- Event: Shot put

Achievements and titles
- Personal best: 21.34 m (2000)
Medal record
Men's Athletics
Representing Ukraine
European Championships
Bronze medal – third place	1994 Helsinki	Shot put

Roman Yaroslavovych Virastyuk (Ukrainian: Роман Ярославович Вірастюк; 20 April 1968 – 27 July 2019) was a Ukrainian shot putter.

== Career ==
He won the bronze medal at the 1994 European Athletics Championships and the sixth place at the 1996 Olympic Games. His personal best was 21.34 metres, achieved in May 2000 in Ivano-Frankivsk. He was a brother of Vasyl Virastyuk.

== International competitions ==
Year	Competition	Venue	Position	Notes
Representing Ukraine
1994	European Indoor Championships	Paris, France	11th	18.70 m
1994	European Championships	Helsinki, Finland	3rd	19.59 m
1995	World Championships	Gothenburg, Sweden	7th	19.66 m
1995	Military World Games	Rome, Italy	2nd	18.73 m
1996	Olympic Games	Atlanta, United States	6th	20.45 m
1997	World Championships	Athens, Greece	6th	20.12 m
1998	European Indoor Championships	Valencia, Spain	5th	20.21 m
1999	Military World Games	Zagreb, Croatia	2nd	19.90 m
2000	European Indoor Championships	Ghent, Belgium	5th	20.07 m
2001	World Indoor Championships	Lisbon, Portugal	12th	19.55 m
2002	European Championships	Munich, Germany	9th	19.52 m
2003	World Championships	Paris, France	9th	19.61 m
2003	Military World Games	Catania, Italy	2nd	19.30 m
