= Oliver-Sven Buder =

German shot putter

Personal information
- Born: 23 June 1966 (age 60) Steinheidel-Erlabrunn, Bezirk Karl-Marx-Stadt, East Germany
- Height: 200 cm (6 ft 7 in)
- Weight: 130 kg (287 lb)

Sport
- Sport: Athletics
- Event: Shot put
- Club: SC Karl-Marx-Stadt; TV Wattenscheid

Achievements and titles
- Personal best: 21.42 m (1998)
Medal record
Men's athletics
Representing Germany
World Championships
Silver medal – second place	1997 Athens	Shot put
Silver medal – second place	1999 Seville	Shot put
European Championships
Silver medal – second place	1998 Budapest	Shot put
Representing East Germany
European Championships
Silver medal – second place	1990 Split	Shot put

Oliver-Sven Buder (born 23 June 1966 in Steinheidel-Erlabrunn, Bezirk Karl-Marx-Stadt) is a German track and field athlete, who in the 1990s belonged to the best shot-putters in the world. The high point of his career came at the World Championships in 1997 and 1999 where he won the silver medal. Until 1990 he represented East Germany.

Buder grew up in Niederlungwitz in Saxony. He began as a child in track and field and as his talent emerged he was sent to the children and youth sport school in Karl-Marx-Stadt (later Chemnitz).

He represented the Karl-Marx-Stadt sport club (later Chemnitz sport club). After the reunification of Germany he switched to TV Wattenscheid (trainer: Guenter Stolz, Miroslav Jasinski), in 2001 he went to the MTV Ingolstadt (trainer: Joachim Lipske). While he was active he was 2.00 meters tall and weighed 125 kg.

In 1986 he began studying engineering, but after the fall of East Germany he stopped. Later he began schooling to work in a bank but then changed to industrial buyer. He is married. In 2003 he ended his career after having taken a long break due to injury.

== International competitions ==
Year	Competition	Venue	Position	Event	Notes
Representing East Germany
1985	European Junior Championships	Cottbus, East Germany	1st	Shot put	19.34 m
1987	Universiade	Zagreb, Yugoslavia	4th	Shot put	19.66 m
1989	Universiade	Duisburg, West Germany	7th	Shot put	19.13 m
1990	European Championships	Split, Yugoslavia	2nd	Shot put	21.01 m
Representing Germany
1991	World Championships	Tokyo, Japan	4th	Shot put	20.10 m
1993	World Championships	Stuttgart, Germany	7th	Shot put	19.74 m
1994	European Championships	Helsinki, Finland	16th (q)	Shot put	18.41 m
1995	World Championships	Gothenburg, Sweden	6th	Shot put	20.11 m
1996	Olympic Games	Atlanta, United States	5th	Shot put	20.51 m
1997	World Championships	Athens, Greece	2nd	Shot put	21.24 m
1998	European Championships	Budapest, Hungary	2nd	Shot put	20.98 m
1999	World Championships	Seville, Spain	2nd	Shot put	21.42 m
2000	Olympic Games	Sydney, Australia	8th	Shot put	20.18 m
2001	World Championships	Edmonton, Canada	21st (q)	Shot put	18.89 m
