= Randy Barnes =

American shot putter (born 1966)

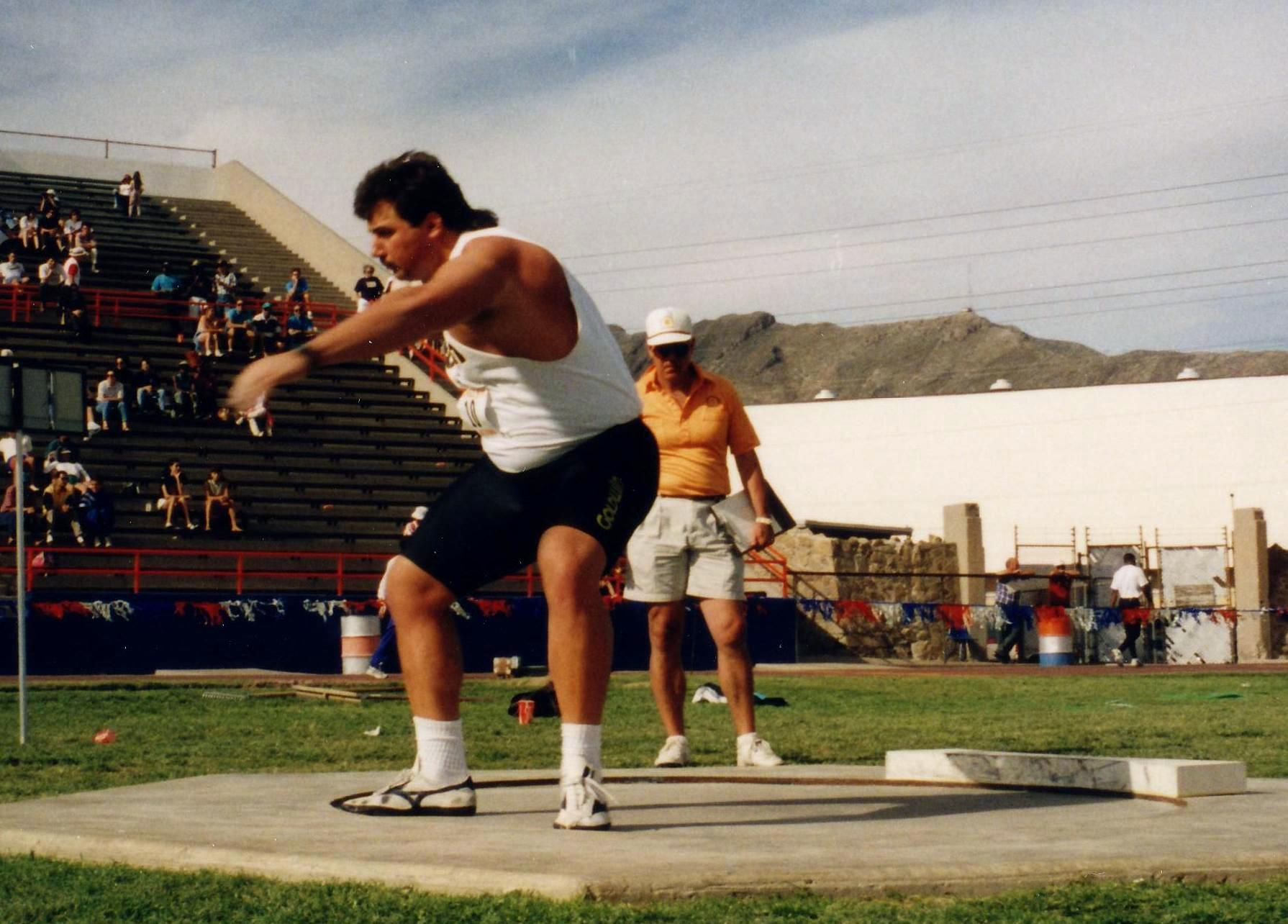
- Barnes (front) at the UTEP Sierra Medical invitational meet in 1994

Personal information
- Full name: Eric Randolph Barnes
- Nationality: American
- Born: June 16, 1966 (age 60) Charleston, West Virginia, U.S.
- Height: 6 ft 5 in (1.95 m)
- Weight: 291 lb (132 kg)

Sport
- Country: United States
- Sport: Athletics
- Event: Shot put
- Coached by: Robert Parker

Achievements and titles
- Personal best: 23.12 m (1990)
Medal record
Men's athletics
Representing United States
Olympic Games
| Gold medal – first place | 1996 Atlanta | Shot put |
| Silver medal – second place | 1988 Seoul | Shot put |
World Championships
| Silver medal – second place | 1993 Stuttgart | Shot put |
| Bronze medal – third place | 1995 Gothenburg | Shot put |

Eric Randolph Barnes (born June 16, 1966) is an American former shot putter who held the outdoor world record for the event from 1990 to 2021. He won silver at the 1988 Olympics and gold at the 1996 Olympics. Only three throwers have been within 40 centimetres (16 in) of his outdoor world record since it was set.

== Biography ==
Barnes was born in Charleston, West Virginia, grew up in nearby St. Albans, and began putting the shot in high school. In 1985, he put an impressive 20.36 metres (66.8 ft) with the prep shot of 5.4 kilograms (12 lb). After graduating from St. Albans High School in 1985, he attended Texas A&M University where he broke school records (set by Randy Matson) with a put of 21.88 metres (71.8 ft) with the 7.26 kilograms (16.0 lb) full size shot. While at A&M, Randy worked with hall of famer conditioning coach Istvan Javorek and throws coach Robert Parker.

He went to the 1988 Summer Olympics in Seoul, where he put 22.39 metres (73.5 ft) and earned a silver medal at only 22. He came second to Ulf Timmermann of East Germany, who put 22.47 metres (73.7 ft) at the height of East German doping dominance. On January 20, 1989, he set a new indoor world record at the Sunkist Invitational in Los Angeles with a put of 22.66 metres (74.3 ft), which was better than his outdoor personal best at the time.

On May 20, 1990, he broke Ulf Timmermann's outdoor record with a put of 23.12 m (75 ft 10 in). Six days later Timmermann almost matched his world record, throwing 23.10 m (75 ft 9 1/4 in) at the Bruce Jenner Invitational in San Jose. Barnes was banned from competing for 27 months after testing positive for the anabolic steroid methyltestosterone at a competition in Malmö, Sweden, on August 7 that same year. He sued to have the suspension overturned but lost. Due to the suspension, he was unable to compete in the 1992 Olympics.

At the 1996 Olympic Games, Barnes won the gold medal that eluded him 8 years earlier with a come-from-behind 21.62 metres (70.9 ft) put on his final attempt. In 1998, he tested positive for androstenedione, an over-the-counter supplement (famously used by baseball player Mark McGwire) that is banned in track and field. Although Barnes claimed he did not know androsten was banned, he was suspended from competition for life.

Barnes later became a long driving competitor, competing to hit a golf ball as far as possible; he qualified for the 2005 World Long Drive Championship.

Records
| Preceded by (East Germany) Ulf Timmermann | Men's shot put world record holder May 20, 1990 – June 18, 2021 | Succeeded by (United States) Ryan Crouser |
