= Oleksandr Bagach =

Ukrainian shot putter (born 1966)

Personal information
- Born: 21 November 1966 (age 59) Matusiv, Shpola Raion, Cherkasy Oblast, Ukrainian SSR, Soviet Union
Medal record
Men's Athletics
Representing Ukraine
Olympic Games
Bronze medal – third place	1996 Atlanta	Shot put
World Championships
Bronze medal – third place	1993 Stuttgart	Shot put
Disqualified	1997 Athens	Shot put
Bronze medal – third place	1999 Seville	Shot put
World Indoor Championships
Gold medal – first place	1999 Maebashi	Shot put
Silver medal – second place	1997 Paris	Shot put
Bronze medal – third place	1993 Toronto	Shot put
European Athletics Championships
Gold medal – first place	1998 Budapest	Shot put
Bronze medal – third place	1994 Helsinki	Shot put
European Indoor Championships
Gold medal – first place	1994 Paris	Shot put
Military World Games
Gold medal – first place	1995 Rome	Shot put
IAAF World Cup
Silver medal – second place	1998 Johannesburg	Shot put
European Cup
Gold medal – first place	1993 Rome	Shot put
Gold medal – first place	1995 Villeneuve d'Ascq	Shot put
Representing the Unified Team
European Indoor Championships
Gold medal – first place	1992 Genoa	Shot put
Representing Soviet Union
European Athletics U20 Championships
Silver medal – second place	1985 Cottbus	Shot put

Oleksandr Bahach (Ukrainian: Олександр Багач) born 21 November 1966 in Matusiv) is a retired Ukrainian shot putter, an athlete of the Central Sports Club of the Armed Forces of Ukraine.

During his career he won bronze medals at the Olympic Games and World Championships. Having originally won the gold medal at the 1997 World Championships, he failed a drug test for ephedrine and lost the medal. He had previously served a two-year suspension after testing positive for testosterone in 1989.

== Career ==
- Summer Olympic Games:
  - 1996 Atlanta - bronze
- World Championships:
  - 1993 Stuttgart - bronze
  - 1999 Seville - bronze
- European Championships:
  - 1994 Helsinki - bronze
  - 1998 Budapest - gold
- European Indoor Championships:
  - 1992 Genoa - gold
  - 1994 Paris - gold

== See also ==
- List of doping cases in sport
