= Dzimitry Hancharuk =

Belarusian shot putter

Dzimitry Hancharuk (or Goncharuk, Belarusian: Дзьмітры Ганчарук, Russian: Дмитрий Гончарук, born 17 July 1970) is a Belarusian shot putter. His best finishes include eighth place at the 1995 World Championships and ninth place at the 1996 Olympic Games. His personal best is 20.12 metres, achieved in June 2001 in Vaasa.

== Achievements ==
Year	Competition	Venue	Position	Notes
Representing Belarus
1994	European Championships	Helsinki, Finland	—	NM
1996	Olympic Games	Atlanta, United States	9th	19.79 m
2001	World Championships	Edmonton, Canada	19th	19.27 m
