= Timo Aaltonen =

Finnish shot putter

- Born: Timo Antero Aaltonen; 11 April 1969 (age 56); Vehmaa, Finland
- Height: 189-cm

Timo Antero Aaltonen (born 11 April 1969) is a 189-cm tall Finnish shot putter who weighs 130 kg and competes for Turun Urheiluliitto, which is the same club that Paavo Nurmi ran for. He competed and won a gold medal at the 2000 European Indoor Athletics Championships with a qualifying put of 20.57 m and a final put of 20.62 m.

Aaltonen was the 13th member to be inducted into the 20 meter club after he putted the shot 20.12 m in a competition on 20 June 1998 in Kuortane, Finland.
