= Corrado Fantini =

Italian shot putter

Personal information
- Nationality: Italian
- Born: 7 February 1967 (age 59) Fidenza, Italy

Sport
- Country: Italy
- Sport: Athletics
- Event: Shot put
Medal record
Representing Italy
Mediterranean Games
Silver medal – second place	1997 Bari	Shot put

Corrado Fantini (born 7 February 1967) is a former Italian shot putter. His personal best was 20.78 metres.

== Biography ==
He ranks fourth on the Italian all-time lists for the event. His daughter is the hammer thrower Sara Fantini.

== Achievements ==
Year	Competition	Venue	Position	Notes
1994	European Championships	Helsinki, Finland	11th	18.30 m
1995	World Indoor Championships	Barcelona, Spain	10th	18.74 m
1996	European Indoor Championships	Stockholm, Sweden	4th	19.79 m
1996	Olympic Games	Atlanta, United States	11th	19.30 m
1997	World Indoor Championships	Paris, France	7th	20.02 m
1997	Mediterranean Games	Bari, Italy	2nd	19.19 m
