= Arsi Harju =

Finnish shot putter (born 1974)

Personal information
- Full name: Arsi Ilari Harju
- Born: 18 March 1974 (age 52) Kurikka, Finland
Medal record
Men's Athletics
Representing Finland
Olympic Games
Gold medal – first place	2000 Sydney	Shot put
World Championships
Bronze medal – third place	2001 Edmonton	Shot put
European Championships
Bronze medal – third place	1998 Valencia	Shot put

Arsi Ilari Harju (born 18 March 1974) is a retired Finnish former track and field athlete who competed in the shot put. He won the gold medal at the 2000 Summer Olympics in Sydney. He set his personal best of 21.39 in the qualification. In the final, Harju secured the gold medal with his second round shot put of 21.29, beating silver medalist Adam Nelson by 8 cm and bronze medalist John Godina by 9 cm. In 2000, Harju was also named the Finnish Sports Personality of the Year.

Harju was the 12th member to be inducted into the 20 metre club after achieving the distance of 20.16 on 2 March 1997, in Tampere, Finland.

Harju was a patron of UNICEF School walks in Finland.

Harju retired from international competitions after the season 2005. He competed again from 2011 to 2012 marking 18.48 as his season best in both years.

== Major achievements ==
Year	Competition	Venue	Position	Notes
Representing Finland
1992	World Junior Championships	Seoul, South Korea	11th	16.94 m
1993	Finnish Indoor Championships	Kuopio, Finland	3rd	17.99 (FR19)
1995	Finnish Outdoor Championships	Lapua, Finland	3rd	19.46
1996	Finnish Outdoor Championships	Tampere, Finland	1st	19.46
1997	Finnish Outdoor Championships	Lappeenranta, Finland	2nd	19.72
1997	Finnish Indoor Championships	Rovaniemi, Finland	2nd	19.77
1998	Finnish Outdoor Championships	Oulu, Finland	1st	21.04
1998	Finnish Indoor Championships	Tampere, Finland	2nd	20.25
1998	European Indoor Championships	Valencia, Spain	3rd	20.53
1999	Finnish Indoor Championships	Jyväskylä, Finland	1st	19.52
2000	Finnish Outdoor Championships	Lahti, Finland	1st	20.84
2000	Summer Olympics	Sydney, Australia	1st	21.29
2001	World Championships	Edmonton, Canada	3rd	20.93
2002	European Championships	Munich, Germany	4th	20.47
2003	World Indoor Championships	Birmingham, England	4th	20.96
2003	Finnish Indoor Championships	Kuortane, Finland	2nd	20.37
2005	Finnish Outdoor Championships	Pori, Finland	2nd	20.21
