= Milan Haborák =

Slovak shot putter

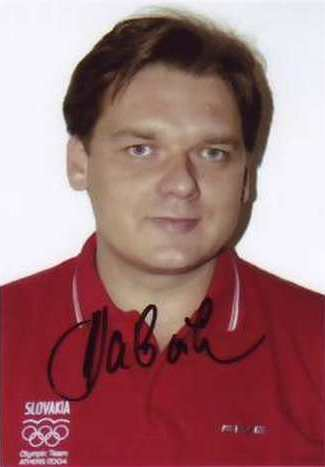

Personal information
- Nationality: Slovakia
- Born: January 11, 1973 (age 53) Prešov, Czechoslovakia
- Years active: 1992–2010

Sport
- Country: Czechoslovakia; Slovakia
- Sport: Athletics
- Event: Shot put

Achievements and titles
- Personal best: 20.87 m (2004)
Medal record
Representing Slovakia
Men's athletics
Universiade
Bronze medal – third place	2001 Beijing	Shot put
IAAF Grand Prix Final
Bronze medal – third place	2002 Paris	Shot Put
Military World Games
Gold medal – first place	2003 Catania	Shot put

Milan Haborák (born 11 January 1973 in Prešov) is a Slovak former shot putter.

Haborák's personal best throw is 20.87 metres, achieved in May 2004 in Turnov. He first broke the 20-metre barrier in 2000. Haborák received a two-year ban in 2004 for using hormones. He was caught again in July 2010 for using steroids and was banned for life in September 2010 for second doping offence.

Haborák is involved in politics, as vice chairman of the extra-parliamentary party Hnutie Vpred.

== Achievements ==
Year	Competition	Venue	Position	Notes
Representing Czechoslovakia
1992	World Junior Championships	Seoul, South Korea	4th	17.97 m
Representing Slovakia
2000	Olympic Games	Sydney, Australia	11th	19.06 m
2001	World Indoor Championships	Lisbon, Portugal	7th	20.05 m
2001	Universiade	Beijing, PR China	3rd	19.90 m
2001	World Championships	Edmonton, Canada	16th	19.52 m
2002	European Championships	Munich, Germany	10th	19.40 m
2002	IAAF Grand Prix Final	Paris, France	3rd	20.40 m
2003	World Indoor Championships	Birmingham, England	7th	20.21 m
2003	Military World Games	Catania, Italy	1st	19.55 m
2003	World Athletics Final	Monte Carlo, Monaco	7th	18.97 m
2006	European Championships	Gothenburg, Sweden	16th	19.38 m

== See also ==
- List of doping cases in athletics
