= C. J. Hunter =

American shot putter (1968–2021)

Personal information
- Full name: Cottrell James Hunter III
- Born: December 14, 1968 Washington, D.C., U.S.
- Died: November 28, 2021 (aged 52)
Medal record
Men's Athletics
Representing the United States
World Championships
Gold medal – first place	1999 Sevilla	Shot Put
Bronze medal – third place	1997 Athens	Shot Put
Pan American Games
Gold medal – first place	1995 Mar del Plata	Shot Put

Cottrell James Hunter III (December 14, 1968 – November 28, 2021) was an American shot putter, coach, and the 1999 World Champion.

Hunter is well known for his involvement in the BALCO scandal and as the former spouse of sprinter Marion Jones.

== Biography ==
=== College career ===
The 6'1", 330 lb Hunter was a three-time All-American at Penn State University, where he still holds the outdoor and indoor shot put record (65'5" and 64'4½", or 19.93 m and 19.62 m respectively). He earned his B.A. in political science in 1991. Hunter first began throwing the shot after failing to make the basketball team at Hyde Park, New York's Franklin D. Roosevelt Senior High School.

=== Olympics and failed drug test ===
Hunter competed at the 1996 Summer Olympics, finishing seventh. Hunter's personal best throw was 71' 9", (21.87 m) thrown during a 2nd-place finish in the 2000 US Olympic Trials.

Hunter tested positive for the performance-enhancing steroid Nandrolone at the Bislett Games, which was revealed before he was scheduled to compete in the 2000 Summer Olympics. Hunter was dropped from the team as a result.

=== Personal life ===
Hunter first met Marion Jones when she was 16. They reconnected in 1995 when he was hired as a coach with the University of North Carolina track team. He was forced to resign from his position after refusing to conform with school rules that prohibited coach-athlete dating. They married on October 3, 1998, and divorced in 2002 following the BALCO scandal.

Hunter resided in Holly Springs, North Carolina with his son Nico from his third marriage.

Hunter died on November 28, 2021, at the age of 52.

== See also ==
- List of Pennsylvania State University Olympians
- List of sportspeople sanctioned for doping offences
