= John Godina =

American shot putter (born 1972)

Personal information
- Born: May 31, 1972 (age 54) Fort Sill, Oklahoma, U.S.
Medal record
Men's athletics
Representing United States
Olympic Games
Silver medal – second place	1996 Atlanta	Shot put
Bronze medal – third place	2000 Sydney	Shot put
World Championships
Gold medal – first place	1995 Gothenburg	Shot put
Gold medal – first place	1997 Athens	Shot put
Gold medal – first place	2001 Edmonton	Shot put
World Indoor Championships
Gold medal – first place	2001 Lisbon	Shot put

John Carl Godina (born May 31, 1972) is a retired American shot putter, whose record includes three World Championship wins and two Olympic medals. He also competed in discus. Godina was born in Fort Sill, Oklahoma.

== Early life ==
While attending Cheyenne Central High School in Cheyenne, Wyoming, Godina was a letterman in football and outdoor track and field. He was an All-State honoree, and an All-American in both sports. His high school personal bests in shot put and discus were 63 feet (19 m) and 210 ft 4 in (64.11 m), respectively.

== College years and Olympic Games ==
At college level, competing for UCLA, he won three outdoor NCAA championship victories, two in discus and one in shot put. His 1995 NCAA Outdoor shot put title was a national record with a throw of 22.00 meters (72 ft 2 in). In 1995, he won his first World Championship title in shot put, adding additional titles in 1997, and 2001. In the same discipline, he finished second in the 1996 Olympics and third in the 2000 Olympics. He also qualified to those same Olympics in the Discus, the first American to qualify in both since Bud Houser in 1924 and he finished 8th in the 2004 Olympics in the Shot Put. He retired in 2009 after suffering through injuries at the 2008 Olympic Trials.

Godina is one of the most decorated shot putters in U.S. athletics history. His legacy compares well with Parry O'Brien, who won two Olympic gold medals (1952, 1956) and one silver medal (1960), placed fourth in the Tokyo Olympics in 1964, and broke the world record 17 times.

Godina was named to the Mt. SAC Relays Hall of Fame in 2010. He was inducted into the UCLA Athletics Hall of Fame in 2005.

== World Throws Center ==
John has a throwing academy in five different locations, two in California (Sacramento and San Ramon). The other three are located in Arizona (Phoenix, Mesa and Glendale).

Godina trains top international athletes like Vikas Gowda, Suzy Powell and Dan Taylor.

== Achievements ==
Year	Competition	Venue	Position	Event	Notes
Representing the United States
1990	World Junior Championships	Plovdiv, Bulgaria	20th (q)	Discus	40.88 m
1996	Olympic Games	Atlanta, United States	2nd	Shot put	20.79 m
1997	IAAF Grand Prix Final	Fukuoka, Japan	3rd	Discus	65.56 m
2000	Olympic Games	Sydney, Australia	3rd	Shot put	21.20 m
2001	World Championships	Edmonton, Canada	1st	Shot put	21.87 m
2004	Olympic Games	Athens, Greece	8th	Shot put	20.19 m
