= Paolo Dal Soglio =

Italian shot putter (born 1970)

Personal information
- Nickname: Paolone
- Nationality: Italian
- Born: 29 July 1970 (age 55) Schio, Italy
- Height: 1.90 m (6 ft 3 in)
- Weight: 125 kg (276 lb)

Sport
- Country: Italy
- Sport: Athletics
- Event: Shot put
- Club: C.S. Carabinieri

Achievements and titles
- Personal best: Shot put: 21.23 m (1996)
Medal record
Event	1st	2nd	3rd
European Indoor Ch.	1	0	0
Summer Universiade	0	2	0
Mediterranean Games	1	1	0
European Cup	3	2	3
World Military Games	1	0	0
World Military Championships	0	1	0
European Indoor Championships
Gold medal – first place	1996 Stockholm	Shot put
Summer Universiade
Silver medal – second place	1993 Buffalo	Shot put
Silver medal – second place	1997 Catania	Shot put
Mediterranean Games
Gold medal – first place	1993 Languedoc	Shot put
Silver medal – second place	2001 Tunis	Shot put

Paolo Dal Soglio (born 29 July 1970 in Schio) is an Italian shot putter.

At all 2012 season he won 15 medals (6 gold, 6 silver, 3 bronze) at the International athletics competitions.

== Biography ==
Best known for his gold medal at the 1996 European Indoor Championships and the fourth place at the 1996 Olympic Games. His personal best was 21.23 metres, achieved in September 1996 in Grosseto. In his career he won 26 times the national championships.

== Progression ==
Year	Performance	Venue	Date	World Ranking
2012	19.10 m	(Italy) Savona	10-6-2012	106º
2011	18.59 m	(Italy) Cles	25-8-2011	133º
2010	18.29 m	(Italy) Pergine Valsugana	10-7-2010	185º
2009	19.18 m	(Italy) Pergine Valsugana	25-7-2009	90º
2008	19.38 m	(Italy) Padua	31-8-2008	87º
2007	18.93 m	(Italy) Palermo	30-9-2007	125º
2006	18.05 m	(Italy) Modena	21-5-2006	200º
2005	18.66 m	(Italy) Cesenatico	12-6-2005	137º
2004	20.19 m	(Italy) Pergine Valsugana	23-7-2004	40º
2003	19.72 m	(Italy) Padua	6-7-2003	51º
2002	20.86 m	(Italy) Riese Pio X	22-9-2002	13º
2001	20.86 m	(Italy) Cuneo	8-9-2001	11º
2000	20.75 m	(Italy) Rieti	3-9-2000	14º
1999	20.41 m	(South Africa) Pretoria	29-1-1999	18º
1998	20.65 m	(Italy) Borgo Valsugana	31-7-1998	11º
1997	20.69 m	(Italy) Avezzano	24-8-1997	10º
1996	21.23 m	(Italy) Grosseto	11-9-1996	4º
1995	20.57 m	(Italy) Padua	16-7-1995	10º
1994	20.68 m	(Italy) Modena	5-10-1994	8º
1993	20.43 m	(Italy) Vicenza	3-4-1993	-
1992	19.76 m	(United Kingdom) Sheffield	5-6-1992	39º
1991	18.60 m	(Italy) Ponzano Veneto	23-6-1991	82º
1990	18.48 m	(Italy) Bologna	27-9-1990	102º
1989	18.23 m	(Italy) Mestre	22-10-1989	-
1988	17.69 m	(Italy) Vicenza	4-10-1988	-

== Achievements ==
Year	Competition	Venue	Position	Event	Notes
Representing Italy
1988	World Junior Championships	Sudbury, Canada	14th (q)	Shot put	15.78 m
1988	World Junior Championships	Sudbury, Canada	15th (q)	Discus	48.12 m
1993	World Indoor Championships	Toronto, Canada	5th	Shot put	19.74 m
1993	Universiade	Buffalo, United States	2nd	Shot put	19.64 m
1993	Mediterranean Games	Narbonne, France	1st	Shot put	20.22 m
1994	European Championships	Helsinki, Finland	8th	Shot put	19.15 m
1995	World Indoor Championships	Barcelona, Spain	7th	Shot put	19.44 m
1995	World Championships	Gothenburg, Sweden	9th	Shot put	19.38 m
1996	European Indoor Championships	Stockholm, Sweden	1st	Shot put	20.50 m
1996	Olympic Games	Atlanta, United States	4th	Shot put	20.74 m
1996	IAAF Grand Prix Final	Milan, Italy	3rd	Shot put	21.13 m
1997	World Championships	Athens, Greece	9th	Shot put	19.77 m
1997	Universiade	Catania, Italy	2nd	Shot put	20.01 m
1998	European Championships	Budapest, Hungary	5th	Shot put	20.50 m
1999	World Indoor Championships	Maebashi, Japan	6th	Shot put	20.10 m
1999	Military World Games	Zagreb, Croatia	1st	Shot put	20.39 m
2000	Olympic Games	Sydney, Australia	19th (q)	Shot put	19.39 m
2001	World Indoor Championships	Lisbon, Portugal	5th	Shot put	20.17 m
2001	Mediterranean Games	Radès, Tunisia	2nd	Shot put	20.60 m
2001	World Championships	Edmonton, Canada	13th (q)	Shot put	19.80 m
(q) Indicates overall position in qualifying round

== National titles ==
- 12 wins in shot put at the Italian Athletics Championships (1994/1996, 1998/2004, 2011–2012)
- 14 wins in shot put at the Italian Athletics Indoor Championships (1993/1994, 1996/2004, 2008/2009, 2012)

== See also ==
- Italian Athletics Championships - Multi winners
- Italy national athletics team - More caps
- List of Italian records in masters athletics
