= 1998 European Athletics Indoor Championships =

- Dates: 27 February – 1 March
- Host city: Valencia; Spain
- Venue: Palace of Luis Puig
- Events: 26
- Participation: 484 athletes from 39 nations

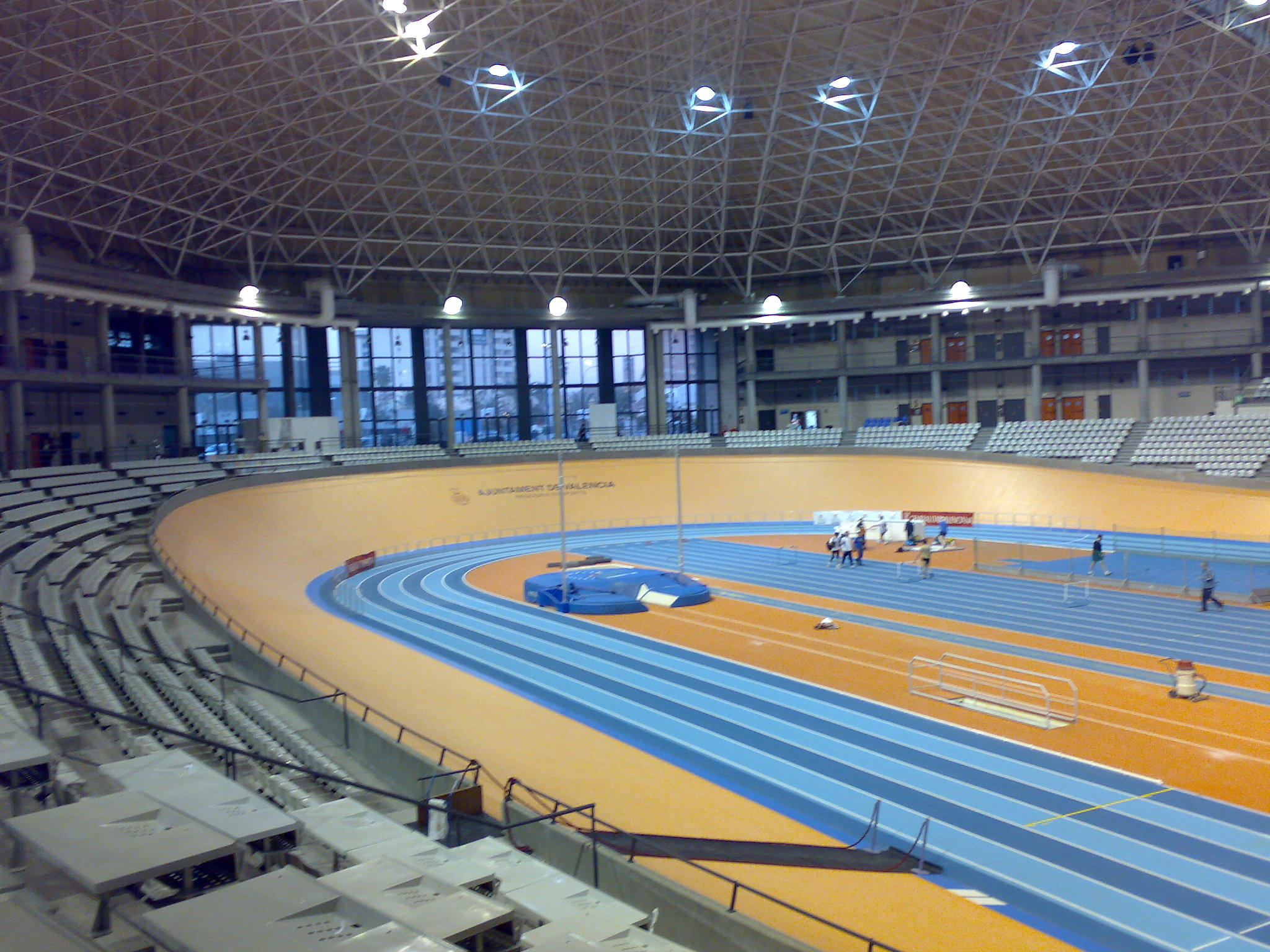
Host venue in Valencia

The 1998 European Athletics Indoor Championships were held from Friday, 27 February to Sunday, 1 March 1998 at the Palace of Luis Puig, Valencia, Spain.

== Results ==
=== Men ===
Event	Gold		Silver		Bronze	
60 metres	Angelos Pavlakakis; Greece	6.55	Jason Gardener; Great Britain	6.59	Stéphane Cali; France	6.60
200 metres	Serhiy Osovych; Ukraine	20.40; NR	Anninos Marcoullides; Cyprus	20.65	Allyn Condon; Great Britain	20.68
400 metres	Ruslan Mashchenko; Russia	45.90	Ashraf Saber; Italy	45.99	Robert Maćkowiak; Poland	46.00
800 metres	Nils Schumann; Germany	1:47.02	Marko Koers; Netherlands	1:47.20	Vebjørn Rodal; Norway	1:47.40
1500 metres	Rui Silva; Portugal	3:44.57	Abdelkader Chékhémani; France	3:44.89	Andrey Zadorozhniy; Russia	3:44.93
3000 metres	John Mayock; Great Britain	7:55.09	Manuel Pancorbo; Spain	7:55.23	Alberto García; Spain	7:55.24
60 m hurdles	Igors Kazanovs; Latvia	7.54	Tomasz Ścigaczewski; Poland	7.56	Mike Fenner; Germany	7.58
High jump	Artur Partyka; Poland	2.31	Vyacheslav Voronin; Russia	2.31	Tomáš Janků; Czech Republic	2.29
Pole vault	Tim Lobinger; Germany	5.80	Michael Stolle; Germany	5.80	Daniel Ecker; Germany	5.75
Long jump	Alexey Lukashevich; Ukraine	8.06	Carlos Calado; Portugal	8.05	Emmanuel Bangué; France	8.05
Triple jump	Jonathan Edwards; Great Britain	17.43	Charles Friedek; Germany	17.15	Serge Hélan; France	17.02
Shot put	Oliver-Sven Buder; Germany	21.47	Mika Halvari; Finland	20.59	Arsi Harju; Finland	20.53
Heptathlon	Sebastian Chmara; Poland	6415	Dezső Szabó; Hungary	6249; NR	Lev Lobodin; Russia	6226

=== Women ===
Event	Gold		Silver		Bronze	
60 metres	Melanie Paschke; Germany	7.14	Frederique Bangue; France	7.18	Odiah Sidibé; France	7.22
200 metres	Svetlana Goncharenko; Russia	22.46	Melanie Paschke; Germany	22.50	Ekaterini Koffa; Greece	22.86
400 metres	Grit Breuer; Germany	50.45	Ionela Târlea; Romania	50.56	Helena Fuchsová; Czech Republic	51.22
800 metres	Ludmila Formanová; Czech Republic	2:02.30	Malin Ewerlöf; Sweden	2:03.61	Judit Varga; Hungary	2:03.81
1500 metres	Theresia Kiesl; Austria	4:13.62	Lidia Chojecka; Poland	4:14.93	Violeta Szekely; Romania	4:15.54
3000 metres	Gabriela Szabo; Romania	8:49.96	Fernanda Ribeiro; Portugal	8:51.42	Marta Domínguez; Spain	8:57.72
60 m hurdles	Patricia Girard-Léno; France	7.85	Svetlana Laukhova; Russia	8.01	Diane Allahgreen; Great Britain	8.02
High jump	Monica Iagar; Romania	1.96	Alina Astafei; Germany	1.94	Yelena Yelesina; Russia	1.94
Pole vault	Anzhela Balakhonova; Ukraine	4.45; WR	Daniela Bártová; Czech Republic	4.40	Vala Flosadóttir; Iceland	4.40
Long jump	Fiona May; Italy	6.91	Tatyana Ter-Mesrobyan; Russia	6.72	Linda Ferga; France	6.67
Triple jump	Ashia Hansen; Great Britain	15.16; WR	Šárka Kašpárková; Czech Republic	14.76	Yelena Lebedenko; Russia	14.32
Shot put	Irina Korzhanenko; Russia	20.25	Vita Pavlysh; Ukraine	20.00	Corrie de Bruin; Netherlands	18.97
Pentathlon	Urszula Włodarczyk; Poland	4808	Irina Belova; Russia	4631	Karin Specht; Germany	4523

== Medal table ==
Rank	Nation	Gold	Silver	Bronze	Total
1	Germany (GER)	5	4	3	12
2	Russia (RUS)	3	4	4	11
3	Poland (POL)	3	2	1	6
4	Great Britain (GBR)	3	1	2	6
5	Ukraine (UKR)	3	1	0	4
6	Romania (ROM)	2	1	1	4
7	France (FRA)	1	2	5	8
8	Czech Republic (CZE)	1	2	2	5
9	Portugal (POR)	1	2	0	3
10	Italy (ITA)	1	1	0	2
11	Greece (GRE)	1	0	1	2
12	Austria (AUT)	1	0	0	1
12	Latvia (LAT)	1	0	0	1
14	Spain (ESP)	0	1	2	3
15	Finland (FIN)	0	1	1	2
15	Hungary (HUN)	0	1	1	2
15	Netherlands (NED)	0	1	1	2
18	Cyprus (CYP)	0	1	0	1
18	Sweden (SWE)	0	1	0	1
20	Iceland (ISL)	0	0	1	1
20	Norway (NOR)	0	0	1	1
Totals (21 entries)		26	26	26	78

== Participating nations ==
- Andorra (2)
- Armenia (1)
- Austria (9)
- Belarus (5)
- Belgium (13)
- Bosnia and Herzegovina (1)
- Bulgaria (12)
- Croatia (3)
- Cyprus (6)
- Czech Republic (20)
- Denmark (4)
- Estonia (3)
- Finland (4)
- France (49)
- Georgia (2)
- Germany (33)
- Great Britain (33)
- Greece (24)
- Hungary (10)
- Iceland (3)
- Ireland (10)
- Israel (5)
- Italy (22)
- Latvia (8)
- Lithuania (3)
- Malta (1)
- Netherlands (20)
- Norway (6)
- Poland (17)
- Portugal (10)
- Romania (17)
- Russia (33)
- Slovenia (5)
- Spain (46)
- Sweden (16)
- Switzerland (7)
- Turkey (6)
- Ukraine (12)
- Yugoslavia (3)

== See also ==
- 1998 in athletics (track and field)
