= 1990 European Athletics Indoor Championships – Men's shot put =

The men's shot put event at the 1990 European Athletics Indoor Championships was held in Kelvin Hall on 3 March.

== Results ==
Rank	Name	Nationality	#1	#2	#3	#4	#5	#6	Result	Notes
1st place, gold medalist(s)	Klaus Bodenmüller	Austria	19.94	18.33	20.11	19.99	20.05	21.03	21.03	NR
2nd place, silver medalist(s)	Ulf Timmermann	East Germany	20.43	19.88	20.16				20.43	
3rd place, bronze medalist(s)	Oliver-Sven Buder	East Germany							20.20	
4	Kalman Konya	West Germany							19.63	
5	Alessandro Andrei	Italy							19.44	
6	Remigius Machura	Czechoslovakia							19.38	
7	Dimitrios Koutsoukis	Greece							19.32	
8	Karsten Stolz	West Germany	19.10	18.62	18.75	x	18.45	19.14	19.14	
9	Bernd Kneißler	West Germany							19.06	
10	Lars Arvid Nilsen	Norway							18.90	
11	Sören Tallhem	Sweden							18.78	
12	Karel Šula	Czechoslovakia							18.65	
13	Jan Sagedal	Norway							18.65	
14	Pétur Guðmundsson	Iceland							18.59	
15	Helmut Krieger	Poland							18.57	
16	Luc Viudès	France							18.11	
17	Paul Edwards	Great Britain							17.56	
18	Fernando Alves	Portugal							16.59	
19	Mehmet Yardımcı	Turkey							15.32	
	Sergey Smirnov	Soviet Union							NM	
