= 1991 World Championships in Athletics – Men's shot put =

These are the official results of the Men's Shot Put event at the 1991 IAAF World Championships in Tokyo, Japan. There were a total number of 23 participating athletes, with the final held on Saturday August 31, 1991. Werner Günthör of Switzerland won the competition with a throw of 21.67 metres.

The original silver medallist, Georg Andersen of Norway, was disqualified and stripped of his medal after testing positive for anabolic steroids. The original bronze medallist (Lars Arvid Nilsen) was elevated to the silver while the fourth-placed Soviet thrower Aleksandr Klimenko received the bronze instead.

== Medalists ==
Gold	Werner Günthör; Switzerland (SUI)
Silver	Lars Arvid Nilsen; Norway (NOR)
Bronze	Aleksandr Klimenko; Soviet Union (URS)

== Schedule ==
- All times are Japan Standard Time (UTC+9)

Qualification Round
Group A	Group B
30.08.1991 – 10:30h	30.08.1991 – 10:30h
Final Round
31.08.1991 – 18:30h

== Abbreviations ==
- All results shown are in metres

Q	automatic qualification
q	qualification by rank
DNS	did not start
NM	no mark
WR	world record
AR	area record
NR	national record
PB	personal best
SB	season best

== Records ==
Standing records prior to the 1991 World Athletics Championships
World Record	Randy Barnes (USA)	23.12 m	May 20, 1990	Westwood, United States
Event Record	Werner Günthör (SUI)	22.23 m	August 29, 1987	Rome, Italy

== Qualification ==
RANK	GROUP A	DISTANCE
1.	Werner Günthör (SUI)	20.97 m
2.	Sergey Nikolayev (URS)	20.16 m
3.	Lars Arvid Nilsen (NOR)	19.79 m
4.	Gert Weil (CHI)	19.51 m
5.	Oliver-Sven Buder (GER)	19.44 m
6.	Paul Edwards (GBR)	19.28 m
7.	Dragan Perić (YUG)	19.21 m
8.	Gheorghe Guşet (ROM)	18.55 m
9.	Luc Viudes (FRA)	18.43 m
10.	C.J. Hunter (USA)	17.97 m
—	Sören Tallhem (SWE)	NM

RANK	GROUP B	DISTANCE
1.	Georg Andersen (NOR)	20.41 m
2.	Aleksandr Klimenko (URS)	19.79 m
3.	Kent Larsson (SWE)	19.20 m
4.	Ron Backes (USA)	19.05 m
5.	Alessandro Andrei (ITA)	19.00 m
6.	Jan Sagedal (NOR)	18.90 m
7.	Pétur Guðmundsson (ISL)	18.51 m
8.	Karel Sula (TCH)	18.30 m
9.	Kalman Konya (GER)	18.26 m
10.	Khaled Al-Khalidi (KSA)	16.38 m
11.	Lim Chee-Wee (BRU)	13.49 m
—	Dimitrios Koutsoukis (GRE)	NM

== Final ==
RANK	FINAL	DISTANCE
	Werner Günthör (SUI)	21.67 m
	Lars Arvid Nilsen (NOR)	20.75 m
	Aleksandr Klimenko (URS)	20.34 m
4.	Oliver-Sven Buder (GER)	20.10 m
5.	Sergey Nikolayev (URS)	19.98 m
6.	Kent Larsson (SWE)	19.92 m
7.	Dragan Perić (YUG)	19.83 m
8.	Ron Backes (USA)	19.34 m
9.	Gert Weil (CHI)	19.30 m
10.	Paul Edwards (GBR)	18.91 m
11.	Alessandro Andrei (ITA)	18.73 m
—	Georg Andersen (NOR)	DSQ

== See also ==
- 1990 Men's European Championships Shot Put (Split)
- 1991 Shot Put Year Ranking
- 1992 Men's Olympic Shot Put (Barcelona)
