= 1994 European Athletics Championships – Men's shot put =

Men's shot put at the European Athletics Championships

These are the official results of the Men's shot put event at the 1994 European Championships in Helsinki, Finland, held at Helsinki Olympic Stadium on 12 and 13 August 1994. There were a total number of 25 participating athletes, with two qualifying groups.

== Medalists ==
Gold	Aleksandr Klimenko; Ukraine
Silver	Aleksandr Bagach; Ukraine
Bronze	Roman Virastyuk; Ukraine

== Final ==
Rank	Final	Distance
	Aleksandr Klimenko (UKR)	20.78 m
	Aleksandr Bagach (UKR)	20.34 m
	Roman Virastyuk (UKR)	19.59 m
4.	Mika Halvari (FIN)	19.52 m
5.	Markus Koistinen (FIN)	19.51 m
6.	Dragan Perić (Independent European Participants)	19.40 m
7.	Pétur Guðmundsson (ISL)	19.34 m
8.	Paolo Dal Soglio (ITA)	19.15 m
9.	Thorsten Herbrand (GER)	19.10 m
10.	Saulius Kleiza (LTU)	18.80 m
11.	Corrado Fantini (ITA)	18.30 m
12.	Roar Hoff (NOR)	18.15 m

== Qualifying round ==
- Held on 12 August 1994

Rank	Group A	Distance
1.	Dragan Perić (Independent European Participants)	19.64 m
2.	Aleksandr Klimenko (UKR)	19.45 m
3.	Mika Halvari (FIN)	19.29 m
4.	Saulius Kleiza (LTU)	18.77 m
5.	Thorsten Herbrand (GER)	18.65 m
6.	Corrado Fantini (ITA)	18.64 m
7.	Paul Edwards (GBR)	18.54 m
8.	Henrik Wennberg (SWE)	18.52 m
9.	Oliver-Sven Buder (GER)	18.41 m
10.	Kjell Ove Hauge (NOR)	18.23 m
11.	Ants Kiisa (EST)	17.01 m
—	Sergey Nikolayev (RUS)	NM
—	Dzimitry Hancharuk (BLR)	NM

Rank	Group B	Distance
1.	Pétur Guðmundsson (ISL)	19.69 m
2.	Aleksandr Bagach (UKR)	19.65 m
3.	Roman Virastyuk (UKR)	19.25 m
4.	Paolo Dal Soglio (ITA)	19.23 m
5.	Markus Koistinen (FIN)	19.05 m
6.	Roar Hoff (NOR)	18.69 m
7.	Manuel Martínez (ESP)	18.53 m
8.	Jonny Reinhardt (GER)	18.33 m
9.	Jenő Kóczián (HUN)	18.20 m
10.	Kent Larsson (SWE)	18.19 m
11.	Sören Tallhem (SWE)	18.07 m
12.	Antero Paljakka (FIN)	18.00 m

== Participation ==
According to an unofficial count, 25 athletes from 15 countries participated in the event.

- Belarus (1)
- Estonia (1)
- Finland (3)
- Germany (3)
- Hungary (1)
- Iceland (1)
- Independent European Participants (1)
- Italy (2)
- Lithuania (1)
- Norway (2)
- Russia (1)
- Spain (1)
- Sweden (3)
- Ukraine (3)
- United Kingdom (1)

== See also ==
- 1991 Men's World Championships Shot Put (Tokyo)
- 1992 Men's Olympic Shot Put (Barcelona)
- 1993 Men's World Championships Shot Put (Stuttgart)
- 1994 Shot Put Year Ranking
- 1995 Men's World Championships Shot Put (Gothenburg)
- 1996 Men's Olympic Shot Put (Atlanta)
- 1997 Men's World Championships Shot Put (Athens)
