= 1993 World Championships in Athletics – Men's shot put =

These are the official results of the Men's Shot Put event at the 1993 IAAF World Championships in Stuttgart, Germany. There were a total number of 32 participating athletes, with the final held on Saturday August 21, 1993. The qualification mark was set at 20.00 metres.

== Medalists ==
Gold	Werner Günthör; Switzerland (SUI)
Silver	Randy Barnes; United States (USA)
Bronze	Oleksandr Bagach; Ukraine (UKR)

== Schedule ==
- All times are Central European Time (UTC+1)

Qualification Round
Group A	Group B
20.08.1993 – 11:45h	20.08.1993 – 11:45h
Final Round
21.08.1993 – 18:15h

== Abbreviations ==
- All results shown are in metres

Q	automatic qualification
q	qualification by rank
DNS	did not start
NM	no mark
WR	world record
AR	area record
NR	national record
PB	personal best
SB	season best

== Records ==
Standing records prior to the 1993 World Athletics Championships
World Record	Randy Barnes (USA)	23.12 m	May 20, 1990	Westwood, United States
Event Record	Werner Günthör (SUI)	22.23 m	August 29, 1987	Rome, Italy

== Qualification ==
- Held on Friday 1993-08-20

RANK	GROUP A	DISTANCE
1.	Randy Barnes (USA)	20.21 m
2.	Yevgeniy Palchikov (RUS)	19.91 m
3.	Oliver-Sven Buder (GER)	19.88 m
4.	Kevin Toth (USA)	19.63 m
5.	Kent Larsson (SWE)	19.56 m
6.	Gert Weil (CHI)	19.52 m
7.	Aleksandr Klimenko (UKR)	19.37 m
8.	Markus Koistinen (FIN)	19.29 m
9.	Courtney Ireland (NZL)	19.08 m
10.	Gheorghe Guset (ROM)	18.95 m
11.	Sergey Rubtsov (KAZ)	18.84 m
12.	Jenő Kóczián (HUN)	18.45 m
13.	Chima Ugwu (NGR)	18.19 m
14.	Klaus Bodenmüller (AUT)	18.07 m
15.	Paul Quirke (IRL)	17.05 m
16.	Jaime Comandari (ESA)	14.97 m

RANK	GROUP B	DISTANCE
1.	Werner Günthör (SUI)	20.56 m
2.	Mike Stulce (USA)	20.53 m
3.	Oleksandr Bagach (UKR)	19.89 m
4.	Dragan Perić (IWP)	19.77 m
5.	Jonny Reinhardt (GER)	19.76 m
6.	Manuel Martínez (ESP)	19.53 m
7.	Antero Paljakka (FIN)	19.31 m
8.	Aleksandr Klimov (BLR)	19.07 m
9.	Paul Edwards (GBR)	19.00 m
10.	Paolo Dal Soglio (ITA)	18.68 m
11.	Andriy Nemchaninov (UKR)	18.28 m
12.	Sergey Kot (UZB)	18.22 m
13.	Mika Halvari (FIN)	18.19 m
14.	Merab Kurashvili (GEO)	18.18 m
15.	Pétur Guðmundsson (ISL)	18.11 m
16.	Dashdendev Makhashiri (MGL)	14.87 m

== Final ==
RANK	FINAL	DISTANCE
	Werner Günthör (SUI)	21.97 m
	Randy Barnes (USA)	21.80 m
	Oleksandr Bagach (UKR)	20.40 m
4.	Yevgeniy Palchikov (RUS)	20.05 m
5.	Dragan Perić (IWP)	19.95 m
6.	Gert Weil (CHI)	19.95 m
7.	Oliver-Sven Buder (GER)	19.74 m
8.	Jonny Reinhardt (GER)	19.53 m
9.	Kevin Toth (USA)	19.52 m
10.	Kent Larsson (SWE)	19.12 m
11.	Manuel Martínez (ESP)	19.03 m
—	Mike Stulce (USA)	DSQ

== See also ==
- 1992 Men's Olympic Shot Put
- 1993 Shot Put Year Ranking
