= 1990 European Athletics Championships – Men's shot put =

Men's shot put at the European Athletics Championships

These are the official results of the Men's Shot Put event at the 1990 European Championships in Split, Yugoslavia, held at Stadion Poljud on 28 and 29 August 1990. There were a total number of nineteen participating athletes.

== Medalists ==
Gold	Ulf Timmermann; East Germany
Silver	Oliver-Sven Buder; East Germany
Bronze	Georg Andersen; Norway

== Final ==
Rank	Final	Distance
	Ulf Timmermann (GDR)	21.32 m
	Oliver-Sven Buder (GDR)	21.01 m
	Georg Andersen (NOR)	20.71 m
4.	Sergey Smirnov (URS)	20.45 m
5.	Udo Beyer (GDR)	20.21 m
6.	Lars Arvid Nilsen (NOR)	20.13 m
7.	Sergey Nikolayev (URS)	19.97 m
8.	Karsten Stolz (FRG)	19.95 m
9.	Kalman Konya (FRG)	19.71 m
10.	Klaus Bodenmüller (AUT)	19.62 m
11.	Pétur Guðmundsson (ISL)	19.46 m
12.	Dragan Perić (YUG)	18.67 m
—	Vyacheslav Lykho (URS)	DSQ^{†}

^{†}: Vyacheslav Lykho ranked initially 3rd (20.81m), but was disqualified for infringement of IAAF doping rules.

== Qualification ==
Rank	Group A	Distance
1.	Lars Arvid Nilsen (NOR)	20.15 m
2.	Oliver-Sven Buder (GDR)	20.08 m
3.	Sergey Smirnov (URS)	19.86 m
4.	Sergey Nikolayev (URS)	19.67 m
5.	Dragan Perić (YUG)	19.51 m
6.	Karsten Stolz (FRG)	19.39 m
7.	Pétur Guðmundsson (ISL)	19.25 m
8.	Bernd Kneissler (FRG)	19.07 m
9.	Paul Edwards (GBR)	18.66 m

Rank	Group B	Distance
1.	Ulf Timmermann (GDR)	20.42 m
2.	Georg Andersen (NOR)	20.38 m
3.	Udo Beyer (GDR)	20.09 m
4.	Kalman Konya (FRG)	19.64 m
5.	Klaus Bodenmüller (AUT)	19.25 m
6.	Helmut Krieger (POL)	19.20 m
7.	Jovan Lazarević (YUG)	19.18 m
8.	Gheorghe Guset (ROM)	18.87 m
9.	Jan Sagedal (NOR)	18.73 m
—	Vyacheslav Lykho (URS)	DSQ^{†}

^{†}: Vyacheslav Lykho initially reached the final (19.88m), but was disqualified later for infringement of IAAF doping rules.

== Participation ==
According to an unofficial count, 19 athletes from 10 countries participated in the event.

- Austria (1)
- East Germany (3)
- Iceland (1)
- Norway (3)
- Poland (1)
- Romania (1)
- Soviet Union (3)
- United Kingdom (1)
- West Germany (3)
- Yugoslavia (2)

== See also ==
- 1988 Men's Olympic Shot Put (Seoul)
- 1990 Shot Put Year Ranking
- 1991 Men's World Championships Shot Put (Tokyo)
- 1992 Men's Olympic Shot Put (Barcelona)
- 1994 Men's European Championships Shot Put (Helsinki)
