= Athletics at the 1985 Summer Universiade – Men's shot put =

The men's shot put event at the 1985 Summer Universiade was held at the Kobe Universiade Memorial Stadium in Kobe on 31 August 1985.

== Results ==
Rank	Athlete	Nationality	Result	Notes
1st place, gold medalist(s)	Remigius Machura	Czechoslovakia	21.13	GR
2nd place, silver medalist(s)	Alessandro Andrei	Italy	20.85	
3rd place, bronze medalist(s)	Ventislav Khristov	Bulgaria	19.90	
4	Sergey Gavryushin	Soviet Union	19.73	
5	Ronald Backes	United States	19.57	
6	Karel Šula	Czechoslovakia	18.86	
7	Mike Spiritoso	Canada	18.60	
8	Yoshihasa Urita	Japan	17.52	
9	Avtar Singh	India	15.39	
	Marty Kobza	United States	NM	
