= 1991 IAAF World Indoor Championships – Men's shot put =

The men's shot put event at the 1991 IAAF World Indoor Championships was held on 8 March.

== Results ==
Rank	Name	Nationality	#1	#2	#3	#4	#5	#6	Result	Notes
1st place, gold medalist(s)	Werner Günthör	Switzerland	20.74	x	20.70	21.17	x	20.22	21.17	
2nd place, silver medalist(s)	Klaus Bodenmüller	Austria	19.82	20.42	20.01	19.97	20.12	19.80	20.42	
3rd place, bronze medalist(s)	Ron Backes	United States	19.02	19.49	20.06	19.49	x	19.45	20.06	
4	Pétur Guðmundsson	Iceland	19.30	19.66	18.73	19.71	19.81	19.64	19.81	
5	Lars Arvid Nilsen	Norway	19.45	x	18.63	19.69	x	x	19.69	
6	Gert Weil	Chile	19.35	18.92	19.56	x	x	x	19.56	
7	Oliver-Sven Buder	Germany	19.41	19.38	x	19.08	18.79	x	19.41	
8	Art McDermott	United States	18.96	18.99	19.03	x	x	x	19.03	
9	Sergey Smirnov	Soviet Union	18.87	18.84	18.83				18.87	
10	Paul Edwards	Great Britain	17.62	18.17	18.65				18.65	
11	Helmut Krieger	Poland	18.59	18.28	18.47				18.59	
12	Paul Ruiz	Cuba	x	18.57	x				18.57	
13	Jan Sagedal	Norway	18.38	17.98	x				18.38	
14	Alessandro Andrei	Italy	18.29	18.11	18.21				18.29	
15	Gheorghe Gușet	Romania	17.71	18.00	18.07				18.07	
16	Igor Avrunin	Israel	17.54	x	17.18				17.54	
