= 1989 European Athletics Indoor Championships – Men's shot put =

The men's shot put event at the 1989 European Athletics Indoor Championships was held on 18 February.

== Results ==
Rank	Name	Nationality	Result	Notes
1st place, gold medalist(s)	Ulf Timmermann	East Germany	21.68	
2nd place, silver medalist(s)	Karsten Stolz	West Germany	20.22	
3rd place, bronze medalist(s)	Georg Andersen	Norway	20.22	
4	Vyacheslav Lykho	Soviet Union	20.16	
5	Karel Šula	Czechoslovakia	20.11	
6	Erik de Bruin	Netherlands	19.71	
7	Helmut Krieger	Poland	19.51	
8	Janne Ronkainen	Finland	19.31	
9	Dimitrios Koutsoukis	Greece	18.93	
10	Aubert Tréguilly	France	18.30	
11	Matt Simson	Great Britain	17.38	
12	Pétur Guðmundsson	Iceland	17.17	
