= 1992 European Athletics Indoor Championships – Men's shot put =

The men's shot put event at the 1992 European Athletics Indoor Championships was held in Palasport di Genova on 29 February 1992.

== Results ==
Rank	Name	Nationality	#1	#2	#3	#4	#5	#6	Result	Notes
1st place, gold medalist(s)	Aleksandr Bagach	Unified Team	19.78	20.75	x	20.37	20.45	x	20.75	
2nd place, silver medalist(s)	Aleksandr Klimenko	Unified Team	x	19.83	20.02	19.88	19.89	x	20.02	
3rd place, bronze medalist(s)	Klaus Bodenmüller	Austria	19.99	19.51	19.17	19.15	19.92	19.88	19.99	
4	Luciano Zerbini	Italy	18.21	19.04	19.31	19.27	19.45	19.68	19.68	
5	Pétur Guðmundsson	Iceland	18.90	18.78	19.17	19.53	18.94	19.00	19.53	
6	Alessandro Andrei	Italy	19.00	19.14	19.51	19.51	19.26	19.17	19.51	
7	Lars Arvid Nilsen	Norway	18.66	18.90	19.01	x	19.11	x	19.11	
8	Paul Edwards	Great Britain	18.74	19.04	x	x	18.59	x	19.04	
9	Jan Sagedal	Norway	x	18.71	x				18.71	
10	Kent Larsson	Sweden	18.03	18.42	18.28				18.42	
11	Antero Paljakka	Finland	18.23	17.87	18.07				18.23	PB
12	Paolo Dal Soglio	Italy	17.90	18.16	x				18.16	
13	Petri Torniainen	Finland	17.75	17.62	17.74				17.75	
14	Māris Petraško	Latvia	17.32	17.65	x				17.65	
15	Victor Costello	Ireland	16.16	x	15.59				16.16	
