= 1987 IAAF World Indoor Championships – Men's shot put =

The men's shot put event at the 1987 IAAF World Indoor Championships was held at the Hoosier Dome in Indianapolis on 7 March.

== Results ==
Rank	Name	Nationality	#1	#2	#3	#4	#5	#6	Result	Notes
1st place, gold medalist(s)	Ulf Timmermann	East Germany	21.72	21.31	22.11	21.25	x	22.24	22.24	CR, NR
2nd place, silver medalist(s)	Werner Günthör	Switzerland	21.47	x	x	x	21.61	20.94	21.61	
3rd place, bronze medalist(s)	Sergey Smirnov	Soviet Union	20.40	20.29	20.54	20.67	x	x	20.67	
4	Gregg Tafralis	United States	19.38	19.65	x	19.57	20.08	20.26	20.26	
5	Lars Arvid Nilsen	Norway	19.57	19.52	20.09	19.84	19.59	19.50	20.09	
6	Ron Backes	United States	19.52	19.98	x	x	20.02	20.02	20.02	
7	Udo Gelhausen	West Germany	19.50	19.21	19.60	19.71	19.80	19.44	19.80	
8	Karsten Stolz	West Germany	19.43	19.60	19.19	19.31	19.54	x	19.60	
9	Gert Weil	Chile	18.90	18.59	18.65				18.90	
10	Klaus Bodenmüller	Austria	18.59	18.84	18.36				18.84	
11	Dimitrios Koutsoukis	Greece	x	18.01	x				18.01	
12	Mohamed Achouche	Egypt	16.99	17.33	17.87				17.87	
13	Eggert Bogason	Iceland	17.35	x	x				17.35	
