= 1996 European Athletics Indoor Championships – Men's shot put =

The men's shot put event at the 1996 European Athletics Indoor Championships was held in Stockholm Globe Arena on 8 March.

== Medalists ==
Gold	Silver	Bronze
Paolo Dal Soglio; Italy	Dirk Urban; Germany	Oliver-Sven Buder; Germany

== Results ==
=== Qualification ===
Qualification performance: 19.00 (Q) or at least 12 best performers (q) advanced to the final.

Rank	Athlete	Nationality	#1	#2	#3	Result	Notes
1	Oleksandr Bagach	Ukraine	18.88	19.83		19.83	Q
2	Paolo Dal Soglio	Italy	19.71			19.71	Q
3	Manuel Martínez	Spain	18.63	19.62		19.62	Q
4	Dirk Urban	Germany	19.43			19.43	Q
5	Oliver-Sven Buder	Germany	19.33			19.33	Q
6	Markus Koistinen	Finland	19.25			19.25	Q
7	Corrado Fantini	Italy	19.24			19.24	Q
8	Mark Proctor	Great Britain	19.12			19.12	Q
9	Andriy Nimchaninov	Ukraine	19.02			19.02	Q
10	Michael Mertens	Germany	18.06	18.12	18.94	18.94	q
11	Ants Kiisa	Estonia	18.54	18.43	18.88	18.88	q
12	Vyacheslav Lykho	Russia	18.79	x	17.89	18.79	q
13	Yuriy Bilonoh	Ukraine	18.51	18.73	x	18.73	
14	Giorgio Venturi	Italy	x	18.64	18.54	18.64	
15	Alexios Leonidis	Greece	18.60	x	17.78	18.60	
16	Konstantinos Kollias	Greece	17.54	18.03	x	18.03	
17	Martin Bílek	Czech Republic	17.97	17.36	17.02	17.97	
18	Jean-Louis Lebon	France	17.82	17.69	17.42	17.82	
19	Shaun Pickering	Great Britain	17.29	17.57	x	17.57	
20	Andrei Mikhnevich	Belarus	17.57	x	x	17.57	
21	Marc Sandmeier	Switzerland	17.26	x	16.74	17.26	
22	Vladimir Vićentijević	Yugoslavia	16.56	x	16.76	16.76	
23	Zlatan Saračević	Bosnia and Herzegovina	x	15.29	15.76	15.76	

=== Final ===
Rank	Name	Nationality	#1	#2	#3	#4	#5	#6	Result	Notes
1st place, gold medalist(s)	Paolo Dal Soglio	Italy	19.27	20.15	20.01	x	20.50	x	20.50	
2nd place, silver medalist(s)	Dirk Urban	Germany	19.78	19.74	20.04	19.48	19.55	19.92	20.04	
3rd place, bronze medalist(s)	Oliver-Sven Buder	Germany	19.69	19.91	19.85	19.16	19.90	19.89	19.91	
4	Corrado Fantini	Italy	19.70	19.79	x	x	19.76	x	19.79	
5	Markus Koistinen	Finland	19.32	19.72	19.66	19.13	19.65	x	19.72	
6	Oleksandr Bagach	Ukraine	19.65	19.28	19.45	19.50	19.52	19.50	19.65	
7	Manuel Martínez	Spain	19.49	19.50	19.16	x	x	x	19.50	
8	Andriy Nimchaninov	Ukraine	19.26	18.54	19.01	18.73	18.50	x	19.26	
9	Ants Kiisa	Estonia	18.74	19.00	18.77				19.00	
10	Vyacheslav Lykho	Russia	x	18.80	18.75				18.80	
11	Michael Mertens	Germany	18.17	18.69	18.63				18.69	
12	Mark Proctor	Great Britain	x	18.53	x				18.53	
