= Vítězslav =

Vítězslav (Czech pronunciation: [ˈviːcɛslaf]) is a Czech given name. Notable people bearing the name include:

== Sport ==
- Vítězslav Bílek (born 1983), Czech ice hockey player
- Vítězslav Ďuriš (born 1954), Czech ice hockey player
- Vítězslav Gebas (born 1984), Czech slalom canoeist
- Vítězslav Hloušek (1914–?), Czech basketball player
- Vítězslav Hornig (born 1999), Czech biathlete
- Vítězslav Jankových (born 1972), Czech ice hockey player
- Vítězslav Jureček (born 1960), Czech biathlete
- Vítězslav Lahr (1929–?), Czech skier
- Vítězslav Lavička (born 1963), Czech footballer and manager
- Vítězslav Mácha (1948–2023), Czech wrestler
- Vítězslav Mooc (born 1978), Czech footballer
- Vítězslav Országh (born 1943), Czech weightlifter
- Vítězslav Sedlák (born 1991), Czech darts player
- Vítězslav Svozil (born 1933), Czech swimmer
- Vítězslav Tuma (born 1971), Czech footballer
- Vítězslav Veselý (born 1983), Czech javelin thrower

== Other ==
- Vítězslav Hálek (1835–1874), Czech writer
- Vítězslav Jandák (born 1947), Czech actor and politician
- Vítězslav Nezval (1900–1958), Czech avant-garde writer
- Vítězslav Novák (1870–1949), Czech composer
- Karel Vítězslav Mašek (1865–1927), Czech artist
- Ludvík Vítězslav Čelanský (1870–1931), Czech conductor and composer
