= 1994 European Athletics Indoor Championships – Men's shot put =

The men's shot put event at the 1994 European Athletics Indoor Championships was held in Palais Omnisports de Paris-Bercy on 11 March.

== Medalists ==
Gold	Silver	Bronze
Aleksandr Bagach; Ukraine	Dragan Perić; Independent European Participants	Pétur Guðmundsson; Iceland

== Results ==
=== Qualification ===
Qualification performance: 18.80 (Q) or at least 12 best performers (q) advanced to the final.

Rank	Athlete	Nationality	#1	#2	#3	Result	Notes
1	Aleksandr Bagach	Ukraine	20.41			20.41	Q
2	Oliver-Sven Buder	Germany	19.37			19.37	Q
3	Paolo Dal Soglio	Italy	19.35			19.35	Q
4	Yevgeniy Palchikov	Russia	18.74	19.22		19.22	Q
5	Mika Halvari	Finland	18.70	19.22		19.22	Q
6	Manuel Martínez	Spain	18.52	19.10		19.10	Q
7	Markus Koistinen	Finland	19.05			19.05	Q
8	Pétur Guðmundsson	Iceland	19.00			19.00	Q
9	Roman Virastyuk	Ukraine	18.79	18.78	18.94	18.94	Q
10	Jonny Reinhardt	Germany	18.70	18.89		18.89	Q
11	Michael Mertens	Germany	18.89			18.84	Q
12	Dragan Perić	Independent European Participants	18.80			18.80	Q
13	Viktor Bulat	Belarus	18.64	x	x	18.64	
14	Paul Edwards	Great Britain	x	18.10	18.49	18.49	
15	Gheorghe Gușet	Romania	x	18.47	x	18.47	
16	Merab Kurashvili	Georgia	18.30	18.38	18.42	18.42	
17	Martin Bílek	Czech Republic	17.63	18.00	x	18.00	
18	Corrado Fantini	Italy	x	x	17.45	17.45	
19	Serge Mouton	France	16.95	17.28	x	17.28	
20	José Luis Martínez	Spain	16.90	16.94	x	16.94	
21	Yoav Sharf	Israel	15.54	16.72	16.45	16.72	
22	Ekrem Ay	Turkey	16.64	x	x	16.64	

=== Final ===
Rank	Name	Nationality	#1	#2	#3	#4	#5	#6	Result	Notes
1st place, gold medalist(s)	Aleksandr Bagach	Ukraine	19.98	20.46	x	20.66	20.57	x	20.66	
2nd place, silver medalist(s)	Dragan Perić	Independent European Participants	20.55	x	20.23	x	x	20.52	20.55	
3rd place, bronze medalist(s)	Pétur Guðmundsson	Iceland	19.45	x	20.04	19.59	19.33	19.19	20.04	
4	Manuel Martínez	Spain	x	19.85	18.79	x	x	19.05	19.85	
5	Oliver-Sven Buder	Germany	19.66	19.38	x	18.94	19.43	19.49	19.66	
6	Paolo Dal Soglio	Italy	19.44	19.62	19.47	x	x	x	19.62	
7	Yevgeniy Palchikov	Russia	19.50	19.21	x	18.69	x	18.93	19.50	
8	Mika Halvari	Finland	19.48	x	19.41	18.87	x	x	19.48	
9	Jonny Reinhardt	Germany	19.33	19.38	19.28				19.38	
10	Markus Koistinen	Finland	19.16	19.01	18.97				19.16	
11	Roman Virastyuk	Ukraine	18.70	x	18.61				18.70	
12	Michael Mertens	Germany	18.47	18.09	18.64				18.64	
