= Athletics at the 1992 Summer Olympics – Men's shot put =

Men's shot put at the Games of the XXV Olympiad
- Pictogram for athletics
- Venue: Estadi Olímpic Lluís Companys
- Date: July 31 (qualification and final)
- Competitors: 26 from 18 nations
- Winning distance: 21.70

Medalists
1st place, gold medalist(s)		Mike Stulce; United States
2nd place, silver medalist(s)		Jim Doehring; United States
3rd place, bronze medalist(s)		Vyacheslav Lykho; Unified Team

The men's shot put was an event at the 1992 Summer Olympics in Barcelona, Spain. There were 26 participating athletes from 18 nations. The maximum number of athletes per nation had been set at 3 since the 1930 Olympic Congress. The event took place on 31 July 1992. The event was won by Mike Stulce of the United States, the nation's first victory in the men's shot put since 1968 (and 15th overall). His countryman Jim Doehring took silver. Vyacheslav Lykho of the Unified Team earned bronze, the first medal for a Soviet or former Soviet athlete in the event since 1980.

== Summary ==
Switzerland's Werner Günthör was again favored, having won the 1987 and 1991 World Championships. But he was below par and placed only fourth. American Mike Stulce was leading, having the four longest throws of the event, and winning gold with 21.70. He won over teammate Jim Doehring, who threw 20.96 in round two for the silver. Russian Vyacheslav Lykho had his two best throws in the first two rounds, getting the bronze with 20.94. The outcome of this event was a surprise to pundits and spectators alike, with Stulce's win being considered one of the most unexpected upsets of the 1992 games.

== Background ==
This was the 22nd appearance of the event, which is one of 12 athletics events to have been held at every Summer Olympics. The returning finalists from the 1988 Games were defending champion Ulf Timmermann of East Germany (now representing unified Germany), bronze medalist (and 1984 finalist) Werner Günthör of Switzerland, fourth-place finisher (and 1976 gold medalist and 1980 bronze medalist) Udo Beyer of East Germany, sixth-place finisher Gert Weil of Chile, seventh-place finisher (and 1984 gold medalist) Alessandro Andrei of Italy, and eleventh-place finisher Jim Doehring of the United States. Günthör had won the 1987 and 1991 world championships; as in 1988, he was favored over the three men who had previously won the event. American Randy Barnes, the silver medalist in 1988, had set the world record in 1990 (a record that still stands as of 2020), but was suspended and could not compete.

Bosnia and Herzegovina and Qatar each made their debut in the men's shot put, one Yugoslav competitor competed as an Independent Olympic Participant, and some former Soviet republics competed as the Unified Team. The United States made its 21st appearance, most of any nation, having missed only the boycotted 1980 Games.

== Competition format ==
The competition used the two-round format introduced in 1936, with the qualifying round completely separate from the divided final. In qualifying, each athlete received three attempts; those recording a mark of at least 19.80 metres advanced to the final. If fewer than 12 athletes achieved that distance, the top 12 would advance. The results of the qualifying round were then ignored. Finalists received three throws each, with the top eight competitors receiving an additional three attempts. The best distance among those six throws counted.

== Records ==
The standing world and Olympic records prior to the 1992 Games were as follows.

World record	Randy Barnes (USA)	23.12	Los Angeles, United States	22 May 1988
Olympic record	Ulf Timmermann (GDR)	22.47	Seoul, South Korea	23 September 1988

No new world or Olympic records were set during the competition.

== Schedule ==
All times are Central European Summer Time (UTC+2)

Date	Time	Round
Friday, 31 July 1992	10:00; 18:55	Qualifying; Final

== Results ==
=== Qualifying ===
Rank	Athlete	Nation	1	2	3	Distance	Notes
1	Jim Doehring	United States	19.77	20.53	—	20.53	Q
2	Werner Günthör	Switzerland	20.50	—	—	20.50	Q
3	Luciano Zerbini	Italy	20.25	—	—	20.25	Q
4	Dragan Perić	Independent Olympic Participants	X	18.35	20.24	20.24	Q
5	Vyacheslav Lykho	Unified Team	X	20.24	—	20.24	Q
6	Mike Stulce	United States	20.18	—	—	20.18	Q
7	Aleksandr Klimenko	Unified Team	19.33	20.16	—	20.16	Q
8	Alessandro Andrei	Italy	19.51	19.51	20.14	20.14	Q
9	Ulf Timmermann	Germany	19.62	19.73	19.93	19.93	Q
10	Klaus Bodenmüller	Austria	19.56	19.86	—	19.86	Q
11	Ron Backes	United States	19.71	19.35	X	19.71	q
12	Sören Tallhem	Sweden	18.41	19.18	19.65	19.65	q
13	Gert Weil	Chile	18.51	19.04	19.41	19.41	
14	Pétur Guðmundsson	Iceland	18.46	18.76	19.15	19.15	
15	Paul Edwards	Great Britain	18.57	19.03	18.80	19.03	
16	Andriy Nemchaninov	Unified Team	18.91	18.98	X	18.98	
17	Gheorghe Guşet	Romania	18.41	X	18.96	18.96	
18	Kent Larsson	Sweden	18.46	X	18.56	18.56	
19	Udo Beyer	Germany	18.47	X	X	18.47	
20	Antero Paljakka	Finland	18.42	X	X	18.42	
21	Khaled Al-Khalidi	Saudi Arabia	17.56	17.72	17.50	17.72	
22	Victor Costello	Ireland	15.99	17.15	X	17.15	
23	Paul Quirke	Ireland	16.71	17.01	16.99	17.01	
24	Bilal Saad Mubarak	Qatar	16.91	16.98	X	16.98	
25	Peter Dajia	Canada	X	X	16.81	16.81	
26	Zlatan Saračević	Bosnia and Herzegovina	X	15.12	16.38	16.38	
—	Kalman Konya	Germany	DNS				

=== Final ===
The final was held on July 31, 1992.

Rank	Athlete	Nation	1	2	3	4	5	6	Distance
1st place, gold medalist(s)	Mike Stulce	United States	21.49	21.58	X	21.11	21.70	X	21.70
2nd place, silver medalist(s)	Jim Doehring	United States	19.89	20.96	X	20.17	X	20.03	20.96
3rd place, bronze medalist(s)	Vyacheslav Lykho	Unified Team	20.93	20.94	20.79	X	19.99	20.35	20.94
4	Werner Günthör	Switzerland	19.74	20.01	20.27	20.85	X	20.91	20.91
5	Ulf Timmermann	Germany	20.12	20.03	19.83	20.49	20.10	20.38	20.49
6	Klaus Bodenmüller	Austria	20.13	20.19	20.48	20.39	19.81	19.92	20.48
7	Dragan Perić	Independent Olympic Participants	X	19.90	19.59	20.07	X	20.32	20.32
8	Aleksandr Klimenko	Unified Team	X	20.23	X	X	X	20.14	20.23
9	Luciano Zerbini	Italy	19.88	19.75	19.54	Did not advance			19.88
10	Ron Backes	United States	19.75	X	X	Did not advance			19.75
11	Alessandro Andrei	Italy	19.46	19.53	19.62	Did not advance			19.62
12	Sören Tallhem	Sweden	18.31	19.32	X	Did not advance			19.32

== See also ==
- 1990 Men's European Championships Shot Put
- 1991 Men's World Championship Shot Put
- 1993 Men's World Championship Shot Put
