= 1993 IAAF World Indoor Championships – Men's shot put =

The men's shot put event at the 1993 IAAF World Indoor Championships was held on 12 March.

== Medalists ==
Gold	Silver	Bronze
Mike Stulce; United States	Jim Doehring; United States	Oleksandr Bagach; Ukraine

== Results ==
=== Qualification ===
Rank	Name	Nationality	#1	#2	#3	Result	Notes
1	Mike Stulce	United States	20.56			20.56	Q
2	Oleksandr Bagach	Ukraine	x	20.21		20.21	Q
3	Oleksandr Klymenko	Ukraine	19.74			19.74	Q
4	Sergey Smirnov	Russia	19.38	19.64		19.64	Q
5	Jim Doehring	United States	19.21	19.56		19.56	Q
6	Paolo Dal Soglio	Italy	x	18.37	19.49	19.49	Q
7	Luciano Zerbini	Italy	19.32	19.09	x	19.32	Q
8	Oliver-Sven Buder	Germany	19.12	18.57	x	19.12	Q
9	Paul Edwards	Great Britain	17.63	18.23	18.11	18.23	Q
10	Markus Koistinen	Finland	17.90	18.20	x	18.20	Q
11	Viktor Bulat	Belarus	18.18	17.74	18.01	18.18	Q
12	Gheorghe Gușet	Romania	17.84	18.09	x	18.09	Q
13	John Minns	Australia	17.96	17.88	18.08	18.08	NR
14	Kent Larsson	Sweden	17.51	17.70	18.05	18.05	
15	Rob Venier	Canada	17.14	17.36	x	17.36	

=== Final ===
Rank	Name	Nationality	#1	#2	#3	#4	#5	#6	Result	Notes
1st place, gold medalist(s)	Mike Stulce	United States	20.81	20.40	21.05	20.57	21.27	x	21.27	
2nd place, silver medalist(s)	Jim Doehring	United States	21.08	x	x	x	x	20.34	21.08	
3rd place, bronze medalist(s)	Oleksandr Bagach	Ukraine	20.50	20.30	20.68	20.83	x	x	20.83	
4	Oleksandr Klymenko	Ukraine	20.16	20.58	20.20	20.28	x	x	20.58	
5	Paolo Dal Soglio	Italy	x	x	19.44	19.40	19.74	19.51	19.74	
6	Luciano Zerbini	Italy	19.68	19.26	x	19.23	19.29	19.66	19.68	
7	Sergey Smirnov	Russia	18.99	19.59	x	x	19.49	x	19.59	
8	Oliver-Sven Buder	Germany	18.81	19.03	18.86	x	18.67	18.65	19.03	
9	Paul Edwards	Great Britain	x	17.87	18.32				18.32	
10	Viktor Bulat	Belarus	17.53	x	18.17				18.17	
11	Markus Koistinen	Finland	17.87	18.00	17.86				18.00	
	Gheorghe Gușet	Romania	x	x	x				NM	
