= 1985 European Athletics Indoor Championships – Men's shot put =

The men's shot put event at the 1985 European Athletics Indoor Championships was held on 3 March.

== Results ==
Rank	Name	Nationality	#1	#2	#3	#4	#5	#6	Result	Notes
1st place, gold medalist(s)	Remigius Machura	Czechoslovakia	21.18	21.00	x	21.45	21.30	21.74	21.74	
2nd place, silver medalist(s)	Ulf Timmermann	East Germany	21.02	21.26	21.12	21.38	21.17	21.44	21.44	
3rd place, bronze medalist(s)	Werner Günthör	Switzerland	21.23	20.53	x	20.93	x	20.54	21.23	
4	Jānis Bojārs	Soviet Union	19.66	x	19.79	20.03	x	19.84	20.03	
5	Marco Montelatici	Italy	19.17	19.51	19.63	x	x	19.64	19.64	
6	Knut Hjeltnes	Norway	19.48	19.19	18.70	19.54	19.33	x	19.54	
7	Helmut Krieger	Poland	18.76	19.38	19.39	x	x	19.29	19.39	
8	Richard Navara	Czechoslovakia	19.21	19.01	18.36	x	x	18.42	19.21	
9	Georgi Todorov	Bulgaria	18.50	18.90	x				18.90	
10	Karsten Stolz	West Germany	17.83	18.06	18.48				18.48	
11	Anders Skärvstrand	Sweden	18.43	18.07	18.43				18.43	
12	Georg Andersen	Norway	x	17.77	17.76				17.77	
	Dimitrios Koutsoukis	Greece							DNS	
