= Athletics at the 1991 Summer Universiade – Men's shot put =

The men's shot put event at the 1991 Summer Universiade was held at the Don Valley Stadium in Sheffield on 21 July 1991.

== Results ==
Rank	Athlete	Nationality	#1	#2	#3	#4	#5	#6	Result	Notes
1st place, gold medalist(s)	Aleksandr Klimenko	Soviet Union	19.35	19.05	19.07	19.06	x	18.92	19.35	
2nd place, silver medalist(s)	Matt Simson	Great Britain	17.93	17.60	19.07	18.27	x	x	19.07	
3rd place, bronze medalist(s)	Jordan Reynolds	United States							19.01	
4	Simon Williams	Great Britain	18.81	17.78	17.77	x	x	17.82	18.81	
5	Vladimir Yaryshkin	Soviet Union							18.01	
6	C.J. Hunter	United States							17.81	
7	Antero Paljakka	Finland							17.73	
8	Peter Daiia	Canada							16.76	
9	Scott Cappos	Canada							15.54	
10	Naeima Khadjavi	Iran							11.78	
