= 1988 European Athletics Indoor Championships – Men's shot put =

The men's shot put event at the 1988 European Athletics Indoor Championships was held on 5 March.

== Results ==
Rank	Name	Nationality	#1	#2	#3	#4	#5	#6	Result	Notes
1st place, gold medalist(s)	Remigius Machura	Czechoslovakia	19.00	20.44	21.42	x	20.07	x	21.42	
2nd place, silver medalist(s)	Karsten Stolz	West Germany	20.09	20.14	x	20.00	20.22	20.09	20.22	
3rd place, bronze medalist(s)	Georgi Todorov	Bulgaria	19.59	19.98	19.77	x	19.71	19.79	19.98	
4	Klaus Bodenmüller	Austria	19.64	19.70	19.64	x	19.63	x	19.70	
5	Karel Šula	Czechoslovakia	x	19.66	x	19.03	19.41	19.40	19.66	
6	Georg Andersen	Norway	19.56	x	18.98	x	x	x	19.56	
7	Richard Navara	Czechoslovakia	19.32	18.96	18.82	18.53	19.10	19.03	19.32	
8	Dimitrios Koutsoukis	Greece	19.25	18.99	x	19.03	19.21	x	19.25	
9	Radoslav Despotov	Bulgaria	18.69	19.23	x				19.23	
10	Zsigmond Ladányi	Hungary	18.98	19.17	x				19.17	
11	László Szabó	Hungary	18.77	x	18.72				18.77	
