= Athletics at the 1989 Summer Universiade – Men's shot put =

The men's shot put event at the 1989 Summer Universiade was held at the Wedaustadion in Duisburg with the final on 30 August 1989.

== Results ==
Rank	Athlete	Nationality	Result	Notes
1st place, gold medalist(s)	Lars Arvid Nilsen	Norway	20.67	
2nd place, silver medalist(s)	Mike Stulce	United States	20.58	
3rd place, bronze medalist(s)	Kalman Konya	West Germany	20.37	
4	Karsten Stolz	West Germany	20.13	
5	Ventislav Khristov	Bulgaria	19.15	
6	Dragan Perić	Yugoslavia	19.14	
7	Oliver-Sven Buder	East Germany	19.13	
8	Art McDermott	United States	18.60	
9	Mikhaylo Kulish	Soviet Union	18.23	
10	Simon Williams	Great Britain	17.66	
11	Kent Larsson	Sweden	17.17	
12	Zsigmond Ladányi	Hungary	16.66	
