= Bělčice =

- Town
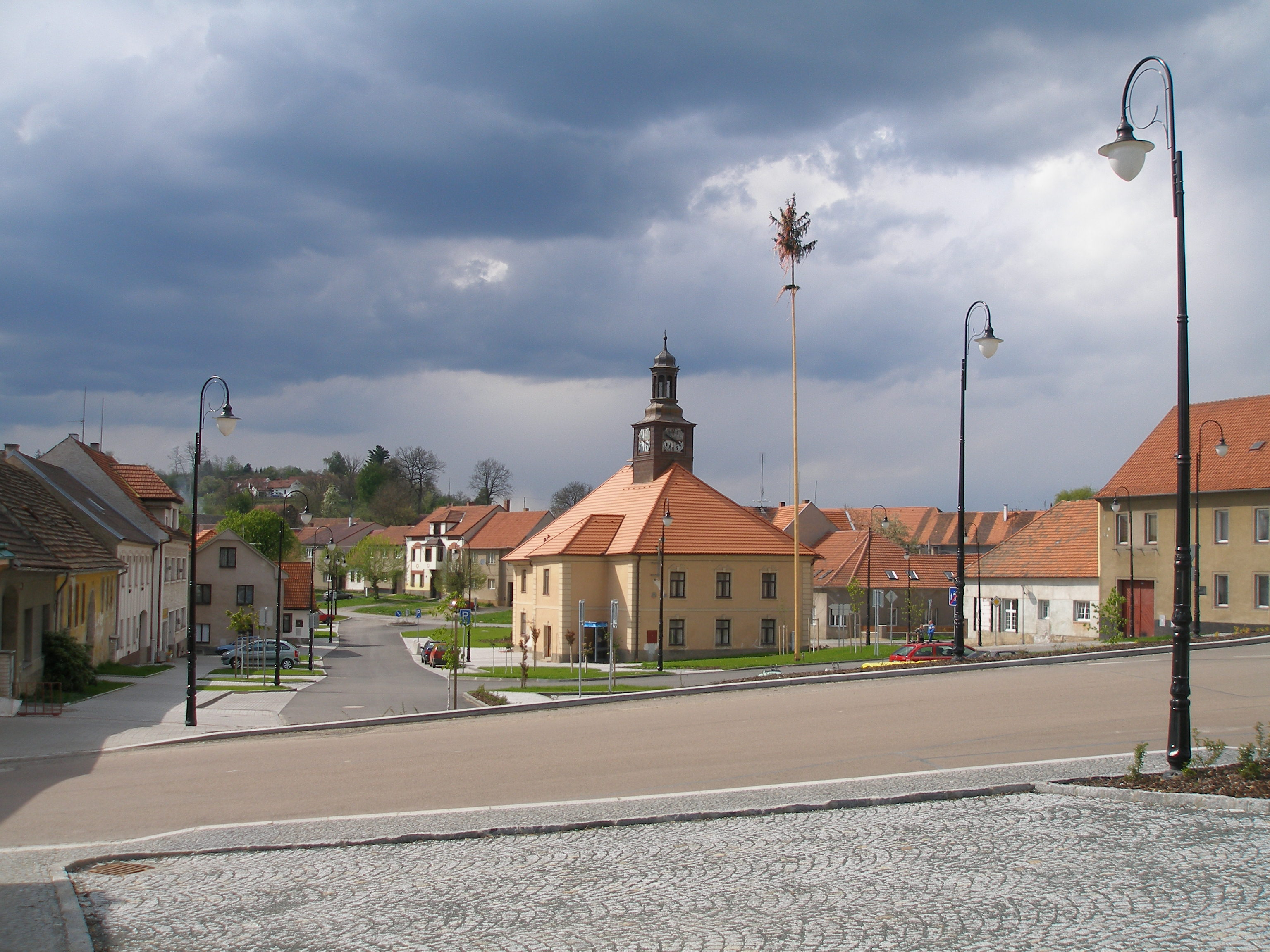
- Town square with the town hall

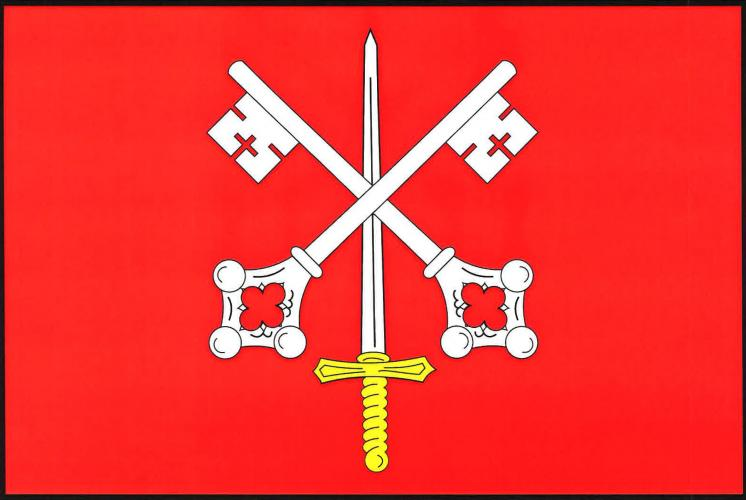
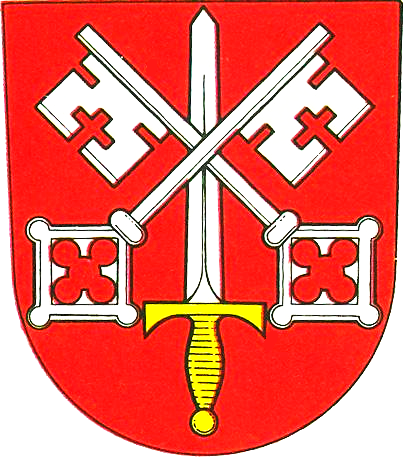
- Flag Coat of arms

- Location in the Czech Republic
- Coordinates: 49°30′9″N 13°52′33″E
- Country: Czech Republic
- Region: South Bohemian
- District: Strakonice
- First mentioned: 1243

Area
  - Total: 34.33 km^{2} (13.25 sq mi)
- Elevation: 526 m (1,726 ft)

Population (2026-01-01)
  - Total: 1,031
  - Density: 30.03/km^{2} (77.78/sq mi)
- Time zone: UTC+1 (CET)
  - Summer (DST): UTC+2 (CEST)
- Postal code: 387 43
- Website: www.belcice.cz

Bělčice (Czech pronunciation: [ˈbjɛltʃɪtsɛ]) is a town in Strakonice District in the South Bohemian Region of the Czech Republic. It has about 1,000 inhabitants.

== Administrative division ==
Bělčice consists of seven municipal parts (in brackets population according to the 2021 census):

- Bělčice (677)
- Hostišovice (50)
- Podruhlí (39)
- Tisov (51)
- Újezdec (52)
- Záhrobí (65)
- Závišín (63)

== Etymology ==
The name Bělčice is derived from the personal name Bělec or Bílek, meaning "the village of Bělec's/Bílek's people".

== Geography ==
Bělčice is located about 27 kilometres (17 mi) north of Strakonice and 43 km (27 mi) southeast of Plzeň. It lies on the border between the Blatná Uplands and Benešov Uplands. The highest point is the hill Kněžská hora at 565 metres (1,854 ft) above sea level. The area is rich in fishponds and minor streams.

== History ==
The first written mention of Bělčice is from 1243. At the end of the 15th century, the village was promoted to a town. Bělčice was badly damaged during the Thirty Years' War and ceased to be a town. In 1898, it became a town again.

== Demographics ==
Historical population

Year	Pop.	±%
1869	2,496	—
1880	2,585	+3.6%
1890	2,438	−5.7%
1900	2,308	−5.3%
1910	2,366	+2.5%

Year	Pop.	±%
1921	2,249	−4.9%
1930	2,135	−5.1%
1950	1,614	−24.4%
1961	1,586	−1.7%
1970	1,410	−11.1%

Year	Pop.	±%
1980	1,275	−9.6%
1991	1,093	−14.3%
2001	991	−9.3%
2011	1,005	+1.4%
2021	997	−0.8%

Source: Censuses

== Transport ==
Bělčice is located on the railway line Strakonice–Beroun.

== Sights ==
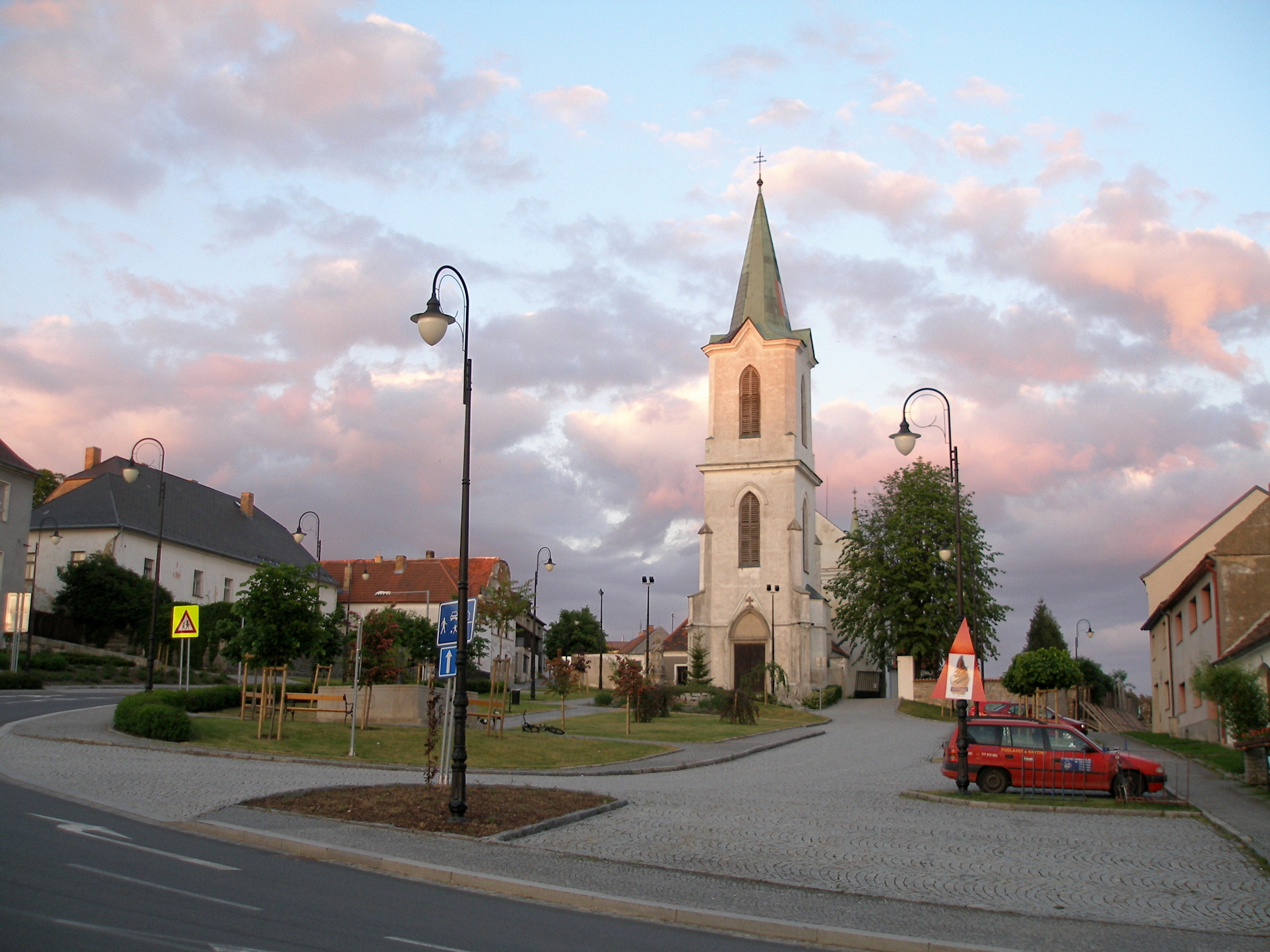
Church of Saints Peter and Paul at the town square

The main landmark of Bělčice is the Church of Saints Peter and Paul. It was built in the late Romanesque style around 1240. The Gothic presbytery was built in the beginning of the 14th century. Next to the church is a separate neo-Gothic bell tower from 1863.
