= Bílkovice =

- Municipality
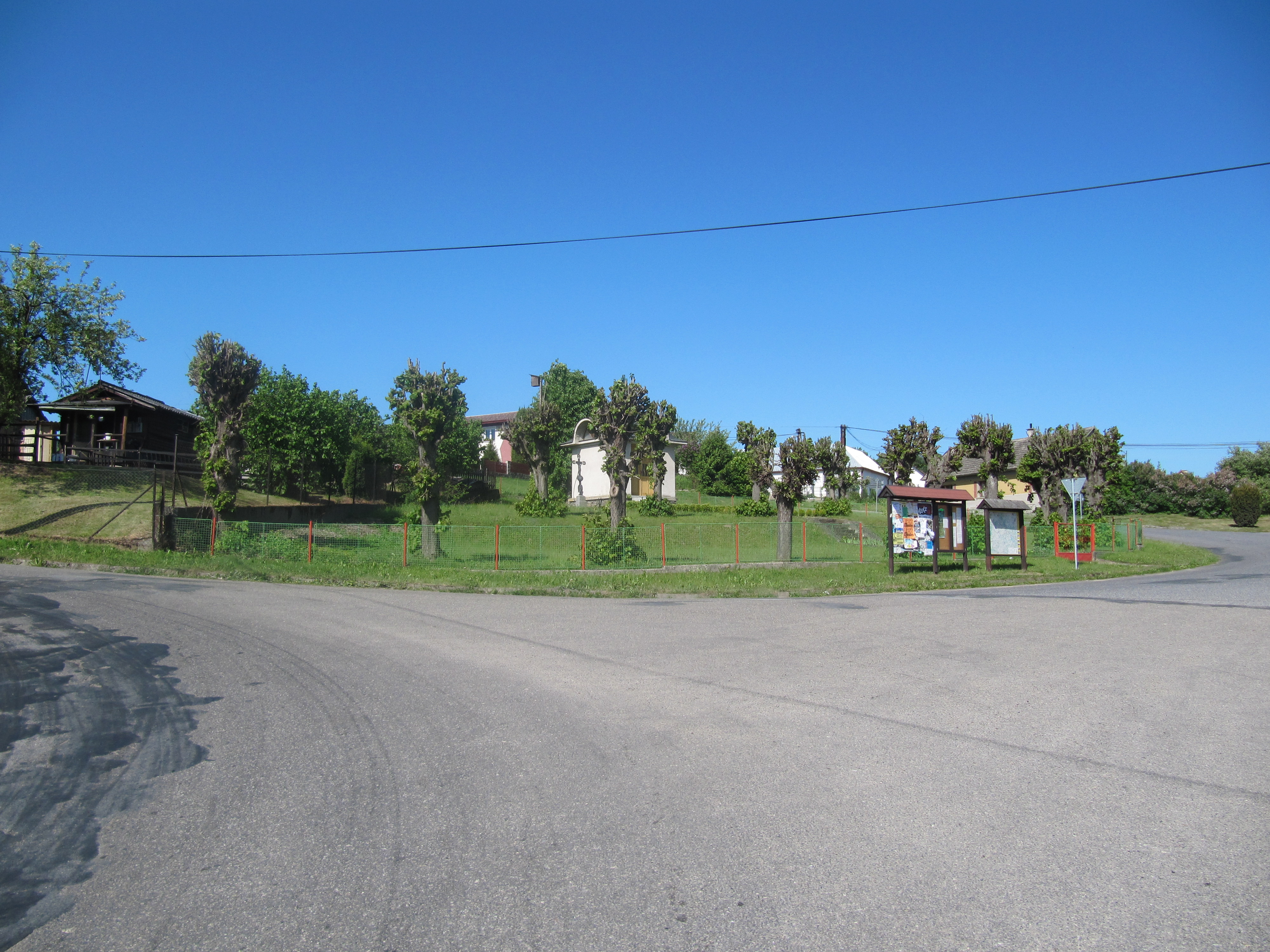
- Centre of Bílkovice

- Flag Coat of arms

- Location in the Czech Republic
- Coordinates: 49°45′35″N 14°51′40″E
- Country: Czech Republic
- Region: Central Bohemian
- District: Benešov
- First mentioned: 1420

Area
  - Total: 5.78 km^{2} (2.23 sq mi)
- Elevation: 358 m (1,175 ft)

Population (2026-01-01)
  - Total: 220
  - Density: 38/km^{2} (99/sq mi)
- Time zone: UTC+1 (CET)
  - Summer (DST): UTC+2 (CEST)
- Postal codes: 256 01, 257 26
- Website: www.bilkovice.cz

Bílkovice is a municipality and village in Benešov District in the Central Bohemian Region of the Czech Republic. It has about 200 inhabitants.

== Administrative division ==
Bílkovice consists of three municipal parts (in brackets population according to the 2021 census):

- Bílkovice (188)
- Moravsko (2)
- Takonín (41)

== Etymology ==
The name is derived from the surname Bílek, meaning "the village of Bílek's people".

== Geography ==
Bílkovice is located about 13 kilometres (8 mi) east of Benešov and 40 km (25 mi) southeast of Prague. It lies on the border between the Benešov Uplands and Vlašim Uplands. The highest point is at 455 m (1,493 ft) above sea level. The Chotýšanka River flows through the municipality. The brook Divišovský potok flows through the village of Bílkovice and then joins the Chotýšanka.

== History ==
The first written mention of Bílkovice is from 1420. Takonín was first mentioned in 1250 and Moravsko in 1380.

== Demographics ==
Historical population

Year	Pop.	±%
1869	589	—
1880	565	−4.1%
1890	534	−5.5%
1900	510	−4.5%
1910	465	−8.8%

Year	Pop.	±%
1921	462	−0.6%
1930	421	−8.9%
1950	347	−17.6%
1961	342	−1.4%
1970	306	−10.5%

Year	Pop.	±%
1980	247	−19.3%
1991	206	−16.6%
2001	198	−3.9%
2011	196	−1.0%
2021	231	+17.9%

Source: Censuses

== Transport ==
There are no railways or major roads passing through the municipality.

== Sights ==
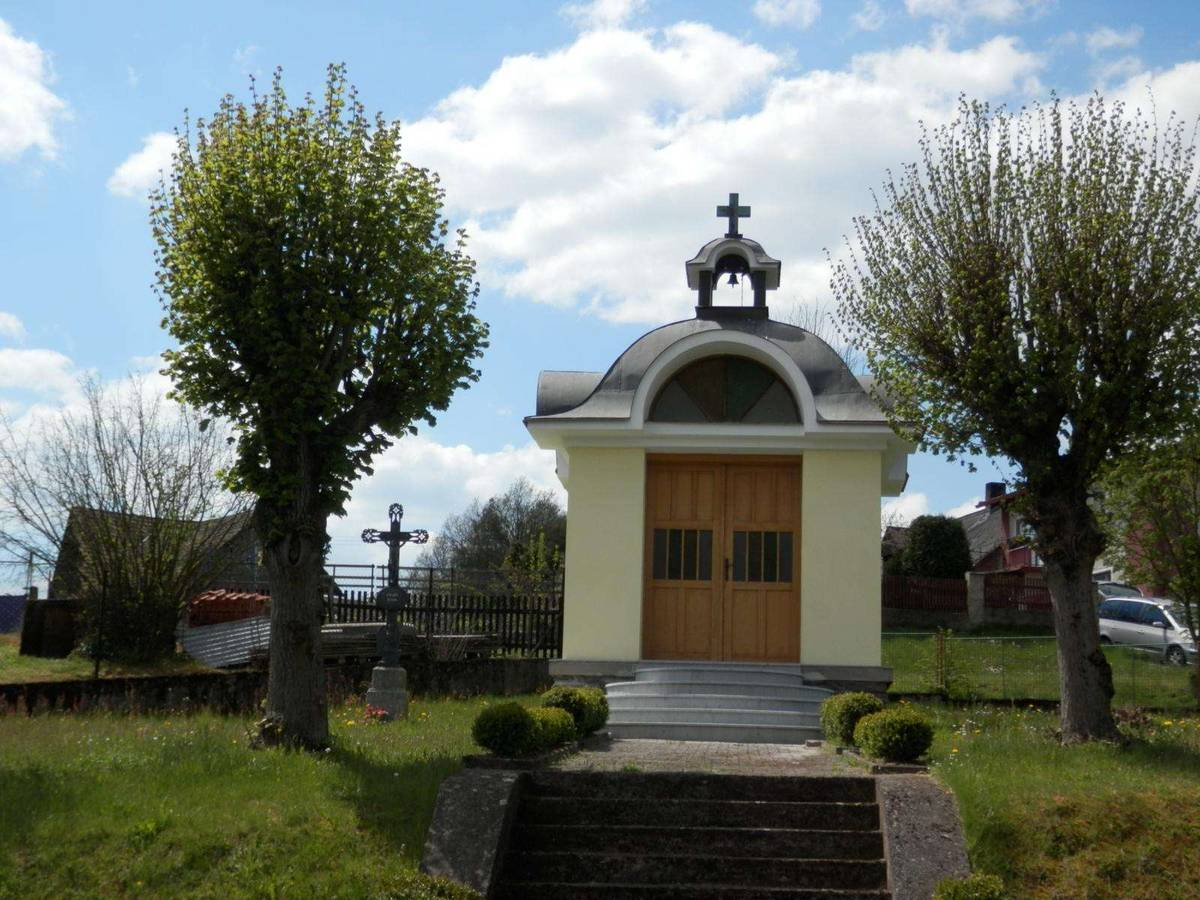
Chapel of Saint Anthony of Padua

There are no protected cultural monuments in the municipality. A landmark of the centre of Bílkovice is the Chapel of Saint Anthony of Padua.
