= Bílek =

Bílek (feminine: Bílková) is a Czech surname. It was derived from the Czech word bílý ('white') and probably referred to the colour of the skin, hair or beard. Notable people with the surname include:

- Alexander Bílek (1941–2017), Czech athlete
- Dagmar Bílková (born 1967), Czech-Slovak sport shooter
- František Bílek (1872–1941), Czech sculptor
- Hynek Bílek (born 1981), Czech ice dancer
- István Bilek (1932–2010), Hungarian chess grandmaster
- Jaroslav Bílek (born 1971), Czech cyclist
- Jiří Bílek (born 1983), Czech footballer
- Marek Bílek (born 1973), Czech discus thrower
- Marcela Bilek (born 1968), Australian physicist
- Martin Bílek (1973–2000), Czech shot putter
- Michal Bílek (born 1965), Czech football player and manager
- Roman Bílek (born 1967), Czech race walker
- Rosa Junck, born Růžena Bílková (1850–1929), Czech Esperantist and educator
- Vítězslav Bílek (born 1983), Czech ice hockey player

== See also ==
- Gyuláné Krizsán-Bilek (born 1938), Hungarian chess master
