= Simon Williams (shot putter) =

British shot putter and discus thrower

Personal information
- Nationality: British (English)
- Born: 17 October 1967 (age 58) Edmonton, London, England
- Height: 189 cm (6 ft 2 in)
- Weight: 110 kg (243 lb)

Sport
- Sport: Athletics
- Event: Discus throw / Shot put
- Club: Enfield Harriers
Medal record
athletics
Representing England
Commonwealth Games
Gold medal – first place	1990 Auckland	Shot put

Simon Alexander Williams (born 17 October 1967) is a male British former shot putter and discus thrower. He was the gold medallist in the shot put at the 1990 Commonwealth Games. He also represented Great Britain in the discus at the 1991 World Championships in Athletics and the 1992 Summer Olympics. He was a two-time champion in the shot put at the AAA Championships (1988 and 1989). He set personal bests of 19.17 m (62 ft 10 1/2 in) for the shot put and 61.14 m (200 ft 7 in) for the discus. He was the 1991 shot put champion at the NCAA Men's Outdoor Track and Field Championships, competing for Louisiana State University.

== Biography ==
Born in Edmonton, London, he began competing in throwing events as a teenager as a young member of Enfield and Haringey Athletic Club. In 1984 he was the champion in the shot put in the under-17s AAA section (outdoors and indoors) and the intermediate category champion at the English Schools Championships. He improved the following year to take the discus throw title at the AAA Outdoor Junior Championships, the shot put at the under-19s English Schools competition. He took a AAA indoor title in the shot put in 1986 and also retained his schools title. Internationally, he competed in the discus at the 1985 European Athletics Junior Championships, being eliminated in the qualifying round. He also competed in the shot put at the inaugural 1986 World Junior Championships in Athletics, placing twelfth overall.

Williams won his first senior national title in the shot put at the 1988 AAA Championships. He repeated that feat in 1989, defeating runner-up Matt Simson by nearly a metre. After a two-time All-American stint for the SMU Mustangs track and field team in 1988, Williams transferred to Louisiana State University in 1989, competing for their LSU Tigers team. In 1990 he was beaten to the AAA shot put title by Paul Edwards, but also made his first discus throw podium there by coming runner-up to Abi Ekoku. He was England's selection for the shot put at the 1990 Commonwealth Games in Auckland. Despite having lost in national competition, he topped the rankings at the games to win the shot put gold medal with a throw of 18.54 m (60 ft 9 3/4 in) (Edwards was third).

At the 1991 NCAA Men's Outdoor Track and Field Championships, Williams was an unexpected victor in the shot put, taking the title for Louisiana with his throw of 18.69 m (61 ft 3 3/4 in) – the shortest winning mark since 1959. Williams had set a lifetime best of 19.17 m (62 ft 10 1/2 in) in the shot put to win the Southeastern Conference Championships earlier that year. Turning to the discus, he was the top national thrower at the AAA Championships that year, although second to Austria's Werner Reiterer. This brought him his senior debut for Great Britain at the 1991 World Championships in Athletics. He through a personal best of 60.68 m (199 ft 3/4 in) at the event in Tokyo, but this was not enough to progress to the final.

He was beaten nationally at the 1992 AAA Championships, finishing behind Edwards in the shot and behind Ekoku in the discus. Still, his lifetime best discus throw of 61.14 m (200 ft 7 in) in Baton Rouge that April gained him a place on the British team for the Barcelona Olympics. He was well down on his best there, however, managing only 53.12 m (174 ft 3 1/4 in) in the qualifying round.

After his Olympic performance, he never again reached the same standard. He did not compete in the 1993 season and did not rank nationally at the AAA Championships in 1994 either. He focused mainly on discus after this point: he was third at the 1995 AAA Championships and runner-up to Robert Weir at the 1996 event, which was his final podium finish at the competition.

== Personal bests ==
- Shot put – 19.17 m (62 ft 10 1/2 in) (1991)
- Discus throw – 61.14 m (200 ft 7 in) (1992)

== National titles ==
- Shot put
  - AAA Championships: 1988, 1989

== International competitions ==
Year	Competition	Venue	Position	Event	Notes
Representing the Great Britain and England
1985	European Junior Championships	Cottbus, East Germany	15th	Discus throw	47.24 m
1986	World Junior Championships	Athens, Greece	12th	Shot put	15.87 m
1986	World Junior Championships	Athens, Greece	18th (q)	Discus throw	46.95 m
1989	Universiade	Duisburg, West Germany	10th	Shot put	17.66 m
1989	World Cup	Barcelona, Spain	5th	Shot put	18.49 m
1990	Commonwealth Games	Auckland, New Zealand	1st	Shot put	18.54 m
1991	Universiade	Sheffield, United Kingdom	4th	Shot put	18.81 m
1991	World Championships	Tokyo, Japan	16th (q)	Discus throw	60.68 m
1992	Olympic Games	Barcelona, Spain	28th (q)	Discus throw	53.12 m
