= 1989 IAAF World Indoor Championships – Men's shot put =

The men's shot put event at the 1989 IAAF World Indoor Championships was held at the Budapest Sportcsarnok in Budapest on 4 March.

== Results ==
Rank	Name	Nationality	#1	#2	#3	#4	#5	#6	Result	Notes
1st place, gold medalist(s)	Ulf Timmermann	East Germany	20.78	21.75	21.70	21.16	x	21.14	21.75	
2nd place, silver medalist(s)	Randy Barnes	United States	18.16	19.77	19.72	x	x	21.28	21.28	
3rd place, bronze medalist(s)	Georg Andersen	Norway	20.07	20.49	20.65	20.98	20.54	20.72	20.98	NR
4	Augie Wolf	United States							20.82	
5	Karsten Stolz	West Germany							20.11	
6	Gert Weil	Chile							19.91	
7	Alessandro Andrei	Italy							19.77	
8	Janne Ronkainen	Finland							19.25	
9	Karel Šula	Czechoslovakia							19.24	
10	Paul Ruiz	Cuba							18.80	
11	Pétur Guðmundsson	Iceland							18.31	
