= Matt Simson =

British shot putter

Personal information
- Nationality: British (English)
- Born: 28 May 1970 (age 56)

Sport
- Sport: Athletics
- Event: Shot put
- Club: Thurrock Harriers
Medal record
Athletics
Representing England
Commonwealth Games
Gold medal – first place	1994 Victoria	Shot put
Representing Great Britain
Summer Universiade
Silver medal – second place	1991 Sheffield	Shot put

Matthew Simson (born 28 May 1970) is a male British former shot putter. He was the gold medallist in the event at the 1994 Commonwealth Games, which he won with his career best throw of 19.49 m (63 ft 11 1/4 in).

Simson was a bronze medallist at the European Athletics Junior Championships in 1989 and won the silver at the 1991 Summer Universiade. At senior level he represented Great Britain at the 1997 IAAF World Indoor Championships and the 1989 European Athletics Indoor Championships. He studied at the University of Florida and competed for the Florida Gators while there.

== Biography ==
Simson began to compete in shot put as a teenager at Thurrock Harriers in Grays, Essex. He won the junior (under-15s) category at the 1984 English Schools Championships, was the intermediate (under-17s) champion in 1986, then succeeded Simon Williams to the under-19s English Schools' title in 1987. He established himself as the top young shot putter of his generation, winning four straight titles at the AAA Junior Championships and three straight AAA Junior Indoor titles. He set national indoor age bests for 16-year-olds in 1987 and 17-year-olds in 1988. In international competition he placed seventh at the 1987 European Athletics Junior Championships before improving to take the bronze medal at the 1989 edition. He was fifth in the shot put at the 1988 World Junior Championships in Athletics.

Growing to a height of 6 ft 6 in (1.98 m), Simson established himself at senior level in the 1989 season. That year he was the winner at the AAA Indoor Championships with a throw of 18.21 m (59 ft 8 3/4 in). He was also runner-up to Paul Edwards at the UK Athletics Championships and second to Simon Williams at the AAA Championships. He also made his senior international debut, competing at the 1989 European Athletics Indoor Championships where he came in eleventh place. He improved his personal best to 18.52 m (60 ft 9 in) in 1990.

He began studying in the United States at the University of Florida and competed athletically for their Florida Gators team. He placed third at the NCAA Men's Indoor Track and Field Championship in 1991, throwing a best of 18.98 m (62 ft 3 in). He achieved a new best of 19.23 m (63 ft 1 in) in Tallahassee in May and placed in the top five at the Bislett Games and Athletissima meet in Europe that summer. He was over nineteen metres again at the 1991 Summer Universiade held in Sheffield and was the silver medallist behind Soviet Union's Aleksandr Klimenko. He was second to Paul Edwards at both the AAA and UK Championships that year.

He missed most of the 1992 season, bar a pair of third-place finishes at the AAA Championships and the 1992 European Athletics U23 Cup. He returned in 1993, starting with a fifth-place finish at the NCAA Indoor meet. His best throw that year was 18.50 m (60 ft 8 1/4 in) at the Bislett Games in Norway. He resumed his position as runner-up behind Edwards at the UK Championships but managed to defeat his national rival at the AAA Championships, taking his first senior title at the event.

The 1994 season marked the peak of Simson's career. He won the Southeastern Conference Championship title for the Florida Gators before being selected to represent England at the 1994 Commonwealth Games. At the games in Victoria, Canada, he excelled with a throw of 19.49 m (63 ft 11 1/4 in) in the final – a career best. This meant he edged Courtney Ireland into second to win the gold medal. He completed his final year of college in Florida in 1995, with a highlight including a win at the Florida Relays.

Simson was the top Briton at the 1996 British Grand Prix, placing third overall with a season's best of 18.95 m (62 ft 2 in). He claimed the second AAA title of his career by beating Shaun Pickering by a margin of 19 cm. He also placed fourth at the London Grand Prix that year. In 1997 his best efforts came indoors. After an indoor career best of 19.41 m (63 ft 8 in) in Florida, he won the UK trials to qualify for the 1997 IAAF World Indoor Championships. He failed to follow up on his Commonwealth success, however, and was eliminated in the qualifying rounds of the global tournament. Outdoors he was runner-up at the UK Championships to Shaun Pickering – the contest marked the first time two athletes had thrown over nineteen metres at the competition. This proved to be his last major outing at national level and he retired from professional athletics in 1998.

== Personal bests ==
- Shot put outdoor – 19.49 m (63 ft 11 1/4 in) (1994)
- Shot put indoor – 19.41 m (63 ft 8 in) (1997)

== National titles ==
- Shot put
  - AAA Indoor Championships: 1989
  - AAA Championships: 1993, 1996

== International competitions ==
Year	Competition	Venue	Position	Event	Notes
Representing the United Kingdom and England
1987	European Junior Championships	Birmingham, United Kingdom	7th	Shot put	16.49 m
1988	World Junior Championships	Greater Sudbury, Canada	5th	Shot put	17.11 m
1989	European Junior Championships	Varaždin, Croatia	3rd	Shot put	18.11 m
1989	European Indoor Championships	The Hague, Netherlands	11th	Shot put	17.38 m
1990	Commonwealth Games	Auckland, New Zealand	9th	Shot put	16.89 m
1991	Universiade	Sheffield, United Kingdom	2nd	Shot put	19.07 m
1992	European Athletics U23 Cup	Gateshead, United Kingdom	3rd	Shot put	18.22 m
1994	Commonwealth Games	Victoria, Canada	1st	Shot put	19.49 m
1997	World Indoor Championships	Paris, France	20th	Shot put	18.30 m
