= Athletics at the 1990 Commonwealth Games – Men's shot put =

Men's shot put at the Commonwealth Games

The men's shot put event at the 1990 Commonwealth Games was held at the Mount Smart Stadium in Auckland.

== Results ==
Rank	Name	Nationality	#1	#2	#3	#4	#5	#6	Result	Notes
1st place, gold medalist(s)	Simon Williams	England	18.54	17.80	17.41	17.72	x	17.67	18.54	
2nd place, silver medalist(s)	Adewale Olukoju	Nigeria	17.27	17.84	17.05	17.67	18.48	17.74	18.48	
3rd place, bronze medalist(s)	Paul Edwards	Wales	18.12	17.96	18.17	17.23	x	?	18.17	
4	Werner Reiterer	Australia	17.78	x	17.36	17.57	x	16.95	17.78	
5	John Minns	Australia	16.35	17.12	17.49	16.92	x	–	17.49	
6	Abi Ekoku	England	16.70	17.00	16.85	x	17.45	?	17.45	
7	Lorne Hilton	Canada							17.06	
8	Steve Whyte	Scotland	17.00	16.83	x	x	x	x	17.00	
9	Matt Simson	England							16.89	
10	Rob Venier	Canada							16.87	
11	Courtney Ireland	New Zealand							16.74	
12	Mihalis Louka	Cyprus							16.25	
