= Antero Paljakka =

Finnish shot putter (born 1969)

Personal information
- Born: 1 August 1969 (age 57) Sippola, Finland
- Height: 2.01 m (6 ft 7 in)
- Weight: 117 kg (258 lb)–125 kg (276 lb)

Sport
- Sport: Athletics
- Event: Shot put
- Club: Myllykosken Kilpa-Veikot

Antero Paljakka (born 1 August 1969) is a retired Finnish athlete who specialised in the shot put. He represented his country at the 1992 Summer Olympics and 1993 World Championships.

His personal bests in the event are 19.84 metres outdoors (Töysä 1993) and 18.23 metres indoors (Genoa 1992).

== International competitions ==
Year	Competition	Venue	Position	Event	Notes
Representing Finland
1991	Universiade	Sheffield, United Kingdom	7th	Shot put	17.73 m
1992	European Indoor Championships	Genoa, Italy	11th	Shot put	18.23 m
1992	Olympic Games	Barcelona, Spain	20th (q)	Shot put	18.42 m
1993	World Championships	Stuttgart, Germany	14th (q)	Shot put	19.31 m
1994	European Championships	Helsinki, Finland	22nd (q)	Shot put	18.00 m
