= Dirk Urban =

German shot putter

Dirk Urban (born 14 January 1969 in Neumünster, Schleswig-Holstein) is a retired German shot putter. His personal best throw was 20.26 metres, achieved in July 1996 in Iffezheim.

He won the silver medal at the 1996 European Indoor Championships, and competed at the 1996 Olympic Games without reaching the final. He represented the sports club LG Wedel/Pinneberg, and won the silver medal at the German championships in 1996.

== Achievements ==
Year	Competition	Venue	Position	Notes
Representing West Germany
1988	World Junior Championships	Sudbury, Canada	6th	16.91 m
Representing Germany
1996	European Indoor Championships	Stockholm, Sweden	2nd	20.04 m
1996	Olympic Games	Atlanta, United States	13th (q)	19.39 m
