= Austrian Athletics Championships =

Annual outdoor track and field competition

- Sport: Track and field
- Founded: 1911
- Country: Austria

The Austrian Athletics Championships is an annual outdoor track and field competition organised by the Austrian Athletics Federation, which serves as the national championship for the sport in Austria.

The competition was first held in 1911 and women's events were included shortly after in 1918. Separate annual championship events are held for cross country running, road running and racewalking events. There is also an Austrian Indoor Athletics Championships.

== Events ==
The competition programme features a total of 38 individual Austrian Championship athletics events, 19 for men and 19 for women. For each of the sexes, there are seven track running events, three obstacle events, four jumps, four throws, and one combined track and field event.

Track running

- 100 metres, 200 metres, 400 metres, 800 metres, 1500 metres, 5000 metres, 10,000 metres

Obstacle events

- 100 metres hurdles (women only), 110 metres hurdles (men only), 400 metres hurdles, 3000 metres steeplechase

Jumping events

- Pole vault, high jump, long jump, triple jump

Throwing events

- Shot put, discus throw, javelin throw, hammer throw

Combined events

- Decathlon (men only), Heptathlon (women only)

A men's 200 metres hurdles was on the programme from 1961–65 and a men's pentathlon was also formerly contested, being dropped in 1973. The men's 10,000 metres race walk was a previously regular event that stopped after 1980.

The women's programme gradually expanded to match the men's. On the track, the 1500 metres was introduced in 1971, the 3000 metres in 1973, and the 10,000 m in 1985. The 3000 m was replaced by the international standard 5000 m in 1996. The heptathlon was first held in 1981, replacing the long-standing women's pentathlon as the standard combined event. A 400 m hurdles event was introduced in 1976. The women's field events reached parity with the men's after the addition of the triple jump in 1990, the pole vault in 1995 and the hammer throw in 1996. From the period 1990–2004 women competed in racewalking, but this was dropped later. The women's steeplechase was the last event to be added to the schedule, with women first competing in a national championship event in 2001.
