= Markus Koistinen =

Finnish shot putter

Markus Koistinen (born 1 May 1970) is a retired Finnish shot putter.

He finished eleventh at the 1993 World Indoor Championships, tenth at the 1994 European Indoor Championships, fifth at the 1994 European Championships, tenth at the 1995 World Championships, and fifth at the 1996 European Indoor Championships. He also competed at the 1993 World Championships without reaching the final.

His personal best put was 20.50 metres, achieved in June 1996 in Parkano. He was selected to represent Finland at the 1996 Summer Olympics. However, just weeks after achieving his lifetime best, he tested positive for hCG and was banned from the sport.
