= Kent Larsson =

Swedish athlete

Personal information
- Born: 10 June 1963 (age 63) Östersund, Sweden
- Height: 1.80 m (5 ft 11 in)
- Weight: 102 kg (225 lb)

Sport
- Sport: Athletics
- Event: Shot put
- Club: IF Castor; KA2 IF; Spårvägens FK; Trångsvikens IF; Upsala IF

Kent Erik Larsson (born 10 June 1963) is a retired Swedish athlete who specialised in the shot put. He represented his country at the 1992 and 1996 Summer Olympics as well as one indoor and three outdoor World Championships.

Born in Östersund, he discovered athletics through school competitions and started his career in the club IF Castor. He won his first Swedish championship in 1987, and also set his career best at the Swedish championships of 1992 – but also achieved 20,02 in New York in 1994. Larsson trained with a fellow Östersund man, Henrik Wennberg, and the two also represented the club KA2. Larsson also competed for Spårvägens FK and Trångsvikens IF before reuniting with Wennberg in Upsala IF. Larsson resided in Uppsala for 13 years before migrating to Florida.

His personal bests in the event are 20.03 metres outdoors (Kvarnsveden 1993) and 18.42 metres indoors (Genoa 1992).

== Competition record ==
Year	Competition	Venue	Position	Event	Notes
Representing Sweden
1989	Universiade	Duisburg, West Germany	11th	Shot put	17.17 m
1991	World Championships	Tokyo, Japan	6th	Shot put	19.92 m
1992	European Indoor Championships	Genoa, Italy	10th	Shot put	18.42 m
1992	Olympic Games	Barcelona, Spain	18th (q)	Shot put	18.56 m
1993	World Indoor Championships	Toronto, Canada	14th (q)	Shot put	18.05 m
1993	World Championships	Stuttgart, Germany	10th	Shot put	19.12 m
1994	European Championships	Helsinki, Finland	20th (q)	Shot put	18.19 m
1995	World Championships	Gothenburg, Sweden	19th (q)	Shot put	18.73 m
1996	Olympic Games	Atlanta, United States	17th (q)	Shot put	19.05 m
