= 2008 World Junior Championships in Athletics – Men's shot put =

The men's shot put event at the 2008 World Junior Championships in Athletics was held in Bydgoszcz, Poland, at Zawisza Stadium on 8 July. A 6 kg (junior implement) shot was used.

== Medalists ==
Gold	David Storl; Germany
Silver	Alexander Bulanov; Russia
Bronze	Marin Premeru; Croatia

== Results ==
=== Final ===
8 July

Rank	Name	Nationality	Attempts						Result	Notes
Rank	Name	Nationality	1	2	3	4	5	6	Result	Notes
1st place, gold medalist(s)	David Storl	Germany	x	19.81	19.61	x	20.31	21.08	21.08	
2nd place, silver medalist(s)	Alexander Bulanov	Russia	19.29	x	x	19.51	19.31	20.14	20.14	
3rd place, bronze medalist(s)	Marin Premeru	Croatia	19.13	19.73	19.93	19.90	19.64	x	19.93	
4	Przemysław Krawczak	Poland	18.34	19.23	19.21	19.21	18.96	19.85	19.85	
5	Stanislav Seheda	Ukraine	19.80	x	x	19.50	x	x	19.80	
6	Simon Gustafsson	Sweden	19.06	19.11	x	18.82	19.39	x	19.39	
7	Petr Novotný	Czech Republic	17.83	18.62	19.21	x	x	x	19.21	
8	Hendrik Müller	Germany	18.95	19.11	x	18.07	x	x	19.11	
9	Emanuele Fuamatu	Australia	19.11	x	18.31				19.11	
10	Sylwester Zieliński	Poland	18.77	x	x				18.77	
11	Sergey Bakhar	Belarus	18.42	x	18.69				18.69	
12	Miloš Marković	Serbia	18.42	18.11	17.90				18.42	

=== Qualifications ===
8 July

==== Group A ====
Rank	Name	Nationality	Attempts			Result	Notes
Rank	Name	Nationality	1	2	3	Result	Notes
1	Alexander Bulanov	Russia	x	17.97	19.61	19.61	Q
2	Simon Gustafsson	Sweden	18.55	19.27	19.20	19.27	q
3	Przemysław Krawczak	Poland	18.31	19.24	19.21	19.24	q
4	Hendrik Müller	Germany	18.75	x	18.66	18.75	q
5	Sergey Bakhar	Belarus	18.26	18.67	x	18.67	q
6	Petr Novotný	Czech Republic	17.64	18.43	18.60	18.60	q
7	Grigoriy Kamulya	Uzbekistan	17.84	17.72	18.35	18.35	
8	Dmitriy Savytskyy	Ukraine	18.10	18.31	17.69	18.31	
9	Eric Plummer	United States	18.29	17.90	17.75	18.29	
10	Orazio Cremona	South Africa	x	18.28	x	18.28	
11	Arturas Gurklys	Lithuania	x	18.10	17.24	18.10	
12	Jamie Stevenson	United Kingdom	17.69	17.32	17.66	17.69	
13	Henri Pakisjärvi	Finland	x	17.65	17.69	17.69	
14	Mario Cota	Mexico	x	17.68	17.22	17.68	
15	Jasdeep Singh Dhillon	India	16.89	17.57	x	17.57	
16	Alberto Sortino	Italy	16.26	17.05	17.31	17.31	
17	Colin Quirke	Ireland	x	16.11	17.28	17.28	
18	Matías López	Chile	14.80	15.71	15.89	15.89	

==== Group B ====
Rank	Name	Nationality	Attempts			Result	Notes
Rank	Name	Nationality	1	2	3	Result	Notes
1	David Storl	Germany	19.88	-	-	19.88	Q
2	Emanuele Fuamatu	Australia	18.68	19.20	19.28	19.28	q
3	Stanislav Seheda	Ukraine	18.60	18.95	18.83	18.95	q
4	Sylwester Zieliński	Poland	18.70	x	x	18.70	q
5	Marin Premeru	Croatia	17.27	18.57	x	18.57	q
6	Miloš Marković	Serbia	18.56	x	17.73	18.56	q
7	Rosen Karamfilov	Bulgaria	18.37	18.50	x	18.50	
8	Daniel Block	United States	17.28	18.38	x	18.38	
9	Aliaksandr Salabuta	Belarus	18.32	x	x	18.32	
10	Romanas Morozka	Lithuania	17.08	17.49	18.10	18.10	
11	Sergey Dementev	Uzbekistan	17.49	17.46	17.92	17.92	
12	Eder Moreno	Colombia	17.65	17.88	17.54	17.88	
13	Alexander Zinchenko	Austria	17.21	x	x	17.21	
14	José Pinedo	Spain	16.20	16.65	16.17	16.65	
15	Markko Ratas	Estonia	15.26	x	16.54	16.54	
16	Nicolás Martina	Argentina	x	x	16.43	16.43	
17	Patrick Cronie	Netherlands	x	x	15.87	15.87	
	Niko Hauhia	Finland	x	x	x	NM	

== Participation ==
According to an unofficial count, 36 athletes from 28 countries participated in the event.

- Argentina (1)
- Australia (1)
- Austria (1)
- Belarus (2)
- Bulgaria (1)
- Chile (1)
- Colombia (1)
- Croatia (1)
- Czech Republic (1)
- Estonia (1)
- Finland (2)
- Germany (2)
- India (1)
- Ireland (1)
- Italy (1)
- Lithuania (2)
- Mexico (1)
- Netherlands (1)
- Poland (2)
- Russia (1)
- Serbia (1)
- South Africa (1)
- Spain (1)
- Sweden (1)
- Ukraine (2)
- United Kingdom (1)
- United States (2)
- Uzbekistan (2)
