= Sergey Nikolayev (shot putter) =

Russian former track and field athlete (born 1966)

Sergey Nikolayev (Russian: Сергей Николаев; born 12 November 1966) is a Russian former track and field athlete who competed in the shot put. He set a personal best of 21.35 m (70 ft 1/2 in) in 1989. He represented the Soviet Union at the 1991 World Championships in Athletics, placing fifth, and was a two-time participant at the European Athletics Championships, in 1990 and 1994. His highest world seasonal ranking – sixth – came in 1989.

Nikolayev was a silver medallist at the 1992 IAAF World Cup. He was also a bronze medallist on home turf at the 1994 Goodwill Games, taking third behind Americans C. J. Hunter and Randy Barnes.

He was twice national champion at the Russian Athletics Championships, winning the shot put in 1994 and 1998. He competed as a guest at the Japan Championships in Athletics in 1990 and won in a meet record of 19.02 m (62 ft 4 3/4 in).

== International competitions ==
Year	Competition	Venue	Position	Event	Notes
1990	European Championships	Split, Yugoslavia	7th	Shot put	19.97 m
1991	World Championships	Tokyo, Japan	5th	Shot put	19.98 m
1992	IAAF World Cup	Havana, Cuba	2nd	Shot put	20.14 m
1994	European Championships	Helsinki, Finland	—	Shot put	NM
1994	Goodwill Games	Saint Petersburg, Russia	3rd	Shot put	20.11 m

== National titles ==
- Russian Athletics Championships
  - Shot put: 1994, 1998
- Japan Championships in Athletics
  - Shot put: 1990 (guest)
