= Jonny Reinhardt =

German shot putter

Jonny Reinhardt (born 28 June 1968 in Gotha, Thuringia) is a retired German shot putter.

He represented the sports club TV Wattenscheid, and won silver medals at the German championships in 1993 and 1995. His personal best throw was 20.13 metres, achieved in June 1994 in Jena.

== Achievements ==
Year	Competition	Venue	Position	Notes
Representing East Germany
1987	European Junior Championships	Birmingham, England	3rd	18.16 m
Representing Germany
1993	World Championships	Stuttgart, Germany	8th	19.53 m
1994	European Indoor Championships	Paris, France	9th	19.38 m
1994	European Championships	Helsinki, Finland	17th (q)	18.33 m
