= Pétur Guðmundsson (athlete) =

Icelandic shot putter (born 1962)

Pétur Guðmundsson (born 9 March 1962) is a retired shot putter and Highland games competitor from Iceland. He represented Iceland at the 1988 Summer Olympics and 1992 Summer Olympics. He is a police officer by profession.

== Career ==
=== Shot put and discus ===
Pétur's personal best shot put of 21.26 metres (69 ft 9 in), thrown on 10 November 1990 in Mosfellsbær ranked him the number 3 shot putter in the world during that year. His competition best is 20.04 metres (65 ft 9 in) achieved at 1994 European Athletics Indoor Championships in Paris, France where he won bronze. Pétur won five gold medals at Games of the Small States of Europe for shot put in 1985, 1987, 1991, 1993 and 1997; and a gold and bronze in discus throw in 1997 and 1993 respectively.

=== Highland games ===
Pétur is also the current world record holder in the Braemar Stone throw at two different weights: 30 lb (13.6 kg) for 11.65 metres (38 ft 3 in) (Estes Park, Colorado, 2000) and 28 lb (12.7 kg) for 12.47 metres (40 ft 11 in) (Fredericksburg, Virginia, 2000). He also held the 22 lb (10.0 kg) world record for 28 years from 1997 to 2025 with a performance of 15.38 metres (50 ft 6 in). Pétur is widely regarded as one of the greatest stone throwers in history.

=== Strongman ===
Having competed in Strongman at national level, Pétur won third place twice in Iceland’s Strongest Man in 1992 and 1994. He is one of only a few men who has lifted the legendary Brynjólfstak which weighs 281.5 kg (621 lb). Petursstein, another iconic Icelandic Lifting stone located in front of the Dynjandi waterfall in the Westfjords, is named after him.

== Competition record ==
Year	Competition	Venue	Position	Event	Notes
Representing Iceland
1985	Games of the Small States of Europe	Serravalle, San Marino	1st	Shot put	16.01 m
1987	Games of the Small States of Europe	Monaco	1st	Shot put	18.53 m
1988	Olympic Games	Seoul, South Korea	14th (q)	Shot put	19.21 m
1989	European Indoor Championships	The Hague, Netherlands	12th	Shot put	17.17 m
1989	World Indoor Championships	Budapest, Hungary	11th	Shot put	18.31 m
1990	European Indoor Championships	Glasgow, United Kingdom	14th	Shot put	18.59 m
1990	European Championships	Split, Yugoslavia	11th	Shot put	19.46 m
1991	World Indoor Championships	Seville, Spain	4th	Shot put	19.81 m
1991	Games of the Small States of Europe	Andorra la Vella, Andorra	1st	Shot put	18.61 m
1991	Games of the Small States of Europe	Andorra la Vella, Andorra	3rd	Discus throw	48.92 m
1991	World Championships	Tokyo, Japan	15th (q)	Shot put	18.51 m
1992	European Indoor Championships	Genoa, Italy	5th	Shot put	19.53 m
1992	Olympic Games	Barcelona, Spain	14th (q)	Shot put	19.15 m
1993	Games of the Small States of Europe	Malta	1st	Shot put	19.60 m
1993	World Championships	Stuttgart, Germany	28th (q)	Shot put	18.11 m
1994	European Indoor Championships	Paris, France	3rd	Shot put	20.04 m
1994	European Championships	Helsinki, Finland	7th	Shot put	19.34 m
1995	World Indoor Championships	Barcelona, Spain	6th	Shot put	19.67 m
1997	Games of the Small States of Europe	Reykjavík, Iceland	1st	Shot put	19.12 m
1997	Games of the Small States of Europe	Reykjavík, Iceland	1st	Discus throw	55.34 m
1998	European Championships	Budapest, Hungary	23rd (q)	Shot put	17.89 m
