= Han Min-soo =

South Korean shot putter

Personal information
- Nationality: South Korean
- Born: 24 March 1963 (age 63)

Sport
- Sport: Athletics
- Event: Shot put

Han Min-soo (Korean: 한민수; RR: Han Minsu, born 24 March 1963) is a South Korean athlete. He competed in the men's shot put at the 1988 Summer Olympics.

Two weeks before the 14th South Korean Athletics Championships, Han broke the South Korean record in the shot put by throwing 16.11 m to best the previous mark of 15.53 m. At the national championships, he broke his own record with a 16.29 m throw.
