= 1982 European Athletics Indoor Championships – Men's shot put =

The men's shot put event at the 1982 European Athletics Indoor Championships was held on 7 March.

== Results ==
Rank	Name	Nationality	Results	Notes
1st place, gold medalist(s)	Vladimir Milić	Yugoslavia	20.45	
2nd place, silver medalist(s)	Remigius Machura	Czechoslovakia	20.07	
3rd place, bronze medalist(s)	Jovan Lazarević	Yugoslavia	19.65	
4	Vladimir Kiselyov	Soviet Union	19.55	
5	Alessandro Andrei	Italy	19.49	
6	Marco Montelatici	Italy	18.99	
7	Udo Gelhausen	West Germany	18.92	
8	Yves Brouzet	France	18.54	
9	Luigi Sintoni	Italy	18.47	
10	Luc Viudès	France	18.43	
11	Edward Sarul	Poland	18.36	
12	Erwin Weitzl	Austria	18.32	
13	István Kácsor	Hungary	17.91	
14	Simon Rodhouse	Great Britain	17.87	
