= 1986 World Junior Championships in Athletics – Men's shot put =

The men's shot put event at the 1986 World Junior Championships in Athletics was held in Athens, Greece, at Olympic Stadium on 18 and 19 July. A 7257g (senior implement) shot was used.

== Medalists ==
Gold	Aleksey Lukashenko; Soviet Union
Silver	Vyacheslav Lykho; Soviet Union
Bronze	Radoslav Despotov; Bulgaria

== Results ==
=== Final ===
19 July

Rank	Name	Nationality	Result	Notes
1st place, gold medalist(s)	Aleksey Lukashenko	Soviet Union	18.90	
2nd place, silver medalist(s)	Vyacheslav Lykho	Soviet Union	18.71	
3rd place, bronze medalist(s)	Radoslav Despotov	Bulgaria	18.17	
4	Jeno Kóczián	Hungary	17.64	
5	John Minns	Australia	17.27	
6	Adewale Olukoju	Nigeria	17.19	
7	Tino Bonk	East Germany	16.90	
8	Jean-Philippe Revallier	France	16.84	
9	Bentley Laidler	Australia	16.44	
10	Darren Crawford	United States	16.14	
11	Tony Sylvester	United States	16.09	
12	Simon Williams	United Kingdom	15.87	

=== Qualifications ===
18 Jul

==== Group A ====
Rank	Name	Nationality	Result	Notes
1	Radoslav Despotov	Bulgaria	17.90	Q
2	Vyacheslav Lykho	Soviet Union	16.93	Q
3	Jeno Kóczián	Hungary	16.51	Q
4	Simon Williams	United Kingdom	16.38	Q
5	Tino Bonk	East Germany	16.18	Q
6	Tony Sylvester	United States	16.16	Q
7	Bentley Laidler	Australia	16.15	Q
8	Khalid Al-Khalidi	Saudi Arabia	14.90	
9	Bojan Paunovic	Canada	13.81	
10	Troy Patterson	Barbados	13.40	
11	James Wong Tuck Yim	Singapore	11.35	

==== Group B ====
Rank	Name	Nationality	Result	Notes
1	Aleksey Lukashenko	Soviet Union	17.01	Q
2	John Minns	Australia	16.92	Q
3	Adewale Olukoju	Nigeria	16.25	Q
4	Jean-Philippe Revallier	France	16.00	Q
5	Darren Crawford	United States	15.52	q
6	Delore Lakusta	Canada	15.11	
7	Mahmoud Mustapha Jalal	Kuwait	14.48	
8	Ramón Jiménez Gaona	Paraguay	13.71	
9	Jaime Comandari	El Salvador	12.78	

== Participation ==
According to an unofficial count, 20 athletes from 16 countries participated in the event.

- Australia (2)
- Barbados (1)
- Bulgaria (1)
- Canada (2)
- East Germany (1)
- El Salvador (1)
- France (1)
- Hungary (1)
- Kuwait (1)
- Nigeria (1)
- Paraguay (1)
- Saudi Arabia (1)
- Singapore (1)
- Soviet Union (2)
- United Kingdom (1)
- United States (2)
