= Colin Quirke =

Irish discus thrower

Colin Quirke (Ó Cuirc)
Personal information
- Nationality: Irish
- Born: June 17, 1990 (age 36)
- Height: 6 ft 4 in (1.93 m)
- Weight: 265 lb (120 kg)
- Parent: Paul Quirke

Sport
- Sport: Track and field
- Event: Discus
- College team: Oklahoma Sooners, Manhattan Jaspers '13
- Club: Athletics Ireland
- Turned pro: 2012

Achievements and titles
- Personal bests: Shot put: 19.36 m (63 ft 6 in); Discus: 62.18 m (204 ft 0 in)
Medal record
Men's athletics
Representing Ireland
2020 National Championships
Gold medal – first place	2020 Dublin	Discus throw
2019 National Championships
Gold medal – first place	2019 Dublin	Discus throw
2019 Leiria International Games
Bronze medal – third place	2019 Leiria, Portugal	Discus throw
IAAF Gothenburg Grand Prix
	2019 Gothenburg, Sweden	Discus
2017 National Championships
Gold medal – first place	2017 Dublin	Discus throw
2015 National Championships
Gold medal – first place	2015 Dublin	Discus throw
2014 National Championships
Silver medal – second place	2014 Dublin	Shot Put
2014 National Championships
Gold medal – first place	2014 Dublin	Discus throw
European U23 Championships
	2011 Ostrava, Czech Republic	Discus throw
2009 National Championships
Gold medal – first place	2009 Dublin	Shot Put
2009 National Championships
Gold medal – first place	2009 Dublin	Discus throw
European Junior Championships
	2009 Novi Sad, Serbia	Shot Put, Discus
World Junior Championships
	2008 Bydgoszcz, Poland	Shot Put, Discus
World Youth Championships
	2007 Ostrava, Czech Republic	Shot Put, Discus

Colin Quirke (born 17 June 1990) is an Irish-American Discus thrower from Los Gatos, California.

== Major Competition ==
Colin Quirke represented Ireland at World Youth Championships in Athletics and the World Junior Championships in Athletics, making the finals in the shot put and setting a national junior record (63’5). He holds the Irish national junior record in the discus throw and shot put.

== NCAA ==
From 2008 to 2010, Colin Quirke represented University of Oklahoma and from 2010 to 2012, Colin Quirke represented Manhattan College '12 as an NCAA Division I thrower. Colin received NCAA Division 1 All-American honors in the Discus Throw. He was named the MAAC Conference Most-Outstanding Performer in both 2011 and 2012 setting a Championship record in the Discus Throw.

== Prep ==
Colin finished 2nd at Los Gatos High School in California Interscholastic Federation where he was runner-up at 2008 CIF California State Meet and third at 2007 CIF California State Meet both in Shot put.

== Personal life ==
Colin Quirke's father is Paul Quirke, a former Irish Shot Put national record holder.
