= Jim Doehring =

American shot putter (born 1962)

Personal information
- Full name: James F. Doehring
- Born: January 27, 1962 (age 64) Santa Barbara, California, U.S.
Medal record
Men's Athletics
Representing United States
Olympic Games
Silver medal – second place	1992 Barcelona	Shot Put
IAAF World Indoor Championships
Silver medal – second place	1993 Toronto	Shot Put

James F. Doehring (born January 27, 1962, in Santa Barbara, California) is a former American athlete who primarily competed in the shot put.

In 1981, Doehring was the United States junior champion in shot put before being severely injured in a motorcycle accident.

He recovered and was an All-American thrower for the San Jose State Spartans track and field team, finishing runner-up in the shot put at the 1985 NCAA Division I Indoor Track and Field Championships.

Doehring earned a berth on the 1988 Summer Olympics team, finishing in eleventh place. In December 1990 Doehring tested positive for steroids and was given a two year suspension. He was reinstated in March 1992 due to "procedural improprieties" in the test. This allowed Doehring to compete for the United States in the 1992 Summer Olympics in Barcelona, Spain where he won the silver medal in the men's shot put. The U.S. finished first and second in the event for the first time since the 1968 Summer Olympics in Mexico City. At the 1993 IAAF World Indoor Championships, he again won the silver medal in the men's shot put.
