= Aleksandr Bulanov =

Russian shot putter (born 1989)

Aleksandr Bulanov (born 26 December 1989) is a Russian athlete specialising in the shot put. He won the bronze medal at the 2015 Summer Universiade. Earlier in his career he won the silver at the 2008 World Junior Championships and gold at the 2007 European Junior Championships.

His personal bests in the event are 19.99 metres outdoors (Yerino 2015) and 19.92 metres indoors (Gothenburg 2013).

== Doping ban ==
Bulanov tested positive for the anabolic steroid methandienone in an out-of-competition control in July 2009 and was subsequently handed a two-year ban from sports. The ban ended on 20 July 2011.

== Competition record ==
Year	Competition	Venue	Position	Event	Notes
Representing Russia
2007	European Junior Championships	Hengelo, Netherlands	1st	Shot put (6 kg)	19.95
2008	World Junior Championships	Bydgoszcz, Poland	2nd	Shot put (6 kg)	20.14 m
2013	European Indoor Championships	Gothenburg, Sweden	6th	Shot put	19.70 m
2015	Universiade	Gwangju, South Korea	3rd	Shot put	19.84 m
