= Giorgio Venturi =

Italian shot putter

Personal information
- Nationality: Italian
- Born: 23 June 1966 (age 60) Salerno
- Height: 1.87 m (6 ft 2 in)
- Weight: 102 kg (225 lb)

Sport
- Country: Italy
- Sport: Athletics
- Event: Shot put
- Club: G.S. Fiamme Azzurre

Achievements and titles
- Personal best: Shot put: 19.67 m (1996)

Giorgio Venturi (born 23 June 1966) is a former Italian shot putter who competed at the 1996 Summer Olympics.

== Biography ==
He participated at the competition which was one of the best team results of the Italian national athletics team in the shot put events at the International competitions. This happened at the 1996 European Athletics Indoor Championships held in Stockholm, when three athletes participated in the competition, one won the race (Dal Soglio) and one ranked fourth (Fantini). Venturi was 14th but could not reach the final for only 15 centimeters.

== National titles ==
- Italian Athletics Indoor Championships
  - Shot put: 1989
