= Paul Quirke =

Irish athlete

Paul Quirke (Ó Cuirc)
Personal information
- Nationality: Irish
- Born: 5 August 1963 (age 62)
- Height: 193 cm (6 ft 4 in)
- Weight: 107 kg (236 lb)
- Children: Colin Quirke

Sport
- Sport: Athletics
- Event: Shot put
- Club: Crusaders Athletic Club, Dublin

Paul Quirke (born 5 August 1963) is an Irish athlete. He competed in the men's shot put at the 1992 Summer Olympics.

Quirke finished third behind Mike Winch in the shot put event at the British 1984 AAA Championships.
