= Vladimir Vićentijević =

Serbian shot putter (born 1974)

Vladimir Vićentijević (born 13 July 1974) is a retired Serbian shot putter who represented Yugoslavia.

== Biography ==
He finished fourteenth at the 1992 World Junior Championships and competed at the 1996 European Indoor Championships without reaching the final. He became Yugoslav shot put champion in 1995, breaking a long winning streak for Dragan Perić.
