= Vyacheslav Lykho =

Russian athlete

Vyacheslav Nikolayevich Lykho (Russian: Вячеслав Николаевич Лыхо; born 16 January 1967, Mikhnevo, Moscow Oblast) is a retired Russian shot putter who represented the USSR, the Unified Team, and later Russia. He won the bronze medal at the 1992 Olympic Games in Barcelona, Spain. He was stripped of his bronze medal won at the 1990 European Championships in Split due to a doping offence.

== International competitions ==
Year	Competition	Venue	Position	Event	Notes
Representing the Soviet Union
1986	World Junior Championships	Athens, Greece	2nd	Shot put	18.71 m
1987	World Championships	Rome, Italy	9th	Shot put	19.98 m
1990	Goodwill Games	Seattle, United States	3rd	Shot put	20.70 m
1990	European Championships	Split, Yugoslavia	—	Shot put	DQ
Representing the Unified Team
1992	Olympic Games	Barcelona, Spain	3rd	Shot put	20.94 m
Representing Russia
1996	European Indoor Championships	Stockholm, Sweden	10th	Shot put	18.80 m
1997	World Championships	Athens, Greece	27th (q)	Shot put	18.04 m

== National titles ==
- Russian Athletics Championships
  - Shot put: 1992, 1997

== See also ==
- List of doping cases in athletics
- List of Olympic medalists in athletics (men)
- List of 1992 Summer Olympics medal winners
- Shot put at the Olympics
