= Karel Šula =

Slovak shot putter

Personal information
- Born: 30 June 1959 (age 67)

Sport
- Sport: Track and field

Karel Šula (born 30 June 1959) is a retired Slovak shot putter.

He finished thirteenth at the 1984 European Indoor Championships, fifth at the 1988 European Indoor Championships and the 1989 European Indoor Championships, ninth at the 1989 World Indoor Championships, twelfth at the 1990 European Indoor Championships, and competed at the 1991 World Championships without reaching the final.

His personal best throw was 20.71 metres, achieved in June 1988 in Prague. Indoors he had 20.94 metres, achieved in January 1989 in Bratislava.

His son is also an athletics competitor specialized in shot put.
