= Marek Bílek =

Czech discus thrower

- Born: 7 January 1973 (age 53); Prague, Czechoslovakia
- Occupation: discus thrower
- Relatives: Martin Bílek (twin brother)

Marek Bílek (born 7 January 1973) is a Czech retired discus thrower.

He was born in Prague and represented the club Dukla Prague. He won the bronze medal at the 1992 World Junior Championships and competed at the 1996 Olympic Games without reaching the final. He became Czech champion in 1995.

His personal best throw was 62.40 metres, achieved in 1996.

He is the twin brother of Martin Bílek.
