= Andriy Nemchaninov =

Russian athlete

Personal information
- Nationality: Russian
- Born: 27 November 1966 (age 59)

Sport
- Sport: Athletics
- Event: Shot put

Andriy Nemchaninov (born 27 November 1966) is a Russian athlete. He competed in the men's shot put at the 1992 Summer Olympics.
