= Vítězslav Jankových =

Czech ice hockey forward

- Born: March 31, 1972 (age 52); Uherské Hradiště, Czechoslovakia
- Height: 6 ft 1 in (185 cm)
- Weight: 176 lb (80 kg; 12 st 8 lb)
- Position: Forward
- Shot: Right
- Played for: TJ Zlín; HC Bílí Tygři Liberec; HC Kladno; SG Pontebba
- Playing career: 1989–2017

Vítězslav Jankových (born March 31, 1972) is a Czech former professional ice hockey forward.

Jankových played two games in the Czechoslovak First Ice Hockey League for TJ Zlín during the 1989–90 season and 79 games in the Czech Extraliga for HC Bílí Tygři Liberec and HC Kladno between 2002 and 2004. He also played in the Serie A for SG Pontebba during the 2006–07 season.
