= Jenő Kóczián =

Hungarian shot putter

Personal information
- Nationality: Hungarian
- Born: 5 April 1967 (age 59)

Sport
- Sport: Athletics
- Event: Shot put

Jenő Kóczián (born 5 April 1967) is a Hungarian athlete. He competed in the men's shot put at the 1996 Summer Olympics.
