= Remigius Machura =

Czech shot putter

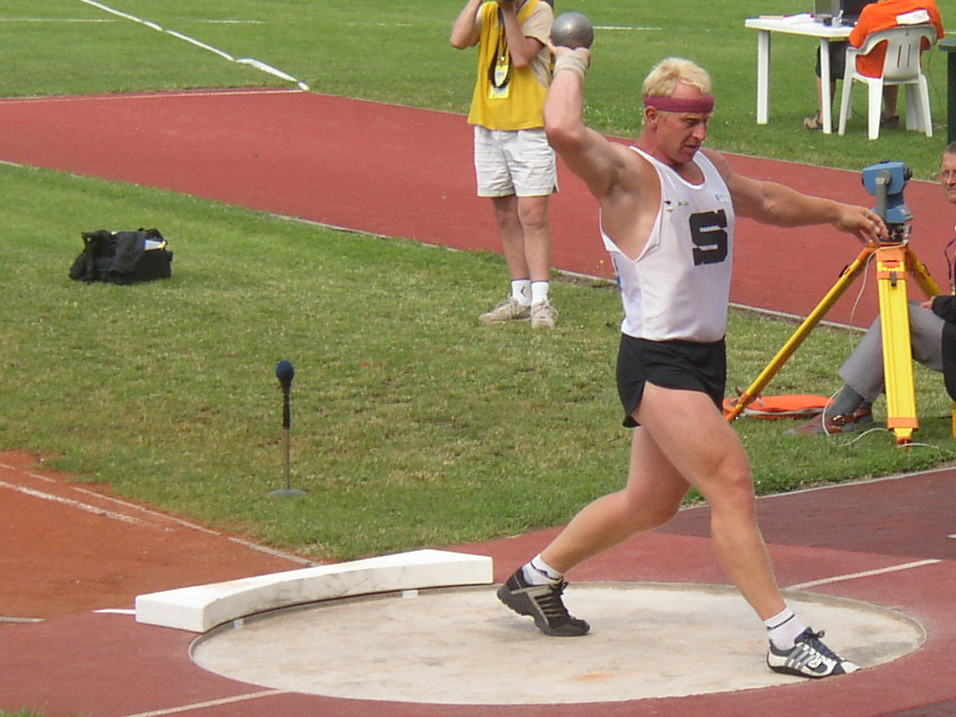
- Remigius Machura in 2005

Personal information
- Born: 3 July 1960 (age 66) Rychnov nad Kněžnou, Czechoslovakia
Medal record
Men's athletics
Representing Czechoslovakia
World Championships
Bronze medal – third place	1983 Helsinki	Shot put
World Indoor Championships
Gold medal – first place	1985 Paris	Shot put
European Championships
Bronze medal – third place	1982 Athens	Shot put
European Indoor Championships
Gold medal – first place	1985 Athens	Shot put
Gold medal – first place	1988 Budapest	Shot put
Silver medal – second place	1982 Milan	Shot put
Summer Universiade
Gold medal – first place	1985 Kobe	Shot put

Remigius Machura (Czech pronunciation: [ˈremɪɡɪjus ˈmaxura]; born 3 July 1960) is a Czech retired shot putter who represented Czechoslovakia. His career highlights include a bronze medal at the first World Championships and a gold medal at the first World Indoor Championships. He also represented his country at the 1988 Summer Olympics where he finished fifth. His personal best put of 21.93 metres puts him 20th in the all-time performers list and he remains the Czech record holder in the event indoors and outdoors.

He was banned from the sport for life in 1985 for using Stanozolol, but this ruling was overturned just two years later. After retirement, Machura openly admitted to using banned substances throughout his career. In 2000, an investigation headed by Dr. Jan Hnízdil revealed a secret state-sponsored doping programme in 1980s Czechoslovakia. Elite athletes were forced into doping, known as the "Program of Specialized Care", and Machura acknowledged that he had been a participant and claimed a number of other prominent Czechoslovak athletes were also involved.

Machura has a son, Remigius Machura Jr., who is a shot putter as well. In September 2010 he got 2-year doping ban.

== International competitions ==
Year	Competition	Venue	Position	Notes
Representing Czechoslovakia
1982	European Indoor Championships	Milan, Italy	2nd	20.07 m
1982	European Championships	Athens, Greece	3rd	20.59 m
1983	World Championships	Helsinki, Finland	3rd	20.98 m
1985	World Indoor Championships	Paris, France	1st	21.22 m
1985	European Indoor Championships	Athens, Greece	1st	21.74 m
1987	World Championships	Rome, Italy	4th	21.39 m
1988	European Indoor Championships	Budapest, Hungary	1st	21.42 m
1988	Summer Olympics	Seoul, South Korea	5th	20.57 m

== See also ==
- List of doping cases in athletics
