= Vítězslav Bílek =

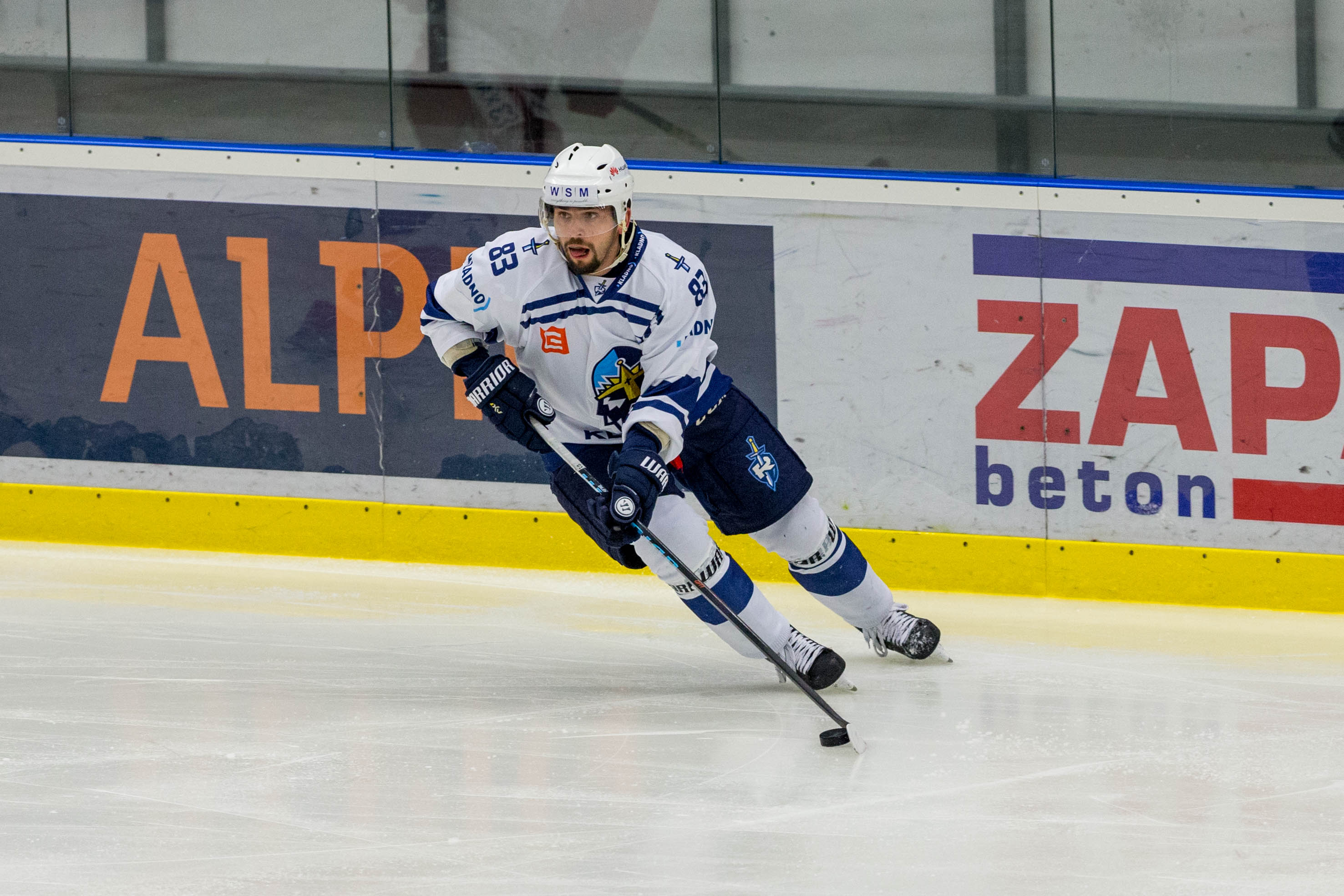
- Born: July 31, 1983 (age 42) Tábor, Czechoslovakia
- Height: 5 ft 11 in (180 cm)
- Weight: 190 lb (86 kg; 13 st 8 lb)
- Position: Forward
- Shoots: Left
- Czech 2.liga team Former teams: HK Kralupy nad Vltavou; Rytíři Kladno; Oulun Kärpät; HC Energie Karlovy Vary; Mountfield HK; Beibarys Atyrau; HC Sparta Praha; HC Stadion Litoměřice; MHC Martin; Starbulls Rosenheim; HC Řisuty
- Playing career: 2002–present

Vítězslav Bílek (born July 31, 1983) is a Czech professional ice hockey forward who plays for HK Kralupy nad Vltavou of the Czech 2.liga. He played with Rytíři Kladno in the Czech Extraliga during the 2010–11 Czech Extraliga season.

== Career statistics ==
			Regular season					Playoffs
Season	Team	League	GP	G	A	Pts	PIM	GP	G	A	Pts	PIM
1999–00	HC Kladno U18	Czech U18	46	42	23	65	42	4	2	2	4	4
2000–01	HC Kladno U20	Czech U20	46	19	11	30	12	—	—	—	—	—
2001–02	HC Kladno U20	Czech U20	29	15	18	33	24	8	3	2	5	2
2001–02	HC Kladno	Czech	2	0	0	0	0	—	—	—	—	—
2001–02	HC Slovan Ústí nad Labem	Czech2	2	1	2	3	0	6	0	0	0	2
2002–03	HC Kladno U20	Czech U20	13	8	6	14	10	2	0	1	1	2
2002–03	HC Kladno	Czech	29	6	6	12	16	10	0	3	3	4
2003–04	HC Kladno U20	Czech U20	1	0	0	0	0	2	2	1	3	4
2003–04	HC Kladno	Czech	51	7	10	17	16	—	—	—	—	—
2003–04	HK Slany	Czech3	7	11	9	20	4	4	7	6	13	4
2004–05	HC Kladno	Czech	47	9	12	21	28	7	1	4	5	2
2005–06	HC Kladno	Czech	45	12	12	24	10	—	—	—	—	—
2005–06	Kärpät	SM-liiga	13	6	4	10	2	5	0	0	0	0
2006–07	HC Kladno	Czech	52	18	9	27	32	3	0	0	0	4
2007–08	HC Karlovy Vary	Czech	36	8	7	15	26	17	2	1	3	10
2008–09	HC Karlovy Vary	Czech	15	3	4	7	6	—	—	—	—	—
2008–09	HC Ceske Budejovice	Czech	23	3	2	5	8	12	1	1	2	2
2009–10	HC Kladno	Czech	51	5	15	20	26	12	5	2	7	14
2010–11	HC Kladno	Czech	32	5	5	10	12	11	2	8	10	2
2011–12	HC Kladno	Czech	36	3	2	5	24	2	0	0	0	0
2011–12	SK Kadan	Czech2	4	1	1	2	8	—	—	—	—	—
2012–13	Beibarys Atyrau	Kazakhstan	37	10	8	18	24	14	3	9	12	8
2013–14	Beibarys Atyrau	Kazakhstan	19	7	9	16	6	—	—	—	—	—
2013–14	HC Kladno	Czech	14	0	1	1	10	6	1	2	3	0
2014–15	HC Litomerice	Czech2	52	34	20	54	48	3	0	0	0	2
2014–15	HC Sparta Praha	Czech	1	0	0	0	2	—	—	—	—	—
2014–15	MHC Martin	Slovak	4	4	2	6	0	5	2	0	2	4
2015–16	HC Kladno	Czech2	51	45	25	70	36	6	0	2	2	2
2016–17	MHC Martin	Slovak	10	9	4	13	4	—	—	—	—	—
2017–18	HC Litomerice	Czech2	39	14	15	29	22	—	—	—	—	—
2017–18	Starbulls Rosenheim	Germany3	11	9	10	19	6	8	6	4	10	2
Czech totals			405	73	79	152	200	70	12	18	30	34
