= Kalman Konya =

Hungarian-West German shot putter

Personal information
- Born: 27 October 1961 (age 64) Zurich, Switzerland

Sport
- Sport: Track and field
Medal record
Representing West Germany
Summer Universiade
Bronze medal – third place	1989 Duisburg	Shot put

Kalman Konya (Hungarian: Kónya Kálmán, born 27 October 1961 in Zürich) is a retired Hungarian-West German shot putter.

He won the bronze medal at the 1989 Summer Universiade and finished ninth at the 1990 European Championships. He was qualified for the 1992 Olympic Games, but did not make an actual appearance. Konya represented the sports club Salamander Kornwestheim, and became German champion in 1990.

His personal best throw was 20.55 metres, achieved in July 1993 in Rüdlingen.
