= Martin Bílek =

Czech shot putter

- Born: 7 January 1973; Prague, Czechoslovakia
- Died: 1 August 2000 (aged 27); Prague, Czech Republic
- Occupation: shot putter
- Relatives: Marek Bílek (twin brother)

Martin Bílek (7 January 1973 – 1 August 2000) was a Czech shot putter.

He finished eighth at the 1992 World Junior Championships. He competed at the 1994 and 1996 European Indoor Championships without reaching the final. He became Czech indoor champion in 1995. After failing to reach the 1997 World Championships he retired.

He committed suicide in 2000. He was the twin brother of Marek Bílek.
