= Ron Backes =

American shot putter

Personal information
- Born: February 18, 1963 (age 63) St. Cloud, Minnesota, United States

Sport
- Sport: Track and field
Medal record
Representing United States
World Indoor Championships
Bronze medal – third place	1991 Seville	Shot put
Summer Universiade
Bronze medal – third place	1987 Zagreb	Shot put

Ronald Lee "Ron" Backes (born February 18, 1963) is an American retired shot putter.

His personal best throw was 21.02 metres, achieved in May 1988 in San Jose.

Competing for the Minnesota Golden Gophers track and field team, Backes won the 1986 shot put at the NCAA Division I Indoor Track and Field Championships with a throw of 21.01 meters.

== Achievements ==
Year	Competition	Venue	Position	Notes
Representing the United States
1987	World Indoor Championships	Indianapolis, United States	6th	
1991	World Indoor Championships	Seville, Spain	3rd	
1991	World Championships	Tokyo, Japan	8th	
1992	Olympic Games	Barcelona, Spain	10th	
