= Georg Andersen (athlete) =

Norwegian shot putter (born 1963)

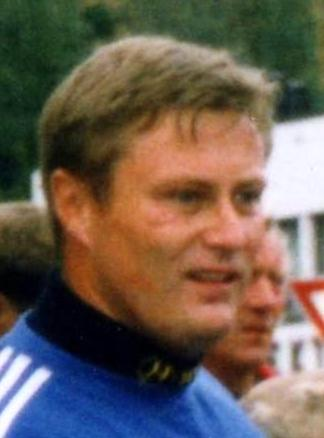
- Andersen in 1995

Medal record

Men's athletics

Representing Norway

World Championships
Disqualified	1991 Tokyo	Shot put

European Championships
Bronze medal – third place	1990 Split	Shot put

Georg Arnfinn Andersen (born 7 January 1963) is a Norwegian shot putter. He represented IK Grane, IK Tjalve and Urædd Friidrett.

Early in his international career he finished twelfth at the 1985 European Indoor Championships, tenth at the 1986 European Championships, sixth at the 1988 European Indoor Championships and tenth at the 1988 Summer Olympics. He then got his international breakthrough as he won bronze medals at the 1988 IAAF Grand Prix Final, 1989 World Indoor Championships, 1989 European Indoor Championships and 1990 European Championships and a silver at the 1990 IAAF Grand Prix Final.

In 1991 he originally won the silver medal at the World Championships in Tokyo with a throw of 20.81 metres, but as he was found using anabolic steroids he was retroactively disqualified. He returned from the doping suspension to compete at the 1995 World Championships, but failed to qualify for the final round there. He became Norwegian champion in 1987, 1988, 1990 and 1995.

His personal best throw was 20.86 metres, achieved in August 1990 in Malmö. This ranks him second among Norwegian shot putters, only behind Lars Arvid Nilsen.

Georg Andersen is working as a police officer. His son Stian Andersen competed at the 2005 World Youth Championships in octathlon.
