= Sören Tallhem =

Swedish shot putter

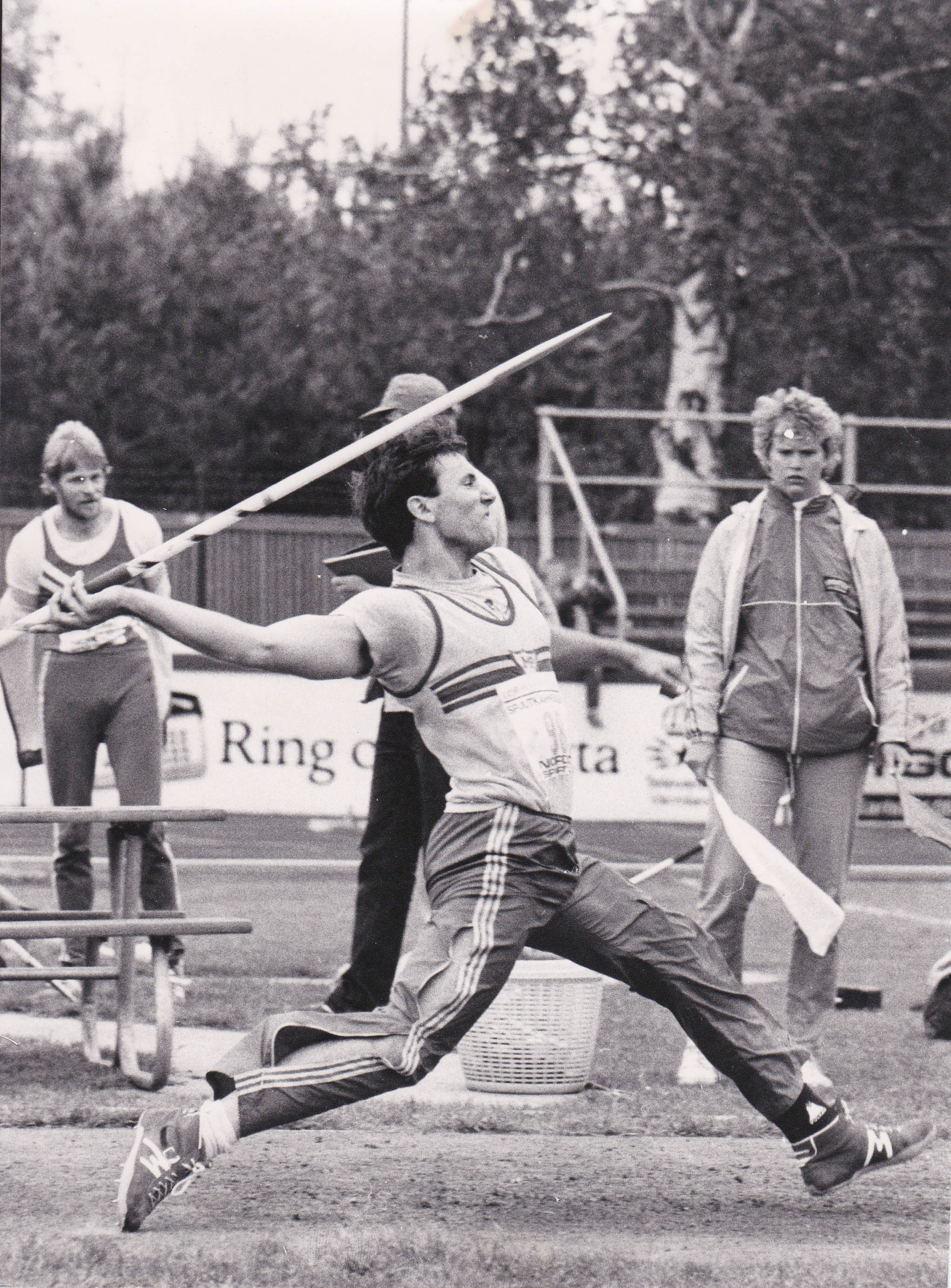
- Soren Tallhem throwing the javelin in 1983.

Personal information
- Nationality: Swedish
- Born: 16 February 1964 (age 61)

Sport
- Sport: Athletics
- Event: Shot put

Sören Tallhem (born 16 February 1964) is a Swedish athlete. He competed in the men's shot put at the 1984 Summer Olympics and the 1992 Summer Olympics.

Competing for the BYU Cougars track and field team, Tallhem won the 1985 shot put at the NCAA Division I Indoor Track and Field Championships with a throw of 21.25 metres.

In Sweden, Tallhem represented UoIF Matteuspojkarna, Södertörns FF, and Spårvägens FK.
