= Dimitrios Koutsoukis =

Greek shot putter

Dimitrios Koutsoukis (Greek: Δημήτριος Κουτσούκης; born 8 December 1962) is a retired Greek shot putter who won a gold medal in the 1987 Mediterranean Games in Shot Put and represented Greece in 1984 Summer Olympic Games.

Koutsoukis competed for the Washington State Cougars track and field team in the NCAA.

His personal best throw was 20.74 metres, achieved in July 1989 in Drama. This is the current Greek record.

== Achievements ==
Year	Competition	Venue	Position	Event	Notes
Representing Greece
1987	World Indoor Championships	Indianapolis, United States	11th	Shot put	
1987	Mediterranean Games	Latakia, Syria	1st	Shot put	
1988	European Indoor Championships	Budapest, Hungary	8th	Shot put	
1989	European Indoor Championships	The Hague, Netherlands	9th	Shot put	
1990	European Indoor Championships	Glasgow, Scotland	7th	Shot put	
1993	Mediterranean Games	Narbonne, France	3rd	Shot put	
