= Lars Arvid Nilsen =

Norwegian shot putter (born 1965)

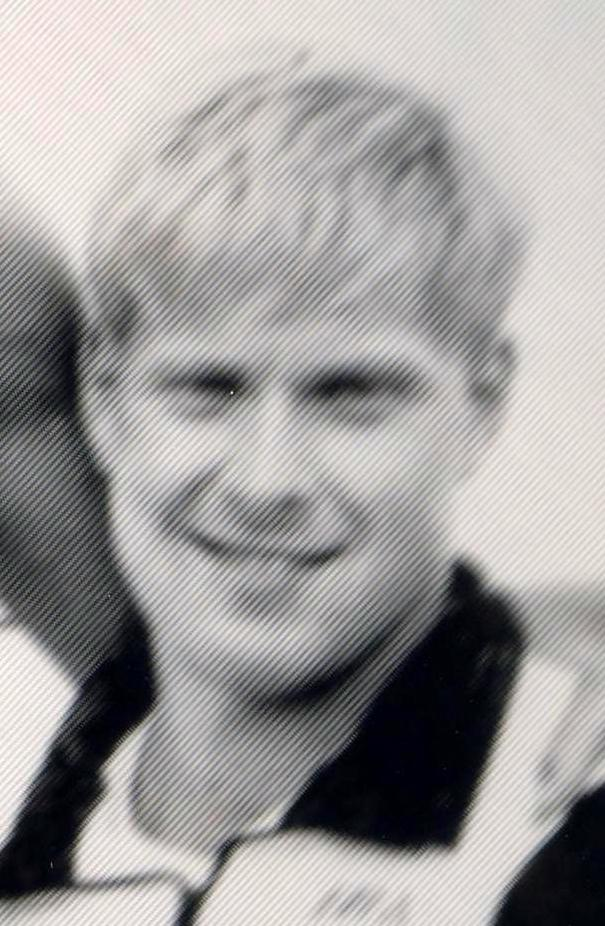

Personal information
- Born: 15 April 1965 (age 61) Notodden, Norway

Sport
- Sport: Track and field
Medal record
Representing Norway
World Championships
Silver medal – second place	1991 Tokyo	Shot put
Summer Universiade
Gold medal – first place	1989 Duisburg	Shot put

Lars Arvid Nilsen (born 15 April 1965) is a retired Norwegian shot putter. He represented Urædd Friidrett.

He finished fifth at the 1986 European Championships, fifth at the 1987 World Indoor Championships, tenth at the 1990 European Indoor Championships, sixth at the 1990 European Championships and fifth at the 1991 World Indoor Championships. He became Norwegian champion in 1989 and 1991. Later in 1991 he won the bronze medal at the World Championships in Tokyo with a throw of 20.75 metres, but as the silver medalist, Nilsen's countryman Georg Andersen was later disqualified from the competition because of using a banned substance, Nilsen was promoted to silver medal position. Nilsen's last international competition was the 1992 European Indoor Championships, where he finished seventh.

Nilsen was a two-time NCAA Division I champion in the shot put for the SMU Mustangs track and field team. His personal best throw was 21.22 metres, achieved in June 1986 in Indianapolis. This is the current Norwegian record.

Nilsen was tested for and found to be using banned substances in 1987 and 1992, which led to a lifetime ban from organized sports. In 2004 he was pardoned and is free to participate in organized sports and competitions in any other sports than shot put. He may not participate in competitions which qualify for national or international championships.
