= Aleksandr Klimenko (shot putter) =

Ukrainian shot putter (1970–2000)

Personal information
- Born: 27 March 1970 Kiev, Soviet Union
- Died: 7 March 2000 (aged 29) Kiev, Ukraine

Sport
- Sport: Track and field
Medal record
Representing Soviet Union
World Championships
Bronze medal – third place	1991 Tokyo	Shot put
Summer Universiade
Gold medal – first place	1991 Sheffield	Shot put
Representing Ukraine
European Championships
Gold medal – first place	1994 Helsinki	Shot put
European Indoor Championships
Silver medal – second place	1992 Genoa	Shot put
Summer Universiade
Gold medal – first place	1993 Buffalo	Shot put

Aleksandr "Andriy" Klimenko (Ukrainian: Олександр Клименко Oleksandr Klymenko, Russian: Александр Клименко; 27 March 1970 – 7 March 2000) was a Ukrainian shot putter.

== Biography ==
Born in Kiev he is best known for his gold medal at the 1994 European Championships in Helsinki, which he achieved with a lifetime best throw of 20.78 meters.

Klimenko died in a shooting on 7 March 2000 in Kyiv, at age 29, three weeks before his 30th birthday. He received four bullet wounds in the incident. Klimenko was working as a car salesman at the time of his death.

Over 300 athletes, coaches and friends attended the funeral.

== International competitions ==
Year	Competition	Venue	Position	Notes
Representing the Soviet Union
1988	World Junior Championships	Sudbury, Canada	1st	18.92 m
1989	European Junior Championships	Varaždin, Yugoslavia	1st	19.38 m
1991	World Championships	Tokyo, Japan	3rd	20.34 m
1991	Universiade	Sheffield, United Kingdom	1st	19.35 m
Representing the Commonwealth of Independent States
1992	European Indoor Championships	Genoa, Italy	2nd	20.02 m
1992	Olympic Games	Barcelona, Spain	8th	20.23 m
1993	World Indoor Championships	Toronto, Ontario, Canada	4th	20.58 m
Representing Ukraine
1993	Universiade	Buffalo, United States	1st	19.72 m
1994	European Championships	Helsinki, Finland	1st	20.78 m
1994	World Cup	London, United Kingdom	2nd	19.16 m
1995	World Championships	Gothenburg, Sweden	12th	18.26 m
1996	Olympic Games	Atlanta, United States	—	NM
