= Paul Edwards (shot putter) =

British shot putter

Personal information
- Nationality: British (English)
- Born: 16 February 1959 (age 67) Chiswick, Greater London. England
- Height: 186 cm (6 ft 1 in)
- Weight: 133 kg (293 lb)

Sport
- Sport: Athletics
- Event: Shot put
- Club: Walton AC; Belgrave Harriers
Medal record
Men's Athletics
Representing Wales
Commonwealth Games
Bronze medal – third place	1990 Auckland	Shot Put

Paul Michael Edwards (born 16 February 1959) is a former athlete who competed in the men's shot put at the 1988 Summer Olympics and the 1992 Summer Olympics.

== Biography ==
=== Athletics career ===
Edwards was affiliated with the Walton Athletic Club and Belgrave Harriers in London. He competed for both Wales and England during his career and twice represented Great Britain at the Olympic Games in 1988 and 1992.

He represented Great Britain 43 time and represented Great Britain in decathlon and held Welsh national records at shot put, discus and decathlon and won 9 Welsh titles.

Edwards was a ten-times British shot put champion after winning the British AAA Championships title for the first time at the 1987 AAA Championships and subsequently in 1990, 1991, 1992 and 1994. He also won the UK Athletics Championships five times from 1989 to 1993.

=== Doping ===
2013 court ruling

In 1994 Edwards failed two drugs tests. The first sample was from the 1994 European Athletics Championships in Helsinki and was positive for a cocktail of banned substances, including anabolic steroids, raised testosterone and the stimulant pseudoephedrine. The second sample was from two days later, home in Britain. Edwards was given a four-year ban from sports for these anti-doping rule violations. In 1997, while he was still banned, he was tested out of competition and was found to be positive for testosterone. He subsequently received a lifetime doping ban.

Edwards has previously raised Freedom Of Information Act requests to King's College London to help clear his name; it has also been the subject of parliamentary questions. A legal ruling from the British High Courts of Justice dated 29 November 2013 further substantiates the irregularities which form the basis of Edwards' ongoing efforts to clear his name. The judge suggested that as Edwards was sure of his innocence much earlier he should have taken High Court action sooner even though not at the time in possession of documentary proof of the irregularities invalidating his tests. This permitted dismissal of the Edwards suit on Statute of Limitations grounds without the defendants being required to address the factual issues. The documented evidence of irregularities presented by Edwards to the High Court included anomalous sampling procedure, chain of custody breaches and numerous problems with the analysis identified in 2005/6 by an expert in the field working at Imperial College London at the time.
