= Quality Hotel 33, Oslo =

Hotel in Oslo, Norway

Quality Hotel 33
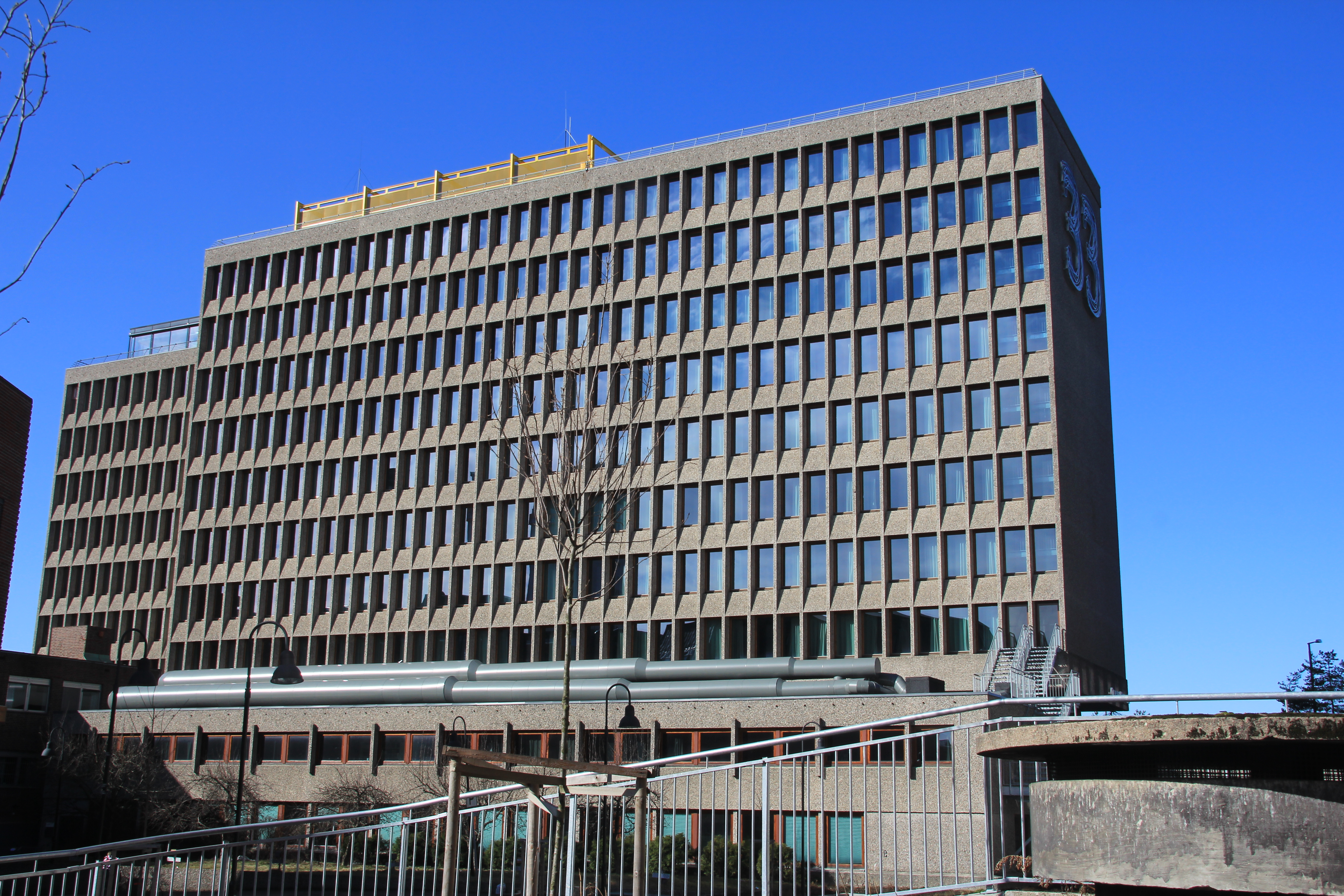
- Fascade towards northeast

- Location in Oslo

General information
- Coordinates: 59°55′40″N 10°49′00″E
- Opening: 2007

Technical details
- Floor count: 9

Other information
- Number of rooms: 242
- Number of restaurants: 2

Quality Hotel 33 is a Strawberry hotel situated along the National Road 163, number 33, at Økern in Oslo.

The hotel is placed in the former administration building of the Standard Telephones and Cables, drawn by architect Erling Viksjø. The building was refurbished to become a hotel in 2007.

== Gallery ==
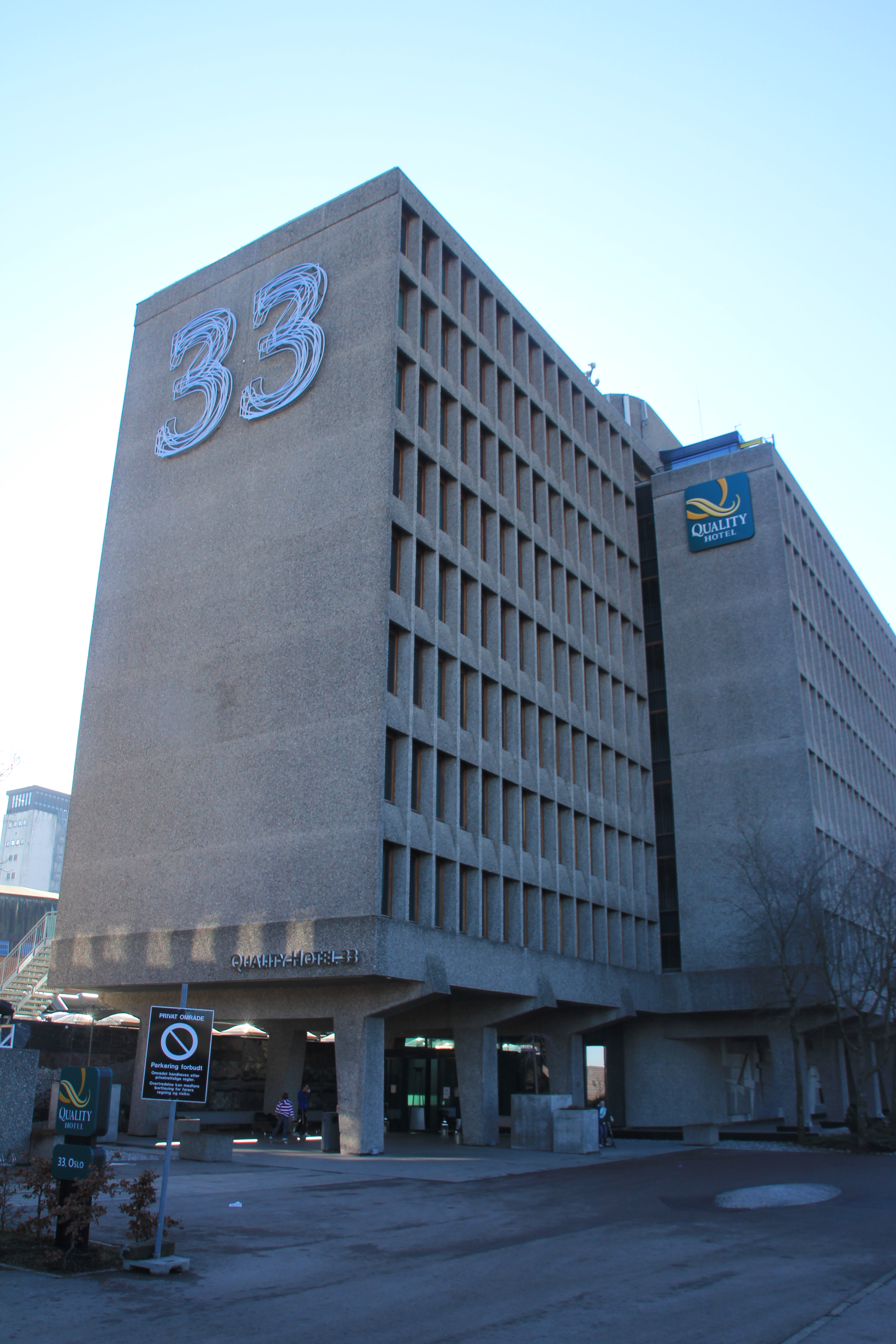
The entrance

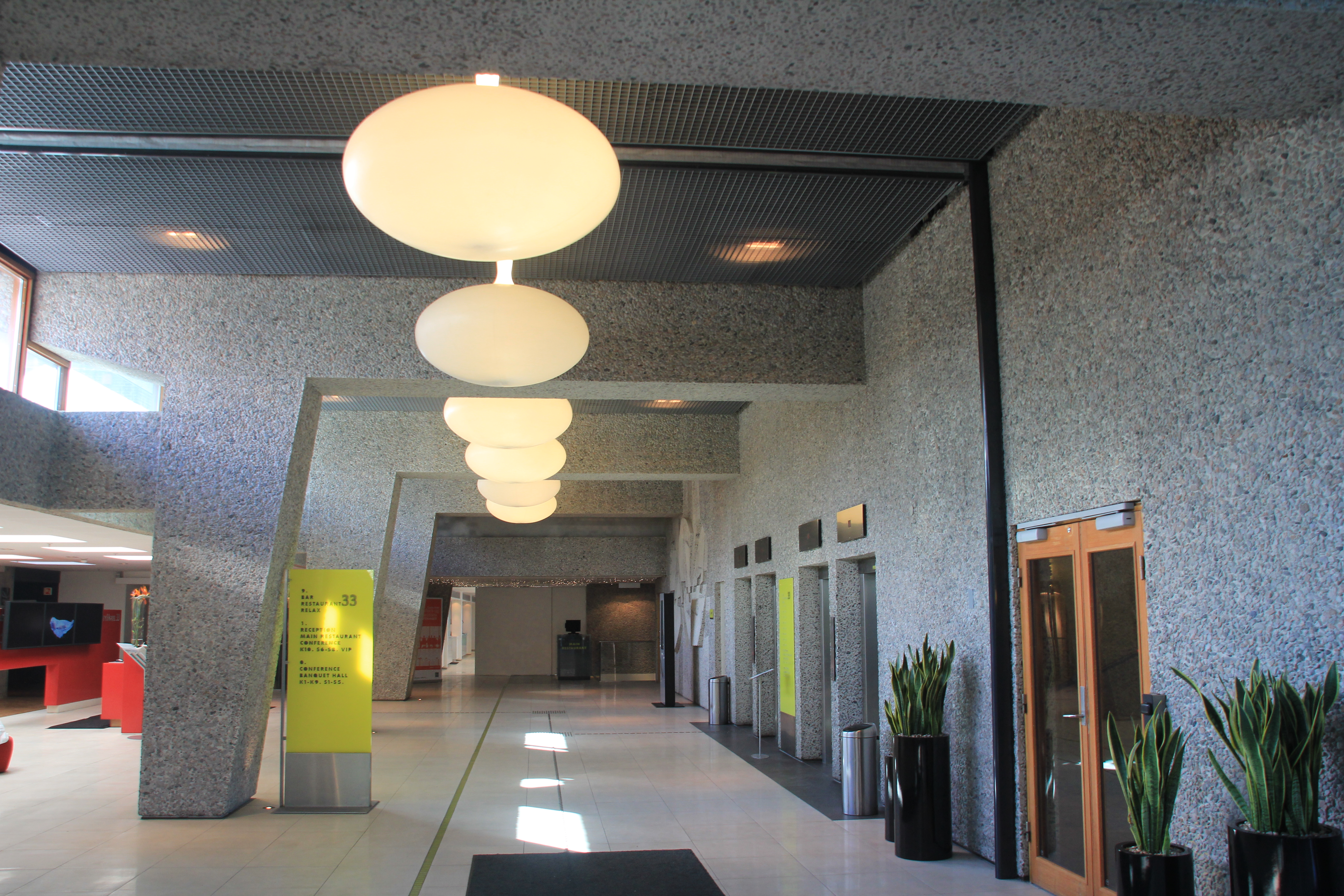
The hotel lobby

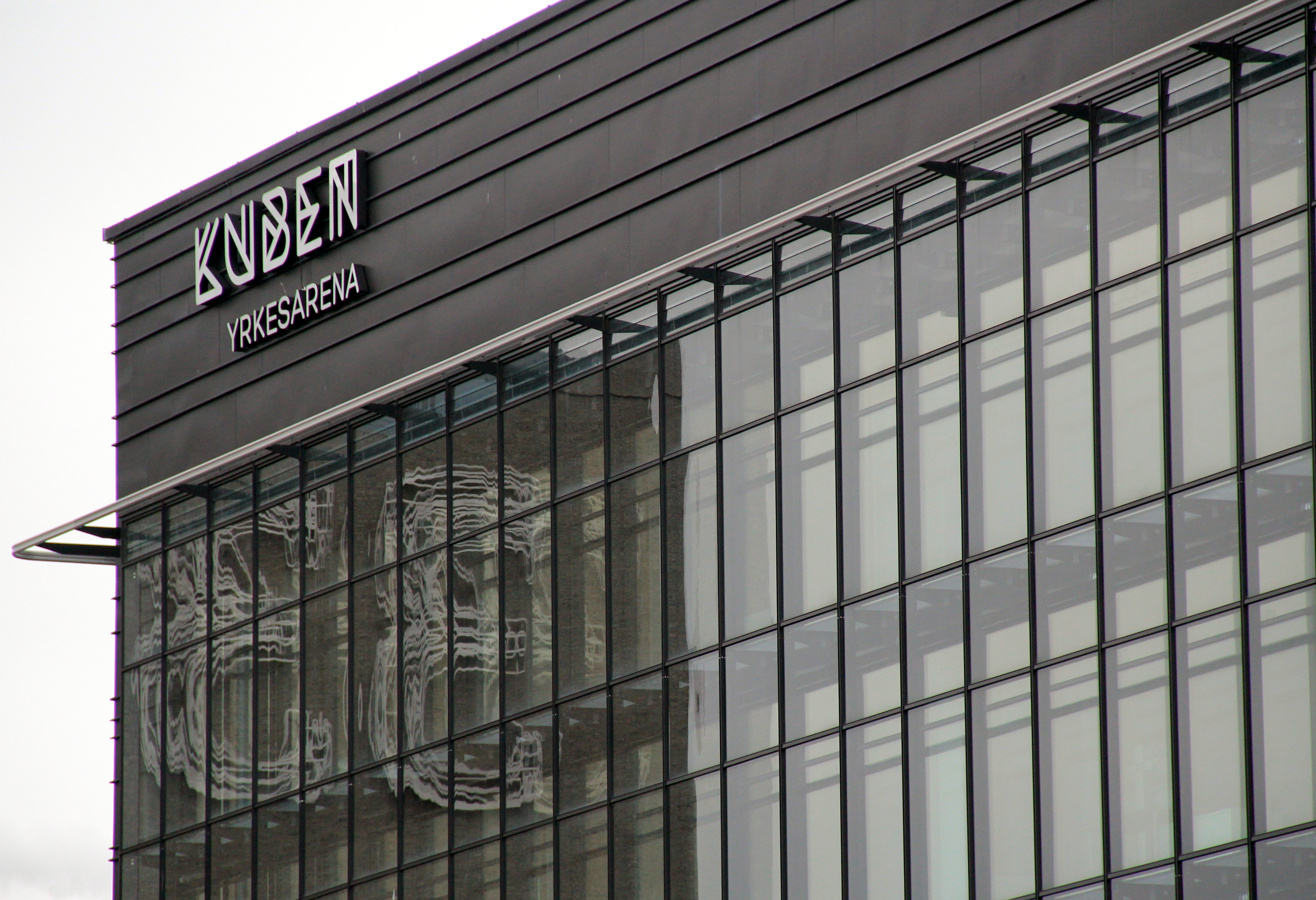
The reflection of the logo, "33", is visible in the windows of the modern Kuben Upper Secondary School
