= Kuben =

Kuben (English: The Cube) may refer to:

- Kuben Vocational Arena, a centre for Vocational Education and Training in Oslo, Norway
- Kuben Upper Secondary School (Kuben videregående skole), at Økern in Oslo, Norway
- Arena Polarica, an indoor ice hockey arena in Haparanda, Sweden, is also called Kuben

== See also ==
- Qube (disambiguation)
