= Sogn Upper Secondary School =

Coordinates: 59.9495°N 10.7280°E

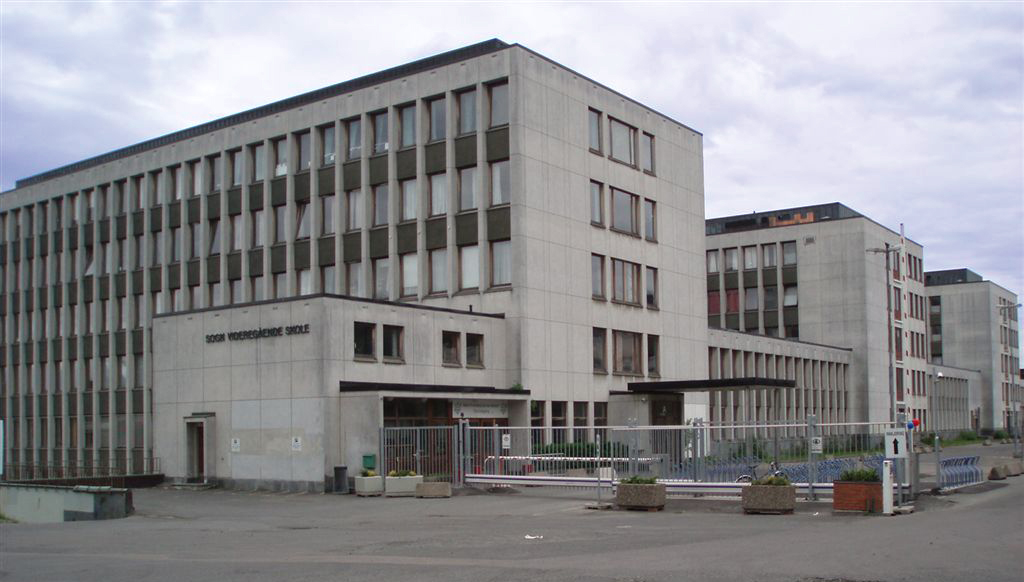
- Sogn videregående skole
- Sognsveien 80, Sogn, Oslo

Information
- School type: Public School
- Established: 1961
- Closed: 30 June 2013
- Age range: 11th through 13th (16 to 19 years)
- Educational programs: Building and construction Design, arts and crafts Electricity and electronics Healthcare, childhood and youth development Technical and industrial production ICT service

Sogn Upper Secondary School (Norwegian: Sogn videregående skole) was an upper secondary school at Ullevål in Oslo, Norway. The school was established as Sogn vocational school in 1961. For several years Sogn was Norway's largest Upper Secondary School.

In 2013 the school was disestablished and the educational programs were for the most part moved to Kuben Upper Secondary School, at Kuben Vocational Arena.
