= Bricklayer =

Person who lays brick

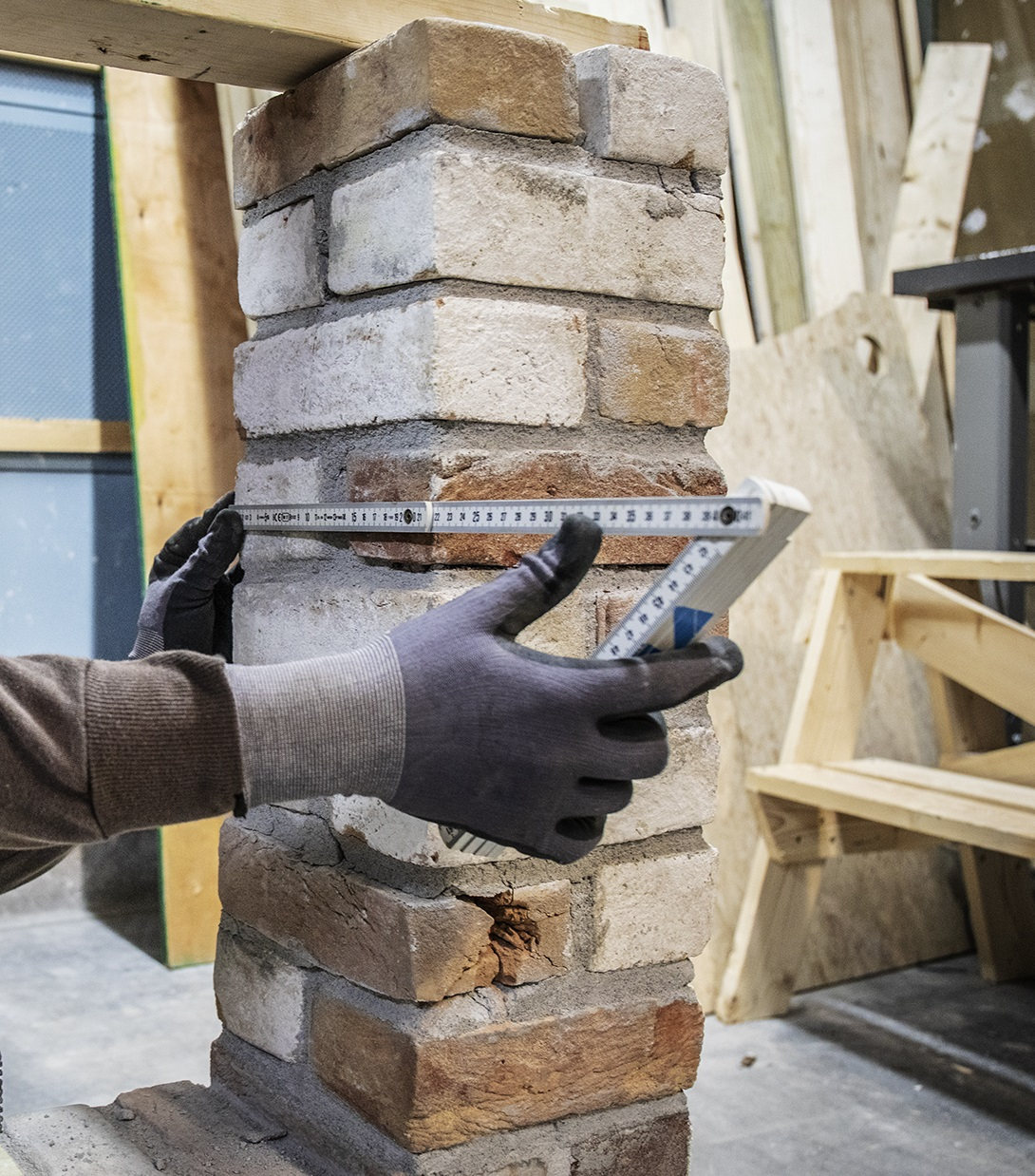
- Bricklayer apprentice practising at Kuben Vocational Arena in Oslo, Norway

Occupation
- Synonyms: Builder, construction worker
- Occupation type: Craftsperson
- Activity sectors: Construction

Description
- Education required: Apprenticeship
- Fields of employment: Civil engineering

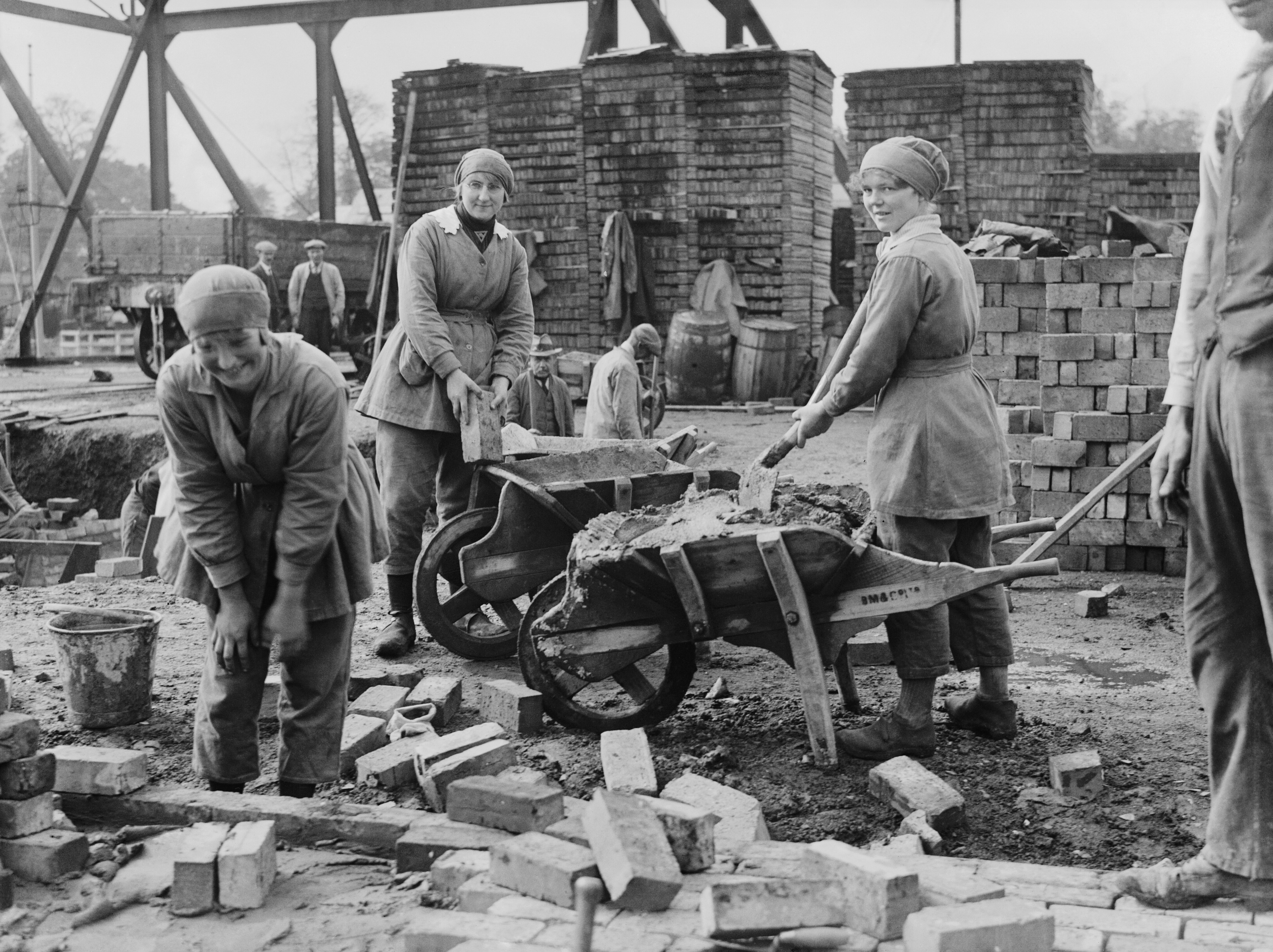
A team of bricklayers preparing to lay courses of bricks (1917)

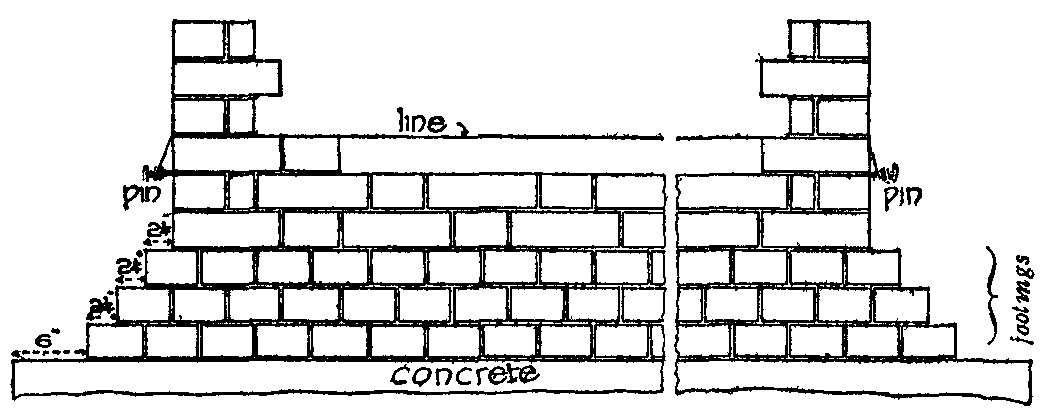
Illustration of how the bricklayer, on clearing the footings of a wall, builds up six or eight courses of bricks at the external angles

A bricklayer, which is related to but different from a mason, is a craftsperson and tradesperson who lays bricks to construct brickwork. The terms also refer to personnel who use blocks to construct blockwork walls and other forms of masonry. In British and Australian English, a bricklayer is colloquially known as a "brickie". A stone mason is one who lays any combination of stones, cinder blocks, and bricks in the construction of building walls and other works. Bricklaying is a part of masonry.

Bricklaying may also be enjoyed as a hobby. For example, the former British Prime Minister Winston Churchill did bricklaying as a hobby.

Bricklayers occasionally enter competitions where both speed and accuracy are judged. The largest is the "Spec-Mix Bricklayer 500" held annually in Las Vegas, Nevada, USA.

== Required training ==
Professional bricklayers usually go through a formal apprenticeship which includes about three to four years of on-the-job training combined with classroom instruction, though some bricklayers may learn entirely from on-the-job experience. Unions and employers may offer apprenticeships, which allow individuals with little or no experience in bricklaying to learn fundamental skills under a more experienced employee. Contemporary masons in many countries must attend trade school and/or serve apprenticeships in order to complete curricula signifying that they understand fundamental related concepts such as the effects of humidity and water ingress, thermal insulation, and general knowledge regarding the science of construction materials, as well as occupational health and safety.

== In fiction and popular culture ==
- Italian-American author John Fante featured brick hod carriers, bricklayers, and stonemasons prominently in several novels and short stories. This was due to the autobiographical nature of much of Fante's writing; his father, Nick, an Italian-born bricklayer descended from — at least in Fante's fictions — a long line of Italian artisan bricklayers and stonemasons. Fante also spent a significant portion of his youth apprenticed to his father.
- In Aleksandr Solzhenitsyn's One Day in the Life of Ivan Denisovich, the title character, a Gulag prisoner, worked as a bricklayer.
- The long-running British educational TV series Look and Read featured "Bill the Brickie" ("brickie" being a British and Australian colloquialism for "bricklayer"), who would 'build' words with bricks to demonstrate the use of morphemes, such as '-ed' or '-ing'.
- In 2021, Cristiano Ronaldo's mother, Dolores Aveiro, stated in an interview for Sporting Clube de Portugal's official television channel (Sporting TV) that her son would have become a bricklayer if he hadn't become a professional football player.
- In 2024, The Bricklayer, an American action thriller film directed by Renny Harlin and written by Hanna Weg and Matt Johnson, based on the 2010 novel of the same name by Paul Lindsay, who used the pen name Noah Boyd, was released.
- Roald Dahl's 1977 short story The Hitchhiker features a character that is employed as a hod carrier.

== See also ==
- Architectural Forum – American magazine
- Dry stone – Construction method
- Guild – Association of artisans or merchants
- Stonemasonry – Creation of buildings, structures, and sculpture using stone
