= Nils Stian Stiansen =

Norwegian businessman (1900–1974)

Nils Stian Stiansen (16 August 1900 – 25 July 1974) was a Norwegian building contractor.

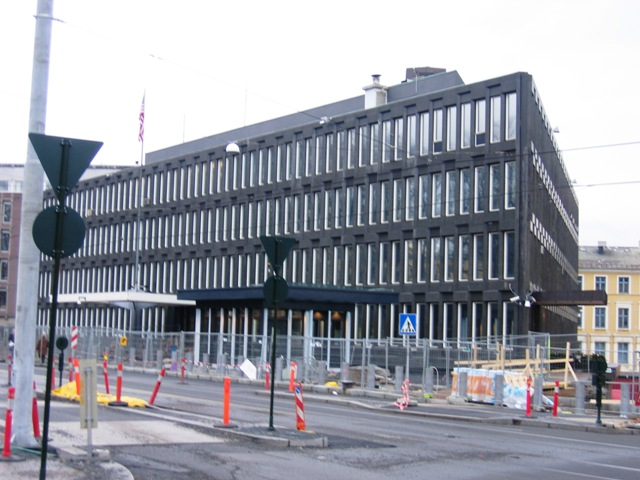
Stiansen built the Embassy of the United States, Oslo

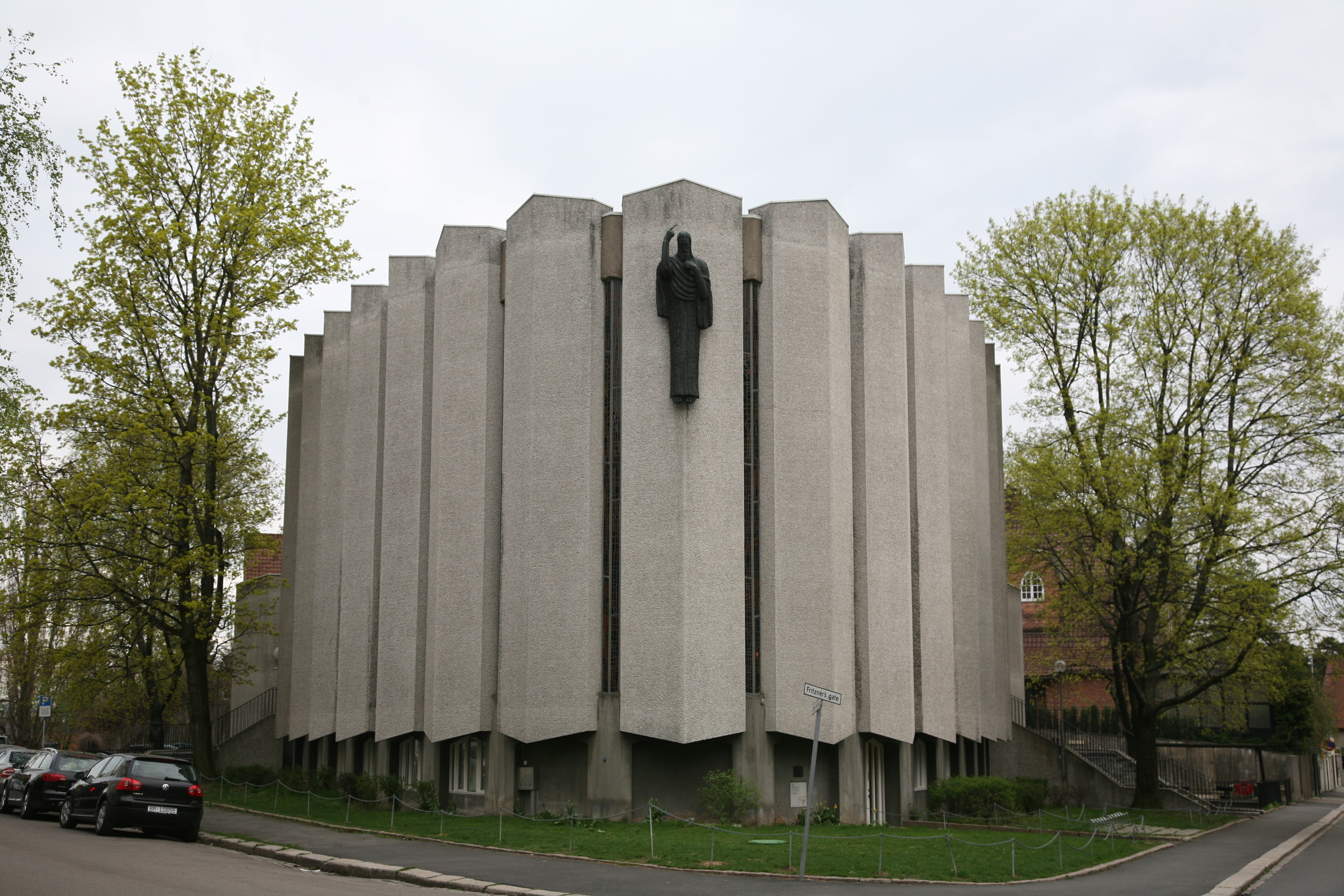
The American Lutheran Congregation, Oslo

He was born in Fevik, a son of Peder Stiansen and Inga Marie Knudsen. He operated as building contractor in Oslo from 1924, and constructed a number of residential houses and larger building complexes, a total of about 5,000 apartments. Among his projects were Bakkehaugen, Hoff Terrasse, Øvrevollkollektivet, Økernbråten and Tokerud. He also constructed the American Embassy and the American Lutheran Church in Oslo. He was decorated Knight of the Order of St. Olav in 1960. He died in 1974 and was buried at Vestre gravlund.
