= Kjell Ove Hauge =

Norwegian shot putter and discus thrower

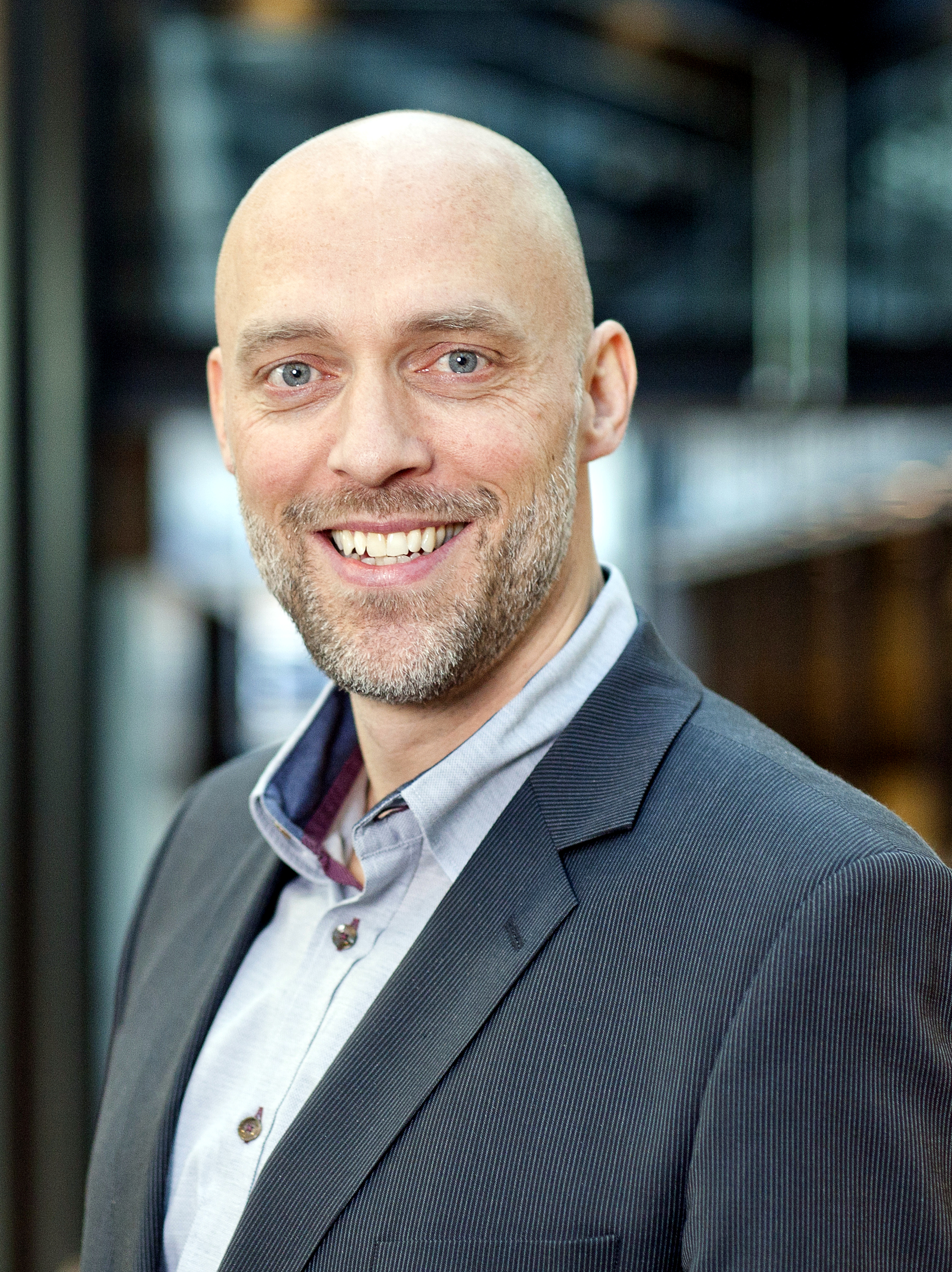
- Hauge in October 2014

Personal information
- Nationality: Norwegian
- Born: 20 February 1969 (age 57) Sandane, Norway
- Home town: Oslo, Norway
- Education: Western Norway University of Applied Sciences; University of Texas at El Paso; Østfold University College; BI Norwegian Business School
- Occupation: Principal
- Years active: 1986–1998
- Height: 194 cm (6 ft 4 in)
- Weight: 120 kg (265 lb) (1998)
- Website: kjellove.wordpress.com (Norwegian)

Sport
- Country: Norway
- Sport: Track and field
- Event(s): Shot put, discus
- University team: UTEP Miners and Lady Miners
- Coached by: Robert Parker

Achievements and titles
- National finals: Norwegian Athletics Championships, Shot put – gold: 1993, 1994, 1996, 1997
- Personal best(s): Shot put: 20.39 meters (66.9 ft); Discus: 63.10 metres (207.0 ft)
- Updated on 24 February 2019

Kjell Ove Hauge (born 20 February 1969) is a Norwegian retired shot putter and discus thrower, turned educator, later Head teacher. As an athlete he represented Gloppen Athletics club. Since July 2013 Hauge is Principal at Kuben Upper Secondary School, the largest High School in Oslo.

== Biography ==
Hauge was born in the town of Sandane at the west coast of Norway. He graduated from Firda Upper Secondary High School in 1988 and studied after this, physical science at Sogn og Fjordane University College. From 1989 he did his conscription. From the fall of 1990 he was offered a scholarship from University of Texas at El Paso, got an early discharge from the military and entered the UTEP Miners Track and Field program. He got his Bachelor of Science in kinesiology at UTEP.

After his athletic career he worked as a sports teacher at Bjerke Upper Secondary School in Oslo. He got the position of director of school development at Bjerke, and graduated Master of management from BI Norwegian Business School in 2009. From 2010 her was project manager for a vocational education drop-out project for the City of Oslo Education Authority. In July 2013 he became Principal at Oslos largest upper secondary school, Kuben Upper Secondary School.

== Academic career ==
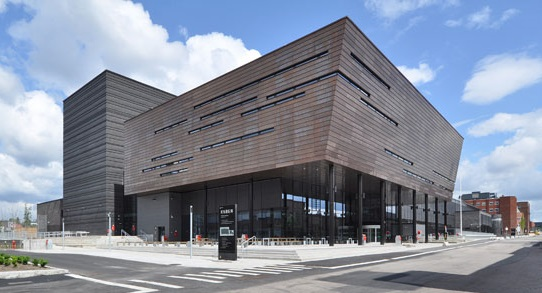
Since 2013 Hauge has been head of Kuben Upper Secondary School in Oslo.

Kuben Upper Secondary School is the municipality of Oslo's major investment in Vocational education. Hauge took over the brand new school in 2013, a landmark in the burrow of Bjerke, and is responsible for 1600 students and 300 employees. Under Hauge's management the school has become a beacon within vocational education and one of the most applied schools in Oslo.

In 2017 Kuben received The European Quality Label for prominent dropout prevention work. Kuben then was awarded the Benjamin Prize of 2018 for systematic work against racism and discrimination.

Entrepreneurial work is established as a central part of the school's teaching and in 2022 Kuben won JA Europe The Entrepreneurial School Awards 2022.

== Athletic career ==
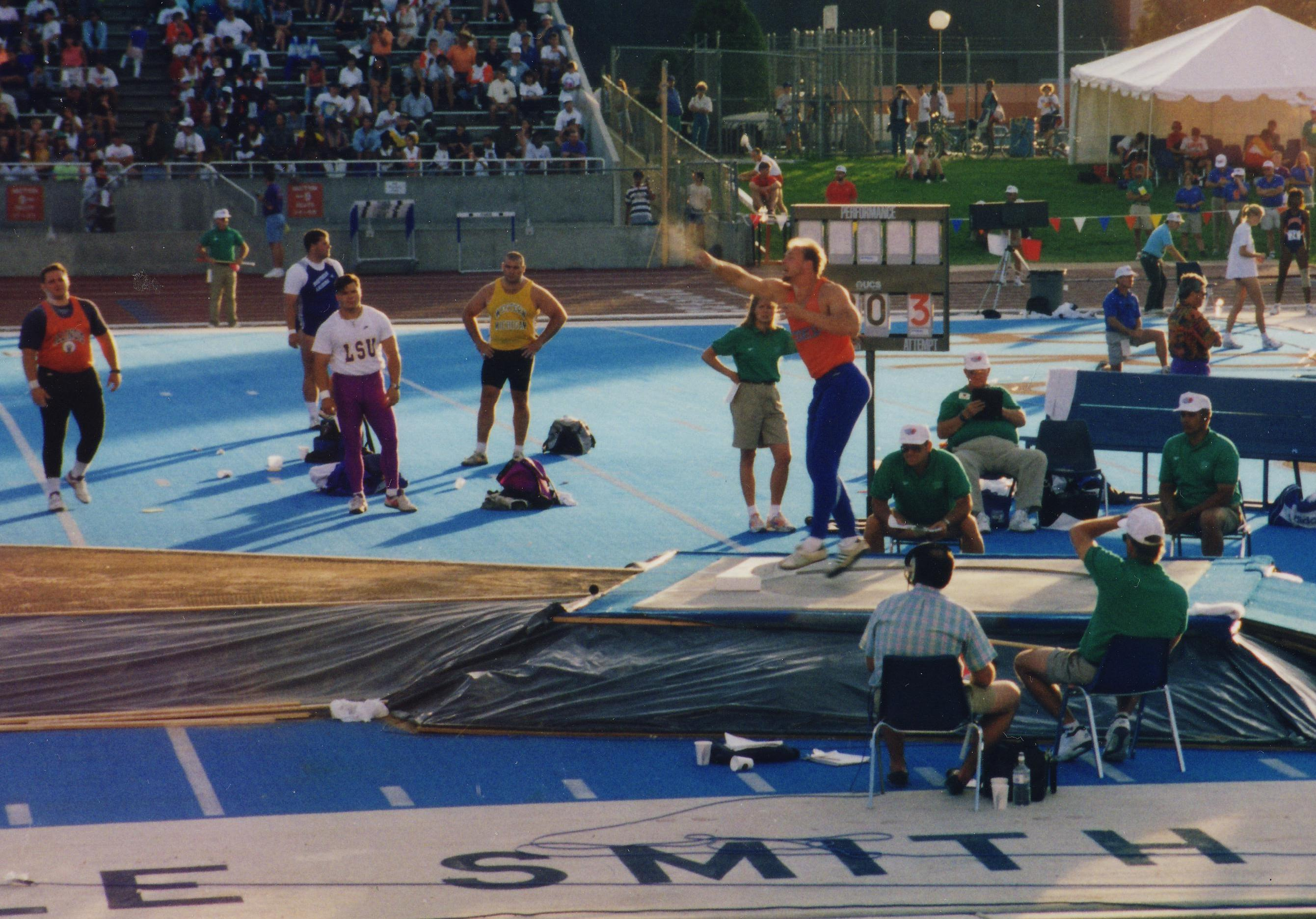
Hauge at the NCAA Division I Championships in Boise, Idaho.

He finished eleventh at the 1997 IAAF World Indoor Championships. In addition he competed at the 1994 European Championships and the 1997 World Championships without reaching the final round. He became Norwegian shot put champion in 1993, 1994, 1996 and 1997

In 1994 Hauge finished runner up at the NCAA championships at Boise, Idaho, passing the 20 metres (66 ft) limit for the first time with 20.07 m. He lost only to Brent Noon, beating the upcoming World champion John Godina by more than 50 centimetres (20 in).

Hauge enrolled at UTEP in 1990 and first worked with throws coach Steve Lemke, and from the fall of 1993, Robert Parker. Parker stayed on as Hauges coach throughout his career.

His personal best in shot put, 20.39 metres (66.9 ft), achieved in May 1998 in Eugene. This ranks him sixth all time among Norwegian shot putters, behind Lars Arvid Nilsen, Marcus Thomsen, Georg Andersen, Jan Sagedal and Knut Hjeltnes. His personal best in discus throw is 63.10 metres (207.0 ft), achieved in June 1997 in Tønsberg.

In June 1998 Hauge tested positive for the anabolic steroid Metandienone. He admitted to having used the substance in an attempt to repair a career ending injury, and retired from athletics.

=== Major competitions ===
Year	Competition	Venue	Position	Event	Notes
Representing Norway
1994	NCAA Championships	Boise, United States	Silver	Shot put	20,07 m
1994	European Championships	Helsinki, Finland	23rd	Shot put	18.23 m
1994	European Cup	Istanbul, Turkey	Gold	Discus	59.14 m
1996	IAAF Grand Prix Final	Milan, Italy	8th	Shot put	19,34 m
1997	World Indoor Championships	Paris, France	11th	Shot put	19,42 m
1997	World Championships	Athens, Greece	25th	Shot put	18,37 m
1997	World Championships	Athens, Greece	33rd	Discus	57,00 m
1997	European Cup	Munich, Germany	4th	Shot put	19,04 m
1997	European Cup	Munich, Germany	5th	Discus	56,60 m
1998	European Cup	Malmö, Sweden	Gold	Shot put	20,07 m

== See also ==
- List of sportspeople sanctioned for doping offences
- People with surname Hauge

== External pages ==
- IAAF profile
