= Mcast =

Mcast may refer to:

- MCAST, Malta College of Arts, Science and Technology
- multicast — simultaneous delivery of information to a group of destinations
