= Benjamin Prize =

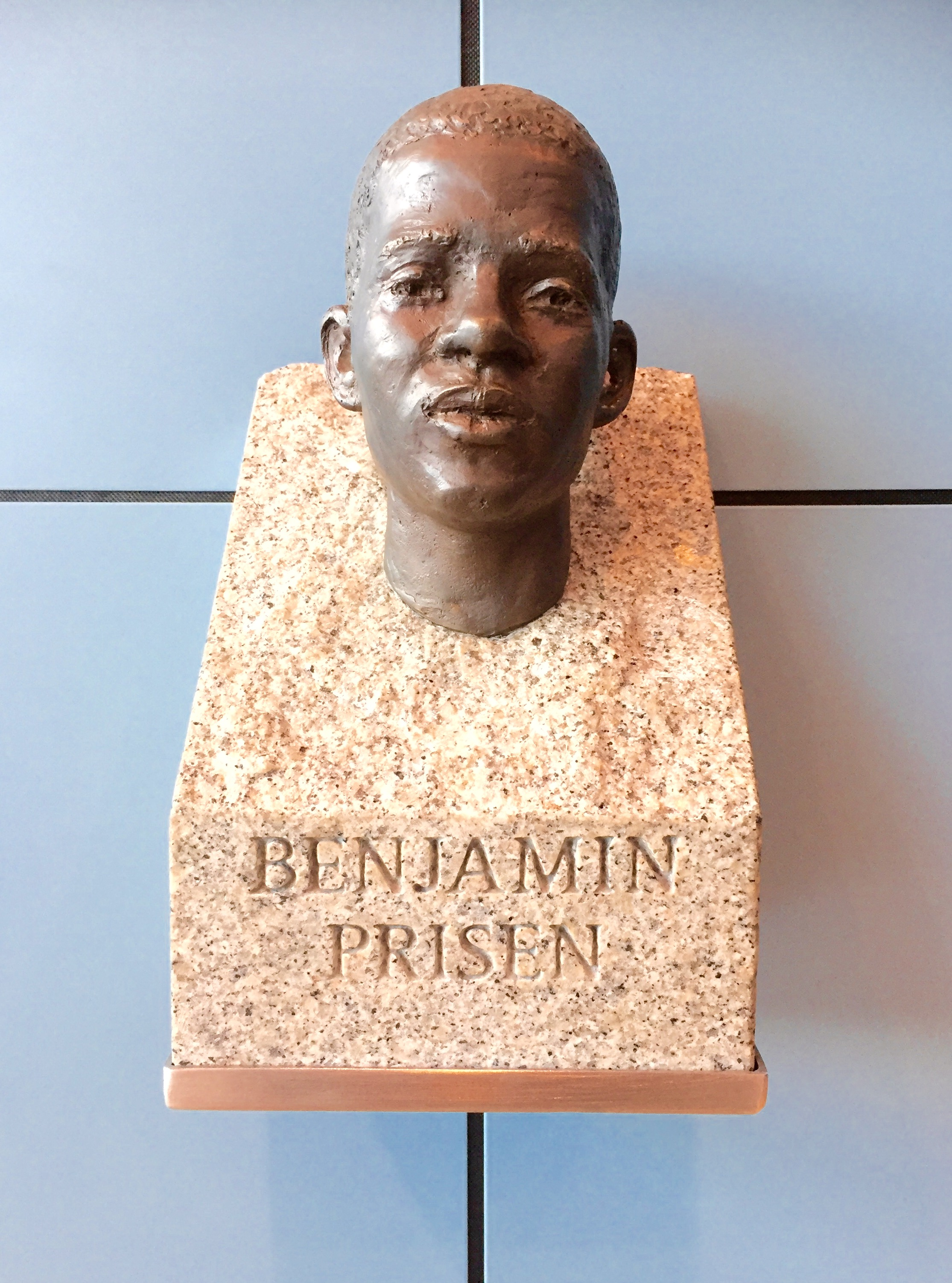
The Benjamin Prize won by Sogn Upper Secondary School in 2008 is exhibited in the foyer of Kuben Upper Secondary School, winner of the Benjamin Prize in 2018

The Benjamin Prize was established as a Norwegian prize to counter racism in 2002. The prize is awarded in memory of Benjamin Hermansen, who at the age of 15 years, was murdered in Holmlia, Søndre Nordstrand in Oslo, Norway. The death was racially motivated.

The prize is awarded each year on 27 January in conjunction with the commemoration of the Holocaust. On this date Soviet forces liberated Nazi concentration camps in Auschwitz and Birkenau. The prize is awarded to a school that actively works against racism and discrimination.

The work for which the award is given is to be characterized by:

- Anchoring: The school's work against racism and discrimination represent a long-term commitment.
- Involvement: The school's work against racism and discrimination involves faculty and students at the school.
- Highlighting: The school's work against racism and discrimination is visible both in the school and in the broader community.

The prize consists of 250,000 kroner, and a miniature bust of Benjamin Hermansen, created by Ivar Sjaastad. The original bust is placed at Holmlia.

The Norwegian Directorate for Education and Training awards the prize. The jury which determines the recipient consisted of Marit Hermansen (Benjamin’s mother) until her death in 2019. Since, it is represented by members from the Norwegian Center Against Racism, the Sami Parliament of Norway, Union of Education Norway, School Student Union of Norway, Parents Committee for Primary and Lower Secondary Education, and the Norwegian Center for Studies of Holocaust and Religious Minorities.

== Winners ==
- 2002 — Sunndal Upper Secondary School in Sunndalsøra in Sunndal Municipality
- 2003 — Fjell School in Drammen in Drammen Municipality
- 2004 — Ila School in Trondheim in Trondheim Municipality
- 2005 — Gommerud School in Rykkinn in Bærum Municipality
- 2006 — Mandal Upper Secondary School in Mandal in Mandal Municipality
- 2007 — Skotselv School in Skotselv in Øvre Eiker Municipality
- 2008 — Sogn Upper Secondary School in Nordre Aker in Oslo Municipality
- 2009 — Skullerud School in Skullerud in Oslo Municipality
- 2010 — Hagaløkka School in Asker in Asker Municipality
- 2011 — Karuss School in Kristiansand in Kristiansand Municipality
- 2012 — Greveskogen Upper Secondary School in Tønsberg in Tønsberg Municipality
- 2013 — Brandengen Upper Secondary School in Drammen in Drammen Municipality
- 2014 — Uranienborg School in Briskeby in Oslo Municipality
- 2015 — Sjøvegan Upper Secondary School in Sjøvegan in Salangen Municipality
- 2016 — Løkenåsen School in Skårer in Lørenskog Municipality
- 2017 — Høyland School in Sandnes in Sandnes Municipality
- 2018 — Kuben Upper Secondary School in Oslo Municipality
- 2019 — Alvimhaugen School in Sarpsborg in Sarpsborg Municipality
- 2020 — Glemmen Upper Secondary School in Glemmen in Fredrikstad Municipality
- 2021 – Sofienberg School in Sofienberg in Oslo Municipality
- 2022 - Selbu ungdomsskole i Trøndelag
- 2023 - Stigeråsen School in Skien
- 2024 - Gjøklep ungdomsskole in Holmestrand
- 2025 — Sandvika Upper Secondary School in Baerum Municipality
