= Ludvig Mariboe =

Norwegian businessman, publisher and politician

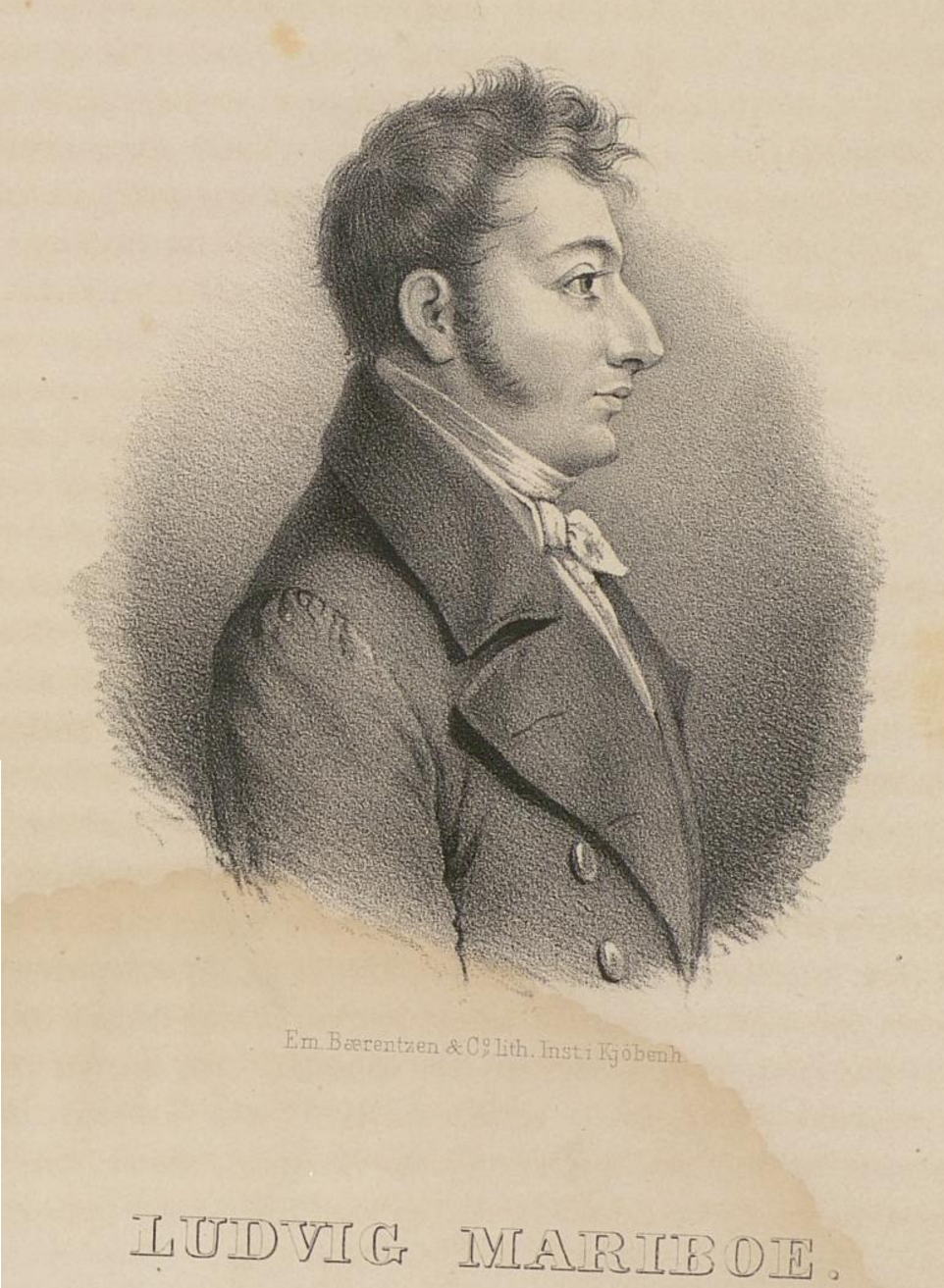
Lithograph of Ludvig Mariboe.

Ludvig Mariboe (12 October 1781 – 19 June 1841) was a Norwegian businessman, publisher and politician.
