= American Lutheran Congregation, Oslo =

Church in Oslo, Norway

Coordinates: 59°55′01.0″N 10°42′19.5″E

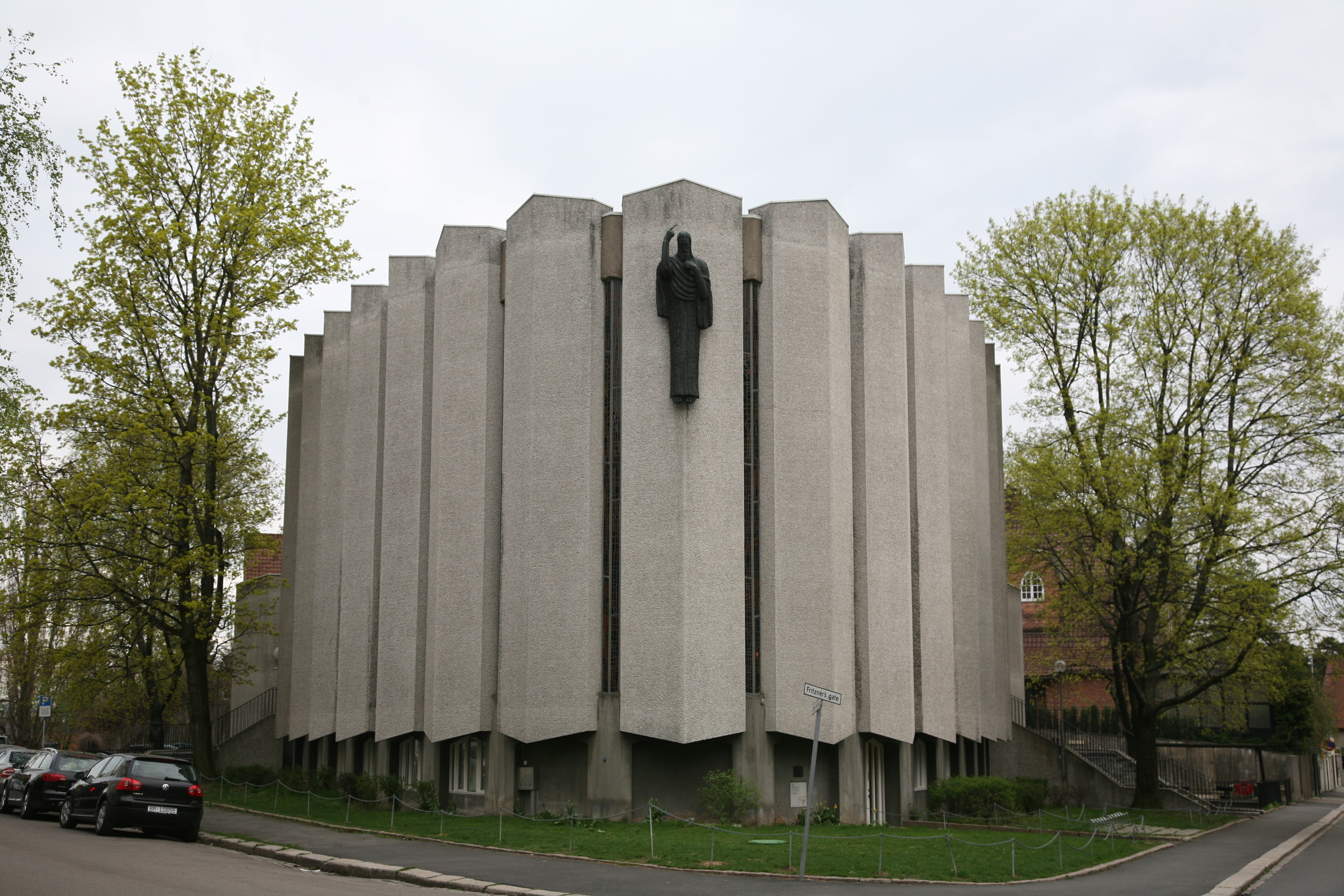
American Lutheran Church, Oslo

The American Lutheran Congregation is the largest English-speaking church in Oslo, Norway.

The American Lutheran Congregation in Oslo is located at Fritzners gate 15 in the neighborhood of Frogner. It was the parish church for the American Lutheran Church in Oslo, and is now affiliated with the Evangelical Lutheran Church in America. The church ministry is directed to the English-speaking short-term and long-term residents of the city, as well as embassy personnel, foreign students, refugees and tourists. Attendees include Lutherans, Anglicans, Methodists, Norwegian State Church members, Roman Catholics, Presbyterians, Baptists, and Pentecostals from many nations.

The church was consecrated on 11 October 1964. It has a church sanctuary of 400 seats. The church was designed by the American architectural firm Sövik, Mathre, and Madson of Northfield, Minnesota. An exterior bronze sculpture titled Christ the King by Egon Weiner, former professor of the Art Institute of Chicago, was unveiled in 1967.
