= Malta College of Arts, Science and Technology =

Vocational education institution in Malta

- Il-Kulleġġ Malti tal-Arti, Xjenza u Teknoloġija
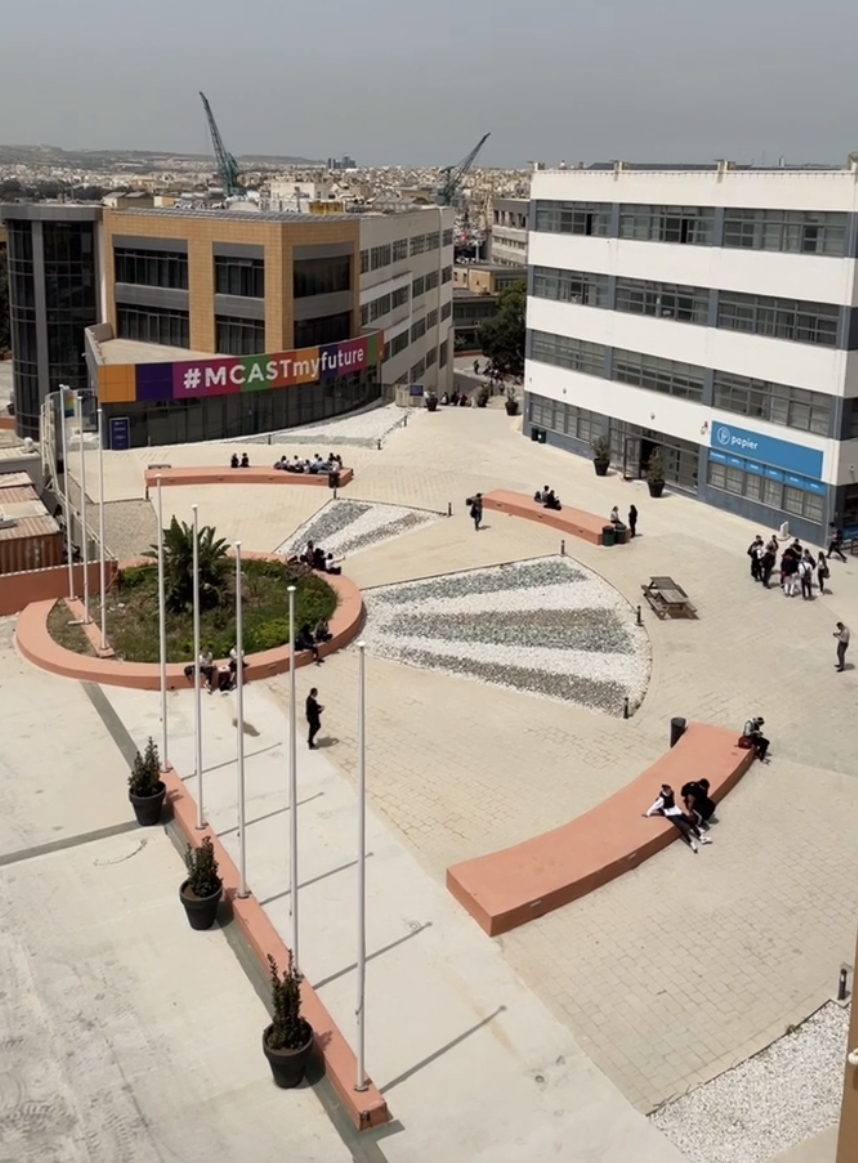
- Campus square
- Motto: Scientia et labore (Through knowledge and work)
- Type: Public
- Established: 2001
- President: Frederick Schembri
- Principal: Stephen Vella
- Students: 6,500.5 (full-time); 5,000 (part-time)
- Location: Paola, Malta; 35.8773°N 14.5063°E
- Website: www.mcast.edu.mt
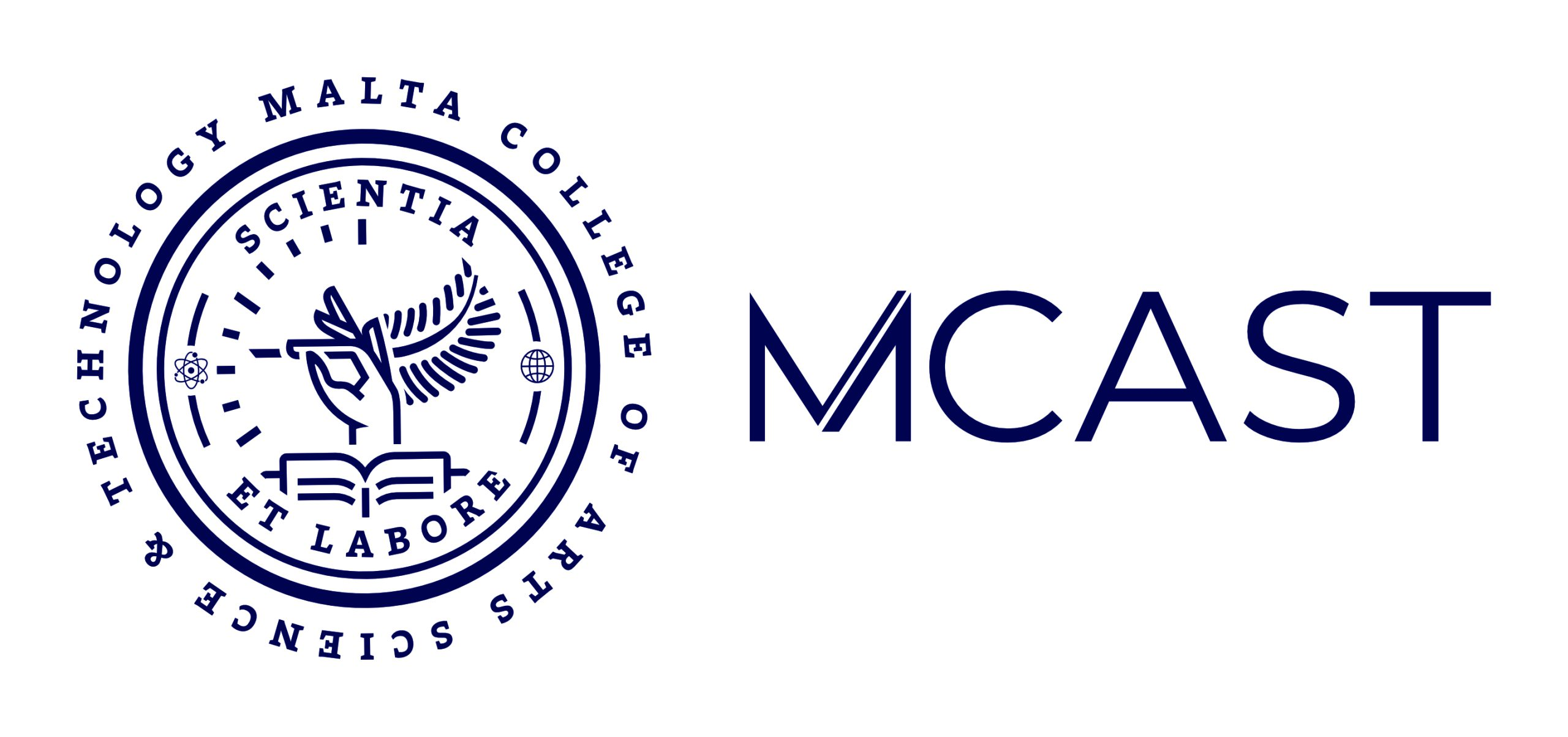

The Malta College of Arts, Science and Technology (MCAST) is a vocational education and training institution in Malta, consisting of seven institutes over four campuses.

Established in 2001, the MCAST offers 180 full-time and over 300 part-time vocational and higher education courses ranging from certificates to Doctoral degrees (MQF Level 1 to Level 8).

== Institutes ==
The following institutes make up the MCAST

- Institute of Applied Sciences
- Institute of Business Management and Commerce
- Institute for the Creative Arts
- Institute of Community Services
- Institute of Engineering and Transport
- Institute of Information and Communication Technology
- Institute for the Trades
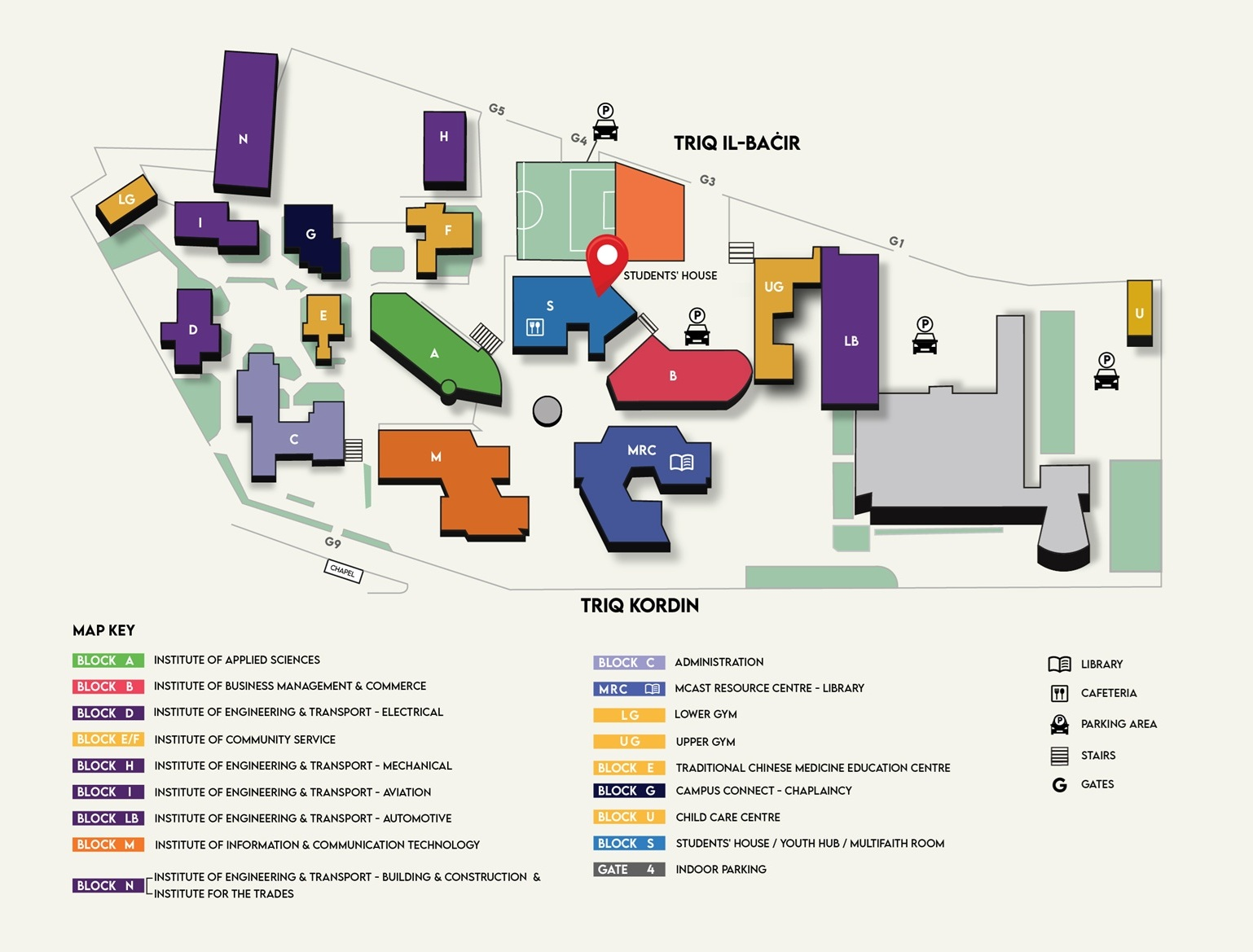
- MCAST Main Campus Map in 2026
  Centre for Learning and Employability

== Campuses ==
The following campuses make up the MCAST:

- MCAST Paola (Main Campus)
- MCAST Mosta (Institute for the Creative Arts)
- MCAST Qormi (Colloquially known as MCAST Luqa) (Institute of Applied Sciences, Centre of Agriculture, Aquatics and Animal Sciences)
- MCAST Gozo

== International collaboration ==
In 2021 MCAST made a formal collaboration with the Oslo-based Kuben Upper Secondary School, and received a class of students from the vocational programs of computer electronics and engineering. The Norwegian students attended MCAST for a full academic year.

MCAST is a founding member of the European Dual Studies University (EU4Dual), an alliance of higher education institutions aimed to creating joint courses, hosting the 2024 EU4Dual conference in its Paola campus.
