= Kuben Upper Secondary School =

Coordinates: 59°55′40″N 10°49′00″E

Kuben videregående skole
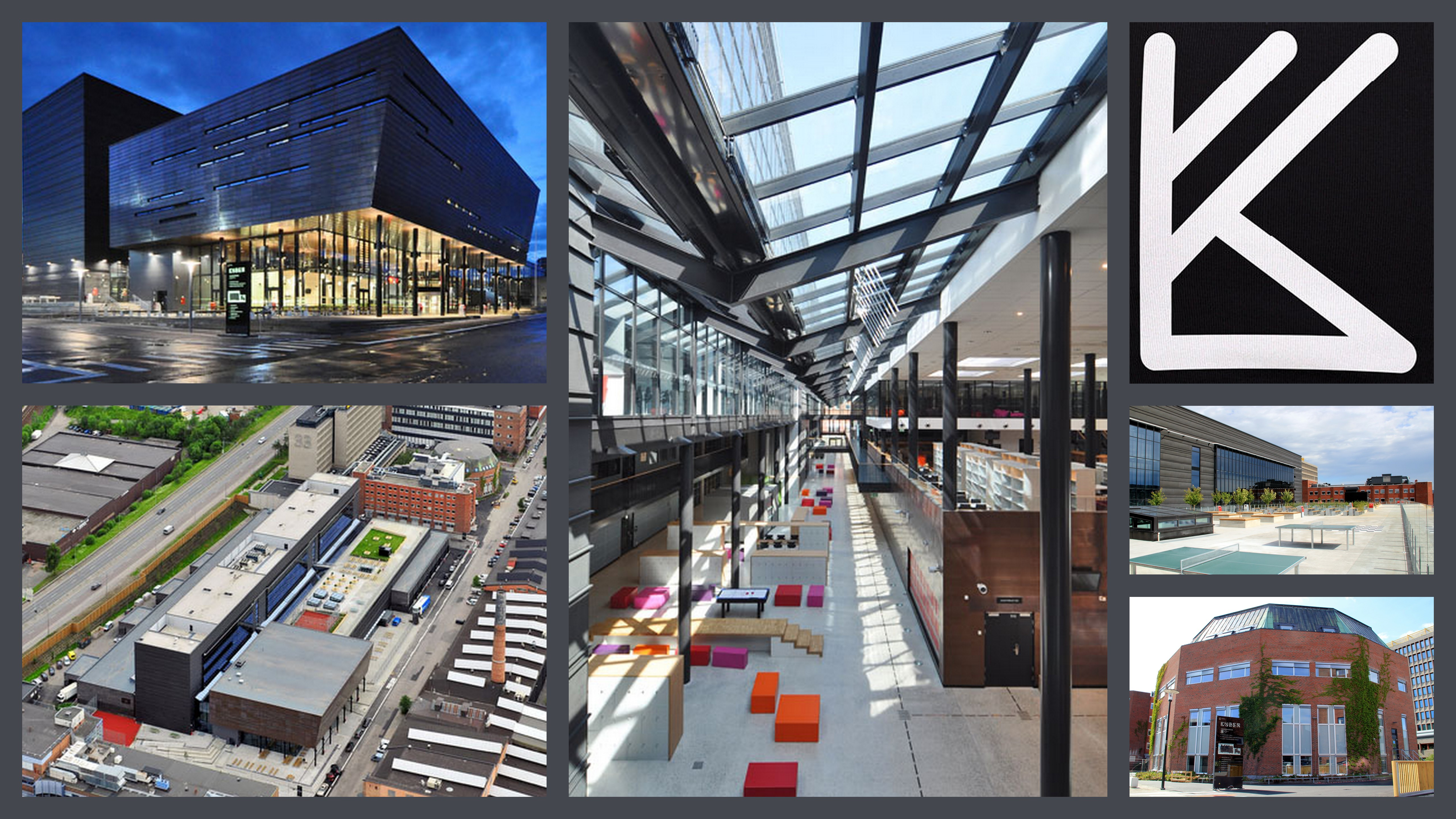
- Kuben videregående skole
- Kabelgata 10-12, Økern, Oslo

Information
- School type: Public School
- Established: 19 August 2013
- Principal: Kjell Ove Hauge
- Age range: 11th through 13th (16 to 19 years)
- Enrollment: 1,750 students (2025)
- Educational programs: Building and construction Electricity and electronics Healthcare, childhood and youth development Information technology and media production Technical and industrial production ICT service General academics
- Additional programs: Follow-up service New chance at 10th grade Supplementary programme for general university admissions certification Norwegian for minority students 16 to 19 years
- Website: https://kuben.vgs.no/

Kuben Upper Secondary School (Norwegian: Kuben videregående skole) is an upper secondary school at Økern in Oslo, Norway. The school is part of Kuben Vocational Arena, and is Oslo's largest Upper secondary school, with approximately 1,750 students (2025). Kuben shares the arena with Oslo Technical School.

The school's first principal is Kjell Ove Hauge, a former All-American and international track and field athlete.

== Educational programs ==
Kuben is offering the following trade programs: Building and construction, Electricity and electronics, Healthcare, childhood and youth development, Information technology and media production, Technical and industrial production and ICT services. The school also offers the ordinary three year specialization in general academic studies program towards college or university admissions certification. The students at general academics can choose between the program areas Natural science and mathematics studies and Languages, social science and economics studies.

For students who has completed the vocational two years in school, Kuben offers the one-year supplementary academic program for general college or university admissions certification. For students in need of more general studies before entering an upper secondary programme, Kuben offers a one-year preparatory programme for minorities towards general academics.

=== New programs ===
One of Kuben's main goals is to be a frontrunner in the development of new educational courses. Kuben offers several unique courses to the Oslo school system.

For students in Building and construction and Childhood and youth development the school offers 4 year double competence course that combines Vocational competence and general university admissions certification. After 4 years the students will have both a journeyman certificate and an Examen artium for specialization in general studies for college or university admissions certification.

Two 3-year courses combines vocational and special study competence. Both follows ordinary curricula, but the concretisation of the curricula takes place in close collaboration with relevant professional environments and are aimed at a future need for competence. One course is called The robotics course, based on electrical engineering and automation. The other is called The informatics course, based on computer science, programming, design and development of IT systems.

The secondary level study of Computers and electronics at Bournemouth and Poole College. 16 students will be offered to study in England from September to May, living with host families.

For General academics Kuben has developed the Technology program, that offers specialization within technology, innovation, research and entrepreneurship.

== Partner-school at Malta ==
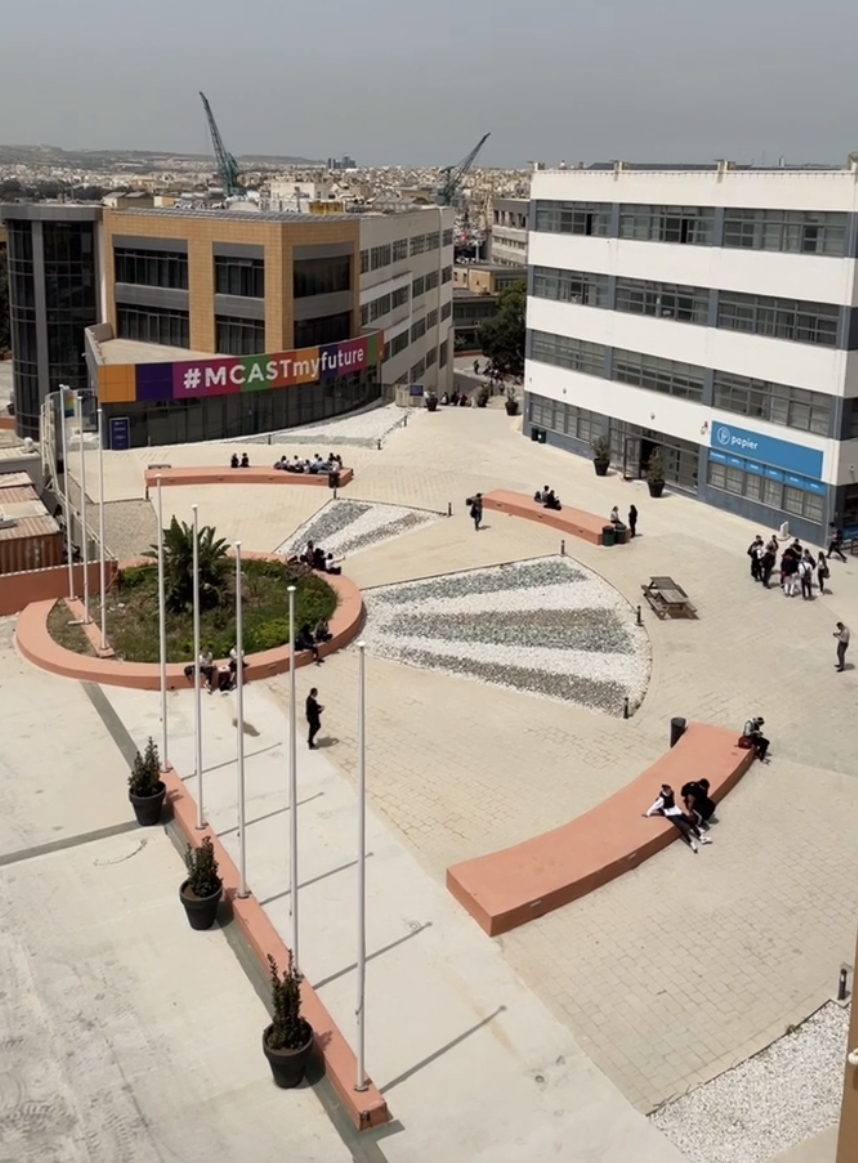
Kuben's partner school MCAST at Malta, for international exchange

Kuben's 7 year long collaboration with Bournemouth and Poole College came to a halt in 2020 because of Brexit and the COVID-19 pandemic. Two years later a new bond was made. This time with the Malta College of Arts, Science and Technology (MCAST) at Malta.

== Attention ==
- 19 August 2013: School is opened by Erna Solberg and Kristin Skogen Lund.
- October 2014: Awarded the City of Oslo's Prize for Excellent Architecture. First time awarded to a public school.
- 2014: Awarded the Award for Design Excellence from the Norwegian Design Council, for distinctive fonts in the School logo designed as an entire alphabet font set.
- November 2015: Awarded the prize for best newcomer of student councils in Oslo. Jury statement: "In a short time Kuben has established Oslo's largest student council. The prize is awarded for the thorough work that has been initiated and for a serious and good student leadership.
- February 2017: Awarded the prize for Junior Achievement Entrepreneurship School of the year in Oslo 2016. Jury statement: «Kuben has a widespread and high activity related to entrepreneurship in education. The work is firmly rooted in school plans, and a strong momentum of development. The school has good collaboration with actors outside the school, industry, public enterprises, higher education institutions, other schools and international actors.»
- 2018: Awarded the Benjamin Prize for comprehensive and systematic work against racism and discrimination.
- 2021: The Junior Achievement youth business, Tekxspeil, was elected best vocational youth business in Norway.
- March 2022: Awarded the prize for Junior Achievement Entrepreneurship School of the year in Oslo 2021. Jury statement: «Over the last years, Kuben has developed and increased activity within entrepreneurship in education. The school show an impressive ability to collaborate with other schools, the neighborhood and various academic environments. They have developed a separate plan for the work with entrepreneurship at the school and has opened for curricle practice in own student mini company.»
- April 2022: Awarded the prize for Junior Achievement Entrepreneurship School of the year in Norway The Entrepreneurial School Awards 2022
- July 2022: Awarded at the JA Europe's The Entrepreneurial School Awards 2022
- August 2023: Kuben publishes its own jubilee book for the ten first years of development and success (ISBN 9788230360606 )
- September 2023: Soul-artist and Kuben-alumni, Adama Janlo, releases the Kuben song, «You got this»

== Gallery ==
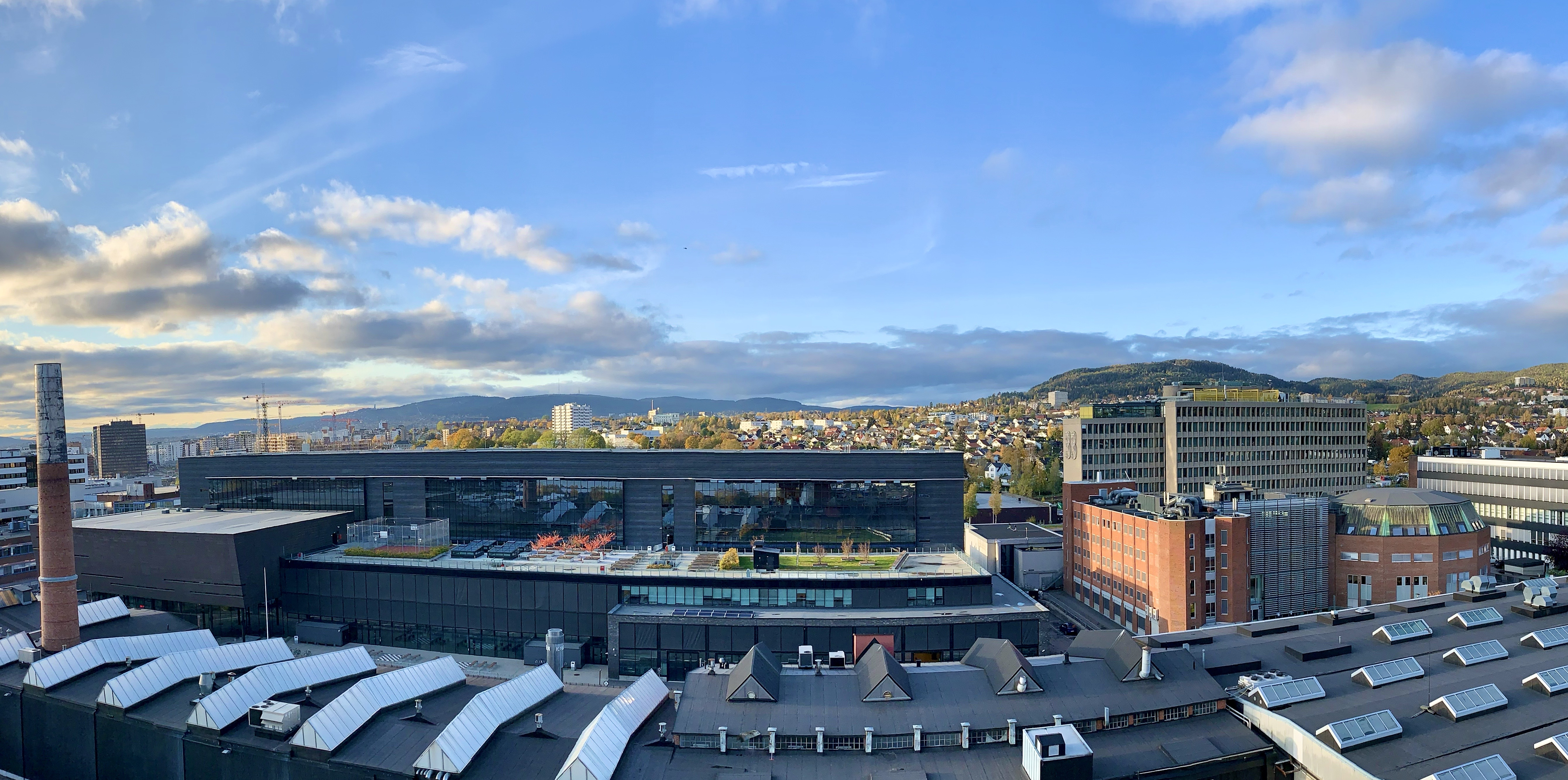
Kubens facade from the south

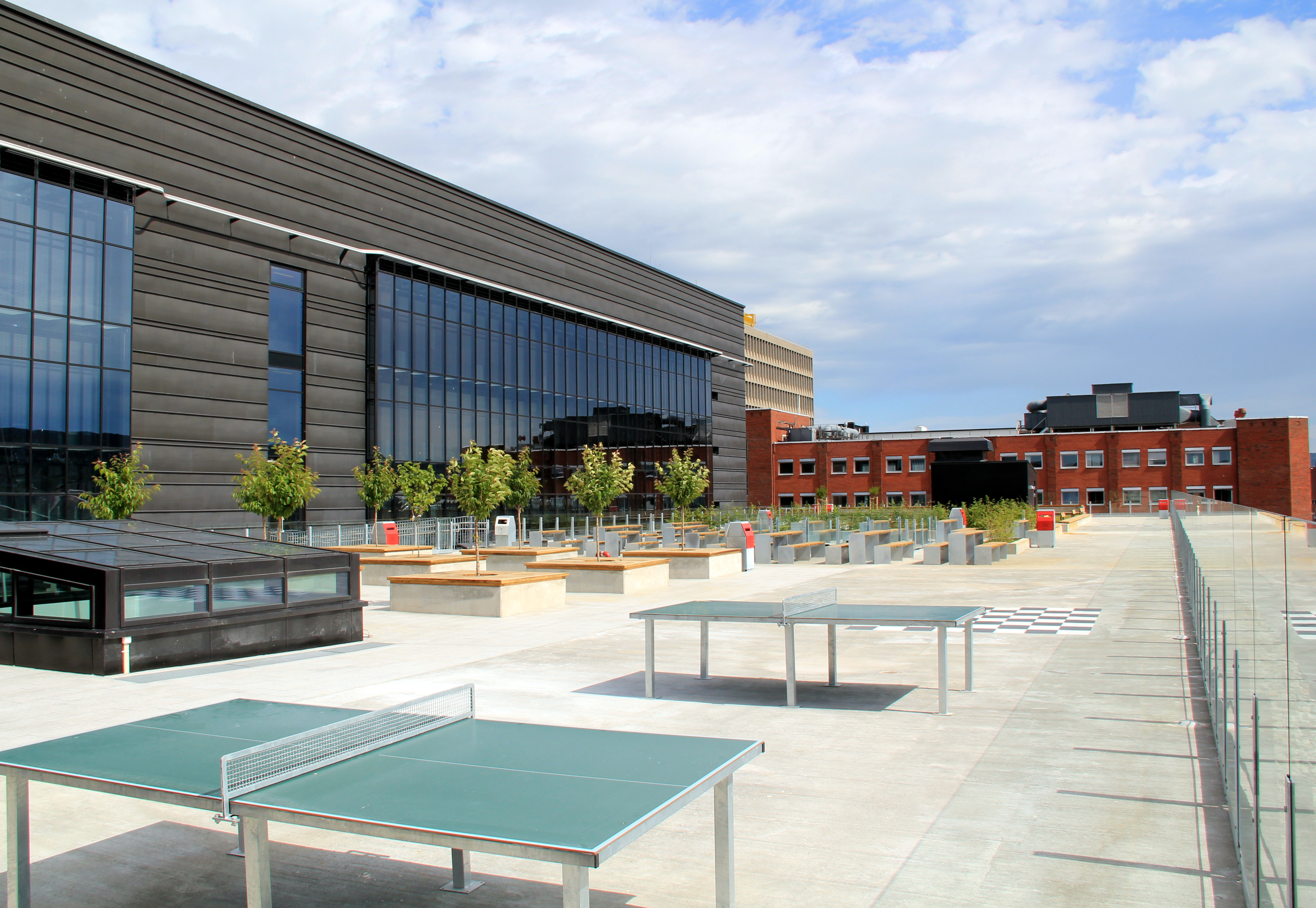
The schoolyard is placed on the roof terrace

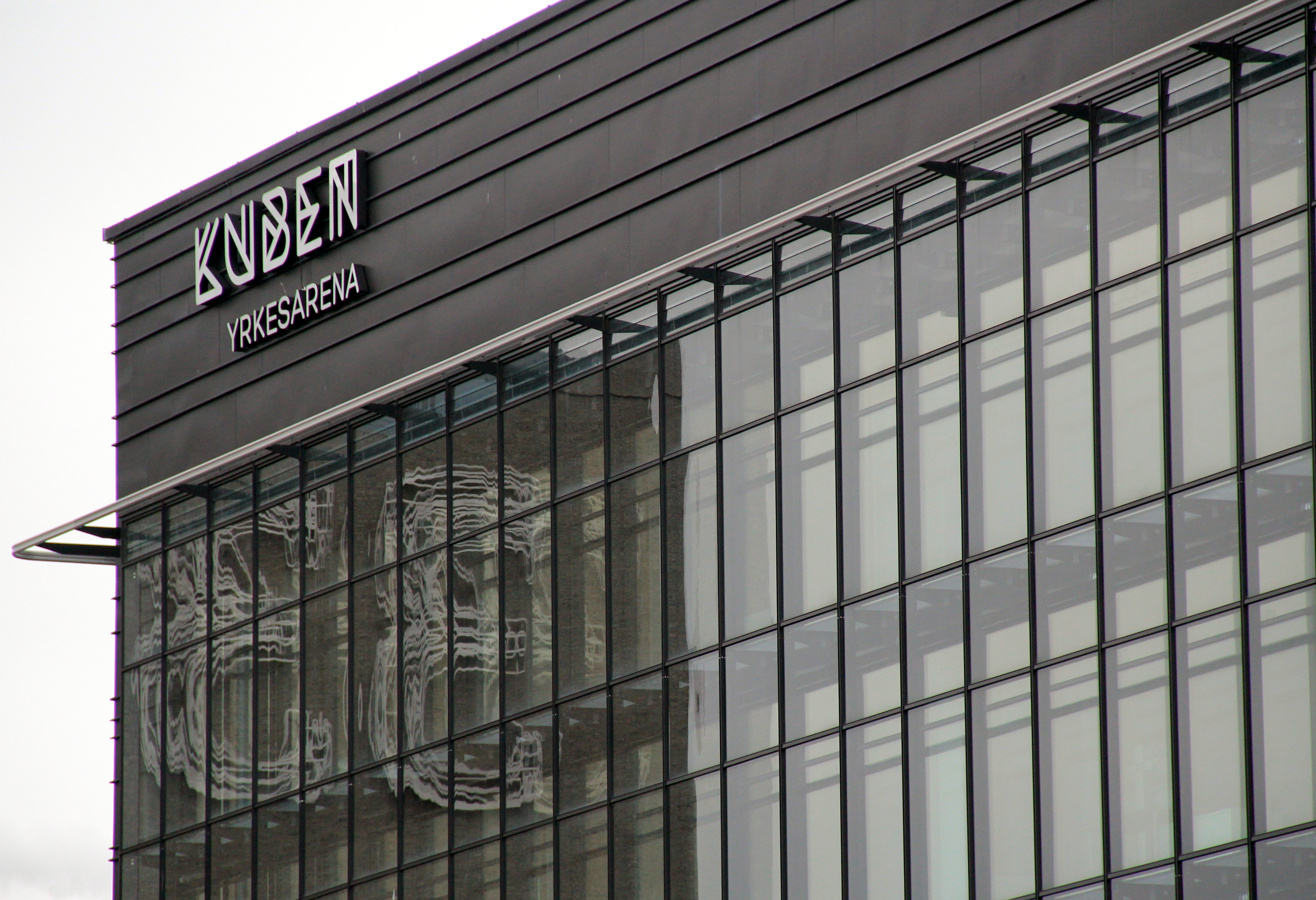
Kuben's north wall towards National Road 163

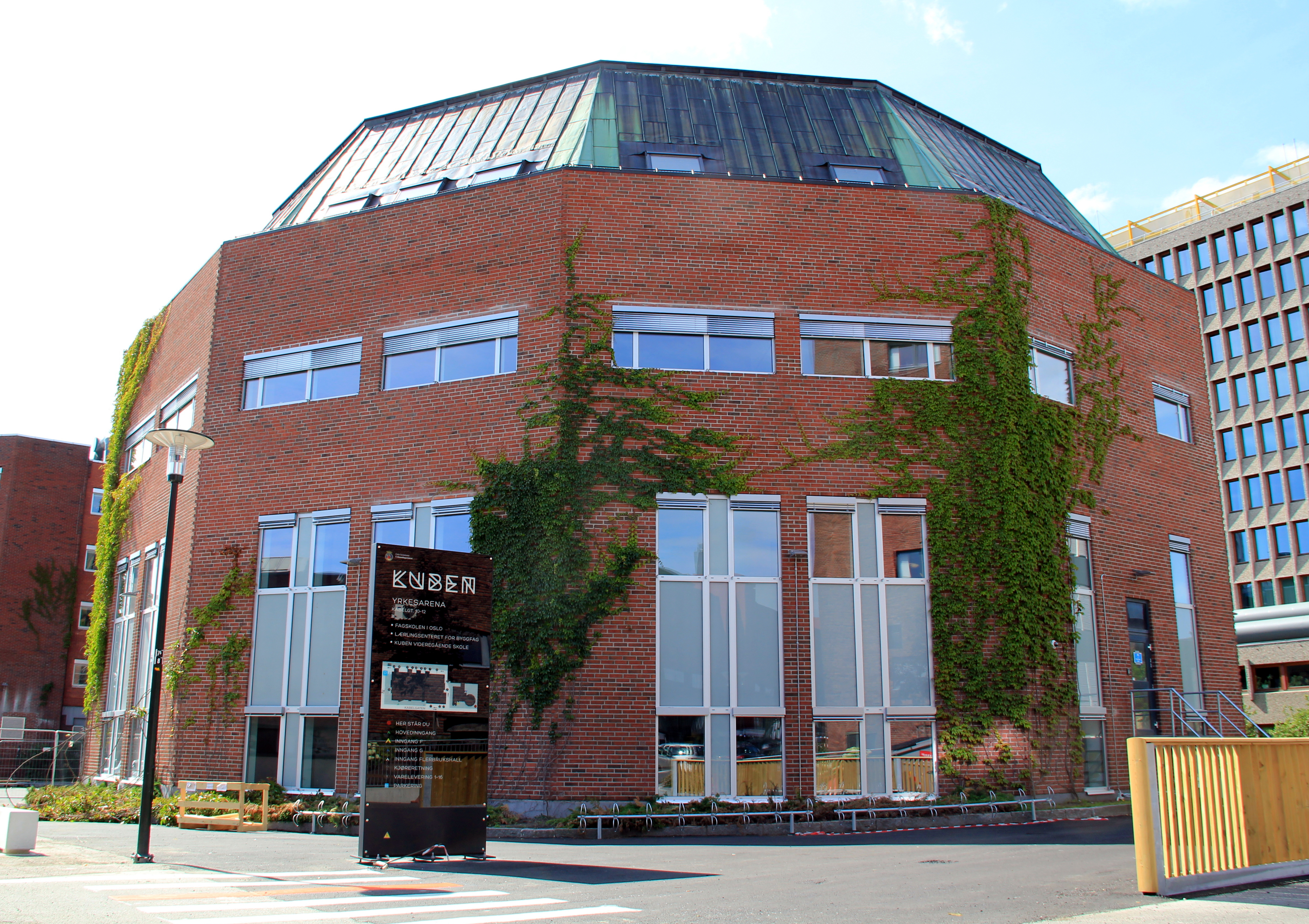
BiKuben in the neighbouring building in Kabelgaten 24

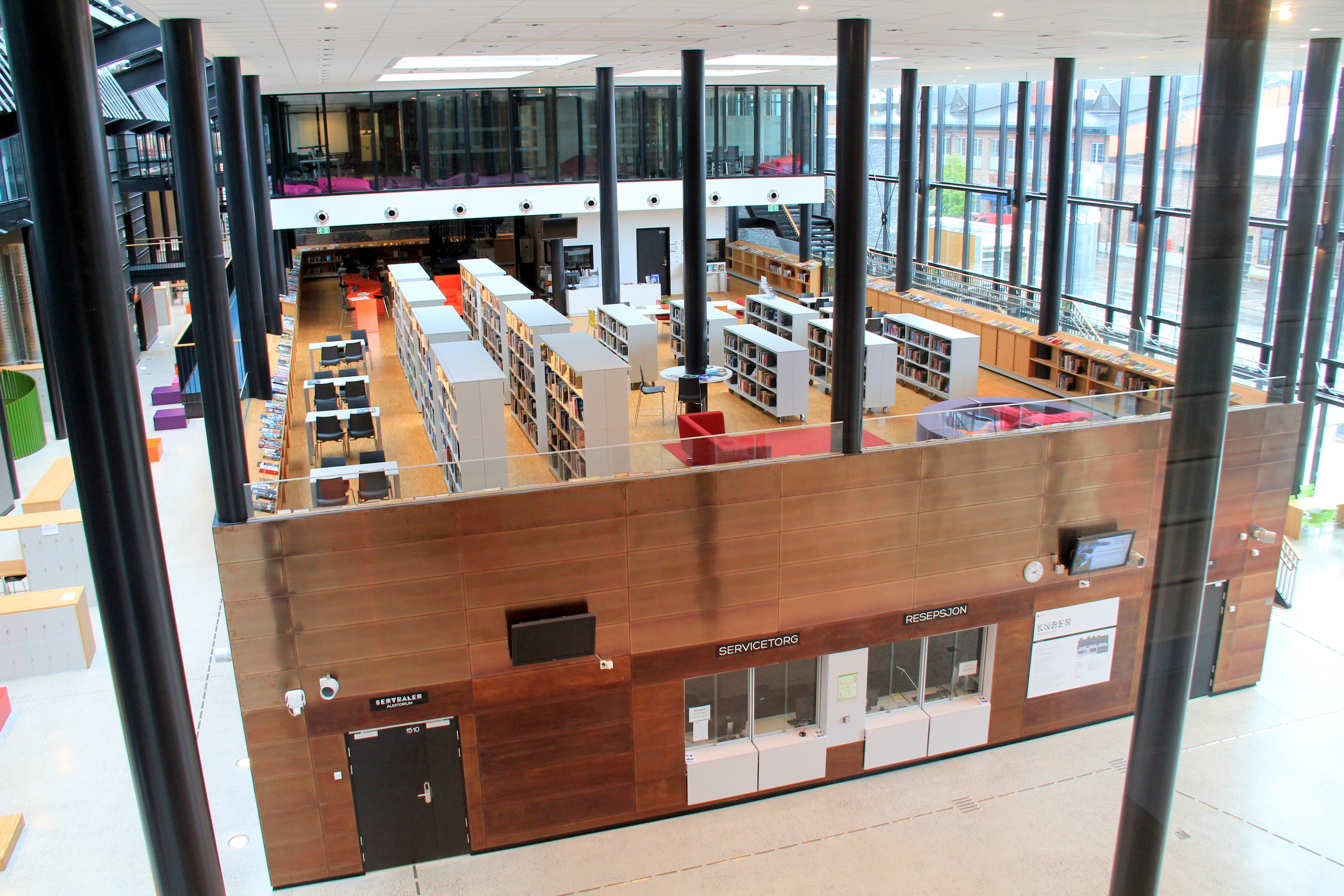
The School Library

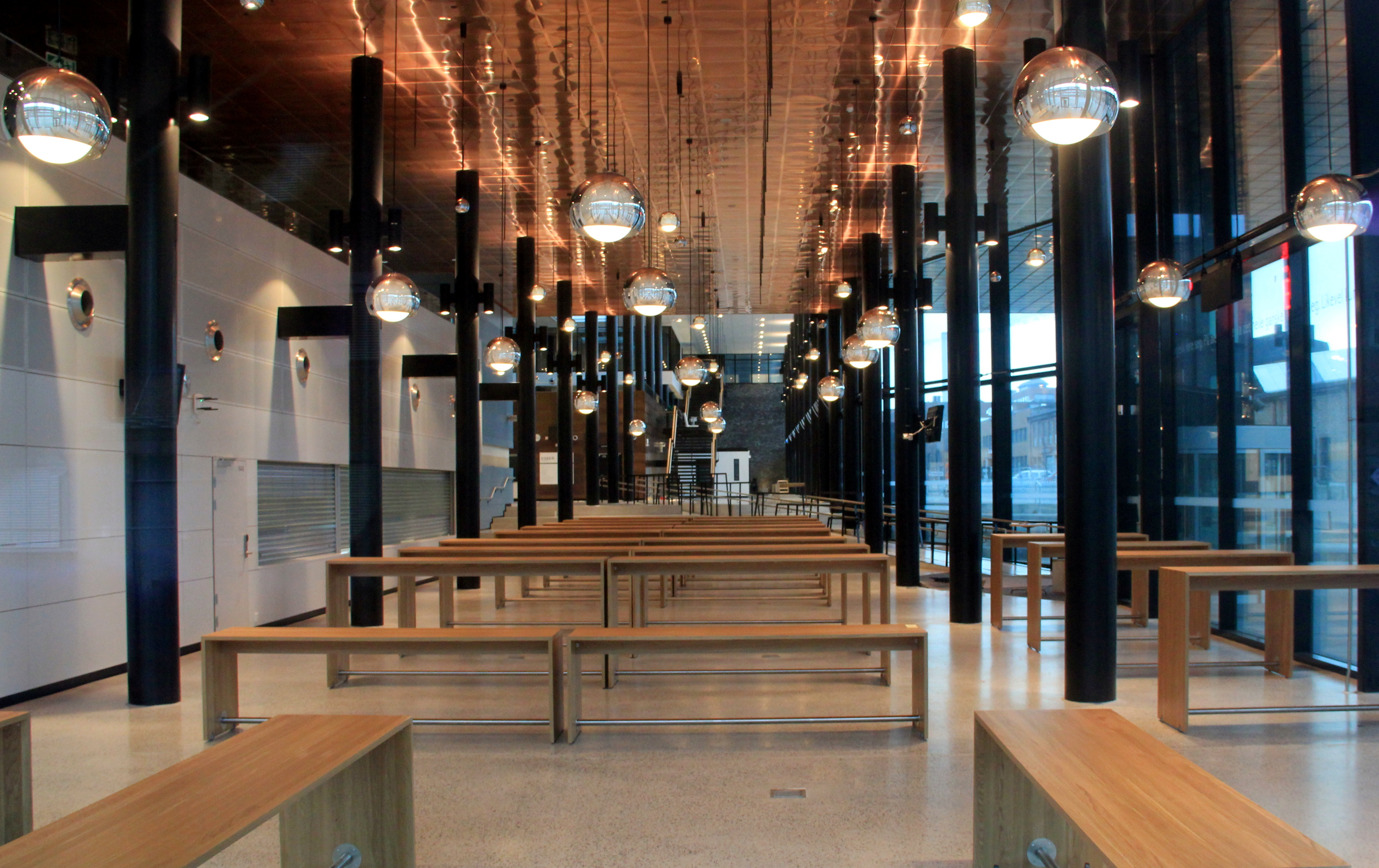
Foyer and canteen by the main entrance

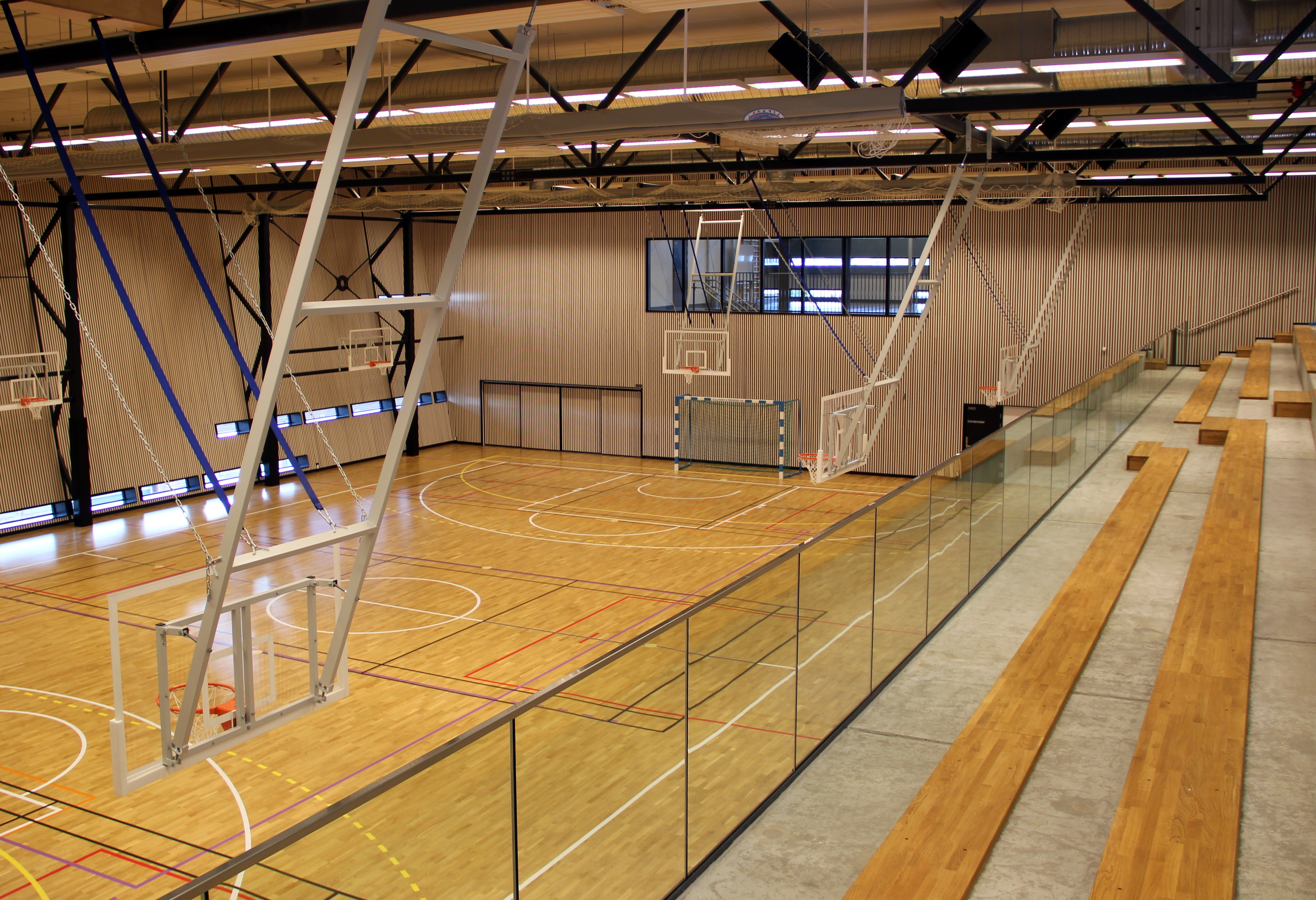
Kuben multi sport facilities

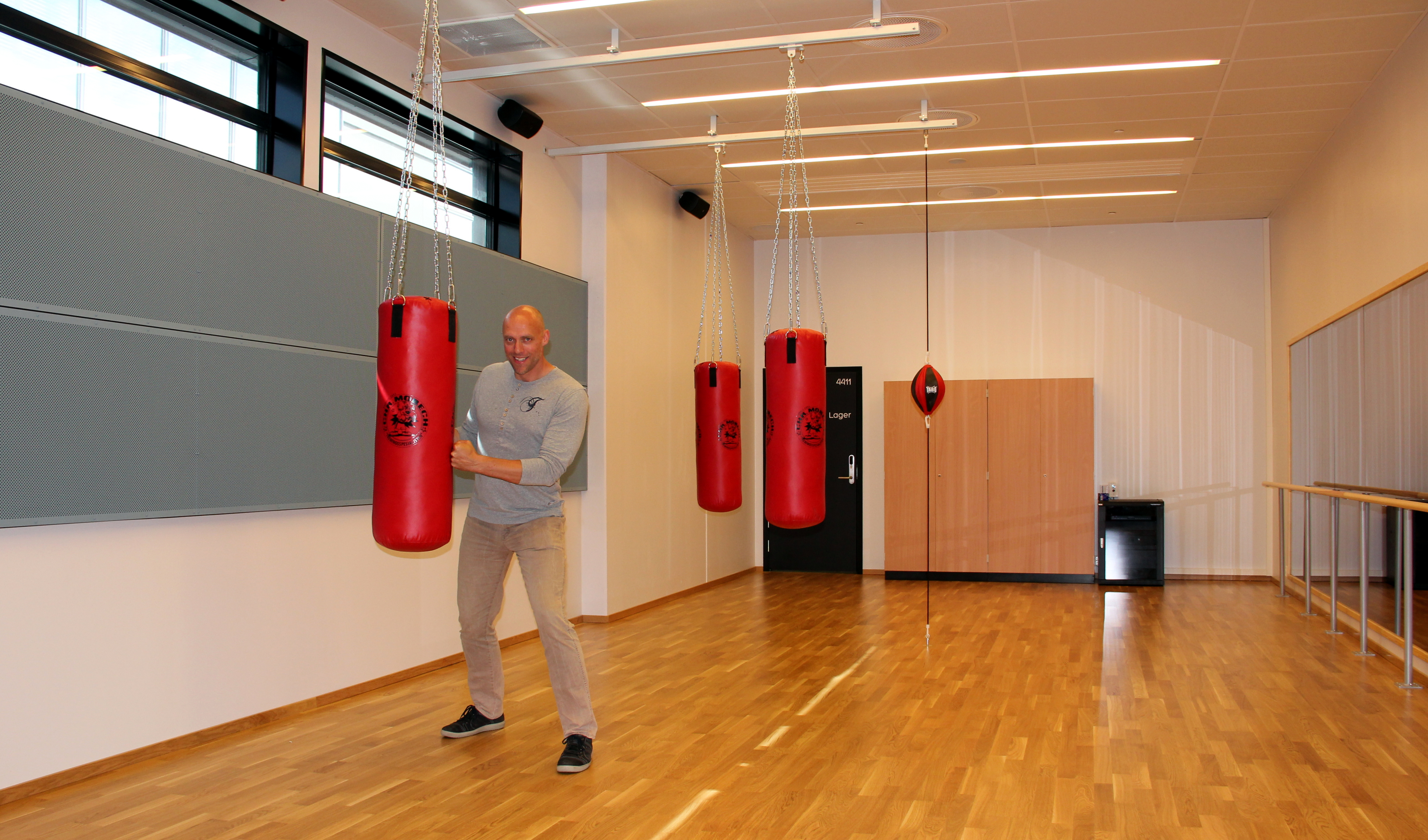
Kubens room for dance and martial arts

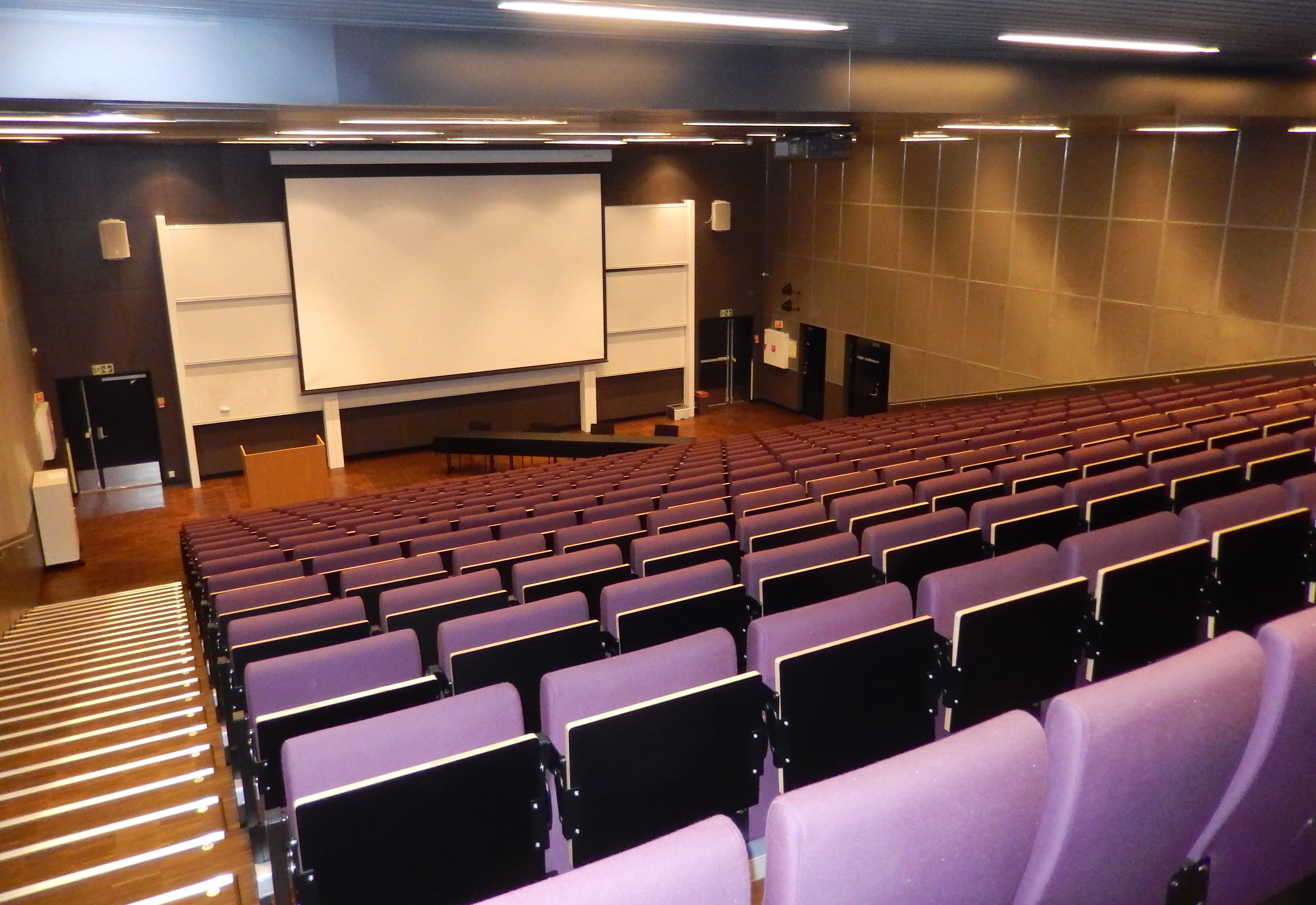
The schools auditorium, "The Sentral", for 300 persons
