= Norwegian National Road 163 =

Road in Norway

Coordinates: 59°56′30″N 10°51′45″E

National Road 163
- Bokmål: Riksvei 163; Nynorsk: Riksveg 163

Route information
- Length: 11 km (6.8 mi)

Location
- Country: Norway

Highway system
- Roads in Norway; National Roads; County Roads

Riksvei 163 (Rv163) runs between Skogskrysset in Lørenskog and Økern in Oslo. The road is 11 km, of which 1.2 km are in Akershus and 9.8 km in Oslo.

The road consists of Østre Aker vei (Oslo) and Lørenskogveien (Lørenskog). The road has four lanes until it meets the E6, but is not classed as a motorway.
