= Borettslag =

Borettslag is the legal entity for housing cooperatives in Norway. The company is owned by those who live in the cooperative, the partholders. Each part gives the right to live in the cooperative, and thus in a particular apartment or house. A partholder is free to sell their part, but the cooperative statute can give internal first refusal. The borettslag owns the buildings and ground the buildings are on. The highest authority in the cooperative is the annual general meeting Amongst other agenda items, the board of directors is elected at the annual general meeting. The board of directors is responsible for the daily operatives of the cooperative.

Usually a large share of the construction costs of the property is financed through common debt, that is issued to the cooperative, and not to the individuals. This debt, along with the costs to cover running the grounds, is charged to the owners as rent. Some cooperatives are members of a housing association, which again are members of the Norwegian Federation of Co-operative Housing Associations. Previously only housing associations could create cooperatives, but now this right is also granted to commercial developers, who often create smaller cooperatives.

== See also ==
- Mitchell-Lama Housing
