= Økern =

District in Oslo, Norway

Coordinates: 59°56′N 10°48′E

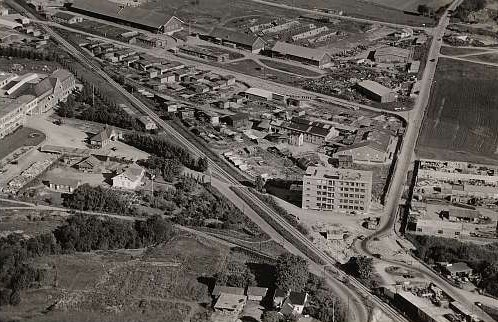
Overview in 1951

Økern was a farm in the former municipality of Aker, Norway, and is currently a district in the borough of Bjerke in the city of Oslo. It includes the neighborhoods of Refstad, Risløkka, Brobekk, Nordre Hovin, Aker Sykehus, Bjerkebanen, and Økern Senter.

== Infrastructure ==
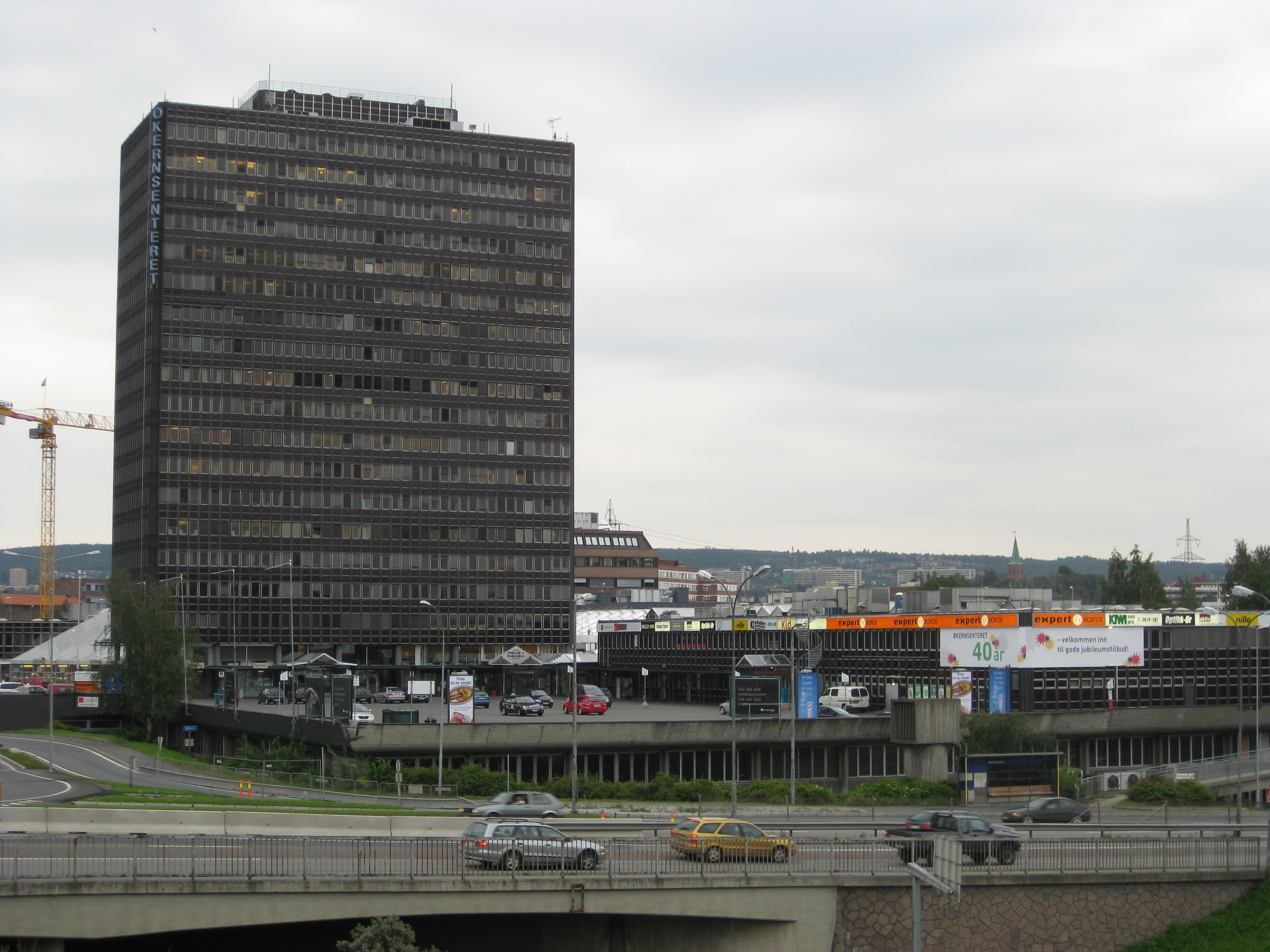
Økernsenteret houses a shopping mall and offices.

The district is served by the Grorud Line of the Oslo Metro. A larger business centre is located near the Økern Station. Among the institutions at Økern is the headquarters of the Norwegian State Educational Loan Fund. The Alna Line, used for freight trains between the Trunk Line and the Gjøvik Line, from Alnabru to Grefsen, passes through Økern, close to the business centre of Økernsenteret.

== History ==
The farm of Økern was among the oldest in the former municipality of Aker. The earliest preserved document where Økern is mentioned dates back to 1279. In the 13th century the farm was owned by landowner Audun Hugleiksson, and it later became a property of the Church. Among the owners from the 17th century onwards were Ulrik Frederik Gyldenløve (from 1679), Lauritz Jacobsssøn Falch, Paul Peterssøn Vogt, Ole Christopher Wessel, Peter Collett and Ludvig Mariboe (who lived at the farm until his death in 1841). Økernveien, an old road to the former city border, was named after the farm in 1879.

In the 19th century the farm was split off into several smaller units, and from 1910 onwards small residential houses were built in the northern part of Økern. Land owner Anton Tschudi parceled out both parts of the farm of Økern and other properties in Aker. The road Anton Tschudis vei at Økern was named after him in 1925.

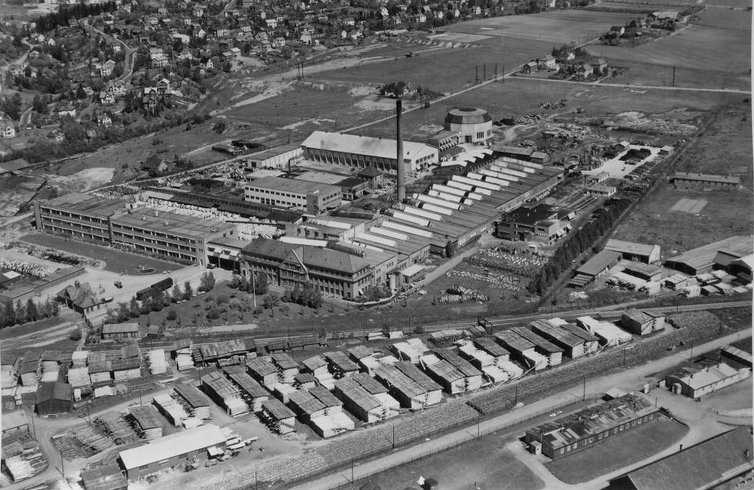
The Alna Line past the Standard Telephones and Cables (Norwegian: Standard Telefon og Kabelfabrik) at Økern in 1952

In 1915 the factory Skandinaviske Kabel- og Gummifabriker was established at Økern, and production started in 1919. The factory was eventually acquired by the ITT Corporation and renamed Standard Telephones and Cables from 1934. Cable manufacturing in Oslo was terminated in 1992.

The municipality of Oslo bought the rest of the farm in 1938. After World War II the property was further developed with apartments, business and industry. Central participants in the development of Økern in the 1950s were architect Gunnar Schultz and building contractor Nils Stian Stiansen. Økernbråten I had 385 apartments plus kindergarten, and Økernbråten II consisted of eleven blocks with 290 apartments; constructed between 1955 and 1959. In Brobekkveien a nine-floor block with shops, offices and apartments was finished in 1957. The housing cooperative of Kroklia Borettslag, ten terraced houses with a total of forty apartments, was completed in 1960.

In 2021 Kloden, a theatre for children and youth, opened.
