= Kuben Vocational Arena =

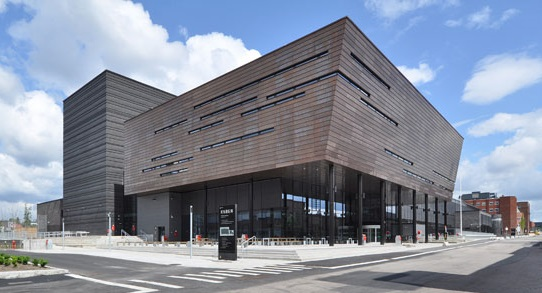
Kuben Vocational Arena

Kuben Vocational Arena is a centre for Vocational Education and Training placed at Økern in Oslo, Norway. The arena contains Kuben Upper Secondary School (Norwegian: Kuben videregående skole) with 1400 students, Oslo Technical School (Fagskolen i Oslo) with 550 adult students. In addition, the apprenticeship within Building and construction trade will be coursed at the arena.
