= 1971 European Athletics Championships – Men's shot put =

Men's shot put at the European Athletics Championships

The men's shot put at the 1971 European Athletics Championships was held in Helsinki, Finland, at Helsinki Olympic Stadium on 12 and 13 August 1971.

== Medalists ==
Gold	Hartmut Briesenick; East Germany
Silver	Heinz-Joachim Rothenburg; East Germany
Bronze	Władysław Komar; Poland

== Results ==
=== Final ===
13 August

Rank	Name	Nationality	Result	Notes
1st place, gold medalist(s)	Hartmut Briesenick	East Germany	21.08	AR
2nd place, silver medalist(s)	Heinz-Joachim Rothenburg	East Germany	20.47	
3rd place, bronze medalist(s)	Władysław Komar	Poland	20.04	
4	Vilmos Varjú	Hungary	19.99	
5	Valeriy Voykin	Soviet Union	19.81	
6	Rimantas Plungė	Soviet Union	19.61	
7	Dieter Hoffmann	East Germany	19.38	
8	Yves Brouzet	France	19.20	
9	Pekka Ahnger	Finland	19.00	
10	Miroslav Janoušek	Czechoslovakia	18.76	
11	Ralf Reichenbach	West Germany	18.74	
12	Hans-Dieter Möser	West Germany	18.51	
13	Arnjolt Beer	France	18.46	
14	Seppo Simola	Finland	18.27	
	Heinfried Birlenbach	West Germany	DNS	

=== Qualification ===
12 August

Rank	Name	Nationality	Result	Notes
1	Władysław Komar	Poland	19.65	Q
2	Vilmos Varjú	Hungary	19.56	Q
3	Hartmut Briesenick	East Germany	19.55	Q
4	Rimantas Plungė	Soviet Union	19.19	Q
5	Pekka Ahnger	Finland	19.14	Q
6	Valeriy Voykin	Soviet Union	19.00	Q
7	Miroslav Janoušek	Czechoslovakia	19.00	Q
8	Yves Brouzet	France	18.96	Q
9	Ralf Reichenbach	West Germany	18.91	Q
10	Heinfried Birlenbach	West Germany	18.89	Q
11	Seppo Simola	Finland	18.83	Q
12	Heinz-Joachim Rothenburg	East Germany	18.81	Q
13	Dieter Hoffmann	East Germany	18.75	Q
14	Arnjolt Beer	France	18.75	Q
15	Hans-Dieter Möser	West Germany	18.72	Q
16	Geoff Capes	Great Britain	18.54	
17	Jaroslav Brabec	Czechoslovakia	18.50	
18	Matti Yrjölä	Finland	18.49	
19	Ivan Ivančić	Yugoslavia	18.43	
20	Anders Arrhenius	Sweden	17.84	
21	Bjørn Bang Andersen	Norway	17.83	
22	Mihály Teveli	Hungary	16.82	
23	Sándor Holub	Hungary	16.63	

== Participation ==
According to an unofficial count, 23 athletes from 12 countries participated in the event.

- Czechoslovakia (2)
- East Germany (3)
- Finland (3)
- France (2)
- Hungary (3)
- Norway (1)
- Poland (1)
- Soviet Union (2)
- Sweden (1)
- Great Britain (1)
- West Germany (3)
- Yugoslavia (1)
