= 1969 European Athletics Championships – Men's shot put =

Men's shot put at the European Athletics Championships

The men's shot put at the 1969 European Athletics Championships was held in Athens, Greece, at Georgios Karaiskakis Stadium on 17 and 18 September 1969.

== Medalists ==
Gold	Dieter Hoffmann; East Germany
Silver	Heinz-Joachim Rothenburg; East Germany
Bronze	Hans-Peter Gies; East Germany

== Results ==
=== Final ===
18 September

Rank	Name	Nationality	Result	Notes
1st place, gold medalist(s)	Dieter Hoffmann	East Germany	20.12	CR
2nd place, silver medalist(s)	Heinz-Joachim Rothenburg	East Germany	20.05	
3rd place, bronze medalist(s)	Hans-Peter Gies	East Germany	19.78	
4	Matti Yrjölä	Finland	19.27	
5	Pierre Colnard	France	19.06	
6	Eduard Gushchin	Soviet Union	18.91	
7	Vilmos Varjú	Hungary	18.78	
8	Nikolay Karasyov	Soviet Union	18.71	
9	Miroslav Janoušek	Czechoslovakia	18.67	
10	Edy Hubacher	Switzerland	18.67	
11	Seppo Simola	Finland	18.65	
12	Yves Brouzet	France	18.42	

=== Qualification ===
17 September

Rank	Name	Nationality	Result	Notes
1	Dieter Hoffmann	East Germany	19.72	CR Q
2	Hans-Peter Gies	East Germany	19.51	Q
3	Heinz-Joachim Rothenburg	East Germany	19.51	Q
4	Matti Yrjölä	Finland	19.18	Q
5	Pierre Colnard	France	18.96	Q
6	Nikolay Karasyov	Soviet Union	18.83	Q
7	Eduard Gushchin	Soviet Union	18.80	Q
8	Vilmos Varjú	Hungary	18.62	Q
9	Yves Brouzet	France	18.54	Q
10	Edy Hubacher	Switzerland	18.48	Q
11	Miroslav Janoušek	Czechoslovakia	18.47	Q
12	Seppo Simola	Finland	18.41	Q
13	Flavio Asta	Italy	18.34	
14	Ricky Bruch	Sweden	18.34	
15	Bengt Bendeus	Sweden	18.21	
16	Sándor Holub	Hungary	17.92	
17	Arnjolt Beer	France	17.78	
18	Jeff Teale	Great Britain	17.77	
19	Thord Carlsson	Sweden	17.76	
20	Hannes Schulze-Bauer	Austria	17.42	
21	Georgios Lemonis	Greece	17.38	
22	Guðmundur Hermansson	Iceland	17.16	

== Participation ==
According to an unofficial count, 22 athletes from 13 countries participated in the event.

- Austria (1)
- Czechoslovakia (1)
- East Germany (3)
- Finland (2)
- France (3)
- Greece (1)
- Hungary (2)
- Iceland (1)
- Italy (1)
- Soviet Union (2)
- Sweden (3)
- Switzerland (1)
- Great Britain (1)
