= 1968 European Indoor Games – Men's shot put =

The men's shot put event at the 1968 European Indoor Games was held on 9 March in Madrid.

== Results ==
Rank	Name	Nationality	#1	#2	#3	#4	#5	#6	Result	Notes
1st place, gold medalist(s)	Heinfried Birlenbach	West Germany	x	17.78	18.45	18.19	x	18.65	18.65	
2nd place, silver medalist(s)	Władysław Komar	Poland	x	x	18.40	17.94	x	x	18.40	
3rd place, bronze medalist(s)	Nikolay Karasyov	Soviet Union	17.90	x	18.35	17.56	18.34	18.32	18.35	
4	Traugott Glöckler	West Germany	18.14	18.33	17.87	x	17.67	x	18.33	
5	Edy Hubacher	Switzerland	18.09	16.86	x	x	x	18.33	18.33	
6	Arnjolt Beer	France	18.03	x	17.36	18.12	x	17.98	18.12	
7	Pierre Colnard	France	18.02	x	18.01				18.02	
8	Eduard Gushchin	Soviet Union	17.94	18.00	17.86				18.00	
9	Bjørn Bang Andersen	Norway	17.27	17.88	17.90				17.90	
10	Tomo Šuker	Yugoslavia	17.74	x	17.50				17.74	
11	Thord Carlsson	Sweden	17.20	17.19	17.17				17.20	
