= 1966 European Athletics Championships – Men's shot put =

Men's shot put at the European Athletics Championships

The men's shot put at the 1966 European Athletics Championships was held in Budapest, Hungary, at Népstadion on 2 and 3 September 1966.

== Medalists ==
Gold	Vilmos Varjú; Hungary
Silver	Nikolay Karasyov; Soviet Union
Bronze	Władysław Komar; Poland

== Results ==
=== Final ===
3 September

Rank	Name	Nationality	Result	Notes
1st place, gold medalist(s)	Vilmos Varjú	Hungary	19.43	CR
2nd place, silver medalist(s)	Nikolay Karasyov	Soviet Union	18.82	
3rd place, bronze medalist(s)	Władysław Komar	Poland	18.68	
4	Alfred Sosgórnik	Poland	18.38	
5	Heinfried Birlenbach	West Germany	18.37	
6	Matti Yrjölä	Finland	18.19	
7	Pierre Colnard	France	18.15	NR
8	Dieter Hoffmann	East Germany	18.02	
9	Bjørn Bang Andersen	Norway	17.84	
10	Tomislav Šuker	Yugoslavia	17.74	
11	Pero Barišić	Yugoslavia	17.66	
12	Eduard Gushchin	Soviet Union	17.64	

=== Qualification ===
2 September

Rank	Name	Nationality	Result	Notes
1	Vilmos Varjú	Hungary	19.05	CR Q
2	Heinfried Birlenbach	West Germany	18.59	Q
3	Władysław Komar	Poland	18.53	Q
4	Nikolay Karasyov	Soviet Union	18.38	Q
5	Eduard Gushchin	Soviet Union	18.23	Q
6	Tomislav Šuker	Yugoslavia	18.01	Q
7	Bjørn Bang Andersen	Norway	18.01	Q
8	Alfred Sosgórnik	Poland	18.01	Q
9	Matti Yrjölä	Finland	17.90	Q
10	Pierre Colnard	France	17.75	Q
11	Pero Barišić	Yugoslavia	17.69	Q
12	Dieter Hoffmann	East Germany	17.62	Q
13	Milija Jocović	Yugoslavia	17.61	
14	Géza Fejér	Hungary	17.57	
15	Bengt Bendeus	Sweden	17.40	
16	Alain Drufin	France	16.91	

== Participation ==
According to an unofficial count, 16 athletes from 10 countries participated in the event.

- East Germany (1)
- Finland (1)
- France (2)
- Hungary (2)
- Norway (1)
- Poland (2)
- Soviet Union (2)
- Sweden (1)
- West Germany (1)
- Yugoslavia (3)
