= 1978 European Athletics Championships – Men's shot put =

Men's shot put at the European Athletics Championships

The men's shot put at the 1978 European Athletics Championships was held in Prague, then Czechoslovakia, at Stadion Evžena Rošického on 31 August and 1 September 1978.

== Medalists ==
Gold	Udo Beyer; East Germany
Silver	Aleksandr Baryshnikov; Soviet Union
Bronze	Wolfgang Schmidt; East Germany

== Results ==
=== Final ===
1 September

Rank	Name	Nationality	Result	Notes
1st place, gold medalist(s)	Udo Beyer	East Germany	21.08	CR
2nd place, silver medalist(s)	Aleksandr Baryshnikov	Soviet Union	20.68	
3rd place, bronze medalist(s)	Wolfgang Schmidt	East Germany	20.30	
4	Reijo Ståhlberg	Finland	20.17	
5	Anatoliy Yarosh	Soviet Union	20.03	
6	Jaromír Vlk	Czechoslovakia	19.53	
7	Hreinn Halldórsson	Iceland	19.34	
8	Jaroslav Brabec	Czechoslovakia	19.27	
9	Valcho Stoev	Bulgaria	19.23	
10	Mathias Schmidt	East Germany	19.21	
	Geoff Capes	Great Britain	DQ^{‡}	
	Yevgeniy Mironov	Soviet Union	DQ^{†}	Doping

^{†} Yevgeniy Mironov initially won the silver medal with 20.87m, but he was disqualified for drug use.
^{‡}: Geoff Capes was not permitted to start in the final after he was disqualified for "disorderly conduct" for pushing an official during an argument.

=== Qualification ===
31 August

Rank	Name	Nationality	Result	Notes
1	Reijo Ståhlberg	Finland	20.25	Q
2	Udo Beyer	East Germany	20.03	Q
3	Anatoliy Yarosh	Soviet Union	19.80	Q
4	Jaromír Vlk	Czechoslovakia	19.76	Q
5	Aleksandr Baryshnikov	Soviet Union	19.74	Q
6	Wolfgang Schmidt	East Germany	19.72	Q
7	Hreinn Halldórsson	Iceland	19.62	Q
8	Jaroslav Brabec	Czechoslovakia	19.48	Q
9	Mathias Schmidt	East Germany	19.38	Q
10	Valcho Stoev	Bulgaria	19.26	Q
11	Ralf Reichenbach	West Germany	19.09	
12	Jean-Pierre Egger	Switzerland	18.67	
13	Miroslav Janoušek	Czechoslovakia	18.61	
14	Anders Arrhenius	Sweden	18.48	
15	Vladimir Milić	Yugoslavia	18.35	
16	Marco Montelatici	Italy	18.14	
17	Angelo Groppelli	Italy	18.04	
	Yevgeniy Mironov	Soviet Union	DQ	Q^{†}
	Geoff Capes	Great Britain	DQ	Q^{‡}

^{†}: Yevgeniy Mironov initially reached the final, but he was disqualified for drug use.
^{‡}: Geoff Capes initially reached the final, but he was disqualified for "disorderly conduct" after pushing an official during an argument.

== Participation ==
According to an unofficial count, 19 athletes from 12 countries participated in the event.

- Bulgaria (1)
- Czechoslovakia (3)
- East Germany (3)
- Finland (1)
- Iceland (1)
- Italy (2)
- Soviet Union (3)
- Sweden (1)
- Switzerland (1)
- Great Britain (1)
- West Germany (1)
- Yugoslavia (1)
