= 1966 European Indoor Games – Men's shot put =

The men's shot put event at the 1966 European Indoor Games was held on 27 March in Dortmund.

== Medalists ==
Gold	Silver	Bronze
Vilmos Varjú; Hungary	Dieter Hoffmann; East Germany	Jiří Skobla; Czechoslovakia

== Results ==
=== Qualification ===
Rank	Name	Nationality	#1	#2	#3	Result	Notes
1	Vilmos Varjú	Hungary	18.17	–	–	18.17	q
2	Dieter Hoffmann	East Germany	17.34	17.81	–	17.81	q
3	Jaroslav Šmíd	Czechoslovakia	x	17.66	x	17.66	q
4	Jiří Skobla	Czechoslovakia	16.96	16.70	17.37	17.37	q
5	Bengt Christiansson	Sweden	17.09	16.80	17.34	17.34	q
6	Tomislav Šuker	Yugoslavia	15.93	16.90	16.38	16.90	q
7	Bjørn Bang Andersen	Norway	x	16.02	16.72	16.72	
8	Pierre Colnard	France	16.62	16.26	16.08	16.62	
9	Heinfried Birlenbach	West Germany	x	16.37	16.55	16.55	
10	Pero Barišić	Yugoslavia	16.44	x	15.95	16.44	
11	Loukas Louka	Greece	16.23	15.76	15.81	16.23	
12	Alberto Díaz de la Gandara	Spain	15.58	15.53	15.59	15.59	
13	Roland Borrey	Belgium	x	15.27	15.23	15.27	
14	Edy Hubacher	Switzerland	14.61	15.20	15.15	15.20	

=== Final ===
Rank	Name	Nationality	#1	#2	#3	#4	#5	#6	Result	Notes
1st place, gold medalist(s)	Vilmos Varjú	Hungary	18.43	18.72	x	19.05	18.75	18.68	19.05	
2nd place, silver medalist(s)	Dieter Hoffmann	East Germany	18.14	x	x	x	18.25	x	18.25	
3rd place, bronze medalist(s)	Jiří Skobla	Czechoslovakia	17.36	18.08	x	x	x	x	18.08	
4	Tomislav Šuker	Yugoslavia	16.86	17.40	17.46	17.21	17.72	17.88	17.88	
5	Jaroslav Šmíd	Czechoslovakia	16.66	17.32	x	x	17.71	16.92	17.71	
6	Bengt Christiansson	Sweden	x	17.17	17.23	17.09	x	x	17.23	
