= 1967 European Indoor Games – Men's shot put =

Men's shot put event held during the 1967 European Indoor Games

The men's shot put event at the 1967 European Indoor Games was held on 11 and 12 March in Prague.

== Medalists ==
Gold	Silver	Bronze
Nikolay Karasyov; Soviet Union	Eduard Gushchin; Soviet Union	Władysław Komar; Poland

== Results ==
=== Qualification ===
Rank	Name	Nationality	#1	#2	#3	Result	Notes
1	Eduard Gushchin	Soviet Union	18.10	18.81	–	18.81	q
2	Pierre Colnard	France	17.21	18.27	–	18.27	q
3	Władysław Komar	Poland	18.26	x	–	18.26	q
4	Nikolay Karasyov	Soviet Union	17.44	17.88	18.08	18.08	q
5	Milija Jocović	Yugoslavia	17.60	17.42	x	17.60	q
6	Tomislav Šuker	Yugoslavia	17.36	16.90	17.36	17.36	q
7	Jiří Skobla	Czechoslovakia	16.68	17.13	17.30	17.30	
8	Miroslav Janoušek	Czechoslovakia	x	17.26	x	17.26	
9	Heinfried Birlenbach	West Germany	x	16.63	17.13	17.13	
10	Antero Juntto	Finland	x	16.49	x	16.49	
11	Bertrand De Decker	Belgium	14.95	14.55	14.34	14.95	

=== Final ===
Rank	Name	Nationality	#1	#2	#3	#4	#5	#6	Result	Notes
1st place, gold medalist(s)	Nikolay Karasyov	Soviet Union	19.14	19.26	x	x	18.54	18.40	19.26	
2nd place, silver medalist(s)	Eduard Gushchin	Soviet Union	18.76	18.25	x	18.70	18.94	18.96	18.96	
3rd place, bronze medalist(s)	Władysław Komar	Poland	x	18.85	x	18.35	x	x	18.85	
4	Pierre Colnard	France	17.56	17.56	x	x	x	17.75	17.75	
5	Milija Jocović	Yugoslavia	16.90	17.21	17.69	17.72	17.68	17.57	17.72	
6	Tomislav Šuker	Yugoslavia	17.38	x	x	x	x	16.87	17.38	
