= 1971 European Athletics Indoor Championships – Men's shot put =

The men's shot put event at the 1971 European Athletics Indoor Championships was held on 14 March in Sofia.

== Results ==
Rank	Name	Nationality	#1	#2	#3	#4	#5	#6	Result	Notes
1st place, gold medalist(s)	Hartmut Briesenick	East Germany	19.30	19.19	19.97	20.12	20.19	x	20.19	
2nd place, silver medalist(s)	Valeriy Voykin	Soviet Union	19.48	19.00	19.30	19.54	19.29	19.06	19.54	
3rd place, bronze medalist(s)	Ricky Bruch	Sweden	19.50	x	19.12	x	x	x	19.50	
4	Władysław Komar	Poland	19.43	18.92	x	x	x	x	19.43	
5	Heinz-Joachim Rothenburg	East Germany	18.87	18.86	19.19	x	19.10	19.32	19.32	
6	Ralf Reichenbach	West Germany	18.65	17.98	x	18.17	18.48	x	18.65	
7	Pierre Colnard	France	18.57	16.80	x	x	x	x	18.57	
8	Seppo Simola	Finland	17.69	17.83	18.19	18.00	17.92	17.98	18.19	
9	Tadeusz Sadza	Poland	17.60	18.01	18.13				18.13	
10	Geoff Capes	Great Britain	17.58	x	17.84				17.84	
11	Jaroslav Brabec	Czechoslovakia	17.52	17.82	x				17.82	
12	Valcho Stoev	Bulgaria	17.80	17.73	x				17.80	
13	Arnjolt Beer	France	16.60	17.00	17.24				17.24	
14	Yves Brouzet	France	x	17.12	x				17.12	
15	Adrian Gagea	Romania	x	16.60	x				16.60	
