= 1973 European Athletics Indoor Championships – Men's shot put =

The men's shot put event at the 1973 European Athletics Indoor Championships was held on 11 March in Rotterdam.

== Results ==
Rank	Name	Nationality	Result	Notes
1st place, gold medalist(s)	Jaroslav Brabec	Czechoslovakia	20.29	NR
2nd place, silver medalist(s)	Gerd Lochmann	East Germany	20.12	
3rd place, bronze medalist(s)	Jaromír Vlk	Czechoslovakia	19.68	
4	Rimantas Plungė	Soviet Union	19.48	
5	Ricky Bruch	Sweden	19.29	
6	Valcho Stoev	Bulgaria	19.29	
7	Geoff Capes	Great Britain	19.26	
8	Ferdinand Schladen	West Germany	19.05	
9	Mike Winch	Great Britain	18.52	
10	Matti Yrjölä	Finland	18.03	
11	Anatoliy Yarosh	Soviet Union	17.78	
12	Gerd Steines	West Germany	17.69	
