= Athletics at the 1965 Summer Universiade – Men's shot put =

The men's shot put event at the 1965 Summer Universiade was held at the People's Stadium in Budapest on 26 August 1965.

The winning margin was 1.63 metres which as of 2024 remains the only time the men's shot put was won by more than 1.1 metres at these games.

== Medalists ==
Gold	Silver	Bronze
Randy Matson; United States	Nikolay Karasyov; Soviet Union	Eduard Gushchin; Soviet Union

== Results ==
=== Qualification ===
Rank	Group	Name	Nationality	Result	Notes
1	?	Randy Matson	United States	18.38	Q
2	?	Zsigmond Nagy	Hungary	17.15	Q
3	?	Werner Heger	West Germany	16.81	Q
4	?	Géza Fejér	Hungary	16.77	Q
5	?	Loukas Louka	Greece	16.56	Q
6	?	John McGrath	United States	16.46	Q
7	?	Jacek Majchrowski	Poland	16.25	Q
8	?	Nikolay Karasyov	Soviet Union	16.23	Q
9	?	Traugott Glöckler	West Germany	15.67	Q
10	?	Eduard Gushchin	Soviet Union	15.55	Q
11	?	Alan Carter	Great Britain	15.53	Q
12	?	Adrian Gagea	Romania	15.50	Q
13	?	Boško Tomasović	Yugoslavia	15.46	Q
13	?	Gabriel Kladek	Czechoslovakia	15.46	Q
15	?	Heimo Reinitzer	Austria	15.25	Q
16	?	Alberto Díaz de la Gándara	Spain	15.21	Q
17	?	Henryk Wieprzycki	Poland	15.09	Q
18	?	Hans Schulze-Bauer	Austria	15.05	Q
19	?	Andrea Balleggi	Italy	14.80	
20	?	Shigenobu Murofushi	Japan	13.53	

=== Final ===
Rank	Name	Nationality	Result	Notes
1st place, gold medalist(s)	Randy Matson	United States	20.31	
2nd place, silver medalist(s)	Nikolay Karasyov	Soviet Union	18.68	
3rd place, bronze medalist(s)	Eduard Gushchin	Soviet Union	18.45	
4	Zsigmond Nagy	Hungary	18.12	
5	John McGrath	United States	18.01	
6	Boško Tomasović	Yugoslavia	17.47	
7	Werner Heger	West Germany	17.18	
8	Géza Fejér	Hungary	17.05	
9	Alan Carter	Great Britain	16.35	
10	Jacek Majchrowski	Poland	16.32	
11	Traugott Glöckler	West Germany	16.31	
12	Loukas Louka	Greece	16.28	
13	Alberto Díaz de la Gándara	Spain	15.95	
14	Hans Schulze-Bauer	Austria	15.73	
15	Heimo Reinitzer	Austria	15.46	
16	Adrian Gagea	Romania	15.40	
17	Henryk Wieprzycki	Poland	15.35	
18	Gabriel Kladek	Czechoslovakia	15.33	
