= Jaroslav Brabec =

Czechoslovak shot-putter and athlete coach

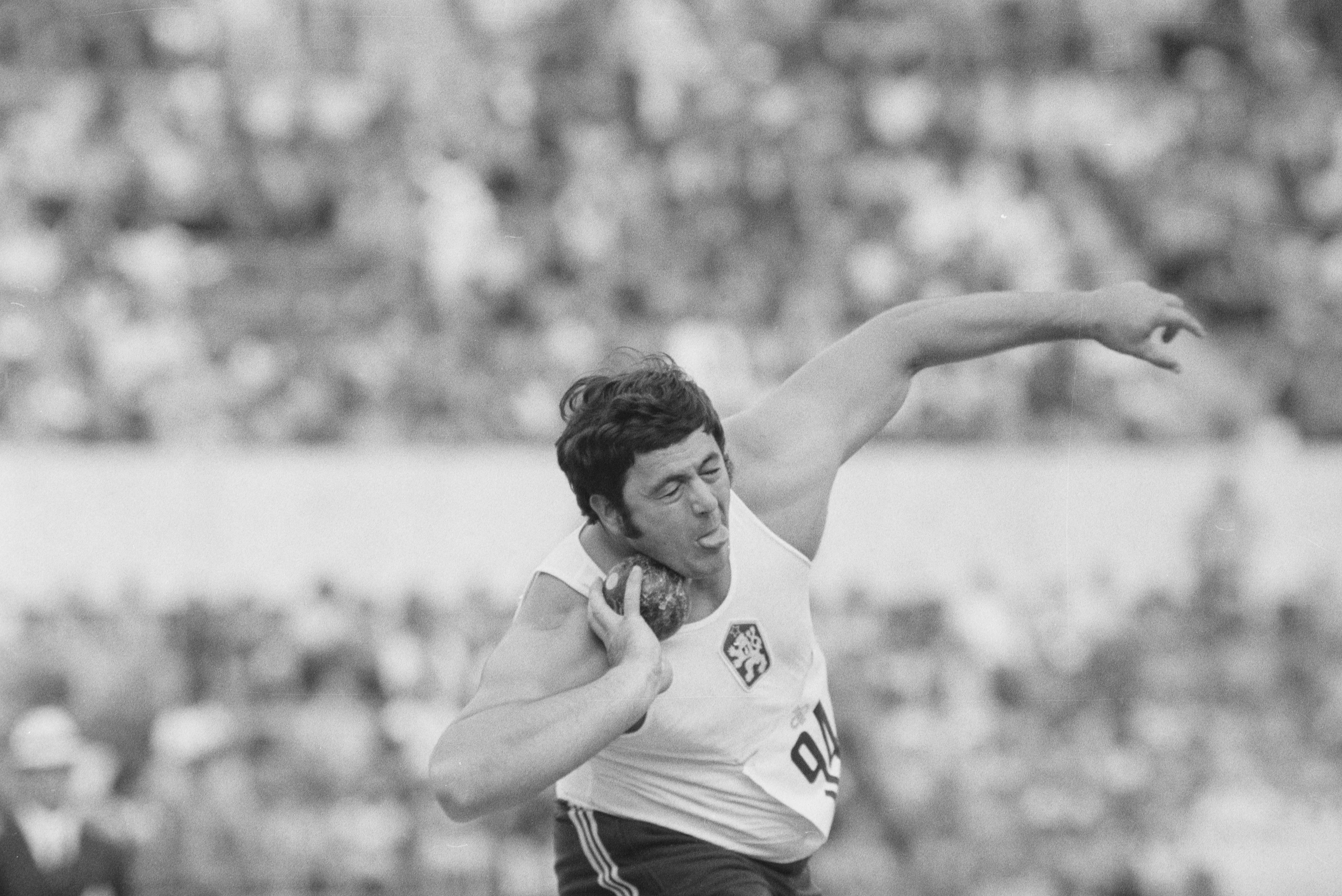
- Brabec in 1974

Personal information
- Born: 27 July 1949 Litoměřice, Czechoslovakia
- Died: 20 May 2018 (aged 68)

Sport
- Country: Czechoslovakia
- Sport: Shot put
Medal record
Men's athletics
Representing Czechoslovakia
European Indoor Championships
Gold medal – first place	1973 Rotterdam	Shot put
Bronze medal – third place	1972 Grenoble	Shot put
Bronze medal – third place	1974 Gothenburg	Shot put

Jaroslav Brabec (27 July 1949 – 20 May 2018) was a Czech track and field athlete who competed in the shot put. He twice represented Czechoslovakia at the Summer Olympics (1972 and 1976). He was a three-time participant at the European Athletics Championships (1971, 1974 and 1978) and a three-time medallist at the European Athletics Indoor Championships, being the champion at the 1973 edition.

Brabec had a personal best of 21.04 m (69 ft 1/4 in) in 1973. He was a 13-time national champion for Czechoslovakia, eight times outdoors and five indoors.

== Career ==
Brabec was born in Litoměřice, then in Czechoslovakia, and later moved to Prague, where he joined the Dukla Prague athletics club and began competing in shot put competitions. He grew to a height of 1.90 m (6 ft 3 in). He first emerged at national level at the age of twenty winning both the indoor and outdoor national titles. His throw of 18.99 m (62 ft 3 1/2 in) at that year's Czechoslovak Athletics Championships was a meet record. He threw beyond twenty metres for the event that season and his new best of 20.31 m (66 ft 7 1/2 in) ranked him tenth globally among shot putters for the year. This made him the first Czechoslovak shot putter to reach the top ten since Jiří Skobla in 1961. At the 1971 European Athletics Championships he did not perform as well, however, failing to make it through the qualifying round.

He won his first international medal at the 1972 European Athletics Indoor Championships: following on from Skobla's bronze medal in 1966, Brabec himself took the bronze medal behind Hartmut Briesenick of East Germany and Poland's Władysław Komar. Nationally, Miroslav Janoušek took the indoor title, but Brabec improved his meet record at the outdoor championships with a throw of 19.64 m (64 ft 5 in). He reached his first Olympic final later that year, coming tenth overall. A new national rival – Jaromír Vlk – finished one place ahead of him.

At the 1973 European Athletics Indoor Championships gave his best international performance yet with a throw of 20.29 m (66 ft 6 3/4 in) which brought him the gold medal ahead of East Germany's Gerd Lochmann and fellow Czech Vlk. Brabec became only the third Czechoslovak man to win at that competition, following on from 800 m runner Jozef Plachý and triple jumper Petr Nemšovský. This season proved to be the peak of his career as he achieved a lifetime best mark of 21.04 m (69 ft 1/4 in) at the Czechoslovak Championships – this stood as a record until Remigius Machura bettered it in 1982 with his national title win. He also won a second national title that year. He had his highest ever seasonal ranking in 1973, in fourth place behind Americans Al Feuerbach and George Woods and Germany's Briesenick.

In the 1974 season he was usurped at the national championships by Vlk, but managed to win the third medal of his career at the 1974 European Athletics Indoor Championships. He also competed at the 1974 European Athletics Championships, taking seventh place in what was his highest ever finish at that tournament. A national title double in 1976 preceded his second Olympic appearance at the 1976 Montreal Games, at which he ranked eleventh in the final. He had his last three major international outings at the end of the 1970s, taking sixth at the 1978 and 1979 European Athletics Indoor Championships, as well as eighth at the 1978 European Athletics Championships.

Brabec continued to be a presence at national level, taking national indoor titles in 1978 and 1979, before having three further outdoor wins in 1979, 1981 and 1982. The rise of World Championships medallist Remigius Machura coincided with the end of Brabec's career at a high level.

After retiring from competition, he served as coach for the athletics section of Dukla Prague. Among those he trained were Machura, František Vrbka, Robert Změlík, Vladimíra Racková, Pavel Sedláček, Vladimír Maška and Jan Železný. Brabec died on 20 May 2018.

== International competitions ==
Year	Competition	Venue	Position	Notes
1971	European Indoor Championships	Sofia, Bulgaria	11th	17.82 m
1971	European Championships	Helsinki, Finland	17th (q)	18.50 m
1972	European Indoor Championships	Grenoble, France	3rd	19.94 m
1972	Olympic Games	Munich, Germany	10th	19.86 m
1973	European Indoor Championships	Rotterdam, Netherlands	1st	20.29 m
1974	European Indoor Championships	Gothenburg, Sweden	3rd	19.87 m
1974	European Championships	Rome, Italy	7th	19.73 m
1975	European Indoor Championships	Katowice, Poland	4th	18.96 m
1976	Olympic Games	Montreal, Canada	11th	19.62 m
1978	European Indoor Championships	Milan, Italy	6th	19.36 m
1978	European Championships	Prague, Czechoslovakia	8th	19.27 m
1979	European Indoor Championships	Vienna, Austria	6th	19.07 m

== National titles ==
- Czechoslovak Athletics Championships
  - Shot put: 1971, 1972, 1973, 1975, 1976, 1979, 1981, 1982
- Czechoslovak Indoor Championships
  - Shot put: 1971, 1973, 1975, 1978, 1979

== See also ==
- List of European Athletics Indoor Championships medalists (men)
