= Athletics at the 1970 Summer Universiade – Men's shot put =

The men's shot put event at the 1970 Summer Universiade was held at the Stadio Comunale in Turin with the final on 2 and 3 September 1970.

== Medalists ==
Gold	Silver	Bronze
Hartmut Briesenick; East Germany	Valeriy Voykin; Soviet Union	Uwe Grabe; East Germany

== Results ==
=== Qualification ===
Rank	Heat	Athlete	Nationality	Result	Notes
1	?	Hartmut Briesenick	East Germany	19.28	
2	?	Valeriy Voykin	Soviet Union	18.41	
3	?	Uwe Grabe	East Germany	17.84	
4	?	Yves Brouzet	France	17.58	
5	?	Traugott Glöckler	West Germany	17.49	
6	?	György Nagy	Hungary	17.39	
7	?	Fred DeBernardi	United States	17.35	
8	?	Hannes Schulze-Bauer	Austria	17.25	
9	?	Antero Juntto	Finland	17.18	
10	?	Hans-Dieter Möser	West Germany	17.05	
11	?	Tencho Gospodinov	Bulgaria	16.59	
12	?	Peter Phillips	Australia	16.24	
13	?	Ahmed Bendifallah	Algeria	15.97	
14	?	Bertrand De Decker	Belgium	15.82	

=== Final ===
Rank	Name	Nationality	Result	Notes
1st place, gold medalist(s)	Hartmut Briesenick	East Germany	19.97	
2nd place, silver medalist(s)	Valeriy Voykin	Soviet Union	19.30	
3rd place, bronze medalist(s)	Uwe Grabe	East Germany	19.06	
4	Traugott Glöckler	West Germany	18.75	
5	György Nagy	Hungary	18.46	
6	Hannes Schulze-Bauer	Austria	18.25	
7	Fred DeBernardi	United States	17.97	
8	Yves Brouzet	France	17.82	
9	Hans-Dieter Möser	West Germany	17.49	
10	Antero Juntto	Finland	17.30	
11	Peter Phillips	Australia	16.60	
12	Tencho Gospodinov	Bulgaria	16.33	
