= 1977 European Athletics Indoor Championships – Men's shot put =

The men's shot put event at the 1977 European Athletics Indoor Championships was held on 13 March in San Sebastián.

== Results ==
Rank	Name	Nationality	#1	#2	#3	#4	#5	#6	Result	Notes
1st place, gold medalist(s)	Hreinn Halldórsson	Iceland	20.59	19.09	19.98	18.72	x	20.27	20.59	
2nd place, silver medalist(s)	Geoff Capes	Great Britain	19.98	20.46	x	x	20.30	20.00	20.46	
3rd place, bronze medalist(s)	Władysław Komar	Poland	18.93	x	19.49	x	x	20.17	20.17	
4	Reijo Ståhlberg	Finland	19.79	x	x	19.31	x	19.83	19.83	
5	Yevgeniy Mironov	Soviet Union	19.11	x	x	x	19.57	19.26	19.57	
6	Ralf Reichenbach	West Germany	19.19	19.43	x	x	x	x	19.43	
7	Aleksandr Nosenko	Soviet Union	18.98	18.68	x	x	18.80	19.00	19.00	
8	Gerd Steines	West Germany	18.23	18.98	x	x	x	18.32	18.98	
9	Marco Montelatici	Italy	x	18.15	18.62				18.62	
10	Markku Tuokko	Finland	17.93	18.20	18.53				18.53	
11	Mike Winch	Great Britain	18.41	18.39	x				18.41	
12	Nikola Khristov	Bulgaria	18.37	18.22	18.31				18.37	
