= 1970 European Athletics Indoor Championships – Men's shot put =

The men's shot put event at the 1970 European Athletics Indoor Championships was held on 15 March in Vienna.

== Results ==
Rank	Name	Nationality	Result	Notes
1st place, gold medalist(s)	Hartmut Briesenick	East Germany	20.22	
2nd place, silver medalist(s)	Heinz-Joachim Rothenburg	East Germany	19.70	
3rd place, bronze medalist(s)	Pierre Colnard	France	18.96	
4	Yves Brouzet	France	18.87	
5	Eduard Gushchin	Soviet Union	18.39	
6	Thord Carlsson	Sweden	18.33	
7	Ivan Ivančić	Yugoslavia	18.15	
8	Arnjolt Beer	France	18.03	
9	Miroslav Janoušek	Czechoslovakia	17.78	
10	Tahsin Albayrak	Turkey	14.64	
