= 1974 European Athletics Championships – Men's shot put =

Men's shot put at the European Athletics Championships

The men's shot put at the 1974 European Athletics Championships was held in Rome, Italy, at Stadio Olimpico on 4 and 6 September 1974.

== Medalists ==
Gold	Hartmut Briesenick; East Germany
Silver	Ralf Reichenbach; West Germany
Bronze	Geoff Capes; Great Britain

== Results ==
=== Final ===
6 September

Rank	Name	Nationality	Result	Notes
1st place, gold medalist(s)	Hartmut Briesenick	East Germany	20.50	
2nd place, silver medalist(s)	Ralf Reichenbach	West Germany	20.38	
3rd place, bronze medalist(s)	Geoff Capes	Great Britain	20.21	
4	Aleksandr Baryshnikov	Soviet Union	20.13	
5	Valeriy Voykin	Soviet Union	20.07	
6	Władysław Komar	Poland	19.82	
7	Jaroslav Brabec	Czechoslovakia	19.73	
8	Udo Beyer	East Germany	19.63	
9	Valcho Stoev	Bulgaria	19.62	
10	Jaromír Vlk	Czechoslovakia	19.42	
11	Reijo Ståhlberg	Finland	19.25	
12	Mike Winch	Great Britain	18.89	
13	Ole Lindskjøld	Denmark	18.84	

=== Qualification ===
4 September

Rank	Group	Name	Nationality	Result	Notes
1	B	Władysław Komar	Poland	20.00	Q
2	B	Ralf Reichenbach	West Germany	19.61	Q
3	B	Udo Beyer	East Germany	19.57	Q
4	A	Reijo Ståhlberg	Finland	19.48	Q
5	A	Hartmut Briesenick	East Germany	19.37	Q
6	B	Geoff Capes	Great Britain	19.37	Q
7	A	Ole Lindskjøld	Denmark	19.30	Q
8	A	Valcho Stoev	Bulgaria	19.29	Q
9	B	Mike Winch	Great Britain	19.29	Q
10	B	Jaroslav Brabec	Czechoslovakia	19.21	Q
11	B	Valeriy Voykin	Soviet Union	19.16	Q
12	A	Aleksandr Baryshnikov	Soviet Union	19.10	Q
13	A	Jaromír Vlk	Czechoslovakia	19.09	Q
14	?	Nikolay Khristov	Bulgaria	18.59	
15	?	Miroslav Janoušek	Czechoslovakia	18.56	
16	?	Hreinn Halldorsson	Iceland	18.28	
17	?	Angelo Groppelli	Italy	18.06	
18	?	Hans Höglund	Sweden	17.99	
19	?	Josef Forst	West Germany	17.74	
20	?	Mieczysław Bręczewski	Poland	17.49	

== Participation ==
According to an unofficial count, 20 athletes from 12 countries participated in the event.

- Bulgaria (2)
- Czechoslovakia (3)
- Denmark (1)
- East Germany (2)
- Finland (1)
- Iceland (1)
- Italy (1)
- Poland (2)
- Soviet Union (2)
- Sweden (1)
- Great Britain (2)
- West Germany (2)
