= Masters shot put world record progression =

Progression records for shot put must be set in properly conducted, official competitions under the standing IAAF rules unless modified by World Masters Athletics. Divisions are based upon the age of the athlete, with the category giving a minimum and implying a maximum age (5 years higher than the minimum). So, for example, the M35 division consists of male athletes who have reached the age of 35 but have not yet reached the age of 40, so exactly from their 35th birthday to the day before their 40th birthday.

Weights thrown vary with the division in the following way:

Division	Weight thrown
M35	16 lb/7.260 kg
M40	16 lb/7.260 kg
M45	16 lb/7.260 kg
M50	6 kg
M55	6 kg
M60	5 kg
M65	5 kg
M70	4 kg
M75	4 kg
M80	3 kg
M85	3 kg

The youngest divisions throw exactly the same 16 lb/7.260 kg implement as the Open division. The records are as follows.

Key

Incomplete information Pending Not ratified or later rescinded by WMA Indoor mark
World Athletics includes indoor marks in the record list since 2000, but WMA does not follow that practice.

== M35 ==
Oldfield improved the record three times during his series on his 35th birthday in Berkeley, California. His 22.19 was just 3 cm short of the standing official world record, though he had thrown 22.86 five years earlier, but that throw had been disallowed because Oldfield was a professional, against the rules at that time.

Distance	Athlete	Nationality	Birthdate	Age	Location	Date	Ref
22.48 m	Joe Kovacs	United States	28 June 1989	36 years, 7 days	Eugene	5 July 2025	
22.67 m	Kevin Toth	United States	29 December 1967	35 years, 111 days	Lawrence	19 April 2003	
22.19 m	Brian Oldfield	United States	1 June 1945	38 years, 360 days	San Jose	26 May 1984	
22.02 m	Brian Oldfield	United States	1 June 1945	35 years, 349 days	Modesto	16 May 1981	
21.82 m	Brian Oldfield	United States	1 June 1945	35 years, 14 days	Walnut	15 June 1980	
21.63 m (4th throw)	Brian Oldfield	United States	1 June 1945	35 years, 0 days	Berkeley	1 June 1980	
21.23 m (3rd throw)	Brian Oldfield	United States	1 June 1945	35 years, 0 days	Berkeley	1 June 1980	
20.90 m (1st throw)	Brian Oldfield	United States	1 June 1945	35 years, 0 days	Berkeley	1 June 1980	
20.84 m	Matti Yrjölä	Finland	26 March 1938	38 years, 102 days	Kokemäki	6 July 1976	
20.49 m	Matti Yrjölä	Finland	26 March 1938	35 years, 146 days	Lohja	19 August 1973	
20.17 m	Vilmos Varjú	Hungary	10 June 1937	35 years, 21 days	Budapest	1 July 1972	
19.94 m	Seppo Simola	Finland	27 July 1936	35 years, 57 days	Wuppertal	22 September 1971	
19.77 m	Pierre Colnard	France	18 February 1929	41 years, 151 days	Paris	19 July 1970	
19.70 m	Pierre Colnard	France	18 February 1929	41 years, 140 days	Paris	8 July 1970	
19.57 m	Pierre Colnard	France	18 February 1929	41 years, 130 days	Oulu	28 June 1970	
19.57 m	Pierre Colnard	France	18 February 1929	39 years, 238 days	Mexico City	13 October 1968	
19.41 m	Pierre Colnard	France	18 February 1929	39 years, 168 days	Poitiers	4 August 1968	
19.31 m	Pierre Colnard	France	18 February 1929	39 years, 161 days	Paris	28 July 1968	
19.28 m	Pierre Colnard	France	18 February 1929	39 years, 126 days	Paris	23 June 1968	
19.19 m	Pierre Colnard	France	18 February 1929	39 years, 108 days	Saint-Maur-des-Fossés	5 June 1968	
19.01 m i	Parry O'Brien	United States	28 January 1932	35 years, 0 days	Portland	28 January 1967	
18.42 m	Jiri Skobla	Czech Republic	16 April 1930	35 years, 41 days	Nantes	27 May 1965	
18.01 m	Jiri Skobla	Czech Republic	16 April 1930	35 years, 41 days	Karlovy Vary	2 May 1965	

== M40 ==
Distance	Athlete	Nationality	Birthdate	Location	Date
21.41	Brian Oldfield	United States	1 June 1945	Innsbruck	22 August 1985
21.21	Brian Oldfield	United States	1 June 1945	Los Angeles	8 June 1985
20.44	Ivan Ivancic	Yugoslavia	6 December 1937	Beograd	5 July 1980
20.14i	Ivan Ivancic	Yugoslavia	6 December 1937	Bucharest	17 February 1980
20.12i	Ivan Ivancic	Yugoslavia	6 December 1937	Beograd	12 February 1980
19.77	Pierre Colnard	France	18 February 1929	Colombes	18 July 1970
19.70	Pierre Colnard	France	18 February 1929	Paris	8 July 1970
19.57	Pierre Colnard	France	18 February 1929	Oulu	28 June 1970
19.06	Pierre Colnard	France	18 February 1929	Athens	18 September 1969
19.01	Pierre Colnard	France	18 February 1929	Paris	5 July 1969
18.87	Pierre Colnard	France	18 February 1929	Paris	12 June 1969
18.48	Gudmundur Hermannsson	Iceland	28 July 1925	Reykjavík	28 May 1969
18.48	Gudmundur Hermannsson	Iceland	28 July 1925	Reykjavík	31 May 1968
18.21	Gudmundur Hermannsson	Iceland	28 July 1925	Reykjavík	24 May 1968
17.83	Gudmundur Hermannsson	Iceland	28 July 1925	Reykjavík	11 August 1967
17.42	Gudmundur Hermannsson	Iceland	28 July 1925	Reykjavík	25 June 1967

== M45 ==
Distance	Athlete	Nationality	Birthdate	Age	Location	Date	Ref
20.77 m	Ivan Ivancic	Yugoslavia	6 December 1937	45 years, 268 days	Coblenz	31 August 1983	
20.40 m i	Ivan Ivancic	Yugoslavia	6 December 1937	45 years, 76 days	Budapest	20 February 1983	
20.26 m	Ivan Ivancic	Yugoslavia	6 December 1937	45 years, 76 days	Genova	2 February 1983	
18.22 m	Gudmundur Hermannsson	Iceland	28 July 1925	45 years, 31 days	Voss	28 August 1970	
17.69 m	Gudmundur Hermannsson	Iceland	28 July 1925	45 years, 23 days	Oslo	20 August 1970	
15.34 m	Mieczyslaw Lomowski	Poland	19 September 1914		Gdańsk	1960	

== M50 ==
Distance	Athlete	Nationality	Birthdate	Age	Location	Date	Ref
18.90 m	Andy Dittmar	Germany	5 July 1974	51 years, 77 days	Ohrdruf	20 September 2025	
18.63 m	Andy Dittmar	Germany	5 July 1974	50 years, 78 days	Ohrdruf	21 September 2024	
18.63 m	Stuart Gyngell	Australia	25 November 1963	50 years, 61 days	Wollongong	25 January 2014	
18.45 m	Klaus Liedtke	Germany	5 January 1941	50 years, 196 days	Turku	20 July 1991	
16.62 m	Hermann Hombrecher	Germany	17 July 1925	50 years, 63 days	Wesel	18 September 1975	
17.72 m kg 5.5	Parry O'Brien	United States	18 January 1932	52 years, 165 days	Los Angeles	1 July 1984	
17.56 m kg 5.5	Hermann Hombrecher	Germany	17 July 1925	50 years, 28 days	Toronto	14 August 1975	
16.62 m kg 5.5	George Ker	United States	15 January 1923	51 years, 146 days	Costa Mesa	10 June 1974	

== M55 ==
Distance	Athlete	Nationality	Birthdate	Location	Date
17.57	Klaus Liedtke	Germany	5 January 1941	Schwerte-Ergste	20 May 2000
17.50	Klaus Liedtke	Germany	5 January 1941	Malmö	21 July 1996
17.38	Klaus Liedtke	Germany	5 January 1941	Gelsenkirchen	22 June 1996
15.95	Peter Speckens	Germany	28 May 1935	Budapest	11 July 1990
15.77 kg 5.5	Hermann Hombrecher	Germany	17 July 1925	Helsinki	6 August 1980
15.75 kg 5.5	George Ker	United States	15 January 1923	Van Nuys	13 May 1978
14.88 kg 5.5	Nathaniel Heard	United States	1 October 1917	Westwood	23 June 1973

Note: Liedtke's ratified mark by World Masters Athletics is 17.50, but other reports say he threw 17.77 that day

== M60 ==
Distance	Athlete	Nationality	Birthdate	Location	Date
18.37	Klaus Liedtke	Germany	5 January 1941	Cologne	23 June 2001
17.22	Franz Ratzer	Austria	9 January 1939	Linz	26 June 1999
16.46	Joe Keshmiri	United States	25 March 1938	Eugene	27 June 1998
16.25	Peter Speckens	Germany	28 May 1935	Stolberg	17 June 1995
15.83 i	Reino Laino	Finland	8 February 1935	Oulu	19 March 1995
15.60	Torsten Von Wachenfeldt	Sweden	24 December 1927	Lund	30 August 1990
15.41 i	Clifford Blair	United States	20 October 1929	New Jersey	25 February 1990
15.40	Aloysius Sibidol	Malaysia	20 June 1920	Singapore	15 October 1981

== M65 ==
Distance	Athlete	Nationality	Birthdate	Location	Date
16.66	Quenton Tolbert	United States	2 December 1951	Eugene	30 April 2017
15.90	Kurt Goldschmidt	Germany	9 March 1943	Hamburg	25 June 2009
15.78	Kurt Goldschmidt	Germany	9 March 1943	Schweinfurt	12 July 2008
15.55	Klaus Liedtke	Germany	5 January 1941	Witten	18 August 2007
15.42	Klaus Liedtke	Germany	5 January 1941	Bad Salzuflen	1 May 2007
15.29	Wolfgang Hamel	Germany	7 July 1941	Potsdam	30 September 2006
15.23	Karl Heinz Marg	Germany	20 May 1938	Oldenburg	30 June 2004
15.12	Hal Smith	United States	7 December 1936	Glendora	19 January 2002
14.87 i	Reino Laine	Finland	8 February 1935	Gothenburg	11 March 2000
14.71	Torsten Von Wachenfeldt	Sweden	24 December 1927	Buffalo	18 July 1995
14.43	Torsten Von Wachenfeldt	Sweden	24 December 1927	Miyazaki	15 October 1993
14.70 4 kg	Reino Nokelainen	Finland	19 February 1920	Helsingborg	3 August 1985
13.96	Mike Castaneda	United States		Santa Ana	30 June 1984

== M70 ==
Distance	Athlete	Nationality	Birthdate	Age	Location	Date
16.33 m	Quenton Tolbert	United States	2 December 1951	70 years, 156 days	Eugene	7 May 2022
15.89 m	Karl Heinz Marg	Germany	20 May 1938	70 years, 52 days	Schweinfurt	11 July 2008
15.42 m	Gerald Vaughn	United States	17 November 1935	71 years, 204 days	Atlanta	9 June 2007
15.39 m A	Gerald Vaughn	United States	17 November 1935	70 years, 101 days	Colorado Springs	26 February 2006
14.80 m	Torsten Von Wachenfeldt	Sweden	24 December 1927	72 years, 127 days	Helsingborg	29 April 2000
14.77 m	Arnie Gaynor	United States	19 January 1928	70 years, 172 days	Fullerton	10 July 1998
14.55 m i	Arnold Randma	Estonia	24 August 1924	71 years, 106 days	Tartu	8 December 1995
14.32 m	Arnold Randma	Estonia	24 August 1924	70		1995
14.05 m	Voitto Elo	Finland	8 January 1915	70 years, 166 days	Rome	23 June 1985

== M75 ==
Distance	Athlete	Nationality	Birthdate	Location	Date
14.48 m i	Karl Heinz Marg	Germany	20 May 1938	Budapest	26 March 2014
14.24 m	Karl Heinz Marg	Germany	20 May 1938	Mönchengladbach	12 July 2013
14.13 m	Karl Heinz Marg	Germany	20 May 1938	Wilhelmshaven	8 June 2013
13.84 m	Heiner Will	Germany	22 October 1926	Lübeck	13 April 2002
13.11 m	Erik Eriksson	Finland	14 August 1923	Odense	4 September 1999
13.00 m	Erik Eriksson	Finland	14 August 1923	Gateshead	1 August 1999
12.85 m	Elof Hohan Wiklund	Sweden	13 February 1921	Visby	24 August 1996
12.80 m	Voitto Elo	Finland	8 January 1915	Vihti	27 May 1990
12.88 m i	Voitto Elo	Finland	8 January 1915	Kuortane	3 March 1990
12.64 m	Ross Carter	United States	10 March 1914	Boulder	3 September 1989
12.45 m	Ross Carter	United States	10 March 1914	Eugene	29 July 1989
12.41 m	Ross Carter	United States	10 March 1914	San Diego	20 July 1989
12.11 m	Gerhard Schepe	Germany	26 August 1911	Melbourne	28 November 1987
12.71 m 8 lb	Vernon Cheadle	United States	6 February 1910	Goleta	4 May 1985

== M80 ==
Distance	Athlete	Nationality	Birthdate	Location	Date
13.98	Leo Saarinen	Finland	27 June 1929	Kangasala	15 August 2009
13.86	Leo Saarinen	Finland	27 June 1929	Orivesi	21 July 2009
13.85	Leo Saarinen	Finland	27 June 1929	Jyväskylä	12 July 2009
13.74	Arnie Gaynor	United States	19 January 1928	Cerritos	17 January 2009
12.90	Heiner Will	Germany	22 October 1926	Rendsburg	30 October 2006
12.40	Erik Eriksson	Finland	14 August 1923	Vihti	28 May 2006
12.29	Erik Eriksson	Finland	14 August 1923	Salo	6 May 2006
12.27	Ross Carter	United States	10 March 1914	Eugene	25 June 1994
12.02	Gerhard Schepe	Germany	26 August 1911	Miyazaki	16 October 1993
11.20	Osmo Renvall	Finland	10 November 1910	Vantaa	16 June 1991

== M85 ==
Distance	Athlete	Nationality	Birthdate	Location	Date
12.38	Roland Heiler	Germany	20 December 1938	Erding	14 June 2024
12.50 i	Osten Edlund	Sweden	26 November 1934	Satra	11 January 2020
11.94	Bernhard Karlsson	Sweden	18 November 1933	Valö	21 September 2019
11.82	Leo Saarinen	Finland	27 June 1929	Kuhmoinen	2 August 2014
11.61	Leo Saarinen	Finland	27 June 1929	Töysä	23 July 2014
11.53	Erik Eriksson	Finland	14 August 1923	Valkeakoski	16 May 2009
11.38	Erik Eriksson	Finland	14 August 1923	Salo	9 May 2009
11.05	Erik Eriksson	Finland	14 August 1923	Pori	16 August 2008
10.82	Helmer Heinonen	Finland	6 September 1920	Turku	11 June 2006
10.62	Helmer Heinonen	Finland	6 September 1920	Helsinki	4 June 2006
10.49	Helmer Heinonen	Finland	6 September 1920	Vihti	28 May 2006
10.90 i	Helmer Heinonen	Finland	6 September 1920	Helsinki	19 February 2006
10.87 i	Helmer Heinonen	Finland	6 September 1920	Vierumäki	5 February 2006
10.42	Ross Carter	United States	10 March 1914	Eugene	19 June 1999
9.68 i	Ross Carter	United States	10 March 1914	Boston	26 March 1999
9.17	Lamberto Cicconi	Italy	7 November 1904	Benevento	12 September 1991
8.49	Lamberto Cicconi	Italy	7 November 1904	Budapest	3 July 1990

== See also ==
- Shot put
- Masters athletics
