= 1979 European Athletics Indoor Championships – Men's shot put =

The men's shot put event at the 1979 European Athletics Indoor Championships was held on 24 February in Vienna.

== Results ==
Rank	Name	Nationality	Result	Notes
1st place, gold medalist(s)	Reijo Ståhlberg	Finland	20.47	
2nd place, silver medalist(s)	Geoff Capes	Great Britain	20.23	
3rd place, bronze medalist(s)	Vladimir Kiselyov	Soviet Union	20.01	
4	Markku Tuokko	Finland	19.55	
5	Anatoliy Yarosh	Soviet Union	19.12	
6	Jaroslav Brabec	Czechoslovakia	19.07	
7	Mike Winch	Great Britain	17.03	
8	Hermann Neudolt	Austria	16.30	
