= 1972 European Athletics Indoor Championships – Men's shot put =

The men's shot put event at the 1972 European Athletics Indoor Championships was held on 11 March in Grenoble.

== Results ==
Rank	Name	Nationality	#1	#2	#3	#4	#5	#6	Result	Notes
1st place, gold medalist(s)	Hartmut Briesenick	East Germany	20.50	x	20.41	x	20.59	20.67	20.67	AR
2nd place, silver medalist(s)	Władysław Komar	Poland	19.83	x	20.32	19.62	19.91	19.89	20.32	
3rd place, bronze medalist(s)	Jaroslav Brabec	Czechoslovakia	17.87	18.82	19.71	x	19.94	19.78	19.94	
4	Heinz-Joachim Rothenburg	East Germany	19.66	x	19.28	19.29	19.70	19.90	19.90	
5	Yves Brouzet	France	x	19.16	19.78	19.80	x	19.26	19.80	
6	Miroslav Janoušek	Czechoslovakia	18.67	19.34	19.08	x	x	x	19.34	
7	Seppo Simola	Finland	18.05	18.52	18.37	18.76	18.97	18.78	18.97	
8	Geoff Capes	Great Britain	x	18.54	x	18.63	18.67	x	18.67	
9	Ivan Ivančić	Yugoslavia	17.61	x	18.08				18.08	
10	Arnjolt Beer	France	17.89	17.74	17.89				17.89	
