= 1974 European Athletics Indoor Championships – Men's shot put =

The men's shot put event at the 1974 European Athletics Indoor Championships was held on 10 March in Gothenburg.

== Results ==
Rank	Name	Nationality	Result	Notes
1st place, gold medalist(s)	Geoff Capes	Great Britain	20.95	AR
2nd place, silver medalist(s)	Heinz-Joachim Rothenburg	East Germany	20.87	NR
3rd place, bronze medalist(s)	Jaroslav Brabec	Czechoslovakia	19.87	
4	Valcho Stoev	Bulgaria	19.85	
5	Anatoliy Yarosh	Soviet Union	19.69	
6	Jaromír Vlk	Czechoslovakia	19.65	
7	Mike Winch	Great Britain	19.20	
8	Ferdinand Schladen	West Germany	18.84	
9	Ole Lindskjøld	Denmark	18.41	
10	Nikola Khristov	Bulgaria	18.25	
11	Hans Almström	Sweden	17.94	
