= University Academy Holbeach =

School in Lincolnshire, England

Coordinates: 52°48′33.27″N 0°00′57.53″E

Location
- Park Road; Holbeach, Lincolnshire, PE12 7PU; England

Information
- Type: Academy
- Local authority: Lincolnshire
- Department for Education URN: 137282 Tables
- Ofsted: Reports
- Principal: Sheila Paige
- Gender: Co-educational
- Age: 11 to 18
- Enrolment: 1321
- Website: http://www.universityacademyholbeach.org/

University Academy Holbeach is a co-educational secondary school and sixth form located in Holbeach, Lincolnshire, England.

== History ==
=== Secondary modern school ===
George Farmer County Secondary Modern School opened on Tuesday 22 April 1958. Work had started in 1956. The name was chosen on Tuesday 18 February 1958. The school was built by William Wright & Sons, of Park Street in Lincoln, for Holland Education Committee. There were four houses - Balmoral, Buckingham, Windsor and Sandringham. The school was officially opened on Wednesday 22 April 1959 by Sir Herbert Shiner of the County Councils' Association.

Construction of the St Guthlac's School in Crowland started in January 1962. It was to open in September 1963, costing £124,000 for 275 children. There was bad weather, in the winter for three months with no building. The headteacher was 36-year-old Herbert Garrett from May 1963. Other teachers were deputy head, Mrs LA Brabben of Deeping St Nicholas, the former head of Maths at the Gleed Girls School; Head of English was Mrs HM McCaskie; Head of Maths was Mr DT Thomas, from Moreton-in-Marsh secondary school in Gloucestershire, originally from Holbeach, and had attended Spalding Grammar School. Tongue End and Deeping St Nicholas attended. 203 children were to attend, with Whaplode Drove and Shepeau Stow. The new school would not open in September, and only a few classrooms could open at the end of October. Most of the school would open in January 1964. Until October 1964, South View Road School was the main school, and the neighbouring British Legion building. The headteacher did not know whether to teach any GCE O-level courses, as he thought that grammar schools were the best place for such teaching. By January 1964, the building was not complete. The new school in Crowland finally opened on Thursday 16 April 1964 St Guthlac's School was officially opened on Tuesday 4 May 1965 by the Bishop of Grantham, Anthony Otter, with the Chairman of Holland County Council, Lieutenant-Colonel George Ambrose Grounds (November 1886 - 9 September 1983).

=== Academy ===
The school was established in 2011 following the closure of The St Guthlac's School in Crowland and George Farmer Technology and Language College in Holbeach (formerly named George Farmer Secondary School). It was created as an academy with the sponsorship of the University of Lincoln which already runs its National Centre for Food Manufacturing directly next to the campus site of the former George Farmer Technology and Language College in Holbeach. The new school building was completed on the old George Farmer site on 4 November 2013.

In 2014 UAH became part of the Lincolnshire Educational Trust MAT along with Holbeach Primary Academy (2015) and Gosberton House Academy (2016). The Chair of the LET was Professor J Scott Davidson of the University of Lincoln and the CEO was Andrew Breckon. In 2019 The Peele Community College in Long Sutton became University Academy Long Sutton which is linked with UAH.

== Notable former pupils ==
=== George Farmer School ===
- Boz Burrell, guitarist
- Geoff Capes, shotputter, and policeman with Cambridgeshire Constabulary, won the 1974 and 1978 Commonwealth shotput
