= 1978 European Athletics Indoor Championships – Men's shot put =

The men's shot put event at the 1978 European Athletics Indoor Championships was held on 12 March in Milan.

== Results ==
Rank	Name	Nationality	#1	#2	#3	#4	#5	#6	Result	Notes
1st place, gold medalist(s)	Reijo Ståhlberg	Finland	18.35	x	19.13	20.02	20.48	x	20.48	
2nd place, silver medalist(s)	Władysław Komar	Poland							20.16	
3rd place, bronze medalist(s)	Geoff Capes	Great Britain							20.11	
4	Aleksandr Baryshnikov	Soviet Union							19.95	
5	Gerd Steines	West Germany							19.81	
6	Jaroslav Brabec	Czechoslovakia							19.36	
7	Marco Montelatici	Italy							19.27	
8	Jean-Pierre Egger	Switzerland							19.04	
9	Mathias Schmidt	East Germany							19.00	
10	Angelo Groppelli	Italy							18.45	
