= Yevgeny Mironov =

Yevgeny Mironov may refer to:

- Yevgeny Mironov (politician) (born 1945), Soviet politician
- Yevgeniy Mironov (born 1949), Soviet shot putter
- Yevgeny Mironov (actor) (born 1966), Soviet and Russian actor
