= Marco Dodoni =

Italian shot putter

Personal information
- National team: Italy: 19 caps (2000-2013)
- Born: 5 September 1972 (age 53) Verona, Italy
- Height: 1.97 kg
- Weight: 120 kg (265 lb)

Sport
- Sport: Athletics
- Event: Shot put
- Club: G.S. Forestale; Athletic Club 96 Alperia
- Coached by: Giovanni Tubini

Achievements and titles
- Personal best: Shot put indoor: 19.85 m (2005)

Marco Dodoni (born 5 September 1972) is a former Italian shot putter, five-time national champion at senior level, who competed in four editions of the European Championships.

== Personal bests ==
- Shot put: 19.85 m ( (Italy) Schio, 17 January 2005)

== Achievements ==
Year	Competition	Venue	Rank	Event	Time	Notes
2002	European Indoor Championships	(Austria) Vienna	20th	Shot put	18.75 m	NQ
2002	European Championships	(Germany) Munich	23rd	Shot put	17.82 m	NQ
2005	European Indoor Championships	(Spain) Madrid	17th	Shot put	18.91 m	NQ
2013	European Indoor Championships	(Sweden) Gothenburg	22nd	Shot put	17.65 m	NQ

== National titles ==
Dodoni won five national championships at individual senior level.

- Italian Athletics Championships
  - Shot put: 2005, 2013 (2)
- Italian Athletics Indoor Championships
  - Shot put: 2005, 2006, 2013 (3)
