= Peter Phillips (athlete) =

Australian athlete (1942–2026)

Personal information
- Full name: Peter Robin Phillips
- Born: 26 March 1942 Sydney, New South Wales, Australia
- Died: 2 February 2026 (aged 83) Brisbane, Queensland, Australia
- Height: 178 cm (5 ft 10 in)
- Weight: 110 kg (243 lb)

Peter Robin Phillips (born 26 March 1942 – 2 February 2026) was an Australian shot putter and weightlifter. He finished in 17th place at the men's 110 kg weightlifting event at the 1972 Summer Olympics. Phillips was Australian shot put champion in 1970 and 1971. He placed 12th in the men's shot put event at the 1970 Summer Universiade.
