= Hreinn Halldórsson =

Icelandic former track and field athlete (born 1949)

Medal record

Men's athletics

Representing Iceland

European Athletics Indoor Championships
Gold medal – first place	1977 San Sebastián	Shot put

Hreinn Halldórsson (born 3 March 1949) is an Icelandic former track and field athlete who competed in the shot put. His personal best for the discipline was 21.09 m (69 ft 2 1/4 in), a former national record.

He twice represented his country at the Summer Olympics and was the gold medallist at the European Athletics Indoor Championships in 1977 (Iceland's first medallist at the competition).

== Career ==
Halldórsson was affiliated with KR Reykjavík sports club during his career. He won several national titles in his career, including straight titles from 1975 to 1981. His throw of 20.88 m (68 ft 6 in) to win the 1977 Icelandic title remains the best ever mark at the competition.

Internationally, Halldórsson had four consecutive wins at the European Cup qualifiers from 1975 to 1981, including a meet record of 20.54 m (67 ft 4 1/2 in). His first major competition was the 1974 European Athletics Championships, but the 25-year-old Halldórsson failed to make it out of the qualifying round. After a ninth-place finish at the 1976 European Athletics Indoor Championships, he entered the 1976 Summer Olympics, where he came 15th in the qualifying round. He topped the podium at the 1977 European Athletics Indoor Championships, taking the first and only continental gold medal of his career. This made him the first Icelandic medallist and champion of the competition and he remains he only male to have topped the podium (Vala Flosadóttir won the women's pole vault in 1996). Later that year he threw a personal best of 21.09 m (69 ft 2 1/4 in), which ranked him fourth in the world and was an Icelandic national record (he remains the country's second best shot putter after Pétur Guðmundsson).

Halldórsson was unable to translate his indoor win to an outdoor one at the 1978 European Athletics Championships, placing eighth. His season's best of 20.95 m (68 ft 8 3/4 in) again ranked him in the top five globally. There were no major events for him to aim for in the 1979 season, but his throw of 20.69 m (67 ft 10 1/2 in) that year ranked him in the global top ten.

Halldórsson was later an All-American thrower for the Alabama Crimson Tide track and field team, finishing runner-up in the shot put at the 1980 NCAA Indoor Track and Field Championships. While at Alabama, he was called "Ice Man". As a 30-year-old freshman he was one of the oldest athletes in the NCAA. He was a bus driver in Reykjavík before coming to Alabama.

His highest placing at a world-level event came at the 1980 Moscow Olympics, where he threw 19.74 m (64 ft 9 in) in qualifying, then 19.55 m (64 ft 1 1/2 in) in the final for tenth place. The latter performance was a metre down on his best that season. In his final top level international competition he was sixth at the 1981 European Athletics Indoor Championships.

== International competitions ==
Year	Competition	Venue	Position	Notes
1974	European Championships	Rome, Italy	16th (q)	18.28 m
1976	European Indoor Championships	Munich, Germany	9th	18.41 m
1976	Olympic Games	Montreal, Canada	15th (q)	18.93 m
1977	European Indoor Championships	San Sebastián, Spain	1st	20.59 m
1978	European Championships	Prague, Czechoslovakia	8th	19.34 m
1980	Olympic Games	Moscow, Soviet Union	10th	19.55 m
1981	European Indoor Championships	Grenoble, France	6th	19.13 m
