= Lewis Capes =

British athlete (born 1971)

Lewis Leonard Capes (born 26 May 1971) is a British former shot put athlete and professional American football player. Capes stood 6 ft 4 in (1.93 m) and weighed 22 stone (310 lb; 140 kg) at his peak condition.

== Early life ==
Capes is the son of the British former shot putter and two-time World's Strongest Man winner Geoff Capes. He was born in Peterborough and brought up in Spalding, Lincolnshire, attending Millfield School. He became a member of Millfield's athletic, rugby and water polo squads where he was coached by Rod Speed. After leaving school, he moved to the United States and attended Santa Monica College (1989–1991), representing the athletic squad and playing defensive end for the football team.

== Competitive participation ==
Capes represented Millfield at the shot put and won the Public Schools' Championships. He represented Somerset Schools in athletics, rugby and water-polo. He then went on to represent the South-West for rugby and eventually gained a position on the England Trent Rugby Schoolboy squad.

At Santa Monica College, he received 2nd team All Conference. He also represented the college in the shot put and received the Kiawanis Athlete of the Year Award. Capes then transferred to Colorado State University on a full athletic scholarship for American football (1989–1994) where he was coached by Earle Bruce and Sonny Lubick. From 1995 through 1998, Capes played for the London Monarchs of the World League of American Football.
