= Liffol-le-Petit =

- Commune
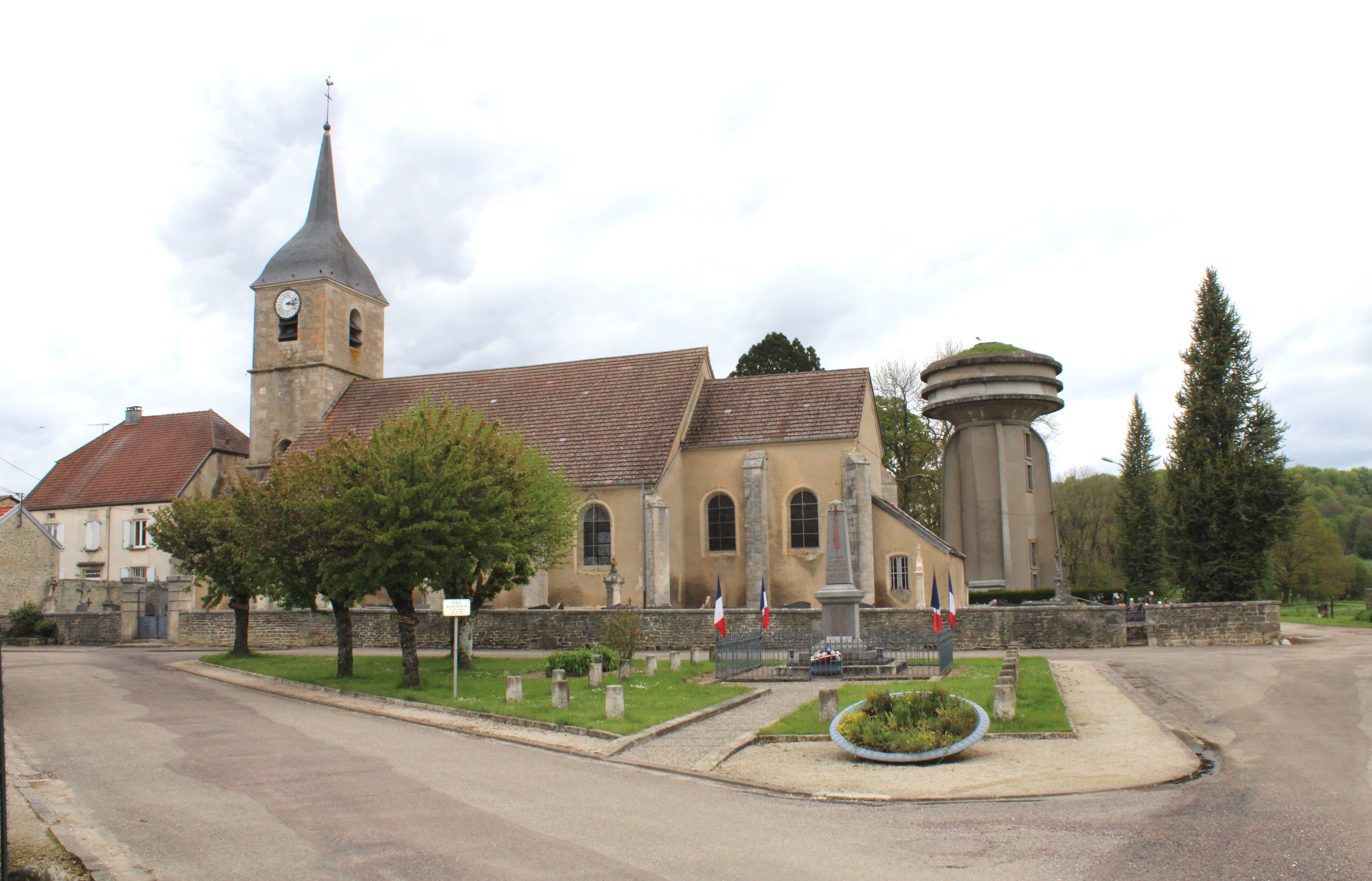
- The church in Liffol-le-Petit

- Coat of arms
- Location of Liffol-le-Petit
- Location within France Location within Grand Est
- Coordinates: 48°17′54″N 5°31′37″E
- Country: France
- Region: Grand Est
- Department: Haute-Marne
- Arrondissement: Chaumont
- Canton: Poissons
- Intercommunality: Ouest Vosgien

Government
  - Mayor (2020–2026): Marie-Christine Silvestre
- Area^{1}: 25.72 km^{2} (9.93 sq mi)
- Elevation: 320 m (1,050 ft)
- Population (2023): 318
  - Density: 12.4/km^{2} (32.0/sq mi)
- Demonym(s): Liffoux, Liffouses or Liffoliens, Liffoliennes or Liffolois, Liffoloises
- Time zone: UTC+01:00 (CET)
  - Summer (DST): UTC+02:00 (CEST)
- INSEE/Postal code: 52289 /52700
- ^{1} French Land Register data, which excludes lakes, ponds, glaciers > 1 km^{2} (0.386 sq mi or 247 acres) and river estuaries.

Liffol-le-Petit (French pronunciation: [lifɔl lə pəti]) is a commune in the Haute-Marne department in north-eastern France.

Athlete Pierre Colnard was born here.

== Population ==
Historical population
| Year | Pop. | ±% p.a. |
|---|---|---|
| 1968 | 357 | — |
| 1975 | 340 | −0.69% |
| 1982 | 358 | +0.74% |
| 1990 | 347 | −0.39% |
| 1999 | 355 | +0.25% |
| 2007 | 351 | −0.14% |
| 2012 | 317 | −2.02% |
| 2017 | 320 | +0.19% |
| 2023 | 318 | −0.10% |
Source: INSEE

== See also ==
- Communes of the Haute-Marne department
