= 1980 European Athletics Indoor Championships – Men's shot put =

Men's shot put

The men's shot put event at the 1980 European Athletics Indoor Championships was held on 2 March in Sindelfingen.

== Results ==
Rank	Name	Nationality	#1	#2	#3	#4	#5	#6	Result	Notes
1st place, gold medalist(s)	Zlatan Saračević	Yugoslavia	20.43	19.40	19.09	x	19.76	x	20.43	
2nd place, silver medalist(s)	Jaromír Vlk	Czechoslovakia	19.77	20.19	19.73	19.70	19.58	19.70	20.19	
3rd place, bronze medalist(s)	Ivan Ivančić	Yugoslavia	19.48	x	x	19.28	19.32	x	19.48	
4	Remigius Machura	Czechoslovakia							18.56	
