= University Academy Long Sutton =

Coordinates: 52.7937°N 0.1302°E

Location
- 84 Little London; Long Sutton, Lincolnshire, PE12 9LF; England

Information
- Type: Academy
- Local authority: Lincolnshire
- Trust: Lincolnshire Educational Trust
- Department for Education URN: 147268 Tables
- Ofsted: Reports
- Headteacher: Liam Davé
- Gender: Co-educational
- Age: 11 to 16
- Enrolment: 654 as of September 2020
- Website: uals.org.uk

University Academy Long Sutton (formerly The Peele Community College) is a co-educational secondary school located in Long Sutton in the English county of Lincolnshire. The school educates pupils from the local surrounding areas in Lincolnshire, and a little from Cambridgeshire and Norfolk

== History ==
=== Secondary modern school ===
Work started in 1956, along with the secondary school in Holbeach, to open by the end of 1957. Both secondary modern schools together cost £359,000. It opened on Wednesday 23 April 1958. It was built by Dagless Ltd of Wisbech, with architect Anthony Cox. The Peele County Secondary School was officially opened Wednesday 23 April 1958, the same day as the Holbeach school, by Sir Edward Boyle.

The headmaster was chosen at the end of June 1957, to be Frederick Alan Noon, aged 51, the headmaster of Kimberley County Secondary School in Nottinghamshire, which had 530 children, and he had trained at Borough Training College from 1923-25. He took over on 1 September 1957. He had played much cricket, and for six years was the chairman of the Nottinghamshire Schools Cricket Association. His son was an RAF pilot, recently qualified from RAF Cranwell. David Noon, who had attended the Henry Mellish Grammar School, would fly the Vickers Valiant with 49 Squadron at RAF Wittering Unfortunately 30 year old Squadron Leader David Alan Noon would be killed on Friday 30 December 1966 at Stokeham in north Nottinghamshire, when his Jet Provost XP569, from RAF Syerston, crashed at 2.30pm, also killing 18 year old Pilot Officer Christopher Roberts of Walton-on-Thames. Firemen from Retford and Tuxford had dragged both pilots from the burning plane. His funeral was at Flintham on Friday 6 January 1967, conducted by Rev Alfred Wyatt. He had two daughters aged 2 and 5.

In November 1957 the deputy headmaster was appointed, Mr WR Pepper, who had worked with Mr Noon. Mr Pepper came from Hucknall, and had taught Geography and English at Kimberley for eight years. Mrs C Akester came from Stanhoe School in Norfolk, the head of Maths. Mr AE Bird came from Alderman Jex Secondary Modern in Norwich, and PE teacher Mr D Scott came from Wisbech Grammar School.

The school was originally to be called the Long Sutton County Secondary School. Until 1974, it was part of East Elloe Rural District, under Holland County Council. But by March 1958 the school had only recruited around 20 teachers, so the only third and fourth years would join from September, around 180 children. Around 30 more teachers were needed.

It was planned to have 800 children. There was room for 250 bicycles. The school was named after Thomas Peele, chosen by the school governors. But due to a shortage of teachers, the fourth year did not start in September 1958, but was planned to start in September 1959. The two Gleed schools and the Holbeach school had a shortage of teachers. But the new Holbeach school had attracted significantly more teachers than the Long Sutton school. Holland County Council would likewise name its other new secondary schools after local dignatories, such as that at Old Leake.

The headteacher Mr Noon strongly believed in the eleven-plus selection system. At the official opening, the headmaster wanted to get more married women back into teaching, being attended by Sir Oswald Giles.

In June 1959, Sir Oswald Giles proposed that the Holbeach and Long Sutton schools work together, to provide a wider range of subjects. This would happen in the two Isle of Axholme secondary modern schools, so as to not duplicate any stretched resources.

Mr Noon retired in July 1970, and died in August 1985. 43-year-old Herbert Garrett, of Deeping St James, was the headmaster from September 1970, being the former head of St Guthlac's School in Crowland, right from start in 1964. He retired in 1986. The cane was last given in around 1971. A new gym was added in 1975.

The new headmaster from September 1986 was Des Eames, the former deputy headmaster; he had been at the school since around 1972. He lived on the same street as the former headmaster, in Deeping St James. The deputy head was Mrs Margaret Price. The sports centre opened on Tuesday 2 September 1986.

Norman Barton, from Boston, but originally from Blackburn, was headmaster from 1992; he had been an education inspector with Oldham for five years. Mr Barton left in July 1998 to work with military schools in Germany. The deputy head briefly took over in September 1998, until 42-year-old John Anthony took over in April 1999. He had been head of PE at the Holbeach secondary school, then at Queen's School in Wisbech, then deputy headmaster at Sawston Village College.

=== Academy ===
Previously a foundation school administered by Lincolnshire County Council, in July 2019 The Peele Community College converted to academy status and was renamed University Academy Long Sutton. The school is now sponsored by the Lincolnshire Educational Trust which is administered by the University of Lincoln, and also includes University Academy Holbeach.

University Academy Long Sutton offers GCSEs and BTECs as programmes of study for pupils.

== Exam results ==
In 2000 the school was in the bottom 50 schools in England, with 9% of 5 grades A-C, changing from 25% the year before.
