= Geoff Capes =

English shot putter and strongman (1949–2024)

Geoff Capes JP
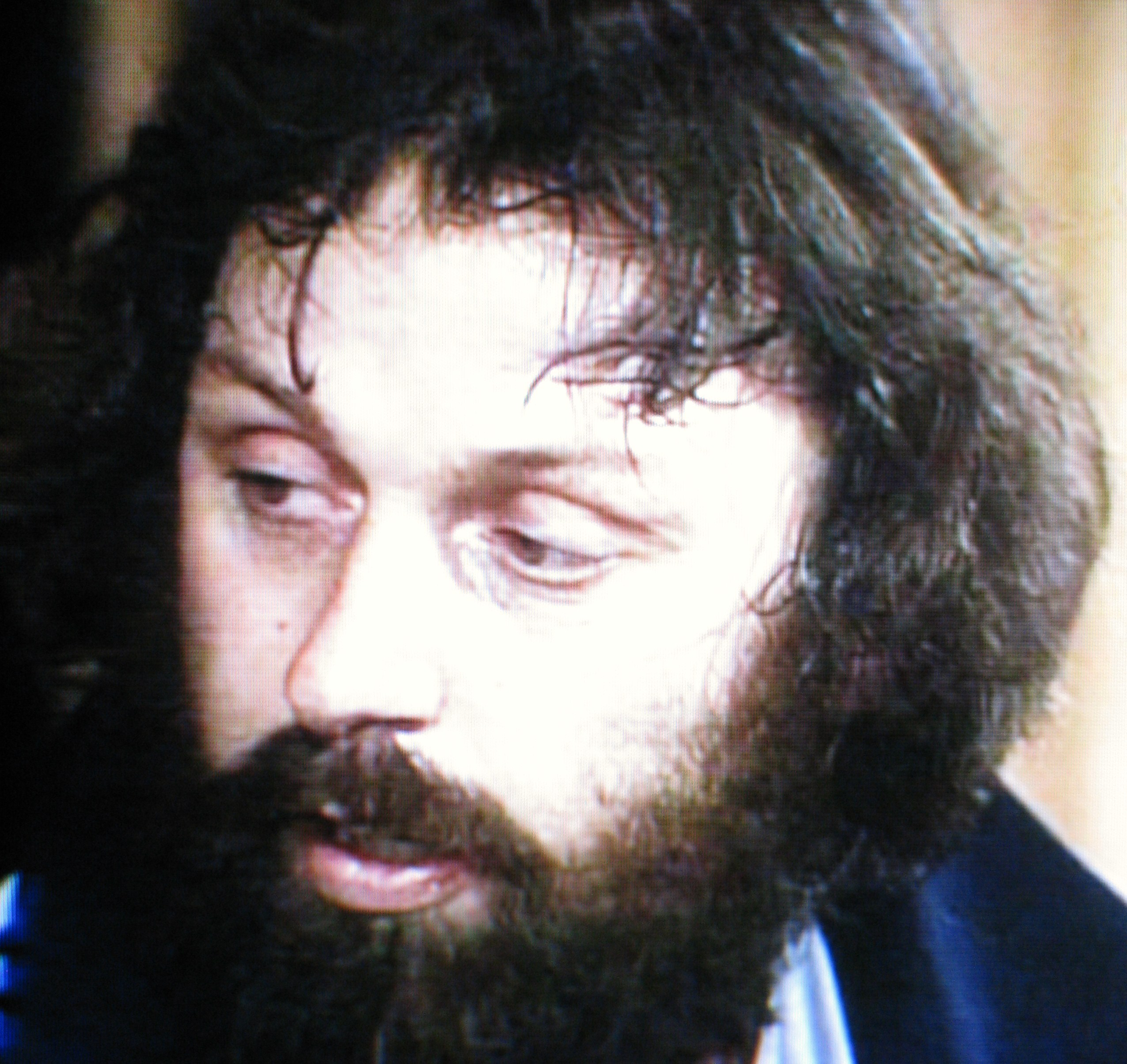
- Geoff Capes, 1980s

Personal information
- Born: Geoffrey Lewis Humberg Capes; 23 August 1949 Holbeach, Lincolnshire, England
- Died: 23 October 2024 (aged 75) Lincoln, England
- Years active: 1970–1989
- Height: 197 cm (6 ft 5 1/2 in)
- Weight: 170 kg (375 lb)

Sport
- Country: Great Britain and England
- Club: Birchfield Harriers
Medal record
Men's athletics
Representing Great Britain
European Championships
Bronze medal – third place	1974 Rome	Shot put
European Indoor Championships
Gold medal – first place	1974 Gothenburg	Shot put
Gold medal – first place	1976 Munich	Shot put
Silver medal – second place	1975 Katowice	Shot put
Silver medal – second place	1977 San Sebastián	Shot put
Silver medal – second place	1979 Vienna	Shot put
Bronze medal – third place	1978 Milan	Shot put
Representing England
Commonwealth Games
Gold medal – first place	1974 Christchurch	Shot put
Gold medal – first place	1978 Edmonton	Shot put
Strongman
Representing United Kingdom
World's Strongest Man
3rd	1980 Vernon
2nd	1981 Magic Mountain
1st	1983 Christchurch
3rd	1984 Mora
1st	1985 Cascais
2nd	1986 Nice
World Muscle Power Classic
2nd	1985 East Kilbride
1st	1987 East Kilbride
2nd	1988 East Kilbride
Europe's Strongest Man
1st	1980 London
2nd	1981 Stockholm
1st	1982 Amsterdam
2nd	1983 Arnhem
1st	1984 Marken
2nd	1987 Amsterdam
World Strongman Challenge
1st	1987 Tokyo

Geoffrey Lewis Humberg Capes JP (23 August 1949 – 23 October 2024) was an English shot putter, strongman, and Highland Games competitor.

He represented England and Great Britain in field athletics, specialising in the shot put, an event in which he was twice Commonwealth champion, twice European indoor champion, competed at three Olympic Games and holds the British record for the shot put since 1980, with a distance of 21.68 metres (71 ft 2 in). As a strongman, he won World's Strongest Man twice, and World Muscle Power Classic twice, along with several other titles including Europe's Strongest Man and Britain's Strongest Man. As a Highland Games competitor, he was six times world champion, first winning the title in Lagos in 1981 and the final title in 1987. Throughout his career, Capes set 17 world records.

Following retirement from competitive sport, he continued to be involved in strength athletics as a referee, coach, event promoter, sportswear retailer and became renowned as a world-class breeder of birds.

== Early life ==
Capes was born on 23 August 1949 in Holbeach, Lincolnshire, the seventh of nine children. He weighed 12.4 pounds (5.6 kg) at birth. He was the seventh child of Eileen (Alcock) Capes, though the eldest of her three children by her third husband Bill Capes. His father was a land worker, while his mother, who stood six feet tall and weighed 17 stone 12 pounds (114 kg), was a matron at a care home. Of his older siblings, the elder two were Braithwaites and the middle four Cannons. Capes told The Daily Telegraph, "The family wasn't just working class, but was on the lowest rung of that very long ladder that is the English class system." He grew up in the town and went to the local secondary school, George Farmer. During his time at school, his behaviour and academic performance were reportedly poor, resulting in frequent caning. On one occasion, a teacher twisted his ear until it bled as punishment for misbehaving in class. The same day, Capes's mother confronted the teacher and punched him.

Capes described himself as a troubled youth and recalled that he was constantly fighting. "If the next town came down on a Friday and there were only eight or nine of them, I'd say, 'Go back and get some more'", he told The Daily Telegraph in 2023. "I'd fight them on my own. I was quite quiet but there was an inner aggression." Despite his natural inclination towards physical activities, Capes initially struggled to find success in sports. He faced a one-year ban from a local football team after striking a referee during a match. He left school at 14 to work as a labourer, carrying sacks of potatoes and taking on various odd jobs. At the age of 15, he loaded 20 tons of potatoes onto a lorry in under 20 minutes, just to demonstrate that it could be done. By 16, he had taken on the role of assistant coalman and odd-job worker for a haulier in Lincolnshire. During tea breaks at the haulier's yard, he developed his arm strength by lifting two four-stone weights overhead. He also created a makeshift gymnasium with two friends. During this time, he joined a local athletics club, where he met Stuart Storey, a hurdler who later competed in the 1968 Olympics.

Capes stated that Storey helped him turn his life around and guided him during his early days in athletics. Storey encouraged him to try shot put and participate in competitions. Lacking the means to buy proper clothes, Capes attended events wearing garments left behind by his mother's patients after they died. His first attempt at competitive shot-putting ended with him being placed second-to-last in the finals of the 1964 All England Schools Athletics Championships.

Capes was a gifted sportsman, and represented Lincolnshire at basketball, football and cross-country. In addition he was a decent sprinter, running 23.7 s for the 200 m. Growing up on the Lincolnshire fens he had an early fascination with the natural world and cared for injured birds and animals from when he was a young boy. After school he worked as a coalman and an agricultural labourer. Following in the footsteps of his grandfather, uncle and older brothers, he joined Cambridgeshire Constabulary in 1970, and remained in the police for ten years; his departure from the police came when he decided to compete in the 1980 Moscow Olympics, despite the British Government's calls for a boycott, and was thereby forced to resign his position.

== Athletics ==
Capes was a shot putter and represented his country over a span of 11 years, winning two Commonwealth Games and two Indoor European Championship titles. His first major competition was the 1970 Commonwealth Games in Edinburgh, where he finished fourth. In the next two games in 1974 and 1978 he took the gold medal. In this period he also became the European Indoor Champion in both 1974 and 1976. His first Olympic experience was in 1972 when he competed in Munich. The 21-year-old Capes did not make it past the qualifying round, but improved on this considerably four years later. Having thrown a personal best of 21.55 metres (70 ft 8 in) on 28 May 1976 at Gateshead, he went into the 1976 Montreal Olympics as one of the favourites for the gold medal. He came second in his qualifying group but sixth overall in the final, the winner being Udo Beyer of East Germany. 1980 was the year Capes threw the longest distance of his career, 21.68 metres (71 ft 2 in) in Cwmbran on 18 May 1980 being a new Commonwealth and British record. He went into the Olympics as the athlete with the best distance that year and once again a favourite for the title. However, he eventually placed fifth, the winner being Vladimir Kiselyov whose Olympic record of 21.35 metres (70 ft 1 in) was well short of what Capes had achieved prior to the Games. Capes said his performance at the 1980 Moscow Olympics had left him "numbed with disappointment".

Capes is the most capped British male athlete of all time, receiving 67 International caps and earning 35 wins, not including a further 35 caps for England. He is a winner of 17 national titles, including being seven times a winner of the AAA championship and three times UK champion. In 1983 he was voted Britain's best-ever field athlete. Capes' 1980 British record still stands. In 2003 Carl Myerscough threw 21.92 metres (71 ft 11 in) but the distance was not ratified.

Colin Bryce, a former Strongman and television commentator for the World's Strongest Man competition, said of Capes in an interview, "When you saw him sprint, you realized just what an absolutely terrifying athlete he was, as in terrifyingly good. He wasn't just a big lump."

== Strongman ==
As a strongman, Capes became a household name in Britain and many parts of the world. He was particularly known for his incredible hand and arm strength, easily tearing London telephone directories in half and bending rolled steel bars measuring over 1 inch in diameter, and three feet in length. Capes turned fully professional in 1980, the Olympics in Moscow being his last event as an amateur athlete. He had already begun to make a name as a strongman having won the inaugural Britain's Strongest Man in 1979. In that competition he beat Bill Anderson, the World Highland Games champion into second place. Bill went on to the 1979 World's Strongest Man, the first Briton to compete in this tournament, whilst Capes concentrated on his athletic career.

In 1980 the Olympics dominated the year and Capes did not compete in Britain's Strongest Man, but he did compete later in the Europe's Strongest Man competition and won that. This ensured his invitation to the 1980 World's Strongest Man and on his first entry he came third behind the by then more experienced Bill Kazmaier and Lars Hedlund. In 1981 he returned and improved to second place, again behind Kazmaier, and in 1982 he came fourth.

1983 World's Strongest Man was the first held outside the United States and in Christchurch, New Zealand; he held off the challenge of a world class field including the young Jón Páll Sigmarsson, Canadian world powerlifting champion, Tom Magee, and the European powerlifting champion, Siem Wulfse to take his first World's Strongest Man title. Capes won the truck pull and weight over bar and came second in farmer's walk, bale hoist and sack load events. The duel between Sigmarsson and Capes heralded the beginning of a great rivalry. The following year in Mora, Sweden, Sigmarsson, eleven years Capes' junior, took the title proclaiming "The King has lost his crown!". Capes retorted "I'll be back" with a third-place finish. He won the sled push and came second in caber toss, rock press and floor press that year.

Capes came to 1985 World's Strongest Man determined to regain his title from Sigmarsson. The competition was held in Cascais, Portugal and Capes managed to win the truck pull, medley, arm over arm pull and swingletree. Despite a horrible last place finish in the crucifix hold, Capes managed to collect enough points to secure his second World's Strongest Man title, holding off Sigmarsson and Cees de Vreugd. Capes' did not forget to celebrate after the end of the final event, the loading race saying "The King is not dead yet!". Their rivalry thrived and Sigmarsson won once again in 1986 with Capes coming second.

Aside from the World's Strongest Man, Capes also won Europe's Strongest Man three times: in London (1980), Amsterdam (1982) and Marken (1984). He regained his Britain's Strongest Man title in 1981 and again in 1983. Capes also won the World Muscle Power Classic championship in 1987, and was ascribed two World Muscle Power championships by the creator of the event, David Webster, although other sources suggest the 1987 victory was the only one. In 1987 his win in the World Muscle Power was accompanied by a win in the World Strongman Challenge and he is one of only three athletes to have won all three titles. There was no World's Strongest Man that year, but an event was held designed specifically to put the three most successful strongmen against one another.

In 1986, Capes won the UK Truck Pulling Championship.

1987 Pure Strength featured Bill Kazmaier, Jón Páll Sigmarsson and Geoff Capes and was held at Huntly Castle in Aberdeenshire, Scotland. Capes entered despite having been in hospital the previous weekend with strained trapeziums. Strong performances in the first few rounds belied his condition but he eventually pulled out during the log-lift and ended the contest in third place. Capes, the oldest of the three, was close to strongman retirement at this stage and the next year, at the 1988 World Muscle Power Classic he finished second, and it proved to be his last major outing as a strongman.

For years, Capes was England's most famous athlete. He featured in various commercials, notably for Volkswagen, where he flipped a Polo car to inspect its underside. His popularity extended to children's games and television, with the World's Strongest Man competition becoming a Christmas Day staple. He was a favorite of Queen Elizabeth II, who "howled in laughter" when her glove stuck to his sweaty hands after he won the Braemar Games in 1982. Former strongman and commentator Colin Bryce remarked compared Cape's unparalleled fame in Britain to that of an NFL star in the United States, describing him as "a true household name."

Capes' daily diet reportedly included seven pints of milk, two loaves of bread, a dozen eggs, two steaks, a jar of baked beans, two cans of sardines, a pound of butter, and a leg of lamb.

== Highland Games ==
Capes competed at many Highland Games gatherings in Scotland and across the world and became a hugely popular and respected figure. He won the World Heavy Events title in Lagos in 1981, in a year when there were two world championships, the second, won in Melbourne by Bill Anderson. He went on to win again in 1983 in Carmunnock and the next four consecutive titles, making him the most successful competitor ever in terms of titles. He set world records in many disciplines, including the 56 lb Weight over bar and brick lifting. As a Highland competitor he was dubbed Geoff Dubh Laidir, translated as Black Strong Geoff. He held the record for shot put at Cowal Highland Gathering − Scotland's only international heavy athletics competition − since 1980 at 18.50 metres (60 ft 8 in).

== Personal records ==
During competitions

- Shot put – 7.3 kg (16 lb) for 21.68 metres (71 ft 2 in) (1980) (British Record)
- Stone put – 10 kg (22 lb) for 16.26 metres (53 ft 4 in) (1982 Scottish Highland Games Association) (World Record)
- Braemar Stone throw – 9 kg (20 lb) for 17.37 metres (57 ft 0 in) (1981 World Highland Games) (World Record)
- Weight throw – 12.5 kg (28 lb) light weight for 28.65 metres (94 ft 0 in) (1987 Kilbirnie Highland Games) (Former World Record)

→ Capes held this record for the first time when he threw 27.74 metres (91 ft 0 in) at 1983 Drumtochty Highland Games

- Weight over bar – 25.5 kg (56 lb) over 5.23 metres (17 ft 2 in) (1981 World Highland Games) (Former World Record)

→ Capes held this record for the first time when he cleared 5.20 metres (17 ft 1 in) at 1981 World's Strongest Man

- Caber toss – 45 kg (99 lb) for 11.16 metres (36 ft 7 in) (1987 Viking Power Challenge) (Former World Record)
- Scottish hammer throw – 10 kg (22 lb) heavy hammer for 32.94 metres (108 ft 1 in)
- Discus throw – 2 kg (4 lb) for 58.34 metres (191 ft 5 in) (1973)
- Bar bending – 11/16 inch (17.5 mm) diameter 4 ft 6 in long Cast iron bar bent to U-shape in 11 seconds (around the neck position) (1982 World's Strongest Man) (World Record)
- Brick lift – 26 British bricks held between arms (1993 Colchester branch trade night) (World Record)
- Oxcart deadlift – 475 kg (1,047 lb) (1985 World's Strongest Man)
- Log press – 145 kg (320 lb) (1982 World's Strongest Man)
- Floor press (log with no handles) – 220 kg (485 lb) (1984 World's Strongest Man)
- Sleigh push – 400 kg (882 lb) for 80m ice course in 17.10 seconds (1984 World's Strongest Man) (World Record)
- Refrigerator race – 193 kg (425 lb) for 100 ft in 10.72 seconds (1980 World's Strongest Man) (World Record)
- Car flip – 650 kg (1,433 lb) x 3 half flips in 19.63 seconds (1986 World's Strongest Man) (World Record)
- Arm over arm uphill boat pull – 235 kg (518 lb) for 12 metres in 19.90 seconds (1985 World's Strongest Man) (World Record)
- Arm over arm truck pull (with a slight decline) – 7,500 kg (16,535 lb) for 30 metres in 17.78 seconds (1986 World's Strongest Man) (World Record)

During training

- Squat – 380 kg (838 lb) in 80s marathon squat suit
- Bench press – 300 kg (661 lb) equipped
- Elevated Deadlift (from 18 inches) – 453.5 kg (1,000 lb)

== Sport after retirement ==
Capes went on to coach many rising stars in both athletics and strength athletics. Adrian Smith later took fifth spot at the World's Strongest Man under the combined coaching of Capes and Bill Pittuck. Capes also helped promote the Daily Star funded UK Strongest Man tournaments until the turn of the millennium.

== Life outside sport ==
Outside his sporting career Capes was for a long time a policeman and prior to that was a member of the Air Training Corps. Prior to his athletic retirement he had been awarded the Queen Elizabeth II Silver Jubilee Medal in 1977, for services to the community. He went on to run a sportswear retail shop in Holbeach, before moving to Spalding where in 1998 he became a Justice of the Peace. At the height of his fame in 1985, the game Geoff Capes Strongman was released on the Amstrad CPC, the ZX Spectrum, the BBC Micro, the Acorn Electron and the Commodore 64 computers, featuring a truck pulling and tug-of-war, allowing control of each muscle group. He also appeared in a memorable TV commercial for the Volkswagen Polo Mk2 in which he picked the car up and rolled it over with his bare hands. His profile also led to numerous appearances on British television, including shows such as Superstars, and Tyne Tees Television programme Supergran in the episode "Supergran Grounded". He appeared on Blue Peter where he lost a challenge from Welsh strongman/showman George Davies (Strang the Strong, Georgie Muscles). In 1987, Capes was a timekeeper on the charity television special The Grand Knockout Tournament.

Capes appeared on the fourth series of Shooting Stars, alongside Patsy Kensit, where he threw a bomb at Johnny Vegas and in 2007 he became the face of Cadbury's Wispa relaunch, appearing on billboards and magazine advertisements. As of spring 2010, he was in the advert for the Great British Food Fight, which appeared on Channel 4, as well as being in an advertisement for Churchill insurance.

=== Bird breeding ===
Aside from sport and television appearances, Capes was famed for breeding budgerigars and had success (a former world champion) on the show bench with his Recessive Pieds. He participated in budgerigar shows across Europe and won a world championship in 1995. In 2008, he was appointed president of the Budgerigar Society and often served as a judge in competitions. "There's something about their colour and beauty that fascinates me", Capes told the Sunday People. "They bring out my gentler side." At the peak of his breeding career, he owned over 300 budgies. He constructed a small wooden aviary behind his house and prepared meals for them each morning. Capes frequently appeared in the pages of Cage & Aviary Birds. He took up the hobby when a policeman, having chatted for an hour to a man he had to arrest for non-payment of a fine.

== Personal life ==
Capes lived in Stoke Rochford, near Grantham. He married Gillian Fox in 1971. The marriage ended in divorce in 1982. His daughter Emma was English Schools' shot put champion and Youth Olympics bronze medallist. His son Lewis played American football for the London Monarchs. He had five grandsons and a granddaughter. In 2018, he married Kashmiro Bhatti. He was appointed a Justice of the Peace on the Spalding bench in 1998. His autobiography Big Shot was published by Hutchinson in 1981.

== Competition record ==
=== International competitions ===
Year	Competition	Venue	Position	Event	Notes
Representing Great Britain and England
1970	British Commonwealth Games	Edinburgh, United Kingdom	4th	Shot put	17.06 m
1971	European Indoor Championships	Sofia, Bulgaria	10th	Shot put	17.84 m
1971	European Championships	Helsinki, Finland	16th (q)	Shot put	18.54 m
1972	European Indoor Championships	Grenoble, France	8th	Shot put	18.67 m
1972	Olympic Games	Munich, West Germany	20th (q)	Shot put	18.94 m
1973	European Indoor Championships	Rotterdam, Netherlands	7th	Shot put	19.26 m
1974	British Commonwealth Games	Christchurch, New Zealand	1st	Shot put	20.74 m
1974	British Commonwealth Games	Christchurch, New Zealand	5th	Discus throw	51.84 m
1974	European Indoor Championships	Gothenburg, Sweden	1st	Shot put	20.95 m
1974	European Championships	Rome, Italy	3rd	Shot put	20.21 m
1975	European Indoor Championships	Katowice, Poland	2nd	Shot put	19.98 m
1976	European Indoor Championships	Munich, West Germany	1st	Shot put	20.64 m
1976	Olympic Games	Montreal, Canada	6th	Shot put	20.36 m
1977	European Indoor Championships	San Sebastián, Spain	2nd	Shot put	20.46 m
1978	European Indoor Championships	Milan, Italy	3rd	Shot put	20.11 m
1978	Commonwealth Games	Edmonton, Canada	1st	Shot put	19.77 m
1978	European Championships	Prague, Czechoslovakia	–	Shot put	DQ
1980	Olympic Games	Moscow, Soviet Union	5th	Shot put	20.50 m

=== National championships ===
British National Championships (AAA)

- 1st: 1972, 1973, 1975–1979
- 2nd: 1971, 1974, 1980
- 3rd: 1970

UK Championships

- 1st in shot put: 1977–1979
- 3rd in discus: 1978

=== Highland Games ===
World Highland Games Championships

- Winner 1981 to 1987

=== Strongman contests ===
World's Strongest Man

- 1st: 1983, 1985
- 2nd: 1981, 1986
- 3rd: 1980, 1984
- 4th: 1982

World's Strongest Team

- Winner: 1987

World Strongman Challenge

- Winner: 1987

Europe's Strongest Man

- 1st: 1980, 1982, 1984
- 2nd: 1983

World Muscle Power

- 1st: 1985
- 2nd: 1987, 1988

Battle of the Giants

- 1st: 1987–1989

Commonwealth Games Strongman

- 2nd: 1986

Britain's Strongest Man

- 1st 1979, 1981, 1983

British Muscle Power Championship

- 1st: 1986, 1987

UK Truck Pulling Championships − (Mercedes Benz)

- 1st: 1986
