= Athletics at the 1974 British Commonwealth Games – Men's shot put =

Men's shot put at the 1974 British Commonwealth Games
- Venue: Queen Elizabeth II Park
- Dates: 2 February

Medalists
gold medal	Geoff Capes	England
silver medal	Mike Winch	England
bronze medal	Bruce Pirnie	Canada

The men's shot put event at the 1974 British Commonwealth Games was held on 2 February at the Queen Elizabeth II Park in Christchurch, New Zealand.

== Results ==
Final result
Rank	Name	Nationality	Distance	Notes
1st place, gold medalist(s)	Geoff Capes	England	20.74	GR
2nd place, silver medalist(s)	Mike Winch	England	19.36	
3rd place, bronze medalist(s)	Bruce Pirnie	Canada	18.68	
4	Bill Tancred	England	18.13	
5	Robin Tait	New Zealand	17.71	
6	Ray Rigby	Australia	16.98	
7	Tony Satchwell	Jersey	16.29	
8	Sitiveni Rabuka	Fiji	14.14	
