= Vladimir Kiselyov =

Soviet athlete (1957–2021)

Personal information
- Born: 1 January 1957 Myski, Kemerovo Oblast, Russian SFSR, Soviet Union
- Died: 7 January 2021 (aged 64) Kremenchuk, Poltava Oblast, Ukraine
Medal record
Men's athletics
Representing the Soviet Union
Olympic Games
Gold medal – first place	1980 Moscow	Shot put
European Indoor Championships
Bronze medal – third place	1979 Vienna	Shot put

Vladimir Viktorovich Kiselyov (Russian: Владимир Викторович Киселёв; Ukrainian: Володимир Вікторович Кисельов; sometimes listed as Volodymyr Kyselyov 1 January 1957 – 7 January 2021) was a Soviet-born Ukrainian athlete who mainly competed in the shot put during his career.

He competed for the USSR in the 1980 Summer Olympics held in Moscow, Soviet Union where he won the gold medal in the men's shot put event.

In 1985, Kiselyov lost 25 kg (55 lbs) and almost died as a result of past use of prohibited substances, specifically testosterone.

== Death ==
Vladimir Kiselyov died on January 7, 2021. It was announced by Ruslan Protsenko, the Deputy Mayor of the city of Kremenchug in the Poltava region.

The cause of death were not disclosed.
