= Władysław Komar =

Polish athletics competitor (1940–1998)

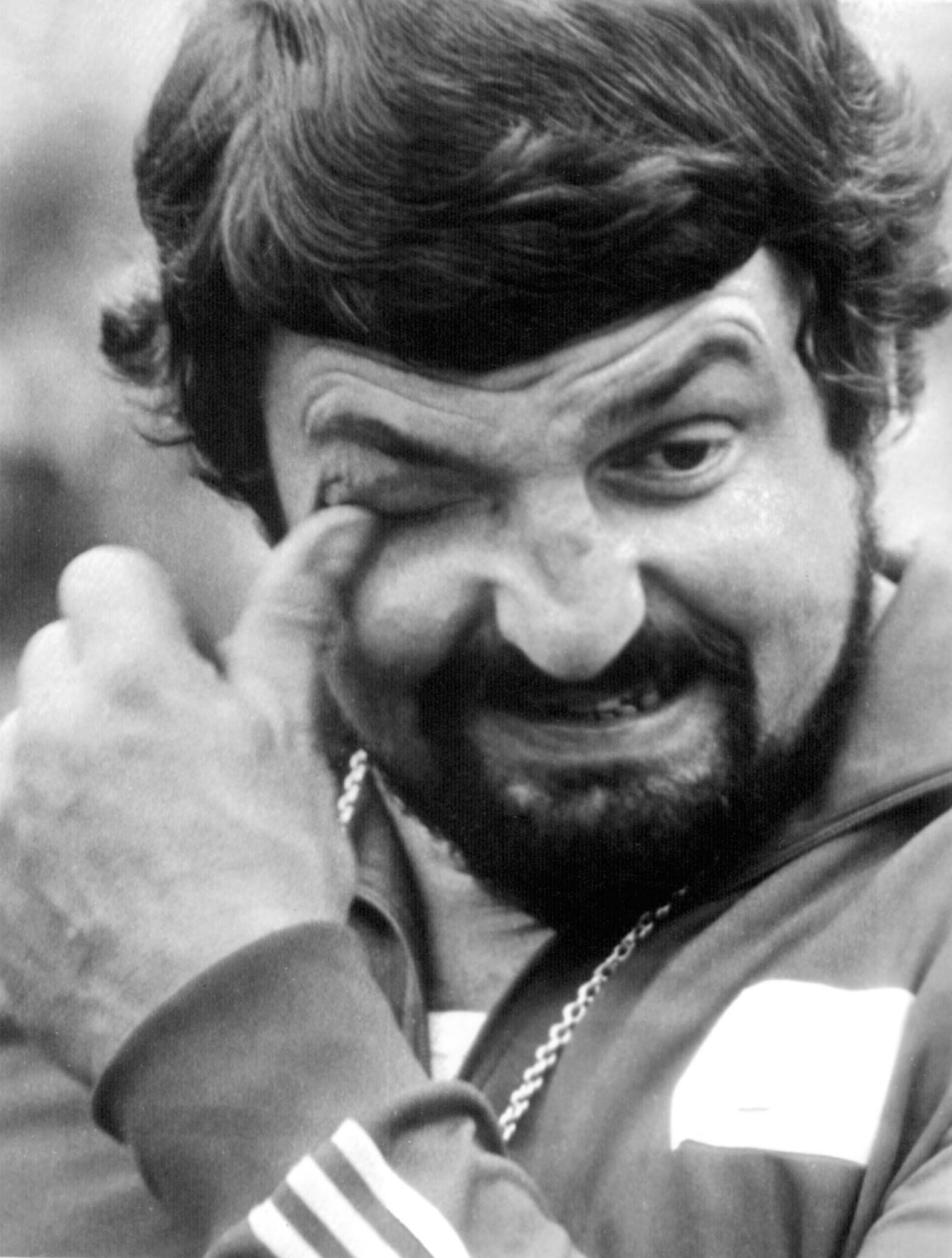
- Komar in 1972

Personal information
- Born: 11 April 1940 Kaunas, Lithuania
- Died: 17 August 1998 (aged 58) Przybiernów, Poland
- Education: Academy of Physical Education in Poznań
- Years active: 1962–1980
- Height: 1.96 m (6 ft 5 in)
- Weight: 125 kg (276 lb)

Sport
- Sport: Shot put
- Club: Lechia Gdańsk; Wybrzeże Gdańsk; Gwardia Warszawa; Polonia Warszawa
- Coached by: Sławomir Zieleniewski; Janusz Koszewski
Medal record
Men's athletics
Representing Poland
Olympic Games
Gold medal – first place	1972 Munich	Shot put
European Championships
Bronze medal – third place	1966 Budapest	Shot put
Bronze medal – third place	1971 Helsinki	Shot put
European Indoor Championships
Silver medal – second place	1968 Madrid	Shot put
Silver medal – second place	1972 Grenoble	Shot put
Silver medal – second place	1978 Milan	Shot put
Bronze medal – third place	1967 Prague	Shot put
Bronze medal – third place	1977 San Sebastián	Shot put

Władysław Stefan Komar (11 April 1940 – 17 August 1998) was a Lithuanian-born Polish shot putter, actor and cabaretist. Competing in three Summer Olympics between 1964 and 1972, he won the gold medal at the Munich Games in 1972 with a throw of 21.18 metres. His nickname was "King Kong" Komar as attributed to a Sports Illustrated article.

His personal bests in the shot put were 21.19 metres outdoors (Warsaw 1974) and 20.32 metres indoors (Grenoble 1972), both being national records during his career.

== Early life ==
Władysław Komar was born in Kaunas, Lithuania on 11 April 1940 to Władysław Komar-Zabożyński and Wanda Jasińska, and the noble Komarai family owned the Raguvėlė Manor. Both of his parents were athletes – his father competed for Lithuania as Vladislovas Komaras at the 1934 European Athletics Championships in the high jump and 110 metres hurdles; his mother was a shot putter, who set a national record in the early 1930s. During World War II, the family moved to Didieji Gulbinai. His father, member of the Polish Home Army, was murdered in 1944 in Glitiškės by the Ypatingasis būrys.

After the Soviet re-occupation of Lithuania, young Wladysław escaped with his mother and older sister to Warsaw in 1945 as the mother feared they might get sent to Siberia by the Soviets like many former land owners. They first travelled through Białystok to Warsaw before his being placed in an orphanage near Poznań, in Western Poland. In 1953, after graduating from primary school by the orphanage, his mother brought him to live with her in Warsaw.

== Boxing career ==
The first sport that Komar took up was amateur boxing, which he started practising in 1955 and competed in the heavyweight category. He went as far as representing his country at the under-20 level. His last fight was in a junior team match against Italy in 1959 when he was knocked out by Giorgio Masteghin in the first round. After that he got convinced to switch to athletics although initially he also practised rugby and handball.

== Athletics career ==
At the beginning of his athletics career he also competed in the high jump and decathlon. He even set a Polish record in the latter in 1963. Komar's major championships debut came at the 1962 European Championships in Belgrade where he finished fourth behind compatriot Alfred Sosgórnik. In February next year he threw 18.60 metres, his first national record. In June 1964, he improved the national record to 19.50 metres, just 6 centimetres shy of the European record. This result made him one of the favourites for the October Olympic Games held in Tokyo, however, he only managed ninth place with 18.20 metres. In 1966 he set the Polish indoor record of 19.20 metres and later that year the outdoor record of 19.61. Afterwards he competed at his second European Championships in Budapest where he managed the bronze.

At his third Olympic Games, in Munich, he won the shot put competition throwing 21.18 metres, just one centimetre further than the American George Woods and four ahead of East Germans, Briesenick and Gies.

== After retirement ==
Komar later became an actor, appearing in more than ten films, including Kazimierz Wielki (1975), Soviet Boris Godunov (1986), Roman Polanski's Pirates (1986), as well as Magnat (1987) and Kiler (1997).

He took part in the professional wrestling show, organised by a former Polish Olympic wrestler, Andrzej Supron, which toured the Soviet Union in 1989 and 1990.

== Death ==
He died on 17 August 1998 in a car crash coming back from an athletics meeting in Międzyzdroje together with another Olympic gold medallist, pole vaulter Tadeusz Ślusarski. The car they hit was driven by another athlete, former sprinter, Jarosław Marzec, who died several days later. A memorial athletics meeting in their name is held every year in Międzyzdroje.

== Personal life ==
Komar was married twice. His first wife, Małgorzata Spychalska (b. 1942), was a daughter of Marian Spychalski, a Polish Minister of Defence and member of the Politburo. They divorced in 1973. With his second wife Maria (1950–2008), a former volleyball player, he had one son Mikołaj (b. 1977) who went on to become a photographer.

== Competition record ==
Year	Competition	Venue	Position	Notes
Representing Poland
1962	European Championships	Belgrade, Serbia	4th	18.00 m
1964	Olympic Games	Tokyo, Japan	9th	18.20 m
1966	European Championships	Budapest, Hungary	3rd	18.68 m
1967	European Indoor Games	Prague, Czechoslovakia	3rd	18.85 m
1968	European Indoor Games	Madrid, Spain	2nd	18.40 m
1968	Olympic Games	Mexico City, Mexico	6th	19.28 m
1971	European Indoor Championships	Sofia, Bulgaria	4th	19.43 m
1971	European Championships	Helsinki, Finland	3rd	20.04 m
1972	European Indoor Championships	Grenoble, France	2nd	20.32 m
1972	Olympic Games	Munich, Germany	1st	21.18 m
1974	European Championships	Rome, Italy	6th	19.82 m
1977	European Indoor Championships	San Sebastián, Spain	3rd	20.17 m
1978	European Indoor Championships	Milan, Italy	2nd	20.16 m

== Filmography ==
- Kazimierz Wielki (1975) as Władzio
- Skradziona kolekcja (1979) as Driver
- Pirates (1986) as Jesus
- Boris Godunov (1986) as Sobansky
- Przyłbice i kaptury (1986, TV series) as Dzieweczka
- Magnat (1987) as Guide in the palace
- Opowieść Harleya (1988) as Man working for Witek
- Sonata marymoncka (1988) as Zieliński
- W klatce (1988) as Landlady's husband
- And the Violins Stopped Playing (1988) as Dombrowski
- La Treizième voiture (1993) as Alexander
- Blood of the Innocent (1994) as Thug
- Kiler (1997) as Uszat
- Prostytutki (1998) as Szogun, Bodyguard at Gejsza
