= Angelo Groppelli =

Italian shot putter (1946–2026)

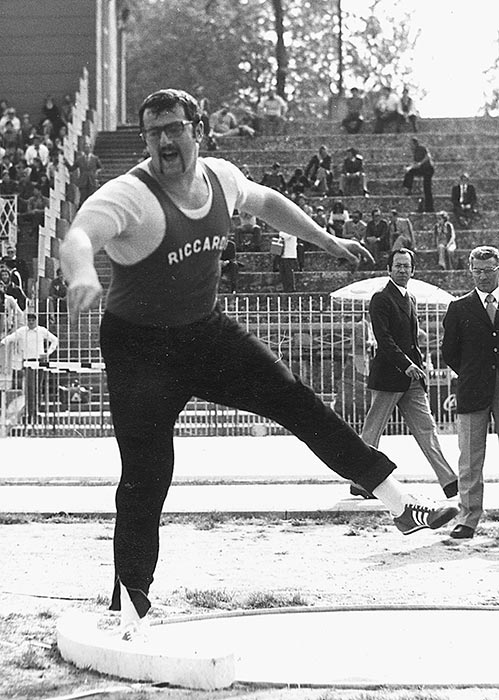

Personal information
- National team: Italy: 28 caps (1972–1981)
- Born: 12 July 1946 Varese, Italy
- Died: October 2026 (aged 80) Varese, Italy

Sport
- Sport: Athletics
- Event: Shot put
- Club: Atletica Riccardi Milano

Achievements and titles
- Personal best: Shot put: 20.03 m (1979)

Angelo Groppelli (12 July 1946 – October 2026) was an Italian shot putter, seven-time national champion at senior level, who competed in two editions of the European Championships (1974, 1978). Groppelli was born in Varese on 12 July 1946.

Groppelli died there in October 2026, at the age of 80.

== National records ==
- Shot put: 19.20 m (Bergamo, 3 June 1978) – record holder until 6 August 1978.

== Personal bests ==
- Shot put: 20.03 m (Turin, 9 June 1979)

== Achievements ==
Year	Competition	Venue	Rank	Event	Time	Notes
1974	European Championships	Rome	17th	Shot put	18.06 m	NQ
1978	European Championships	Prague	17th	Shot put	18.04 m	NQ

== National titles ==
Groppelli won seven national championships at individual senior level.

- Italian Athletics Championships
  - Shot put: 1975, 1978, 1979, 1980 (4)
- Italian Indoor Athletics Championships
  - Shot put: 1976, 1979, 1980 (3)
