= Rimantas Plungė =

Lithuanian shot putter (born 1944)

Personal information
- Nationality: Lithuanian
- Born: 23 February 1944 (age 82) Panevėžys, Lithuania

Sport
- Sport: Athletics
- Event: Shot put

Rimantas Plungė (born 23 February 1944) is a Lithuanian athlete. He competed in the men's shot put at the 1972 Summer Olympics, representing the Soviet Union.
