= Heinz-Joachim Rothenburg =

East German shot putter

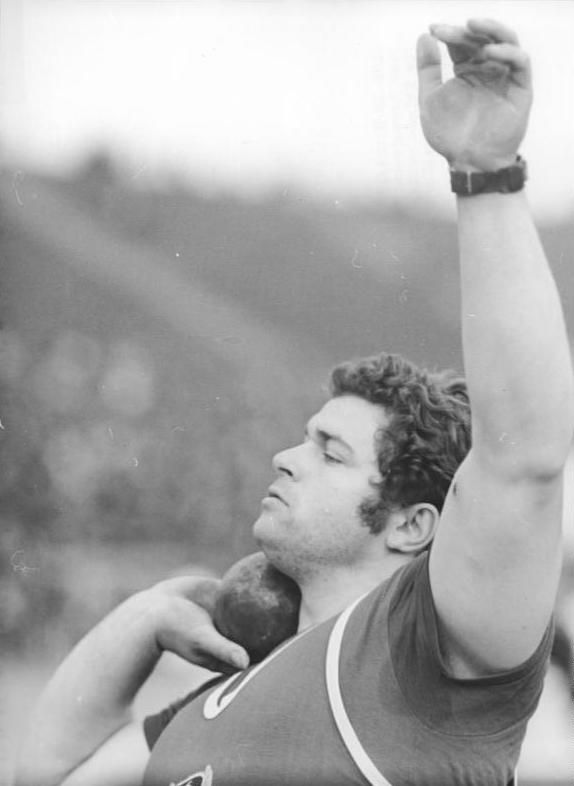
- Heinz-Joachim Rothenburg in 1971

Personal information
- Nationality: East Germany
- Born: April 9, 1944 (age 82) Luckenwalde, Brandenburg, Germany
- Height: 1.85 m (6 ft 1 in)
- Weight: 118 kg (260 lb)

Sport
- Country: East Germany
- Sport: Athletics
- Event: Shot put
- Club: SC Dynamo Berlin

Achievements and titles
- Personal best: 21.32 m (1972)
Medal record
Men's athletics
Representing East Germany
European Championships
Silver medal – second place	1969 Athens	Shot put
Silver medal – second place	1971 Helsinki	Shot put
European Indoor Championships
Silver medal – second place	1970 Vienna	Shot put
Silver medal – second place	1974 Gothenburg	Shot put

Heinz-Joachim Rothenburg (born 9 April 1944 in Luckenwalde, Brandenburg) is a retired East German shot putter.

He competed for the sports club SC Dynamo Berlin during his active career.

== Achievements ==
Year	Tournament	Venue	Result	Extra
1969	European Indoor Games	Belgrade, Yugoslavia	3rd	
1969	European Championships	Athens, Greece	2nd	
1970	European Indoor Championships	Vienna, Austria	2nd	
1971	European Indoor Championships	Sofia, Bulgaria	5th	
1971	European Championships	Helsinki, Finland	2nd	
1972	European Indoor Championships	Grenoble, France	4th	
1972	Olympic Games	Munich, West Germany	11th	
1974	European Indoor Championships	Gothenburg, Sweden	2nd	
