= Hartmut Briesenick =

East German athlete

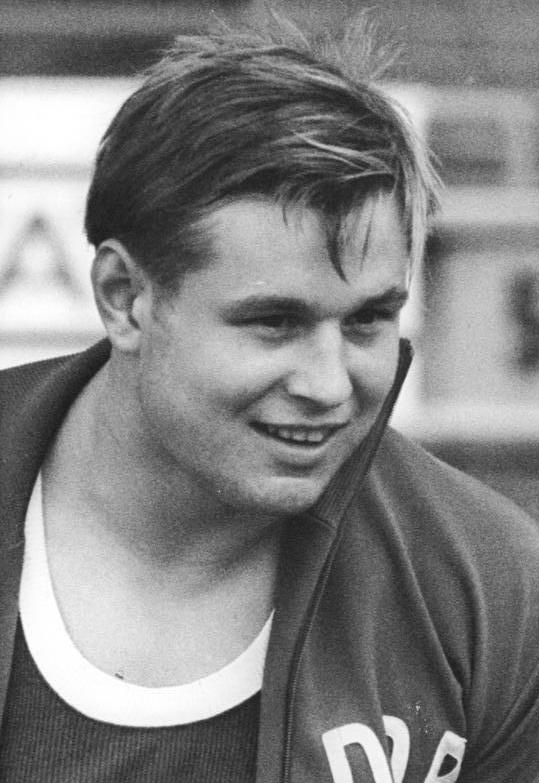
- Hartmut Briesenick (1968)

Personal information
- Full name: Hartmut Briesenick
- Nationality: East Germany
- Born: 17 March 1949 Luckenwalde, Brandenburg, Soviet occupation zone of Germany
- Died: 8 March 2013 (aged 63) Berlin, Germany
- Height: 1.91 m (6 ft 3 in)
- Weight: 116 kg (256 lb)
- Spouse: Ilona Slupianek

Sport
- Country: East Germany
- Sport: athletics
- Event: Shot put
- Club: SC Dynamo Berlin

Achievements and titles
- Personal best: 21.67 m (1973)
Medal record
Men's athletics
Representing East Germany
Olympic Games
Bronze medal – third place	1972 Munich	Shot put
European Championships
Gold medal – first place	1971 Helsinki	Shot put
Gold medal – first place	1974 Rome	Shot put
European Indoor Championships
Gold medal – first place	1970 Vienna	Shot put
Gold medal – first place	1971 Sofia	Shot put
Gold medal – first place	1972 Grenoble	Shot put
Summer Universiade
Gold medal – first place	1970 Turin	Shot put

Hartmut Briesenick (17 March 1949 – 8 March 2013) was an East German athlete who mainly competed in the men's shot put event.

Briesenick competed for East Germany at the 1972 Summer Olympics held in Munich, Germany where he won the bronze medal in the men's shot put event. His first marriage was with volleyball player Marion Riebel. He was then married to Ilona Slupianek, a fellow German shot-putter, from 1984 until they divorced before his death. He had a daughter with Slupianek.
