= Tomislav Šuker =

Croatian retired track and field athlete (born 1940)

Medal record

Men's athletics

Representing Yugoslavia

Mediterranean Games
Gold medal – first place	1967 Tunis	Shot Put

Tomislav Šuker (born 26 April 1940 in Livno) is a Croatian retired track and field athlete who competed for Yugoslavia. He won a gold medal in shot put at the 1967 Mediterranean Games.

Tomislav Šuker also won the Yugoslavian championship in shot put twice, 1967 and 1968.

== Life ==
Tomislav Šuker was born on 26 April 1940 in Livno, then in the Kingdom of Yugoslavia. He originated from the nearby village of Lištani. During the 1960s he moved to Osijek after being awarded an athletics scholarship, where he developed into one of Yugoslavia's leading shot putters. His personal best of 18.71 m was set in Sarajevo on 28 May 1966. He won the gold medal at the 1967 Mediterranean Games, was Yugoslav champion in 1967 and 1968, and competed in the final of the 1967 European Indoor Games.

He also competed in 1968 and 1966 European indoor games.

== Honours ==
Sport	Competition	Host city	Country	Event	Placement	Representing
Athletics	1966 Balkan Games (Balkan Athletics Championships)	Sarajevo	Yugoslavia	Shot put, men	1st place, gold medalist(s)	Yugoslavia
Athletics	1967 Mediterranean Games	Tunis	TUN	Shot put, men	1st place, gold medalist(s)	Yugoslavia
Athletics	1967 Balkan Games (Balkan Athletics Championships)	İstanbul	TUR	Shot put, men	1st place, gold medalist(s)	Yugoslavia
Athletics	1968 Balkan Games (Balkan Athletics Championships)	Athens	GRE	Shot put, men	(gold)	Yugoslavia

== Personal life ==
Tomislav Šuker is father of Davor Šuker, one of the greatest Croatian footballers of all time.

== See also ==
- Yugoslavia at the 1967 Mediterranean Games
