= Yevgeniy Mironov =

Soviet shot putter

Olympic medal record

Men's athletics
Silver medal – second place	1976 Montreal	Shot put

Yevgeniy Vasilyevich Mironov (Russian: Евге́ний Васлъевич Миро́нов) (born 1 November 1949) was a Soviet athlete who competed mainly in the Shot Put. He trained at Burevestnik in Leningrad.

He competed for the USSR in the 1976 Summer Olympics held in Montreal, Canada in the Shot Put where he won the silver medal.
