= Bjørn Bang Andersen =

Norwegian shot putter

Personal information
- Nationality: Norwegian
- Born: 14 November 1937 (age 88)
- Height: 184 cm (6 ft 0 in)
- Weight: 107 kg (236 lb)

Sport
- Sport: Athletics
- Event: shot put
- Club: IL i BUL

Bjørn Arnold Dagfinn Bang Andersen (born 14 November 1937) is a former Norwegian shot putter.

== Biography ==
He finished ninth at the 1966 European Championships with a throw of 17.84 metres. In addition he competed at the European Championships in 1962 and 1971 without reaching the finals. He never participated in the Summer Olympics. He became Norwegian champion in the years 1961-1966, 1968 and 1970-1974.

Andersen finished second behind Vilmos Varjú in the shot put event at the British 1965 AAA Championships.

His career best throw was 19.29 metres, achieved in August 1972 at Stavanger stadion. This places him ninth among Norwegian shot putters.
