= Traugott Glöckler =

German shot putter

Personal information
- Nationality: German
- Born: 12 January 1944 (age 82) Gochsheim, Baden-Württemberg, West Germany

Sport
- Sport: Athletics
- Event: Shot put
Medal record
Representing West Germany
Summer Universiade
Silver medal – second place	1967 Tokyo	Shot put

Traugott Glöckler (born 12 January 1944) is a German athlete. He competed in the men's shot put at the 1968 Summer Olympics.
