= Reijo Ståhlberg =

Finnish shot putter

Personal information
- Born: 21 September 1952 (age 73) Ekenäs, Finland

Sport
- Sport: Track and field
Medal record
Representing Finland
European Indoor Championships
Gold medal – first place	1978 Milan	Shot put
Gold medal – first place	1979 Vienna	Shot put
Gold medal – first place	1981 Grenoble	Shot put
Summer Universiade
Silver medal – second place	1979 Mexico City	Shot put

Reijo Einar Ståhlberg (born 21 September 1952) is a 194 cm former Finnish shot putter whose competitive weight was 128 kg. He holds the Finnish shot put record of 21.69 meters and represented Finland in the 1976 and 1980 Olympics, placing 11th and 4th respectively. In the European Championships of 1974, he came in 11th, in 1978 4th, and in 1982 9th. He also won nine Finnish national championships and 3 European Indoor Championships in 1978, 1979 and 1981. The fourth Finn to put the shot 20 meters or more, Ståhlberg has been president of the Finnish 20 meter club since its inception in 1983.
