= Edy Hubacher =

Swiss bobsledder and athlete (born 1940)

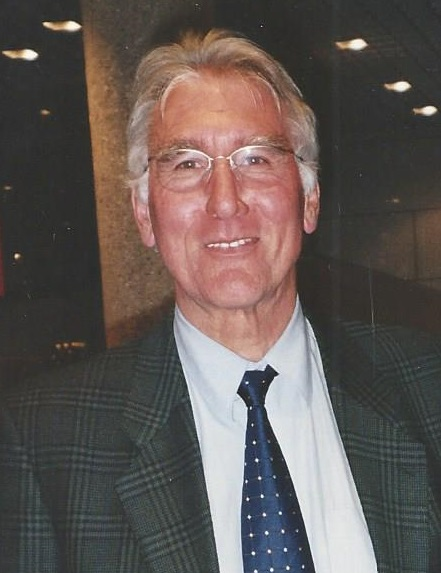

Personal information
- Full name: Eduard Hubacher
- Nationality: Switzerland
- Born: 15 April 1940 (age 86) Bern, Switzerland
- Height: 6 ft 7 in (201 cm)
- Weight: 231 lb (105 kg)

Sport
- Sport: Athletics; Bobsleigh
- Events: Shot put, Discus throw, Decathlon; Two-man, Four-man
- Club: TV Länggasse Bern

Achievements and titles
- Personal bests: Shot put: 19.34 m (1970); Discus throw: 56.78 m (1970); Decathlon: 7,405 pts (1969)
Medal record
Men's bobsleigh
Representing Switzerland
Olympic Games
Gold medal – first place	1972 Sapporo	Four-man
Bronze medal – third place	1972 Sapporo	Two-man
European Championships
Bronze medal – third place	1972 St. Moritz	Two-man

Eduard "Edy" Hubacher (born 15 April 1940) is a former Swiss sportsman who competed at both the Summer and Winter Olympics.

In the 1960s, he competed in the shot put, discus throw, and decathlon, and still holds the decathlon best in the shot put. In the 1970s, he switched to bobsledding, winning a gold medal in the four-man and a bronze medal in the two-man events at the 1972 Winter Olympics.

== Personal bests ==
Individual events
Event	Performance	Location	Date	Ref.
Shot put	19.34 m (63 ft 5 1/4 in)	Olsztyn	22 August 1970	
Discus throw	56.78 m (186 ft 3 1/4 in)	Bern	22 August 1970	

Combined events
Event	Performance	Location	Date	Score	Ref.
Decathlon	—N/a	Bern	4–5 October 1969	7,393 points	^{[a]}
100 meters	10.80	Bern	4 October 1969	906 points	
Long jump	7.12 m (23 ft 4 1/4 in)	Bern	4 October 1969	842 points	
Shot put	19.17 m (62 ft 10 1/2 in)^{[b]}	Bern	4 October 1969	1,048 points	
High jump	1.80 m (5 ft 10 3/4 in)	Lyon	3 October 1970	627 points	
400 meters	50.30	Bern	4 October 1969	801 points	
110m hurdles	15.00	Bern	5 October 1969	850 points	
Discus throw	52.40 m (171 ft 10 3/4 in)	Lyon	4 October 1970	920 points	
Pole vault	3.40 m (11 ft 1 3/4 in)	Lyon	4 October 1970	457 points	
Javelin throw	53.22 m (174 ft 7 1/4 in)	Bern	5 October 1969	636 points	
1500 meters	5:02.10	Bern	5 October 1969	548 points	
Virtual Best Performance				7,631 points	—N/a

^{a} Originally scored as 7,405 points
^{b} Decathlon best
