= Dieter Hoffmann (athlete) =

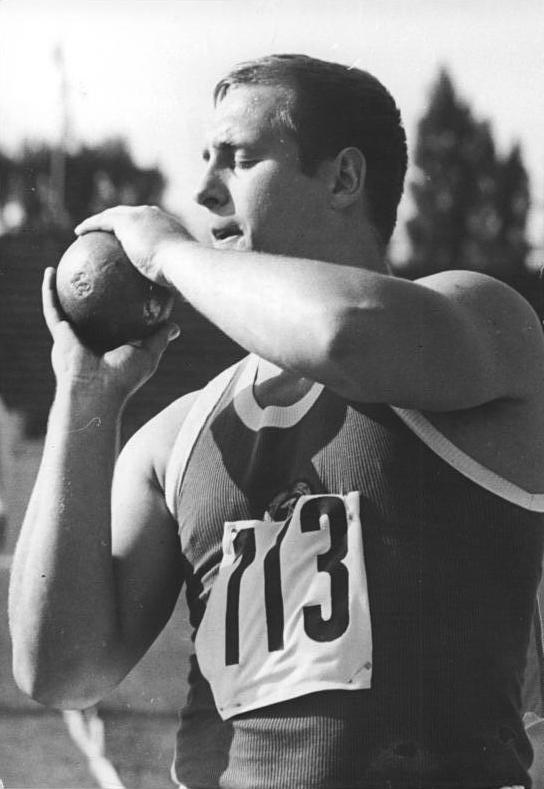
- Dieter Hoffmann

Medal record

Men's athletics

Representing East Germany

European Championships
| Gold medal – first place | 1969 Athens | Shot put |

Dieter Hoffmann (27 August 1941 – 16 September 2016) was a German former athlete who competed in the 1964 Summer Olympics and in the 1968 Summer Olympics. He was born in Danzig and died in Luckenwalde.
