= Anatoliy Yarosh =

Ukrainian shot putter

Personal information
- Nationality: Ukrainian
- Born: 25 October 1952 (age 73) Perevalsk, Voroshylovhrad Oblast, Ukrainian SSR, Soviet Union (now Ukraine)

Sport
- Sport: Athletics
- Event: Shot put
Medal record
Representing Soviet Union
Summer Universiade
Silver medal – second place	1975 Rome	Shot put

Anatoliy Petrovich Yarosh (born 25 October 1952) is a Ukrainian athlete. He competed in the men's shot put at the 1980 Summer Olympics, representing the Soviet Union.
