= Ralf Reichenbach =

German shot putter (1950–1998)

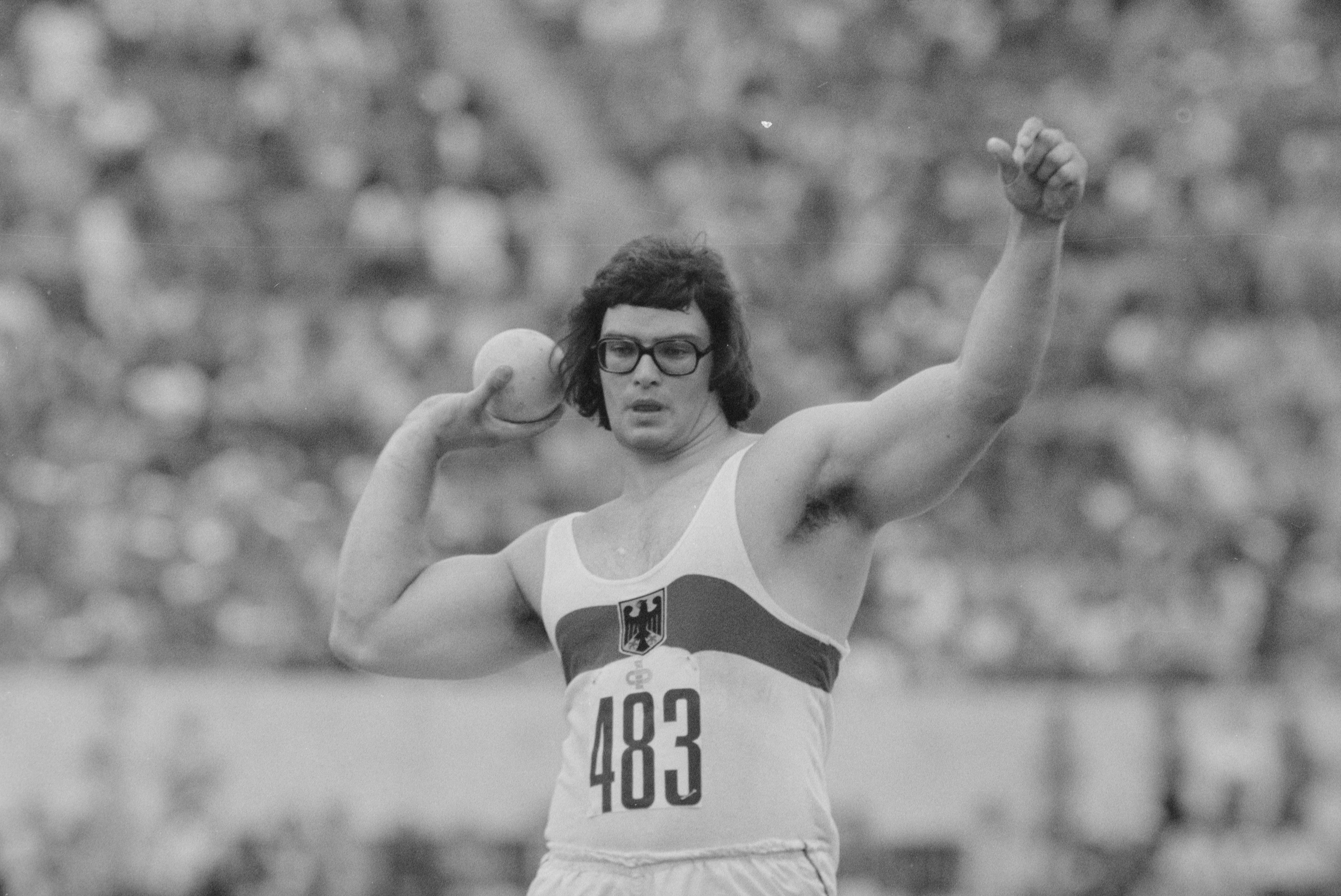
- Reichenbach in 1974

Personal information
- Born: 31 July 1950 Wiesbaden, West Germany
- Died: 12 February 1998 (aged 47) Berlin, Germany

Sport
- Country: West Germany
- Sport: Shot put
Medal record
Men's athletics
Representing West Germany
European Championships
Silver medal – second place	1974 Rome	Shot put

Ralf Reichenbach (31 July 1950 – 12 February 1998) was a German shot putter. He represented West Germany and competed for the club OSC Berlin and LG Süd Berlin during his active career. He competed in the men's shot put at the 1972 Summer Olympics and the 1976 Summer Olympics.

== Achievements ==
Year	Tournament	Venue	Result	Extra
1971	European Indoor Championships	Sofia, Bulgaria	6th	
1971	European Championships	Helsinki, Finland	11th	
1972	Olympic Games	Munich, West Germany	13th	
1974	European Championships	Rome, Italy	2nd	
1977	European Indoor Championships	San Sebastián, Spain	6th	
