= Jaromír Vlk =

Czechoslovak shot putter

Personal information
- Nationality: Czech
- Born: 4 March 1949 (age 77) Teplice nad Bečvou, Czechoslovakia

Sport
- Sport: Athletics
- Event: Shot put
Medal record
Men's athletics
Representing Czechoslovakia
European Indoor Championships
Silver medal – second place	1980 Sindelfingen	Shot put
Bronze medal – third place	1973 Rotterdam	Shot put

Jaromír Vlk (born 4 March 1949) is a Czech former athlete. He competed in the men's shot put at the 1972 Summer Olympics and the 1980 Summer Olympics.
