= Matti Yrjölä =

Personal information
- Born: March 26, 1938 (age 88) Hämeenkyrö, Finland

Sport
- Sport: Track and field

Matti Manu Ilmari Yrjölä (born March 26, 1938) is a 192 cm tall Finnish shot putter, who represented Kyröskosken Ponsi and weighed 121 kg when competing. He was the second Finn to put the shot more than 20 m in an official competition when he put it 20.04 metres in Hämeenkyrö, Finland on August 2, 1972.

His personal best outdoors is 20.84 m, which he put on July 6, 1976, in Kokemäki. His personal best indoors of 19.12 m, which he put in Turku on February 25, 1973, was enough to win him the Finnish Championships that year. Internationally, his highest rankings in the European Championships was a fourth place in Athens in 1969 and a 3rd place in the competition between Finland and Sweden in 1973.

Yrjölä came from an athletic family: both his father (Paavo Yrjölä) and his uncle (Iivari Yrjölä) competed in the decathlon.

Yrjölä was one of the first six Finns originally admitted to the 20 meter club when it was founded in April 1983.
