= Heinfried Birlenbach =

German shot putter (1940–2020)

Heinfried Birlenbach (May 24, 1940 – November 11, 2020) was a West German shot putter. He was born in Siegen.

Birlenbach finished fifth at the 1966 European Championships, eighth at the 1968 Summer Olympics and seventh at the 1972 Summer Olympics, the latter in a career best throw of 20.37 metres. This places him 26th on the German all-time list. He also won the 1968 and 1969 European Indoor Games, the latter in a new championship record of 19.51 metres. He became German champion six consecutive seasons: 1966 - 1971. He competed for the sports club Sportfreunde Siegen during his active career.
