= Nikolay Karasyov (shot putter) =

Personal information
- Born: 29 November 1939 (age 86) Moscow, Russian SFSR, Soviet Union
- Height: 1.82 m (6 ft 0 in)
- Weight: 115 kg (254 lb)

Sport
- Sport: Athletics
- Event: Shot put

Achievements and titles
- Personal best: 19.74 m (1970)
Medal record
Men's athletics
Representing the Soviet Union
European Championships
Silver medal – second place	1966 Budapest	Shot put
European Indoor Games
Gold medal – first place	1967 Prague	Shot put
Bronze medal – third place	1968 Madrid	Shot put

Nikolay Karasyov (Russian: Николай Карасёв; born 29 November 1939) is a retired Russian shot putter. He competed at the 1964 Summer Olympics and finished in sixth place. He won a silver medal at the 1966 European Athletics Championships and was the gold medallist at the 1967 European Indoor Games. He had a personal best of 19.74 m (64 ft 9 in), set in 1970.
