= Valcho Stoev =

Bulgarian shot putter (born 1952)

Personal information
- Born: 20 January 1952 (age 74) Ovcharovo, Haskovo Province, Bulgaria

Sport
- Sport: Track and field
Medal record
Representing Bulgaria
European Indoor Championships
Gold medal – first place	1975 Katowice	Shot put
Summer Universiade
Gold medal – first place	1977 Sofia	Shot put
Bronze medal – third place	1975 Rome	Shot put

Valcho Stoev Khristov (Bulgarian: Вълчо Стоев Христов; born 20 January 1952) is a Bulgarian former shot putter who competed in the 1980 Summer Olympics.

He was a gold medallist at the 1975 European Athletics Indoor Championships and the 1977 Universiade. He also won a bronze medal at the 1975 Universiade and was a finalist at the European Athletics Championships in 1974 and 1978, finishing ninth both times. He was a six-time champion at the Balkan Games between 1973 and 1980.

Before taking his European indoor title, he had finished sixth in 1975 and fourth in 1976. He finished his career with a personal best of 20.72 m (67 ft 11 1/2 in) He was a four-time national champion indoors and a five-time champion outdoors (mostly finishing behind Nikolai Khristov).
