= Vilmos Varjú =

Hungarian shot putter

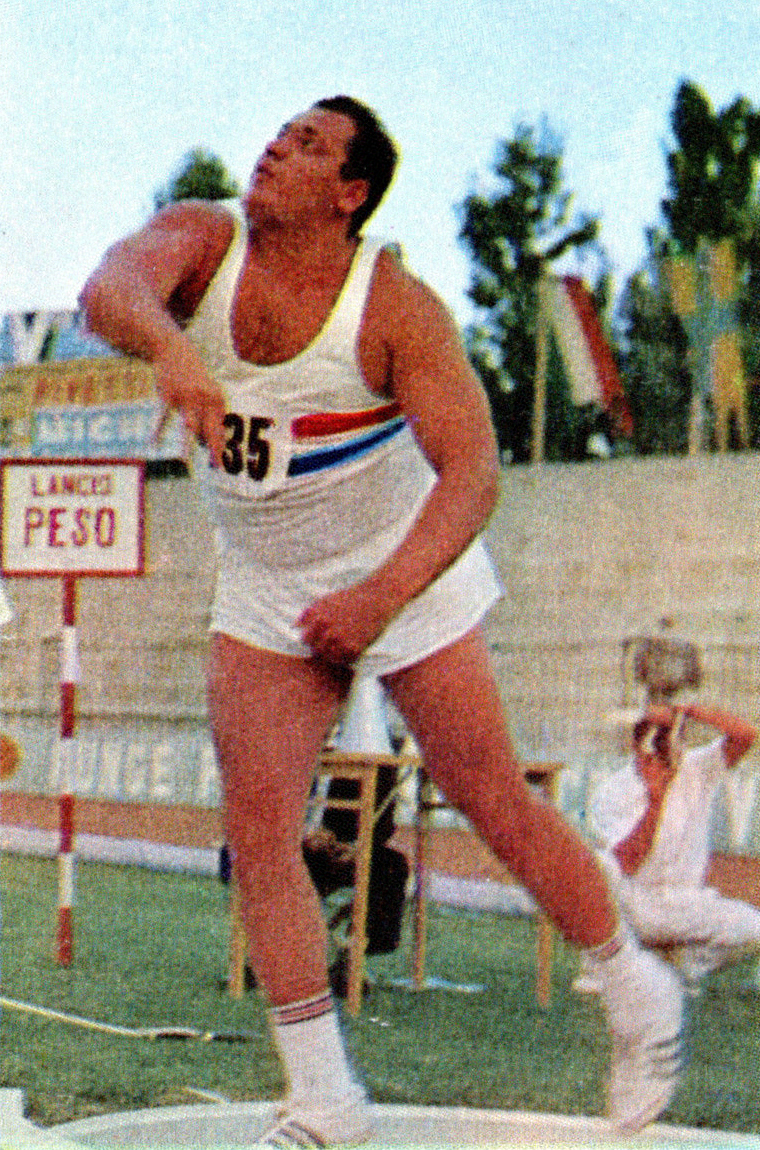

Personal information
- Nationality: Hungarian
- Born: 10 June 1937 Gyula, Hungary
- Died: 17 February 1994 (aged 56) Budapest, Hungary
- Height: 1.89 m (6 ft 2 in)
- Weight: 140 kg (309 lb)

Sport
- Sport: Athletics
- Event: Shot put
- Club: Újpesti TE, Budapest

Achievements and titles
- Personal best: 20.45 m (1971)
Medal record
Men's athletics
Representing Hungary
Olympic Games
Bronze medal – third place	1964 Tokyo	Shot put
European Championships
Gold medal – first place	1962 Belgrade	Shot put
Gold medal – first place	1966 Budapest	Shot put

Vilmos Varjú (Hungarian pronunciation: [ˈvilmoʃ ˈvɒrjuː]; 10 June 1937 – 17 February 1994) was a Hungarian shot putter. He competed at the 1964, 1968 and 1972 Olympics and finished in 3rd, 13th and 8th place, respectively.

Varjú won European titles in 1962 and 1966 and won the British AAA Championships title at the 1964 AAA Championships and 1965 AAA Championships.
