= Eduard Gushchin =

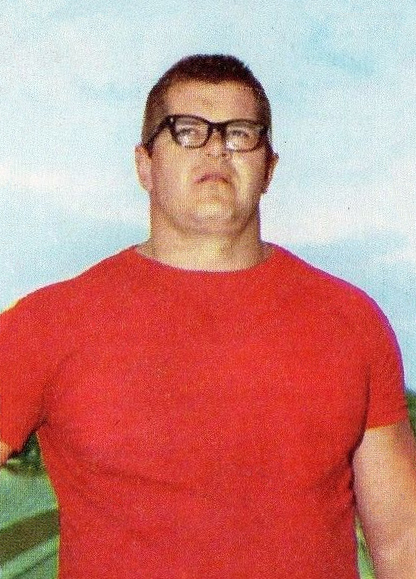

Personal information
- Born: 27 July 1940 Motygino, Krasnoyarsk Krai, Russian SFSR, Soviet Union
- Died: 14 March 2011 (aged 70) Moscow, Russia
- Height: 1.92 m (6 ft 4 in)
- Weight: 126 kg (278 lb)

Sport
- Sport: Athletics
- Event: Shot put
- Club: Trud Moscow Oblast

Achievements and titles
- Personal best: 20.28 m (1968)
Medal record
Representing Soviet Union
Summer Olympics
Bronze medal – third place	1968 Mexico City	Shot put
European Indoor Championships
Silver medal – second place	1967 Prague	Shot put
Summer Universiade
Bronze medal – third place	1965 Budapest	Shot put

Eduard Viktorovich Gushchin (Russian: Эдуард Викторович Гущин; 27 July 1940 – 14 March 2011) was a Soviet athlete who competed mainly in the shot put. His career was highlighted by an Olympic bronze medal in 1968 and he was also a two-time national champion. He was noted for wearing dark-rimmed spectacles.

Gushchin was born in Krasnoyarsk Krai, but later moved to Moscow Oblast, gaining honours as a Master of Sports of the USSR, International Class. He made his international debut for the Soviet Union in 1965 at that year's Summer Universiade and he was the bronze medallist in the shot put, an event which was won by 1964 Olympic runner-up Randy Matson. He threw 18.23 m in the qualifying rounds of the 1966 European Athletics Championships, but did not perform as well in the final, ending the competition in 12th place. The following year he competed at the 1967 European Indoor Games and claimed the silver medal with a throw of 18.96 m, losing to the reigning USSR champion Nikolay Karasyov.

Gushchi reached the peak of his career in 1968, beginning with a national shot put title outdoors with a put of 19.60 m. This brought him selection for the event at the 1968 Summer Olympics in Mexico City. At the competition he broke the Soviet record with his first throw in the final, recording 20.09 m to become the first Soviet man to clear the twenty metre mark. This feat brought him the Olympic bronze medal behind Americans Matson and George Woods. He could not repeat this performance later, managing only sixth place at the 1969 European Athletics Championships. He took a second Soviet shot put national title in 1970.

In retirement Gushchi worked in the athletics department of the USSR Sports Committee and also as a physiotherapist. He died on 14 March 2011 in Moscow at the age of 70.
