= Yves Brouzet =

French shot putter

Personal information
- Born: 5 September 1948 Béziers, France
- Died: 9 May 2003 (aged 54) Grenoble, France

Sport
- Sport: Track and field
Medal record
Representing France
Mediterranean Games
| Bronze medal – third place | 1971 Izmir | Shot put |

Yves Brouzet (5 September 1948 – 9 May 2003) was a French shot putter.

== Biography ==
Brouzet was born in Béziers, and represented the clubs Stade Français and Grenoble UC. He finished fourth at the 1970 European Indoor Championships, fourteenth at the 1971 European Indoor Championships, eighth at the 1971 European Championships, won the bronze medal at the 1971 Mediterranean Games, finished fifth at the 1972 European Indoor Championships, and twelfth at the 1972 Olympic Games.

He then finished sixth at the 1976 European Indoor Championships eleventh at the 1981 European Indoor Championships, and eighth at the 1982 European Indoor Championships. He competed at the 1976 Olympic Games without reaching the final. He became French champion in 1972, 1973, 1975 and 1976, and French indoor champion in 1972, 1973, 1974, 1976, 1980 and 1982. His personal best put was 20.20 metres, achieved in July 1973 in Colombes.
