= Pierre Colnard =

French shot putter

Medal record

Men's athletics

European Indoor Championships
Bronze medal – third place	1970 Vienna	Shot put

Pierre Colnard (18 February 1929 – 30 March 2018) was a French shot putter.

He was born in Liffol-le-Petit, and represented the club Union Sportive Nemours. He finished seventh at the 1966 European Championships, seventh at the 1968 European Indoor Games, ninth at the 1968 Olympic Games, and fifth at the 1969 European Championships, won the bronze medal at the 1970 European Indoor Championships, and seventh at the 1971 European Indoor Championships. He became French champion in 1960, 1961, 1963, 1965, 1966, 1967, 1969 and 1970.

Colnard was the first Frenchman to throw pas the 17 metre mark (1961) and past the 18 metre mark (1965). His personal best was 19.77 metres, achieved in 1970.
