= Shot put at the World Athletics Championships =

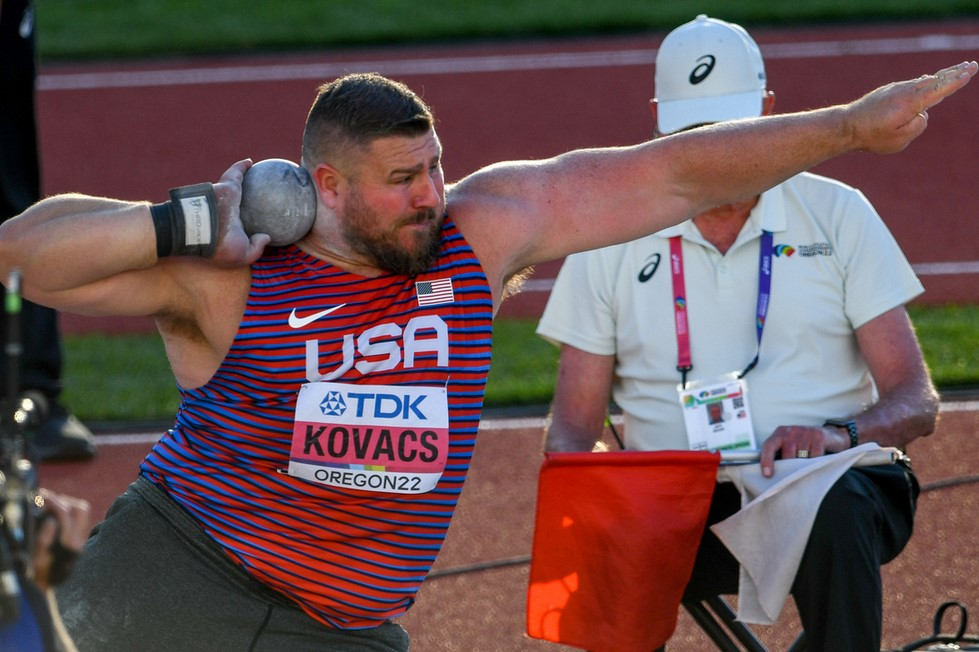
- Joe Kovacs competing at the 2022 Championships.

Overview
- Gender: Men and women
- Years held: Men: 1983 – 2025; Women: 1983 – 2025

Championship record
- Men: 23.51 m Ryan Crouser (2023)
- Women: 21.24 m Natalya Lisovskaya (1987); Valerie Adams (2011)

Reigning champion
- Men: Ryan Crouser (USA)
- Women: Jessica Schilder (NED)

The shot put at the World Championships in Athletics has been contested by both men and women since the inaugural edition in 1983.

The most successful nation in the event has been the United States, having won 13 gold medals and 30 medals in total. Germany is the second-most successful nation, having won 6 gold medals and 20 medals in total.

Valerie Adams is the most successful athlete in the event, having won 4 gold medals and one silver medal. Gong Lijiao is the most decorated athlete in the event, having won a total of 8 medals in total between 2009 and 2023, more than any athlete has won in a single individual event. The most successful athletes on the men's side are John Godina and Werner Günthör, who have won 3 gold medals each. Joe Kovacs is the most decorated athlete on the men's side, with 5 medals in total.

The current championship records are 23.51 m for men, set by Ryan Crouser in 2023, and 21.24 m for women, set by Natalya Lisovskaya in 1987 and tied by Valerie Adams in 2011.

The reigning world champions are Ryan Crouser and Chase Ealey, both from the United States.

== Age records ==
All information from World Athletics.

| Distinction | Male | | | Female | | |
| Distinction | Athlete | Age | Date | Athlete | Age | Date |
|---|---|---|---|---|---|---|
| Youngest champion | David Storl (GER) | 21 years, 37 days | 2 Sep 2011 | Valerie Vili (NZL) | 22 years, 324 days | 26 Aug 2007 |
| Youngest medalist | Ulf Timmermann (GDR) | 20 years, 279 days | 7 Aug 1983 | Gong Lijiao (CHN) | 20 years, 204 days | 16 Aug 2009 |
| Youngest finalist | Manuel Martínez (ESP) | 18 years, 257 days | 21 Aug 1993 | Gong Lijiao (CHN) | 18 years, 214 days | 26 Aug 2007 |
| Youngest participant | Konrad Bukowiecki (POL) | 18 years, 159 days | 23 Aug 2015 | Emel Dereli (TUR) | 17 years, 167 days | 11 Aug 2013 |
| Oldest champion | Werner Günthör (SUI) | 32 years, 81 days | 21 Aug 1993 | Svetlana Krivelyova (RUS) | 34 years, 75 days | 27 Aug 2003 |
| Oldest medalist | Oliver-Sven Buder (GER) | 33 years, 59 days | 21 Aug 1999 | Vita Pavlysh (UKR) | 34 years, 224 days | 27 Aug 2003 |
| Oldest finalist | Ivan Ivančić (YUG) | 44 years, 244 days | 7 Aug 1983 | Li Meisu (CHN) | 38 years, 112 days | 7 Aug 1997 |
| Oldest participant | Ivan Ivančić (YUG) | 44 years, 244 days | 7 Aug 1983 | Judy Oakes (GBR) | 39 years, 172 days | 5 Aug 1997 |

== Medalists ==
=== Men ===
| Championships | Gold | Silver | Bronze |
|---|---|---|---|
| 1983 Helsinki | Edward Sarul (POL) | Ulf Timmermann (GDR) | Remigius Machura (TCH) |
| 1987 Rome | Werner Günthör (SUI) | Alessandro Andrei (ITA) | John Brenner (USA) |
| 1991 Tokyo | Werner Günthör (SUI) | Lars Arvid Nilsen (NOR) | Aleksandr Klimenko (URS) |
| 1993 Stuttgart | Werner Günthör (SUI) | Randy Barnes (USA) | Oleksandr Bagach (UKR) |
| 1995 Gothenburg | John Godina (USA) | Mika Halvari (FIN) | Randy Barnes (USA) |
| 1997 Athens | John Godina (USA) | Oliver-Sven Buder (GER) | C. J. Hunter (USA) |
| 1999 Seville | C. J. Hunter (USA) | Oliver-Sven Buder (GER) | Oleksandr Bagach (UKR) |
| 2001 Edmonton | John Godina (USA) | Adam Nelson (USA) | Arsi Harju (FIN) |
| 2003 Saint-Denis | Andrei Mikhnevich (BLR) | Adam Nelson (USA) | Yuriy Bilonoh (UKR) |
| 2005 Helsinki | Adam Nelson (USA) | Rutger Smith (NED) | Ralf Bartels (GER) |
| 2007 Osaka | Reese Hoffa (USA) | Adam Nelson (USA) | Rutger Smith (NED) |
| 2009 Berlin | Christian Cantwell (USA) | Tomasz Majewski (POL) | Ralf Bartels (GER) |
| 2011 Daegu | David Storl (GER) | Dylan Armstrong (CAN) | Christian Cantwell (USA) |
| 2013 Moscow | David Storl (GER) | Ryan Whiting (USA) | Dylan Armstrong (CAN) |
| 2015 Beijing | Joe Kovacs (USA) | David Storl (GER) | O'Dayne Richards (JAM) |
| 2017 London | Tom Walsh (NZL) | Joe Kovacs (USA) | Stipe Žunić (CRO) |
| 2019 Doha | Joe Kovacs (USA) | Ryan Crouser (USA) | Tom Walsh (NZL) |
| 2022 Eugene | Ryan Crouser (USA) | Joe Kovacs (USA) | Josh Awotunde (USA) |
| 2023 Budapest | Ryan Crouser (USA) | Leonardo Fabbri (ITA) | Joe Kovacs (USA) |
| 2025 Tokyo | Ryan Crouser (USA) | Uziel Muñoz (MEX) | Leonardo Fabbri (ITA) |

==== Multiple medalists ====
| Rank | Athlete | Nation | Period | Gold | Silver | Bronze | Total |
|---|---|---|---|---|---|---|---|
| 1 | Ryan Crouser | United States (USA) | 2019-2025 | 3 | 1 | 0 | 4 |
| 2 | John Godina | United States (USA) | 1995-2001 | 3 | 0 | 0 | 3 |
| 2 | Werner Günthör | Switzerland (SUI) | 1987-1993 | 3 | 0 | 0 | 3 |
| 4 | Joe Kovacs | United States (USA) | 2015-2023 | 2 | 2 | 1 | 5 |
| 5 | David Storl | Germany (GER) | 2011-2015 | 2 | 1 | 0 | 3 |
| 6 | Adam Nelson | United States (USA) | 2001-2007 | 1 | 3 | 0 | 4 |
| 7 | Christian Cantwell | United States (USA) | 2009-2011 | 1 | 0 | 1 | 2 |
| 7 | C. J. Hunter | United States (USA) | 1997-1999 | 1 | 0 | 1 | 2 |
| 7 | Tom Walsh | New Zealand (NZL) | 2017-2019 | 1 | 0 | 1 | 2 |
| 10 | Oliver-Sven Buder | Germany (GER) | 1997-1999 | 0 | 2 | 0 | 2 |
| 11 | Dylan Armstrong | Canada (CAN) | 2011-2013 | 0 | 1 | 1 | 2 |
| 11 | Randy Barnes | United States (USA) | 1993-1995 | 0 | 1 | 1 | 2 |
| 11 | Rutger Smith | Netherlands (NED) | 2005-2007 | 0 | 1 | 1 | 2 |
| 11 | Leonardo Fabbri | Italy (ITA) | 2023-2025 | 0 | 1 | 1 | 2 |
| 15 | Oleksandr Bagach | Ukraine (UKR) | 1993-1999 | 0 | 0 | 2 | 2 |
| 15 | Ralf Bartels | Germany (GER) | 2005-2009 | 0 | 0 | 2 | 2 |

==== Medals by country ====
| Rank | Nation | Gold | Silver | Bronze | Total |
|---|---|---|---|---|---|
| 1 | United States (USA) | 12 | 8 | 6 | 26 |
| 2 | Switzerland (SUI) | 3 | 0 | 0 | 3 |
| 3 | Germany (GER) | 2 | 3 | 2 | 7 |
| 4 | Ukraine (UKR) | 0 | 0 | 3 | 3 |
| 5 | New Zealand (NZL) | 1 | 0 | 1 | 2 |
| 5 | Poland (POL) | 1 | 1 | 0 | 2 |
| 7 | Canada (CAN) | 0 | 1 | 1 | 2 |
| 7 | Finland (FIN) | 0 | 1 | 1 | 2 |
| 7 | Netherlands (NED) | 0 | 1 | 1 | 2 |
| 10 | Belarus (BLR) | 1 | 0 | 0 | 1 |
| 11 | East Germany (GDR) | 0 | 1 | 0 | 1 |
| 11 | Italy (ITA) | 0 | 2 | 1 | 3 |
| 11 | Norway (NOR) | 0 | 1 | 0 | 1 |
| | Mexico (MEX) | 0 | 1 | 0 | 1 |
| 14 | Croatia (CRO) | 0 | 0 | 1 | 1 |
| 14 | Czechoslovakia (TCH) | 0 | 0 | 1 | 1 |
| 14 | Jamaica (JAM) | 0 | 0 | 1 | 1 |
| 14 | Soviet Union (URS) | 0 | 0 | 1 | 1 |

=== Women ===
| Championships | Gold | Silver | Bronze |
|---|---|---|---|
| 1983 Helsinki | Helena Fibingerová (TCH) | Helma Knorscheidt (GDR) | Ilona Schoknecht-Slupianek (GDR) |
| 1987 Rome | Natalya Lisovskaya (URS) | Kathrin Neimke (GDR) | Ines Müller (GDR) |
| 1991 Tokyo | Huang Zhihong (CHN) | Natalya Lisovskaya (URS) | Svetlana Krivelyova (URS) |
| 1993 Stuttgart | Huang Zhihong (CHN) | Svetlana Krivelyova (RUS) | Kathrin Neimke (GER) |
| 1995 Gothenburg | Astrid Kumbernuss (GER) | Huang Zhihong (CHN) | Svetla Mitkova (BUL) |
| 1997 Athens | Astrid Kumbernuss (GER) | Vita Pavlysh (UKR) | Stephanie Storp (GER) |
| 1999 Seville | Astrid Kumbernuss (GER) | Nadine Kleinert (GER) | Svetlana Krivelyova (RUS) |
| 2001 Edmonton | Yanina Karolchik (BLR) | Nadine Kleinert (GER) | Vita Pavlysh (UKR) |
| 2003 Saint-Denis | Svetlana Krivelyova (RUS) | Nadzeya Ostapchuk (BLR) | Vita Pavlysh (UKR) |
| 2005 Helsinki | Olga Ryabinkina (RUS) | Valerie Vili (NZL) | Nadine Kleinert (GER) |
| 2007 Osaka | Valerie Vili (NZL) | Nadine Kleinert (GER) | Li Ling (CHN) |
| 2009 Berlin | Valerie Vili (NZL) | Nadine Kleinert (GER) | Gong Lijiao (CHN) |
| 2011 Daegu | Valerie Adams (NZL) | Jillian Camarena-Williams (USA) | Gong Lijiao (CHN) |
| 2013 Moscow | Valerie Adams (NZL) | Christina Schwanitz (GER) | Gong Lijiao (CHN) |
| 2015 Beijing | Christina Schwanitz (GER) | Gong Lijiao (CHN) | Michelle Carter (USA) |
| 2017 London | Gong Lijiao (CHN) | Anita Márton (HUN) | Michelle Carter (USA) |
| 2019 Doha | Gong Lijiao (CHN) | Danniel Thomas-Dodd (JAM) | Christina Schwanitz (GER) |
| 2022 Eugene | Chase Ealey (USA) | Gong Lijiao (CHN) | Jessica Schilder (NED) |
| 2023 Budapest | Chase Ealey (USA) | Sarah Mitton (CAN) | Gong Lijiao (CHN) |
| 2025 Tokyo | Jessica Schilder (NED) | Chase Jackson (USA) | Maddison-Lee Wesche (NZL) |

==== Multiple medalists ====
| Rank | Athlete | Nation | Period | Gold | Silver | Bronze | Total |
|---|---|---|---|---|---|---|---|
| 1 | Valerie Adams | New Zealand (NZL) | 2005-2013 | 4 | 1 | 0 | 5 |
| 2 | Astrid Kumbernuss | Germany (GER) | 1995-1999 | 3 | 0 | 0 | 3 |
| 3 | Gong Lijao | China (CHN) | 2009-2023 | 2 | 2 | 4 | 8 |
| 4 | Huang Zhihong | China (CHN) | 1991-1995 | 2 | 1 | 0 | 3 |
| 4 | Chase Ealey | United States (USA) | 2022-2023 | 2 | 1 | 0 | 3 |
| 6 | Svetlana Krivelyova | Russia (RUS); Soviet Union (URS) | 1991-2003 | 1 | 1 | 2 | 4 |
| 7 | Christina Schwanitz | Germany (GER) | 2013-2019 | 1 | 1 | 1 | 3 |
| 8 | Natalya Lisovskaya | Soviet Union (URS) | 1987-1991 | 1 | 1 | 0 | 2 |
| 9 | Jessica Schilder | Netherlands (NED) | 2022-2025 | 1 | 0 | 1 | 2 |
| 10 | Nadine Kleinert | Germany (GER) | 1999-2009 | 0 | 4 | 1 | 5 |
| 11 | Vita Pavlysh | Ukraine (UKR) | 1997-2003 | 0 | 1 | 2 | 3 |
| 12 | Michelle Carter | United States (USA) | 2015-2017 | 0 | 0 | 2 | 2 |

==== Medals by country ====
| Rank | Nation | Gold | Silver | Bronze | Total |
|---|---|---|---|---|---|
| 1 | Germany (GER) | 4 | 5 | 4 | 13 |
| 2 | China (CHN) | 4 | 3 | 5 | 12 |
| 3 | New Zealand (NZL) | 4 | 1 | 1 | 6 |
| 4 | United States (USA) | 2 | 2 | 2 | 6 |
| 5 | Russia (RUS) | 2 | 1 | 1 | 4 |
| 6 | Soviet Union (URS) | 1 | 1 | 1 | 3 |
| 7 | Belarus (BLR) | 1 | 1 | 0 | 4 |
| 8 | Netherlands (NED) | 1 | 0 | 1 | 2 |
| 9 | Czechoslovakia (TCH) | 1 | 0 | 0 | 1 |
| 10 | East Germany (GDR) | 0 | 2 | 2 | 4 |
| 11 | Ukraine (UKR) | 0 | 1 | 2 | 3 |
| 12 | Canada (CAN) | 0 | 1 | 0 | 1 |
| 12 | Hungary (HUN) | 0 | 1 | 0 | 1 |
| 12 | Jamaica (JAM) | 0 | 1 | 0 | 1 |
| 15 | Bulgaria (BUL) | 0 | 0 | 1 | 1 |

== Championship record progression ==
=== Men ===
Men's shot put World Championships record progression
| Mark | Athlete | Nation | Year | Round | Date |
|---|---|---|---|---|---|
| 21.08 m | Dave Laut | United States (USA) | 1983 | Qualification | 1983-08-07 |
| 21.16 m | Ulf Timmermann | East Germany (GDR) | 1983 | Final | 1983-08-07 |
| 21.39 m | Edward Sarul | Poland (POL) | 1983 | Final | 1983-08-07 |
| 21.57 m | Alessandro Andrei | Italy (ITA) | 1987 | Qualification | 1987-08-29 |
| 21.63 m | Werner Günthör | Switzerland (SUI) | 1987 | Final | 1987-08-29 |
| 21.75 m | John Brenner | United States (USA) | 1987 | Final | 1987-08-29 |
| 22.12 m | Werner Günthör | Switzerland (SUI) | 1987 | Final | 1987-08-29 |
| 22.23 m | Werner Günthör | Switzerland (SUI) | 1987 | Final | 1987-08-29 |
| 22.36 m | Ryan Crouser | United States (USA) | 2019 | Final | 2019-10-05 |
| 22.90 m | Tom Walsh | New Zealand (NZL) | 2019 | Final | 2019-10-05 |
| 22.91 m | Joe Kovacs | United States (USA) | 2019 | Final | 2019-10-05 |
| 22.94 m | Ryan Crouser | United States (USA) | 2022 | Final | 2022-07-17 |
| 22.98 m | Ryan Crouser | United States (USA) | 2023 | Final | 2023-08-19 |
| 23.51 m | Ryan Crouser | United States (USA) | 2023 | Final | 2023-08-19 |

=== Women ===
Women's shot put World Championships record progression
| Time | Athlete | Nation | Year | Round | Date |
|---|---|---|---|---|---|
| 19.25 m | Helena Fibingerova | Czechoslovakia (TCH) | 1983 | Qualification | 1983-08-10 |
| 19.99 m | Ilona Slupianek | East Germany (GDR) | 1983 | Qualification | 1983-08-10 |
| 20.30 m | Helma Knorscheidt | East Germany (GDR) | 1983 | Final | 1983-08-12 |
| 20.56 m | Ilona Slupianek | East Germany (GDR) | 1983 | Final | 1983-08-12 |
| 20.70 m | Helma Knorscheidt | East Germany (GDR) | 1983 | Final | 1983-08-12 |
| 21.05 m | Helena Fibingerova | Czechoslovakia (TCH) | 1983 | Final | 1983-08-12 |
| 21.21 m | Kathrin Neimke | East Germany (GDR) | 1987 | Final | 1987-09-05 |
| 21.24 m | Natalya Lisovskaya | Soviet Union (URS) | 1987 | Final | 1987-09-05 |
| 21.24 m | Valerie Adams | New Zealand (NZL) | 2011 | Final | 2011-08-29 |

== Best performances ==
=== Top ten furthest World Championship throws^{1} ===
Furthest men's throws at the World Championships
| Rank | Distance (m) | Athlete | Nation | Year | Date |
|---|---|---|---|---|---|
| 1 | 23.51 m | Ryan Crouser | United States | 2023 | 2023-08-19 |
| 2 | 22.94 m | Ryan Crouser | United States | 2022 | 2022-07-17 |
| 3 | 22.91 m | Joe Kovacs | United States | 2019 | 2019-10-05 |
| 4 | 22.90 m | Ryan Crouser | United States | 2019 | 2019-10-05 |
| 4 | 22.90 m | Tom Walsh | New Zealand | 2019 | 2019-10-05 |
| 6 | 22.89 m | Joe Kovacs | United States | 2022 | 2022-07-17 |
| 7 | 22.53 m | Darlan Romani | Brazil | 2019 | 2019-10-05 |
| 8 | 22.37 m | Darlan Romani | Brazil | 2023^{Q} | 2023-08-19 |
| 9 | 22.34 m | Leonardo Fabbri | Italy | 2023 | 2023-08-19 |
| 9 | 22.34 m | Ryan Crouser | United States | 2025 | 2025-09-13 |

Furthest women's throws at the World Championships
| Rank | Distance (m) | Athlete | Nation | Year | Date |
|---|---|---|---|---|---|
| 1 | 21.24 m | Natalya Lisovskaya | Soviet Union | 1987 | 1987-09-05 |
| 1 | 21.24 m | Valerie Adams | New Zealand | 2011 | 2011-08-29 |
| 3 | 21.22 m | Astrid Kumbernuss | Germany | 1995 | 1995-08-05 |
| 4 | 21.21 m | Kathrin Neimke | East Germany | 1987 | 1987-09-05 |
| 5 | 21.05 m | Helena Fibingerová | Czechoslovakia | 1983 | 1983-08-12 |
| 6 | 20.88 m | Valerie Adams | New Zealand | 2013 | 2013-08-12 |
| 7 | 20.83 m | Huang Zhihong | China | 1991 | 1991-08-24 |
| 8 | 20.76 m | Ines Müller | East Germany | 1987 | 1987-09-05 |
| 9 | 20.73 m | Claudia Losch | West Germany | 1987 | 1987-09-05 |
| 10 | 20.71 m | Astrid Kumbernuss | Germany | 1997 | 1997-08-07 |

^{1}Does not include ancillary marks.

== See also ==
- Shot put
- Shot put at the Olympics

== Bibliography ==
- Butler, Mark (2023). World Athletics Championships Budapest 2023 Statistics Book. World Athletics.
