= 1982 European Athletics Championships – Men's shot put =

1982 athletic event

Men's shot put at the European Athletics Championships

These are the official results of the Men's Shot Put event at the 1982 European Championships in Athens, Greece, held at the Olympic Stadium "Spiros Louis" on 8 and 9 September 1982.

== Medalists ==
Gold	Udo Beyer; East Germany
Silver	Jānis Bojārs; Soviet Union
Bronze	Remigius Machura; Czechoslovakia

== Results ==
=== Final ===
9 September

Rank	Name	Nationality	Result	Notes
1st place, gold medalist(s)	Udo Beyer	East Germany	21.50	CR
2nd place, silver medalist(s)	Jānis Bojārs	Soviet Union	20.81	
3rd place, bronze medalist(s)	Remigius Machura	Czechoslovakia	20.59	
4	Vladimir Milić	Yugoslavia	20.52	
5	Mathias Schmidt	East Germany	20.51	
6	Peter Block	East Germany	20.49	
7	Vladimir Kiselyov	Soviet Union	20.40	
8	Sergey Gavryushin	Soviet Union	20.15	
9	Reijo Ståhlberg	Finland	19.49	
10	Alessandro Andrei	Italy	19.28	
11	Edward Sarul	Poland	19.19	
12	Nikolay Khristov	Bulgaria	19.04	
13	Luigi De Santis	Italy	18.88	

=== Qualification ===
8 September

Rank	Name	Nationality	Result	Notes
1	Udo Beyer	East Germany	20.14	Q
2	Remigius Machura	Czechoslovakia	20.09	Q
3	Jānis Bojārs	Soviet Union	20.00	Q
4	Edward Sarul	Poland	19.91	Q
5	Mathias Schmidt	East Germany	19.89	Q
6	Vladimir Kiselyov	Soviet Union	19.82	Q
7	Peter Block	East Germany	19.81	Q
8	Vladimir Milić	Yugoslavia	19.72	Q
9	Nikolay Khristov	Bulgaria	19.62	Q
10	Alessandro Andrei	Italy	19.59	Q
11	Luigi De Santis	Italy	19.55	Q
12	Reijo Ståhlberg	Finland	19.54	Q
13	Sergey Gavryushin	Soviet Union	19.54	Q
14	Marco Montelatici	Italy	19.34	
15	Aulis Akonniemi	Finland	19.30	
16	Jovan Lazarević	Yugoslavia	19.27	
17	Udo Gelhausen	West Germany	18.87	
18	Per Nilsson	Sweden	18.28	
19	Anders Skärvstrand	Sweden	18.22	
20	Luc Viudès	France	18.25	

== Participation ==
According to an unofficial count, 20 athletes from 11 countries participated in the event.

- Bulgaria (1)
- Czechoslovakia (1)
- East Germany (3)
- Finland (2)
- France (1)
- Italy (3)
- Poland (1)
- Soviet Union (3)
- Sweden (2)
- West Germany (1)
- Yugoslavia (2)

== See also ==
- 1980 Men's Olympic Shot Put (Moscow)
- 1982 Shot Put Year Ranking
- 1983 Men's World Championships Shot Put (Helsinki)
- 1984 Men's Olympic Shot Put (Los Angeles)
- 1987 Men's World Championships Shot Put (Rome)
- 1988 Men's Olympic Shot Put (Seoul)
