= Athletics at the 1984 Summer Olympics – Men's shot put =

Men's shot put at the Games of the XXIII Olympiad
- Pictogram for athletics
- Venue: Los Angeles Memorial Coliseum
- Date: 11 August 1984 (qualification and final)
- Competitors: 19 from 13 nations
- Winning distance: 21.26

Medalists
1st place, gold medalist(s)		Alessandro Andrei; Italy
2nd place, silver medalist(s)		Michael Carter; United States
3rd place, bronze medalist(s)		Dave Laut; United States

The men's shot put event at the 1984 Summer Olympics in Los Angeles, United States had an entry list of 19 competitors from 13 nations. The maximum number of athletes per nation had been set at 3 since the 1930 Olympic Congress. The final was held on August 11, 1984. The event was won by Alessandro Andrei of Italy, the nation's first medal in the men's shot put. Michael Carter and Dave Laut of the United States took silver and bronze, respectively, putting Americans back on the podium for the first time since 1972.

== Background ==
This was the 20th appearance of the event, which is one of 12 athletics events to have been held at every Summer Olympics. None of the finalists from the 1980 Games returned. The absence of the East German, Soviet, and Polish teams had a significant impact: world record holder Udo Beyer, defending Olympic champion Vladimir Kiselyov, and inaugural World Champion Edward Sarul were all from boycotting countries.

Chile, Egypt, the Netherlands, and Samoa each made their debut in the men's shot put. The United States made its 19th appearance, most of any nation, having missed only the boycotted 1980 Games.

== Competition format ==
The competition used the two-round format introduced in 1936, with the qualifying round completely separate from the divided final. In qualifying, each athlete received three attempts; those recording a mark of at least 19.70 metres advanced to the final. If fewer than 12 athletes achieved that distance, the top 12 would advance. The results of the qualifying round were then ignored. Finalists received three throws each, with the top eight competitors receiving an additional three attempts. The best distance among those six throws counted.

== Records ==
The standing world and Olympic records prior to the 1984 Games were as follows.

World record	Udo Beyer (GDR)	22.22	Los Angeles, United States	25 June 1983
Olympic record	Vladimir Kiselyov (URS)	21.35	Moscow, Soviet Union	30 July 1980

No new world or Olympic records were set during the competition.

== Schedule ==
All times are Pacific Daylight Time (UTC-7)

Date	Time	Round
Saturday, 11 August 1984	10:50; 18:00	Qualifying; Final

== Results ==
=== Qualification ===
- Top 12 and ties and all those reaching 19.70 metres advanced to the final

Rank	Athlete	Nation	1	2	3	Distance	Notes
1	Mike Carter	United States	20.69	—	—	20.69	Q
2	Augie Wolf	United States	20.55	—	—	20.55	Q
3	Alessandro Andrei	Italy	20.18	—	—	20.18	Q
4	Marco Montelatici	Italy	20.14	—	—	20.14	Q
5	Dave Laut	United States	20.01	—	—	20.01	Q
6	Sören Tallhem	Sweden	19.94	—	—	19.94	Q
7	Gert Weil	Chile	19.38	19.94	—	19.94	Q
8	Werner Günthör	Switzerland	19.28	19.71	—	19.71	Q
9	Aulis Akonniemi	Finland	19.13	19.34	19.38	19.38	q
10	Erik de Bruin	Netherlands	19.20	19.28	19.07	19.28	q
11	Bishop Dolegiewicz	Canada	19.00	X	18.95	19.00	q
12	Karsten Stolz	West Germany	18.98	X	17.67	18.98	q
13	Erwin Weitzl	Austria	18.03	18.96	X	18.96	
14	Dimitrios Koutsoukis	Greece	18.74	18.62	18.60	18.74	
15	Ahmed Kamel Shatta	Egypt	18.13	17.95	18.58	18.58	
16	Yngve Wahlander	Sweden	X	18.28	18.27	18.28	
17	Ahmed Mohamed Achouche	Egypt	18.11	X	17.14	18.11	
18	Matt Catalano	Canada	17.10	17.24	16.91	17.24	
19	Henry Smith	Samoa	16.09	X	X	16.09	
—	Stefan Fernholm	Sweden	DNS				
—	Bruno Pauletto	Canada	DNS				
—	Kari Töyrylä	Finland	DNS				

=== Final ===
Rank	Athlete	Nation	1	2	3	4	5	6	Distance
1st place, gold medalist(s)	Alessandro Andrei	Italy	20.41	20.97	21.26	20.55	20.92	20.96	21.26
2nd place, silver medalist(s)	Mike Carter	United States	20.63	20.69	21.09	20.42	X	20.38	21.09
3rd place, bronze medalist(s)	Dave Laut	United States	20.97	18.39	X	20.03	20.31	20.97	20.97
4	Augie Wolf	United States	20.04	19.91	19.41	20.08	19.74	20.93	20.93
5	Werner Günthör	Switzerland	20.28	X	X	19.38	X	20.11	20.28
6	Marco Montelatici	Italy	19.88	19.26	19.98	19.35	19.85	X	19.98
7	Sören Tallhem	Sweden	19.81	X	19.54	X	X	—	19.81
8	Erik de Bruin	Netherlands	19.65	X	X	—	X	X	19.65
9	Aulis Akonniemi	Finland	18.98	X	X	Did not advance			18.98
10	Gert Weil	Chile	18.19	18.69	X	Did not advance			18.69
11	Bishop Dolegiewicz	Canada	18.39	X	X	Did not advance			18.39
12	Karsten Stolz	West Germany	18.31	X	18.21	Did not advance			18.31

== See also ==
- 1982 Men's European Championships Shot Put (Athens)
- 1983 Men's World Championships Shot Put (Helsinki)
- 1984 Men's Friendship Games Shot Put (Moscow)
- 1986 Men's European Championships Shot Put (Stuttgart)
- 1987 Men's World Championships Shot Put (Rome)
