= 1984 European Athletics Indoor Championships – Men's shot put =

Event at international athletics competition

The men's shot put event at the 1984 European Athletics Indoor Championships was held on 4 March.

== Results ==
Rank	Name	Nationality	#1	#2	#3	#4	#5	#6	Result	Notes
1st place, gold medalist(s)	Janis Bojars	Soviet Union	20.20	20.84	x	20.15	20.39	x	20.84	
2nd place, silver medalist(s)	Werner Günthör	Switzerland	19.16	19.65	20.04	x	20.33	x	20.33	
3rd place, bronze medalist(s)	Alessandro Andrei	Italy	19.81	19.97	19.99	19.72	19.32	20.32	20.32	
4	Remigius Machura	Czechoslovakia	19.04	x	19.39	x	19.37	20.11	20.11	
5	Josef Kubeš	Czechoslovakia	19.64	19.45	19.86	x	20.01	19.99	20.01	
6	Jovan Lazarević	Yugoslavia	19.18	19.09	19.66	19.45	19.59	20.01	20.01	
7	Janusz Gassowski	Poland	18.99	19.78	19.94	x	19.99	19.42	19.99	
8	Helmut Krieger	Poland	19.19	x	19.76	19.63	19.36	19.51	19.76	
9	Ivan Ivančić	Yugoslavia	19.34	x	19.10				19.34	
10	Georgi Todorov	Bulgaria	18.94	x	x				18.94	
11	Yngve Wahlander	Sweden	17.83	18.73	x				18.73	
12	Anders Skärvstrand	Sweden	x	18.26	18.50				18.50	
13	Karel Šula	Czechoslovakia	17.67	17.85	17.83				17.85	
14	Jan Sagedal	Norway	17.01	x	17.09				17.09	
