= 1987 European Athletics Indoor Championships – Men's shot put =

Men's shot put at the 1987 European Athletics Indoor Championships

The men's shot put event at the 1987 European Athletics Indoor Championships was held on 21 February.

== Results ==
Rank	Name	Nationality	#1	#2	#3	#4	#5	#6	Result	Notes
1st place, gold medalist(s)	Ulf Timmermann	East Germany	18.89	21.69	21.66	21.22	22.19	x	22.19	CR
2nd place, silver medalist(s)	Werner Günthör	Switzerland	21.04	x	21.35	x	21.53	x	21.53	
3rd place, bronze medalist(s)	Sergey Smirnov	Soviet Union	20.74	20.28	20.97	x	20.72	20.58	20.97	
4	Klaus Bodenmüller	Austria	18.16	19.06	20.16	x	x	19.48	20.16	
5	Karsten Stolz	West Germany	19.35	19.64	19.49	19.16	19.50	x	19.64	
6	Rolf Saalfrank	West Germany	18.92	19.33	19.41	19.36	18.99	19.30	19.41	
7	Vladimir Milić	Yugoslavia	19.30	x	x	x	x	x	19.30	
8	Georgi Todorov	Bulgaria	18.85	18.61	19.07	x	x	x	19.07	
9	Martín Vara	Spain	16.80	16.89	16.72				16.89	
	Arne Pedersen	Norway							DNS	
	Georg Andersen	Norway							DNS	
	Jan Sagedal	Norway							DNS	
