= 1986 European Athletics Indoor Championships – Men's shot put =

The men's shot put event at the 1986 European Athletics Indoor Championships was held on 22 February.

== Results ==
Rank	Name	Nationality	#1	#2	#3	#4	#5	#6	Result	Notes
1st place, gold medalist(s)	Werner Günthör	Switzerland	19.79	21.24	20.15	20.27	21.51	21.19	21.51	
2nd place, silver medalist(s)	Sergey Smirnov	Soviet Union	20.18	x	20.36	20.08	20.13	x	20.36	
3rd place, bronze medalist(s)	Marco Montelatici	Italy	19.38	19.53	19.81	19.86	x	20.11	20.11	
4	Janis Bojars	Soviet Union	19.63	20.03	20.09	20.09	19.96	x	20.09	
5	Edward Sarul	Poland	x	19.73	x	x	19.64	19.60	19.73	
6	Karsten Stolz	West Germany	19.34	19.63	19.45	x	x	x	19.63	
7	Udo Gelhausen	West Germany	18.38	19.33	19.25	19.07	x	19.36	19.36	
8	Anders Skärvstrand	Sweden	18.79	x	x	x	x	x	18.79	
9	Richard Navara	Czechoslovakia	17.26	18.56	x				18.56	
10	Luc Viudès	France	18.54	18.40	18.24				18.54	
11	Janne Ronkainen	Finland	18.14	x	18.37				18.37	
12	Jozef Lacika	Czechoslovakia	18.32	18.34	17.62				18.34	
13	Peter Kassubek	West Germany	17.59	17.52	17.73				17.73	
14	Klaus Bodenmüller	Austria	16.80	x	17.23				17.23	
15	Martín Vara	Spain	x	16.11	x				16.11	
