= 1983 World Championships in Athletics – Men's shot put =

These are the official results of men's shot put at the 1983 IAAF World Championships in Helsinki, Finland. There were a total number of 20 participating athletes, with the final held on 7 August 1983.

== Medalists ==
Gold	Edward Sarul; Poland (POL)
Silver	Ulf Timmermann; East Germany (GDR)
Bronze	Remigius Machura; Czechoslovakia (TCH)

== Schedule ==
- All times are Eastern European Summer Time (UTC+3)

Qualification Round
Group A	Group B
07.08.1983 – 11:00h	07.08.1983 – 11:00h
Final Round
07.08.1983 – 19:00h

== Abbreviations ==
- All results shown are in metres

Q	automatic qualification
q	qualification by rank
DNS	did not start
NM	no mark
WR	world record
AR	area record
NR	national record
PB	personal best
SB	season best

== Records ==
Standing records prior to the 1983 World Athletics Championships
World Record	Udo Beyer (GDR)	22.22 m	June 25, 1983	Los Angeles, United States
Event Record	New event			
Broken records during the 1983 World Athletics Championships
Event Record	Dave Laut (USA)	21.08 m	August 7, 1983	Helsinki, Finland
Event Record	Ulf Timmermann (GDR)	21.16 m	August 7, 1983	Helsinki, Finland
Event Record	Edward Sarul (POL)	21.39 m	August 7, 1983	Helsinki, Finland

== Final ==
RANK	FINAL	DISTANCE
	Edward Sarul (POL)	21.39 m
	Ulf Timmermann (GDR)	21.16 m
	Remigius Machura (TCH)	20.98 m
4.	Dave Laut (USA)	20.60 m
5.	Jānis Bojārs (URS)	20.32 m
6.	Udo Beyer (GDR)	20.09 m
7.	Alessandro Andrei (ITA)	20.07 m
8.	Aulis Akonniemi (FIN)	19.85 m
9.	Vladimir Milić (YUG)	19.71 m
10.	Mike Lehmann (USA)	19.69 m
11.	Josef Kubeš (TCH)	19.67 m
12.	Ivan Ivančić (YUG)	19.52 m

== Qualification ==
- Held on Sunday 1983-08-07

RANK	GROUP A	DISTANCE
1.	Dave Laut (USA)	21.08 m
2.	Remigius Machura (TCH)	20.76 m
3.	Ulf Timmermann (GDR)	20.10 m
4.	Jānis Bojārs (URS)	20.04 m
5.	Vladimir Milić (YUG)	19.66 m
6.	Aulis Akonniemi (FIN)	19.65 m
7.	Alessandro Andrei (ITA)	19.57 m
8.	Bishop Dolegiewicz (CAN)	18.68 m
9.	Ahmed Kamel Shatta (EGY)	16.73 m
—	Adnan Houry (SYR)	NM

RANK	GROUP B	DISTANCE
1.	Edward Sarul (POL)	20.82 m
2.	Udo Beyer (GDR)	20.29 m
3.	Mike Lehmann (USA)	19.88 m
4.	Ivan Ivančić (YUG)	19.74 m
5.	Josef Kubeš (TCH)	19.73 m
6.	Kevin Akins (USA)	19.48 m
7.	Erwin Weitzl (AUT)	19.23 m
8.	Werner Günthör (SUI)	19.18 m
9.	Bruno Pauletto (CAN)	18.32 m
10.	Sergey Smirnov (URS)	18.03 m

== See also ==
- 1980 Men's Olympic Shot Put (Moscow)
- 1983 Shot Put Year Ranking
- 1984 Men's Olympic Shot Put (Los Angeles)
- 1986 Men's European Championships Shot Put (Stuttgart)
- 1988 Men's Olympic Shot Put (Seoul)
