= 1987 World Championships in Athletics – Men's shot put =

These are the official results of the men's shot put event at the 1987 IAAF World Championships in Rome, Italy. There were a total number of 21 participating athletes, with the final held on 29 August 1987.

== Medalists ==
Gold	Werner Günthör; Switzerland (SUI)
Silver	Alessandro Andrei; Italy (ITA)
Bronze	John Brenner; United States (USA)

== Schedule ==
- All times are Central European Time (UTC+1)

Qualification Round
Group A	Group B
29.08.1987 – ??:??h	29.08.1987 – ??:??h
Final Round
29.08.1987 – 18:10h

== Abbreviations ==
- All results shown are in metres

Q	automatic qualification
q	qualification by rank
DNS	did not start
NM	no mark
WR	world record
AR	area record
NR	national record
PB	personal best
SB	season best

== Records ==
Standing records prior to the 1987 World Athletics Championships
World Record	Alessandro Andrei (ITA)	22.91 m	August 12, 1987	Viareggio, Italy
Event Record	Edward Sarul (POL)	21.39 m	August 7, 1983	Helsinki, Finland
Broken records during the 1987 World Athletics Championships
Event Record	Alessandro Andrei (ITA)	21.57 m	August 29, 1987	Rome, Italy
Event Record	Werner Günthör (SUI)	21.63 m	August 29, 1987	Rome, Italy
Event Record	John Brenner (USA)	21.75 m	August 29, 1987	Rome, Italy
Event Record	Werner Günthör (SUI)	22.12 m	August 29, 1987	Rome, Italy
Event Record	Werner Günthör (SUI)	22.23 m	August 29, 1987	Rome, Italy

== Qualification ==
- Held on Saturday 29 August 1987

Group A
Rank	Athlete	Nation	Distance
1	Alessandro Andrei	Italy	21.57 m
2	Ulf Timmermann	East Germany	21.11 m
3	Vyacheslav Lykho	Soviet Union	20.99 m
4	Werner Günthör	Switzerland	20.66 m
5	Helmut Krieger	Poland	19.73 m
6	Karsten Stolz	West Germany	19.69 m
7	Gregg Tafralis	United States	19.62 m
8	Georgi Todorov	Bulgaria	19.43 m
9	Ron Backes	United States	19.34 m
10	Dimitrios Koutsoukis	Greece	19.05 m
—	Jan Sagedal	Norway	DNS

Group B
Rank	Athlete	Nation	Distance
1	Udo Beyer	East Germany	20.95 m
2	John Brenner	United States	20.28 m
3	Remigius Machura	Czechoslovakia	20.27 m
4	Klaus Bodenmüller	Austria	19.96 m
5	Sergey Gavryushin	Soviet Union	19.96 m
6	Gert Weil	Chile	19.76 m
7	Udo Gelhausen	West Germany	19.10 m
8	Janne Ronkainen	Finland	18.36 m
9	Lars Sundin	Sweden	17.25 m
—	Arne Pedersen	Norway	DNS

== Final ==
RANK	FINAL	DISTANCE
	Werner Günthör (SUI)	22.23 m CR
	Alessandro Andrei (ITA)	21.88 m
	John Brenner (USA)	21.75 m
4.	Remigius Machura (TCH)	21.39 m
5.	Ulf Timmermann (GDR)	21.35 m
6.	Udo Beyer (GDR)	21.13 m
7.	Klaus Bodenmüller (AUT)	20.41 m
8.	Sergey Gavryushin (URS)	20.15 m
9.	Vyacheslav Lykho (URS)	19.98 m
10.	Gert Weil (CHI)	19.71 m
11.	Karsten Stolz (FRG)	19.22 m
12.	Helmut Krieger (POL)	19.15 m

== See also ==
- 1984 Men's Olympic Shot Put (Los Angeles)
- 1986 Men's European Championships Shot Put (Stuttgart)
- 1988 Men's Olympic Shot Put (Seoul)
- 1990 Men's European Championships Shot Put (Split)
- 1992 Men's Olympic Shot Put (Barcelona)
