= Athletics at the Friendship Games – Men's shot put =

Athletic event held in August 1984 in Moscow, Soviet Union

The men's shot put event at the Friendship Games was held on 17 August 1984 at the Grand Arena of the Central Lenin Stadium in Moscow, Soviet Union.

== Results ==
Rank	Name	Nationality	#1	#2	#3	#4	#5	#6	Result	Notes
1st place, gold medalist(s)	Sergey Kasnauskas	Soviet Union	20.90	20.80	21.64	21.41	x	21.31	21.64	
2nd place, silver medalist(s)	Udo Beyer	East Germany	20.74	x	21.18	21.29	21.60	x	21.60	
3rd place, bronze medalist(s)	Vladimir Kiselyov	Soviet Union	20.90	x	21.26	21.37	21.15	21.58	21.58	
4	Jānis Bojārs	Soviet Union							21.48	
5	Helmut Krieger	Poland							21.03	
6	Remigius Machura	Czechoslovakia							20.82	
7	Edward Sarul	Poland							20.34	
8	Georgi Todorov	Bulgaria							19.56	
9	Josef Kubeš	Czechoslovakia							19.19	
10	Janusz Gassowski	Poland							19.03	
11	Vladislav Kočický	Czechoslovakia							17.79	
12	Aulis Toivonen	Finland							17.68	
13	F. Sidibe	Guinea							9.91	

== See also ==
- Athletics at the 1984 Summer Olympics – Men's shot put
