= Klaus Bodenmüller =

Austrian shot putter (born 1962)

Medal record

Men's athletics

Representing Austria

World Indoor Championships
Silver medal – second place	1991 Seville	Shot put

European Indoor Championships
Gold medal – first place	1990 Glasgow	Shot put
Bronze medal – third place	1992 Genoa	Shot put

Klaus Bodenmüller (born 6 September 1962) is an Austrian former track and field athlete who competed in the shot put. He is Austria's best ever performer in the event and holds the Austrian records at 20.79 m (68 ft 2 1/2 in) outdoors and 21.03 m (68 ft 11 3/4 in) indoors.

A silver medal at the 1991 IAAF World Indoor Championships made him the first Austrian to win a medal at the competition. His victory at the 1990 European Athletics Indoor Championships was the first time an Austrian had won a European shot put medal of any colour. He won a further bronze medal at the 1992 European Athletics Indoor Championships. He was a two-time Olympian, having competed in 1988 and 1992 – he placed sixth in the latter year.

At national level, he won six indoor shot put titles and five outdoors between 1992 and 1993. He ranked within the top twenty in the world by performance in the 1987 and 1993 seasons.

== Career ==
=== Early life ===
Born in Feldkirch, Vorarlberg, he began competing in athletics at a young age, when his mother took him to a sports club when he was nine years old. Initially interested in the javelin throw, he focused on the shot put instead, in which he was getting better results.

He gradually improved his performances over a number of years, clearing seventeen metres in 1983 and reaching beyond eighteen metres by 1985. At that point he began his military service for Austria, but an injury to the head in 1985 left him hospitalised and unable to continue with his training.

=== International and Olympic debut ===
It was in 1985 that he began working with Jean-Pierre Egger – a coach and two-time shot put Olympian for Switzerland. He became part of a training group with Werner Günthör, another Swiss shot putter. This marked the beginning of Bodenmüller, in his mid-twenties, competing at the elite level of the sport. The group began to produce results the following year. He won his first national title at the Austrian Indoor Championships at the start of the year. Both Bodenmüller and Günthör competed at the 1986 European Athletics Championships. The Austrian produced a personal best throw of 18.90 m (62 ft 0 in) to place 14th in the qualifying round on his international debut, while his Swiss partner went on to claim the gold medal.

Bodenmüller improved further the next year, winning the first of his five national titles at the Austrian Athletics Championships. He placed fourth at the 1987 European Athletics Indoor Championships with a best of 20.16 m (66 ft 1 1/2 in), tenth at the 1987 IAAF World Indoor Championships, then seventh at the 1987 World Championships in Athletics. He threw an Austrian record mark of 20.79 m (68 ft 2 1/2 in) in Linz, which was to be the best outdoor performance of his career. He was pushed on the success of Günthör, who won what would be the first of his three world titles in the sport. Bodenmüller ended the year with a second-place finish at the Athletissima meeting.

He was in lesser form in the 1988 season, failing to go beyond the twenty-metre mark. However, his best of the year – 19.70 m (64 ft 7 1/2 in) – was enough for a consecutive fourth place at the 1988 European Athletics Indoor Championships. He made his Olympic debut that year at the 1988 Seoul Games and was eliminated in the qualifying round in 16th place. He had no major international outings in 1989, but did manage a bronze medal at the European Cup B-final with a throw of twenty metres.

=== European medals ===
He reached his athletic peak at the 1990 European Athletics Indoor Championships, where he caused an upset by beating the much more favoured world record holder Ulf Timmermann with an Austrian indoor record of 21.03 m (68 ft 11 3/4 in). This made him Austria's first European champion in the shot put and only the third Austrian man to win a gold medal at the indoor competition, after Andreas Berger and Dietmar Millonig. Outdoors, he consistently threw beyond nineteen metres that year, with highlights being fourth place at the Athletissima meet and a tenth-place finish at the 1990 European Athletics Championships.

The 1991 IAAF World Indoor Championships marked a high point for the Egger training group as Bodenmüller was the silver medallist with 20.42 m (66 ft 11 3/4 in) behind Günthör. It marked the first time an Austrian won a medal of any colour at the IAAF World Indoor Championships. On the outdoor circuit Bodenmüller was second at Athletissima and fourth at the Weltklasse Zürich. His success continued into the 1992 season with a bronze medal at the 1992 European Athletics Indoor Championships. He followed this with his second career Olympic appearance at the 1992 Barcelona Olympics – he much improved upon his previous outing and placed sixth in the final with a mark of 20.48 m (67 ft 2 1/4 in).

=== Final years ===
Entering his thirties, he threw a mark of 20.14 m (66 ft 3/4 in) in the 1993 season, ranking him among the world's top twenty. He did not translate this form at the 1993 World Championships in Athletics, barely clearing eighteen metres in the qualifiers and being eliminated as the fourth worst performer. His training mate Werner Günthör went on to win the title with a throw nearly four metres better. He chose to make it his last season as a professional shot putter and decided to retire from athletics. That year he won his eleventh and final Austrian shot put title in any conditions at the national outdoor championships.

Following his retirement from sport, he studied computing at university and became a software engineer. Though no longer doing throws events, he kept up his interest in sport by taking part in local long-distance running events.

== Personal bests ==
- Shot put outdoor – 20.79 m (68 ft 2 1/2 in) (1987) NR
- Shot put indoor – 21.03 m (68 ft 11 3/4 in) (1990) NR

== National titles ==
- Austrian Athletics Championships: 1987, 1989, 1991, 1992, 1993
- Austrian Indoor Championships: 1986, 1987, 1988, 1990, 1991, 1992

== International competitions ==
Year	Competition	Venue	Position	Event	Notes
Representing Austria
1986	European Indoor Championships	Madrid, Spain	14th	Shot put	17.23 m
1986	European Championships	Stuttgart, West Germany	14th (q)	Shot put	18.90 m
1987	European Indoor Championships	Liévin, France	4th	Shot put	20.16 m
1987	World Indoor Championships	Indianapolis, United States	10th	Shot put	18.84 m
1987	World Championships	Rome, Italy	7th	Shot put	20.41 m
1988	European Indoor Championships	Budapest, Hungary	4th	Shot put	19.70 m
1988	Olympic Games	Seoul, South Korea	16th (q)	Shot put	18.89 m
1989	European Cup (B final)	Brussels, Belgium	3rd	Shot put	
1990	European Indoor Championships	Glasgow, Scotland	1st	Shot put	21.03 m
1990	European Championships	Split, Yugoslavia	10th	Shot put	19.62 m
1991	World Indoor Championships	Seville, Spain	2nd	Shot put	20.42 m
1992	European Indoor Championships	Genoa, Italy	3rd	Shot put	19.99 m
1992	Olympic Games	Barcelona, Spain	6th	Shot put	20.48 m
1993	World Championships	Stuttgart, Germany	14th (q)	Shot put	18.07 m
