= Athletics at the 1983 Summer Universiade – Men's shot put =

The men's shot put event at the 1983 Summer Universiade was held at the Commonwealth Stadium in Edmonton, Canada, on 5 and 6 July 1983.

== Medalists ==
Gold	Silver	Bronze
Mike Carter; United States	Zlatan Saračević; Yugoslavia	Sergey Smirnov; Soviet Union

== Results ==
=== Qualification ===
Rank	Athlete	Nationality	Result	Notes
1	Zlatan Saračević	Yugoslavia	19.18	Q
2	Sergey Smirnov	Soviet Union	19.14	Q
3	Mike Carter	United States	18.96	Q
4	Óskar Jakobsson	Iceland	18.54	Q
5	Augie Wolf	United States	18.49	Q
6	Donatas Stukonis	Soviet Union	18.25	Q
7	Luby Chambul	Canada	17.62	q
8	Martino Catalano	Canada	17.51	q
9	Ahmed Kamel Shata	Egypt	17.06	q
10	Yair Mackler	Israel	16.81	q
11	Erik de Bruin	Netherlands	16.62	q
12	Jaspal Singh	India	15.40	q
13	César Sajche	Guatemala	12.84	q
	Luigi De Santis	Italy	NM	

=== Final ===
Rank	Athlete	Nationality	Result	Notes
1st place, gold medalist(s)	Mike Carter	United States	19.74	
2nd place, silver medalist(s)	Zlatan Saračević	Yugoslavia	19.66	
3rd place, bronze medalist(s)	Sergey Smirnov	Soviet Union	19.61	
4	Óskar Jakobsson	Iceland	19.41	
5	Augie Wolf	United States	19.34	
6	Donatas Stukonis	Soviet Union	19.11	
7	Luby Chambul	Canada	17.71	
8	Erik de Bruin	Netherlands	17.53	
9	Martino Catalano	Canada	17.25	
10	Ahmed Kamel Shata	Egypt	17.06	
11	Yair Mackler	Israel	16.26	
12	Jaspal Singh	India	15.18	
13	César Sajche	Guatemala	12.42	
