= Sergey Smirnov (shot putter) =

Russian track and field athlete (1960-2003)

Personal information
- Born: 17 September 1960 Leningrad, Soviet Union
- Died: 18 September 2003 (aged 43) Saint Petersburg, Russia

Sport
- Sport: Track and field
Medal record
Representing Soviet Union
World Indoor Championships
Bronze medal – third place	1987 Indianapolis	Shot put
European Indoor Championships
Silver medal – second place	1986 Madrid	Shot put
Bronze medal – third place	1987 Liévin	Shot put
Summer Universiade
Bronze medal – third place	1983 Edmonton	Shot put
IAAF World Cup
Silver medal – second place	1985 Canberra	Shot put

Sergey Valentinovich Smirnov (Russian: Сергей Валентинович Смирнов; born 17 September 1960 – 18 September 2003) was a Russian track and field athlete who competed in the shot put. He was a medallist at the IAAF World Indoor Championships in 1987 and at the European Athletics Indoor Championships in 1986 and 1987. Smirnov represented the Soviet Union at the 1988 Seoul Olympics and at the 1983 World Championships in Athletics.

Among his other honours were a gold medal at the 1986 Goodwill Games, a gold medal at the 1985 European Cup (in an unbeaten championship record), and a silver at the 1985 IAAF World Cup. He was a six-time Soviet champion. His personal bests of 22.24 m (72 ft 11 1/2 in) outdoors and 21.40 m (70 ft 2 1/2 in) are the current Russian records in the shot put. He ranks in the top fifteen all-time athletes for the shot put.

== Career ==
=== Early life and Russian record ===
Born in Saint Petersburg (then Leningrad) in the Russian SFSR, he began training in athletics at the Leningrad sports club. He won his first major international medal at the 1983 Summer Universiade, taking the bronze behind America's Mike Carter and Zlatan Saračević of Yugoslavia. At age twenty-two, he made his global senior debut for the Soviet Union at the 1983 World Championships in Athletics, though he failed to get past the qualifying round.

Smirnov made quick improvements in the 1985 season, establishing himself among the world's best shot putters. His throw of 22.05 m (72 ft 4 in) for the gold medal at the 1985 European Cup (held on home soil in Moscow) was a championship record – one that would go unbeaten right up until the European Cup became defunct in 2009. He beat Alessandro Andrei and Udo Beyer (both Olympic champions) to win the event. His throw was the second best ever by a Soviet athlete at that point, behind only the mark of 22.09 m (72 ft 5 1/2 in) set by Sergey Kasnauskas the previous year. His first national title win came at the Soviet Athletics Championships, where he topped the podium with a throw of 21.41 m (70 ft 2 3/4 in). He remained in good form at the 1985 IAAF World Cup, taking the silver medal after Ulf Timmermann. Smirnov ranked second globally on performance that year behind Timmerman's world record throw.

=== Peak and indoor medals ===
He reached his athletic peak in the 1986 season. He threw a Soviet and Russian record distance of 22.24 m (72 ft 11 1/2 in) in Tallinn, although again he was beaten by Timmermann. He was victorious at the Soviet Championships for a second time and his winning mark of 22.16 m (72 ft 8 1/4 in) was the best ever at the meet. He set a meeting record of 21.79 m (71 ft 5 3/4 in) at the Brothers Znamensky Memorial, which as of 2015 remain unbettered. Internationally he won two medals that year. He was the silver medallist at the 1986 European Athletics Indoor Championships behind Swiss champion Werner Günthör. The Goodwill Games in Moscow brought him the second gold medal of his career, beating national rival Sergey Gavryushin and American John Brenner. Becoming the inaugural champion with a throw of 21.79 m (71 ft 5 3/4 in), his mark was never bettered at the games. He comfortably qualified at the 1986 European Athletics Championships, but picked up an injury and was unable to start the final, which was won by Günthör. He placed third in the world on distance that season after East Germany's Beyer (the new world record holder) and Timmermann. This was Smirnov's last top three outdoor ranking of his career.

He won a third straight national title in 1987 and also claimed his first win at the Soviet Indoor Athletics Championships. The indoor circuit was his focus that year and he claimed two bronze medals, first at the 1987 European Athletics Indoor Championships and then at the 1987 IAAF World Indoor Championships, placing behind Timmermann and Günthör at both events. He achieved a lifetime indoor best performance of 21.40 m (70 ft 2 1/2 in) to win his indoor national title in Penza and, as of 2015, this remains the Russian indoor record. It was six centimetres short of the Soviet record held by Sergey Kasnauskas (who took Belarusian citizenship after the dissolution of the Soviet Union).

=== Olympic debut and later career ===
He was defeated at the national championships by Gavryushin in 1988, but still gained selection for the Soviet Union at the 1988 Summer Olympics. At the 1988 Seoul Olympics he ranked fifth in qualifying but throw a little shorter in the final, resulting in an eighth-place finish for his only Olympic appearance. His best throws that year were 21.88 m (71 ft 9 1/4 in) in Vilnius and 21.83 m (71 ft 7 1/4 in) in Moscow. He did not compete internationally in 1989 and his season's best of 20.80 m (68 ft 2 3/4 in) was his worst since 1983. He returned in 1990 and ranked sixth in the world through his season's best of 21.01 m (68 ft 11 in) and narrowly missed out on a medal at the 1990 European Athletics Championships, taking fourth place after Norway's Georg Andersen (banned for doping a year later). Smirnov won his last two Soviet national titles in 1990 and 1991 at the national indoor meet. He ranked second on distance indoors globally in both those years. He was ninth at the 1991 IAAF World Indoor Championships and also won a silver medal at the 1991 European Cup (his last major international medal).

Smirnov acquired Russian citizenship in 1992 and began competing intentionally for the newly independent nation. His only major appearance for Russia was the 1993 IAAF World Indoor Championships, where he placed seventh. He was the inaugural winner of the shot put at the Russian Indoor Athletics Championships that year. He ranked first in the world indoor rankings in 1992 through his mark of 21.01 m (68 ft 11 in) (this was the shortest to top the rankings since 1980, as competitive performances in men's shot put declined in the 1990s).

== Personal bests ==
- Shot put outdoors – 22.24 m (72 ft 11 1/2 in) (1986)
- Shot put indoors – 21.40 m (70 ft 2 1/2 in) (1987)

== National titles ==
- Soviet Athletics Championships
  - Shot put: 1985, 1986, 1987
- Soviet Indoor Athletics Championships
  - Shot put: 1987, 1990, 1991
- Russian Indoor Athletics Championships
  - Shot put: 1993

== International competitions ==
Year	Competition	Venue	Position	Event	Notes
1983	Universiade	Edmonton, Canada	3rd	Shot put	19.61 m
1983	World Championships	Helsinki, Finland	10th (q)	Shot put	18.03 m
1985	European Cup	Moscow, Soviet Union	1st	Shot put	22.05 m CR
1985	World Cup	Canberra, Australia	2nd	Shot put	21.72 m
1986	European Indoor Championships	Madrid, Spain	2nd	Shot put	20.36 m
1986	Goodwill Games	Moscow, Soviet Union	1st	Shot put	21.79 m
1986	European Championships	Stuttgart, West Germany	4th (q)	Shot put	20.40 m
1987	European Indoor Championships	Liévin, France	3rd	Shot put	20.97 m
1987	World Indoor Championships	Indianapolis, United States	3rd	Shot put	20.67 m
1988	Olympic Games	Seoul, South Korea	8th	Shot put	20.36 m
1990	European Championships	Split, Yugoslavia	4th	Shot put	20.45 m
1991	World Indoor Championships	Seville, Spain	9th	Shot put	18.87 m
1991	European Cup	Frankfurt, Germany	2nd	Shot put	19.91 m
1993	World Indoor Championships	Toronto, Canada	7th	Shot put	19.59 m

Sporting positions
Preceded by Werner Günthör	Men's indoor shot put season's best performance 1992	Succeeded by Mike Stulce
