= 1986 European Athletics Championships – Men's shot put =

Men's shot put at the European Athletics Championships

These are the official results of the Men's shot put event at the 1986 European Championships in Stuttgart, West Germany, held at Neckarstadion on 27 and 28 August 1986.

== Medalists ==
Gold	Werner Günthör; Switzerland
Silver	Ulf Timmermann; East Germany
Bronze	Udo Beyer; East Germany

== Results ==
=== Final ===
28 August

Rank	Name	Nationality	Result	Notes
1st place, gold medalist(s)	Werner Günthör	Switzerland	22.22	CR NR
2nd place, silver medalist(s)	Ulf Timmermann	East Germany	21.84	
3rd place, bronze medalist(s)	Udo Beyer	East Germany	20.74	
4	Alessandro Andrei	Italy	20.73	
5	Lars Arvid Nilsen	Norway	20.52	
6	Karsten Stolz	West Germany	19.89	
7	Vladimir Milić	Yugoslavia	19.85	
8	Udo Gelhausen	West Germany	19.76	
9	Helmut Krieger	Poland	18.53	
10	Georg Andersen	Norway	18.45	
	Jan Sagedal	Norway	NM	
	Sergey Smirnov	Soviet Union	DNS	

=== Qualification ===
27 August

Rank	Name	Nationality	Result	Notes
1	Ulf Timmermann	East Germany	21.13	Q
2	Werner Günthör	Switzerland	20.64	Q
3	Udo Beyer	East Germany	20.61	Q
4	Sergey Smirnov	Soviet Union	20.40	Q
5	Jan Sagedal	Norway	20.38	Q
6	Karsten Stolz	West Germany	20.34	Q
7	Alessandro Andrei	Italy	20.27	Q
8	Lars Arvid Nilsen	Norway	19.94	Q
9	Georg Andersen	Norway	19.64	Q
10	Udo Gelhausen	West Germany	19.62	Q
11	Vladimir Milić	Yugoslavia	19.48	Q
12	Helmut Krieger	Poland	19.19	Q
13	Jari Kuoppa	Finland	18.93	
14	Klaus Bodenmüller	Austria	18.90	
15	Janne Ronkainen	Finland	18.82	
16	Dimitrios Koutsoukis	Greece	18.77	

== Participation ==
According to an unofficial count, 16 athletes from 11 countries participated in the event.

- Austria (1)
- East Germany (2)
- Finland (2)
- Greece (1)
- Italy (1)
- Norway (3)
- Poland (1)
- Soviet Union (1)
- Switzerland (1)
- West Germany (2)
- Yugoslavia (1)

== See also ==
- 1983 Men's World Championships Shot Put (Helsinki)
- 1984 Men's Olympic Shot Put (Los Angeles)
- 1986 Shot Put Year Ranking
- 1987 Men's World Championships Shot Put (Rome)
- 1988 Men's Olympic Shot Put (Seoul)
