= Athletics at the 1988 Summer Olympics – Men's shot put =

Men's shot put at the Games of the XXIV Olympiad
- Pictogram for athletics
- Venues: Olympic Stadium
- Dates: 23 September (qualification and final)
- Competitors: 21 from 17 nations
- Winning distance: 22.47 OR

Medalists
1st place, gold medalist(s)		Ulf Timmermann; East Germany
2nd place, silver medalist(s)		Randy Barnes; United States
3rd place, bronze medalist(s)		Werner Günthör; Switzerland

The men's shot put event at the 1988 Summer Olympics in Seoul, South Korea had an entry list of 21 competitors from 17 nations, with two qualifying groups before the final (12) took place on Friday September 23, 1988. The maximum number of athletes per nation had been set at 3 since the 1930 Olympic Congress. The event was won by Ulf Timmermann of East Germany, the nation's second victory in the men's shot put. Randy Barnes of the United States took silver, the second straight Games that an American finished second. Werner Günthör earned Switzerland's first medal in the event, a bronze.

== Background ==
This was the 21st appearance of the event, which is one of 12 athletics events to have been held at every Summer Olympics. The returning finalists from the 1984 Games were defending champion Alessandro Andrei of Italy, fifth-place finisher Werner Günthör of Switzerland, and tenth-place finisher Gert Weil of Chile. Günthör had won the 1987 world championship and 1986 European championship. Andrei had held the world record until May 1988, when Ulf Timmermann of East Germany had made the first throw over 23 metres. Timmermann and his countryman Udo Beyer (1976 gold medalist and 1980 bronze medalist) were expected to challenge Günthör for gold, along with Randy Barnes of the United States.

The People's Republic of China made its debut in the men's shot put. The United States made its 20th appearance, most of any nation, having missed only the boycotted 1980 Games.

== Competition format ==
The competition used the two-round format introduced in 1936, with the qualifying round completely separate from the divided final. In qualifying, each athlete received three attempts; those recording a mark of at least 20.20 metres advanced to the final. If fewer than 12 athletes achieved that distance, the top 12 would advance. The results of the qualifying round were then ignored. Finalists received three throws each, with the top eight competitors receiving an additional three attempts. The best distance among those six throws counted.

== Records ==
The standing world and Olympic records prior to the 1988 Games were as follows.

World record	Ulf Timmermann (GDR)	23.06	Chania, Greece	22 May 1988
Olympic record	Vladimir Kiselyov (URS)	21.35	Moscow, Soviet Union	30 July 1980

Twelve throws by four men beat the old record. Werner Günthör had the first, with his initial throw in the final round of 21.45 metres. Ulf Timmermann quickly beat that and set the mark over 22 metres for the first time, with 22.02 metres in his first throw. Udo Beyer beat the old record at 21.40 metres in the second set of throws, but this put him only in third place so far in the competition. Timmermann improved on his own new record with a 22.16 metres throw in the third set and then a 22.29 metres throw in the fifth. Randy Barnes took the record briefly in the sixth and final throws, hitting 22.39 metres before Timmermann—in the last throw by anyone in the competition—recaptured the record and won gold with 22.47 metres.

== Schedule ==
All times are Korea Standard Time adjusted for daylight savings (UTC+10)

Date	Time	Round
Friday, 23 September 1988	9:10; 16:10	Qualifying; Final

== Results ==
=== Qualifying round ===
Rank	Athlete	Nation	1	2	3	Distance	Notes
1	Ulf Timmermann	East Germany	21.27	—	—	21.27	Q
2	Udo Beyer	East Germany	X	20.97	—	20.97	Q
3	Randy Barnes	United States	20.16	20.83	—	20.83	Q
4	Werner Günthör	Switzerland	20.70	—	—	20.70	Q
5	Sergey Smirnov	Soviet Union	20.13	20.48	—	20.48	Q
6	Alessandro Andrei	Italy	19.72	20.18	19.93	20.18	q
7	Gert Weil	Chile	20.18	19.58	19.59	20.18	q
8	Remigius Machura	Czechoslovakia	19.88	20.16	X	20.16	q
9	Georg Andersen	Norway	X	19.95	20.05	20.05	q
10	Helmut Krieger	Poland	19.42	X	19.75	19.75	q
11	Jim Doehring	United States	16.89	17.66	19.73	19.73	q
12	Gregg Tafralis	United States	19.71	19.44	X	19.71	q
13	Georgi Todorov	Bulgaria	19.25	19.02	19.68	19.68	
14	Pétur Guðmundsson	Iceland	19.21	X	X	19.21	
15	Mohamed Achouch	Egypt	18.19	18.94	18.50	18.94	
16	Klaus Bodenmüller	Austria	18.89	17.54	—	18.89	
17	Ma Yongfeng	China	17.48	17.79	18.27	18.27	
18	Ahmed Shatta	Egypt	16.94	17.61	17.37	17.61	
19	Paul Edwards	Great Britain	17.13	17.11	17.28	17.28	
20	Muhammad Zankawi	Kuwait	X	15.34	15.92	15.92	
21	Han Min-soo	South Korea	15.67	15.68	15.64	15.68	

=== Final ===
Rank	Athlete	Nation	1	2	3	4	5	6	Distance	Notes
1st place, gold medalist(s)	Ulf Timmermann	East Germany	22.02 OR	21.31	22.16 OR	21.90	22.29 OR	22.47 OR	22.47	OR
2nd place, silver medalist(s)	Randy Barnes	United States	20.17	20.72	X	21.31	21.01	22.39 OR	22.39	
3rd place, bronze medalist(s)	Werner Günthör	Switzerland	21.45 OR	21.59	21.70	20.98	21.99	21.61	21.99	
4	Udo Beyer	East Germany	X	21.40	20.84	20.82	21.30	21.31	21.40	
5	Remigius Machura	Czechoslovakia	20.57	20.03	20.16	20.36	20.12	20.29	20.57	
6	Gert Weil	Chile	20.22	20.09	X	20.23	20.21	20.38	20.38	
7	Alessandro Andrei	Italy	19.71	20.17	20.06	19.93	20.36	20.26	20.36	
8	Sergey Smirnov	Soviet Union	20.11	X	20.36	X	X	X	20.36	
9	Gregg Tafralis	United States	20.16	X	X	Did not advance			20.16	
10	Georg Andersen	Norway	X	X	19.91	Did not advance			19.91	
11	Jim Doehring	United States	19.27	X	19.89	Did not advance			19.89	
12	Helmut Krieger	Poland	X	19.51	X	Did not advance			19.51	

== See also ==
- 1984 Men's Olympic Shot Put (Los Angeles)
- 1986 Men's European Championships Shot Put (Stuttgart)
- 1987 Men's World Championships Shot Put (Rome)
- 1990 Men's European Championships Shot Put (Split)
- 1991 Men's World Championships Shot Put (Tokyo)
- 1992 Men's Olympic Shot Put (Barcelona)
