= Athletics at the 1980 Summer Olympics – Men's shot put =

Men's shot put at the Games of the XXII Olympiad
- Pictogram for athletics
- Venue: Lenin Central Stadium
- Dates: 28 July 1980 (qualifications); 30 July 1980 (finals)
- Competitors: 16 from 11 nations
- Winning distance: 21.35 OR

Medalists
1st place, gold medalist(s)		Vladimir Kiselyov; Soviet Union
2nd place, silver medalist(s)		Aleksandr Baryshnikov; Soviet Union
3rd place, bronze medalist(s)		Udo Beyer; East Germany

The men's shot put event at the 1980 Summer Olympics in Moscow, Soviet Union had an entry list of 16 competitors from 11 nations. The maximum number of athletes per nation had been set at 3 since the 1930 Olympic Congress. The final was held on Wednesday 30 July 1980, with the qualifying round staged two days earlier in the Lenin Stadium. The top twelve and ties, and all those reaching 19.60 metres advanced to the final. The event was won by Vladimir Kiselyov of the Soviet Union, the nation's first victory in the men's shot put. The Soviet Union became only the third nation to reach the podium in consecutive Games in the event, as East Germany became the second to reach a three-Games streak on the podium as Udo Beyer took bronze. Beyer (after gold in 1976) and Aleksandr Baryshnikov (silver, after bronze in 1976) became the ninth and tenth men to win multiple medals in the shot put.

== Background ==
This was the 19th appearance of the event, which is one of 12 athletics events to have been held at every Summer Olympics. Returning finalists from the 1976 Games were defending champion Udo Beyer of East Germany, bronze medalist Aleksandr Baryshnikov of the Soviet Union, sixth-place finisher Geoff Capes of Great Britain, and twelfth-place finisher Reijo Ståhlberg of Finland. During the 1970s, the East Germans and the Soviets had overtaken the United States as the top shot putters (the Americans had won 14 gold medals in 16 Games from 1896 to 1968, but had only a silver in 1972 and fourth place in 1976), so the American-led boycott had little effect on the top contenders. Beyer was the favorite, as the defending Olympic champion, 1978 European champion, and world record holder.

Bulgaria made its debut in the men's shot put. Great Britain made its 13th appearance, most of any nation competing, though only third-most overall behind the United States (18 appearances, missing the competition for the first time) and Greece (14 appearances).

== Competition format ==
The competition used the two-round format introduced in 1936, with the qualifying round completely separate from the divided final. In qualifying, each athlete received three attempts; those recording a mark of at least 19.60 metres advanced to the final. If fewer than 12 athletes achieved that distance, the top 12 would advance. The results of the qualifying round were then ignored. Finalists received three throws each, with the top eight competitors receiving an additional three attempts. The best distance among those six throws counted.

== Records ==
The standing world and Olympic records prior to the 1980 Games were as follows.

World record	Udo Beyer (GDR)	22.15	Gothenburg, Sweden	6 July 1978
Olympic record	Aleksandr Baryshnikov (URS)	21.32	Montreal, Canada	24 July 1976

The Olympic record came within six throws from surviving the Games. Vladimir Kiselyov led the competition with 21.10 metres until the last throw for each man in the finals; throwing third of the remaining eight, his ultimate put was 21.35 metres to take the record. The five men after him were unable to surpass that throw, including the other two medalists fouling. Kiselyov was the only putter to achieve a personal best, ending Udo Beyer's 34 straight victory streak.

== Schedule ==
All times are Moscow Time (UTC+3)

Date	Time	Round
Monday, 28 July 1980	10:30	Qualifying
Wednesday, 30 July 1980	18:35	Final

== Results ==
=== Qualifying ===
Rank	Athlete	Nation	1	2	3	Distance	Notes
1	Vladimir Kiselyov	Soviet Union	20.72	—	—	20.72	Q
2	Aleksandr Baryshnikov	Soviet Union	20.58	—	—	20.58	Q
3	Vladimir Milić	Yugoslavia	20.56	—	—	20.56	Q
4	Reijo Ståhlberg	Finland	20.53	—	—	20.53	Q
5	Anatoliy Yarosh	Soviet Union	20.19	—	—	20.19	Q
6	Udo Beyer	East Germany	19.94	—	—	19.94	Q
7	Hans-Jürgen Jacobi	East Germany	19.15	19.57	19.92	19.92	Q
8	Geoff Capes	Great Britain	19.75	—	—	19.75	Q
9	Hreinn Halldorsson	Iceland	19.29	19.74	—	19.74	Q
10	Jaromír Vlk	Czechoslovakia	19.58	19.69	—	19.69	Q
11	Óskar Jakobsson	Iceland	19.30	X	19.66	19.66	Q
12	Jean-Pierre Egger	Switzerland	19.61	—	—	19.61	Q
13	Nikola Khristov	Bulgaria	17.82	18.94	19.01	19.01	
14	Mohammad Al-Zinkawi	Kuwait	17.15	X	17.03	17.15	
15	Bahadur Singh Chauhan	India	17.05	16.91	16.72	17.05	
—	Valcho Stoev	Bulgaria	X	X	X	No mark	

=== Final ===
Rank	Athlete	Nation	1	2	3	4	5	6	Distance	Notes
1st place, gold medalist(s)	Vladimir Kiselyov	Soviet Union	21.10	20.86	21.03	21.03	21.00	21.35 OR	21.35	OR
2nd place, silver medalist(s)	Aleksandr Baryshnikov	Soviet Union	20.20	21.08	20.66	20.39	X	X	21.08	
3rd place, bronze medalist(s)	Udo Beyer	East Germany	X	20.70	21.06	20.98	X	X	21.06	
4	Reijo Ståhlberg	Finland	19.83	X	20.20	19.63	20.82	20.58	20.82	
5	Geoff Capes	Great Britain	20.50	X	19.47	X	19.69	19.23	20.50	
6	Hans-Jürgen Jacobi	East Germany	20.32	X	19.80	19.50	X	20.00	20.32	
7	Jaromír Vlk	Czechoslovakia	20.24	X	19.77	19.62	19.84	20.01	20.24	
8	Vladimir Milić	Yugoslavia	20.07	X	19.69	X	20.06	X	20.07	
9	Anatoliy Yarosh	Soviet Union	19.63	19.93	X	Did not advance			19.93	
10	Hreinn Halldorsson	Iceland	19.55	18.99	19.16	Did not advance			19.55	
11	Oskar Jakobsson	Iceland	19.07	X	X	Did not advance			19.07	
12	Jean-Pierre Egger	Switzerland	18.25	18.26	18.90	Did not advance			18.90	

== See also ==
- 1976 Men's Olympic Shot Put (Montreal)
- 1978 Men's European Championships Shot Put (Prague)
- 1982 Men's European Championships Shot Put (Athens)
- 1983 Men's World Championships Shot Put (Helsinki)
