= Detlef Bock =

German shot putter

Personal information
- Full name: Detlef Bock
- Nationality: Germany
- Born: 15 August 1974 (age 51) Staßfurt, Saxony-Anhalt, East Germany
- Height: 1.94 m (6 ft 4 1/2 in)
- Weight: 135 kg (298 lb)

Sport
- Sport: Athletics
- Event: Shot put
- Club: VfL Wolfsburg
- Coached by: Werner Goldmann

Achievements and titles
- Personal best: Shot put: 20.72 (2005)

Detlef Bock (born 15 August 1974 in Staßfurt, Saxony-Anhalt) is a retired German shot putter. Born and raised in the former East Germany, Bock represented his nation Germany at the 2004 Summer Olympics and also trained as a member of the athletics squad for the sport club VfL Wolfsburg (until 2006) under his coach Werner Goldmann. In 2005, Bock threw a personal best of 20.72 metres at a shot put meeting in Engers, finishing behind his rival Ralf Bartels by sixty centimetres.

Bock qualified for the German squad, along with Bartels and Peter Sack, in the men's shot put at the 2004 Summer Olympics in Athens. Earlier in the process, he achieved a 2004 season best and an A-standard entry mark of 20.44 metres from the German shot put meet in Engers. Held inside the renowned Ancient Olympia Stadium, Bock launched a best shot of 18.89 metres on his second attempt in the prelims. Placing thirty-third out of 39 athletes in the overall standings, Bock failed to advance further to the final round.
