= Sergey Gavryushin =

Personal information
- Born: 27 June 1959 (age 67) Moscow, Soviet Union

Sport
- Sport: Track and field

Sergey Gavryushin (Russian: Сергей Гаврюшин; born 27 June 1959) is a former track and field athlete for the Soviet Union who competed in the shot put. His greatest achievement was a throw of 22.10 m (72 ft 6 in) in the 1986 season. This ranked him only fifth for the year but placed him in the all-time top ten for the event. This mark continues to rank highly and places Gavryushin within the all-time top 20 athletes, as of 2016. He also ranked seventh and sixth in the global seasonal lists for 1987 and 1988, respectively.

Given the high standard of men's throws in the Soviet Union during this period, Gavryushin only competed at three major international events. He had identical results at the 1982 European Athletics Championships and 1987 World Championships in Athletics, coming eighth with throws of 20.15 m (66 ft 1 1/4 in). His sole major medal came on home turf at the 1986 Goodwill Games in Moscow, where he was a silver medallist in a Soviet 1–2 finish behind Sergey Smirnov.

He was a one-time champion at the Soviet Athletics Championships, taking the title in 1988 with a throw of 21.39 m (70 ft 2 in).

== International competitions ==
Year	Competition	Venue	Position	Notes
1982	European Championships	Athens, Greece	8th	20.15 m
1986	Goodwill Games	Moscow, Soviet Union	2nd	21.09 m
1987	World Championships	Rome, Italy	8th	20.15 m

== National titles ==
- Soviet Athletics Championships
  - Shot put: 1988
