= Hans-Jürgen Jacobi =

German shot putter

Personal information
- Nationality: German
- Born: 26 July 1950 (age 75)

Sport
- Sport: Athletics
- Event: Shot put

Hans-Jürgen Jacobi (born 26 July 1950) is a German athlete. He competed in the men's shot put at the 1980 Summer Olympics.
