= Helmut Krieger =

Polish shot putter (born 1958)

Helmut Krieger (born 17 July 1958 in Sławięcice, Kędzierzyn-Koźle) is a male former track and field shot putter from Poland, who represented his native country at the 1988 Summer Olympics in Seoul, South Korea. He set his personal best (21.30 m) in the Men's shot put event in 1986.

== International competitions ==
| Year | Competition | Venue | Position | Notes |
|---|---|---|---|---|
| 1984 | European Indoor Championships | Gothenburg, Sweden | 8th | 19.76 m |
| 1984 | Friendship Games | Moscow, Soviet Union | 5th | 21.03 m |
| 1985 | World Indoor Games | Paris, France | 5th | 19.58 m |
| 1985 | European Indoor Championships | Piraeus, Greece | 7th | 19.39 m |
| 1986 | Goodwill Games | Moscow, Soviet Union | – | NM |
| 1986 | European Championships | Stuttgart, West Germany | 9th | 18.53 m |
| 1987 | World Championships | Rome, Italy | 12th | 19.15 m |
| 1988 | Olympic Games | Seoul, South Korea | 12th | 19.51 m |
| 1988 | IAAF Grand Prix Final | West Berlin, West Germany | 1st | 20.79 m |
| 1989 | European Indoor Championships | The Hague, Netherlands | 7th | 19.51 m |
| 1990 | European Indoor Championships | Glasgow, United Kingdom | 15th | 18.57 m |
| 1990 | European Championships | Split, Yugoslavia | 13th (q) | 19.20 m |
| 1991 | World Indoor Championships | Seville, Spain | 11th | 18.59 m |
