= Bruno Pauletto =

Italian-Canadian shot putter

Personal information
- Nationality: Italian (till 1979); Canada (since 1979)
- Born: 21 June 1954 (age 72) Portogruaro, Italy

Sport
- Sport: Athletics
- Event: Shot put
- Club: Telettra-Atletica Rieti
- Retired: 1983

Achievements and titles
- Personal best: Shot put: 20.61 (1983)
Medal record
Men's Athletics
Representing Canada
Commonwealth Games
Gold medal – first place	1982 Brisbane	Shot put
Silver medal – second place	1978 Edmonton	Shot put
Pan American Games
Bronze medal – third place	1979 San Juan	Shot put

Bruno Pauletto (born 21 January 1954) is a physiologist, an author, a business manager, a former coach, and a former Canadian track and field athlete. He graduated from CMU and UT, and he published several books and articles on exercise physiology.

During his athletic career, he specialised in the shot put events, active 1974 to 1983. An Italian-born athlete, he represented Canada internationally. He set the national Italian record and later became the Canadian national record holder in the outdoor shot put. The former title remained unbeaten for six years and the latter for eighteen years. To date, he still holds the provincial record of Quebec. A three-time Canadian national champion, he had a lifetime best of 20.61 m (67 ft 7 1/4 in).

== Career highlights ==
Bruno Pauletto, MS, CSCS, FNSCA, grew up in Portogruaro, Italy, and Sept-Îles, Quebec, and he graduated as exercise physiologist from the University of Tennessee. Bruno Pauletto represented Canada at two consecutive Commonwealth Games: he won the gold medal in the men's shot put event at the XII Commonwealth Games in Brisbane in 1982, after striking silver in 1978. A year later, he participated in the 1979 Pan American Games and placed third. He also took part in the first IAAF World Cup in Düsseldorf in 1977 and the first IAAF World Championships in Athletics in Helsinki in 1983 as a member of the Canadian team and was selected twice for the Olympic Games. He also competed in discus throw.

Having already practised as a coach for strength training and conditioning since 1981, Pauletto devoted his life to coaching as of the 1984 season. He created his own company in 1986, published several articles, videos and three textbooks on strength training, and ultimately was nominated president of the National Strength and Conditioning Association (NSCA), where he also was a member of several committees.

Bruno Pauletto received two national awards for his coaching performances and was inducted into the Hall of Fame of the Central Michigan Chippewas.

=== Collegiate and university career ===
Bruno Pauletto earned his Bachelor of Science in Exercise Physiology in 1978 from the Central Michigan University (CMU), where he was on a track and field scholarship. In 1980, he took his Master of Science in Exercise Physiology at the University of Tennessee (UT).

While at Central Michigan University he competed in the shot put collegiately for their team, the Central Michigan Chippewas, and:

- came fifth in the shot put event at the 1977 NCAA Men's Outdoor Track and Field Championship
- won the 1978 American collegiate NCAA's indoor shot put championships (Division I) with a toss of 64-1 ¼, earning the title of "National Champion"
- took the runner-up spot at the NCAA Outdoors in 1978.

Representing CMU he had much success in the Mid-American Conference:

- he was a MAC outdoor individual champion in shot put in 1976
- he won the title in shot put again in 1977 (with 63-3 ¾)
- the same year won the conference title in discus as well, with 160-5
- and in 1978 he took his fourth title and set a conference record in shot put with 19.89 m (65 ft 3 in). The latter record was still unmatched in 2009.

In the year 1978, he furthermore:

- established the MAC record (outdoor) posting 65-3, which was still unmatched in 2009
- was named outdoor "MAC Outstanding Performer"
- earned his own university's indoor record by throwing 64-1 and outdoor record with his aforementioned 65-3 throw, both still unmatched in 2012.

Altogether, Bruno Pauletto was a three-time All-America shot putter: indoor in 1978 and outdoor in 1977 and 1978.

Since 1990, Pauletto has been an inductee of the Hall of Fame of the Central Michigan Chippewas.

=== Professional athlete career ===
Internationally, Pauletto competed for Canada after taking Canadian citizenship. At his first major competition for his adoptive country he placed fifth with 18.30 m (60 ft 1/4 in) at the first IAAF World Cup, in Düsseldorf on September 2, 1977, and in the same year was runner-up at the 1977 Pacific Conference Games, behind American Colin Anderson.

Later Pauletto set the best Italian shot put mark in 1979 with a 20.13 m (66 ft 1/2 in) throw during an outdoor event in Milan, Italy, on June 23. Pauletto, who was then competing with the club Telettra-Atletica Rieti, contributed with this throw to place his team sixth at the 1979 National Club Championship. This performance remained the national Italian record until Marco Montelatici beat it in May 1985 with 20.90 m.

Pauletto's first Canadian Championship participation was in Edmundston on March 2–3, 1974. In 1980 he broke the Canadian record in Sherbrooke with a 20.33 m (66 ft 8 1/4 in) throw. On 22 May 1983 he established his personal best in shot put with a 20.61 m (67 ft 7 1/4 in) throw, achieved at an outdoor event in Knoxville, Tennessee and reaching a new Canadian national senior record. Between 1976 and 1983, only he and Bishop Dolegiewicz won the honour, with the pair dominating the national scene. Pauletto's 1983 record was to stay for 18 years, until Brad Snyder broke it by 2 cm at the 2001 World Championships, with a heave of 20.63 m (67 ft 8 in). Thanks to that performance Bruno Pauletto ranks fourth in the list of the top 10 Canadian all-time outdoor ranking (as of 23 July 2012), and he still holds (as of 2013) the outdoor provincial record of Quebec.

His first medal at a major game came in 1978 at the Commonwealth Games held in Edmonton, Alberta, Canada. On home turf, he took the silver medal behind England's Geoff Capes with a throw of 19.33 m (63 ft 5 in), and national rival Dolegiewicz completed the podium in third. He gave a better performance at the Pan American Games in San Juan, Puerto Rico in July 1979, clearing 19.61 m (64 ft 4 in), but on that occasion his placing with Dolegiewicz was reversed, as Pauletto claimed the bronze while American Dave Laut won with a throw beyond twenty metres. Pauletto captured the gold medal at the XII Commonwealth Games in Brisbane in 1982 with a mark of 19.55 m (64 ft 1 1/2 in) ahead of the English champion Mike Winch. This made him the third Canadian to win the shot put at the Commonwealth Games after Dave Steen in 1970 and women's champion Jane Haist in 1974; Canada had to wait for 28 years until another shot putter, Dylan Armstrong, brought back a Commonwealth gold medal again.

Pauletto also took part in the First IAAF World Championships in Athletics in Helsinki in 1983 as a member of the Canadian team, where he participated in the shot put event, ranking 17th in qualifying.

Bruno Pauletto was selected twice for the Olympic Games, in 1980 and in 1984. He could not participate to the 1980 Olympics due to the Olympic boycott of the Moscow Games, which was a part of a package of actions led by the United States to protest against the Soviet–Afghan War. By 1984, he had already started a new career as a coach and exercise physiologist and eventually did not compete in any actual Olympic events.

=== Coaching career, author and business manager ===
After graduating from UT, Bruno Pauletto was hired as a full-time conditioning coach in 1980 and soon became the university's head strength and conditioning coach of the Athletic Department, with a staff of three graduate assistants. He was also the strength coach of the 1985 Tennessee Volunteers football team to represent UT in the NCAA Division I–A football season. While he was UT's coach, he also became NSCA Director for the State of Tennessee and, in 1985, he published his first articles on strength training, including on Power Clean.

He left that position to manage his and his wife's own company headquartered in Knoxville, Tennessee, founded in 1986 and registered under the name Power Systems. The company is specialized in supplying fitness and sports performance training equipment. In 2012 Power Systems signed a cooperation agreement with Life Fitness, a division of Brunswick Corporation. «Power Systems is a Christian-based business and we follow those guidelines in all aspects of the company; All of our business transactions reflect a firm commitment to our core value… Integrity», Bruno Pauletto says.

From June 1991 to June 1994, Bruno Pauletto was elected President of the National Strength and Conditioning Association (NSCA). In view of the financial imbalance of the Association in 1991 Pauletto introduced a tighter cost control, and the efficiency gains achieved under his management allowed to consolidate a sound financial situation. He also was a member of several NSCA committees.

During that period of time, Bruno Pauletto published three books on strength training: for coaches, for football and for basketball. In 2007, he invented and patented a new type of exercise hurdle.

He was also a member of the editorial board of the magazine Training & Conditioning (T&C).

== Awards ==
=== Personal ===
- 1986: "College Strength and Conditioning Professional of the Year Award", presented by the National Strength and Conditioning Association (NSCA) in July 1986
- 1990: inducted into the Hall of Fame of the Central Michigan Chippewas
- 1997: "President's Award", presented by the National Strength and Conditioning Association (NSCA)
- 2008: "Lifetime Achievement Award", presented at the annual conference of the NSCA in July 2008.

=== Business awards ===
- 2004, 2007, 2008: three-time "NOVA 7 Supplier Award" winner in the category "Best Free Weights and Specialized Equipment Supplier", presented by Fitness Management Magazine
- 2008: Occupational Safety / Health Award Program, "Perfect Record Award" for operating 117,960 employee hours without occupational injury or illness involving days away from work, granted by the National Safety Council (NSC)
- 2009: selected in the list of the 25 Best Employers in Tennessee by Business Tennessee Magazine
- 2010: "Achievement Award", presented by the Tennessee Center for Performance Achievement Award
- 2011: "Vendor of the Year" award, presented by Gold's Gym Franchisee Association (GGFA).

== Achievements ==
=== Personal bests ===
- Shot put outdoor: 20.61 m (67 ft 7 1/4 in) (1983)
- Shot put indoor: 20.02 m (65 ft 8 in) (1980)

=== International competitions ===
Year	Competition	Venue	Position	Notes
Representing Canada
1977	First IAAF World Cup	Düsseldorf, Germany	5th	Shot put 18.30 m
1978	XIth Commonwealth Games	Edmonton, Canada	2nd	Shot put 19.33 m
1979	VIIIth Pan American Games	San Juan, Puerto Rico	3rd	Shot put 19.61 m
1982	XIIth Commonwealth Games	Brisbane, Australia	1st	Shot put 19.55 m
1983	1st IAAF World Championships in Athletics	Helsinki, Finland	17th	Shot put 18.32 m

=== National titles ===
- Canadian Track and Field Championships
  - Shot put: 1978, 1980, 1983
- NCAA Men's Indoor Track and Field Championship
  - Shot put: 1978

== Toponyms ==
In the year 2008 a public track and field park in Sept-Îles was named Parc Bruno-Pauletto (50° 13' 16").

== Publications ==
=== Books ===
- Pauletto, Bruno (1991). Strength Training for Coaches. Champaign, IL: Leisure Press. p. 179. ISBN 978-0880113717.
- Pauletto, Bruno (1992). Strength Training for Football. Champaign, IL: Human Kinetics Publishers. p. 128. ISBN 978-0873223980.
- Pauletto, Bruno (1993). Strength Training for Basketball. Champaign, IL: Human Kinetics Publishers. pp. 133. ISBN 978-0873224338.

=== Articles ===
- Pauletto, Bruno (1985). "Football: Maximum off-season results through weight training and aerobic dance". National Strength & Conditioning Association Journal. 7 (2 / April). NSCA: 56–57.
- Pauletto, Bruno; Evans, Jeff (1985). "Football supervision: The max factor". National Strength & Conditioning Association Journal. 7 (3 / June). NSCA: 48–51. doi:10.1519/0744-0049(1985)007<0048:TMF>2.3.CO;2 (inactive 11 July 2025).
- Pauletto, Bruno (1985). "Winter Conditioning for Football: The Tennessee Way". National Strength & Conditioning Association Journal. 7 (5 October). NSCA: 28–31.
- Pauletto, Bruno (1985). "Sets and repetitions". National Strength & Conditioning Association Journal. 7 (6 / December). NSCA: 67–69. doi:10.1519/0744-0049(1985)007<0067:SAR>2.3.CO;2 (inactive 11 July 2025).
- Pauletto, Bruno (1985). "The Power Clean: Part 1". BFS Magazine (November). Bigger, Faster, Stronger. Archived from the original on 13 August 2017.
- Pauletto, Bruno (1986). "The Power Clean: Part 2". BFS Magazine (January). Bigger, Faster, Stronger.
- Pauletto, Bruno (1986). "The Power Clean: Part 3". BFS Magazine (March–April). Bigger, Faster, Stronger.
- Pauletto, Bruno (1986). "The Power Clean: Part 4". BFS Magazine (May–June). Bigger, Faster, Stronger. Archived from the original on 13 August 2017.
- Pauletto, Bruno (1986). "Intensity". National Strength & Conditioning Association Journal. 8 (1 / February). NSCA: 33–37. doi:10.1519/0744-0049(1986)008<0033:I>2.3.CO;2 (inactive 11 July 2025).
- Pauletto, Bruno (1986). "Choice and order of exercises". National Strength & Conditioning Association Journal. 8 (2 / April). NSCA: 71–74.
- Pauletto, Bruno (1986). "Rest and recuperation". National Strength & Conditioning Association Journal. 8 (3 / June). NSCA: 52–53. doi:10.1519/0744-0049(1986)008<0052:RAR>2.3.CO;2 (inactive 11 July 2025).
- Pauletto, Bruno (1986). "LETʼS TALK TRAINING #5: Periodization–Peaking". National Strength & Conditioning Association Journal. 8 (4): 30. doi:10.1519/0744-0049(1986)008<0030:PP>2.3.CO;2 (inactive 11 July 2025).
- Pauletto, Bruno (1986). "Lack of time, space and equipment". National Strength & Conditioning Association Journal. 8 (6 / December). NSCA: 44–45. doi:10.1519/0744-0049(1986)008<0044:LOTSAE>2.3.CO;2 (inactive 11 July 2025).
- Pauletto, Bruno (1987). "Liability in the weight room". National Strength & Conditioning Association Journal. 9 (1 / February). NSCA: 60–61. doi:10.1519/0744-0049(1987)009<0060:LITWR>2.3.CO;2 (inactive 11 July 2025).
- Pauletto, Bruno (1987). "In-season strength training for sports". National Strength & Conditioning Association Journal. 9 (2 / April). NSCA: 30–33. doi:10.1519/0744-0049(1987)009<0031:ISSTFS>2.3.CO;2 (inactive 11 July 2025).
- Pauletto, Bruno (1987). "Strength training for the multi-sport athlete". National Strength & Conditioning Association Journal. 9 (3 / June). NSCA: 70–72. doi:10.1519/0744-0049(1987)009<0070:STFTMS>2.3.CO;2 (inactive 11 July 2025).
- Pauletto, Bruno (1987). "Strength training versus weight lifting". National Strength & Conditioning Association Journal. 9 (4 / August). NSCA: 65–68. doi:10.1519/0744-0049(1984)009<0065:STVWL>2.3.CO;2 (inactive 11 July 2025).
- Pauletto, Bruno (1987). "Understanding the Power Clean: Guidelines". Scholastic Coach. 57 (4): 56–57.
- Pauletto, Bruno (1987). "Understanding the Power Clean: Execution". Scholastic Coach. 57 (5): 82–85.
- Pauletto, Bruno (1991). "The Speed Chute". National Strength & Conditioning Association Journal. 9 (4 / August). NSCA: 65–68. doi:10.1519/0744-0049(1984)009<0065:STVWL>2.3.CO;2 (inactive 11 July 2025).
- Semenick, Doug; Connors, Jeff; Carter, Mike; Harman, Everett; Baechle, Thomas Ed.; Emery, Phil; McBride, John D.; Lachance, Peter F.; Richard Trimmer, J.; Rogers, Robb; Kraemer, William J.; Halling, Daye; Kontor, Ken; Pauletto, Bruno (1992). "Rationale, Protocols, Testing/Reporting Forms and Instructions for Wrestling". National Strength & Conditioning Association Journal. 14 (3 / June). NSCA: 54–59. doi:10.1519/0744-0049(1992)014<0054:TAM>2.3.CO;2 (inactive 11 July 2025).
- Pauletto, Bruno (1991). "President's Message: Members make an association". National Strength & Conditioning Association Journal. 13 (4 / August). NSCA: 78–79. doi:10.1519/0744-0049(1991)013<0078:MMAA>2.3.CO;2 (inactive 11 July 2025).
- Pauletto, Bruno (1992). "PRESIDENTʼS MESSAGE: The 'new' NSCA". National Strength & Conditioning Association Journal. 14 (1): 83. doi:10.1519/0744-0049(1992)014<0083:TNN>2.3.CO;2 (inactive 11 July 2025).
- Pauletto, Bruno (1992). "President's Message: What a meeting!". National Strength & Conditioning Association Journal. 14 (2 / April). NSCA: 74–75. doi:10.1519/0744-0049(1992)014<0074:WAM>2.3.CO;2 (inactive 11 July 2025).

Preceded by unknown	Canadian national record holder, shot put, 20.61 m 22 May 1983 – 4 August 2001	Succeeded by Bradley Snyder, 20.63 m
Preceded by (England) Geoff Capes	Commonwealth Games gold medal, shot put 1982	Succeeded by (England) Billy Cole
