= Karsten Stolz =

German shot putter (1964–2025)

Personal information
- Born: 23 July 1964 Oberhausen, North Rhine-Westphalia, West Germany
- Died: 3 May 2025 (aged 60) Dinslaken, North Rhine-Westphalia, Germany
- Height: 2.08 m (6 ft 10 in)
- Weight: 142 kg (313 lb)

Sport
- Country: West Germany
- Sport: Shot put
- Club: TV Wattenscheid

Achievements and titles
- Personal best: 21.15 metres
Medal record
Representing West Germany
European Indoor Championships
Silver medal – second place	1988 Budapest	Shot put
Silver medal – second place	1989 The Hague	Shot put

Karsten Stolz (23 July 1964 – 3 May 2025) was a West German shot putter.

== Biography ==
Stolz represented the sports club TV Wattenscheid, and became West German champion in 1984, 1986, 1987, 1988 and 1989. His personal best throw was 21.15 metres, achieved in September 1988 in Essen.

Stolz was 2.08 metres tall, and during his active career he weighed 142 kg. He died on 3 May 2025, at the age of 60.

== International competitions ==
Year	Competition	Venue	Position	Event	Notes
Representing West Germany
1981	European Junior Championships	Utrecht, Netherlands	3rd	Shot put	17.77 m
1984	Olympic Games	Los Angeles, United States	12th	Shot put	18.31 m
1985	European Indoor Championships	Piraeus, Greece	10th	Shot put	18.48 m
1986	European Indoor Championships	Madrid, Spain	6th	Shot put	19.63 m
1986	European Championships	Stuttgart, West Germany	6th	Shot put	19.89 m
1987	European Indoor Championships	Liévin, France	5th	Shot put	19.64 m
1987	World Indoor Championships	Indianapolis, United States	8th	Shot put	19.60 m
1987	World Championships	Rome, Italy	11th	Shot put	19.22 m
1988	European Indoor Championships	Budapest, Hungary	2nd	Shot put	20.22 m
1989	European Indoor Championships	The Hague, Netherlands	2nd	Shot put	20.22 m
1989	World Indoor Championships	Budapest, Hungary	5th	Shot put	20.11 m
1989	Universiade	Duisburg, West Germany	4th	Shot put	20.13 m
1990	European Indoor Championships	Glasgow, United Kingdom	8th	Shot put	19.14 m
1990	European Championships	Split, Yugoslavia	8th	Shot put	19.95 m
