= Werner Goldmann =

German shot put coach

Werner Goldmann was a German national coach for shot put. He was the coach for famous German shot putter Ulf Timmermann. Because of his commitment in doping practices as in the GDR as in later work for Germany after 1990 he was punished and fired. In 2000s, he coached Robert Harting, Christoph Harting, Julia Fischer and other elite German discus throwers and shot putters in Berlin. After the end of his coaching work with Robert Harting and Christoph Harting, Werner went to Italy for his next coaching career.

Goldmann has also worked with Taiwanese shot putters Chang Ming-huang and Lin Chia-ying, both Asian Athletic Championship medalists.
