= Yngve Wahlander =

Swedish shot putter (born 1958)

Personal information
- Nationality: Swedish
- Born: 15 September 1958 (age 68)

Sport
- Sport: Athletics
- Event: Shot put

Yngve Wahlander (born 15 September 1958) is a Swedish athlete. He competed in the men's shot put at the 1984 Summer Olympics.
