= Matt Catalano =

Canadian athlete (born 1958)

Personal information
- Nationality: Canadian
- Born: 20 February 1958 (age 68) Toronto, Canada

Sport
- Sport: Athletics
- Event: Shot put

Matt Catalano (born 20 February 1958) is a Canadian athlete. He competed in the men's shot put at the 1984 Summer Olympics.
