= Ivan Ivančić =

Croatian athletics coach and shot putter

Personal information
- Born: 6 December 1937 Grabovica, Kingdom of Yugoslavia
- Died: 28 August 2014 (aged 76)
- Height: 6 ft 4 in (1.93 m)
- Weight: 282 lb (128 kg)

Sport
- Country: Yugoslavia
- Event: Shot put
- Club: AK Sloboda Tuzla; AK Crvena Zvezda; AK Partizan
- Retired: 1987

Achievements and titles
- Personal best: 20.77 m (1983)
Medal record
Men's athletics
Representing Yugoslavia
European Athletics Indoor Championships
Bronze medal – third place	1980 Sindelfingen	Shot put
Bronze medal – third place	1983 Budapest	Shot put
Mediterranean Games
Gold medal – first place	1975 Algiers	Shot put
Bronze medal – third place	1979 Split	Shot put

Ivan Ivančić (6 December 1937 – 28 August 2014) was a Croatian athletics coach and shot putter who represented Yugoslavia. He was the gold medalist in the 1975 Mediterranean Games, as well as a multiple national champion and record holder. As a coach, Ivančić specialized in the throwing events, and was best known for coaching Sandra Perković, an Olympic and two-time World discus throw champion.

== Biography ==
Ivančić was born in 1937 in the village of Grabovica, Tomislavgrad in present-day Bosnia and Herzegovina. He finished elementary school and high school in Tuzla, and graduated from the Faculty of Sports and Physical Education at the University of Belgrade.

Ivančić described his entry into athletics as "coincidental": while employed at the Ministry of Transportation in Belgrade, he occasionally competed in shot put at workers' sports games, and good results prompted him to take up athletics more seriously. He joined the AK Crvena Zvezda athletics club, where he spent a total of 24 years, interrupted by a four-year spell with AK Partizan, a rival Belgrade club. He worked as a school teacher for 35 years.

Ivančić became the top Yugoslav shot putter in the early to mid-1970s. He won the Yugoslav championship seven times (1970–1975, 1977) and improved the national record six times. He won a gold medal in shot put in the 1975 Mediterranean Games, bronze in 1979, and two bronze medals in the 1980 European Athletics Indoor Championships and the 1983 European Athletics Indoor Championships. In addition, he represented Yugoslavia in the 1972 and 1976 Summer Olympic Games and in the 1983 World Championships in Athletics in Helsinki, placing 19th, 16th and 12th respectively. His appearance in the shot put final in Helsinki, at the age of 45 years 244 days, makes Ivančić the oldest ever World Championships competitor in shot put, as well as the oldest ever World Championships finalist in any event.

On 31 August 1983 in Koblenz, less than a month after the Helsinki final, Ivančić set his personal best of 20.77 m. As of 2012, this is the world masters record in the M45 category (men 45–49 years of age); no other athlete in this age category has managed to come within two and a half meters of this mark. His 1980 mark of 20.44 m was also a world masters record in the M40 category until it was surpassed in 1985.

Ivančić retired from professional competition in 1987, at the age of 50. For some time, he was active in veterans' competitions, but has given them up because he "could not accept the fact that the shot would not go over 20 meters, like it had before". He died in 2014 at the age of 76.

=== Coaching career ===
Ivančić entered into coaching in the 1970s, while still actively competing, working with Vladimir Milić and Jovan Lazarević, gold medalists in shot put for Yugoslavia at the Mediterranean Games in 1979 and 1983, respectively. After the breakup of Yugoslavia, Ivančić coached Croatian athletes such as Edis Elkasević, world junior champion and world junior record holder in shot put, and gold medalist at the Mediterranean Games; Marin Premeru, world youth record holder in shot put; Ivana Brkljačić, double world junior champion in hammer throw; and Darko Kralj, Paralympic champion, world champion and world record holder in shot put.

Ivančić coached Sandra Perković, the Croatian discus thrower, whom he recognized as a talent in discus throw. In her first year with Ivančić, she improved her personal best from 32 to over 50 meters. After winning gold at the 2009 European Athletics Junior Championships, Perković became the youngest ever European champion in discus throw at the 2010 European Athletics Championships in Barcelona, and successfully defended her title two years later in Helsinki.
