= Udo Gelhausen =

German shot putter (born 1956)

Personal information
- Born: 5 July 1956 (age 69)

Sport
- Sport: Track and field

Udo Gelhausen (born 5 July 1956) is a retired West German shot putter.

He finished seventh at the 1982 European Indoor Championships, seventh at the 1986 European Indoor Championships, eighth at the 1986 European Championships, and seventh at the 1987 World Indoor Championships. He also competed at the 1987 World Championships without reaching the final.

Gelhausen represented the sports club LG Bayer Leverkusen, and became West German champion in 1982. He became West German indoor champion in 1984, 1985 and 1987. His main rival was Karsten Stolz.

His personal best throw was 20.74 metres, achieved in August 1987 in Bonn.
