= Jean-Pierre Egger =

Swiss athlete (1943–2025)

Personal information
- Nationality: Swiss
- Born: 30 July 1943 Neuchâtel, Switzerland
- Died: 29 July 2025 (aged 81)

Sport
- Sport: Athletics
- Event(s): Shot put, discus

Jean-Pierre Egger (30 July 1943 – 29 July 2025) was a Swiss athlete. He competed in the men's shot put at the 1976 Summer Olympics and the 1980 Summer Olympics. Egger died on 29 July 2025, at the age of 81.
