= Michael Carter (nose tackle) =

American football player (born 1960)

No. 95
- Position: Nose tackle

Personal information
- Born: October 29, 1960 (age 66); Dallas, Texas, U.S.
- Listed height: 6 ft 2 in (1.88 m)
- Listed weight: 285 lb (129 kg)

Career information
- High school: Thomas Jefferson (Dallas, Texas)
- College: SMU
- NFL draft: 1984: 5th round, 121st overall pick

Career history
- San Francisco 49ers (1984–1992)

Awards and highlights
- 3× Super Bowl champion (XIX, XXIII, XXIV); 3× First-team All-Pro (1986, 1987, 1988); Second-team All-Pro (1985); 3× Pro Bowl (1985, 1987, 1988); Second-team All-American (1983); First-team All-SWC (1983)

Career NFL statistics
- Sacks: 22.5
- Interceptions: 1
- Stats at Pro Football Reference

Michael Carter
Medal record

Representing United States

Men's athletics

Olympic Games
Silver medal – second place	1984 Los Angeles	Shot put

Summer Universiade
Gold medal – first place	1981 Bucharest	Shot put
Gold medal – first place	1983 Edmonton	Shot put

Michael D'Andrea Carter (born October 29, 1960) is an American former professional football player and track and field athlete. He played pro football as a nose tackle with the San Francisco 49ers in the National Football League (NFL). Carter was a three-time Pro Bowl and four-time All-Pro selection, including three times on the first-team. He helped the 49ers win three Super Bowls. He was also an Olympic athlete, winning a silver medal in the shot put in the 1984 Summer Olympics.

== Early life ==
Carter set the American national high school record of 81 feet 3 1/2 inches in the 12 pound shot put, adding more than nine feet to the previous record. He set this mark at the 1979 Golden West Invitational track and field meet while competing for Jefferson High School of Dallas, Texas. No high school athlete has come within two feet of this record since. In 2004 this record was selected by USA Track & Field as the 16th greatest moment in American track and field over the previous quarter century, the only high school mark to make the top 25 greatest moments. He was Track and Field News "High School Athlete of the Year" in 1979.

== College career ==
Carter attended Southern Methodist University on a football scholarship. He was a member of both the 1981 (10–1) and 1982 undefeated (11–0–1) team, as the immovable object in the center of the defensive line. In track and field, he won four indoor and three outdoor NCAA shot put championships. He was part of the SMU 1983 NCAA Men's Outdoor Track and Field Championship team. His lifetime best with the 16 pound shot came in his only defeat at an NCAA Championship meet, when in his senior year he launched a throw of 21.76 m (71-4 3/4 feet) to finish 2nd to John Brenner's collegiate record of 21.92m (71–11 feet) at the 1984 NCAA Championships.

He won the British AAA Championships shot put title at the 1983 AAA Championships and after graduating, he won the silver medal in the shot put at the 1984 Summer Olympics in Los Angeles.

== Professional career ==
A 6'2", 285-lb. nose tackle, Carter was selected by the San Francisco 49ers in the fifth round of the 1984 NFL draft. As a professional American football player, he played his entire National Football League career with the 49ers from 1984 to 1992. He was a three-time Pro Bowl selection and a three-time Super Bowl champion. He was the first man to win an Olympic medal and a Super Bowl ring in the same season. Both events were held in California and televised on ABC.

He is a Member of the Texas Track and Field Coaches Association Hall of Fame.

== Family and personal life ==
Carter is married and has three children; D'Andra, Michelle (an Olympic athlete and gold medalist), and Michael Jr. Michelle was the 2005 and 2006 NCAA indoor shot put champion, and won the 2016 gold medal at the Rio Olympics on the last of her six throws, edging two-time defending champion Valerie Adams of New Zealand. Michelle, like her father, also set a national high school record in the shot put.
