= Bishop Dolegiewicz =

Canadian shot putter and discus thrower

Personal information
- Born: July 8, 1953 Toronto, Canada
- Died: October 29, 2008 (aged 55) Lehi, Utah, United States

Sport
- Sport: Track and field
Medal record
Representing Canada
Commonwealth Games
Bronze medal – third place	1978 Edmonton	Shot put
Bronze medal – third place	1982 Brisbane	Discus
Pan American Games
Silver medal – second place	1975 Mexico City	Shot put
Silver medal – second place	1979 San Juan	Shot put
Universiade
Gold medal – first place	1975 Rome	Shot put

Zbigniew "Bishop" Dolegiewicz (July 8, 1953 – October 29, 2008) was a Canadian professional track and field athlete and coach who specialized in the shot put and the discus throw.

A tall and muscular athlete, he won All-American honours while at the University of Texas and was the 1975 World University champion in the shot put. A silver medal at the 1975 Pan American Games was followed by his first Olympic appearance at the 1976 Summer Olympics in Montreal. He won a Commonwealth Games bronze on home turf in 1978 and also set a Canadian record of 20.83 m in the shot put that year.

He won a second Pan American medal in 1979 and began competing in the World's Strongest Man competition, highlighted by a fourth-place finish in 1980. He represented Canada at the first World Championships in Athletics in 1983, competing in the qualifying stage, and finished eleventh in the shot put final at the 1984 Olympic Games in Los Angeles – the best finish by a Canadian at the time. He retired in 1985 and moved into coaching, training throwers at the University of Saskatchewan and Southern Utah University.

A steroid user during much of his career, Dolegiewicz testified at the Dubin Inquiry in 1989, revealing that he had taken and distributed Dianabol. He sold the drug to Charlie Francis in 1981, who acquired it for his trainee Ben Johnson (the athlete whose failed test sparked the inquiry). Dolegiewicz also stated that he believed steroid use was so widespread in the throwing events that he could not name an individual who had not taken the drug. The comments to the governmental commission resulted in the loss of his Canadian shot record and his dismissal from his post at the University of Saskatchewan. He died in 2008 at the age of 55.

== Career ==
=== College and early years ===
Originally from Toronto, he began studying at the University of Texas in 1972 and ranked sixth in the shot put at the NCAA Men's Outdoor Track and Field Championship the next year. Muscular in build and standing at six foot six inches tall (1.98 m), he improved to fourth place at the following year's competition. During his time competing for the college's Texas Longhorns athletic team he earned All-American honours three times: outdoors in 1973–1974, and indoors in 1974. He began competing internationally in 1975 and won a gold medal at the 1975 World University Championships in Athletics before gaining a silver medal at the Pan American Games. In addition to this, he took national level honours with a win in the discus at the Canadian Athletics Championships.

=== Olympics and World Strongman ===
After winning the event at the 1976 French Athletics Championships, he was selected in the discus for the Canadian Olympic team for the 1976 Montreal Olympics. However, he fouled three times and ended his first major competition without a mark to his name. He won back-to-back national shot put titles in 1976–1977, but a year later he finished behind fellow Canadian Bruno Pauletto at both the Canadian championships and the 1978 Commonwealth Games in Edmonton, where Dolegiewicz took the bronze medal with a throw of 18.45 m. That year he achieved his personal best throw in the shot, tossing the metal ball a distance of 20.83 m – a Canadian record. Between 1976 and 1983, only he and Pauletto won the honour, with the pair dominating the Canadian national scene.

Dolegiewicz regained his national shot put title in 1979 with a championship record throw of 20.23 m and finished ahead of Pauletto to take the silver medal at the 1979 Pan American Games. He also represented the Americas team at the 1979 IAAF World Cup, where he finished in fifth place. In the next season he did not take part in the 1980 Summer Olympics, but instead competed at the 1980 World's Strongest Man competition. He gained 56 points in the strength events and finished in fourth, one place behind fellow thrower-cum-strongman Geoff Capes. He returned at the 1981 World's Strongest Man, but managed only tenth place on that occasion. On the athletics circuit that year he won a silver at the 1981 Pacific Conference Games, as well as another national title and fifth place at the 1981 IAAF World Cup.

==== Personal records ====
- Weight over bar – 25.5 kg (56 lb) over 5.18 metres (17 ft 0 in) (1980 World's Strongest Man) (Former World Record)

Dolegiewicz had begun to covertly use and sell anabolic steroids over this period. In mid-1981 he sold 500 tablets of Dianabol to track coach Charlie Francis, marking the beginning of sprinter Ben Johnson's drug use. The 1982 season saw him win his last national title in the shot put, but he also managed to win his first international medal in the discus that year, taking the bronze at the 1982 Commonwealth Games behind Bradley Cooper of the Bahamas and Rob Gray (Canada's number one in the event). The inaugural World Championships in Athletics was held in 1983 and Dolegiewicz was in attendance for Canada. However, neither he nor his compatriot Bruno Pauletto progressed past the qualification stage. Dolegiewicz also saw the opportunity to sell Dianabol at the international competition, and he brought along several hundred tablets of the drug on the trip to Helsinki. He also began supplying Mike Spiritosa, another Canadian thrower, with drugs over the period.

He gave his best Olympic performance at the 1984 Los Angeles Olympics, where he ranked eleventh in the shot put final of the competition. This was Canada's best ranking in the men's Olympic shot put until 2008. Dolegiewicz retired from the sport in 1985, feeling that it was inundated with drug users. With active competition behind him, he became a coach and took up a position at the University of Saskatchewan, later moving to Southern Utah University. Around this period he married a fellow throws athlete, Gale Zaphiropoulos who competed internationally for the United States, but the two later were divorced.

=== Role in Dubin Inquiry ===
The failed drug test of Canadian sprinter Ben Johnson at the 1988 Seoul Olympics sparked a national outcry and an investigation was launched into drug use within the sport – the Dubin Inquiry. Dolegiewicz testified as part of the governmental review. He admitted to distributing drugs and also his own personal usage, which spanned over a decade. Speaking before the commission, he estimated that half of the throwers at college level used steroids and said that among his peers on the global stage he "would be hard-pressed to find the name of an individual who hasn't used steroids".

His revelations cost him both his coaching role at the University of Saskatchewan and his Canadian shot put record. Among his statements, he also said that he looked upon his past steroid use with regret, noting that he had suffered mentally and physically as a direct result. While still working as a coach, he had used these experiences in order to warn the next generation of athletes of the dangers of drug use: "I give people the examples of individuals that I have known that have gotten sick from the use of steroids and I try to come across and give the kids the message, 'Look, you're going to pay the price at some point in time'".

He began to have circulatory and heart problems and on October 29, 2008, he died in his sleep at the age of 55. He was survived by his wife Anna Dolegiewicz – a former student of his – as well as his parents and a brother.
