= Vladimir Milić =

Serbian shot putter (born 1955)

Personal information
- Born: 23 October 1955 (age 70) Žegar, Yugoslavia

Sport
- Sport: Track and field
Medal record
Representing Yugoslavia
European Indoor Championships
Gold medal – first place	1982 Milan	Shot put
Mediterranean Games
Gold medal – first place	1979 Split	Shot Put
Bronze medal – third place	1983 Casablanca	Shot Put

Vladimir Milić (Serbian: Владимир Милић; born 23 October 1955) is a retired Serbian shot putter who represented SFR Yugoslavia.

He was born in Žegar, SR Croatia, but represented the club AK Crvena Zvezda in Belgrade. He won the gold medal at the 1982 European Indoor Championships, the gold medal at the 1979 Mediterranean Games and the bronze medal at the 1983 Mediterranean Games. He finished eighth at the 1980 Olympic Games, fourth at the 1982 European Championships, fifth at the 1983 European Indoor Championships, ninth at the 1983 World Championships, seventh at the 1986 European Championships, and seventh at the 1987 European Indoor Championships.

He became Balkan champion in 1986. He became Yugoslav shot put champion in 1976, 1978, 1979, 1980, 1985 and 1986, and also discus champion in 1976, 1977 and 1978.

His personal best throw was 21.19 metres, achieved in August 1982 in Belgrade. He was coached by Dragomir "Dragan" Petrović and Ivan Ivančić.

== See also ==
- Serbian records in athletics
