= Marco Montelatici =

Italian shot putter

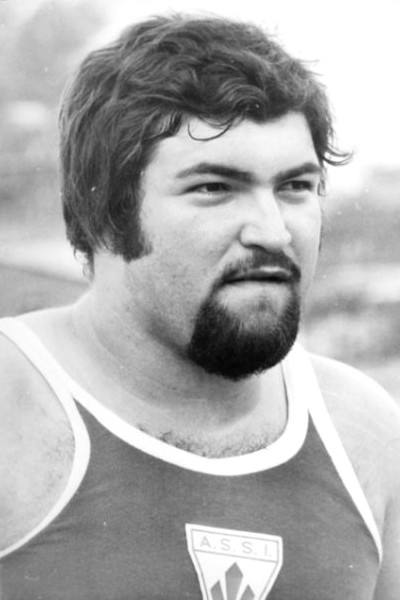
- Marco Montelatici in 1972

Personal information
- Nationality: Italian
- Born: 25 August 1953 (age 72) Florence, Italy
- Height: 1.86 m (6 ft 1 in)
- Weight: 108 kg (238 lb)

Sport
- Country: Italy
- Sport: Athletics
- Event: Shot put
- Club: Sisport Fiat Iveco

Achievements and titles
- Personal best: Shot put: 20.90 m (1989)
Medal record
European Indoor Championships
Bronze medal – third place	1986 Madrid	Shot put

Marco Montelatici (born 25 August 1953 in Florence) is a former shot putter from Italy.

== Biography ==
He competed for his native country at the 1984 Summer Olympics in Los Angeles, California, finishing in 6th place. Montelatici set his shot put personal best (20.90 metres) in the international event "Pasqua dell'Atleta" in 1985, improving the Italian national record set in 1979 by Bruno Pauletto.

== Achievements ==
Year	Competition	Venue	Position	Event	Performance	Note
1977	European Championships	(Spain) San Sebastián	Shot put	9th	18,62 m	
1978	European Championships	(Italy) Milan	Shot put	7th	19,27 m	
1982	European Championships	(Italy) Milan	Shot put	6th	18,99 m	
1984	Olympic Games	(United States) Los Angeles	Shot put	6th	19,98 m	
1985	World Indoor Games	(France) Paris	Shot put	6th	19.48 m	
1985	European Championships	(Greece) Pireus	Shot put	5th	19,64 m	
1986	European Championships	(Spain) Madrid	Shot put	3rd	20,11 m	

== National championships ==
Marco Montelatici has won 10 times the individual national championship.

- 5 wins in the shot put (1976, 1977, 1982, 1987, 1988)
- 5 wins in the shot put indoor (1973, 1977, 1978, 1984, 1986)

== See also ==
- Italian all-time lists - Shot put
- Italy national athletics team - More caps
