= Werner Günthör =

Swiss shot putter (born 1961)

Werner Gunthör
Personal information
- Nationality: Swiss
- Born: 1 June 1961 (age 65) Uttwil, Switzerland
- Height: 2.00 m (6 ft 7 in)
- Weight: 128 kg (282 lb)

Sport
- Country: Switzerland
- Sport: Athletics
- Event: Shot put

Achievements and titles
- Personal best: 22.75 m (1988)
Medal record
Men's athletics
Representing Switzerland
Olympic Games
Bronze medal – third place	1988 Seoul	Shot put
World Championships
Gold medal – first place	1987 Rome	Shot put
Gold medal – first place	1991 Tokyo	Shot put
Gold medal – first place	1993 Stuttgart	Shot put
World Indoor Championships
Gold medal – first place	1991 Seville	Shot put
European Championships
Gold medal – first place	1986 Stuttgart	Shot put

Werner Günthör (born 1 June 1961 in Uttwil) is a former Swiss track and field athlete, who was the best shot putter in the history of Swiss track and field.

== Biography ==
Günthör won three straight World Championships, 1987, 1991, and 1993, as well as one European Championship in 1986. At the 1988 Summer Olympics in Seoul he won the bronze medal.

His personal best throw, and Swiss record, was 22.75 metres, achieved in August 1988 in Bern.

The 2.00-metre-tall (6.56 ft) athlete also competed in the bobsleigh. He trained to be a sanitation installer but later completed study in sports and works today as a sport teacher and track and field coach. He is married and lives in Erlach.

== International competitions ==
Year	Competition	Venue	Position	Notes
Representing Switzerland
1983	World Championships	Helsinki, Finland	15th (q)	19.18 m
1984	European Indoor Championships	Gothenburg, Sweden	2nd	20.33 m
1984	Olympic Games	Los Angeles, United States	5th	20.28 m
1985	European Indoor Championships	Piraeus, Greece	3rd	21.23 m
1986	European Indoor Championships	Madrid, Spain	1st	21.51 m
1986	European Championships	Stuttgart, West Germany	1st	22.22 m
1987	European Indoor Championships	Liévin, France	2nd	21.53 m
1987	World Indoor Championships	Indianapolis, United States	2nd	21.61 m
1987	World Championships	Rome, Italy	1st	22.23 m
1988	Olympic Games	Seoul, South Korea	3rd	21.99 m
1989	World Cup	Barcelona, Spain	2nd	21.40 m^{1}
1991	World Indoor Championships	Seville, Spain	1st	21.17 m
1991	World Championships	Tokyo, Japan	1st	21.67 m
1992	Olympic Games	Barcelona, Spain	4th	20.91 m
1992	World Cup	Havana, Cuba	3rd	19.75 m^{1}
1993	World Championships	Stuttgart, Germany	1st	21.97 m

^{1}Representing Europe

Awards
Preceded by (Switzerland) Pirmin Zurbriggen	Swiss Sportsman of the Year; 1986 – 1987	Succeeded by (Switzerland) Hippolyt Kempf
Preceded by (Switzerland) Daniel Giubellini	Swiss Sportsman of the Year; 1991	Succeeded by (Switzerland) Tony Rominger
