= Dave Laut =

American shot putter

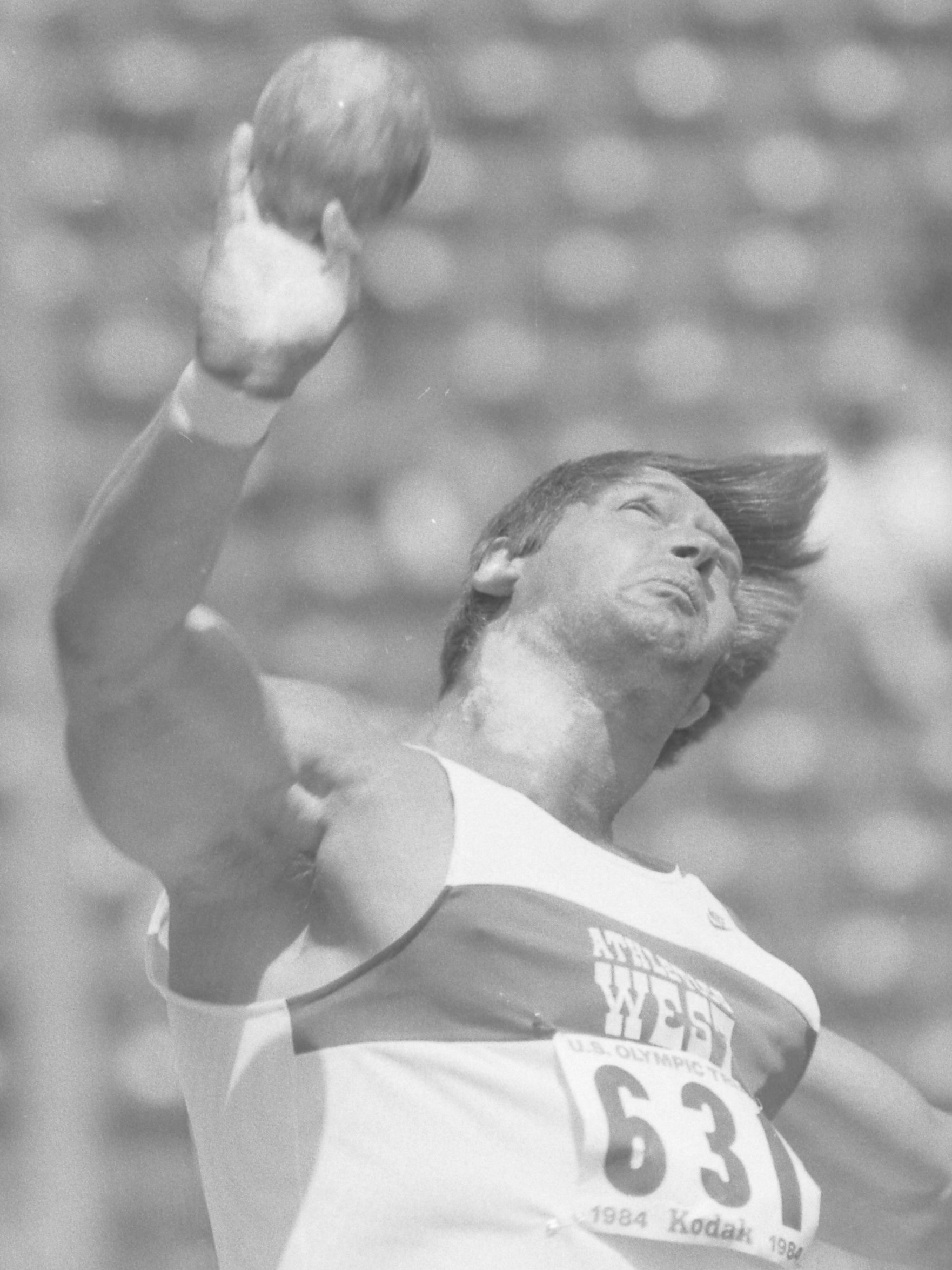
- Laut in 1984
- Born: December 21, 1956; Findlay, Ohio
- Died: August 27, 2009 (aged 52); Oxnard, California
- Occupations: Professional athlete and coach
- Sports career
- Event: Shot put
- College team: UCLA
Medal record
Men's athletics
Representing the United States
Olympic Games
Bronze medal – third place	1984 Los Angeles	Shot put
Pan American Games
Gold medal – first place	1979 San Juan	Shot put

David Lester Laut (December 21, 1956 – August 27, 2009) was an American shot putter. He was born in Findlay, Ohio, and grew up in Oxnard, California. Laut attended Art Haycox Elementary School, E. O. Green Junior High School, Santa Clara High School, Moorpark College (all in Ventura County), along with San Jose City College and UCLA, where he was a two-time NCAA champion and ranked No. 1 shot putter in the United States.

Laut was shot and killed at his home, and several years later his wife was convicted for the crime.

== Career ==
Laut won the bronze medal at the 1984 Summer Olympics in Los Angeles. He also won the gold medal at the 1979 Pan American Games and the bronze at the 1981 IAAF World Cup. He was the 1979, 1981, 1983 and 1985 United States champion in the shot put.

His personal best throw was 22.02 meters, achieved in August 1982 in Koblenz. In 1985, Laut was ranked No. 7 shot putter in the world and as the No. 1 American.

Laut tore tendons in both knees during an agility test to become a firefighter. He attempted to join the 1988 U.S. Olympic team, but fell short at the Olympic trials.

In 1997, he was named to the Ventura County Sports Hall of Fame.

After his retirement from being a professional shot putter, he became an assistant track coach at Ventura College in 1994. He served eight seasons as the track coach for Hueneme High School in the Oxnard Union High School District and was promoted to athletic director in 2008.

== Death ==
Laut died at his home in Oxnard, California, on August 27, 2009, after being shot several times in the head. He was 52 years old. His wife, Jane, was arrested more than five years later, and she claimed that she had shot Laut in self-defense. Clinical psychologist Katherine Emerick, who was treating Jane Laut for depression, testified that she had diagnosed Jane Laut with post traumatic stress disorder, anxiety, dependent personality disorder, and avoidant personality disorder. On March 30, 2016, she was convicted of first degree murder and sentenced to 50 years in prison. She had turned down a plea bargain for a six-year sentence.
