= Aulis Akonniemi =

Finnish shot putter (born 1958)

Aulis Juhani Akonniemi (born December 16, 1958) is a retired shot putter from Finland, born in Soini. He competed for his native country at the 1984 Summer Olympics, finishing in 9th place (18.98 metres) in the overall-standings.
