= Jānis Bojārs =

Latvian shot putter (1956–2018)

Personal information
- Born: 12 May 1956
- Died: 5 June 2018 (aged 62)
Medal record
Men's athletics
Representing the Soviet Union
European Championships
Silver medal – second place	1982 Athens	Shot put

Jānis Bojārs (12 May 1956 – 5 June 2018) was a Latvian male shot putter, best known for winning the silver medal for the Soviet Union in the men's shot put event at the 1982 European Championships in Athens, Greece. He set his personal best (21.74 m) on 14 July 1984 at a meet in Riga.
