= John Brenner (shot putter) =

American shot putter and discus thrower

Medal record

Men's Athletics

Representing United States

World Championships
Bronze medal – third place	1987 Rome	Shot Put

John Brenner (born January 4, 1961) is a retired shot putter from the United States. He was the 1986 and 1987 United States champion in the shot put.

Brenner competed collegiately for UCLA. He won the 1984 NCAA Championship in both the shot put and the discus throw. That year he set the collegiate national record record in the shot put at 21.92 m (71 ft 10 3/4 in) that lasted 11 years until it was surpassed by John Godina, also from UCLA, which is the current record.

With a personal best of 22.52 m (73 ft 10 1/2 in) from the 1987 Mt Sac Relays, an American Record at the time, as of June 2013, Brenner ranks as the ninth-best shot putter of all time.

John Brenner is noted for his upset of undefeated NCAA champion Michael Carter in his only loss in college competition. Carter, a two sport athlete who was also a Super Bowl winner in football, famously set an unprecedented high school national record in the shot put in 1979 which still stands. Second to him on that day by a difference of over seventeen feet was John Brenner, who would five years later defeat Carter as a college senior with an NCAA record and national title. Michael Carter would later go on to become the Olympic silver medalist later that year in Los Angeles, and win three Super Bowl rings as an All-Pro noseguard for the San Francisco 49ers.
