= Jan Sagedal =

Norwegian shot putter (born 1960)

Jan Sagedal (born 19 June 1960) is a retired Norwegian shot putter. He represented Froland IL, Sørild FIK and IK Tjalve.

== Biography ==
He finished fourteenth at the 1984 European Indoor Championships, thirteenth at the 1990 European Indoor Championships, thirteenth at the 1991 IAAF World Indoor Championships and ninth at the 1992 European Indoor Championships. He also competed at the World Championships in 1987 and 1991 without reaching the finals. He became Norwegian champion in 1986 and 1998.

His personal best throw was 20.76 metres (68.1 ft), achieved in June 1986 in Bodø. This would have been a new Norwegian record at the time if not Lars Arvid Nilsen put the shot 20.91 metres (68.6 ft) in Indianapolis the same day. Sagedal's result places him third among Norwegian shot putters through all time, behind Nilsen and Georg Andersen.

In 1987, Sagedal was found guilty of probenecid doping together with four other Norwegian shot putters. In 1992 he tested positive for methandienone, and was suspended for four years.
