= Georgi Todorov (shot putter) =

Georgi Yanev Todorov (Bulgarian: Георги Ванев Тодоров; born 7 March 1960 in Bolyarvo, Haskovo) is a retired Bulgarian shot putter.

He finished eighth at the 1987 European Indoor Championships and won the bronze medal at the 1988 European Indoor Championships He also competed at the 1987 World Championships and the 1988 Olympic Games without reaching the finals.

His personal best throw was 21.01 metres, achieved in September 1988 in Sofia. This is the current Bulgarian record.
