= Edward Sarul =

Polish shot putter (born 1958)

Medal record

Men's athletics

Representing Poland

World Championships
Gold medal – first place	1983 Helsinki	Shot put

European Cup
Gold medal – first place	1983 London	Shot put

Edward Sarul (born 16 November 1958) is a former Polish track and field athlete who competed in the shot put. He was the inaugural champion at the World Championships in Athletics in 1983. He also won the gold medal at the 1983 European Cup. A six-time Polish champion in the shot put, he held the Polish record for the event for twenty-six years (from 1983 to 2009) with his personal best of 21.68 metres.

== Career ==
Born in Jastrzębnik, he made his international debut as an under-20 athlete, finishing eighth at the 1977 European Athletics Junior Championships. He had his first successes at the Polish outdoor national championships, where he won the shot competition in 1979 and 1980. He lost his title to Janusz Gassowski the following year but rebounded in 1982, taking both the outdoor and indoor shot put titles. That year he finished eleventh at both the 1982 European Athletics Indoor Championships and the 1982 European Athletics Championships. He also extended his personal best over the 20-metre mark for the first time, closing the season with a best of 20.64 m set in Warsaw.

His career highlights occurred in 1983. He built upon his achievements from the past season with a 21.68 m national record throw in Sopot in July, taking him to twelfth place on the all-time lists. He won the shot title at the 1983 European Cup in London that summer, beating Ulf Timmermann. At the inaugural 1983 World Championships in Athletics he defied the more favoured East Germans, Udo Beyer and Timmermann, by leading the competition with an opening throw of 21.04 m. He then consolidated his lead with a throw of 21.39 m and won the gold medal to become the first ever shot put world champion. He came runner-up in the contest for Polish sportspersonality of the year for his achievement, finishing behind fellow track and field athlete Zdzisław Hoffmann who won the triple jump at the World Championships.

He remained in good form the following year, setting a season's best of 20.89 m in Seville, but was excluded from the 1984 Los Angeles Olympics as the competition was boycotted by the Eastern Bloc countries. His final major competition came in 1986: he won the Polish indoor title and represented his country at the 1986 European Athletics Indoor Championships, finishing in fifth place.

His personal best of 21.68 m stood as the Polish national record for the event from 1983 until 2009. It was beaten at the DN Galan meeting in July 2009 by the then reigning Olympic champion Tomasz Majewski, who greatly extended the mark with a throw of 21.95 m.

== Training style ==
Standing in direct contrast to sporting opinion at the time, Sarul believed that outright strength was not the most important factor in shot putting and that correct, natural technique was the key to good performances. He also used varying loads in weight training and recommended against repeatedly using heavy loads: "I believe that the strength required in the shot put is slightly different from that achieved with the barbell".

In training, he frequently used lighter shots than the typical 7 kg required for competition. He suggested that more generalised fitness training would be beneficial for younger throwing athletes, leaving strength training until their twenties, although he advocated perfecting technique from an early age. He demonstrated his superior lifting speed in trials for Dr. Bogdan Poprawski's paper Strength, Power and Speed in Shot Put Training at the Poznan Sport Institute.
