= Alessandro Andrei =

Italian shot putter (born 1959)

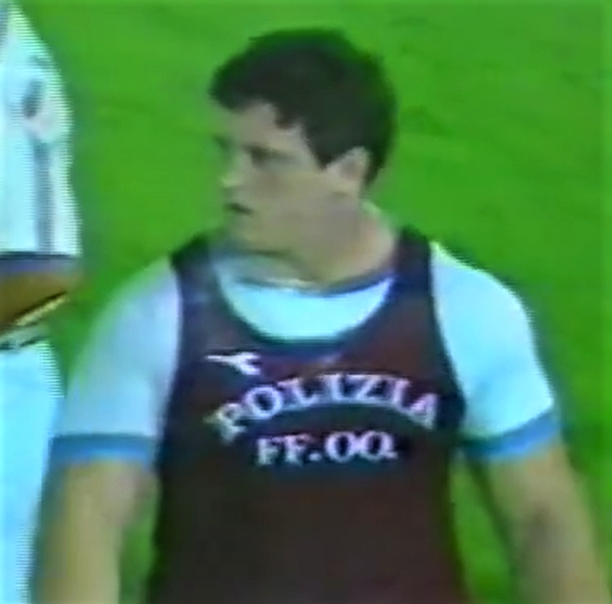
- Andrei in a competition in Italy in 1980s

Personal information
- Nationality: Italian
- Born: 3 January 1959 (age 67) Florence, Italy
- Height: 1.91 m (6 ft 3 in)
- Weight: 118 kg (260 lb)

Sport
- Country: Italy
- Sport: Athletics
- Event: Shot put
- Club: G.S. Fiamme Oro

Achievements and titles
- Personal best: 22.91 m (1987)
Medal record
Men's Athletics
Representing Italy
Olympic Games
Gold medal – first place	1984 Los Angeles	Shot Put
World Championships
Silver medal – second place	1987 Rome	Shot Put
European Indoor Championships
Bronze medal – third place	1984 Gothenburg	Shot Put
Mediterranean Games
Gold medal – first place	1991 Athens	Shot Put
Gold medal – first place	1997 Bari	Shot Put
Silver medal – second place	1983 Casablanca	Shot Put
Silver medal – second place	1993 Languedoc-Roussillon	Shot Put
Universiade
Silver medal – second place	1985 Kobe	Shot put

Alessandro Andrei (born 3 January 1959) is a retired Italian former shot putter. He was born in Florence.

== Biography ==
Andrei threw with his right hand, using the glide technique (at time many elite-level shot putters had switched to the spin/rotation style.) Andrei won the gold medal at the 1984 Summer Olympics held in Los Angeles, California. In 1987 he broke the world record three times in the same competition with successive throws of 22.72, 22.84 & 22.91 m (and finishing the sequence with a throw of 22.74 m). He was the first athlete in history to have a shot put series with all 6 throws over 22 meters, an accomplishment that wasn't repeated until 2020 by Ryan Crouser.

He is married to Agnese Maffeis.

== World record ==
- Shot put: 22.91 m - (Italy) Viareggio, 12 August 1987

Shots series

World record

1st	2nd	3rd	4th	5th	6th
22.19	22.37	22.72	22.84	22.91	22.74

== Achievements ==
Year	Competition	Venue	Position	Event	Measure	Notes
1983	Mediterranean Games	(Morocco) Casablanca	2nd	Shot put	19.61 m	
1983	World Championships	(Finland) Helsinki	5th	Shot put	20.07 m	
1984	European Indoor Championships	(Sweden) Gothenburg	3rd	Shot put	20.32 m	
1984	Olympic Games	(United States) Los Angeles	1st	Shot put	21.26 m	
1985	Universiade	(Japan) Kobe	2nd	Shot put	20.85 m	
1987	World Championships	(Italy) Rome	2nd	Shot put	21.88 m	
1991	Mediterranean Games	(Greece) Athens	1st	Shot put	19.38 m	
1993	Mediterranean Games	(France) Languedoc-Roussillon	2nd	Shot put	19.37 m	
1997	Mediterranean Games	(Italy) Bari	1st	Shot put	19.54 m	

== National titles ==
Andrei won 12 national championships at individual senior level.

- Italian Athletics Championships
  - Shot put: 1983, 1984, 1985, 1986, 1989, 1990, 1991, 1992 (8)
- Italian Athletics Indoor Championships
  - Shot put: 1985, 1990, 1991, 1992 (4)

== See also ==
- Shot put all-time top performer
- Men's shot put world record progression
- FIDAL Hall of Fame
- Italian all-time lists - Shot put
- Italy national athletics team - More caps
- List of Italian records in athletics
- List of Italian records in masters athletics

Records
Preceded by (East Germany) Udo Beyer	Men's Shot Put World Record Holder; 12 August 1987 – 22 May 1988	Succeeded by (East Germany) Ulf Timmermann
