= Ulf Timmermann =

East German shot putter

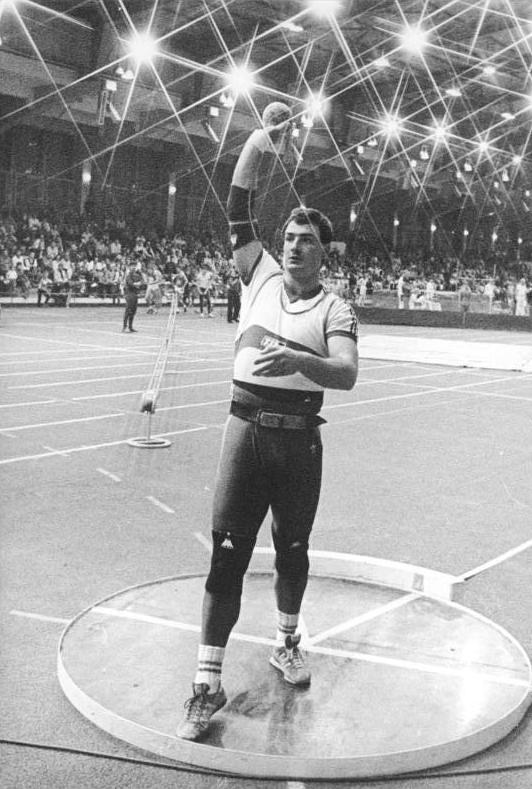
- Timmermann in 1989

Personal information
- Full name: Ulf Béla Timmermann
- Born: 1 November 1962 (age 63) East Berlin, East Germany
- Height: 194 cm (6 ft 4 in)
- Weight: 118 kg (260 lb)

Sport
- Country: East Germany (1981–1990); Germany (1991–1992)
- Sport: Athletics (track and field)
- Event: Shot put
- Club: Berliner TSC; OSC Berlin
- Coached by: Werner Goldmann

Achievements and titles
- Personal best: 23.06 m (1988)
Medal record
Men's athletics
Representing East Germany
Olympic Games
Gold medal – first place	1988 Seoul	Shot put
World Championships
Silver medal – second place	1983 Helsinki	Shot put
World Indoor Championships
Gold medal – first place	1987 Indianapolis	Shot put
Gold medal – first place	1989 Budapest	Shot put
European Championships
Gold medal – first place	1990 Split	Shot put
Silver medal – second place	1986 Stuttgart	Shot Put

Ulf Béla Timmermann (German pronunciation: [ʊlf ˈtɪmɐˌman], audio; born 1 November 1962 in East Berlin) is a retired German shot putter who broke the world record several times during the 1980s, and is the first and one of only four people to ever throw over 23 metres (along with Randy Barnes, Joe Kovacs and Ryan Crouser).

Timmermann was born in Berlin to an athletic family and took up shot put at 13. He broke his first world record in 1985 with a throw of 22.62 meters. On 22 May 1988 he became the first person to throw over 23 meters with a throw of 23.06 meters at Chania, Greece.

He won gold for East Germany at the 1988 Olympics in Seoul, ahead of Randy Barnes of the U.S. The fourth place throw at this competition would have won every previous Olympics in the shot put. At the 1992 Olympics, he represented Germany, but finished a disappointing fifth. He left competition afterwards.

Timmermann is the farthest thrower of all time in the shot put using the glide technique. He also passed 22 metres in 16 different competitions. His coach was Werner Goldmann who is currently coaching shot put and discus throw in Berlin.

== See also ==
- List of people from Berlin

Records
Preceded by Udo Beyer	Men's Shot Put World Record Holder; 22 September 1985 – 20 August 1986	Succeeded by Udo Beyer
Preceded by Alessandro Andrei	Men's Shot Put World Record Holder; 22 May 1988 – 20 May 1990	Succeeded by Randy Barnes
Preceded by Alessandro Andrei	Men's Shot Put European Record Holder; 22 May 1988 – Present	Succeeded by Incumbent
Olympic Games
Preceded by Kristina Richter	Flagbearer for East Germany; Seoul 1988	Succeeded by None
