= Udo Beyer =

East German shot putter (born 1955)

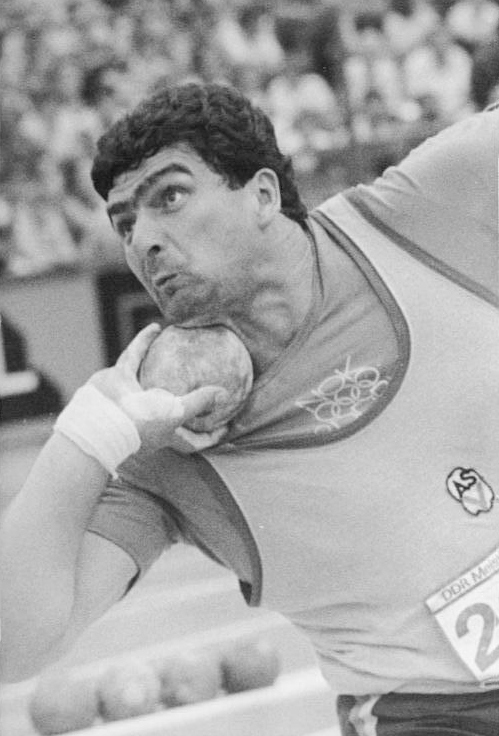
- Beyer in 1981

Personal information
- Born: 9 August 1955 (age 71) Stalinstadt, East Germany
- Height: 6 ft 4 1/2 in (1.94 m)
- Weight: 135 kg (298 lb)

Sport
- Country: East Germany (1973–1990); Germany (1991–1992)
- Sport: Athletics
- Event: Shot put
- Club: ASK Vorwärts Potsdam

Achievements and titles
- Personal best: 22.64 m (1986)
Medal record
Men's athletics
Representing East Germany
Olympic Games
| Gold medal – first place | 1976 Montreal | Shot put |
| Bronze medal – third place | 1980 Moscow | Shot put |
World Indoor Championships
| Silver medal – second place | 1985 Paris | Shot put |
European Championships
| Gold medal – first place | 1978 Prague | Shot put |
| Gold medal – first place | 1982 Athens | Shot put |
| Bronze medal – third place | 1986 Stuttgart | Shot put |
Summer Universiade
| Gold medal – first place | 1979 Mexico City | Shot put |

Udo Beyer (born 9 August 1955) is a former East German track and field athlete who competed in the shot put. Beyer has admitted to knowingly taking part in doping while he competed for East Germany. He was a Stasi informer under the codename "Kapitän".

== Biography ==
Beyer is the oldest of the six children of heating mechanic Hans-Georg Beyer and his wife Eva-Marie and was born in Stalinstadt, today Eisenhüttenstadt. He grew up in Breslack, (today the municipality of Neißemünde), and in Eisenhüttenstadt. Like all of his siblings, he played handball at the local sport club. He was a member of the team representing the district in Frankfurt where he became a successful goalkeeper. On the advice of his father he decided to pursue a sporting career, concentrating on athletics. After the youth tournament in 1969, he changed to the youth sports school in Frankfurt (Oder), where he earned his Abitur. At the same time he became a member of ASK Vorwärts Frankfurt.

In 1970 Ernst Kühl became his trainer, himself a successful shot putter and discus thrower for East Germany. Kühl had taken part in the 1960 and 1964 unified German team at the Summer Olympic games. In 1973 Beyer changed clubs as well as coaches moving to ASK Vorwärts Potsdam under Lothar Hillebrand. In Potsdam he concentrated solely on the shot put and began also studying at the university to become a physical education teacher. As a member of the Army sports club (ASK) Beyer was also a sports officer of the NVA and had also become Hauptmann (Captain) in the Bundeswehr. His sport career was essentially over after the 1988 Summer Olympic games, but his wife was able to convince him in 1990 to continue until 1992.

For many years, Beyer was captain of the East German athletics national team.

At a height of 1.94 meters, he weighed 130 kilograms. Even for a shot putter, Beyer was exceptionally strong.

At the end of his sport career, Beyer started work as a travel agent and has owned a travel agency in Potsdam since 1996. He lives in Potsdam and has been married since 1976 and has had two daughters, one of whom died as a child.

All of his siblings were very active in sports. At the Summer Olympics of 1980 in Moscow, Udo was with his sister Gisela Beyer and his brother Hans-Georg Beyer. All three reached their respective final rounds: Hans-Georg was Olympic champion with his handball team, Udo was third in the shot put and Gisela was fourth in the discus. His sister Gudrun was also with him at the 1992 Summer Olympics in Barcelona, as a physical therapist.

Since 2004 Beyer is also the "Chocolate Ambassador" for Germany's oldest chocolate factory, Halloren of Halle (Saale). He is also very active as an official representative for the "children's hospice of middle Germany" for terminally ill children and their families.

Beyer has admitted to knowingly taking part in doping while he competed for East Germany – which had a systematic doping program for its top athletes in the 1970s. His admission came in the documentary film The Lone Wolf, which was first shown in the 2013 Berlin Film Festival.

== Results ==
Together with his longtime East German teammate Ulf Timmermann, he dominated ten years of competitions in his discipline.

Olympic Games

- 1976 – Olympic Champion
- 1980 – Bronze medal
- 1984 – did not participate due to boycott
- 1988 – Fourth place
- 1992 – eliminated during qualification

Records World records:

1. 6 August 1978: 22.15 m
2. 25 July 1983: 22.22 m
3. 20 April 1986: 22.64 m

Junior-European records: 6.25 kg-shot (Junior-shot)

1. 13 July 1973: 21.03 m

7,26 kg-shot (Men's-shot)

1. 7 July 1973: 19.63 m
2. 6 July 1974: 20.20 m
3. 21 June 1975: 20.97 m (Current Record)

European-Championships

- 1973 – Junior-European champion
- 1974 – 8th place
- 1978 – European champion
- 1982 – European champion
- 1986 – Bronze medal
- 1974 – 6th place

IAAF-World cup, Shot put

- 1977, 1979 and 1981 – Winner

European cup, shot put

- 1977, 1979 and 1981 – Winner
- 1985 – 3rd place

East German-Championships

- 1974 – 2nd place
- 1977–1987 – GDR-champion (11 consecutive times)
- 1988 – 2nd place
- 1990 – 3rd place
- 1980 – GDR-Indoor champion

Children- and Youth Spartakiade

- 1972 – Spartakiade winner

== Honors ==
- 1978 – GDR Sportsman of the year
- 2 times patriotic earnings/service medal in Silver
- 7 times Champion of Sport

Records
| Preceded by Aleksandr Baryshnikov; Ulf Timmermann | Men's Shot Put World Record Holder; 6 July 1978 – 22 September 1985; 20 August 1986 – 12 August 1987 | Succeeded by Ulf Timmermann; Alessandro Andrei |
Awards
| Preceded by Rolf Beilschmidt | East German Sportsman of the Year; 1978 | Succeeded by Bernd Drogan |
