= List of Bulgarian Athletics Championships winners =

The Bulgarian Athletics Championships (Bulgarian: Българско първенство по лека атлетика) is an annual outdoor track and field competition organised by the Bulgarian Athletic Federation, which serves as the national championship for the sport in Bulgaria.

== Men ==
=== 100 metres ===
- 1960: Petar Manev
- 1961: Mikhail Bachvarov
- 1962: Mikhail Bachvarov
- 1963: Mikhail Bachvarov
- 1964: Konstantin Shipokliev
- 1965: Zhivko Traykov
- 1966: Konstantin Shipokliev
- 1967: Zhivko Traykov
- 1968: Zhivko Traykov
- 1969: Georgi Georgiev
- 1970: Georgi Yovchev
- 1971: Georgi Yovchev
- 1972: Georgi Georgiev
- 1973: Georgi Georgiev
- 1974: Petar Petrov
- 1975: Vladimir Ivanov
- 1976: Petar Petrov
- 1977: Petar Petrov
- 1978: Petar Petrov
- 1979: Petar Petrov
- 1980: Petar Petrov
- 1981: Ivaylo Karanyotov
- 1982: Valentin Atanasov
- 1983: Valentin Atanasov
- 1984: Bogomil Karadimov
- 1985: Valentin Atanasov
- 1986: Valentin Atanasov
- 1987: Valentin Atanasov
- 1988: Valentin Atanasov
- 1989: Nikolay Antonov
- 1990: Nikolay Antonov
- 1991: Valentin Atanasov
- 1992: Dimitar Pintev
- 1993: Radoslav Paskalev
- 1994: Stoyan Manolov
- 1995: Plamen Slavchev
- 1996: Radoslav Paskalev
- 1997: Khristo Khristov
- 1998: Radoslav Paskalev
- 1999: Petko Yankov
- 2000: Ruslan Rusidze (GEO)
- 2001: Petko Yankov
- 2002: Petko Yankov
- 2003: Marko Janković (SCG)
- 2004: Milen Tsvetanov
- 2005: Desislav Gunev
- 2006: Yordan Ilinov

=== 200 metres ===
- 1960: Dimitar Dimitrov
- 1961: Mikhail Bachvarov
- 1962: Mikhail Bachvarov
- 1963: Yordan Glukhchev
- 1964: Yordan Glukhchev
- 1965: Yordan Glukhchev
- 1966: Miroslav Lalov
- 1967: Todor Dyulgerov
- 1968: Trendafil Terziyski
- 1969: Trendafil Terziyski
- 1970: Dimcho Arnaoudov
- 1971: Todor Dyulgerov
- 1972: Georgi Georgiev
- 1973: Georgi Georgiev
- 1974: Petar Petrov
- 1975: Pavel Pavlov
- 1976: Petar Petrov
- 1977: Petar Petrov
- 1978: Pavel Pavlov
- 1979: Vladimir Ivanov
- 1980: Vladimir Ivanov
- 1981: Ivaylo Karanyotov
- 1982: Krasimir Sarbakov
- 1983: Bogomil Karadimov
- 1984: Bogomil Karadimov
- 1985: Yordan Vandov
- 1986: Nikolay Markov
- 1987: Nikolay Antonov
- 1988: Bogomil Karadimov
- 1989: Nikolay Antonov
- 1990: Nikolay Antonov
- 1991: Nikolay Antonov
- 1992: Anton Ivanov
- 1993: Tsvetoslav Stankoulov
- 1994: Stoyan Manolov
- 1995: Milen Nikolov
- 1996: Anton Ivanov
- 1997: Anton Ivanov
- 1998: Petko Yankov
- 1999: Aleksandar Petrov
- 2000: Milen Petrov
- 2001: Petko Yankov
- 2002: Petko Yankov
- 2003: Iliya Dzhivondov
- 2004: Yordan Ilinov
- 2005: Yordan Ilinov
- 2006: Yordan Ilinov

=== 400 metres ===
- 1960: Dimitar Dimitrov
- 1961: Dimitar Dimitrov
- 1962: Anton Antonov
- 1963: Zlatko Valchev
- 1964: Zlatko Valchev
- 1965: Zlatko Valchev
- 1966: Khristo Gergov
- 1967: Yordan Todorov
- 1968: Georgi Bozhkov
- 1969: Georgi Bozhkov
- 1970: Krastyo Khristov
- 1971: Krastyo Khristov
- 1972: Krastyo Khristov
- 1973: Nartsis Popov
- 1974: Marin Danov
- 1975: Vasil Kasov
- 1976: Nartsis Popov
- 1977: Nartsis Popov
- 1978: Nartsis Popov
- 1979: Nartsis Popov
- 1980: Nartsis Popov
- 1981: Toma Tomov
- 1982: Toma Tomov
- 1983: Toma Tomov
- 1984: Krasimir Demirev
- 1985: Dimitar Rangelov
- 1986: Momchil Kharizanov
- 1987: Dimitar Rangelov
- 1988: Dimitar Rangelov
- 1989: Toma Tomov
- 1990: Kiril Raykov
- 1991: Tsvetoslav Stankoulov
- 1992: Anton Ivanov
- 1993: Anton Ivanov
- 1994: Anton Ivanov
- 1995: Anton Ivanov
- 1996: Tsvetomir Marinov
- 1997: Anton Petrov
- 1998: Sevdalin Maksimov
- 1999: Iliya Dzhivondov
- 2000: Iliya Dzhivondov
- 2001: Iliya Dzhivondov
- 2002: Iliya Dzhivondov
- 2003: Plamen Ignatov
- 2004: Vladimir Kharalampiev
- 2005: Krasimir Braykov
- 2006: Krasimir Braykov

=== 800 metres ===
- 1960: Georgi Sapundzhiev
- 1961: Tsvyatko Spasov
- 1962: Tsvyatko Spasov
- 1963: Tsvyatko Spasov
- 1964: Yoncho Kalchev
- 1965: Angel Markov
- 1966: Yoncho Kalchev
- 1967: Zlatko Valchev
- 1968: Zlatko Valchev
- 1969: Zlatko Valchev
- 1970: Petar Kyatovski
- 1971: Atanas Atanasov
- 1972: Atanas Atanasov
- 1973: Petar Kyatovski
- 1974: Petar Kyatovski
- 1975: Venelin Stefanov
- 1976: Vladimir Kanev
- 1977: Moncho Marinov
- 1978: Binko Kolev
- 1979: Binko Kolev
- 1980: Anatoli Iliev
- 1981: Nikolay Cholakov
- 1982: Binko Kolev
- 1983: Binko Kolev
- 1984: Binko Kolev
- 1985: Boyko Trayanov
- 1986: Binko Kolev
- 1987: Sergei Mitov
- 1988: Miroslav Chochkov
- 1989: Miroslav Chochkov
- 1990: Miroslav Chochkov
- 1991: Dian Petkov
- 1992: Sergei Mitov
- 1993: Dian Petkov
- 1994: Dian Petkov
- 1995: Dian Petkov
- 1996: Dian Petkov
- 1997: Khristo Moisev
- 1998: Nikolay Nikov
- 1999: Khristo Moisev
- 2000: Khristo Moisev
- 2001: Vančo Stojanov (MKD)
- 2002: Vančo Stojanov (MKD)
- 2003: Vančo Stojanov (MKD)
- 2004: Vančo Stojanov (MKD)
- 2005: Boyan Kodinov
- 2006: Stefan Stefanov

=== 1500 metres ===
- 1960: Dimitar Angelov
- 1961: Dimitar Angelov
- 1962: Dimitar Angelov
- 1963: Dimitar Angelov
- 1964: Dimitar Angelov
- 1965: Dimitar Angelov
- 1966: Yoncho Kalchev
- 1967: Yoncho Kalchev
- 1968: Atanas Atanasov
- 1969: Atanas Atanasov
- 1970: Petko Yordanov
- 1971: Atanas Atanasov
- 1972: Atanas Atanasov
- 1973: Petar Kyatovski
- 1974: Veselin Tsanov
- 1975: Atanas Atanasov
- 1976: Vladimir Kanev
- 1977: Vladimir Kanev
- 1978: Vladimir Kanev
- 1979: Vladimir Kanev
- 1980: Vladimir Kanev
- 1981: Georgi Georgiev
- 1982: Evgeni Ignatov
- 1983: Ivan Angelkov
- 1984: Mustafa Mustafov
- 1985: Mladen Danailov
- 1986: Evgeni Ignatov
- 1987: Evgeni Ignatov
- 1988: Miroslav Chochkov
- 1989: Miroslav Chochkov
- 1990: Sergei Mitov
- 1991: Zhelyazko Zhelev
- 1992: Dian Petkov
- 1993: Khristo Stefanov
- 1994: Svetlin Prodanov
- 1995: Burgaz Yordanov
- 1996: Stanislav Lambev
- 1997: Stanislav Lambev
- 1998: Stanislav Lambev
- 1999: Stanislav Lambev
- 2000: Stanislav Lambev
- 2001: Vančo Stojanov (MKD)
- 2002: Stanislav Lambev
- 2003: Stanislav Lambev
- 2004: Stanislav Lambev
- 2005: Stefan Stefanov
- 2006: Emil Bozhanov

=== 5000 metres ===
- 1960: Ivan Peev
- 1961: Ventsislav Borisov
- 1962: Not held
- 1963: Lyuben Danailov
- 1964: Dimitar Angelov
- 1965: Slavei Florov
- 1966: Milen Tsonev
- 1967: Mikhail Markov
- 1968: Atanas Atanasov
- 1969: Mikhail Zhelev
- 1970: Mikhail Zhelev
- 1971: Georgi Tikhov
- 1972: Georgi Tikhov
- 1973: Petko Yordanov
- 1974: Petko Karpachev
- 1975: Atanas Atanasov
- 1976: Petko Yordanov
- 1977: Yordan Chilikov
- 1978: Detelin Maslov
- 1979: Vladimir Kanev
- 1980: Evgeni Ignatov
- 1981: Stanimir Nenov
- 1982: Evgeni Ignatov
- 1983: Panayot Kashanov
- 1984: Zdravko Todorov
- 1985: Evgeni Ignatov
- 1986: Evgeni Ignatov
- 1987: Evgeni Ignatov
- 1988: Evgeni Ignatov
- 1989: Evgeni Ignatov
- 1990: Evgeni Ignatov
- 1991: Evgeni Ignatov
- 1992: Borislav Danchev
- 1993: Khristo Stefanov
- 1994: Khristo Stefanov
- 1995: Yordan Dimitrov
- 1996: Ivan Chotov
- 1997: Khristo Stefanov
- 1998: Petko Stefanov
- 1999: Aleksandar Andonov
- 2000: Petko Stefanov
- 2001: Petko Stefanov
- 2002: Stanislav Lambev
- 2003: Khristo Khristov
- 2004: Nikolay Iliev
- 2005: Yolo Nikolov
- 2006: Ivaylo Ignatov

=== 10,000 metres ===
- 1960: Rayko Zdravkov
- 1961: Dimitar Vuchkov
- 1962: Ventsislav Borisov
- 1963: Dimitar Vuchkov
- 1964: Dimitar Vuchkov
- 1965: Dimitar Vuchkov
- 1966: Ivan Peev
- 1967: Milen Tsonev
- 1968: Mikhail Zhelev
- 1969: Georgi Tikhov
- 1970: Khristo Georgiev
- 1971: Petko Yordanov
- 1972: Georgi Tikhov
- 1973: Dinyo Dinev
- 1974: Atanas Barzanov
- 1975: Atanas Galabov
- 1976: Dinyo Dinev
- 1977: Yordan Chilikov
- 1978: Yordan Chilikov
- 1979: Petko Karpachev
- 1980: Petko Karpachev
- 1981: Rumen Mekhandzhiyski
- 1982: Petko Karpachev
- 1983: Rumen Mekhandzhiyski
- 1984: Rumen Mekhandzhiyski
- 1985: Rumen Mekhandzhiyski
- 1986: Emil Stoyanov
- 1987: Evgeni Ignatov
- 1988: Evgeni Ignatov
- 1989: Evgeni Ignatov
- 1990: Khristo Stefanov
- 1991: Evgeni Ignatov
- 1992: Evgeni Ignatov
- 1993: Ivan Chotov
- 1994: Khristo Stefanov
- 1995: Dimitar Dimitrov
- 1996: Petko Stefanov
- 1997: Khristo Stefanov
- 1998: Petko Stefanov
- 1999: Nikolay Marinov
- 2000: Petko Stefanov
- 2001: Petko Stefanov
- 2002: Nikolay Iliev
- 2003: Petko Stefanov
- 2004: Stanislav Lambev
- 2005: Stanislav Lambev
- 2006: Stanislav Lambev

=== Half marathon ===
- 1995: Dimitar Dimitrov
- 1996: Ivan Chotov
- 1997: Daniel Dukov
- 1998: Petko Stefanov
- 1999: Aleksandar Andonov
- 2000: Khristo Stefanov
- 2001: Petko Stefanov
- 2002: Petko Stefanov
- 2003: Petko Stefanov
- 2004: Ivan Chotov
- 2005: Stanislav Lambev
- 2006: Nikolay Iliev

=== Marathon ===
- 1960: Georgi Penchev
- 1961: Georgi Penchev
- 1962: Nikolay Solovyov
- 1963: Nikolay Solovyov
- 1964: Nikolay Solovyov
- 1965: Ivaylo Sharankov
- 1966: Ivaylo Sharankov
- 1967: Ivaylo Sharankov
- 1968: Yumer Bayramov
- 1969: Ivaylo Sharankov
- 1970: Khikmet Rasimov
- 1971: Khikmet Rasimov
- 1972: Ivaylo Sharankov
- 1973: Khristo Petrov
- 1974: Atanas Galabov
- 1975: Atanas Galabov
- 1976: Dinyo Dinev
- 1977: Atanas Galabov
- 1978: Vasil Lechev
- 1979: Yordan Chilikov
- 1980: Yordan Chilikov
- 1981: Yordan Chilikov
- 1982: Stanimir Nenov
- 1983: Stanimir Nenov
- 1984: Vasil Lechev
- 1985: Angel Zanev
- 1986: Stanimir Penchev
- 1987: Veselin Vasilev
- 1988: Stanimir Nenov
- 1989: Khristo Georgiev
- 1990: Vladimir Panovski
- 1991: Ivan Stoyanov
- 1992: Rangel Filipov
- 1993: Georgi Georgiev
- 1994: Petko Stefanov
- 1995: Georgi Georgiev
- 1996: Petko Stefanov
- 1997: Khristo Stefanov
- 1998: Boyko Zlatanov
- 1999: Petko Stefanov
- 2000: Petko Stefanov
- 2001: Petko Stefanov
- 2002: Petko Stefanov
- 2003: Petko Stefanov
- 2004: Petko Stefanov
- 2005: Aleksandar Panovski

=== 3000 metres steeplechase ===
- 1960: Ivan Peev
- 1961: Ivan Peev
- 1962: Nikolay Solovyov
- 1963: Ivan Peev
- 1964: Ivan Peev
- 1965: Ivan Peev
- 1966: Mikhail Zhelev
- 1967: Bozhidar Stefanov
- 1968: Mikhail Zhelev
- 1969: Mikhail Zhelev
- 1970: Mikhail Zhelev
- 1971: Georgi Tikhov
- 1972: Petko Yordanov
- 1973: Stoyan Shatov
- 1974: Mikhail Zhelev
- 1975: Petko Yordanov
- 1976: Petko Yordanov
- 1977: Petko Yordanov
- 1978: Zhivko Zapryanov
- 1979: Aleksandar Ognyanov
- 1980: Stanimir Nenov
- 1981: Panayot Kashanov
- 1982: Panayot Kashanov
- 1983: Panayot Kashanov
- 1984: Panayot Kashanov
- 1985: Panayot Kashanov
- 1986: Anton Tomov
- 1987: Panayot Kashanov
- 1988: Panayot Kashanov
- 1989: Panayot Kashanov
- 1990: Svetlin Strashilov
- 1991: Borislav Danchev
- 1992: Burgaz Yordanov
- 1993: Burgaz Yordanov
- 1994: Ventsislav Chavdarov
- 1995: Burgaz Yordanov
- 1996: Stefan Stanchev
- 1997: Burgaz Yordanov
- 1998: Katerin Stoilov
- 1999: Stefan Stefanov
- 2000: Georgi Georgiev
- 2001: Stefan Stefanov
- 2002: Georgi Georgiev
- 2003: Georgi Georgiev
- 2004: Georgi Georgiev
- 2005: Georgi Georgiev
- 2006: Stanislav Lambev

=== 110 metres hurdles ===
- 1960: Georgi Kaburov
- 1961: Petar Bozhinov
- 1962: Petar Bozhinov
- 1963: Petar Bozhinov
- 1964: Petar Bozhinov
- 1965: Petar Bozhinov
- 1966: Petar Bozhinov
- 1967: Krasimir Petkov
- 1968: Ilia Iliev
- 1969: Slavcho Dimitrov
- 1970: Slavcho Dimitrov
- 1971: Slavcho Dimitrov
- 1972: Slavcho Dimitrov
- 1973: Slavcho Dimitrov
- 1974: Georgi Mlyakov
- 1975: Georgi Mlyakov
- 1976: Georgi Mlyakov
- 1977: Vasko Nedyalkov
- 1978: Plamen Krastev
- 1979: Vasko Nedyalkov
- 1980: Plamen Krastev
- 1981: Plamen Krastev
- 1982: Plamen Krastev
- 1983: Ventsislav Radev
- 1984: Plamen Krastev
- 1985: Plamen Krastev
- 1986: Plamen Krastev
- 1987: Plamen Krastev
- 1988: Plamen Krastev
- 1989: Zhelyazko Zhelyazkov
- 1990: Georgi Georgiev
- 1991: Georgi Georgiev
- 1992: Georgi Georgiev
- 1993: Georgi Georgiev
- 1994: Georgi Georgiev
- 1995: Vasil Frangov
- 1996: Zhivko Videnov
- 1997: Zhivko Videnov
- 1998: Zhivko Videnov
- 1999: Zhivko Videnov
- 2000: Nikolay Koykov
- 2001: Nikolay Koykov
- 2002: Zhivko Videnov
- 2003: Kosta Angelov
- 2004: Kosta Angelov
- 2005: Rumen Lóczi (HUN)
- 2006: Yavor Lochov & Zlatan Petrov

=== 200 metres hurdles ===
- 1969: Slavcho Dimitrov
- 1970: Slavcho Dimitrov
- 1971: Rayko Krastev
- 1972: Slavcho Dimitrov
- 1973: Slavcho Dimitrov
- 1974: Slavcho Dimitrov

=== 400 metres hurdles ===
- 1960: Aleksandar Chenger
- 1961: Dimitar Dimitrov
- 1962: Dimitar Dimitrov
- 1963: Vladimir Tabakov
- 1964: Vladimir Tabakov
- 1965: Vladimir Tabakov
- 1966: Khristo Gergov
- 1967: Khristo Gergov
- 1968: Khristo Gergov
- 1969: Khristo Gergov
- 1970: Khristo Gergov
- 1971: Khristo Gergov
- 1972: Yanko Bratanov
- 1973: Yanko Bratanov
- 1974: Yanko Bratanov
- 1975: Yordan Yordanov
- 1976: Slavcho Dimitrov
- 1977: Slavcho Dimitrov
- 1978: Yanko Bratanov
- 1979: Yanko Bratanov
- 1980: Slavcho Dimitrov
- 1981: Krasimir Demirev
- 1982: Krasimir Demirev
- 1983: Krasimir Demirev
- 1984: Toma Tomov
- 1985: Toma Tomov
- 1986: Toma Tomov
- 1987: Toma Tomov
- 1988: Toma Tomov
- 1989: Krasimir Demirev
- 1990: Toma Tomov
- 1991: Krasimir Demirev
- 1992: Assen Markov
- 1993: Plamen Nyagin
- 1994: Plamen Nyagin
- 1995: Plamen Nyagin
- 1996: Plamen Nyagin
- 1997: Plamen Nyagin
- 1998: Plamen Nyagin
- 1999: Boril Varidanov
- 2000: Plamen Nyagin
- 2001: Iliya Dzhivondov
- 2002: Iliya Dzhivondov
- 2003: Stanislav Petkov
- 2004: Stanislav Petkov
- 2005: Rumen Lóczi (HUN)
- 2006: Stanislav Petkov

=== High jump ===
- 1960: Georgi Koumanov
- 1961: Georgi Koumanov
- 1962: Georgi Koumanov
- 1963: Evgeni Yordanov
- 1964: Evgeni Yordanov
- 1965: Evgeni Yordanov
- 1966: Evgeni Yordanov
- 1967: Georgi Koumanov
- 1968: Evgeni Yordanov
- 1969: Petar Bogdanov
- 1970: Petar Bogdanov
- 1971: Petar Bogdanov
- 1972: Petar Bogdanov
- 1973: Petar Bogdanov
- 1974: Peycho Zhekov
- 1975: Peycho Zhekov
- 1976: Ivan Iliev
- 1977: Ivan Boychev
- 1978: Rumen Yotsov
- 1979: Rumen Yotsov
- 1980: Atanas Mladenov
- 1981: Georgi Gadzhev
- 1982: Atanas Mladenov
- 1983: Rumen Yotsov
- 1984: Georgi Gadzhev
- 1985: Valentin Gatov
- 1986: Georgi Dakov
- 1987: Georgi Dakov
- 1988: Georgi Dakov
- 1989: Kotzo Kostov
- 1990: Georgi Dakov
- 1991: Georgi Dakov
- 1992: Robert Marinov
- 1993: Robert Marinov
- 1994: Dimitar Toychev
- 1995: Ivan Ivanov
- 1996: Georgi Getov
- 1997: Metin Dormushev
- 1998: Metin Dormushev
- 1999: Ivan Varbanov
- 2000: Angel Kararadev
- 2001: Angel Kararadev
- 2002: Georgi Getov
- 2003: Georgi Getov
- 2004: Georgi Getov
- 2005: Stoyan Kekov
- 2006: Stefan Altanov

=== Pole vault ===
- 1960: Khristo Khristov
- 1961: Dimitar Khlebarov
- 1962: Dimitar Khlebarov
- 1963: Dimitar Khlebarov
- 1964: Dimitar Khlebarov
- 1965: Dimitar Khlebarov
- 1966: Dimitar Khlebarov
- 1967: Velko Velkov
- 1968: Dimitar Khlebarov
- 1969: Nikolay Kenanov
- 1970: Dimitar Khlebarov
- 1971: Dimitar Khlebarov
- 1972: Ivan Minkov
- 1973: Veselin Tsonev
- 1974: Ivan Minkov
- 1975: Veselin Tsonev
- 1976: Atanas Tarev
- 1977: Atanas Tarev
- 1978: Atanas Tarev
- 1979: Atanas Tarev
- 1980: Atanas Tarev
- 1981: Atanas Tarev
- 1982: Atanas Tarev
- 1983: Atanas Tarev
- 1984: Atanas Tarev
- 1985: Atanas Tarev
- 1986: Atanas Tarev
- 1987: Nikolay Nikolov
- 1988: Atanas Tarev
- 1989: Delko Lesev
- 1990: Galin Nikov
- 1991: Nikolay Nikolov
- 1992: Galin Nikov
- 1993: Delko Lesev
- 1994: Iliyan Efremov
- 1995: Iliyan Efremov
- 1996: Khristo Kuzov
- 1997: Khristo Kuzov
- 1998: Iliyan Efremov
- 1999: Marin Karailiev
- 2000: Iliyan Efremov
- 2001: Spas Bukhalov
- 2002: Iliyan Efremov
- 2003: Iliyan Efremov
- 2004: Iliyan Efremov
- 2005: Iliyan Efremov
- 2006: Iliyan Efremov

=== Long jump ===
- 1960: Stoyan Slavkov
- 1961: Raycho Tsonev
- 1962: Raycho Tsonev
- 1963: Raycho Tsonev
- 1964: Raycho Tsonev
- 1965: Raycho Tsonev
- 1966: Raycho Tsonev
- 1967: Tseno Manchev
- 1968: Raycho Tsonev
- 1969: Todor Tsoutsekov
- 1970: Georgi Marin
- 1971: Georgi Marin
- 1972: Plamen Penchev
- 1973: Boncho Bonev
- 1974: Yordan Yanev
- 1975: Georgi Chavdarov
- 1976: Emilio Benekov
- 1977: Plamen Penchev
- 1978: Ivan Tuparov
- 1979: Georgi Doynov
- 1980: Ivan Tuparov
- 1981: Atanas Chochev
- 1982: Ivan Tuparov
- 1983: Atanas Chochev
- 1984: Ivan Tuparov
- 1985: Atanas Chochev
- 1986: Atanas Chochev
- 1987: Vladimir Amidzhinov
- 1988: Vladimir Amidzhinov
- 1989: Daniel Ivanov
- 1990: Atanas Atanasov
- 1991: Ivan Stoyanov
- 1992: Galin Georgiev
- 1993: Ivaylo Mladenov
- 1994: Ivaylo Mladenov
- 1995: Galin Georgiev
- 1996: Nikolay Antonov
- 1997: Stanislav Georgiev
- 1998: Nikolay Atanasov
- 1999: Nikolay Atanasov
- 2000: Petar Dachev
- 2001: Nikolay Atanasov
- 2002: Petar Dachev
- 2003: Petar Dachev
- 2004: Nikolay Atanasov
- 2005: Atanas Rusenov
- 2006: Nikolay Atanasov

=== Triple jump ===
- 1960: Dodyu Patarinski
- 1961: Lyuben Gourgoushinov
- 1962: Dodyu Patarinski
- 1963: Lyuben Gourgoushinov
- 1964: Georgi Stoykovski
- 1965: Georgi Stoykovski
- 1966: Georgi Stoykovski
- 1967: Dodyu Patarinski
- 1968: Georgi Stoykovski
- 1969: Georgi Stoykovski
- 1970: Georgi Stoykovski
- 1971: Georgi Stoykovski
- 1972: Nikolay Mikovski
- 1973: Kiril Aladzhov
- 1974: Kiril Aladzhov
- 1975: Mikhail Mikhalev
- 1976: Mikhail Mikhalev
- 1977: Georgi Georgiev
- 1978: Georgi Georgiev
- 1979: Atanas Chochev
- 1980: Atanas Chochev
- 1981: Veselin Stoykov
- 1982: Krasimir Dzhaldeti
- 1983: Georgi Pomashki
- 1984: Khristo Markov
- 1985: Khristo Markov
- 1986: Khristo Markov
- 1987: Khristo Markov
- 1988: Khristo Markov
- 1989: Nikolay Avramov
- 1990: Emil Ivanov
- 1991: Angel Shikov
- 1992: Angel Shikov
- 1993: Kotzo Kostov
- 1994: Kotzo Kostov
- 1995: Galin Georgiev
- 1996: Kotzo Kostov
- 1997: Nikolay Raev
- 1998: Nikolay Raev
- 1999: Ivaylo Rusenov
- 2000: Ivaylo Rusenov
- 2001: Vasil Gergov
- 2002: Yuri Litvinski
- 2003: Ivaylo Rusenov
- 2004: Momchil Karailiev
- 2005: Momchil Karailiev
- 2006: Zhivko Petkov

=== Shot put ===
- 1960: Boris Kaleev
- 1961: Boris Kaleev
- 1962: Boris Kaleev
- 1963: Boris Kaleev
- 1964: Boris Kaleev
- 1965: Valcho Ivanov
- 1966: Spas Dzhurov
- 1967: Todor Artarski
- 1968: Tencho Gospodinov
- 1969: Tencho Gospodinov
- 1970: Tencho Gospodinov
- 1971: Mikhail Kyoshev
- 1972: Valcho Stoev
- 1973: Valcho Stoev
- 1974: Valcho Stoev
- 1975: Mikhail Kyoshev
- 1976: Nikola Khristov
- 1977: Nikola Khristov
- 1978: Nikola Khristov
- 1979: Valcho Stoev
- 1980: Valcho Stoev
- 1981: Nikola Khristov
- 1982: Nikola Khristov
- 1983: Nikolay Gemizhev
- 1984: Nikolay Gemizhev
- 1985: Ventsislav Khristov
- 1986: Georgi Todorov
- 1987: Georgi Todorov
- 1988: Georgi Todorov
- 1989: Ventsislav Khristov
- 1990: Georgi Todorov
- 1991: Ventsislav Khristov
- 1992: Radoslav Despotov
- 1993: Radoslav Despotov
- 1994: Radoslav Despotov
- 1995: Kiril Valchanov
- 1996: Radoslav Despotov
- 1997: Miroslav Kostov
- 1998: Ventsislav Velichkov
- 1999: Miroslav Kostov
- 2000: Galin Kostadinov
- 2001: Krasimir Aleksandrov
- 2002: Krasimir Aleksandrov
- 2003: Galin Kostadinov
- 2004: Galin Kostadinov
- 2005: Galin Kostadinov
- 2006: Galin Kostadinov

=== Discus throw ===
- 1960: Todor Artarski
- 1961: Dimitar Milev
- 1962: Todor Artarski
- 1963: Todor Artarski
- 1964: Georgi Damyanov
- 1965: Todor Artarski
- 1966: Georgi Gyurov
- 1967: Todor Artarski
- 1968: Todor Artarski
- 1969: Todor Artarski
- 1970: Todor Artarski
- 1971: Todor Artarski
- 1972: Velko Velev
- 1973: Velko Velev
- 1974: Velko Velev
- 1975: Emil Vladimirov
- 1976: Velko Velev
- 1977: Velko Velev
- 1978: Velko Velev
- 1979: Velko Velev
- 1980: Emil Vladimirov
- 1981: Emil Vladimirov
- 1982: Velislav Prokhaska
- 1983: Velko Velev
- 1984: Velko Velev
- 1985: Georgi Georgiev
- 1986: Kamen Dimitrov
- 1987: Kamen Dimitrov
- 1988: Georgi Georgiev
- 1989: Georgi Georgiev
- 1990: Nikolay Kolev
- 1991: Georgi Georgiev
- 1992: Nikolay Kolev
- 1993: Kamen Dimitrov
- 1994: Iliyan Iliev
- 1995: Iliyan Iliev
- 1996: Iliyan Iliev
- 1997: Kiril Angelov
- 1998: Iliyan Manolov
- 1999: Miroslav Kostov
- 2000: Encho Shterev
- 2001: Ivan Stanev
- 2002: Encho Shterev
- 2003: Encho Shterev
- 2004: Encho Shterev
- 2005: Encho Shterev
- 2006: Encho Shterev

=== Hammer throw ===
- 1960: Vasil Kroumov
- 1961: Vasil Kroumov
- 1962: Vasil Kroumov
- 1963: Vasil Kroumov
- 1964: Vasil Kroumov
- 1965: Vasil Kroumov
- 1966: Valcho Ivanov
- 1967: Valcho Ivanov
- 1968: Dimitar Mindov
- 1969: Dimitar Mindov
- 1970: Dimitar Mindov
- 1971: Dimitar Mindov
- 1972: Dimitar Mindov
- 1973: Todor Manolov
- 1974: Dimitar Mindov
- 1975: Dimitar Mindov
- 1976: Todor Manolov
- 1977: Emanuil Dyulgerov
- 1978: Emanuil Dyulgerov
- 1979: Dragomir Angelov
- 1980: Emanuil Dyulgerov
- 1981: Emanuil Dyulgerov
- 1982: Emanuil Dyulgerov
- 1983: Emanuil Dyulgerov
- 1984: Ivan Tanev
- 1985: Plamen Minev
- 1986: Emanuil Dyulgerov
- 1987: Viktor Apostolov
- 1988: Ivan Tanev
- 1989: Plamen Minev
- 1990: Plamen Minev
- 1991: Ivan Tanev
- 1992: Ivan Tanev
- 1993: Petar Tsvetanov
- 1994: Plamen Minev
- 1995: Plamen Minev
- 1996: Plamen Minev
- 1997: Plamen Minev
- 1998: Mladen Dimitrov
- 1999: Andrian Andreev
- 2000: Andrian Andreev
- 2001: Rosen Zhelev
- 2002: Andrian Andreev
- 2003: Rosen Zhelev
- 2004: Rosen Zhelev
- 2005: Andrian Andreev
- 2006: Andrian Andreev

=== Javelin throw ===
- 1960: Mityu Dichev
- 1961: Stoyo Pavlov
- 1962: Mityu Dichev
- 1963: Mityu Dichev
- 1964: Stoyo Pavlov
- 1965: Mityu Dichev
- 1966: Petar Rousev
- 1967: Mityu Dichev
- 1968: Milcho Milenski
- 1969: Ivan Pavlov
- 1970: Milcho Milenski
- 1971: Milcho Milenski
- 1972: Milcho Milenski
- 1973: Dinyo Dinev
- 1974: Valentin Dzhonev
- 1975: Kosta Denishev
- 1976: Valentin Dzhonev
- 1977: Stefan Stoykov
- 1978: Valentin Dzhonev
- 1979: Stefan Stoykov
- 1980: Valentin Dzhonev
- 1981: Ivan Angelov
- 1982: Stefan Stoykov
- 1983: Stefan Stoykov
- 1984: Raycho Dimitrov
- 1985: Raycho Dimitrov
- 1986: Emil Tsvetanov
- 1987: Emil Tsvetanov
- 1988: Emil Tsvetanov
- 1989: Emil Tsvetanov
- 1990: Emil Tsvetanov
- 1991: Angel Mandzhukov
- 1992: Georgi Stambolski
- 1993: Emil Tsvetanov
- 1994: Angel Mandzhukov
- 1995: Angel Mandzhukov
- 1996: Angel Mandzhukov
- 1997: Emil Tsvetanov
- 1998: Mikhail Kostov
- 1999: Mikhail Kostov
- 2000: Angel Mandzhukov
- 2001: Kolyo Neshev
- 2002: Kolyo Neshev
- 2003: Mikhail Kostov
- 2004: Mikhail Kostov
- 2005: Kolyo Neshev
- 2006: Kolyo Neshev

=== Decathlon ===
- 1960: Stoyan Slavkov
- 1961: Stoyan Slavkov
- 1962: Stoyan Slavkov
- 1963: Stoyan Slavkov
- 1964: Stoyan Slavkov
- 1965: Spas Dzhurov
- 1966: Spas Dzhurov
- 1967: Spas Dzhurov
- 1968: Not held
- 1969: Yordan Mlyakov
- 1970: Spas Dzhurov
- 1971: Spas Dzhurov
- 1972: Yordan Mlyakov
- 1973: Spas Dzhurov
- 1974: Yordan Mlyakov
- 1975: Rumen Petrov
- 1976: Rumen Petrov
- 1977: Atanas Andonov
- 1978: Atanas Andonov
- 1979: Atanas Andonov
- 1980: Razvigor Yankov
- 1981: Atanas Andonov
- 1982: Tsetsko Mitrakiev
- 1983: Tsetsko Mitrakiev
- 1984: Tsetsko Mitrakiev
- 1985: Tsetsko Mitrakiev
- 1986: Tsetsko Mitrakiev
- 1987: Tsetsko Mitrakiev
- 1988: Borislav Kolev
- 1989: Georgi Arnaoudov
- 1990: Asen Aleksandrov
- 1991: Georgi Arnaoudov
- 1992: Krasimir Petlichki
- 1993: Krasimir Petlichki
- 1994: Krasimir Petlichki
- 1995: Krasimir Petlichki
- 1996: Georgi Petrov
- 1997: Dimitar Georgiev
- 1998: Boris Vodenizharov
- 1999: Vladislav Iliev
- 2000: Marin Karailiev
- 2001: Miroslav Shishkov
- 2002: Angel Kararadev
- 2003: Kaloyan Kirov
- 2004: Kiril Osev
- 2005: Borislav Borisov
- 2006: Borislav Borisov

=== 10,000 metres walk ===
The 1985 event was held as a road race.

- 1967: Stanimir Stoykov
- 1968: ?
- 1969: ?
- 1970: ?
- 1971: Stefan Tsoukev
- 1972: ?
- 1973: Stefan Tsoukev
- 1974: Georgi Georgiev
- 1975: ?
- 1976: Stefan Tsoukev
- 1977: Evgeni Semerdzhiev
- 1978: Lyubomir Ivanov
- 1979: ?
- 1980: Yancho Kamenov
- 1981: Alik Ibriamov
- 1982: Lyubomir Ivanov
- 1983: Lyubomir Ivanov
- 1984: Lyubomir Ivanov
- 1985: Lyubomir Ivanov
- 1986: Todor Todorov
- 1987: Lyubomir Ivanov
- 1988: Lyubomir Ivanov
- 1989: Lyubomir Ivanov
- 1990: Valentin Kolev
- 1991: Lyubomir Ivanov
- 1992: Valentin Andreev
- 1993: Avni Hasan Bekir
- 1994: Lyubomir Ivanov
- 1995: Lyubomir Ivanov
- 1996: Avni Hasan Bekir
- 1997: Lyubomir Ivanov
- 1998: Kaloyan Vasilev
- 1999: Kaloyan Vasilev
- 2000: Todor Ivanov
- 2001: Ivaylo Minkov
- 2002: Angel Kararadev

=== 20 kilometres walk ===
- 1965: Dimitar Marinov
- 1966: Stanimir Stoykov
- 1967: Stanimir Stoykov
- 1968: ?
- 1969: ?
- 1970: ?
- 1971: Zhivko Stanev
- 1972: Stefan Tsoukev
- 1973: Klement Pachev
- 1974: Evgeni Semerdzhiev
- 1975: Klement Pachev
- 1976: Evgeni Semerdzhiev
- 1977: Evgeni Semerdzhiev
- 1978: Evgeni Semerdzhiev
- 1979: Yancho Kamenov
- 1980: Yancho Kamenov
- 1981: Alik Ibriamov
- 1982: Lyubomir Ivanov
- 1983: Alik Ibriamov
- 1984: Lyubomir Ivanov
- 1985: Lyubomir Ivanov
- 1986: Lyubomir Ivanov
- 1987: Lyubomir Ivanov
- 1988: Lyubomir Ivanov
- 1989: Lyubomir Ivanov
- 1990: Valentin Kolev
- 1991: Valentin Andreev
- 1992: Valentin Andreev
- 1993: Avni Hasan Bekir
- 1994: Avni Hasan Bekir
- 1995: Not held
- 1996: Avni Hasan Bekir
- 1997: Lyubomir Ivanov
- 1998: Avni Hasan Bekir
- 1999: Avni Hasan Bekir
- 2000: Tenyo Georgiev
- 2001: Ivaylo Minkov
- 2002: Avni Hasan Bekir
- 2003: Ivaylo Minkov
- 2004: Georgi Georgiev
- 2005: Georgi Georgiev
- 2006: Georgi Georgiev

=== 30 kilometres walk ===
- 1992: Valentin Andreev

=== 50 kilometres walk ===
- 1966: Dimitar Marinov
- 1967: Stanimir Stoykov
- 1968: ?
- 1969: ?
- 1970: ?
- 1971: Stanimir Stoykov
- 1972: Ivan Georgiev
- 1973: Svetoslav Garkov
- 1974: Yancho Kamenov
- 1975: Yancho Kamenov
- 1976: Yancho Kamenov
- 1977: Klement Pachev
- 1978: Yancho Kamenov
- 1979: Yancho Kamenov
- 1980: Yancho Kamenov
- 1981: Yancho Kamenov
- 1982: Valentin Kralev
- 1983: Roberto Iliev
- 1984: Ravil Ibriamov
- 1985: Roberto Iliev
- 1986: Boncho Lapkov
- 1987: Boncho Lapkov
- 1988: Mario Marinov
- 1989: Lyubomir Ivanov

=== Cross country (long course) ===
- 1965: Ivan Peev
- 1966: Georgi Tikhov
- 1967: Mikhail Zhelev
- 1968: Mikhail Zhelev
- 1969: Georgi Tikhov
- 1970: ?
- 1971: Georgi Tikhov
- 1972: Mikhail Zhelev
- 1973: Petko Yordanov
- 1974: Dinyo Dinev
- 1975: Petko Yordanov
- 1976: Petko Yordanov
- 1977: Veselin Andonov
- 1978: Veselin Andonov
- 1979: Yordan Chilikov
- 1980: Stanimir Nenov
- 1981: Stanimir Nenov
- 1982: Yordan Chilikov
- 1983: Petko Karpachev
- 1984: Angel Zanev
- 1985: Georgi Georgiev
- 1986: ?
- 1987: ?
- 1988: Evgeni Ignatov
- 1989: ?
- 1990: ?
- 1991: Borislav Danchev
- 1992: Borislav Danchev
- 1993: ?
- 1994: ?
- 1995: Ivan Chotov
- 1996: Dimitar Dimitrov
- 1997: Ivan Chotov
- 1998: Ivan Chotov
- 1999: Stanislav Lambev
- 2000: Dimitar Dimitrov
- 2001: ?
- 2002: Aleksandar Andonov
- 2003: Stanislav Lambev
- 2004: Stanislav Lambev
- 2005: Stanislav Lambev

=== Cross country (short course) ===
- 1965: Georgi Tikhov
- 1966: Mikhail Markov
- 1967: Mikhail Markov
- 1968: ?
- 1969: ?
- 1970: ?
- 1971: ?
- 1972: ?
- 1973: ?
- 1974: Vladimir Kanev
- 1975: Veselin Tsanov
- 1976: ?
- 1977: Angel Zanev
- 1978: Oleg Zdravkov
- 1979: Sasho Angelov
- 1980: ?
- 1981: Vasil Stoimenov
- 1982: ?
- 1983: ?
- 1984: Khristo Georgiev
- 1985: Borislav Danchev
- 1986: ?
- 1987: ?
- 1988: ?
- 1989: ?
- 1990: ?
- 1991: Ivan Ivanov
- 1992: ?
- 1993: ?
- 1994: ?
- 1995: ?
- 1996: ?
- 1997: ?
- 1998: ?
- 1999: ?
- 2000: ?
- 2001: ?
- 2002: ?
- 2003: ?
- 2004: Ivaylo Ignatov
- 2005: Ivaylo Ignatov

== Women ==
=== 100 metres ===
- 1960: Yanka Tomova
- 1961: Tsvetana Isaeva
- 1962: Veselina Kolarova
- 1963: Veselina Kolarova
- 1964: Snezhana Kerkova
- 1965: Snezhana Kerkova
- 1966: Antoaneta Dzhoubrilova
- 1967: Snezhana Dzhalova
- 1968: Monka Bobcheva
- 1969: Ivanka Valkova
- 1970: Ivanka Valkova
- 1971: Yordanka Yankova
- 1972: Ivanka Valkova
- 1973: Yordanka Yankova
- 1974: Yordanka Yankova
- 1975: Lilyana Panayotova
- 1976: Lilyana Panayotova
- 1977: Maria Stoyanova
- 1978: Lilyana Ivanova
- 1979: Lilyana Ivanova
- 1980: Maria Shishkova
- 1981: Galina Penkova
- 1982: Nadezhda Georgieva
- 1983: Nadezhda Georgieva
- 1984: Nadezhda Georgieva
- 1985: Pepa Pavlova
- 1986: Anelia Nuneva
- 1987: Anelia Nuneva
- 1988: Anelia Nuneva
- 1989: Nadezhda Georgieva
- 1990: Tsvetanka Ilieva
- 1991: Nadezhda Georgieva
- 1992: Anelia Nuneva
- 1993: Petya Pendareva
- 1994: Desislava Dimitrova
- 1995: Zlatka Georgieva
- 1996: Nora Ivanova
- 1997: Petya Pendareva
- 1998: Desislava Dimitrova
- 1999: Magdalena Khristova
- 2000: Monika Gachevska
- 2001: Monika Gachevska
- 2002: Ekaterina Mashova
- 2003: Monika Gachevska
- 2004: Ivet Lalova
- 2005: Ivet Lalova
- 2006: Tezdzhan Naimova

=== 200 metres ===
- 1960: Yanka Tomova
- 1961: Stefka Novakova
- 1962: Stefka Novakova
- 1963: Veselina Kolarova
- 1964: Snezhana Kerkova
- 1965: Veselina Kolarova
- 1966: Donka Markova
- 1967: Snezhana Dzhalova
- 1968: Snezhana Dzhalova
- 1969: Ivanka Koshnicharska
- 1970: Monka Bobcheva
- 1971: Ivanka Venkova
- 1972: Ivanka Valkova
- 1973: Ivanka Valkova
- 1974: Lilyana Panayotova
- 1975: Lilyana Panayotova
- 1976: Yordanka Ivanova
- 1977: Ivanka Valkova
- 1978: Lilyana Ivanova
- 1979: Lilyana Ivanova
- 1980: Galina Penkova
- 1981: Galina Penkova
- 1982: Nadezhda Georgieva
- 1983: Nadezhda Georgieva
- 1984: Nadezhda Georgieva
- 1985: Pepa Pavlova
- 1986: Anelia Nuneva
- 1987: Anelia Nuneva
- 1988: Nadezhda Georgieva
- 1989: Milena Saracheva
- 1990: Tsvetanka Ilieva
- 1991: Tsvetanka Ilieva
- 1992: Anelia Nuneva
- 1993: Petya Pendareva
- 1994: Zlatka Georgieva
- 1995: Zlatka Georgieva
- 1996: Monika Gachevska
- 1997: Monika Gachevska
- 1998: Monika Gachevska
- 1999: Antonia Yakimova
- 2000: Monika Gachevska
- 2001: Monika Gachevska
- 2002: Ekaterina Mashova
- 2003: Monika Gachevska
- 2004: Ivet Lalova
- 2005: Tezdzhan Naimova
- 2006: Monika Ivanova

=== 400 metres ===
- 1960: Tsvetana Isaeva
- 1961: Tsvetana Isaeva
- 1962: Tsvetana Isaeva
- 1963: Violeta Beneva
- 1964: Stefka Novakova
- 1965: Stefka Novakova
- 1966: Vasilena Amzina
- 1967: Lilyana Tomova
- 1968: Lilyana Tomova
- 1969: Lilyana Tomova
- 1970: Stefka Yordanova
- 1971: Svetla Zlateva
- 1972: Lilyana Tomova
- 1973: Lilyana Tomova
- 1974: Nikolina Shtereva
- 1975: Zdravka Trifonova
- 1976: Svetla Zlateva
- 1977: Violeta Tsvetkova
- 1978: Totka Petrova
- 1979: Svobodka Damyanova
- 1980: Malena Andonova
- 1981: Ivanka Venkova
- 1982: Kalinka Dragova
- 1983: Katya Ilieva
- 1984: Rositsa Stamenova
- 1985: Rositsa Stamenova
- 1986: Pepa Pavlova
- 1987: Yuliana Marinova
- 1988: Rositsa Stamenova
- 1989: Milena Saracheva
- 1990: Yuliana Teneva
- 1991: Yuliana Teneva
- 1992: Yuliana Teneva
- 1993: Yuliana Marinova
- 1994: Daniela Spasova
- 1995: Petya Strashilova
- 1996: Eliza Todorova
- 1997: Petya Strashilova
- 1998: Petya Strashilova
- 1999: Antonia Yakimova
- 2000: Daniela Georgieva
- 2001: Nedyalka Nedkova
- 2002: Nedyalka Nedkova
- 2003: Nedyalka Nedkova
- 2004: Mariyana Dimitrova
- 2005: Mariyana Dimitrova
- 2006: Teodora Kolarova

=== 800 metres ===
- 1960: Tsvetana Isaeva
- 1961: Kipra Danailova
- 1962: Kipra Danailova
- 1963: Vasilena Amzina
- 1964: Stanka Mladenova
- 1965: Kipra Danailova
- 1966: Vasilena Amzina
- 1967: Vasilena Amzina
- 1968: Vasilena Amzina
- 1969: Tonka Petrova
- 1970: Tonka Petrova
- 1971: Tonka Petrova
- 1972: Lilyana Tomova
- 1973: Svetla Zlateva
- 1974: Nikolina Shtereva
- 1975: Rumyana Chavdarova
- 1976: Nikolina Shtereva
- 1977: Totka Petrova
- 1978: Totka Petrova
- 1979: Nikolina Shtereva
- 1980: Vesela Yatsinska
- 1981: Nikolina Shtereva
- 1982: Nikolina Shtereva
- 1983: Totka Petrova
- 1984: Svobodka Damyanova
- 1985: Nikolina Shtereva
- 1986: Nikolina Shtereva
- 1987: Anushka Dimitrova
- 1988: Nikolina Shtereva
- 1989: Nikolina Shtereva
- 1990: Petya Strashilova
- 1991: Petya Strashilova
- 1992: Petya Strashilova
- 1993: Petya Strashilova
- 1994: Petya Strashilova
- 1995: Petya Strashilova
- 1996: Olga Zheleva
- 1997: Petya Strashilova
- 1998: Petya Strashilova
- 1999: Desislava Stoyanova
- 2000: Yoanna Parusheva
- 2001: Tsvetelina Kirilova
- 2002: Evelina Danailova
- 2003: Ralitsa Atanasova
- 2004: Teodora Kolarova
- 2005: Teodora Kolarova
- 2006: Teodora Kolarova

=== 1500 metres ===
- 1968: Vasilena Amzina
- 1969: Vasilena Amzina
- 1970: Vasilena Amzina
- 1971: Vasilena Amzina
- 1972: Dzhena Stefanova
- 1973: Svetla Zlateva
- 1974: Rumyana Chavdarova
- 1975: Rumyana Chavdarova
- 1976: Vesela Yatsinska
- 1977: Totka Petrova
- 1978: Rumyana Chavdarova
- 1979: Totka Petrova
- 1980: Nikolina Shtereva
- 1981: Vania Gospodinova
- 1982: Vesela Yatsinska
- 1983: Totka Petrova
- 1984: Vania Stoyanova
- 1985: Nikolina Shtereva
- 1986: Nikolina Shtereva
- 1987: Anushka Dimitrova
- 1988: Radka Naplatanova
- 1989: Radka Naplatanova
- 1990: Galina Goranova
- 1991: Petya Strashilova
- 1992: Petya Strashilova
- 1993: Petya Strashilova
- 1994: Petya Strashilova
- 1995: Olga Zheleva
- 1996: Olga Zheleva
- 1997: Olga Zheleva
- 1998: Evelina Danailova
- 1999: Daniela Yordanova
- 2000: Yoanna Parusheva
- 2001: Yoanna Parusheva
- 2002: Evelina Danailova
- 2003: Dobrinka Shalamanova
- 2004: Dobrinka Shalamanova
- 2005: Vania Koleva Stoyanova
- 2006: Natalia Drumeva

=== 3000 metres ===
- 1976: Rumyana Chavdarova
- 1977: Rumyana Chavdarova
- 1978: Rumyana Chavdarova
- 1979: Vesela Yatsinska
- 1980: Rumyana Chavdarova
- 1981: Vesela Yatsinska
- 1982: Rumyana Chavdarova
- 1983: Radka Naplatanova
- 1984: Radka Naplatanova
- 1985: Nedka Keremedchieva
- 1986: Katya Krasteva
- 1987: Radka Naplatanova
- 1988: Radka Naplatanova
- 1989: Radka Naplatanova
- 1990: Galina Goranova
- 1991: Radka Naplatanova
- 1992: Galina Goranova
- 1993: Galina Goranova
- 1994: Milka Mikhailova

=== 5000 metres ===
- 1995: Milka Mikhailova
- 1996: Galina Goranova
- 1997: Radka Naplatanova
- 1998: Daniela Yordanova
- 1999: Yordanka Yankova
- 2000: Milka Mikhailova
- 2001: Milka Mikhailova
- 2002: Rumyana Panovska
- 2003: Milka Mikhailova
- 2004: Milka Mikhailova
- 2005: Vania Koleva Stoyanova
- 2006: Milka Mikhailova

=== 10,000 metres ===
- 1983: Rumyana Chavdarova
- 1984: Nedyalka Bakalova
- 1985: Nedka Keremedchieva
- 1986: Nikolina Shtereva
- 1987: Radka Naplatanova
- 1988: Radka Naplatanova
- 1989: Radka Naplatanova
- 1990: Galina Goranova
- 1991: Gergana Voynova
- 1992: Gergana Voynova
- 1993: Rumyana Panovska
- 1994: Milka Mikhailova
- 1995: Galina Goranova
- 1996: Galina Goranova
- 1997: Radka Naplatanova
- 1998: Milka Mikhailova
- 1999: Milka Mikhailova
- 2000: Milka Mikhailova
- 2001: Rumyana Panovska
- 2002: Rumyana Panovska
- 2003: Milka Mikhailova
- 2004: Milka Mikhailova
- 2005: Milka Mikhailova
- 2006: Daniela Yordanova

=== Half marathon ===
- 1995: Galina Goranova
- 1996: Galina Goranova
- 1997: Galina Goranova
- 1998: Daniela Yordanova
- 1999: Milka Mikhailova
- 2000: Milka Mikhailova
- 2001: Rumyana Panovska
- 2002: Milka Mikhailova
- 2003: Milka Mikhailova
- 2004: Rumyana Panovska
- 2005: Vania Koleva
- 2006: Dobrinka Shalamanova

=== Marathon ===
- 1981: Nedyalka Bakalova
- 1982: Nedyalka Bakalova
- 1983: Nedyalka Bakalova
- 1984: Nedyalka Bakalova
- 1985: Nevena Khristova
- 1986: Rositsa Tsoneva
- 1987: Rumyana Ruseva
- 1988: Rumyana Ruseva
- 1989: Rumyana Ruseva
- 1990: Stoyka Gandurova
- 1991: Gergana Voynova
- 1992: Gergana Voynova
- 1993: Gergana Voynova
- 1994: Gergana Voynova
- 1995: Gergana Voynova
- 1996: Rumyana Panovska
- 1997: Gergana Voynova
- 1998: Ivelina Kalcheva
- 1999: Rumyana Panovska
- 2000: Rumyana Panovska
- 2001: Milka Mikhailova
- 2002: Milka Mikhailova
- 2003: Rumyana Panovska
- 2004: Rumyana Panovska
- 2005: Milka Mikhailova

=== 3000 metres steeplechase ===
- 2002: Rumyana Panovska
- 2003: Rumyana Panovska
- 2004: Ralitsa Atanasova
- 2005: Dobrinka Shalamanova
- 2006: Yonka Aleksandrova

=== 80 metres hurdles ===
- 1960: Snezhana Kerkova
- 1961: Snezhana Kerkova
- 1962: Verka Angelova
- 1963: Snezhana Kerkova
- 1964: Snezhana Kerkova
- 1965: Snezhana Kerkova
- 1966: Snezhana Dzhalova
- 1967: Snezhana Dzhalova
- 1968: Snezhana Dzhalova

=== 100 metres hurdles ===
- 1968: Tsvetana Andreeva
- 1969: Dimitrina Koleva
- 1970: Nedyalka Angelova
- 1971: Ivanka Koshnicharska
- 1972: Ivanka Koshnicharska
- 1973: Ivanka Koshnicharska
- 1974: Penka Sokolova
- 1975: Penka Sokolova
- 1976: Penka Sokolova
- 1977: Lidia Gusheva
- 1978: Lidia Gusheva
- 1979: Daniela Teneva
- 1980: Yordanka Donkova
- 1981: Daniela Valkova
- 1982: Yordanka Donkova
- 1983: Ginka Zagorcheva
- 1984: Yordanka Donkova
- 1985: Ginka Zagorcheva
- 1986: Yordanka Donkova
- 1987: Ginka Zagorcheva
- 1988: Svetla Dimitrova
- 1989: Ginka Zagorcheva
- 1990: Ginka Zagorcheva
- 1991: Diana Ruskova
- 1992: Svetla Dimitrova
- 1993: Svetla Dimitrova
- 1994: Yordanka Donkova
- 1995: Svetla Dimitrova
- 1996: Yurka Khristova
- 1997: Silvia Penkova
- 1998: Svetla Dimitrova
- 1999: Svetla Damova
- 2000: Gergana Stoyanova
- 2001: Yana Kasova
- 2002: Desislava Mutafchieva
- 2003: Desislava Mutafchieva
- 2004: Desislava Mutafchieva
- 2005: Desislava Mutafchieva
- 2006: Desislava Mutafchieva

=== 200 metres hurdles ===
- 1969: Ivanka Koshnicharska
- 1970: Ivanka Koshnicharska
- 1971: Ivanka Koshnicharska
- 1972: Ivanka Koshnicharska
- 1973: Krasimira Filipova
- 1974: Ivanka Yovcheva
- 1975: Krasimira Filipova

=== 400 metres hurdles ===
- 1976: Velichka Marinova
- 1977: Zlatina Ilieva
- 1978: Yordanka Ivanova
- 1979: Bonka Dimova
- 1980: Bonka Dimova
- 1981: Nadezhda Asenova
- 1982: Nadezhda Asenova
- 1983: Nadezhda Asenova
- 1984: Nadezhda Asenova
- 1985: Nadezhda Asenova
- 1986: Bonka Peneva
- 1987: Bonka Peneva
- 1988: Bonka Peneva
- 1989: Teodora Khristova
- 1990: Emilia Bachvarova
- 1991: Yordanka Stoyanova
- 1992: Yordanka Stoyanova
- 1993: Valya Demireva
- 1994: Daniela Spasova
- 1995: Eliza Tsvetanova
- 1996: Rositsa Milenova
- 1997: Elena Koleva
- 1998: Tsvetelina Kirilova
- 1999: Desislava Stoyanova
- 2000: Desislava Stoyanova
- 2001: Vania Stambolova
- 2002: Vania Stambolova
- 2003: Mariyana Dimitrova
- 2004: Mariyana Dimitrova
- 2005: Vania Stambolova
- 2006: Vania Stambolova

=== High jump ===
- 1960: Tsvetana Vasileva
- 1961: Genoveva Cherkezova
- 1962: Anka Rouseva
- 1963: Anka Rouseva
- 1964: Vesa Koleva
- 1965: Yordanka Blagoeva
- 1966: Snezhana Yurukova
- 1967: Katya Lazova
- 1968: Yordanka Blagoeva
- 1969: Yordanka Blagoeva
- 1970: Katya Lazova
- 1971: Katya Lazova
- 1972: Yordanka Blagoeva
- 1973: Yordanka Blagoeva
- 1974: Stanka Valkanova
- 1975: Yordanka Blagoeva
- 1976: Stanka Valkanova
- 1977: Yordanka Blagoeva
- 1978: Tatyana Kamareva
- 1979: Yordanka Blagoeva
- 1980: Yordanka Blagoeva
- 1981: Lyudmila Andonova
- 1982: Lyudmila Andonova
- 1983: Silvia Koeva
- 1984: Lyudmila Andonova
- 1985: Stefka Kostadinova
- 1986: Stefka Kostadinova
- 1987: Stefka Kostadinova
- 1988: Stefka Kostadinova
- 1989: Rosanel Gogi
- 1990: Svetlana Leseva
- 1991: Stefka Kostadinova
- 1992: Lyudmila Andonova
- 1993: Eleonora Milusheva
- 1994: Eleonora Milusheva
- 1995: Venelina Veneva
- 1996: Stefka Kostadinova
- 1997: Khristina Kalcheva
- 1998: Khristina Kalcheva
- 1999: Eleonora Milusheva
- 2000: Eleonora Milusheva
- 2001: Eleonora Milusheva
- 2002: Eleonora Milusheva
- 2003: Maria Nikolova
- 2004: Venelina Veneva
- 2005: Elena Denkova
- 2006: Maria Nikolova

=== Pole vault ===
- 1995: Tania Koleva
- 1996: Not held
- 1997: Tania Koleva
- 1998: Iva Vasileva
- 1999: Vera Chavdarova
- 2000: Tania Koleva
- 2001: Vera Chavdarova
- 2002: Vera Chavdarova
- 2003: Vera Chavdarova
- 2004: Vera Chavdarova
- 2005: Tania Stefanova
- 2006: Vera Chavdarova

=== Long jump ===
- 1960: Diana Yorgova
- 1961: Diana Yorgova
- 1962: Diana Yorgova
- 1963: Diana Yorgova
- 1964: Diana Yorgova
- 1965: Diana Yorgova
- 1966: Diana Yorgova
- 1967: Ivanka Tikhova
- 1968: Ivanka Koshnicharska
- 1969: Diana Yorgova
- 1970: Nedyalka Angelova
- 1971: Diana Yorgova
- 1972: Diana Yorgova
- 1973: Lilyana Panayotova
- 1974: Penka Sokolova
- 1975: Penka Sokolova
- 1976: Lilyana Panayotova
- 1977: Ekaterina Nedeva
- 1978: Lidia Gusheva
- 1979: Daniela Valkova
- 1980: Ekaterina Nedeva
- 1981: Ivanka Venkova
- 1982: Lidia Gusheva
- 1983: Vangelia Ilieva
- 1984: Lyudmila Ninova
- 1985: Silvia Khristova
- 1986: Lyudmila Ninova
- 1987: Lyudmila Ninova
- 1988: Tsetska Kancheva
- 1989: Ivanka Valkova
- 1990: Sofia Bozhanova
- 1991: Sofia Bozhanova
- 1992: Iva Prandzheva
- 1993: Yurka Khristova
- 1994: Shasmina Nikolova
- 1995: Iliyana Ilieva
- 1996: Magdalena Khristova
- 1997: Antonia Stoyanova
- 1998: Magdalena Khristova
- 1999: Magdalena Khristova
- 2000: Mariya Dimitrova
- 2001: Antonia Yordanova
- 2002: Antonia Yordanova
- 2003: Antonia Yordanova
- 2004: Antonia Yordanova
- 2005: Darinka Yotova
- 2006: Antonia Yordanova

=== Triple jump ===
- 1990: Sofia Bozhanova
- 1991: Sofia Bozhanova
- 1992: Dimitrinka Stoyanova
- 1993: Iva Prandzheva
- 1994: Mariya Dimitrova
- 1995: Venelina Veneva
- 1996: Tereza Marinova
- 1997: Zlatka Radukanova
- 1998: Tereza Marinova
- 1999: Mariya Dimitrova
- 2000: Iva Prandzheva
- 2001: Mariya Dimitrova
- 2002: Eliza Todorova
- 2003: Nina Serbezova
- 2004: Mariya Dimitrova
- 2005: Mariya Dimitrova
- 2006: Tereza Marinova

=== Shot put ===
- 1960: Tsvetana Asenova
- 1961: Ivanka Khristova
- 1962: Ivanka Khristova
- 1963: Ivanka Khristova
- 1964: Ivanka Khristova
- 1965: Ivanka Khristova
- 1966: Ivanka Khristova
- 1967: Lidia Sharamovich
- 1968: Ivanka Khristova
- 1969: Ivanka Khristova
- 1970: Ivanka Khristova
- 1971: Ivanka Khristova
- 1972: Ivanka Khristova
- 1973: Ivanka Khristova
- 1974: Ivanka Khristova
- 1975: Ruska Dzhendova
- 1976: Elena Stoyanova
- 1977: Elena Stoyanova
- 1978: Ivanka Stoycheva
- 1979: Ivanka Stoycheva
- 1980: Verzhinia Veselinova
- 1981: Verzhinia Veselinova
- 1982: Verzhinia Veselinova
- 1983: Snezhana Vasileva
- 1984: Svetla Mitkova
- 1985: Svetla Mitkova
- 1986: Svetla Mitkova
- 1987: Svetla Mitkova
- 1988: Verzhinia Veselinova
- 1989: Verzhinia Veselinova
- 1990: Svetla Mitkova
- 1991: Svetla Mitkova
- 1992: Svetla Mitkova
- 1993: Svetla Mitkova
- 1994: Svetla Mitkova
- 1995: Svetla Mitkova
- 1996: Svetla Mitkova
- 1997: Svetla Mitkova
- 1998: Svetla Mitkova
- 1999: Anelia Yordanova
- 2000: Anelia Yordanova
- 2001: Anelia Yordanova
- 2002: Anelia Kumanova
- 2003: Anelia Kumanova
- 2004: Anelia Kumanova
- 2005: Radoslava Mavrodieva
- 2006: Galina Ivanova

=== Discus throw ===
- 1960: Verzhinia Mikhailova
- 1961: Verzhinia Mikhailova
- 1962: Verzhinia Mikhailova
- 1963: Verzhinia Mikhailova
- 1964: Verzhinia Mikhailova
- 1965: Verzhinia Mikhailova
- 1966: Ivanka Khristova
- 1967: Vasilka Stoeva
- 1968: Vasilka Stoeva
- 1969: Vasilka Stoeva
- 1970: Vasilka Stoeva
- 1971: Vasilka Stoeva
- 1972: Radostina Vasekova
- 1973: Vasilka Stoeva
- 1974: Maria Vergova
- 1975: Radostina Bakhchevanova
- 1976: Maria Vergova
- 1977: Maria Vergova
- 1978: Svetla Bozhkova
- 1979: Svetla Bozhkova
- 1980: Svetla Bozhkova
- 1981: Mariya Petkova
- 1982: Mariya Petkova
- 1983: Svetla Mitkova
- 1984: Mariya Petkova
- 1985: Tsvetanka Khristova
- 1986: Tsvetanka Khristova
- 1987: Tsvetanka Khristova
- 1988: Tsvetanka Khristova
- 1989: Tsvetanka Khristova
- 1990: Svetla Mitkova
- 1991: Tsvetanka Khristova
- 1992: Stefania Simova
- 1993: Svetla Mitkova
- 1994: Atanaska Angelova
- 1995: Atanaska Angelova
- 1996: Atanaska Angelova
- 1997: Tsvetanka Khristova
- 1998: Svetla Mitkova
- 1999: Venera Getova
- 2000: Venera Getova
- 2001: Tsvetanka Khristova
- 2002: Venera Getova
- 2003: Venera Getova
- 2004: Tsvetanka Khristova
- 2005: Tsvetanka Khristova
- 2006: Tsvetanka Khristova

=== Hammer throw ===
The 1995 event was completed with a non-standard 5 kg implement.

- 1995: Anelia Yordanova
- 1996: Anelia Yordanova
- 1997: Anelia Yordanova
- 1998: Veselina Ivancheva
- 1999: Anelia Yordanova
- 2000: Anelia Yordanova
- 2001: Anelia Yordanova
- 2002: Anelia Kumanova
- 2003: Anelia Kumanova
- 2004: Anelia Kumanova
- 2005: Siyana Kirilova
- 2006: Siyana Kirilova

=== Javelin throw ===
- 1960: Yoanna Arsova
- 1961: Yoanna Arsova
- 1962: Margarita Baltakova
- 1963: Margarita Baltakova
- 1964: Yoanna Arsova
- 1965: Yoanna Arsova
- 1966: Zhuzhana Zhelyazkova
- 1967: Zhuzhana Zhelyazkova
- 1968: Zhuzhana Zhelyazkova
- 1969: Lyutvian Mollova
- 1970: Emilia Mirazchiyska
- 1971: Zhuzhana Zhelyazkova
- 1972: Lyutvian Mollova
- 1973: Lyutvian Mollova
- 1974: Lyutvian Mollova
- 1975: Yordanka Peeva
- 1976: Yordanka Peeva
- 1977: Ivanka Vancheva
- 1978: Tsvetana Ralinska
- 1979: Tsvetana Ralinska
- 1980: Ivanka Vancheva
- 1981: Antoaneta Todorova
- 1982: Antoaneta Todorova
- 1983: Antoaneta Todorova
- 1984: Antoaneta Todorova
- 1985: Maria Dzhaleva
- 1986: Ivanka Vancheva
- 1987: Antoaneta Selenska
- 1988: Antoaneta Selenska
- 1989: Sonia Radicheva
- 1990: Antoaneta Selenska
- 1991: Antoaneta Selenska
- 1992: Antoaneta Selenska
- 1993: Antoaneta Selenska
- 1994: Antoaneta Selenska
- 1995: Sonia Radicheva
- 1996: Sonia Radicheva
- 1997: Khristina Georgieva
- 1998: Khristina Georgieva
- 1999: Khristina Georgieva
- 2000: Rumyana Karapetrova
- 2001: Khristina Georgieva
- 2002: Daniela Todorova
- 2003: Rumyana Karapetrova
- 2004: Khristina Georgieva
- 2005: Rumyana Karapetrova
- 2006: Rumyana Karapetrova

=== Pentathlon ===
- 1960: Snezhana Kerkova
- 1961: Tsvetana Vasileva
- 1962: Sasha Varbanova
- 1963: Donka Naneva
- 1964: Sasha Varbanova
- 1965: Sasha Varbanova
- 1966: Sasha Varbanova
- 1967: Sasha Varbanova
- 1968: Snezhana Yurukova
- 1969: Nedyalka Angelova
- 1970: Nedyalka Angelova
- 1971: Nedyalka Angelova
- 1972: Sasha Varbanova
- 1973: Snezhana Yurukova
- 1974: Snezhana Yurukova
- 1975: Sasha Varbanova
- 1976: Valentina Dimitrova
- 1977: Valentina Dimitrova
- 1978: Mariana Babova
- 1979: Valentina Dimitrova
- 1980: Emilia Pencheva

=== Heptathlon ===
- 1981: Galina Bakhchevanova
- 1982: Valentina Dimitrova
- 1983: Valentina Dimitrova
- 1984: Emilia Pencheva
- 1985: Valya Vasileva
- 1986: Tania Tarkalanova
- 1987: Ivanka Valkova
- 1988: Emilia Dimitrova
- 1989: Svetla Dimitrova
- 1990: Yurka Khristova
- 1991: Yurka Khristova
- 1992: Yurka Khristova
- 1993: Yurka Khristova
- 1994: Yurka Khristova
- 1995: Antonia Yordanova
- 1996: Mladenka Apostolova
- 1997: Evelina Milenova
- 1998: Iveta Ivanova
- 1999: Ilona Mancheva
- 2000: Not held
- 2001: Maria Nikolova
- 2002: Maria Nikolova
- 2003: Maria Nikolova
- 2004: Maria Nikolova
- 2005: Kristina Damyanova
- 2006: Kristina Damyanova

=== 5000 metres walk ===
The 1985 championship was held as a road event.

- 1983: Pepa Bogdanova
- 1984: Pepa Bogdanova
- 1985: Atanaska Dzhivkova
- 1986: Atanaska Dzhivkova
- 1987: Atanaska Dzhivkova
- 1988: Not held
- 1989: Valeria Todorova
- 1990: Not held
- 1991: Not held
- 1992: Nevena Mineva
- 1993: Nevena Mineva
- 1994: Nevena Mineva
- 1995: Nevena Mineva
- 1996: Ginka Radeva
- 1997: Nevena Mineva
- 1998: Nevena Mineva
- 1999: Nevena Mineva-Dimitrova
- 2000: Nevena Mineva-Dimitrova
- 2001: Nevena Mineva-Dimitrova

=== 10,000 metres walk ===
- 1986: Atanaska Dzhivkova
- 1987: Atanaska Dzhivkova
- 1988: Atanaska Dzhivkova
- 1989: Atanaska Dzhivkova
- 1990: Atanaska Dzhivkova

=== 10 kilometres walk ===
- 1991: Atanaska Dzhivkova
- 1992: Nevena Mineva
- 1993: Ginka Radeva
- 1994: Nevena Mineva

=== 20 kilometres walk ===
- 1988: Atanaska Dzhivkova
- 1989: Not held
- 1990: Atanaska Dzhivkova
- 1991: Not held
- 1992: Not held
- 1993: Not held
- 1994: Not held
- 1995: Not held
- 1996: Not held
- 1997: Not held
- 1998: Not held
- 1999: Nevena Mineva-Dimitrova
- 2000: Nevena Mineva-Dimitrova
- 2001: Nevena Mineva-Dimitrova
- 2002: Nevena Mineva-Dimitrova
- 2003: Nevena Mineva-Dimitrova
- 2004: Nevena Mineva-Dimitrova
- 2005: Iliyana Nyagolova
- 2006: Radostina Dimitrova

=== Cross country (long course) ===
- 1965: Kipra Danailova
- 1966: Kipra Danailova
- 1967: Kipra Danailova
- 1968: Kipra Danailova
- 1969: Kipra Danailova
- 1970: ?
- 1971: Anka Doncheva
- 1972: Tonka Petrova
- 1973: Rumyana Chavdarova
- 1974: Rositsa Pekhlivanova
- 1975: Mariana Grigorova
- 1976: Vasilena Amzina
- 1977: Rositsa Pekhlivanova
- 1978: Rumyana Chavdarova
- 1979: Rositsa Pekhlivanova
- 1980: Rumyana Chavdarova
- 1981: Rositsa Pekhlivanova
- 1982: Vania Gospodinova
- 1983: Nedka Keremedchieva
- 1984: Radka Naplatanova
- 1985: Vania Gospodinova
- 1986: ?
- 1987: ?
- 1988: Radka Naplatanova
- 1989: ?
- 1990: ?
- 1991: Galina Goranova
- 1992: Milka Mikhailova
- 1993: ?
- 1994: ?
- 1995: Milka Mikhailova
- 1996: Galina Goranova
- 1997: Olga Zheleva
- 1998: Milka Mikhailova
- 1999: Milka Mikhailova
- 2000: Rumyana Panovska
- 2001: ?
- 2002: Milka Mikhailova
- 2003: Milka Mikhailova
- 2004: Milka Mikhailova
- 2005: Rumyana Panovska

=== Cross country (short course) ===
- 2004: Rumyana Panovska
- 2005: Rumyana Panovska
