= List of Bulgarian records in athletics =

The following are the national records in athletics in Bulgaria maintained by the Bulgarian Athletic Federation (Bulgarian: Българска Федерация Лека Атлетика) (BFLA).

== Outdoor ==
Key to tables: Awaiting ratification Record not kept by BFLA Not ratified or later rescinded by BFLA

=== Men ===
Event	Record	Athlete	Date	Meet	Place	Ref.
100 m	10.13 (+1.4 m/s)	Petar Petrov	24 July 1980	Olympic Games	Moscow, Soviet Union	
200 m	20.20 (+0.8 m/s)	Nikolay Antonov	26 August 1991	World Championships	Tokyo, Japan	
400 m	45.32	Iliya Dzhivondov	3 June 2000		Sofia, Bulgaria	
800 m	1:46.3 h	Binko Kolev	12 July 1979		Celje, Yugoslavia	
1000 m	2:18.22	Miroslav Chochkov	20 August 1988		Stara Zagora, Bulgaria	
1500 m	3:39.53	Evgeni Ignatov	28 August 1982		Sofia, Bulgaria	
Mile	3:58.31	Zhelisko Zhelev	1992		?	
2000 m	4:59.02	Evgeni Ignatov	4 September 1985	Rieti IAAF Grand Prix	Rieti, Italy	
3000 m	7:46.34	Evgeni Ignatov	4 July 1987	Bislett Games	Oslo, Norway	
5000 m	13:13.15	Evgeni Ignatov	31 August 1986	European Championships	Stuttgart, West Germany	
10,000 m	27:56.26	Evgeni Ignatov	2 July 1988	Bislett Games	Oslo, Norway	
10 km (road)	29:27	Evgeni Ignatov	24 September 1989		Birmingham, United Kingdom	
15 km (road)	44:15	Christo Stefanov	September 1995		Piła, Poland	
Half marathon	1:02:33	Petko Stefanov	27 October 2002		Podgorica, Montenegro	
Marathon	2:11:26	Christo Stefanov	19 October 1997		Sofia, Bulgaria	
110 m hurdles	13.33 (+1.5 m/s)	Zhivko Videnov	14 June 2000		Chania, Greece	
400 m hurdles	48.48	Toma Tomov	11 August 1986		Budapest, Hungary	
2000 m steeplechase	5:25.12	Mitko Tsenov	20 May 2015	New Stars Meeting	Sofia, Bulgaria	
3000 m steeplechase	8:20.87	Mitko Tsenov	12 June 2014	Meeting Iberoamericano	Huelva, Spain	
High jump	2.36 m	Georgi Dakov	10 August 1990		Brussels, Belgium	
Pole vault	5.82 m	Spas Bukhalov	2 June 2007	U23 National Championships	Sofia, Bulgaria	
Long jump	8.33 m (±0.0 m/s)	Ivaylo Mladenov	3 June 1995		Seville, Spain	
Long jump	8.36 m (−0.7 m/s)	Bozhidar Sarâboyukov	10 July 2026	Herculis	Fontvieille, Monaco	
Long jump	8.49 m (+1.3 m/s)	Bozhidar Sarâboyukov	14 July 2026	Memorial Yordanka Arizanova	Plovdiv, Bulgaria	
Triple jump	17.92 m (+1.6 m/s)	Khristo Markov	31 August 1987	World Championships	Rome, Italy	
Shot put	21.09 m	Georgi Ivanov	20 July 2013	Ústí nad Labem Grand Prix	Ústí nad Labem, Czech Republic	
Discus throw	67.82 m	Velko Velev	15 August 1978		Riga, Soviet Union	
Hammer throw	82.40 m	Plamen Minev	1 June 1991		Plovdiv, Bulgaria	
Javelin throw	83.40 m	Mark Slavov	20 September 2020	Balkan Championships	Cluj-Napoca, Romania	
Decathlon	8199 pts	Atanas Andonov	20–21 June 1981		Sofia, Bulgaria	
Decathlon	100m / Long jump / Shot put / High jump / 400m / 110m H / Discus / Pole vault / Javelin / 1500m; 11.08 / 7.32 m / 15.90 m / 2.08 m / 49.47 / 14.57 / 50.58 m / 4.40 m / 56.92 m / 4:37.48					
20 km walk (road)	1:20:43	Lyubomir Ivanov	26 June 1988		Sofia, Bulgaria	
50 km walk (road)	4:07:46	Boncho Lapkov	14 April 1985		Békéscsaba, Hungary	
4 × 100 m relay	38.99	Bulgaria; Pavel Pavlov; Vladimir Ivanov; Ivaylo Karanyotov; Petar Petrov	1 August 1980	Olympic Games	Moscow, Soviet Union	
4 × 400 m relay	3:01.61	Bulgaria; Stanislav Georgiev; Tsvetoslav Stankulov; Kiril Raykov; Anton Ivanov	21 August 1993	World Championships	Stuttgart, Germany	

=== Women ===
Event	Record	Athlete	Date	Meet	Place	Ref.
100 y	10.59+ (−0.1 m/s)	Inna Eftimova	31 May 2011	Golden Spike Ostrava	Ostrava, Czech Republic	
100 m	10.77 (+0.7 m/s)	Ivet Lalova	19 June 2004	European Cup	Plovdiv, Bulgaria	
200 m	22.01 (−0.5 m/s)	Anelia Nuneva	16 August 1987		Sofia, Bulgaria	
400 m	49.53	Vania Stambolova	27 August 2006	IAAF Grand Prix	Rieti, Italy	
800 m	1:55.42	Nikolina Shtereva	26 July 1976	Olympic Games	Montreal, Canada	
1000 m	2:33.0 h	Totka Petrova	13 August 1978		Sofia, Bulgaria	
1500 m	3:57.4 h	Totka Petrova	11 August 1979		Athens, Greece	
Mile	4:21.52	Vesela Yatsinka	30 June 1982		Budapest, Hungary	
Mile (road)	4:56.6	Devora Avramova	9 September 2023	Brașov Running Festival	Brașov, Romania	
2000 m	5:35.85	Daniela Yordanova	8 July 2004	Agora Meeting	Sofia, Bulgaria	
3000 m	8:30.59	Daniela Yordanova	6 July 2001	Meeting Areva	Saint Denis, France	
5000 m	14:56.95	Daniela Yordanova	25 September 2000	Olympic Games	Sydney, Australia	
5 km (road)	15:45 Wo	Militsa Mircheva	1 October 2023	World Road Running Championships	Riga, Latvia	
10,000 m	32:30.07	Militsa Mircheva	29 March 2019	Stanford Invitational	Stanford, United States	
10 km (road)	33:38	Militsa Mircheva	17 November 2019	Flanigan's Rockin' Rib Run	Davie, United States	
15 km (road)	52:39	Radka Naplatanova	16 November 1988		Griesheim, Germany	
20 km (road)	1:07:38+	Militsa Mircheva	27 October 2019	Valencia Half Marathon	Valencia, Spain	
Half marathon	1:11:14	Militsa Mircheva	27 October 2019	Valencia Half Marathon	Valencia, Spain	
25 km (road)	1:28:37+	Militsa Mircheva	15 May 2022	Copenhagen Marathon	Copenhagen, Denmark	
30 km (road)	1:46:12+	Militsa Mircheva	15 May 2022	Copenhagen Marathon	Copenhagen, Denmark	
Marathon	2:29:23	Militsa Mircheva	15 May 2022	Copenhagen Marathon	Copenhagen, Denmark	
100 m hurdles	12.21 (+0.7 m/s)	Yordanka Donkova	20 August 1988		Stara Zagora, Bulgaria	
400 m hurdles	53.68	Vanya Stambolova	5 June 2011	Meeting International Mohammed VI d'Athlétisme	Rabat, Morocco	
2000 m steeplechase	6:26.45	Silvia Danekova	18 May 2016	38th New Stars International Meeting	Sofia, Bulgaria	
3000 m steeplechase	9:33.41	Silvia Danekova	1 August 2015	Balkan Championships	Pitești, Romania	
High jump	2.09 m	Stefka Kostadinova	30 August 1987	World Championships	Rome, Italy	
Pole vault	4.45 m	Tanya Koleva	21 June 2003	European Cup	Velenje, Slovenia	
Long jump	7.00 m (+0.6 m/s)	Silvia Khristova-Moneva	3 August 1986		Sofia, Bulgaria	
Triple jump	15.20 m (−0.3 m/s)	Tereza Marinova	24 September 2000	Olympic Games	Sydney, Australia	
Shot put	21.89 m	Ivanka Khristova	4 July 1976		Belmeken, Bulgaria	
Discus throw	73.22 m	Tsvetanka Khristova	19 April 1987		Kazanlak, Bulgaria	
Hammer throw	65.35 m	Anelia Yordanova	10 June 2000		Sofia, Bulgaria	
Javelin throw	63.32 m	Hristina Georgieva	28 June 2000		Athens, Greece	
Heptathlon	6658 pts	Svetla Dimitrova	30–31 May 1992	Hypo-Meeting	Götzis, Austria	
Heptathlon	100m H / High jump / Shot put / 200m / Long jump / Javelin / 800m; 13.41 / 1.75 m / 14.72 m / 23.06w / 6.64 m / 43.84 m / 2:09.60					
10 km walk (road)	46:04	Nevena Mineva-Dimitrova	7 August 2002		Munich, Germany	
20 km walk (road)	1:32:11	Nevena Mineva-Dimitrova	30 June 2001		Nova Zagora, Bulgaria	
4 × 100 m relay	42.29	Bulgaria; Krasimira Pencheva; Anelia Nuneva; Nadezhda Georgieva; Yordanka Donkova	26 June 1988		Sofia, Bulgaria	
4 × 200 m relay	1:32.48	Bulgaria; Popova; G. Penkova; Nuneva; Georgieva	20 June 1981		Bourges, France	
4 × 400 m relay	3:25.81	Bulgaria; Katya Ilieva; Rositsa Stamenova; Galina Penkova; Svobodka Damyanova	24 July 1983		Sofia, Bulgaria	

=== Mixed ===
Event	Record	Athlete	Date	Meet	Place	Ref.
4 × 400 m relay	3:22.58	Bulgaria; Yordan Gyorov; Andrea Savova; Todor Todorov; Deva-Mariya Dragieva	22 June 2023	European Team Championships	Chorzów, Poland	

== Indoor ==
=== Men ===
Event	Record	Athlete	Date	Meet	Place	Ref.
50 m	5.80	Ivaylo Karanyotov	21 February 1981		Sofia, Bulgaria	
60 m	6.58	Petar Petrov	25 February 1978		Sofia, Bulgaria	
60 m	6.53	Hristo Iliev	21 February 2026	Balkan Championships	Belgrade, Serbia	
100 m	10.6 h	Pavel Bidinki	27 February 1965		Sofia, Bulgaria	
200 m	20.41	Nikolay Antonov	1 March 1992	European Championships	Genoa, Italy	
400 m	46.35	Iliya Dzhivondov	12 February 2000		Piraeus, Greece	
800 m	1:47.78	Binko Kolev	25 February 1979		Wien, Austria	
1000 m	2:25.05	Binko Kolev	1 February 1986		Dobrich, Bulgaria	
1000 m	2:25.05	Zdravko Gospodinov	1 February 1986		Dobrich, Bulgaria	
1500 m	3:41.7 h	Evgeni Ignatov	8 February 1981		Sofia, Bulgaria	
3000 m	7:55.4 h	Evgeni Ignatov	1 February 1981		Sofia, Bulgaria	
50 m hurdles	6.62	Plamen Krastev	22 February 1981	European Championships	Grenoble, France	
50 m hurdles	6.62	Zhivko Videnov	25 February 2001	Meeting Pas de Calais	Liévin, France	
60 m hurdles	7.62	Zhivko Videnov	29 January 2000		Sofia, Bulgaria	
High jump	2.31 m	Georgi Dakov	26 February 1991		Budapest, Hungary	
Pole vault	5.76 m	Spas Bukhalov	4 February 2006		Sofia, Bulgaria	
Long jump	8.30 m	Ivaylo Mladenov	28 February 1994		Piraeus, Greece	
Long jump	8.39 m	Bozhidar Sarâboyukov	8 February 2026	Meeting Metz Moselle Athlélor	Metz, France	
Long jump	8.45 m	Bozhidar Sarâboyukov	11 February 2026	Belgrade Indoor Meeting	Belgrade, Serbia	
Triple jump	17.45 m	Khristo Markov	6 February 1988		Piraeus, Greece	
Shot put	21.02 m	Georgi Ivanov	7 March 2014	World Championships	Sopot, Poland	
Heptathlon	5853 pts	Atanas Andonov	11 March 1981		Sofia, Bulgaria	
Heptathlon	60m / Long jump / Shot put / High jump / 60m H / Pole vault / 1000m; 7.21 / 6.84 m / 15.63 m / 2.12 m / 8.17 / 4.60 m / 2:47.1					
5000 m walk	18:58.18	Lyubomir Ivanov	11 February 1990		Sofia, Bulgaria	
4 × 200 m relay	1:27.77	University Team; G. Atanasov; F. Jakubov; Kr. Sokolov; B. Padev	17 February 1985		Sofia, Bulgaria	
4 × 400 m relay	3:15.0 h	Bulgaria; Yanko Bratanov; Marin Danov; Vasil Kasov; Krastyo Khristov	17 February 1974		Sofia, Bulgaria	

=== Women ===
Event	Record	Athlete	Date	Meet	Place	Ref.
50 m	6.12	Anelia Nuneva	27 January 1995		Moscow, Russia	
55 m	6.64	Anelia Nuneva	27 February 1987		New York City, United States	
60 m	7.03	Anelia Nuneva	22 February 1987	Meeting Pas de Calais	Liévin, France	
100 m	12.28	Nadeschda Georgieva	22 December 1982		Sofia, Bulgaria	
200 m	22.91	Ivet Lalova	6 March 2005	European Championships	Madrid, Spain	
200 m	22.87	Ivet Lalova	1 February 2004	Akademik Meeting	Sofia, Bulgaria	
300 m	36.81	Vania Stambolova	14 February 2012	Meeting Pas de Calais	Liévin, France	
400 m	50.21	Vania Stambolova	12 March 2006	World Championships	Moscow, Russia	
800 m	2:00.07	Teodora Kolarova	21 February 2007	Balkan Championships	Piraeus, Greece	
1000 m	2:40.15	Tsvetelina Kirilova	2 February 2003		Sofia, Bulgaria	
1500 m	4:04.19	Daniela Yordanova	9 March 2008	World Championships	Valencia, Spain	
3000 m	8:47.45	Daniela Yordanova	27 February 2000	European Championships	Ghent, Belgium	
5000 m	17:27.44	Petrana Petkova	24 January 2004		Nebraska, United States	
5000 m	17:19.53 OT	Petrana Petkova	3 February 2006	Hoosier Relays	Bloomington, United States	
50 m hurdles	6.77	Yordanka Donkova	7 February 1993		Grenoble, France	
60 m hurdles	7.74	Yordanka Donkova	14 February 1987		Sofia, Bulgaria	
60 m hurdles	7.6 h	Yordanka Donkova	8 February 1987		Sofia, Bulgaria	
High jump	2.06 m	Stefka Kostadinova	20 February 1988		Piraeus, Greece	
Pole vault	4.50 m	Tanya Koleva-Stefanova	16 February 2005	Athens Meeting	Athens, Greece	
Long jump	6.91 m	Magdalena Khristova	19 February 1998	GE Galan	Stockholm, Sweden	
Triple jump	14.94 m	Iva Prandzheva	7 March 1999	World Championships	Maebashi, Japan	
Shot put	20.78 m	Ivanka Khristova	14 February 1976		Sofia, Bulgaria	
Pentathlon	4542 pts	Daniela Nenova	6 March 1983		Yambol, Bulgaria	
Pentathlon	60m H / High jump / Shot put / Long jump / 800m; 8.66 / 1.82 m / 12.74 m / 6.28 m / 2:13.80					
3000 m walk	12:50.28	Nevena Mineva-Dimitrova	27 January 2001		Sofia, Bulgaria	
4 × 200 m relay	1:39.7	Bulgaria; If. Benkova; If Koschintscharka; S. Kasandschieva; M. Bobtjcheva	14 March 1971		Sofia, Bulgaria	
4 × 400 m relay	3:32.03	Bulgaria; Monika Gachevska; Mariyana Dimitrova; Teodora Kolarova; Vanya Stambolova	4 February 2006		Sofia, Bulgaria	
