= Sofia Marathon =

Annual race in Bulgaria held since 1983

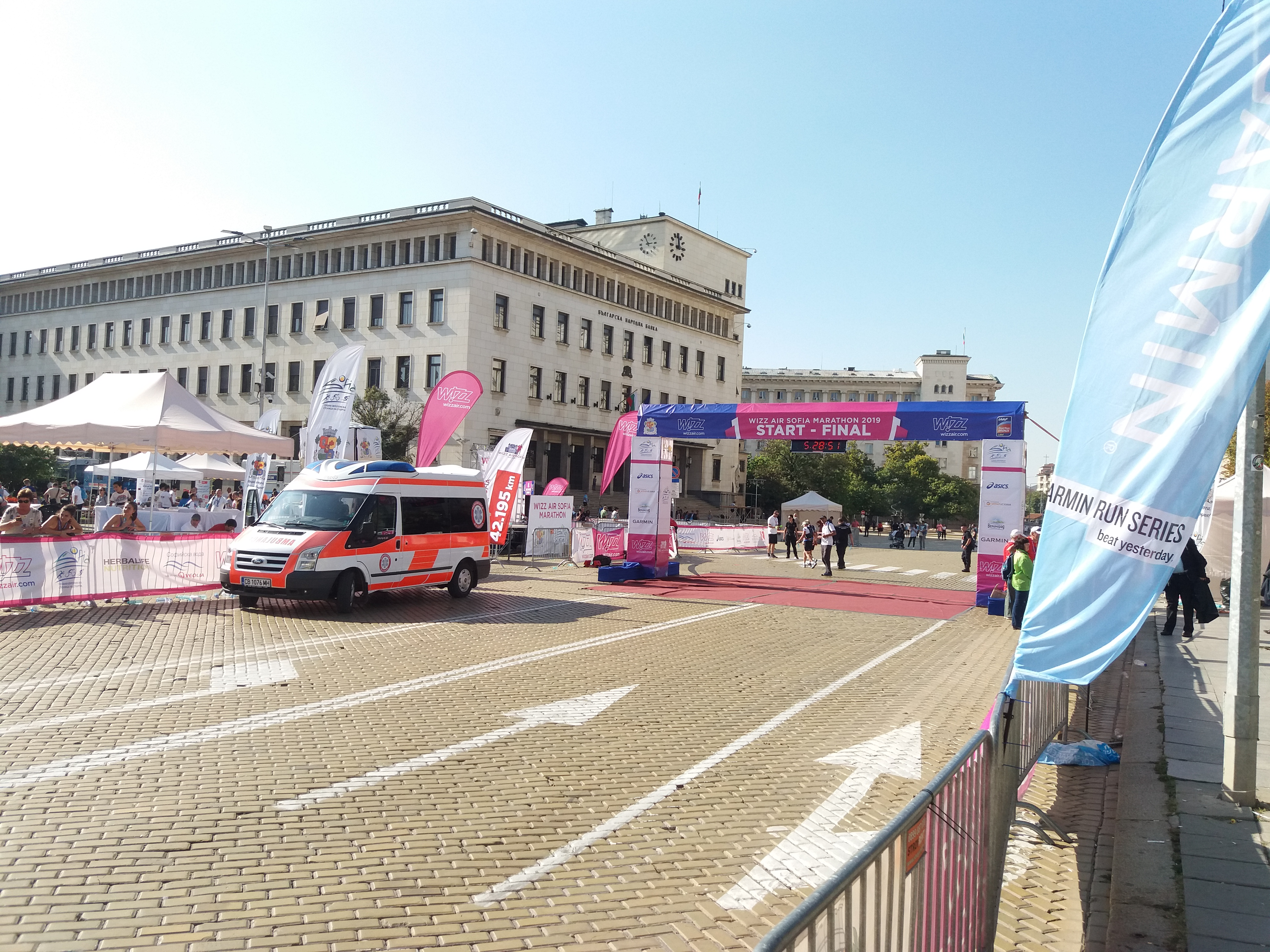
- Start and finish area at Battenberg Square in 2019
- Date: October
- Location: Sofia, Bulgaria
- Event type: Road
- Distance: Marathon, half marathon, 10K
- Primary sponsor: Wizz Air
- Established: 1983 (43 years ago)
- Website: Sofia Marathon
- Participants: 414 finishers (2022); 328 finishers (2021); 386 finishers (2020); 525 finishers (2019) (Note: The official results list 526 finishers, but Hassan Laqouahi, who originally placed fifth, was later disqualified for failing an in-competition drug test.); 390 finishers (2017); 223 finishers (2015)

The Sofia Marathon is an annual road marathon hosted by Sofia, Bulgaria, since 1983. The marathon is categorized as a Bronze Label Road Race by World Athletics. During race weekend, a half marathon, a 10K race, and a fun run of length 3 km (1.9 mi) are also offered.

== History ==
The inaugural marathon was held on 22 May 1983.

The 2020 edition of the marathon, held on 11 October 2020, was notable for having taken place during the coronavirus pandemic, despite marathons in Riga and nearby Bucharest, scheduled for the same weekend, being cancelled the day before they were to occur. (Note: The Riga Marathon, a two-day event, was cancelled on Friday, and the Bucharest Marathon, already stripped down to only the marathon race scheduled for Sunday, and limited to only professional runners, was cancelled on Saturday.) In addition, during the start of the 10K race, Serbian Olympian Olivera Jevtić was deliberately pushed by another runner from Bulgaria, who knocked her down. Jevtić struck her head on the ground, lost consciousness, and suffered a hematoma on her head as a result. Furthermore, both runners that were originally declared winners, Viktoriya Khapilina and Youssef Sbaai, were later disqualified by the Athletics Integrity Unit (AIU) because their in-competition samples had tested positive for erythropoietin.

== Course ==
External images
- Course map of full marathon in 2015
- Course map of full marathon in 2017
- Course map of full marathon in 2019

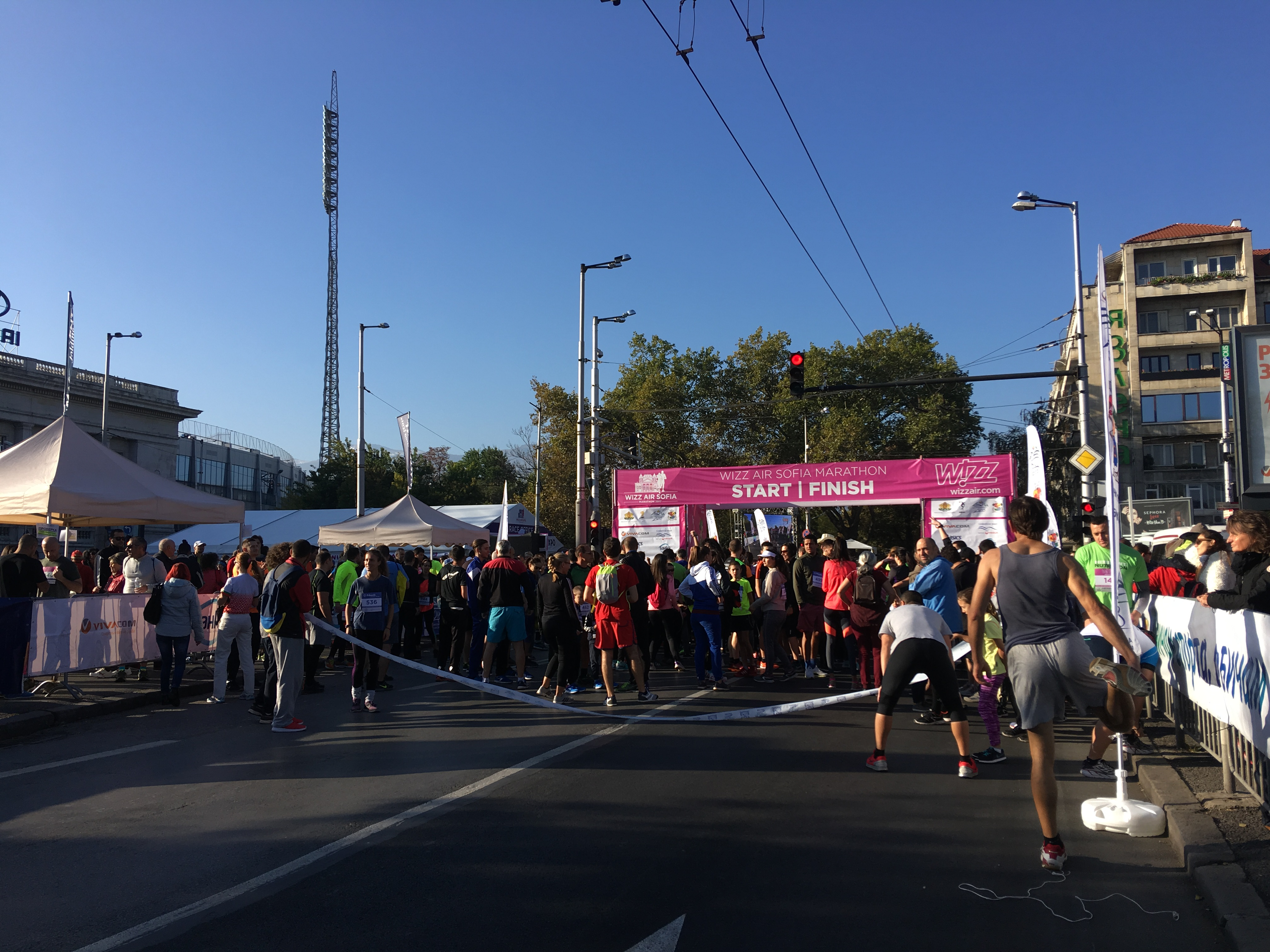
Congregating at the start, which was between Prince's Garden and Vasil Levski National Stadium in 2017

The marathon begins and ends on Battenberg Square, in front of the National Art Gallery. It consists of two loops, which half marathoners run once.

The course first briefly heads west before turning north on Maria Luiza Boulevard. Shortly after passing Lions' Bridge, the marathon hits a turnaround point and heads back south, past St Nedelya Church. After encountering the Court House on Vitosha Boulevard, runners then head east until they hit Georgi Rakovski Street, then take that street northeast to Tsar Osvoboditel Boulevard. Marathoners then head southeast along the boulevard past the National Assembly to turn north onto Vasil Levski Boulevard in front of Sofia University.

The course next has an out-and-back leg of roughly 15 km (9 mi) in length that largely stays on Knyaz Aleksandar Dondukov Boulevard, Vladimir Vazov Boulevard, and Botevgrad Highway, with a turnaround point near the northeastern limits of the city, past the airport. After returning to Vasil Levski Boulevard in the city center, runners then turn west to run past Alexander Nevsky Cathedral before returning to Battenberg Square to complete the half marathon loop.

== Winners ==
Ed.	Date	Male Winner	Time	Female Winner	Time	Rf.
1	1983.05.22	Stanimir Nenov (BUL)	2:24:54	Nedyalka Bakalova (BUL)	3:19:12	
2	1984.05.20	Petko Karpachev (BUL)	2:19:30	Rumyana Chavdarova (BUL)	2:53:45	
3	1985.05.19	Klaus Goldmayer (GDR)	2:24:42	Petranka Nikolova (BUL)	2:56:17	
4	1986.05.18	Stanimir Nenov (BUL)	2:21:17	Birgit Schuckmann (GDR)	2:49:12	
5	1987.05.17	Veselin Vasilev (BUL)	2:24:23	Rosemarie Kössler (GDR)	2:46:55	
6	1988.05.15	Veselin Vasilev (BUL)	2:20:47	Nataliya Balyakina (SUN)	2:49:27	
7	1989.05.14	Klaus Goldammer (GDR)	2:24:29	Rumyana Panovska (BUL)	2:46:29	
8	1990.05.13	Veselin Vasilev (BUL)	2:25:37	Stayka Gandurova (BUL)	2:57:23	
9	1991.05.12	Hristo Georgiev (BUL)	2:22:00	Mariana Maslarova (BUL)	3:21:51	
10	1992.05.03	Rangel Filipov (BUL)	2:21:51	Gergana Voynova (BUL)	2:48:05	
11	1993.05.26	Daniel Dukov (BUL)	2:23:31	Rumyana Panovska (BUL)	2:38:25	
12	1994.05.21	Petko Stefanov (BUL)	2:25:31	Gergana Voynova (BUL)	2:52:38	
13	1995.05.21	Petko Stefanov (BUL)	2:14:54	Gergana Voynova (BUL)	2:41:34	
	—	marathon distance not held from 2009 to 2011 due to financial and infrastructural issues				
29 (Note: The 2012 edition of the race had been considered the 29th Sofia Marathon by the race organizers, while the Association of Road Racing Statisticians (ARRS) considered it to be the 27th running of the marathon.)	2012.10.21	Shaban Mustafa (BUL)	2:28:21	Anita Krasteva (BUL)	2:55:43	
30 (Note: The 2013 edition of the race was acknowledged by the race organizers as the 28th time the traditional marathon was run in Sofia. ARRS also used the latter ordinal for the 2013 race, and considered it the 28th running of the marathon. In contrast, several reliable sources, including Bulgarian National Radio and TV+, reported the 2013 race as the 30th anniversary edition (Bulgarian: "30-ото юбилейно издание") of the Sofia Marathon.)	2013.10.06	Lahcen Mokraji (MAR)	2:22:42	Silvia Danekova (BUL)	2:52:27	
31 (Note: The 2014 edition of the race was acknowledged by the race organizers as both the 31st Sofia Marathon and the 29th time the traditional marathon was run in Sofia. ARRS also used the latter ordinal for the 2014 race, and considered it the 29th running of the marathon.)	2014.10.12	Edwin Kipchumba (KEN)	2:19:06	Zefre Worku (ETH)	2:40:53	
32 (Note: The 2015 edition of the race had been considered the 32nd Sofia Marathon by the race organizers, while ARRS considered it to be the 30th running of the marathon.)	2015.10.04	Samuel Demie (ETH)	2:16:41	Rebecca Korir (KEN)	2:32:35	
33 (Note: The 2016 edition of the race had been considered the 33rd Sofia Marathon by the race organizers, while ARRS considered it to be the 31st running of the marathon.)	2016.10.09	Gudeta Biratu (ETH)	2:15:45	Belaynesh Yigezu (ETH)	2:39:39	
	2017.10.15	Samson Barmao (KEN)	2:14:49	Ruth Matebo (KEN)	2:40:30	
	2018.10.14	Stephen Kipchirchir (KEN)	2:14:06	Ruth Matebo (KEN)	2:35:21	
	2019.10.13	Hosea Tuei (KEN)	2:15:59	Shegae Maeregu (ETH)	2:35:36	
	2020.10.11	Redouan Nouini (MAR) (Note: Youssef Sbaai crossed the finish line first, but was disqualified for failing an in-competition drug test.)	2:13:03	Naom Jebet (KEN) (Note: Viktoriya Khapilina crossed the finish line first, but was disqualified for failing an in-competition drug test.)	2:28:41	
	2021.10.10	Duncan Koech (KEN)	2:15:47	Tubay Erdal (TUR)	2:34:30	
	2022.10.09	Mohamed Chaaboud (MAR)	2:13:38	Hildah Jepkogei Cheboi (KEN)	2:45:52	
