= 1987 World Championships in Athletics – Men's discus throw =

These are the official results of the Men's Discus Throw event at the 1987 World Championships in Rome, Italy. There were a total of 27 participating athletes, with the final held on Friday September 4, 1987.

== Medalists ==
Gold	Jürgen Schult; East Germany (GDR)
Silver	John Powell; United States (USA)
Bronze	Luis Delis; Cuba (CUB)

== Schedule ==
- All times are Central European Time (UTC+1)

Qualification Round
Group A	Group B
03.09.1987 – ??:??h	03.09.1987 – ??:??h
Final Round
04.09.1987 – 18:50h

== Abbreviations ==
- All results shown are in metres

Q	automatic qualification
q	qualification by rank
DNS	did not start
NM	no mark
WR	world record
AR	area record
NR	national record
PB	personal best
SB	season best

== Records ==
Standing records prior to the 1987 World Athletics Championships
World Record	Jürgen Schult (GDR)	74.08 m	January 6, 1986	(East Germany) Neubrandenburg, Neubrandenburg
Event Record	Imrich Bugár (TCH)	67.72 m	August 14, 1983	Helsinki, Finland
Broken records during the 1987 World Athletics Championships
Event Record	Jürgen Schult (GDR)	68.74 m	September 4, 1987	Rome, Italy

== Qualification ==
- Held on Thurdsday 1987-09-03

RANK	GROUP A	DISTANCE
1.	Luis Delis (CUB)	66.06 m
2.	Rolf Danneberg (FRG)	64.90 m
3.	Romas Ubartas (URS)	64.48 m
4.	John Powell (USA)	63.62 m
5.	Imrich Bugár (TCH)	62.68 m
6.	Bradley Cooper (BAH)	61.70 m
7.	Knut Hjeltnes (NOR)	61.64 m
8.	Dariusz Juzyszyn (POL)	61.38 m
9.	Stefan Fernholm (SWE)	61.36 m
10.	Vesteinn Hafsteinsson (ISL)	59.32 m
11.	Georgi Georgiev (BUL)	58.80 m
12.	John Brenner (USA)	58.44 m
13.	Patrick Journoud (FRA)	57.84 m
—	Konstantinos Georgakopoulos (GRE)	NM

RANK	GROUP B	DISTANCE
1.	Jürgen Schult (GDR)	66.04 m
2.	Vaclavas Kidykas (URS)	64.60 m
3.	Volodymyr Zinchenko (URS)	64.30 m
4.	Géjza Valent (TCH)	63.66 m
5.	Alois Hannecker (FRG)	63.34 m
6.	Marco Martino (ITA)	62.26 m
7.	Svein Inge Valvik (NOR)	59.76 m
8.	Lars Sundin (SWE)	59.44 m
9.	Ray Lazdins (CAN)	59.16 m
10.	Randy Heisler (USA)	59.02 m
11.	Kamen Dimitrov (BUL)	58.90 m
—	Göran Svensson (SWE)	NM
—	Werner Hartmann (FRG)	DNS

== Final ==
RANK	FINAL	DISTANCE
	Jürgen Schult (GDR)	68.74 m CR
	John Powell (USA)	66.22 m
	Luis Delis (CUB)	66.02 m
4.	Rolf Danneberg (FRG)	65.96 m
5.	Volodymyr Zinchenko (URS)	65.60 m
6.	Romas Ubartas (URS)	65.50 m
7.	Imrich Bugár (TCH)	65.32 m
8.	Vaclavas Kidykas (URS)	63.64 m
9.	Géjza Valent (TCH)	61.98 m
10.	Bradley Cooper (BAH)	61.94 m
11.	Alois Hannecker (FRG)	60.98 m
12.	Marco Martino (ITA)	60.60 m

== See also ==
- 1984 Men's Olympic Discus Throw (Los Angeles)
- 1986 Men's European Championships Discus Throw (Stuttgart)
- 1988 Men's Olympic Discus Throw (Seoul)
- 1990 Men's European Championships Discus Throw (Split)
