= Georgi Georgiev =

Georgi Georgiev may refer to:

== Entertainment ==
- Georgi Georgiev-Getz (1926–1996), actor
- Georgi Georgiev-Gogo (born 1971), Bulgarian voice actor

== Summer sports ==
- Georgi Georgiev (discus thrower) (born 1961), Bulgarian discus thrower
- Georgi Georgiev (footballer, born 1963), Bulgarian footballer who played in the 1994 FIFA World Cup
- Georgi Georgiev (footballer, born 1988), Bulgarian goalkeeper playing for PFC Levski Sofia
- Georgi Georgiev (footballer, born 1970), Bulgarian footballer
- Georgi Georgiev (footballer, born 1981), Bulgarian footballer
- Georgi Petrov Georgiev (born 1985), Bulgarian cyclist
- Georgi Georgiev (hurdler) (born 1968), Bulgarian hurdler
- Georgi Georgiev (judoka, born 1976), Bulgarian judoka who won a bronze medal in the 2004 Summer Olympics
- Georgi Georgiev (judoka, born 1947), Bulgarian judoka
- Georgi Georgiev (rower) (born 1951), Bulgarian rower
- Georgi Georgiev (tennis), Bulgarian tennis player

== Winter sports ==
- Georgi Georgiev (alpine skier) (born 1987), Bulgarian alpine skier

== Politics ==
- Georgi Georgiev (politician) (born 1986), Bulgarian politician
