= Kumanova =

Kumanova may refer to one of the following

- A Bulgarian surname, the feminine form from "Kumanov"
  - Ahinora Kumanova, a Bulgarian-German singer
  - Aneliya Kumanova, Bulgarian shot putter and hammer thrower
- Albanian name for Kumanovo, a city in the Republic of Macedonia
