= 1975 European Athletics Indoor Championships – Men's shot put =

The men's shot put event at the 1975 European Athletics Indoor Championships was held on 9 March in Katowice.

== Results ==
Rank	Name	Nationality	#1	#2	#3	#4	#5	#6	Result	Notes
1st place, gold medalist(s)	Valcho Stoev	Bulgaria	19.92	x	20.01	x	19.87	20.29	20.29	
2nd place, silver medalist(s)	Geoff Capes	Great Britain							19.98	
3rd place, bronze medalist(s)	Valeriy Voykin	Soviet Union							19.44	
4	Jaroslav Brabec	Czechoslovakia							18.96	
5	Mikhail Kyoshev	Bulgaria							18.82	
6	Aleksandr Baryshnikov	Soviet Union							18.80	
7	Nikolay Khristov	Bulgaria							18.61	
