= Athletics at the 1973 Summer Universiade – Men's shot put =

The men's shot put event at the 1973 Summer Universiade was held at the Central Lenin Stadium in Moscow on 16 August.

== Results ==
| Rank | Athlete | Nationality | #1 | #2 | #3 | #4 | #5 | #6 | Result | Notes |
|---|---|---|---|---|---|---|---|---|---|---|
| 1st place, gold medalist(s) | Valeriy Voykin | Soviet Union | 19.55 | 19.55 | 19.49 | 19.51 | 19.31 | 19.56 | 19.56 | |
| 2nd place, silver medalist(s) | Leszek Gajdziński | Poland | | | | | | | 19.07 | |
| 3rd place, bronze medalist(s) | Aleksandr Baryshnikov | Soviet Union | | | | | | | 19.01 | |
| 4 | Jesse Stuart | United States | | | | | | | 19.01 | |
| 5 | Dana Leduc | United States | | | | | | | 18.43 | |
| 6 | Josef Forst | West Germany | | | | | | | 17.85 | |
| 7 | Nikola Khristov | Bulgaria | | | | | | | 17.55 | |
| 8 | Michal Strýček | Czechoslovakia | | | | | | | 16.95 | |
| 9 | Emad Ali Fayez | Egypt | | | | | | | 15.39 | |
