= Lyubomir Ivanov =

Lyubomir Ivanov may refer to:

- Lyubomir Ivanov (explorer) (born 1952), scientist, non-governmental activist, and Antarctic explorer
- Lyubomir Ivanov (racewalker) (born 1960), Bulgarian race walker
