= Evgeni Yordanov =

Evgeni Yordanov may refer to:

- Evgeni Yordanov (footballer) (born 1978), Bulgarian footballer
- Evgeni Yordanov (high jumper) (born 1940), Bulgarian track and field athlete
