= 1990 European Athletics Championships – Men's discus throw =

Men's discus throw at the European Athletics Championships

These are the official results of the Men's Discus Throw event at the 1990 European Championships in Split, Yugoslavia, held at Stadion Poljud on 31 August and 1 September 1990. There were a total number of 23 participating athletes.

== Medalists ==
Gold	Jürgen Schult; East Germany (GDR)
Silver	Erik de Bruin; Netherlands (NED)
Bronze	Wolfgang Schmidt; West Germany (FRG)

== Qualification ==
Rank	Group A	Distance
1.	Attila Horváth (HUN)	62.90 m
2.	Rolf Danneberg (FRG)	62.86 m
3.	Romas Ubartas (URS)	62.70 m
4.	Imrich Bugár (TCH)	61.68 m
5.	Stefan Fernholm (SWE)	61.52 m
6.	Vésteinn Hafsteinsson (ISL)	60.40 m
7.	Svein-Inge Valvik (NOR)	60.34 m
8.	Lars Riedel (GDR)	59.28 m
9.	Marco Martino (ITA)	59.02 m
10.	Raimo Vento (FIN)	57.32 m
11.	Kamen Dimitrov (BUL)	56.56 m
—	Dragan Mustapić (YUG)	NM

Rank	Group B	Distance
1.	Wolfgang Schmidt (FRG)	64.84 m
2.	Alois Hannecker (FRG)	64.14 m
3.	Erik de Bruin (NED)	63.76 m
4.	Jürgen Schult (GDR)	62.50 m
5.	Géjza Valent (TCH)	61.52 m
6.	Vasiliy Kaptyukh (URS)	61.04 m
7.	Luciano Zerbini (ITA)	59.94 m
8.	Mika Muuka (FIN)	58.40 m
9.	Nikolay Kolev (BUL)	58.02 m
10.	Marcel Tirle (ROM)	56.00 m
11.	Abi Ekoku (GBR)	53.80 m

== Final ==
Rank	Final	Distance
	Jürgen Schult (GDR)	64.58 m
	Erik de Bruin (NED)	64.46 m
	Wolfgang Schmidt (FRG)	64.10 m
4.	Vasiliy Kaptyukh (URS)	63.72 m
5.	Romas Ubartas (URS)	63.70 m
6.	Rolf Danneberg (FRG)	63.08 m
7.	Imrich Bugár (TCH)	62.36 m
8.	Attila Horváth (HUN)	62.08 m
9.	Géjza Valent (TCH)	60.30 m
10.	Alois Hannecker (FRG)	60.04 m
11.	Stefan Fernholm (SWE)	59.18 m
12.	Vésteinn Hafsteinsson (ISL)	57.36 m

== Participation ==
According to an unofficial count, 23 athletes from 15 countries participated in the event.

- Bulgaria (2)
- Czechoslovakia (2)
- East Germany (2)
- Finland (2)
- Hungary (1)
- Iceland (1)
- Italy (2)
- Netherlands (1)
- Norway (1)
- Romania (1)
- Soviet Union (2)
- Sweden (1)
- United Kingdom (1)
- West Germany (3)
- Yugoslavia (1)

== See also ==
- 1988 Men's Olympic Discus Throw (Seoul)
- 1991 Men's World Championships Discus Throw (Tokyo)
- 1992 Men's Olympic Discus Throw (Barcelona)
