= 1976 European Athletics Indoor Championships – Men's shot put =

The men's shot put event at the 1976 European Athletics Indoor Championships was held on 22 February in Munich.

== Results ==
| Rank | Name | Nationality | Result | Notes |
|---|---|---|---|---|
| 1st place, gold medalist(s) | Geoff Capes | Great Britain | 20.64 | |
| 2nd place, silver medalist(s) | Gerd Lochmann | East Germany | 20.29 | |
| 3rd place, bronze medalist(s) | Aleksandr Baryshnikov | Soviet Union | 20.02 | |
| 4 | Anatoliy Yarosh | Soviet Union | 19.38 | |
| 5 | Mikhail Kyoshev | Bulgaria | 19.22 | |
| 6 | Yves Brouzet | France | 19.13 | |
| 7 | Miroslav Janoušek | Czechoslovakia | 18.99 | |
| 8 | Nikolay Khristov | Bulgaria | 18.58 | |
| 9 | Hreinn Halldórsson | Iceland | 18.41 | |
| 10 | Arnjolt Beer | France | 18.35 | |
