= Petar Bogdanov =

Bulgarian high jumper

Petar Bogdanov (Bulgarian: Петър Богданов, born 20 November 1948) is a retired Bulgarian high jumper.

== Career ==
He was born in Pazardzhik. He finished eighteenth at the 1971 European Indoor Championships, twelfth at the 1972 European Indoor Championships, and eleventh at the 1973 European Indoor Championships, He competed at the 1972 Olympic Games without reaching the final.

He became Bulgarian champion in 1969, 1970, 1971, 1972 and 1973. His championship record of 2.12 metres set in 1970 was not improved until 1980 by Atanas Mladenov. He also became Bulgarian indoor champion in 1970, 1971, 1972, 1973, 1975 and 1976. He held the championship record here as well, with 2.16 metres from 1973 to 1981. Bogdanov's personal best jump was 2.17 metres.
