= Alois Hannecker =

German discus thrower

Alois Hannecker (born 10 July 1961) is a retired (West) German discus thrower.

Hannecker represented the sports clubs MTV Ingolstadt and LC Olympiapark München, and became West German champion in 1986 and 1987. His personal best throw was 65.90 metres, achieved in May 1988 in Bensheim.

== Achievements ==
Year	Competition	Venue	Position	Notes
Representing West Germany
1986	European Championships	Stuttgart, West Germany	12th	
1987	World Championships	Rome, Italy	11th	
1988	Olympic Games	Seoul, South Korea	8th	
1990	European Championships	Split, Yugoslavia	10th	
