= Géjza Valent =

Czech discus thrower (1953–2024)

Personal information
- Born: 3 October 1953 Prague, Czechoslovakia
- Died: 6 October 2024 (aged 71)

Medal record

Men's Athletics

Representing Czechoslovakia

World Championships
| Bronze medal – third place | 1983 Helsinki | Discus |

Géjza Valent (3 October 1953 – 6 October 2024) was a Czech discus thrower who represented Czechoslovakia during his active career. He won the bronze medal at the 1983 World Championships. He set a personal best throw of 69.70 metres on 26 August 1984 at a meet in Nitra. He subsequently competed in veterans championships.

== Life ==
Gejza Valent was born on 3 October 1953 in Prague. He died on 6 October 2024, at the age of 71.

His father, Géjza Valent, Sr. (1929–2010), was also a discus thrower and was a medallist at the 1954 World Student Games.

== International competitions ==
| Year | Competition | Venue | Position | Notes |
Representing Czechoslovakia
| 1983 | World Championships | Helsinki, Finland | 3rd | 66.08 m |
| 1986 | European Championships | Stuttgart, West Germany | 5th | 65.00 m |
| 1987 | World Championships | Rome, Italy | 9th | 61.98 m |
| 1988 | Olympic Games | Seoul, South Korea | 6th | 65.80 m |
| 1990 | European Championships | Split, Yugoslavia | 9th | 60.30 m |
