= Yordan Ilinov =

Bulgarian sprinter

Yordan Ilinov (Bulgarian: Йордан Илинов; born 28 May 1985) is a Bulgarian sprinter who specialized in the 200 metres.

He won the 2005 Balkan Games. He competed at the 2005 World Championships and the 2006 European Championships, but on both occasions only reached the semi-final.

His personal best time is 20.65 seconds, achieved in July 2006 in Sofia. This ranks him third among Bulgarian 200 metres sprinters, only behind Nikolay Antonov and Petko Yankov.

He is member of Turkish multisport club Fenerbahçe SK.
