= Spas Dzhurov =

Bulgarian decathlete (1944–2018)

Personal information
- Nationality: Bulgarian
- Born: 28 February 1944 Sofia, Bulgaria
- Died: 12 April 2018 (aged 73)

Sport
- Sport: Athletics
- Event: Decathlon

Spas Dzhurov (Bulgarian: Спас Джуров) (28 February 1944 – 12 April 2018) was a Bulgarian athlete. He competed in the men's decathlon at the 1968 Summer Olympics.
