= Galin Kostadinov =

Bulgarian shot putter (born 1979)

Personal information
- Full name: Galin Kostadinov
- Nationality: Bulgaria
- Born: 24 December 1979 (age 46) Dobrich, Bulgaria
- Height: 1.94 m (6 ft 4 1/2 in)
- Weight: 113 kg (249 lb)

Sport
- Sport: Athletics
- Event: Shot put
- Club: Dobrudzha
- Coached by: Ivan Petrov

Achievements and titles
- Personal best: Shot put: 20.10 (2005)

Galin Kostadinov (Bulgarian: Галин Костадинов; born December 24, 1979, in Dobrich) is a retired Bulgarian shot putter. He represented his nation Bulgaria, as a 35-year-old, in the shot put at the 2004 Summer Olympics, and also trained as a member of the athletics squad for the sport club Dobrudzha in his native Dobrich under his coach and mentor Ivan Petrov. In 2006, Kostadinov threw a personal best of 20.10 metres to seal the twenty-fifth spot in men's shot put at the European Championships in Gothenburg, Sweden.

Kostadinov qualified for the Bulgarian squad in the men's shot put at the 2004 Summer Olympics in Athens. Earlier in the process, he eclipsed a B-standard entry mark of 20.02 metres from the European Cup Series in Plovdiv. Held inside the renowned Ancient Olympia Stadium, Kostadinov launched a satisfying 17.75-metre shot on his first attempt in the prelims. Upon receiving two marks short of his first throw, Kostadinov's effort was not enough to put him further to the final round, as he finished only in thirty-seventh out of 39 registered shot putters in the overall standings.
