= Atanas Atanasov (runner) =

Bulgarian middle-distance runner

Atanas Atanasov (Bulgarian: Атанас Атанасов; born 19 September 1945) is a retired Bulgarian runner who specialized in the 800 metres and 1500 metres.

He won the 1968 and 1969 Balkan Championships. At the 1971 European Indoor Championships he finished fourth in the 4 x 800 metres relay with the Bulgarian team (Atanasov, Petar Kyatovski, Dimcho Deribeev, Petar Khikov). He also competed in the 800 metres without reaching the final round.

In 1972 he set Bulgarian records in the 800 metres with 1:48.6 minutes and 1500 metres with 3:40.6 minutes. He became Bulgarian 800 metres champion in 1971 and 1972. In the 1500 metres he became Bulgarian champion in 1968, 1969, 1971, 1972 and 1975. He also became 5000 metres champion in 1968 and 1975. He became Bulgarian indoor champion in 1971 and 1976 (1500 metres) as well as 1972 (3000 metres).

He is the father of long jumper Nikolay Atanasov.
