= Kamen Dimitrov =

Bulgarian discus thrower

Kamen Dimitrov (Bulgarian: Камен Димитров) (born 18 January 1962) is a retired Bulgarian discus thrower.

He won the 1981 European Junior Championships and won the Balkan Championships in 1984, 1986 and 1988. He competed at the 1986 European Championships, the 1987 World Championships, the 1990 European Championships and the 1991 World Championships without reaching the final.

He became Bulgarian champion in 1985, 1988, 1989 and 1991. His toughest competitors were Georgi Georgiev and Nikolai Kolev. His personal best throw was 65.40 metres, achieved in May 1986 in Plovdiv.
