= Mikhail Kyoshev =

Bulgarian shot putter (born 1951)

Mikhail Kyoshev (born 15 March 1951) is a retired Bulgarian shot putter.

He finished fifth at the 1975 European Indoor Championships and fifth again at the 1976 European Indoor Championships. He became Bulgarian champion in 1971 and 1975, as well as Bulgarian indoor champion in 1975 and 1976. He rivalled mainly with Valcho Stoev and Nikolai Khristov.

His personal best throw was 19.90 metres, achieved in June 1980 in Zagreb.
