= Ivaylo Sharankov =

Bulgarian long-distance runner

Personal information
- Nationality: Bulgarian
- Born: 18 November 1933 Pernik, Bulgaria
- Died: 16 May 2016 (aged 82)

Sport
- Sport: Long-distance running
- Event: Marathon

Ivaylo Sharankov (18 November 1933 – 16 May 2016) was a Bulgarian long-distance runner. He competed in the marathon at the 1968 Summer Olympics.
