= Radka Naplatanova =

Bulgarian long-distance runner

Radka Naplatanova (Bulgarian: Радка Наплатанова, born 11 July 1957) is a retired Bulgarian long-distance runner.

She competed in the 3000 metres at the 1987 World Championships, but did not reach the final. She became Bulgarian 1500 metres champion in 1988 and 1989, 3000 metres champion in 1983, 1984, 1987, 1988, 1989 and 1991, 5000 metres champion in 1997 and 10,000 metres champion in 1987, 1988, 1989 and 1997.

Her personal best time in the 3000 metres was 8.51.98 minutes, achieved at the 1987 World Championships. She had 15.38.08 minutes in the 5000 metres, achieved in June 1988 in Leningrad. Also, she holds the Bulgarian record in 15 kilometres road running.
