= Aleksandr Baryshnikov =

Soviet athlete (1948–2024)

Personal information
- Full name: Aleksandr Georgievich Baryshnikov
- Nationality: Soviet
- Born: 11 November 1948 Khabarovsk, Soviet Union
- Died: 15 September 2024 (aged 75) Saint Petersburg, Russia
- Height: 198 cm (6 ft 6 in)

Sport
- Country: Soviet Union
- Sport: Athletics
- Event: Shot put
Medal record
Men's athletics
Representing the Soviet Union
Olympic Games
Silver medal – second place	1980 Moscow	Shot put
Bronze medal – third place	1976 Montreal	Shot put
European Championships
Silver medal – second place	1978 Prague	Shot put
European Indoor Championships
Bronze medal – third place	1976 Munich	Shot put
Summer Universiade
Bronze medal – third place	1973 Moscow	Shot put

Aleksandr Georgievich Baryshnikov (Russian: Александр Георгиевич Барышников, 11 November 1948 – 15 September 2024) was a Soviet athlete who competed mainly in the shot put. He trained at Dynamo in Leningrad.

== Life and career ==
Baryshnikov competed for the USSR in the 1976 Summer Olympics held in Montreal, Quebec, Canada in the Shot Put where he won the bronze medal. He returned four years later in the 1980 Summer Olympics held in Moscow, Soviet Union where he improved one place to second winning the silver medal.

He was awarded the Order of the Badge of Honor.

Baryshnikov died on 15 September 2024, at the age of 75.

Records
Preceded by (United States) Al Feuerbach	Men's Shot Put World Record Holder; 10 June 1976 – 6 July 1978	Succeeded by (East Germany) Udo Beyer
