= Kolyo Neshev =

Bulgarian javelin thrower

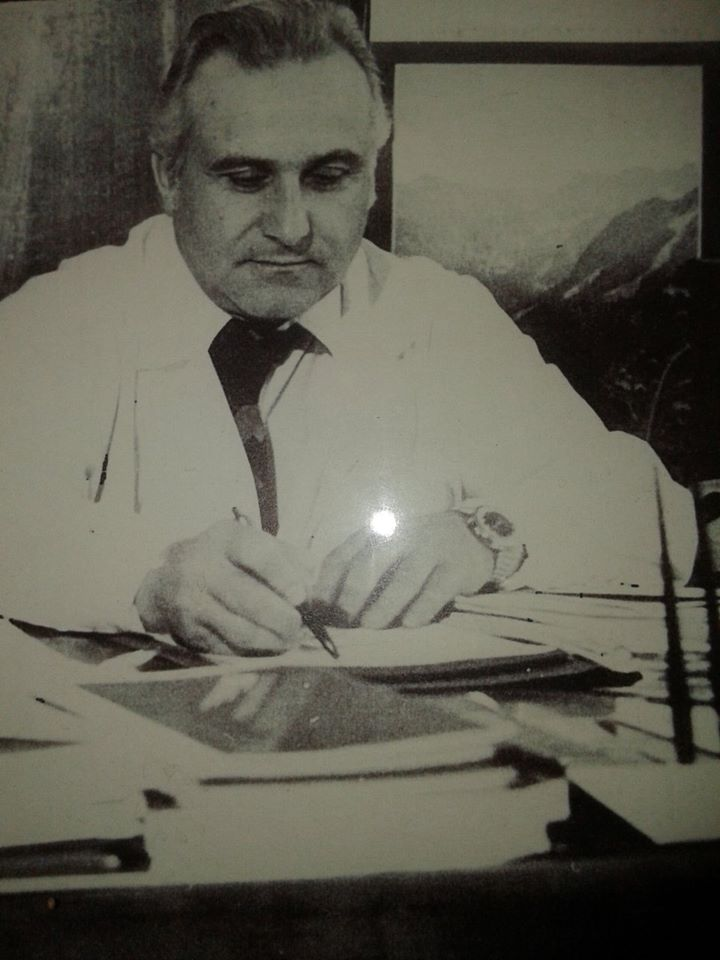

Personal information
- Nationality: Bulgaria
- Born: 30 May 1982 (age 44) Kazanlak, Bulgaria
- Height: 1.88 m (6 ft 2 in)
- Weight: 90 kg (198 lb)

Sport
- Sport: Athletics
- Event: Javelin throw
- Club: Pavel Pavlov Vratsa (BUL)

Kolyo Neshev (Bulgarian: Кольо Нешев; born May 30, 1982, in Kazanlak) is a Bulgarian javelin thrower. He represented Bulgaria at the 2008 Summer Olympics in Beijing, and competed in the men's javelin throw. Neshev threw the javelin, with a possible best mark and distance of 66.00 metres, finishing only in thirty-sixth place.

Neshev is also a sixteenth-time national record holder in the javelin throw, with a highest possible achievement of 63.32 metres, having won a gold medal at the 2012 European Winter Throwing Championships in Sofia.
