= Dimitar Khlebarov =

Bulgarian pole vaulter

Personal information
- Born: 3 September 1934 Yambol, Bulgaria
- Died: 28 October 2009 (aged 75)

Sport
- Sport: Track and field
Medal record
Representing Bulgaria
Summer Universiade
Gold medal – first place	1961 Sofia	Pole vault

Dimitar Panayotov Khlebarov (Bulgarian: Димитър Панайотов Хлебаров; 3 September 1934 – 28 October 2009) was pole vaulter from Bulgaria. He set his personal best (4.96 metres) on 26 September 1965 at a meet in Sofia. He was born in Yambol.

== Achievements ==
Year	Competition	Venue	Position	Notes
1960	Olympic Games	Rome, Italy	11th	4.30
1961	World Student Games	Sofia, Bulgaria	1st	
1964	Olympic Games	Tokyo, Japan	NM	
