= Ekaterina Nedeva =

Bulgarian long jumper (born 1950)

Personal information
- Nationality: Bulgarian
- Born: 10 August 1950 (age 75)

Sport
- Sport: Athletics
- Event: Long jump
Medal record
Representing Bulgaria

Ekaterina Nedeva (Bulgarian: Екатерина Недева; born 10 August 1950) is a Bulgarian athlete. She competed in the women's long jump at the 1976 Summer Olympics and the 1980 Summer Olympics.

== Olympic Participation ==
Year	Position	Meters	Round
1976	15	6.16	Qualifying
1980	9	5.83	Qualifying, Group A
