= Georgi Georgiev (discus thrower) =

Bulgarian discus thrower

Georgi D. Georgiev (Bulgarian: Георги Георгиев, born 16 July 1961) is a retired Bulgarian discus thrower. He competed in the men's discus throw at the 1988 Summer Olympics.

He competed at the 1987 and 1991 World Championships without reaching the final. He became Bulgarian champion in 1985, 1988, 1989 and 1991. His toughest competitors were Velko Velev, Kamen Dimitrov and Nikolai Kolev.

His personal best throw was 66.16 metres, achieved in May 1987 in Sofia.
