= Petar Kyatovski =

Bulgarian middle-distance runner

Personal information
- Born: 18 October 1946 (age 79)

Sport
- Sport: Track and field

Petar Kyatovski (Bulgarian: Петър Кятовски; born 18 October 1946) is a retired Bulgarian middle-distance runner who specialized in the 800 metres.

At the 1971 European Indoor Championships he finished fifth in the 800 metres. With the Bulgarian team (Atanas Atanasov, Kyatovski, Dimcho Deribeev, Petar Khikov) he also finished fourth in the 4 x 800 metres relay. He became Bulgarian champion in 1970, 1973 and 1974, and also in the 1500 metres in 1973. He became Bulgarian indoor champion in 1971, 1973 and 1975.
