= Khristo Stefanov =

Bulgarian long-distance runner

Personal information
- Nationality: Bulgarian
- Born: 21 December 1970 (age 55) Botevgrad

Sport
- Sport: Long-distance running
- Event: Marathon

Khristo Stefanov (born 21 December 1970) is a Bulgarian former long-distance runner. In April 1996 he won the Hannover Marathon in Germany in 2:12.25 and was named on the Bulgarian Olympic team for that event. He then competed in the men's marathon at the 1996 Summer Olympics where he finished 30th in 2:18.29. His personal best time for the marathon distance is 2:11.26 set in Sofia in 1997 which was also a new national record for the event.
