= Yordanka Yankova =

Bulgarian sprinter

Personal information
- Full name: Yordanka Lyubenova Yankova
- Nationality: Bulgarian
- Born: 26 July 1949 (age 77) Vratsa, Bulgaria
- Height: 1.64 m (5 ft 5 in)
- Weight: 60 kg (132 lb)

Sport
- Sport: Sprinting
- Event: 4 × 100 metres relay
- Club: Botev Vratsa

Yordanka Lyubenova Yankova (Bulgarian: Йорданка Любенова Янкова; born 26 July 1949) is a Bulgarian sprinter. She competed in the women's 4 × 100 metres relay at the 1972 Summer Olympics.
