= Nikolay Kolev (discus thrower) =

Bulgarian discus thrower

Nikolay Kolev (Bulgarian: Николай Колев; born November 21, 1968, in Kazanlak) is a retired discus thrower from Bulgaria who competed at the 1992 Summer Olympics.

He won the Balkan Championships in 1990 and finished tenth at the 1991 World Championships. He also competed at the 1990 European Championships and the 1992 Olympic Games without reaching the final.

Kolev became Bulgarian champion in 1990 and 1992. His toughest competitors were Georgi Georgiev and Kamen Dimitrov. His personal best was 64.90 meters, achieved in May 1992 in Stara Zagora.
