= Mariya Dimitrova =

Bulgarian triple jumper

Mariya Dimitrova (born 7 August 1976) is a Bulgarian triple jumper.

She finished seventh at the 2007 European Indoor Championships. She also competed at the World Championships in 2003 and 2007 and the Olympic Games in 2000 and 2004 without reaching the finals.

Her personal best jump is 14.52 metres, achieved in June 2004 in Plovdiv. The Bulgarian record is currently held by Tereza Marinova with 15.20 metres.
