= Antoniya Yordanova =

Bulgarian long jumper

Personal information
- Full name: Antoniya Yordanova
- Nationality: Bulgaria
- Born: 17 August 1976 (age 49) Kyustendil, Bulgaria
- Height: 1.70 m (5 ft 7 in)
- Weight: 52 kg (115 lb)

Sport
- Sport: Athletics
- Event: Long jump
- Club: Lokomotiv Plovdiv
- Coached by: Atanas Atanasov

Achievements and titles
- Personal best: Long jump: 6.78 (2004)

Antoniya Yordanova (Bulgarian: Антония Йорданова; born 17 August 1976, in Kyustendil) is a retired Bulgarian long jumper. She was selected to compete for the Bulgarian Olympic team in the long jump at the 2004 Summer Olympics after recording a personal best of 6.78 metres from the European Cup First League in the capital Sofia. Yordanova also trained as a member of the athletics squad for the sport club Lokomotiv Plovdiv under her coach and three-time Balkan champion Atanas Atanasov.

Yordanova qualified for the Bulgarian squad in the women's long jump at the 2004 Summer Olympics in Athens. Two months before the Games, she jumped 6.78 metres to attain both her personal best and an Olympic A-standard at the European Cup First League in Sofia. During the prelims, Yordanova spanned a striking leap of 6.45 on her first attempt, thirty-three hundredths of a metre shorter than her personal best. With two more attempts receiving lower marks, Yordanova's best result was worthily enough to put her in the twenty-first position against a vast field of thirty-nine long jumpers, nearly missing her a chance to compete for the final round by a tenth of a meter.
