= Raycho Tsonev =

Bulgarian long jumper

Personal information
- Nationality: Bulgarian
- Born: 24 February 1936 (age 90)

Sport
- Sport: Athletics
- Event: Long jump

Raycho Tsonev (born 24 February 1936) is a Bulgarian athlete. He competed in the men's long jump at the 1964 Summer Olympics.
