= Valentin Dzhonev =

Bulgarian javelin thrower

Personal information
- Nationality: Bulgarian
- Born: 20 June 1952 Kyustendil, Bulgaria
- Died: 12 September 2015 (aged 63)

Sport
- Sport: Athletics
- Event: Javelin throw
Medal record
Representing Bulgaria
Summer Universiade
Bronze medal – third place	1977 Sofia	Javelin throw

Valentin Dzhonev (Bulgarian: Валентин Джонев; 20 June 1952 – 12 September 2015) was a Bulgarian athlete. He competed in the men's javelin throw at the 1976 Summer Olympics.
