= Snezhana Yurukova =

Bulgarian hurdler

Personal information
- Nationality: Bulgarian
- Born: 20 October 1944 (age 81) Gulyantsi, Bulgaria

Sport
- Sport: Track and field
- Event: 80 metres hurdles

Snezhana Yurukova (born 20 October 1944) is a Bulgarian hurdler. She competed in the women's 80 metres hurdles at the 1968 Summer Olympics.
