= Rositsa Pekhlivanova =

Bulgarian middle-distance runner

Personal information
- Born: 31 January 1955 (age 71) Sliven, Bulgaria
Medal record
European Indoor Championships
Bronze medal – third place	1975 Katowice	800m
Bronze medal – third place	1976 Munich	1500m
Summer Universiade
Bronze medal – third place	1975 Rome	1500m

Rositsa Pekhlivanova (Bulgarian: Росица Пехливанова, born 31 January 1955) is a retired Bulgarian middle-distance runner who specialized in the 1500 metres.

She was born in Sliven, and represented the clubs Sliven, Levski-Spartak Club and Tundzha Yambol during her career. She won the bronze medal in the 800 metres at the 1975 European Indoor Championships, losing out to the silver medalist by only 0.1 seconds. The next year she won the bronze medal in 1500 metres at the 1976 European Indoor Championships. She was only 0.1 seconds behind the silver medalist Natalia Mărășescu, but beat the fourth placer with a full six seconds. She competed at the 1976 Summer Olympics without reaching the final. In round one, only the top four runners in each of the initial heats progressed, and Pekhlivanova finished sixth in her heat with 4:13.11 minutes.

In winning an 800 metres medal at the 1975 European Indoor Championships, she was a part of a strong tradition of Bulgarian 800 metres runners, who won medals at the European Indoor Championships in 1972, 1973, 1975, 1976, 1977, 1978 and 1979. Other than Pekhlivanova, these medals were taken by Svetla Zlateva (1972), Stefka Yordanova (1973), Nikolina Shtereva (1976, 1979), Lilyana Tomova (1976) and Totka Petrova (1977, 1978).

Pekhlivanova became Bulgarian indoor champion in the 1500 metres in 1974 and in 800 metres in 1975. She also became Bulgarian champion in cross-country running in 1974, 1977, 1979 and 1981.

Her personal best time in the 1500 metres was 4.09.0 minutes, achieved in August 1975 in Nice. She also had 2.35.2 minutes in the 1000 metres, achieved in July 1976 in Sofia.
