= Evgeni Yordanov (high jumper) =

Bulgarian high jumper

Evgeni Yotov Yordanov (Bulgarian: Евгени Йотов Йорданов, born May 5, 1940) is a Bulgarian track and field athlete who competed in the 1964 Summer Olympics.

In 1964 he finished twelfth in the high jump event.
