= Nikola Khristov =

Bulgarian shot putter (born 1952)

Personal information
- Nationality: Bulgarian
- Born: 14 February 1952 Sofia, Bulgaria
- Died: 26 March 2020 (aged 68)

Sport
- Sport: Athletics
- Event: Shot put
Medal record
Representing Bulgaria
Summer Universiade
Silver medal – second place	1977 Sofia	Shot put
Bronze medal – third place	1979 Mexico City	Shot put

Nikola Khristov (14 February 1952 – 26 March 2020) was a Bulgarian shot putter.

He finished tenth at the 1974 European Indoor Championships, seventh at the 1975 European Indoor Championships eighth at the 1976 European Indoor Championships. won the 1976 Balkan Championships, finished twelfth at the 1977 European Indoor Championships won the silver medal at the 1977 Summer Universiade, won the 1978 Balkan Championships, won the bronze medal at the 1979 Summer Universiade, and finished twelfth at the 1982 European Championships. He also competed at the 1974 European Championships and the 1980 Summer Olympics without reaching the final.

He became Bulgarian champion in 1976, 1976, 1978, 1980 and 1981, as well as Bulgarian indoor champion in 1980, 1981 and 1982. He rivalled mainly with Valcho Stoev and Mikhail Kyoshev. He was born in Sofia and represented the clubs Botev Vratsa and Levski Spartak. His personal best throw was 20.40 metres, achieved in August 1981 in Budapest. Indoors he had 20.44 metres, achieved in 1980.
