= Rumyana Chavdarova =

Bulgarian middle-distance runner

Medal record

Women's athletics

Representing Bulgaria

European Indoor Championships
Bronze medal – third place	1977 San Sebastián	1500 metres

Rumyana Chavdarova (Bulgarian: Румяна Чавдарова; born 10 September 1950) is a retired Bulgarian middle-distance runner who specialized in the 1500 metres and 3000 metres.

She finished twelfth in the 3000 metres at the 1974 European Championships. She then finished seventh in the 1500 metres at the 1975 European Indoor Championships, fifth at the 1976 European Indoor Championships, won the bronze medal at the 1977 European Indoor Championships, finished eighth at the 1978 European Indoor Championships and fifth at the 1979 European Indoor Championships.

She became Bulgarian 800 metres champion in 1975, 1500 metres champion in 1974, 1975 and 1978, 3000 metres champion in 1986, 1987, 1988, 1980, and 1982 and 10,000 metres champion in 1983. She became Bulgarian indoor champion in the 1500 metres in 1983, 1985, 1987, 1988, 1989, 1980 and 1982 and in 3000 metres in 1982.

Her personal best time in the 1500 metres was 4:08.7 minutes, achieved in July 1979 in Sofia.
