= Nevena Mineva =

Bulgarian racewalker

Personal information
- Nationality: Bulgarian
- Born: 14 June 1972 (age 54)

Sport
- Sport: Athletics
- Event: Racewalking

Nevena Mineva (born 14 June 1972) is a Bulgarian racewalker. She competed in the women's 20 kilometres walk at the 2004 Summer Olympics.
