= Stefan Fernholm =

Swedish discus thrower

Bengt Stefan Fernholm (July 2, 1959 in Norrköping, Östergötland – March 11, 1997 in Västerås, Västmanland) was a discus thrower and shot putter from Sweden.

Fernholm was an All-American thrower for the BYU Cougars track and field team, finishing runner-up in the discus at the 1984 NCAA Division I Outdoor Track and Field Championships.

Fernholm represented his native country at the 1984 Summer Olympics in Los Angeles, California. There he ended up in 8th place in the Men's Discus Throw competition. He was affiliated with the Bellevue Idrottsklubb in Stockholm during his career.

Fernholm was believed to be the World's Fastest "Big Man." At 6 ft 1 in, 270 lb, Fernholm ran the 40 yard dash in 4.25 seconds, which would put him amongst the fastest players ever to play Professional Football.

Fernholm was a Latter-day Saint.

In 2008 Swedish Television broadcast "Diskuskastarens Dröm", a documentary film by the well known Swedish documentary filmmaker Tom Alandh, focusing on Fernholm's life, sudden death at age 37 and its potential links to use of anabolic steroids and painkillers. It is made clear that Fernholm used steroids throughout his career even though he never tested positive and that he abused pain reducing medicine in the later part of his life.

== Personal bests ==
- Shot Put — 19.99 metres (set on 1981-04-04 in Tempe)
- Discus Throw — 68.30 metres (set on 1987-07-15 in Västerås)
