= Atanas Mladenov =

Bulgarian high jumper

Atanas Mladenov (Bulgarian: Атанас Младенов, born 3 January 1960) is a retired Bulgarian high jumper.

== Career ==
He was born in Plovdiv and represented the club Trakia Plovdiv. He competed at the 1980 Olympic Games without reaching the final. He became Bulgarian champion in 1980 and 1981. His championship record of 2.15 metres set in 1980 was improved already in 1981 by Georgi Gadzhev. He also became Bulgarian indoor champion in 1980 and 1982. He equalled the championship record of 2.16 metres but was surpassed by Valentin Getov in 1981. His personal best jump was 2.20 metres, achieved in 1980.
