= Georgi Georgiev (hurdler) =

Bulgarian hurdler

Georgi P. Georgiev (Bulgarian: Георги П. Георгиев, born 31 May 1968) is a retired Bulgarian hurdler who specialized in the 110 metres hurdles.

He competed at the 1991 World Championships without reaching the final. He became Bulgarian champion in 1990, 1991, 1992, 1993 and 1994. His personal best time was 13.90 seconds, achieved in June 1993 in Brussels.
