= Zhivko Videnov =

Bulgarian hurdler

Zhivko Videnov (Bulgarian: Живко Виденов) (born 23 May 1977) is a Bulgarian hurdler.

He finished eighth at the 2002 European Championships. He also competed at the 2000 Olympic Games, the 2001 World Indoor Championships and the 2001 World Championships without reaching the finals.

His personal best time is 13.33 seconds, achieved in June 2000 in Chania.

His personal 60m hurdles is 7.62 seconds, achieved in February 2000 in Sofia
