= Stanimir Nenov =

Bulgarian middle-distance runner

Personal information
- Nationality: Bulgarian
- Born: 17 November 1955 (age 70) Varna, Bulgaria

Sport
- Sport: Middle-distance running
- Event: Steeplechase

Stanimir Nenov (born 17 November 1955) is a Bulgarian middle-distance runner. He competed in the men's 3000 metres steeplechase at the 1980 Summer Olympics.
