= Petko Yankov =

Bulgarian sprinter

Personal information
- Born: 6 October 1977 (age 49) Plovdiv, Bulgaria

Sport
- Sport: Track and field

Petko Petrov Yankov (Bulgarian: Петко Янков; born 6 October 1977) is a retired Bulgarian sprinter who specialized in the 200 metres.

He competed at the 1999 World Indoor Championships, the 1999 World Championships and the 2000 Olympic Games (both 100 and 200 metres).

His personal best time was 20.27 seconds, achieved in June 1999 in Athens. This ranks him second among Bulgarian 200 metres sprinters, only behind Nikolay Antonov. Furthermore, he had 10.39 in the 100 metres and 46.91 in the 400 metres. At the beginning of the 2000s he left Bulgaria to study in USA and competed for several years for Central Missouri State University until 2005. He currently resides in the USA.
