= Velko Velev =

Bulgarian discus thrower

Personal information
- Nationality: Bulgarian
- Born: 4 January 1948 (age 78)

Sport
- Sport: Athletics
- Event: Discus throw

Velko Velev (Bulgarian: Велко Велев, born 4 January 1948) is a Bulgarian athlete. He competed in the men's discus throw at the 1976 Summer Olympics and the 1980 Summer Olympics.
