= Aneliya Kumanova =

Bulgarian shot putter and hammer thrower

Personal information
- Full name: Aneliya Yordanova- Kumanova
- Nationality: Bulgaria
- Born: 27 April 1972 (age 54) Svishtov, Bulgaria
- Height: 1.76 m (5 ft 9 1/2 in)
- Weight: 74 kg (163 lb)

Sport
- Sport: Athletics
- Events: Shot put, hammer throw
- Club: Levski-Spartak Club
- Coached by: Kharalampi Georgiev

Achievements and titles
- Personal bests: Shot put: 18.38 (2003); Hammer throw: 65.35 (2000)

Aneliya Kumanova (née Yordanova; Bulgarian: Анелия Йорданова-Куманова; born 27 April 1972 in Svishtov) is a retired Bulgarian shot putter and hammer thrower. Representing her nation Bulgaria in two editions of the Olympic Games (2000 and 2004), Kumanova initiated her athletics career as a hammer throw specialist, before turning sights extensively on the shot put event. In 2000, Kumanova demolished a Bulgarian record at 65.35 metres in the hammer throw from the European Cup Series in Sofia, and then attained her own personal best of 18.38 in the shot put at the same tournament three years later. Throughout her athletics career, Kumanova trained for the sport club Levski-Spartak Club in Petrich under her personal coach Kharalampi Georgiev.

Kumanova made her official debut at the 2000 Summer Olympics in Sydney, where she initially competed in the inaugural women's hammer throw. During the qualifying stage, she tossed a hammer at a satisfying distance of 54.92 metres on her second attempt, but finished only in twenty-sixth position from the overall standings.

At the 2004 Summer Olympics in Athens, Kumanova qualified for her second Bulgarian squad, as a 32-year-old veteran, in the women's shot put. Earlier in the process, she attained her personal best and a B-standard entry throw of 18.38 metres from the shot put meet in Sofia. Kumanova launched a rewarding 15.91-metre shot on her second attempt in the morning prelims inside the renowned Ancient Olympia Stadium, but trimmed her chances to compete for the final round, as she placed only in thirtieth overall out of 38 registered shot putters.
