= Petko Stefanov =

Bulgarian long-distance runner

Personal information
- Nationality: Bulgarian
- Born: 19 January 1972 (age 53)

Sport
- Sport: Long-distance running
- Event: Marathon

Petko Stefanov (Bulgarian: Петко Стефанов, born 19 January 1972) is a Bulgarian long-distance runner. He competed in the men's marathon at the 1996 Summer Olympics and the 2000 Summer Olympics.
