= Lyubomir Ivanov (race walker) =

Bulgarian racewalker

Personal information
- Nationality: Bulgarian
- Born: March 9, 1960 (age 66) Sofia, Bulgaria
- Height: 1.88 m (6 ft 2 in)
- Weight: 64 kg (141 lb)

Sport
- Country: Bulgaria
- Sport: Athletics
- Event: Race walk

Achievements and titles
- Personal best: 20 km walk: 1:20:43 (1988)

Lyubomir Ivanov (born 9 March 1960 in Sofia) is a Bulgarian former race walker.

== Biography ==
Lyubomir Ivanov participated at one edition of the Summer Olympics (1988).

== Achievements ==
Year	Competition	Venue	Position	Event	Performance	Notes
1988	Olympic Games	(South Korea) Seoul	43rd	20 km walk	1:28:43	
