= Deaths in August 1989 =

The following is a list of notable deaths in August 1989.

Entries for each day are listed alphabetically by surname. A typical entry lists information in the following sequence:

- Name, age, country of citizenship at birth, subsequent country of citizenship (if applicable), reason for notability, cause of death (if known), and reference.

== August 1989 ==
=== 1 ===
- José Cândido de Carvalho, 74, Brazilian writer.
- Don Heffner, 78, American Major League baseball player (St. Louis Browns).
- Art Herchenratter, 71, Canadian NHL player (Detroit Red Wings).
- John Hirsch, 59, Hungarian-born Canadian theatre director (Royal Manitoba Theatre Centre), AIDS.
- John Ogdon, 52, English pianist and composer, pneumonia.

=== 2 ===
- Luiz Gonzaga, 76, Brazilian singer and songwriter.
- Geraldine Knight Scott, 85, American landscape architect.

=== 3 ===
- Dominic Behan, 60, Irish writer, songwriter and singer ("The Patriot Game"), pancreatic cancer.
- Antonia Brico, 87, Dutch-born American conductor and pianist.
- William Larimer Mellon Jr., 79, American philanthropist and physician, cancer and Parkinson's disease.
- Peggy Montgomery, 84, American silent-screen actress (Arizona Days).
- Egon Orowan, 87, Hungarian-British physicist and metallurgist (crystal dislocation).
- Colston Westbrook, 51, American teacher and linguist, cancer.

=== 4 ===
- S. M. Ahsan, 68, Pakistani Vice Admiral, Commander-in-Chief of the Pakistan Navy (1966-1969), governor of East Pakistan (1969-1971)
- Paolo Baffi, 77, Italian banker and economist, governor of the Bank of Italy.
- Amador Bendayán, 68, Venezuelan actor and entertainer (Sábado Sensacional).
- Maurice Colbourne, 49, English actor (Howards' Way), heart attack.
- Geoffrey Cross, 84, British barrister and judge, Lord of Appeal in Ordinary.
- Wayne LaMaster, 82, American MLB player (Philadelphia Phillies, Brooklyn Dodgers).
- Paul Murry, 77, American cartoonist and comics artist (Disney comics).
- Larry Parnes, 59, British pop manager, meningitis.
- Taghi Riahi, 78, Iranian officer in Iranian Imperial Army.
- W. Wallace Smith, 88, American grandson of Joseph Smith Jr., president of Church of Jesus Christ of Latter Day Saints.
- Wilhelm Stasch, 78, German Olympic boxer (1936).

=== 5 ===
- Toni Breder, 63, German Olympic long jumper (1952).
- John Kinard, 52, American social activist and pastor, director of Anacostia Museum, myelofibrosis.
- John Larsen, 75, Norwegian rifle shooter and Olympic gold medalist (1952, 1956).
- Max Macon, 73, American Major League baseball player (Brooklyn Dodgers).
- Helen Thomas, 22, Welsh peace activist (Greenham Common Women's Peace Camp), struck by police vehicle.
- Stacey Toran, 27, American NFL footballer (Los Angeles Raiders), car accident.

=== 6 ===
- Hubert Beuve-Méry, 87, French journalist and newspaper editor (Le Monde), complications from a fall.
- Beattie Casely-Hayford, 67, Ghanaian founder of the National Dance Ensemble, director of Ghana Broadcasting Corporation.
- Don Clark, 65, American footballer and coach (San Francisco 49ers), heart attack.
- Nat Levine, 90, American film producer (Mascot Pictures).
- P.R. Olgiati, 87, American politician, mayor of Chattanooga.
- William Scott, 86, English cricketer.
- Frank Sinkovitz, 66, American NFL footballer (Pittsburgh Steelers) and umpire.
- Doc Zeigler, 93, American Negro Leagues baseball player.

=== 7 ===
- Leopoldo Sánchez Celis, 73, Mexican politician, governor of Sinaloa.
- Gerhard de Kock, 63, South African Reserve Bank governor, colon cancer.
- Robert Jani, 55, American event producer, Lou Gehrig's disease.
- Mickey Leland, 44, American politician, anti-poverty activist, member of the U.S. House of Representatives (1979-1989), plane crash.
- Al Savill, 72, British-American banker and sports executive (Pittsburgh Penguins).
- Robert Stevens, 68, American television and movie director (Suspense), heart attack after beating.
- Maria Thomas, 48, American writer, plane crash.
- Mira Trailović, 65, Serbian dramaturg and theatre director, co-founder of Atelje 212, cancer.

=== 8 ===
- André Cochinal, 84, French Olympic diver (1924).
- Irving Cottler, 71, American percussionist, heart attack.
- Bob Harris, 74, American MLB player (Detroit Tigers, St. Louis Browns, Philadelphia Athletics).
- Robert Kaske, 68, American professor of medieval literature, brain tumour.
- Enrico Lorenzetti, 78, Italian Grand Prix motorcycle road racer, 250 cc World Championship winner.
- Brian Naylor, 66, British racing driver, boating accident.
- Bobby Oxspring, 70, British Royal Air Force officer and flying ace during World War II.
- George Papp, 73, American comics artist (Superboy).
- Mary Peppin, 76, half of a British twin-sister piano duo act, piano teacher at Guildhall School of Music.
- Audrey Russell, 83, British BBC Radio journalist and war reporter, Alzheimer's disease.
- Maja Sacher, 93, Swiss art collector and philanthropist.
- Morris Shenker, 82, American lawyer, known for connection to Jimmy Hoffa, pneumonia.
- Johnny Vardian, 67, American AAFC player (Miami Seahawks, Baltimore Colts).
- László Willinger, 80, German-born American photographer, heart failure.
- Franz Worisch, 63, Austrian Olympic diver (1948, 1952).

=== 9 ===
- Richard Alexander, 86, American film actor.
- K. Gunaratnam, 72, Sri Lankan film producer, murdered.
- Don Nelson Laramore, 82, American judge.
- Duncan MacPherson, 23, Canadian ice hockey player, body found in melting glacier.
- Kathleen Maguire, 63, American actress (The Time of the Cuckoo, A Flame in the Wind), esophageal cancer.
- Albert Perikel, 76, Belgian cyclist.
- Philip Sidney Whitcombe, 95, English cricketer and British army officer.

=== 10 ===
- Tom Hughes, 82, American MLB player (Detroit Tigers).
- H. Montgomery Hyde, 81, Irish barrister, politician and author, Member of Parliament.
- George Ignatieff, 75, Russian-born Canadian diplomat, ambassador to the United Nations.
- Pierre Matisse, 89, French-born American art dealer.

=== 11 ===
- Ghaus Bakhsh Bizenjo, 69–72, Pakistani politician, Governor of Balochistan.
- Bill Cody Jr., 64, American child actor, suicide.
- Goldup Davies, 75, British Olympic swimmer (1948).
- Léo Kemner Laflamme, 95, American-born Canadian politician, member of the House of Commons of Canada (1925-1930, 1940-1945).
- Robert W. Levering, 74, American lawyer and politician, member of the U.S. House of Representatives (1959-1961).
- John Meillon, 55, Australian actor (Crocodile Dundee, The Fourth Wish), cirrhosis.
- Sonny Thompson, 72, American R&B bandleader and pianist ("Late Freight").
- Richard Ward, 71, British army general, Commander British Forces in Hong Kong.
- Hans Zeier, 90, Swiss Olympic cross-country skier (1928).

=== 12 ===
- Mo Anthoine, 50, British mountaineer, brain tumour.
- Wilfred Burne, 86, British Olympic diver (1928).
- Emyr Estyn Evans, 84, Welsh geographer and archaeologist.
- Henri Goetz, 79, American-born French painter, member of the French Resistance.
- Samuel Okwaraji, 25, Nigerian international footballer (Nigeria), heart failure.
- Max Scott, 82, Australian rules footballer.
- William Shockley, 79, American physicist, Nobel laureate in Physics (Shockley diode), eugenicist, prostate cancer.
- Olga Villi, 67, Italian model and actress (The Birds, the Bees and the Italians).

=== 13 ===
- Anton Cadar, 48, Romanian Olympic gymnast (1964).
- Willy De Bruyn, 75, Belgian trans-gender cyclist.
- Hugo del Carril, 76, Argentinian actor, director and tango singer (Las Aguas Bajan Turbias).
- Tim Richmond, 34, American race car driver, AIDS.
- Larkin I. Smith, 45, American politician, member of the U.S. House of Representatives (1989), plane crash.

=== 14 ===
- Robert Bernard Anderson, 79, American politician, secretary of the Navy and Treasury, throat cancer.
- Bergen (Belgin Sarılmışer), 31, Turkish singer, shot.
- Ricky Berry, 24, American NBA basketballer (Sacramento Kings), suicide.
- Roldano Lupi, 80, Italian film actor.
- Dove-Myer Robinson, 88, New Zealand Mayor of Auckland City.
- Ossie Wiberg, 84, American NFL player (New York Giants, Brooklyn Dodgers).

=== 15 ===
- Sir William Atkins, 87, English founder of Atkins engineering consultancy.
- Wolfram Eberhard, 80, German-born Turkish and American professor of sociology.
- Minoru Genda, 84, Japanese navy general noted for planning attack on Pearl Harbor, and politician.
- Elvy Kalep, 90, Estonian aviator, country's first female pilot.
- Mitsuneyama Keiji, 67, Japanese sumo wrestler.
- Heinrich Krone, 93, German politician, member of the Bundestag.
- Dorothea Leighton, 80, American social psychiatrist.
- Jussi Nordqvist, 72, Finnish Olympic sports shooter (1960).
- Anton Richter, 77, Austrian Olympic weightlifter (1936, 1948).
- Earl B. Ruth, 73, American politician, member of the U.S. House of Representatives (1969-1975), governor of American Samoa.
- Thrasyvoulos Tsakalotos, 92, Greek army general, chief of the Hellenic Army General Staff, ambassador to Yugoslavia.

=== 16 ===
- Jean-Hilaire Aubame, 76, Gabonese politician, Foreign Minister of Gabon.
- Amanda Blake, 60, American actress (Gunsmoke), AIDS.
- Donald Friend, 74, Australian artist and diarist, pederast.
- Milt Halliday, 82, Canadian NHL player (Ottawa Senators).
- Anton Nilson, 101, Swedish terrorist and convicted murderer.
- Erasmo Vera, 66, Chilean footballer.

=== 17 ===
- Richard Bryant, 85, Australian cricketer.
- Jack Chrisman, 61, American drag racer.
- Harry Corbett, 71, English magician, puppeteer and television presenter (Sooty).
- Stavro Skëndi, 83–84, Albanian-American linguist and historian, Parkinson's disease.
- Fred Frankhouse, 85, American Major League baseball player (Boston Braves).
- Lawrence Stevens, 76, South African boxer and Olympic gold medalist (1932).

=== 18 ===
- Robert Buckner, 83, American screenwriter and short story writer (Dodge City, Yankee Doodle Dandy).
- Luis Carlos Galan, 45, Colombian politician, assassinated.
- Claude Kietzman, 71, South African Olympic rower (1948).
- Yūji Koseki, 80, Japanese song and film score composer ("Roei no Uta", "The Bells of Nagasaki").
- Imre Németh, 71, Hungarian hammer thrower and Olympic gold medalist (1948, 1952).
- Bert Oosterbosch, 32, Dutch racing cyclist, cardiac arrest.
- Waldemar Franklin Quintero, 48, Colombian police officer, commander of National Police, assassinated.
- Chrissie White, 94, British silent-screen actress (The Amazing Quest of Mr. Ernest Bliss), heart attack.

=== 19 ===
- Ernst van den Berg, 73, Dutch Olympic field hockey player (1936).
- Ivan Lindgren, 83, Swedish Olympic cross-country skier (1936).
- Alfredo Montelibano Sr., 83, Filipino politician, Secretary of National Defense, governor of Negros and Siquijor Islands.
- Wayne Moore, 44, American NFL footballer (Miami Dolphins), heart attack.
- Joseph A. Pechman, 71, American economist and taxation scholar, president of the American Economic Association, heart attack.

=== 20 ===
- George Adamson, 83, British wildlife conservationist and author in Kenya (Elsa the lioness), murdered.
- Clarence Glacken, 80, American professor of Geography.
- H. B. Halicki, 48, American director, stunt driver and actor (Gone in 60 Seconds), accident while filming.
- Tom Hayward, 76, Australian rugby league footballer.
- Joseph LaShelle, 89, American cinematographer (Laura).
- Tenryū Saburō, 85, Japanese sumo wrestler (Shunjuen Incident).
- Chuck Tollefson, 72, American NFL player (Green Bay Packers).
- Syd van der Vyver, 69, South African racing driver.

=== 21 ===
- William F. Bolger, 66, American Postmaster General, president of the Air Transport Association of America.
- William Danielsen, 73, Norwegian footballer.
- Scott Fenton, 24, Australian NBL basketballer (Sydney Supersonics, Perth Wildcats), car crash.
- Heikki H. Herlin, 88, Finnish engineer, manager of Kone elevators.
- Otto Schulz-Kampfhenkel, 78, German geographer, explorer and writer.
- Raul Seixas, 44, Brazilian rock singer, songwriter and producer, cardiac arrest.
- Phyllis Terrell, 91, American suffragist and civil rights activist.
- Ted Wilks, 73, American Major League baseball player (St. Louis Cardinals).

=== 22 ===
- Stefan Ciapała, 66, Polish Olympic bobsledder (1956).
- Robert Grondelaers, 56, Belgian Olympic cyclist (1952).
- Charles Hill, Baron Hill of Luton, 85, British physician and politician.
- Lillebil Ibsen, 90, Norwegian dancer and actress (Mannequin in Red).
- Sunbeam Mitchell, 82, American businessman, hotel and nightclub owner, heart attack.
- Huey P. Newton, 47, American political activist, founder of the Black Panther party, probable murderer, murdered.
- Krishnarao Shankar Pandit, 96, Indian musician.
- Gerhard Reinhardt, 73, East German politician and German Resistance fighter.
- Vlasta Vraz, 89, Czech-American relief worker, editor and fundraiser.
- Diana Vreeland, 85, American fashion columnist and editor, editor in chief at Vogue, heart attack.

=== 23 ===
- Mohammed Abdul-Hayy, 45, Sudanese poet.
- P. O. Ackley, 86, American gunsmith.
- Erik Almgren, 81, Swedish Olympic footballer (1936).
- Al Cass, 65, American musician and musical inventor.
- Walter de Sousa, 68, Ugandan-born Indian hockey player and Olympic gold medalist (1948).
- Katharina Jacob, 82, German member of the anti-Nazi German Resistance movement.
- R. D. Laing, 61, Scottish psychiatrist (psychosis, schizophrenia), heart attack.
- Nebojša Mitrić, 58, Yugoslavian sculptor and painter, suicide.

=== 24 ===
- Jacques Godechot, 82, French historian of the French Revolution.
- Dan Hill, 72, American college football player (Duke Blue Devils).
- Marjorie Pratt, 89, British aristocrat.
- Feliks Topolski, 82, Polish-born British expressionist painter and draughtsman, official war artist.

=== 25 ===
- Gunnar Berg, 80, Swiss-born Danish composer.
- Jim Brideweser, 62, American Major League baseball player (New York Yankees, Chicago White Sox).
- Jacques Castelot, 75, French film actor.
- Al Cherney, 56, Canadian fiddler, lung cancer.
- Yan Frenkel, 68, Ukrainian composer and performer.
- Frank Henry, 79, American army officer and Olympic equestrian (1948).
- Herbert Loper, 92, American army officer.
- Jerry Masslo, 29, South African refugee.
- Sarjoo Pandey, 69, Indian politician, member of Lok Sabha.
- Roman Palester, 81, Polish composer of classical music.
- Jean-Louis Verdier, 54, French mathematician (Verdier duality), car accident.
- Bronwen Wallace, 44, Canadian poet and short story writer, cancer.
- A. J. Witono, 64, Indonesian military officer and diplomat, ambassador to Japan.

=== 26 ===
- Hans Børli, 70, Norwegian poet and writer.
- Juanita Brooks, 91, American historian and author, Alzheimer's disease.
- Patrick Connor, 83, Irish politician.
- Jorge Franco, 65, Portuguese Olympic fencer (1952).
- Raffaello Gambino, 61, Italian Olympic water polo player (1952).
- Nick Nuccio, 87, American politician, mayor of Tampa, Florida.
- Irving Stone, 86, American writer (Lust for Life, The Agony and the Ecstasy), heart failure.

=== 27 ===
- Brendan A. Burns, 94, American army officer.
- Hal Kelleher, 75, American MLB player (Philadelphia Phillies).
- Gloria Milland, 48, Italian actress.
- Eckart Muthesius, 85, German architect and interior designer (Manik Bagh palace).
- Ramnandan Mishra, 83–84, Indian independence fighter.
- Burhan Shahidi, 94, Russian-born Chinese politician, governor of Xinjiang.
- Bill Shirley, 68, American tenor, actor and producer (Sleeping Beauty, My Fair Lady), lung cancer.

=== 28 ===
- Joseph Alsop, 78, American journalist and newspaper columnist, CIA operative, lung cancer.
- Håkon Askerød, 79, Norwegian footballer.
- Milan Ljubenović, 57, Yugoslavian footballer.
- Robert Macintosh, 91, New Zealand–born British anaesthetist.
- Alex Moore, 71, Australian rules footballer.
- Ondine, 52, American actor, AIDS.
- Charles Sheaffer, 84, American Olympic field hockey player (1932, 1936).
- John Steptoe, 38, American author and illustrator for children's books (Mufaro's Beautiful Daughters), AIDS.
- Fred Waters, 62, American MLB player (Pittsburgh Pirates).
- Gerald Joseph Weber, 75, American district judge (United States District Court for the Western District of Pennsylvania).
- Karl-Heinz Wegmann, 55, German Olympic shot putter (1956).

=== 29 ===
- Buddy Dear, 83, American MLB player (Washington Senators).
- Giorgio di Sant' Angelo, 66, Argentinian-born American fashion designer, lung cancer.
- Pua Kealoha, 86, Hawaiian-born American swimmer and Olympic gold medalist (1920).
- Lorenzo Natali, 66, Italian politician, Minister of Public Works.
- Sir Peter Scott, 79, British ornithologist, conservationist and Olympic medalist in sailing (1936), heart attack.

=== 30 ===
- Max Ballantyne, 45, Australian rules footballer.
- Buddy Burbage, 82, American Negro Leagues baseball player.
- Joe Collins, 66, American Major League baseball player (New York Yankees).
- Joe de Santis, 80, American actor and sculptor (A Cold Wind in August), pulmonary disease.
- Seymour Krim, 67, American author, suicide.
- Dinkar Mehta, 81, Indian politician and trade unionist, leader of the Communist Party of India, mayor of Ahmedabad.
- Dink Roberts, 94, American banjo player.
- Dorothy Schiff, 86, American businesswoman, owner and publisher of the New York Post.
- Ekkehard Tertsch, 83, Spanish-Austrian journalist and Nazi diplomat.

=== 31 ===
- Maribel Arrieta, 55, Salvadoran television host and model, Miss El Salvador, cancer.
- Michele Cascella, 96, Italian artist.
- Moe Dalitz, 89, American gangster, businessman and casino owner, heart and kidney failure.
- Mickey Hawks, 49, American singer and pianist ("Bip Bop Boom").
- Gordon Lethborg, 81, Australian cricketer.
- Vladimir Littauer, 97, Russian and American horseback riding master and author.
- Lou Louden, 70, American Negro Leagues baseball player.
- Claire Luce, 85, American actress, dancer and singer (Up the River, Under Secret Orders).
- Skeeter Newsome, 78, American Major League baseball player (Philadelphia Athletics, Boston Red Sox).
- Don Rainsford, 51, Australian rules footballer.
- Gerhard Scholz, 85, German professor and writer (Philology, German studies).
- Heen Banda Udurawana, 88, Sri Lankan politician, member of the Senate of Ceylon.
- Ruth Wood, 73, British racehorse owner, Epsom Derby winner.

=== Unknown date ===
- Bill Ainslie, 55, South African artist.
- Louis Dolivet, 81, Austro-Hungarian–born French film producer and alleged Soviet spy, editor of Free World.
