= Athletics at the 1960 Summer Olympics – Men's shot put =

Men's shot put at the Games of the XVII Olympiad
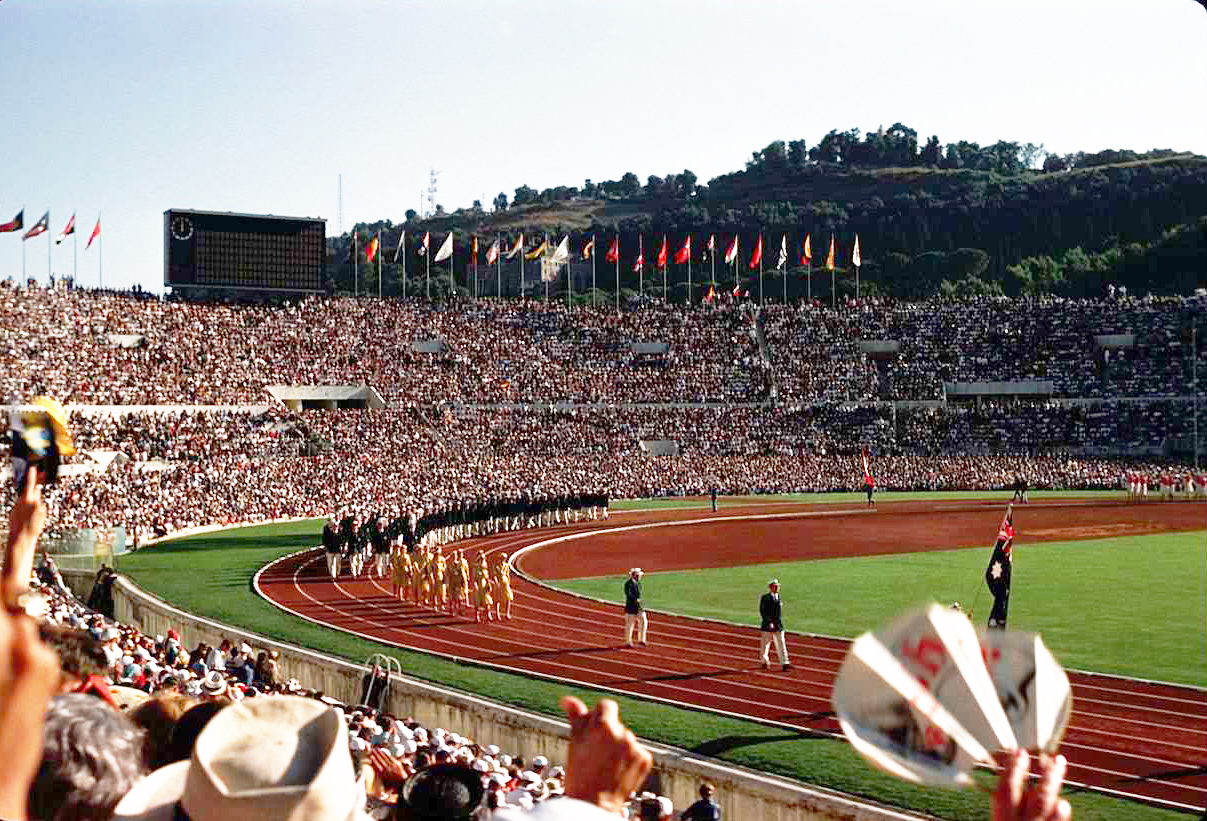
- Olympic Stadium (opening day)
- Venue: Olympic Stadium
- Date: August 31, 1960
- Competitors: 24 from 16 nations
- Winning distance: 19.68 OR

Medalists
1st place, gold medalist(s)		Bill Nieder; United States
2nd place, silver medalist(s)		Parry O'Brien; United States
3rd place, bronze medalist(s)		Dallas Long; United States

The men's shot put throwing event at the 1960 Olympic Games took place on August 31. Twenty-four athletes from 16 nations competed. The maximum number of athletes per nation had been set at 3 since the 1930 Olympic Congress. The event was won by Bill Nieder of the United States, the nation's fourth consecutive and 12th overall victory in the men's shot put. Parry O'Brien and Dallas Long took silver and bronze, giving the American team its sixth medal sweep in the event. O'Brien, who had won gold in 1952 and 1956, matched Ralph Rose (gold in 1904 and 1908, silver in 1912) in coming just shy of a third gold medal. The two remain, through the 2016 Games, the only men to win three shot put medals. Nieder was the fifth man to win two medals (after Robert Garrett, Rose, Jim Fuchs, and O'Brien).

== Background ==
This was the 14th appearance of the event, which is one of 12 athletics events to have been held at every Summer Olympics. Returning finalists from the 1956 Games were all three medalists (two-time champion Parry O'Brien of the United States, fellow American silver medalist Bill Nieder, and bronze medalist Jiří Skobla of Czechoslovakia), as well as sixth-place finisher Erik Uddebom of Sweden, eighth-place finisher Georgios Tsakanikas of Greece, and tenth-place finisher Silvano Meconi of Italy. All three Americans who came to Rome—O'Brien, Nieder, and Dallas Long—had held the world record at some point since the previous Games, with Nieder the first to break 20 metres earlier in August 1960.

Iraq, Israel, Lebanon, and New Zealand each made their debut in the men's shot put. The United States appeared for the 14th time, the only nation to have competed in all Olympic shot put competitions to date.

== Competition format ==
The competition used the two-round format introduced in 1936, with the qualifying round completely separate from the divided final. In qualifying, each athlete received three attempts; those recording a mark of at least 16.75 metres advanced to the final (a large increase from the 15.00 metres in 1956, which had not eliminated any putters). If fewer than 12 athletes achieved that distance, the top 12 would advance. The results of the qualifying round were then ignored. Finalists received three throws each, with the top six competitors receiving an additional three attempts. The best distance among those six throws counted.

== Records ==
These were the standing world and Olympic records (in metres) prior to the 1960 Summer Olympics.

World record	Bill Nieder (USA)	20.06	Walnut, United States	12 August 1960
Olympic record	Parry O'Brien (USA)	17.92	Melbourne, Australia	28 November 1956

Bill Nieder broke the Olympic record first, putting the shot 18.67 metres in his first throw of the final. Parry O'Brien quickly bettered that by 10 centimetres in his own first throw. Dallas Long, beat them both with 18.88 metres in his next throw, his second. Nieder's second throw equalled O'Brien's first, no longer a record; O'Brien's second put the Olympic record over 19 metres for the first time at 19.11 metres. None of the men could better that on their third or fourth throws, but Nieder's fifth went 19.68 metres to win the gold medal and finish with the new record. Long exceeded 19 metres as well in his sixth throw, but barely—19.01 metres.

== Schedule ==
All times are Central European Time (UTC+1)

Date	Time	Round
Wednesday, 31 August 1960	9:00; 16:50	Qualifying; Final

== Results ==
All throwers reaching 16.75 metres advanced to the finals. All distances are listen in metres.

=== Qualifying ===
Rank	Athlete	Nation	1	2	3	Distance	Notes
1	Dallas Long	United States	17.65	—	—	17.65	Q
1	Viktor Lipsnis	Soviet Union	17.65	—	—	17.65	Q
3	Jiří Skobla	Czechoslovakia	17.32	—	—	17.32	Q
4	Parry O'Brien	United States	17.29	—	—	17.29	Q
5	Mike Lindsay	Great Britain	17.28	—	—	17.28	Q
6	Martyn Lucking	Great Britain	17.20	—	—	17.20	Q
7	Bill Nieder	United States	17.14	—	—	17.14	Q
8	Dieter Urbach	United Team of Germany	16.55	17.09	—	17.09	Q
9	Silvano Meconi	Italy	17.08	—	—	17.08	Q
10	Alfred Sosgórnik	Poland	17.06	—	—	17.06	Q
11	Les Mills	New Zealand	X	16.93	—	16.93	Q
12	Hermann Lingnau	United Team of Germany	16.21	16.87	—	16.87	Q
13	Zsigmond Nagy	Hungary	16.84	—	—	16.84	Q
14T	Jaroslav Plíhal	Czechoslovakia	16.81	—	—	16.81	Q
14T	Warwick Selvey	Australia	16.81	—	—	16.81	Q
16	Eugeniusz Kwiatkowski	Poland	X	X	16.71	16.71	
17	Arthur Rowe	Great Britain	16.19	16.42	16.68	16.68	
18	Georgios Tsakanikas	Greece	16.44	16.22	16.38	16.44	
19	Erik Uddebom	Sweden	16.31	16.09	16.27	16.31	
20	Fritz Kühl	United Team of Germany	15.71	15.71	15.69	15.71	
21	Gideon Ariel	Israel	14.56	14.65	14.57	14.65	
22	Salem El-Jisr	Lebanon	13.34	13.82	13.50	13.82	
23	Nayef Mohamed Hameed	Iraq	13.52	12.61	13.65	13.65	
24	Haider Khan	Pakistan	13.53	13.47	13.26	13.53	
—	Todor Artarski	Bulgaria	DNS				
—	Bruno Graf	Switzerland	DNS				
—	Nuri Turan	Turkey	DNS				
—	Vilmos Varjú	Hungary	DNS				

=== Final ===
Rank	Athlete	Nation	1	2	3	4	5	6	Distance	Notes
1st place, gold medalist(s)	Bill Nieder	United States	18.67 OR	18.77	X	18.67	19.68 OR	X	19.68	OR
2nd place, silver medalist(s)	Parry O'Brien	United States	18.77 OR	19.11 OR	X	18.64	17.41	18.39	19.11	
3rd place, bronze medalist(s)	Dallas Long	United States	16.80	18.88 OR	18.66	18.25	X	19.01	19.01	
4	Viktor Lipsnis	Soviet Union	17.28	17.90	17.51	X	X	17.83	17.90	
5	Mike Lindsay	Great Britain	17.63	17.63	17.80	17.09	17.39	17.43	17.80	
6	Alfred Sosgórnik	Poland	17.57	17.57	X	X	17.52	17.39	17.57	
7	Dieter Urbach	United Team of Germany	17.34	17.05	17.47	Did not advance			17.47	
8	Martyn Lucking	Great Britain	17.05	16.71	17.43	Did not advance			17.43	
9	Jiří Skobla	Czechoslovakia	17.31	17.39	X	Did not advance			17.39	
10	Jaroslav Plíhal	Czechoslovakia	17.35	17.36	17.27	Did not advance			17.36	
11	Les Mills	New Zealand	16.86	16.09	17.06	Did not advance			17.06	
12	Hermann Lingnau	United Team of Germany	16.65	16.98	16.66	Did not advance			16.98	
13	Silvano Meconi	Italy	X	16.73	X	Did not advance			16.73	
14	Zsigmond Nagy	Hungary	X	16.67	X	Did not advance			16.67	
15	Warwick Selvey	Australia	16.18	15.93	15.76	Did not advance			16.18	
