= Athletics at the 1964 Summer Olympics – Men's shot put =

Men's shot put at the Games of the XVIII Olympiad
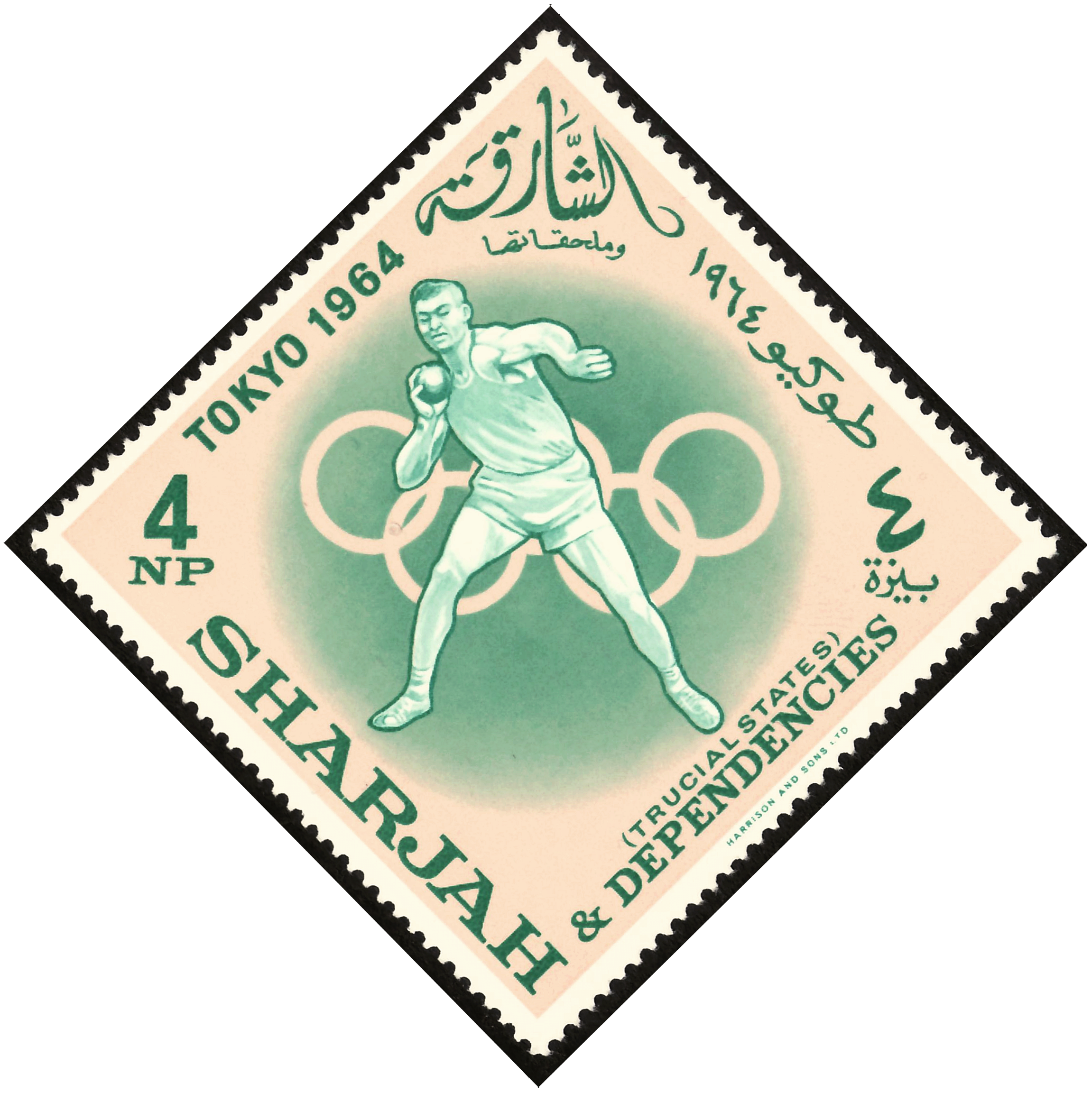
- Men's shot put at the 1964 Olympics on a stamp of Sharjah
- Venue: Olympic Stadium
- Date: 17 October 1964
- Competitors: 22 from 13 nations
- Winning time: 20.33 OR

Medalists
| 1st place, gold medalist(s) | | Dallas Long; United States |
| 2nd place, silver medalist(s) | | Randy Matson; United States |
| 3rd place, bronze medalist(s) | | Vilmos Varju; Hungary |

Official Video Highlights @40:15 Video on YouTube

The men's shot put was one of four men's throwing events on the Athletics at the 1964 Summer Olympics program in Tokyo. It was held on 17 October 1964. 25 athletes from 15 nations entered, with 3 not starting in the qualification round. The maximum number of athletes per nation had been set at 3 since the 1930 Olympic Congress. The event was won by Dallas Long of the United States, the nation's fifth consecutive and 13th overall victory in the men's shot put. His teammate Randy Matson took silver, making 1964 the fifth straight Games the Americans had finished one-two. A second consecutive sweep was prevented when Vilmos Varju of Hungary took third over American Parry O'Brien. Long was the sixth man to win two shot put medals (adding to his 1960 bronze); Matson would later become the seventh (winning gold in 1968). O'Brien's fourth place finish kept him from being the first man to win four—he had taken gold in 1952 and 1956 and silver in 1960.

== Background ==
This was the 15th appearance of the event, which is one of 12 athletics events to have been held at every Summer Olympics. Returning finalists from the 1960 Games were silver medalist (and 1952 and 1956 gold medalist) Parry O'Brien and bronze medalist Dallas Long of the United States, fourth-place finisher Viktor Lipsnis of the Soviet Union, fifth-place finisher Mike Lindsay and eighth-place finisher Martyn Lucking of Great Britain, sixth-place finisher Alfred Sosgórnik of Poland, eleventh-place finisher Les Mills of New Zealand, thirteenth-place finisher (and 1956 finalist) Silvano Meconi of Italy, and fourteenth-place finisher Zsigmond Nagy of Hungary. O'Brien was attempting to be the first man to win three gold medals or four medals overall in the shot put, though he was not as dominant as he had been in the 1950s. Long had broken the world record four times since the Rome Games and was favored, with the third American (teenager Randy Matson) a strong challenger.

The Ivory Coast, South Korea, and Morocco each made their debut in the men's shot put. The United States appeared for the 15th time, the only nation to have competed in all Olympic shot put competitions to date.

== Competition format ==
The competition used the two-round format introduced in 1936, with the qualifying round completely separate from the divided final. In qualifying, each athlete received three attempts; those recording a mark of at least 17.80 metres advanced to the final. If fewer than 12 athletes achieved that distance, the top 12 would advance. The results of the qualifying round were then ignored. Finalists received three throws each, with the top six competitors receiving an additional three attempts. The best distance among those six throws counted.

== Records ==
These were the standing world and Olympic records (in metres) prior to the 1964 Summer Olympics.

| World record | Dallas Long (USA) | 20.68 | Los Angeles, United States | 25 July 1964 |
| Olympic record | Bill Nieder (USA) | 19.68 | Rome, Italy | 31 August 1960 |

Randy Matson broke the Olympic record with his third throw of the final, at 19.88 metres. He extended his new record to 20.20 metres, in his fourth throw. Dallas Long, however, throwing in the order immediately after Matson, took over the record with his gold medal throw of 20.33 metres.

== Schedule ==
All times are Japan Standard Time (UTC+9)

| Date | Time | Round |
|---|---|---|
| Saturday, 17 October 1964 | 10:00; 15:00 | Qualifying; Final |

== Results ==
=== Qualification ===
The qualification standard was 17.80 metres. Each thrower had three attempts to reach that standard.

| Rank | Athlete | Nation | 1 | 2 | 3 | Distance | Notes |
|---|---|---|---|---|---|---|---|
| 1 | Dallas Crutcher Long | United States | 19.51 | — | — | 19.51 | Q |
| 2 | Randy Matson | United States | 18.92 | — | — | 18.92 | Q |
| 3 | Viktor Lipsnis | Soviet Union | 18.90 | — | — | 18.90 | Q |
| 4 | Vilmos Varju | Hungary | 18.26 | — | — | 18.26 | Q |
| 5 | Zsigmond Nagy | Hungary | 18.14 | — | — | 18.14 | Q |
| 6 | Władysław Komar | Poland | 18.05 | — | — | 18.05 | Q |
| 6 | Les Mills | New Zealand | 18.05 | — | — | 18.05 | Q |
| 6 | Georgios Tsakanikas | Greece | 17.72 | 17.25 | 18.05 | 18.05 | Q |
| 9 | Rudolf Langer | United Team of Germany | 17.90 | — | — | 17.90 | Q |
| 10 | Adolfas Varanauskas | Soviet Union | 17.86 | — | — | 17.86 | Q |
| 11 | Parry O'Brien | United States | 17.84 | — | — | 17.84 | Q |
| 12 | Nikolay Karasyov | Soviet Union | 17.83 | — | — | 17.83 | Q |
| 13 | Dieter Hoffmann | United Team of Germany | 17.45 | X | 17.82 | 17.82 | Q |
| 14 | Heinfried Birlenbach | United Team of Germany | 17.10 | 16.79 | 17.77 | 17.77 | |
| 15 | Alfred Sosgórnik | Poland | X | 17.75 | X | 17.75 | |
| 16 | Martyn Lucking | Great Britain | X | X | 17.67 | 17.67 | |
| 17 | Silvano Meconi | Italy | 17.29 | 17.20 | X | 17.29 | |
| 18 | Lahcen Samsam Akka | Morocco | X | 17.24 | X | 17.24 | |
| 19 | Mike Lindsay | Great Britain | 16.77 | 16.70 | 17.23 | 17.23 | |
| 20 | Segui Denis Kragbe | Ivory Coast | 16.20 | 16.59 | 16.38 | 16.59 | |
| 21 | Teruo Itokawa | Japan | 15.73 | 15.84 | 15.56 | 15.84 | |
| 22 | Im Ho-geun | South Korea | 13.47 | 13.64 | 13.37 | 13.64 | |
| — | Edmund Piątkowski | Poland | DNS | | | | |
| — | Gideon Ariel | Israel | DNS | | | | |
| — | Gheorghe Zîmbresteanu | Romania | DNS | | | | |

=== Final ===
The scores from the qualification round were ignored for the final. Each thrower received three attempts; the six that had thrown the longest in those three threw another three times each.

| Rank | Athlete | Nation | 1 | 2 | 3 | 4 | 5 | 6 | Distance | Notes |
|---|---|---|---|---|---|---|---|---|---|---|
| 1st place, gold medalist(s) | Dallas Long | United States | 19.61 | 19.55 | 19.34 | 20.33 OR | 19.09 | X | 20.33 | OR |
| 2nd place, silver medalist(s) | Randy Matson | United States | 18.53 | 19.19 | 19.88 OR | 20.20 OR | X | 19.62 | 20.20 | |
| 3rd place, bronze medalist(s) | Vilmos Varju | Hungary | 19.23 | X | 19.39 | 19.29 | 18.97 | 19.25 | 19.39 | |
| 4 | Parry O'Brien | United States | 18.95 | 18.86 | 19.20 | 18.32 | 18.62 | 18.84 | 19.20 | |
| 5 | Zsigmond Nagy | Hungary | 18.77 | X | 18.50 | 18.43 | X | 18.88 | 18.88 | |
| 6 | Nikolay Karasiov | Soviet Union | 18.86 | 18.26 | X | 18.14 | 17.98 | 18.18 | 18.86 | |
| 7 | Les Mills | New Zealand | 18.19 | 18.50 | 18.52 | Did not advance | | | 18.52 | |
| 8 | Adolf Varanauskas | Soviet Union | X | 18.30 | 18.41 | Did not advance | | | 18.41 | |
| 9 | Władysław Komar | Poland | 18.20 | X | X | Did not advance | | | 18.20 | |
| 10 | Victor Lipsnis | Soviet Union | 17.45 | 17.86 | 18.11 | Did not advance | | | 18.11 | |
| 11 | Rudolf Langer | United Team of Germany | 17.29 | 16.90 | X | Did not advance | | | 17.29 | |
| 12 | Dieter Hoffmann | United Team of Germany | X | X | 17.11 | Did not advance | | | 17.11 | |
| 13 | Georges Tsakinikas | Greece | 16.87 | X | 16.38 | Did not advance | | | 16.87 | |
