= 1958 European Athletics Championships – Men's shot put =

Men's shot put at the European Athletics Championships

The men's shot put at the 1958 European Athletics Championships was held in Stockholm, Sweden, at Stockholms Olympiastadion on 23 August 1958.

== Medalists ==
Gold	Arthur Rowe; Great Britain
Silver	Viktor Lipsnis; Soviet Union
Bronze	Jiří Skobla; Czechoslovakia

== Results ==
=== Final ===
23 August

Rank	Name	Nationality	Result	Notes
1st place, gold medalist(s)	Arthur Rowe	Great Britain	17.78	CR NR
2nd place, silver medalist(s)	Viktor Lipsnis	Soviet Union	17.47	
3rd place, bronze medalist(s)	Jiří Skobla	Czechoslovakia	17.12	
4	Hermann Lingnau	West Germany	17.07	
5	Silvano Meconi	Italy	16.98	
6	Vladimir Loshchilov	Soviet Union	16.96	
7	Vilmos Varjú	Hungary	16.77	
8	Alfred Sosgórnik	Poland	16.65	
9	Dieter Urbach	West Germany	16.65	
10	Todor Artarski	Bulgaria	16.48	
11	Eugeniusz Kwiatkowski	Poland	16.33	
12	Jaroslav Plíhal	Czechoslovakia	16.26	
13	Joel Eklund	Sweden	16.20	
14	Martyn Lucking	Great Britain	16.02	
15	Aksel Thorsager	Denmark	15.88	
16	Georgios Tsakanikas	Greece	15.73	
17	Gunnar Huseby	Iceland	15.62	

=== Qualification ===
23 August

Rank	Name	Nationality	Result	Notes
1	Hermann Lingnau	West Germany	17.00	Q
2	Alfred Sosgórnik	Poland	16.79	Q
3	Viktor Lipsnis	Soviet Union	16.76	Q
4	Vladimir Loshchilov	Soviet Union	16.75	Q
5	Jiří Skobla	Czechoslovakia	16.75	Q
6	Silvano Meconi	Italy	16.07	Q
7	Arthur Rowe	Great Britain	16.04	Q
8	Vilmos Varjú	Hungary	15.95	Q
9	Georgios Tsakanikas	Greece	15.91	Q
10	Dieter Urbach	West Germany	15.89	Q
11	Joel Eklund	Sweden	15.76	Q
12	Martyn Lucking	Great Britain	15.74	Q
13	Todor Artarski	Bulgaria	15.61	Q
14	Jaroslav Plíhal	Czechoslovakia	15.60	Q
15	Gunnar Huseby	Iceland	15.50	Q
16	Aksel Thorsager	Denmark	15.45	Q
17	Eugeniusz Kwiatkowski	Poland	15.32	Q
18	Mario Monti	Italy	14.53	

== Participation ==
According to an unofficial count, 18 athletes from 12 countries participated in the event.

- Bulgaria (1)
- Czechoslovakia (2)
- Denmark (1)
- Greece (1)
- Hungary (1)
- Iceland (1)
- Italy (2)
- Poland (2)
- Soviet Union (2)
- Sweden (1)
- Great Britain (2)
- West Germany (2)
