= Athletics at the 1961 Summer Universiade – Men's shot put =

The men's shot put event at the 1961 Summer Universiade was held at the Vasil Levski National Stadium in Sofia, Bulgaria, in September 1961.

== Results ==
Rank	Athlete	Nationality	Result	Notes
1st place, gold medalist(s)	Viktor Lipsnis	Soviet Union	18.00	
2nd place, silver medalist(s)	Dieter Urbach	West Germany	17.64	
3rd place, bronze medalist(s)	Zsigmond Nagy	Hungary	17.57	
4	Martyn Lucking	Great Britain	17.41	
5	David Harrison	Great Britain	16.63	
6	Todor Artarski	Bulgaria	16.34	
7	Matti Yrjölä	Finland	16.08	
8	Valcho Ivanov	Bulgaria	15.54	
9	Hans Sölch	West Germany	15.34	
10	Jacek Majchrowski	Poland	14.78	
12	Henk van Aarst	Netherlands	14.41	
