= 1962 European Athletics Championships – Men's shot put =

Men's shot put at the European Athletics Championships

The men's shot put at the 1962 European Athletics Championships was held in Belgrade, then Yugoslavia, at JNA Stadium on 14 September 1962.

== Medalists ==
Gold	Vilmos Varjú; Hungary
Silver	Viktor Lipsnis; Soviet Union
Bronze	Alfred Sosgórnik; Poland

== Results ==
=== Final ===
14 September

Rank	Name	Nationality	Result	Notes
1st place, gold medalist(s)	Vilmos Varjú	Hungary	19.02	CR
2nd place, silver medalist(s)	Viktor Lipsnis	Soviet Union	18.38	
3rd place, bronze medalist(s)	Alfred Sosgórnik	Poland	18.26	
4	Władysław Komar	Poland	18.00	
5	Zsigmond Nagy	Hungary	17.97	
6	Jiří Skobla	Czechoslovakia	17.87	
7	Dieter Urbach	West Germany	17.58	
8	Milija Jocović	Yugoslavia	17.55	
9	Martyn Lucking	Great Britain	17.47	
10	Mike Lindsay	Great Britain	17.23	
11	Peter Gratz	East Germany	17.09	
12	Jarmo Kunnas	Finland	17.06	
13	Eugeniusz Kwiatkowski	Poland	17.05	
14	Rudolf Langer	East Germany	16.95	
15	Boško Tomasović	Yugoslavia	16.95	

=== Qualification ===
14 September

Rank	Name	Nationality	Result	Notes
1	Viktor Lipsnis	Soviet Union	18.00	CR Q
2	Zsigmond Nagy	Hungary	17.91	Q
3	Vilmos Varjú	Hungary	17.81	Q
4	Alfred Sosgórnik	Poland	17.71	Q
5	Milija Jocović	Yugoslavia	17.46	Q
6	Mike Lindsay	Great Britain	17.44	Q
7	Jiří Skobla	Czechoslovakia	17.31	Q
8	Władysław Komar	Poland	17.22	Q
9	Eugeniusz Kwiatkowski	Poland	17.12	Q
10	Dieter Urbach	West Germany	17.13	Q
11	Boško Tomasović	Yugoslavia	17.12	Q
12	Peter Gratz	East Germany	17.12	Q
13	Jarmo Kunnas	Finland	17.08	Q
14	Martyn Lucking	Great Britain	17.06	Q
15	Rudolf Langer	East Germany	17.05	Q
16	Silvano Meconi	Italy	16.93	
17	Jean-Claude Ernwein	France	16.82	
18	Aksel Thorsager	Denmark	16.22	
19	Bjørn Bang Andersen	Norway	16.12	
20	André Godard	France	15.71	

== Participation ==
According to an unofficial count, 20 athletes from 13 countries participated in the event.

- Czechoslovakia (1)
- Denmark (1)
- East Germany (2)
- Finland (1)
- France (2)
- Hungary (2)
- Italy (1)
- Norway (1)
- Poland (3)
- Soviet Union (1)
- Great Britain (2)
- West Germany (1)
- Yugoslavia (2)
