= Athletics at the 1959 Summer Universiade – Men's shot put =

The men's shot put event at the 1959 Summer Universiade was held at the Stadio Comunale di Torino in Turin on 3 September 1959.

== Medalists ==
Gold	Silver	Bronze
Hermann Lingnau; West Germany	Zsigmond Nagy; Hungary	Georgios Tsakanikas; Greece

== Results ==
=== Qualification ===
Qualification mark: 14.00 metres

Rank	Athlete	Nationality	Result	Notes
1	Hermann Lingnau	West Germany	17.33	Q
2	Zsigmond Nagy	Hungary	16.62	Q
3	Martyn Lucking	Great Britain	16.53	Q
4	Dako Radošević	Yugoslavia	14.86	Q
5	Gerald Harrison	Great Britain	14.52	Q
6	Piero Monguzzi	Italy	14.50	Q
7	Emilio Poli	Italy	14.29	Q
8	Eugeniusz Wachowski	Poland	14.27	Q
9	Georgios Tsakanikas	Greece	14.24	Q
10	Jean-Pierre Lassau	France	14.09	Q
11	Henk van Aarst	Netherlands	13.94	q
12	Salem El Djirs	Lebanon	13.94	q
13	Czesław Snieżyński	Poland	13.93	
14	Francis Delecourt	France	13.49	

=== Final ===
Rank	Name	Nationality	Result	Notes
1st place, gold medalist(s)	Hermann Lingnau	West Germany	17.32	
2nd place, silver medalist(s)	Zsigmond Nagy	Hungary	17.10	
3rd place, bronze medalist(s)	Georgios Tsakanikas	Greece	16.70	
4	Martyn Lucking	Great Britain	16.59	
5	Dako Radošević	Yugoslavia	16.34	
6	Gerald Harrison	Great Britain	16.83	
7	Piero Monguzzi	Italy	16.32	
8	Jean-Pierre Lassau	France	15.01	
