= Dieter Urbach =

German shot putter (born 1935)

Personal information
- Nationality: German
- Born: 2 February 1935 (age 91) Hagen, North Rhine-Westphalia
- Height: 1.95 m (6 ft 5 in)

Sport
- Sport: Athletics
- Event: Shot put
Medal record
Representing West Germany
Summer Universiade
Silver medal – second place	1961 Sofia	Shot put
Bronze medal – third place	1963 Porto Alegre	Shot put
Bronze medal – third place	1963 Porto Alegre	Discus throw

Dietrich "Dieter" Urbach (born 2 February 1935) is a German athlete who specialized in the shot put, also competing on a high level in the discus throw.

== Career ==
In the shot put, Urbach finished ninth at the 1958 European Championships, seventh at the 1960 Summer Olympics, won the silver medal at the 1961 Summer Universiade, finished seventh at the 1962 European Championships and won the bronze medal at the 1963 Summer Universiade. In the discus throw he finished sixth at the 1961 Summer Universiade and won the bronze medal at the 1963 Summer Universiade.

Urbach won his first national championship medal at the West German championships in 1955, a bronze medal in the shot put. He followed with three silver medals in a row, another bronze in 1959, before winning the championships in 1960, 1961, 1962, 1963 and 1964. He represented the clubs VfL Bochum and from 1957 TSV 1860 München. Indoors, he won bronze in 1954 and 1955, silver in 1958 and 1961, and gold in 1962, 1963 and 1964. He also competed in the discus throw, taking national silver medals in 1956, 1961 and 1963 and bronze in 1958.

Urbach set eight West German records in the shot put, nine years apart. First, his 16.65 metres in October 1955 in Freiburg broke a 19-year old record by Hans Woellke (that had also been equalled by Heinrich Trippe during World War II). However, 16.65 stood for less than a year before Karl-Heinz Wegmann overtook it, breaking the 17-metre barrier. Hermann Lingnau had then pushed the record to 17.51 when Urbach set back-to-back records in April 1961, with 17.68 and then 17.83. In July 1961, Hermann Lingnau put 17.89 metres before Urbach replied two days later with 18.06. Before the year was over, Urbach had achieved 18.08, then 18.28.

In 1962 and 1963, Rudolf Langer came along with four improvements of the record. In April 1964, Urbach reclaimed the record for the fourth time, putting 18.71 metres, followed by 19.09 metres in September the same year. This record stood until 1967.
