= Alex Moore =

Alex or Alexander Moore may refer to:

- Alex Moore (dancer) (1901–1991), pioneer of modern ballroom dancing
- Alex Moore (footballer) (1918–1989), Australian footballer for Collingwood
- Alex Moore (rugby union) (born 1963), Scottish rugby player
- Alex Moore (wrestler) (born 1997), Canadian amateur wrestler
- Alex Moore (running back) (born 1945), American football player
- Alexander Moore (diplomat) (1867–1930), American diplomat, editor and publisher
- Alexander Moore (politician) (1874–1952), Member of the Legislative Assembly of Alberta, 1919–1926
- Whistlin' Alex Moore (1899–1989), American blues pianist
- Alex Moore, singer/songwriter, lead guitarist for The Lathums
- Alexander Moore (soldier) (1830–1910), Irish-American soldier
