= Lingnau =

Lingnau is a surname. Notable people with the surname include:

- Corinna Lingnau (born 1960), German field hockey player
- Devrim Lingnau (born 1998), German and Turkish actress
- Hermann Lingnau (1936–2018), German shot putter
