= Plíhal =

Plíhal (feminine: Plíhalová) is a Czech surname. Notable people with the surname include:

- James Plihal (born 1996), American rower
- Jaroslav Plíhal (1936–1997), Czech athlete
- Karel Plíhal (born 1958), Czech musician
- Tomáš Plíhal (born 1983), Czech ice hockey player
