= Athletics at the 1963 Summer Universiade – Men's shot put =

The men's shot put event at the 1963 Summer Universiade was held at the Estádio Olímpico Monumental in Porto Alegre in September 1963.

== Results ==
Rank	Athlete	Nationality	Result	Notes
1st place, gold medalist(s)	Zsigmond Nagy	Hungary	18.44	
2nd place, silver medalist(s)	Mike Lindsay	Great Britain	17.76	
3rd place, bronze medalist(s)	Dieter Urbach	West Germany	17.72	
4	Milija Jocović	Yugoslavia	16.43	
5	Ferdinand Zastrow	West Germany	16.26	
6	Alberto Díaz	Spain	15.64	
7	Alain Drufin	France	15.45	
8	Urs Trautmann	Switzerland	13.90	
9	Mário Parashim	Brazil	11.54	
