= Boris Belyayev =

Soviet athlete

Personal information
- Nationality: Soviet
- Born: 23 February 1933 (age 93)

Sport
- Sport: Athletics
- Event: Shot put

Boris Belyayev (born 23 February 1933) is a Soviet athlete. He competed in the men's shot put at the 1956 Summer Olympics.
