= Ken Bantum =

American shot putter (born 1935)

Personal information
- Nationality: American
- Born: March 16, 1935 (age 91)

Sport
- Sport: Athletics
- Event: Shot put

Ken Bantum (born March 16, 1935) is an American athlete. He competed in the men's shot put at the 1956 Summer Olympics.

Competing for the Manhattan Jaspers track and field program, Bantum won the 1956 NCAA Track and Field Championships in the shot put.
