= Alfred Sosgórnik =

Polish shot putter (1933–2013)

Personal information
- Nationality: Polish
- Born: 16 August 1933 Zawadzkie, Poland
- Died: 8 February 2013 (aged 79)
- Height: 1.91 m (6 ft 3 in)
- Weight: 120 kg (265 lb)

Sport
- Sport: Athletics
- Event: Shot put
- Club: Spójnia Warszaw; Górnik Zabrze
Medal record
Men's athletics
Representing Poland
European Championships
Bronze medal – third place	1962 Belgrade	Shot put

Alfred Jerzy Sosgórnik (16 August 1933 – 8 February 2013) was a Polish athlete. He competed in the men's shot put at both the 1960 and 1964 Summer Olympics.

His personal best in the event is 19.24 metres set in 1963. He was the first Pole to surpass the 17, 18 and 19 metre barriers in shot put.

== International competitions ==
Year	Competition	Venue	Position	Event	Notes
Representing Poland
1958	European Championships	Stockholm, Sweden	8th	Shot put	16.65 m
1960	Olympic Games	Rome, Italy	6th	Shot put	17.57 m
1962	European Championships	Belgrade, Serbia	3rd	Shot put	18.26 m
1964	Olympic Games	Tokyo, Japan	15th (q)	Shot put	17.75 m
1965	European Cup Final	Stuttgart, West Germany	2nd	Shot put	18.38 m
1966	European Championships	Budapest, Hungary	4th	Shot put	18.38 m
