= Im Ho-geun =

South Korean shot putter

Personal information
- Nationality: South Korean
- Born: 1 November 1939 (age 86)

Sport
- Sport: Athletics
- Event: Shot put

Im Ho-geun (born 1 November 1939) is a South Korean athlete. He competed in the men's shot put at the 1964 Summer Olympics.

In July 1960, he set a new South Korean record in the shot put with a 15.03 m throw at the Seoul Student Athletics Competition.
