= Athletics at the 1963 Summer Universiade – Men's discus throw =

The men's discus throw event at the 1963 Summer Universiade was held at the Estádio Olímpico Monumental in Porto Alegre in September 1963.

== Results ==
Rank	Athlete	Nationality	Result	Notes
1st place, gold medalist(s)	Gaetano Dalla Pria	Italy	51.63	
2nd place, silver medalist(s)	Mike Lindsay	Great Britain	51.23	
3rd place, bronze medalist(s)	Dieter Urbach	West Germany	51.03	
4	Vasil Iliev	Bulgaria	47.80	
5	Milija Jocović	Yugoslavia	46.10	
6	Ferdinand Zastrow	West Germany	43.38	
7	Ceferino Andara	Venezuela	42.50	
8	Cláudio Romanini	Brazil	42.49	
9	Urs Trautmann	Switzerland	40.53	
10	Mário Parashim	Brazil	36.87	
