= Eugeniusz Kwiatkowski (athlete) =

Polish shot putter

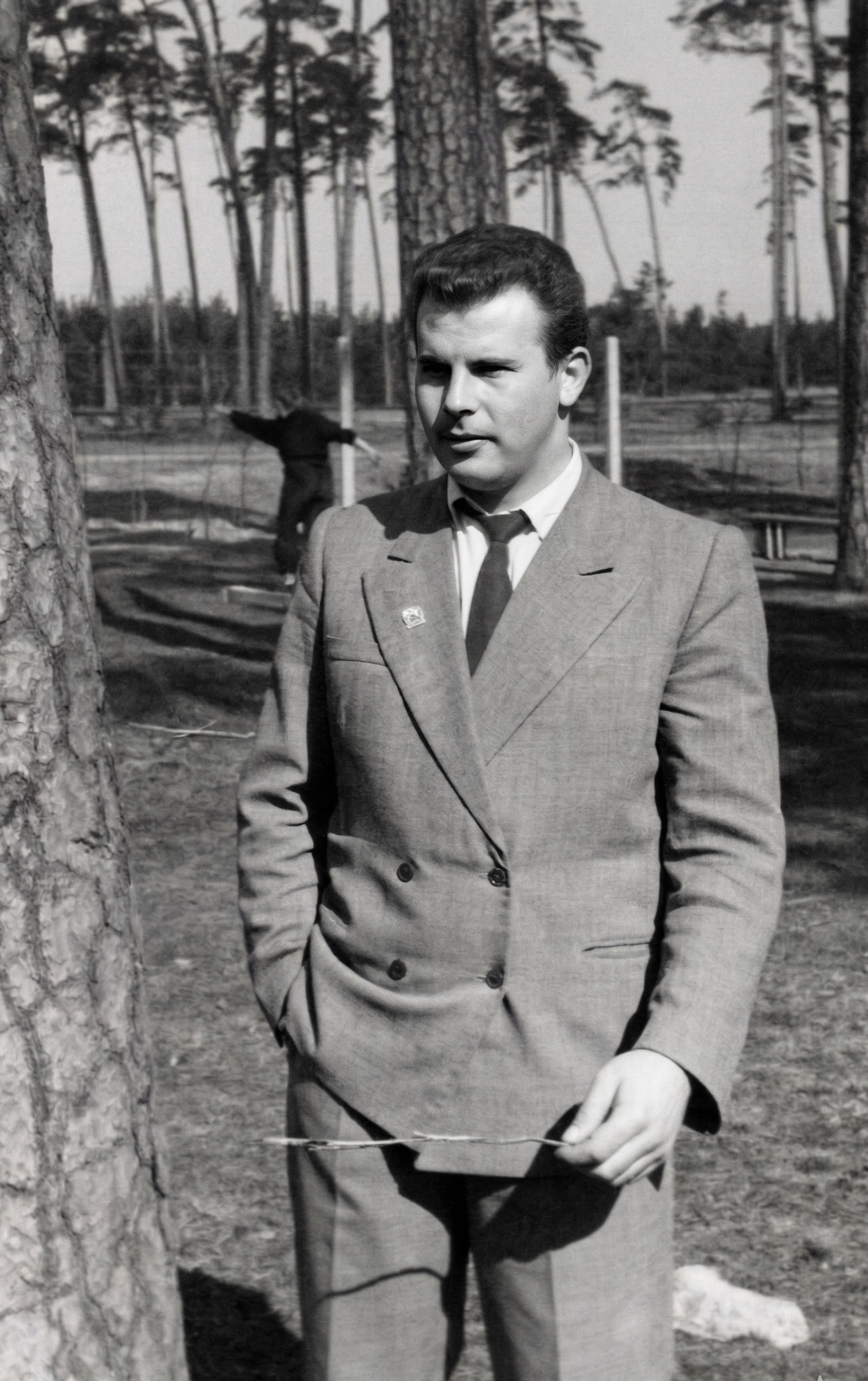

Personal information
- Nationality: Polish
- Born: 22 November 1932 Bądkowo, Poland
- Died: 9 February 1985 (aged 52) Bydgoszcz, Poland
- Height: 1.80 m (5 ft 11 in)
- Weight: 95 kg (209 lb)

Sport
- Sport: Athletics
- Event: Shot put
- Club: Zawisza Bydgoszcz

Eugeniusz Kwiatkowski (22 November 1932 – 9 February 1985) was a Polish athlete. He competed in the men's shot put at the 1960 Summer Olympics.

== International competitions ==
Year	Competition	Venue	Position	Event	Notes
Representing Poland
1958	European Championships	Stockholm, Sweden	11th	Shot put	16.33 m
1960	Olympic Games	Rome, Italy	16th (q)	Shot put	16.71 m
1962	European Championships	Belgrade, Serbia	13th	Shot put	17.05 m

== Personal bests ==
- Shot put – 18.24 (Bydgoszcz 1963)
- Discus throw – 45.14 (Warsaw 1957)
- Hammer throw – 59.68 (Gdańsk 1959)
