= Salem El-Jisr =

Lebanese shot putter (born 1932)

Personal information
- Nationality: Lebanese
- Born: 1 January 1932 Beirut, Lebanon

Sport
- Sport: Athletics
- Event: Shot put

Salem El-Jisr (born 1 January 1932) is a Lebanese former athlete. He competed in the men's shot put at the 1960 Summer Olympics.
