= Adolfas Varanauskas =

Lithuanian shot putter (1934–2007)

Personal information
- Nationality: Lithuanian
- Born: 4 February 1934 Paliepis, Lithuania
- Died: 12 January 2007 (aged 72) Kaunas, Lithuania

Sport
- Sport: Athletics
- Event: Shot put

Adolfas Varanauskas (Адольфас Варанаускас, 4 February 1934 – 12 January 2007) was a Lithuanian athlete. He competed in the men's shot put at the 1964 Summer Olympics, representing the Soviet Union.
