= Athletics at the 1961 Summer Universiade – Men's discus throw =

The men's discus throw event at the 1961 Summer Universiade was held at the Vasil Levski National Stadium in Sofia, Bulgaria, on 31 August 1961.

== Results ==
Rank	Athlete	Nationality	Result	Notes
1st place, gold medalist(s)	Edmund Piątkowski	Poland	59.15	
2nd place, silver medalist(s)	Kaupo Metsur	Soviet Union	54.20	
3rd place, bronze medalist(s)	Virgil Manolescu	Romania	52.52	
4	Ladislav Petrovic	Czechoslovakia	52.31	
5	Vasil Iliev	Bulgaria	50.69	
6	Dieter Urbach	West Germany	50.35	
7	Herbert Egermann	Austria	48.52	
8	Eugeniusz Wachowski	Poland	48.38	
9	Georgi Gyurov	Bulgaria	48.37	
10	John Sheldrick	Great Britain	46.51	
11	David Harrison	Great Britain	45.67	
12	Ramazan Driza	Albania	40.22	
