= Barry Donath =

Australian shot putter

Personal information
- Nationality: Australian
- Born: 30 December 1932
- Died: 1 December 2001 (aged 68) Barrie, Ontario, Canada

Sport
- Sport: Athletics
- Event: Shot put
Medal record
Men's athletics
Representing Australia
British Empire and Commonwealth Games
Bronze medal – third place	1958 Cardiff	shot put

Barry William Donath (30 December 1932 – 1 December 2001) was an Australian athlete. He competed in the men's shot put at the 1956 Summer Olympics.
