= Nayef Mohamed Hameed =

Iraqi athlete

Personal information
- Nationality: Iraqi
- Born: 1929

Sport
- Sport: Athletics
- Events: Shot put Discus

Nayef Mohamed Hameed (born 1929, date of death unknown) was an Iraqi athlete. He competed in the men's shot put and the men's discus throw at the 1960 Summer Olympics.
