= Dallas Long =

American track and field athlete (1940–2024)

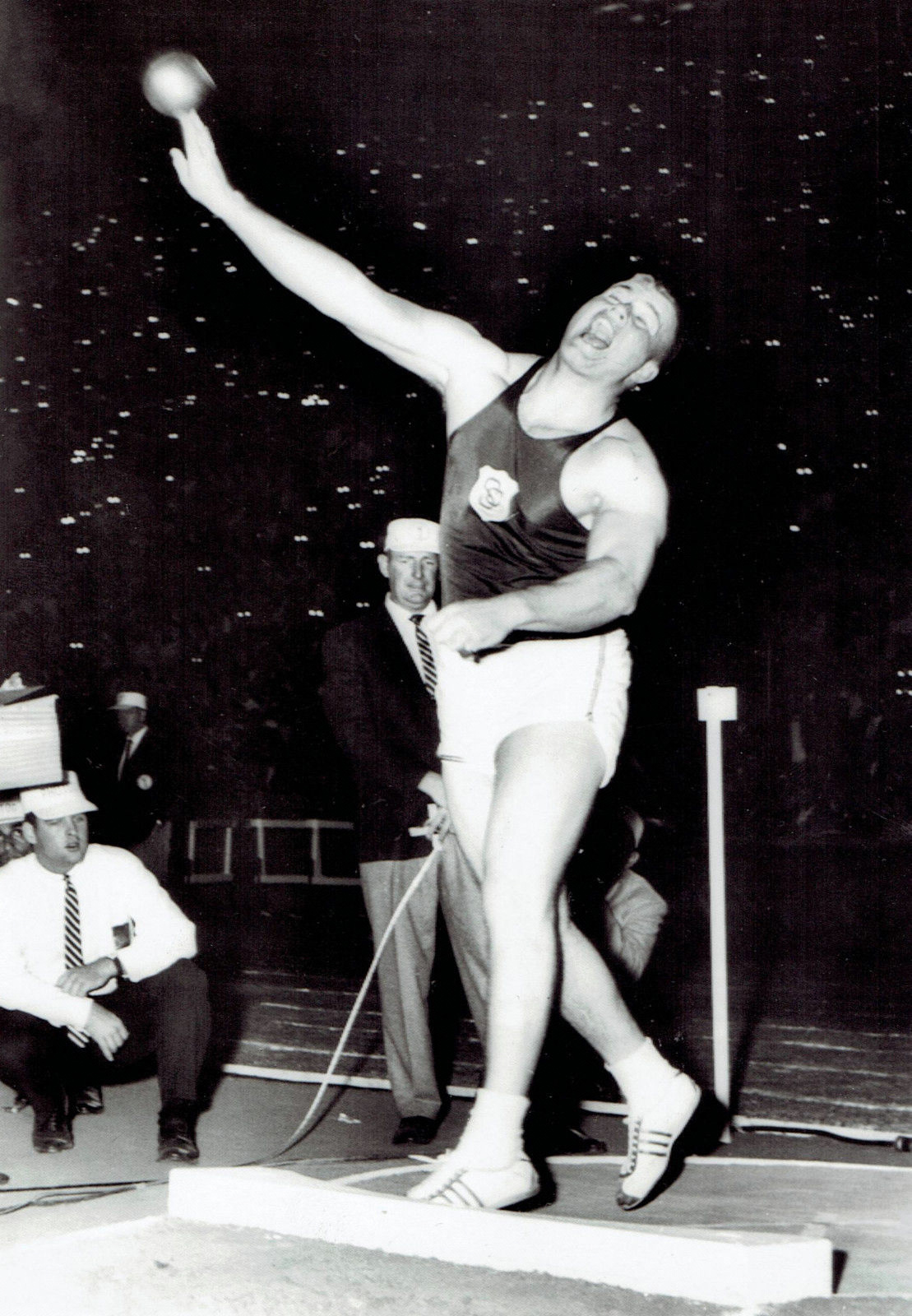
- Long in 1960

Personal information
- Full name: Dallas Crutcher Long
- Born: June 13, 1940 Pine Bluff, Arkansas, U.S.
- Died: November 10, 2024 (aged 84) Whitefish, Montana, U.S
- Height: 193 cm (6 ft 4 in)
- Weight: 118 kg (260 lb)

Sport
- Sport: Athletics
- Events: Shot put, discus throw
- Club: Pasadena Athletic and Country Club

Achievements and titles
- Personal bests: SP – 20.68 m (1964); DT – 52.51 m (1961)
Medal record
Representing the United States
Olympic Games
Gold medal – first place	1964 Tokyo	Shot put
Bronze medal – third place	1960 Rome	Shot put
Pan American Games
Silver medal – second place	1959 Chicago	Shot put

Pathe film of his last world record @1:20 Video on YouTube

Dallas Crutcher Long (June 13, 1940 – November 10, 2024) was an American track and field athlete, who mostly competed in the shot put. Between 1959 and 1964 he set six official and five unofficial world records.

== Sports Achievements ==
His first world record was at the 1959 Santa Barbara Easter Relays, the last in 1964 in the USA vs USSR dual meet. Long attended the University of Southern California. He competed at the 1960 Summer Olympics, where he won a bronze medal behind fellow Americans Bill Nieder and Parry O'Brien. One of his coaches was Frantisek (Frank) Louda, an American-Czech who had held the European hammer throw record in the 1930s. Long returned four years later to Tokyo for the 1964 Summer Olympics and won a gold medal. Domestically he won the AAU title in 1961 and the NCAA title in 1960–62.

While a senior at North High School in Phoenix, Arizona, he set the National High School Record in the shot put. He was Track and Field News "High School Athlete of the Year" in 1958.

Long's best mark in the shot put was a then-world record of 20.68 meters (67 ft 10 in) set at the U.S.-U.S.S.R. dual meet in 1964.

He was a member of the SoCal Olympians.

== Later Life and Career ==
In 1962, Long entered USC's dental school. After retiring from competitions, Long became a dentist and a physician specializing in emergency medicine, having studied at the Washington University School of Medicine. He and his wife Barbara lived in Dover Shores, Newport Beach. He served as a defense witness in the Rodney King trial against the Los Angeles Police Department police officers Laurence Powell and Stacey Koon in early 1993. In 1996, he was inducted into the National Track and Field Hall of Fame.

By 2020, Dallas had retired, remarried and moved to Whitefish, Montana, with his wife Suzanne. He died there while under hospice care from complications of Parkinson's disease, on November 10, 2024, at the age of 84.
