= Athletics at the 1956 Summer Olympics – Men's shot put =

Men's shot put at the Games of the XVI Olympiad
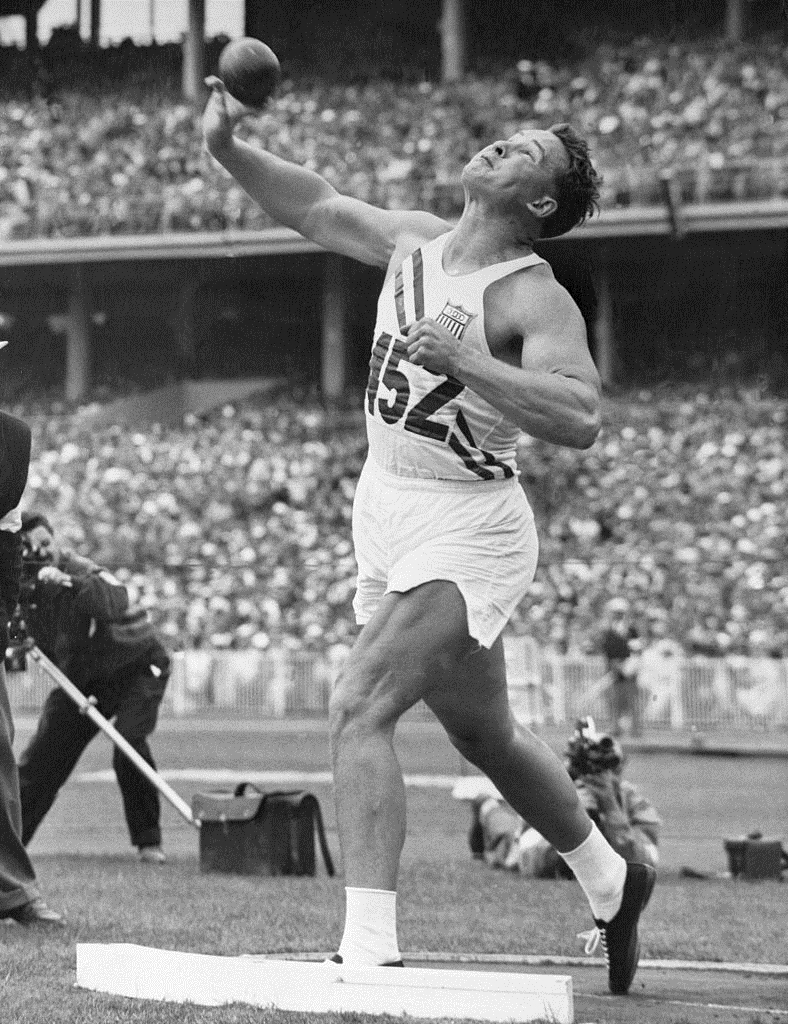
- Parry O'Brien
- Venue: Olympic Park Stadium
- Date: 28 November 1956
- Competitors: 14 from 10 nations
- Winning distance: 18.57 OR

Medalists
1st place, gold medalist(s)		Parry O'Brien	United States
2nd place, silver medalist(s)		Bill Nieder	United States
3rd place, bronze medalist(s)		Jiří Skobla	Czechoslovakia

Video on YouTube Official Video

The men's shot put was an event at the 1956 Summer Olympics in Melbourne, Australia. The event was also known at the time as putting the weight. The qualifying round and the final both were held on Wednesday November 28, 1956. Fourteen shot putters from ten nations competed. The maximum number of athletes per nation had been set at 3 since the 1930 Olympic Congress.

Parry O'Brien had held the world record for three years. In that time he had added a meter and a quarter to the previous record, including the current world record he had set just two months earlier. He was also the defending champion. On his first throw of the competition, he improved upon his own Olympic record with a 17.92m. Jiří Skobla moved into second place with 17.39m. In the second round, O'Brien threw a second Olympic record 18.47m, which would prove to be enough to win the competition. Bill Nieder moved into second place with a 17.61m, improving to a 17.81m in the third round which proved to be enough to take silver. While he didn't improve, O'Brien threw consistently just behind his second round mark. His best throw was in the fifth round, his third Olympic record of the day 18.57 m (60 ft 11 in). Any of O'Brien's last five throws would have won the competition. Just before the 18.57, Nieder threw his best of 18.18m. During that fifth round, Ken Bantum briefly moved into bronze medal position with a 17.48m putting the American team in a position to sweep the event for the second time in a row, before Skobla threw three additional cm past him. On his final throw Skobla threw his best of 17.65m. O'Brien's victory was the third consecutive and 11th overall victory for an American shot putter; O'Brien was the fourth man to win two shot put medals and the second man to win two gold medals. It was the third straight Games in which the United States took the first two places, with Skobla's bronze (Czechoslovakia's first shot put medal since 1932) blocking a third straight medal sweep for the Americans.

== Background ==
This was the 13th appearance of the event, which is one of 12 athletics events to have been held at every Summer Olympics. Returning finalists from the 1952 Games were gold medalist Parry O'Brien of the United States and ninth-place finisher Jiří Skobla of Czechoslovakia. O'Brien has "established himself as the greatest putter in the world," having broken the world record multiple times since the previous Games and introduced a new shot put technique involving a half turn.

Australia made its debut in the men's shot put; Germany competed for the first time as the "United Team of Germany". The United States appeared for the 13th time, the only nation to have competed in all Olympic shot put competitions to date.

== Competition format ==
The competition used the two-round format introduced in 1936, with the qualifying round completely separate from the divided final. In qualifying, each athlete received three attempts; those recording a mark of at least 15.00 metres advanced to the final. If fewer than 12 athletes achieved that distance, the top 12 would advance. The results of the qualifying round were then ignored. Finalists received three throws each, with the top six competitors receiving an additional three attempts. The best distance among those six throws counted.

== Records ==
These were the standing world and Olympic records (in metres) prior to the 1956 Summer Olympics.

World record	Parry O'Brien (USA)	19.25	Los Angeles, United States	1 November 1956
Olympic record	Parry O'Brien (USA)	17.41	Helsinki, Finland	21 July 1952

Parry O'Brien's first throw of the final, 17.92 metres, broke the Olympic record. He extended his new record on his second throw (18.47 metres) and fifth throw (18.57 metres), though all six of his throws were beyond the old record. Three of four legal throws by Bill Nieder also exceeded the old record; Jiří Skobla had two throws and Ken Bantum had one throw beyond the 17.41 metres mark.

== Schedule ==
All times are Australian Eastern Standard Time (UTC+10)

Date	Time	Round
Wednesday, 27 November 1956	10:00; 14:30	Qualifying; Final

== Results ==
=== Qualifying ===
The qualifying round was held despite there being only 14 athletes with at least 12 guaranteed to move to the final. All 14 men who started the competition reached the qualifying mark of 15.00 metres, so no athlete was eliminated in the qualifying round.

Rank	Athlete	Nation	1	2	3	Distance	Notes
1	Jiří Skobla	Czechoslovakia	17.15	—	—	17.15	Q
2	Bill Nieder	United States	16.76	—	—	16.76	Q
3	Parry O'Brien	United States	16.63	—	—	16.63	Q
4	Barry Donath	Australia	16.57	—	—	16.57	Q
5	Erik Uddebom	Sweden	16.35	—	—	16.35	Q
6	Silvano Meconi	Italy	16.19	—	—	16.19	Q
7	Georgios Tsakanikas	Greece	14.93	15.99	—	15.99	Q
8	Ken Bantum	United States	15.76	—	—	15.76	Q
9	Karl-Heinz Wegmann	United Team of Germany	15.73	—	—	15.73	Q
10	Vladimir Loshchilov	Soviet Union	15.63	—	—	15.63	Q
11	Robert Hanlin	Australia	15.62	—	—	15.62	Q
12	Raymond Thomas	France	15.42	—	—	15.42	Q
13	Barclay Palmer	Great Britain	15.19	—	—	15.19	Q
14	Boris Belyayev	Soviet Union	15.03	—	—	15.03	Q
—	Todor Artarski	Bulgaria	DNS				
—	Gerry Carr	Great Britain	DNS				
—	Vartan Ovsepian	Soviet Union	DNS				
—	Mark Pharaoh	Great Britain	DNS				

=== Final ===
Rank	Athlete	Nation	1	2	3	4	5	6	Distance	Notes
1st place, gold medalist(s)	Parry O'Brien	United States	17.92 OR	18.47 OR	18.37	18.45	18.57 OR	18.23	18.57	OR
2nd place, silver medalist(s)	Bill Nieder	United States	X	17.61	17.81	16.82	18.18	X	18.18	
3rd place, bronze medalist(s)	Jiří Skobla	Czechoslovakia	17.39	16.70	17.34	17.51	17.05	17.65	17.65	
4	Ken Bantum	United States	16.99	X	16.27	17.48	X	X	17.48	
5	Boris Belyayev	Soviet Union	16.96	16.05	16.58	15.96	16.11	16.24	16.96	
6	Erik Uddebom	Sweden	16.54	X	16.65	15.74	16.06	16.31	16.65	
7	Karl-Heinz Wegmann	United Team of Germany	16.43	16.63	16.37	Did not advance			16.63	
8	Georgios Tsakanikas	Greece	X	16.56	15.52	Did not advance			16.56	
9	Barry Donath	Australia	X	16.52	16.01	Did not advance			16.52	
10	Silvano Meconi	Italy	X	16.28	15.83	Did not advance			16.28	
11	Robert Hanlin	Australia	15.76	16.08	15.50	Did not advance			16.08	
12	Barclay Palmer	Great Britain	15.81	15.17	15.65	Did not advance			15.81	
13	Vladimir Loshchilov	Soviet Union	15.62	15.33	15.39	Did not advance			15.62	
14	Raymond Thomas	France	15.11	15.28	15.31	Did not advance			15.31	
