= Bill Nieder =

American shot putter (1933–2022)

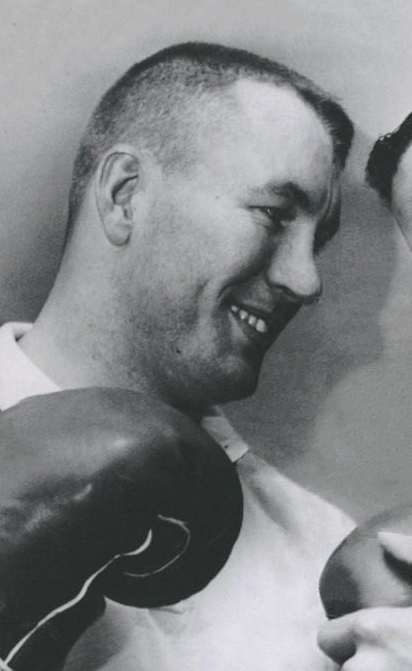
- Nieder in 1960

Personal information
- Born: August 10, 1933 Hempstead, New York, U.S.
- Died: October 7, 2022 (aged 89) Angels Camp, California, U.S.
- Education: University of Kansas
- Height: 190 cm (6 ft 3 in)
- Weight: 102 kg (225 lb)

Sport
- Sport: Athletics
- Events: Shot put, discus throw
- Club: U.S. Army

Achievements and titles
- Personal bests: SP – 20.06 m (1960); DT – 45.72 m (1955)
Medal record
Representing the United States
Olympic Games
Gold medal – first place	1960 Rome	Shot put
Silver medal – second place	1956 Melbourne	Shot put

William Henry Nieder (August 10, 1933 – October 7, 2022) was an American athlete who mainly competed shot put winning gold medal in the 1960 Summer Olympics and silver medal in the 1956 Summer Olympics.

Nieder was born in Hempstead, New York, and grew up in Lawrence, Kansas.

Bill competed in the 1956 Olympics in Melbourne. He was married to his wife Sue at the time and had a daughter Connie of about one year of age. At those Games he won a silver medal, losing to Parry O'Brien. Four years later, he placed fourth at the U.S. Olympic Trials, and was selected to the national team only after Dave Davis withdrew due to an injury. At the Olympics Nieder won a gold medal with a throw of 19.68 m. The mark set a new Olympic record and was an improvement of 5 feet from his mark 4 years earlier. Parry O'Brien had also improved over that time but was almost 2 feet behind Nieder.

A graduate of the University of Kansas, Nieder was the first collegiate athlete to better the 60-foot mark with a 16-pound shot. He was also the first high school prep athlete to break the 60-foot barrier with a 12-pound shot put.

Nieder, who set the shot put world record on three occasions, tried boxing when his track and field career ended following the 1960 Olympics. He was knocked out in his first bout and hung up the gloves for good.

Nieder was employed by 3M as a salesman, and as an Olympic medal holder with a persuasive knack for presenting things in the most favorable light, Nieder helped sell the first ever synthetic track surface for an Olympic Games to the 1968 Mexico City Olympics organizers. Such tracks are now standard at all major track meets. Using proprietary formulas from 3M, Nieder later developed a new version of the rubber room that helped stomp out his competition who were unable to create a formula that satisfied fire safety standards.

In 2006 Nieder was inducted into National Track and Field Hall of Fame.

Nieder helped subdue a passenger attempting to enter the cockpit of American Airlines flight 1561 headed to San Francisco on Sunday, May 8, 2011. He was 77 years old at the time and surrounding passengers who witnessed the altercation said Nieder arose from his seat to go to the bathroom, when he unknowingly bumped into the passenger intending to enter cockpit, allowing American Airline attendants to prevent the passenger from ultimately entering the cockpit.

== Death ==
On October 11, 2022, it was announced by the University of Kansas that Nieder had died in the previous week at the age of 89.

Records
Preceded by Dallas Long	Men's shot put March 19, 1960 – March 26, 1960	Succeeded by Dallas Long
Preceded by Dallas Long	Men's shot put April 2, 1960 – May 18, 1962	Succeeded by Dallas Long
