= Jiří Skobla =

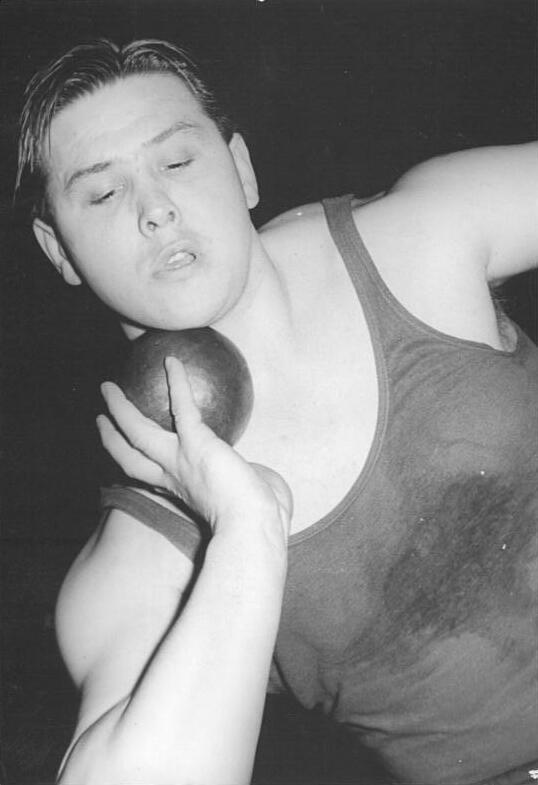
- Skobla in 1957

Medal record

Men's athletics

Representing Czechoslovakia

Olympic Games
Bronze medal – third place	1956 Melbourne	Shot put

European Championships
Gold medal – first place	1954 Bern	Shot put
Bronze medal – third place	1958 Stockholm	Shot put

Jiří Skobla (6 April 1930 – 18 November 1978) was a Czech athlete who competed for Czechoslovakia, mainly in the shot put. Born in Prague, he was the son of former Olympic heavyweight weightlifting champion Jaroslav Skobla.

== Life and career ==
Skobla was born on 6 April 1930 in Prague. His first success was a gold medal at the 1954 European Athletics Championships – a feat that no other Czech has been able to replicate since. He was the bronze medallist at the event at the 1958 European Athletics Championships and placed sixth in 1962. He competed for Czechoslovakia at the Olympics on three occasions: 1952, 1956 and 1960. His best performance was in the 1956 Summer Olympics held in Melbourne, Australia, where he won the bronze medal. His final international medal, a bronze, came at the 1966 European Indoor Games.

Skobla died of kidney cancer in Prague. The autopsy results were not released, but it was widely believed his death may have been associated with steroid use.
