= Håkon Askerød =

Norwegian footballer (1910-1989)

Personal information
- Full name: Håkon Ludvig Askerød
- Date of birth: 5 July 1910
- Place of birth: Rygge, Norway
- Date of death: 28 August 1989 (aged 79)
- Position: Goalkeeper

International career
Years	Team	Apps	(Gls)
1935	Norway	1	(0)

Håkon Askerød (5 July 1910 – 28 August 1989) was a Norwegian footballer. He played in one match for the Norway national football team in 1935.
