= László Willinger =

Jewish-German photographer (1909–1989)

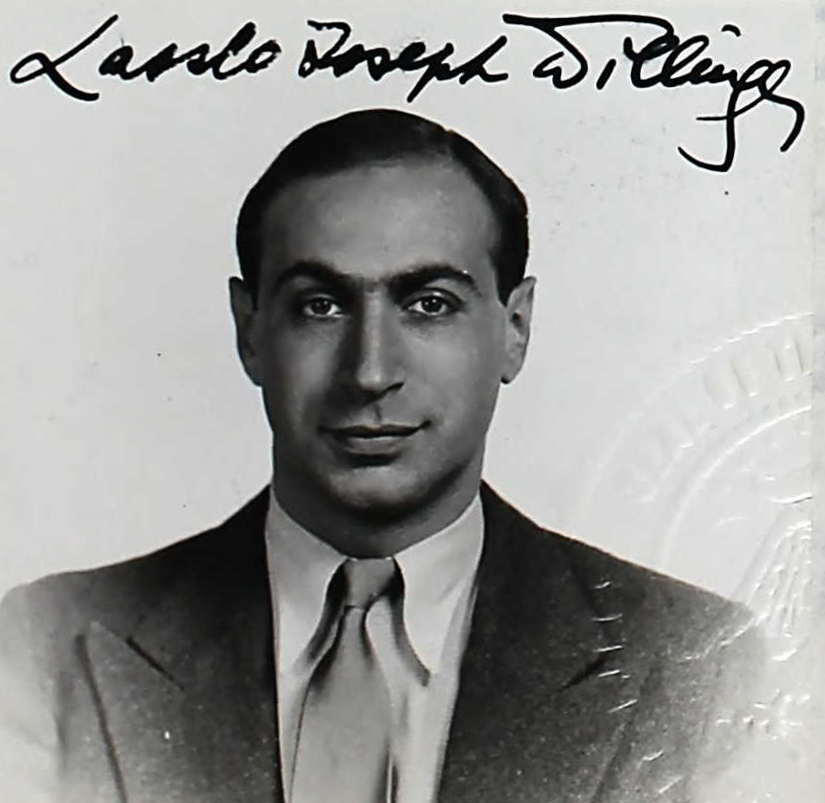
Willinger portrait from 1938

László Josef Willinger (16 April 1909 – 8 August 1989) was a Jewish-German photographer who later became based in the United States. He is best known for his portrait photography of film stars and celebrities, a career he began in 1937.

== Biography ==
Willinger was born on 16 April 1909, either in Berlin, Germany, or Budapest, Hungary, to Margaret Willinger, also a photographer. He established photographic studios in Paris and Berlin in 1929 and 1931, respectively, while also submitting his photographs as a freelance contributor to various newspapers. Willinger left Berlin in 1933 when Adolf Hitler became chancellor, settling in Vienna, where he began photographing celebrities such as Marlene Dietrich, Hedy Lamarr, Pietro Mascagni, Sigmund Freud, Carl Jung, and Max Reinhardt.

By the mid-1930s, Willinger was traveling through Africa and Asia before being invited by studio photographer Eugene Robert Richee to move to the United States.

He sailed on the S/S Ile de France as a first-cabin passenger, departing Le Havre, France, on 30 June 1937 and arriving at the Port of New York on 6 July. His nationality was recorded as Austrian. Willinger entered the U.S. with a nonimmigrant visa. Eventually, he decided to stay. To comply with American immigration regulations, he had to leave the country and re-enter with a U.S. immigrant visa. He went to Mexico, obtained the visa, and re-crossed into the United States at Mexicali, Mexico, on 20 December 1937. He then resided in Los Angeles, California.

After establishing a studio in Hollywood, California, Willinger became a frequent contributor to magazines and periodicals, providing cover portraits of some of the most popular stars. He was one of the first Hollywood photographers to experiment with color photography.

In his later years, shortly before his death, Willinger was accused of stalking some celebrities, including Charlie Chaplin. An investigation into the matter led to the discovery of thousands of personal photographs of the male comedy star.

Willinger died of heart failure on 8 August 1989 at Cedars-Sinai Medical Center in Los Angeles.

== Legacy ==
Several of his portraits are held in the collection of the National Portrait Gallery, London.

== Gallery ==
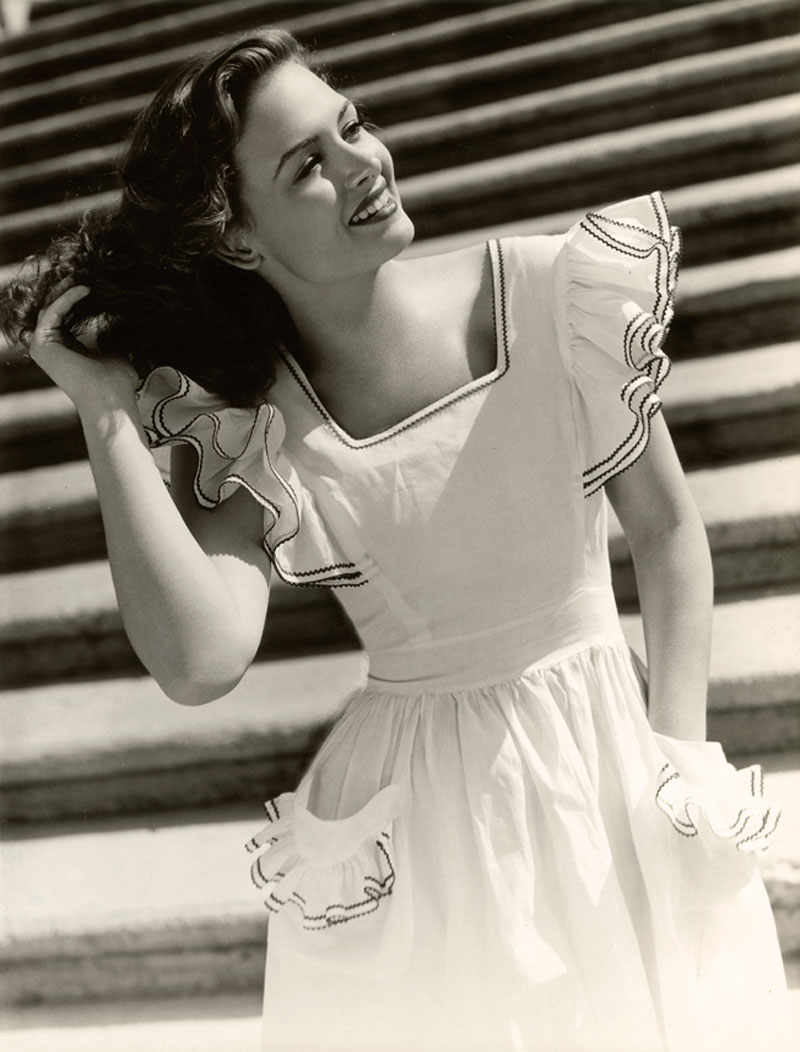
Studio portrait photo / headshot of Donna Reed by László Willinger.

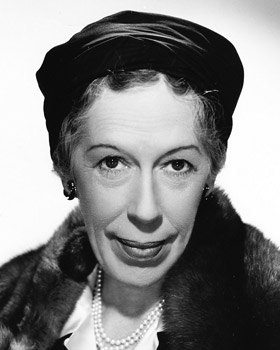
Studio portrait photo / headshot of Edna May Oliver by László Willinger.

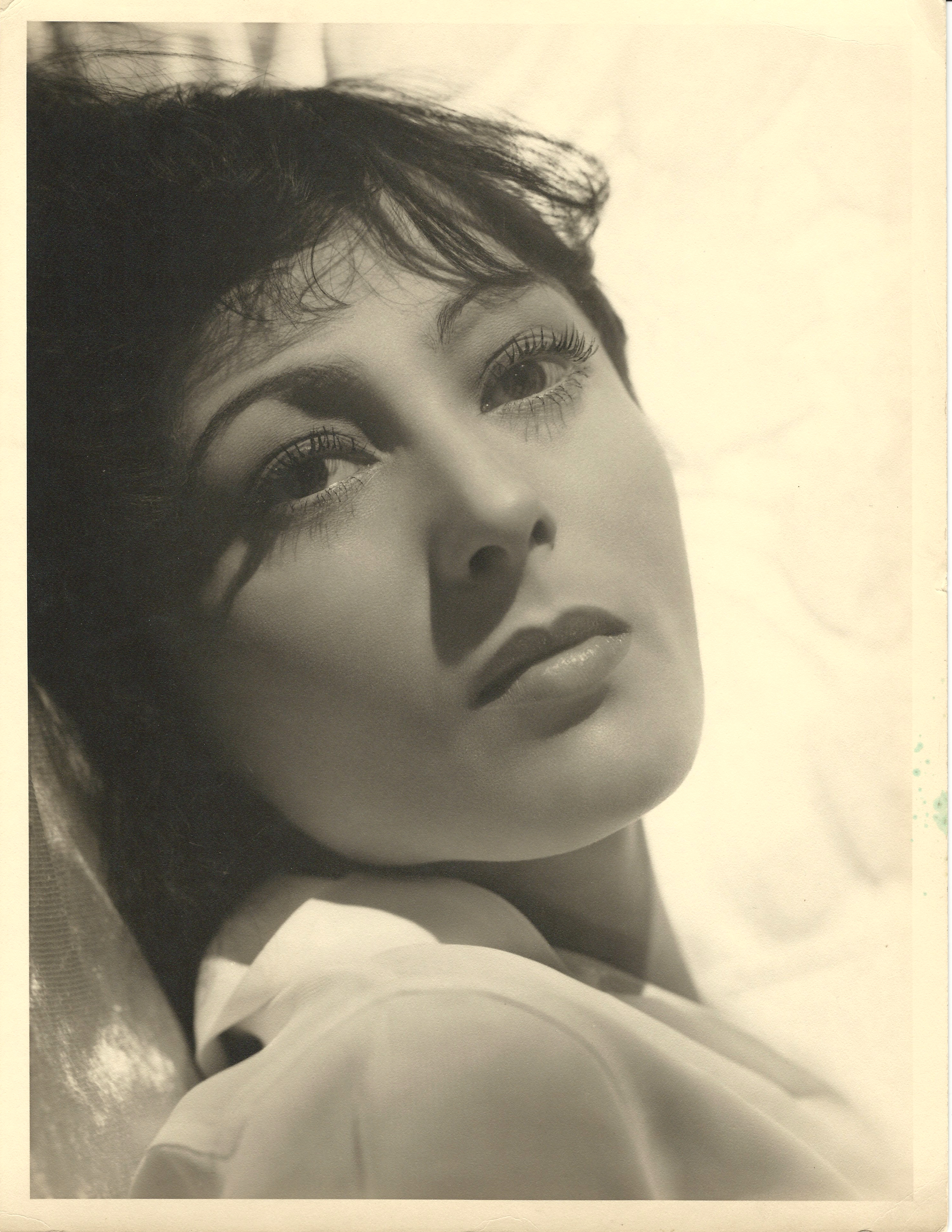
Studio portrait photo / headshot of Luise Rainer by László Willinger for Metro-Goldwyn-Mayer, ca. 1937.
