= Max Ballantyne =

Australian rules footballer (1944–1989)

Personal information
- Full name: John Maxwell Ballantyne
- Born: 4 August 1944
- Died: 30 August 1989 (aged 45)
- Original team: University Blacks/Collegians
- Height: 183 cm (6 ft 0 in)
- Weight: 80 kg (176 lb)

Playing career^{1}
Years	Club	Games (Goals)
1966	Collingwood	1 (0)
- ^{1} Playing statistics correct to the end of 1966.

John Maxwell (Max) Ballantyne (4 August 1944 – 30 August 1989) was an Australian rules footballer who played with Collingwood in the Victorian Football League (VFL).
