= Vladimir Loshchilov =

Soviet shot putter

Personal information
- Nationality: Soviet
- Born: 29 April 1932
- Died: 15 August 1999 (aged 67)

Sport
- Sport: Athletics
- Event: Shot put

Vladimir Loshchilov (29 April 1932 – 15 August 1999) was a Soviet athlete. He competed in the men's shot put at the 1956 Summer Olympics.
