= Don Rainsford =

Australian rules footballer

Personal information
- Full name: Donald Edward Rainsford
- Born: 17 September 1937; Deloraine, Tasmania
- Died: 31 August 1989 (aged 51); Melbourne, Victoria
- Original team: Burnie (NWFU)
- Height: 189 cm (6 ft 2 in)
- Weight: 90 kg (198 lb)

Playing career^{1}
Years	Club	Games (Goals)
1959	Carlton	3 (1)
- ^{1} Playing statistics correct to the end of 1959.

Donald Edward Rainsford (17 September 1937 – 31 August 1989) was an Australian rules footballer and broadcaster who played with Carlton in the Victorian Football League (VFL).

== Family ==
The son of Claude Edward Rainsford (1905–1963) and Elsie Louisa Rainsford, née Smith (1909–1992), Donald Edward Rainsford and his twin brother Malcolm John Rainsford were born at Deloraine, Tasmania on 17 September 1937.

== Radio and TV career ==
Rainsford had been working as a radio announcer at 7SD in Scottsdale, Tasmania when he relocated to Melbourne in 1959 to play football for Carlton. In the same year he joined top-rating Melbourne radio station 3UZ, where he remained until 1967, and he was subsequently heard on Melbourne's 3DB and 3AW. He became a familiar voice-over announcer on Melbourne television station HSV7 where his work included VFL football-related content.

== Death ==
Don Rainsford died of cancer aged 51 in 1989, leaving behind a widow and three children. A memorial plaque can be found at the Scottsdale Cemetery in Tasmania.
