= Dink Roberts =

American old-time banjo player

James "Dink" Roberts (September 15, 1894 – August 30, 1989) was an American old-time banjo player. His performances, which were recorded in the 1970s by folklorists, illustrate a style of playing that predates the blues.

Born in Chatham County, North Carolina, Roberts learned the artistry of the banjo from local black musicians, including Mince Phillips, a close friend and fellow performer, and other performers in Alamance County. As a young adult, Roberts worked as a tenant farmer, and became well-respected among both black and white field hands when he performed at dances among other types of gatherings.

His archaic clawhammer picking style was "noticeably different (among other things, more rhythmically complex, i.e., 'syncopated', for lack of a better term)", compared to many of Roberts's contemporaries. Folklorist Cece Conway, in her analysis of Roberts's better-known recording, "Coo Coo", described his playing as "fascinating in how he constructs melody and wonders off on tangents mid-song that seem both random and perfectly expected at the same time".

Roberts was visited by Conway and Scott Odell to record him at his home in 1974; the results appear on the compilation album Black Banjo Songsters of North Carolina and Virginia.

Occasionally, Roberts returned to performing. Most notably, he made an appearance at the Winter Folk Festival in 1976.

His life and music were the subject of the short documentary film Dink: A Pre-Blues Musician (1975).

Roberts died in 1989; he was 94 years old.
