= Max Scott =

Australian rules footballer

Personal information
- Full name: Alexander McPherson Scott
- Born: 3 November 1906; Cheltenham, Victoria
- Died: 12 August 1989 (aged 82)
- Original team: Moorabbin

Playing career^{1}
Years	Club	Games (Goals)
1929, 1931	South Melbourne	19 (0)
- ^{1} Playing statistics correct to the end of 1931.

Alexander McPherson Scott (3 November 1906 – 12 August 1989) was an Australian rules footballer who played with South Melbourne in the Victorian Football League (VFL).
