= Arthur Rowe (athlete) =

English shot putter (1936–2003)

Personal information
- Nationality: British (English)
- Born: 17 August 1936 Smithies, Barnsley, England
- Died: 13 September 2003 (aged 67) Barnsley, England
- Height: 187 cm (6 ft 2 in)
- Weight: 100 kg (220 lb)

Sport
- Sport: Athletics
- Event: shot put
- Club: Doncaster Plant Works AC
Medal record
Men's athletics
Representing Great Britain
European Championships
Gold medal – first place	1958 Stockholm	Shot put
Representing England
British Empire and Commonwealth Games
Gold medal – first place	1958 Cardiff	Shot put

Arthur Rowe (17 August 1936 – 13 September 2003) was a track and field athlete from England who competed at the 1960 Summer Olympics.

== Biography ==
Rowe was born in Smithies, near Barnsley. After leaving school, he became an apprentice blacksmith before being introduced to shot-putting at the age of 17.

Rowe won five consecutive British AAA Championship shot put titles between 1957 and 1961,

He represented the England athletics team in the shot put at the 1958 British Empire and Commonwealth Games in Cardiff, Wales, winning a gold medal. He also won the gold medal in the men's shot put event at the 1958 European Athletics Championships in Stockholm, Sweden.

He represented Great Britain at the 1960 Summer Olympics in Rome, Italy, but failed to qualify.

Throughout 1960s he participated in Highland games heavy athletics events. Some of his most notable performances include breaking the Weight over bar world record in 1963 and again in 1965.
