= Jaroslav Plíhal =

Czech shot putter

Personal information
- Nationality: Czech
- Born: 30 June 1936 Nymburk, Czechoslovakia
- Died: 29 April 1997 (aged 60)

Sport
- Sport: Athletics
- Event: Shot put

Jaroslav Plíhal (30 June 1936 – 29 April 1997) was a Czech athlete. He competed in the men's shot put at the 1960 Summer Olympics.
