= Karl-Heinz Wegmann =

German shot putter

Personal information
- Nationality: German
- Born: 19 February 1934
- Died: 28 August 1989 (aged 55)

Sport
- Sport: Athletics
- Event: Shot put

Karl-Heinz Wegmann (19 February 1934 – 28 August 1989) was a German athlete. He competed in the men's shot put at the 1956 Summer Olympics.

Shot putter Karl-Heinz Wegmann finished seventh at the 1956 Melbourne Olympic Games. The same year he was the first German to surpass 17 metres. In West Germany he claimed national titles in 1955–56, and 1959, also winning indoors in 1957. He was also active as a weightlifter in the heavyweight class. By profession, he was an electrician.

Personal Best: SP – 17.71 (1959).
