= Alex Moore (footballer) =

Australian rules footballer, born 1918

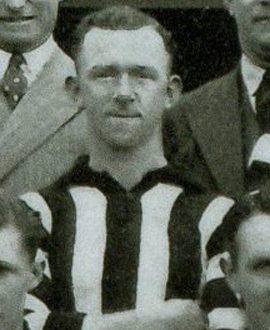
- Moore in 1943

Personal information
- Full name: Alexander Ronald Moore
- Born: 21 December 1917; Collingwood, Victoria
- Died: 28 August 1989 (aged 71); Hampton, Victoria
- Original team: Abbotsford
- Height: 180 cm (5 ft 11 in)
- Weight: 77 kg (170 lb)

Playing career^{1}
Years	Club	Games (Goals)
1943	Collingwood	2 (0)
- ^{1} Playing statistics correct to the end of 1943.

Alexander Ronald Moore (21 December 1917 – 28 August 1989) was an Australian rules footballer who played for the Collingwood Football Club in the Victorian Football League (VFL).

== Family ==
The son of Alexander John Moore, and Veronica Sophia Moore, née Long, Alexander Ronald Moore was born at Collingwood, Victoria on 21 December 1917.

He married Alva Lillian Rosewarne in 1943.

== Military service ==
Moore served in the Australian Army for three years during World War II, being discharged just before he played his two senior games for Collingwood in 1943.

== Death ==
He died at Hampton, Victoria on 28 August 1989.
