= Mike Lindsay =

British athlete (1938–2019)

Michael Lindsay
Personal information
- Nationality: British (Scottish)
- Born: 2 November 1938 Glasgow, Scotland
- Died: 11 December 2019 (aged 81)
- Height: 189 cm (6 ft 2 in)
- Weight: 113 kg (249 lb)

Sport
- Sport: athletics
- Events: Discus, Shot put
- Club: Queen's Park Harriers
Medal record
Representing Scotland
Commonwealth Games
Silver medal – second place	1962 Perth	Discus
Silver medal – second place	1962 Perth	Shot put
Representing Great Britain
Summer Universiade
Silver medal – second place	1963 Porto Alegre	Discus
Silver medal – second place	1963 Porto Alegre	Shot put

Michael Robert Lindsay (2 November 1938 – 11 December 2019) was a British track and field athlete who competed in the discus throw and shot put disciplines. He represented Great Britain at the 1960 Summer Olympics and in the 1964 Summer Olympics.

== Biography ==
Lindsay attended St Marylebone Grammar School. He competed for the Oklahoma Sooners track and field team in the NCAA.

Lindsay became the British discus throw champion after winning the British AAA Championships title at the 1957 AAA Championships and the following year represented Scotland at the 1958 British Empire and Commonwealth Games in Cardiff.

Lindsay regained the AAA discus title in 1959 and retained it in 1960 and shortly afterwards at the 1960 Olympic Games in Rome, he represented Great Britain in both the shot put and discus throw events.

Lindsay remained one of Britain's leading throwers, not only in the shot put but also in the discus and became the British shot put champion after winning the British AAA title at the 1963 AAA Championships. He placed in the top three in the shot put six times at the AAAs in the 1960s.

Lindsay continued to compete internationally for Scotland at the British Empire and Commonwealth Games and made two more appearances in 1962 and 1970. His best performance was a silver medal double at the 1962 British Empire and Commonwealth Games.

He was also a double throws runner-up for Great Britain at the 1963 Summer Universiade, the year before he went to his second Olympic Games in Tokyo, representing Great Britain in the shot put.
