= Viktor Lipsnis =

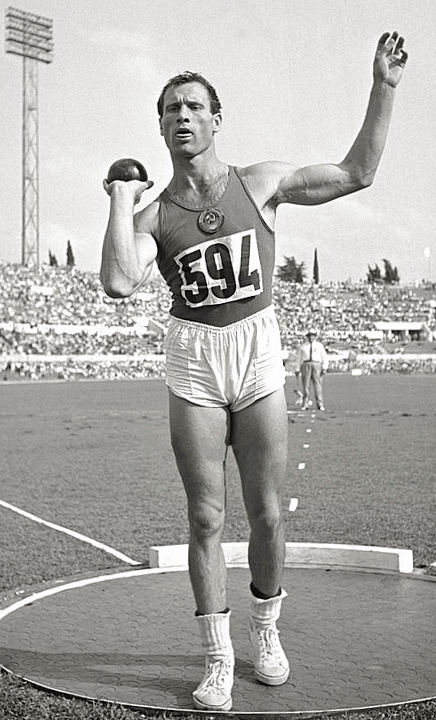
- Viktor Lipsnis at the 1960 Olympics

Personal information
- Born: 6 December 1933 Chernihiv, Ukrainian SSR, Soviet Union
- Died: 25 September 1997 (aged 63) Kyiv, Ukraine
- Height: 1.90 m (6 ft 3 in)
- Weight: 116 kg (256 lb)

Sport
- Sport: Athletics
- Event: Shot put
- Club: Spartak Leningrad; Burevestnik Leningrad; Soviet Army

Achievements and titles
- Personal best: 19.35 m (1964)
Medal record
Men's athletics
Representing Soviet Union
European Championships
Silver medal – second place	1958 Stockholm	Shot put
Silver medal – second place	1962 Belgrade	Shot put
Summer Universiade
Gold medal – first place	1961 Sofia	Shot put

Viktor Lipsnis (Russian: Виктор Липснис, 6 December 1933 – 25 September 1997) was a Soviet shot putter who won silver medals at the 1958 and 1962 European championships. He competed at the 1960 and 1964 Olympics and finished in fourth and tenth place, respectively. Lipsnis was born in Ukraine, but lived through most of his career in Saint Petersburg. He won three Soviet titles (1960–1962) and set eight Soviet records (1958, 1960, 1962, 1964) in the shot put.
