= Hermann Lingnau =

German shot putter (1936–2018)

Personal information
- Born: 22 October 1936 Kassel, Germany
- Died: 16 August 2018 (aged 81) Hochheim am Main, Germany

Sport
- Sport: sport
Medal record
Representing West Germany
Summer Universiade
Gold medal – first place	1959 Turin	Shot put

Hermann Lingnau (22 October 1936 – 16 August 2018) was a German shot putter who competed in the 1960 Summer Olympics. He was born in Kassel.
