= Martyn Lucking =

British shot putter and anti-doping campaigner

Personal information
- Nationality: British (English)
- Born: 24 March 1938 (age 88) Leigh-on-Sea, England
- Height: 191 cm (6 ft 3 in)
- Weight: 102 kg (225 lb)

Sport
- Sport: Athletics
- Event: Shot put
- Club: Southend AC
Medal record
Athletics
Representing England
British Empire & Commonwealth Games
Silver medal – second place	1958 Cardiff	shot put
Gold medal – first place	1962 Perth	shot put

Martyn Taylor Lucking (born 24 March 1938) is a British former shot putter, who became an anti-doping campaigner and tester in Athletics working for the British Athletics Federation.

== Biography ==
Lucking finished third behind Arthur Rowe in the shot put event at the 1957 AAA Championships and finished behind Arthur Rowe every year from 1958 to 1961.

In between at the 1960 Olympic Games in Rome, he represented Great Britain in the shot put competition. Lucking then finished runner-up for three consecutive years at the AAA Championships but because he was the highest placed British athlete in 1962 and 1964 he was considered the British shot put champion.

He topped the podium for England at the 1962 British Empire and Commonwealth Games, improving on his runner-up finish to Arthur Rowe when he represented the England athletics team at the 1958 Games. He also represented Great Britain twice at the European Athletics Championships, competed in the same years as his Commonwealth appearances.

At the 1964 Olympic Games in Tokyo, he represented Great Britain again in the shot put competition.

He later represented England in the shot put, at the 1970 British Commonwealth Games in Edinburgh, Scotland. Lucking was the second UK athlete to throw over 60 feet.

== Anti-doping ==
During the Tokyo Olympic games in 1964, Lucking who was a qualified doctor, felt intimidated against the huge competitors, and found out from them that their weight gain and improved performances had come from taking anabolic steroids. Lucking went to the chair of the British Amateur Athletics Board, Sir Arthur Gold, and they both discovered that there were no rules against using the drugs and so therefore not illegal. Sir Arthur Gold then took this up with both the International Athletics Federation and the International Olympic Committee, and within a few years they were banned after a report from Arthur Porritt, which Lucking had helped write. Lucking would later work as a drug tester for the British Athletics Federation, and was a defendant as part of the Diane Modahl legal case as he was the chair of the disciplinary panel that had found her guilty.
