= Zsigmond Nagy =

Hungarian shot putter

Personal information
- Born: 27 July 1937 Csengőd, Hungary
- Died: 1 March 2010 (aged 72) Budapest, Hungary

Sport
- Sport: Track and field
- Event: Shot put
Medal record
Representing Hungary
Summer Universiade
Gold medal – first place	1963 Porto Alegre	Shot put
Silver medal – second place	1959 Turin	Shot put
Bronze medal – third place	1961 Sofia	Shot put

Zsigmond Nagy (27 July 1937 – 1 March 2010) was a Hungarian shot putter who competed in the 1960 Summer Olympics and in the 1964 Summer Olympics. Nagy held the record for combined left and right hand shot put with total distance of 104 feet 11 inches until it was broken by Parry O'Brien in 1962.
