= Athletics at the 1970 Summer Universiade – Men's triple jump =

The men's triple jump event at the 1970 Summer Universiade was held at the Stadio Comunale in Turin on 4 and 5 September 1970.

== Medalists ==
Gold	Silver	Bronze
Viktor Saneyev; Soviet Union	Nikolay Dudkin; Soviet Union	Jörg Drehmel; East Germany

== Results ==
=== Qualification ===
Qualifying distance: 15.30 m

Rank	Athlete	Nationality	Result	Notes
1	Viktor Saneyev	Soviet Union	16.72	Q, UR
2	Nikolay Dudkin	Soviet Union	16.44	Q
3	Jörg Drehmel	East Germany	15.92	Q
4	Evangelos Vlasis	Greece	15.86	Q
5	Pedro Pérez	Cuba	15.85	Q
6	Nelson Prudêncio	Brazil	15.81	Q
7	Yukito Muraki	Japan	15.74	Q
8	Georgi Stoykovski	Bulgaria	15.73	Q
9	Andreas Baraktiaris	Greece	15.67	Q
10	Juan Velázquez	Cuba	15.58	Q
11	Carol Corbu	Romania	15.57	Q
12	Norberto Capiferri	Italy	15.52	Q
13	Michael Sauer	West Germany	15.50	Q
14	Mohinder Singh Gill	India	15.43	Q
15	Luis Felipe Areta	Spain	15.41	Q
16	Alain Rousselin	France	15.40	Q
17	Milan Spasojević	Yugoslavia	15.37	Q
18	Derek Boosey	Great Britain	15.36	Q
19	Giuseppe Gentile	Italy	15.33	Q
20	David Urhobo Tonitse	Nigeria	15.16	
20	Lawrie Walkley	Australia	15.16	
22	Albert Van Hoorn	Belgium	14.71	
23	John Crotty	Great Britain	14.59	
24	Edward Vincent	Nigeria	14.31	
25	Don Warren	United States	14.08	

=== Final ===
Rank	Name	Nationality	#1	#2	#3	#4	#5	#6	Result	Notes
1st place, gold medalist(s)	Viktor Saneyev	Soviet Union						17.22	17.22	UR
2nd place, silver medalist(s)	Nikolay Dudkin	Soviet Union							17.00	
3rd place, bronze medalist(s)	Jörg Drehmel	East Germany							16.93	
4	Carol Corbu	Romania							16.69	
5	Giuseppe Gentile	Italy	16.38	16.37	16.45	16.39	16.45	x	16.45	
6	Luis Felipe Areta	Spain							16.35	
8	Nelson Prudêncio	Brazil							16.29	
9	Georgi Stoykovski	Bulgaria							16.24	
10	Pedro Pérez Dueñas	Cuba							16.23	
11	Evangelos Vlassis	Greece							15.71	
12	Juan Vélasquez	Cuba							15.71	
13	Yukito Muraki	Japan							15.63	
14	Milan Spasojević	Yugoslavia							15.59	
15	Alain Rousselin	France							15.49	
16	Derek Boosey	Great Britain							15.27	
17	Andreas Baraktiaris	Greece							15.15	
	Norberto Capiferri	Italy							?	
	Mohinder Singh Gill	India							?	
