= Athletics at the 1972 Summer Olympics – Men's triple jump =

Men's triple jump at the Games of the XX Olympiad
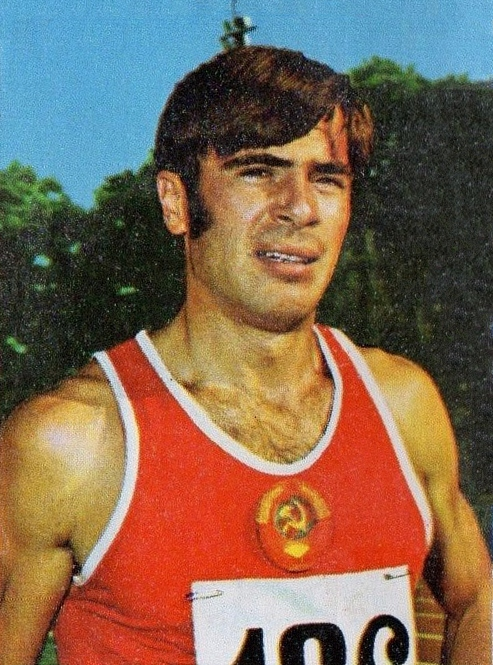
- Viktor Saneyev (1972)
- Venue: Olympic Stadium, Munich, West Germany
- Dates: 3 September 1972 (qualifying); 4 September 1972 (final)
- Competitors: 36 from 28 nations
- Winning distance: 17.35

Medalists
1st place, gold medalist(s)		Viktor Saneyev; Soviet Union
2nd place, silver medalist(s)		Jörg Drehmel; East Germany
3rd place, bronze medalist(s)		Nelson Prudêncio; Brazil

The men's triple jump event at the 1972 Summer Olympics in Munich was held on 3 & 4 of September. Thirty-six athletes from 28 nations competed. The maximum number of athletes per nation had been set at 3 since the 1930 Olympic Congress. The event was won by Viktor Saneyev of the Soviet Union, the fourth man to repeat as Olympic champion in the triple jump. The Soviets were on the podium in the event for the sixth consecutive Games. Jörg Drehmel of East Germany won the first men's triple jump medal by any German jumper. Nelson Prudêncio of Brazil was the ninth man (Saneyev being the eighth) to win a second medal in the event, following up his 1968 silver with bronze in Munich.

== Background ==
This was the 17th appearance of the event, which is one of 12 athletics events to have been held at every Summer Olympics. Returning finalists from the 1968 Games were the top four (gold medalist Viktor Saneyev of the Soviet Union, silver medalist Nelson Prudêncio of Brazil, bronze medalist Giuseppe Gentile of Italy, and fourth-place finisher Art Walker of the United States) as well as eighth-place finisher Mansour Dia of Senegal. Saneyev was a favorite to repeat, but Jörg Drehmel of East Germany had beaten him at the 1971 European championships and was a serious contender for the gold medal. Pedro Pérez of Cuba had broken the world record in winning the Pan American Games, but that jump was an outlier for him and he was not expected to replicate it here.

Kenya, Malawi, and Saudi Arabia each made their first appearance in the event. The United States competed for the 17th time, having competed at each of the Games so far.

== Competition format ==
The competition used the two-round format introduced in 1936. In the qualifying round, each jumper received three attempts to reach the qualifying distance of 16.20 metres; if fewer than 12 men did so, the top 12 (including all those tied) would advance. In the final round, each athlete had three jumps; the top eight received an additional three jumps, with the best of the six to count.

== Records ==
Prior to the competition, the existing World and Olympic records were as follows.

World record	Pedro Pérez (CUB)	17.40	Cali, Colombia	5 August 1971
Olympic record	Viktor Saneyev (URS)	17.39	Mexico City, Mexico	17 October 1968

No new world and Olympic records were set during this competition.

== Schedule ==
All times are Central European Time (UTC+1)

Date	Time	Round
Sunday, 3 September 1972	10:00	Qualifying
Monday, 4 September 1972	16:00	Final

== Results ==
=== Qualifying ===
All jumpers reaching 16.20 m (53 ft 2 in), shown in blue and the top 12 including ties advanced to the final round. All lengths are in metres

Rank	Athlete	Nation	Group	1	2	3	Distance	Notes
1	Viktor Saneyev	Soviet Union	B	16.85	—	—	16.85	Q
2	Jörg Drehmel	East Germany	A	16.57	—	—	16.57	Q
3	Mansour Dia	Senegal	A	16.55	—	—	16.55	Q
4	Carol Corbu	Romania	A	15.59	15.92	16.51	16.51	Q
5	Toshiaki Inoue	Japan	A	16.01	16.19	16.49	16.49	Q
6	Michał Joachimowski	Poland	B	16.43	—	—	16.43	Q
7	Nélson Prudêncio	Brazil	B	—	—	16.42	16.42	Q
8	Kristen Fløgstad	Norway	A	X	16.41	—	16.41	Q
9	Samuel Igun	Nigeria	A	15.19	X	16.33	16.33	Q
10	John Craft	United States	B	15.78	16.09	16.32	16.32	Q
11	Mikhail Bariban	Soviet Union	A	16.09	16.12	16.26	16.26	Q
12	Bernard Lamitié	France	A	16.24	—	—	16.24	Q
13	Gábor Katona	Hungary	B	16.19	15.43	14.89	16.19	
14	Kosei Gushiken	Japan	B	16.19	X	X	16.19	
15	Gennady Bessonov	Soviet Union	A	16.10	15.95	16.18	16.18	
16	Giuseppe Gentile	Italy	B	15.79	X	16.04	16.04	
17	Esa Rinne	Finland	A	15.49	15.98	15.76	15.98	
18	Václav Fišer	Czechoslovakia	B	15.96	15.75	15.75	15.96	
19	Heinz-Günter Schenk	East Germany	B	15.54	15.91	15.41	15.91	
20	Mick McGrath	Australia	A	15.40	15.90	15.32	15.90	
21	Johnson Amoah	Ghana	A	15.79	15.69	15.84	15.84	
22	Abraham Munabi	Uganda	B	14.74	15.82	X	15.82	
23	Moise Pomaney	Ghana	B	15.72	15.18	15.31	15.72	
24	Pedro Pérez	Cuba	B	15.72	14.85	X	15.72	
25	Milan Spasojević	Yugoslavia	A	15.63	15.69	13.33	15.69	
26	Yukito Muraki	Japan	A	15.53	15.59	X	15.59	
27	Tim Barrett	Bahamas	B	15.51	15.43	X	15.51	
28	Wilfredo Maisonave	Puerto Rico	B	14.07	14.77	15.38	15.38	
29	Art Walker	United States	B	X	15.29	X	15.29	
30	Patrick Onyango	Kenya	B	X	X	14.74	14.74	
31	Chen Ming-Chi	Republic of China	B	X	14.73	14.11	14.73	
32	Dave Smith	United States	A	X	14.55	X	14.55	
33	Ghazi Saleh Marzouk	Saudi Arabia	A	13.82	13.41	13.51	13.82	
34	Martin Matupi	Malawi	A	13.57	X	13.34	13.57	
—	Henry Jackson	Jamaica	A	X	X	X	No mark	
—	Mohinder Singh Gill	India	A	X	X	X	No mark	
—	Martin Adouna	Togo	B	DNS				
—	Christoph Chodaton	Dahomey	B	DNS				

=== Final ===
At the end of three jumps the top eight received another three jumps. The remaining jumpers are eliminated from medal contention.

Rank	Athlete	Nation	1	2	3	4	5	6	Distance
1st place, gold medalist(s)	Viktor Saneyev	Soviet Union	17.35	16.71	17.19	X	16.98	X	17.35
2nd place, silver medalist(s)	Jörg Drehmel	East Germany	X	17.02	X	X	17.31	15.34	17.31
3rd place, bronze medalist(s)	Nelson Prudêncio	Brazil	16.87	16.61	16.35	16.88	X	17.05	17.05
4	Carol Corbu	Romania	16.62	16.85	16.40	X	13.72	X	16.85
5	John Craft	United States	16.77	16.75	16.83	16.26	X	X	16.83
6	Mansour Dia	Senegal	16.77	16.83	X	X	16.15	X	16.83
7	Michał Joachimowski	Poland	16.69	X	14.62	14.98	X	X	16.69
8	Kristen Fløgstad	Norway	X	16.44	X	X	15.97	X	16.44
9	Mikhail Bariban	Soviet Union	X	16.30	15.96	Did not advance			16.30
10	Bernard Lamitié	France	16.22	15.88	16.27	Did not advance			16.27
11	Samuel Igun	Nigeria	X	15.79	16.03	Did not advance			16.03
12	Toshiaki Inoue	Japan	15.88	X	X	Did not advance			15.88
