= 1969 European Athletics Championships – Men's triple jump =

Men's triple jump at the European Athletics Championships

The men's triple jump at the 1969 European Athletics Championships was held in Athens, Greece, at Georgios Karaiskakis Stadium on 16 and 17 September 1969.

== Medalists ==
| Gold | Viktor Saneyev; Soviet Union |
| Silver | Zoltán Cziffra; Hungary |
| Bronze | Klaus Neumann; East Germany |

== Results ==
=== Final ===
17 September

| Rank | Name | Nationality | Result | Notes |
|---|---|---|---|---|
| 1st place, gold medalist(s) | Viktor Saneyev | Soviet Union | 17.34 | |
| 2nd place, silver medalist(s) | Zoltán Cziffra | Hungary | 16.85 | |
| 3rd place, bronze medalist(s) | Klaus Neumann | East Germany | 16.68 | |
| 4 | Carol Corbu | Romania | 16.56 | |
| 5 | Nikolay Dudkin | Soviet Union | 16.46 | |
| 6 | Jörg Drehmel | East Germany | 16.23 | |
| 7 | Giuseppe Gentile | Italy | 16.03 | |
| 8 | Serge Firca | France | 15.94 | |
| 9 | Tony Wadhams | Great Britain | 15.90 | |
| 10 | Henrik Kalocsai | Hungary | 15.79 | |
| 11 | Kristen Fløgstad | Norway | 15.71 | |
| 12 | Georgi Stoykovski | Bulgaria | 15.14 | |

=== Qualification ===
16 September

| Rank | Name | Nationality | Result | Notes |
|---|---|---|---|---|
| 1 | Klaus Neumann | East Germany | 16.78 | CR Q |
| 2 | Carol Corbu | Romania | 16.76 | Q |
| 3 | Viktor Saneyev | Soviet Union | 16.66 | Q |
| 4 | Nikolay Dudkin | Soviet Union | 16.65 | Q |
| 5 | Tony Wadhams | Great Britain | 16.49 | Q |
| 6 | Serge Firca | France | 16.40 | Q |
| 7 | Georgi Stoykovski | Bulgaria | 16.39 | Q |
| 8 | Henrik Kalocsai | Hungary | 16.21 | Q |
| 9 | Zoltán Cziffra | Hungary | 16.15 | Q |
| 10 | Jörg Drehmel | East Germany | 16.15 | Q |
| 11 | Giuseppe Gentile | Italy | 16.11 | Q |
| 12 | Kristen Fløgstad | Norway | 16.04 | Q |
| 13 | Andrzej Lasocki | Poland | 16.00 | |
| 14 | Birger Nyberg | Sweden | 15.85 | |
| 15 | Evangelos Vlasis | Greece | 15.78 | |
| 16 | Raymond Privé | France | 15.52 | |

== Participation ==
According to an unofficial count, 16 athletes from 12 countries participated in the event.

- Bulgaria (1)
- East Germany (2)
- France (2)
- Greece (1)
- Hungary (2)
- Italy (1)
- Norway (1)
- Poland (1)
- Romania (1)
- Soviet Union (2)
- Sweden (1)
- Great Britain (1)
