= Athletics at the 1973 Summer Universiade – Men's triple jump =

The men's triple jump event at the 1973 Summer Universiade was held at the Central Lenin Stadium in Moscow on 18 and 19 August.

== Medalists ==
Gold	Silver	Bronze
Mikhail Bariban; Soviet Union	Viktor Saneyev; Soviet Union	Jörg Drehmel; East Germany

== Results ==
=== Qualification ===
Qualification distance: 15.70 m

Rank	Group	Athlete	Nationality	Result	Notes
1	?	Mikhail Bariban	Soviet Union	16.46	Q
2	?	Jörg Drehmel	East Germany	16.31	Q
3	?	Viktor Saneyev	Soviet Union	16.22	Q
4	?	Pedro Pérez	Cuba	15.97	Q
5	?	Milan Spasojević	Yugoslavia	15.88	Q
6	?	Abraham Munabi	Uganda	15.78	Q
7	?	Barry McClore	United States	15.77	Q
8	?	Andrzej Sontag	Poland	15.73	Q
9	?	Toshiaki Inoue	Japan	15.62	q
10	?	Peter Blackburn	Great Britain	15.58	q
11	?	Gábor Katona	Hungary	15.56	q
12	?	Wilfredo Maisonave	Puerto Rico	15.46	q
13	?	Toni Teuber	Switzerland	15.37	
14	?	Ronaldo Lobato	Brazil	15.22	
15	?	Suresh Babu	India	15.16	
16	?	Jorma Gröhn	Finland	15.08	
17	?	Richard Kick	West Germany	15.03	
18	?	Ali Ehsanollah Parsa	Iran	14.55	
19	?	Moses Oduro	Ghana	14.25	
20	?	Martin Douglas	Costa Rica	14.01	
21	?	Nimal Jayawickrema	Sri Lanka	13.55	

=== Final ===
Rank	Athlete	Nationality	Result	Notes
1st place, gold medalist(s)	Mikhail Bariban	Soviet Union	17.20	
2nd place, silver medalist(s)	Viktor Saneyev	Soviet Union	17.00	
3rd place, bronze medalist(s)	Jörg Drehmel	East Germany	16.76	
4	Andrzej Sontag	Poland	16.57	
5	Barry McClore	United States	16.07	
6	Toshiaki Inoue	Japan	15.91	
7	Gábor Katona	Hungary	15.76	
8	Milan Spasojević	Yugoslavia	15.72	
9	Peter Blackburn	Great Britain	15.47	
10	Abraham Munabi	Uganda	15.29	
11	Wilfredo Maisonave	Puerto Rico	15.06	
	Pedro Pérez	Cuba	DNS	
