= 1966 European Athletics Championships – Men's triple jump =

Men's triple jump at the European Athletics Championships

The men's triple jump at the 1966 European Athletics Championships was held in Budapest, Hungary, at Népstadion on 3 and 4 September 1966.

== Medalists ==
| Gold | Georgi Stoykovski; Bulgaria |
| Silver | Hans-Jürgen Rückborn; East Germany |
| Bronze | Henrik Kalocsai; Hungary |

== Results ==
=== Final ===
4 September

| Rank | Name | Nationality | Result | Notes |
|---|---|---|---|---|
| 1st place, gold medalist(s) | Georgi Stoykovski | Bulgaria | 16.67 | CR NR |
| 2nd place, silver medalist(s) | Hans-Jürgen Rückborn | East Germany | 16.66 | NR |
| 3rd place, bronze medalist(s) | Henrik Kalocsai | Hungary | 16.59 | NR |
| 4 | Jan Jaskólski | Poland | 16.57 | |
| 5 | Józef Szmidt | Poland | 16.45 | |
| 6 | Michael Sauer | West Germany | 16.39 | |
| 7 | Șerban Ciochină | Romania | 16.22 | |
| 8 | Siegfried Dähne | East Germany | 16.17 | |
| 9 | Giuseppe Gentile | Italy | 16.15 | |
| 10 | Petr Nemšovský | Czechoslovakia | 16.14 | |
| 11 | Vladimir Kurkyevich | Soviet Union | 16.00 | |
| 12 | Fred Alsop | Great Britain | 15.93 | |
| 13 | Anatoliy Alyabyev | Soviet Union | 15.77 | |
| 14 | Zoltán Cziffra | Hungary | 15.73 | |
| 15 | Dodyu Patarinski | Bulgaria | 15.65 | |
| 16 | Nikolay Dudkin | Soviet Union | 15.46 | |

=== Qualification ===
3 September

| Rank | Name | Nationality | Result | Notes |
|---|---|---|---|---|
| 1 | Michael Sauer | West Germany | 16.46 | NR Q |
| 2 | Șerban Ciochină | Romania | 16.42 | NR Q |
| 3 | Giuseppe Gentile | Italy | 16.41 | Q |
| 4 | Henrik Kalocsai | Hungary | 16.28 | Q |
| 5 | Hans-Jürgen Rückborn | East Germany | 16.11 | Q |
| 6 | Vladimir Kurkyevich | Soviet Union | 16.11 | Q |
| 7 | Anatoliy Alyabyev | Soviet Union | 16.09 | Q |
| 8 | Petr Nemšovský | Czechoslovakia | 16.07 | Q |
| 9 | Józef Szmidt | Poland | 16.05 | Q |
| 10 | Jan Jaskólski | Poland | 16.00 | Q |
| 11 | Zoltán Cziffra | Hungary | 15.99 | Q |
| 12 | Georgi Stoykovski | Bulgaria | 15.91 | Q |
| 13 | Siegfried Dähne | East Germany | 15.91 | Q |
| 14 | Nikolay Dudkin | Soviet Union | 15.84 | Q |
| 15 | Fred Alsop | Great Britain | 15.83 | Q |
| 16 | Dodyu Patarinski | Bulgaria | 15.82 | Q |
| 17 | Pertti Pousi | Finland | 15.67 | |
| 18 | František Krupala | Czechoslovakia | 15.60 | |
| 19 | Martin Jensen | Norway | 15.58 | |
| 20 | Günther Krivec | West Germany | 15.58 | |
| 21 | Andrzej Puławski | Poland | 15.55 | |
| 22 | Aşkın Tuna | Turkey | 15.53 | |
| 23 | Evangelos Vlassis | Greece | 15.39 | |
| 24 | Dragán Ivanov | Hungary | 15.22 | |

== Participation ==
According to an unofficial count, 24 athletes from 14 countries participated in the event.

- Bulgaria (2)
- Czechoslovakia (2)
- East Germany (2)
- Finland (1)
- Greece (1)
- Hungary (3)
- Italy (1)
- Norway (1)
- Poland (3)
- Romania (1)
- Soviet Union (3)
- Turkey (1)
- Great Britain (1)
- West Germany (2)
