= 1967 European Indoor Games – Men's triple jump =

The men's triple jump event at the 1967 European Indoor Games was held on 11 and 12 March in Prague.

== Medalists ==
Gold	Silver	Bronze
Petr Nemšovský; Czechoslovakia	Henrik Kalocsai; Hungary	Aleksandr Zolotaryov; Soviet Union

== Results ==
=== Qualification ===
Rank	Name	Nationality	#1	#2	#3	Result	Notes
1	Michael Sauer	West Germany	15.68	16.19	16.49	16.49	q
2	Hans-Jürgen Rückborn	East Germany	x	15.70	16.43	16.43	q
3	Petr Nemšovský	Czechoslovakia	15.91	16.35	–	16.35	q
4	Henrik Kalocsai	Hungary	x	16.33	x	16.33	q
5	Vladimir Kurkyevich	Soviet Union	14.63	x	16.29	16.29	q
6	Aleksandr Zolotaryov	Soviet Union	16.04	15.77	15.89	16.04	q
7	Șerban Ciochină	Romania	15.95	15.87	15.96	15.96	
8	Luis Felipe Areta	Spain	15.95	15.87	15.96	15.92	
9	František Krupala	Czechoslovakia	15.24	15.63	x	15.63	
10	Giuseppe Gentile	Italy	x	14.95	15.51	15.51	
11	Klaus Neumann	East Germany	x	x	15.08	15.08	
12	Aşkın Tuna	Turkey	14.92	13.55	15.03	15.03	

=== Final ===
Rank	Name	Nationality	#1	#2	#3	#4	#5	#6	Result	Notes
1st place, gold medalist(s)	Petr Nemšovský	Czechoslovakia	15.90	x	16.19	16.57	x	16.04	16.57	
2nd place, silver medalist(s)	Henrik Kalocsai	Hungary	x	15.87	16.07	16.45	15.83	16.31	16.45	
3rd place, bronze medalist(s)	Aleksandr Zolotaryov	Soviet Union	15.95	16.15	16.32	16.40	15.86	x	16.40	
4	Hans-Jürgen Rückborn	East Germany	x	16.14	16.40	16.31	x	x	16.40	
5	Michael Sauer	West Germany	16.15	15.74	16.08	16.25	16.37	16.28	16.37	
6	Vladimir Kurkyevich	Soviet Union	15.85	x	x	16.09	x	x	16.09	
