= 1966 European Indoor Games – Men's triple jump =

The men's triple jump event at the 1966 European Indoor Games was held on 27 March 1966 in Dortmund.

== Medalists ==
Gold	Silver	Bronze
Șerban Ciochină; Romania	Michael Sauer; West Germany	Petr Nemšovský; Czechoslovakia

== Results ==
=== Qualification ===
Rank	Name	Nationality	#1	#2	#3	Result	Notes
1	Michael Sauer	West Germany	x	15.89	16.05	16.05	q
2	Giuseppe Gentile	Italy	15.86	15.74	15.73	15.86	q
3	Henrik Kalocsai	Hungary	15.50	15.38	15.84	15.84	q
4	Șerban Ciochină	Romania	15.82	x	x	15.82	q
5	Petr Nemšovský	Czechoslovakia	15.50	15.64	15.72	15.72	q
6	Hans-Jürgen Rückborn	East Germany	x	15.64	15.63	15.64	q
7	Martin Jensen	Norway	14.93	14.85	15.43	15.43	q
8	Aşkın Tuna	Turkey	x	15.34	15.24	15.34	q

=== Final ===
Rank	Name	Nationality	#1	#2	#3	#4	#5	#6	Result	Notes
1st place, gold medalist(s)	Șerban Ciochină	Romania	15.92	16.29	16.37	16.43	x	16.20	16.43	
2nd place, silver medalist(s)	Michael Sauer	West Germany	16.24	x	x	x	16.35	x	16.35	
3rd place, bronze medalist(s)	Petr Nemšovský	Czechoslovakia	x	16.28	16.21	16.07	15.73	15.71	16.28	
4	Giuseppe Gentile	Italy	16.17	15.98	15.84	16.25	16.00	16.07	16.25	
5	Hans-Jürgen Rückborn	East Germany	15.47	15.87	14.21	x	x	15.96	15.96	
6	Henrik Kalocsai	Hungary	15.84	x	x	x	x	x	15.84	
