= Athletics at the 1968 Summer Olympics – Men's triple jump =

Men's triple jump at the Games of the XIX Olympiad
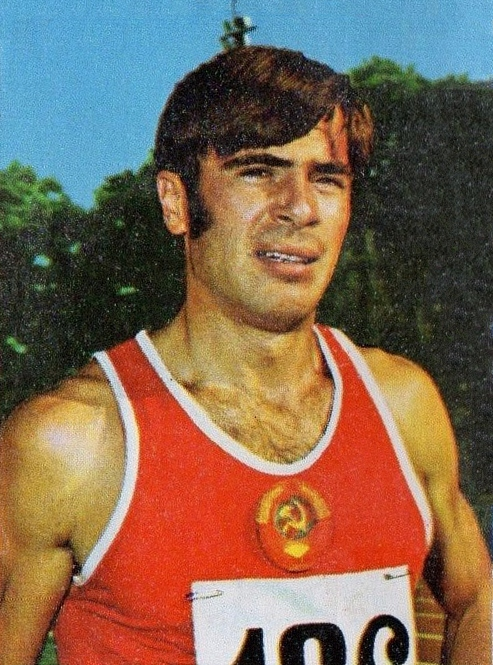
- Viktor Saneyev (1972)
- Venue: Estadio Olímpico Universitario
- Dates: October 16–17, 1968
- Competitors: 34 from 24 nations
- Winning distance: 17.39 WR

Medalists
1st place, gold medalist(s)		Viktor Saneyev; Soviet Union
2nd place, silver medalist(s)		Nelson Prudêncio; Brazil
3rd place, bronze medalist(s)		Giuseppe Gentile; Italy

The men's triple jump competition at the 1968 Summer Olympics in Mexico City, Mexico took place on October 16–17. Thirty-four athletes from 24 nations competed. The maximum number of athletes per nation had been set at 3 since the 1930 Olympic Congress. The event was won by Viktor Saneyev of the Soviet Union, the first time the nation had won gold in the event (though the fifth consecutive Games in which the Soviets had won at least one medal). Saneyev began a decade of dominating the Olympic triple jump; he would win again in 1972 and 1976 as well as taking silver in 1980. Nelson Prudêncio's silver was Brazil's first medal in the event since 1956; Giuseppe Gentile's bronze was Italy's first men's triple jump medal ever.

== Summary ==
With the best athletes jumping at high altitude in the Olympics, the world record was set multiple times. Prior to the event, Józef Szmidt had held the world record for eight years and also held the Olympic record since the previous Olympics.

The world and Olympic record were smashed in the qualifying round by Giuseppe Gentile, with a 17.10 on his second attempt (after fouling the first).

The following day in the final, Gentile improved upon his record in the first round, jumping 17.22. In the third round, Viktor Saneyev improved upon the record by one centimeter. In the fifth round Nelson Prudêncio took the lead and the record. On his last attempt, Saneyev hit the winner and new record of 17.39 m (57 ft 1/2 in).

The record lasted for three years until it was improved upon by Pedro Pérez. One year later, Saneyev brought the record with a 17.44 that lasted 3 years. In 1975 in this same stadium, João Carlos de Oliveira made a .45 m (1 ft 5 1/2 in) "beamonesque" improvement to the record that held for almost 10 years. The record was brought down to sea level by Willie Banks in 1985.

During the competition, five men exceeded the previous world record though Nikolay Dudkin's jumps were wind aided. Phil May and Szmidt jumped further than his Olympic record in sixth and seventh place respectively.

== Background ==
This was the 16th appearance of the event, which is one of 12 athletics events to have been held at every Summer Olympics. Returning finalists from the 1964 Games were gold medalist Józef Szmidt of Poland, bronze medalist Vitold Kreyer of the Soviet Union, fourth-place finisher Ira Davis of the United States, seventh-place finisher Manfred Hinze of the United Team of Germany, ninth-place finisher Ian Tomlinson of Australia, and twelfth-place finisher Fred Alsop of Great Britain. Szmidt had won the European championship again in 1962 and would have been the favorite but for a recent knee surgery that made his ability to repeat questionable.

The Bahamas, Hong Kong, Madagascar, Romania, and Senegal each made their first appearance in the event. The United States competed for the 16th time, having competed at each of the Games so far.

== Competition format ==
The competition consisted of two rounds, qualification and final. In qualification, each athlete jumped three times. At least the top twelve athletes moved on to the final; if more than twelve reached the qualifying distance of 16.10 metres, all who did so advanced. Distances were reset for the final round. Finalists jumped three times, after which the eight best jumped three more times (with the best distance of the six jumps counted).

== Records ==
Prior to the competition, the existing World and Olympic records were as follows.

World record	Józef Szmidt (POL)	17.03	Olsztyn, Poland	5 August 1960
Olympic record	Józef Szmidt (POL)	16.85	Tokyo, Japan	16 October 1964

The following new world and Olympic records were set during this competition.

Date	Event	Athlete	Time	OR	WR
16 October	Qualifying	Giuseppe Gentile (ITA)	17.10 m (56 ft 1 in)	OR	WR
17 October	Final	Giuseppe Gentile (ITA)	17.22 m (56 ft 5 3/4 in)	OR	WR
17 October	Final	Viktor Saneyev (URS)	17.23 m (56 ft 6 1/4 in)	OR	WR
17 October	Final	Nélson Prudêncio (BRA)	17.27 m (56 ft 7 3/4 in)	OR	WR
17 October	Final	Viktor Saneyev (URS)	17.39 m (57 ft 1/2 in)	OR	WR

== Schedule ==
All times are Central Standard Time (UTC-6)

Date	Time	Round
Wednesday, 16 October 1968	10:00	Qualifying
Thursday, 17 October 1968	15:00	Final

== Results ==
=== Qualifying ===
Qual. rule: qualification standard 16.10m (Q) or at least best 12 qualified (q).

Rank	Group	Athlete	Nation	1	2	3	Distance	Notes
1	A	Giuseppe Gentile	Italy	X	17.10 WR	—	17.10	Q, WR
2	B	Mansour Dia	Senegal	16.58	—	—	16.58	Q
3	B	Art Walker	United States	16.49	—	—	16.49	Q
4	B	Nelson Prudêncio	Brazil	15.79	16.46	—	16.46	Q
5	A	Phil May	Australia	16.32	—	—	16.32	Q
6	B	Georgi Stoykovski	Bulgaria	15.26	X	16.24	16.24	Q
7	B	Viktor Saneyev	Soviet Union	16.22	—	—	16.22	Q
8	A	Şerban Ciochină	Romania	15.93	16.07	16.21	16.21	Q
9	B	Luis Felipe Areta	Spain	15.94	16.20	—	16.20	Q
10	B	Joachim Kugler	West Germany	15.79	16.20	—	16.20	Q
11	A	Józef Szmidt	Poland	X	16.19	—	16.19	Q
12	B	Henrik Kalocsai	Hungary	15.44	16.16	—	16.16	Q
13	B	Nikolay Dudkin	Soviet Union	15.81	16.15	—	16.15	Q
14	B	Jan Jaskólski	Poland	15.79	16.04	—	16.04	
15	A	Michael Sauer	West Germany	15.61	16.02	15.84	16.02	
16	A	Derek Boosey	Great Britain	15.07	15.99	16.01	16.01	
17	A	Norman Tate	United States	13.43	15.84	15.83	15.84	
18	B	Pertti Pousi	Finland	X	15.84	15.74	15.84	
19	A	Yukito Muraki	Japan	X	15.37	15.83	15.83	
20	A	Tim Barrett	Bahamas	X	15.06	15.79	15.79	
21	A	Dave Smith	United States	X	X	15.75	15.75	
22	A	Evangelos Vlasis	Greece	15.47	15.52	15.71	15.71	
23	B	Fred Alsop	Great Britain	12.93	15.71	15.50	15.71	
24	B	Johnson Amoah	Ghana	15.65	15.28	15.65	15.65	
25	B	Aşkın Tuna	Turkey	15.65	X	15.43	15.65	
26	B	Heinz-Günter Schenk	East Germany	X	14.72	15.61	15.61	
27	B	Dragán Ivanov	Hungary	15.61	X	14.42	15.61	
28	A	Samuel Igun	Nigeria	15.40	13.86	15.46	15.46	
29	A	Aleksandr Zolotarev	Soviet Union	15.41	14.72	X	15.41	
30	B	Lennox Burgher	Jamaica	15.20	15.29	15.14	15.29	
31	A	Chen Ming-Chi	Taiwan	15.29	15.04	14.76	15.29	
32	A	Klaus Neumann	East Germany	15.16	X	—	15.16	
33	B	Héctor Serrate	Puerto Rico	15.09	15.05	14.89	15.09	
34	A	Zoltán Cziffra	Hungary	15.04	X	—	15.04	
—	A	Labh Singh	India	DNS				

=== Final ===
Rank	Athlete	Nation	1	2	3	4	5	6	Distance	Notes
1st place, gold medalist(s)	Viktor Saneyev	Soviet Union	16.49	16.84	17.23 WR	17.02	16.81	17.39 WR	17.39	WR
2nd place, silver medalist(s)	Nelson Prudêncio	Brazil	16.33	17.05	16.75	X	17.27 WR	17.15	17.27	AR
3rd place, bronze medalist(s)	Giuseppe Gentile	Italy	17.22 WR	X	X	X	16.54	X	17.22	AR
4	Art Walker	United States	15.43	16.45	16.77	16.48	X	17.12	17.12	AR
5	Nikolay Dudkin	Soviet Union	16.15	16.70	16.37	16.73	17.09	16.53	17.09	NR
6	Phil May	Australia	15.48	16.58	16.51	17.02	X	–	17.02	AR
7	Józef Szmidt	Poland	16.06	16.77	X	16.66	X	16.89	16.89	
8	Mansour Dia	Senegal	16.71	16.48	15.44	16.73	16.64	15.83	16.73	
9	Georgi Stoykovski	Bulgaria	16.28	16.46	16.19	Did not advance			16.46	
10	Henrik Kalocsai	Hungary	16.45	16.39	16.20	Did not advance			16.45	
11	Joachim Kugler	West Germany	12.87	X	15.90	Did not advance			15.90	
12	Luis Felipe Areta	Spain	15.72	15.75	14.80	Did not advance			15.75	
13	Şerban Ciochină	Romania	X	X	15.62	Did not advance			15.62	
