= 1971 European Athletics Championships – Men's triple jump =

Men's triple jump at the European Athletics Championships

The men's triple jump at the 1971 European Athletics Championships was held in Helsinki, Finland, at Helsinki Olympic Stadium on 14 and 15 August 1971.

== Medalists ==
Gold	Jörg Drehmel; East Germany
Silver	Viktor Sanejev; Soviet Union
Bronze	Carol Corbu; Romania

== Results ==
=== Final ===
15 August

Rank	Name	Nationality	Result	Notes
1st place, gold medalist(s)	Jörg Drehmel	East Germany	17.16 w (w: 3.7 m/s)	
2nd place, silver medalist(s)	Viktor Sanejev	Soviet Union	17.10 w (w: 3 m/s)	
3rd place, bronze medalist(s)	Carol Corbu	Romania	16.87	
4	Michael Sauer	West Germany	16.58 (w: 1 m/s)	
5	Václav Fišer	Czechoslovakia	16.39 w (w: 2.9 m/s)	
6	Heinz-Günter Schenk	East Germany	16.38 w (w: 2.2 m/s)	
7	Gennady Bessonov	Soviet Union	16.26 (w: 1.8 m/s)	
8	Gennady Salevich	Soviet Union	16.24 w (w: 3.2 m/s)	
9	Joachim Kugler	West Germany	16.12 (w: 0.9 m/s)	
10	Luis Felipe Areta	Spain	15.81 w (w: 2.8 m/s)	
11	Józef Szmidt	Poland	15.62 (w: 1.1 m/s)	
12	Giuseppe Gentile	Italy	14.00	

=== Qualification ===
14 August

Rank	Name	Nationality	Result	Notes
1	Viktor Sanejev	Soviet Union	16.99	Q
2	Jörg Drehmel	East Germany	16.83	Q
3	Michael Sauer	West Germany	16.50	Q
4	Joachim Kugler	West Germany	16.47	Q
5	Giuseppe Gentile	Italy	16.46	Q
6	Luis Felipe Areta	Spain	16.41	Q
7	Václav Fišer	Czechoslovakia	16.32	Q
8	Józef Szmidt	Poland	16.27	Q
9	Heinz-Günter Schenk	East Germany	16.23	Q
10	Gennady Bessonov	Soviet Union	16.19	q
11	Carol Corbu	Romania	16.12	q
12	Gennady Salevich	Soviet Union	16.10	q
13	Kristen Fløgstad	Norway	15.93	
14	Pentti Kuukasjärvi	Finland	15.83	
15	Serge Firca	France	15.79	
16	Milan Spasojević	Yugoslavia	15.61	
17	Henrik Kalocsai	Hungary	15.56	
18	Aşkın Tuna	Turkey	15.39	

== Participation ==
According to an unofficial count, 18 athletes from 14 countries participated in the event.

- Czechoslovakia (1)
- East Germany (2)
- Finland (1)
- France (1)
- Hungary (1)
- Italy (1)
- Norway (1)
- Poland (1)
- Romania (1)
- Soviet Union (3)
- Spain (1)
- Turkey (1)
- West Germany (2)
- Yugoslavia (1)
