= Athletics at the 1965 Summer Universiade – Men's triple jump =

The men's triple jump event at the 1965 Summer Universiade was held at the People's Stadium in Budapest on 28 and 29 August 1965.

The winning margin was 1 cm which as of 2024 remains the only time the men's triple jump was won by less than 2 cm at these games.

== Medalists ==
Gold	Silver	Bronze
Henrik Kalocsai; Hungary	Dragán Ivanov; Hungary	Michael Sauer; West Germany

== Results ==
=== Qualification ===
Rank	Group	Name	Nationality	Result	Notes
1	?	Giuseppe Gentile	Italy	15.65	Q
2	?	Aleksandr Zolotaryev	Soviet Union	15.44	Q
3	?	Luis Felipe Areta	Spain	15.42	Q
4	?	Michael Sauer	West Germany	15.28	Q
4	?	Dragán Ivanov	Hungary	15.28	Q
6	?	Art Walker	United States	15.26	Q
7	?	Satoshi Shimo	Japan	15.18	Q
8	?	Henrik Kalocsai	Hungary	15.17	Q
9	?	Georgi Stoykovski	Bulgaria	15.13	Q
10	?	Hidetsugu Nanasawa	Japan	14.84	Q
11	?	Aşkın Tuna	Turkey	14.79	Q
12	?	Aleksandr Lazarenko	Soviet Union	14.74	Q
13	?	Andrzej Plenkiewicz	Poland	14.73	Q
14	?	Jean-Marie Bouchet	France	14.41	

=== Final ===
Rank	Name	Nationality	#1	#2	#3	#4	#5	#6	Result	Notes
1st place, gold medalist(s)	Henrik Kalocsai	Hungary							16.36	
2nd place, silver medalist(s)	Dragán Ivanov	Hungary							16.35	
3rd place, bronze medalist(s)	Michael Sauer	West Germany							16.35	
4	Giuseppe Gentile	Italy	15.26	16.31	13.73	15.62	x	16.00	16.31	NR
5	Georgi Stoykovski	Bulgaria							16.29	
6	Aleksandr Zolotaryev	Soviet Union							16.27	
7	Aleksandr Lazarenko	Soviet Union							16.15	
8	Art Walker	United States							16.15	
9	Luis Felipe Areta	Spain							16.01	
10	Satoshi Shimo	Japan							15.34	
11	Aşkın Tuna	Turkey							15.16	
12	Hidetsugu Nanasawa	Japan							15.15	
13	Andrzej Plenkiewicz	Poland							12.39	
