= Athletics at the 1967 Summer Universiade – Men's long jump =

The men's long jump event at the 1967 Summer Universiade was held at the National Olympic Stadium in Tokyo on 4 September 1967.

== Results ==
Rank	Name	Nationality	Result	Notes
1st place, gold medalist(s)	Naoki Abe	Japan	7.71	
2nd place, silver medalist(s)	Graham Taylor	Australia	7.65	
3rd place, bronze medalist(s)	Pertti Pousi	Finland	7.55	
4	Peter Reed	Great Britain	7.51	
5	Shinji Ogura	Japan	7.48	
6	Giuseppe Gentile	Italy	7.31	
7	Michael Sauer	West Germany	7.25	
8	Günter Krivec	Germany	7.17	
