= Athletics at the 1967 Summer Universiade – Men's triple jump =

The men's triple jump event at the 1967 Summer Universiade was held at the National Olympic Stadium in Tokyo on 4 September 1967.

== Results ==
Rank	Name	Nationality	Result	Notes
1st place, gold medalist(s)	Michael Sauer	West Germany	16.07	
2nd place, silver medalist(s)	Pertti Pousi	Finland	15.94	
3rd place, bronze medalist(s)	Giuseppe Gentile	Italy	15.84	
4	Charles Craig	United States	15.63	
5	Yukito Muraki	Japan	15.62	
6	Kosei Gushiken	Japan	15.57	
7	Mohinder Singh Gill	India	15.31	
8	Bill Greenough	Canada	15.21	
9	Derek Boosey	Great Britain	15.15	
