= 1972 European Athletics Indoor Championships – Men's triple jump =

The men's triple jump event at the 1972 European Athletics Indoor Championships was held on 11 March in Grenoble.

== Results ==
Rank	Name	Nationality	#1	#2	#3	#4	#5	#6	Result	Notes
1st place, gold medalist(s)	Viktor Saneyev	Soviet Union	16.80	16.87	x	16.47	16.97	16.96	16.97	WB
2nd place, silver medalist(s)	Carol Corbu	Romania	16.40	16.72	16.73	16.25	16.89	16.76	16.89	
3rd place, bronze medalist(s)	Valentyn Shevchenko	Soviet Union	15.83	16.31	15.78	16.34	16.73		16.73	
4	Gennadiy Bessonov	Soviet Union	16.34	15.73	16.55	16.30	16.56	16.58	16.58	
5	Milan Spasojević	Yugoslavia	x	16.22	16.29	15.87	x	x	16.29	
6	Michael Sauer	West Germany	16.15	16.27	15.92	15.81	15.96	15.82	16.27	
7	Bernard Lamitié	France	16.03	15.68	16.26	x	x	x	16.26	
8	Michał Joachimowski	Poland	x	x	16.21	x	16.11	x	16.21	
9	Andrzej Lasocki	Poland	15.57	15.86	x				15.86	
10	Václav Fišer	Czechoslovakia	15.40	x	15.64				15.64	
11	Eugeniusz Biskupski	Poland	x	x	15.38				15.38	
