= 1971 European Athletics Indoor Championships – Men's triple jump =

The men's triple jump event at the 1971 European Athletics Indoor Championships was held on 14 March in Sofia.

== Results ==
Rank	Name	Nationality	#1	#2	#3	#4	#5	#6	Result	Notes
1st place, gold medalist(s)	Viktor Saneyev	Soviet Union	16.55	16.83	16.58	16.63	16.40	16.75	16.83	
2nd place, silver medalist(s)	Carol Corbu	Romania	16.38	16.54	16.43	16.47	16.83	16.42	16.83	NR
3rd place, bronze medalist(s)	Gennadiy Savlevich	Soviet Union	15.78	16.24	15.94	x	15.96	x	16.24	
4	Vasi Dumitrescu	Romania	16.16	15.85	15.87	x	x	x	16.16	
5	Luis Felipe Areta	Spain	15.93	15.76	16.05	16.07	16.11	x	16.11	
6	Zoltán Cziffra	Hungary	15.50	15.52	15.88	15.94	15.91	16.02	16.02	
7	Georgi Stoykovski	Bulgaria	15.73	x	16.00	x	x	x	16.00	
8	Michael Sauer	West Germany	15.79	15.61	15.61	15.94	15.73	15.54	15.94	
9	Harald Strutz	West Germany	15.63	15.79	15.79	15.52	15.75	15.60	15.79	
10	Șerban Ciochină	Romania	15.35	15.74	15.68				15.74	
11	Valentyn Shevchenko	Soviet Union	15.62	15.71	14.69				15.71	
12	Jörg Drehmel	East Germany	13.93	15.35	15.53				15.53	
13	Henrik Kalocsai	Hungary	x	13.72	15.50				15.50	
14	Jan Broda	Czechoslovakia	15.35	15.28	x				15.35	
15	Aşkın Tuna	Turkey	14.97	x	x				14.97	
