= 1968 European Indoor Games – Men's triple jump =

The men's triple jump event at the 1968 European Indoor Games was held on 10 March in Madrid.

== Results ==
Rank	Name	Nationality	#1	#2	#3	#4	#5	#6	Result	Notes
1st place, gold medalist(s)	Nikolay Dudkin	Soviet Union	16.07	16.21	16.71	16.43	16.52	x	16.71	
2nd place, silver medalist(s)	Viktor Saneyev	Soviet Union	16.40	16.38	16.33	16.61	16.35	16.69	16.69	
3rd place, bronze medalist(s)	Luis Felipe Areta	Spain	16.27	16.47	16.38	x	x	x	16.47	
4	Șerban Ciochină	Romania	16.42	x	x	x	x	x	16.42	
5	Giuseppe Gentile	Italy	16.02	x	x	15.98	16.03	x	16.03	
6	Petr Nemšovský	Czechoslovakia	15.64	14.62	15.61	15.56	15.37	x	15.64	
7	Michael Sauer	West Germany							15.61	
8	Aşkın Tuna	Turkey							15.48	
