= 1974 European Athletics Championships – Men's triple jump =

Men's triple jump at the European Athletics Championships

The men's triple jump at the 1974 European Athletics Championships was held in Rome, Italy, at Stadio Olimpico on 8 September 1974.

== Medalists ==
Gold	Viktor Sanejev; Soviet Union
Silver	Carol Corbu; Romania
Bronze	Andrzej Sontag; Poland

== Results ==
=== Final ===
8 September

Rank	Name	Nationality	Result	Notes
1st place, gold medalist(s)	Viktor Sanejev	Soviet Union	17.23	CR
2nd place, silver medalist(s)	Carol Corbu	Romania	16.68	
3rd place, bronze medalist(s)	Andrzej Sontag	Poland	16.61	
4	Jörg Drehmel	East Germany	16.54	
5	Michał Joachimowski	Poland	16.53	
6	Lothar Gora	East Germany	16.42	
7	Jiří Vyčichlo	Czechoslovakia	16.37	
8	Nikolay Sinichkin	Soviet Union	16.17	
9	Pentti Kuukasjärvi	Finland	16.12	
10	Apostolos Kathiniotis	Greece	15.99	
11	Ryszard Garnys	Poland	15.97	
12	Mikhail Segal	Soviet Union	15.89	
13	Bernard Lamitié	France	15.83	
14	Kristen Fløgstad	Norway	15.07	
15	Ezio Buzzelli	Italy	12.84	

== Participation ==
According to an unofficial count, 15 athletes from 10 countries participated in the event.

- Czechoslovakia (1)
- East Germany (2)
- Finland (1)
- France (1)
- Greece (1)
- Italy (1)
- Norway (1)
- Poland (3)
- Romania (1)
- Soviet Union (3)
