= 1974 European Athletics Indoor Championships – Men's triple jump =

The men's triple jump event at the 1974 European Athletics Indoor Championships was held on 10 March in Gothenburg.

== Results ==
Rank	Name	Nationality	Result	Notes
1st place, gold medalist(s)	Michał Joachimowski	Poland	17.03	WB
2nd place, silver medalist(s)	Mikhail Bariban	Soviet Union	16.88	
3rd place, bronze medalist(s)	Bernard Lamitié	France	16.56	
4	Ryszard Garnys	Poland	16.51	
5	Jörg Drehmel	East Germany	16.48	
6	Richard Kick	West Germany	15.85	
7	Christian Valétudie	France	15.71	
8	Mariano Pérez	Spain	15.68	
9	Apostolos Kathiniotis	Greece	15.66	
10	Viktor Saneyev	Soviet Union	15.34	
