= 1969 European Indoor Games – Men's triple jump =

The men's triple jump event at the 1969 European Indoor Games was held on 9 March in Belgrade.

== Results ==
Rank	Name	Nationality	Result	Notes
1st place, gold medalist(s)	Nikolay Dudkin	Soviet Union	16.73	
2nd place, silver medalist(s)	Zoltán Cziffra	Hungary	16.46	
3rd place, bronze medalist(s)	Carol Corbu	Romania	16.20	
4	Michael Sauer	West Germany	15.86	
5	Dragán Ivanov	Hungary	15.79	
6	Derek Boosey	Great Britain	15.63	
7	Adam Adamek	Poland	15.60	
8	Jan Broda	Czechoslovakia	15.48	
9	Dušan Košutić	Yugoslavia	14.81	
