= Athletics at the 1964 Summer Olympics – Men's triple jump =

Men's triple jump at the Games of the XVIII Olympiad
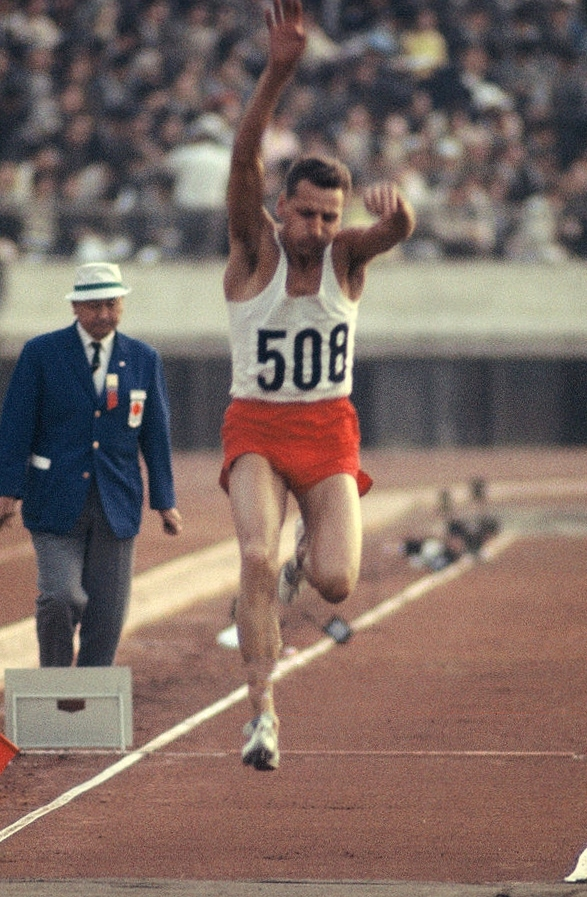
- Józef Szmidt
- Venue: Olympic Stadium
- Date: 16 October 1964
- Competitors: 34 from 21 nations
- Winning distance: 16.85 OR

Medalists
1st place, gold medalist(s)		Józef Szmidt; Poland
2nd place, silver medalist(s)		Oleg Fyodoseyev; Soviet Union
3rd place, bronze medalist(s)		Victor Kravchenko; Soviet Union

Official Video Highlights @50:50 Video on YouTube

The men's triple jump was one of four men's jumping events on the Athletics at the 1964 Summer Olympics program in Tokyo. It was held on 16 October 1964. 36 athletes from 23 nations entered, with 2 not starting in the qualification round. The maximum number of athletes per nation had been set at 3 since the 1930 Olympic Congress. The event was won by Józef Szmidt of Poland, the third man to repeat as Olympic champion in the triple jump. Just as in 1960, the Soviet Union took silver and bronze behind Szmidt.

== Background ==
This was the 15th appearance of the event, which is one of 12 athletics events to have been held at every Summer Olympics. Returning finalists from the 1960 Games were gold medalist Józef Szmidt of Poland, bronze medalist Vitold Kreyer of the Soviet Union, fourth-place finisher Ira Davis of the United States, seventh-place finisher Manfred Hinze of the United Team of Germany, ninth-place finisher Ian Tomlinson of Australia, and twelfth-place finisher Fred Alsop of Great Britain. Szmidt had won the European championship again in 1962 and would have been the favorite but for a recent knee surgery that made his ability to repeat questionable.

The Bahamas, Hong Kong, Madagascar, Romania, and Senegal each made their first appearance in the event. The United States competed for the 15th time, having competed at each of the Games so far.

== Competition format ==
The competition used the two-round format introduced in 1936. In the qualifying round, each jumper received three attempts to reach the qualifying distance of 15.80 metres; if fewer than 12 men did so, the top 12 (including all those tied) would advance. In the final round, each athlete had three jumps; the top six received an additional three jumps, with the best of the six to count.

== Records ==
These are the standing world and Olympic records (in metres) prior to the 1964 Summer Olympics.

World record	Józef Szmidt (POL)	17.03	Olsztyn, Poland	5 August 1960
Olympic record	Józef Szmidt (POL)	16.81	Rome, Italy	6 September 1960

Józef Szmidt set a new Olympic record with 16.85 metres.

== Schedule ==
All times are Japan Standard Time (UTC+9)

Date	Time	Round
Friday, 16 October 1964	10:30; 14:30	Qualifying; Final

== Results ==
=== Qualifying ===
The qualification standard was 15.80 metres with a minimum of 12 jumpers advancing. Each jumper had three opportunities. 13 met or exceeded the standard, advancing to the next round.

Rank	Athlete	Nation	1	2	3	Distance	Notes
1	Fred Alsop	Great Britain	X	15.21	16.41	16.41	Q
2	Ira Davis	United States	16.29	—	—	16.29	Q
3	Manfred Hinze	United Team of Germany	14.10	15.47	16.23	16.23	Q
4	Georgi Stoykovski	Bulgaria	16.21	—	—	16.21	Q
5	Józef Szmidt	Poland	16.18	—	—	16.18	Q
6	Jan Jaskólski	Poland	16.10	—	—	16.10	Q
7	Takayuki Okazaki	Japan	15.76	15.47	16.05	16.05	Q
8	Hans-Jürgen Rückborn	United Team of Germany	15.88	—	—	15.88	Q
9	Oleg Fyodoseyev	Soviet Union	15.87	—	—	15.87	Q
10	Mansour Dia	Senegal	15.64	15.84	—	15.84	Q
11	Şerban Ciochină	Romania	15.81	—	—	15.81	Q
11	Victor Kravchenko	Soviet Union	15.81	—	—	15.81	Q
13	Bill Sharpe	United States	15.80	—	—	15.80	Q
14	Günter Krivec	United Team of Germany	X	15.78	15.78	15.78	
15	Ian Tomlinson	Australia	15.09	15.76	15.34	15.76	
16	Vitold Kreyer	Soviet Union	15.71	15.57	15.69	15.71	
17	Koji Sakurai	Japan	15.42	15.59	15.45	15.59	
18	Michael Ralph	Great Britain	15.09	13.98	15.57	15.57	
19	Henrik Kalocsai	Hungary	X	15.53	15.15	15.53	
20	Luis Felipe Areta	Spain	15.41	X	X	15.41	
21	Kent Floerke	United States	15.36	X	15.33	15.36	
22	George Ogan	Nigeria	X	15.35	15.28	15.35	
23	Aşkın Tuna	Turkey	15.08	15.21	X	15.21	
24	Christian Ohiri	Nigeria	14.35	15.08	15.00	15.08	
25	Éric Battista	France	15.04	X	X	15.04	
26	Labh Singh	India	14.95	X	14.74	14.95	
27	Lyuben Gurgushinov	Bulgaria	14.75	X	X	14.75	
28	Marc Rabémila	Madagascar	14.15	14.62	13.92	14.62	
29	Hartley Saunders	Bahamas	14.59	13.75	14.58	14.59	
30	Hwang Jeong-dae	South Korea	X	X	13.98	13.98	
31	Samir Vincent	Iraq	X	X	13.85	13.85	
32	Chu Ming	Hong Kong	13.25	X	13.50	13.50	
33	Graham Boase	Australia	X	X	X	No mark	
33	Tomio Ota	Japan	X	X	X	No mark	
—	Cha Won-Sil	North Korea	DNS				
—	C. Mousiadis	Greece	DNS				

=== Final ===
The qualification jumps were ignored, each jumper starting with a clean slate in the final. Each jumper jumped three times; the six who had jumped the furthest received another three attempts.

Rank	Athlete	Nation	1	2	3	4	5	6	Distance	Notes
1st place, gold medalist(s)	Józef Szmidt	Poland	16.37	16.65	16.58	X	14.55	16.85 OR	16.85	OR
2nd place, silver medalist(s)	Oleg Fedoseyev	Soviet Union	15.73	15.67	16.35	16.20	16.58	16.38	16.58	
3rd place, bronze medalist(s)	Victor Kravchenko	Soviet Union	16.14	16.38	16.17	16.57	16.10	15.99	16.57	
4	Fred Alsop	Great Britain	16.46	X	16.14	X	X	16.14	16.46	
5	Șerban Ciochină	Romania	15.79	16.23	15.70	16.10	15.79	15.77	16.23	
6	Manfred Hinze	United Team of Germany	15.81	16.06	16.15	X	13.63	X	16.15	
7	Georgi Stoykovski	Bulgaria	15.30	15.96	16.10	Did not advance			16.10	
8	Hans-Jürgen Rückborn	United Team of Germany	16.09	X	15.52	Did not advance			16.09	
9	Ira Davis	United States	15.97	15.82	16.00	Did not advance			16.00	
10	Takayuki Okazaki	Japan	15.69	X	15.90	Did not advance			15.90	
11	William Sharpe	United States	15.84	15.69	15.67	Did not advance			15.84	
12	Jan Jaskólski	Poland	15.82	X	X	Did not advance			15.82	
13	Mansour Dia	Senegal	15.40	X	15.44	Did not advance			15.44	
