= 1973 European Athletics Indoor Championships – Men's triple jump =

The men's triple jump event at the 1973 European Athletics Indoor Championships was held on 10 March in Rotterdam.

== Results ==
Rank	Name	Nationality	Result	Notes
1st place, gold medalist(s)	Carol Corbu	Romania	16.80	
2nd place, silver medalist(s)	Michał Joachimowski	Poland	16.75	
3rd place, bronze medalist(s)	Mikhail Bariban	Soviet Union	16.38	
4	André Rota	France	16.21	
5	Kristen Fløgstad	Norway	16.14	
6	Nikolay Dudkin	Soviet Union	16.09	
7	Richard Kick	West Germany	16.01	
8	Bernard Lamitié	France	15.96	
9	Joachim Kugler	West Germany	15.90	
10	Milan Spasojević	Yugoslavia	15.63	
11	Esa Rinne	Finland	15.25	
