= 1970 European Athletics Indoor Championships – Men's triple jump =

The men's triple jump event at the 1970 European Athletics Indoor Championships was held on 15 March in Vienna.

== Results ==
Rank	Name	Nationality	Result	Notes
1st place, gold medalist(s)	Viktor Sanejev	Soviet Union	16.95	WB
2nd place, silver medalist(s)	Jörg Drehmel	East Germany	16.74	
3rd place, bronze medalist(s)	Șerban Ciochină	Romania	16.47	
4	Michael Sauer	West Germany	16.39	
5	Zoltán Cziffra	Hungary	16.35	
6	Carol Corbu	Romania	16.35	
7	Giuseppe Gentile	Italy	16.12	
8	Serge Firca	France	16.01	
9	Nikolay Dudkin	Soviet Union	15.99	
10	Jan Broda	Czechoslovakia	15.89	
11	Tony Wadhams	Great Britain	15.67	
