= 1976 European Athletics Indoor Championships – Men's triple jump =

The men's triple jump event at the 1976 European Athletics Indoor Championships was held on 22 February in Munich.

== Results ==
Rank	Name	Nationality	Result	Notes
1st place, gold medalist(s)	Viktor Saneyev	Soviet Union	17.10	CR
2nd place, silver medalist(s)	Carol Corbu	Romania	16.75	
3rd place, bronze medalist(s)	Bernard Lamitié	France	16.68	
4	Wolfgang Kolmsee	West Germany	16.47	
5	Pentti Kuukasjärvi	Finland	16.44	NR
6	Pavel Sasín	Czechoslovakia	16.36	
7	Christian Valétudie	France	16.30	
8	Andrzej Sontag	Poland	16.16	
9	Eugeniusz Biskupski	Poland	16.16	
