= Victor Kravchenko =

Victor Kravchenko may refer to:

- Victor Kravchenko (defector) (1905–1966), Soviet defector
- Viktor Kravchenko (athlete) (1941–2026), Soviet athlete
