= Athletics at the 1975 Summer Universiade – Men's triple jump =

The men's triple jump event at the 1975 Summer Universiade was held at the Stadio Olimpico in Rome with the final on 20 September.

== Medalists ==
Gold	Silver	Bronze
Michał Joachimowski; Poland	Anatoliy Piskulin; Soviet Union	Sergey Sidorenko; Soviet Union

== Results ==
=== Qualification ===
Rank	Athlete	Nationality	Time	Notes
1	Michał Joachimowski	Poland	16.09	
2	Hironobu Kobayashi	Japan	15.90	
3	Sergey Sidorenko	Soviet Union	15.77	
4	Ludwig Franz	West Germany	15.74	
5	Maurizio Siega	Italy	15.70	
6	Andrzej Sontag	Poland	15.67	
7	Seigha Porbeni	Nigeria	15.66	
8	Anatoliy Piskulin	Soviet Union	15.64	
9	Miloš Srejović	Yugoslavia	15.61	
10	Milan Spasojević	Yugoslavia	15.59	
11	Dave Watt	Canada	15.54	
12	Robert Le Goupil	France	15.53	
13	Ali Ehsanollah Parsa	Iran	15.11	
14	Ruggero Consorte	Italy	14.82	

=== Final ===
Rank	Athlete	Nationality	Result	Notes
1st place, gold medalist(s)	Michał Joachimowski	Poland	16.54	
2nd place, silver medalist(s)	Anatoliy Piskulin	Soviet Union	16.52	
3rd place, bronze medalist(s)	Sergey Sidorenko	Soviet Union	16.42	
4	Hironobu Kobayashi	Japan	16.38	
5	Andrzej Sontag	Poland	16.29	
6	Milan Spasojević	Yugoslavia	16.28	
7	Maurizio Siega	Italy	15.87	
8	Seigha Porbeni	Nigeria	15.71	
9	Miloš Srejović	Yugoslavia	15.68	
10	Ludwig Franz	West Germany	15.61	
11	Robert Le Goupil	France	15.58	
12	Dave Watt	Canada	15.44	
