= 1975 European Athletics Indoor Championships – Men's triple jump =

The men's triple jump event at the 1975 European Athletics Indoor Championships was held on 8 March in Katowice.

== Results ==
Rank	Name	Nationality	#1	#2	#3	#4	#5	#6	Result	Notes
1st place, gold medalist(s)	Viktor Saneyev	Soviet Union	16.60	x	x	16.59	16.79	17.01	17.01	
2nd place, silver medalist(s)	Michał Joachimowski	Poland	16.38	x	15.35	16.54	16.80	16.90	16.90	
3rd place, bronze medalist(s)	Gennadiy Bessonov	Soviet Union	16.53	16.44	x	x	16.78	16.39	16.78	
4	Carol Corbu	Romania							16.66	
5	Valentyn Shevchenko	Soviet Union							16.60	
6	Eugeniusz Biskupski	Poland							16.56	
7	Christian Valétudie	France							16.31	
8	Wolfgang Kolmsee	West Germany							16.14	
9	Jiří Vyčichlo	Czechoslovakia							15.74	
10	Wojciech Spychalski	Poland							15.69	
11	Jean-Hervé Stièvenart	France							15.58	
