= Krivec =

Krivec is a surname. Notable people with the surname include:

- Günter Krivec (born 1942), German athlete
- Ivana Posavec Krivec (born 1975), Croatian politician
- Jana Krivec (born 1980), Slovene chess player
