= Eardley =

Eardley may refer to:

- Eardley (name), with a list of people of this name
- Eardley, Quebec, Canada, a community in the municipality of Pontiac
- Eardley baronets, a title in the Baronetage of the United Kingdom
