= Athletics at the 1965 Summer Universiade – Men's long jump =

The men's long jump event at the 1965 Summer Universiade was held at the People's Stadium in Budapest on 27 and 28 August 1965.

== Medalists ==
Gold	Silver	Bronze
Igor Ter-Ovanesyan; Soviet Union	Lynn Davies; Great Britain	Oleg Aleksandrov; Soviet Union

== Results ==
=== Qualification ===
Qualification mark: 7.00 metres

Rank	Group	Name	Nationality	Result	Notes
1	?	Lynn Davies	Great Britain	7.71	Q
2	?	Igor Ter-Ovanesyan	Soviet Union	7.49	Q
3	?	Oleg Aleksandrov	Soviet Union	7.31	Q
4	?	Ignacio Martínez	Spain	7.28	Q
4	?	Peter Reed	Great Britain	7.28	Q
4	?	Andrzej Plenkiewicz	Poland	7.28	Q
7	?	Michel Vergès	France	7.27	Q
8	?	Walter Zuberbühler	Switzerland	7.26	Q
9	?	Béla Margitics	Hungary	7.25	Q
10	?	Aleksandar Genchev	Bulgaria	7.24	Q
11	?	Michael Sauer	West Germany	7.22	Q
12	?	Naoki Abe	Japan	7.13	Q
13	?	Adrian Samungi	Romania	7.11	Q
14	?	Shinji Ogura	Japan	7.07	Q
14	?	Miroslav Hutter	Czechoslovakia	7.07	Q
16	?	Abelardo Pacheco	Cuba	7.06	Q
17	?	Volker Grünewald	West Germany	7.05	Q
18	?	Fernando Costa	Portugal	6.54	

=== Final ===
Rank	Name	Nationality	#1	#2	#3	#4	#5	#6	Result	Notes
1st place, gold medalist(s)	Igor Ter-Ovanesyan	Soviet Union	?	7.96	?	7.99	?	8.19	8.19	
2nd place, silver medalist(s)	Lynn Davies	Great Britain							7.89	
3rd place, bronze medalist(s)	Oleg Aleksandrov	Soviet Union							7.53	
4	Peter Reed	Great Britain							7.51	
5	Andrzej Plenkiewicz	Poland							7.47	
6	Adrian Samungi	Romania							7.44	
7	Béla Margitics	Hungary							7.38	
8	Michael Sauer	West Germany							7.34	
9	Volker Grünewald	West Germany							7.25	
10	Shinji Ogura	Japan							7.16	
11	Ignacio Martínez	Spain							7.11	
12	Miroslav Hutter	Czechoslovakia							7.06	
13	Naoki Abe	Japan							6.98	
14	Abelardo Pacheco	Cuba							6.97	
15	Aleksandar Genchev	Bulgaria							6.93	
16	Walter Zuberbühler	Switzerland							6.92	
17	Michel Vergès	France							6.55	
