= Sasin =

Sasin may refer to:

== People ==
- Dmitri Sasin (born 1996), Russian footballer
- Jacek Sasin (born 1969), Polish politician
- Pavel Sasín (born 1950), Czechoslovak triple jumper
- Paweł Sasin (born 1983), Polish footballer

== Other uses ==
- Selasphorus sasin, species of hummingbird
- Sasin Spraymaster, agricultural aircraft
- Sasin Graduate Institute of Business Administration of Chulalongkorn University
- SS-8 Sasin, two-stage IRBM of the Soviet Union
- Sasin, another name for the blackbuck (Antilope cervicapra)
