= Yukito =

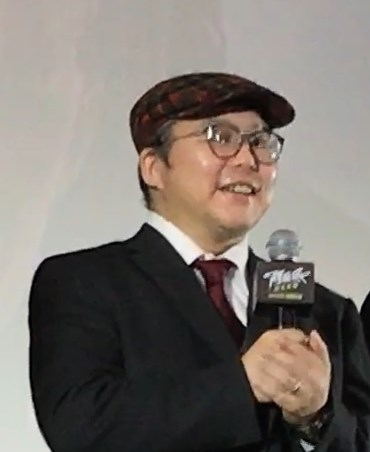
- Yukito Kishiro, Japanese mangaka.
- Pronunciation: jɯkʲito (IPA)
- Gender: Male

Origin
- Origin: Japanese
- Meaning: Different meanings depending on the kanji used

Yukito is a masculine Japanese given name.

== Written forms ==
Yukito can be written using different combinations of kanji characters. Some examples:

- 幸人, "happiness, person"
- 幸斗, "happiness, Big Dipper"
- 行人, "to go, person"
- 行斗, "to go, Big Dipper"
- 之人, "of, person"
- 之斗, "of, Big Dipper"
- 征人, "conquer, person"
- 志人, "determination, person"
- 志斗, "determination, Big Dipper"
- 恭人, "respectful, person"
- 五土, "5, earth"
- 雪人, "snow, person"
- 雪斗, "snow, Big Dipper"
- 雪兎, "snow, rabbit"
- 由紀人, "reason, chronicle, person"

The name can also be written in hiragana ゆきと or katakana ユキト.

== Notable people with the name ==
- Yukito Ara (新良 幸人; born 1967), Japanese musician and singer
- Yukito Ayatsuji (綾辻 行人; born 1960), pen name of Naoyuki Uchida, Japanese writer
- Yukito Kishiro (木城 五土; born 1967), Japanese manga artist
- Yukito Muraki (村木 征人; born 1945), Japanese triple jumper

== Characters ==
- Yukito Tsukishiro (月城 雪兎), a character in the anime and manga series Card Captor Sakura
- Yukito Orisaka (折笠 千斗), a character in the game, anime and manga franchises Idolish7
- Yukito Kunisaki (国崎 往人), the main character from the visual novel, anime and manga Air
