= Berk Tuna =

Turkish triple jumper

Personal information
- Full name: Berk Tuna
- Nationality: Turkey
- Born: 7 May 1976 (age 50) Manisa, Turkey
- Height: 1.80 m (5 ft 11 in)
- Weight: 75 kg (165 lb)

Sport
- Sport: Athletics
- Event: Triple jump
- Club: Enka Spor Kulubü
- Coached by: Aşkın Tuna

Achievements and titles
- Personal best: Triple jump: 16.67 (2004)

Berk Tuna (born 7 May 1976 in Manisa) is a retired Turkish triple jumper. Representing his nation Turkey at the 2004 Summer Olympics, Tuna held the national record at a remarkable jump of 16.67 metres from the Turkish Championships in Ankara, set in 2003. National record was broken by Seref Osmanoglu in 2015. Throughout his career in track and field, Tuna trained for Enka Sport Club (Turkish: Enka Spor Kulubü) in Istanbul, under his personal coach, father, and two-time Olympian Aşkın Tuna (1964 and 1968).

Tuna qualified for the Turkish squad in the men's triple jump at the 2004 Summer Olympics in Athens by spanning a Turkish record-breaking jump and an Olympic B-standard of 16.67 m from the 2003 Turkish Championships in Ankara. Tuna crashed out of the qualifying round without attaining a mark against his name, after failing to produce a single legal jump in all three attempts.
