= Michał Joachimowski =

Polish triple jumper (1950–2014)

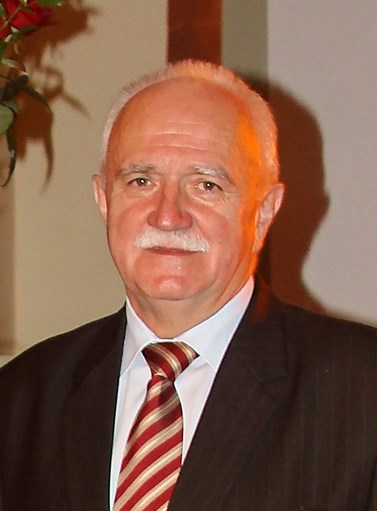
- Joachimowski in 2010

Personal information
- Nationality: Polish
- Born: 26 September 1950 Żnin, Poland
- Died: 19 January 2014 (aged 63) Bydgoszcz, Poland

Sport
- Event: Triple jump
Medal record
Representing Poland
Men's athletics
European Indoor Championships
Gold medal – first place	1974 Gothenburg	Triple jump
Silver medal – second place	1973 Rotterdam	Triple jump
Silver medal – second place	1975 Katowice	Triple jump

Michał Teodor Joachimowski (26 September 1950 – 19 January 2014) was a triple jumper from Poland. He won three medals at the European Indoor Championships.

He was born in Żnin and represented the clubs Budowlani Bydgoszcz and Zawisza Bydgoszcz. He finished eighth at the 1972 European Indoor Championships, and seventh at the 1972 Olympic Games. He then got a silver medal at the 1973 European Indoor Championships and won gold at the 1974 European Indoor Championships setting a new world indoor record of 17.03 metres (this remains the Polish record to this day).

He did not do quite as well at the 1974 European Championships, when he placed fifth. At the 1975 European Indoor Championships he took another silver medal, and he followed with a victory at the 1975 Summer Universiade. At the 1976 Olympic Games he finished thirteenth.

He was the Polish champion in 1972, 1973, 1974, 1975, 1976 and 1978 and Polish indoor champion in 1973, 1974 and 1975. His personal best jump was 17.06 metres (55.97 ft), achieved in June 1973 in Warsaw.

== Competition record ==
Year	Competition	Venue	Position	Notes
Representing Poland
1968	European Junior Championships	Leipzig, East Germany	4th	15.19 m
1972	European Indoor Championships	Grenoble, France	8th	16.21 m
1972	Olympic Games	Munich, West Germany	7th	16.69 m
1973	European Indoor Championships	Rotterdam, Netherlands	2nd	16.75 m
1974	European Indoor Championships	Gothenburg, Sweden	1st	17.03 m
1974	European Championships	Rome, Italy	5th	16.53 m
1975	European Indoor Championships	Katowice, Poland	2nd	16.90 m
1975	Universiade	Rome, Italy	1st	16.54 m
1976	Olympic Games	Montreal, Canada	13th (q)	16.29 m
