= Hwang Jeong-dae =

South Korean triple jumper

Personal information
- Nationality: South Korean
- Born: 14 September 1940 (age 85)

Sport
- Sport: Athletics
- Event: Triple jump

Hwang Jeong-dae (born 14 September 1940) is a South Korean athlete. He competed in the men's triple jump at the 1964 Summer Olympics.

Hwang jumped 13.98 m to finish 29th in qualification in the triple jump at the 1964 Games.
