= Wilfredo Maisonave =

Puerto Rican former long jumper (born 1951)

Personal information
- Full name: Wilfredo Maisonave Oriol
- Born: 17 September 1951 (age 74) Mayagüez, Puerto Rico
- Height: 1.78 m (5 ft 10 in)
- Weight: 72 kg (159 lb)

Sport
- Sport: Athletics
- Event: Long jump
Medal record
Representing Puerto Rico
Central American and Caribbean Games
Gold medal – first place	1974 Santo Domingo	Long jump

Wilfredo Maisonave Oriol (born 17 September 1951) is a Puerto Rican former long jumper who competed in the 1972 Summer Olympics. He was one of the torch lighters of the 2010 Central American and Caribbean Games.

== International competitions ==
Year	Competition	Venue	Position	Event	Notes
Representing Puerto Rico
1970	Central American and Caribbean Games	Panama City, Panama	6th	Long jump	7.33 m
1971	Central American and Caribbean Championships	Kingston, Jamaica	2nd	Long jump	7.38 m
1971	Central American and Caribbean Championships	Kingston, Jamaica	4th	Triple jump	15.15 m
1972	Olympic Games	Munich, West Germany	23rd (q)	Long jump	7.58 m
1972	Olympic Games	Munich, West Germany	28th (q)	Triple jump	15.38 m
1973	Central American and Caribbean Championships	Maracaibo, Venezuela	3rd	Long jump	7.28 m
1973	Central American and Caribbean Championships	Maracaibo, Venezuela	6th	Triple jump	15.17 m
1973	Universiade	Moscow, Soviet Union	21st (q)	Long jump	7.31 m
1973	Universiade	Moscow, Soviet Union	11th	Triple jump	15.06 m
1974	Central American and Caribbean Games	Santo Domingo, Dominican Republic	1st	Long jump	7.44 m

== Personal bests ==
- Long jump – 7.80 (1971)
- Triple jump – 15.95 (1975)
