= Aşkın Tuna =

Turkish triple jumper (born 1940)

Personal information
- Nationality: Turkish
- Born: 21 July 1940 (age 85) Manisa, Turkey
- Height: 1.83 m (6 ft 0 in)

Sport
- Event: Triple jump

Aşkın Tuna (born 21 July 1940) is a Turkish triple jumper.

== Career ==
He competed at the 1964 Summer Olympics, the 1968 Summer Olympics, the 1966 European Championships and the 1971 European Championships, as well as the 1966 and 1967 European Indoor Games without reaching the final.

Tuna finished 11th at the 1965 Summer Universiade, 8th at the 1968 European Indoor Games, 15th at the 1971 European Indoor Championships and 5th at the 1971 Mediterranean Games.

Domestically, he became Turkish champion in 1964, 1966, 1969 and 1970 as well as Turkish long jump champion in 1969.

== Personal life ==
He is the father of Berk Tuna.
