= 1968 European Indoor Games – Men's long jump =

The men's long jump event at the 1968 European Indoor Games was held on 9 March in Madrid.

== Results ==
Rank	Name	Nationality	#1	#2	#3	#4	#5	#6	Result	Notes
1st place, gold medalist(s)	Igor Ter-Ovanesyan	Soviet Union	7.91	8.16	8.01	x	7.86	x	8.16	
2nd place, silver medalist(s)	Tõnu Lepik	Soviet Union	7.79	7.87	7.81	7.81	x	x	7.87	
3rd place, bronze medalist(s)	Bernhard Stierle	West Germany	x	7.27	x	7.35	7.42	7.59	7.59	
4	Klaus Beer	East Germany	7.42	7.44	7.14	7.55	x	7.54	7.55	
5	Jacques Pani	France	7.53	7.48	x	x	7.51	7.53	7.53	
6	Jacinto Segura	Spain	x	7.32	7.44	7.34	7.45	7.17	7.45	
7	Dimitrios Maglaras	Greece							7.18	
8	Michael Sauer	West Germany							7.14	
9	Petar Marin	Bulgaria							7.09	
10	Miroslav Hutter	Czechoslovakia							6.81	
11	Pasquale Santoro	Italy							5.43	
	Rafael Blanquer	Spain							DNS	
