= Carol Corbu =

Romanian triple jumper

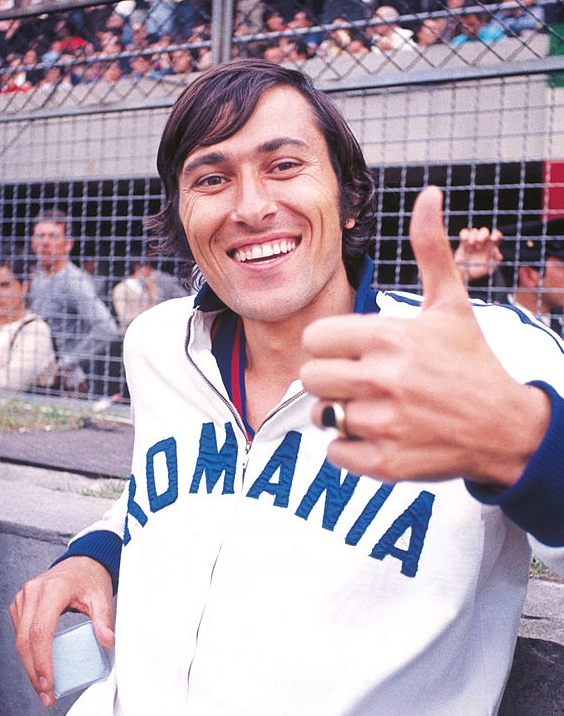
- Carol Corbu at the 1972 Olympics

Personal information
- Born: 8 February 1946 (age 80) Văleni-Podgoria, Argeş, Romania
- Height: 1.97 m (6 ft 6 in)
- Weight: 85 kg (187 lb)

Sport
- Sport: Triple jump, long jump
- Club: CSA Steaua București

Achievements and titles
- Personal bests: 17.12 m (TJ, 1971); 7.92 m (LJ, 1972)
Medal record
Men's athletics
Representing Romania
European Championships
Silver medal – second place	1974 Rome	Triple jump
Bronze medal – third place	1971 Helsinki	Triple jump
European Indoor Championships
Gold medal – first place	1973 Rotterdam	Triple jump
Silver medal – second place	1971 Sofia	Triple jump
Silver medal – second place	1972 Grenoble	Triple jump
Silver medal – second place	1976 Munich	Triple jump

Carol Corbu (born 8 February 1946) is a retired Romanian athlete who mostly competed in the triple jump. In this event he won the 1973 European Indoor Championships as well as two medals at the European Championships outdoor.

His personal best jump was 17.12 metres, achieved in June 1971 in Turin. This ranks him third among Romanian triple jumpers, only behind Marian Oprea and Bedros Bedrosian.

At the 1972 Olympics Corbu competed both in the long jump and triple jump.

== International competitions ==
Year	Competition	Venue	Position	Event	Notes
1966	European Junior Games	Odessa, Soviet Union	3rd	Triple jump	15.43 m
1969	European Indoor Games	Belgrade, Yugoslavia	3rd	Triple jump	16.20 m
1969	European Championships	Athens, Greece	4th	Triple jump	16.56 m
1970	European Indoor Championships	Vienna, Austria	6th	Triple jump	16.35 m
1970	Universiade	Turin, Italy	4th	Triple jump	16.69 m
1971	European Indoor Championships	Sofia, Bulgaria	2nd	Triple jump	16.83 m
1971	European Championships	Helsinki, Finland	3rd	Triple jump	16.87 m
1972	European Indoor Championships	Grenoble, France	9th	Long jump	7.62 m
1972	European Indoor Championships	Grenoble, France	2nd	Triple jump	16.89 m
1972	Olympic Games	Munich, West Germany	25th (q)	Long jump	7.54 m
1972	Olympic Games	Munich, West Germany	4th	Triple jump	16.85 m
1973	European Indoor Championships	Rotterdam, Netherlands	1st	Triple jump	16.80 m
1974	European Indoor Championships	Gothenburg, Sweden	10th	Long jump	7.34 m
1974	European Championships	Rome, Italy	2nd	Triple jump	16.68 m
1975	European Indoor Championships	Katowice, Poland	5th	Long jump	7.64 m
1975	European Indoor Championships	Katowice, Poland	4th	Triple jump	16.66 m
1976	European Indoor Championships	Munich, West Germany	2nd	Triple jump	16.75 m
1976	Olympic Games	Montreal, Canada	8th	Triple jump	16.43 m
1978	European Indoor Championships	Milan, Italy	4th	Triple jump	16.41 m
1978	European Championships	Prague, Czechoslovakia	14th	Triple jump	16.02 m
