= Nelson Prudêncio =

Brazilian triple jumper (1944-2012)

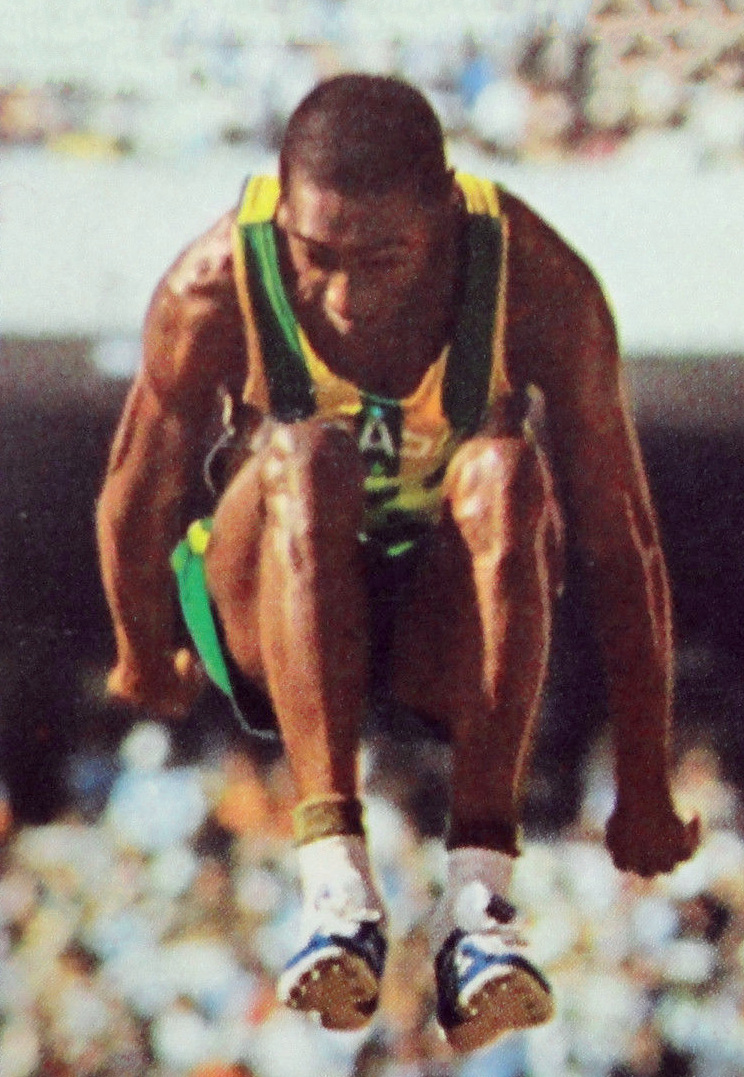
- Nelson Prudêncio in 1968

Personal information
- Born: April 4, 1944 Lins, São Paulo
- Died: November 23, 2012 (aged 68) São Carlos, São Paulo
- Height: 1.82 m (6 ft 0 in)
- Weight: 71 kg (157 lb)

Sport
- Sport: Athletics
- Event: Triple jump

Achievements and titles
- Personal best: 17.27 m (1968)
Medal record
Representing Brazil
Olympic Games
Silver medal – second place	1968 Mexico City	Triple Jump
Bronze medal – third place	1972 Munich	Triple jump
Pan American Games
Silver medal – second place	1967 Winnipeg	Triple Jump
Silver medal – second place	1971 Cali	Triple jump

Nelson Prudêncio (April 4, 1944 – November 23, 2012) was a Brazilian athlete who competed in the triple jump. He won silver medals at the 1967 and 1971 Pan American Games and 1968 Summer Olympics, and a bronze at the 1972 Summer Olympics. Prudêncio was ranked world's #2 in 1968, #3 in 1972, #5 in 1975, and #8 in 1971.

Prudêncio's jump of 17.27 metres (56 feet 8 inches) at the 1968 Olympics was the world record before Viktor Saneyev extended it to 17.39 metres (57 feet 1 inch) a few minutes later.

Prudêncio was Professor of Physical Education at the Federal University of São Carlos and vice-president of Confederação Brasileira de Atletismo (Brazilian Athletics Confederation). He died of lung cancer on November 23, 2012, in São Carlos. He was 68 years old.

== International competitions ==
Year	Competition	Venue	Position	Event	Notes
Representing Brazil
1965	South American Championships	Rio de Janeiro, Brazil	1st	Triple jump	14.96 m
1967	Pan American Games	Winnipeg, Canada	10th	Long jump	6.92 m
1967	Pan American Games	Winnipeg, Canada	2nd	Triple jump	16.45 m
1967	South American Championships	Buenos Aires, Argentina	5th	Long jump	6.92 m
1967	South American Championships	Buenos Aires, Argentina	1st	Triple jump	16.30 m
1968	Olympic Games	Mexico City, Mexico	2nd	Triple jump	17.27 m
1969	South American Championships	Quito, Ecuador	5th	Long jump	7.00 m
1969	South American Championships	Quito, Ecuador	1st	Triple jump	16.34 m
1970	Universiade	Turin, Italy	8th	Triple jump	16.29 m
1971	Pan American Games	Cali, Colombia	2nd	Triple jump	16.82 m
1971	South American Championships	Lima, Peru	4th	Long jump	7.19 m
1971	South American Championships	Lima, Peru	1st	Triple jump	15.58 m
1972	Olympic Games	Munich, West Germany	3rd	Triple jump	17.05 m
1974	South American Championships	Santiago, Chile	2nd	Triple jump	16.09 m
1975	South American Championships	Rio de Janeiro, Brazil	2nd	Triple jump	16.45 m
1975	Pan American Games	Mexico City, Mexico	4th	Triple jump	16.85 m
1976	Olympic Games	Montreal, Canada	14th (q)	Triple jump	16.22 m

Records
Preceded by (Soviet Union) Viktor Sanyeyev	Men's Triple Jump World Record Holder; 1968-10-17	Succeeded by (Soviet Union) Viktor Sanyeyev
