= Jim Smith (decathlete) =

British decathlete

Personal information
- Nationality: British (English)
- Born: Q3. 1946 Luton, England

Sport
- Sport: Athletics
- Event: Decathlon
- Club: Luton United AC

James R. Smith (born 1946) is a former international athlete who competed at the Commonwealth Games.

== Biography ==
Smith was a member of the Luton United AC and specialised in the decathlon In 1967, when attending the University of Southampton, he won the British Universities Sports Federation title and the following year set a Southern Counties championships record of 6,777 points.

Smith represented the England team at the 1970 British Commonwealth Games in Edinburgh, Scotland, where he competed in the decathlon event, finishing just outside the medal rostrum in fourth place.

Shortly after the Games, Smith finished third at the AAA Championships, behind Peter Gabbett and Barry King at the 1970 AAA Championships.
