= Ghazi Saleh Marzouk =

Saudi Arabian athlete

Personal information
- Nationality: Saudi Arabian
- Born: 5 March 1951 (age 75)

Sport
- Sport: Athletics
- Event: Triple jump

Ghazi Saleh Marzouk (born 5 March 1951) is a Saudi Arabian athlete. He competed in the men's triple jump at the 1972 Summer Olympics and the men's high jump at the 1976 Summer Olympics.
