= Hartley Saunders =

Bahamian triple jumper

Personal information
- Nationality: Bahamian
- Born: 7 November 1943
- Died: 9 June 2004 (aged 60)

Sport
- Sport: Athletics
- Event: Triple jump

Hartley C. Saunders (7 November 1943 – 9 June 2004) was a Bahamian athlete. He competed in the men's triple jump at the 1964 Summer Olympics.
