= Athletics at the 1970 British Commonwealth Games – Men's decathlon =

Men's decathlon at the 1970 British Commonwealth Games
- Venue: Meadowbank Stadium, Edinburgh
- Dates: 21 and 22 July 1970

Medalists
gold medal	Geoff Smith	Australia
silver medal	Peter Gabbett	England
bronze medal	Barry King	England

The men's decathlon event at the 1970 British Commonwealth Games was held on 21 and 22 July at the Meadowbank Stadium in Edinburgh, Scotland.

== Results ==
† The highest mark recorded in each event is highlighted in yellow and marked with a dagger, †

Full results
Rank	Athlete	Nationality	100m	LJ	SP	HJ	400m	110m H	DT	PV	JT	1500m	Points	Notes
1st place, gold medalist(s)	Geoff Smith	Australia	10.9	6.93	13.20	1.70	48.7†	14.6w†	38.82	4.20	60.12	4:36.0	7492	
2nd place, silver medalist(s)	Peter Gabbett	England	10.7†	7.51†	11.86	1.89	48.7†	15.3	41.70	3.30	55.96	4:30.0†	7469	
3rd place, bronze medalist(s)	Barry King	England	11.3	7.02	15.63†	1.70	51.4	16.5	43.60†	3.80	65.04†	4:52.1	7201	
4	Jim Smith	England	10.7†	7.05	12.64	1.86	52.2	15.2w	35.80	3.80	48.46	4:53.6	7033	
5	Steve Spencer	Canada	11.6	6.45	12.98	1.89	52.6	15.5w	38.92	3.50	57.70	4:42.5	6863	
6	Gordon Stewart	Canada	11.3	6.67	12.04	1.75	50.9	15.8	35.28	4.50†	47.84	4:46.4	6863	
7	Roger Main	New Zealand	11.2	6.40	13.25	1.67	51.0	15.4	39.00	3.60	40.28	4:56.4	6548	
8	Ian Grant	Scotland	11.3	6.10	9.39	1.83	52.8	16.8	33.34	3.10	49.66	4:49.0	6048	
9	David Kidner	Scotland	11.3	7.14	12.51	1.94†	54.0	15.2w	38.16	NM	44.14	5:12.3	6030	
10	Luc Bax	Mauritius	12.0	6.08	11.08	?.??	60.1	16.1	32.34	3.10	43.74	5:32.1	5250	
	Vijay Singh Chauhan	India	11.4	6.73	10.55	1.83	50.9	?.??	–	–	–	–	DNF	
	Roland Boulle	Mauritius	12.0	5.78	13.08	?.??	–	–	–	–	–	–	DNF	
	Roy Williams	New Zealand	11.2	6.97	12.57	?.??	–	–	–	–	–	–	DNF	
	Calvin Greenaway	Antigua and Barbuda	DNS	–	–	–	–	–	–	–	–	–	DNS	

=== Abbreviations in table headings ===
In the order they appear:

- LJ – Long jump
- SP – Shot put
- HJ – High jump
- H – Hurdles
- DT – Discus throw
- PV – Pole vault
- JT – Javelin throw
