= Eardley (name) =

Eardley is both a surname and a given name.

Notable people with the name include:

Surname:

- Bert Eardley (born 1879), English footballer
- Billy Eardley (1871–?), footballer
- Constance Margaret Eardley (1910–1978), Australian botanist, lecturer and curator
- Francis Eardley (1885–1954), footballer
- George Harold Eardley (1912–1991), English recipient of the Victoria Cross
- Joan Eardley (1921–1963), British artist
- Jon Eardley (1928–1991), American jazz trumpeter
- Neal Eardley (born 1988), Welsh international footballer
- Richard Eardley (born 1928), mayor of Boise, Idaho
- Robert Eardley (born 1944), Bahamian sailor

Given name:

- Eardley Knollys (1902–1991), English artist and art dealer
- Eardley Norton (1852–1931), Madras barrister, judge and politician of British origin
- Eardley Peiris, radio announcer
