= Héctor Serrate =

Puerto Rican triple jumper

Personal information
- Nationality: Puerto Rican
- Born: 24 July 1946 (age 79) Santurce, Puerto Rico
- Height: 1.70 m (5 ft 7 in)
- Weight: 57 kg (126 lb)

Sport
- Sport: Athletics
- Event: Triple jump

Héctor Serrate (born 24 July 1946) is a retired Puerto Rican athlete. He competed in the men's triple jump at the 1968 Summer Olympics.

His personal best in the event is 16.09 metres set in 1968.

== International competitions ==
Year	Competition	Venue	Position	Event	Notes
Representing the Puerto Rico
1968	Olympic Games	Mexico City, Mexico	33rd (q)	Triple jump	15.09 m
