= Abelardo Pacheco =

Cuban athlete

Personal information
- Full name: Abelardo Santiago Pacheco González
- Nickname: Cuco
- Nationality: Cuban
- Born: 25 July 1939 (age 87) Havana, Cuba

Sport
- Sport: Athletics
- Event: Long jump
Medal record
Representing Cuba
Central American and Caribbean Games
Gold medal – first place	1970 Panama City	Long jump
Silver medal – second place	1966 San Juan	Long jump
Bronze medal – third place	1962 Kingston	Long jump

Abelardo Santiago Pacheco González (born 25 July 1939) is a retired Cuban athlete who specialised in the long jump. He won several medals at regional level. He later worked as an athletics coach.

His personal best in the event was 7.77 metres set in Havana in 1965.

== International competitions ==
Year	Competition	Venue	Position	Event	Notes
Representing Cuba
1962	Central American and Caribbean Games	Kingston, Jamaica	3rd	Long jump	7.16 m
1965	Universiade	Budapest, Hungary	11th (h)	4 × 100 m relay	42.0 s
1965	Universiade	Budapest, Hungary	14th	Long jump	6.97 m
1966	Central American and Caribbean Games	San Juan, Puerto Rico	2nd	Long jump	7.55 m
1967	Pan American Games	Winnipeg, Canada	7th	Long jump	7.17 m
1967	Central American and Caribbean Championships	Xalapa, Mexico	1st	Long jump	7.49 m
1970	Central American and Caribbean Games	Panama City, Panama	1st	Long jump	7.69 m
1970	Universiade	Turin, Italy	9th	Long jump	7.52 m
1971	Central American and Caribbean Championships	Kingston, Jamaica	3rd	Long jump	7.19 m
1971	Pan American Games	Cali, Colombia	7th	Long jump	7.38 m
