= Joachim Kugler =

German triple jumper

Personal information
- Nationality: German
- Born: 19 September 1947 (age 78) Backnang, Germany

Sport
- Sport: Athletics
- Event: Triple jump
- Club: TV Murrhardt, USC Mainz, ASC Darmstadt

Joachim Kugler (born 19 September 1947) is a German triple jumper.

He finished eleventh in the men's triple jump at the 1968 Summer Olympics, won the 1968 CISM Military World Championships, finished ninth at the 1971 European Championships and ninth at the 1973 European Indoor Championships.

He became West German champion in 1974 and 1975; won silver medal in 1971, 1972, 1973 and 1976 and bronze medals in 1966 and 1968. He represented the clubs TV Murrhardt, USC Mainz and ASC Darmstadt. Indoors he won five medals, including gold in 1975.
