= 1970 AAA Championships =

Outdoor track and field competition

- Dates: 7–9 August 1970
- Host city: London, England
- Venue: White City Stadium
- Level: Senior
- Type: Outdoor

The 1970 AAA Championships was the 1970 edition of the annual outdoor track and field competition organised by the Amateur Athletic Association (AAA). It was held from 7 to 9 August 1970 at White City Stadium in London, England.

== Summary ==
The Championships covered two days of competition. The marathon was held from Windsor to Chiswick and the decathlon event was held in Crystal Palace.

The championships were held at the White City Stadium for the last time.

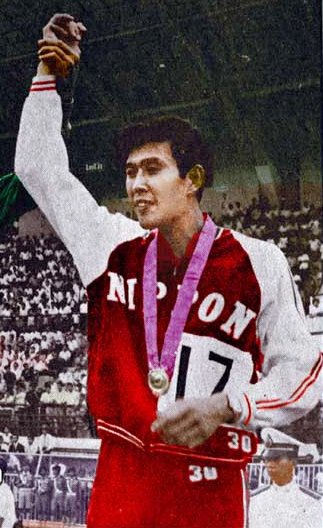
Hidehiko Tomizawa won the high jump during a successful meeting for the Japanese athletes

== Results ==
Event	Gold		Silver		Bronze	
100m	(Bermuda) Gary Symonds	10.3w	Brian Green	10.4w	Ian Green	10.5w
200m	Martin Reynolds	21.00w	David Dear	21.40w	Mick Hauck	21.60w
400m	Martin Bilham	46.65	(Republic of Ireland) Fanahan McSweeney	47.08	Len Walters	47.3
800m	Andy Carter	1:49.56	Peter Browne	1:49.58	(Scotland) Mike MacLean	1:49.68
1,500m	Walter Wilkinson	3:45.31	John Kirkbride	3:45.68	(Scotland) Ian Stewart	3:46.12
5,000m	Chris Stewart	13:49.58	Alan Blinston	13:50.84	(East Germany) Wilfried Scholz	13:51.84
10,000m	Dave Bedford	28:26.28	Trevor Wright	28:38.06	Bob Holt	28:40.28
10 miles	Trevor Wright	47:20.2	Ron Hill	47:35.2	Ron Grove	47:42.2
marathon	Don Faircloth	2:18:15	Chris Wade	2:19:15	Bob Richardson	2:20:1
3000m steeplechase	Andy Holden	8:38.0	Bernie Hayward	8:43.8	John Jackson	8:44.4
110m hurdles	David Hemery	13.9	(Wales) Berwyn Price	14.2	Graham Gower	14.3
400m hurdles	Bob Roberts	52.42	Tony Collins	52.42	Andy Webb	52.51
3,000m walk	Paul Nihill	12:13.8	Roger Mills	12:35.0	Phil Embleton	12:35.8
10,000m walk	(Scotland) Bill Sutherland	45:16.8	Roger Mills	46:47.0	Tony Taylor	46:51.2
high jump	(Japan) Hidehiko Tomizawa	2.08	(Japan) Kuniyoshi Sugioka	2.08	(United States) John Dobroth	2.05
pole vault	(Japan) Kiyoshi Niwa	5.00	Mike Bull	4.90	(Canada) Bruce Simpson	4.60
long jump	Alan Lerwill	7.64	(Japan) Hiroomi Yamada	7.60	(Japan) Shinji Ogura	7.45
triple jump	(Japan) Yukito Muraki	15.91	Tony Wadhams	15.62	Derek Boosey	15.21
shot put	(New Zealand) Les Mills	18.66	Jeff Teale	18.02	Geoff Capes	17.53
discus throw	Bill Tancred	53.88	(New Zealand) Les Mills	53.60	John Watts	53.50
hammer throw	Howard Payne	67.66	(Japan) Yoshihisa Ishida	66.24	(Japan) Shigenobu Murofushi	63.06
javelin throw	Dave Travis	76.90	John McSorley	72.60	Mladen Gavrilovic	71.70
decathlon	Peter Gabbett	733	Barry King	7202	Jim Smith	6800

== See also ==
- 1970 WAAA Championships
