= Dave Holt (athlete) =

English runner

Personal information
- Born: May 18, 1944 (age 81)

Sport
- Sport: Athletics
- Event: 10000 metres
- Club: Hercules AC, Hercules-Wimbledon AC

Achievements and titles
- Olympic finals: 1972 Summer Olympics – 10000 metres (11th in heat)

Dave Holt (born 18 May 1944) is a former English distance runner, who competed in the 10000 metres at the 1972 Summer Olympics in Munich, where he placed eleventh in his heat in 28 minutes 46.8. His personal best was 28 minutes 41.82, which he set at Crystal Palace on 15 July 1972. He originally competed for Hercules AC, and following that club's merger with Wimbledon AC, he competed for Hercules-Wimbledon AC. His twin brother Bob Holt had a faster personal best of 28 minutes 39.8, set in September 1972, but did not compete at a major championship.
