= Bob Holt (athlete) =

English distance runner

Personal information
- Nationality: British (English)
- Born: 18 May 1944 (age 81) Hammersmith, London, England

Sport
- Sport: Athletics
- Event: long distance
- Club: Hercules Wimbledon AC

Robert E. Holt (born 18 May 1944) is a former English distance runner.

== Biography ==
Holt was born in London, England as a twin. His brother Dave Holt would also become an athlete and competed at the 1972 Summer Olympics. Both brothers originally competed for Hercules AC, and following that club's merger with Wimbledon AC, he competed for Hercules-Wimbledon AC.

Bob finished second behind Dave Bedford in the 10,000 metres event at the 1970 AAA Championships at White City Stadium, recording 28 minutes 40.28.

Bob recorded a faster personal best than his brother over 10,000 metres with a time of 28 minutes 39.8, set in September 1972, whereas Dave's personal best was 28 minutes 41.82, which he set at Crystal Palace on 15 July 1972.
