= Athletics at the 1967 Pan American Games – Men's long jump =

Men's long jump at the Pan American Games

The men's long jump event at the 1967 Pan American Games was held in Winnipeg on 4 August.

== Results ==
Rank	Name	Nationality	Result	Notes
1st place, gold medalist(s)	Ralph Boston	United States	8.29	
2nd place, silver medalist(s)	Bob Beamon	United States	8.07	
3rd place, bronze medalist(s)	Wellesley Clayton	Jamaica	7.76	
4	José Hernández	Cuba	7.50	
5	David Samuel	Puerto Rico	7.41	
6	Michel Charland	Canada	7.37	
7	Abelardo Pacheco	Cuba	7.17	
8	Bill Greenough	Canada	7.12	
9	Leslie Miller	Bahamas	6.93	
10	Nelson Prudêncio	Brazil	6.92	
11	Jorge Toro	Puerto Rico	6.54	
