= Maurizio Siega =

Italian former long jumper

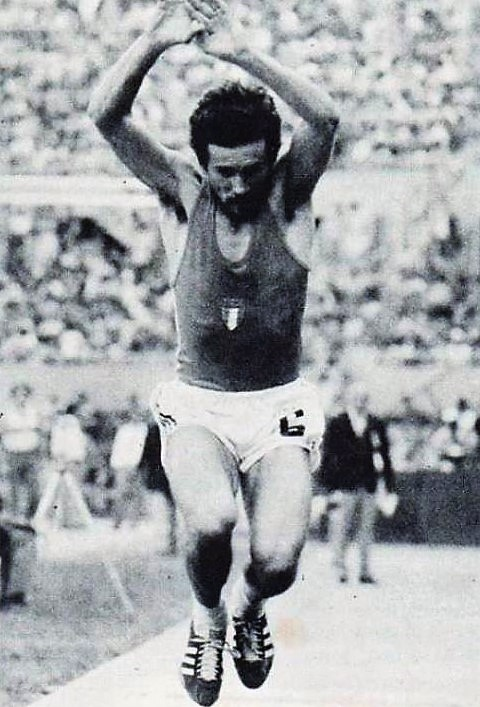

Personal information
- National team: Italy: 1 (1972–1979)
- Born: 29 October 1954 (age 71) Palmanova, Italy

Sport
- Sport: Athletics
- Event(s): Long jump Triple jump
- Club: Fiamme Oro Padova (1977); Tosi Tarvisio (1979)

Achievements and titles
- Personal bests: Long jump: 7.88 m (1975); Triple jump: 16.12 m (1976)

Maurizio Siega (born 29 October 1954) is a former Italian long jumper and triple jumper.

== Career ==
Two-time national champion at senior level in long jump in 1977 and 1979.

== Achievements ==
Year	Competition	Venue	Rank	Event	Measure	Notes
1975	Mediterranean Games	(Algeria) Algiers	5th	Triple jump	15.46 m	
1975	Universiade	(Italy) Rome	7th	Triple jump	15.87 m	
1977	Universiade	(Bulgaria) Sofia	Qual.	Long jump	7.24 m	
