= Klaus Neumann =

German triple jumper

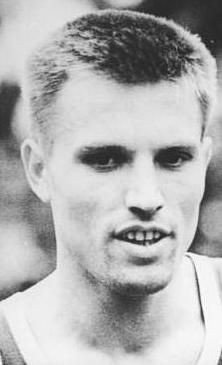

Personal information
- Nationality: German
- Born: 4 January 1942 (age 84) Habelschwerdt, Germany

Sport
- Sport: Athletics
- Event: Triple jump
Medal record
Men's athletics
Representing East Germany
European Championships
Bronze medal – third place	1969 Athens	Triple jump

Klaus Neumann (born 4 January 1942) is a German athlete. He competed in the men's triple jump at the 1968 Summer Olympics.
