= Martin Jensen (triple jumper) =

Norwegian triple jumper

Personal information
- Nationality: Norwegian
- Born: 3 January 1942
- Died: 12 February 2016 (aged 74)

Sport
- Sport: Athletics
- Event: triple jump

Martin Jensen (3 January 1942 – 12 February 2016) was a Norwegian triple jumper.

== Biography ==
jensen hailed from Askøy Municipality and represented the local sports club Ask IL, later TIF Viking in Bergen, IL i BUL and IK Tjalve in Oslo. He competed at the 1966 European Indoor Games and the 1966 European Athletics Championships without reaching the final. Domestically, Jensen became Norwegian champion in 1961, 1964, 1965, 1966 and 1969.

His personal best jump was 16.27 metres, achieved in 1965. He was a Norwegian record holder, being the first in that country to break the 16-metre barrier. His main domestic competitors were Odd Bergh and Kristen Fløgstad, who eventually broke Jensen's record. Jensen also had 6.82 in the long jump, achieved in 1964. Martin Jensen died in 2016, at the age of 74.

Jensen finished second behind Fred Alsop in the triple jump event at the British 1965 AAA Championships.
