= Ryszard Garnys =

Polish triple jumper

Ryszard Garnys (born 8 March 1947) is a retired Polish triple jumper.

He was born in Tuszyn and represented the club Start Łódż. He finished fourth at the 1966 European Junior Championships, and fourth at the 1974 European Indoor Championships, only five centimetres behind bronze medalist Bernard Lamitié. He finished eleventh at the 1974 European Championships.

His best result at the Polish Championships was a silver medal, achieved in 1971. His personal best jump was 16.52 metres, achieved in 1974 in Warsaw.
