= Robert Eardley =

Bahamian sailor

Robert Eardley (12 January 1945 – 10 November 2022) was a Bahamian former sailor who competed in the 1964 Summer Olympics.
