= Viktor Kravchenko (athlete) =

Soviet triple jumper (1941–2026)

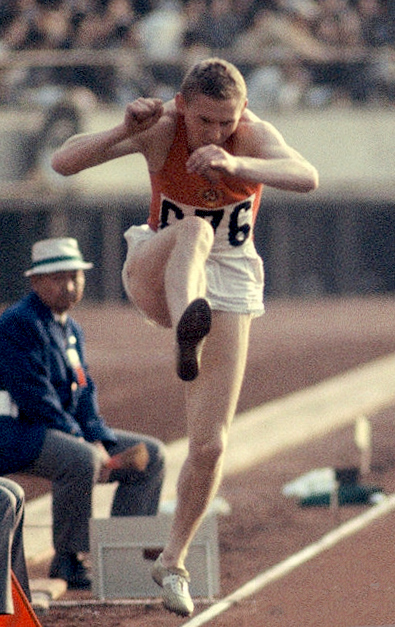
- Kravchenko at the 1964 Olympics

Personal information
- Born: 15 May 1941 Rostov-on-Don, Russian SSR, Soviet Union
- Died: 7 April 2026 (aged 84)
- Height: 1.72 m (5 ft 8 in)
- Weight: 65 kg (143 lb)

Sport
- Sport: Triple jump
- Club: Dynamo Rostov

Achievements and titles
- Personal best: 16.57 m (1964)
Medal record
Men's athletics
Representing the Soviet Union
Olympic Games
Bronze medal – third place	1964 Tokyo	Triple jump

Viktor Petrovich Kravchenko (Russian: Виктор Пeтрович Кравченко; 15 May 1941 – 7 April 2026) was a Russian triple jumper who won a bronze medal at the 1964 Olympics with his all-time best jump of 16.57 m. Domestically Kravchenko won a Soviet title in 1964 and 1966, and finished second in 1967.
