= Graham Boase =

Australian triple jumper

Graham Boase (born 12 October 1941) is an Australian former triple jumper who competed in the 1964 Summer Olympics.
