= Richard Kick =

German triple jumper

Personal information
- Born: 2 May 1947 (age 79)

Sport
- Sport: Track and field

Richard Kick (born 2 May 1947) is a retired German triple jumper.

He finished seventh at the 1973 European Indoor Championships, sixth at the 1974 European Indoor Championships eighth at the 1977 European Indoor Championships.

He became West German champion in 1972 and 1973, and won bronze medals in 1970, 1971, 1975 and 1976. He represented the clubs LG Regensburg, TSV 1860 München and LAC Quelle Fürth. Indoors he won five silver medals and the gold in 1974.
