= Michael Sauer (triple jumper) =

German triple jumper (born 1941)

Personal information
- Born: 27 August 1941 (age 84) Recklinghausen, West Germany

Sport
- Sport: Track and field
Medal record
Representing Germany
Summer Universiade
Gold medal – first place	1967 Tokyo	Triple jump
Bronze medal – third place	1965 Budapest	Triple jump
European Indoor Championships
Silver medal – second place	1966 Dortmund	Triple jump

Michael Sauer (born 27 August 1941) is a German former triple jumper.

His international medals include bronze at the 1965 Summer Universiade, silver at the 1966 European Indoor Games and gold at the 1967 Summer Universiade.

Other results including sixth at the 1966 European Championships, fifth at the 1967 European Indoor Games, seventh at the 1968 European Indoor Games, fourth at the 1969 European Indoor Games, fourth at the 1970 European Indoor Championships, eighth at the 1971 European Indoor Championships, fourth at the 1971 European Championships, and sixth at the 1972 European Indoor Championships. He also competed at the 1968 Olympic Games without reaching the final.

Sauer became West German champion every year from 1963 to 1971 except for 1966. Indoors he became West German champion every year from 1963 to 1972, won a national bronze medal every year from 1973 to 1976 and a last gold medal in 1979. He represented the club TSV 1860 München early on, then USC Mainz. He received the Rudolf Harbig Memorial Award in 1975. His personal best jump was 16.77 metres, achieved in 1968.

In the long jump, he finished eighth at the 1965 Summer Universiade, seventh at the 1967 Summer Universiade and eighth at the 1968 European Indoor Games.

Outside of sports, Sauer was a sports journalist for the Südwestfunk and ZDF, including a stint as a presenter of the weekly sports show Pfiff. He received the Order of Merit of the Federal Republic of Germany in 1997.
