= Petr Nemšovský =

Czechoslovak triple jumper (1943–2020)

Petr Nemšovský, also spelled Peter (6 January 1943 – 11 May 2020) was a Czechoslovak triple jumper, born in Bratislava, Slovakia.

== Career ==
He won the bronze medal at the 1966 European Indoor Games and won the 1967 European Indoor Games, finished tenth at the 1966 European Championships and fifth at the 1968 European Indoor Games.

He became Czechoslovak champion in 1965, 1966, 1967 and 1969; and Czechoslovak indoor champion (in long jump) in 1969.

Nemšovský died in Prague on May 11, 2020.
