= Evangelos Vlasis =

Greek triple jumper

Personal information
- Nationality: Greek
- Born: 27 December 1944 Attica, Greece
- Died: 10 January 2014 (aged 69) Thessaloniki, Greece

Sport
- Sport: Athletics
- Event: Triple jump

Evangelos Vlasis (27 December 1944 – 10 January 2014) was a Greek athlete. He competed in the men's triple jump at the 1968 Summer Olympics.
