= Ian Tomlinson (athlete) =

Australian triple and long jumper (1936–1995)

Personal information
- Nationality: Australian
- Born: 27 February 1936 Perth, Australia
- Died: 26 January 1995 (aged 58) Melbourne, Australia
- Height: 187 cm (6 ft 2 in)
- Weight: 70 kg (154 lb)

Sport
- Sport: Athletics
- Event: long jump/triple jump
- Club: Old Melburnians
Medal record
Men's Athletics
Representing Australia
British Empire and Commonwealth Games
Gold medal – first place	1958 Cardiff	Triple Jump
Gold medal – first place	1962 Perth	Triple Jump

Ian Ross Tomlinson (27 February 1936 – 26 January 1995) was an Olympic athlete from Australia, who competed at two consecutive Olympic Games.

== Biography ==
Born in Perth, Western Australia Tomlinson represented Australia and specialised in the triple jump and long jump events during his career.

Tomlinson finished second behind Dave Norris in the triple jump event at the 1958 AAA Championships and shortly afterwards he claimed the gold medal in the men's triple jump event at the 1958 British Empire and Commonwealth Games for his native country. At the 1960 Olympic Games in Rome, he represented Australia in both of the jump events.

Tomlinson won another gold medal when he represented the Australian team at the 1962 British Empire and Commonwealth Games in Perth, Western Australia, in the men's triple jump event. At the 1964 Olympic Games in Tokyo, he represented Australia again in both jump events.

Tomlinson died in Melbourne, Victoria, aged 58.
