= Mikhail Bariban =

Russian triple jumper

Personal information
- Born: 25 February 1949 Krasnodar, Soviet Union
- Died: 8 August 2016 (aged 67) Krasnodar, Russia

Sport
- Sport: Track and field
Medal record
Representing Soviet Union
European Indoor Championships
| Silver medal – second place | 1974 Gothenburg | Triple jump |
| Bronze medal – third place | 1973 Rotterdam | Triple jump |
Summer Universiade
| Gold medal – first place | 1973 Moscow | Triple jump |

Mikhail Mikhailovich Bariban (Russian: Михаил Михайлович Барибан; 25 February 1949 – 8 August 2016) was a Russian triple jumper who represented the USSR. Bariban trained at Dynamo in Krasnodar. He won two medals at the European Indoor Championships as well as a gold medal at the 1973 Summer Universiade.

In 2006, Bariban was the director of the Children and Youth Sport School N2 in Krasnodar.

== Achievements ==
| Year | Tournament | Venue | Result | Extra |
|---|---|---|---|---|
| 1972 | Olympic Games | Munich, West Germany | 9th | |
| 1973 | European Indoor Championships | Rotterdam, Netherlands | 3rd | |
| | Universiade | Moscow, USSR | 1st | |
| 1974 | European Indoor Championships | Gothenburg, Sweden | 2nd | |
