= Pavel Sasín =

Czechoslovak triple jumper

Pavel Sasín (born 27 March 1950) is a retired Czechoslovak triple jumper.

He finished sixth at the 1976 European Indoor Championships. He became Czechoslovak champion in 1975; and Czechoslovak indoor champion in 1976.
