= Toshiaki Inoue =

Japanese triple jumper (1951–1993)

Personal information
- Nationality: Japanese
- Born: 3 January 1951
- Died: 28 February 1993 (aged 42)
- Height: 174 cm (5 ft 9 in)
- Weight: 65 kg (143 lb)

Sport
- Sport: Athletics
- Event: triple jump
Medal record
Representing Japan
Asian Games
Gold medal – first place	1974 Tehran	Triple jump

Toshiaki Inoue (井上 敏明, Inoue Toshiaki; 3 January 1951 – 28 February 1993) was a Japanese triple jumper who competed in the 1972 Summer Olympics and in the 1976 Summer Olympics.

Inoue won the British AAA Championships titlein the triple jump event at the British 1974 AAA Championships.
