= Andrzej Lasocki =

Polish triple jumper

Andrzej Ryszard Lasocki (born 5 October 1945) is a retired Polish triple jumper.

He was born in Warsaw and represented the club MKS Warszawa and Skra Warszawa. He finished ninth at the 1972 European Indoor Championships, and also competed at the 1969 European Championships.

His best result at the Polish Championships was a silver medal, achieved in 1972. His personal best jump was 16.55 metres, achieved in 1970 in Warsaw.
