= Günter Krivec =

German triple jumper

Personal information
- Nationality: German
- Born: 28 July 1942 (age 84) Moers, West Germany

Sport
- Sport: Athletics
- Event: Triple jump

Günter Krivec (born 28 July 1942) is a German athlete. He competed in the men's triple jump at the 1964 Summer Olympics.
