= Valentyn Shevchenko =

Ukrainian triple jumper

Personal information
- Nationality: Ukrainian
- Born: 5 June 1948 (age 78)

Sport
- Sport: Athletics
- Event: Triple jump
Medal record
Men's athletics
Representing Soviet Union
European Indoor Championships
Bronze medal – third place	1972 Grenoble	Triple jump

Valentyn Shevchenko (born 5 June 1948) is a Ukrainian athlete. He competed in the men's triple jump at the 1976 Summer Olympics, representing the Soviet Union.
