= Hans-Jürgen Rückborn =

German triple jumper

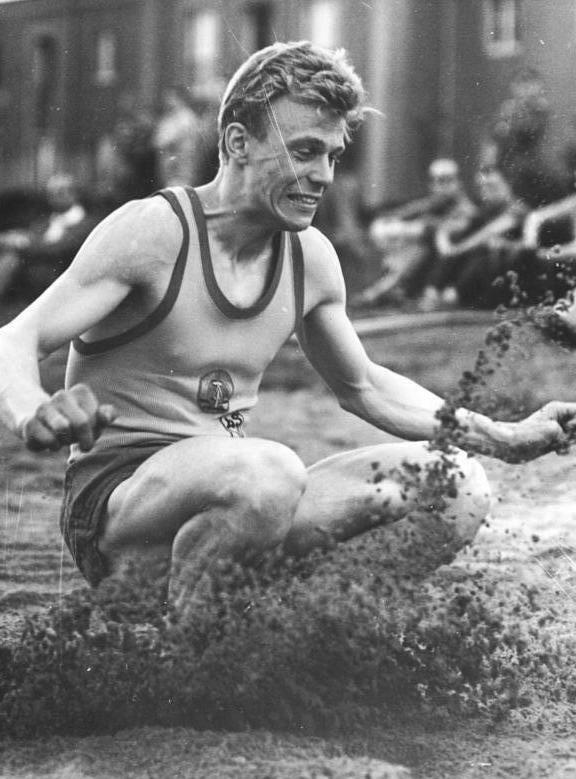
- Hans-Jürgen Rückborn in 1963

Personal information
- Nationality: German
- Born: 8 October 1940 (age 85) Stendal, Germany

Sport
- Sport: Athletics
- Event: Triple jump
Medal record
Men's athletics
Representing East Germany
European Championships
Silver medal – second place	1966 Budapest	Triple jump

Hans-Jürgen Rückborn (born 8 October 1940) is a German athlete. He competed in the men's triple jump at the 1964 Summer Olympics.
