= Aleksandr Zolotarev (athlete) =

Soviet triple jumper

Personal information
- Nationality: Soviet
- Born: 13 March 1940 (age 86) Stalingrad, Russian SFSR, Soviet Union

Sport
- Sport: Athletics
- Event: Triple jump
Medal record
Representing Soviet Union
European Indoor Championships
Bronze medal – third place	1967 Prague	Triple jump
Summer Universiade
Silver medal – second place	1963 Porto Alegre	Triple jump

Aleksandr Aleksandrovich Zolotarev (born 13 March 1940) is a Soviet athlete. He competed in the men's triple jump at the 1968 Summer Olympics.
