= Peter Reed (athlete) =

British long jumper

Personal information
- Nationality: British
- Born: 21 September 1943 (age 82) London, England
- Height: 183 cm (6 ft 0 in)
- Weight: 73 kg (161 lb)

Sport
- Sport: Athletics
- Event: Long jump
- Club: Hercules Wimbledon AC

Peter Neville Reed (born 21 September 1943) is a British former athlete who competed at the 1968 Summer Olympics.

== Biography ==
Reed attended Emanuel School in London. He studied at the University of London, then the University of Leicester around 1967 and was a chemistry teacher at local grammar school, in 1968, at the time of the Summer Olympics.

Reed finished third behind Lynn Davies in the long jump event at the 1968 AAA Championships. At the 1968 Olympic Games in Mexico City, he represented Great Britain in the men's long jump competition.
