= Dragán Ivanov =

Hungarian triple jumper

Personal information
- Nationality: Hungarian
- Born: 27 January 1942 (age 84) Orosháza, Hungary

Sport
- Sport: Athletics
- Event: Triple jump
Medal record
Representing Hungary
Summer Universiade
Silver medal – second place	1965 Budapest	Triple jump

Dragán Ivanov (born 27 January 1942) is a Hungarian athlete. He competed in the men's triple jump at the 1968 Summer Olympics.
