= Pertti Pousi =

Finnish long jumper (born 1946)

Personal information
- Nationality: Finnish
- Born: 24 June 1946 (age 80) Helsinki, Finland
- Height: 185 cm (6 ft 1 in)
- Weight: 63 kg (139 lb)

Sport
- Sport: Athletics
- Events: Long jump Triple jump
- Club: HKV, Helsinki; BYU Cougars
Medal record
Representing Finland
Summer Universiade
Silver medal – second place	1967 Tokyo	Triple jump
Bronze medal – third place	1967 Tokyo	Long jump

Pertti Juhani Pousi (born 24 June 1946) is a Finnish athlete who competed at the 1968 Summer Olympics.

== Biography ==
Pousi finished third behind Józef Szmidt in the triple jump event at the British 1966 AAA Championships.

At the 1968 Olympic Games in Mexico City, Pousi competed in the men's long jump and the men's triple jump.

Representing the BYU Cougars track and field team, Pousi won the 1968 NCAA Division I Outdoor Track and Field Championships in the long jump. He also won the 1969 NCAA Division I Outdoor Track and Field Championships in the triple jump.
