= Andrzej Sontag =

Polish triple jumper

Personal information
- Born: 26 April 1952 (age 74) Lublin, Poland

Sport
- Sport: Track and field
Medal record
Representing Poland
European Championships
Bronze medal – third place	1974 Rome	Triple jump

Andrzej Sontag (born 26 April 1952) is a retired triple jumper from Poland.

He was born in Lublin and represented the club AZS Lublin. He won a bronze medal at the 1974 European Championships, and finished eighth at the 1976 European Indoor Championships. He competed at the 1976 Olympic Games without reaching the final.

He became Polish indoor champion in 1976. His personal best jump was 16.96 metres, achieved in 1975.

He is now Director of the Łódź Region for the Polish Department of Culture, Education and Sport.
