= Václav Fišer =

Czech long and triple jumper

Václav Fišer (born 9 July 1947) is a Czech retired long jumper and triple jumper who represented Czechoslovakia.

He was born in Klatovy and represented the club Dukla Prague. He finished fifth at the 1971 European Championships, tenth at the 1972 European Indoor Championships, and competed at the 1972 Olympic Games without reaching the final.

He became Czechoslovak champion in long jump in 1970 and Czechoslovak champion in triple jump in 1971 and Czechoslovak indoor champion in 1972. His personal best jump was 16.62 metres, achieved in 1972.
