= Heinz-Günter Schenk =

German triple jumper

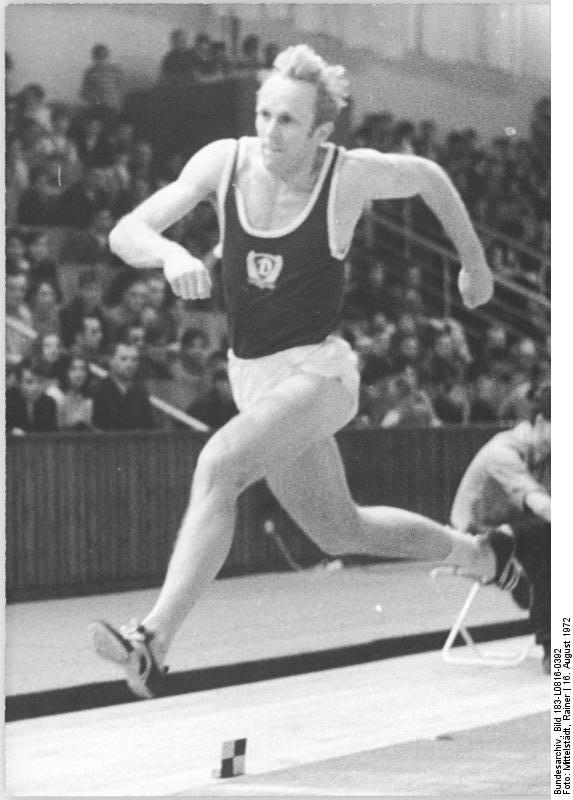

Personal information
- Nationality: German
- Born: 16 January 1942 (age 83)

Sport
- Sport: Athletics
- Event: Triple jump
- Club: SC Dynamo Berlin

Heinz-Günter Schenk (born 16 January 1942) is a German athlete. He competed in the men's triple jump at the 1968 Summer Olympics and the 1972 Summer Olympics.
