= Gennady Bessonov (athlete) =

Russian triple jumper

Personal information
- Born: 10 December 1944 (age 81) Shchyolkovo, Moscow Oblast, Russia
- Height: 176 cm (5 ft 9 in)
- Weight: 67 kg (148 lb)

Sport
- Sport: Athletics
- Event: Triple jump

Achievements and titles
- Personal best: 16.82 m (1972)
Medal record
Men's athletics
Representing Soviet Union
European Indoor Championships
Bronze medal – third place	1975 Katowice	Triple jump

Gennady Petrovich Bessonov (Russian: Геннадий Петрович Бессонов, born 10 December 1944) is a retired Russian triple jumper. He competed at the 1972 Summer Olympics and placed 15th.
