= Derek Boosey =

British triple jumper

Personal information
- Nationality: British (English)
- Born: 15 July 1942 (age 84) Pune, British India
- Height: 183 cm (6 ft 0 in)
- Weight: 75 kg (165 lb)

Sport
- Sport: Athletics
- Event: Triple jump
- Club: Belgrave Harriers

Derek Charles Joseph Boosey (born 15 July 1942) is a British athlete who competed at the 1968 Summer Olympics.

== Biography ==
Boosey finished third behind Fred Alsop in the triple jump event at the 1964 AAA Championships. Later that year at the 1964 Olympic Games in Tokyo, he represented Great Britain in the men's triple jump competition.

Boosey would finish on the podium three more times at the AAA Championships at the 1967 AAA Championships, 1969 AAA Championships and 1970 AAA Championships.
