= Viktor Saneyev =

Georgian triple jumper (1945–2022)

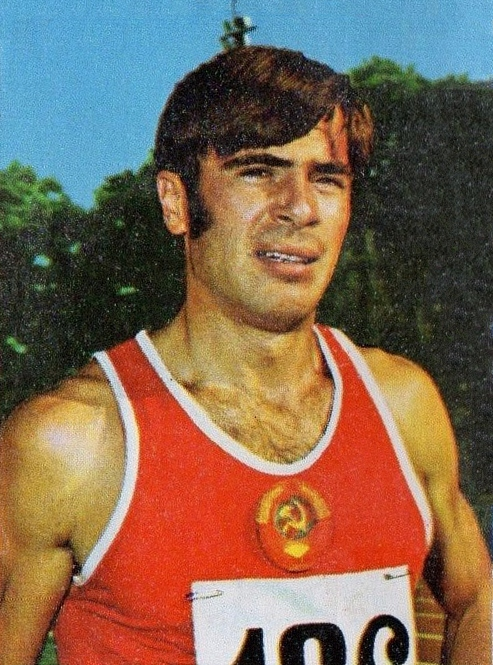
- Saneyev c. 1972

Personal information
- Full name: Viktor Danilovich Saneyev; Виктор Данилович Санеев ვიქტორ სანეევი
- Nationality: Georgian
- Born: 3 October 1945 Sukhumi, Georgian SSR, Soviet Union
- Died: 3 January 2022 (aged 76) Sydney, New South Wales, Australia
- Height: 188 cm (6 ft 2 in)
- Weight: 78 kg (172 lb)
- Spouse: Tatiana "Yana" Khvartskaia

Sport
- Country: Soviet Union
- Sport: Athletics
- Event: Triple jump
- Club: Dynamo Sukhumi; Dinamo Tbilisi

Achievements and titles
- Personal best: 17.44 m (1972)
Medal record
Men's athletics
Representing Soviet Union
Olympic Games
Gold medal – first place	1968 Mexico City	Triple jump
Gold medal – first place	1972 Munich	Triple jump
Gold medal – first place	1976 Montreal	Triple jump
Silver medal – second place	1980 Moscow	Triple jump
European Championships
Gold medal – first place	1969 Athens	Triple jump
Gold medal – first place	1974 Rome	Triple jump
Silver medal – second place	1971 Helsinki	Triple jump
Silver medal – second place	1978 Prague	Triple jump
European Indoor Championships
Gold medal – first place	1970 Vienna	Triple jump
Gold medal – first place	1971 Sofia	Triple jump
Gold medal – first place	1972 Grenoble	Triple jump
Gold medal – first place	1975 Katowice	Triple jump
Gold medal – first place	1976 Munich	Triple jump
Gold medal – first place	1977 San Sebastián	Triple jump
Summer Universiade
Gold medal – first place	1970 Turin	Triple jump
Silver medal – second place	1973 Moscow	Triple jump

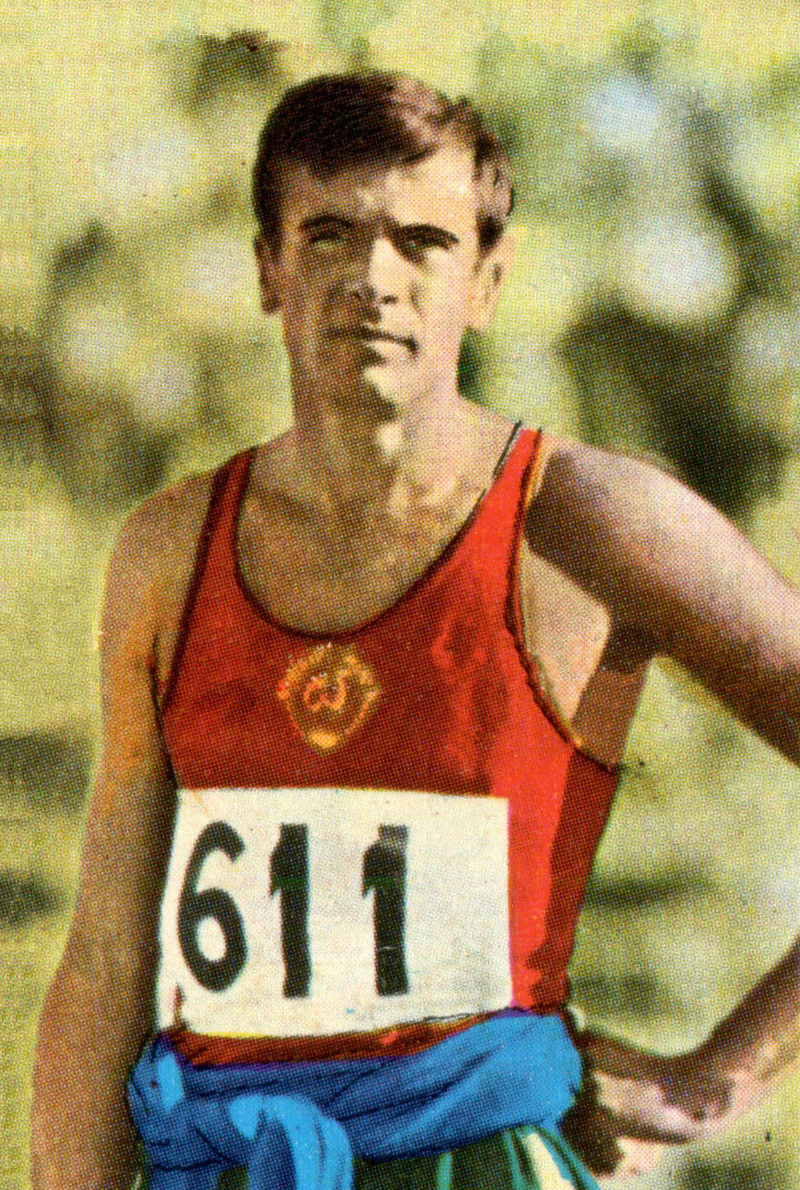
Saneyev c. 1968

Viktor Danilovich Saneyev (Russian: Виктор Данилович Санеев; Georgian: ვიქტორ სანეევი; 3 October 1945 – 3 January 2022) was a Georgian triple jumper who competed internationally for the USSR. He won four Olympic medals – three golds (1968, 1972 and 1976) and one silver (1980). Saneyev set the world record on three occasions. He was born in Sukhumi, Georgian SSR, trained in Sukhumi and Tbilisi, and died in Sydney.

== Athletics career ==
Saneyev was born into a poor family in 1945, with a disabled and paralyzed father who died when Saneyev was 15 years old. He took up athletics in 1956, training in the high jump at the Gantiadi boarding school; his first coach was Akop Kerselyan. Six years later Kerselyan advised him to specialize in the triple jump. In 1963 Saneyev finished third in his first All-Union competition – Schoolchildren's Spartakiad.

His first major success came in 1968, when he won both the USSR Championships and the 1968 Summer Olympics, where on 17 October he set the World Record twice, 17.23 m and 17.39 m. On the same date four years later, in Sukhumi, Saneyev improved the World Record to 17.44 m. He won gold medals at the 1972 Summer Olympics and at the 1976 Summer Olympics and a silver at the 1980 Summer Olympics.

He also won the 1969 and 1974 European Championships, the 1970, 1971, 1972, 1975, 1976 and 1977 European Athletics Indoor Championships. Saneyev was USSR champion in 1968–71, 1973–75 and 1978.

=== 1980 Olympics ===
Saneyev came to the 1980 Olympics hoping for a fourth gold medal, though he understood that several jumpers had better chances for a gold, especially the world record holder João Carlos de Oliveira of Brazil. Estonian Jaak Uudmäe won the gold medal (17.35 m), followed by Saneyev (17.24 m) and Oliveira (17.22 m). The event was marred by controversial judging. Five out of seven jumps by Australia's Ian Campbell were discarded, as well as four jumps by De Oliveira; Uudmäe had two fouls and Saneyev one. All IAAF inspectors were pulled out of the field on the day of the triple jump final and replaced by Soviet staff.

Both Campbell and De Oliveira jumped beyond Uudmäe's leading mark more than once, but all of these jumps were discarded despite protests. The longest of Campbell's jumps was ruled a "scrape" foul: the officials claimed his trailing leg had touched the track during the step phase, though it was unlikely to scrape and jump that far. Saneyev did not contest his foul, though it also fell on his strongest jump. He later noted that the winning jump by Uudmäe was likely overstepped. Saneyev retired after the 1980 Olympics. In retirement, he headed the USSR jumping team for four years, and later worked at his formative club, Dynamo Tbilisi.

== Later life and death ==
In the early 1990s, after the Soviet Union broke up and a civil war started in Georgia, Saneyev lost his job and moved to Australia with his wife and 15-year-old son. His brief coaching contract soon expired, and Saneyev was about to sell his Olympic medals to feed his family. He reconsidered at the last moment and took odd jobs instead, such as pizza delivery. He found a regular job as a physical education teacher at St Joseph's College, Hunters Hill, and later as the jumping coach at the New South Wales Institute of Sport.

Saneyev had graduated from the Georgian State University of Subtropical Agriculture and Tbilisi State University, and enjoyed growing subtropical plants in his backyard, including lemons and grapefruits. He died on 3 January 2022, at the age of 76.

== Honors ==
- Order of the Red Banner of Labour in 1969
- Order of Lenin in 1972
- Order of Friendship of Peoples in 1976.
- Vakhtang Gorgasali Order, 1st and 2nd Degree
- International Association of Athletics Federations (IAAF) Silver Medal (2005)
- Honorary Citizen of Tbilisi
- Order of Merit and the Presidential Order of Excellence (2018)
- Order of the International Olympic Committee

At the 1980 Games he was selected as an Olympic torch bearer, though this honor is usually given to retired athletes.

Records
Preceded by Giuseppe Gentile; Nelson Prudêncio; Pedro Pérez	Men's triple jump world record holder 1968-10-17; 1968-10-17 – 1971-08-05; 1972-10-17 – 1975-10-15	Succeeded by Nelson Prudêncio; Pedro Pérez; João Carlos de Oliveira
