= Yukito Muraki =

Japanese triple jumper

Personal information
- Nationality: Japanese
- Born: 31 July 1945 (age 81) Seoul, South Korea
- Height: 173 cm (5 ft 8 in)
- Weight: 67 kg (148 lb)

Sport
- Sport: Athletics
- Event: Triple jump

Yukito Muraki (村木 征人, Muraki Yukito; born 31 July 1945) is a Japanese track and field athlete. He competed in the men's triple jump at the 1968 Summer Olympics and the 1972 Summer Olympics. He later became a professor of sports science at the University of Tsukuba and Hosei University.

Muraki won the British AAA Championships title in the triple jump event at the 1970 AAA Championships.
