= Bernard Lamitié =

French triple jumper (born 1946)

Personal information
- Born: 27 June 1946 (age 80) Paris, France
- Height: 180 cm (5 ft 11 in)
- Weight: 76 kg (168 lb)

Sport
- Country: France
- Sport: Athletics
- Event: Triple jump
Medal record
Men's athletics
Representing France
European Indoor Championships
Bronze medal – third place	1974 Gothenburg	Triple jump
Bronze medal – third place	1976 Munich	Triple jump
Bronze medal – third place	1977 San Sebastián	Triple jump

Bernard Lamitié (born 27 June 1946 in Paris) is a French former triple jumper and Olympian who won three bronze medals at the European Indoor Championships.

== Achievements ==
Year	Tournament	Venue	Result	Extra
1972	Olympic Games	Munich, West Germany	10th	
1974	European Indoor Championships	Gothenburg, Sweden	3rd	
1975	Mediterranean Games	Algiers, Algeria	1st	
1976	European Indoor Championships	Munich, West Germany	3rd	
	Olympic Games	Montreal, Canada	11th	
1977	European Indoor Championships	San Sebastián, Spain	3rd	
1978	European Championships	Prague, Czechoslovakia	4th	
1979	Mediterranean Games	Split, Yugoslavia	1st	16.90m CR
