= Kristen Fløgstad =

Norwegian long and triple jumper

Kristen Fløgstad (born 11 April 1947) is a former Norwegian athlete from Søgne Municipality in Vest-Agder. He represented Kristiansands IF.

He won the national championships in triple jump ten times (1968, 1970–71, 1973–76, 1979–80 and 1982) and in long jump six times (1967–68, 1973 and 1975–77), being awarded the King's Cup (kongepokal) once. His personal best result in long jump, 8.02 metres achieved on Bislett stadion on 4 August 1973, is still the Norwegian record.

Fløgstad competed at the 1972 Summer Olympics, finishing 8th in the triple jump contest.
