= Șerban Ciochină =

Romanian triple jumper (1939–2023)

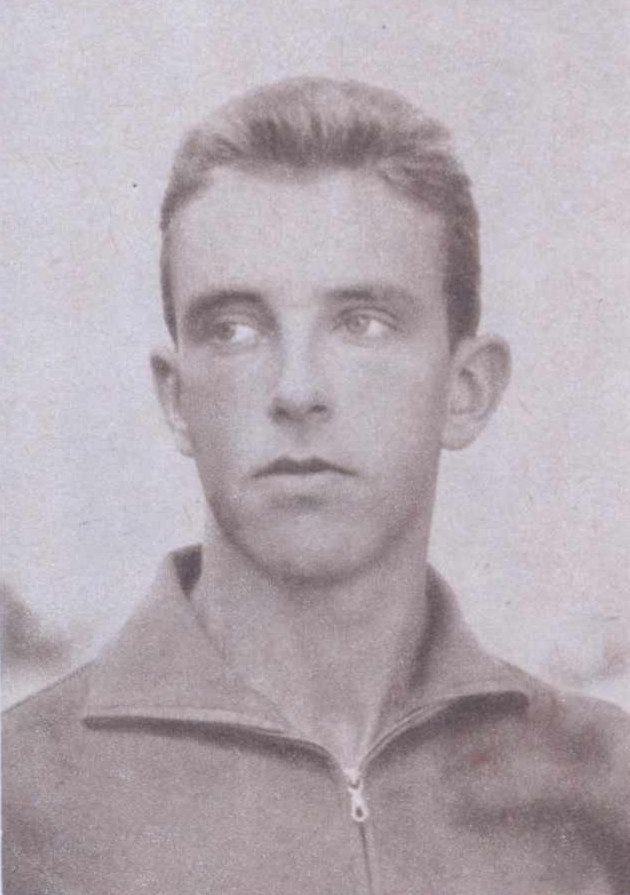

Personal information
- Nationality: Romanian
- Born: 30 November 1939 Bucharest, Romania
- Died: April 2023 (aged 83)
- Height: 178 cm (5 ft 10 in)
- Weight: 65 kg (143 lb)

Sport
- Sport: Athletics
- Event: triple jump
Medal record
Men's athletics
Representing Romania
European Indoor Championships
Bronze medal – third place	1970 Vienna	Triple jump

Șerban Ciochină (30 November 1939 – April 2023) was a Romanian triple jump athlete who competed at two Olympic Games.

== Biography ==
Ciochină achieved fifth place at the 1964 Olympic Games in Tokyo, in the men's triple jump competition. He was also European Champion in Dortmund, Germany in 1966.

He won the Romanian triple jump championship six years in a row from 1963 to 1968 and also won the British AAA Championships title at the 1968 AAA Championships.

At the 1968 Olympic Games in Mexico City, he represented Romania in the triple jump again.

Ciochină died in April 2023, at the age of 83.

== Sources ==
- Şerban Ciochină
