= Georgi Stoykovski =

Bulgarian triple jumper (1941–2023)

Personal information
- Full name: Georgi Ivanov Stoykovski
- Born: 10 May 1941 Bata, Pazardzhik Province, Bulgaria
- Died: 4 May 2023 (aged 81)
Medal record
Men's athletics
Representing Bulgaria
European Championships
Gold medal – first place	1966 Budapest	Triple jump

Georgi Ivanov Stoykovski (Bulgarian: Георги Иванов Стойковски; 10 May 1941 – 4 May 2023) was a Bulgarian triple jumper who competed in the 1964 Summer Olympics and in the 1968 Summer Olympics.

Stoykovski died on 4 May 2023, at the age of 81.
