= Jörg Drehmel =

East German triple jumper

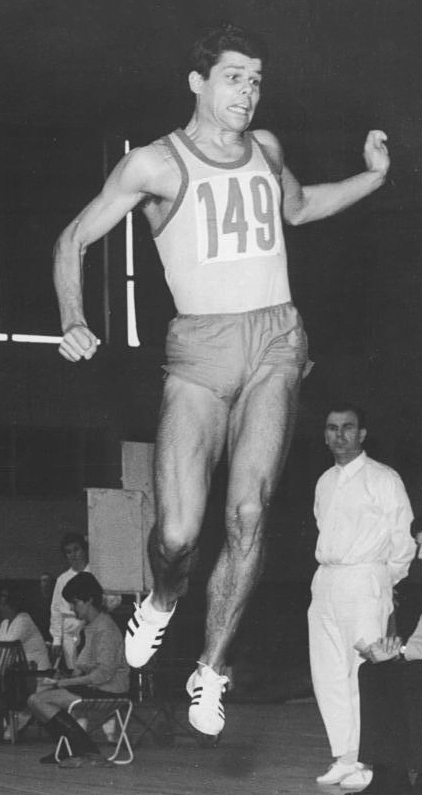
- Jörg Drehmel in 1970

Personal information
- Born: 3 May 1945 Trantow, Germany
- Died: May 2026 (aged 80–81)
- Height: 187 cm (6 ft 2 in)
- Weight: 83 kg (183 lb)

Sport
- Sport: Athletics
- Event: Triple jump
- Club: ASK Vorwärts Potsdam
- Coached by: Heinz Rieger

Achievements and titles
- Personal best: 17.31 (1972)
Medal record
Men's athletics
Representing East Germany
Olympic Games
Silver medal – second place	1972 Munich	Triple jump
European Championships
Gold medal – first place	1971 Helsinki	Triple jump
European Indoor Championships
Silver medal – second place	1970 Vienna	Triple jump
Summer Universiade
Bronze medal – third place	1970 Turin	Triple jump
Bronze medal – third place	1973 Moscow	Triple jump

Jörg Drehmel (3 May 1945 – May 2026) was an East German triple jumper who won a silver medal at the 1972 Olympics. He was the European champion in 1971.

== Sports career ==
Drehmel first tried his hand at the javelin throw and the decathlon before switching to the triple jump in 1966. His first big success came with a win at the European Cup in 1970, where he was the first German jumper to set a record with the first-ever jump over 17 meters. His jump of 17.16 meters to win the European Championship in 1971 did not qualify as a record due to excessive tail wind.

== Background ==
Drehmel had a degree in electronics and was an officer in the National People's Army. At the end of his career in 1977 he became a youth coach for long and triple jump athletes. At the demise of the GDR he lost this position, and later joined the state sports association in the state of Brandenburg. At present he is the honorary jumping coach at SC Potsdam. He resides in Stahnsdorf near Potsdam.
