= Nikolay Dudkin =

Belarusian triple jumper

Personal information
- Nationality: Belarusian
- Born: 5 July 1947 (age 79) Minsk, Soviet Union

Sport
- Sport: Athletics
- Event: Triple jump
Medal record
Representing Soviet Union
European Indoor Championships
| Gold medal – first place | 1968 Madrid | Triple jump |
| Gold medal – first place | 1969 Belgrade | Triple jump |
Summer Universiade
| Silver medal – second place | 1970 Turin | Triple jump |

Nikolay Dudkin (born 5 July 1947) is a Belarusian athlete. He competed in the men's triple jump at the 1968 Summer Olympics, representing the Soviet Union.
