= Giuseppe Gentile =

Italian triple jumper (born 1943)

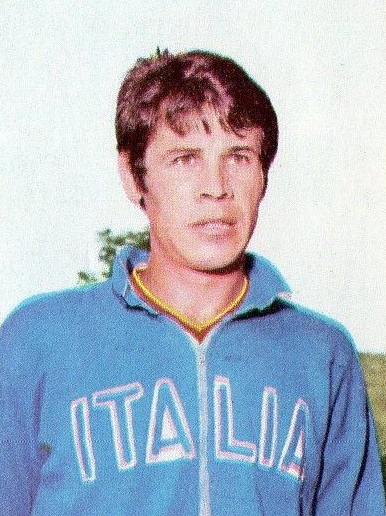
- Gentile in 1968

Personal information
- Nationality: Italian
- Born: 4 September 1943 (age 82) Latina, Italy
- Height: 1.90 m (6 ft 3 in)
- Weight: 83 kg (183 lb)

Sport
- Country: Italy
- Sport: Athletics
- Event: Triple jump
- Club: G.S. Fiamme Oro

Achievements and titles
- Personal bests: Triple jump: 17.22 m (1968); Long jump: 7.91 m (1968)
Medal record
Olympic Games
Bronze medal – third place	1968 Mexico City	Triple jump
Summer Universiade
Bronze medal – third place	1967 Tokyo	Triple jump
Mediterranean Games
Silver medal – second place	1963 Naples	Triple jump
Silver medal – second place	1967 Tunis	Triple jump

Giuseppe Gentile (born 4 September 1943) is a retired Italian triple jumper, who won a bronze medal at the 1968 Summer Olympics.

== Biography ==
From 1962 to 1972 Gentile took part in 33 international competitions, including the 1968 and 1972 Summer Olympics. He won four international medals and six national titles: in the long jump (1968) and triple jump (1965, 1966, 1968, 1970, 1971). After finishing his sporting career, Gentile turned to acting. He appeared opposite Maria Callas in Medea by Pier Paolo Pasolini, in the role of Jason.

== World records ==
- Triple jump: 17.10 m ( Mexico City, 16 October 1968)
- Triple jump: 17.22 m ( Mexico City, 17 October 1968)

== Achievements ==
Year	Tournament	Venue	Result	Measure	Notes
1963	Mediterranean Games	Naples, Italy	2nd	15.50 m	
1967	Mediterranean Games	Tunis, Tunisia	2nd	16.04 m	
1967	Universiade	Tokyo, Japan	3rd	15.84 m	
1968	Olympic Games	Mexico City, Mexico	3rd	17.22 m	(Note: New world record at the moment of the jump.) (Note: He set also the world record in qualifying with the measure of 17.10 m.)
1972	Olympic Games	Munich, West Germany	16th	16.04 m	

== See also ==
- Italian all-time lists – Triple jump
- FIDAL Hall of Fame
- Triple jump world record progression
- Men's long jump Italian record progression

== Notes ==
Records
Preceded by (Poland) Jozef Szmidt	Men's Triple Jump World Record Holder; 1968-10-16 – 1968-10-17	Succeeded by (Soviet Union) Viktor Sanyeyev
