= List of Hungarian Athletics Championships champions (men) =

This is a list of men's Hungarian athletics champions. The Hungarian Athletics Championships (Hungarian: Atlétikai Magyar Bajnokság, OB I) are held in an outdoor athletic field. The national championships are also trials for the Summer Olympics, World Championships and European Championships.

== Champions ==
=== 100 metres ===
100 yards

- 1896: Alajos Szokolyi, MAC
- 1897: Pál Koppán, MUE
- 1898: István Záborszky, MAC
- 1899: Ernő Schubert, MUE
- 1900: Ernő Schubert (2), MUE
- 1901: Pál Koppán (2), MAC
- 1902: Miksa Hellmich, OTE
- 1903: Béla Mező, MAC
- 1904: Béla Mező (2), MAC
- 1905: Zoltán Bertalan, MAC
- 1906: Miksa Hellmich (2), OTE
- 1907: Miksa Hellmich (3), OTE
- 1908: Pál Simon, MAC
- 1909: Pál Simon (2), MAC
- 1910: Vilmos Rácz, BEAC
- 1911: István Jankovich, MAC
- 1912: István Jankovich (2), MAC
- 1913: Pál Szalay, MTK
- 1914: József Szenes, MTK

100 metres

- 1915: József Szenes (2), MTK
- 1916: Géza Krepuska, MAC
- 1917: Lajos Korunczy, TSE
- 1918: Géza Krepuska (2), MAC
- 1919: Géza Krepuska (3), MAC
- 1920: Géza Krepuska (4), MAC
- 1921: Ferenc Gerő, KAOE
- 1922: Ferenc Gerő (2), KAOE
- 1923: Ferenc Gerő (3), KAOE
- 1924: Ferenc Gerő (4), KAOE
- 1925: István Raggambi-Fluck, BBTE
- 1926: István Raggambi-Fluck (2), BBTE
- 1927: Bruno Malitz, Germany
- 1928: Ferenc Gerő (5), KAOE
- 1929: István Raggambi-Fluck (3), BBTE
- 1930: István Sugár, UTE
- 1931: Gyula Gyenes, MTK
- 1932: Gábor Gerő, MTK
- 1933: László Forgács, UTE
- 1934: József Sir, BBTE
- 1935: József Sir (2), BBTE
- 1936: Gyula Gyenes, MAC
- 1937: Gyula Gyenes (2), MAC
- 1938: Gyula Gyenes (3), MAC
- 1939: József Sir (3), BBTE
- 1940: Ferenc Szigetvári, PEAC
- 1941: György Csányi, UTE
- 1942: Ferenc Tima, KEAC
- 1943: Pál Pelsőczy, MAC
- 1944: Ferenc Bánhalmi, MRTSE
- 1945: György Csányi (2), UTE
- 1946: Ferenc Tima (2), SzEAC
- 1947: Béla Goldoványi, MAFC
- 1948: György Csányi (3), UTE
- 1949: György Csányi (4), UTE
- 1950: Ottó Szebeni, Textiles
- 1951: Géza Varasdi, Budapest
- 1952: Béla Goldoványi, Dózsa SE
- 1953: Béla Goldoványi (2), Budapest
- 1954: Béla Goldoványi (3), Dózsa SE
- 1955: Béla Goldoványi (4), Bp. Építők
- 1956: Géza Varasdi (2), Csepeli Vasas
- 1957: Sándor Jakabfy, BEAC
- 1958: Béla Goldoványi (5), Bp. Építők
- 1959: László Kiss, Tatabányai Bányász
- 1960: László Kiss (2), Tatabányai Bányász
- 1961: Csaba Csutorás, Bp. Honvéd
- 1962: Csaba Csutorás (2), Bp. Honvéd
- 1963: Csaba Csutorás (3), Bp. Honvéd
- 1964: Csaba Csutorás (4), Bp. Honvéd
- 1965: Huba Rozsnyai, MAFC
- 1966: László Mihályfi, BEAC
- 1967: László Mihályfi (2), BEAC
- 1968: Tibor Farkas, Bp. Honvéd
- 1969: László Mihályfi, BEAC
- 1970: Tibor Farkas, Bp. Honvéd
- 1971: Tibor Farkas (2), Bp. Honvéd
- 1972: István Bátori, Ú. Dózsa
- 1973: Lajos Gresa, GEAC
- 1974: Tibor Farkas (3), Bp. Honvéd
- 1975: Endre Lépold, PMSC
- 1976: Lajos Gresa (2), FTC
- 1977: Lajos Gresa (3), FTC
- 1978: István Nagy, Hevesi SE
- 1979: István Csatár, Bp. Honvéd
- 1980: Ferenc Kiss, Csepel
- 1981: Attila Kovács, Szekszárdi Dózsa
- 1982: István Nagy (2), Hevesi SE
- 1983: Ferenc Kiss (2), Csepel
- 1984: Attila Kovács (2), Ú. Dózsa
- 1985: Attila Kovács (3), Ú. Dózsa
- 1986: Attila Kovács (4), Ú. Dózsa
- 1987: Attila Kovács (5), Ú. Dózsa
- 1988: Attila Kovács (6), Ú. Dózsa
- 1989: Attila Kovács (7), Ú. Dózsa
- 1990: Attila Kovács (8), Ú. Dózsa
- 1991: Attila Kovács (9), Ú. Dózsa
- 1992: Attila Kovács (10), Ú. Dózsa
- 1993: Pál Rezák, UTE
- 1994: Attila Kovács (11), UTE
- 1995: Pál Rezák (2), UTE
- 1996: Szabolcs Alex, Vaker
- 1997: Gábor Dobos, Bp. Honvéd
- 1998: Gábor Dobos (2), Bp. Honvéd
- 1999: Gábor Dobos (3), Bp. Honvéd
- 2000: Gábor Dobos (4), Bp. Honvéd
- 2001: Viktor Kovács, Szolnoki MÁV
- 2002: Roland Németh, Soproni AC
- 2003: Gábor Dobos (5), Bp. Honvéd
- 2004: Géza Pauer, Bp. Honvéd
- 2005: Gábor Dobos (6), Bp. Honvéd
- 2006: Roland Németh (2), Soproni AC
- 2007: Roland Németh (3), FTC
- 2008: Gergely Németh, FTC
- 2009: Péter Miklós, Bp. Honvéd
- 2010: Dániel Karlik, KSI
- 2011: Dániel Karlik (2), KSI
- 2012: Miklós Szebeny, Vasas
- 2013: Roland Németh (4), MAC-Népstadion
- 2014: Dániel Karlik (3), GEAC
- 2015: Dániel Szabó, ARAK
- 2016: János Sipos, Szolnoki MÁV
- 2017: Dániel Szabó (2), ARAK
- 2018: Dániel Szabó (3), ARAK
- 2019: Dániel Szabó (4), ARAK

=== 200 metres ===
220 yards

- 1908: Pál Simon, MAC
- 1909: Pál Simon (2), MAC
- 1910: Frigyes Mezei, BEAC
- 1911: István Jankovich, MAC
- 1912: István Jankovich (2), MAC
- 1913: Pál Szalay, MTK
- 1914: Ervin Szerelemhegyi, MAC

200 metres

- 1915: Ervin Szerelemhegyi (2), MAC
- 1916: Géza Krepuska, MAC
- 1917: Lajos Korunczy, TSE
- 1918: Géza Krepuska (2), MAC
- 1919: Géza Krepuska (3), MAC
- 1920: Géza Krepuska (4), MAC
- 1921: Lajos Korunczy (2), MTK
- 1922: Ferenc Gerő, KAOE
- 1923: Ferenc Gerő (2), KAOE
- 1924: Ferenc Gerő (3), KAOE
- 1925: Gusztáv Rózsahegyi, MAC
- 1926: Sándor Hajdú, FTC
- 1927: Bruno Malitz, Germany
- 1928: Ferenc Gerő (4), KAOE
- 1929: István Raggambi-Fluck, BBTE
- 1930: István Raggambi-Fluck (2), BBTE
- 1931: Gábor Gerő, MTK
- 1932: István Raggambi-Fluck (3), BBTE
- 1933: Gábor Gerő (2), MTK
- 1934: József Sir, BBTE
- 1935: József Sir (2), BBTE
- 1936: Gyula Gyenes, MAC
- 1937: Gyula Gyenes (2), MAC
- 1938: Gyula Gyenes (3), MAC
- 1939: József Sir (3), BBTE
- 1940: Gyula Gyenes (4), MAC
- 1941: György Csányi, UTE
- 1942: Gyula Gyenes (5), MAC
- 1943: Pál Pelsőczy, MAC
- 1944: László Ónody, Testvériség
- 1945: György Csányi (2), UTE
- 1946: Ferenc Tima, SZEAC
- 1947: Béla Goldoványi, MAFC
- 1948: Egon Solymosi, PVSK
- 1949: György Csányi (3), UTE
- 1950: Ottó Szebeni, Textiles
- 1951: Zoltán Adamik, Budapest
- 1952: Béla Goldoványi (2), Dózsa SE
- 1953: Béla Goldoványi (3), Budapest
- 1954: Béla Goldoványi (4), Dózsa SE
- 1955: Béla Goldoványi (5), Bp. Építők
- 1956: Béla Goldoványi (6), Bp. Építők
- 1957: Béla Goldoványi (7), Bp. Építők
- 1958: Béla Goldoványi (8), Bp. Építők
- 1959: Csaba Csutorás, Bp. Honvéd
- 1960: Csaba Csutorás (2), Bp. Honvéd
- 1961: László Mihályfi, TFSE
- 1962: Csaba Csutorás (3), Bp. Honvéd
- 1963: László Mihályfi (2), TFSE
- 1964: Csaba Csutorás (4), Bp. Honvéd
- 1965: László Mihályfi (3), BEAC
- 1966: László Mihályfi (4), BEAC
- 1967: József Istóczky, Ú. Dózsa
- 1968: László Mihályfi (5), BEAC
- 1969: László Mihályfi (6), BEAC
- 1970: Tibor Farkas, Bp. Honvéd
- 1971: József Fügedi, Ú. Dózsa
- 1972: Gyula Magyar, Bp. Honvéd
- 1973: Tibor Farkas (2), Bp. Honvéd
- 1974: Tibor Farkas (3), Bp. Honvéd
- 1975: László Lukács, PMSC
- 1976: Tibor Petőházi, Ajkai Alumínium
- 1977: István Nagy, Hevesi SE
- 1978: László Babály, Debreceni MVSC
- 1979: István Csatár, Bp. Honvéd
- 1980: István Nagy (2), Hevesi SE
- 1981: Ferenc Kiss, Csepel
- 1982: István Nagy (3), Hevesi SE
- 1983: István Nagy (4), Hevesi SE
- 1984: Attila Kovács, Ú. Dózsa
- 1985: István Nagy, Hevesi SE
- 1986: György Fetter, Bp. Spartacus
- 1987: Attila Kovács (2), Ú. Dózsa
- 1988: Attila Kovács (3), Ú. Dózsa
- 1989: Tamás Molnár, NYVSSC
- 1990: László Karaffa, Bp. Honvéd
- 1991: Attila Kovács (4), Ú. Dózsa
- 1992: László Karaffa, Bp. Honvéd
- 1993: Pál Rezák, UTE
- 1994: Pál Rezák (2), UTE
- 1995: László Karaffa (2), Bp. Honvéd
- 1996: György Dobos, UTE
- 1997: Miklós Gyulai, Bp. Honvéd
- 1998: Miklós Gyulai (2), NYVSC
- 1999: Roland Németh, Soproni SI
- 2000: Gábor Dobos, Bp. Honvéd
- 2001: Zsolt Szeglet, Győri Dózsa
- 2002: Zsolt Szeglet (2), Győri Dózsa
- 2003: Géza Pauer, Bp. Honvéd
- 2004: Géza Pauer (2), Bp. Honvéd
- 2005: Roland Németh (2), Soproni AC
- 2006: Miklós Szebeny, Vasas
- 2007: Péter Miklós, Bp. Honvéd
- 2008: Gábor Pásztor, FTC
- 2009: Balázs Baji, Békéscsabai AC
- 2010: Gábor Pásztor (2), FTC
- 2011: Tibor Kása, Haladás
- 2012: Tibor Kása (2), Haladás
- 2013: Győző Móré, GEAC
- 2014: Bálint Móricz, Haladás
- 2015: Bálint Móricz (2), Haladás
- 2016: János Sipos, Szolnoki MÁV
- 2017: László Szabó, FTC
- 2018: László Szabó (2), FTC
- 2019: Bence Boros, Szolnoki MÁV

=== 400 metres ===
440 yards

- 1896: Alajos Szokolyi, MAC
- 1897: Pál Koppán, MUE
- 1898: István Záborszky, MAC
- 1899: Ernő Schubert, MUE
- 1900: Ernő Schubert (2), MUE
- 1901: [[]], OTE
- 1902: [[]], [[]]
- 1903: [[]], [[]]
- 1904: [[]], [[]]
- 1905: [[]], [[]]
- 1906: [[]], [[]]
- 1907: [[]], [[]]
- 1908: [[]], [[]]
- 1909: [[]], [[]]
- 1910: [[]], [[]]
- 1911: [[]], [[]]
- 1912: [[]], [[]]
- 1913: [[]], [[]]
- 1914: [[]], [[]]

400 metres

- 1915: [[]], [[]]
- 1916: [[]], [[]]
- 1917: [[]], [[]]
- 1918: [[]], [[]]
- 1919: [[]], [[]]
- 1920: [[]], [[]]
- 1921: [[]], [[]]
- 1922: [[]], [[]]
- 1923: [[]], [[]]
- 1924: [[]], [[]]
- 1925: [[]], [[]]
- 1926: [[]], [[]]
- 1927: [[]], [[]]
- 1928: [[]], [[]]
- 1929: [[]], [[]]
- 1930: [[]], [[]]
- 1931: [[]], [[]]
- 1932: [[]], [[]]
- 1933: [[]], [[]]
- 1934: [[]], [[]]
- 1935: [[]], [[]]
- 1936: [[]], [[]]
- 1937: [[]], [[]]
- 1938: [[]], [[]]
- 1939: [[]], [[]]
- 1940: [[]], [[]]
- 1941: [[]], [[]]
- 1942: [[]], [[]]
- 1943: [[]], [[]]
- 1944: [[]], [[]]
- 1945: [[]], [[]]
- 1946: [[]], [[]]
- 1947: [[]], [[]]
- 1948: [[]], [[]]
- 1949: [[]], [[]]
- 1950: [[]], [[]]
- 1951: [[]], [[]]
- 1952: [[]], [[]]
- 1953: [[]], [[]]
- 1954: [[]], [[]]
- 1955: [[]], [[]]
- 1956: [[]], [[]]
- 1957: [[]], [[]]
- 1958: [[]], [[]]
- 1959: [[]], [[]]
- 1960: István Korda
- 1961: István Korda
- 1962: Csaba Csutorás
- 1963: István Gyulai
- 1964: István Gyulai
- 1965: László Mihályfi
- 1966: István Gyulai
- 1967: László Mihályfi
- 1968: László Mihályfi
- 1969: István Rózsa
- 1970: István Rózsa
- 1971: József Fügedi
- 1972: István Rózsa
- 1973: István Rózsa
- 1974: István Rózsa
- 1975: István Rózsa
- 1976: Nándor Hornyacsek
- 1977: Nándor Hornyacsek
- 1978: Nándor Hornyacsek
- 1979: András Paróczai
- 1980: András Paróczai
- 1981: Sándor Újhelyi
- 1982: Sándor Újhelyi
- 1983: Sándor Újhelyi
- 1984: Gusztáv Menczer
- 1985: Gusztáv Menczer
- 1986: Gusztáv Menczer
- 1987: Tamás Molnár
- 1988: Tamás Molnár
- 1989: Tamás Molnár
- 1990: Ervin Katona
- 1991: Tamás Molnár
- 1992: Tamás Molnár
- 1993: Gusztáv Menczer
- 1994: Gábor Kiss
- 1995: Dusán Kovács
- 1996: Tibor Szél
- 1997: Péter Nyilasi
- 1998: Péter Nyilasi
- 1999: Zsolt Szeglet
- 2000: Attila Kilvinger
- 2001: Zsolt Szeglet
- 2002: Zsolt Szeglet
- 2003: Zsolt Szeglet
- 2004: Zsolt Szeglet
- 2005: Zoltán Borsányi
- 2006: Balázs Molnár
- 2007: [[]], [[]]
- 2008: [[]], [[]]
- 2009: [[]], [[]]
- 2010: [[]], [[]]
- 2011: [[]], [[]]
- 2012: [[]], [[]]
- 2013: [[]], [[]]
- 2014: [[]], [[]]
- 2015: [[]], [[]]
- 2016: [[]], [[]]
- 2017: [[]], [[]]
- 2018: [[]], [[]]
- 2019: [[]], [[]]

=== 800 metres ===
880 yard

- 1904: József Nagy, BAK
- 1905: József Nagy (2), BAK
- 1906: Ödön Bodor, BPTTSE
- 1907: Rezső Holics, BEAC
- 1908: József Nagy (3), BBTE
- 1909: Ödön Bodor (2), BPTTSE
- 1910: Ödön Bodor (3), BPTTSE
- 1911: Ödön Bodor (4), BPTTSE
- 1912: Ödön Bodor (5), BPTTSE
- 1913: Ferenc Rajz, MTK
- 1914: György Mickler, MTK

800 metres

- 1915: István Déván, MAC
- 1916: József Bognár, MTE
- 1917: Jenő Németh, FTC
- 1918: István Grósz, MTK
- 1919: János Benedek, BEAC
- 1920: János Benedek (2), BEAC
- ...
- 1960: Péter Parsch
- 1961: Lajos Szentgáli
- 1962: Péter Parsch
- 1963: Péter Parsch
- 1964: János Aradi
- 1965: János Aradi
- 1966: Lóránd Stoll
- 1967: Imre Nagy
- 1968: Róbert Honti
- 1969: György Molnár
- 1970: András Zsinka
- 1971: György Molnár
- 1972: Sándor Fekete
- 1973: Sándor Fekete
- 1974: András Zsinka
- 1975: András Paróczai
- 1976: András Zsinka
- 1977: János Zemen
- 1978: András Paróczai
- 1979: András Paróczai
- 1980: András Paróczai
- 1981: József Bereczki
- 1982: Sándor Paróczai
- 1983: Imre Ötvös
- 1984: Zsolt Szabó
- 1985: Zsolt Szabó
- 1986: Sándor Paróczai
- 1987: József Bereczki
- 1988: István Szalai
- 1989: Róbert Banai
- 1990: Róbert Banai
- 1991: Tibor Martina
- 1992: Róbert Banai
- 1993: Miklós Répási
- 1994: Miklós Répási
- 1995: Balázs Tölgyesi
- 1996: Balázs Tölgyesi
- 1997: Balázs Tölgyesi
- 1998: Balázs Korányi
- 1999: Balázs Korányi
- 2000: Balázs Korányi
- 2001: István Kerékjártó
- 2002: Balázs Tölgyesi
- 2003: István Kerékjártó
- 2004: István Kerékjártó
- 2005: Dávid Takács
- 2006: Dávid Takács

=== 1500 metres ===
1 mile

- 1896: František Horn, Bohemia
- 1897: Bohumil Rudl, Bohemia
- 1898: Felix Graf, Austria
- 1899: Hermann Wraschtil, Austria
- 1900: Hermann Wraschtil (2), Austria
- 1901: Ferenc Gillemot, MFC
- 1902: Pál Bredl, MAC
- 1903: József Nagy, MUE
- 1904: József Nagy (2), BAK
- 1905: Ödön Bodor, BPTTSE
- 1906: Ödön Bodor (2), BPTTSE
- 1907: Imre Veres, MAC
- 1908: Ödön Bodor (3), BPTTSE
- 1909: József Nagy (3), BBTE
- 1910: Ödön Bodor (4), BPTTSE
- 1911: János Antal, MAC
- 1912: Ferenc Forgács, BEAC
- 1913: Ferenc Forgács (2), BEAC
- 1914: Teofil Savniky, MTK

1500 metres

- 1915: [[]], MTE
- 1916: [[]], MTE
- 1917: [[]], FTC
- 1918: [[]], MTK
- 1919: [[]], MTE
- 1920: [[]], MTK
- ...
- 1960: István Rózsavölgyi
- 1961: Lajos Szentgáli
- 1962: Péter Parsch
- 1963: Péter Parsch
- 1964: György Kiss
- 1965: György Kiss
- 1966: István Jóny
- 1967: György Kiss
- 1968: Róbert Honti
- 1969: János Török
- 1970: Péter Mohácsi
- 1971: György Molnár
- 1972: György Molnár
- 1973: János Török
- 1974: János Zemen
- 1975: János Zemen
- 1976: János Zemen
- 1977: János Zemen
- 1978: László Kispál
- 1979: János Hrenek
- 1980: István Lajkó
- 1981: Imre Deák-Nagy
- 1982: Attila Syulok
- 1983: László Tóth
- 1984: József Búcsúházi
- 1985: Gábor Szabó
- 1986: Gábor Szabó
- 1987: István Knipl
- 1988: Róbert Banai
- 1989: Róbert Banai
- 1990: Róbert Banai
- 1991: Róbert Banai
- 1992: Róbert Banai
- 1993: Róbert Banai
- 1994: Róbert Banai
- 1995: Balázs Tölgyesi
- 1996: Balázs Tölgyesi
- 1997: Balázs Tölgyesi
- 1998: Balázs Tölgyesi
- 1999: Balázs Tölgyesi
- 2000: Balázs Tölgyesi
- 2001: Balázs Csillag
- 2002: Béla Horváth II
- 2003: Olivér Bodor
- 2004: Balázs Csillag
- 2005: Gábor Csaja
- 2006: Barnabás Bene

=== 5000 metres ===
3 miles

- 1906: Gyula Gál, BAK
- 1907: Arnošt Nejedlý, Bohemia
- 1908: Antal Lovas, MTK
- 1909: Antonín Dvořák (2), Bohemia
- 1910: Mihály Váradi, BEAC
- 1911: Felix Kwieton, Austria
- 1912: Mihály Váradi (2), BEAC
- 1913: Ferenc Forgács, BEAC
- 1914: Mihály Váradi (3), BEAC

5000 metres

- 1915: Vince Vörös, MTE
- 1916: János Kaiser, MTE
- 1917: Miklós Körmendi, MTK
- 1918: József Bese, MTE
- 1919: Vince Vörös (2), MTE
- 1920: Mihály Váradi (4), BEAC
- ...
- 1960: Sándor Iharos
- 1961: Sándor Iharos
- 1962: György Kiss
- 1963: János Pintér
- 1964: Lajos Mecser
- 1965: Dénes Simon
- 1966: Lajos Mecser
- 1967: György Kiss
- 1968: Lajos Mecser
- 1969: János Török
- 1970: Lajos Mecser
- 1971: János Török
- 1972: Péter Mohácsi
- 1973: Gábor Báthori
- 1974: János Török
- 1975: Dániel Sietõ
- 1976: László Kispál
- 1977: László Kispál
- 1978: László Kispál
- 1979: László Tóth
- 1980: László Kispál
- 1981: József Májer
- 1982: László Szász
- 1983: Gábor Szabó
- 1984: Gábor Markó
- 1985: Tamás Szabó
- 1986: Gábor Szabó
- 1987: Zoltán Kadlóth
- 1988: Tibor Velczenbach
- 1989: Zoltán Káldy
- 1990: Ivan Konovalov (URS)
- 1991: Gábor Markó
- 1992: Zoltán Káldy
- 1993: Zoltán Káldy
- 1994: Imre Berkovics
- 1995: Zoltán Káldy
- 1996: Zoltán Káldy
- 1997: Tamás Kliszek
- 1998: Tamás Kliszek
- 1999: János Szemán
- 2000: Imre Berkovics
- 2001: Balázs Csillag
- 2002: Olivér Bodor
- 2003: Olivér Bodor
- 2004: Balázs Csillag
- 2005: Barnabás Bene
- 2006: Barnabás Bene

=== 10,000 metres ===
- 1930: [[]], Soroksári AC
- 1931: [[]], Soroksári AC
- 1932: [[]], MTK
- 1933: [[]], Vasas
- 1934: [[]], MTK
- 1935: [[]], BBTE
- ...
- 1960: Sándor Iharos
- 1961: Miklós Szabó
- 1962: József Sütõ
- 1963: József Sütõ
- 1964: Lajos Mecser
- 1965: Lajos Mecser
- 1966: Lajos Mecser
- 1967: György Kiss
- 1968: János Szerényi
- 1969: Dénes Simon
- 1970: Lajos Mecser
- 1971: Lajos Mecser
- 1972: Béla Tóth
- 1973: Béla Tóth
- 1974: András Fancsali
- 1975: Péter Mohácsi
- 1976: András Fancsali
- 1977: István Kerékjártó
- 1978: István Kerékjártó
- 1979: Miklós Golács
- 1980: József Májer
- 1981: István Kerékjártó
- 1982: Béla Horváth
- 1983: József Májer
- 1984: József Májer
- 1985: Gábor Markó
- 1986: Gábor Szabó
- 1987: Zoltán Káldy
- 1988: Zoltán Kadlóth
- 1989: Zoltán Káldy
- 1990: Zoltán Káldy
- 1991: Zoltán Káldy
- 1992: Zoltán Káldy
- 1993: Zoltán Káldy
- 1994: Tamás Kliszek
- 1995: Zoltán Káldy
- 1996: Zoltán Káldy
- 1997: Zoltán Káldy
- 1998: Tamás Kliszek
- 1999: Imre Berkovics
- 2000: Ferenc Sági
- 2001: Miklós Zatykó
- 2002: Máté Németh
- 2003: Olivér Bodor
- 2004: Barnabás Bene
- 2005: Barnabás Bene
- 2006: Barnabás Bene

=== 10K run ===
- 2014: [[]], Békéscsabai AC
- 2015: [[]], Békéscsabai AC
- 2016: [[]], BEAC
- 2017: [[]], Debreceni SC
- 2018: [[]], Psn Zrt.
- 2019: [[]], KARC

=== Half marathon ===
- 1992: János Szemán
- 1993: Péter Jáger
- 1994: Péter Jáger
- 1995: Zoltán Káldy
- 1996: Zoltán Káldy
- 1997: Tamás Kliszek
- 1998: Zsolt Bácskai
- 1999: Zsolt Bácskai
- 2000: Imre Berkovics
- 2001: Zsolt Benedek
- 2002: Zsolt Benedek
- 2003: Miklós Zatykó
- 2004: Tamás Tóth
- 2005: András Juhász

=== Marathon ===
- 1925: Pál Király, ESC
- 1926: Pál Király (2), ESC
- 1927: Pál Király (3), ESC
- 1928: József Galambos, KiSE
- 1929: István Zelenka, SBTC
- 1930: József Galambos (2), ESC
- 1931: József Galambos (3), ESC
- 1932: József Galambos (4), ESC
- 1933: József Galambos (5), ESC
- 1934: József Gyetvay, SzVSE
- ...
- 1960: József Dobronyi
- 1961: Zoltán Kovács
- 1962: Béla Szalay
- 1963: József Sütõ
- 1964: József Sütõ
- 1965: József Sütõ
- 1966: Gyula Tóth
- 1967: Gyula Tóth
- 1968: Gyula Tóth
- 1969: Gyula Tóth
- 1970: Gyula Tóth
- 1971: Imre Berkovics
- 1972: Gyula Tóth
- 1973: Ferenc Szekeres
- 1974: Ferenc Szekeres
- 1975: Ferenc Szekeres
- 1976: György Sinkó
- 1977: György Sinkó
- 1978: Ferenc Szekeres
- 1979: Ferenc Szekeres
- 1980: János Szekeres
- 1981: Ferenc Szekeres
- 1982: Ferenc Szekeres
- 1983: Zoltán Kiss
- 1984: Zoltán Kiss
- 1985: Attila Bauer
- 1986: István Kerékjártó
- 1987: János Papp
- 1988: Gábor Szabó
- 1989: Csaba Szûcs
- 1990: Csaba Szûcs
- 1991: János Papp
- 1992: Zoltán Holba
- 1993: Zoltán Holba
- 1994: Zoltán Holba
- 1995: Zoltán Holba
- 1996: Endre Laczfi
- 1997: Márton Lajtos
- 1998: Gergely Rezessy
- 1999: Gergely Rezessy
- 2000: János Szemán
- 2001: Antal Szûcs
- 2002: Gergely Rezessy
- 2003: László Nagy
- 2004: Roland Ádók
- 2005: Miklós Zatykó
- 2006: Gergely Rezessy

=== 110 metres hurdles ===
120 yards hurdles

- 1901: [[]], BEAC
- 1902: [[]], BBTE
- 1903: [[]], BBTE
- 1904: [[]], BEAC
- 1905: [[]], BBTE
- 1906: [[]], UTE
- 1907: [[]], UTE
- 1908: [[]], BBTE
- 1909: [[]], BBTE
- 1910: [[]], BBTE
- 1911: [[]], BBTE
- 1912: [[]], FTC
- 1913: [[]], BEAC
- 1914: [[]], FTC

110 metres hurdles

- 1915: [[]], FTC
- 1916: [[]], FTC
- 1917: [[]], MAC
- 1918: [[]], MAC
- 1919: [[]], MAC
- 1920: [[]], MAC
- ...
- 1960: Imre Retezár
- 1961: Imre Retezár
- 1962: Imre Retezár
- 1963: Zoltán Csányi
- 1964: Miklós Fluck
- 1965: Béla Mélykuti
- 1966: Béla Mélykuti
- 1967: Béla Mélykuti
- 1968: Béla Mélykuti
- 1969: Béla Mélykuti
- 1970: Béla Mélykuti
- 1971: Lóránd Milassin
- 1972: Lóránd Milassin
- 1973: Lóránd Milassin
- 1974: László Bognár
- 1975: Lóránd Milassin
- 1976: Lóránd Milassin
- 1977: Lóránd Milassin
- 1978: Lóránd Milassin
- 1979: Attila Bartha
- 1980: György Bakos
- 1981: György Bakos
- 1982: György Bakos
- 1983: György Bakos
- 1984: György Bakos
- 1985: György Bakos
- 1986: György Bakos
- 1987: György Bakos
- 1988: György Bakos
- 1989: György Bakos
- 1990: György Bakos
- 1991: György Bakos
- 1992: Lajos Sárközi
- 1993: Levente Csillag
- 1994: Levente Csillag
- 1995: Levente Csillag
- 1996: Levente Csillag
- 1997: Levente Csillag
- 1998: Gergely Palágyi
- 1999: Levente Csillag
- 2000: Levente Csillag
- 2001: Levente Csillag
- 2002: Levente Csillag
- 2003: Balázs Kovács
- 2004: Levente Csillag
- 2005: Dániel Kiss
- 2006: Dániel Kiss

=== 200 metres hurdles ===
- 1960: István Munkácsi
- 1961: István Munkácsi
- 1962: Imre Retezár
- 1963: Zoltán Csányi

=== 400 metres hurdles ===
- 1920: [[]], MTK
- 1921: [[]], BEAC
- 1922: [[]], MAC
- 1923: [[]], MAC
- 1924: [[]], MAC
- 1925: [[]], MAC
- ...
- 1960: István Munkácsi
- 1961: István Munkácsi
- 1962: László Török
- 1963: Miklós Vértesy
- 1964: János Benkõ
- 1965: Miklós Vértesy
- 1966: Ferenc Oros
- 1967: Zsolt Ringhofer
- 1968: Zsolt Ringhofer
- 1969: Zsolt Ringhofer
- 1970: István Kövesdi
- 1971: István Árva
- 1972: István Árva
- 1973: István Árva
- 1974: István Árva
- 1975: István Árva
- 1976: János Aradi
- 1977: István Árva
- 1978: István Kövesdi
- 1979: József Szalai
- 1980: József Szalai
- 1981: István Simon-Balla
- 1982: István Simon-Balla
- 1983: István Takács
- 1984: József Szalai
- 1985: István Takács
- 1986: István Simon-Balla
- 1987: Róbert Bágyi
- 1988: István Simon-Balla
- 1989: István Simon-Balla
- 1990: Róbert Bágyi
- 1991: Róbert Bágyi
- 1992: Dusán Kovács
- 1993: Dusán Kovács
- 1994: Dusán Kovács
- 1995: Dusán Kovács
- 1996: Dusán Kovács
- 1997: Dusán Kovács
- 1998: Tibor Bédi
- 1999: Tibor Bédi
- 2000: Tibor Bédi
- 2001: Dusán Kovács
- 2002: Dusán Kovács
- 2003: Ákos Dezsõ
- 2004: Ákos Dezsõ
- 2005: Ákos Dezsõ
- 2006: Balázs Molnár

=== 3000 metres steeplechase ===
- 1938: [[]], UTE
- 1939: [[]], UTE
- 1940: [[]], BBTE
- 1941: [[]], BBTE
- 1942: [[]], Testvériség
- 1943: [[]], V.MOVE
- ...
- 1960: Gerhart Hecker
- 1961: Attila Simon
- 1962: Miklós Fazekas
- 1963: József Mácsár
- 1964: Attila Simon
- 1965: Miklós Fazekas
- 1966: István Jóny
- 1967: István Jóny
- 1968: József Pamuki
- 1969: István Jóny
- 1970: Sándor Máthé
- 1971: István Jóny
- 1972: Balázs Hazai
- 1973: Sándor Máthé
- 1974: Gyula Németh
- 1975: János Mester
- 1976: László Kocsis
- 1977: László Kocsis
- 1978: László Kocsis
- 1979: Gábor Markó
- 1980: Gyula Balogh
- 1981: István Szénégetõ
- 1982: Gábor Markó
- 1983: Gábor Markó
- 1984: Gábor Markó
- 1985: Béla Vágó
- 1986: Gábor Markó
- 1987: Béla Vágó
- 1988: Béla Vágó
- 1989: Béla Vágó
- 1990: Gábor Markó
- 1991: Gábor Markó
- 1992: Béla Vágó
- 1993: Gábor Markó
- 1994: Béla Vágó
- 1995: Béla Vágó
- 1996: Róbert Banai
- 1997: Róbert Banai
- 1998: Sándor Serfõzõ
- 1999: Levente Tímár
- 2000: Levente Tímár
- 2001: Máté Németh
- 2002: Máté Németh
- 2003: Máté Németh
- 2004: Levente Tímár
- 2005: Albert Minczér
- 2006: Balázs Ott

=== High jump ===
- 1960: Sándor Noszály
- 1961: Sándor Noszály
- 1962: János Medovarszki
- 1963: János Medovarszki
- 1964: János Medovarszki
- 1965: János Medovarszki
- 1966: János Medovarszki
- 1967: Sándor Noszály
- 1968: Sándor Noszály
- 1969: József Tihányi
- 1970: Endre Kelemen
- 1971: Endre Kelemen
- 1972: Ádám Szepesi
- 1973: István Major
- 1974: Endre Kelemen
- 1975: Endre Kelemen
- 1976: István Major
- 1977: István Major
- 1978: István Major
- 1979: István Széles
- 1980: Zoltán Társi
- 1981: István Széles
- 1982: Tibor Gerstenbrein
- 1983: István Gibicsár
- 1984: István Gibicsár
- 1985: István Gibicsár
- 1986: Gyula Németh
- 1987: Ferenc Pál
- 1988: Benõ Bese
- 1989: Gyula Németh
- 1990: Benõ Bese
- 1991: András Tresch
- 1992: Péter Deutsch
- 1993: Péter Deutsch
- 1994: Zoltán Bakler
- 1995: Péter Deutsch
- 1996: István Kovács
- 1997: István Kovács
- 1998: Attila Zsivoczky
- 1999: Gergely Bata
- 2000: Román Fehér
- 2001: Román Fehér
- 2002: Román Fehér
- 2003: László Boros
- 2004: László Boros
- 2005: László Boros
- 2006: László Boros

=== Pole vault ===
- 1960: János Miskei
- 1961: János Miskei
- 1962: János Horváth
- 1963: István Tamás
- 1964: Endre Gagyi
- 1965: János Miskei
- 1966: János Miskei
- 1967: Ágoston Schulek
- 1968: Ágoston Schulek
- 1969: Ágoston Schulek
- 1970: Mihály Kalmár
- 1971: Róbert Steinhacker
- 1972: Róbert Steinhacker
- 1973: Károly Viskovics
- 1974: Mihály Kalmár
- 1975: Róbert Steinhacker
- 1976: János Veisz
- 1977: Ernõ Makó
- 1978: János Veisz
- 1979: László Franke
- 1980: József Novobáczky
- 1981: László Fülöp
- 1982: Ferenc Salbert
- 1983: Ferenc Salbert
- 1984: Ferenc Salbert
- 1985: Ernõ Makó
- 1986: Gábor Molnár
- 1987: Dezsõ Szabó
- 1988: István Bagyula
- 1989: István Bagyula
- 1990: Dezsõ Szabó
- 1991: Zoltán Farkas
- 1992: Dezsõ Szabó
- 1993: Pál Rohánszky
- 1994: István Bagyula
- 1995: István Bagyula
- 1996: Dezsõ Szabó
- 1997: Ferenc László
- 1998: István Bagyula
- 1999: Ferenc László
- 2000: Dezsõ Szabó
- 2001: Dezsõ Szabó
- 2002: Péter Kovács
- 2003: János Váczi
- 2004: János Váczi
- 2005: Péter Skoumal
- 2006: Zoltán Szörényi

=== Long jump ===
- 1960: Henrik Kalocsai
- 1961: Henrik Kalocsai
- 1962: Henrik Kalocsai
- 1963: Henrik Kalocsai
- 1964: Béla Margitics
- 1965: Henrik Kalocsai
- 1966: Henrik Kalocsai
- 1967: Henrik Kalocsai
- 1968: Béla Margitics
- 1969: Henrik Kalocsai
- 1970: Henrik Kalocsai
- 1971: Henrik Kalocsai
- 1972: Gábor Katona
- 1973: Henrik Kalocsai
- 1974: Gyula Németh
- 1975: Gyula Németh
- 1976: Tibor Kövesi
- 1977: Tibor Parti
- 1978: László Szalma
- 1979: Béla Bakosi
- 1980: László Szalma
- 1981: László Szalma
- 1982: László Szalma
- 1983: László Szalma
- 1984: Gyula Pálóczi
- 1985: László Szalma
- 1986: Gyula Pálóczi
- 1987: Zsolt Szabó
- 1988: László Szalma
- 1989: Csaba Almási
- 1990: Gyula Pálóczi
- 1991: Csaba Almási
- 1992: Csaba Almási
- 1993: Tibor Ordina
- 1994: János Uzsoki
- 1995: Tibor Ordina
- 1996: Tibor Ordina
- 1997: János Uzsoki
- 1998: Tibor Ordina
- 1999: János Uzsoki
- 2000: Balázs Dömötör
- 2001: Tamás Margl
- 2002: Imre Lõrincz
- 2003: Imre Lõrincz
- 2004: Tamás Margl
- 2005: Pál Babicz
- 2006: Imre Lõrincz

=== Triple jump ===
- 1960: Róbert Németh
- 1961: Gyula Czapulai
- 1962: Henrik Kalocsai
- 1963: Henrik Kalocsai
- 1964: Drágán Ivanov
- 1965: Henrik Kalocsai
- 1966: Drágán Ivanov
- 1967: Henrik Kalocsai
- 1968: Henrik Kalocsai
- 1969: Zoltán Cziffra
- 1970: Henrik Kalocsai
- 1971: Henrik Kalocsai
- 1972: Gábor Katona
- 1973: Henrik Kalocsai
- 1974: Zoltán Cziffra
- 1975: Zoltán Cziffra
- 1976: Gábor Katona
- 1977: Gábor Katona
- 1978: Gábor Katona
- 1979: Béla Bakosi
- 1980: Béla Bakosi
- 1981: Béla Bakosi
- 1982: Béla Bakosi
- 1983: Gábor Katona
- 1984: Béla Bakosi
- 1985: Béla Bakosi
- 1986: Béla Bakosi
- 1987: Béla Bakosi
- 1988: Gyula Pálóczi
- 1989: Gyula Pálóczi
- 1990: Gyula Pálóczi
- 1991: Tamás Olasz
- 1992: Zsolt Czingler
- 1993: Gyula Pálóczi
- 1994: Gyula Pálóczi
- 1995: Zsolt Czingler
- 1996: Zsolt Czingler
- 1997: Zsolt Czingler
- 1998: Zsolt Czingler
- 1999: Zsolt Czingler
- 2000: Zsolt Czingler
- 2001: Péter Tölgyesi
- 2002: Péter Tölgyesi
- 2003: Péter Tölgyesi
- 2004: Péter Tölgyesi
- 2005: János Farkas
- 2006: Péter Tölgyesi

=== Shot put ===
- 1960: Vilmos Varjú
- 1961: Zsigmond Nagy
- 1962: Zsigmond Nagy
- 1963: Vilmos Varjú
- 1964: Vilmos Varjú
- 1965: Vilmos Varjú
- 1966: Vilmos Varjú
- 1967: Vilmos Varjú
- 1968: Vilmos Varjú
- 1969: Vilmos Varjú
- 1970: Vilmos Varjú
- 1971: Vilmos Varjú
- 1972: Vilmos Varjú
- 1973: János Faragó
- 1974: György Nagy
- 1975: János Faragó
- 1976: János Faragó
- 1977: János Faragó
- 1978: László Szabó
- 1979: László Szabó
- 1980: István Kácsor
- 1981: István Kácsor
- 1982: István Kácsor
- 1983: László Szabó
- 1984: László Szabó
- 1985: Zsigmond Ladányi
- 1986: László Szabó
- 1987: Zsigmond Ladányi
- 1988: László Szabó
- 1989: Jenõ Kóczián
- 1990: Jenõ Kóczián
- 1991: József Ficsor
- 1992: Jenõ Kóczián
- 1993: Jenõ Kóczián
- 1994: Jenõ Kóczián
- 1995: Jenõ Kóczián
- 1996: Jenõ Kóczián
- 1997: Jenõ Kóczián
- 1998: Attila Pintér
- 1999: Szilárd Kiss
- 2000: Zsolt Bíber
- 2001: Szilárd Kiss
- 2002: Szilárd Kiss
- 2003: Zsolt Bíber
- 2004: Zsolt Bíber
- 2005: Zsolt Bíber
- 2006: Lajos Kürthy

=== Discus throw ===
- 1960: József Szécsényi
- 1961: József Szécsényi
- 1962: József Szécsényi
- 1963: József Szécsényi
- 1964: Géza Fejér
- 1965: József Szécsényi
- 1966: Géza Fejér
- 1967: Géza Fejér
- 1968: Ferenc Tégla
- 1969: Ferenc Tégla
- 1970: Ferenc Tégla
- 1971: Géza Fejér
- 1972: Géza Fejér
- 1973: Géza Fejér
- 1974: János Murányi
- 1975: Géza Fejér
- 1976: Ferenc Tégla
- 1977: Ferenc Tégla
- 1978: János Faragó
- 1979: Géza Fejér
- 1980: Ferenc Szegletes
- 1981: Ferenc Szegletes
- 1982: Ferenc Csiszár
- 1983: Ferenc Csiszár
- 1984: Ferenc Tégla
- 1985: Csaba Holló
- 1986: Csaba Holló
- 1987: Attila Horváth
- 1988: József Ficsor
- 1989: József Ficsor
- 1990: Attila Horváth
- 1991: Attila Horváth
- 1992: Attila Horváth
- 1993: Attila Horváth
- 1994: Attila Horváth
- 1995: Attila Horváth
- 1996: Attila Horváth
- 1997: Attila Horváth
- 1998: Róbert Fazekas
- 1999: Roland Varga
- 2000: Róbert Fazekas
- 2001: Zoltán Kővágó
- 2002: Róbert Fazekas
- 2003: Róbert Fazekas
- 2004: Zoltán Kővágó
- 2005: Zoltán Kővágó
- 2006: Roland Varga

=== Hammer throw ===
- 1960: Gyula Zsivótzky
- 1961: Gyula Zsivótzky
- 1962: Gyula Zsivótzky
- 1963: Gyula Zsivótzky
- 1964: Gyula Zsivótzky
- 1965: Gyula Zsivótzky
- 1966: Gyula Zsivótzky
- 1967: Gyula Zsivótzky
- 1968: Gyula Zsivótzky
- 1969: Gyula Zsivótzky
- 1970: Gyula Zsivótzky
- 1971: István Encsi
- 1972: Sándor Eckschmiedt
- 1973: István Encsi
- 1974: István Encsi
- 1975: István Encsi
- 1976: Gábor Tamás
- 1977: Gábor Tamás
- 1978: Gábor Tamás
- 1979: Gábor Tamás
- 1980: Gábor Tamás
- 1981: Gábor Tamás
- 1982: Tibor Tánczi
- 1983: Tibor Tánczi
- 1984: Imre Szitás
- 1985: Imre Szitás
- 1986: Tibor Gécsek
- 1987: Tibor Gécsek
- 1988: Tibor Gécsek
- 1989: Tibor Gécsek
- 1990: Tibor Gécsek
- 1991: Tibor Gécsek
- 1992: Tibor Gécsek
- 1993: Tibor Gécsek
- 1994: Tibor Gécsek
- 1995: Balázs Kiss
- 1996: Adrián Annus
- 1997: Zsolt Németh
- 1998: Balázs Kiss
- 1999: Tibor Gécsek
- 2000: Balázs Kiss
- 2001: Tibor Gécsek
- 2002: Adrián Annus
- 2003: Adrián Annus
- 2004: Adrián Annus
- 2005: Krisztián Pars
- 2006: Krisztián Pars

=== Javelin throw ===
- 1960: Gergely Kulcsár
- 1961: Sándor Krasznai
- 1962: Gergely Kulcsár
- 1963: Gergely Kulcsár
- 1964: Gergely Kulcsár
- 1965: Gergely Kulcsár
- 1966: Gergely Kulcsár
- 1967: Gergely Kulcsár
- 1968: Gergely Kulcsár
- 1969: Gergely Kulcsár
- 1970: József Csík
- 1971: Gergely Kulcsár
- 1972: József Csík
- 1973: Miklós Németh
- 1974: György Erdélyi
- 1975: Ferenc Paragi
- 1976: Ferenc Paragi
- 1977: Ferenc Paragi
- 1978: Sándor Boros
- 1979: Ferenc Paragi
- 1980: Miklós Németh
- 1981: Miklós Németh
- 1982: Ferenc Paragi
- 1983: Miklós Németh
- 1984: András Temesi
- 1985: András Temesi
- 1986: Tamás Bolgár
- 1987: László Stefán
- 1988: Attila Bareith
- 1989: László Stefán
- 1990: Ferenc Knausz
- 1991: László Palotai
- 1992: Lajos Varga
- 1993: József Belák
- 1994: József Belák
- 1995: József Belák
- 1996: József Belák
- 1997: József Belák
- 1998: József Belák
- 1999: Gergely Horváth
- 2000: Gergely Horváth
- 2001: Gergely Horváth
- 2002: Gergely Horváth
- 2003: Gergely Horváth
- 2004: Gergely Horváth
- 2005: Gergely Horváth
- 2006: Csongor Olteán

=== Decathlon ===
- 1960: Gyula Hubai
- 1961: Gyula Hubai
- 1962: Gyula Hubai
- 1963: József Bakai
- 1964: Gyula Hubai
- 1965: Gyula Hubai
- 1966: József Bakai
- 1967: József Bakai
- 1968: Tibor Raáb
- 1969: József Bakai
- 1970: József Bakai
- 1971: József Bakai
- 1972: József Bakai
- 1973: Tibor Raáb
- 1974: Tibor Raáb
- 1975: Dániel Czabán
- 1976: Árpád Kiss
- 1977: Árpád Kiss
- 1978: Árpád Kiss
- 1979: Árpád Kiss
- 1980: László Nagy
- 1981: Árpád Kiss
- 1982: József Hoffer
- 1983: József Hoffer
- 1984: József Hoffer
- 1985: Béla Vágó
- 1986: Béla Vágó
- 1987: Dezsõ Szabó
- 1988: Dezsõ Szabó
- 1989: Dezsõ Szabó
- 1990: Dezsõ Szabó
- 1991: Dezsõ Szabó
- 1992: Sándor Munkácsi
- 1993: Sándor Munkácsi
- 1994: Zsolt Kürtösi
- 1995: Sándor Munkácsi
- 1996: Márk Váczi
- 1997: Sándor Munkácsi
- 1998: Zsolt Kürtösi
- 1999: Viktor Kovács
- 2000: Zsolt Kürtösi
- 2001: Tamás Polonyi
- 2002: Zsolt Kürtösi
- 2003: Zsolt Kürtösi
- 2004: Zsolt Kürtösi
- 2005: Péter Skoumal

=== 20 kilometres walk ===
The course of the 1965 20 km championship race was short of the full distance.

- 1960: Tibor Balajcza
- 1961: Tibor Balajcza
- 1962: Antal Kiss
- 1963: István Havasi
- 1964: Antal Kiss
- 1965: János Dalmati
- 1966: István Göri
- 1967: Antal Kiss
- 1968: Andor Antal
- 1969: János Dalmati
- 1970: János Dalmati
- 1971: Andor Antal
- 1972: Andor Antal
- 1973: Sándor Fórián
- 1974: Sándor Fórián
- 1975: Imre Sztankovics
- 1976: Imre Sztankovics
- 1977: László Sátor
- 1978: Imre Sztankovics
- 1979: János Szálas
- 1980: László Sátor
- 1981: János Szálas
- 1982: László Sátor
- 1983: János Szálas
- 1984: János Szálas
- 1985: János Szálas
- 1986: Sándor Urbanik
- 1987: Sándor Urbanik
- 1988: Sándor Urbanik
- 1989: Sándor Urbanik
- 1990: Sándor Urbanik
- 1991: Sándor Urbanik
- 1992: Sándor Urbanik
- 1993: Sándor Urbanik
- 1994: Sándor Urbanik
- 1995: Sándor Urbanik
- 1996: Gyula Dudás
- 1997: Gyula Dudás
- 1998: Gyula Dudás
- 1999: Gyula Dudás
- 2000: Sándor Urbanik
- 2001: Sándor Urbanik
- 2002: Zoltán Czukor
- 2003: Gyula Dudás
- 2004: Gyula Dudás
- 2005: Gyula Dudás
- 2006: Gyula Dudás

=== 50 kilometres walk ===
- 1960: Béla Dinesz
- 1961: István Havasi
- 1962: Béla Dinesz
- 1963: István Havasi
- 1964: István Havasi
- 1965: Antal Kiss
- 1966: István Havasi
- 1967: Antal Kiss
- 1968: István Havasi
- 1969: István Havasi
- 1970: János Dalmati
- 1971: János Dalmati
- 1972: János Dalmati
- 1973: Ferenc Danovszky
- 1974: Csaba Grandpierre
- 1975: Ferenc Danovszky
- 1976: Ferenc Danovszky
- 1977: László Sátor
- 1978: László Sátor
- 1979: László Sátor
- 1980: László Sátor
- 1981: László Sátor
- 1982: Miklós Domján
- 1983: László Sátor
- 1984: László Sátor
- 1985: László Sátor
- 1986: Rudolf Veréb
- 1987: Endre Andrásfai
- 1988: László Sátor
- 1989: László Sátor
- 1990: László Sátor
- 1991: Gyula Dudás
- 1992: Károly Kirszt
- 1993: Gyula Dudás
- 1994: Gyula Dudás
- 1995: Gyula Dudás
- 1996: Sándor Urbanik
- 1997: Gyula Dudás
- 1998: Zoltán Czukor
- 1999: Zoltán Czukor
- 2000: Zoltán Czukor
- 2001: Sándor Urbanik
- 2002: Zoltán Czukor
- 2003: Zoltán Czukor
- 2004: Zoltán Czukor
- 2005: János Tóth
- 2006: Zoltán Czukor

=== Cross country (long course) ===
- 1960: Miklós Szabó
- 1961: Miklós Szabó
- 1962: János Huszár
- 1963: József Sütõ
- 1964: Lajos Mecser
- 1965: Lajos Mecser
- 1966: Lajos Mecser
- 1967: Lajos Mecser
- 1968: Lajos Mecser
- 1969: Lajos Mecser
- 1970: Lajos Mecser
- 1971: Lajos Mecser
- 1972: Béla Tóth
- 1973: Lajos Mecser
- 1974: Lajos Mecser
- 1975: Lajos Mecser
- 1976: János Török
- 1977: István Kerékjártó
- 1978: János Török
- 1979: László Kispál
- 1980: István Kerékjártó
- 1981: István Kerékjártó
- 1982: István Kerékjártó
- 1983: István Kerékjártó
- 1984: József Májer
- 1985: Gábor Szabó
- 1986: Gábor Szabó
- 1987: Zoltán Kiss
- 1988: Zoltán Kadlót
- 1989: Zoltán Káldy
- 1990: György Markó
- 1991: Zoltán Káldy
- 1992: Imre Berkovics
- 1993: Imre Berkovics
- 1994: Imre Berkovics
- 1995: Imre Berkovics
- 1996: Zoltán Káldy
- 1997: Zoltán Káldy
- 1998: Zoltán Káldy
- 1999: András Juhász
- 2000: Zsolt Benedek
- 2001: Miklós Zatykó
- 2002: András Juhász
- 2003: Miklós Zatykó
- 2004: Miklós Zatykó
- 2005: Miklós Zatykó
- 2006: Barnabás Bene

=== Cross country (short course) ===
- 1960: Lajos Kovács
- 1961: Lajos Kovács
- 1962: Attila Simon
- 1963: Béla Szekeres
- 1964: György Kiss
- 1965: Attila Simon
- 1966: István Jóny
- 1967: János Szabó
- 1968: János Török
- 1969: Pál Játékos
- 1970: Nándor Varga
- 1971: János Török
- 1972: Jenõ Ita
- 1973: Péter Mohácsi
- 1974: János Török
- 1975: Not held
- 1976: Not held
- 1977: Not held
- 1978: Not held
- 1979: János Szekeres
- 1980: László Kispál
- 1981: Gábor Szabó
- 1982: Gábor Szabó
- 1983: Gábor Szabó
- 1984: Béla Énekes
- 1985: Attila Kozma
- 1986: József Orosz
- 1987: Gyula Sárközi
- 1988: István Knipl
- 1989: Gábor Szabó
- 1990: Róbert Banai
- 1991: József Bereczki
- 1992: Ivan Konovalov (URS)
- 1993: Ferenc Sági
- 1994: Ferenc Sági
- 1995: Not held
- 1996: Not held
- 1997: Not held
- 1998: Not held
- 1999: Not held
- 2000: Norbert Kõmuves
- 2001: Zsolt Benedek
- 2002: Máté Németh
- 2003: Olivér Bodor
- 2004: Tamás Tóth
- 2005: Balázs Csillag
- 2006: Barnabás Bene

=== 4 × 100 metres relay ===
- 1920: BEAC
- 1921: KAOE
- 1922: KAOE
- 1923: KAOE
- 1924: KAOE
- 1925: KAOE
- 1926: KAOE
- 1927: KAOE
- 1928: KAOE
- 1929: BBTE
- 1930: BBTE
- 1931: BBTE
- 1932: BBTE
- 1933: BBTE
- 1934: BBTE
- 1935: BBTE
- 1936: BBTE
- 1937: BBTE
- 1938: BBTE
- 1939: BBTE
- 1940: BBTE
- 1941: BBTE
- 1942: BBTE
- 1943: BBTE

== Multiple champions ==
=== 100 metres ===
Name	Clubs	Titles
Attila Kovács	UTE	10
Gábor Dobos	Bp. Honvéd	6
Béla Goldoványi	UTE, Budapest, Bp. Építők	5

=== 200 metres ===
Name	Clubs	Titles
Béla Goldoványi	UTE, Budapest, Bp. Építők	8
László Mihályfi	TFSE, BEAC	6
Gyula Gyenes	MAC	5
