= Athletics at the 1999 Summer Universiade – Men's 100 metres =

The men's 100 metres event at the 1999 Summer Universiade was held on 10 and 11 July at the Estadio Son Moix in Palma de Mallorca, Spain.

== Medalists ==
Gold	Silver	Bronze
André da Silva; Brazil	John Capel; United States	Mathew Quinn; South Africa

== Results ==
=== Heats ===
Wind:
Heat 1: +0.6 m/s, Heat 2: -1.9 m/s, Heat 3: -1.9 m/s, Heat 4: +0.2 m/s, Heat 5: -1.4 m/s
Heat 6: -1.3 m/s, Heat 7: -1.9 m/s, Heat 8: -1.0 m/s, Heat 9: -1.4 m/s, Heat 10: -2.0 m/s

Rank	Heat	Athlete	Nationality	Time	Notes
1	4	Sergey Slukin	Russia	10.51	Q
2	8	Kaaron Conwright	United States	10.52	Q
3	6	Mathew Quinn	South Africa	10.53	Q
4	5	Patrick Jarrett	Jamaica	10.54	Q
5	4	Martin Duda	Czech Republic	10.55	Q
6	1	Frédéric Krantz	France	10.58	Q
7	8	Carlos Berlanga	Spain	10.59	Q
7	9	Luca Verdecchia	Italy	10.59	Q
9	2	André da Silva	Brazil	10.60	Q
9	5	Jamie Henthorn	Great Britain	10.60	Q
11	4	Hiroshi Nagashima	Japan	10.61	Q
11	10	Petko Yankov	Bulgaria	10.61	Q
13	3	John Capel	United States	10.63	Q
13	7	Kostas Bogiatsiakis	Greece	10.63	Q
15	4	Édson Ribeiro	Brazil	10.64	q
15	6	Vasilios Seggos	Greece	10.64	Q
17	1	Gary Ryan	Ireland	10.65	Q
17	5	Bradley Agnew	South Africa	10.65	Q
17	5	Urban Acman	Slovenia	10.65	q
17	7	Tommy Kafri	Israel	10.65	Q
17	8	Akihiro Yasui	Japan	10.65	Q
22	9	Gábor Dobos	Hungary	10.66	Q
23	7	Roland Németh	Hungary	10.67	Q
24	6	Sergey Bychkov	Russia	10.71	Q
25	6	Russell Brooks	Canada	10.72	
26	7	Dejan Vojnović	Croatia	10.75	
27	3	Tomáš Dřímal	Czech Republic	10.76	Q
27	9	Mike Nicolini	Canada	10.76	Q
29	2	Daniel Dubois	Switzerland	10.77	Q
29	10	Andrea Rabino	Italy	10.77	Q
31	9	Krzysztof Byzdra	Poland	10.78	
32	4	Juan Pablo Faúndez	Chile	10.80	
32	6	Erol Mutlusoy	Turkey	10.80	
34	1	Joseph Eigriremgmlem	Nigeria	10.82	Q
35	9	Christie van Wyk	Namibia	10.84	
36	3	Nigel Weeks	New Zealand	10.85	Q
37	2	Daniel Money	Great Britain	10.88	Q
37	9	Frutos Feo	Spain	10.88	
39	5	Niclas Sjöstrand	Sweden	10.89	
40	1	Nazmizan Muhammad	Malaysia	10.93	
40	2	Janne Hautaniemi	Finland	10.93	
40	3	Edgardo Serpas	El Salvador	10.93	
43	8	Lim Tan Kok	Malaysia	10.95	
44	5	Ho Kwan Lung	Hong Kong	10.97	
44	8	Zakaria Messayke	Lebanon	10.97	
46	2	Mathew Coad	New Zealand	10.98	
47	10	Boštjan Fridrih	Slovenia	11.02	Q
48	3	Timothy Beck	Netherlands	11.03	
49	7	Félix Omar Fernández	Puerto Rico	11.04	
50	3	Hammed Ajiboye	Nigeria	11.05	
51	1	Aleksandrs Titovs	Latvia	11.06	
52	2	Steven Jones	British Virgin Islands	11.08	
52	8	Thierry Adanabou	Burkina Faso	11.08	
54	5	Khristo Gadzhov	Bulgaria	11.09	
54	10	Hans Vehof	Netherlands	11.09	
56	9	Leung Chun Kit	Hong Kong	11.15	
57	6	Christian Mbarga	Cameroon	11.18	
58	3	Joseph Tomusange	Uganda	11.23	
59	5	Eric Ebang	Gabon	11.28	
60	2	Fabián Aguilera	Chile	11.37	
61	10	Fernando Yem	Peru	11.41	
62	4	Karl Jallad	Lebanon	11.46	
63	10	Chau Way Choi	Macau	11.62	
64	4	Roberto Salvatierra	Peru	11.84	
65	9	Nguyen Thanh De	Vietnam	12.03	
66	8	Ahmad Omar	Iraq	13.85	
	1	Justice Dipeba	Botswana	DNS	
	1	Leong Kin Kuan	Macau	DNS	
	6	Matjar Lazar	Slovenia	DNS	
	7	Ahmed Douhou	Ivory Coast	DNS	
	7	Kenneth Halhjem	Norway	DNS	
	10	Patrick Johnson	Australia	DNS	

=== Quarterfinals ===
Wind:
Heat 1: 0.0 m/s, Heat 2: 0.0 m/s, Heat 3: m/s, Heat 4: +0.1 m/s

Rank	Heat	Athlete	Nationality	Time	Notes
1	4	André da Silva	Brazil	10.28	Q
2	4	John Capel	United States	10.30	Q
3	2	Gábor Dobos	Hungary	10.34	Q
4	3	Mathew Quinn	South Africa	10.35	Q
5	2	Kaaron Conwright	United States	10.36	Q
6	2	Petko Yankov	Bulgaria	10.39	Q
7	4	Roland Németh	Hungary	10.41	Q
8	1	Patrick Jarrett	Jamaica	10.44	Q
9	4	Tommy Kafri	Israel	10.45	Q
10	3	Luca Verdecchia	Italy	10.50	Q
11	2	Édson Ribeiro	Brazil	10.51	Q
12	1	Frédéric Krantz	France	10.52	Q
12	2	Bradley Agnew	South Africa	10.52	
14	3	Martin Duda	Czech Republic	10.53	Q
15	1	Jamie Henthorn	Great Britain	10.56	Q
15	3	Daniel Money	Great Britain	10.56	Q
15	4	Urban Acman	Slovenia	10.56	
18	3	Akihiro Yasui	Japan	10.57	
19	3	Vasilios Seggos	Greece	10.57	
20	1	Carlos Berlanga	Spain	10.58	Q
21	1	Andrea Rabino	Italy	10.59	
21	3	Daniel Dubois	Switzerland	10.59	
21	4	Sergey Slukin	Russia	10.59	
24	2	Gary Ryan	Ireland	10.60	
25	2	Kostas Bogiatsiakis	Greece	10.61	
26	1	Hiroshi Nagashima	Japan	10.64	
27	4	Mike Nicolini	Canada	10.65	
28	4	Tomáš Dřímal	Czech Republic	10.68	
29	2	Sergey Bychkov	Russia	10.72	
30	3	Joseph Eigriremgmlem	Nigeria	10.86	
	1	Nigel Weeks	New Zealand	DNS	
	1	Boštjan Fridrih	Slovenia	DNS	

=== Semifinals ===
Wind:
Heat 1: 0.0 m/s, Heat 2: -1.5 m/s

Rank	Heat	Athlete	Nationality	Time	Notes
1	1	Mathew Quinn	South Africa	10.37	Q
2	2	John Capel	United States	10.39	Q
3	1	Petko Yankov	Bulgaria	10.44	Q
4	1	Kaaron Conwright	United States	10.46	Q
5	1	Gábor Dobos	Hungary	10.49	Q
6	1	Martin Duda	Czech Republic	10.49	
7	2	André da Silva	Brazil	10.50	Q
8	2	Roland Németh	Hungary	10.54	Q
9	1	Édson Ribeiro	Brazil	10.56	
10	2	Patrick Jarrett	Jamaica	10.59	Q
11	1	Luca Verdecchia	Italy	10.61	
12	2	Frédéric Krantz	France	10.66	
13	1	Daniel Money	Great Britain	10.72	
13	2	Carlos Berlanga	Spain	10.72	
15	2	Tommy Kafri	Israel	10.73	
16	2	Jamie Henthorn	Great Britain	10.76	

=== Final ===
Wind: -1.5 m/s

Rank	Athlete	Nationality	Time	Notes
1st place, gold medalist(s)	André da Silva	Brazil	10.34	
2nd place, silver medalist(s)	John Capel	United States	10.35	
3rd place, bronze medalist(s)	Mathew Quinn	South Africa	10.42	
4	Patrick Jarrett	Jamaica	10.44	
5	Petko Yankov	Bulgaria	10.48	
6	Gábor Dobos	Hungary	10.49	
7	Kaaron Conwright	United States	10.55	
8	Roland Németh	Hungary	10.63	
