= Ferenc Forgách =

Ferenc Forgách may refer to:

- Ferenc Forgách (archbishop of Esztergom)
- Ferenc Forgách (bishop of Várad)

Ferenc Forgács may refer to:

- Ferenc Forgács, Hungarian-born Slovak track and field athlete
