= Karl-Heinz Weisenseel =

West German sprinter (born 1954)

Personal information
- Born: 23 January 1954 (age 72)

Sport
- Country: West Germany
- Sport: Athletics
- Event(s): 100 metres 200 metres

Achievements and titles
- Personal best(s): 100 m: 10.36 (1978); 200 m: 21.11 sh WR (1978); 200 m: 20.4 (1976)
Medal record
Men's athletics
Representing the West Germany
European U20 Championships
Bronze medal – third place	1973 Duisburg	4 × 100 m relay

Karl-Heinz Weisenseel (Note: Also spelled Karlheinz Weisenseel) (born 23 January 1954) is a West German former sprinter. He set two indoor 200 metres world records during his career with a best time of 21.11 seconds in 1978. He was a multiple-time national champion individually and won a bronze medal in the 4 × 100 metres relay at the 1973 European Athletics Junior Championships.

== Career ==
Weisenseel entered the 1973 European Athletics Junior Championships in the 200 m and 4 × 100 m relay. He advanced past the 200 m heats but finished 5th in his semi-final. In the relay, Weisenseel led off the West German team to a bronze medal.

In 1974, Weisenseel won the German U20 athletics championships over 100 metres. As a senior, he would go on to win the West German Indoor Athletics Championships 200 metres race four times in a row from 1975 to 1978, including also winning the 60 m in 1976.

At the 1975 West German Indoor Athletics Championships, Weisenseel ran 21.16 seconds over 200 m to set his first world record. It was one of three world records set at the meet. Outdoors, he set season bests of 10.2 and 20.8 over 100 m and 200 m respectively to win competitions in Frankfurt.

Weisenseel entered the 60 metres at the 1976 European Indoor Championships. He placed 4th in his heat, running one hundredth of a second away from qualifying for the semi-finals. Outdoors, he won the 200 m at the West German Athletics Championships and won 200 m races in Köln and Schwetzingen. His Schwetzingen winning time of 20.4 seconds was a West German record.

Weisenseel won the 200 m at the semi-final meet of the 1975 European Cup, but he did not compete in the finals. He won his 200 m semi-final at the outdoor national championships that year but again didn't compete in the finals.

At the 1978 West German Indoor Athletics Championships, Weisenseel improved his world record to 21.11 seconds. He ran 10.36 over 100 m outdoors that year at a competition in Warsaw, Poland.

He finished 3rd in the semi-final meet of the 1979 European Cup over 200 m, and ran a 20.89-second season's best to win a competition in Schriesheim. He was 3rd in the 200 m at the outdoor West German Athletics Championships.

At a meet against the British athletics team in Cosford, Shropshire on 2 February 1980, Weisenseel won the 200 metres ahead of Phil Brown. Outdoors, he ran 20.79 seconds into a headwind to win a 200 m race in Stuttgart. He was named to his country's team at the 1980 Summer Olympics, but they were ultimately boycotted by West Germany.

Weisenseel won the 1981 Weltklasse Zürich meeting over 200 m. He contributed to the West German 4 × 100 m relay team at the 1981 European Cup finals, placing 5th overall with a time of 39.05 seconds.

He competed in his final continental championship at the 1982 European Athletics Indoor Championships, advancing to the semi-finals with the fastest time overall in the 200 m heats but placing last in his semi-final race and not qualifying for the finals. He won a 200 m race in Fürth outdoors in 20.82 seconds.

== Personal life ==
Weisenseel is from Frankfurt, Germany. He represented the PSV Mannheim, LG Kurpfalz, LG Eintracht Frankfurt, MTG Mannheim, and LAC Quelle clubs in competitions.
