= Budapesti Honvéd SE (athletics) =

- Full name: Budapesti Honvéd Sportegyesület
- Founded: 1950
- Ground: Iharos Sándor atlétikapálya
- Location: Budapest, Hungary
- Manager: Györgyi Zsivoczky-Farkas
- Colors: Red and White
- Website: Club home page

The Budapesti Honvéd SE Athletics section was created in 1950 and is one of the most successful athletics teams in Hungary.

== Achievements ==
Competitions	Gold	Silver	Bronze	Total
Summer Olympic Games	0	1	3	4
World Championships	0	0	1	1
European Championships	3	5	8	16

== Notable athletes ==
- (Hungary) Zoltán Adamik
- (Hungary) Tibor Bédi
- (Hungary) Zoltán Cziffra
- (Hungary) Zétény Dombi
- (Hungary) Géza Fejér
- (Hungary) Rita Ináncsi
- (Hungary) Henrik Kalocsai
- (Hungary) Annamária Kovács
- (Hungary) Zoltán Kővágó
- (Hungary) István Major
- (Hungary) Magda Paulányi
- (Hungary) Antal Róka
- (Hungary) István Rózsavölgyi
- (Hungary) Tünde Vaszi
- (Hungary) Györgyi Zsivoczky-Farkas
