= István Gibicsár =

Hungarian high jumper

Personal information
- Born: 13 January 1957 (age 69) Császártöltés, Hungary

Sport
- Sport: Track and field

István Gibicsár (born 13 January 1957) is a retired Hungarian high jumper.

He was born in Császártöltés. He finished ninth at the 1980 European Indoor Championships with a jump of 2.23 metres. He also competed at the 1980 Summer Olympics, but without reaching the final round. He became Hungarian high jump champion in 1983, 1984 and 1985, and also became indoor champion in 1980.

His personal best jump was 2.26 metres, achieved in July 1984 in Debrecen.

== See also ==
- József Jámbor – whose personal best was 2.27 meters in 1982.
