= 1990 World Junior Championships in Athletics – Men's long jump =

The men's long jump event at the 1990 World Junior Championships in Athletics was held in Plovdiv, Bulgaria, at Deveti Septemvri Stadium on 9 and 10 August.

== Medalists ==
| Gold | James Stallworth; United States |
| Silver | Dion Bentley; United States |
| Bronze | Kareem Streete-Thompson; Cayman Islands |

== Results ==
=== Final ===
10 August

| Rank | Name | Nationality | Attempts | | | | | | Result | Notes |
| Rank | Name | Nationality | 1 | 2 | 3 | 4 | 5 | 6 | Result | Notes |
|---|---|---|---|---|---|---|---|---|---|---|
| 1st place, gold medalist(s) | James Stallworth | United States | x | x | 7.81 (w: +0.5 m/s) | x | 8.12 (w: +0.4 m/s) | x | 8.12 (w: +0.4 m/s) | |
| 2nd place, silver medalist(s) | Dion Bentley | United States | 8.05 (w: -0.6 m/s) | x | 7.86 (w: -0.6 m/s) | x | 7.90 (w: +0.4 m/s) | 7.91 (w: +0.9 m/s) | 8.05 (w: -0.6 m/s) | |
| 3rd place, bronze medalist(s) | Kareem Streete-Thompson | Cayman Islands | 7.70 (w: -0.4 m/s) | 7.59 (w: +0.2 m/s) | 7.64 (w: +0.3 m/s) | 7.71 (w: +0.3 m/s) | 7.57 (w: +0.9 m/s) | 7.94 (w: -0.2 m/s) | 7.94 (w: -0.2 m/s) | |
| 4 | Iván Pedroso | Cuba | x | 7.30 (w: +0.3 m/s) | 7.44 (w: -0.3 m/s) | 7.81 (w: -0.2 m/s) | 7.80 (w: +1.1 m/s) | x | 7.81 (w: -0.2 m/s) | |
| 5 | Yasutaka Hattori | Japan | 7.44 (w: -0.1 m/s) | 7.19 (w: NWI) | 7.63 (w: +0.1 m/s) | 7.61 (w: -0.2 m/s) | 7.33 (w: +0.3 m/s) | 7.44 (w: +0.3 m/s) | 7.63 (w: +0.1 m/s) | |
| 6 | Anastasios Georgiou | Greece | 7.35 (w: -0.2 m/s) | x | 7.56 (w: +0.7 m/s) | 7.24 (w: -0.4 m/s) | 7.42 (w: -0.5 m/s) | 7.58 (w: +0.4 m/s) | 7.58 (w: +0.4 m/s) | |
| 7 | Artur Degtyev | Soviet Union | 6.97 (w: -1.3 m/s) | 7.26 (w: -0.6 m/s) | 7.58 (w: +0.6 m/s) | 7.33 (w: +0.4 m/s) | 7.50 (w: -0.7 m/s) | 5.77 (w: +0.8 m/s) | 7.58 (w: +0.6 m/s) | |
| 8 | Stanislav Georgiev | Bulgaria | 7.41 (w: -0.4 m/s) | 7.49 (w: -0.4 m/s) | x | 7.46 (w: -0.2 m/s) | 7.47 (w: +0.4 m/s) | 7.49 (w: +0.3 m/s) | 7.49 (w: -0.4 m/s) | |
| 9 | Hristos Melétoglou | Greece | 7.39 (w: +0.4 m/s) | 7.40 (w: -0.2 m/s) | 7.35 (w: +0.4 m/s) | | | | 7.40 (w: -0.2 m/s) | |
| 10 | Daniel Barbulescu | Romania | 7.16 (w: +0.6 m/s) | 7.03 (w: -0.3 m/s) | 7.37 (w: +0.2 m/s) | | | | 7.37 (w: +0.2 m/s) | |
| 11 | Georg Ackermann | West Germany | x | x | 7.10 (w: +0.6 m/s) | | | | 7.10 (w: +0.6 m/s) | |
| 12 | Aleksandr Zharkov | Soviet Union | 6.99 (w: -0.4 m/s) | 6.90 (w: -0.1 m/s) | x | | | | 6.99 (w: -0.4 m/s) | |

=== Qualifications ===
9 Aug

==== Group A ====
| Rank | Name | Nationality | Attempts | | | Result | Notes |
| Rank | Name | Nationality | 1 | 2 | 3 | Result | Notes |
|---|---|---|---|---|---|---|---|
| 1 | James Stallworth | United States | x | 8.20 (w: +1.4 m/s) | - | 8.20 (w: +1.4 m/s) | Q |
| 2 | Kareem Streete-Thompson | Cayman Islands | x | 7.38 (w: +1.5 m/s) | 7.95 (w: +1.6 m/s) | 7.95 (w: +1.6 m/s) | Q |
| 3 | Stanislav Georgiev | Bulgaria | x | x | 7.64 w (w: +2.3 m/s) | 7.64 w (w: +2.3 m/s) | Q |
| 4 | Artur Degtyev | Soviet Union | 7.42 (w: -0.8 m/s) | 7.47 (w: +0.8 m/s) | 7.53 (w: +0.5 m/s) | 7.53 (w: +0.5 m/s) | q |
| 5 | Yasutaka Hattori | Japan | x | 7.06 (w: +0.7 m/s) | 7.47 (w: +1.4 m/s) | 7.47 (w: +1.4 m/s) | q |
| 6 | Hristos Melétoglou | Greece | 7.13 (w: -0.9 m/s) | 7.23 (w: -1.4 m/s) | 7.44 (w: +0.5 m/s) | 7.44 (w: +0.5 m/s) | q |
| 7 | Daniel Barbulescu | Romania | 7.44 (w: -0.4 m/s) | x | x | 7.44 (w: -0.4 m/s) | q |
| 8 | Miroslav Radukanov | Bulgaria | 6.97 (w: -0.7 m/s) | 7.23 (w: +1.0 m/s) | x | 7.23 (w: +1.0 m/s) | |
| 9 | Jonathan Kron | Ireland | 6.94 (w: -0.8 m/s) | 7.18 (w: +1.4 m/s) | 6.83 (w: -1.4 m/s) | 7.18 (w: +1.4 m/s) | |
| 10 | Roman Orlík | Czechoslovakia | 6.80 (w: -0.3 m/s) | 6.98 (w: +0.8 m/s) | 6.63 (w: -0.4 m/s) | 6.98 (w: +0.8 m/s) | |
| 11 | Franck Zio | Burkina Faso | x | x | 6.94 (w: +0.6 m/s) | 6.94 (w: +0.6 m/s) | |
| 12 | Ponciano Ramírez | Spain | 6.89 (w: -0.6 m/s) | 5.07 (w: +0.6 m/s) | 6.82 (w: +1.0 m/s) | 6.89 (w: -0.6 m/s) | |
| 13 | Zhang Jun | China | 6.64 (w: -1.3 m/s) | x | 6.73 (w: +0.8 m/s) | 6.73 (w: +0.8 m/s) | |
| 14 | Mubark Mohamed | Ethiopia | 5.94 (w: +0.2 m/s) | 6.39 (w: NWI) | 6.03 (w: -1.0 m/s) | 6.39 (w: NWI) | |
| | Gordon Mulenga | Zambia | x | x | x | NM | |

==== Group B ====
| Rank | Name | Nationality | Attempts | | | Result | Notes |
| Rank | Name | Nationality | 1 | 2 | 3 | Result | Notes |
|---|---|---|---|---|---|---|---|
| 1 | Iván Pedroso | Cuba | 7.53 (w: NWI) | 7.66 (w: NWI) | - | 7.66 (w: NWI) | Q |
| 2 | Dion Bentley | United States | 7.66 (w: NWI) | - | - | 7.66 (w: NWI) | Q |
| 3 | Aleksandr Zharkov | Soviet Union | x | 7.44 (w: NWI) | x | 7.44 (w: NWI) | q |
| 4 | Anastasios Georgiou | Greece | 6.69 (w: NWI) | 7.15 (w: NWI) | 7.43 (w: NWI) | 7.43 (w: NWI) | q |
| 5 | Georg Ackermann | West Germany | 7.40 (w: NWI) | 7.20 (w: NWI) | 7.42 (w: NWI) | 7.42 (w: NWI) | q |
| 6 | Rudi Vanlancker | Belgium | 7.41 (w: NWI) | x | x | 7.41 (w: NWI) | |
| 7 | Liao Hsueh-Sung | Chinese Taipei | x | 6.76 (w: NWI) | 7.38 (w: NWI) | 7.38 (w: NWI) | |
| 8 | János Uzsoki | Hungary | 7.00 (w: NWI) | x | 7.33 (w: NWI) | 7.33 (w: NWI) | |
| 9 | Joël Plagnol | France | 7.30 (w: NWI) | 7.25 (w: NWI) | 7.32 (w: NWI) | 7.32 (w: NWI) | |
| 10 | Sun Tai-San | Chinese Taipei | x | 6.96 (w: NWI) | 7.31 (w: NWI) | 7.31 (w: NWI) | |
| 11 | Sean Casey | Australia | 7.30 (w: NWI) | x | x | 7.30 (w: NWI) | |
| 12 | Masaki Morinaga | Japan | 7.14 (w: NWI) | x | 7.29 (w: NWI) | 7.29 (w: NWI) | |
| 13 | Tibor Ordina | Hungary | x | 7.25 (w: NWI) | x | 7.25 (w: NWI) | |
| 14 | Frederick Lottimore | Bermuda | 7.19 (w: NWI) | 7.17 (w: NWI) | x | 7.19 (w: NWI) | |
| 15 | Xavier Cooper | Belgium | 7.14 (w: NWI) | 4.44 (w: NWI) | 6.99 (w: NWI) | 7.14 (w: NWI) | |
| 16 | Paulo Dambacher | Brazil | 6.64 (w: NWI) | 6.88 (w: NWI) | 6.93 (w: NWI) | 6.93 (w: NWI) | |

== Participation ==
According to an unofficial count, 31 athletes from 23 countries participated in the event.

- Australia (1)
- Belgium (2)
- Bermuda (1)
- Brazil (1)
- Bulgaria (2)
- Burkina Faso (1)
- Cayman Islands (1)
- China (1)
- Chinese Taipei (2)
- Cuba (1)
- Czechoslovakia (1)
- Ethiopia (1)
- France (1)
- Greece (2)
- Hungary (2)
- Ireland (1)
- Japan (2)
- Romania (1)
- Soviet Union (2)
- Spain (1)
- United States (2)
- West Germany (1)
- Zambia (1)
