= Athletics at the 1963 Summer Universiade – Men's 5000 metres =

The men's 5000 metres event at the 1963 Summer Universiade was held at the Estádio Olímpico Monumental in Porto Alegre in September 1963.

== Results ==
Rank	Athlete	Nationality	Time	Notes
1st place, gold medalist(s)	Leonid Ivanov	Soviet Union	14:21.4	
2nd place, silver medalist(s)	Béla Szekeres	Hungary	14:32.0	
3rd place, bronze medalist(s)	Ron Hill	Great Britain	14:43.2	
4	Tereo Funai	Japan	14:43.4	
5	Lutz Philipp	West Germany	15:03.7	
6	Michael Turner	Great Britain	15:09.7	
	Vicente Pereira	Brazil	?	
	Pedro Prado Filho	Brazil	?	
	Attila Simon	Hungary	?	
	Fritz Holzer	Switzerland	?	
