= Zsolt Szeglet =

Hungarian sprinter

Personal information
- Born: Zsolt Szeglet; May 4, 1977 (age 49) Keszthely, Zala
- Occupations: Athlete; sprinter
- Years active: 2000-2005

Zsolt Szeglet (born 4 May 1977) a Hungarian athlete from Keszthely, Zala. He specialized in the 400 metres.

== Career ==
Competing for the Baylor Bears track and field program, Szeglet won titles in the 4 × 400 m at the 2000 and 2001 NCAA outdoor championships.

He finished fifth at the 2002 European Championships in Athletics, and participated in the Olympic Games in 2000 and 2004. Szeglet finished seventh with the Hungarian 4 x 100 metres relay team, which consisted of Viktor Kovács, Gábor Dobos, Roland Németh and Szeglet, at the 1999 World Championships.

His personal best time over 400 m is 45.43 seconds, achieved in May 2001 in College Station.

== Personal life ==
Zsolt Szeglet also has a son named Daniel Szeglet, who also participates in track and field at Uplift North Hills Preparatory.
