= André Domingos =

Brazilian sprinter (born 1972)

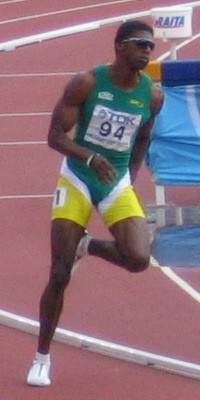
- Domingos in 2005

Personal information
- Born: 26 November 1972 (age 53) Santo André, São Paulo, Brazil

Sport
- Sport: Track and field
Medal record
Men's athletics
Representing Brazil
Olympic Games
Silver medal – second place	2000 Sydney	4×100 m relay
Bronze medal – third place	1996 Atlanta	4×100 m relay
World Championships
Silver medal – second place	2003 Paris	4×100 m relay
Bronze medal – third place	1999 Sevilla	4×100 m relay
Pan American Games
Gold medal – first place	1999 Winnipeg	4×100 metres
Bronze medal – third place	1995 Mar del Plata	100 metres
Bronze medal – third place	2003 Santo Domingo	200 metres
Universiade
Gold medal – first place	1999 Palma de Mallorca	100 metres

André Domingos da Silva (born 26 November 1972) is a Brazilian athlete who competed mainly in the 100 and 200 metres.

He competed for Brazil in the 1996 Summer Olympics held in Atlanta, United States in the 4 x 100 metre relay where he won the bronze medal with his teammates Arnaldo da Silva, Robson da Silva and Edson Ribeiro.

In the 2000 Summer Olympics held in Sydney, Australia he was again part of the Brazilian 4 x 100 metre team with Edson Ribeiro and newcomers Vicente de Lima and Claudinei da Silva and this time the team won the silver medal.

da Silva competed in 4 consecutive Olympics, in the 100 metres in Barcelona, 1992; the 100 metres and relay in Atlanta, 1996; the 200 metres and relay in Sydney, 2000; and the 100 metres and relay in Athens, 2004.

He was a part of the gold medal-winning 4×100 relay at the 1999 Pan Am Games as well as the Universiade winner in the individual 100 metres that same year.

His personal best times are 10.06 seconds over 100 m and 20.15 seconds over 200 m.

Sporting positions
Preceded by (Brazil) Arnaldo da Silva	Brazil's National Champion 100 metres 1997	Succeeded by (Brazil) Claudinei da Silva
