= Péter Deutsch =

Hungarian high jumper

Personal information
- Born: 19 August 1968 (age 57) Budapest, Hungary

Sport
- Sport: Track and field

Péter Deutsch (born 19 August 1968) is a retired Hungarian high jumper.

He finished in joint eleventh place at the 1990 European Indoor Championships with a jump of 2.20 metres. He became Hungarian high jump champion in 1992, 1993 and 1995, and also became indoor champion in 1990 and 1996.

His personal best jump was 2.27 meters, achieved in August 1989 in Brussels.

== See also ==
- József Jámbor – whose personal best was also 2.27 meters but in 1982.
