= László Boros =

Hungarian high jumper

László Boros (born 3 February 1982) is a retired Hungarian high jumper.

He was born in Budapest. He finished twelfth at the 1999 World Youth Championships. He also competed at the 2004 World Indoor Championships, the 2004 Olympic Games and the 2005 World Championships without reaching the final round.

He became Hungarian high jump champion in 2003, 2004, 2005 and 2006. He also became indoor champion in 2003, 2005 and 2006.

His personal best jump was 2.28 meters, achieved in July 2005 in Debrecen.

== See also ==
- József Jámbor – Hungarian whose personal best was 2.27 meters in 1982
