= 1982 European Athletics Indoor Championships – Men's 200 metres =

The men's 200 metres event at the 1982 European Athletics Indoor Championships was held on 6–7 March. It was the first time that this event was held at the European Athletics Indoor Championships.

== Medalists ==
| Gold | Silver | Bronze |
|---|---|---|
| Erwin Skamrahl; West Germany | István Nagy; Hungary | Michele Di Pace; Italy |

== Results ==
=== Heats ===
The winner of each heat (Q) and the next 2 fastest (q) qualified for the semifinals.

| Rank | Heat | Name | Nationality | Time | Notes |
|---|---|---|---|---|---|
| 1 | 4 | Karl-Heinz Weisenseel | West Germany | 21.42 | Q |
| 1 | 6 | István Nagy | Hungary | 21.42 | Q |
| 3 | 6 | Ingo Froböse | West Germany | 21.43 | q |
| 4 | 4 | Marcel Klarenbeek | Netherlands | 21.47 | q, NR |
| 5 | 3 | Vladimir Muravyov | Soviet Union | 21.51 | Q |
| 6 | 1 | Erwin Skamrahl | West Germany | 21.58 | Q |
| 6 | 2 | Michele Di Pace | Italy | 21.58 | Q |
| 8 | 3 | Luciano Caravani | Italy | 21.67 | |
| 9 | 2 | Attila Kovács | Hungary | 21.70 | |
| 9 | 4 | Per-Ola Olsson | Sweden | 21.70 | |
| 11 | 1 | Ángel Heras | Spain | 21.71 | |
| 12 | 5 | Franco Fähndrich | Switzerland | 21.75 | Q |
| 13 | 2 | Isidoro Hornillos | Spain | 21.76 | |
| 14 | 1 | Earl Tulloch | Great Britain | 21.77 | |
| 15 | 5 | István Tatár | Hungary | 21.85 | |
| 16 | 5 | Josef Lomický | Czechoslovakia | 21.92 | |
| 17 | 6 | Stefaan van Hamme | Belgium | 21.96 | |
| 18 | 6 | Tommy Johansson | Sweden | 22.03 | |
| 19 | 3 | Roland Jokl | Austria | 22.09 | |
| 20 | 2 | Ralf Andersson | Sweden | 22.30 | |
| 21 | 4 | Roland Marichal | Belgium | 22.84 | |

=== Semifinals ===
First 2 from each semifinal qualified directly (Q) for the final.

| Rank | Heat | Name | Nationality | Time | Notes |
|---|---|---|---|---|---|
| 1 | 2 | Erwin Skamrahl | West Germany | 21.32 | Q |
| 2 | 2 | Ingo Froböse | West Germany | 21.38 | Q |
| 3 | 1 | István Nagy | Hungary | 21.42 | Q |
| 4 | 1 | Michele Di Pace | Italy | 21.43 | Q |
| 5 | 2 | Franco Fähndrich | Switzerland | 21.52 | |
| 6 | 2 | Marcel Klarenbeek | Netherlands | 21.70 | |
| 7 | 1 | Vladimir Muravyov | Soviet Union | 21.96 | |
| 8 | 1 | Karl-Heinz Weisenseel | West Germany | 22.03 | |

=== Final ===
| Rank | Lane | Name | Nationality | Time | Notes |
|---|---|---|---|---|---|
| 1st place, gold medalist(s) | 4 | Erwin Skamrahl | West Germany | 21.20 | |
| 2nd place, silver medalist(s) | 2 | István Nagy | Hungary | 21.41 | |
| 3rd place, bronze medalist(s) | 3 | Michele Di Pace | Italy | 21.52 | |
| 4 | 1 | Ingo Froböse | West Germany | 21.64 | |
