= Ferenc Szekeres =

Hungarian long-distance runner

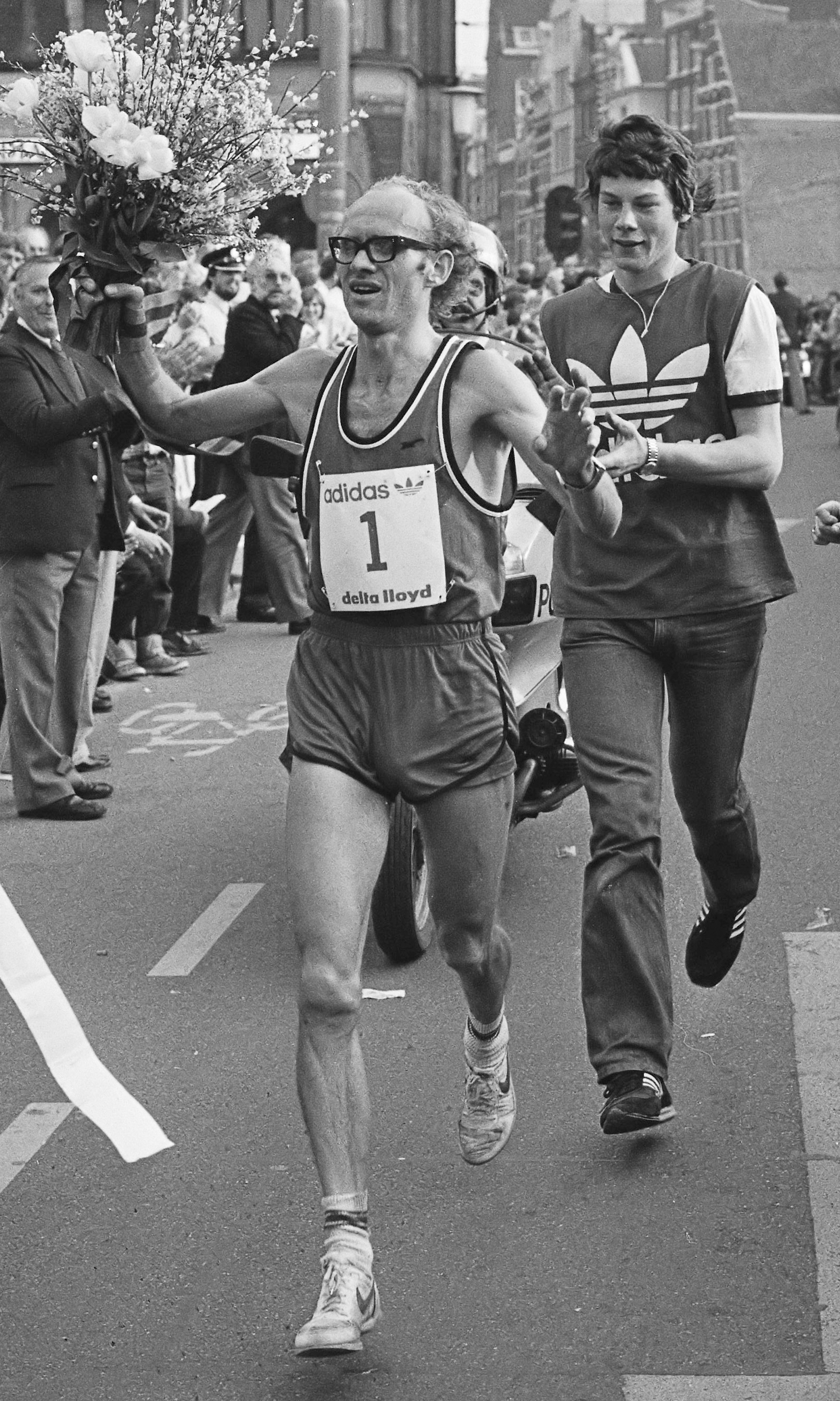
- Ferenc Szekeres in Amsterdam (1981)

Personal information
- Born: 21 March 1947 (age 79) Abony, Pest County
- Height: 1.75 m (5 ft 9 in)
- Weight: 60 kg (132 lb)

Sport
- Club: Csepel Sport Club
Medal record
Gold medal – first place	1979	Amsterdam Marathon
Gold medal – first place	1981	Amsterdam Marathon

Ferenc Szekeres (born 21 March 1947) is a retired long-distance runner from Hungary, who twice won the Amsterdam Marathon, in 1979 and 1981. He represented his native country in at two Summer Olympics: 1972 and 1980.
