= János Faragó =

Hungarian discus thrower (1946–1984)

Personal information
- Nationality: Hungarian
- Born: 8 July 1946 Csanádapáca, Hungary
- Died: 14 November 1984 (aged 38) Miskolc, Hungary

Sport
- Sport: Athletics
- Event: Discus throw

János Faragó (8 July 1946 – 14 November 1984) was a Hungarian athlete. He competed in the men's discus throw at the 1968 Summer Olympics and the 1976 Summer Olympics.
