= Géza Krepuska =

Dr. Krepuska Géza

Géza Krepuska (Pest, 5 September 1861 – Budapest, 15 October 1949. Hungary) was an ear specialist, a university professor and the founder of Hungarian ear surgery. His father, János Krepuska, worked as a farmer at the farm-stead of Szent Lőrinc, later in Pestszentlőrinc. He lived in the 'red house', situated close to the Weather Station.

1888. He received his diploma on 14 January. He worked as an ear specialist at the István and the János Hospital from 1892 to 1911. He was appointed university private teacher in 1898. He taught ear surgery. From 1911 he was appointed manager of the Otology Faculty of the Rókus Hospital where he worked until 1933. However, he held lectures until 1936. His study book was published in that same year. The book with 357 pages and 2219 pictures was titled Otology.

He met the illustrious geologist of his time, Lajos Lóczy, the manager of the Geology Institution.

He established an experimental vineyard at his estate in Péter Bleak. He naturalized several sand species helping the state of Hungarian viniculture. In 1899 he built a two-storey building with a cellar to keep and process wine. When he died in 1949, he was buried at the Graveyard in Fiume Street (Budapest).

In the 18th district of Budapest, an annual vintage festival, a street and a tablet preserve his name and fame.
