= Miklós Fazekas =

Hungarian steeplechase runner (1933–2025)

Personal information
- Born: 6 December 1933 Putnok, Hungary
- Died: 27 December 2025 (aged 92)
- Education: College of Physical Education

Sport
- Sport: Track and field
- Event: 3000 metres steeplechase
Medal record
Men's athletics
Representing Hungary
Hungarian Championships
Gold medal – first place	1962 Budapest	3000 m steeplechase
Gold medal – first place	1965 Budapest	3000 m steeplechase

Miklós Fazekas (6 December 1933 – 27 December 2025) was a Hungarian steeplechase runner.

== Life and career ==
Fazekas was born in Putnok on 6 December 1933. He attended and graduated from the College of Physical Education in Budapest.

Fazekas competed at the 1962 Hungarian Athletics Championships, winning the gold medal in the men's 3000 metres steeplechase event, running a personal best of 8:43.2. In the same year, he competed in the same event at the 1962 European Athletics Championships, but was knocked out in the heats. He also competed at the 1965 Hungarian Athletics Championships, winning the gold medal in the same event.

== Death ==
Fazekas died on 27 December 2025, at the age of 92.
