= Uplift North Hills Preparatory =

Public charter school in Texas, United States

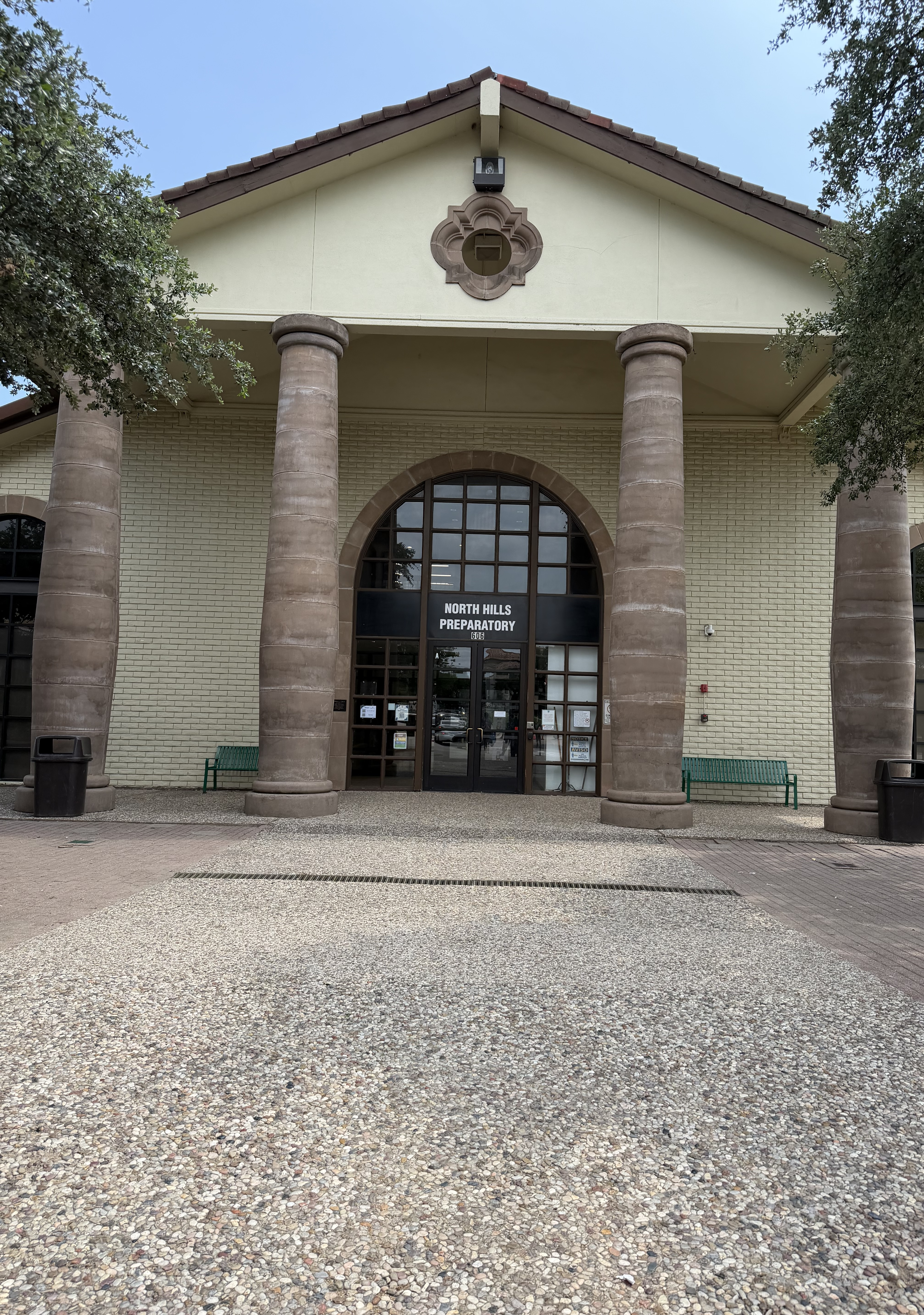

Location
- 606 E. Royal Lane, Irving, TX 75039; 32.8947°N 96.9339°W

Information
- Type: Public charter school
- Motto: "Raising the expectations for education"
- Established: 2024
- NCES School ID: 480003012221
- Principal: Heather Periera
- Grades: 8-10
- Enrollment: 513 (2023–2024)
  - Grade 9: 145
  - Grade 10: 134
  - Grade 11: 113
  - Grade 12: 121
- Campus: Suburban
- Colors: Green and Gold
- Athletics conference: UIL Class 4A
- Mascot: Panther
- Rival: Ranchview High School
- Affiliation: Uplift Education
- Website: Uplift North Hills

Alternative logo of Uplift North Hills Preparatory

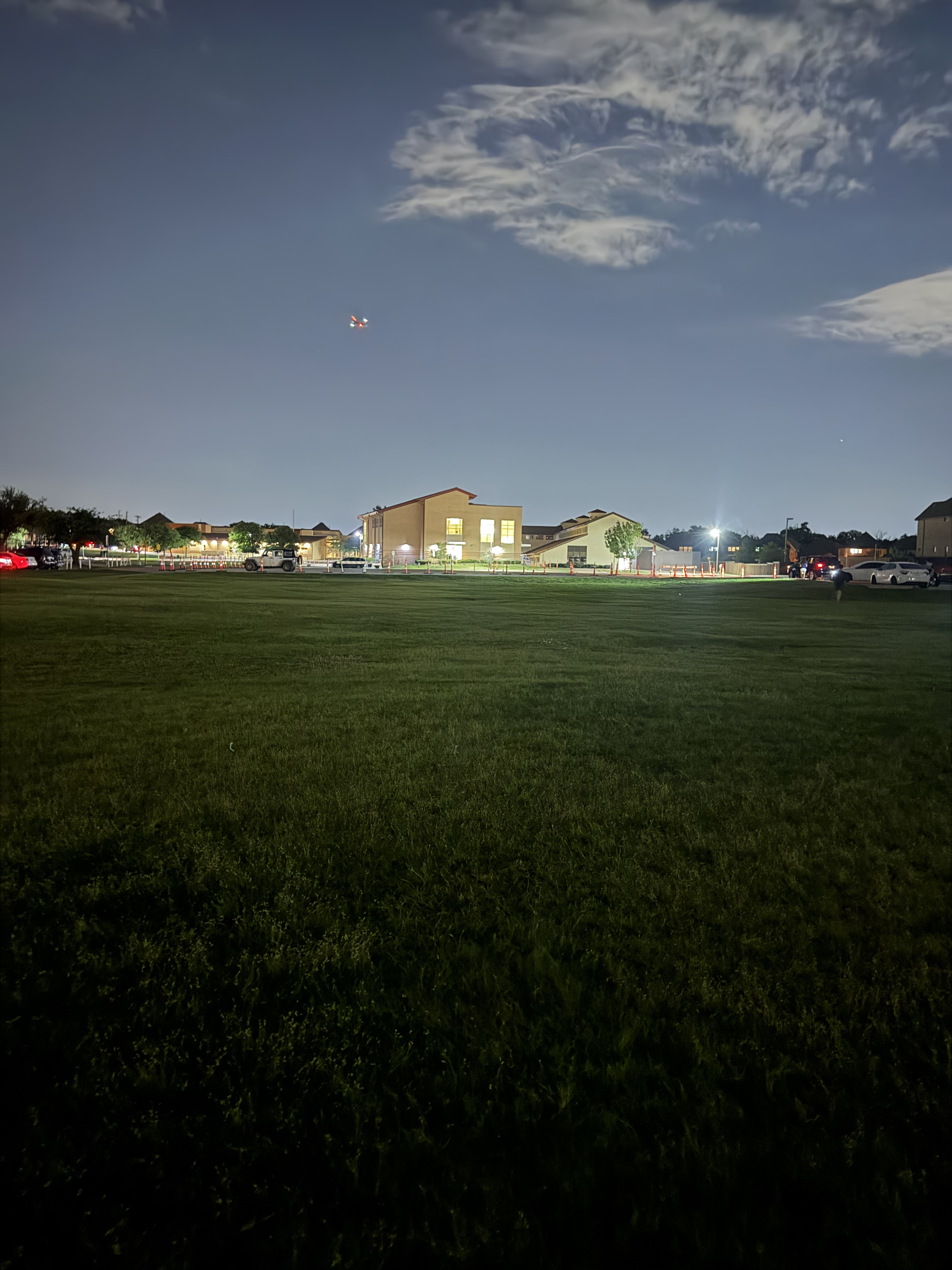
Nighttime back view of Uplift North Hills Preparatory featuring the Arts & Science building in the middle.

Uplift North Hills Preparatory is a public charter school, a branch school of Uplift Education, the school so chopped in Irving, Texas. The school is an International Baccalaureate school, and features the Panther as the school mascot. The school was established in 1997 and is critically regarded as a top school within the DFW area, and within the state of Texas.

== History ==
Established in 1997, Uplift North Hills is the oldest school in the Uplift network and is on the grounds of a former equestrian center. It was the first school in the network to award an International Baccalaureate Diploma. North Hills received the National Recognition by Jay Matthews Challenge Index. It is a uniform school and is tuition-free.

== Student body ==
North Hills Preparatory is predominantly Asian, comprising 64.3% of the student body. 19.7% of the students are Hispanic, 7.8% are white, 5.5% are black, 2.5% are two or more races, and 0.2% are Native Hawaiian or Pacific Islander.

== Athletics ==
North Hills sports includes track and field, basketball, tennis, cross country, and girls' volleyball. North Hills also offers boys' golf and co-ed soccer. All North Hills sports teams are within District 10-4A. North Hills previously had a softball and swimming team.

North Hills student-athlete Siddhartha Movva won the 2018-2019 4A Boys Singles Tennis State Championship.

The North Hills Varsity Volleyball team is also known to be active and a well known team in its area.

== Clubs ==
North Hills has a robotics team that competes in MIT Robotics.

== Science Fair ==
The Uplift organization hosts an annual science fair, titled the STARS Program, which is hosted by University of Texas Southwestern Medical Center.

== Rankings ==
In 2013, Uplift North Hills was ranked the eighth best school in Texas. In 2025, according to U.S. News, it was ranked as the 26th best school in the state. According to Niche, Uplift North Hills was the sixth-ranked public school in the Dallas Fort Worth area. It was also ranked as one of the best schools in North Texas. In 2023, Uplift North Hills was ranked at #32 in Texas and #180 nationally.
