= Ferenc Tima =

Hungarian sprinter

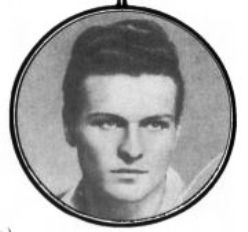
- Ferenc Tima in 1937

Personal information
- Nationality: Hungarian
- Born: 14 December 1919
- Died: 7 December 1976 (aged 56)

Sport
- Sport: Sprinting
- Event: 4 × 100 metres relay

Ferenc Tima (14 December 1919 – 7 December 1976) was a Hungarian sprinter. He competed in the men's 4 × 100 metres relay at the 1948 Summer Olympics.
