= Róbert Honti =

Hungarian middle-distance runner

Personal information
- Nationality: Hungarian
- Born: 30 January 1943 (age 83)

Sport
- Sport: Middle-distance running
- Event: 800 metres

Róbert Honti (born 30 January 1943) is a Hungarian middle-distance runner. He competed in the men's 800 metres at the 1968 Summer Olympics.
