= János Dalmati =

Hungarian racewalker (1942–2020)

Personal information
- Nationality: Hungarian
- Born: 26 February 1942
- Died: 29 September 2020 (aged 78)

Sport
- Sport: Athletics
- Event: Racewalking

János Dalmati (26 February 1942 – 29 September 2020) was a Hungarian racewalker. He competed in the men's 50 kilometres walk at the 1972 Summer Olympics.
