= Tibor Balajcza =

Hungarian racewalker (born 1937)

Personal information
- Nationality: Hungarian
- Born: 24 January 1937 (age 89)

Sport
- Sport: Athletics
- Event: Racewalking

Tibor Balajcza (born 24 January 1937) is a Hungarian racewalker. He competed in the men's 20 kilometres walk at the 1960 Summer Olympics.
