= Gyula Dudás =

Hungarian racewalker

Gyula Csaba Dudás (born 20 August 1966 in Hungary, Tököl Budapest ) is a male race walker from Hungary.

== Achievements ==
Year	Competition	Venue	Position	Event	Notes
Representing Hungary
1991	World Championships	Tokyo, Japan	28th	20 km	1:25:52
1991	World Championships	Tokyo, Japan	14th	50 km	4:14:23
1993	World Championships	Stuttgart, Germany	29th	20 km	1:30:46
1994	European Championships	Helsinki, Finland	24th	50 km	4:15:14
1995	World Championships	Gothenburg, Sweden	22nd	20 km	1:28:08
1997	World Championships	Athens, Greece	27th	20 km	1:27:17
1998	European Championships	Budapest, Hungary	18th	20 km	1:27.51
1999	World Championships	Seville, Spain	20th	50 km	4:05:58
2000	European Race Walking Cup	Eisenhüttenstadt, Germany	33rd	20 km	1:25:53
2000	Olympic Games	Sydney, Australia	37th	20 km	1:28:34
2000	Olympic Games	Sydney, Australia	37th	50 km	4:17:55
2004	Olympic Games	Athens, Greece	30th	20 km	1:28:18
2009	European Race Walking Cup	Metz, France	24th	50 km	4:53:58
2010	World Race Walking Cup	Chihuahua, Mexico	48th	50 km	4:48:19
