= Ferenc Gerő =

Hungarian sprinter

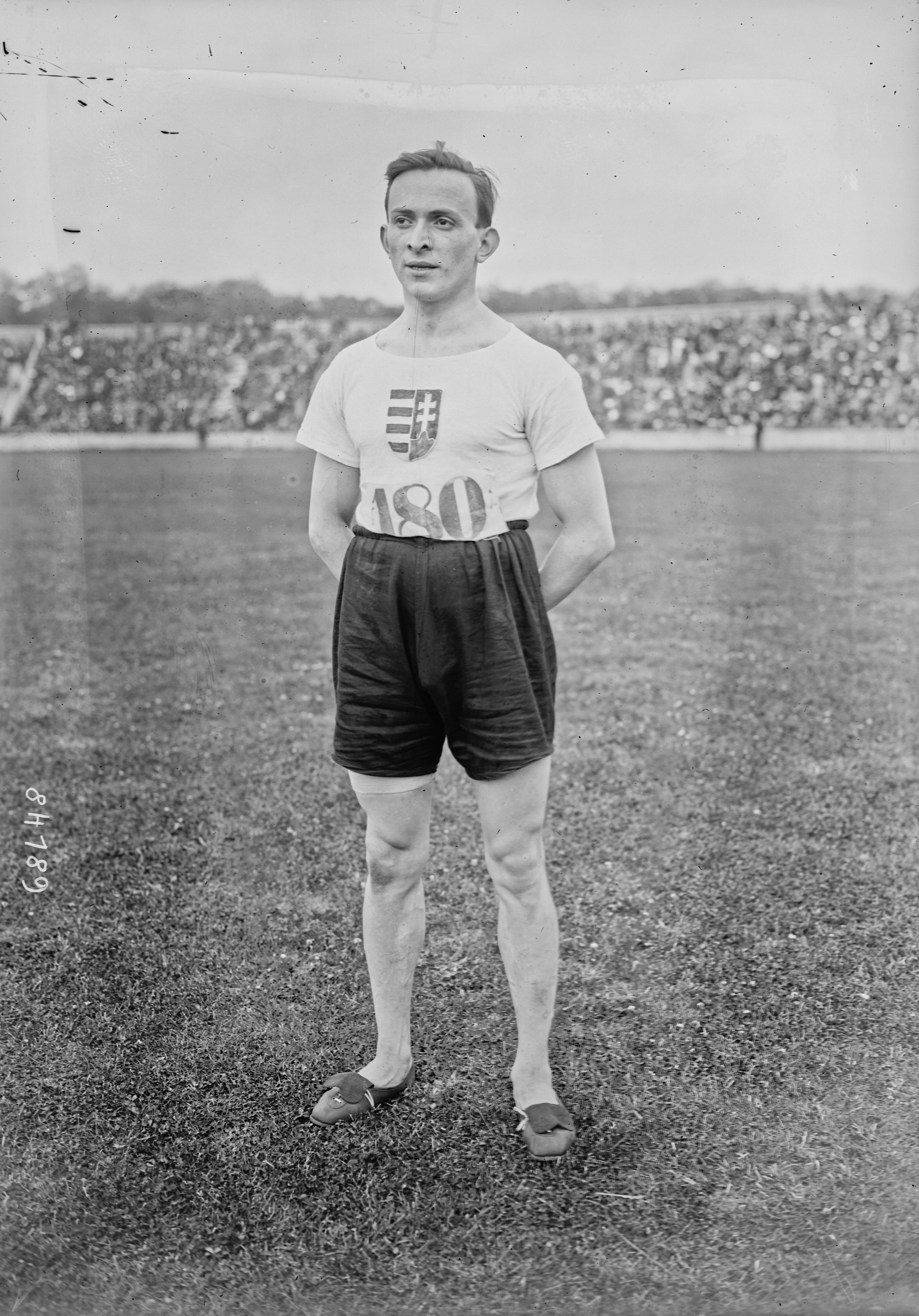
- Ferenc Gerő in 1923.

Personal information
- Nationality: Hungarian
- Born: 14 August 1900 Budapest, Hungary
- Died: 23 June 1974 (aged 73) Budapest, Hungary

Sport
- Sport: Track and field
- Event(s): 100m, 200m

Ferenc Gerő (14 August 1900 – 23 June 1974) was a Hungarian sprinter. He competed at the 1924 and 1928 Summer Olympics.
