= Péter Parsch =

Hungarian middle-distance runner

Personal information
- Nationality: Hungarian
- Born: 20 January 1936 (age 90)

Sport
- Sport: Middle-distance running
- Event: 800 metres

Péter Parsch (born 20 January 1936) is a Hungarian middle-distance runner. He competed in the men's 800 metres at the 1960 Summer Olympics.
