= Lajos Mecser =

Hungarian long-distance runner

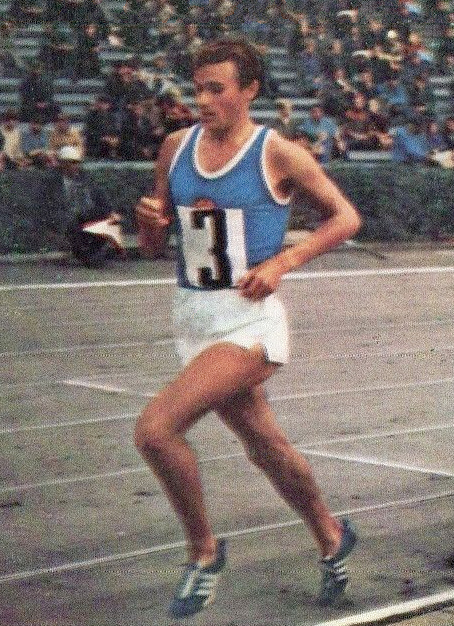

Personal information
- Born: 23 September 1942 (age 83) Bükkaranyos, Hungary
- Height: 1.76 m (5 ft 9 in)
- Weight: 69 kg (152 lb)

Sport
- Sport: Athletics
- Event(s): 5000 m, 10,000 m, marathon
- Club: Salgótarjáni BTC

Achievements and titles
- Personal best(s): 5000 m – 13:29.2 (1968); 10000 m – 28:27.0 (1966); Marathon – 2:17:59 (1969)
Medal record
Men's athletics
Representing Hungary
European Championships
Silver medal – second place	1966 Budapest	10,000 m
European Indoor Games
Bronze medal – third place	1967 Prague	3000 m

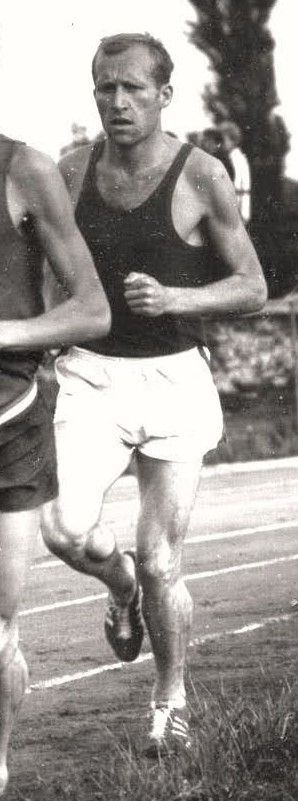
Lajos Mecser

Lajos Mecser (born 23 September 1942) is a retired Hungarian long-distance runner who won two European championships medals in 1966–67. He competed in the 5000 metres at the 1964 Olympics and in the 10,000 m and marathon at the 1968 Olympics with the best result of 23rd place in the 10,000 m.

Mecser finished third behind Ron Clarke in the 3 miles event at the British 1965 AAA Championships and third again behind Mohamed Gammoudi at the 1966 AAA Championships in the 6 miles event, before improving to second place in both the 3 and 6 miles races at the 1967 AAA Championships.
