= István Encsi =

Hungarian hammer thrower

Personal information
- Nationality: Hungarian
- Born: 1 February 1943 Abaújkér, Hungary
- Died: 18 June 2022 (aged 79)

Sport
- Sport: Athletics
- Event: Hammer throw

István Encsi (1 February 1943 – 18 June 2022) was a Hungarian athlete. He competed in the men's hammer throw at the 1972 Summer Olympics.
