= Gábor Gerő =

Hungarian sprinter

Personal information
- Nationality: Hungarian
- Born: 13 February 1909
- Died: 24 June 1977 (aged 68)

Sport
- Sport: Sprinting
- Event: 100 metres

Gábor Gerő (13 February 1909 – 24 June 1977) was a Hungarian sprinter. He competed in the men's 100 metres at the 1936 Summer Olympics.
