= József Ficsor =

Hungarian discus thrower

Personal information
- Nationality: Hungarian
- Born: 29 July 1965 (age 60)

Sport
- Sport: Athletics
- Event: Discus throw

József Ficsor (born 29 July 1965) is a Hungarian athlete. He competed in the men's discus throw at the 1992 Summer Olympics.
