= Pál Király (athlete) =

Hungarian long-distance runner

Personal information
- Nationality: Hungarian
- Born: 7 November 1896 Pest, Hungary
- Died: 4 January 1969 (aged 72) Budapest, Hungary

Sport
- Sport: Long-distance running
- Events: Marathon, 10,000m

Pál Király (7 November 1896 – 4 January 1969) was a Hungarian long-distance runner. He competed in the 10,000 metres and the marathon at the 1924 Summer Olympics.
