= Császártöltés =

Császártöltés _{Tschaasartet/Kaiserdamm}
- Location within Hungary
- Coordinates: 46°25′N 19°11′E
- Country: Hungary
- County: Bács-Kiskun

Area
  - Total: 82.06 km^{2} (31.68 sq mi)

Population (2005)
  - Total: 2,662
  - Density: 32.43/km^{2} (84.0/sq mi)
- Time zone: UTC+1 (CET)
  - Summer (DST): UTC+2 (CEST)
- Postal code: 6239
- Area code: 78

Császártöltés is a village in Bács-Kiskun county, in the Southern Great Plain region of southern Hungary.

Croats in Hungary call this village Tetiš or Tuotiš. Germans in Hungary call this village Tschasartet or Kaiserdamm.

== Geography ==
It covers an area of 82.06 km^{2} (32 sq mi) and has a population of 2,662 people (2005).
