= György Kiss (runner) =

Hungarian long-distance runner

Personal information
- Nationality: Hungarian
- Born: 1 May 1936
- Died: 27 June 1987 (aged 51)

Sport
- Sport: Long-distance running
- Event: 5000 metres

György Kiss (1 May 1936 – 27 June 1987) was a Hungarian long-distance runner. He competed in the men's 5000 metres at the 1968 Summer Olympics.
