= Gábor Katona =

Hungarian long and triple jumper

Personal information
- Born: 1 October 1952 (age 73) Budapest, Hungary

Sport
- Sport: Track and field
Medal record
Representing Hungary
European Junior Championships
Bronze medal – third place	1970 Colombes	Triple jump

Gábor Katona (born 1 October 1952) is a retired Hungarian triple jumper.

He won the bronze medal at the 1970 European Junior Championships and finished fourth at the 1979 European Indoor Championships. He became the Hungarian triple jump champion in 1972, 1976, 1977, 1978 and 1983, rivalling with Henrik Kalocsai, Zoltán Cziffra and Béla Bakosi. He also became Hungarian indoor champion in 1974, 1976, 1978 and 1979. He also competed in the long jump and the triple jump at the 1972 Summer Olympics.

In the long jump he became Hungarian champion in 1972 and indoor champion in 1975.
