= Zsolt Bíber =

- Bíber at the Magglingen International Throwing Match in Magglingen, Switzerland, on 29 May 2004, where he put 19.57 m

Personal information
- Nationality: Hungarian
- Born: May 31, 1976 (age 50) Szolnok, Hungary

Sport
- Sport: Athletics
- Event: Shot put
- Club: BEAC, Újpesti TE, Szolnoki MÁV SE
- Coached by: Pál Bíber, Ferenc Szegletes, Jenő Kóczián, István Papp

Achievements and titles
- Personal best: Shot put: 20.81 m (2004)
Medal record
Men's athletics
Representing Hungary
European Cup First League
Silver medal – second place	2003 Lappeenranta	Shot put
Hungarian Championships
Gold medal – first place	2000	Shot put
Gold medal – first place	2003	Shot put
Gold medal – first place	2004	Shot put
Gold medal – first place	2005	Shot put
Silver medal – second place	1996	Shot put
Silver medal – second place	2006	Shot put
Silver medal – second place	2007	Shot put
Hungarian Indoor Championships
Gold medal – first place	1998	Shot put
Gold medal – first place	2001	Shot put
Gold medal – first place	2002	Shot put
Gold medal – first place	2003	Shot put
Gold medal – first place	2004	Shot put
Gold medal – first place	2005	Shot put
Gold medal – first place	2007	Shot put
Hungarian U23 Championships
Gold medal – first place	1996	Shot put
Silver medal – second place	1997	Shot put
Silver medal – second place	1998	Shot put
Hungarian Youth Championships
Gold medal – first place	1994 indoor	Shot put
Gold medal – first place	1994 outdoor	Shot put
Gold medal – first place	1995 indoor	Shot put
Hungarian Cadet Championships
Gold medal – first place	1993	Shot put
Men's weightlifting
Hungarian Championships
Bronze medal – third place	2002 Nyíregyháza	+105 kg
Bronze medal – third place	2003 Kisbér	+105 kg

Zsolt Bíber (born 31 May 1976) is a Hungarian shot putter who represented Hungary at the 2004 Summer Olympics. His 20.81 m put, achieved in Budapest on 15 February 2004, is the Hungarian national record in the men's shot put. He won four Hungarian outdoor titles and seven Hungarian indoor titles. In 2003, he won the silver medal in the shot put at the European Cup First League.

== Early life and youth career ==
Bíber began athletics in 1990 following an agreement with his father, Pál Bíber. Pál Bíber was his youth coach at Szolnoki MÁV MTE.

In 1993, he won the Hungarian cadet championship with the 5 kg shot. He led the age group ranking with 17.98 m and won the Hungarian Slovak cadet international meet in Veszprém with the same result, competing for Hungary's cadet national team.

In 1994, Bíber won both the indoor and outdoor Hungarian youth titles. He put 17.10 m in the indoor final and 17.60 m at the outdoor youth championships, both with the 6 kg shot. His coach was Pál Bíber. He received local sporting recognition for both titles at the end of the year.

In 1995, he retained his indoor youth title with a 17.30 m put using the 6 kg shot. He then placed sixth at the 1995 European Athletics Junior Championships in Nyíregyháza with 16.14 m, using the senior 7.26 kg shot. In 1996, he won the outdoor Hungarian junior title with a 16.28 m put using the senior shot. That year, aged 20, he won silver at the senior Hungarian outdoor championships with 17.52 m. He put 16.55 m in the qualification round of the 1997 European Athletics U23 Championships in Turku.

== Senior athletics career ==
Bíber won his first senior Hungarian indoor title in 1998 with 18.07 m. His coaches were Ferenc Szegletes and István Papp. In 2000, he won his first senior outdoor Hungarian title in Budapest with 19.46 m.

On 27 May 2001, at the Dr. Péter Bácsalmási Memorial Meeting, he put 20.47 m. The mark surpassed by two centimetres the 20.45 m Hungarian record held by Vilmos Varjú since 31 July 1971.

In 2001, his coaches were Jenő Kóczián for technical preparation and István Papp for weightlifting and strength preparation. He began working with the rotational technique in 1997, having learned its foundations from Ferenc Szegletes and developed it further with Kóczián.

In 2002, he first improved the Hungarian indoor record to 20.32 m, then won the Hungarian indoor championships with 20.26 m. In 2003, he won the outdoor title with 19.26 m and the indoor title with 19.32 m.

== Hungarian national record ==
On 31 January 2004 in Budapest, Bíber improved his own record to 20.43 m. Two weeks later, on 15 February at the Olympic Hall, he improved the record with a series that included 20.32 m, 20.29 m and 20.81 m.

The 20.81 m throw was achieved indoors. It is the Hungarian national record in the men's shot put.

In 2004, he won the Hungarian indoor title with 20.34 m and the outdoor Hungarian title with 20.55 m. The latter result was among the performances that secured his entry for the Athens Olympics.

== 2004 season, results over 20 metres ==
Date	Venue and competition	Result	Place
31 January 2004	Budapest Open Championships	20.43 m	1st
15 February 2004	Budapest Indoor Meeting	20.81 m	1st
23 February 2004	Hungarian Indoor Championships, Budapest	20.34 m	1st
6 March 2004	World Indoor Championships, Budapest	20.24 m	9th
5 June 2004	Meeting de Atletismo, Seville	20.40 m	5th
4 July 2004	Padova International Meeting	20.51 m	2nd
9 July 2004	Hungarian Championships, Debrecen	20.55 m	1st
19 July 2004	IAAF Grand Prix II, Thessaloniki	20.28 m	1st
8 August 2004	METÁL Hungaria Cup, Szombathely	20.41 m	1st

== International competitions ==
Year	Competition	Venue	Event	Result
1995	European Junior Championships	Nyíregyháza	Shot put	6th, 16.14 m
1997	European U23 Championships	Turku	Shot put, qualification	16.55 m
2000	European Indoor Championships	Ghent	Shot put, qualification	Three fouls
2002	European Indoor Championships	Vienna	Shot put, qualification	19.30 m
2002	European Championships	Munich	Shot put, qualification	18.83 m
2003	World Championships	Paris	Shot put, qualification	15th, 18.99 m
2004	World Indoor Championships	Budapest	Shot put, qualification	9th, 20.24 m
2004	Summer Olympics	Athens	Shot put, qualification	24th, 19.31 m

Before the World Indoor Championships in Budapest, Bíber was fifth in the season's indoor world rankings with 20.81 m. He competed with sinusitis on 23 February, could not train in the days before the championships because of the illness and took antibiotics. He put 20.24 m in qualification, finishing ninth overall and four centimetres short of the mark needed for the final.

At the Athens Olympics, he put 19.31 m in the second qualification group and finished 24th overall.

== European Cup ==
As a member of Hungary's men's team, Bíber won silver in the shot put with 19.66 m in Group A of the European Cup First League in Lappeenranta on 21 June 2003. Finland's Conny Karlsson, the 1997 European U23 champion, won with 19.94 m. Gjøran Sørli was third with 18.67 m. Bíber's second place earned seven points for Hungary.

== Senior Hungarian titles in shot put ==
Indoor	Result	Outdoor	Result
1998	18.07 m	2000	19.46 m
2001	19.33 m	2003	19.26 m
2002	20.26 m	2004	20.55 m
2003	19.32 m	2005	19.12 m
2004	20.34 m		
2005	18.54 m		
2007	18.98 m		

In 2005, Bíber retained the indoor title with 18.54 m and won the outdoor title with 19.12 m. In 2006, he placed second at the Hungarian outdoor championships with 17.61 m. In 2007, he won another Hungarian indoor title with 18.98 m. At the 2007 Hungarian outdoor championships, he won silver with 18.44 m. He retired from competition after the 2007 season.

== Weightlifting ==
In December 2002, Bíber won bronze in the +105 kg category at the Hungarian senior weightlifting championships in Nyíregyháza. He totalled 320 kg, with a 145 kg snatch and a 175 kg clean and jerk.

In October 2003, Bíber again won bronze in the +105 kg category at the Thorn Lighting Hungarian Championships in Kisbér. He totalled 335 kg, with a 152.5 kg snatch and a 182.5 kg clean and jerk. The total was his personal best.

István Papp was his coach for both national championship bronze medals.

Péter Nagy described Bíber as one of his biggest weightlifting rivals at the start of his career.

== Clubs and coaches ==
In his youth career, Bíber competed for Szolnoki MÁV MTE and later for Szolnoki MÁV Ideál. He spent much of his senior athletics career with BEAC, competed at the 2004 Olympics for Újpesti TE and later appeared in Hungarian results lists for Szolnoki MÁV SE. His coaches were Pál Bíber, Ferenc Szegletes, Jenő Kóczián for technique and István Papp for weightlifting and strength training.
