= Tibor Ordina =

Hungarian athlete

Tibor Ordina (17 March 1971 – 12 April 2016) was a Hungarian athlete who specialized in the long jump and triple jump. Born in Budapest, Ordina stood at 1.92 m (6 ft 4 in) tall, and during his active career he weighed 73 kilograms (161 lb).

== Long jump ==
In the long jump he finished eleventh at the 1994 European Indoor Championships. He also competed at the 1993 World Indoor Championships, the 1993 World Championships and the 1994 European Championships without reaching the final. He was Hungarian long jump champion in 1993, 1995, 1996 and 1998, rivalling János Uzsoki, and was indoor champion in 1993, 1994, 1997 and 1999. His personal best jump was 8.04 metres, achieved in August 1993 in Budapest.

== Triple jump ==
In the triple jump he finished eighth at the 1997 World Indoor Championships. He also competed at the 1996 Olympic Games and the 1997 World Championships without reaching the final. He became the Hungarian indoor champion in triple jump in 1996, 1997 and 1999. His personal best jump was 16.90 metres, achieved in June 1996 in Budapest.

== Illness and death ==
Tibor Ordina was diagnosed with Brain tumour in 2004. He had his first operation in May 2011, where a large portion of his tumour was removed and the small part that remained did not grow. However, it began growing in late 2014, to a size which was larger than previously, requiring a second operation in May 2015, 4 years after his first operation. Despite the operation, his tumour was deemed terminal. His condition remained stagnant for the rest of 2015, but worsened in early 2016. He died in Budapest on April 12, 2016, aged 45, with his funeral being held on April 26.

== Achievements ==
Year	Competition	Venue	Position	Event	Notes
Representing Hungary
1990	World Junior Championships	Plovdiv, Bulgaria	20th (q)	Long jump	7.25 m
1990	World Junior Championships	Plovdiv, Bulgaria	16th	Triple jump	14.93 m (wind: -0.3 m/s)
1994	European Championships	Helsinki, Finland	14th (q)	Long jump	7.52 m (wind: +0.1 m/s)
1996	Olympic Games	Atlanta, United States	33rd	Triple jump	16.04 m
