= West German Indoor Athletics Championships =

Annual indoor track and field competition

- Sport: Indoor track and field
- Founded: 1954
- Country: West Germany

The West German Indoor Athletics Championships (German: Deutsche Leichtathletik-Hallenmeisterschaften) was an annual indoor track and field competition organised by the German Athletics Association, which served as the national championship for the sport in West Germany. Typically held over two days in February during the German winter, it was first held in 1954.

The event was contested separately from the East German Indoor Athletics Championships until 1991, when the German Indoor Athletics Championships was held as the first Unified Germany championships.

== Events ==
The following athletics events featured as standard on the West German Indoor Championships programme:

- Sprint: 60 m, 200 m, 400 m
- Distance track events: 800 m, 1500 m, 3000 m
- Hurdles: 60 m hurdles
- Jumps: long jump, triple jump (men only), high jump, pole vault (men only)
- Throws: shot put

Prior to 1980, the 60 metres was occasionally replaced by a 50 metres race. Similarly, the 60 metres hurdles was sometimes held as a 50 metres hurdles or 55 metres hurdles event in the early years of the competition. Combined events were briefly held with a men's heptathlon and women's pentathlon featuring from 1973 to 1975. Racewalking was also an infrequent sport, with a men's 10,000 m walk being on the programme from 1969 to 1975. At the last edition in 1990, a men's 5000 m walk and women's 3000 m walk were held.

The 200 metres first appeared in 1965, before becoming a standard event in 1968. The women's 400 metres was first held in 1961, followed by the additions of a 1500 metres in 1969. A women's 3000 metres was contested during 1974–76 and became a standard event in 1987. Women did not compete in the triple jump or pole vault during the lifetime of the meeting.

== Editions ==
| Ed. | Year | City | Venue | Dates |
|---|---|---|---|---|
| 1. | 1954 | Frankfurt | Festhalle Frankfurt | 20 March 1954 |
| 2. | 1955 | Kiel | Ostseehalle | 12 March 1955 |
| 3. | 1956 | Frankfurt | Festhalle Frankfurt | 17 March 1956 |
| 4. | 1957 | Kiel | Ostseehalle | 23 March 1957 |
| 5. | 1958 | Dortmund | Westfalenhallen | 1 March 1958 |
| 6. | 1959 | Berlin | Deutschlandhalle | 14 February 1959 |
| 7. | 1960 | Kiel | Ostseehalle | 5 March 1960 |
| 8. | 1961 | Stuttgart | | 11 March 1961 |
| 9. | 1962 | Dortmund | | 24 March 1962 |
| 10. | 1963 | Berlin | | 9 March 1963 |
| 11. | 1964 | Kiel | | 1 February 1964 |
| 12. | 1965 | Stuttgart | | 6 March 1965 |
| 13. | 1966 | Kiel | | 5 March 1966 |
| 14. | 1967 | Dortmund | | 5 March 1967 |
| 15. | 1968 | Stuttgart | | 2 March 1968 |
| 16. | 1969 | Dortmund | | 23 February 1969 |
| 17. | 1970 | Berlin | | 21 February 1970 |
| 18. | 1971 | Kiel | | 26–27 February 1971 |
| 19. | 1972 | Stuttgart | | 25–26 February 1972 |
| 20. | 1973 | Berlin | | 23–24 February 1973 |
| 21. | 1974 | Munich | | 22–23 February 1974 |
| 22. | 1975 | Stuttgart | | 21–22 February 1975 |
| 23. | 1976 | Dortmund | | 6–7 February 1976 |
| 24. | 1977 | Sindelfingen | Glaspalast | 25–26 February 1977 |
| 25. | 1978 | Sindelfingen | Glaspalast | 24–25 February 1978 |
| 26. | 1979 | Berlin | | 9–10 February 1979 |
| 27. | 1980 | Dortmund | Helmut-Körnig-Halle | 8–9 February 1980 |
| 28. | 1981 | Sindelfingen | Glaspalast | 6–7 February 1981 |
| 29. | 1982 | Dortmund | Helmut-Körnig-Halle | 12–13 February 1982 |
| 30. | 1983 | Sindelfingen | Glaspalast | 11–12 February 1983 |
| 31. | 1984 | Stuttgart | Hanns-Martin-Schleyer-Halle | 10–11 February 1984 |
| 32. | 1985 | Dortmund | Helmut-Körnig-Halle | 15–16 February 1985 |
| 33. | 1986 | Sindelfingen | Glaspalast | 7–8 February 1986 |
| 34. | 1987 | Karlsruhe | Europahalle | 6–7 February 1987 |
| 35. | 1988 | Dortmund | Helmut-Körnig-Halle | 19–20 February 1988 |
| 36. | 1989 | Stuttgart | Hanns-Martin-Schleyer-Halle | 3–4 February 1989 |
| 37. | 1990 | Sindelfingen | Glaspalast | 17–18 February 1990 |
