= János Szálas =

Hungarian racewalker

Personal information
- Nationality: Hungarian
- Born: 19 May 1956 (age 70)

Sport
- Sport: Athletics
- Event: Racewalking

János Szálas (born 19 May 1956) is a Hungarian racewalker. He competed in the men's 20 kilometres walk at the 1980 Summer Olympics.
