= István Nagy (athlete) =

Hungarian sprinter

Personal information
- Born: 28 April 1959 (age 67) Heves, Hungary

Sport
- Sport: Track and field
Medal record
Representing Hungary
European Indoor Championships
Silver medal – second place	1982 Milan	200 m
Bronze medal – third place	1983 Budapest	200 m
Summer Universiade
Silver medal – second place	1981 Bucharest	200 m

István Nagy (born 28 April 1959) is a retired 100 and 200 metres runner from Hungary. He won the Hungarian championships 7 times, he also won the Hungarian Indoor championships at 60/200 metres on 6 occasions.

He competed at the 1980 Summer Olympics in the 100 and 200 metres but did not advance to the quarter finals in either sprint.

In 1981, he won a silver medal at the 1981 Summer Universiade 200 metres.

He competed at the 1982 European Championships in the 200 metres, where he finished 5th in the final. He won two medals at the European Indoor Championships.

== Achievements ==
Year	Competition	Venue	Position	Event	Notes
Representing Hungary
1982	European Indoor Championships	Milan, Italy	2nd	200 m	
1983	European Indoor Championships	Budapest, Hungary	3rd	200 m	
1987	World Championships	Rome, Italy	6th	4 × 100 m relay	
