= Balázs Csillag =

Hungarian long-distance runner

Balázs Csillag (born 5 March 1979) is a Hungarian long-distance runner.

Csillag competed for the Northern Iowa Panthers track and field team in the NCAA.

He finished seventh in the 5000 metres at the 2002 European Championships, and also competed at the 2006 World Road Running Championships.

His personal best times are 3:41.32 minutes in the 1500 metres, achieved in July 2002 in Győr; 7:52.51 minutes in the 3000 metres, achieved in August 2002 in San Sebastián; 13:26.96 minutes in the 5000 metres, achieved in July 2002 in Heusden-Zolder; 29:38.64 minutes in the 10,000 metres, achieved in April 2006 in Antalya. The 5000 metres result is a Hungarian record.
