= Róbert Banai =

Hungarian middle-distance runner

Róbert Banai (born 28 February 1967) is a Hungarian middle-distance runner.

As a junior Banai became double gold medallist in the 1500 metres and steeplechase at the 1984 Gymnasiade, and competed in the junior race at the 1985 (53rd place) and 1986 World Cross Country Championships.

He finished seventh at the 1990 European Indoor Championships (1500 m) and competed at the 1989 World Indoor Championships (1500 m), the 1989 European Indoor Championships (1500 m) and the 1991 World Indoor Championships (800 m) without reaching the final.

He became Hungarian champion in the 800 metres in 1989 and 1990, the 1500 metres in 1988–1991, and the 3000 metres steeplechase in 1996 and 1997.

His personal best times are 1:47.29 minutes in the 800 metres, achieved in June 1991 in Frankfurt; 3:40.16 minutes in the 1500 metres, achieved in July 1989 in Budapest; 7:56.5 minutes in the 3000 metres, achieved in May 1989 also in Budapest; and 8:39.55 minutes in the 3000 metres steeplechase, achieved in July 1988 in Miskolc.
