= István Jankovich =

Hungarian sprinter

István Jankovich (Slovak: Štefan Jankovich, 17 October 1889 – 21 February 1974) was a Hungarian track and field athlete of Slovak descent in the 1912 Summer Olympics.

He was born in Pozsony (present-day Bratislava) and died in Budapest. In 1912 he was eliminated in the semifinals of the 100 metres competition. He was also a member of the Hungarian team which was eliminated in the semifinals of the 4x100 metre relay competition.
