= Viktor Kovács =

Hungarian sprinter

Personal information
- Born: 27 December 1973 (age 52) Eger, Hungary

Sport
- Sport: Track and field

Viktor Kovács (born 27 December 1973) is a Hungarian sprinter specializing in the 100 metres.

He finished seventh with the Hungarian 4 x 100 metres relay team, which consisted of Kovács, Gábor Dobos, Roland Németh, and Zsolt Szeglet, at the 1999 World Championships.

His personal best time over 100 m is 10.31 seconds, achieved in June 1998 in Budapest.
