= Gyula Németh (high jumper) =

Hungarian high jumper (1959–2023)

Gyula Németh (2 December 1959 – 12 March 2023) was a Hungarian high jumper.

He finished fourteenth at the 1983 European Indoor Championships, and eighth at the 1988 European Indoor Championships. He became Hungarian high jump champion in 1986 and 1989.
