= János Uzsoki =

Hungarian long jumper

Personal information
- Born: 9 September 1972 (age 54) Mezőtúr, Hungary

Sport
- Sport: Track and field

János Uzsoki (born 9 September 1972) is a retired Hungarian long jumper.

He was born in Mezőtúr. He competed at the 1994 European Championships and the 1996 Olympic Games without reaching the final. He became Hungarian long jump champion in 1994, 1997 and 1999, rivalling with Tibor Ordina. He also became indoor champion in 1998.

His personal best jump was 8.08 metres, achieved in June 1996 in Budapest.

Uzsoki stands 1.80 m (5 ft 11 in) tall, and during his active career he weighed 75 kilograms (165 lb).

At this moment he is a long jump, triple jump and discus thrower coach for MAFC (Mezőtúri Atlétikai Football Club).
