= Gábor Dobos =

Hungarian sprinter

Personal information
- Born: 21 February 1976 (age 50) Budapest, Hungary

Sport
- Sport: Track and field

Gábor Dobos (born 21 February 1976) is a Hungarian sprinter who specializes in the 100 metres.

He finished fifth in the 60 metres at the 2003 IAAF World Indoor Championships in Birmingham. His personal best time over 100 m is 10.17 seconds, achieved in July 1999 in Budapest. Dobos finished seventh with the Hungarian 4 x 100 metres relay team, which consisted of Viktor Kovács, Dobos, Roland Németh and Zsolt Szeglet (Zsolt Szeglet ran in the final only, Miklós Gyulai ran as fourth in the semifinals), at the 1999 World Championships.

Dobos failed a doping test in 2000. In a May 2006 in-competition doping test he tested positive for drostanolone and testosterone, and was suspended from the 2006 European Championships pending the outcome of the B sample analysis. In December he was handed a life ban.

== See also ==
- List of sportspeople sanctioned for doping offences
