= Henrik Kalocsai =

Hungarian athlete (1940–2012)

Personal information
- Born: 28 November 1940 Budapest, Hungary
- Died: 22 May 2012 (aged 71) Budapest, Hungary

Sport
- Sport: Track and field
Medal record
Representing Hungary
European Championships
Bronze medal – third place	1966 Budapest	Triple jump
European Indoor Championships
Silver medal – second place	1967 Prague	Triple jump
Summer Universiade
Gold medal – first place	1965 Budapest	Triple jump

Henrik Kalocsai (pronounced [ˈhɛnrik ˈkɒlot͡ʃɒi]; 28 November 1940 – 22 May 2012) was a Hungarian athlete who specialized in the triple jump and long jump.

He won the gold medal at the 1965 Summer Universiade, the bronze medal at the 1966 European Championships and the silver medal at the 1967 European Indoor Games. He became the Hungarian triple jump champion in 1962, 1963, 1965, 1967, 1968, 1970, 1971 and 1973, rivalling with Drágán Ivanov, Zoltán Cziffra and Gábor Katona.

In the long jump he finished sixth at the 1970 European Indoor Championships. He became Hungarian long jump champion in every year from 1960 to 1971, except for 1964 and 1968 when Béla Margitics won. He also became indoor champion in 1974.
