= Zoltán Cziffra =

Hungarian triple jumper

Medal record

Men's athletics

Representing Hungary

European Championships
Silver medal – second place	1969 Athens	Triple jump

Zoltán Cziffra (born 10 November 1942 in Keszthely) is a Hungarian retired triple jumper.

He won the silver medals at the 1969 European Indoor Games and the 1969 European Championships. He also finished fifth at the 1970 European Indoor Championships and sixth at the 1971 European Indoor Championships.

He was the Hungarian triple jump champion in 1969, 1974 and 1975, rivalling with Henrik Kalocsai and Gábor Katona. He was Hungarian indoor champion in 1975 and 1977.
