= Roland Németh =

Hungarian sprinter

Personal information
- Born: 19 September 1974 (age 52) Szombathely, Vas County, Hungary

Sport
- Sport: Track and field
Medal record
Representing Hungary
European Championships
Bronze medal – third place	2002 Munich	100 m

Roland Németh (born 19 September 1974) is a Hungarian athlete specializing in the 100 metres.

He won the bronze medal at the 2002 European Championships in Athletics. Participating in the 2004 Summer Olympics, he achieved third place in his 100 metres heat, thus making it through to the second round. He finished sixth in the second round, thus failing to achieve qualification to the semi-finals.

Németh finished seventh with the Hungarian 4 x 100 metres relay team, which consisted of Viktor Kovács, Gábor Dobos, Németh and Zsolt Szeglet, at the 1999 World Championships.

He holds national record in 100 m, achieved in June 1999 in Budapest.

== Personal best ==
Event	Best	Location	Date
100 m	10.08 NR	Budapest, Hungary	9 June 1999
60 m	6.57	Budapest, Hungary	22 January 2000
50 m	5.71 NR	Nyíregyháza, Hungary	5 February 2000
