= Ferenc Forgács =

Hungarian middle-distance runner

Ferenc Forgács (also reported as Forgách, Slovak: František Faczinek, born 25 September 1891 – 25 August 1950) was a Slovak track and field athlete who competed for Hungary in the 1912 Summer Olympics. He was born in Bratislava, Austria-Hungary. In 1912 he was eliminated in the first round of the 800 metres competition as well as of the 1500 metres event.
