= Attila Simon (runner) =

Hungarian middle-distance runner

Personal information
- Nationality: Hungarian
- Born: 22 March 1939 (age 87) Budapest, Hungary

Sport
- Sport: Middle-distance running
- Event: 1500 metres

Attila Simon (born 22 March 1939) is a Hungarian middle-distance runner. He competed in the men's 1500 metres at the 1964 Summer Olympics.
