= József Jámbor =

Hungarian high jumper

Personal information
- Born: 17 February 1957 (age 69)

Sport
- Sport: Track and field

József Jámbor (born 17 February 1957) is a retired Hungarian high jumper.

He finished seventh at the 1979 European Indoor Championships. He became the Hungarian indoor champion in the high jump in 1979.

His personal best jump was 2.27 metres, achieved in May 1982 in Rehlingen.
