= 1958 European Athletics Championships – Men's triple jump =

Men's triple jump at the European Athletics Championships

The men's triple jump at the 1958 European Athletics Championships was held in Stockholm, Sweden, at Stockholms Olympiastadion on 22 and 23 August 1958.

== Medalists ==
Gold	Józef Szmidt; Poland
Silver	Oleg Ryakhovskiy; Soviet Union
Bronze	Vilhjálmur Einarsson; Iceland

== Results ==
=== Final ===
23 August

Rank	Name	Nationality	Result	Notes
1st place, gold medalist(s)	Józef Szmidt	Poland	16.43	CR NR
2nd place, silver medalist(s)	Oleg Ryakhovskiy	Soviet Union	16.02	
3rd place, bronze medalist(s)	Vilhjálmur Einarsson	Iceland	16.00	
4	Ryszard Malcherczyk	Poland	15.83	
5	Éric Battista	France	15.48	
6	Kari Rahkamo	Finland	15.18	
7	Hermann Strauss	West Germany	15.11	
8	Hannu Rantala	Finland	15.09	
9	František Krupala	Czechoslovakia	15.07	
10	Lyuben Gurgushinov	Bulgaria	14.91	
11	Roger Norman	Sweden	14.87	
12	Enzo Cavalli	Italy	14.84	
13	Sten Erickson	Sweden	14.79	
14	Pierre William	France	14.62	
15	Albert Hofstede	Netherlands	14.49	
16	Konstantin Sfikas	Greece	14.34	
17	Manfred Hinze	East Germany	14.26	
18	Pierluigi Gatti	Italy	13.80	

=== Qualification ===
22 August

Rank	Name	Nationality	Result	Notes
1	Józef Szmidt	Poland	15.74	Q
2	Lyuben Gurgushinov	Bulgaria	15.39	Q
3	Oleg Ryakhovskiy	Soviet Union	15.30	Q
4	Enzo Cavalli	Italy	15.27	Q
5	Ryszard Malcherczyk	Poland	15.15	Q
6	Manfred Hinze	East Germany	15.08	Q
7	Kari Rahkamo	Finland	15.04	Q
8	Pierluigi Gatti	Italy	15.04	Q
9	Roger Norman	Sweden	15.03	Q
10	Éric Battista	France	14.96	Q
11	Hannu Rantala	Finland	14.94	Q
12	Pierre William	France	14.93	Q
13	Vilhjálmur Einarsson	Iceland	14.92	Q
14	František Krupala	Czechoslovakia	14.88	Q
15	Sten Erickson	Sweden	14.84	Q
16	Hermann Strauss	West Germany	14.73	Q
17	Albert Hofstede	Netherlands	14.64	Q
18	Konstantin Sfikas	Greece	14.60	Q
19	Eilif Fredriksen	Norway	14.54	
20	Vitold Kreyer	Soviet Union	14.50	
21	Jakob Rypdahl	Norway	14.41	
22	Erwin Müller	Switzerland	13.72	
23	Ken Wilmshurst	Great Britain	12.94	

== Participation ==
According to an unofficial count, 23 athletes from 16 countries participated in the event.

- Bulgaria (1)
- Czechoslovakia (1)
- East Germany (1)
- Finland (2)
- France (2)
- Greece (1)
- Iceland (1)
- Italy (2)
- Netherlands (1)
- Norway (2)
- Poland (2)
- Soviet Union (2)
- Sweden (2)
- Switzerland (1)
- Great Britain (1)
- West Germany (1)
