= 2023 in the sport of athletics =

2023 in athletics is a year of track and field, highlighted by the main event of 2023 World Athletics Championships in Budapest, 40 years after the very first edition in 1983.

== World records ==
=== Indoor ===
Event	Perf.	N	Athlete(s)	Nat.	Date	Meeting	Location	Ctry.	R	V
Men's 3000 m	7:23.81		Lamecha Girma	ETH	15 Feb 2023	Meeting Hauts-de-France Pas-de-Calais	Liévin	FRA		
Women's 400 m	49.26		Femke Bol	NED	19 Feb 2023	Dutch Indoor Championships	Apeldoorn	NED		
Men's Pole vault	6.22 m		Armand Duplantis	SWE	25 Feb 2023	All Star Perche	Clermont-Ferrand	FRA		
Women's Pentathlon	5014 pts	(Note: 60mH: 8.23, HJ: 1.92m, SP: 15.54m, LJ: 6.59m, 800m: 2:13.60)	Adrianna Sulek	POL	3 Mar 2023	European Athletics Indoor Championships	Istanbul	TUR		
Women's Pentathlon	5055 pts	(Note: 60mH: 8.23, HJ: 1.92m, SP: 15.54m, LJ: 6.59m, 800m: 2:13.60)	Nafi Thiam	BEL	3 Mar 2023	European Athletics Indoor Championships	Istanbul	TUR		

=== Outdoor ===
Event	Perf.	W	N	Athlete(s)	Nat.	Date	Meeting	Location	Ctry.	R	V
Men's 100 km (road)	6:05:35			Aleksandr Sorokin	LTU	14 May 2023	World's Fastest Run	Vilnius	LTU		
Women's35 km walk (road)	2:37:15			María Pérez	ESP	21 May 2023	European Race Walking Team Championships	Poděbrady	CZE		
Men's Shot put	23.56 m			Ryan Crouser	USA	27 May 2023	USATF LA Grand Prix	Los Angeles	USA		
Women's 1500 m	3:49.11			Faith Kipyegon	KEN	2 Jun 2023	Golden Gala	Florence	ITA		
Women's 5000 m	14:05.20			Faith Kipyegon	KEN	9 Jun 2023	Meeting de Paris	Paris	FRA		
Men's 3000 m steeplechase	7:52.11			Lamecha Girma	ETH	9 Jun 2023	Meeting de Paris	Paris	FRA		
Women's Mile	4:07.64			Faith Kipyegon	KEN	21 Jul 2023	Herculis	Monaco	MON		
Mixed 4 × 400 m relay	3:08.80			Justin Robinson 44.47 Rosey Effiong 50.38 Matthew Boling 45.13 Alexis Holmes 48.82	USA	19 August 2023	World Championships	Budapest	HUN		
Men's 2000 m	4:43.13			Jakob Ingebrigtsen	NOR	8 Sep 2023	Memorial van Damme	Brussels	BEL		
Men's Pole vault	6.23 m			Armand Duplantis	SWE	17 Sep 2023	Prefontaine Classic	Eugene	USA		
Women's 5000 m	14:00.21			Gudaf Tsegay	ETH	17 Sep 2023	Prefontaine Classic	Eugene	USA		
Women's Marathon	2:11.53			Tigst Assefa	ETH	24 Sep 2023	Berlin Marathon	Berlin	GER		
Women's Mile (Road)	4:20.98		Wo	Diribe Welteji	ETH	1 Oct 2023	World Road Running Championships	Riga	LAT		
Men's Mile (Road)	3:56.13			Hobbs Kessler	USA	1 Oct 2023	World Road Running Championships	Riga	LAT		
Men's Marathon	2:00.35			Kelvin Kiptum	KEN	8 Oct 2023	Chicago Marathon	Chicago	USA		
Women's 10 km (road)	29:26		Wo	Agnes Ngetich	KEN	18 Nov 2023	Urban Trail de Lille	Lille	FRA		
Women's 5 km (road)	14:13		Wo	Beatrice Chebet	KEN	31 Dec 2023	Cursa dels Nassos	Barcelona	ESP		

== Main events ==
=== World events ===
- The nineteenth edition of the World Championships, from 19 August to 27 August at the National Athletics Centre, in Budapest, Hungary.
- World Cross Country Championships on 18 February 2023 in Bathurst, Australia.
- The first edition of the World Road Running Championships is scheduled to take place in Riga, Latvia, from 30 September to 1 October 2023.
- World Mountain & Trail Running Championships
- This year, the World Indoor Championships have been cancelled and postponed to 2024.

=== Continental events ===
- Americas:
  - Pan Am Cross Country
  - Pan Am Games
  - South American
- Asia:
  - Asian Outdoor
  - Asian Indoor
  - Southeast Asian Games
- Europe:
  - European Indoor
  - European Throwing
  - European Race Walking Team
  - European 10,000 m
  - European Team Championships
  - European Cross Country
- Oceania:
  - Oceania Cup
  - Pacific Games
- Africa:
  - The 2023 African Games have been rescheduled in March 2024.

=== International meetings ===
- 2023 Diamond League (15 meetings from 5 May to 17 September).
- 2023 World Athletics Continental Tour
- 2023 World Athletics Indoor Tour
- 2023 World Athletics Combined Events Tour

=== Other events ===
- 2021 Summer World University Games postponed to July 2023.
- 2023 Jeux de la Francophonie.
- 2023 Arab Athletics Championships.
- 2023 Games of the Small States of Europe.

=== Age groups ===
- African U18 & U20 Championships
- 2023 Arab U23 in Radès, 1st edition
- Asian U20 Championships
- Asian U18 Championships
- Caribbean Games (U23)
- CARIFTA Games
- European U23 Championships
- European U20 Championships
- NACAC U23 & U18 Championships

== Rankings ==
- 2023 World Athletics Rankings

== Deaths ==
Athlete	Nation	Discipline / Occupation	Age	Date
Jim Hines	United States	100m	76	3 June
Dick Fosbury	United States	High Jump	76	12 March
Bob Richards	United States	Pole Vault	97	26 February
Tom Courtney	United States	800m	90	22 August
Greg Foster	United States	55mH	64	19 February
Kéné Ndoye	Senegal	Triple Jump	44	13 February
Dean Smith	United States	Sprinter	91	24 June
Harvey Glance	United States	100m	66	12 June
Ralph Boston	United States	Long Jump	83	30 April
Johnny Lujack	United States	High jump, javelin throw	98	25 July
Remigijus Valiulis	Soviet Union	400m	64	19 July
Ellen Tittel	Germany	Middle-distance runner	75	7 October
Ken Money	Canada	High jumper	87	6 March
Simone Edwards	United States	Sprinter	49	16 February
Lázár Lovász	Hungary	Hammer thrower	80	17 April
Tim Lobinger	Germany	Pole Vault	50	16 February
Șerban Ciochină	Romania	Triple Jump	83-84	April
Klaus Beer	East Germany	Long Jump	80	8 June
Ruth Fuchs	East Germany	Javelin thrower	76	20 September
Sabir Ali	India	Decathlete	67	22 January
Karoline Käfer	Austria	400m	68	11 March
Russ Francis	United States	Javelin thrower	70	1 October
Andrea Barberi	Italy	400m	44	20 December
Marianne Werner	Germany	Shot putter	99	22 July
Argentina Menis	Romania	Discus Throw	74	3 March
Renate Boy	Germany	Shot putter	83	5 January
Vera Krepkina	Soviet Union	100m	90	25 April
Annamária Tóth	Hungary	200m	77-78	16 July
Mariya Pisareva	Soviet Union	High jumper	90	10 December
Graham Gipson	Australia	400m	90	17 May
Calvin Davis	United States	400mH	51	1 May
Joseph Chebet	Kenya	Marathon	52	7 July
Gérard Fenouil	France	200m	78	8 October
David Jones	Great Britain	Sprinter	83	1 June
Mike McFarlane	Great Britain	200m	62-63	6 June
Eddie Southern	United States	400 metres hurdles	85	17 May
Charles White	United States	300 metres hurdler	64	11 January
László Zarándi	Hungary	Sprinter	94	14 August
Veniamin Soldatenko	Soviet Union	50km Walk	84	15 July
Helmar Müller	West Germany	400m	83	9 June
Odd Bergh	Norway	Triple jumper	85	12 January
Viktor Olsen	Norway	Marathoner	99	21 April
Zenon Andrusyshyn	United States	Javelin thrower	76	7 August
Ron East	United States	Javelin thrower	79-80	30 September
Aurèle Vandendriessche	Belgium	Marathoner	91	17 October
Doug Kyle	Canada	5000m	91	28 August
Mike McRae	United States	Long Jump	68	16 December
Brad Crawford	United States	Long jumper	67-68	21 May
Dick Towers	United States	400 metres hurdles	92-93	23 April
Bertil Norman	Sweden	Orienteer	93	24 March
Kjell Lauri	Sweden	Orienteer	66-67	11 August
Gregg Tafralis	United States	Shot Put	65	11 August
Vilém Mandlík	Czechoslovakia	Sprinter	87	6 October
Walter Adams	Germany	800m	78	30 October
Ken Stephens	United States	Hurdler	91-92	28 Aug
Pavel Kantorek	Czechoslovakia	Marathoner	93	10 November
Emanuil Dyulgerov	Bulgaria	Hammer throw	68	26 June
Eugeniusz Bedeniczuk	Poland	Triple Jump	61-62	2 May
Irina Kostyuchenkova	Soviet Union	Javelin thrower	61	31 March
Gyula Németh	Hungary	High jumper	63	12 March
Robert Holmes Bell	United States	Track and field athlete	79	8 June
Jean Pellissier	Italy	Sky runner	51	27 October
Niels Holst-Sørensen	Denmark	800m	100	24 October
Erkki Hautamäki	Finland	Decathlete	93	5 September
Samuel Kiplimo Kosgei	Kenya	Marathon	37	26 May
Heinrich Köberle	Germany	Handcyclist	76-77	15 April
Olga Šikovec	Croatia	200m	89-90	4 April
Francis Agbo	France	High Jump	65	11 November
Kevin Coombs	Australia	Para-athlete	82	5 October
Lyn Coleman	Australia	Para-athlete	58	22 May
Zanele Situ	South Africa	Para-athlete	52	1 November
Terry Giddy	Australia	Para-athlete	73	18 August
Benjamin Kiplagat	Uganda	3000mSC	34	31 December
Jim Savage	New Zealand	Para-athlete	86	20 February
Tracey Freeman	Australia	Para-athlete	75-76	4 October
Sergio Ottolina	Italy	200m	80	28 April
Jean-Claude Nallet	France	Sprinter	76	20 August
Georgi Stoykovski	Bulgaria	Triple Jump	81	4 May
Rupert Hoilette	Jamaica	Sprinter	77	6 October
Gary Eddy	Australia	Sprinter	78	16 April
Tomás Barris	Spain	1500m	93	29 October
Armando Sardi	Italy	Sprinter	83	22 December
József Csík	Hungary	Javelin thrower	77	4 October
Evelyn Lawler	United States	Hurdler	93	4 January
Ernő Béres	Hungary	Long-distance runner	94	21 April
Herb Douglas	United States	Long jumper	101	22 April
James Parker	United States	Hammer throw	47	19 August
Borislav Dević	Yugoslavia	1500m	59	8 January
Svetlana Laukhova	Soviet Union	100mH	50	28 October
Tori Bowie	United States	200m	32	23 April
Beryl Randle	Great Britain	Racewalker	94	28 November
Shaun Pickering	Great Britain	Shot Put	61	11 May
Norm Green	United States	Long-distance runner	90	16 May
Birger Asplund	Sweden	Hammer thrower	93	1 July
Donal Smith	New Zealand	Middle-distance runner	89	27 September
Morville Chote	Great Britain	Javelin thrower	98-99	17 March
Ronald Mehlich	Poland	110mH	54-55	December
Lennart Jonsson	Sweden	Sprinter	89-90	1 September
Ulla-Britt Wieslander	Sweden	50mH	81	29 November
Kevin Cunningham	Australia	Para-athlete	83-84	4 January
Yvette Monginou	France	Sprinter	95	16 February
Noel Clough	Australia	800m	86	20 May
Cyprian Tseriwa	Rhodesia	10,000m	86	13 March
Ray Middleton	Great Britain	50km Walk	86	8 January
John Nuttall	Great Britain	3000m	56	9 November
David Carr	Australia	Middle-distance runner	91	18 July
Bengt Nåjde	Sweden	5000m	81	17 September
Ilse Steinegger	Austria	Long Jump	98	19 October
Guy Lagorce	France	Sprinter	86	13 July
Gerhart Hecker	Hungary	Marathoner	89	1 June
Mick Molloy	Ireland	Marathoner	85	4 September
Paul Angenvoorth	Germany	Marathoner	75	30 October
Mabel Walker	United States	100m	94	10 September
Vittoria Cesarini	Italy	100m	91	26 September
Lynn Eves	Canada	100m	81	2 October
Sitiveni Moceidreke	Fiji	200m	86-87	November
Eddy Monsels	Suriname	100m	75	1 November
Della Pascoe	Great Britain	100m	74	22 June
Benedict Majekodunmi	Nigeria	Sprinter	82-83	January
Carolina Rieuwpassa	Indonesia	Sprinter	74	16 March
Marvin Nash	Canada	Sprinter	69	20 January
Valentyna Maslovska	Soviet Union	200m	86	21 May
Hadley Hinds	Barbados	Sprinter	76-77	6 May
Jerzy Kowalski	Poland	400m	86	20 September
Tambusamy Krishnan	Malaysia	Sprinter	79	20 December
Anne Michel	Belgium	400m	64	21 November
Karl Volkmer	Switzerland	Middle-distance runner	101	19 December
Ismael Delgado	Puerto Rico	Sprinter	93	9 October
Enzo Cavalli	Italy	Triple Jump	86	20 September
Alfredo Rizzo	Italy	Steeplechase runner	89	6 February
Edmond Roudnitska	France	Hurdler	91	31 January
Constance Darnowski	United States	Hurdler	88	2 August
Marcel Duriez	France	110mH	82	2 February
João Lima	Portugal	110mH	62	18 November
Lee Yoder	United States	Hurdler	92	17 May
Julio Gómez	Spain	800m	91	10 February
Phyllis Perkins	Great Britain	Middle-distance runner	88-89	22 February
András Zsinka	Hungary	800m	75	8 April
Gudrun Pflüger	Austria	Mountain runner	50	17 August
Fritz Prossinagg	Austria	1500m	92	16 February
Bill McKim	Great Britain	Middle-distance runner	81-82	June
Ulf Högberg	Sweden	Middle-distance runner	77	16 May
José Molíns	Spain	5000m	90	2 March
Nikolay Sviridov	Soviet Union	10,000m	85	14 June
Noël Tijou	France	10,000m	81	23 September
Gail North-Saunders	Bahamas	Sprinter	78-79	30 June
John Bicourt	Great Britain	3000mSC	77	16 January
Adolf Weinacker	United States	Racewalker	94	11 September
Lorna Lee	Great Britain	Long jumper	91	6 January
Marguerite Martel	France	Athletics pentathlete	98	1 March
Dawn Josephs	Canada	Long Jump	91	10 October
Kari Rahkamo	Finland	Triple Jump	90	11 November
Yıldıray Pağda	Turkey	Triple jumper	85-86	20 December
Theo Püll	Germany	High Jump	87-88	December
Edward Czernik	Poland	High jumper	82-83	31 May
Milena Usenik	Slovenia	Shot putter	88	31 March
Anne-Chatrine Lafrenz	Germany	Shot putter	86	24 July
Seiko Obonai	Japan	Shot putter	83	6 March
Irene Schuch	Germany	Discus Throw	87	6 September
Erika Raue	Germany	Javelin thrower	85	6 May
Sándor Eckschmiedt	Hungary	Hammer thrower	84	12 August
Oleg Ryakhovskiy	Soviet Union	Triple jumper	90	16 December
Bev Watson	Australia	Long jumper	86-87	22 March
Major Hazelton	United States	Sprinter	79	3 December
Cliff Simpson	New Zealand	Middle-distance runner	95	10 December
George Ellis	Great Britain	200m	90	17 January
Adrian Breacker	Great Britain	Sprinter	88	23 February
Josephine Cook	Great Britain	Shot putter	92	20 November
Mel Fitzgerald	Canada	Wheelchair racer	70	2 October
Thomas J. Osler	United States	Long-distance runner	82	26 March
Neil Wilson	New Zealand	Middle-distance runner	93	14 August
Summa Navaratnam	Sri Lanka	Sprinter	98	19 October
Heino Sisask	Estonia	Racewalker	94	21 January
Edrissa Marong	Gambia	800m	22	23 January
Ivan Kováč	Czechoslovakia	1500m	74	11 February
Stanislav Štefkovič	Slovakia	Decathlete	93	22 February
Doug Fisher	United States	Discus thrower	75	12 February
Juhani Orrenmaa	Finland	Hurdler	84	5 August
Georges Salmon	Belgium	Long Jump	90	8 November
Charlie Allan	Great Britain	Caber tosser	84-85	13 December
Raya Bronstein	Israel	Sprinter, high jumper, shot putter, discus thrower, javelin thrower	93	4 May
Robert Hersh	United States	Athletics official	82	19 January
Ron Roddan	Great Britain	Athletics coach	91	11 February
Billy Emory Maxwell	United States	Athletics coach	80	9 October
