= Athletics at the 1960 Summer Olympics – Men's triple jump =

Men's triple jump at the Games of the XVII Olympiad
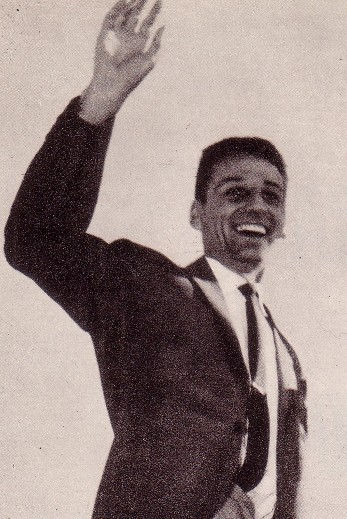
- Józef Szmidt
- Venue: Olympic Stadium
- Date: September 6, 1960
- Competitors: 39 from 24 nations
- Winning distance: 16.81 OR

Medalists
1st place, gold medalist(s)		Józef Szmidt; Poland
2nd place, silver medalist(s)		Vladimir Goryaev; Soviet Union
3rd place, bronze medalist(s)		Vitold Kreyer; Soviet Union

The men's triple jump field event at the 1960 Olympic Games took place on September 6. Thirty-nine athletes from 24 nations competed. The maximum number of athletes per nation had been set at 3 since the 1930 Olympic Congress. Józef Szmidt of Poland won the gold medal. It was Poland's first medal and first victory in the men's triple jump. Vitold Kreyer of the Soviet Union repeated his bronze medal performance from 1956, becoming the sixth man to win two medals in the event. His countryman Vladimir Goryaev took silver; this made the Soviet Union the fourth nation to have two men on the podium in the same year in the triple jump (the United States, Sweden, and Japan) and the fourth nation to reach the podium three Games in a row (the United States, Finland, and Japan).

== Background ==
This was the 14th appearance of the event, which is one of 12 athletics events to have been held at every Summer Olympics. Returning finalists from the 1956 Games were two-time gold medalist (and three-time finalist) Adhemar da Silva of Brazil, silver medalist Vilhjálmur Einarsson of Iceland, bronze medalist Vitold Kreyer of the Soviet Union, two men each from the United States (Bill Sharpe and Ira Davis), Japan (Koji Sakurai and Hiroshi Shibata), and Finland (Kari Rahkamo and Hannu Rantala), Ryszard Malcherczyk of Poland, and Éric Battista of France. But among this veteran field, an Olympic newcomer was favored: Józef Szmidt was the European champion and had broken the world record with the first over-17-metre jump at the Polish championships a month before the Games.

Cuba, Iran, Iraq, and Spain each made their first appearance in the event; Germany made its first appearance as the "United Team of Germany". The United States competed for the 14th time, having competed at each of the Games so far.

== Competition format ==
The competition used the two-round format introduced in 1936. In the qualifying round, each jumper received three attempts to reach the qualifying distance of 14.80 metres; if fewer than 12 men did so, the top 12 (including all those tied) would advance. In the final round, each athlete had three jumps; the top six received an additional three jumps, with the best of the six to count.

== Records ==
These are the standing world and Olympic records (in metres) prior to the 1956 Summer Olympics.

World record	Józef Szmidt (POL)	17.03	Olsztyn, Poland	5 August 1960
Olympic record	Adhemar da Silva (BRA)	16.35	Melbourne, Australia	27 November 1956

Józef Szmidt broke the Olympic record in the qualifying round with a jump of 16.44 metres; he improved on that further in the first jump of the final round (16.78 metres) and the third jump of the final round (16.81 metres).

== Schedule ==
All times are Central European Time (UTC+1)

Date	Time	Round
Tuesday, 6 September 1960	9:00; 15:00	Qualifying; Final

== Results ==
All jumpers reaching 15.50 metres advanced to the finals. All distances are listed in metres.

=== Qualifying ===
Rank	Athlete	Nation	1	2	3	Distance	Notes
1	Józef Szmidt	Poland	16.44 OR	—	—	16.44	Q, OR
2	Vladimir Goryaev	Soviet Union	15.14	16.21	—	16.21	Q
3	Ryszard Malcherczyk	Poland	15.46	15.93	—	15.93	Q
4	Ian Tomlinson	Australia	15.29	15.89	—	15.89	Q
5	Manfred Hinze	United Team of Germany	15.86	—	—	15.86	Q
6	Kari Rahkamo	Finland	15.85	—	—	15.85	Q
7	Sten Erickson	Sweden	X	15.47	15.76	15.76	Q
8	Vilhjálmur Einarsson	Iceland	15.49	15.74	—	15.74	Q
9	Yevgeny Mikhaylov	Soviet Union	15.68	—	—	15.68	Q
10	Pier Luigi Gatti	Italy	15.12	X	15.66	15.66	Q
11	Fred Alsop	Great Britain	X	15.65	—	15.65	Q
12	Ira Davis	United States	15.64	—	—	15.64	Q
13	Adhemar da Silva	Brazil	15.47	15.61	—	15.61	Q
14	John Baguley	Australia	14.62	14.74	15.56	15.56	Q
15	Vitold Kreyer	Soviet Union	15.56	—	—	15.56	Q
16	Enzo Cavalli	Italy	15.48	15.33	15.37	15.48	
17	Bill Sharpe	United States	15.44	15.24	X	15.44	
18	Tomio Ota	Japan	13.59	15.42	X	15.42	
19	Dodyu Patarinski	Bulgaria	X	15.37	X	15.37	
20	Jörg Wischmeyer	United Team of Germany	X	15.20	15.23	15.23	
21	Eric Battista	France	15.22	X	14.83	15.22	
22	Hannu Rantala	Finland	15.11	14.94	15.08	15.11	
23	Karl Thierfelder	United Team of Germany	X	15.08	X	15.08	
24	Jan Jaskólski	Poland	X	14.84	15.04	15.04	
25	Hiroshi Shibata	Japan	14.93	14.80	X	14.93	
26	Luis Felipe Areta	Spain	X	14.93	—	14.93	
27	Frederico Bisson	Italy	X	14.21	14.76	14.76	
28	Herman Stokes	United States	14.74	14.53	14.48	14.74	
29	Samuel Igun	Nigeria	14.74	14.52	14.26	14.74	
30	Rouhollah Rahmani	Iran	14.70	13.52	14.42	14.70	
31	Koji Sakurai	Japan	14.59	14.17	14.07	14.59	
32	A. Abdul Razzak	Iraq	14.08	14.56	14.27	14.56	
33	Ramón López	Cuba	14.05	14.53	14.52	14.53	
34	Muhammad Khan	Pakistan	X	14.43	14.20	14.43	
35	Konstantinos Sfikas	Greece	14.25	13.60	14.32	14.32	
36	Dave Norris	New Zealand	X	13.78	14.30	14.30	
37	Pedro Camacho	Puerto Rico	X	14.21	13.58	14.21	
38	Yıldıray Pağda	Turkey	14.11	13.85	X	14.11	
39	Pierre William	France	13.29	X	X	13.29	
—	Lyuben Gurgushinov	Bulgaria	DNS				
—	Kaimar-ud-Din bin Maidin	Malaya	DNS				

=== Final ===
Rank	Athlete	Nation	1	2	3	4	5	6	Distance	Notes
1st place, gold medalist(s)	Józef Szmidt	Poland	16.78 OR	X	16.81 OR	X	16.63	13.48	16.81	OR
2nd place, silver medalist(s)	Vladimir Goryaev	Soviet Union	16.11	16.39	15.55	16.63	16.28	X	16.63	
3rd place, bronze medalist(s)	Vitold Kreyer	Soviet Union	16.21	16.00	15.96	16.01	15.91	16.43	16.43	
4	Ira Davis	United States	X	16.41	X	16.13	X	16.05	16.41	
5	Vilhjálmur Einarsson	Iceland	16.37	16.06	15.90	16.24	X	16.36	16.37	
6	Ryszard Malcherczyk	Poland	15.87	16.01	15.83	15.82	13.18	14.66	16.01	
7	Manfred Hinze	United Team of Germany	15.93	X	15.84	Did not advance			15.93	
8	Kari Rahkamo	Finland	15.84	X	15.71	Did not advance			15.84	
9	Ian Tomlinson	Australia	15.40	15.71	13.29	Did not advance			15.71	
10	Yevgeny Mikhaylov	Soviet Union	15.50	15.67	14.83	Did not advance			15.67	
11	Sten Erickson	Sweden	15.49	15.32	X	Did not advance			15.49	
12	Fred Alsop	Great Britain	15.49	X	X	Did not advance			15.49	
13	John Baguley	Australia	14.88	15.16	15.22	Did not advance			15.22	
14	Adhemar da Silva	Brazil	X	14.87	15.07	Did not advance			15.07	
—	Pier Luigi Gatti	Italy	X	X	X	Did not advance			No mark	
