= 1962 European Athletics Championships – Men's triple jump =

Men's triple jump at the European Athletics Championships

The men's triple jump at the 1962 European Athletics Championships was held in Belgrade, then Yugoslavia, at JNA Stadium on 13 September 1962.

== Medalists ==
Gold	Józef Szmidt; Poland
Silver	Vladimir Goryayev; Soviet Union
Bronze	Oleg Fedoseyev; Soviet Union

== Results ==
=== Final ===
13 September

Rank	Name	Nationality	Result	Notes
1st place, gold medalist(s)	Józef Szmidt	Poland	16.55	CR
2nd place, silver medalist(s)	Vladimir Goryayev	Soviet Union	16.39	
3rd place, bronze medalist(s)	Oleg Fedoseyev	Soviet Union	16.24	
4	Jan Jaskólski	Poland	16.02	
5	Radoslav Jocić	Yugoslavia	15.68	NR
6	Vilhjálmur Einarsson	Iceland	15.62	
7	Odd Bergh	Norway	15.52	
8	Lyuben Gurgushinov	Bulgaria	15.22	
9	Hans-Jürgen Rückborn	East Germany	15.11	
10	Enzo Cavalli	Italy	15.09	
11	Kari Rahkamo	Finland	15.09	
12	Manfred Hinze	East Germany	13.67	

=== Qualification ===
13 September

Rank	Name	Nationality	Result	Notes
1	Józef Szmidt	Poland	15.98	Q
2	Jan Jaskólski	Poland	15.86	Q
3	Manfred Hinze	East Germany	15.79	Q
4	Vilhjálmur Einarsson	Iceland	15.76	Q
5	Oleg Fedoseyev	Soviet Union	15.68	Q
6	Radoslav Jocić	Yugoslavia	15.58	Q
7	Vladimir Goryayev	Soviet Union	15.54	Q
8	Kari Rahkamo	Finland	15.53	Q
9	Lyuben Gurgushinov	Bulgaria	15.50	Q
10	Enzo Cavalli	Italy	15.48	Q
11	Hans-Jürgen Rückborn	East Germany	15.44	Q
12	Odd Bergh	Norway	15.40	Q
13	Vitold Kreyer	Soviet Union	15.39	
14	Fred Alsop	Great Britain	15.33	
15	Mike Ralph	Great Britain	15.31	
16	Éric Battista	France	15.22	
17	Yrjö Tamminen	Finland	15.20	
18	Dodyu Patarinski	Bulgaria	15.18	
19	Giuseppe Gentile	Italy	15.16	
20	Șerban Ciochină	Romania	15.07	
21	Sorin Ioan	Romania	15.06	
22	Luis Felipe Areta	Spain	15.06	
23	Karl Thierfelder	East Germany	14.94	

== Participation ==
According to an unofficial count, 23 athletes from 13 countries participated in the event.

- Bulgaria (2)
- East Germany (3)
- Finland (2)
- France (1)
- Iceland (1)
- Italy (2)
- Norway (1)
- Poland (2)
- Romania (2)
- Soviet Union (3)
- Spain (1)
- Great Britain (2)
- Yugoslavia (1)
