= Athletics at the 1956 Summer Olympics – Men's triple jump =

Lawrence ogwang

Men's triple jump at the Games of the XVI Olympiad
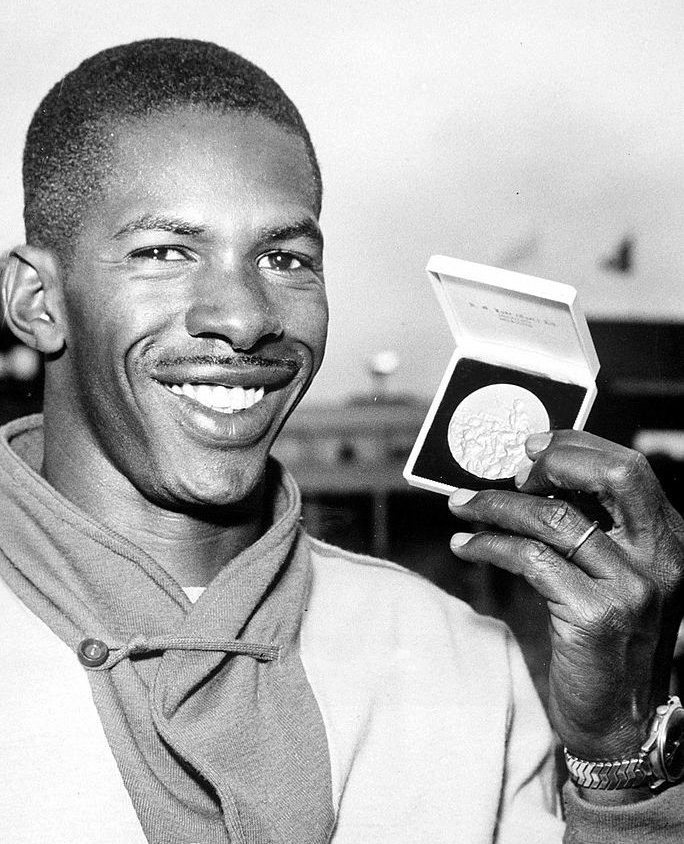
- Adhemar da Silva
- Venue: Olympic Park Stadium
- Date: 27 November 1956
- Competitors: 32 from 20 nations
- Winning distance: 16.35 OR

Medalists
1st place, gold medalist(s)		Adhemar da Silva; Brazil
2nd place, silver medalist(s)		Vilhjálmur Einarsson; Iceland
3rd place, bronze medalist(s)		Vitold Kreyer; Soviet Union

Video on YouTube Official Video @25:54

The men's triple jump was an event at the 1956 Summer Olympics in Melbourne, Australia. The event was also known at the time as the hop, step and jump. Thirty-two athletes from 20 nations competed. The maximum number of athletes per nation had been set at 3 since the 1930 Olympic Congress. The event was won by Adhemar da Silva of Brazil, successfully defending his 1952 title. He was the second man to do so, after Myer Prinstein in 1900 and 1904. Vilhjálmur Einarsson won Iceland's first Olympic medal in any event with the silver in this competition. Vitold Kreyer put the Soviet Union on the men's triple jump podium for the second Games in a row with his bronze.

== Summary ==
The qualification round mark was set at 14.80 metres. Eleven athletes didn't surpass that distance in the morning session.

During the afternoon final, Bill Sharpe took the early lead with an American record 15.88m. In the second round, the surprise of the Olympics Vilhjálmur Einarsson jumped a wind aided 16.26m to take the lead. Defending champion and world record holder Adhemar da Silva jumped 16.04m. In the third round, Vitold Kreyer moved into bronze medal position with a 16.02m, while Sharpe injured himself on his attempt and was unable to continue the battle. In the fourth round, da Silva popped an Olympic record 16.35 m (53 ft 7 1/2 in) to take the lead. da Silva backed up his jump by equalling Einarsson's best jump in the fifth round and adding a 16.21m in the final round. da Silva became Brazil's first back to back winner, while Einarsson won Iceland's first medal.

== Background ==
This was the 13th appearance of the event, which is one of 12 athletics events to have been held at every Summer Olympics. Returning finalists from the 1952 Games were gold medalist Adhemar da Silva of Brazil and silver medalist Leonid Shcherbakov of the Soviet Union. Bronze medalist Asnoldo Devonish of Venezuela was entered but did not compete. In 1953, Shcherbakov had broken da Silva's world record, set at the 1952 Olympics; in 1955, da Silva took the world record back.

Nigeria, North Borneo, Pakistan, Singapore, and Uganda each made their first appearance in the event. The United States competed for the 13th time, having competed at each of the Games so far.

== Competition format ==
The competition used the two-round format introduced in 1936. In the qualifying round, each jumper received three attempts to reach the qualifying distance of 14.80 metres; if fewer than 12 men did so, the top 12 (including all those tied) would advance. In the final round, each athlete had three jumps; the top six received an additional three jumps, with the best of the six to count.

== Records ==
These are the standing world and Olympic records (in metres) prior to the 1956 Summer Olympics.

World record	Adhemar da Silva (BRA)	16.56	Mexico City, Mexico	16 March 1955
Olympic record	Adhemar da Silva (BRA)	16.22	Helsinki, Finland	23 July 1952

Vilhjálmur Einarsson jumped what would have been an Olympic record of 16.26 metres in the competition, but this was (a) wind-assisted and (b) improved upon by Adhemar da Silva, who won with a record mark of 16.35 metres.

== Schedule ==
All times are Australian Eastern Standard Time (UTC+10)

Date	Time	Round
Tuesday, 27 November 1956	10:00; 14:30	Qualifying; Final

== Results ==
=== Qualifying ===
Rank	Athlete	Nation	1	2	3	Distance	Notes
1	Teruji Kogake	Japan	15.63	—	—	15.63	Q
2	Leonid Shcherbakov	Soviet Union	15.59	—	—	15.59	Q
3	Koji Sakurai	Japan	15.49	—	—	15.49	Q
4	Kari Rahkamo	Finland	15.43	—	—	15.43	Q
5	Vitold Kreyer	Soviet Union	15.38	—	—	15.38	Q
6	Hiroshi Shibata	Japan	15.27	—	—	15.27	Q
7	George Shaw	United States	14.79	15.23	—	15.23	Q
8	Tapio Lehto	Finland	14.67	13.34	15.21	15.21	Q
9	Vilhjálmur Einarsson	Iceland	15.16	—	—	15.16	Q
9	Bill Sharpe	United States	15.16	—	—	15.16	Q
11	Adhemar da Silva	Brazil	15.15	—	—	15.15	Q
12	Éric Battista	France	14.99	—	—	14.99	Q
13	Martin Řehák	Czechoslovakia	14.97	—	—	14.97	Q
14	Lawrence Ogwang	Uganda	14.76	14.31	14.95	14.95	Q
15	Mohinder Singh	India	14.66	14.93	—	14.93	Q
16	Ira Davis	United States	14.93	—	—	14.93	Q
16	Peter Esiri	Nigeria	14.93	—	—	14.93	Q
18	Hannu Rantala	Finland	14.45	14.92	—	14.92	Q
19	Ken Wilmshurst	Great Britain	14.89	—	—	14.89	Q
20	Choi Yong-Kee	South Korea	14.86	—	—	14.86	Q
21	Ryszard Malcherczyk	Poland	14.84	—	—	14.84	Q
22	Paul Bamela Engo	Nigeria	14.81	—	—	14.81	Q
23	Brian Oliver	Australia	14.37	14.08	14.74	14.74	
24	Gabuh Piging	North Borneo	14.47	14.55	X	14.55	
25	Ronald Gray	Australia	14.37	14.46	14.31	14.46	
26	Wu Chun-tsai	Republic of China	X	14.36	X	14.36	
27	Maurice Rich	Australia	14.26	13.76	13.91	14.26	
28	Sium Diau	North Borneo	14.09	13.99	13.56	14.09	
29	Walter Herssens	Belgium	14.05	13.99	—	14.05	
30	Muhammad Rashid	Pakistan	X	X	13.90	13.90	
31	Muhammad Ramzan Ali	Pakistan	13.00	13.53	13.35	13.53	
—	Eng-Yoon Tian	Singapore	X	X	X	No mark	
—	Yevgeny Chen	Soviet Union	DNS				
—	Asnoldo Devonish	Venezuela	DNS				
—	A. Abdul Razzak	Iraq	DNS				

=== Final ===
Rank	Athlete	Nation	1	2	3	4	5	6	Distance	Notes
1st place, gold medalist(s)	Adhemar da Silva	Brazil	15.69	16.04	15.90	16.35 OR	16.26	16.21	16.35	OR
2nd place, silver medalist(s)	Vilhjálmur Einarsson	Iceland	X	16.26	15.81	X	15.61	—	16.26	
3rd place, bronze medalist(s)	Vitold Kreyer	Soviet Union	15.83	X	16.02	15.51	X	X	16.02	
4	Bill Sharpe	United States	15.88	X	14.15	—	—	—	15.88	
5	Martin Řehák	Czechoslovakia	15.58	X	15.85	X	15.10	15.63	15.85	
6	Leonid Shcherbakov	Soviet Union	15.75	X	15.58	X	15.80	15.12	15.80	
7	Koji Sakurai	Japan	15.73	15.59	15.29	Did not advance			15.73	
8	Teruji Kogake	Japan	15.64	14.71	15.01	Did not advance			15.64	
9	Ken Wilmshurst	Great Britain	15.42	15.54	15.09	Did not advance			15.54	
10	Ryszard Malcherczyk	Poland	15.54	15.26	15.41	Did not advance			15.54	
11	Ira Davis	United States	14.16	X	15.40	Did not advance			15.40	
12	George Shaw	United States	15.33	X	X	Did not advance			15.33	
13	Hiroshi Shibata	Japan	15.25	14.85	X	Did not advance			15.25	
14	Kari Rahkamo	Finland	15.21	X	X	Did not advance			15.21	
15	Mohinder Singh	India	15.20	X	X	Did not advance			15.20	
16	Éric Battista	France	15.15	15.03	X	Did not advance			15.15	
17	Paul Bamela Engo	Nigeria	14.98	15.03	14.87	Did not advance			15.03	
18	Tapio Lehto	Finland	14.63	14.91	X	Did not advance			14.91	
19	Hannu Rantala	Finland	14.65	14.87	14.87	Did not advance			14.87	
20	Lawrence Ogwang	Uganda	14.19	14.72	14.15	Did not advance			14.72	
21	Choi Yong-Kee	South Korea	14.65	X	X	Did not advance			14.65	
—	Peter Esiri	Nigeria	X	X	X	Did not advance			No mark	
