= 1984 Pan American Junior Athletics Championships =

III Pan American Junior Athletics Championships
- Dates: August 23–25
- Host city: Nassau, Bahamas (The Bahamas)
- Level: Junior
- Events: 38
- Participation: about 219 athletes from 14 nations

The 3rd Pan American Junior Athletics Championships were held in Nassau, Bahamas, on August 23–25, 1984.

== Participation (unofficial) ==
Detailed result lists can be found on the "World Junior Athletics History" website. An unofficial count yields the number of about 219 athletes from about 14 countries: Argentina (3), Bahamas (33), Bermuda (2), Brazil (14), Canada (59), Colombia (2), Ecuador (3), Jamaica (14), Martinique (2), Mexico (11), Panama (5), Puerto Rico (2), United States (68), Venezuela (1).

== Medal summary ==
Medal winners are published. Complete results can be found on the "World Junior Athletics History" website.

=== Men ===
Event	Gold		Silver		Bronze	
100 metres	Joe DeLoach (USA)	10.43w	Jason Leach (USA)	10.44w	William Trott (BER)	10.52w
200 metres	Joe DeLoach (USA)	20.94w	Courtney Brown (CAN)	21.07w	Anthony Mahone (USA)	21.34w
400 metres	Dennis Mitchell (USA)	46.83	Andrew Valmon (USA)	46.94	Bernard Whyte (CAN)	47.20
800 metres	Joey Bunch (USA)	1:48.55	Luis Migueles (ARG)	1:48.67	Kevin Wiseman (CAN)	1:51.77
1500 metres	Charles Marsala (USA)	3:49.81	Luis Migueles (ARG)	3:50.93	John Castellano (CAN)	3:53.52
5000 metres	John Castellano (CAN)	14:16.18	Roberto López (MEX)	14:16.21	Bob Rice (CAN)	14:23.16
2000 metres steeplechase	Roberto López (MEX)	5:52.2	Karl Van Calcar (USA)	5:52.6	Bob Rice (CAN)	6:02.9
110 metres hurdles	Arthur Blake (USA)	14.02w	Mark Boyd (USA)	14.13w	Lyndon Campos (BRA)	14.50w
400 metres hurdles	Kevin Henderson (USA)	51.05	Belfred Clark (USA)	51.55	Neville Douglas (CAN)	52.17
4 × 100 metres relay	United States; Greg Sholars; Kevin Robinzine; Jason Leach; Joe DeLoach	40.09	Canada; D'Arcy Kay; David Wilkinson; Courtney Brown; Bernard Whyte	40.77	Bahamas; Joey Wells; Byron Ferguson; Mark Johnson; Oscar Skippings	41.91
4 × 400 metres relay	United States; Mike Spangler; Dennis Mitchell; Kevin Robinzine; Andrew Valmon	3:07.59	Canada; Bernard Whyte; Neville Douglas; John Graham; Ron Richards	3:08.32	Bahamas; Oscar Skippings; Byron Ferguson; Sean Burrows; Steven Smith	3:17.18
10,000 metres track walk	Carlos Mercenario (MEX)	48:51.7	Tony Engelhardt (USA)	50:48.8	Dave McGovern (USA)	51:54.5
High jump	Dothel Edwards (USA)	2.21	Mark Reed (USA)	2.15	Troy Kemp (BAH); Fernando Pastoriza (ARG)	2.10
Pole vault	Doug Fraley (USA)	5.28	Brandon Richards (USA)	5.07	Bob Lindsay (CAN)	4.87
Long jump	Joey Wells (BAH)	7.89	Marcus Barros (BRA)	7.58	Joseph Richardson (USA)	7.38
Triple jump	John Tillman (USA)	16.61	Kenny Harrison (USA)	16.05	Wendell Lawrence (BAH)	15.26
Shot put	José de Souza (BRA)	17.09	Gary LeJambre (USA)	16.95	Rob Venier (CAN)	16.88
Discus throw	José de Souza (BRA)	47.64	Jess Grigg (USA)	47.22	Peter Massfeller (CAN)	45.16
Hammer throw	John Thomas (USA)	51.22	Eldon Pfeiffer (CAN)	50.48	Alan Lareau (USA)	50.24
Javelin throw	Robert Amabile (USA)	73.14	Mike Olma (CAN)	68.20	Bruce Bacchiocchi (USA)	66.80
Decathlon	Steve Klassen (USA)	7323	Pedro da Silva (BRA)	7048	Ron McPhee (BAH)	6710

=== Women ===
Event	Gold		Silver		Bronze	
100 metres	Katie Anderson (CAN)	11.60w	Denise Liles (USA)	11.62w	Gail Devers (USA)	11.68w
200 metres	Denise Liles (USA)	23.90w	Pamela Qualls (USA)	23.94w	Rosey Edeh (CAN)	23.98w
400 metres	Andrea Thomas (JAM)	52.57	Chewaukii Knighten (USA)	53.03	Tanya McIntosh (USA)	53.13
800 metres	Elsie Braithwaite (CAN)	2:07.1	Kerri Zaleski (USA)	2:07.5	Andrea Thomas (JAM)	2:09.2
1500 metres	Suzy Favor (USA)	4:19.46	Robyn Meagher (CAN)	4:21.8	Brenda Shackleton (CAN)	4:23.63
3000 metres	Brenda Shackleton (CAN)	9:26.7	Kristen Perini (USA)	9:29.4	Genoveva Domínguez (MEX)	9:30.9
100 metres hurdles	LaVonna Martin (USA)	13.55	Yolande Jones (CAN)	13.98	Nancy McCuaig (CAN)	14.21
400 metres hurdles	Leslie Maxie (USA)	58.38	Donalda Duprey (CAN)	58.99	Carmelle Hunka (CAN)	60.00
4 × 100 metres relay	United States; Andrea Bush; Pam Qualls; Gail Devers; Denise Liles	45.13	Bahamas; Tanya Woodside; Joan Major; Cheryl Munroe; Sheena Sturrup	47.19	Brazil; Aline Figueirêdo; Orlane dos Santos; Mônica Rocha; Jucilene Garcês	49.50
4 × 400 metres relay	United States; Julie Johnson; Tanya McIntosh; Chewuakii Knighten; Leslie Maxie	3:36.69	Canada; Gail Harris; Lisa Kroll; C. Samuels; Rosey Edeh	3:38.68	Bahamas; Sheena Sturrup; Joan Major; Mariska Stubbs; Dornel Butler	3:55.35
3000 metres Track Walk	Sybil Perez (USA)	15:05.4	María Colín (MEX)	15:06.1	Céline Giguère (CAN)	15:46.1
High jump	Lisa Bernhagen (USA)	1.89	Latrese Johnson (USA)	1.86	Orlane dos Santos (BRA)	1.86
Long jump	Wendy Brown (USA)	6.10	Claire Connor (USA)	5.95	Christina Ignacz (CAN)	5.90
Shot put	Laverne Eve (BAH)	14.93	Carla Garrett (USA)	14.56	Jill Palmer (USA)	14.30
Discus throw	Carla Garrett (USA)	48.78	Colleen Rosensteel (USA)	47.70	María Isabel Urrutia (COL)	42.98
Javelin throw	Michelle Olivera (USA)	54.12	Laverne Eve (BAH)	53.50	Cheryl Coker (CAN)	48.54
Heptathlon	Orlane dos Santos (BRA)	5344	France Nault (CAN)	5077	Pamela Doggett (USA)	4967

== Medal table (unofficial) ==
* Host nation (Bahamas)

Rank	Nation	Gold	Silver	Bronze	Total
1	United States	26	20	9	55
2	Canada	4	10	16	30
3	Brazil	3	2	3	8
4	Bahamas*	2	2	6	10
5	Mexico	2	2	1	5
6	Jamaica	1	0	1	2
7	Argentina	0	2	1	3
8	Bermuda	0	0	1	1
8	Colombia	0	0	1	1
Totals (9 entries)		38	38	39	115
