= Sium Diau =

Malaysian triple jumper (born 1935)

Datuk Sium Diau PGDK
Personal information
- Full name: Sium bin Diau
- Nationality: Malaysian
- Born: 13 October 1935 (age 90) Kota Belud, North Borneo

Sport
- Sport: Athletics
- Event: Triple jump

Datuk Sium bin Diau (born 13 October 1935) is a Malaysian triple jumper. Sium was active in sport while he was young and focused in association football but would then practice mostly in the triple jump. Outside of sport, he would work as a primary school teacher. He and Gabuh Piging would represent North Borneo at the 1956 Summer Olympics for the protectorate's first and only appearance at a Summer Games.

Sium would compete in the qualifying round of the triple jump and would place 28th, not advancing the finals. He would retire after the Summer Games and continued working as a primary school teacher until his optional retirement in 1993. In 2008, he would be awarded the title of Datuk due to his service in sport.

== Biography ==
Sium bin Diau was born on 13 October 1935 in Kota Belud in what was then North Borneo. Sium practiced sport while he was young and focused in association football. He would then practice athletics, mostly competing in the triple jump. Outside of sport, he worked as a primary school teacher.

The Sabah Olympic Committee would be recognized by the International Olympic Committee in 1956. For North Borneo's first and only appearance, they would send Sium and Gabuh Piging to compete in men's athletics at the 1956 Summer Olympics in Melbourne, Australia. This would be the first and only major international competition for Sium.

Sium would compete in the qualifying round of the men's triple jump on 27 November against 32 other competitors. There, he would record distances of 14.09 metres, 13.99 metres, 13.56 metres, and 14.09 metres for his last. With his highest distance of 14.09 metres on two attempts, he would place 28th overall and would not advance to the finals of the event.

After the 1956 Summer Games, he would retire from sport and continued his work as a primary school teacher of which he later retired in 1993 upon turning 58 years old. 15 years later in 2008, when he was 73 years old, he was given the title of Datuk for his service in sport in conjunction with Tun Ahmadshah Abdullah's 62nd official birthday celebrations that year.

== Honours ==
- Sabah :
  - Commander of the Order of Kinabalu (PGDK) – Datuk (2008)
