= Masters M35 triple jump world record progression =

This is the progression of world record improvements of the triple jump M35 division of Masters athletics.

Key

Incomplete information Pending

| Distance | Wind | Athlete | Nationality | Birthdate | Location | Date |
|---|---|---|---|---|---|---|
| 17.92 | 0.7 | Jonathan Edwards | United Kingdom | 10.05.1966 | Edmonton | 05.08.2001 |
| 16.95 | 1.2 | Ray Kimble | United States | 19.04.1953 | Budapest | 12.08.1988 |
| 16.65 | 0.9 | Jozef Schmidt | Poland | 28.03.1935 | Stockholm | 30.08.1970 |
| 16.20 | | Mohinder Singh | India | 15.03.1934 | San Jose | 02.05.1970 |
| 15.79 | | Dodyu Patarinski | Bulgaria | 16.08.1933 | Athens | 29.06.1969 |
