= Kaare Strøm (athlete) =

Norwegian athletics competitor (1915–1982)

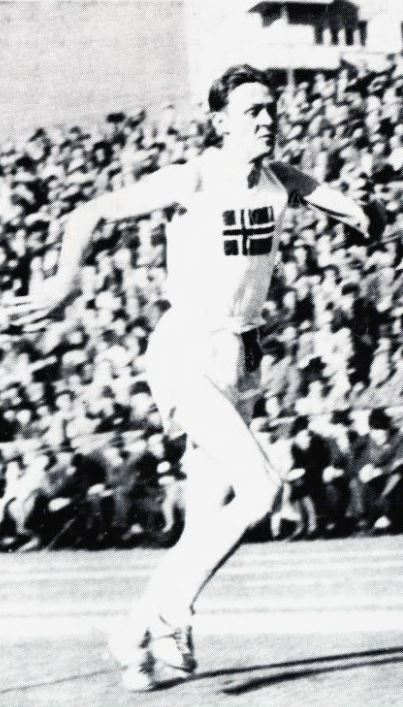
Kaare representing Norway

Kaare Strøm (18 April 1915 – 29 June 1982) was a Norwegian long jumper and triple jumper.

His personal best triple jump was 15.49 metres, achieved in August 1939 at Bislett stadion. With this he was a European record holder for a period, beating the old mark by Vilho Tuulos by one centimetre. Strøm also had a 15.82 metres jump in September 1939 in Gothenburg, albeit with an illegal wind assistance of about 8 m/s. For comparison, 15.49 metres is better than the gold medal-winning results at the 1934, 1938, 1946 and 1950 European Athletics Championships, and also better than the winning result at the 1948 Summer Olympics. His result was a Norwegian record until Odd Bergh jumped 15.63 metres in 1962. Strøm won silver medals at the Norwegian championships in 1935 and 1936, both times behind Eugen Haugland, and became Norwegian champion in 1938 and 1939. Then, no Norwegian championships were staged until 1946 because of World War II. He won the bronze medal in 1947 and a silver medal in 1949 behind Rune Nilsen.

His personal best long jump was 7.465 metres, achieved in September 1937 at Bislett stadion. Representing the club IK Grane, he took the silver medal at the Norwegian championships in 1938, behind Nils Uhlin Hansen, and in 1939 he won the gold medal ahead of Nils Uhlin Hansen and Eugen Haugland. Then, no Norwegian championships were staged until 1946.

Strøm was a pharmacist by profession.
