= North Borneo at the 1956 Summer Olympics =

- Flag of North Borneo
- IOC code: NBO
- NOC: North Borneo Olympic Committee

in Melbourne/Stockholm
- Competitors: 2 in 1 sport
- Flag bearer: Chacha G. S. Kler.
- Medals: Gold 0 Silver 0 Bronze 0 Total 0

Summer Olympics appearances (overview)
- 1956

Other related appearances
- Malaysia (1968–pres.)

North Borneo was represented at the 1956 Summer Olympics in Melbourne, Victoria, Australia by the North Borneo Olympic Committee. It was the only time that the Crown colony would compete at the Olympics before it became part of Malaysia.

In total, two athletes – both men – represented North Borneo in one sport: athletics.

== Background ==
Shortly after World War II, North Borneo became a Crown Colony of the United Kingdom. The North Borneo Olympic Committee was recognised by the International Olympic Committee (IOC) on 24 January 1956 allowing the North Borneo to compete in the 1956 Summer Olympics in Melbourne, Victoria, Australia.

== Competitors ==
In total, two athletes represented North Borneo at the 1956 Summer Olympics in Melbourne, Victoria, Australia across one sport.

Sport	Men	Women	Total
Athletics	2	0	2
Total	2	0	2

== Athletics ==
In total, two North Bornean athletes participated in the athletics events – Gabuh Piging and Sium Diau in the men's triple jump. Piging was also entered in the men's long jump but did not start.

The athletics events took place at the Melbourne Cricket Ground in Yarra Park, Melbourne from 23 November to 1 December 1956.

The qualifying round for the men's triple jump took place on 27 November 1956. Piging's best attempt of 14.55 m came on his second jump and saw him ranked 24th overall. Diau's best attempt of 14.9 m came on his third and final jump and saw him ranked 28th overall. Neither advanced to the final round.

Athlete	Event	Qualifying		Final	
Athlete	Event	Result	Rank	Result	Rank
Gabuh Piging	Men's triple jump	14.55 m	24	Did not advance	
Sium Diau	Men's triple jump	14.09 m	28	Did not advance	

== Aftermath ==
North Borneo did not take part in the 1960 Summer Olympics in Rome, Italy. In 1963, the Crown colonies of North Borneo, Sarawak and Singapore merged with Malaya to form Malaysia.
