= Leslie Maxie =

Personal information
- Born: January 4, 1967 (age 59) San Francisco, California, U.S.
- Height: 5 ft 10 in (178 cm)
- Weight: 130 lb (59 kg)

Sport
- Country: United States
- Sport: Track and Field
- Event(s): hurdles, jumps
- Club: Millbrae Lions
Medal record
Women's Track and Field
Representing United States
Pan American Junior Athletics Championships
Gold medal – first place	1984 Nassau	400 hurdles

Leslie Maxie (born January 4, 1967, in San Francisco, California) is a retired American track and field athlete and subsequently a television broadcast journalist.

While attending Mills High School, she set the still standing World Youth Best of 55.20 seconds in the 400 metre hurdles on June 9, 1984, while finishing second at the 1984 TAC USA Outdoor Track and Field Championships, held at nearby San Jose City College.

Maxie competed in the 1988 Summer Olympics, running 56.10 seconds to finish a non-qualifying 5th place in the heat of the 400 hurdles. On a lighter note, she did win, "Best Smile" at the Olympic Village.

== Early career ==
Maxie was coached by the legendary Ed Parker. As a member of the Millbrae Lions Track Club, a team which encouraged young athletes to try multiple events, Maxie competed in the High Jump, Triple Jump 400 metres and 100 metre hurdles. As a freshman at the 1982 CIF California State Meet, she was in the top four in three events. To qualify, she won the CCS Section Championships and placed second to Wendy Brown in both jumps. 1983, she won the 400 m, see the race, and placed second in the 100 hurdles. 1984 was her first year to experiment with the long hurdles race. A week before her World record saw her winning the state meet in meet record time. As a senior, she repeated her 300 hurdle championship. See the race A week before the 1984 state meet, in Berkeley, California she set the National High School record in the 300 hurdles at 40.18 That performance is still ranked as the number three mark of all time. She was Track and Field News "High School Athlete of the Year" in 1984.

After high school, she studied Public Policy and Planning at the University of Southern California, where she is still ranked as the #2 400 hurdler of all time (school record holder for 13 years until surpassed by future Olympic bronze medalist Tasha Danvers). She finished second in the 400 hurdles and was on the National Champion 4x400 relay at the 1987 NCAA Women's Outdoor Track and Field Championships, thus achieving All-American status in both the 400 hurdles and the 4x400 relay. She was team captain in 1990.

Over her career, she was ranked in the U.S. top ten in the 400 hurdles four times.

== Broadcast Journalism ==
As a young athlete she was selected to work on the children's programming show Kidwatch on KRON which led to her interest in journalism. She also pursued and won a recurring singing role on Just Kidding on the same station.

Maxie returned to TV in the mid 1990s. She purposefully did not cover track and field until she was established as a general correspondent which allowed her to cover the Super Bowl, World Series, NBA All Star Games, Tour de France, championship boxing and tennis for Fox, CBS, Oxygen Media and NBC. When she did cover track it was in support of Carol Lewis on events she did not cover. Maxie's insightful commentary and intelligent interviewing skills made her look like a shining star. ESPN took notice and Maxie was the first member hired for the morning talk show, "Cold Pizza" in 2003. When talk began of moving the show to Bristol, CT Maxie opted out of her contract and began freelancing for the network and she established her own television production company, LeMax Productions LLC in 2005. LeMax Production's first client was Red Bull energy drink based in Austria. LeMax went on to contract with Madison Square Garden Network, ABC, ESPN amongst others. Maxie has also done work as a motivational speaker.

In 2009, Maxie joined NASCAR as Manager of Communications for East Regional Media Outreach. She has written episodes for the NASCAR BET show called Changing Lanes.
