= Muhammad Khan (athlete) =

Pakistani triple jumper (born 1934)

Personal information
- Nationality: Pakistani
- Born: 14 August 1934 (age 91)

Sport
- Sport: Athletics
- Event: Triple jump

Muhammad Khan (born 14 August 1934) is a Pakistani athlete. He competed in the men's triple jump at the 1960 Summer Olympics.

Although Khan only jumped 14.43 m at the Olympics and did not qualify for the finals, he did improve his best to 15.05 m in 1962. That same year, he entered in the long jump and triple jump at the 1962 Asian Games. He finished in the top 9 in the triple jump there, where his season's best would have been good enough to win the bronze medal.
