= Yevgeny Mikhaylov (athlete) =

Soviet triple jumper

Personal information
- Nationality: Soviet
- Born: 17 January 1937 (age 89)

Sport
- Sport: Athletics
- Event: Triple jump

Yevgeny Mikhaylov (born 17 January 1937) is a Soviet athlete. He competed in the men's triple jump at the 1960 Summer Olympics.
