= Teruji Kogake =

Japanese triple jumper and sports administrator

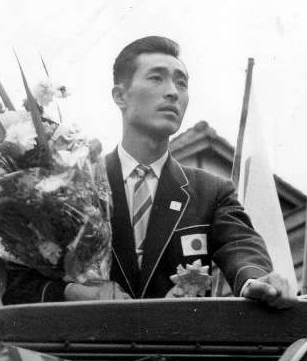
- Teruji Kogake in 1956

Personal information
- Born: December 18, 1932 Joge, Hiroshima, Japan
- Died: May 9, 2010 (aged 77) Tokyo, Japan
- Height: 1.78 m (5 ft 10 in)
- Weight: 68 kg (150 lb)

Sport
- Sport: Triple jump

Teruji Kogake (小掛照二, Kogake Teruji; December 18, 1932 – May 9, 2010) was a Japanese triple jumper and sports administrator. He set a low-altitude world record in the triple jump in 1956 at the Japanese Olympic Trials, and finished eighth at the 1956 Melbourne Olympics while having an ankle injury.

He retired early from the sport and became the track and field coach for the Japanese Association of Athletics Federations (JAAF), leading teams to the Olympics from 1964 to 1992. His selection decisions in the marathon were the subject of national debate in 1988 and 1992. He later became the vice president of both the JAAF and the Japanese Olympic Committee. He was decorated with a third class Order of the Rising Sun in 2005 for his contribution to athletics in Japan.

== Career ==
=== Triple jumper ===
Born in Jōge, Hiroshima, Kogake began to compete in the triple jump while at high school – the track and field event had gained much popularity in Japan through Olympic gold medallists Mikio Oda, Chūhei Nambu, and Naoto Tajima. He graduated from Waseda University in Tokyo and continued to practice the event. At the 1956 Japanese Championships, which served as the Olympic Trials, he jumped what was then considered a world record distance of 16.48 m, adding some 20 cm onto the previous mark (Adhemar da Silva had jumped 16.56 m in March 1955, but this had been achieved in Mexico City and had been aided by the high altitude). Kogake's success came with a penalty in the form of an ankle injury which impeded his performance at the 1956 Melbourne Olympics. He finished in eighth position, with a best jump of 15.64 m, while da Silva won the gold medal with a mark of 16.35 m.

=== Sports administration ===
After retiring from competitive athletics, Kogake took up administration roles within the Japan Association of Athletics Federations (JAAF). He was the track and field coach for the Japanese team at the 1964 Tokyo Olympics, and went on to coach at the 1980 and 1984 Summer Olympics. Kogake became a member of the Japanese Olympic Committee (JOC) in 1983. His decisions for the Olympic marathon came under public criticism when he preferred to pick athletes on past performance rather than performances at selection events – first with Toshihiko Seko for the 1988 Summer Olympics, and then with his choice of Yuko Arimori over Akemi Matsuno for the 1992 Barcelona Olympics.

He became the vice-president of the JAAF in 1995 and held the same position at the JOC from 1999 to 2003. Kogake acted as the head of the delegation at the 1998 and 2002 Asian Games. He was honoured at the Imperial Palace in 2005 by being awarded a third class Order of the Rising Sun (Gold Rays with Neck Ribbon). He was made the Honorary Vice President of the JAAF. Kogake died of liver failure at a Tokyo hospital on May 9, 2010.

== Competition record ==
| Year | Competition | Venue | Position | Notes |
|---|---|---|---|---|
| 1956 | Olympic Games | Melbourne, Australia | 8th | Triple jump |
