= Tapio Lehto =

Finnish triple jumper (1930–2019)

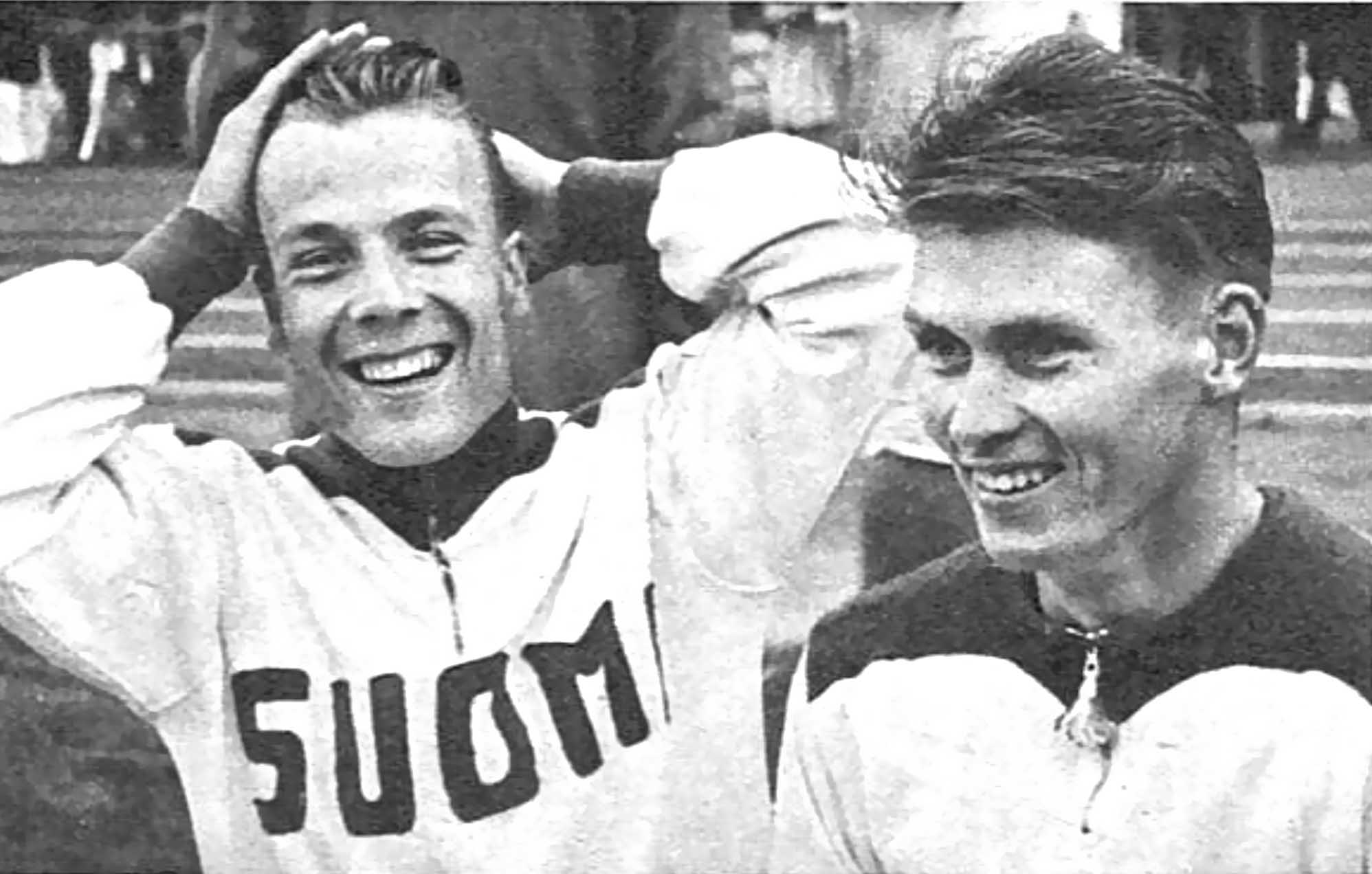
- Finnish triple jumpers at Finland–Hungary games, July 1955 in Helsinki

Personal information
- Nationality: Finnish
- Born: 8 December 1930
- Died: 5 February 2019 (aged 88)

Sport
- Sport: Athletics
- Event: Triple jump

Tapio Lehto (8 December 1930 – 5 February 2019) was a Finnish athlete. He competed in the men's triple jump at the 1956 Summer Olympics.
