= Jan Jaskólski =

Polish triple jumper

Personal information
- Nationality: Polish
- Born: 28 October 1939 Inowrocław, Poland
- Died: 22 June 2013 (aged 73) Inowrocław, Poland
- Height: 1.80 m (5 ft 11 in)
- Weight: 70 kg (154 lb)

Sport
- Sport: Athletics
- Event: Triple jump
- Club: Noteć Mątwy; Zawisza Bydgoszcz

Jan Jaskólski (28 October 1939 – 22 June 2013) was a Polish athlete. He competed in the men's triple jump at the 1960, 1964 and the 1968 Summer Olympics.

== International competitions ==
Year	Competition	Venue	Position	Event	Notes
Representing Poland
1960	Olympic Games	Rome, Italy	24th (q)	Triple jump	15.04 m
1962	European Championships	Belgrade, Yugoslavia	4th	Triple jump	16.02 m
1964	Olympic Games	Tokyo, Japan	12th	Triple jump	15.82 m
1966	European Championships	Budapest, Hungary	4th	Triple jump	16.57 m
1968	Olympic Games	Mexico City, Mexico	14th (q)	Triple jump	16.04 m

== Personal bests ==
- 100 metres – 10.6h (Warsaw 1967)
- Long jump – 7.64 (Bydgoszcz 1962)
- Triple jump – 16.76 (Bydgoszcz 1966)
