= Jörg Wischmeier =

German triple jumper (1935–2012)

Personal information
- Nationality: German
- Born: 16 August 1935 Dortmund, Germany
- Died: 3 October 2012 (aged 77) Korschenbroich, Germany

Sport
- Sport: Athletics
- Event: Triple jump

Jörg Wischmeier (16 August 1935 – 3 October 2012) was a German athlete. He competed in the men's triple jump at the 1960 Summer Olympics.
