= Oleg Fedoseyev =

Soviet athlete specializing in triple jumps

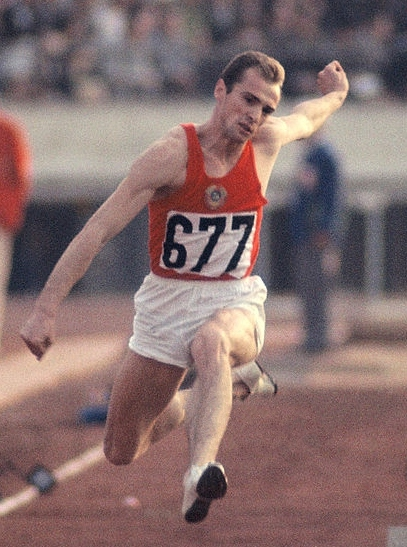
- Oleg Fedoseyev at the 1964 Olympics

Personal information
- Born: 4 June 1936 Moscow, Russian SFSR, Soviet Union
- Died: 14 June 2001 (aged 65)

Sport
- Sport: Triple jump, long jump
- Club: Burevestnik Moscow, Armed Forces sports society

Achievements and titles
- Personal best(s): 16.70 m (1959, TJ); 7.77 m (1959, LJ)
Medal record
Men's athletics
Representing the Soviet Union
Olympic Games
Silver medal – second place	1964 Tokyo	Triple jump
European Championships
Bronze medal – third place	1962 Belgrade	Triple jump

Oleg Georgiyevich Fedoseyev (Russian: Олег Георгиевич Федосеев, 4 June 1936 – 14 June 2001) was a Russian athlete. He was a Soviet champion in the long jump in 1956 and 1958, but finished only eighth at the 1956 Olympics and 1958 European Championships. Fedoseyev then changed to triple jump and in 1959 won a Soviet title and set a world record in this event at 16.70 m. He later won a bronze medal at the 1962 European Championships and a silver at the 1964 Olympics. He also competed in sprint at the national level and in 1962 won a Soviet title in the 4 × 100 m relay.

Records
Preceded by (Soviet Union) Oleg Ryakhovskiy	Men's Triple Jump World Record Holder; 1959-05-03 – 1960-08-05	Succeeded by (Poland) Józef Szmidt
