= Ryszard Malcherczyk =

Polish triple jumper

Personal information
- Nationality: Polish
- Born: 17 October 1934 Zabrze, Poland
- Height: 184 cm (6 ft 0 in)
- Weight: 77 kg (170 lb)

Sport
- Sport: Athletics
- Event: Triple jump
- Club: Legia Warsaw

Ryszard Malcherczyk (born 17 October 1934) is a retired triple jumper from Poland.

He was born in Zabrze and represented the club Legia Warszawa. He finished tenth at the 1956 Olympic Games and sixth at the 1960 Olympic Games.

He became Polish champion in 1961 and 1964. His personal best jump was 16.53 metres, achieved in 1961.

== International competitions ==
Year	Competition	Venue	Position	Event	Notes
Representing Poland
1956	Olympic Games	Melbourne, Australia	10th	Triple jump	15.54 m
1958	European Championships	Stockholm, Sweden	4th	Triple jump	15.83 m
1960	Olympic Games	Rome, Italy	6th	Triple jump	16.01 m

== Personal bests ==
- Long jump – 7.51 (Łódź 1960)
- Triple jump – 16.53 (Szczecin 1961)
