= Wendy Brown (heptathlete) =

American heptathlete and triple jumper

Personal information
- Full name: Wendy Renee Brown
- Nationality: American
- Born: January 28, 1966 (age 60)
- Height: 5 ft 11 in (1.80 m)
- Weight: 154 lb (70 kg)

Sport
- Sport: Track and Field
- Event(s): heptathlon, jumps, hurdles
Medal record
Women's Track and Field
Representing United States
Pan American Junior Athletics Championships
Gold medal – first place	1984 Nassau	Long Jump

Wendy Renee Brown (born January 28, 1966) is a retired heptathlete and triple jumper from the United States. She competed in the heptathlon at the 1988 Summer Olympics in Seoul, South Korea, finishing in 18th place behind teammate Jackie Joyner Kersee's still current world record. As the event was in transition to become an official event, she set the world record in the women's triple jump twice in the mid-1980s. Because this was before the event was declared official, neither of those records were officially ratified. Brown went to the University of Southern California where she won the 1986 NCAA Indoor Championship in the Triple Jump and later winning 1988 NCAA Championship in the Heptathlon. She is still the school record holder in the Triple Jump and Heptathlon, as well as being ranked second in Long Jump and High Jump, and fifth in the Javelin throw.

In 1984, while competing for Woodside High School, Brown won the CIF California State Track team title for her high school singlehandedly, the only athlete to ever accomplish that feat. She scored 38 points winning the Long Jump, Triple Jump and High Jump, and was second in the 100 Hurdles behind future "fastest Woman in the world" Gail Devers. Her 42'10 1/2" jump that year was the NFHS national high school record in the triple jump for seven years. Later in 1984 she won the Pan American Junior Championships in the Long Jump and finishing 4th in the 100 metres hurdles

In 1990, Brown had success as a contestant in the television series American Gladiators, appearing in four episodes and going to the final round of the "second half".

Records
Preceded by Terri Turner; Esmeralda de Jesus Garcia	Women's Triple Jump World Record Holder; Not officially ratified by the IAAF; 1985-05-30 – 1986-06-05; 1987-05-02 – 1987-05-17	Succeeded by Esmeralda de Jesus Garcia; Flora Hyacinth
