= Józef Szmidt =

Polish triple jumper (1935–2024)

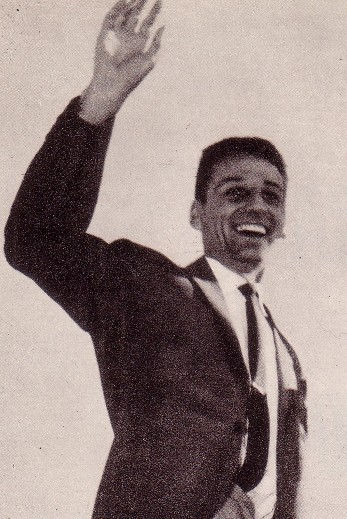

Personal information
- Nationality: Polish
- Born: 28 March 1935 Beuthen, Germany (now Bytom, Poland)
- Died: 29 July 2024 (aged 89) Zagozd, Poland
- Height: 184 cm (6 ft 0 in)
- Weight: 77 kg (170 lb)

Sport
- Sport: Athletics
- Event: triple jump
- Club: Górnik Zabrze
Medal record
Men's athletics
Representing Poland
Olympic Games
Gold medal – first place	1960 Rome	Triple jump
Gold medal – first place	1964 Tokyo	Triple jump
European Championships
Gold medal – first place	1958 Stockholm	Triple jump
Gold medal – first place	1962 Belgrade	Triple jump

Józef Szmidt (born Josef Schmidt; 28 March 1935 – 29 July 2024) was a German and Polish Olympic athlete and the first triple jumper to reach 17 metres.

== Biography ==
Józef Schmidt was born in Beuthen, Germany, and was a mechanic by profession. After World War II, Beuthen was transferred to Poland, Schmidt's family had to learn Polish, and their name was changed to Szmidt.

He was the world's leading triple jumper in the early 1960s, becoming European champion in 1958 and 1962, and Olympic champion and winner of Poland's Sportsman of the Year prize in 1960 and 1964. With a jump of 17.03 m in 1960, Szmidt was the first triple jumper to reach 17 metres.

Szmidt won the British AAA Championships title in the triple jump event at the 1966 AAA Championships.

In 1975 Szmidt settled in West Germany, but returned to Poland in 1992. He was the brother of a sprinter Edward Szmidt, who competed at the 1956 Summer Olympics.

Szmidt died of cancer in Zagozd, on 29 July 2024, at the age of 89. His wife had died the week prior.

== International competitions ==
Year	Competition	Venue	Position	Event	Notes
Representing Poland
1958	European Championships	Stockholm, Sweden	1st	Triple jump	16.43 m
1960	Olympic Games	Rome, Italy	–	4 × 100 m relay	DQ
1960	Olympic Games	Rome, Italy	1st	Triple jump	16.81 m
1962	European Championships	Belgrade, Yugoslavia	1st	Triple jump	16.55 m
1964	Olympic Games	Tokyo, Japan	1st	Triple jump	16.85 m
1965	European Cup Final	Stuttgart, West Germany	3rd	Triple jump	16.40 m
1966	European Championships	Budapest, Hungary	5th	Triple jump	16.45 m
1967	European Cup Final	Kiev, Soviet Union	3rd	Triple jump	16.29 m
1968	Olympic Games	Mexico City, Mexico	7th	Triple jump	16.89 m
1970	European Cup Final	Stockholm, Sweden	3rd	Triple jump	16.65 m
1971	European Championships	Helsinki, Finland	11th	Triple jump	15.62 m

== See also ==
- Triple jump world record progression

Records
Preceded by Oleg Fyodoseyev (URS)	Men's Triple Jump World Record Holder; 5 August 1960 – 16 September 1968	Succeeded by Giuseppe Gentile (ITA)
