= Dan Ahearn =

Irish-American triple jumper

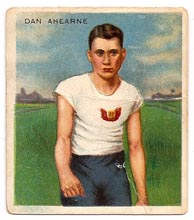
Dan Ahearne, wearing the Winged Fist of the Irish American Athletic Club, from the 1910 Mecca Cigarettes Champion Athlete & Prize Fighter Series trading card.

Dan Ahearn (né Daniel William Ahearne; April 12, 1888 – December 20, 1942) was an Irish and later American track and field athlete and a member of the Irish American Athletic Club. He competed for the U.S. Olympic team in the 1920 Summer Olympics.

He was born in Athea, Ireland and was the younger brother of Tim Ahearne. Ahearn immigrated with his family to the United States in 1909 where the "e" from Ahearne was dropped. He was not naturalized before 1912 because he was not allowed to compete in the 1912 Summer Olympics when he did not hold the U.S. citizenship.

He won the National Amateur Athletic Union junior broad jump championship in 1908. In 1909 Ahearn established several new records for the hop, skip, and jump, but the Amateur Athletic Union threw them out on technicalities. In July 1909, Ahearn succeeded in getting his name on the record books by creating a new record for the two hops and jump, doing the distance of 50 feet 2 inches.

In 1910, at the games of the "First Regiment Irish Volunteers held at Celtic Park, Long Island City...Dan Ahearn, the jumper of the Winged Fist Club, lowered the world's record (in the triple jump) of 50 feet 1/2 inch, held by D. Shanahan, the Irish Jumper."

In 1920 he finished sixth in the Olympic triple jump competition. Ahearn held the world record in the triple jump until 1924. He was later a policeman in Chicago and died there aged 54.

== Notes ==
Records
Preceded by John Breshnihan	Men's Triple Jump World Record Holder; July 31, 1909 – July 12, 1924	Succeeded by Nick Winter
