= Brandon Richards =

American pole vaulter (born 1967)

Personal information
- Full name: Brandon Richards
- Nationality: United States
- Born: February 6, 1967 (age 59)

Sport
- Sport: Track and Field
- Event: Pole Vault
Medal record
Men's Track and Field
Representing United States
Pan American Junior Athletics Championships
Silver medal – second place	1984 Nassau	Pole Vault

Brandon Richards (born February 6, 1967) is an American track and field athlete. He was the national high school record holder in the pole vault and a son of double Olympic Gold Medalist in the pole vault, Bob Richards. He is the third of four of Richards' sons who all excelled at the pole vault—Bob Jr. finished second in 1968 and Tom won the CIF California State Meet in the pole vault.

Richards began vaulting at age five and by age 18, he vaulted 18 ft 2 in (5.54 m), which stood as the highest pole vault for a high schooler for 14 years. The record still stood in 2005 as third-best jump for a high schooler and the best ever by a Californian as of 2012. Richards also set the Indoor record in the pole vault at 17 ft 6 in (5.33 m), which only lasted a year before Pat Manson marginally improved upon it, but it still ranked as the third-best ever in 2007.

Richards' high school record jump was set at an All-comers track meet in Eugene, Oregon, not in high school competition. He chose not to compete for his San Marcos High School team during his senior year. As a junior, Richards was the Texas state champion at Midway High School.

Richards' set his personal record five years later at 18 ft 4.5 in (5.601 m). That mark is the Richards family record, but not in contention with the 19-foot vaulters in the Olympics. He ranked number 260 on the all-time list in 2001. Richards attended the University of California, Los Angeles, where he is ranked as the #10 vaulter in school history.
