= Triple jump world record progression =

The following table shows the world record progression in the men's and women's triple jump, officially ratified by the IAAF.

== Men ==
Ratified
Not ratified
Ratified but later rescinded
Pending ratification

=== Indoor ===
An asterisk indicates a record was repeated.

Men's triple jump indoor world record progression
Mark	Athlete	Date	Venue
12.67 m (41 ft 6 3/4 in)	Tibor Gajzágó (HUN)	8 December 1898	Budapest
13.22 m (43 ft 4 1/4 in)	Bela Mezo (HUN)	8 December 1901	Budapest
13.81 m (45 ft 3 1/2 in)	J.F. O'Connell (USA)	10 November 1906	New York
14.63 m (47 ft 11 3/4 in)	Daniel Ahearn (USA)	5 October 1909	New York
14.70 m (48 ft 2 1/2 in)	Daniel Ahearn (USA)	31 October 1910	New York
15.11 m (49 ft 6 3/4 in)	Daniel Ahearn (USA)	4 February 1911	New York
15.28 m (50 ft 1 1/2 in)	Leonid Shcherbakov (URS)	19 March 1951	Leningrad
15.52 m (50 ft 11 in)	Leonid Shcherbakov (URS)	16 March 1953	Leningrad
15.62 m (51 ft 2 3/4 in)	Dmitriy Yefremov (URS)	4 February 1958	Leningrad
15.66 m (51 ft 4 1/2 in)	Yevgeniy Chen (URS)	8 March 1958	Leningrad
15.80 m (51 ft 10 in)	Oleg Fedoseyev (URS)	3 February 1959	Leningrad
15.83 m (51 ft 11 in)	Oleg Fedoseyev (URS)	22 March 1959	Moscow
15.98 m (52 ft 5 in)	Oleg Fedoseyev (URS)	22 March 1959	Moscow
16.15 m (52 ft 11 3/4 in)	Oleg Fedoseyev (URS)	4 February 1962	Leningrad
16.30 m (53 ft 5 1/2 in)	Oleg Fedoseyev (URS)	23 March 1962	Leningrad
16.37 m (53 ft 8 1/4 in)	Art Walker (USA)	22 January 1966	Los Angeles
16.46 m (54 ft 0 in)	Art Walker (USA)	5 March 1966	Albuquerque
16.70 m (54 ft 9 1/4 in)	Art Walker (USA)	5 March 1966	Albuquerque
16.77 m (55 ft 0 in)	Michael Sauer (FRG)	2 March 1968	Stuttgart
16.86 m (55 ft 3 3/4 in)	Nikolay Dudkin (URS)	27 February 1969	Moscow
16.95 m (55 ft 7 1/4 in)	Viktor Saneyev (URS)	15 March 1970	Wien
16.97 m (55 ft 8 in)	Viktor Saneyev (URS)	11 March 1972	Grenoble
17.03 m (55 ft 10 1/4 in)	Michal Joachimowski (POL)	9 March 1974	Göteborg
17.10 m (56 ft 1 in)	Viktor Saneyev (URS)	2 February 1976	Moscow
17.16 m (56 ft 3 1/2 in)	Viktor Saneyev (URS)	2 February 1976	Moscow
17.18 m (56 ft 4 1/4 in)	Gennadiy Valyukievich (URS)	11 February 1979	Minsk
17.29 m (56 ft 8 1/2 in)	Gennadiy Valyukievich (URS)	12 February 1979	Minsk
17.30 m (56 ft 9 in)	Shamil Abbyasov (URS)	21 February 1981	Grenoble
17.31 m (56 ft 9 1/4 in)	Keith Connor (GBR)	13 March 1981	Detroit
17.41 m (57 ft 1 1/4 in)	Willie Banks (USA)	19 February 1982	San Diego
17.50 m (57 ft 4 3/4 in)	Charles Simpkins (USA)	17 January 1986	Los Angeles
17.54 m (57 ft 6 1/2 in)	Maris Bruzhiks (URS)	23 February 1986	Madrid
17.67 m (57 ft 11 1/2 in)	Oleg Protsenko (URS)	15 January 1987	Osaka
17.76 m (58 ft 3 in)	Mike Conley (USA)	27 February 1987	New York
17.77 m (58 ft 3 1/2 in)	Leonid Voloshin (RUS)	6 February 1994	Grenoble
17.83 m (58 ft 5 3/4 in)	Aliecer Urrutia (CUB)	1 March 1997	Sindelfingen
17.83 m (58 ft 5 3/4 in)*	Christian Olsson (SWE)	7 March 2004	Budapest
17.90 m (58 ft 8 1/2 in)	Teddy Tamgho (FRA)	14 March 2010	Doha
17.91 m (58 ft 9 in)	Teddy Tamgho (FRA)	20 February 2011	Aubière
17.92 m (58 ft 9 1/2 in)	Teddy Tamgho (FRA)	6 March 2011	Paris
17.92 m (58 ft 9 1/2 in)*	Teddy Tamgho (FRA)	6 March 2011	Paris

=== Outdoor ===
The first world record in the men's triple jump was recognized by the International Association of Athletics Federations in 1912. That inaugural record was the 15.52 m performance by Dan Ahearn in 1911.

As of June 21, 2009, 27 world records have been ratified by the IAAF in the event. The men's triple jump world record is unusual in that on five occasions a new record has been set and then broken again on the same day.

Mark	Wind	Athlete	Date	Venue	Duration of record
15.52 m (50 ft 11 in)		Dan Ahearn (USA)	30 May 1911	New York City, U.S.	13 years, 1 month and 12 days
15.52 m (50 ft 11 in)		Nick Winter (AUS)	12 July 1924	Paris, France	7 years, 3 months and 15 days
15.58 m (51 ft 1 1/4 in)		Mikio Oda (JPN)	27 October 1931	Tokyo, Japan	9 months and 18 days
15.72 m (51 ft 6 3/4 in)		Chuhei Nambu (JPN)	4 August 1932	Los Angeles, U.S.	3 years and 4 months
15.78 m (51 ft 9 1/4 in)		Jack Metcalfe (AUS)	14 December 1935	Sydney, Australia	7 months and 23 days
16.00 m (52 ft 5 3/4 in)	0.6	Naoto Tajima (JPN)	6 August 1936	Berlin, Germany	14 years, 3 months and 27 days
16.00 m (52 ft 5 3/4 in)	1.6	Adhemar da Silva (BRA)	3 December 1950	São Paulo, Brazil	9 months and 27 days
16.01 m (52 ft 6 1/4 in)	1.2	Adhemar da Silva (BRA)	30 September 1951	Rio de Janeiro, Brazil	9 months and 23 days
16.12 m (52 ft 10 1/2 in)		Adhemar da Silva (BRA)	23 July 1952	Helsinki, Finland	0 days
16.22 m (53 ft 2 1/2 in)		Adhemar da Silva (BRA)	23 July 1952	Helsinki, Finland	11 months and 26 days
16.23 m (53 ft 2 3/4 in)	1.5	Leonid Shcherbakov (URS)	19 July 1953	Moscow, Soviet Union	1 year, 7 months and 25 days
16.56 m (54 ft 3 3/4 in) A	0.2	Adhemar da Silva (BRA)	16 March 1955	Mexico City, Mexico	3 years, 4 months and 12 days
16.59 m (54 ft 5 in)	1.0	Oleg Ryakhovskiy (URS)	28 July 1958	Moscow, Soviet Union	9 months and 5 days
16.70 m (54 ft 9 1/4 in)	0.0	Oleg Fyodoseyev (URS)	3 May 1959	Nalchik, Soviet Union	1 year, 3 months and 2 days
17.03 m (55 ft 10 1/4 in)	1.0	Józef Szmidt (POL)	5 August 1960	Olsztyn, Poland	8 years, 2 months and 11 days
17.10 m (56 ft 1 in) A	0.0	Giuseppe Gentile (ITA)	16 October 1968	Mexico City, Mexico	1 day
17.22 m (56 ft 5 3/4 in) A	0.0	Giuseppe Gentile (ITA)	17 October 1968	Mexico City, Mexico	0 days
17.23 m (56 ft 6 1/4 in) A	2.0	Viktor Sanyeyev (URS)	17 October 1968	Mexico City, Mexico	0 days
17.27 m (56 ft 7 3/4 in) A	2.0	Nelson Prudêncio (BRA)	17 October 1968	Mexico City, Mexico	0 days
17.39 m (57 ft 1/2 in) A	2.0	Viktor Sanyeyev (URS)	17 October 1968	Mexico City, Mexico	2 years, 9 months and 19 days
17.40 m (57 ft 1 in) A	0.4	Pedro Pérez (CUB)	5 August 1971	Cali, Colombia	1 year, 2 months and 10 days
17.44 m (57 ft 2 1/2 in)	-0.5	Viktor Sanyeyev (URS)	17 October 1972	Sukhumi, Soviet Union	2 years, 11 months and 28 days
17.89 m (58 ft 8 1/4 in) A	0.0	João Carlos de Oliveira (BRA)	15 October 1975	Mexico City, Mexico	9 years, 8 months and 1 day
17.97 m (58 ft 11 1/4 in)	1.5	Willie Banks (USA)	16 June 1985	Indianapolis, U.S.	10 years, 1 month and 2 days
17.98 m (58 ft 11 3/4 in)	1.8	Jonathan Edwards (GBR)	18 July 1995	Salamanca, Spain	20 days
18.16 m (59 ft 6 3/4 in)	1.3	Jonathan Edwards (GBR)	7 August 1995	Gothenburg, Sweden	20 minutes
18.29 m (60 ft 0 in)	1.3	Jonathan Edwards (GBR)	7 August 1995	Gothenburg, Sweden	30 years, 11 months and 18 days

== Women ==
=== Indoor ===
An asterisk indicates a record was repeated.

Women's triple jump indoor world record progression
Mark	Athlete	Date	Venue
12.23 m (40 ft 1 1/4 in)	Tammy Stevenson (USA)	31 December 1983	
12.32 m (40 ft 5 in)	Moya Benzoor (ISR)	11 February 1984	Flagstaff
12.64 m (41 ft 5 1/2 in)	Robyne Johnson (USA)	19 January 1985	Lawrence
12.99 m (42 ft 7 1/4 in)	Esmeralda Garcia (BRA)	26 January 1985	Baton Rouge
13.13 m (43 ft 3/4 in)	Yvette Bates (USA)	8 February 1985	Inglewood
13.14 m (43 ft 1 1/4 in)	Terri Turner (USA)	15 February 1985	Fort Worth
13.19 m (43 ft 3 1/4 in)	Esmeralda Garcia (BRA)	2 March 1985	Gainesville
13.29 m (43 ft 7 in)	Esmeralda Garcia (BRA)	9 March 1985	Syracuse, NY
13.51 m (44 ft 3 3/4 in)	Esmeralda Garcia (BRA)	9 March 1985	Syracuse, NY
13.58 m (44 ft 6 1/2 in)	Galina Chistyakova (URS)	23 February 1986	San Diego
13.86 m (45 ft 5 1/2 in)	Galina Chistyakova (URS)	3 January 1987	Moscow
13.96 m (45 ft 9 1/2 in)	Galina Chistyakova (URS)	3 January 1987	Moscow
13.98 m (45 ft 10 1/4 in)	Galina Chistyakova (URS)	3 January 1987	Moscow
14.16 m (46 ft 5 1/4 in)	Inna Lasovskaya (URS)	15 January 1989	Moscow
14.30 m (46 ft 10 3/4 in)	Inessa Kravets (URS)	9 March 1991	Sevilla
14.39 m (47 ft 2 1/2 in)	Inessa Kravets (URS)	9 March 1991	Sevilla
14.44 m (47 ft 4 1/2 in)	Inessa Kravets (URS)	9 March 1991	Sevilla
14.46 m (47 ft 5 1/4 in)	Yolanda Chen (RUS)	28 February 1993	Moscow
14.47 m (47 ft 5 1/2 in)	Inessa Kravets (UKR)	14 March 1993	Toronto
14.61 m (47 ft 11 in)	Inna Lasovskaya (RUS)	14 January 1994	Moscow
14.78 m (48 ft 5 3/4 in)	Inna Lasovskaya (RUS)	27 January 1994	Moscow
14.90 m (48 ft 10 1/2 in)	Inna Lasovskaya (RUS)	13 February 1994	Liévin
15.03 m (49 ft 3 1/2 in)	Yolanda Chen (RUS)	11 March 1995	Barcelona
15.16 m (49 ft 8 3/4 in)	Ashia Hansen (GBR)	28 February 1998	Valencia
15.16 m (49 ft 8 3/4 in)*	Tatyana Lebedeva (RUS)	6 March 2004	Budapest
15.25 m (50 ft 1/4 in)	Tatyana Lebedeva (RUS)	6 March 2004	Budapest
15.36 m (50 ft 4 1/2 in)	Tatyana Lebedeva (RUS)	6 March 2004	Budapest
15.43 m (50 ft 7 1/4 in)	Yulimar Rojas (VEN)	21 February 2020	Madrid
15.74 m (51 ft 7 1/2 in)	Yulimar Rojas (VEN)	20 March 2022	Beograd

=== Outdoor ===
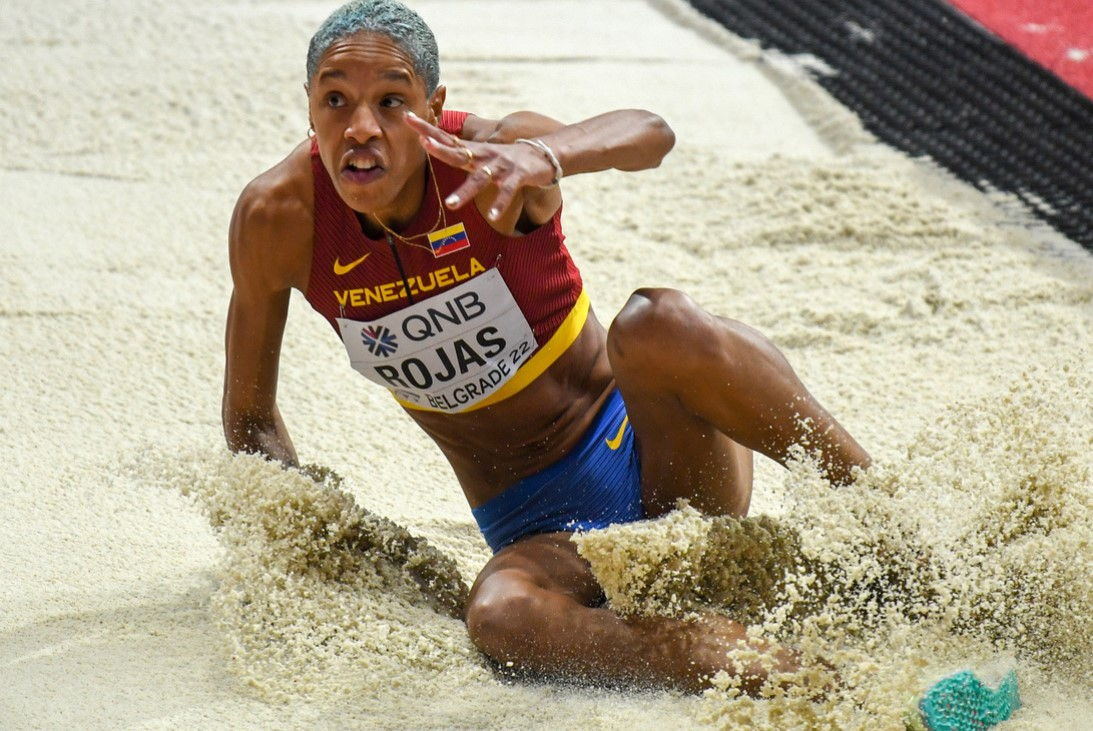
Yulimar Rojas landing the world record triple jump at the 2022 World Athletics Indoor Championships in Belgrade on 20 March 2022

The first world record in the women's triple jump was recognised by the International Association of Athletics Federations in 1990.

As of June 21, 2009, the IAAF has ratified 5 world records in the event.

==== Unofficial pre-IAAF progression to 1990 ====
Mark	Athlete	Date	Venue
10.32 m (33 ft 10 1/4 in)	Elizabeth Stine (USA)	13 May 1922	Mamaroneck, U.S.
10.50 m (34 ft 5 1/4 in)	Adrienne Kaenel (SUI)	23 July 1923	Geneva, Switzerland
11.62 m (38 ft 1 1/4 in)	Kinue Hitomi (JPN)	17 October 1926	Harbin, China
11.66 m (38 ft 3 in)	Rie Yamaguchi (JPN)	21 October 1939	Unknown
12.22 m (40 ft 1 in)	Mary Bignal (GBR)	18 June 1959	Street, United Kingdom
12.43 m (40 ft 9 1/4 in)	Terri Turner (USA)	9 May 1981	Austin, U.S.
12.47 m (40 ft 10 3/4 in)	Terri Turner (USA)	7 May 1982	Austin, U.S.
12.51 m (41 ft 1/2 in)	Melody Smith (USA)	6 May 1983	Austin, U.S.
12.98 m (42 ft 7 in)	Easter Gabriel (USA)	7 May 1983	Baton Rouge, U.S.
13.15 m (43 ft 1 1/2 in)	Terri Turner (USA)	24 March 1984	Austin, U.S.
13.21 m (43 ft 4 in)	Terri Turner (USA)	13 April 1984	Baton Rouge, U.S.
13.58 m (44 ft 6 1/2 in)	Wendy Brown (USA)	30 May 1985	Austin, U.S.
13.68 m (44 ft 10 1/2 in)	Esmeralda Garcia (BRA)	5 June 1986	Indianapolis, U.S.
13.71 m (44 ft 11 3/4 in)	Wendy Brown (USA)	2 May 1987	Los Angeles, U.S.
13.73 m (45 ft 1/2 in)	Flora Hyacinth (ISV)	17 May 1987	Tuscaloosa, U.S.
13.78 m (45 ft 2 1/2 in)	Sheila Hudson (USA)	6 June 1987	Baton Rouge, U.S.
13.85 m (45 ft 5 1/4 in)	Sheila Hudson (USA)	26 June 1987	San Jose, U.S.
14.04 m (46 ft 3/4 in)	Li Huirong (CHN)	11 October 1987	Hamamatsu, Japan
14.16 m (46 ft 5 1/4 in)	Li Huirong (CHN)	23 April 1988	Shijiazhuang, PR China
14.52 m (47 ft 7 1/2 in)	Galina Chistyakova (URS)	2 July 1989	Stockholm, Sweden

==== Official IAAF progression from 1990 ====
Mark	Wind	Athlete	Date	Venue	Duration of record
14.54 m (47 ft 8 1/4 in)	1.1	Li Huirong (CHN)	25 August 1990	Sapporo, Japan	9 months and 16 days
14.95 m (49 ft 1/2 in)	-0.2	Inessa Kravets (URS)	10 June 1991	Moscow, Soviet Union	2 years and 8 days
14.97 m (49 ft 1 1/4 in)	0.9	Iolanda Chen (RUS)	18 June 1993	Moscow, Russia	2 months and 3 days
15.09 m (49 ft 6 in)	0.5	Anna Biryukova (RUS)	21 August 1993	Stuttgart, Germany	1 year, 11 months and 20 days
15.50 m (50 ft 10 in)	0.9	Inessa Kravets (UKR)	10 August 1995	Gothenburg, Sweden	25 years, 11 months and 22 days
15.67 m (51 ft 4 3/4 in)	0.7	Yulimar Rojas (VEN)	1 August 2021	Tokyo, Japan	7 months and 19 days
15.74 m (51 ft 7 1/2 in)	indoor	Yulimar Rojas (VEN)	20 March 2022	Belgrade, Serbia	4 years, 4 months and 5 days

==== Women's triple jump progression controversy ====
Inessa Kravets was found guilty of doping offenses in 1993, after her 1991 record and before setting her long-standing 1995 record. She was later banned for two years in 2000, leading many to doubt the legitimacy of her performance.
