= Rune Nilsen =

Norwegian triple jumper (1923–1998)

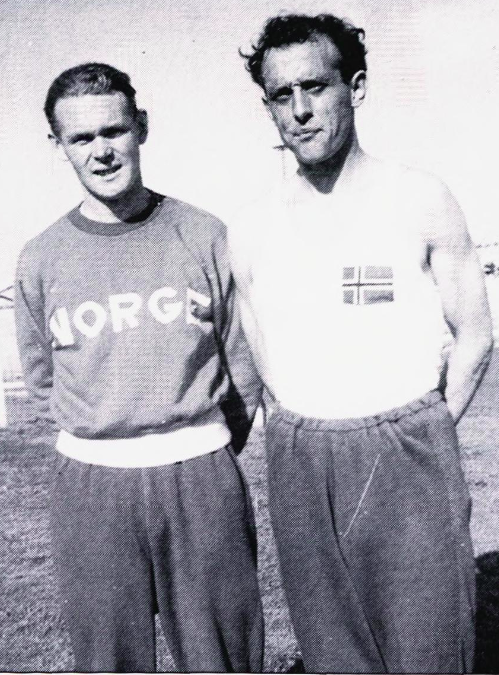
Nilsen (right) and Jakob Rypdal.

Rune Nilsen (15 September 1923 – 19 July 1998) was a Norwegian triple jumper. He represented IF Tønsberg-Kameratene and IL i BUL.

At the 1952 Summer Olympics he finished fifth in the triple jump final with a jump of 15.13 metres. At the 1950 European Championships in Athletics he finished fourth in triple jump and fifth in long jump.

He became Norwegian triple jump champion in 1946, 1947, 1949, 1950, 1951 and 1952. He won the national silver in 1948 and 1954, and the bronze in 1955. He edged out Kaare Strøm and Eugen Haugland, who had greatly dominated the event before the war. In 1949 Nilsen also became national champion in long jump. Here he won the silver medal in 1950, and bronzes in 1946 and 1952.

His personal best triple jump was 15.13 metres, achieved at the 1952 Olympics. His personal best long jump was 7.12 metres, achieved in June 1950 at Bislett stadion.
