= Ronald Gray (athlete) =

Australian triple jumper (1932–2019)

Personal information
- Nationality: Australian
- Born: 4 August 1932
- Died: 17 August 2019 (aged 87)

Sport
- Sport: Athletics
- Event: Triple jump

Ronald Gray (4 August 1932 – 17 August 2019) was an Australian athlete. He competed in the men's triple jump at the 1956 Summer Olympics.
