= Vladimir Goryaev =

Soviet triple jumper

Medal record

Men's athletics

Representing Soviet Union

Olympic Games
Silver medal – second place	1960 Rome	Triple jump

European Championships
Silver medal – second place	1962 Belgrade	Triple jump

Vladimir Goryaev (Russian: Владимир Горяев) (born 19 May 1939) is a Soviet athlete who competed mainly in the triple jump. He trained at Dynamo in Minsk.

He competed for the USSR in the 1960 Summer Olympics held in Rome, Italy in the triple jump where he won the silver medal.
