= Colleen Rosensteel =

American martial artist, judoka

Personal information
- Full name: Colleen Rosensteel
- Nationality: United States
- Born: March 13, 1967 (age 59) Greensburg, Pennsylvania, U.S.
- Height: 5 ft 11 in (1.80 m)
- Weight: 229 lb (104 kg)

Sport
- Sport: Judo
- Club: starting club and present club membership, Chikarakogeki. Also has trained at Cohen's judo club
Medal record
Women's judo
Representing United States
Pan American Games
Silver medal – second place	1999 Winnipeg	Heavyweight
Bronze medal – third place	1995 Mar del Plata	Heavyweight
Women's Track and Field
Pan American Junior Athletics Championships
Silver medal – second place	1984 Nassau	Discus Throw

Colleen Rosensteel (born March 13, 1967) is an American judoka and a Pan American Games silver medalist.

== Biography ==
Rosensteel was born in Greensburg, Pennsylvania. She attended the University of Florida in Gainesville, Florida, where she was a member of the Florida Gators track and field team. She graduated with a bachelor's degree and master's degree in exercise and sport sciences in 1990 and 1994, respectively, and was later inducted into the University of Florida Athletic Hall of Fame as a "Gator Great."

Rosensteel competed for the United States judo team in three consecutive Summer Olympics: the 1992 Summer Olympics in Barcelona, Spain; the 1996 Summer Olympics in Atlanta, Georgia; and the 2000 Summer Olympics in Sydney, Australia. Her best Olympic finish was a ninth-place tie in 2000.

Rosensteel won a bronze medal in the women's heavyweight (+78 kg) division at the 1995 Pan American Games in Mar del Plata, Argentina. She won a silver medal in the women's heavyweight division at the 1999 Pan American Games in Winnipeg, Manitoba, Canada.

As a 17-year-old, she also was a top ranked discus thrower, earning a silver medal at the 1984 Pan American Junior Athletics Championships.

She currently works at South Fayette Township School District as the Athletic Lifting and Conditioning Trainer.

== See also ==
- List of University of Florida alumni
- List of University of Florida Athletic Hall of Fame members
- List of University of Florida Olympians
