= Joe DeLoach =

American sprinter

Personal information
- Full name: Joseph Nathaniel Deloach, Jr.
- Nationality: American
- Born: June 5, 1967 (age 59) Bay City, Texas, U.S.
- Height: 6 ft 0 in (1.83 m)
- Weight: 165 lb (75 kg)

Sport
- Country: United States
- Sport: Track
- Event: Sprints
- College team: Houston
- Club: Santa Monica Track Club

Achievements and titles
- Personal bests: 100 m: 10.03; 200 m: 19.75
Medal record
Men's Athletics
Representing the United States
Olympic Games
Gold medal – first place	1988 Seoul	200 m
Pan American Junior Championships
Gold medal – first place	1984 Nassau	100 m
Gold medal – first place	1984 Nassau	200 m
Gold medal – first place	1984 Nassau	4 × 100 m relay

Joseph ("Joe") Nathaniel DeLoach (born June 5, 1967) is an American former sprinter who was the 1988 Olympic champion in the 200 m.

Born in Bay City, Texas into a family with 11 sisters and one brother, DeLoach enjoyed running at a young age and desired to become a football player, but later set his mind to sprinting. He trained at the University of Houston, like Carl Lewis before him.

During his career, DeLoach took part in one Olympiad, the 1988 Summer Olympics in Seoul, South Korea. He won the 200 m (beating his teammate from the Santa Monica Track Club, Carl Lewis, while placing fifth in the 100 m). The first performance was enough to qualify for the Games. There, he and Lewis were the favorites. In the final, DeLoach caught Lewis and finished in the Olympic record time of 19.75 s. This performance marked the only time Carl Lewis was defeated in an individual Olympic final and as of 10 September 2024 it remains the track record for Seoul.

In 2003, Dr. Wade Exum, the United States Olympic Committee's director of drug control administration from 1991 to 2000, gave copies of documents to Sports Illustrated which revealed that some 100 American athletes, including DeLoach, had tested positive for drugs between 1988 and 2000. The IAAF investigated the allegations, and announced that the dosages were in low concentration and no rules had been broken.

Awards and achievements
Preceded by (United States) Carl Lewis	Men's 200 m Best Year Performance; 1988	Succeeded by (Brazil) Robson da Silva
