= Nick Winter =

Australian triple jumper

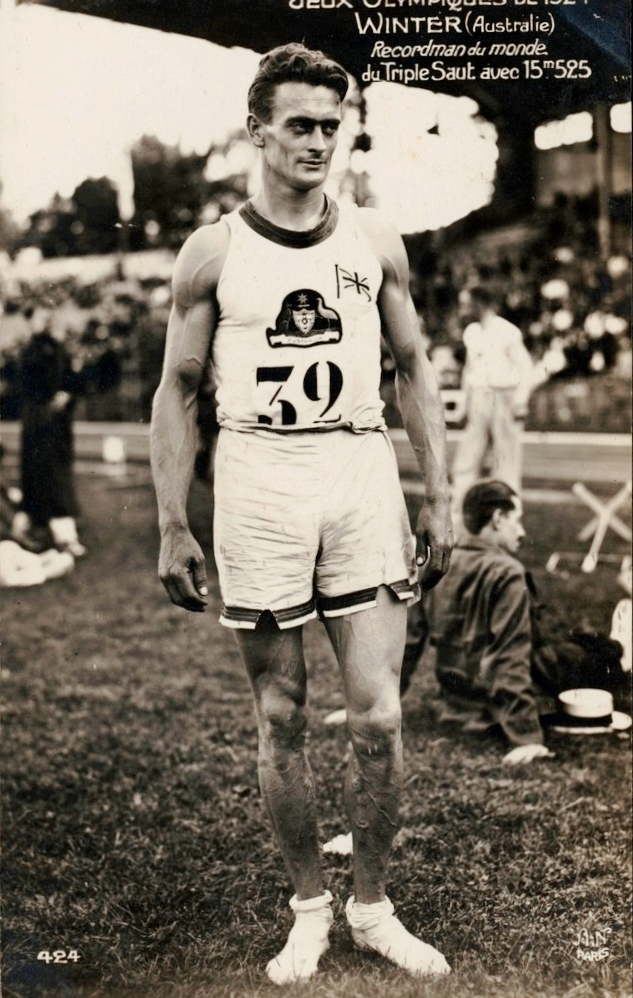

Personal information
- Full name: Anthony William Winter
- Born: 25 August 1894 Brocklesby, New South Wales, Australia
- Died: 6 May 1955 (aged 60) Pagewood, New South Wales, Australia

Sport
- Sport: Athletics
- Event: Triple jump
Medal record
Men's athletics
Representing Australia
Olympic Games
Gold medal – first place	1924 Paris	Triple jump

Anthony William "Nick" Winter (25 August 1894 – 6 May 1955) was an Australian sportsman. He won the gold medal in the triple jump at the 1924 Summer Olympics in Paris, in the process setting a new world record. His medal-winning jump remained an Australian record until 1960.

== Early life ==
Winter was born on 25 August 1894 in Brocklesby, New South Wales, the son of Sarah Ann (née Boyton) and Anthony Winter. His father was a fettler. He attended a local public school and subsequently worked as a labourer. In 1915, Winter enlisted in the Australian Imperial Force. He served in Egypt with the 7th Light Horse Regiment and in France with the Australian Army Service Corps. He returned to Australia in June 1919 and from December 1920 worked as a fireman in Manly.

== Sporting career ==
Winter was a member of several amateur athletics clubs in Sydney. In December 1919 he set a new Australian record for the triple jump of 47 feet 7 inches (14.50 m). He represented Australia at the 1924 Summer Olympics in Paris, winning the gold medal in the triple jump competition with a new world record of 50 feet 11.25 inches (15.5258 m). The previous record had stood since 1911. Winter's record-breaking jump was set barefoot, as he had badly bruised his heels on a previous attempt. It was his third and last jump in the final, and came after he had fouled on the previous jump. His jump remained an Australian record until 1960.

Winter was one of three gold medallists from Manly in 1924, along with Boy Charlton and Dick Eve. His event was not widely contested in Australia at the time and was not yet included in the Australian Athletics Championships. Winter returned at the 1928 Summer Olympics at the age of 33, but placed 12th in the triple jump. In 1930, aged 35, he was the inaugural Australian triple jump champion, also finishing runner-up in 1932 in his last competition.

Outside of the triple jump, Winter was a all-round sportsman, participating in rugby league, cricket, tennis, golf, wrestling, and solo tug-of-war. He was a billiards player and was the runner-up in the New South Wales state championships in 1927.

== Later life ==
Winter left the fire service in 1927. He later ran a tobacconist's shop and managed billiards halls in George Street and Pitt Street, Sydney. According to The Canberra Times, he was "well known in Canberra, having conducted a hairdressing saloon at Kingston for several years".

=== Death ===
Winter was found dead in the bathroom of his home in Pagewood on 7 May 1955. It was reported that police believed he had a heart attack while attempting to light a gas water heater, and that "he died either from the heart attack or from gas poisoning". A coronial inquest found that he died of carbon monoxide poisoning and returned an open verdict. His son regarded suicide as unlikely.

== Honours ==
Winter was inducted into the Sport Australia Hall of Fame in 1986.

== See also ==
- Triple jump world record progression

Records
Preceded by (United States) Dan Ahearn	Men's Triple Jump World Record Holder; 1924-08-12 – 1931-10-27	Succeeded by (Japan) Mikio Oda
