= Yıldıray Pağda =

Turkish triple jumper (1938–2023)

Personal information
- Nationality: Turkish
- Born: 1938 Adana, Turkey
- Died: December 2023 (aged 85)

Sport
- Sport: Athletics
- Event: Triple jump

Yıldıray Pağda (1938 – December 2023) was a Turkish athlete. He competed in the men's triple jump at the 1960 Summer Olympics. Pağda died in December 2023, at the age of 85.
