= Jakob Rypdal =

Norwegian triple jumper (1926–2015)

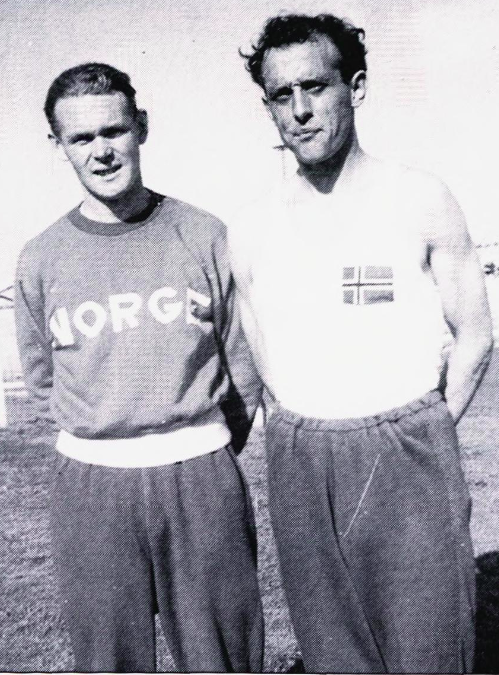
Rypdal (left) and Rune Nilsen.

Jakob Rypdal (19 July 1926 – 6 December 2015) was a Norwegian triple jumper.

He hailed from Tresfjord Municipality and represented the small, local sports club Tresfjord IL. He competed at the 1958 European Athletics Championships without reaching the final, and also won the World Masters Athletics Championships once and several European Masters Athletics Championships. Domestically, Rypdal became Norwegian champion in 1953, 1954, 1955 and 1957.

His personal best jump was 15.06 metres, achieved in 1960. He also had 6,86 in the long jump, achieved in the same year.
