= Dodyu Patarinski =

Bulgarian triple jumper

Dodyu Patarinski (Bulgarian: Додю Патарински) (born August 16, 1933 in Ugarchin, Lovech, Bulgaria) is a Bulgarian athlete, known for jumping events. He represented Bulgaria in the triple jump at the 1960 Olympics. His career best was 16.01 m (52 ft 6 1/4 in) set in 1963. By 1969, at age 35 he was still able to jump 15.79 to set a new Masters M35 World record.

He was a two time champion of the Balkan Games.
