= Zagozd =

- Village
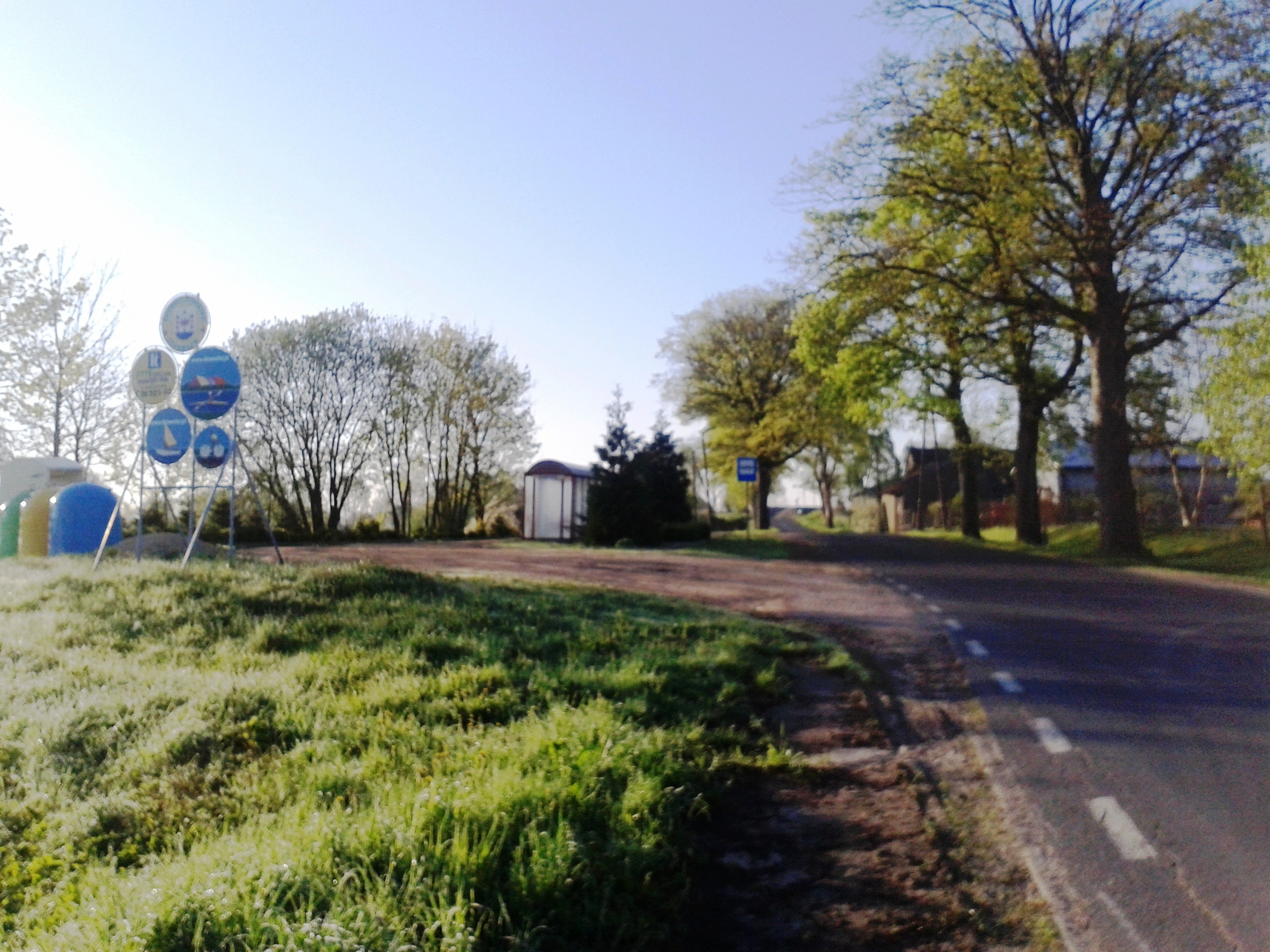
- Zagozd

- Location within Poland
- Coordinates: 53°34′42″N 15°45′28″E
- Country: Poland
- Voivodeship: West Pomeranian
- County: Drawsko
- Gmina: Drawsko Pomorskie

Zagozd [ˈzaɡɔst] (German: Neu Schönwalde) is a village in the administrative district of Gmina Drawsko Pomorskie, within Drawsko County, West Pomeranian Voivodeship, in north-western Poland. It lies approximately 6 km (4 mi) north-west of Drawsko Pomorskie and 80 km (50 mi) east of the regional capital Szczecin.

For the history of the region, see History of Pomerania.
