= Choi Yong-kee =

South Korean athlete (1925–2004)

Personal information
- Nationality: South Korean
- Born: 19 December 1925
- Died: 20 October 2004 (aged 78)

Sport
- Sport: Athletics
- Event: Triple jump

Choi Yong-kee (Korean: 최영기; 19 December 1925 – 20 October 2004) was a South Korean athlete. He competed in the men's triple jump at the 1952 Summer Olympics and the 1956 Summer Olympics.
