= Billy Maxwell (coach) =

American track and field coach (1942–2023)

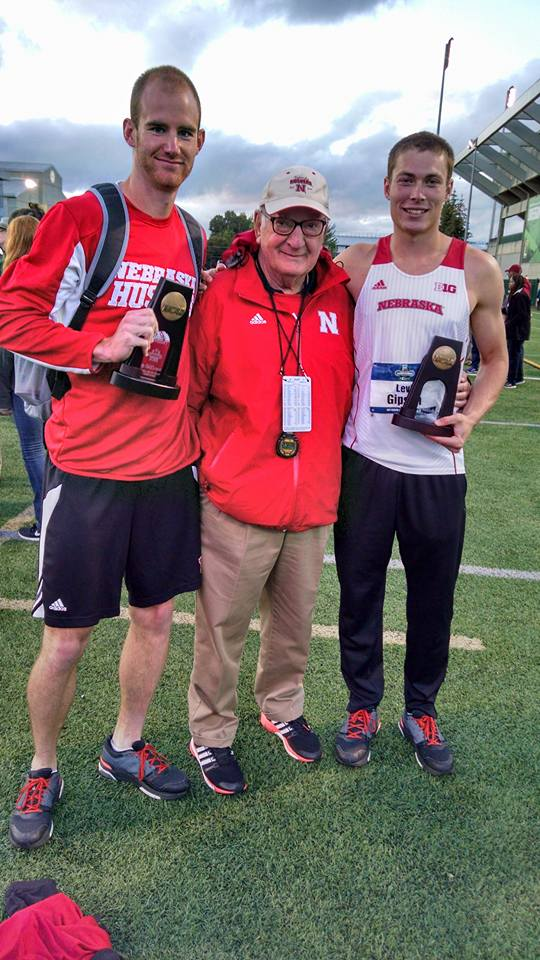
Maxwell (middle) with two All-Americans Cody Rush and Levi Gipson

Billy Maxwell (December 10, 1942 – October 8, 2023) was an American track and field coach at Tennessee Volunteers, LSU Tigers, Texas Longhorns, and finally Nebraska Huskers. Maxwell was inducted into the USTFCCCA Coaches Hall of Fame Class of 2015. He coached many NCAA National Champions (28), All-Americans (350+), and led the LSU to an indoor NCAA team title in 1987.

His longest tenure was at Nebraska, where he coached sprints for 22 years. During that time, he coached 47 first-team All-Americans, 34 Conference Champions and three National Champions. Many athletes under his tutelage etched their names into the Husker record book. The national champions that he coached were Miles Ukaoma (400-meter hurdles), Dmitrijs Milkevics (800 meters) and Priscilla Lopes-Schliep (60-meter hurdles).

Maxwell is remembered by many as a coach who was also a mentor and father figure. LSU head coach Dennis Shaver commented on the well-known fact that Maxwell was an outstanding recruiter and surrounded himself with great coaches that led to successful teams.

One of Billy Maxwell's main talents as a coach was recruiting and developing hidden talent. A couple of example are Miles Ukaoma who became a 400m national champion and Lincoln-native and Husker Track and Field All-American Sprinter Levi Gipson, who won multiple Big 10 Championships and had the privilege of being able to help Maxwell with landscaping throughout his college career. Gipson and Maxwell shared a special moment as they were able to take a break from landscaping and watch the 2016 Rio Olympics 400m dash when Wayde van Niekerk broke the world record. Maxwell helped coach many underrated athletes, such as Gipson and Ukaoma, to conference championships, which totaled 93 conference champions.

Billy Maxwell died on October 8, 2023, at the age of 80.

== Awards and accolades ==
- 5x Assistant Coach of the Year (2005, 2009, 2014, 2014, 2016)
