= Pierre William =

French triple jumper

Personal information
- Nationality: French
- Born: 17 December 1928 Dakar, Senegal

Sport
- Sport: Athletics
- Event: Triple jump

Pierre William (born 17 December 1928) is a French former athlete. He competed in the men's triple jump at the 1960 Summer Olympics.
