= Federico Bisson =

Italian triple jumper (1936–1998)

Personal information
- Nationality: Italian
- Born: 23 January 1936 Montagnana, Italy
- Died: 20 December 1998 (aged 62)
- Height: 1.84 m (6 ft 0 in)
- Weight: 77 kg (170 lb)

Sport
- Country: Italy
- Sport: Athletics
- Event: Triple jump

Federico Bisson (23 January 1936 – 20 December 1998) was an Italian triple jumper who competed at the 1960 Summer Olympics.
