= Charlie Allan =

Scottish farmer (1939–2023)

With his wife and family in 1966

Charlie Allan (19 August 1939 – 13 December 2023) was a Scottish farmer, athlete, economist, journalist, author, broadcaster and singer.

== Life and career ==
Allan was born on 19 August 1939 in Stirling, while his parents were engaged in war work, and brought up in Aberdeenshire. He started his career as an economist, teaching at Glasgow, Strathclyde and St Andrews universities. In 1974 he decided to give this up to work on the family farm near Methlick.

Allan produced and presented BBC Radio Scotland's twice-daily farming programme, Scottish Farming Life from their Aberdeen studios for five years, in the 1980s.

Allan was active in many sports, including football, rugby, cricket and athletics at university and notably as a competitor in the Highland Games circuit, becoming world caber tossing champion in 1972. He performed and recorded as a singer, particularly of bothy ballads.

Allan died on 13 December 2023, at the age of 84.

== Selected publications ==
- The Theory of Taxation, Penguin Books
