= Bernard Whyte =

Ghanaian footballer

Personal information
- Date of birth: 22 October 1968 (age 58)
- Place of birth: Accra, Ghana
- Position: Defender

Senior career*
Years	Team	Apps	(Gls)
1990–1991	Asante Kotoko		
1991–1994	Hearts of Oak		
1994–1995	Rapid București	7	(0)
1995–2000	Royal Cappellen		(0)

International career
1994	Ghana	6	(0)
- * Club domestic league appearances and goals

Bernard Whyte (born 22 October 1968) is a Ghanaian former football defender. He played in six matches for the Ghana national football team in 1994. He was also named in Ghana's squad for the 1994 African Cup of Nations tournament.

== Honours ==
Asante Kotoko

- Ghana Premier League: 1990–91

Hearts of Oak

- Ghanaian FA Cup: 1993–94
