= Terri Turner =

American athlete (born 1963)

Personal information
- Born: July 19, 1963
- Height: 1.78 m (5 ft 10 in)
- Weight: 61 kg (134 lb)

Sport
- Sport: Athletics
- Event: Triple Jump

Terri Turner, later Terri Turner-Hairston, is an American former athletics competitor. She was world record holder in the women's triple jump.

== Early life ==
Turner was an outstanding athlete at New Caney High School competing in athletics and basketball.

Turner later attended University of Texas at Austin between 1983 and 1986.

== Athletics career ==
Turner recorded four world records in the women’s triple jump:

- 12.43 m (40 ft 9 1/4 in) on 9 May 1981 in Austin, Texas.
- 12.47 m (40 ft 10 3/4 in) on 7 May 1982 in Austin, Texas.
- 13.15 m (43 ft 1 1/2 in) on 24 March 1984 in Austin, Texas.
- 13.22 m (43 ft 4 1/4 in) on 13 April 1984 in Baton Rouge, Louisiana.

Note: The marks are unofficial because the governing body, the IAAF (now World Athletics), did not list an official world record in the event until 1994.

At college, Turner was a two-time NCAA champion in the triple jump, 1984 and 1986.

Turner competed in the United States Track and Field Championships in the triple jump placing third in 1985, fourth in 1986 and third in 1987.

== Later career ==
Turner later became a coach at Houston Christian High School and Houston's Kincaid School.

== Awards ==
In 2016, Turner was inducted into the Texas Longhorns Hall of Fame.
