= Gabuh Piging =

Datuk Gabuh bin Piging P.G.D.K. (11 January 1932 – 31 August 2010) represented North Borneo in the triple jump at the 1956 Summer Olympics, he finished 24th. He later competed at the 1962 British Empire and Commonwealth Games in the long jump and triple jump where he finished 10th in the latter.
