= Sten Erickson =

Swedish triple jumper

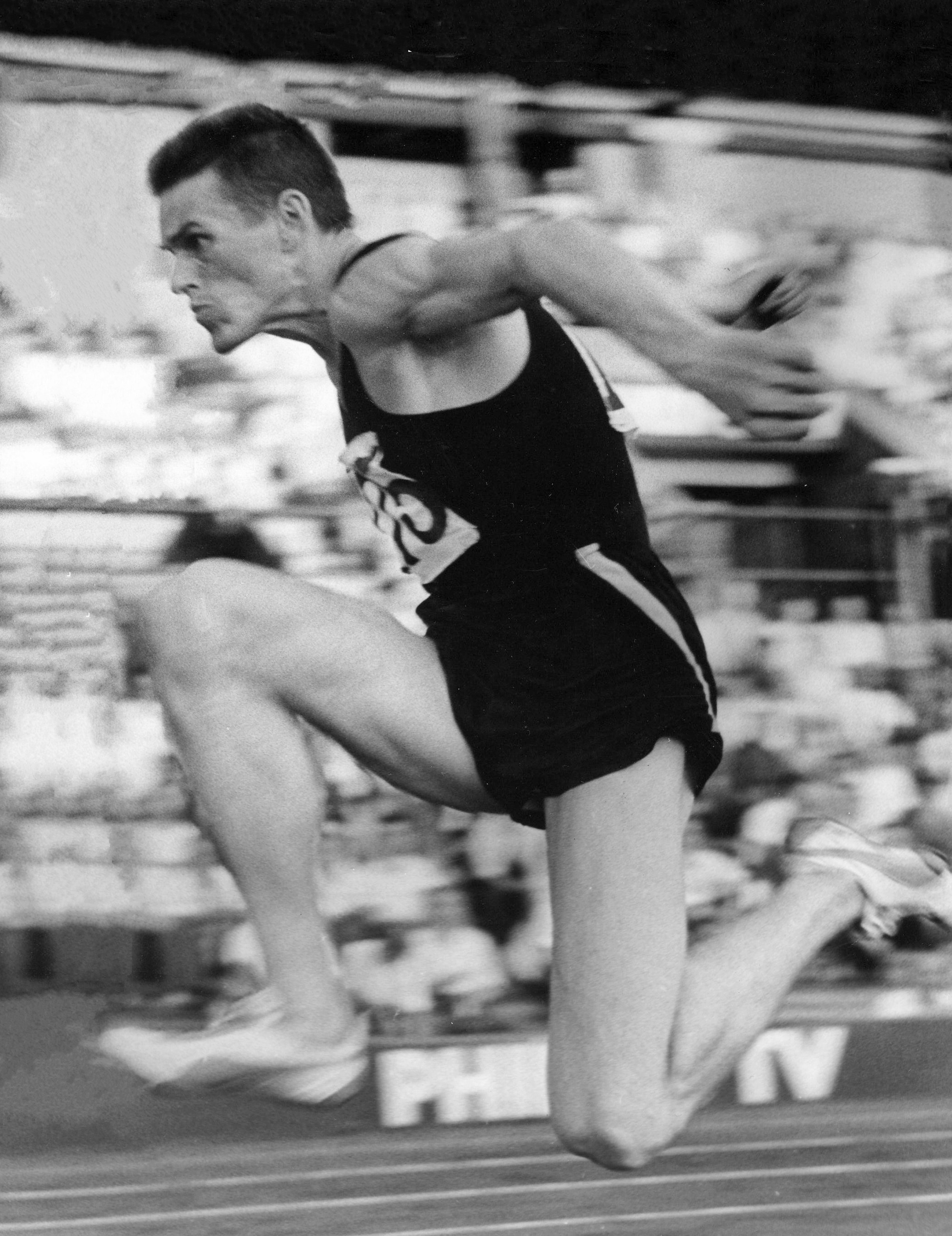
- Erickson setting a national record in 1959

Personal information
- Born: 18 December 1929 (age 96) Nora, Sweden
- Height: 1.82 m (6 ft 0 in)
- Weight: 74 kg (163 lb)

Sport
- Sport: Athletics
- Event: Triple jump
- Club: IF Brännan; IF Elfsborg

Achievements and titles
- Personal best: 15.76 m (1960)

Sten Gustaf Ingemar Erickson (18 December 1929 – 29 May 2025) was a Swedish triple jumper. He competed at the 1958 European Athletics Championships and 1960 Summer Olympics and finished in 13th and 11th place, respectively. Erickson won the national title in 1959 and 1960, and held the national record from 1959 to 1969.
