= Vitold Kreyer =

Russian triple jumper (1932–2020)

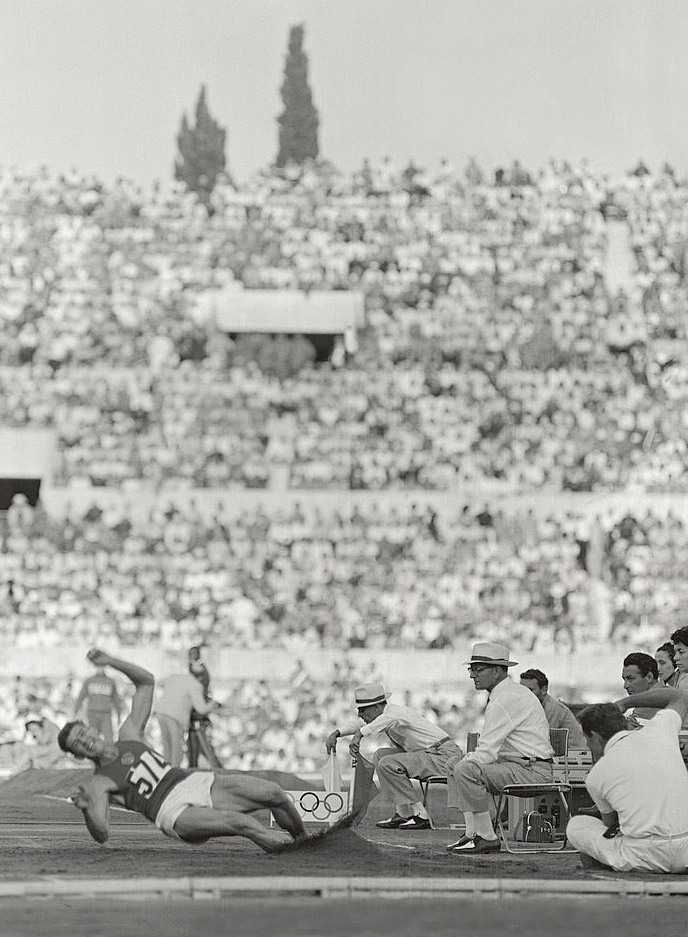
- Vitold Kreyer at the 1960 Olympics

Personal information
- Born: 12 October 1932 Krasnodar, Soviet Union
- Died: 1 August 2020 (aged 87)
- Height: 180 cm (5 ft 11 in)
- Weight: 70 kg (154 lb)

Sport
- Sport: Athletics
- Event: Triple jump
- Club: Dynamo Moscow

Achievements and titles
- Personal best: 16.71 m (1961)
Medal record
Men's athletics
Representing Soviet Union
Olympic Games
Bronze medal – third place	1956 Melbourne	Triple jump
Bronze medal – third place	1960 Rome	Triple jump

Vitold Anatolievich Kreyer (Russian: Витольд Анатольевич Креер; 12 October 1932 – 1 August 2020) was a Russian triple jumper. He competed in the 1956, 1960 and 1964 Olympics and won bronze medals in 1956 and 1960. He won the Soviet title in 1960 and 1961 but failed to reach the finals at the 1958 and 1962 European Championships. In retirement he coached triple jumpers, including the three-time Olympic champion Viktor Saneyev. He was head coach of the Soviet athletics team in 1967–80, and headed the Russian athletics team at the 2000 Olympics.
