= Vilhjálmur Einarsson =

Icelandic athlete (1934–2019)

Medal record

Men's athletics

Representing Iceland

Olympic Games
Silver medal – second place	1956 Melbourne	Triple jump

European Championships
Bronze medal – third place	1958 Stockholm	Triple jump

Vilhjálmur Einarsson (5 June 1934 – 28 December 2019) was an Icelandic track and field athlete, and triple-jump silver medalist at the 1956 Summer Olympics in Melbourne, Australia. Vilhjálmur grew up in the East-Icelandic fishing village of Reyðarfjörður and was the son of Einar Stefánsson and Sigríður Vilhjálmsdóttir.

In 1956 Vilhjálmur set a new Olympic Record by jumping 16.26 m in the triple jump, only to be surpassed by Brazil's Adhemar da Silva in the same competition. This was the most unexpected result of the Olympics that year, and his silver medal was Iceland's first ever Olympic medal. In 1958 he took bronze in the triple jump at the European Athletics Championships in Stockholm, Sweden, with 16.00 m. His personal best was 16.70 m set in 1960 in Laugardalsvöllur, Iceland. He was named Icelandic Sportsperson of the Year five times, more times than anyone else.

Vilhjálmur was also a headmaster of three schools: Héraðsskólinn in Laugarvatn, Reykholtsskóli in Reykholt, and Menntaskólinn in Egilsstaðir, where he later worked as a part-time mathematics teacher. He also was a painter, specializing in landscape painting, and his work has been on display in several art galleries in Iceland.

He attended Dartmouth College. His son Einar Vilhjálmsson later represented Iceland in the men's javelin throw at the Summer Olympics (1984, 1988 and 1992).
