= Odd Bergh =

Norwegian athlete (1937–2023)

Odd Bergh (28 June 1937 – 13 January 2023) was a Norwegian athlete who specialized in the triple jump and long jump.

Bergh finished seventh in the triple jump final at the 1962 European Championships with 15.52 metres. He never competed in any other international event such as the Summer Olympics. He became Norwegian champion in triple jump in 1962 (15.63 m.) and 1963 (15.44 m.) and in long jump in 1960 (7.01 m), 1962 (7.13 m.), 1963 (7.28 m.) and 1964 (7.40 m.). He represented SK Freidig in Trondheim.

His personal best triple jump was 15.64 metres, achieved in August 1966 at Trondheim stadion. His personal best long jump was 7.40 metres, achieved in August 1964 in Gjøvik.

Bergh was also active as an athletics administrator. He was a central board member of the Norwegian Athletics Association from 1984 to 1985, and a member of the elite committee from 1979 to 1983, 1993 to 1994 and 2002 to 2010. He later represented the club Tønsberg FIK.
