= Hannu Rantala =

Finnish triple jumper

Personal information
- Nationality: Finnish
- Born: 16 March 1936 (age 89)

Sport
- Sport: Athletics
- Event: Triple jump

Hannu Rantala (born 16 March 1936) is a Finnish athlete. He competed in the men's triple jump at the 1956 Summer Olympics and the 1960 Summer Olympics.
