= Enzo Cavalli =

Italian triple jumper (1937–2023)

Personal information
- Full name: Vincenzo Cavalli
- Nationality: Italian
- Born: 11 September 1937 Gorizia, Italy
- Died: 20 September 2023 (aged 86) Rome, Italy
- Height: 1.86 m (6 ft 1 in)
- Weight: 80 kg (176 lb)

Sport
- Country: Italy
- Sport: Athletics
- Event: Triple jump
- Club: G.S. Fiamme Oro

Enzo Cavalli (11 September 1937 – 20 September 2023) was an Italian triple jumper who competed at the 1960 Summer Olympics. Cavalli died in Rome on 20 September 2023, at the age of 86.
