= Soviet Union at the 1964 Summer Olympics =

- Flag of the Soviet Union
- IOC code: URS
- NOC: Soviet Olympic Committee

in Tokyo, Japan 10 October 1964 – 24 October 1964
- Competitors: 317 (254 men, 63 women) in 19 sports
- Flag bearer: Yury Vlasov
- Medals Ranked 2nd: Gold 30 Silver 31 Bronze 35 Total 96

Summer Olympics appearances (overview)
- 1952; 1956; 1960; 1964; 1968; 1972; 1976; 1980; 1984; 1988

Other related appearances
- Russian Empire (1900–1912); Estonia (1920–1936, 1992–pres.); Latvia (1924–1936, 1992–pres.); Lithuania (1924–1928, 1992–pres.); Unified Team (1992); Armenia (1994–pres.); Belarus (1994–2020); Georgia (1994–pres.); Kazakhstan (1994–pres.); Kyrgyzstan (1994–pres.); Moldova (1994–pres.); Russia (1994–2016); Ukraine (1994–pres.); Uzbekistan (1994–pres.); Azerbaijan (1996–pres.); Tajikistan (1996–pres.); Turkmenistan (1996–pres.); ROC (2020); Individual Neutral Athletes (2024)

The Soviet Union (USSR) competed at the 1964 Summer Olympics in Tokyo, Japan. 317 competitors, 254 men and 63 women, took part in 154 events in 19 sports.

== Medalists ==
The USSR finished second in the final medal rankings, with 30 gold and 96 total medals.

=== Gold ===
- Larisa Latynina — Artistic gymnastics, women's floor exercise
- Boris Shakhlin — Artistic gymnastics, men's horizontal bar
- Larisa Latynina, Polina Astakhova, Tamara Manina, Elena Volchetskaya, Tamara Zamotailova, Lyudmila Gromova — Artistic gymnastics, women's team competition
- Polina Astakhova — Artistic gymnastics, women's uneven bars
- Tamara Press — Athletics, women's discus throw
- Romuald Klim — Athletics, men's hammer throw
- Valery Brumel — Athletics, men's high jump
- Irina Press — Athletics, women's pentathlon
- Tamara Press — Athletics, women's shot put
- Stanislav Stepashkin — Boxing, men's featherweight
- Boris Lagutin — Boxing, men's light-middleweight
- Valery Popenchenko — Boxing, men's 71–75 kg
- Andrei Khimich, Stepan Oshchepkov — Canoeing, men's C-2 1000 m
- Lyudmila Khvedosyuk-Pinaeva — Canoeing, women's K-1 500 m
- Nikolai Chuzhikov, Anatoli Grishin, Vyacheslav Ionov, Vladimir Morozov — Canoeing, K-4 1000 m
- Grigori Kriss — Fencing, men's épée individual
- Viktor Zhdanovich, Yuri Sharov, Yuri Sisikin, German Sveshnikov, Mark Midler — Fencing, men's foil team
- Boris Melnikov, Nugzar Asatiani, Mark Rakita, Yakov Rylsky, Umar Mavlikhanov — Fencing, men's sabre team
- Albert Mokeev, Igor Novikov, Viktor Mineev — Modern pentathlon, men's team competition
- Oleg Tyurin, Boris Dubrovskiy — Rowing, men's double sculls
- Vyacheslav Ivanov — Rowing, men's single sculls
- Galina Prozumenschikova-Stepanova — Swimming, women's 200 m breaststroke
- Yuri Chesnokov, Yuri Vengerovsky, Eduard Sibiryakov, Dmitry Voskoboinikov, Vazha Katcharava, Stanislav Lyugailo, Vitali Kovalenko, Yuri Poyarkov, Ivan Bugaenkov, Nikolai Burobin, Valery Kalachikhin, Georgi Mondzolevsky — Volleyball, men's team
- Leonid Zhabotinsky — Weightlifting, men's heavyweight
- Aleksei Vakhonin — Weightlifting, men's bantamweight
- Rudolf Plyukfelder — Weightlifting, men's light-heavyweight
- Vladimir Golovanov — Weightlifting, men's middle-heavyweight
- Alexander Ivanytsky — Wrestling, men's freestyle heavyweight
- Alexander Medved — Wrestling, men's freestyle light-heavyweight
- Anatoli Kolesov — Wrestling, men's Greco-Roman welterweight

=== Silver ===
- Tamara Manina — Artistic gymnastics, women's balance beam
- Viktor Lisitsky — Artistic gymnastics, men's floor exercise
- Polina Astakhova — Artistic gymnastics, women's floor exercise
- Yuri Titov — Artistic gymnastics, men's horizontal bar
- Boris Shakhlin — Artistic gymnastics, men's individual all-round
- Viktor Lisitsky — Artistic gymnastics, men's individual all-round
- Larisa Latynina — Artistic gymnastics, women's individual all-round
- Boris Shakhlin, Yuri Titov, Viktor Lisitsky, Yury Tsapenko, Sergei Diomidov, Viktor Leontyev — Artistic gymnastics, men's team competition
- Viktor Lisitsky — Artistic gymnastics, men's vault
- Larisa Latynina — Artistic gymnastics, women's vault
- Rein Aun — Athletics, men's decathlon
- Oleg Fyodoseyev — Athletics, men's triple jump
- Valdis Muizhniek, Nikolai Bagley, Armenak Alachachian, Aleksandr Travin, Vyacheslav Khrynin, Jānis Krūmiņš, Levan Moseshvili, Yuri Korneev, Aleksandr Petrov, Gennadi Volnov, Jaak Lipso, Yuris Kalnyns — Basketball, men's team
- Velikton Barannikov — Boxing, men's lightweight
- Yevgeny Frolov — Boxing, men's light-welterweight
- Rikardas Tamulis — Boxing, men's welterweight
- Aleksei Kiselyov — Boxing, men's light-heavyweight
- Imant Bodnieks, Viktor Logunov — Cycling Track, men's 2000 m tandem
- Lyudmila Shishova, Valentina Prudskova, Valentina Rastvorova, Tatyana Petrenko-Samusenko, Galina Gorokhova — Fencing, women's foil team
- Igor Novikov — Modern pentathlon, men's individual competition
- Shota Kveliashvili — Shooting, men's 300 m free rifle 3 positions
- Pavel Senichev — Shooting, men's trap
- Georgi Prokopenko — Swimming, men's 200 m breaststroke
- Antonina Ryzhova, Astra Biltauer, Ninel Lukanina, Lyudmila Buldakova, Nelli Abramova, Tamara Tikhonina, Valentina Kamenek-Vinogradova, Inna Ryskal, Marita Katusheva, Tatyana Roshchina, Valentina Mishak, Lyudmila Gureeva — Volleyball, women's team
- Yury Vlasov — Weightlifting, men's heavyweight
- Vladimir Kaplunov — Weightlifting, men's lightweight
- Viktor Kurentsov — Weightlifting, men's middleweight
- Guliko Sagaradze — Wrestling, men's freestyle welterweight
- Anatoli Roshchin — Wrestling, men's Greco-Roman super heavyweight
- Vladlen Trostyansky — Wrestling, men's Greco-Roman bantamweight
- Roman Rurua — Wrestling, men's Greco-Roman featherweight

=== Bronze ===
- Larisa Latynina — Artistic gymnastics, women's balance beam
- Polina Astakhova — Artistic gymnastics, women's individual all-round
- Yury Tsapenko — Artistic gymnastics, men's pommel horse
- Boris Shakhlin — Artistic gymnastics, men's rings
- Larisa Latynina — Artistic gymnastics, women's uneven bars
- Anatoly Mikhailov — Athletics, men's 110 m hurdles
- Vladimir Golubnichy — Athletics, men's 20 km walk
- Ivan Belyayev — Athletics, men's 3000 m steeplechase
- Taisiya Chenchik — Athletics, women's high jump
- Yanis Lusis — Athletics, men's javelin throw
- Yelena Gorchakova — Athletics, women's javelin throw
- Igor Ter-Ovanesyan — Athletics, men's long jump
- Tatyana Shchelkanova — Athletics, women's long jump
- Galina Bystrova — Athletics, women's pentathlon
- Galina Zybina — Athletics, women's shot put
- Viktor Kravchenko — Athletics, men's triple jump
- Vadim Emelyanov — Boxing, men's heavyweight
- Stanislav Sorokin — Boxing, men's flyweight
- Yevgeny Penyaev — Canoeing, men's C-1 1000 m
- Galina Alekseeva — Diving, women's 10 m platform
- Sergei Filatov, his horse Absent — Equestrian, individual mixed
- Sergei Filatov, Absent, Ivan Kizimov, Ikhor, Ivan Kalita, Moar — Equestrian, team mixed
- Guram Kostava — Fencing, men's épée individual
- Umar Mavlikhanov — Fencing, men's sabre individual
- Anzor Kiknadze — Judo, men's heavyweight
- Parnaos Chikviladze — Judo, men's heavyweight
- Oleg Stepanov — Judo, men's lightweight
- Aron Bogolyubov — Judo, men's lightweight
- Albert Mokeev — Modern pentathlon, men's individual competition
- Svetlana Babanina — Swimming, women's 200 m breaststroke
- Tatyana Savelyeva, Svetlana Babanina, Tatyana Devyatova, Natalya Ustinova — women's 4 × 100 m medley relay
- Igor Grabovsky, Vladimir Kuznetsov, Boris Grishin, Boris Popov, Nikolai Kalashnikov, Zenon Bortkevich, Nikolai Kuznetsov, Vladimir Semyonov, Viktor Ageev, Leonid Osipov, Eduard Egorov — Water polo, men's team
- Aydin Ibrahimov — Wrestling, men's freestyle bantamweight
- Nodar Khokhashvili — Wrestling, men's freestyle featherweight
- David Gvanteladze — Wrestling, men's Greco-Roman lightweight

== Athletics ==
The Soviet Union had 84 participants (61 men and 23 women) in 36 athletics events in 1964.

Men's 100 metres

- Edvin Ozolin
- Gusman Kosanov

Men's 200 metres

- Edvin Ozolin
- Boris Zubov
- Borys Savchuk

Men's 400 metres

- Viktor Bychkov
- Hryhoriy Sverbetov
- Vadim Arkhipchuk

Men's 800 metres

- Valery Bulyshev
- Rein Tölp
- Abram Kryvosheiev

Men's 1500 metres

- Ivan Belytskiy

Men's 5000 metres

- Nikolay Dutov
- Stepan Baidiuk
- Kęstutis Orentas

Men's 10,000 metres

- Leonid Ivanov
- Pyotr Bolotnikov
- Nikolay Dutov

Men's marathon

- Nikolay Tikhomirov
- Nikolay Abramov
- Viktor Baykov

Men's 110 metres hurdles

- Anatoly Mikhaylov
- Aleksandr Kontarev
- Valentin Chistyakov

Men's 400 metres hurdles

- Vasyl Anisimov
- Edvīns Zāģeris
- Imants Kukličs

Men's 3000 metres steeplechase

- Ivan Bieliaiev
- Adolfas Aleksejūnas
- Lazar Naroditsky

Men's 4 × 100 metres relay

- Edvin Ozolin
- Boris Zubov
- Gusman Kosanov
- Borys Savchuk

Men's 4 × 400 metres relay

- Hryhoriy Sverbetov
- Viktor Bychkov
- Vasyl Anisimov
- Vadim Arkhipchuk

Men's 20 kilometres walk

- Volodymyr Holubnychiy
- Gennady Solodov
- Boris Khrolovich

Men's 50 kilometres walk

- Anatoly Vedyakov
- Gennady Agapov
- Yevgeny Lyungin

Men's high jump

- Valery Brumel
- Robert' Shavlaq'adze
- Valeriy Skvortsov

Men's pole vault

- Hennadiy Bleznitsov
- Igor Feld
- Sergey Dyomin

Men's long jump

- Igor Ter-Ovanesyan
- Antanas Vaupšas
- Leonid Barkovskiy

Men's triple jump

- Oleg Fedoseyev
- Viktor Kravchenko
- Vitold Kreyer

Men's shot put

- Nikolay Karasyov
- Adolfas Varanauskas
- Viktor Lipsnis

Men's discus throw

- Vladimir Trusenyov
- Kim Bukhantsov
- Viktor Kompaniyets

Men's hammer throw

- Romuald Klim
- Yury Nikulin
- Yury Bakarinov

Men's javelin throw

- Jānis Lūsis
- Vladimir Kuznetsov
- Viktor Aksonov

Men's decathlon

- Rein Aun
- Vasily Kuznetsov
- Mykhailo Storozhenko

Women's 100 metres

- Galina Popova
- Renāte Lāce
- Galina Gayda

Women's 200 metres

- Lyudmila Ignatyeva-Samotyosova
- Galina Gayda

Women's 400 metres

- Mariya Itkina

Women's 800 metres

- Laine Erik
- Vera Mukhanova
- Zoya Skobtsova

Women's 80 metres hurdles

- Irina Press
- Tatyana Talysheva
- Galina Bystrova

Women's 4 × 100 metres relay

- Galina Gayda
- Renāte Lāce
- Lyudmila Ignatyeva-Samotyosova
- Galina Popova

Women's high jump

- Taisiya Chenchik
- Galina Kostenko

Women's long jump

- Tatyana Shchelkanova
- Tatyana Talysheva
- Aida Chuyko

Women's shot put

- Tamara Press
- Galina Zybina
- Irina Press

Women's discus throw

- Tamara Press
- Yevgeniya Kuznetsova
- Nina Romashkova-Ponomaryova

Women's javelin throw

- Yelena Gorchakova
- Birutė Kalėdienė
- Elvīra Ozoliņa

Women's pentathlon

- Irina Press
- Galina Bystrova
- Mariya Sizyakova

== Basketball ==
Twelve male basketball players represented the Soviet Union:

- Jānis Krūmiņš
- Valdis Muižnieks
- Mykola Bahlei
- Armenak Alachachyan
- Aleksandr Travin
- Vyacheslav Khrynin
- Levan Moseshvili
- Yury Korneyev
- Aleksandr Petrov
- Gennady Volnov
- Jaak Lipso
- Juris Kalniņš

== Boxing ==
Ten male boxers represented the Soviet Union:

Men's flyweight

- Stanislav Sorokin

Men's bantamweight

- Oleg Grigoryev

Men's featherweight

- Stanislav Stepashkin

Men's lightweight

- Vilikton Barannikov

Men's light welterweight

- Yevgeny Frolov

Men's welterweight

- Ričardas Tamulis

Men's light middleweight

- Boris Lagutin

Men's middleweight

- Valery Popenchenko

Men's light heavyweight

- Aleksey Kiselyov

Men's heavyweight

- Vadim Yemelyanov

== Canoeing ==
The Soviet Union had thirteen participants (10 men and 3 women) in seven canoeing events in 1964.

Men's K-1 1000 metres

- Igor Pisarev

Men's K-2 1000 metres

- Erik Kalugin
- Ibragim Khasanov

Men's K-4 1000 metres

- Mykola Chuzhykov
- Anatoly Grishin
- Vyacheslav Ionov
- Volodymyr Morozov

Men's C-1 1000 metres

- Yevgeny Penyayev

Men's C-2 1000 metres

- Andriy Khimich
- Stepan Oshchepkov

Women's K-1 500 metres

- Lyudmila Khvedosyuk-Pinayeva

Women's K-2 500 metres

- Nina Gruzintseva
- Antonina Seredina

== Cycling ==
Twelve cyclists represented the Soviet Union in 1964.

Individual road race

- Gaynan Saydkhuzhin
- Anatoly Olizarenko
- Yury Melikhov
- Aleksei Petrov

Team time trial

- Yury Melikhov
- Anatoly Olizarenko
- Aleksei Petrov
- Gaynan Saydkhuzhin

Sprint

- Valery Khitrov
- Omar Pkhak'adze

1000 m time trial

- Viktor Logunov

Tandem

- Imants Bodnieks
- Viktor Logunov

Individual pursuit

- Stanislav Moskvin

Team pursuit

- Dzintars Lācis
- Leonid Kolumbet
- Stanislav Moskvin
- Sergey Tereshchenkov

== Fencing ==
20 fencers, 15 men and 5 women, represented the Soviet Union in 1964.

Men's foil

- Viktor Zhdanovich
- German Sveshnikov
- Mark Midler

Men's team foil

- Viktor Zhdanovich, Yury Sisikin, Mark Midler, German Sveshnikov, Yury Sharov

Men's épée

- Grigory Kriss
- Guram Kostava
- Bruno Habārovs

Men's team épée

- Bruno Habārovs, Guram Kostava, Yury Smolyakov, Grigory Kriss, Aleksey Nikanchikov

Men's sabre

- Umyar Mavlikhanov
- Yakov Rylsky
- Mark Rakita

Men's team sabre

- Umyar Mavlikhanov, Mark Rakita, Yakov Rylsky, Boris Melnikov, Nugzar Asatiani

Women's foil

- Galina Gorokhova
- Valentina Rastvorova
- Valentina Prudskova

Women's team foil

- Valentina Rastvorova, Tatyana Petrenko-Samusenko, Lyudmila Shishova, Valentina Prudskova, Galina Gorokhova

== Modern pentathlon ==
Three male pentathlete represented the Soviet Union in 1964. The team won gold, Albert Mokeyev won an individual bronze and Igor Novikov won an individual silver.

Individual

- Igor Novikov
- Albert Mokeyev
- Viktor Mineyev

Team

- Igor Novikov
- Albert Mokeyev
- Viktor Mineyev

== Rowing ==
The Soviet Union had 26 male rowers participate in seven rowing events in 1964.

Men's single sculls – 1st place ( gold medal)

- Vyacheslav Ivanov (Вячеслав Иванов)

Men's double sculls – 1st place ( gold medal)

- Oleg Tyurin (Олег Тюрин)
- Boris Dubrovskiy (Борис Дубровский)

Men's coxless pair

- Oleg Golovanov (Олег Голованов)
- Valentin Boreyko (Валентин Борейко)

Men's coxed pair – 4th place

- Nikolay Safronov (Николай Сафронов)
- Leonid Rakovshchik (Леонид Раковщик)
- Igor Rudakov (Игорь Рудаков)

Men's coxless four – 7th place

- Celestinas Jucys (Целестинас Юцис)
- Eugenijus Levickas (Еугениус Левицкас)
- Jonas Motiejūnas (Йонас Матеюнас)
- Anatoliy Sass (Анатолий Сасс)

Men's coxed four – 5th place

- Anatoliy Tkachuk (Anatoly Tkachuk, Анатолий Ткачук)
- Vitaly Kurdchenko (Виталий Курдченко)
- Boris Kuzmin (Борис Кузьмин)
- Vladimir Yevseyev (Владимир Евсеев)
- Anatoly Luzgin (Анатолий Лузгин)

Men's eight – 5th place

- Juozas Jagelavičius (Yozas Yagelavichyus, Йозас Ягелавичюс)
- Yury Suslin (Юрий Суслин)
- Petras Karla (Петрас Карла)
- Vytautas Briedis (Vitautas Briedis, Витаутас Бриедис)
- Volodymyr Sterlik (Vladimir Sterlik, Владимир Стерлик)
- Zigmas Jukna (Zigmas Yukna, Зигмас Юкна)
- Antanas Bagdonavičius (Antanas Bagdonavichyus, Антанас Багдонавичюс)
- Ričardas Vaitkevičius (Richardas Vaytkyavichyus, Ричардас Вайткявичус)
- Yury Lorentsson (Юрий Лоренцсон)

== Shooting ==
Ten shooters represented the Soviet Union in 1964. Shota Kveliashvili won a silver in the 300 m rifle, three positions and Pāvels Seničevs won a silver in the trap event.

25 m pistol

- Igor Bakalov
- Aleksandr Zabelin

50 m pistol

- Albert Udachin
- Yevgeny Rasskazov

300 m rifle, three positions

- Shota Kveliashvili
- Aleksandrs Gerasimjonoks

50 m rifle, three positions

- Viktor Shamburkin
- Vladimir Chuyan

50 m rifle, prone

- Vladimir Chuyan
- Viktor Shamburkin

Trap

- Pāvels Seničevs
- Sergey Kalinin

== Volleyball ==
Men's team competition

- Round robin

- Defeated Romania (3–0)
- Defeated Netherlands (3–0)
- Defeated South Korea (3–0)
- Defeated Hungary (3–0)
- Defeated Czechoslovakia (3–2)
- Lost to Japan (1–3)
- Defeated United States (3–0)
- Defeated Bulgaria (3–0)
- Defeated Brazil (3–0) → gold medal

- Team roster

- Ivan Bugaenkov
- Nikolai Burobin
- Yuri Chesnokov
- Vascha Kacharava
- Valery Kalatschikhin
- Vitaly Kovalenko
- Stanislav Ljugailo
- Georgy Mondzolevsky
- Yuri Poryarkov
- Eduard Sibiryakov
- Yuri Vengorovsky
- Dimitri Voskoboynikov

Women's team competition

- Round robin

- Defeated Romania (3–0)
- Defeated South Korea (3–0)
- Defeated Poland (3–0)
- Defeated United States (3–0)
- Lost to Japan (0–3) → silver medal

- Team roster

- Nelly Abramova
- Astra Biltauere
- Lyudmila Buldakova
- Lyudmila Gureyeva
- Valentina Kamenek
- Marita Katusheva
- Ninel Lukanina
- Valentina Mishak
- Tatyana Roshchina
- Inna Ryskal
- Antonina Ryzhova
- Tamara Tikhonina

== Medals by republic ==
In the following table for team events number of team representatives, who received medals are counted, not "one medal for all the team", as usual. Because there were people from different republics in one team.

Rank	Republic	Gold	Silver	Bronze	Total
1	Russian SFSR	37	27	28	92
2	Ukrainian SSR	15	8	8	31
3	Byelorussian SSR	3	4	2	9
4	Georgian SSR	2	4	5	11
5	Kazakh SSR	2	1	1	4
6	Latvian SSR	1	5	2	8
7	Turkmen SSR	1	0	0	1
8	Azerbaijan SSR	0	5	4	9
9	Estonian SSR	0	2	0	2
10	Uzbek SSR	0	1	1	2
11	Armenian SSR	0	1	0	1
11	Lithuanian SSR	0	1	0	1
11	Moldavian SSR	0	1	0	1
Totals (13 entries)		61	60	51	172
