= List of Soviet Athletics Championships winners =

The Soviet Athletics Championships (Russian: Чемпионат СССР по лёгкой атлетике) was an annual outdoor track and field competition organised by the Soviet Athletics Federation, which served as the Soviet national championship for the sport. The competition lasted from 1920 to 1991, being replaced by various national competitions in the post-Soviet states thereafter. It was part of the quadrennial athletics at the Spartakiad of the Peoples of the USSR from 1963 to 1991, though discrete Spartakiad and Soviet Championships were held in 1986. The winners of the event were almost exclusively Soviet nationals, though a limited number of foreign athletes did win the event following an open invitation at the 1979 and 1983 Spartakiads.

== Men ==
=== 100 metres ===
- 1960: Edvin Ozolin
- 1961: Edvin Ozolin
- 1962: Edvin Ozolin
- 1963: Edvin Ozolin
- 1964: Nikolay Politiko
- 1965: Nikolay Politiko
- 1966: Edvin Ozolin
- 1967: Vladislav Sapeya
- 1968: Vladislav Sapeya
- 1969: Valeriy Borzov
- 1970: Aleksandr Kornelyuk
- 1971: Valeriy Borzov
- 1972: Valeriy Borzov
- 1973: Aleksandr Kornelyuk
- 1974: Valeriy Borzov
- 1975: Valeriy Borzov
- 1976: Valeriy Borzov
- 1977: Valeriy Borzov
- 1978: Vladimir Ignatenko
- 1979: Silvio Leonard (CUB)
- 1980: Nikolay Sidorov
- 1981: Nikolay Sidorov
- 1982: Andrey Prokofyev
- 1983: Innocent Egbunike (NGR)
- 1984: Aleksandr Semonov
- 1985: Vladimir Muravyov
- 1986: Viktor Bryzhin
- 1987: Vladimir Muravyov
- 1988: Andrey Razin
- 1989: Igor Groshev
- 1990: Vladimir Krylov
- 1991: Vitaliy Savin

=== 200 metres ===
- 1960: Edvin Ozolin
- 1961: Edvin Ozolin
- 1962: Amin Tuyakov
- 1963: Edvin Ozolin
- 1964: Nikolay Politiko
- 1965: Amin Tuyakov
- 1966: Amin Tuyakov
- 1967: Amin Tuyakov
- 1968: Nikolay Ivanov
- 1969: Aleksandr Bratchikov
- 1970: Borys Savchuk
- 1971: Valeriy Borzov
- 1972: Valeriy Borzov
- 1973: Valeriy Borzov
- 1974: Valeriy Borzov
- 1975: Valeriy Borzov
- 1976: Aleksandr Aksinin
- 1977: Valeriy Borzov
- 1978: Vladimir Ignatenko
- 1979: Wardell Gilbreath (USA)
- 1980: Andrey Shlyapnikov
- 1981: Ivan Babenko
- 1982: Sergey Sokolov
- 1983: Vladimir Muravyov
- 1984: Mikhail Kulikov
- 1985: Aleksandr Yevgenyev
- 1986: Aleksandr Yevgenyev
- 1987: Besik Gotsiridze
- 1988: Vladimir Krylov
- 1989: Aleksandr Lysenko
- 1990: Mikhail Vdovin
- 1991: Aleksandr Goremykin

=== 400 metres ===
- 1960: Konstantin Grachev
- 1961: Vadym Arkhypchuk
- 1962: Vadym Arkhypchuk
- 1963: Vadym Arkhypchuk
- 1964: Viktor Bychkov
- 1965: Vadym Arkhypchuk
- 1966: Hryhoriy Sverbetov
- 1967: Borys Savchuk
- 1968: Borys Savchuk
- 1969: Aleksandr Bratchikov
- 1970: Borys Savchuk
- 1971: Aleksandr Bratchikov
- 1972: Semyon Kocher
- 1973: Viktor Nikonorov
- 1974: Vladimir Nosenko
- 1975: Pavel Kozban
- 1976: Valeriy Yurchenko
- 1977: Valeriy Yurchenko
- 1978: Vyacheslav Dozenko
- 1979: Stan Vinson (USA)
- 1980: Nikolay Chernetskiy
- 1981: Viktor Markin
- 1982: Aliaksandr Trashchyla
- 1983: Viktor Markin
- 1984: Vladimir Krylov
- 1985: Vladimir Krylov
- 1986: Aleksandr Kurochkin
- 1987: Aleksandr Kurochkin
- 1988: Aleksandr Kurochkin
- 1989: Vjaceslavs Kocerjagins
- 1990: Yevgeniy Lomtyev
- 1991: Dmitry Kliger

=== 800 metres ===
- 1960: Vasiliy Savinkov
- 1961: Vasiliy Savinkov
- 1962: Abram Kryvosheiev
- 1963: Valery Bulyshev
- 1964: Valery Bulyshev
- 1965: Vadim Mikhailov
- 1966: Vadim Mikhailov
- 1967: Sergey Kryuchok
- 1968: Rein Tölp
- 1969: Sergey Kryuchok
- 1970: Yevhen Arzhanov
- 1971: Yevhen Arzhanov
- 1972: Ivan Ivanov
- 1973: Yevhen Arzhanov
- 1974: Georgiy Chernishov
- 1975: Vladimir Ponomaryov
- 1976: Viktor Anokhin
- 1977: Vladimir Ponomaryov
- 1978: Nikolay Kirov
- 1979: Anatoliy Reshetnyak
- 1980: Aleksey Litvinov
- 1981: Viktor Tarasov
- 1982: Aleksey Litvinov
- 1983: Viktor Kalinkin
- 1984: Viktor Kalinkin
- 1985: Viktor Zemlyanskiy
- 1986: Viktor Zemlyanskiy
- 1987: Andrey Sudnik
- 1988: Andrey Sudnik
- 1989: Andrey Sudnik
- 1990: Andrey Sudnik
- 1991: Andrey Sudnik

=== 1500 metres ===
- 1960: Nikolay Marichev
- 1961: Valentin Karaulov
- 1962: Vasiliy Savinkov
- 1963: Vasiliy Savinkov
- 1964: Ivan Byelitskiy
- 1965: Oleg Rayko
- 1966: Mart Vilt
- 1967: Oleg Rayko
- 1968: Mikhail Zhelobovskiy
- 1969: Volodymyr Panteley
- 1970: Mikhail Zhelobovskiy
- 1971: Mikhail Zhelobovskiy
- 1972: Volodymyr Panteley
- 1973: Nikolay Andreyev
- 1974: Pyotr Anisim
- 1975: Aleksandr Andrushenko
- 1976: Anatoliy Mamontov
- 1977: Vladimir Ponomaryov
- 1978: Valeriy Abramov
- 1979: Vladimir Ponomaryov
- 1980: Dmitriy Dmitriyev
- 1981: Vitaliy Tyshchenko
- 1982: Nikolay Kirov
- 1983: Nikolay Kirov
- 1984: Viktor Kalinkin
- 1985: Igor Lotaryov
- 1986: Sergey Afanasyev
- 1987: Leonid Masunov
- 1988: Sergey Afanasyev
- 1989: Sergey Melnikov
- 1990: Vladimir Kolpakov
- 1991: Sergey Melnikov

=== 5000 metres ===
- 1960: Pyotr Bolotnikov
- 1961: Pyotr Bolotnikov
- 1962: Pyotr Bolotnikov
- 1963: Yuriy Tyurin
- 1964: Nikolay Dutov
- 1965: Leonid Ivanov
- 1966: Viktor Kudynskyy
- 1967: Gennadiy Khlistov
- 1968: Rashid Sharafetdinov
- 1969: Rashid Sharafetdinov
- 1970: Leonid Mykytenko
- 1971: Rashid Sharafetdinov
- 1972: Nikolay Puklakov
- 1973: Yuriy Aleksashin
- 1974: Mikhail Zhelobovskiy
- 1975: Ivan Parluy
- 1976: Valentin Zotov
- 1977: Anatoliy Nedybalyuk
- 1978: Aleksandr Fedotkin
- 1979: Miruts Yifter (ETH)
- 1980: Dmitriy Dmitriyev
- 1981: Dmitriy Dmitriyev
- 1982: Dmitriy Dmitriyev
- 1983: Dmitriy Dmitriyev
- 1984: Vitaliy Tyshchenko
- 1985: Gennadiy Temnikov
- 1986: Mikhail Dasko
- 1987: Vitaliy Tyshchenko
- 1988: Vitaliy Tyshchenko
- 1989: Mikhail Dasko
- 1990: Mikhail Dasko
- 1991: Mikhail Dasko

=== 10,000 metres ===
- 1960: Pyotr Bolotnikov
- 1961: Pyotr Bolotnikov
- 1962: Pyotr Bolotnikov
- 1963: Leonid Ivanov
- 1964: Pyotr Bolotnikov
- 1965: Leonid Ivanov
- 1966: Leonid Mykytenko
- 1967: Gennadiy Khlistov
- 1968: Leonid Mykytenko
- 1969: Nikolay Dutov
- 1970: Rashid Sharafetdinov
- 1971: Rashid Sharafetdinov
- 1972: Rashid Sharafetdinov
- 1973: Nikolay Sviridov
- 1974: Valentin Zotov
- 1975: Enn Sellik
- 1976: Enn Sellik
- 1977: Leonid Moseyev
- 1978: Anatoliy Badrankov
- 1979: Miruts Yifter (ETH)
- 1980: Valeriy Kriulin
- 1981: Ivan Parluy
- 1982: Ivan Parluy
- 1983: Berhanu Girma (ETH)
- 1984: Anatoliy Krakhmalyuk
- 1985: Andrey Kuznetsov
- 1986: Oleg Strizhakov
- 1987: Valeriy Abramov
- 1988: Sergey Smirnov
- 1989: Nikolay Chameyev
- 1990: Mikhail Dasko
- 1991: Mikhail Dasko

=== Marathon ===
- 1960: Konstantin Vorobyev
- 1961: Viktor Baykov
- 1962: Viktor Baykov
- 1963: Viktor Baykov
- 1964: Viktor Baykov
- 1965: Mikhail Gorolov
- 1966: Anatoliy Sukharkov
- 1967: Mikhail Gorolov
- 1968: Yuriy Volkov
- 1969: Anatoliy Skrypnik
- 1970: Yuriy Volkov
- 1971: Yuriy Velikorodnik
- 1972: Anatoliy Baranov
- 1973: Viktor Krause
- 1974: Yuriy Velikorodnik
- 1975: Grigoriy Vinyar
- 1976: Nikolay Penzin
- 1977: Viktor Zubov
- 1978: Yuriy Laptyev
- 1979: Leonid Moseyev
- 1980: Vladimir Kotov
- 1981: Anatoliy Aryukov
- 1982: Leonid Moseyev
- 1983: Yuriy Pleshkov
- 1984: Vladimir Nikityuk
- 1985: Pyotr Saltykov
- 1986: Igor Broslavskiy
- 1987: Ravil Kashapov
- 1988: Yakov Tolstikov
- 1989: Viktor Mozgovoy
- 1990: Aleksandr Vychuzhanin
- 1991: Vladimir Bukhanov

=== 3000 metres steeplechase ===
- 1960: Nikolay Sokolov
- 1961: Aleksey Konov
- 1962: Aleksey Konov
- 1963: Nikolay Sokolov
- 1964: Ivan Belyayev
- 1965: Viktor Kudynskyy
- 1966: Viktor Kudynskyy
- 1967: Viktor Kudynskyy
- 1968: Viktor Kudynskyy
- 1969: Vladimir Dudin
- 1970: Romualdas Bitė
- 1971: Pavel Sysoyev
- 1972: Romualdas Bitė
- 1973: Vladimir Dudin
- 1974: Sergey Skripka
- 1975: Vladimir Lisovskiy
- 1976: Vladimir Filonov
- 1977: Vladimir Lisovskiy
- 1978: Vladimir Filonov
- 1979: Henry Marsh (USA)
- 1980: Vladimir Filonov
- 1981: Aleksandr Velichko
- 1982: Aleksandr Velichko
- 1983: Sergey Yepishin
- 1984: Ivan Konovalov
- 1985: Ivan Konovalov
- 1986: Ivan Konovalov
- 1987: Ivan Danu
- 1988: Gatis Deksnis
- 1989: Valeriy Vandyak
- 1990: Ivan Konovalov
- 1991: Ivan Konovalov

=== 110 metres hurdles ===
- 1960: Anatoly Mikhaylov
- 1961: Anatoly Mikhaylov
- 1962: Anatoly Mikhaylov
- 1963: Anatoly Mikhaylov
- 1964: Anatoly Mikhaylov
- 1965: Anatoly Mikhaylov
- 1966: Anatoly Mikhaylov
- 1967: Viktor Balikhin
- 1968: Oleg Stepanenko
- 1969: Viktor Balikhin
- 1970: Viktor Balikhin
- 1971: Anatoliy Moshiashvili
- 1972: Viktor Myasnikov
- 1973: Anatoliy Moshiashvili
- 1974: Viktor Myasnikov
- 1975: Viktor Myasnikov
- 1976: Viktor Myasnikov
- 1977: Eduard Pereverzev
- 1978: Andrey Prokofyev
- 1979: Aleksandr Puchkov
- 1980: Aleksandr Puchkov
- 1981: Yuriy Chervanyov
- 1982: Andrey Prokofyev
- 1983: Andrey Prokofyev
- 1984: Igors Kazanovs
- 1985: Sergey Usov
- 1986: Andrey Prokofyev
- 1987: Igors Kazanovs
- 1988: Vladimir Shishkin
- 1989: Vladimir Shishkin
- 1990: Igors Kazanovs
- 1991: Vladimir Shishkin

=== 200 metres hurdles ===
- 1960: ?
- 1961: Anatoly Mikhaylov
- 1962: ?
- 1963: Edvin Ozolin
- 1964: Vasyl Anisimov
- 1965: Vyacheslav Skomorokhov
- 1966: Vasyl Anisimov
- 1967: Edvin Ozolin
- 1968: ?
- 1969: Vyacheslav Skomorokhov
- 1970: Anatoliy Kazakov

=== 400 metres hurdles ===
- 1960: Igor Ilyin
- 1961: Vasyl Anisimov
- 1962: Vasyl Anisimov
- 1963: Vasyl Anisimov
- 1964: Vasyl Anisimov
- 1965: Vasyl Anisimov
- 1966: Edvīns Zāģeris
- 1967: Edvīns Zāģeris
- 1968: Vyacheslav Skomorokhov
- 1969: Vyacheslav Skomorokhov
- 1970: Vyacheslav Skomorokhov
- 1971: Vyacheslav Skomorokhov
- 1972: Yevgeniy Gavrilenko
- 1973: Dmitry Stukalov
- 1974: Yevgeniy Gavrilenko
- 1975: Yevgeniy Gavrilenko
- 1976: Yevgeniy Gavrilenko
- 1977: Vasyl Arkhypenko
- 1978: Vasyl Arkhypenko
- 1979: Vasyl Arkhypenko
- 1980: Vasyl Arkhypenko
- 1981: Vasyl Arkhypenko
- 1982: Aleksandr Yatsevich
- 1983: Aleksandr Kharlov
- 1984: Vladimir Budko
- 1985: Aleksandr Vasilyev
- 1986: Aleksandr Vasilyev
- 1987: Aleksandr Vasilyev
- 1988: Aleksandr Vasilyev
- 1989: Vladimir Budko
- 1990: Aleksey Bazarov
- 1991: Vladimir Budko

=== High jump ===
- 1960: Viktor Bolshov
- 1961: Valeriy Brumel
- 1962: Valeriy Brumel
- 1963: Valeriy Brumel
- 1964: Robert Shavlakadze
- 1965: Andrey Khmarskiy
- 1966: Valeriy Skvortsov
- 1967: Valentin Gavrilov
- 1968: Valeriy Skvortsov
- 1969: Valentin Gavrilov
- 1970: Sergey Budalov
- 1971: Rustam Akhmetov
- 1972: Kęstutis Šapka
- 1973: Sergey Budalov
- 1974: Kęstutis Šapka
- 1975: Aleksandr Grigoryev
- 1976: Sergey Budalov
- 1977: Aleksandr Grigoryev
- 1978: Aleksandr Grigoryev
- 1979: Aleksandr Grigoryev
- 1980: Raimondas Kazlauskas
- 1981: Aleksandr Grigoryev
- 1982: Oleksiy Demyanyuk
- 1983: Valeriy Sereda
- 1984: Viktor Malchugin
- 1985: Igor Paklin
- 1986: Valeriy Sereda
- 1987: Hennadiy Avdyeyenko
- 1988: Hennadiy Avdyeyenko
- 1989: Rudolf Povarnitsyn
- 1990: Aleksey Yemelin
- 1991: Igor Paklin

=== Pole vault ===
- 1960: Jânis Krasovskis
- 1961: Ihor Petrenko
- 1962: Ihor Petrenko
- 1963: Hennadiy Bleznitsov
- 1964: Hennadiy Bleznitsov
- 1965: Hennadiy Bleznitsov
- 1966: Hennadiy Bleznitsov
- 1967: Igor Feld
- 1968: Hennadiy Bleznitsov
- 1969: Yury Isakov
- 1970: Hennadiy Bleznitsov
- 1971: Yevgeniy Tananika
- 1972: Hennadiy Bleznitsov
- 1973: Yury Isakov
- 1974: Vladimir Kishkun
- 1975: Vladimir Kishkun
- 1976: Vladimir Trofimenko
- 1977: Vladimir Kishkun
- 1978: Yevgeniy Tananika
- 1979: Konstantin Volkov
- 1980: Aleksandr Chernyayev
- 1981: Viktor Spasov
- 1982: Viktor Spasov
- 1983: Vladimir Polyakov
- 1984: Sergey Bubka
- 1985: Vasiliy Bubka
- 1986: Radion Gataullin
- 1987: Aleksandrs Obižajevs
- 1988: Grigoriy Yegorov
- 1989: Radion Gataullin
- 1990: Grigoriy Yegorov
- 1991: Radion Gataullin

=== Long jump ===
- 1960: Igor Ter-Ovanesyan
- 1961: Dmytro Bondarenko
- 1962: Igor Ter-Ovanesyan
- 1963: Igor Ter-Ovanesyan
- 1964: Igor Ter-Ovanesyan
- 1965: Igor Ter-Ovanesyan
- 1966: Igor Ter-Ovanesyan
- 1967: Igor Ter-Ovanesyan
- 1968: Igor Ter-Ovanesyan
- 1969: Igor Ter-Ovanesyan
- 1970: Vladimir Skibenko
- 1971: Igor Ter-Ovanesyan
- 1972: Leonid Barkovskyy
- 1973: Valeriy Pidluzhnyy
- 1974: Valeriy Pidluzhnyy
- 1975: Valeriy Pidluzhnyy
- 1976: Valeriy Pidluzhnyy
- 1977: Valeriy Pidluzhnyy
- 1978: Vladimir Tsepelyov
- 1979: Frank Paschek (GDR)
- 1980: Shamil Abbyasov
- 1981: Viktor Belskiy
- 1982: Viktor Belskiy
- 1983: Oganes Stepanyan
- 1984: Sergey Layevskiy
- 1985: Sergey Layevskiy
- 1986: Sergey Layevskiy
- 1987: Sergey Layevskiy
- 1988: Leonid Voloshin
- 1989: Vladimir Ratushkov
- 1990: Andrey Ignatov
- 1991: Dmitry Bagryanov

=== Triple jump ===
- 1960: Vitold Kreyer
- 1961: Vitold Kreyer
- 1962: Vladimir Goryaev
- 1963: Vladimir Goryaev
- 1964: Viktor Kravchenko
- 1965: Aleksandr Lazarenko
- 1966: Viktor Kravchenko
- 1967: Nikolay Dudkin
- 1968: Viktor Saneyev
- 1969: Viktor Saneyev
- 1970: Viktor Saneyev
- 1971: Viktor Saneyev
- 1972: Mikhail Bariban
- 1973: Viktor Saneyev
- 1974: Viktor Saneyev
- 1975: Viktor Saneyev
- 1976: Valentyn Shevchenko
- 1977: Anatoliy Piskulin
- 1978: Viktor Saneyev
- 1979: Gennadiy Valyukevich
- 1980: Vasiliy Grishchenkov
- 1981: Aleksey Roganin
- 1982: Gennadiy Valyukevich
- 1983: Vasiliy Grishchenkov
- 1984: Gennadiy Valyukevich
- 1985: Oleg Protsenko
- 1986: Oleg Protsenko
- 1987: Aleksandr Kovalenko
- 1988: Aleksandr Kovalenko
- 1989: Volodymyr Inozemtsev
- 1990: Volodymyr Inozemtsev
- 1991: Leonid Voloshin

=== Shot put ===
- 1960: Viktor Lipsnis
- 1961: Viktor Lipsnis
- 1962: Viktor Lipsnis
- 1963: Adolfas Varanauskas
- 1964: Nikolay Karasyov
- 1965: Nikolay Karasyov
- 1966: Nikolay Karasyov
- 1967: Nikolay Karasyov
- 1968: Eduard Gushchin
- 1969: Nikolay Karasyov
- 1970: Eduard Gushchin
- 1971: Valeriy Voykin
- 1972: Aleksandr Baryshnikov
- 1973: Aleksandr Baryshnikov
- 1974: Aleksandr Baryshnikov
- 1975: Valeriy Voykin
- 1976: Yevgeniy Mironov
- 1977: Valeriy Voykin
- 1978: Aleksandr Baryshnikov
- 1979: Valeriy Voykin
- 1980: Anatoliy Yarosh
- 1981: Yevgeniy Mironov
- 1982: Vladimir Kiselyov
- 1983: Jānis Bojārs
- 1984: Vladimir Kiselyov
- 1985: Sergey Smirnov
- 1986: Sergey Smirnov
- 1987: Sergey Smirnov
- 1988: Sergey Gavryushin
- 1989: Oleksandr Bagach
- 1990: Vyacheslav Lykho
- 1991: Aleksandr Klimenko

=== Discus throw ===
- 1960: Algimantas Baltusnikas
- 1961: Algimantas Baltusnikas
- 1962: Vladimir Trusenyov
- 1963: Kim Bukhantsov
- 1964: Vladimir Trusenyov
- 1965: Vladimir Trusenyov
- 1966: Vladimir Trusenyov
- 1967: Vitautas Jaras
- 1968: Vyacheslav Svyetailo
- 1969: Vladimir Lyakhov
- 1970: Vladimir Lyakhov
- 1971: Vladimir Lyakhov
- 1972: Vladimir Lyakhov
- 1973: Viktor Zhurba
- 1974: Vello Kuusemäe
- 1975: Nikolay Vikhor
- 1976: Vladimir Lyakhov
- 1977: Nikolay Vikhor
- 1978: Ihor Duhinets
- 1979: John Powell (USA)
- 1980: Yuriy Dumchev
- 1981: Yuriy Dumchev
- 1982: Ihor Duhinets
- 1983: Georgiy Kolnootchenko
- 1984: Dmitry Kovtsun
- 1985: Georgiy Kolnootchenko
- 1986: Romas Ubartas
- 1987: Volodymyr Zinchenko
- 1988: Yuriy Dumchev
- 1989: Vyacheslav Demakov
- 1990: Sergey Lyakhov
- 1991: Dmitriy Shevchenko

=== Hammer throw ===
- 1960: Vasily Rudenkov
- 1961: Vasily Rudenkov
- 1962: Aleksey Baltovskiy
- 1963: Gennadiy Kondrashov
- 1964: Yuriy Bakarinov
- 1965: Gennadiy Kondrashov
- 1966: Romuald Klim
- 1967: Romuald Klim
- 1968: Romuald Klim
- 1969: Anatoliy Bondarchuk
- 1970: Anatoliy Bondarchuk
- 1971: Romuald Klim
- 1972: Anatoliy Bondarchuk
- 1973: Anatoliy Bondarchuk
- 1974: Valentin Dmitrenko
- 1975: Valentin Dmitrenko
- 1976: Yuriy Sedykh
- 1977: Aleksandr Kozlov
- 1978: Yuriy Sedykh
- 1979: Sergey Litvinov
- 1980: Yuriy Sedykh
- 1981: Igor Nikulin
- 1982: Igor Nikulin
- 1983: Sergey Litvinov
- 1984: Igor Nikulin
- 1985: Igor Grigorash
- 1986: Benjaminas Viluckis
- 1987: Jüri Tamm
- 1988: Jüri Tamm
- 1989: Igor Astapkovich
- 1990: Igor Astapkovich
- 1991: Andrey Abduvaliyev

=== Javelin throw ===
- 1960: Mart Paama
- 1961: Vladimir Kuznetsov
- 1962: Jānis Lūsis
- 1963: Jānis Lūsis
- 1964: Jānis Lūsis
- 1965: Jānis Lūsis
- 1966: Jānis Lūsis
- 1967: Mart Paama
- 1968: Jānis Lūsis
- 1969: Jānis Lūsis
- 1970: Jānis Lūsis
- 1971: Jānis Lūsis
- 1972: Jānis Lūsis
- 1973: Jānis Lūsis
- 1974: Aleksandr Makarov
- 1975: Nikolay Grebnyev
- 1976: Jānis Lūsis
- 1977: Nikolay Grebnyev
- 1978: Aleksandr Zaytsev
- 1979: Detlef Michel (GDR)
- 1980: Vasiliy Yershov
- 1981: Dainis Kûla
- 1982: Dainis Kûla
- 1983: Dainis Kûla
- 1984: Viktor Yevsyukov
- 1985: Sergey Gavras
- 1986: Marek Kaleta
- 1987: Viktor Yevsyukov
- 1988: Viktor Yevsyukov
- 1989: Viktor Yevsyukov
- 1990: Viktor Zaytsev
- 1991: Vladimir Sasimovich

=== Decathlon ===
- 1960: Vasili Kuznetsov
- 1961: Yuriy Kutyenko
- 1962: Vasili Kuznetsov
- 1963: Vasili Kuznetsov
- 1964: Mykhaylo Storozhenko
- 1965: Yuriy Dyachkov
- 1966: Yuriy Dyachkov
- 1967: Rein Aun
- 1968: Rein Aun
- 1969: Vladimir Shcherbatykh
- 1970: Leonid Lytvynenko
- 1971: Leonid Lytvynenko
- 1972: Mykola Avilov
- 1973: Vladimir Shcherbatykh
- 1974: Rudolf Sigert
- 1975: Mykola Avilov
- 1976: Mykola Avilov
- 1977: Aleksandr Grebenyuk
- 1978: Aleksandr Grebenyuk
- 1979: Aleksandr Grebenyuk
- 1980: Yuriy Kutsenko
- 1981: Aleksandr Nevskiy
- 1982: Konstantin Akhapkin
- 1983: Grigoriy Degtyaryov
- 1984: Grigoriy Degtyaryov
- 1985: Sergey Popov
- 1986: Grigoriy Degtyaryov
- 1987: Valter Külvet
- 1988: Oleksandr Apaychev
- 1989: Mikhail Medved
- 1990: Mikhail Medved
- 1991: Viktor Radchenko

=== 20 kilometres walk ===
- 1960: Volodymyr Holubnychy
- 1961: ?
- 1962: Anatoly Vedyakov
- 1963: Boris Khrolovich
- 1964: Volodymyr Holubnychy
- 1965: Volodymyr Holubnychy
- 1966: Anatoly Vedyakov
- 1967: Veniamin Soldatenko
- 1968: Volodymyr Holubnychy
- 1969: Gennadiy Agapov & Nikolay Smaga
- 1970: Nikolay Smaga
- 1971: Nikolay Smaga
- 1972: Volodymyr Holubnychy
- 1973: Vladimir Rezayev
- 1974: Volodymyr Holubnychy
- 1975: Otto Barch
- 1976: Viktor Semyonov
- 1977: Anatoliy Solomin
- 1978: Viktor Semyonov
- 1979: Mykola Vynnychenko
- 1980: Mykola Vynnychenko
- 1981: Anatoliy Solomin
- 1982: Pyotr Pochynchuk
- 1983: Mykola Vynnychenko
- 1984: Nikolay Polozov
- 1985: Viktor Mostovik
- 1986: Valdas Kazlauskas
- 1987: Vyacheslav Ivanenko
- 1988: Mikhail Shchennikov
- 1989: Vladimir Andreyev
- 1990: Andrey Perlov
- 1991: Yevgeniy Misyulya

=== 50 kilometres walk ===
The 1980 edition of the men's 50 kilometres walk was held over a short course. Times were invalid for the distance, but the winner still stands.

- 1962: Grigory Klimov
- 1963: Anatoly Vedyakov
- 1964: Yevgeniy Lyungin
- 1965: Gennadiy Agapov
- 1966: ?
- 1967: Gennadiy Agapov
- 1968: Sergey Grigoryev
- 1969: Veniamin Soldatenko
- 1970: Veniamin Soldatenko
- 1971: Veniamin Soldatenko
- 1972: Veniamin Soldatenko
- 1973: Otto Barch
- 1974: Sergey Bondarenko
- 1975: Veniamin Soldatenko
- 1976: Veniamin Soldatenko
- 1977: Alvidas Baltaduonis
- 1978: Otto Barch
- 1979: Viktor Dorovskikh
- 1980: Yevgeniy Ivchenko
- 1981: Vitaliy Grodovchuk
- 1982: Viktor Dorovskikh
- 1983: Sergey Yung
- 1984: Andrey Perlov
- 1985: Andrey Perlov
- 1986: Valeriy Suntsov
- 1987: ?
- 1988: Vyacheslav Ivanenko
- 1989: Andrey Perlov
- 1990: Aleksandr Potashov
- 1991: Vitaliy Popovich

== Women ==
=== 100 metres ===
- 1960: Maria Itkina
- 1961: Maria Itkina
- 1962: Maria Itkina
- 1963: Maria Itkina
- 1964: Galina Popova
- 1965: Galina Mitrokhina
- 1966: Vera Popkova
- 1967: Vera Popkova
- 1968: Lyudmila Samotyosova
- 1969: Galina Mitrokhina
- 1970: Galina Bukharina
- 1971: Nadezhda Besfamilnaya
- 1972: Nadezhda Besfamilnaya
- 1973: Nadezhda Besfamilnaya
- 1974: Marina Sidorova
- 1975: Lyudmila Maslakova
- 1976: Lyudmila Maslakova
- 1977: Lyudmila Maslakova
- 1978: Lyudmila Storozhkova
- 1979: Lyudmila Kondratyeva
- 1980: Vera Komisova
- 1981: Natalya Bochina
- 1982: Lyudmila Kondratyeva
- 1983: Nadezhda Georgieva (BUL)
- 1984: Natalya Pomoshchnikova-Voronova & Irina Slyusar
- 1985: Marina Zhirova
- 1986: Irina Slyusar
- 1987: Marina Molokova
- 1988: Marina Zhirova
- 1989: Irina Privalova
- 1990: Irina Privalova
- 1991: Galina Malchugina

=== 200 metres ===
- 1960: Maria Itkina
- 1961: Maria Itkina
- 1962: Maria Itkina
- 1963: Galina Popova
- 1964: Lyudmila Samotyosova
- 1965: Vera Popkova
- 1966: Vera Popkova
- 1967: Lyudmila Samotyosova
- 1968: Lyudmila Samotyosova
- 1969: Nadezhda Besfamilnaya
- 1970: Tatyana Kondrashova
- 1971: Nadezhda Besfamilnaya
- 1972: Nadezhda Besfamilnaya
- 1973: Marina Sidorova
- 1974: Marina Sidorova
- 1975: Nadezhda Besfamilnaya
- 1976: Tatyana Prorochenko
- 1977: Marina Sidorova
- 1978: Lyudmila Maslakova
- 1979: Lyudmila Kondratyeva
- 1980: Lyudmila Maslakova
- 1981: Natalya Bochina
- 1982: Raisa Makhova
- 1983: Irina Olkhovnikova
- 1984: Yelena Vinogradova
- 1985: Elvira Barbashina
- 1986: Marina Molokova
- 1987: Natalya German
- 1988: Lyudmila Kondratyeva
- 1989: Tatyana Papilina
- 1990: Oksana Stepicheva
- 1991: Yelena Vinogradova

=== 400 metres ===
- 1960: Maria Itkina
- 1961: Yekaterina Parlyuk
- 1962: Yekaterina Parlyuk
- 1963: Maria Itkina
- 1964: Maria Itkina
- 1965: Maria Itkina
- 1966: Lyudmila Samotyosova
- 1967: Lyudmila Samotyosova
- 1968: Natalya Pechonkina
- 1969: Taisiya Kovalevskaya
- 1970: Vera Popkova
- 1971: Natalya Pechonkina
- 1972: Natalya Pechonkina
- 1973: Nadezhda Ilyina
- 1974: Nadezhda Ilyina
- 1975: Nadezhda Ilyina
- 1976: Lyudmila Aksyonova
- 1977: Marina Sidorova
- 1978: Mariya Pinigina
- 1979: Mariya Pinigina
- 1980: Tatyana Prorochenko
- 1981: Larisa Krylova
- 1982: Irina Baskakova
- 1983: Mariya Pinigina
- 1984: Olha Bryzhina
- 1985: Olha Bryzhina
- 1986: Mariya Pinigina
- 1987: Olga Nazarova
- 1988: Olga Nazarova
- 1989: Marina Shmonina
- 1990: Lyudmyla Dzhyhalova
- 1991: Olha Bryzhina

=== 800 metres ===
- 1960: Yekaterina Parlyuk
- 1961: Lyudmila Shevtsova
- 1962: Lyudmila Lysenko
- 1963: Vera Mukhanova
- 1964: Laine Erik
- 1965: Tamara Dmitriyeva
- 1966: Alla Krivoshchekova
- 1967: Laine Erik
- 1968: Laine Erik
- 1969: Alla Kolesnikova
- 1970: Tamara Pangelova
- 1971: Raisa Ruus
- 1972: Nijolė Sabaitė
- 1973: Nijolė Sabaitė
- 1974: Nina Morgunova
- 1975: Nina Morgunova
- 1976: Valentina Gerasimova
- 1977: Svetlana Styrkina
- 1978: Tatyana Providokhina
- 1979: Yekaterina Podkopayeva
- 1980: Lyudmila Veselkova
- 1981: Lyudmila Veselkova
- 1982: Olga Mineyeva
- 1983: Irina Podyalovskaya
- 1984: Yekaterina Podkopayeva
- 1985: Ravilya Agletdinova
- 1986: Lyubov Kiryukhina-Tsyoma
- 1987: Lyubov Gurina
- 1988: Nadezhda Olizarenko
- 1989: Dalia Matuseviciené
- 1990: Nadezhda Loboyko
- 1991: Svetlana Masterkova

=== 1500 metres ===
- 1967: Tamara Dunaiskaya
- 1968: Lyudmila Bragina
- 1969: Lyudmila Bragina
- 1970: Lyudmila Bragina
- 1971: Tamara Pangelova
- 1972: Lyudmila Bragina
- 1973: Lyudmila Bragina
- 1974: Lyudmila Bragina
- 1975: Tatyana Kazankina
- 1976: Tatyana Kazankina
- 1977: Tatyana Kazankina
- 1978: Olga Dvirna
- 1979: Natalia Mărășescu (ROM)
- 1980: Lyudmila Veselkova
- 1981: Lyudmila Veselkova
- 1982: Olga Dvirna
- 1983: Zamira Zaytseva
- 1984: Nadezhda Ralldugina
- 1985: Ravilya Agletdinova
- 1986: Tetyana Dorovskikh
- 1987: Tetyana Dorovskikh
- 1988: Laimuté Baikauskaité
- 1989: Yekaterina Podkopayeva
- 1990: Lyudmila Rogachova
- 1991: Tetyana Dorovskikh

=== 3000 metres ===
- 1972: Nina Taborskaya
- 1973: Lyudmila Bragina
- 1974: Lyudmila Bragina
- 1975: Raisa Smekhnova
- 1976: Giana Romanova
- 1977: Irina Bondarchuk
- 1978: Svetlana Ulmasova
- 1979: Svetlana Ulmasova
- 1980: Tatyana Pozdnyakova
- 1981: Nina Yapeyeva
- 1982: Svetlana Ulmasova
- 1983: Natalya Artyomova
- 1984: Galina Zakharova
- 1985: Olga Bondarenko
- 1986: Regina Chistyakova
- 1987: Olga Bondarenko
- 1988: Natalya Artyomova
- 1989: Tatyana Pozdnyakova
- 1990: Ravilya Agletdinova
- 1991: Lyudmila Borisova

=== 5000 metres ===
- 1980: Irina Bondarchuk
- 1981: Yelena Sipatova
- 1982: Irina Bondarchuk
- 1983: Not held
- 1984: Not held
- 1985: Olga Bondarenko
- 1986: Svetlana Ulmasova
- 1987: Not held
- 1988: Yekaterina Khramenkova
- 1989: Tatyana Pozdnyakova

=== 10,000 metres ===
- 1981: Yelena Sipatova
- 1982: Anna Domoradskaya
- 1983: Raisa Sadreydinova
- 1984: Olga Bondarenko
- 1985: Olga Bondarenko
- 1986: Svetlana Guskova
- 1987: Olga Bondarenko
- 1988: Lyudmila Matveyeva
- 1989: Natalya Sorokivskaya
- 1990: Yelena Tolstoguzova
- 1991: Tatyana Pozdnyakova

=== Marathon ===
- 1980: Lyubov Putilova
- 1981: Zoya Ivanova
- 1982: Zoya Ivanova
- 1983: Zoya Ivanova
- 1984: Zoya Ivanova
- 1985: Raisa Smekhnova
- 1986: Nadezhda Gumerova
- 1987: Yekaterina Khramenkova
- 1988: Tatyana Polovinskaya
- 1989: Lyubov Klochko
- 1990: Ramila Burangulova
- 1991: Madina Biktagirova

=== 2000 metres steeplechase ===
- 1988: Marina Pluzhnikova
- 1989: Irina Mozharova
- 1990: Svetlana Rogova
- 1991: Not held

=== 80 metres hurdles ===
- 1960: Irina Press
- 1961: Irina Press
- 1962: Rimma Koshelyova
- 1963: Niliya Kulkova
- 1964: Irina Press
- 1965: Irina Press
- 1966: Irina Press
- 1967: Liudmila Ievleva
- 1968: Tatyana Talysheva

=== 100 metres hurdles ===
- 1962: Liliya Makoshina
- 1963: Niliya Kulkova
- 1964: Tatyana Ilyina
- 1965: Valentyna Bolshova
- 1966: Valentyna Bolshova
- 1967: Valentyna Bolshova
- 1968: Galina Kuznetsova
- 1969: Liya Khitrina
- 1970: Tatyana Kondrashova
- 1971: Lyubov Nikitenko
- 1972: Tatyana Anisimova & Liya Khitrina
- 1973: Lyubov Nikitenko
- 1974: Natalya Lebedeva
- 1975: Natalya Lebedeva
- 1976: Tatyana Anisimova
- 1977: Lyubov Nikitenko
- 1978: Tatyana Anisimova
- 1979: Tatyana Anisimova
- 1980: Vera Komisova
- 1981: Maria Kemenchezhi
- 1982: Maria Merchuk
- 1983: Yordanka Donkova (BUL)
- 1984: Maria Merchuk
- 1985: Vera Akimova
- 1986: Vera Akimova
- 1987: Eva Sokolova
- 1988: Nataliya Grygoryeva
- 1989: Lidiya Yurkova
- 1990: Nataliya Grygoryeva
- 1991: Ludmila Engquist

=== 200 metres hurdles ===
- 1967: Valentyna Bolshova
- 1968: ?
- 1969: Galina Mitrokhina
- 1970: Mariya Nikiforova
- 1971: ?
- 1972: ?
- 1973: Rosa Babich

=== 400 metres hurdles ===
- 1976: Tatyana Zelentsova
- 1977: Tatyana Storosheva
- 1978: Tatyana Zelentsova
- 1979: Marina Stepanova
- 1980: Yekaterina Fesenko
- 1981: Natalya Ziruk
- 1982: Yelena Filipishina
- 1983: Ana Ambrazienė
- 1984: Yelena Filipishina
- 1985: Marina Stepanova
- 1986: Marina Stepanova
- 1987: Ana Ambrazienė
- 1988: Tatyana Ledovskaya
- 1989: Tatyana Ledovskaya
- 1990: Tatyana Ledovskaya
- 1991: Anna Knoroz

=== High jump ===
- 1960: Galina Dolya
- 1961: Valentina Ballod
- 1962: Galina Yevsyukova
- 1963: Taisia Chenchik
- 1964: Galina Kostyenko
- 1965: Galina Kostyenko
- 1966: Lyudmila Komleva
- 1967: Antonina Lazareva
- 1968: Antonina Lazareva
- 1969: Nina Bryntseva
- 1970: Antonina Lazareva
- 1971: Vera Gavrilova
- 1972: Antonina Lazareva
- 1973: Antonina Lazareva
- 1974: Tamara Galka
- 1975: Alla Fedorchuk
- 1976: Tatyana Shlachto
- 1977: Tatyana Boyko
- 1978: Svetlana Ivanchenko
- 1979: Yelena Goloborodko
- 1980: Tamara Bykova
- 1981: Valentina Poluiko
- 1982: Tamara Bykova
- 1983: Tamara Bykova
- 1984: Olga Turchak
- 1985: Tamara Bykova
- 1986: Olga Turchak
- 1987: Liudmyla Avdieienko
- 1988: Yelena Gulyayeva
- 1989: Tamara Bykova
- 1990: Yelena Yelesina
- 1991: Yelena Gulyayeva

=== Long jump ===
- 1960: Liudmyla Radchenko
- 1961: Tatyana Shchelkanova
- 1962: Tatyana Shchelkanova
- 1963: Tatyana Shchelkanova
- 1964: Tatyana Shchelkanova
- 1965: Tatyana Shchelkanova
- 1966: Tatyana Shchelkanova
- 1967: Tatyana Talysheva
- 1968: Tatyana Talysheva
- 1969: Valentina Sokolova
- 1970: Alla Smirnova
- 1971: Tatyana Kotsar
- 1972: Lyubov Ilyina
- 1973: Kapitolina Lotova
- 1974: Lidiya Alfeyeva
- 1975: Lidiya Alfeyeva
- 1976: Lidiya Alfeyeva
- 1977: Olga Rukavishnikova
- 1978: Vilma Bardauskienė
- 1979: Anita Stukāne
- 1980: Tetyana Skachko
- 1981: Margarita Butkiené
- 1982: Svetlana Zorina
- 1983: Svetlana Zorina
- 1984: Olena Khlopotnova
- 1985: Olena Khlopotnova
- 1986: Yelena Belevskaya
- 1987: Yelena Belevskaya
- 1988: Inessa Kravets
- 1989: Larysa Berezhna
- 1990: Inessa Kravets
- 1991: Yelena Sinchukova

=== Triple jump ===
- 1990: Irina Babakova
- 1991: Inessa Kravets

=== Shot put ===
- 1960: Tamara Press
- 1961: Tamara Press
- 1962: Tamara Press
- 1963: Tamara Press
- 1964: Tamara Press
- 1965: Tamara Press
- 1966: Tamara Press
- 1967: Nadezhda Chizhova
- 1968: Nadezhda Chizhova
- 1969: Nadezhda Chizhova
- 1970: Nadezhda Chizhova
- 1971: Antonina Ivanova
- 1972: Nadezhda Chizhova
- 1973: Esfir Dolzhenko
- 1974: Nadezhda Chizhova
- 1975: Svetlana Krachevskaya
- 1976: Svetlana Krachevskaya
- 1977: Svetlana Krachevskaya
- 1978: Svetlana Krachevskaya
- 1979: Ilona Slupianek (GDR)
- 1980: Svetlana Krachevskaya
- 1981: Natalya Lisovskaya
- 1982: Nunu Abashydze
- 1983: Natalya Lisovskaya
- 1984: Nunu Abashydze
- 1985: Natalya Lisovskaya
- 1986: Natalya Lisovskaya
- 1987: Marina Antonyuk
- 1988: Natalya Lisovskaya
- 1989: Natalya Lisovskaya
- 1990: Natalya Lisovskaya
- 1991: Svetlana Krivelyova

=== Discus throw ===
- 1960: Tamara Press
- 1961: Tamara Press
- 1962: Tamara Press
- 1963: Tamara Press
- 1964: Tamara Press
- 1965: Tamara Press
- 1966: Tamara Press
- 1967: Lyudmila Muravyova
- 1968: Lyudmila Muravyova
- 1969: Lyudmila Muravyova
- 1970: Faina Melnik
- 1971: Tamara Danilova
- 1972: Faina Melnik
- 1973: Faina Melnik
- 1974: Faina Melnik
- 1975: Faina Melnik
- 1976: Faina Melnik
- 1977: Faina Melnik
- 1978: Natalya Gorbachova
- 1979: Svetlana Melnikova
- 1980: Faina Melnik
- 1981: Faina Melnik
- 1982: Tatyana Lesovaya
- 1983: Galina Murašova
- 1984: Galina Savinkova
- 1985: Lyubov Zverkova
- 1986: Ellina Zvereva
- 1987: Anne Khorina
- 1988: Galina Murašova
- 1989: Olga Chernyavskaya
- 1990: Olga Chernyavskaya
- 1991: Larisa Mikhalchenko

=== Hammer throw ===
- 1990: Larisa Shtyrogrizhnaya
- 1991: Not held

=== Javelin throw ===
- 1960: Birutė Kalėdienė
- 1961: Elvīra Ozoliņa
- 1962: Elvīra Ozoliņa
- 1963: Yelena Gorchakova
- 1964: Elvīra Ozoliņa
- 1965: Yelena Gorchakova
- 1966: Elvīra Ozoliņa
- 1967: Mariya Moskalenko
- 1968: Lidiya Tsymosh
- 1969: Vera Savenkova
- 1970: Marite Saulite
- 1971: Nina Marakina
- 1972: Nina Marakina
- 1973: Elvîra Lûsis
- 1974: Tatyana Zhigalova
- 1975: Leolita Blodniece
- 1976: Svetlana Babich
- 1977: Nadezhda Yakubovich
- 1978: Saida Gunba
- 1979: Saida Gunba
- 1980: Leolita Blodniece
- 1981: Sandra Leiskalne
- 1982: Galina Isayeva
- 1983: Leolita Blodniece
- 1984: Zinaida Gavrilina
- 1985: Natalya Yermolovich
- 1986: Natalya Yermolovich
- 1987: Natalya Yermolovich
- 1988: Irina Kostyuchenkova
- 1989: Natalya Yermolovich
- 1990: Natalya Shikolenko
- 1991: Natalya Shikolenko

=== Pentathlon ===
- 1960: Irina Press
- 1961: Irina Press
- 1962: Lidiya Shmakova
- 1963: Tatyana Shchelkanova
- 1964: Irina Press
- 1965: Irina Press
- 1966: Irina Press
- 1967: Valentina Tikhomirova
- 1968: Galina Sofina
- 1969: Valentina Tikhomirova
- 1970: Valentina Tikhomirova
- 1971: Valentina Tikhomirova
- 1972: Valentina Tikhomirova
- 1973: Nadiya Tkachenko
- 1974: Nadiya Tkachenko
- 1975: Nadiya Tkachenko
- 1976: Lyudmila Popovskaya
- 1977: Yekaterina Smirnova
- 1978: Nadiya Tkachenko
- 1979: Yekaterina Smirnova

=== Heptathlon ===
- 1980: Olga Kuragina
- 1981: Yekaterina Gordiyenko
- 1982: Natalya Gracheva
- 1983: Ramona Neubert (GDR)
- 1984: Natalya Shubenkova
- 1985: Natalya Shubenkova
- 1986: Natalya Shubenkova
- 1987: Larisa Turchinskaya
- 1988: Remigija Sablovskaité
- 1989: Larisa Turchinskaya
- 1990: Svetlana Drobasko
- 1991: Viktoriya Babiy

=== 5000 metres walk ===
- 1981: Aleksandra Grigoryeva
- 1982: Lyudmila Khrushcheva

=== 10 kilometres walk ===
- 1983: Natalya Serbinenko
- 1984: Olga Krishtop
- 1985: Vera Osipova
- 1986: Olga Krishtop
- 1987: Yelena Nikolayeva
- 1988: Yelena Nikolayeva
- 1989: Vera Makolova
- 1990: Nadezhda Ryashkina
- 1991: Alina Ivanova
