= Athletics at the 1965 Summer Universiade – Women's 800 metres =

The women's 800 metres event at the 1965 Summer Universiade was held at the People's Stadium in Budapest on 27 and 29 August 1965.

== Medalists ==
Gold	Silver	Bronze
Laine Erik; Soviet Union	Antje Gleichfeldt; West Germany	Abby Hoffman; Canada

== Results ==
=== Heats ===
Rank	Heat	Athlete	Nationality	Time	Notes
1	1	Abby Hoffman	Canada	2:09.1	Q
2	1	Laine Erik	Soviet Union	2:09.6	Q
3	1	Olga Kazi	Hungary	2:10.6	Q
4	1	Pat Brown	Great Britain	2:11.0	Q
5	1	Jutta von Haase	West Germany	2:13.1	
6	1	Jarmila Popelková	Czechoslovakia	2:14.0	
7	1	Ika Maričić	Yugoslavia	2:14.1	
8	1	Maria Habas	Poland	2:14.4	
1	2	Marie Ingrová	Czechoslovakia	2:11.3	Q
2	2	Antje Gleichfeldt	West Germany	2:11.5	Q
3	2	Sára Szenteleki	Hungary	2:12.0	Q
4	2	Mary Speedman-Campbell	Great Britain	2:13.2	Q
5	2	Yvonne Herisson	France	2:13.9	
6	2	Wanda Witter	Poland	2:16.0	

=== Final ===
Rank	Name	Nationality	Time	Notes
1st place, gold medalist(s)	Laine Erik	Soviet Union	2:06.2	
2nd place, silver medalist(s)	Antje Gleichfeldt	West Germany	2:06.6	
3rd place, bronze medalist(s)	Abby Hoffman	Canada	2:07.8	
4	Pat Brown	Great Britain	2:08.0	
5	Sára Szenteleki	Hungary	2:08.1	
6	Marie Ingrová	Czechoslovakia	2:09.2	
7	Olga Kazi	Hungary	2:10.6	
8	Mary Speedman-Campbell	Great Britain	2:13.0	
