= Athletics at the 1964 Summer Olympics – Men's 5000 metres =

Men's 5000 metres at the Games of the XVIII Olympiad
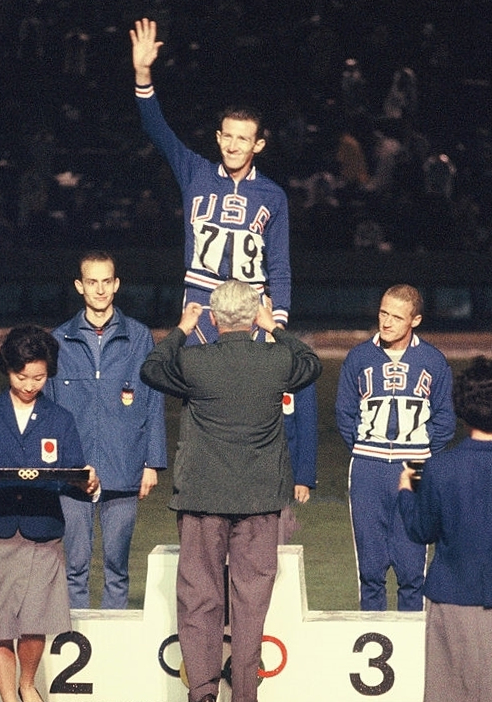
- Harald Norpoth, Bob Schul and Bill Dellinger on the podium
- Venue: Olympic Stadium
- Dates: 16–18 October 1964
- Competitors: 54 from 35 nations
- Winning time: 13:48.8

Medalists
1st place, gold medalist(s)		Bob Schul	United States
2nd place, silver medalist(s)		Harald Norpoth	United Team of Germany
3rd place, bronze medalist(s)		Bill Dellinger	United States

The men's 5000 metres was the second-longest of the seven men's track races in the Athletics at the 1964 Summer Olympics program in Tokyo. It was held on 16 October and 18 October 1964. 54 athletes from 35 nations entered, with 6 not starting the first round. The first round was held on 16 October and the final on 18 October.

The world record holder Vladimir Kuts had retired five years earlier. Defending champion Murray Halberg didn't make the final. Halberg and Pyotr Bolotnikov had dominated the event the previous four years but neither was in the final. The top runner of the year was Bob Schul from the Compton Invitational. This was Kip Keino's first Olympic final, but he would gain fame four years later.

In the slow, strategic race held in a light rain on a muddy dirt track Michel Jazy was more of a 1500 meter runner and expected to be ready for a fast finish. He kept himself in the lead or close to the lead throughout. Schul found himself on the curb boxed in by a loping Keino who seemed to be marking the field on the outside of the pack that also included future world record holder Ron Clarke. With 600 metres to go Bill Dellinger made the first move coming around the entire pack and into the lead. At age 30, old for an amateur athlete in this era, Dellinger came out of retirement to make one last attempt after failing to make the Olympic final the previous two Olympiads. Dellinger's move was marked by Jazy as the pace quickened. Nikolay Dutov came around the entire pack to challenge Jazy and Dellinger. Shortly after the bell, Jazy decided to take off, jumping to the lead with Harald Norpoth coming from mid pack to become his closest pursuer 5 metres back as the field stretched out. A one speed runner, Clarke had no answer for the speedsters. With 300 to go, Schul came from fifth place to start picking off runners to get to Norpoth with 200 to go. Through the turn he passed Norpoth with Jazy constantly looking over his shoulder to check his pursuer. Jazy still had a two metres lead as they reached the final straight. But that lead disappeared rapidly as Schul sprinted by to take the gold medal. Jazy now watched Norpoth as he slowly edged by just before the finish. Given all he could, Jazy tried to maintain and glide across the finish line, but Dellinger, in full sprint, caught Jazy at the line to take the bronze medal. It took officials a half an hour to decide the bronze medalist.

Schul's victory was the first and only American victory in the event.

== Results ==
=== First round ===
The top three runners in each of the 4 heats advanced.

==== First round, heat 1 ====
Place	Athlete	Nation	Time
1	Michel Jazy	France	13:55.4
2	Bill Baillie	New Zealand	13:55.4
3	Stepan Baidiuk	Soviet Union	14:00.2
4	Andrei Barabas	Romania	14:00.2
5	Anthony Cook	Australia	14:02.4
6	John Bryan Herring	Great Britain	14:07.2
7	Muharrem Dalkilic	Turkey	14:12.0
8	Lutz Philipp	United Team of Germany	14:15.2
9	Bruce Kidd	Canada	14:21.8
10	Janos Pinter	Hungary	14:41.0
11	Jean Randrianjatovo	Madagascar	15:50.4
—	Pascal Mfyomi	Tanzania	DNS
—	Gaston Roelants	Belgium	DNS

==== First round, heat 2 ====
Place	Athlete	Nation	Time
1	Michael Edwin Wiggs	Great Britain	13:51.0
2	Bill Dellinger	United States	13:52.2
3	Thor Helland	Norway	13:52.4
4	Lech Boguszewicz	Poland	13:52.8
5	Kęstutis Orentas	Soviet Union	13:54.0
6	Eugene Allonsius	Belgium	13:55.0
7	Jean Vaillant	France	14:05.8
8	Manfred Letzerich	United Team of Germany	14:06.2
9	Thomas O'Riordan	Ireland	14:08.8
10	Jørgen Dam	Denmark	14:20.4
11	Albert George Thomas	Australia	14:27.8
12	Fernando Aguilar	Spain	14:29.2
13	Alvaro Mejia Florez	Colombia	14:41.4
—	Ebrahim Yazdanpanah	Iran	DNS

==== First round, heat 3 ====
Place	Athlete	Nation	Time
1	Mohammed Gammoudi	Tunisia	14:10.2
2	Bob Schul	United States	14:11.4
3	Harald Norpoth	United Team of Germany	14:11.6
4	Murray Halberg	New Zealand	14:12.0
5	Josef Tomáš	Czechoslovakia	14:12.6
6	Bengt Najde	Sweden	14:13.4
7	Franc Červan	Yugoslavia	14:16.6
8	Simo Sakari Saloranta	Finland	14:24.6
9	Lajos Mecser	Hungary	14:35.4
10	Jean Fayolle	France	14:44.6
11	Somsak Keaokanta	Thailand	16:08.8
12	Ranatunge Karunananda	Ceylon	16:22.2
13	Nguyen Van Ly	Vietnam	17:28.0

==== First round, heat 4 ====
Place	Athlete	Nation	Time
1	Ron Clarke	Australia	13:48.4
2	Kipchoge Keino	Kenya	13:49.6
3	Nikolay Dutov	Soviet Union	13:50.6
4	Francisco Aritmendi	Spain	14:05.0
5	Sven-Olov Larsson	Sweden	14:10.2
6	Satsuo Iwashita	Japan	14:18.4
7	Derek Graham	Great Britain	14:21.6
8	Oscar Moore	United States	14:24.0
9	Simo Vazic	Yugoslavia	14:33.8
10	Henri Clerckx	Belgium	14:40.0
11	Neville Ian Scott	New Zealand	15:01.0
—	Ben Assou El Ghazi	Morocco	DNS
—	Manuel Oliveira	Portugal	DNS
—	Mamo Wolde	Ethiopia	DNS

=== Final ===
Place	Athlete	Nation	Time	1000	2000	3000	4000
1	Bob Schul	United States	13:48.8	2:51.4	5:40.0	8:25.0	11:16.2
2	Harald Norpoth	United Team of Germany	13:49.6	2:51.0	5:39.8	8:22.8	11:15.8
3	Bill Dellinger	United States	13:49.8	2:51.8	5:40.6	8:25.8	11:16.4
4	Michel Jazy	France	13:49.8	2:50.4	5:39.6	8:22.4	11:15.6
5	Kipchoge Keino	Kenya	13:50.4	2:50.8	5:40.4	8:25.6	11:16.0
6	Bill Baillie	New Zealand	13:51.0	2:50.6	5:39.8	8:24.2	11:16.0
7	Nikolay Dutov	Soviet Union	13:53.8	2:51.6	5:40.4	8:23.2	11:15.8
8	Thor Helland	Norway	13:57.0	2:51.6	5:40.2	8:26.0	11:16.6
9	Ron Clarke	Australia	13:58.0	2:50.2	5:39.4	8:22.2	11:15.8
10	Stepan Baidiuk	Soviet Union	14:11.2	2:51.0	5:40.0	8:25.6	11:19.2
11	Michael Edwin Wiggs	Great Britain	14:20.8	2:52.8	5:40.8	8:28.6	11:28.6
—	Mohammed Gammoudi	Tunisia	Did not start	-			
