= Valery Kliger =

Soviet volleyball player and coach

Valery Aryevich Kliger
Personal information
- Nationality: USSR

Sport
- Sport: Volleyball
- Club: CSKA Moscow

Valery Aryevich Kliger (Russian: Валерий Арьевич Клигер; born December 4, 1938) is a former Soviet volleyball player and coach, International Master of Sports, and Honored coach of the USSR (1978).

He played as a hitter for the Spartak volleyball team and CSKA Moscow (1960). With CSKA he won the USSR championships six times (1960–1966). He was a Silver medalist of the Games of the peoples of the USSR in 1967, and the winner of the CEV Champions League in 1960 and 1962.

In 1968, he began coaching the men's volleyball team CSKA Moscow, winners of the USSR championship in 1971 and 1984. He also coached the men's team in Moscow, who won a silver medal in the Games of the Peoples of the USSR in 1975, and were the champions of the Games of the Peoples of the USSR in 1979.

He then coached the CSKA Moscow women's volleyball team from 1984 to 1986. In 1984 the team won the USSR Cup; in 1985 they won the USSR championship; and in 1986 the European Cup. Kliger also coached the Women's Youth Team of the USSR, who won the European championship in 1986 and 1988.

Kliger's wife is well-known Soviet volleyball player Tamara Tikhonina.
