= John Herring =

John Herring may refer to:

- John Herring (athlete), British athlete
- John Frederick Herring Sr., English painter, sign maker and coachman
- John Frederick Herring Jr., his son, English painter
- John Mack Herring, who killed Betty Williams in a 1960s homicide case, see Kiss and Kill
