= Zenji (given name) =

- Gender: Male

Origin
- Origin: Japanese
- Meaning: Different meanings depending on the kanji used

Zenji is a masculine Japanese name.

== Orthography and meaning ==
The given name Zenji is written with various combinations of two kanji, the first read zen and the second ji (including cases where the kanji is originally read as si or chi but becomes ji due to the rendaku rule of Japanese phonology). The zen used in all the names listed below (善) means "goodness".

Separately, Zenji (禅師) is a title for Zen masters, placed after their mononymous dharma name. In such cases (for example, Dōgen Zenji), it is neither a given name nor surname.

== People ==
- Iwamoto Zenji (厳本 善治; 1863 – 1942), Japanese advocate of women's education
- Zenji Okuzawa (奥沢 善二; born 1937), Japanese middle-distance runner

== Fictional characters ==
- Zenji Marui (丸井 善二), a character from Food Wars!: Shokugeki no Soma
- Zenji Kotodama (殊玉 善治), a character from the supernatural mobile game Tokyo Debunker
