= Gureyev =

Gureyev or Gureev (Russian: Гуреев) is a Russian-language surname.The feminine form of this name is Gureyeva or Gureeva (Russian: Гуреева).

Notable people who share this surname include:

- Lyudmila Gureyeva (1943–2017),Soviet volleyball player
- Zhanna Gureyeva (born 1970),Belarusian triple jumper
