= Naroditsky (surname) =

Naroditsky is a Slavic surname. Notable people with the surname include:

- Daniel Naroditsky (1995–2025), American chess grandmaster
- David Naroditsky (1923–1999), Soviet sculptor
- Lazar Naroditsky (1937–2000), Ukrainian middle-distance runner
