= Ernie Pomfret =

British athlete (1941–2001)

Personal information
- Nationality: British (English)
- Born: 18 April 1941 Haswell, England
- Died: 1 May 2001 (aged 60) Sunderland, England
- Height: 174 cm (5 ft 9 in)
- Weight: 64 kg (141 lb)

Sport
- Sport: Athletics
- Events: Middle-distance running Steeplechase
- Club: Houghton Harriers

Ernest Pomfret (18 April 1941 – 1 May 2001) was a British middle-distance runner who competed at the 1964 Summer Olympics.

== Biography ==
Pomfret was born in Haswell, County Durham, England, and was a member of the Houghton Harriers of Sunderland.

Pomfret finished third behind Maurice Herriott in the steeplechase event at the 1962 AAA Championships.

At the 1964 Olympic Games in Tokyo, he represented Great Britain in the men's 3000 metres steeplechase.

He also represented England in the 3,000 metres steeplechase, at the 1966 British Empire and Commonwealth Games in Kingston, Jamaica.

Maurice Herriott would be the nemesis of Pomfret at the AAA Championships because in addition to his 1962 third place behind Herriott, Pomfret would finish runner-up to him in five consecutive steeplechase title finals from 1963 to 1967.
