= Athletics at the 1964 Summer Olympics – Men's 3000 metres steeplechase =

Men's 3000 metres steeplechase at the Games of the XVIII Olympiad
- Venue: Olympic Stadium
- Dates: 15–17 October 1964
- Competitors: 30 from 19 nations
- Winning time: 8:30.8 OR

Medalists
| 1st place, gold medalist(s) | | Gaston Roelants | Belgium |
| 2nd place, silver medalist(s) | | Maurice Herriott | Great Britain |
| 3rd place, bronze medalist(s) | | Ivan Belyayev | Soviet Union |

The men's 3000 metres steeplechase was the only steeplechase on the Athletics at the 1964 Summer Olympics program in Tokyo. It was held on 15 October and 17 October 1964. 30 athletes from 19 nations entered, with 1 not starting in the first round. The first round was held on 15 October and the final on 17 October.

New Olympic records for the event were set in two of the three heats as well as in the final, for a total of three out of four races resulting in a new record.

== Results ==
=== First round ===
The top three runners in each of the 3 heats as well as the fastest remaining runner advanced.

==== First round, heat 1 ====
| Place | Athlete | Nation | Time |
|---|---|---|---|
| 1 | Manuel Oliveira | Portugal | 8:40.8 |
| 2 | Ivan Belyayev | Soviet Union | 8:42.0 |
| 3 | Ben Assou El Ghazi | Morocco | 8:42.8 |
| 4 | Vic Zwolak | United States | 8:43.6 |
| 5 | Zenji Okuzawa | Japan | 8:50.0 |
| 6 | Slavko Špan | Yugoslavia | 8:57.6 |
| 7 | József Mácsár | Hungary | 9:08.8 |
| 8 | Dieter Hartmann | United Team of Germany | 9:09.2 |
| 9 | Jean Toffey Ekonian | Ivory Coast | 9:47.4 |
| — | Bengt Perssoon | Sweden | Did not start |

==== First round, heat 2 ====
| Place | Athlete | Nation | Time |
|---|---|---|---|
| 1 | Maurice Herriott | Great Britain | 8:33.0 OR |
| 2 | Lars-Erik Gustafsson | Sweden | 8:34.2 |
| 3 | George L. Young | United States | 8:34.2 |
| 4 | Guy Texereau | France | 8:34.6 |
| 5 | Lazar Naroditsky | Soviet Union | 8:43.0 |
| 6 | Alfred Döring | United Team of Germany | 8:43.2 |
| 7 | Taketsugu Saruwatari | Japan | 8:46.6 |
| 8 | Edward Szklarczyk | Poland | 8:48.0 |
| 9 | Labidi Ayachi | Tunisia | 9:02.0 |
| 10 | Cahit Onel | Turkey | 9:15.6 |

==== First round, heat 3 ====
| Place | Athlete | Nation | Time |
|---|---|---|---|
| 1 | Adolfas Aleksejūnas | Soviet Union | 8:31.8 OR |
| 2 | Gaston Roelants | Belgium | 8:33.8 |
| 3 | Ernie Pomfret | Great Britain | 8:45.2 |
| 4 | Jeffrey Fishback | United States | 8:50.2 |
| 5 | Benjamin Kogo | Kenya | 8:51.0 |
| 6 | Rainer Dörner | United Team of Germany | 8:55.0 |
| 7 | Attila Simon | Hungary | 8:57.8 |
| 8 | Trevor Vincent | Australia | 8:58.8 |
| 9 | Saburo Yokomizo | Japan | 9:04.6 |
| 10 | Dilbagh Singh Kler | Malaysia | 9:18.8 |

=== Final ===
Alexeiunas could not match his record-setting pace from the heats, falling to 7th in the final. Herriott, who had set the record Alexeiunas had broken, improved on his own time but could not reach Alexeiunas's record as he placed second. Roelants, the world record-holder who had run behind Alexeiunas in the heat, turned out victorious in the final, breaking the Soviet's record by a full second to set a third new record in the event.

| Place | Athlete | Nation | Time |
|---|---|---|---|
| 1 | Gaston Roelants | Belgium | 8:30.8 OR |
| 2 | Maurice Herriott | Great Britain | 8:32.4 |
| 3 | Ivan Belyayev | Soviet Union | 8:33.8 |
| 4 | Manuel Oliveira | Portugal | 8:36.2 |
| 5 | George L. Young | United States | 8:38.2 |
| 6 | Guy Texereau | France | 8:38.6 |
| 7 | Adolf Alexeiunas | Soviet Union | 8:39.0 |
| 8 | Lars-Erik Gustafsson | Sweden | 8:41.8 |
| 9 | Ben Assou El Ghazi | Morocco | 8:43.6 |
| 10 | Ernie Pomfret | Great Britain | 8:43.8 |
