= Lars-Erik Gustafsson =

Swedish steeplechase runner

Personal information
- Nationality: Swedish
- Born: 17 August 1938
- Died: 26 December 2014 (aged 76)

Sport
- Sport: athletics
- Event: Steeplechase

Lars-Erik Gustafsson (17 August 1938 – 26 December 2014) was a Swedish steeplechase runner. He competed in the men's 3000 metres steeplechase at the 1964 Summer Olympics.
