= Jean Toffey Ekonian =

Ivorian middle-distance runner

Personal information
- Full name: Jean Toffey Ekonian
- Nationality: Ivorian
- Born: 1935
- Died: 3 October 2012 (aged 76–77)

Sport
- Sport: Middle-distance running
- Event: Steeplechase

Jean Toffey Ekonian (1935 – 3 October 2012) was an Ivorian middle-distance runner. As a steeplechaser, he would compete at the 1964 Summer Olympics and would represent Ivory Coast for their first appearance at an Olympic Games. He would be the first and only Ivorian athlete to compete in the 3000 metres steeplechase at an Olympic Games. Before the 1964 Summer Games, he would set a personal best in the event in 1962.

In the first round of the men's 3000 metres steeplechase, Eekonian placed last in his round.

== Biography ==
Jean Toffey Ekonian was born in 1935. He would set a personal best in the men's 3000 metres steeplechase with a time of 9:30.0 in 1962.

Ekonian would represent Ivory Coast at the 1964 Summer Olympics in Tokyo, Japan, with the nation making its debut at an Olympic Games. He would be one of the first Olympians for the country and would be the first and only Ivorian athlete to compete in the 3000 metres steeplechase at an Olympic Games.

He would compete in the first round of the men's 3000 metres steeplechase at the Japan National Stadium. He would compete in the first heat against eight other athletes in the round on 15 October. There, he would finish with a time of 9:47.4 in the distance and would place last in his round. He would not qualify for the finals of the event. The eventual winner of the event was Gaston Roelants of Belgium who recorded an Olympic record-setting time of 8:30.8.

Ekonian later died on 3 October 2012 in Ivory Coast.
