= Särevere =

Borough in Järva County, Estonia

Coordinates: 58°47′N 25°26′E

- Small borough
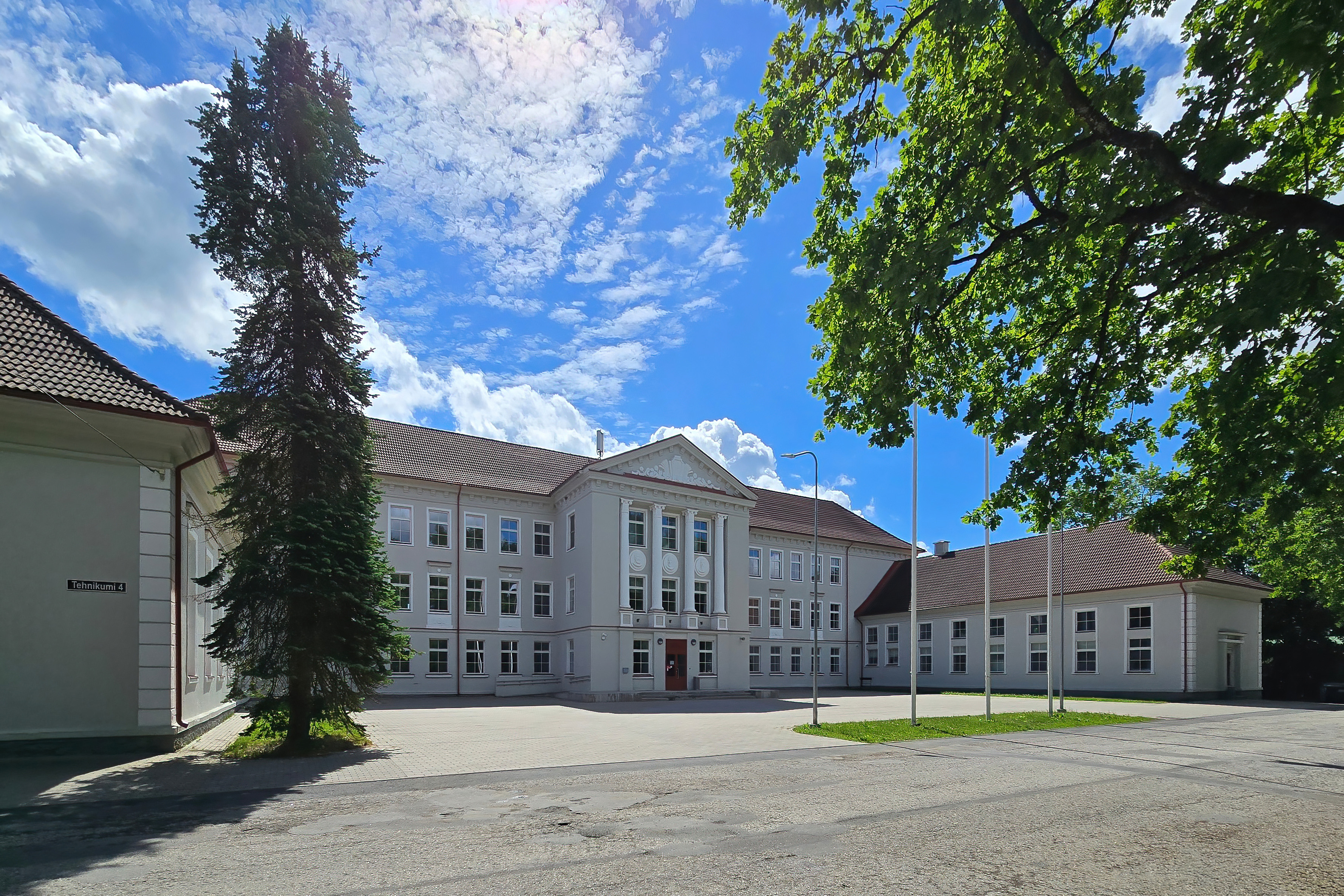
- Järvamaa college building in Särevere
- Interactive map of Särevere
- Country: Estonia
- County: Järva County
- Parish: Türi Parish
- Time zone: UTC+2 (EET)
  - Summer (DST): UTC+3 (EEST)

Särevere (German: Serrefer) is a small borough in Türi Parish, Järva County in central Estonia.

Middle distance runner Laine Erik (born 1942) was born in Särevere.

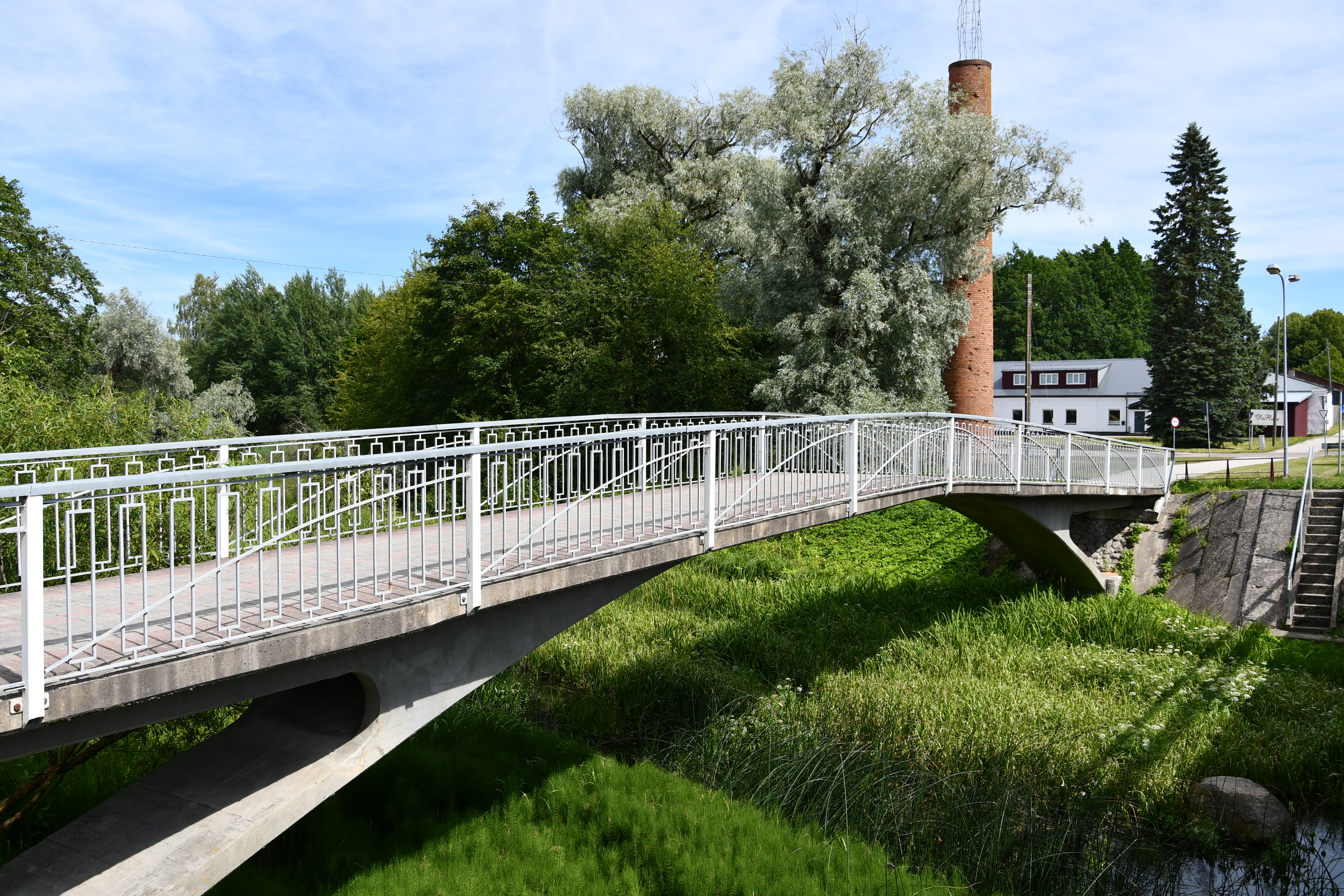

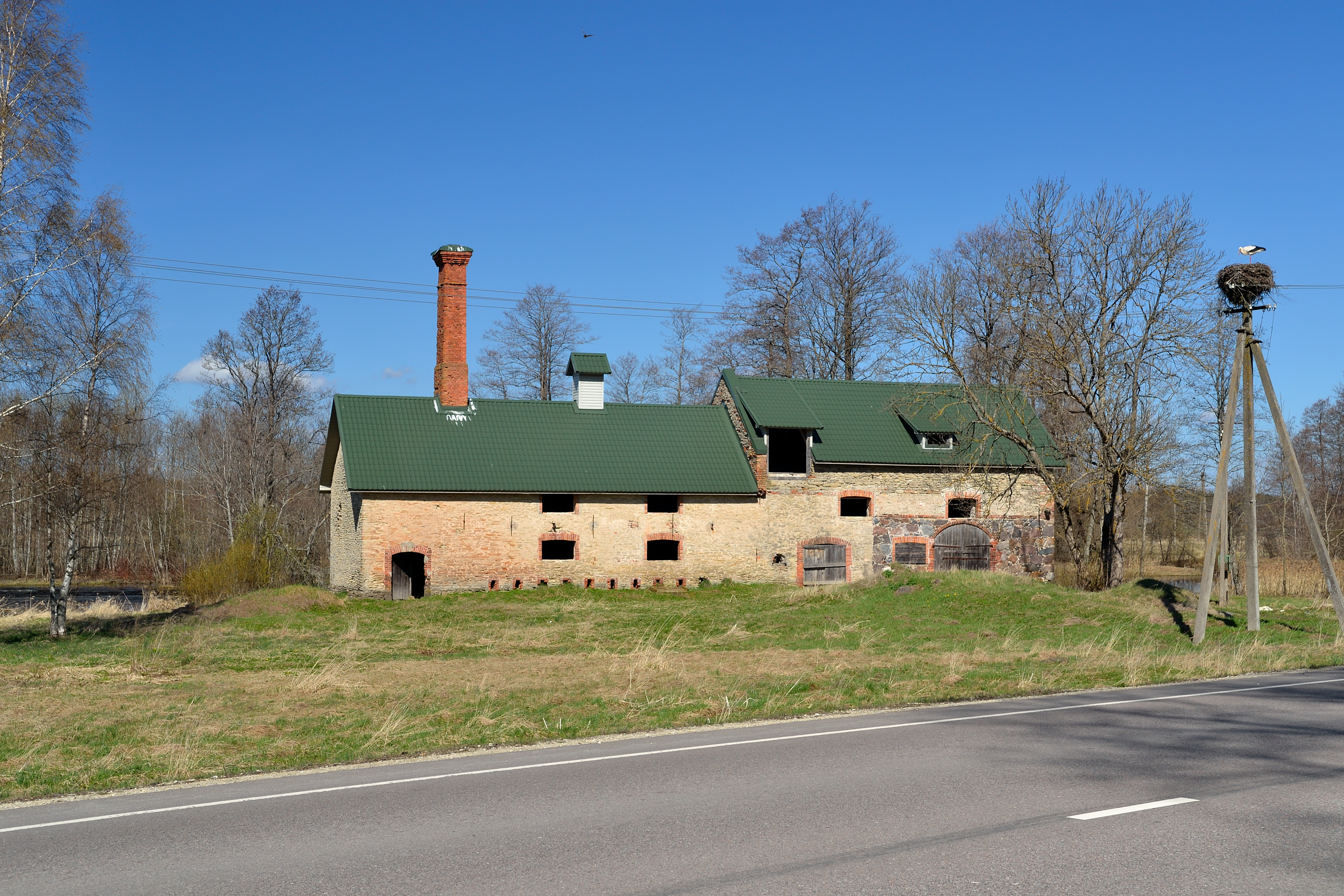

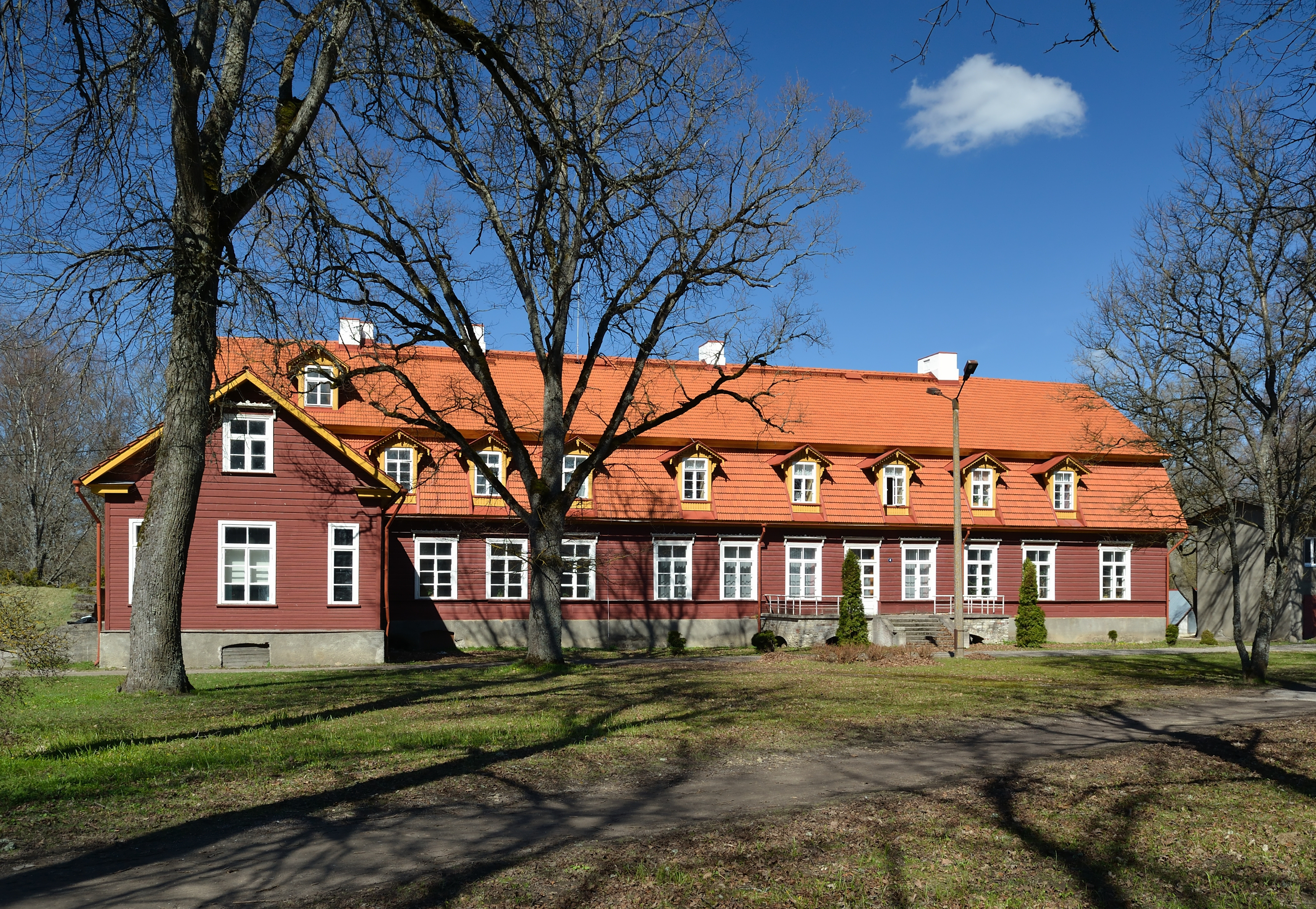
