= Alfred Döring =

German middle-distance runner

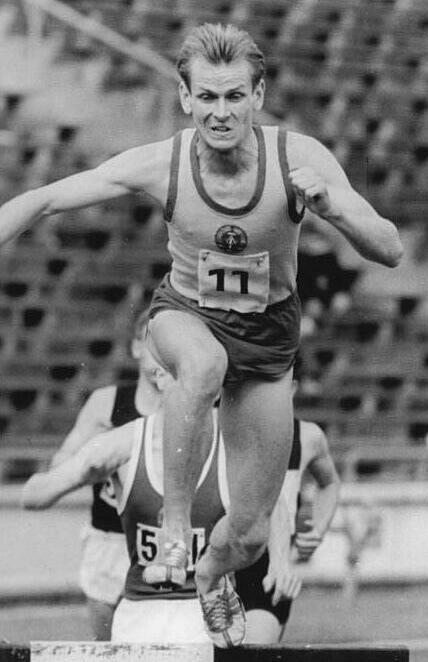
- Döring in 1960

Personal information
- Nationality: German
- Born: 7 February 1933 (age 93) Költschen, Germany

Sport
- Sport: Middle-distance running
- Event: Steeplechase

Alfred Döring (born 7 February 1933) is a German former middle-distance runner. He competed in the men's 3000 metres steeplechase at the 1964 Summer Olympics.
