= Vladimir Ignatenko (sprinter) =

Soviet-Ukrainian sprinter

Personal information
- Born: Володимир Володимирович Ігнатенко; 17 April 1955 (age 71) Nizhyn, Ukrainian SSR

Sport
- Country: Soviet Union
- Sport: Athletics
- Event: 100 metres

Achievements and titles
- National finals: 2 Soviet titles (1978)
- Personal best(s): 100 m: 10.31 (1978); 200 m: 20.74 (1978)
Medal record
Men's athletics
Representing Soviet Union
European Championships
Bronze medal – third place	1978 Prague	100 m
Bronze medal – third place	1978 Prague	4×100 m relay
Summer Universiade
Gold medal – first place	1977 Sofia	4x100 m relay

Vladimir Vladimirovich Ignatenko (Ukrainian: Володимир Володимирович Ігнатенко; born 17 April 1955) is a Ukrainian former Soviet sprinter who competed in the 100 metres. At the 1978 European Athletics Championships he was the bronze medallist in the 100 m and a member of the bronze medal-winning Soviet 4 × 100 metres relay team, alongside Sergey Vladimirtsev, Nikolay Kolesnikov and Aleksandr Aksinin. Ignatenko won a relay gold medal with Kolesnikov, Aksinin and Juris Silovs at the 1977 Universiade. He also represented his country in the relay at the 1979 IAAF World Cup.

He was a two-time national champion at the Soviet Athletics Championships, completing a 100/200 m double in 1978.

He was born in Nizhyn, Ukrainian SSR, to Vladimir and Halyna Ignatenko, a military officer and primary school teacher respectively. He took up a variety of sports in his youth, including football, cycling and cross-country skiing. He enrolled in the Soviet Army and it was there that his sprint speed was noticed, and his superiors passed him to the army sports team for training. An injury at the end of the 1978 season curtailed his career.

== International competitions ==
Representing the Soviet Union
Year	Competition	Venue	Position	Event	Result	Notes
1977	Universiade	Sofia, Bulgaria	1st	4 × 100 m relay	38.75	
1978	European Indoor Championships	Milan, Italy	10th (sf)	60 m	6.79	5th in heat 2
1978	European Championships	Prague, Czechoslovakia	3rd	100 m	10.37	
1978	European Championships	Prague, Czechoslovakia	5th (sf)	200 m	20.74	5th fastest in semis
1978	European Championships	Prague, Czechoslovakia	3rd	4 × 100 m relay	38.82	
1979	World Cup	Montreal, Canada	6th	4 × 100 m relay	39.52	

== National titles ==
- Soviet Athletics Championships
  - 100 m: 1978
  - 200 m: 1978

== See also ==
- List of Soviet Athletics Championships winners
- List of international medallists in men's 100 metres
- List of European Athletics Championships medalists (men)
