= Oscar Moore (athlete) =

American long-distance runner

Personal information
- Full name: Oscar W. Moore Jr.
- Nationality: American
- Born: March 31, 1938 (age 88)

Sport
- Sport: Long-distance running
- Event: 5000 metres

Oscar W. Moore Jr. (born March 31, 1938) is an American long-distance runner. He competed in the men's 5000 metres at the 1964 Summer Olympics.

After four years in the United States Marines, Moore competed for the Southern Illinois Salukis track and field team in the NCAA where he was a six-time All-American. He later became an assistant professor in health and exercise and founded the Rowan Profs track and field team, which he coached until 2003.
