= Jørgen Dam =

Danish long-distance runner (born 1941)

Personal information
- Full name: Jørgen Nielsen Dam
- Nationality: Danish
- Born: 30 October 1941 (age 84)

Sport
- Sport: Long-distance running
- Event: 5000 metres

Jørgen Nielsen Dam (born 30 October 1941) is a Danish long-distance runner. He competed in the men's 5000 metres at the 1964 Summer Olympics.
