= Sermsak Keocanta =

Thai long-distance runner

Personal information
- Nationality: Thai
- Born: 23 July 1939 (age 86)

Sport
- Sport: Long-distance running
- Event: 5000 metres

Sermsak Keocanta (Thai: เสริมศักดิ์ แก้วกันทา, previously Somsak Keaokanta; born 23 July 1939) is a Thai police officer, politician and long-distance runner. He competed in the 1964 Summer Olympics.

Sermsak attended the Royal Police Cadet Academy in Sam Phran, where he took up long-distance running. He was selected for the national team for the 1964 Summer Olympics in Tokyo, and was a torchbearer for the torch relay through Bangkok. He competed in the men's 5000 metres event, being eliminated in the first round.

Sermsak served in the Royal Thai Police, reaching the rank of police major general. He became the first deputy commander overseeing the Buriram Provincial Police in 1990, and the first commander of the Mahasarakhan Provincial Police in 1996. He was commander of Udon Thani Provincial Police in 1998. In retirement, he served as Deputy Chief Executive of the Udon Thani Provincial Administrative Organization.
