= Anatoly Olizarenko =

Soviet cyclist

Personal information
- Born: 25 September 1936 Leningrad, Russian SFSR, Soviet Union
- Died: 30 January 1984 (aged 47) Shikotan, Sakhalin Oblast, Russian SFSR, Soviet Union
- Height: 1.76 m (5 ft 9 in)
- Weight: 72 kg (159 lb)

Sport
- Sport: Cycling
Medal record
Representing the Soviet Union
World Championships
Bronze medal – third place	1963 Rocourt	Team time trial

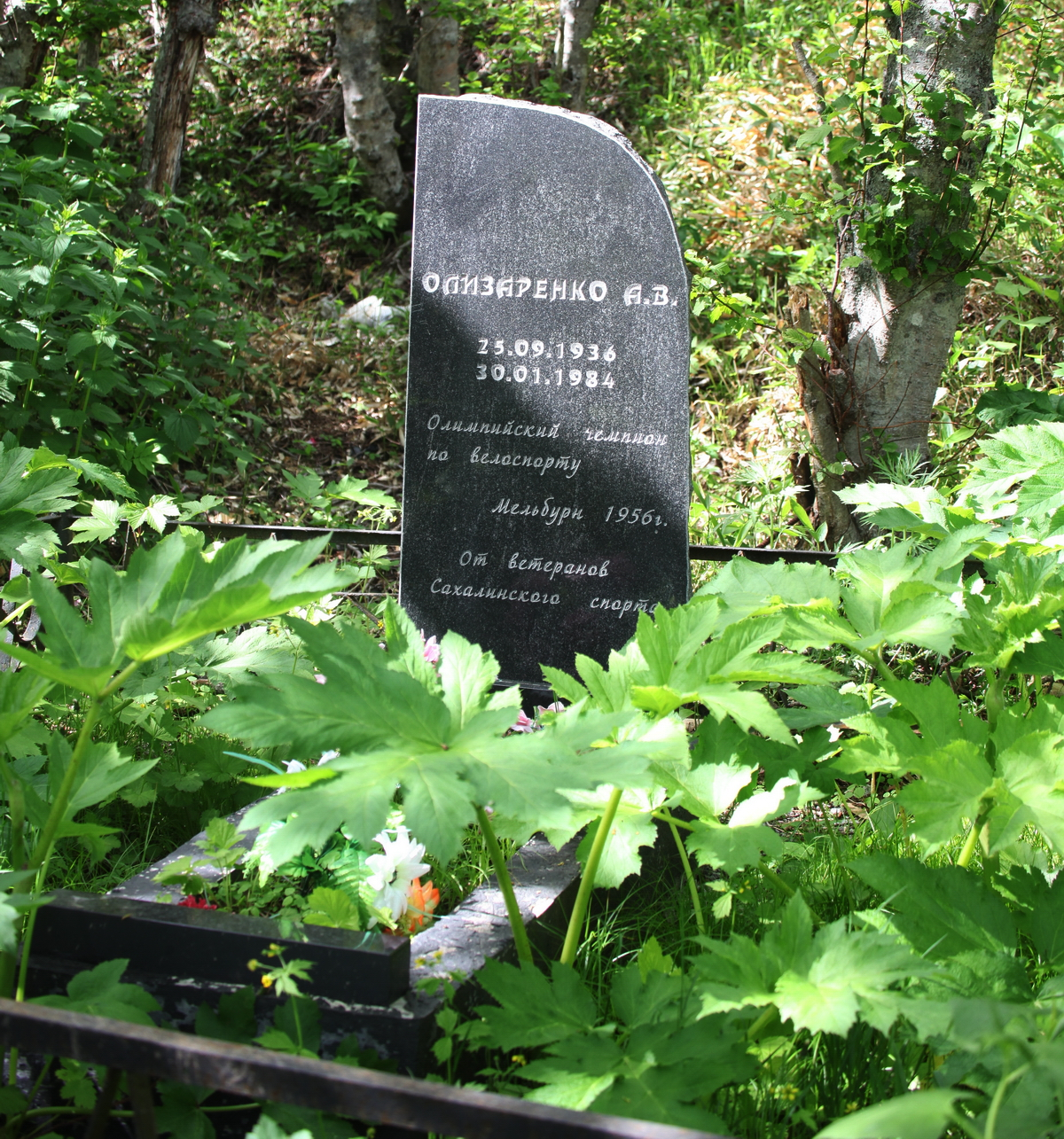
Anatoly Olizarenko's headstone

Anatoly Vladimirovich Olizarenko (Russian: Анатолий Владимирович Олизаренко; 25 September 1936 – 30 January 1984) was a Soviet cyclist. He competed in the individual road race and the team time trial at the 1964 Summer Olympics and finished in 56th and 5th place, respectively.

Olizarenko won the Tour d'Egypte in 1958. In 1960 he placed third in the Tour of Poland and ninth in the Peace Race. In 1963, he was again ninth in the Peace Race, but won a bronze medal at the world championships in the team time trial. In 1966 he rode his last Peace Race, winning it with the Soviet team, but finishing only 54th individually. He retired after the race.
