= Stepan Baidiuk =

Ukrainian long-distance runner

Personal information
- Full name: Stepan Savovych Baidiuk
- Nationality: Ukrainian
- Born: 28 November 1940 (age 85)

Sport
- Sport: Long-distance running
- Event: 5000 metres

Stepan Savovych Baidiuk (born 28 November 1940) is a Ukrainian long-distance runner. He competed in the men's 5000 metres at the 1964 Summer Olympics, representing the Soviet Union.
