= Galina Gayda =

Russian sprinter

Personal information
- Nationality: Russian
- Born: 28 February 1936 (age 89)

Sport
- Sport: Sprinting
- Event: 100 metres

Galina Gayda (born 28 February 1936) is a Russian sprinter. She competed in the women's 100 metres at the 1964 Summer Olympics.
