= Nikolai Bagley =

Ukrainian basketball player (1937–1991)

Personal information
- Born: 25 February 1937 Kyiv, Ukrainian SSR, Soviet Union
- Died: 3 March 1991 (aged 54)
- Height: 1.90 m (6 ft 3 in)
- Weight: 88 kg (194 lb)

Sport
- Sport: Basketball
- Club: BC Budivelnyk, Kyiv
Medal record
Representing the Soviet Union
Olympic Games
| Silver medal – second place | 1964 Tokyo | Team |
FIBA EuroBasket
| Gold medal – first place | 1965 Moscow | Team |

Nikolai Lvovich Baglei (Russian: Николай Львович Баглей; Ukrainian: Микола Львович Баглей; 25 February 1937 – 3 March 1991) was a Ukrainian basketball player. Playing for the Soviet team he won a silver medal at the 1964 Summer Olympics, as well as gold medals at EuroBasket 1965 and Summer Universiades of 1959 and 1961. Since his death in 1991, an annual international basketball tournament is carried out in Kyiv in his honor.
