= Viktor Semyonov =

Soviet race walker

Personal information
- Full name: Viktor Semyonovich Semyonov
- Nationality: Soviet
- Born: 28 June 1949 (age 77)

Sport
- Sport: Athletics
- Event: Racewalking

Viktor Semyonovich Semyonov (born 28 June 1949) is a Soviet racewalker. He competed in the men's 20 kilometres walk at the 1976 Summer Olympics.
