= John Herring (athlete) =

British runner (1935–2003)

Personal information
- Born: 10 April 1935 Lewisham, Greater London, Great Britain
- Died: 7 October 2003 (aged 68) Lavenham, Suffolk, England
- Height: 1.80 m (5 ft 11 in)
- Weight: 53 kg (117 lb)

Sport
- Sport: Athletics
- Event: 5000 m
- Club: Blackheath Harriers

John Bryan Herring (10 April 1935 – 7 October 2003), was a British athlete who ran in the 1964 Summer Olympic Games. He was assistant director of the Crystal Palace National Sports Centre, a member of the London Marathon organising team and a long-time member of Blackheath and Bromley Harriers Athletic Club.

== Competitive career ==
He was a member of Blackheath Harriers. In 1964 he was ranked fourth in the UK behind Mike Wiggs, Fergus Murray and Bruce Tulloh. He represented Britain over 5000 metres in the 1964 Summer Olympics when Tulloh withdrew with measles.

He remained a member of Blackheath Harriers for 50 years and in 2015 still holds the club record for Men Masters (over 40) mile at 4.23.3 set on 30 July 1975.

=== Personal Bests ===
Date	Distance	Time	Venue
20 Jun 1965	3000 metres	8:02.2	Warsaw, Poland
22 Jul 1964	2 miles	8:37.6	London, UK
14 Aug 1964	5000 metres	13:51.4	London, UK

== Athletics Administration ==
From 1970 to 1987 he held the post of assistant director at the Crystal Palace National Sports Centre. He became involved with the International Athletes' Club (IAC) and in his capacity as chairman of the IAC he became race director for the first IAC Coca-Cola sponsored invitation meeting at Crystal Palace in the early 1970s. The venue became the London home of athletics meetings when White City Stadium was demolished.

After the successful first running of the London Marathon he was brought into the marathon's management team. He was responsible for the start for 12 years from 1982. From 1994 to 1996 he was the Marathon's course manager and from 1996 he was a consultant to the Marathon.
