= Vitaliy Tyshchenko =

Personal information
- Nationality: Soviet Union, Ukraine
- Born: 28 July 1957 (age 68) Nosivka
- Height: 174 cm (5 ft 9 in)
- Weight: 58 kg (128 lb)

Sport
- Country: Soviet Union
- Sport: Middle-distance running

Vitaliy Tyshchenko (Ukrainian: Віталій Тищенко, born 28 July 1957) is a Soviet Olympic middle-distance runner. He represented his country in the men's 1500 meters at the 1980 Summer Olympics. His time was a 3:44.39 in the first heat, and a 3:41.42 in the semifinals.
