= Zenji Okuzawa =

Japanese middle-distance runner (1937–2021)

Personal information
- Nationality: Japanese
- Born: 26 November 1937
- Died: 5 July 2021 (aged 83)

Sport
- Sport: Middle-distance running
- Event: Steeplechase

Zenji Okuzawa (奥沢 善二, Okuzawa Zenji; 26 November 1937 – 5 July 2021) was a Japanese middle-distance runner. He competed in the men's 3000 metres steeplechase at the 1964 Summer Olympics.
