= Adolfas Aleksejūnas =

Lithuanian middle-distance runner (born 1937)

Personal information
- Nationality: Lithuanian
- Born: 27 June 1937 (age 89) Meldiniai, Lithuania
- Height: 172 cm (5 ft 8 in)
- Weight: 66 kg (146 lb)

Sport
- Sport: Middle-distance running
- Event: Steeplechase

Adolfas Aleksejūnas (Адольфас Алексеюнас; born 27 June 1937) is a Lithuanian middle-distance runner. He competed in the men's 3000 metres steeplechase at the 1964 Summer Olympics, representing the Soviet Union.
