= Sergey Budalov =

Soviet-Russian high jumper

Sergey Budalov (Russian: Сергей Будалов; born 7 August 1949) is a retired high jumper who represented the Soviet Union. Budalov trained at Spartak in Moscow Oblast. He finished fourth at the 1976 Olympic Games in Montreal and eighth at the 1971 European Indoor Championships in Sofia. On national level he became Soviet champion in high jump on three occasions, setting a new championship record of 2.25 metres in 1976.
