= Athletics at the Spartakiad of the Peoples of the USSR =

Athletics was one of the sports at the Spartakiad of the Peoples of the USSR, and featured on the programme at all ten editions of the competition from 1956 to 1991. The competition was incorporated into the annual Soviet Athletics Championships in 1963, 1967, 1971, 1975, 1979, 1983 and 1991. The 1986 edition was not incorporated into the senior national championship as the Spartakiad imposed an upper age limit of 23 years for competitors that year. The results of the 1986 men's 10,000 metres were excluded from the Spartakiad rankings due to the slow finishing times achieved in the 30 degree heat.

The team competitions were generally staged between the Republics of the Soviet Union plus separate teams for Moscow and Leningrad, although foreign athletes competed in 1979 and 1983, and the team competition was abolished for the final edition.

== Editions ==
Edition	Year	Venue	City	Nation	Start date	End date	Athletes	Teams	Events	Top Placed Team
I	1956	Central Lenin Stadium	Moscow	Soviet Union	5 August	16 August			36	Moscow
II	1959	Central Lenin Stadium	Moscow	Soviet Union	9 August	14 August	1343	17	38	Leningrad
III	1963	Central Lenin Stadium	Moscow	Soviet Union	9 August	15 August			37	Moscow
IV	1967	Central Lenin Stadium	Moscow	Soviet Union	28 July	1 August			41	Russian SFSR
V	1971	Central Lenin Stadium	Moscow	Soviet Union	16 July	19 July			41	Ukrainian SSR
VI	1975	Central Lenin Stadium	Moscow	Soviet Union	27 July	30 July			39	Moscow
VII	1979	Central Lenin Stadium	Moscow	Soviet Union	21 July	29 July	over 1500 (including 200 foreign)		42	Russian SFSR
VIII	1983	Central Lenin Stadium	Moscow	Soviet Union	18 June	22 June	over 1500 (including foreign)	32 (countries)	39	Russian SFSR
IX	1986	Pakhtakor Central Stadium	Tashkent	Soviet Union	16 September	20 September			42	Ukrainian SSR
X	1991	Republican Stadium	Kiev	Soviet Union	10 July	13 July			44	None

- The marathon events were twice staged outside the main track and field meeting – 14 May in 1983 and on 21 April in Bila Tserkva in 1991.
