= Mike Wiggs =

British athlete

Personal information
- Nationality: British (English)
- Born: 25 April 1938 Watford, England
- Died: 8 December 2011 (aged 73) Rickmansworth, England
- Height: 185 cm (6 ft 1 in)
- Weight: 73 kg (161 lb)

Sport
- Sport: Athletics
- Event: Middle-distance running
- Club: Thames Valley Harriers

Michael Edwin Wiggs (25 April 1938 – 8 December 2011) was a British middle-distance runner who competed at two Olympic Games.

== Biography ==
Wiggs finished second behind László Tábori in the 1 mile event at the 1960 AAA Championships.

At the 1960 Olympic Games in Rome, he represented Great Britain in the men's 1500 metres.

Wiggs finished runner-up to Alan Simpson at the 1964 AAA Championships and shortly afterwards attended a second Olympic Games at the 1964 Olympic Games in Tokyo, representing Great Britain in the men's 5,000 metres.
