= Nikolay Dutov =

Soviet long-distance runner

Personal information
- Nationality: Soviet
- Born: 19 December 1938 Tambovsky District, Tambov Oblast, Russian SFSR, Soviet Union
- Died: 6 January 1992 (aged 53) Tambov, Tambov Oblast, Russia

Sport
- Sport: Long-distance running
- Event: 5000 metres

Nikolay Dutov (19 December 1938 – 6 January 1992) was a Soviet long-distance runner. He competed in the men's 5000 metres at the 1964 Summer Olympics.
