= Tamara Tikhonina =

Soviet volleyball player

Personal information
- Full name: Tamara Petrovna Tikhonina
- Nickname: Тамара Петровна Тихонина
- Nationality: Soviet
- Born: February 22, 1937 (age 89); Baku, Azerbaijani SSR, Soviet Union

National team
Soviet Union
Honours
Women's volleyball
Representing the Soviet Union
Olympic Games
Silver medal – second place	1964 Tokyo	Team competition

Tamara Petrovna Tikhonina (Russian: Тамара Петровна Тихонина, born February 22, 1937) is a Soviet former competitive volleyball player and Olympic silver medalist.
