= Leonid Ivanov (runner) =

Personal information
- Born: 25 August 1937 (age 88) Zaporizhia, Ukrainian SSR, Soviet Union

Sport
- Sport: Track and field
Medal record
Representing Soviet Union
Summer Universiade
Gold medal – first place	1963 Porto Alegre	5000m

Leonid Anatolyevich Ivanov (Ukrainian: Лео́нід Іва́нов; born 25 August 1937) is a former long-distance runner who competed in the 10,000 metres at the 1964 Summer Olympics for the Soviet Union.
