= Lyudmila Gureyeva =

Soviet volleyball player (1943–2017)

Personal information
- Full name: Lyudmila Nikolayevna Gureyeva
- Nickname: Людмила Николаевна Гуреева
- Nationality: Russian
- Born: 12 February 1943; Odesa, Romania
- Died: 4 October 2017 (aged 74); Moscow, Russia

National team
Soviet Union
Honours
Women's volleyball
Representing the Soviet Union
Silver medal – second place	1964 Tokyo	Team competition

Lyudmila Nikolayevna Gureyeva (Russian: Людмила Николаевна Гуреева; 12 February 1943 – 4 October 2017) was a Soviet competitive volleyball player and Olympic silver medalist in the 1964 Summer Olympics.
