= Lazar Naroditsky =

Ukrainian middle-distance runner

Personal information
- Nationality: Ukrainian
- Born: 18 December 1937 Kyiv, Ukraine, Soviet Union
- Died: 24 October 2000 (aged 62) Saint Petersburg, Russia

Sport
- Sport: Middle-distance running
- Event: Steeplechase

Lazar Naroditsky (18 December 1937 – 24 October 2000) was a Ukrainian middle-distance runner. He competed in the men's 3000 metres steeplechase at the 1964 Summer Olympics, representing the Soviet Union.
