= Ivan Belyayev (runner) =

Soviet steeplechase runner

Olympic medal record

Men's athletics
Bronze medal – third place	1964 Tokyo	3000 m steeplechase

Ivan Pavlovich Belyayev (Russian: Иван Павлович Беляев) (born 10 August 1935) is a Soviet former athlete who competed mainly in the 3000 metre steeple chase, training at VSS Avanhard in Dnipropetrovsk.

He competed for the USSR in the 1964 Summer Olympics held in Tokyo, Japan, in the 3000 metre steeplechase where he won the bronze medal.
