= Laine Erik =

Estonian agricultural scientist and middle-distance runner (1942–2024)

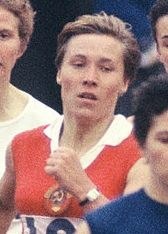
- Erik at the 1964 Olympics

Personal information
- Born: 21 April 1942 Särevere, Reichskommissariat Ostland
- Died: 6 October 2024 (aged 82)
- Education: Estonian University of Life Sciences
- Height: 1.68 m (5 ft 6 in)
- Weight: 64 kg (141 lb)

Sport
- Sport: Athletics
- Event: 800 m
- Club: Kalev Tartu

Achievements and titles
- Personal best: 800 m – 2:03.6 (1967)
Medal record
Representing the Soviet Union
Summer Universiade
Gold medal – first place	1965 Budapest	800 metres

Laine Erik (later Kallas; 21 April 1942 – 6 October 2024) was an Estonian agricultural scientist and middle-distance runner.

== Running ==
Erik specialised in the 800 metres. In this event she finished sixth at the 1964 Olympics, while at the 1968 Games she was eliminated in semifinals. She won the Soviet titles in 1964, 1967 and 1968. In 1965 she won a gold medal at the Summer Universiade, and in 1964 she was part of the Soviet 3×800 m team that set a world record.

== Science ==
Erik graduated from the Zootechnics Faculty of Estonian Agricultural Academy in 1969 and in 1984 defended a PhD in agricultural sciences. Between 1969 and 1996 she worked as a researcher at the Institute of Animal Science of Estonian Agricultural University, and after that as a company manager.

== Death ==
Erik died on 6 October 2024, at the age of 82.

Awards and achievements
Preceded by None (Title established)	Estonian Sportswoman of the Year; 1967–1968	Succeeded by Svetlana Tširkova
