= Athletics at the 1972 Summer Olympics – Men's discus throw =

Men's discus throw at the Games of the XX Olympiad
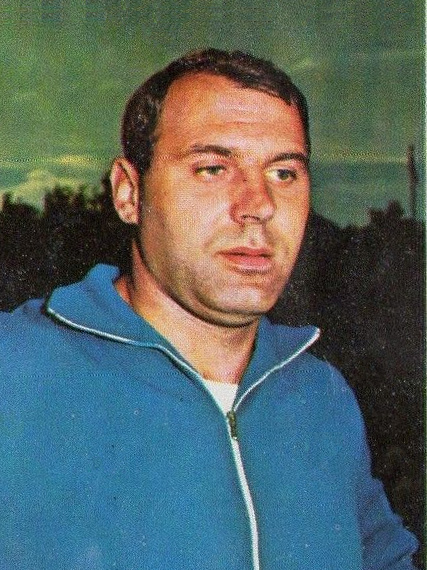
- Ludvík Daněk
- Venue: Olympic Stadium
- Dates: September 1 & 2, 1972
- Competitors: 29 from 18 nations
- Winning distance: 64.40

Medalists
1st place, gold medalist(s)		Ludvík Daněk; Czechoslovakia
2nd place, silver medalist(s)		Jay Silvester; United States
3rd place, bronze medalist(s)		Ricky Bruch; Sweden

The men's discus throw field event at the 1972 Olympic Games took place on September 1 and 2. Twenty-nine athletes from 18 nations competed. The maximum number of athletes per nation had been set at 3 since the 1930 Olympic Congress. After the retirement of four-time Olympic champion Al Oerter, this was an event that was open to everyone. The favorite was two-time Olympic medalist and 1971 European Champion Ludvík Daněk. Daněk won, completing a full set of three different medals in the event; it was Czechoslovakia's first gold medal in the men's discus throw. Daněk was the second man (after Oerter) to win three medals in the event. Jay Silvester of the United States took silver, keeping alive the American streak of medaling in every appearance of the event (though the nation's five-Games gold medal streak ended). Ricky Bruch earned Sweden's first medal in the men's discus throw with his bronze.

== Background ==
This was the 17th appearance of the event, which is one of 12 athletics events to have been held at every Summer Olympics. Returning finalists from the 1968 Games were bronze medalist (and 1964 silver medalist) Ludvík Daněk of Czechoslovakia, fourth-place finisher (and 1964 finalist) Hartmut Losch of East Germany, fifth-place finisher (and 1964 finalist) Jay Silvester of the United States, eighth-place finisher Ricky Bruch of Sweden, ninth-place finisher Hein-Direck Neu of West Germany, eleventh-place finisher Ferenc Tégla of Hungary, and twelfth-place finisher Robin Tait of New Zealand. Daněk was favored, though Silvester and Bruch (who shared the world record) were also serious contenders.

India and Saudi Arabia each made their debut in the men's discus throw. The United States made its 17th appearance, having competed in every edition of the Olympic men's discus throw to date.

== Competition format ==
The competition used the two-round format introduced in 1936, with the qualifying round completely separate from the divided final. In qualifying, each athlete received three attempts; those recording a mark of at least 59.00 metres advanced to the final. If fewer than 12 athletes achieved that distance, the top 12 would advance. The results of the qualifying round were then ignored. Finalists received three throws each, with the top eight competitors receiving an additional three attempts. The best distance among those six throws counted.

== Records ==
Prior to the competition, the existing world and Olympic records were as follows.

World record	Jay Silvester (USA); Ricky Bruch (SWE)	68.40	Reno, United States; Stockholm, Sweden	18 September 1968; 5 July 1972
Olympic record	Al Oerter (USA)	64.78	Mexico City, Mexico	15 October 1968

For the first time since 1920, no new Olympic record was set in the event.

== Schedule ==
All times are Central European Time (UTC+1)

Date	Time	Round
Friday, 1 September 1972	10:00	Qualifying
Saturday, 2 September 1972	15:00	Final

== Results ==
All throwers reaching 59.00 m (193 ft 7 in) and the top 12 including ties advanced to the finals. All qualifiers are shown in blue. All distances are listed in metres.

=== Qualifying ===
Rank	Athlete	Nation	Group	1	2	3	Distance	Notes
1	Ludvík Daněk	Czechoslovakia	B	64.32	—	—	64.32	Q
2	Jorma Rinne	Finland	B	62.02	—	—	62.02	Q
3	Géza Fejér	Hungary	B	61.58	—	—	61.58	Q
4	Pentti Kahma	Finland	A	58.50	61.24	—	61.24	Q
5	Ricky Bruch	Sweden	A	61.24	—	—	61.24	Q
6	Jay Silvester	United States	A	58.98	61.20	—	61.20	Q
7	Ferenc Tégla	Hungary	A	60.60	—	—	60.60	Q
8	János Murányi	Hungary	B	54.42	60.34	—	60.34	Q
9	Silvano Simeon	Italy	B	58.38	59.78	—	59.78	Q
10	Tim Vollmer	United States	A	59.60	—	—	59.60	Q
11	Namakoro Niaré	Mali	A	59.38	—	—	59.38	Q
12	Detlef Thorith	East Germany	A	59.36	—	—	59.36	Q
13	John Powell	United States	B	54.94	59.30	—	59.30	Q
14	Les Mills	New Zealand	A	59.22	—	—	59.22	Q
15	Klaus-Peter Hennig	West Germany	A	55.32	X	58.64	58.64	
16	Dirk Wippermann	West Germany	B	56.42	58.10	57.96	58.10	
17	Hein-Direck Neu	West Germany	A	56.36	58.10	X	58.10	
18	Zdravko Pečar	Yugoslavia	B	X	57.84	53.52	57.84	
19	Bill Tancred	Great Britain	B	X	55.86	57.24	57.24	
20	Robin Tait	New Zealand	B	56.60	55.88	X	56.60	
21	Ain Roost	Canada	A	56.58	55.48	X	56.58	
22	Hartmut Losch	East Germany	B	56.64	X	56.28	56.64	
23	Erlendur Valdimarsson	Iceland	B	55.38	55.16	53.26	55.38	
24	John Watts	Great Britain	A	53.48	X	53.86	53.86	
25	Kaj Andersen	Denmark	A	X	51.60	53.52	53.52	
26	Praveen Kumar	India	B	52.58	53.12	51.58	53.12	
27	Heimo Reinitzer	Austria	B	X	52.32	52.56	52.56	
28	Said Farouk Al-Turki	Saudi Arabia	A	X	33.78	X	33.78	
—	Armando de Vincentis	Italy	A	X	X	X	No mark	
—	Stoyan Slavkov	Bulgaria	A	DNS				
—	Julio Bequer	Cuba	B	DNS				
—	Joussef Nagui Assad	Egypt	B	DNS				
—	Noel Matouba	Republic of the Congo	B	DNS				

=== Final ===
Rank	Athlete	Nation	1	2	3	4	5	6	Distance
1st place, gold medalist(s)	Ludvík Daněk	Czechoslovakia	58.12	60.38	62.38	62.54	61.70	64.40	64.40
2nd place, silver medalist(s)	Jay Silvester	United States	62.12	X	63.50	X	X	62.86	63.50
3rd place, bronze medalist(s)	Ricky Bruch	Sweden	59.12	X	61.52	62.76	63.40	62.60	63.40
4	John Powell	United States	61.92	62.82	60.44	X	61.38	X	62.82
5	Géza Fejér	Hungary	62.50	62.56	X	X	61.50	62.62	62.62
6	Detlef Thorith	East Germany	61.74	62.42	61.06	X	59.88	X	62.42
7	Ferenc Tégla	Hungary	58.38	59.66	57.40	X	58.16	60.60	60.60
8	Tim Vollmer	United States	59.26	60.24	X	X	X	58.54	60.24
9	Pentti Kahma	Finland	57.20	58.92	59.66	Did not advance			59.66
10	Silvano Simeon	Italy	58.80	59.34	58.36	Did not advance			59.34
11	Jorma Rinne	Finland	57.30	56.88	59.22	Did not advance			59.22
12	János Murányi	Hungary	57.92	57.16	X	Did not advance			57.92
13	Namakoro Niaré	Mali	56.48	55.10	X	Did not advance			56.48
14	Les Mills	New Zealand	X	54.48	55.86	Did not advance			55.86
