= 1974 European Athletics Championships – Men's discus throw =

Men's discus throw at the European Athletics Championships

The men's discus throw at the 1974 European Athletics Championships was held in Rome, Italy, at Stadio Olimpico on 3 and 4 September 1974.

== Medalists ==
| Gold | Pentti Kahma; Finland |
| Silver | Ludvík Daněk; Czechoslovakia |
| Bronze | Ricky Bruch; Sweden |

== Results ==
=== Final ===
4 September

| Rank | Name | Nationality | Result | Notes |
|---|---|---|---|---|
| 1st place, gold medalist(s) | Pentti Kahma | Finland | 63.62 | |
| 2nd place, silver medalist(s) | Ludvík Daněk | Czechoslovakia | 62.76 | |
| 3rd place, bronze medalist(s) | Ricky Bruch | Sweden | 62.00 | |
| 4 | Siegfried Pachale | East Germany | 61.20 | |
| 5 | Velko Velev | Bulgaria | 61.00 | |
| 6 | Viktor Penzikov | Soviet Union | 60.86 | |
| 7 | Armando De Vincentiis | Italy | 59.68 | |
| 8 | Wolfgang Schmidt | East Germany | 59.56 | |
| 9 | Géza Fejér | Hungary | 59.46 | |
| 10 | Ferenc Tégla | Hungary | 58.92 | |
| 11 | Leszek Gajdziński | Poland | 58.88 | |
| 12 | Hein-Direck Neu | West Germany | 58.80 | |
| 13 | Gunnar Müller | East Germany | 58.32 | |
| 14 | Silvano Simeon | Italy | 56.14 | |
| 15 | Juhani Tuomola | Finland | 55.58 | |

=== Qualification ===
3 September

| Rank | Name | Nationality | Result | Notes |
|---|---|---|---|---|
| 1 | Ludvík Daněk | Czechoslovakia | 61.60 | Q |
| 2 | Pentti Kahma | Finland | 61.06 | Q |
| 3 | Géza Fejér | Hungary | 60.08 | Q |
| 4 | Velko Velev | Bulgaria | 59.72 | Q |
| 5 | Viktor Penzikov | Soviet Union | 59.50 | Q |
| 6 | Gunnar Müller | East Germany | 59.46 | Q |
| 7 | Leszek Gajdziński | Poland | 59.42 | Q |
| 8 | Armando De Vincentiis | Italy | 59.04 | Q |
| 9 | Wolfgang Schmidt | East Germany | 58.90 | Q |
| 10 | Hein-Direck Neu | West Germany | 58.80 | Q |
| 11 | Ricky Bruch | Sweden | 58.40 | Q |
| 12 | Siegfried Pachale | East Germany | 58.28 | Q |
| 13 | Silvano Simeon | Italy | 58.22 | Q |
| 14 | Ferenc Tégla | Hungary | 58.16 | Q |
| 15 | Juhani Tuomola | Finland | 58.00 | Q |
| 16 | Markku Tuokko | Finland | 57.82 | |
| 17 | Viktor Zhurba | Soviet Union | 57.62 | |
| 18 | Bill Tancred | Great Britain | 57.36 | |
| 19 | János Murányi | Hungary | 57.36 | |
| 20 | Stanisław Wołodko | Poland | 57.24 | |
| 21 | Josef Šilhavý | Czechoslovakia | 57.04 | |
| 22 | John Hillier | Great Britain | 55.58 | |

== Participation ==
According to an unofficial count, 22 athletes from 11 countries participated in the event.

- Bulgaria (1)
- Czechoslovakia (2)
- East Germany (3)
- Finland (3)
- Hungary (3)
- Italy (2)
- Poland (2)
- Soviet Union (2)
- Sweden (1)
- Great Britain (2)
- West Germany (1)
