= 1971 European Athletics Championships – Men's discus throw =

Men's discus throw at the European Athletics Championships

The men's discus throw at the 1971 European Athletics Championships was held in Helsinki, Finland, at Helsinki Olympic Stadium on 14 and 15 August 1971.

== Medalists ==
Gold	Ludvík Daněk; Czechoslovakia
Silver	Lothar Milde; East Germany
Bronze	Géza Fejér; Hungary

== Results ==
=== Final ===
15 August

Rank	Name	Nationality	Result	Notes
1st place, gold medalist(s)	Ludvík Daněk	Czechoslovakia	63.90	CR
2nd place, silver medalist(s)	Lothar Milde	East Germany	61.62	
3rd place, bronze medalist(s)	Géza Fejér	Hungary	61.54	
4	Dirk Wippermann	West Germany	61.36	
5	Hartmut Losch	East Germany	60.86	
6	Pentti Kahma	Finland	60.64	
7	Ferenc Tégla	Hungary	59.24	
8	Jorma Rinne	Finland	59.22	
9	Ricky Bruch	Sweden	59.08	
10	Heimo Reinitzer	Austria	58.30	
11	Klaus-Peter Hennig	West Germany	56.36	
12	Risto Myyrä	Finland	54.16	

=== Qualification ===
14 August

Rank	Name	Nationality	Result	Notes
1	Hartmut Losch	East Germany	62.16	CR Q
2	Dirk Wippermann	West Germany	60.98	Q
3	Géza Fejér	Hungary	60.86	Q
4	Lothar Milde	East Germany	60.62	Q
5	Ricky Bruch	Sweden	60.50	Q
6	Ferenc Tégla	Hungary	60.04	Q
7	Ludvík Daněk	Czechoslovakia	59.44	Q
8	Pentti Kahma	Finland	59.24	Q
9	Klaus-Peter Hennig	West Germany	59.06	Q
10	Heimo Reinitzer	Austria	59.02	Q
11	Risto Myyrä	Finland	58.38	Q
12	Jorma Rinne	Finland	58.02	Q
13	Hein-Direck Neu	West Germany	57.64	
14	Iosif Nagy	Romania	57.58	
15	Kenneth Åkesson	Sweden	56.92	
16	Ernst Soudek	Austria	56.64	
17	Leszek Gajdziński	Poland	56.50	
18	Kaj Andersen	Denmark	55.56	
19	János Faragó	Hungary	55.56	
20	John Watts	Great Britain	55.52	
21	Armando De Vicentis	Italy	55.48	
22	Vladimir Lyakhov	Soviet Union	55.44	
23	Tormod Lislerud	Norway	55.36	
24	Zdravko Pečar	Yugoslavia	55.32	
	Silvano Simeon	Italy	NM	
	Erlendur Valdimarsson	Iceland	NM	

== Participation ==
According to an unofficial count, 26 athletes from 16 countries participated in the event.

- Austria (2)
- Czechoslovakia (1)
- Denmark (1)
- East Germany (2)
- Finland (3)
- Hungary (3)
- Iceland (1)
- Italy (2)
- Norway (1)
- Poland (1)
- Romania (1)
- Soviet Union (1)
- Sweden (2)
- Great Britain (1)
- West Germany (3)
- Yugoslavia (1)
