= Athletics at the 1976 Summer Olympics – Men's discus throw =

Men's discus throw at the Games of the XXI Olympiad
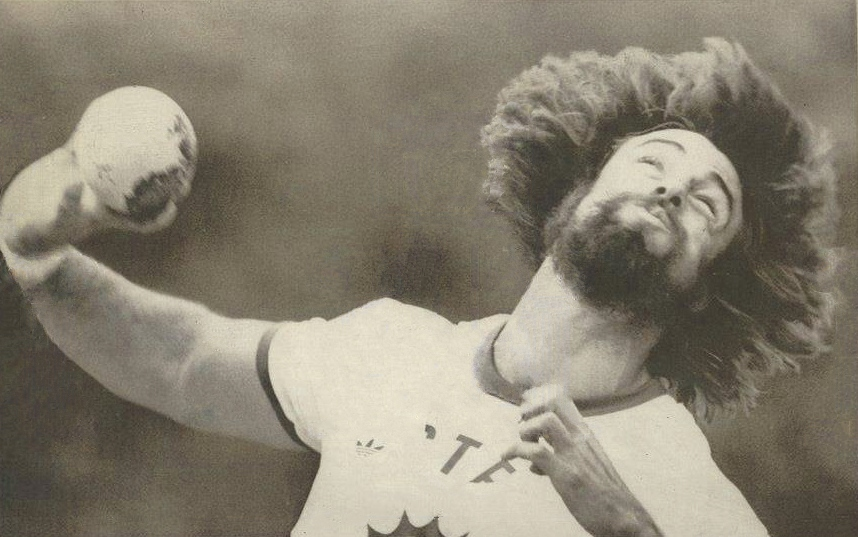
- Mac Wilkins
- Venue: Olympic Stadium
- Dates: 24 July 1976 (qualifying); 25 July 1976 (final)
- Competitors: 30 from 20 nations
- Winning distance: 67.50

Medalists
1st place, gold medalist(s)		Mac Wilkins; United States
2nd place, silver medalist(s)		Wolfgang Schmidt; East Germany
3rd place, bronze medalist(s)		John Powell; United States

The men's discus throw event at the 1976 Summer Olympics in Montreal, Quebec, Canada had an entry list of 30 competitors from 20 nations, with two qualifying groups (30 jumpers) before the final (15) took place on Sunday July 25, 1976. The maximum number of athletes per nation had been set at 3 since the 1930 Olympic Congress. The top twelve and ties, and all those reaching 60.00 metres advanced to the final. The qualification round was held in Saturday July 24, 1976. The event was won by Mac Wilkins of the United States, the nation's 13th victory in the men's discus throw. Wolfgang Schmidt took silver, matching East Germany's best result to date in the event. John Powell gave the United States a second medal in the competition with his bronze. Czechoslovakia's three-Games medal streak, all won by Ludvík Daněk, ended as Daněk finished ninth; the American streak reached 18 Games.

== Background ==
This was the 18th appearance of the event, which is one of 12 athletics events to have been held at every Summer Olympics. Returning finalists from the 1972 Games were returning champion and three-time medalist Ludvík Daněk of Czechoslovakia, silver medalist (and three-time finalist) Jay Silvester of the United States, bronze medalist Ricky Bruch of Sweden, fourth-place finisher John Powell of the United States, seventh-place finisher (and 1968 finalist) Ferenc Tégla of Hungary, ninth-place finisher Pentti Kahma of Finland, and tenth-place finisher Silvano Simeon of Italy. Powell had been the best discus thrower in 1975, including breaking the world record, but countryman and rival Mac Wilkins rose to prominence in early 1976—setting a new world record in April and bettering it three times in one meet in May, breaking the 70 metres mark for the first time. Wolfgang Schmidt of East Germany was the strongest challenger to the Americans.

Senegal made its debut in the men's discus throw. The United States made its 18th appearance, having competed in every edition of the Olympic men's discus throw to date.

== Competition format ==
The competition used the two-round format introduced in 1936, with the qualifying round completely separate from the divided final. In qualifying, each athlete received three attempts; those recording a mark of at least 60.00 metres advanced to the final. If fewer than 12 athletes achieved that distance, the top 12 would advance. The results of the qualifying round were then ignored. Finalists received three throws each, with the top eight competitors receiving an additional three attempts. The best distance among those six throws counted.

== Records ==
Prior to the competition, the existing world and Olympic records were as follows.

World record	Mac Wilkins (USA)	70.86	San Jose, California, United States	1 May 1976
Olympic record	Al Oerter (USA)	64.78	Mexico City, Mexico	15 October 1968

Mac Wilkins had a qualifying round throw of 68.28 metres to break the Olympic record. Nobody, including Wilkins, was able to better that in the final, though all three medalists finished better than the old record.

== Schedule ==
All times are Eastern Daylight Time (UTC-4)

Date	Time	Round
Saturday, 24 July 1976	10:00	Qualifying
Sunday, 25 July 1976	15:00	Final

== Results ==
=== Qualifying ===
Rank	Athlete	Nation	1	2	3	Distance	Notes
1	Mac Wilkins	United States	68.28	—	—	68.28	Q, OR
2	Velko Velev	Bulgaria	63.54	—	—	63.54	
3	Wolfgang Schmidt	East Germany	63.14	—	—	63.14	
4	Armando De Vincentiis	Italy	62.26	—	—	62.26	
5	Pentti Kahma	Finland	62.10	—	—	62.10	
6	Jay Silvester	United States	X	62.06	—	62.06	
7	Hein-Direck Neu	West Germany	X	58.90	61.88	61.88	
8	Ferenc Tégla	Hungary	57.00	61.66	—	61.66	
9	John Powell	United States	X	61.48	—	61.48	
10	Knut Hjeltnes	Norway	X	61.30	—	61.30	
11	Norbert Thiede	East Germany	61.14	—	—	61.14	
12	Josef Šilhavý	Czechoslovakia	60.82	—	—	60.82	
13	Siegfried Pachale	East Germany	X	60.64	—	60.64	
14	Ludvík Daněk	Czechoslovakia	60.44	—	—	60.44	
15	János Faragó	Hungary	59.30	60.06	—	60.06	
16	Julián Morrinson	Cuba	59.92	56.66	58.50	59.92	
17	Markku Tuokko	Finland	59.80	59.26	57.18	59.80	
18	Stanisław Wołodko	Poland	57.56	57.84	59.42	59.42	
19	Silvano Simeon	Italy	58.76	59.06	X	59.06	
20	Ricky Bruch	Sweden	56.98	X	58.06	58.06	
21	Nikolay Vikhor	Soviet Union	X	57.50	54.52	57.50	
22	Iosif Naghi	Romania	X	X	57.28	57.28	
23	Ain Roost	Canada	56.56	X	X	56.56	
24	Borys Chambul	Canada	X	55.86	X	55.86	
25	Pete Tancred	Great Britain	55.20	X	55.50	55.50	
26	Jos Schroeder	Belgium	X	54.04	54.80	54.80	
27	Ibrahima Guèye	Senegal	52.82	X	52.76	52.82	
28	Salman Hessam	Iran	52.40	50.40	X	52.40	
29	Mahmoud Al-Zabramawi	Saudi Arabia	31.80	35.30	35.94	35.94	
—	Bishop Dolegiewicz	Canada	X	X	X	No mark	

=== Final ===
Rank	Athlete	Nation	1	2	3	4	5	6	Distance
1st place, gold medalist(s)	Mac Wilkins	United States	61.78	67.50	63.44	63.52	X	66.14	67.50
2nd place, silver medalist(s)	Wolfgang Schmidt	East Germany	63.68	X	65.16	X	63.96	66.22	66.22
3rd place, bronze medalist(s)	John Powell	United States	62.48	64.24	65.70	60.48	60.20	64.24	65.70
4	Norbert Thiede	East Germany	62.40	61.66	61.98	63.02	64.30	63.04	64.30
5	Siegfried Pachale	East Germany	59.62	64.04	60.02	61.08	59.62	64.24	64.24
6	Pentti Kahma	Finland	63.12	61.22	X	X	X	61.94	63.12
7	Knut Hjeltnes	Norway	60.26	62.02	61.60	61.26	61.24	63.06	63.06
8	Jay Silvester	United States	61.60	X	X	X	61.98	X	61.98
9	Ludvík Daněk	Czechoslovakia	60.12	61.28	59.62	Did not advance			61.28
10	Velko Velev	Bulgaria	60.94	60.68	X	Did not advance			60.94
11	Ferenc Tégla	Hungary	57.44	57.00	60.54	Did not advance			60.54
12	Hein-Direck Neu	West Germany	59.44	60.26	60.46	Did not advance			60.46
13	Josef Šilhavý	Czechoslovakia	57.62	58.42	X	Did not advance			58.42
14	János Faragó	Hungary	57.48	57.30	X	Did not advance			57.48
15	Armando De Vincentiis	Italy	55.86	X	X	Did not advance			55.68
