= Discus throw at the Olympics =

Discus throw at the Olympic Games
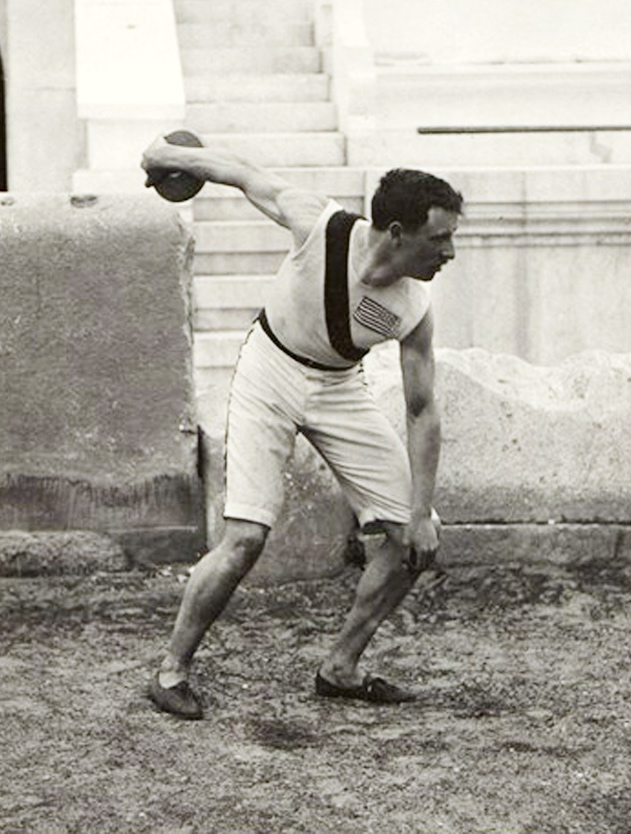
- The inaugural discus throw in 1896

Overview
- Sport: Athletics
- Gender: Men and women
- Years held: Men: 1896–2024; Women: 1928–2024

Olympic record
- Men: 70.00m Roje Stona (2024)
- Women: 72.30 m Martina Hellmann (1988)

Reigning champion
- Men: Roje Stona (JAM)
- Women: Valarie Allman (USA)

The discus throw is one of four track and field throwing events held at the Summer Olympics. The men's discus throw has been present on the Olympic athletics programme since 1896 (one of two throws events at the first Olympics, alongside the shot put). The women's event was first contested at the 1928 Olympics, being one of the five athletics events in the inaugural Olympic women's programme.

The Olympic records are 70 m (229 ft 7 3/4 in) for men, set by Roje Stona in 2024, and 72.30 m (237 ft 2 1/4 in) for women, set by Martina Hellmann in 1988.

Two variations on the event have been contested at the Olympics: a two-handed competition at the 1912 Stockholm Olympics, with athletes using both left and right arm putting techniques, and a stone throw at the 1906 Intercalated Games.

== Medalists (shows down below) ==
=== Men ===
Games	Gold	Silver	Bronze
1896 Athens	Robert Garrett; United States	Panagiotis Paraskevopoulos; Greece	Sotirios Versis; Greece
1900 Paris	Rudolf Bauer; Hungary	František Janda-Suk; Bohemia	Richard Sheldon; United States
1904 St. Louis	Martin Sheridan; United States	Ralph Rose; United States	Nikolaos Georgantas; Greece
1908 London	Martin Sheridan; United States	Merritt Giffin; United States	Bill Horr; United States
1912 Stockholm	Armas Taipale; Finland	Richard Byrd; United States	James Duncan; United States
1920 Antwerp	Elmer Niklander; Finland	Armas Taipale; Finland	Gus Pope; United States
1924 Paris	Bud Houser; United States	Vilho Niittymaa; Finland	Thomas Lieb; United States
1928 Amsterdam	Bud Houser; United States	Antero Kivi; Finland	James Corson; United States
1932 Los Angeles	John Anderson; United States	Henri LaBorde; United States	Paul Winter; France
1936 Berlin	Ken Carpenter; United States	Gordon Dunn; United States	Giorgio Oberweger; Italy
1948 London	Adolfo Consolini; Italy	Giuseppe Tosi; Italy	Fortune Gordien; United States
1952 Helsinki	Sim Iness; United States	Adolfo Consolini; Italy	James Dillion; United States
1956 Melbourne	Al Oerter; United States	Fortune Gordien; United States	Des Koch; United States
1960 Rome	Al Oerter; United States	Rink Babka; United States	Dick Cochran; United States
1964 Tokyo	Al Oerter; United States	Ludvík Daněk; Czechoslovakia	Dave Weill; United States
1968 Mexico City	Al Oerter; United States	Lothar Milde; East Germany	Ludvík Daněk; Czechoslovakia
1972 Munich	Ludvík Daněk; Czechoslovakia	Jay Silvester; United States	Ricky Bruch; Sweden
1976 Montreal	Mac Wilkins; United States	Wolfgang Schmidt; East Germany	John Powell; United States
1980 Moscow	Viktor Rashchupkin; Soviet Union	Imrich Bugár; Czechoslovakia	Luis Delís; Cuba
1984 Los Angeles	Rolf Danneberg; West Germany	Mac Wilkins; United States	John Powell; United States
1988 Seoul	Jürgen Schult; East Germany	Romas Ubartas; Soviet Union	Rolf Danneberg; West Germany
1992 Barcelona	Romas Ubartas; Lithuania	Jürgen Schult; Germany	Roberto Moya; Cuba
1996 Atlanta	Lars Riedel; Germany	Vladimir Dubrovshchik; Belarus	Vasiliy Kaptyukh; Belarus
2000 Sydney	Virgilijus Alekna; Lithuania	Lars Riedel; Germany	Frantz Kruger; South Africa
2004 Athens	Virgilijus Alekna; Lithuania	Zoltán Kővágó; Hungary	Aleksander Tammert; Estonia
2008 Beijing	Gerd Kanter; Estonia	Piotr Małachowski; Poland	Virgilijus Alekna; Lithuania
2012 London	Robert Harting; Germany	Ehsan Haddadi; Iran	Gerd Kanter; Estonia
2016 Rio de Janeiro	Christoph Harting; Germany	Piotr Małachowski; Poland	Daniel Jasinski; Germany
2020 Tokyo	Daniel Ståhl; Sweden	Simon Pettersson; Sweden	Lukas Weißhaidinger; Austria
2024 Paris	Roje Stona; Jamaica	Mykolas Alekna; Lithuania	Matthew Denny; Australia

==== Multiple medalists ====
Rank	Athlete	Nation	Olympics	Gold	Silver	Bronze	Total
1	Al Oerter	United States	1956–1968	4	0	0	4
2	Virgilijus Alekna	Lithuania	1996–2012	2	0	1	3
3	Martin Sheridan	United States	1904–1908	2	0	0	2
3	Bud Houser	United States	1924–1928	2	0	0	2
5	Ludvík Daněk	Czechoslovakia	1964–1972	1	1	1	3
6	Armas Taipale	Finland	1912–1920	1	1	0	2
6	Adolfo Consolini	Italy	1948–1952	1	1	0	2
6	Mac Wilkins	United States	1976–1984	1	1	0	2
6	Jürgen Schult	East Germany; Germany	1988–1992	1	1	0	2
6	Romas Ubartas	Soviet Union; Lithuania	1988–1992	1	1	0	2
6	Lars Riedel	Germany	1996–2000	1	1	0	2
12	Rolf Danneberg	West Germany	1984–1988	1	0	1	2
12	Gerd Kanter	Estonia	2008–2012	1	0	1	2
14	Piotr Małachowski	Poland	2008–2016	0	2	0	2
15	Fortune Gordien	United States	1948–1956	0	1	1	2
16	John Powell	United States	1976–1984	0	0	2	2

==== Medalists by country ====
Rank	Nation	Gold	Silver	Bronze	Total
1	United States	13	9	13	35
2	Germany	3	2	1	6
3	Lithuania	3	1	1	5
4	Finland	2	3	0	5
5	Czechoslovakia	1	2	1	4
5	Italy	1	2	1	4
7	East Germany	1	2	0	3
8	Sweden	1	1	1	3
9	Hungary	1	1	0	2
9	Soviet Union	1	1	0	2
11	Estonia	1	0	2	3
12	West Germany	1	0	1	2
13	Jamaica	1	0	0	1
14	Poland	0	2	0	2
15	Greece	0	1	2	3
16	Belarus	0	1	1	2
17	Bohemia	0	1	0	1
17	Iran	0	1	0	1
19	Cuba	0	0	2	2
20	France	0	0	1	1
20	South Africa	0	0	1	1
20	Australia	0	0	1	1

=== Women ===
Games	Gold	Silver	Bronze
1928 Amsterdam	Halina Konopacka; Poland	Lillian Copeland; United States	Ruth Svedberg; Sweden
1932 Los Angeles	Lillian Copeland; United States	Ruth Osburn; United States	Jadwiga Wajs; Poland
1936 Berlin	Gisela Mauermayer; Germany	Jadwiga Wajs; Poland	Paula Mollenhauer; Germany
1948 London	Micheline Ostermeyer; France	Edera Gentile; Italy	Jacqueline Mazéas; France
1952 Helsinki	Nina Romashkova; Soviet Union	Yelisaveta Bagriantseva; Soviet Union	Nina Dumbadze; Soviet Union
1956 Melbourne	Olga Fikotová; Czechoslovakia	Irina Beglyakova; Soviet Union	Nina Romashkova; Soviet Union
1960 Rome	Nina Romashkova; Soviet Union	Tamara Press; Soviet Union	Lia Manoliu; Romania
1964 Tokyo	Tamara Press; Soviet Union	Ingrid Lotz; United Team of Germany	Lia Manoliu; Romania
1968 Mexico City	Lia Manoliu; Romania	Liesel Westermann; West Germany	Jolán Kleiber-Kontsek; Hungary
1972 Munich	Faina Melnik; Soviet Union	Argentina Menis; Romania	Vasilka Stoeva; Bulgaria
1976 Montreal	Evelin Schlaak; East Germany	Mariya Vergova; Bulgaria	Gabriele Hinzmann; East Germany
1980 Moscow	Evelin Jahl; East Germany	Mariya Petkova; Bulgaria	Tatyana Lesovaya; Soviet Union
1984 Los Angeles	Ria Stalman; Netherlands	Leslie Deniz; United States	Florența Crăciunescu; Romania
1988 Seoul	Martina Hellmann; East Germany	Diana Gansky; East Germany	Tsvetanka Khristova; Bulgaria
1992 Barcelona	Maritza Martén; Cuba	Tsvetanka Khristova; Bulgaria	Daniela Costian; Australia
1996 Atlanta	Ilke Wyludda; Germany	Natalya Sadova; Russia	Ellina Zvereva; Belarus
2000 Sydney	Ellina Zvereva; Belarus	Anastasia Kelesidou; Greece	Iryna Yatchenko; Belarus
2004 Athens	Natalya Sadova; Russia	Anastasia Kelesidou; Greece	Věra Pospíšilová-Cechlová; Czech Republic
2008 Beijing	Stephanie Brown Trafton; United States	Olena Antonova; Ukraine	Song Aimin; China
2012 London	Sandra Perković; Croatia	Li Yanfeng; China	Yarelys Barrios; Cuba
2016 Rio de Janeiro	Sandra Perković; Croatia	Mélina Robert-Michon; France	Denia Caballero; Cuba
2020 Tokyo	Valarie Allman; United States	Kristin Pudenz; Germany	Yaime Pérez; Cuba
2024 Paris	Valarie Allman; United States	Feng Bin; China	Sandra Elkasević; Croatia

==== Multiple medalists ====
Rank	Athlete	Nation	Olympics	Gold	Silver	Bronze	Total
1	Nina Romashkova	Soviet Union	1952–1960	2	0	1	3
1	Sandra Perković	Croatia	2012–2024	2	0	1	3
3	Evelin Jahl	East Germany	1976–1980	2	0	0	2
3	Valarie Allman	United States	2020–2024	2	0	0	2
5	Lillian Copeland	United States	1928–1932	1	1	0	2
5	Tamara Press	Soviet Union	1960–1964	1	1	0	2
5	Natalya Sadova	Russia	1996–2004	1	1	0	2
8	Lia Manoliu	Romania	1960–1968	1	0	2	3
9	Ellina Zvereva	Belarus	1996–2000	1	0	1	2
10	Mariya Petkova	Bulgaria	1976–1980	0	2	0	2
10	Tamara Press	Soviet Union	1960–1964	1	1	0	2
12	Anastasia Kelesidou	Greece	2000–2004	0	2	0	2
13	Jadwiga Wajs	Poland	1932–1936	0	1	1	2
13	Tsvetanka Khristova	Bulgaria	1988–1992	0	1	1	2
13	Yarelys Barrios	Cuba	2008–2012	0	1	1	2

==== Medalists by country ====
Rank	Nation	Gold	Silver	Bronze	Total
1	Soviet Union	4	3	3	10
2	United States	4	3	0	7
3	East Germany	3	1	1	5
4	Germany^{[nb]}	2	1	1	4
5	Croatia	2	0	1	3
6	Romania	1	1	3	5
7	Cuba	1	1	2	4
8	France	1	1	1	3
8	Poland	1	1	1	3
10	Russia	1	1	0	2
11	Belarus	1	0	2	3
12	Czechoslovakia	1	0	0	1
12	Netherlands	1	0	0	1
14	Bulgaria	0	3	2	5
15	Greece	0	2	0	2
15	China	0	2	0	2
17	Italy	0	1	0	1
17	West Germany	0	1	0	1
19	Australia	0	0	1	1
19	Czech Republic	0	0	1	1
19	Hungary	0	0	1	1
19	Sweden	0	0	1	1
19	Ukraine	0	0	1	1

- ^{nb} The German total includes teams both competing as Germany and the United Team of Germany, but not East or West Germany.

== Intercalated Games ==
The 1906 Intercalated Games were held in Athens and at the time were officially recognised as part of the Olympic Games series, with the intention being to hold a games in Greece in two-year intervals between the internationally held Olympics. However, this plan never came to fruition and the International Olympic Committee (IOC) later decided not to recognise these games as part of the official Olympic series. Some sports historians continue to treat the results of these games as part of the Olympic canon.

Martin Sheridan, the Olympic champion in 1904 and 1908, won the 1906 title as well. A 1904 medallist, Nikolaos Georgantas, was runner-up, while Verner Järvinen took the bronze medal in addition to the Greek-style event gold medal he won at the 1906 Games.

Games	Gold	Silver	Bronze
1906 Athens	Martin Sheridan (USA)	Nikolaos Georgantas (GRE)	Verner Järvinen (FIN)

== Greek-style discus throw ==
At both the 1906 Intercalated Games and the 1908 London Olympics, a Greek-style discus throwing competition was held. This variant had athletes stood on a raised pedestal and throwing the implement in a prescribed technique, which was suggested to emulate the throwing technique of the Ancient Olympic Games. Academics studying ancient Greek artefacts stated that the style was a misinterpretation of a text. Verner Järvinen was the 1906 champion after winning the bronze medal with the standard-style. Martin Sheridan won both Greek-style and regular-style gold medals in 1908.

Games	Gold	Silver	Bronze
1906 Athens	Verner Järvinen (FIN)	Nikolaos Georgantas (GRE)	István Mudin (HUN)
1908 London	Martin Sheridan (USA)	Bill Horr (USA)	Verner Järvinen (FIN)

== Two-handed discus throw ==
At the 1912 Stockholm Olympics a two-handed variant of the standard discus throw competition took place. Each athlete had three attempts using each hand and their score was calculated by adding their best performances for the left and right hands. It featured two rounds, with the top three after the first round receiving a further three attempts with each arm.

All three of the medallists took part in the main Olympic men's discus event and Finland's Armas Taipale emerged as a double gold medallist. Silver medallist Elmer Niklander also won a medal in the two-handed shot put. Third place Emil Magnusson won the only Olympic medal of his career in the event.

Games	Gold	Silver	Bronze
1912 Stockholm	Armas Taipale (FIN)	Elmer Niklander (FIN)	Emil Magnusson (SWE)

== Non-canonical Olympic events ==
In addition to the main 1900 Olympic men's discus throw, a handicap competition was held four days later. Gustaf Söderström, who had placed sixth in the main event, took first place with a throw of 40.50 m, having had a handicap of 5.5 m. Gyula Strausz, 13th in the main discus, was runner-up with 39.49 m off a 6.3 m handicap. Karl Gustaf Staaf, a gold medalist in the tug of war, was third with 38.80 m (8 m handicap)

The handicap event returned at the 1904 Summer Olympics. Martin Sheridan and Ralph Rose repeated their 1–2 placings from the Olympic men's discus and John Biller, fifth in the main event, took third place.

These events are no longer considered part of the official Olympic history of the discus throw or the athletics programme in general. Consequently, medals from these competitions have not been assigned to nations on the all-time medal tables.
