= 1969 European Athletics Championships – Men's discus throw =

Men's discus throw at the European Athletics Championships

The men's discus throw at the 1969 European Athletics Championships was held in Athens, Greece, at Georgios Karaiskakis Stadium on 16 and 18 September 1969.

== Medalists ==
Gold	Hartmut Losch; East Germany
Silver	Ricky Bruch; Sweden
Bronze	Lothar Milde; East Germany

== Results ==
=== Final ===
18 September

Rank	Name	Nationality	Result	Notes
1st place, gold medalist(s)	Hartmut Losch	East Germany	61.82	CR
2nd place, silver medalist(s)	Ricky Bruch	Sweden	61.08	
3rd place, bronze medalist(s)	Lothar Milde	East Germany	59.34	
4	Ludvík Daněk	Czechoslovakia	59.30	
5	Vladimir Lyakhov	Soviet Union	59.10	
6	Ferenc Tégla	Hungary	58.18	
7	Günter Schaumburg	East Germany	57.88	
8	Kaj Andersen	Denmark	56.26	
9	Jaroslav Vidrna	Czechoslovakia	55.70	
10	Géza Fejér	Hungary	55.64	
11	Edy Hubacher	Switzerland	54.12	
12	Edmund Piątkowski	Poland	53.64	
13	Jouko Montonen	Finland	53.46	

=== Qualification ===
16 September

Rank	Name	Nationality	Result	Notes
1	Hartmut Losch	East Germany	59.86	CR Q
2	Ferenc Tégla	Hungary	58.42	Q
3	Lothar Milde	East Germany	58.40	Q
4	Ludvík Daněk	Czechoslovakia	58.14	Q
5	Ricky Bruch	Sweden	58.00	Q
6	Vladimir Lyakhov	Soviet Union	57.66	Q
7	Edmund Piątkowski	Poland	56.70	Q
8	Kaj Andersen	Denmark	55.46	Q
9	Günter Schaumburg	East Germany	55.36	Q
10	Jaroslav Vidrna	Czechoslovakia	54.54	Q
11	Edy Hubacher	Switzerland	53.88	Q
12	Géza Fejér	Hungary	53.44	Q
13	Jouko Montonen	Finland	53.38	Q
14	Bill Tancred	Great Britain	53.30	
15	Zbigniew Gryżboń	Poland	50.70	
16	Erlendur Valdimarsson	Iceland	49.84	
17	János Murányi	Hungary	49.76	
18	Pete Tancred	Great Britain	48.24	
	Pentti Kahma	Finland	NM	
	Nikolaos Tsiaras	Greece	NM	

== Participation ==
According to an unofficial count, 20 athletes from 12 countries participated in the event.

- Czechoslovakia (2)
- Denmark (1)
- East Germany (3)
- Finland (2)
- Greece (1)
- Hungary (3)
- Iceland (1)
- Poland (2)
- Soviet Union (1)
- Sweden (1)
- Switzerland (1)
- Great Britain (2)
