= Athletics at the 1973 Summer Universiade – Men's discus throw =

The men's discus throw event at the 1973 Summer Universiade was held at the Central Lenin Stadium in Moscow on 17 and 18 August.

== Medalists ==
Gold	Silver	Bronze
Viktor Zhurba; Soviet Union	Gunnar Müller; East Germany	Ferenc Tégla; Hungary

== Results ==
=== Qualification ===
Rank	Group	Athlete	Nationality	Result	Notes
1	?	Viktor Zhurba	Soviet Union	58.74	
2	?	Ferenc Tégla	Hungary	57.54	
3	?	Mark Wilkins	United States	57.14	
4	?	Silvano Simeon	Italy	56.94	
5	?	Gunnar Müller	East Germany	56.76	
6	?	Markku Tuokko	Finland	56.34	
7	?	Jim Penrose	United States	55.68	
8	?	Velislav Prokhaska	Bulgaria	55.52	
9	?	Ain Roost	Canada	55.48	
10	?	Igor Spasovkhodskiy	Soviet Union	55.36	
11	?	Frédéric Piette	France	54.88	
12	?	Zdravko Pečar	Yugoslavia	54.66	
13	?	Leszek Gajdziński	Poland	54.64	
14	?	Emil Vladimirov	Bulgaria	53.50	
15	?	Michel Chabrier	France	51.56	
16	?	Thomas Andersson	Finland	49.58	

=== Final ===
Rank	Athlete	Nationality	Result	Notes
1st place, gold medalist(s)	Viktor Zhurba	Soviet Union	61.60	
2nd place, silver medalist(s)	Gunnar Müller	East Germany	59.72	
3rd place, bronze medalist(s)	Ferenc Tégla	Hungary	59.48	
4	Silvano Simeon	Italy	58.20	
5	Markku Tuokko	Finland	58.16	
6	Igor Spasovkhodskiy	Soviet Union	57.80	
7	Zdravko Pečar	Yugoslavia	57.72	
8	Ain Roost	Canada	56.12	
9	Jim Penrose	United States	55.92	
10	Velislav Prokhaska	Bulgaria	55.66	
11	Frédéric Piette	France	55.22	
12	Mark Wilkins	United States	55.20	
