= Men's discus throw world record progression =

List of world records in men's discus

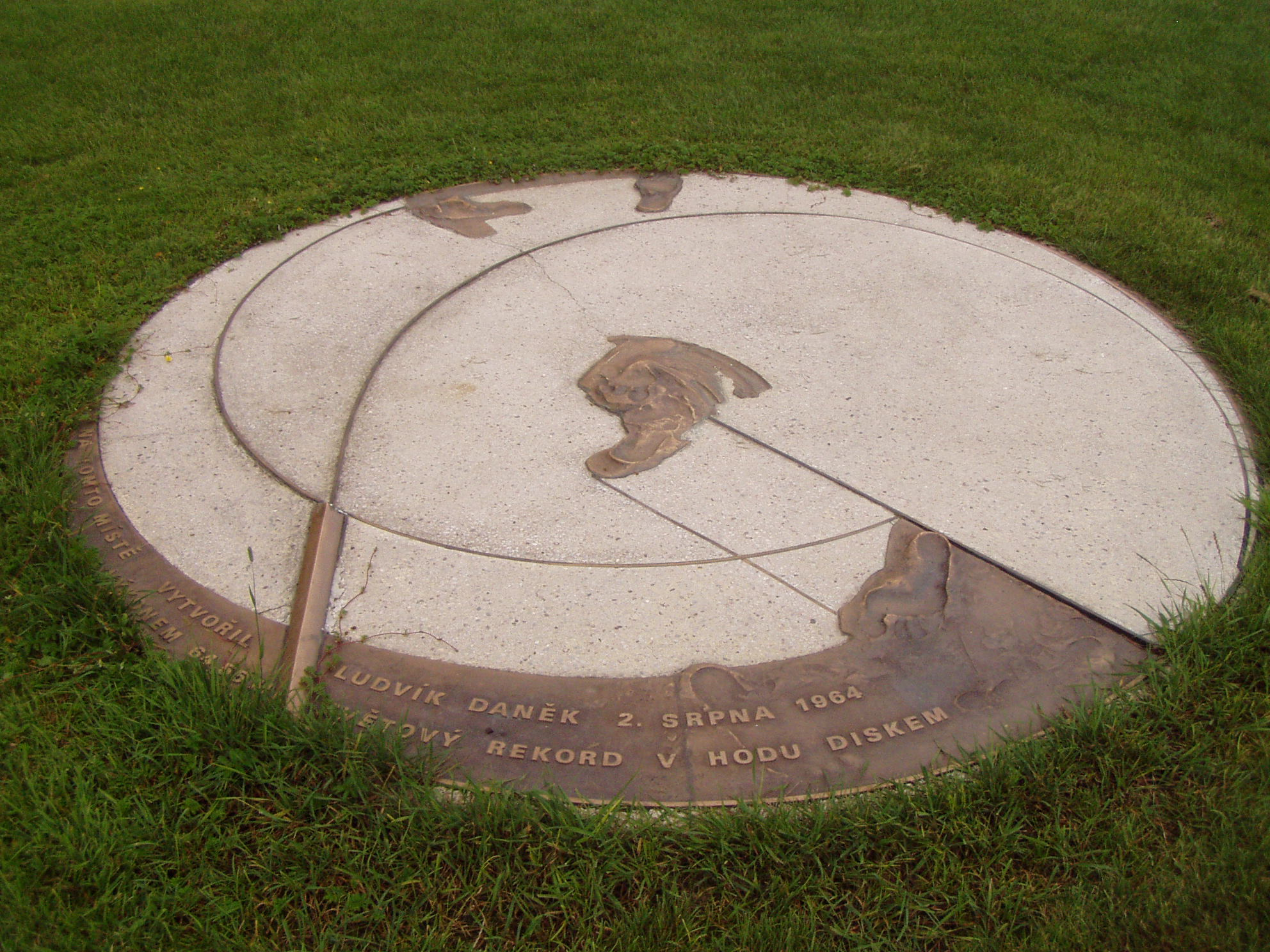
Memorial circle at the Ludvík Daněk Town Stadium in Turnov, Czech Republic. The Czech inscription translates as: "At this spot on August 2, 1964, Ludvík Daněk set world record in discus throw marking 64.55 m."

The first world record in the men's discus throw was recognised by the International Association of Amateur Athletics (IAAF), now known as World Athletics, in 1912, and was set by James Duncan in 1912 (47.58 m).

As of 2025, 42 world records have been ratified by World Athletics in the event. Another 14 are acknowledged but are unofficial, since they were set before the founding of IAAF.

== Outdoor progression ==
Ratified
Not ratified
Ratified but later rescinded
Pending ratification

Mark	Athlete	Date	Location	Ref.
47.58 m (156 ft 1 in)	James Duncan (USA)	27 May 1912	New York City	
47.61 m (156 ft 2 1/4 in)	Thomas Lieb (USA)	14 September 1924	Chicago	
47.89 m (157 ft 1 1/4 in)	Glenn Hartranft (USA)	2 May 1925	San Francisco	
48.20 m (158 ft 1 1/2 in)	Bud Houser (USA)	3 April 1926	Palo Alto	
49.90 m (163 ft 8 1/2 in)	Eric Krenz (USA)	9 March 1929	Palo Alto	
51.03 m (167 ft 5 in)	Eric Krenz (USA)	17 May 1930	Palo Alto	
51.73 m (169 ft 8 1/2 in)	Paul Jessup (USA)	23 August 1930	Pittsburgh	
52.42 m (171 ft 11 3/4 in)	Harald Andersson (SWE)	25 August 1934	Oslo	
53.10 m (174 ft 2 1/2 in)	Willy Schröder (GER)	28 April 1935	Magdeburg	
53.26 m (174 ft 8 3/4 in)	Archie Harris (USA)	20 June 1941	Palo Alto	
53.34 m (175 ft 0 in)	Adolfo Consolini (ITA)	26 October 1941	Milan	
54.23 m (177 ft 11 in)	Adolfo Consolini (ITA)	14 April 1946	Milan	
54.93 m (180 ft 2 1/2 in)	Bob Fitch (USA)	8 June 1946	Minneapolis	
55.33 m (181 ft 6 1/4 in)	Adolfo Consolini (ITA)	10 October 1948	Milan	
56.46 m (185 ft 2 3/4 in)	Fortune Gordien (USA)	9 July 1949	Lisbon	
56.97 m (186 ft 10 3/4 in)	Fortune Gordien (USA)	14 August 1949	Hämeenlinna	
57.93 m (190 ft 1/2 in)	Sim Iness (USA)	20 June 1953	Lincoln	
58.10 m (190 ft 7 1/4 in)	Fortune Gordien (USA)	11 July 1953	Pasadena	
59.28 m (194 ft 5 3/4 in)	Fortune Gordien (USA)	22 August 1953	Pasadena	
59.91 m (196 ft 6 1/2 in)	Edmund Piątkowski (POL)	14 June 1959	Warsaw	
59.91 m (196 ft 6 1/2 in)	Rink Babka (USA)	12 August 1960	Walnut	
60.56 m (198 ft 8 1/4 in)	Jay Silvester (USA)	11 August 1961	Frankfurt, West Germany	
60.72 m (199 ft 2 1/2 in)	Jay Silvester (USA)	20 August 1961	Brussels, Belgium	
61.10 m (200 ft 5 1/2 in)	Al Oerter (USA)	18 May 1962	Los Angeles	
61.64 m (202 ft 2 3/4 in)	Vladimir Trusenyev (USSR)	4 June 1962	Leningrad, USSR	
62.45 m (204 ft 10 1/2 in)	Al Oerter (USA)	1 July 1962	Chicago	
62.62 m (205 ft 5 1/4 in)	Al Oerter (USA)	27 April 1963	Walnut	
62.94 m (206 ft 5 3/4 in)	Al Oerter (USA)	25 April 1964	Walnut	
64.55 m (211 ft 9 1/4 in)	Ludvik Danek (TCH)	2 August 1964	Turnov, Czechoslovakia	
65.22 m (213 ft 11 1/2 in)	Ludvik Danek (TCH)	12 October 1965	Sokolov, Czechoslovakia	
66.54 m (218 ft 3 1/2 in)	Jay Silvester (USA)	25 May 1968	Modesto	
68.40 m (224 ft 4 3/4 in) A	Jay Silvester (USA)	18 September 1968	Reno	
68.40 m (224 ft 4 3/4 in)	Ricky Bruch (SWE)	5 July 1972	Stockholm	
68.48 m (224 ft 8 in)	John van Reenen (RSA)	14 March 1975	Stellenbosch	
69.08 m (226 ft 7 1/2 in)	John Powell (USA)	3 May 1975	Long Beach	
69.18 m (226 ft 11 1/2 in)	Mac Wilkins (USA)	24 April 1976	Walnut	
69.80 m (229 ft 0 in)	Mac Wilkins (USA)	1 May 1976	San Jose	
70.24 m (230 ft 5 1/4 in)	Mac Wilkins (USA)	1 May 1976	San Jose	
70.86 m (232 ft 5 3/4 in)	Mac Wilkins (USA)	1 May 1976	San Jose	
71.16 m (233 ft 5 1/2 in)	Wolfgang Schmidt (GDR)	9 August 1978	Berlin	
71.86 m (235 ft 9 in)	Yuriy Dumchev (USSR)	29 May 1983	Moscow	
74.08 m (243 ft 1/2 in)	Jürgen Schult (GDR)	6 June 1986	Neubrandenburg, East Germany	
74.35 m (243 ft 11 in)	Mykolas Alekna (LTU)	14 April 2024	Ramona	
74.89 m (245 ft 8 1/4 in)	Mykolas Alekna (LTU)	13 April 2025	Ramona	
75.56 m (247 ft 10 3/4 in)	Mykolas Alekna (LTU)	13 April 2025	Ramona	

On 7 July 1981, Ben Plucknett of the United States won a meet in Stockholm with a world record throw of 72.34 m (237 ft 4 in), but the record was nullified by the I.A.A.F. one week later when they announced that Plucknett had tested positive for the banned anabolic steroid nortestosterone.

On 13 April 2025, Mykolas Alekna broke his own world record of 74.35 m from the previous year twice, throwing 74.89 and 75.56 m. At the same event, Australian Matthew Denny also threw 74.78 m (245 ft 4 in), in excess of the old world record. However, Alekna by that point had already surpassed that mark.

== Indoor world best progress ==
Record	Athlete	Date	Meet	Place	Ref.
66.20 m (217 ft 2 1/4 in)	Wolfgang Schmidt (GDR)	9 January 1980		Berlin, Germany	
69.51 m (228 ft 1/2 in)	Gerd Kanter (EST)	22 March 2009	World Record Indoor Challenge	Växjö, Sweden	

== See also ==
- Women's discus throw world record progression
