= Athletics at the 1968 Summer Olympics – Men's discus throw =

Men's discus throw at the Games of the XIX Olympiad
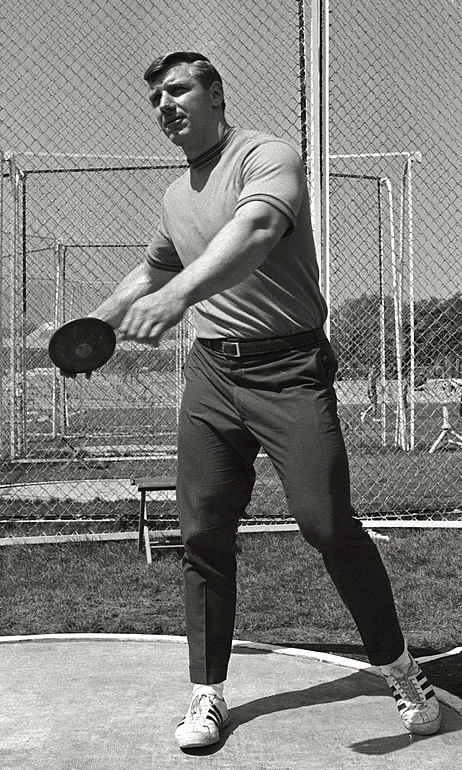
- Al Oerter
- Venue: Estadio Olímpico Universitario
- Dates: October 14–15, 1968
- Competitors: 27 from 19 nations
- Winning distance: 64.78 OR

Medalists
1st place, gold medalist(s)		Al Oerter; United States
2nd place, silver medalist(s)		Lothar Milde; East Germany
3rd place, bronze medalist(s)		Ludvík Daněk; Czechoslovakia

The men's discus throw competition at the 1968 Summer Olympics in Mexico City, Mexico took place on October 14–15. Twenty-seven athletes from 19 nations competed. The maximum number of athletes per nation had been set at 3 since the 1930 Olympic Congress. The event was won by Al Oerter of the United States, the nation's fifth consecutive and 12th overall victory in the men's discus throw. Oerter finished his run of four victories in the event, the first person to win four consecutive gold medals in any individual Olympic event (Carl Lewis in the long jump and Michael Phelps in the 200 metre individual medley swimming did so later; Paul Elvstrøm had won previously four individual gold medals in sailing but had been forced to switch events when the programme changed, and Kaori Icho would later win four individual gold medals in wrestling but changed weight classes during her run). For the first time during Oerter's reign, he was the only American on the podium as Lothar Milde of East Germany (the first men's discus throw medal for any German athlete) and Ludvík Daněk of Czechoslovakia took the other two medals. Daněk was the seventh man to win at least two discus throw medals; Oerter remains the only one to win four.

== Background ==
This was the 16th appearance of the event, which is one of 12 athletics events to have been held at every Summer Olympics. Returning finalists from the 1964 Games were three-time gold medalist Al Oerter of the United States, silver medalist Ludvik Danek of Czechoslovakia, fourth-place finisher Jay Silvester of the United States, seventh-place finisher Edmund Piatkowski of Poland, and eleventh-place finisher Hartmut Losch of the United Team of Germany (now representing East Germany). Silvester had taken the world record from Danek earlier in the year, and (as in 1964) defeated Oerter in the U.S. Olympic trials. He was the favorite, expected to dethrone Oerter.

Cuba, El Salvador, Mali, and Nicaragua each made their debut in the men's discus throw; East and West Germany competed separately for the first time. The United States made its 16th appearance, having competed in every edition of the Olympic men's discus throw to date.

== Competition format ==
The competition consisted of two rounds, qualification and final. Each athlete received three throws in the qualifying round. All who achieve the qualifying distance of 58.00 metres progressed to the final. If fewer than twelve athletes achieved this mark, then the twelve furthest throwing athletes reached the final. Each finalist was allowed three throws in the last round, with the top eight athletes after that point being given three further attempts.

== Records ==
Prior to the competition, the existing world and Olympic records were as follows.

World record	Jay Silvester (USA)	68.40	Reno, United States	18 September 1968
Olympic record	Al Oerter (USA)	61.00	Tokyo, Japan	15 October 1964

Jay Silvester broke the Olympic record in the qualifying round, throwing 63.34 metres. The top five men in the final also surpassed the old record, but only one—not Silvester—beat the new record. Al Oerter once again won with an Olympic record performance, breaking 64 metres three times in the final: 64.78 metres in the third throw, 64.74 metres in the fifth, and 64.04 metres in the sixth.

== Schedule ==
All times are Central Standard Time (UTC-6)

Date	Time	Round
Monday, 14 October 1968	10:00	Qualifying
Tuesday, 15 October 1968	15:00	Final

== Results ==
=== Qualifying round ===
Qual. rule: qualification standard 58.00m (Q) or at least best 12 qualified (q).

Rank	Group	Athlete	Nation	1	2	3	Distance	Notes
1	A	Jay Silvester	United States	63.34 OR	–	–	63.34	Q, OR
2	A	Hartmut Losch	East Germany	60.40	–	–	60.40	Q
3	A	Gary Carlsen	United States	60.36	–	–	60.36	Q
3	A	Lothar Milde	East Germany	60.36	–	–	60.36	Q
5	A	Günter Schaumburg	East Germany	60.14	–	–	60.14	Q
6	A	Al Oerter	United States	59.36	–	–	59.36	Q
7	A	Ludvík Daněk	Czechoslovakia	59.36	58.10	56.42	59.36	Q
8	A	Ricky Bruch	Sweden	59.08	–	–	59.08	Q
9	B	Robin Tait	New Zealand	58.88	–	–	58.88	Q
10	A	Hein-Direck Neu	West Germany	X	55.26	58.56	58.56	
11	A	Ferenc Tégla	Hungary	57.18	58.50	–	58.50	Q
12	A	Edmund Piątkowski	Poland	58.24	–	–	58.24	Q
13	A	Guram Gudashvili	Soviet Union	57.48	55.84	X	57.48	
14	A	George Puce	Canada	57.34	X	X	57.34	
15	B	Namakoro Niaré	Mali	X	54.92	56.60	56.60	
16	B	János Faragó	Hungary	54.98	56.00	X	56.00	
17	B	Denis Ségui Kragbé	Ivory Coast	55.24	54.24	X	55.24	
18	B	Lech Gajdziński	Poland	54.92	X	X	54.92	
19	A	Jens Reimers	West Germany	53.18	X	54.02	54.02	
20	B	Joe Kashmiri	Iran	53.00	53.96	53.30	53.96	
21	B	Klaus-Peter Hennig	West Germany	53.80	X	X	53.80	
22	B	Heimo Reinitzer	Austria	51.90	52.00	53.52	53.52	
23	B	Modesto Mederos	Cuba	52.30	X	49.42	52.30	
24	B	Bill Tancred	Great Britain	X	48.86	51.74	51.74	
25	B	Edy Hubacher	Switzerland	X	49.80	51.70	51.70	
26	B	Rolando Mendoza	Nicaragua	39.62	36.46	38.78	39.62	
27	B	Mauricio Jubis	El Salvador	33.62	35.94	36.18	36.18	
—	B	Lahcen Samsam Akka	Morocco	DNS				
—	B	Praveen Kumar Sobti	India	DNS				
—	A	Silvano Simeon	Italy	DNS				
—	B	Nashatar Singh Sidhu	Malaysia	DNS				

=== Final ===
Silvester's qualifying round distance of 63.34 did not count for the final, otherwise it would have given him the silver medal. Instead, his best result in the final was 61.78 metres, good only for fifth place. Oerter won for the fourth consecutive Games, beating Lothar Milde by 1.70 metres.

Rank	Athlete	Nation	1	2	3	4	5	6	Distance	Notes
1st place, gold medalist(s)	Al Oerter	United States	61.78	X	64.78 OR	62.42	64.74	64.04	64.78	OR
2nd place, silver medalist(s)	Lothar Milde	East Germany	62.44	63.08	62.58	59.98	60.24	58.00	63.08	
3rd place, bronze medalist(s)	Ludvík Daněk	Czechoslovakia	60.62	X	62.92	X	61.28	61.34	62.92	
4	Hartmut Losch	East Germany	62.12	61.68	60.34	59.48	58.94	59.50	62.12	
5	Jay Silvester	United States	61.10	61.78	X	X	X	60.44	61.78	
6	Gary Carlsen	United States	58.62	59.26	59.46	59.30	52.60	58.54	59.46	
7	Edmund Piątkowski	Poland	59.40	58.46	57.66	57.52	X	58.72	59.40	
8	Ricky Bruch	Sweden	58.94	58.02	58.12	59.28	58.50	58.34	59.28	
9	Hein-Direck Neu	West Germany	55.96	X	58.66	Did not advance			58.66	
10	Günter Schaumburg	East Germany	56.64	57.70	58.62	Did not advance			58.62	
11	Ferenc Tégla	Hungary	56.74	58.36	57.78	Did not advance			58.36	
12	Robin Tait	New Zealand	56.52	57.68	56.84	Did not advance			57.68	
