= Masters M45 discus world record progression =

Masters M45 discus world record progression is the progression of world record improvements of the discus M45 division of Masters athletics. Records must be set in properly conducted, official competitions under the standing IAAF rules unless modified by World Masters Athletics. The M45 division consists of male athletes who have reached the age of 45 but have not yet reached the age of 50, so exactly from their 45th birthday to the day before their 50th birthday. The M45 division throws exactly the same 2 kg implement as the Open division. These competitors all threw their records in open competition.

Key

Incomplete information Pending

Distance	Athlete	Nationality	Birthdate	Location	Date
67.90	Al Oerter	United States	19.09.1936	Long Branch	12.11.1983
66.12	Al Oerter	United States	19.09.1936	Westfield	28.03.1983
58.68	Ludvik Danek	Czechoslovakia	06.01.1937	Prague	08.09.1982
50.25	Kauko Jouppilla	Finland	03.03.1921	Kajaani	09.07.1969
48.97	Adolfo Consolini	Italy	05.01.1917	Lugano	01.06.1965
