= Masters M40 discus world record progression =

Masters M40 discus world record progression is the progression of world record improvements of the discus M40 division of Masters athletics. Records must be set in properly conducted, official competitions under the standing IAAF rules unless modified by World Masters Athletics. The M40 division consists of male athletes who have reached the age of 40 but have not yet reached the age of 45, so exactly from their 35th birthday to the day before their 45th birthday. The M40 division throws exactly the same 2 kg implement as the Open division. These competitors all threw their records in open competition.

Key

Incomplete information Pending

Distance	Athlete	Nationality	Birthdate	Location	Date
70.28	Virgilijus Alekna	Lithuania	13.02.1972	Klaipėda	23.06.2012
69.46	Al Oerter	United States	19.09.1936	Wichita	31.05.1980
68.18	Al Oerter	United States	19.09.1936	Wichita	31.05.1980
67.46	Al Oerter	United States	19.09.1936	Scotch Plains	08.12.1979
67.00	Al Oerter	United States	19.09.1936	Westfield	07.04.1979
65.40	Vladimir Lyakhov	Soviet Union	17.06.1937	Viimsi	24.08.1977
64.76	Ludvík Daněk	Czechoslovakia	06.01.1937	Munich	17.05.1977
55.91	Adolfo Consolini	Italy	05.01.1917	Athens	20.05.1958
