= Norbert Thiede =

East German discus thrower

Personal information
- Nationality: East German
- Born: 3 April 1949 (age 77) Perleberg, Soviet occupation zone in Germany
- Height: 196 cm (6 ft 5 in)
- Weight: 115 kg (254 lb)

Sport
- Country: East Germany
- Sport: Discus throw

Achievements and titles
- Personal best: 66.90

Norbert Thiede is an East German former Olympic discus thrower. He represented his country in the men's discus throw at the 1976 Summer Olympics. His distance was a 61.14 in the qualifiers, and a 64.30 in the finals.

At the East German championships, he won silver in 1975 and 1976, both times beehind Wolfgang Schmidt. He represented the club SC Traktor Schwerin.
