= Zhurba =

Zhurba is a surname. Notable people with the surname include:

- Serhiy Zhurba (born 1987), Ukrainian futsal player
- Viktor Zhurba (born 1950), Russian discus thrower
