= Ibrahima Guèye =

Senegalese athletics competitor

Personal information
- Nationality: Senegalese
- Born: 7 September 1941 (age 84)

Sport
- Sport: Athletics
- Event: Discus throw

Ibrahima Guèye (born 7 September 1941) is a Senegalese athlete. He competed in the men's discus throw at the 1976 Summer Olympics.
