= Guram Gudashvili =

Georgian discus thrower

Personal information
- Nationality: Georgian
- Born: 28 December 1941 (age 84)

Sport
- Sport: Athletics
- Event: Discus throw

Guram Gudashvili (born 28 December 1941) is a Georgian athlete. He competed in the men's discus throw at the 1968 Summer Olympics, representing the Soviet Union.
