= 1979 Military Friendship Athletics Championships =

The 1979 Military Friendship Athletics Championships was an international men's outdoor track and field competition between military athletes from states of the Eastern Bloc, including the Soviet Union, East Germany, Poland, Bulgaria, Czechoslovakia, Romania and Cuba. The competition was held in Potsdam, East Germany from 30 August to 1 September.

Poland's Marian Woronin claimed a sprint double in the 100 metres and 200 metres while East Germany's Jürgen Straub did the middle-distance equivalent in the 800 metres and 1500 metres. The most prominent athlete at the competition was the reigning 1976 Olympic hammer throw champion Yuriy Sedykh, who comfortably won his event by several metres. East German Ronald Weigel's win in the 20 kilometres race walk was also a standout performance, as the future world champion finished over two minutes ahead of his rivals.

== Results ==
Event	Gold		Silver		Bronze	
100 metres	Marian Woronin (POL)	10.38	Klaus-Dieter Kurrat (GDR)	10.46	Roman Lacko (TCH)	10.35
200 metres	Marian Woronin (POL)	20.87	Zenon Licznerski (POL)	20.97	Klaus Thiele (GDR)	21.09
400 metres	Ryszard Podlas (POL)	46.37	Nartsis Popov (BUL)	46.65	Frank Schaffer (GDR)	46.79
800 metres	Jürgen Straub (GDR)	1:46.9	Josef Vedra (TCH)	1:47.8	Vladimir Ponomaryov (URS)	1:48.0
1500 metres	Jürgen Straub (GDR)	3:33.7	Sergey Chirkov (URS)	3:37.4	Jozef Plachý (TCH)	3:37.6
5000 metres	Daniel Jańczuk (POL)	13:45.1	Vladimir Lisovskiy (URS)	13:46.4	Jozef Lenčéš (TCH)	13:50.7
10,000 metres	Valeriy Sapon (URS)	28:37.1	Klaus-Dieter Schiemenz (GDR)	28:41.4	Bogusław Kuś (POL)	29:38.0
110 m hurdles	Vasko Nedyalkov (BUL)	13.96	Július Ivan (TCH)	14.04	Vyacheslav Naidyenko (URS)	14.05
400 m hurdles	Oleg Bulatkin (URS)	50.56	Dmitry Stukalov (URS)	50.99	Yanko Bratanov (BUL)	51.07
3000 m s'chase	Bogusław Mamiński (POL)	8:31.1	Vladimir Lisovskiy (URS)	8:31.9	Piotr Zgarda (POL)	8:33.7
4 × 100 m relay	Poland (POL); Ryszard Sadkowski; Zenon Licznerski; Mirosław Kobielski; Marian Woronin	40.10	Czechoslovakia (TCH); Vardas; Zdenek Mazur; Ladislav Latocha; Roman Lacko	40.50	East Germany (GDR); Ingo Voge; Christian Neubert; Uwe Barucha; Klaus-Dieter Kurrat	40.52
4 × 400 m relay	Poland (POL); Jerzy Włodarczyk; Ryszard Podlas; Andrzej Stępień; Jerzy Konarski	3:08.51	East Germany (GDR); Klaus Thiele; Frank Lehmann; Klaus Hauck; Frank Schaffer	3:09.55	Soviet Union (URS); Vladimir Konovalov; Oleg Bulatkin; Valeriy Mashkovskiy; Dmitry Stukalov	3:09.91
20 km walk	Ronald Weigel (GDR)	1:28:29.4	Maris Peterson (URS)	1:30:31.9	Stefan Petrix (TCH)	1:32:31.2
High jump	Adrian Proteasa (ROM)	2.19	Jarosław Gwóźdź (POL)	2.19	Daniel Albu (ROM)	2.13
Pole vault	Mariusz Klimczyk (POL)	5.45	Aleksandr Dolgov (URS)	5.30	Atanas Tarev (BUL)	5.30
Long jump	Jan Leitner (TCH)	7.78	Kazimir Vilkanov (BUL)	7.69	Ramón Díaz Rodríguez (CUB)	7.66
Triple jump	Anatoliy Piskulin (URS)	16.84	Adrian Ghioroaie (ROM)	16.25	Karel Hradil (TCH)	16.17
Shot put	Jaroslav Brabec (TCH)	19.71	Mikhail Kyoshev (BUL)	19.61	Andrzej Bembnista (POL)	19.02
Discus throw	Velko Velev (BUL)	63.92	Stanisław Wołodko (POL)	60.68	Iosif Naghi (ROM)	59.90
Hammer throw	Yuriy Sedykh (URS)	75.24	Igor Nikulin (URS)	70.92	František Vrbka (TCH)	69.24
Javelin throw	Aleksandr Zaytsev (URS)	80.44	Tomáš Babiak (TCH)	78.64	Czesław Uhl (POL)	78.62
Decathlon	Vladimir Buryakov (URS)	7898 pts	Wolfgang Linder (GDR)	7739 pts	Luděk Pernica (TCH)	7223 pts
