= Hanka Durante =

German volleyball player (born 1976)

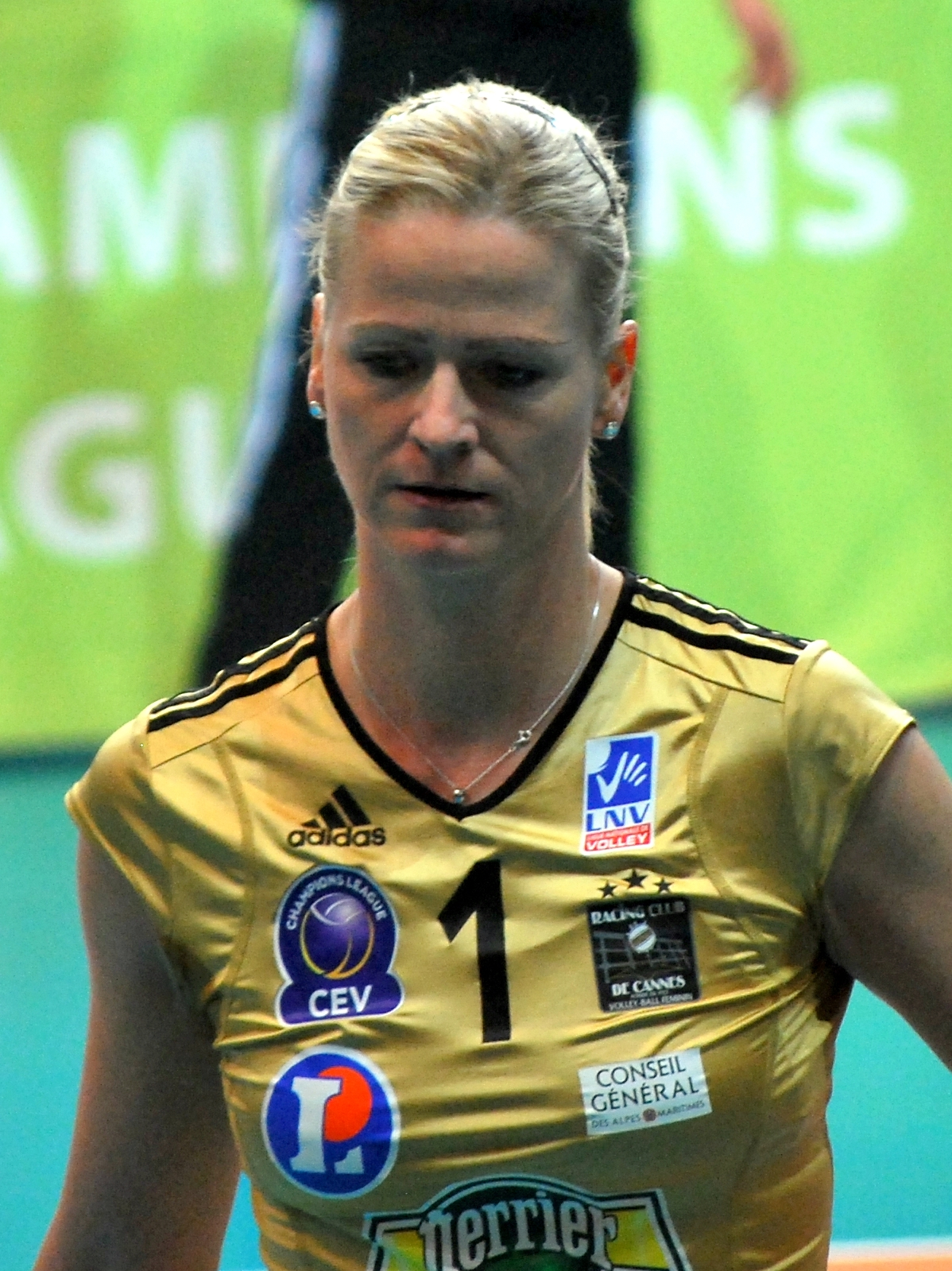
- Pachale2 in 2011

Personal information
- Nationality: German
- Born: Hanka Pachale; 12 September 1976 (age 50); Schwerin, East Germany

Career
Teams
	Schweriner SC, Schwerin (GER); Volley Modena, Modena (ITA)
Honours
Women's volleyball
Representing Germany
European Championship
Bronze medal – third place	2003 Ankara	Team competition

Hanka Pachale-Durante (born 12 September 1976) is a German volleyball player; she played for the German Women's National Team, representing them in consecutive Summer Olympics, starting in 1996. She represented her native country in at the 2004 Summer Olympics, finishing in ninth place, and at the 2003 Women's European Volleyball Championship, finishing third. For the 2009–10 season, she played for Italian club Pavia.

Her father Siegfried Pachale was a discus thrower, placing fifth in the world while representing East Germany in the 1976 Summer Olympics in Montreal, Quebec, Canada. Her mother was also an internationally successful athlete, throwing the discus for the German national team.

== Honours ==
- 1996 Olympic Games — 8th place
- 1998 World Championship — 13th place
- 2000 Olympic Games — 6th place
- 2001 European Championship — 9th place
- 2003 European Championship — 3rd place
- 2004 Olympic Games — 9th place
- 2005 FIVB World Grand Prix — 10th place
- 2005 European Championship — 11th place
- 2006 World Championship — 11th place
- 2007 European Championship — 6th place

== Sources ==
- Evans, Hilary; Gjerde, Arild; Heijmans, Jeroen; Mallon, Bill; et al. "Hanka Pachale". Olympics at Sports-Reference.com. Sports Reference LLC. Archived from the original on 17 April 2020.
