= Mac Wilkins =

American athletics competitor (born 1950)

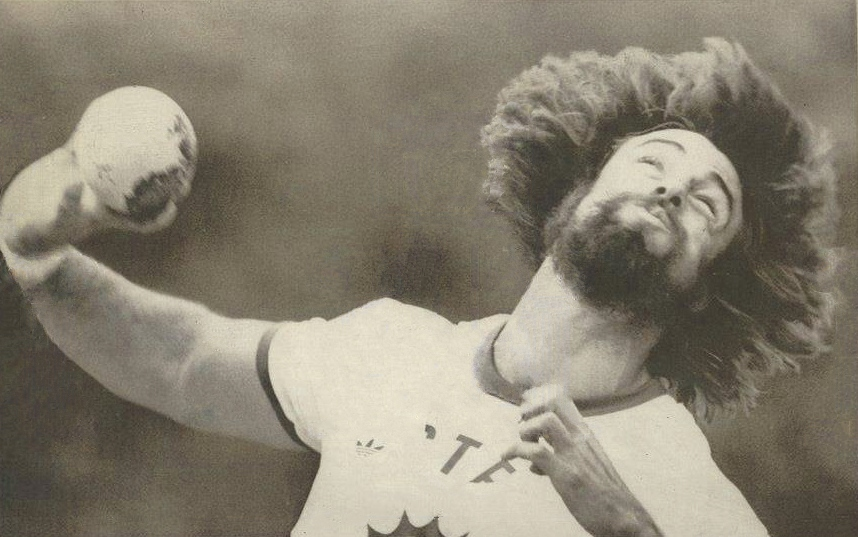
- Wilkins in 1976

Personal information
- Full name: Mac Maurice Wilkins
- Nationality: American
- Born: November 15, 1950 (age 75) Eugene, Oregon, U.S.
- Height: 1.93 m (6 ft 4 in)
- Weight: 115 kg (254 lb)

Sport
- Country: United States
- Sport: athletics
- Events: Discus throw, shot put, hammer throw, javelin throw
- Club: Pacific Coast Club, Long Beach; Athletics West, Eugene; Oregon Ducks, Eugene

Achievements and titles
- Personal bests: DT – 70.98 m (1980); SP – 21.06 m (1977); HT – 63.65 m (1977); JT – 78.43 m (1970)
Medal record
Representing the United States
Olympic Games
Gold medal – first place	1976 Montreal	Discus throw
Silver medal – second place	1984 Los Angeles	Discus throw
Pan American Games
Gold medal – first place	1979 San Juan	Discus throw

Mac Maurice Wilkins (born November 15, 1950) is an American athlete who competed mainly in the discus throw. He was born in Eugene, Oregon and graduated in 1969 from Beaverton High School in Beaverton, Oregon.

== College ==
Distance running coach Bill Bowerman recruited Wilkins to the University of Oregon, where he threw the javelin 257 ft 8 in (78.54 m) as a 19-year-old freshman. As a senior, he was an NCAA champion in the discus and won the first of eight U.S. national championships in the discus. He was inducted into the Oregon Sports Hall of Fame in 1994.

== Olympics ==
Wilkins competed for the United States in the 1976 Summer Olympics in Montreal, Quebec, Canada, in the discus throw, where he won the gold medal with a distance of 221' 5" to defeat Wolfgang Schmidt of East Germany by four feet. Wilkins qualified for the 1980 U.S. Olympic team but did not compete due to the 1980 Summer Olympics boycott. However, he received one of 461 Congressional Gold Medals created especially for the spurned athletes.

Wilkins won a silver medal in the discus throw at the 1984 Summer Olympics in Los Angeles. He placed 5th in the 1988 Olympic Games in Seoul, South Korea.

== World records ==
Wilkins broke the world record four times in his career. During his discus throw series on May 1, 1976, in San Jose, California, he set the world record three times with consecutive throws of 69.80 m, 70.24 m, and 70.86 m. In 1976 and 1980, Wilkins was ranked #1 worldwide in the discus throw. In 1977, he was the indoor national champion in the shot put, with a throw of 69 ft 1.5 in (21.069 m).

== Coaching ==
From 2006 through 2013, Wilkins was the throws coach at Concordia University, an NAIA school in Portland, Oregon. His throwers won 26 individual national championships and earned 94 All-American honors. When Al Oerter died on October 1, 2007, Wilkins became the earliest surviving Olympic champion in the men's discus. He is not the oldest; Viktor Rashchupkin—the 1980 champion—is almost a month older. In August 2013, Wilkins left Concordia University to coach for USA Track & Field in Chula Vista, California.

Records
Preceded by John Powell	Men's discus world record holder April 24, 1976 – August 9, 1978	Succeeded by Wolfgang Schmidt
