= Stanisław Wołodko =

Polish discus thrower (1950–2021)

Personal information
- Nationality: Polish
- Born: 20 March 1950 Vilnius, Lithuanian SSR, Soviet Union
- Died: 4 February 2021 (aged 70)

Sport
- Sport: Athletics
- Event: Discus throw

Stanisław Wołodko (20 March 1950 – 4 February 2021) was a Polish athlete. He competed in the men's discus throw at the 1976 Summer Olympics.

== International competitions ==
Year	Competition	Venue	Position	Notes
Representing Poland
1968	European Junior Championships	Leipzig, East Germany	10th	42.26 m
1974	European Championships	Rome, Italy	20th (q)	57.24 m
1975	European Cup Final	Helsinki, Finland	6th	59.32 m
1977	European Cup "A" Final	Helsinki, Finland	3rd	61.20 m
1976	Olympics Games	Montreal, Canada	18th (q)	59.42 m
1979	European Cup "A" Final	Turin, Italy	5th	59.70 m
1979	Military Friendship Championships	Potsdam, East Germany	2nd	60.68 m
1981	European Cup "A" Final	Zagreb, Yugoslavia	4th	58.94 m
