= Viktor Rashchupkin =

Soviet-Russian discus thrower

Personal information
- Native name: Виктор Иванович Ращулкин
- Full name: Viktor Ivanovich Raschchupkin
- Nationality: Russian
- Born: October 16, 1950 (age 75) Kamensk-Uralski, Russian SFSR, Soviet Union
- Height: 1.88 m (6 ft 2 in)
- Weight: 107 kg (236 lb)

Sport
- Country: Soviet Union
- Sport: Athletics
- Event: Discus throw

Achievements and titles
- Personal best: 66.64 m (1980)
Medal record
Men's Athletics
Representing Soviet Union
Olympic Games
Gold medal – first place	1980 Moscow	Discus throw

Viktor Ivanovich Rashchupkin (Russian: Виктор Иванович Ращупкин, born October 16, 1950) is a Soviet/Russian athlete who competed mainly in the discus throw. He was born in Kamensk-Uralsky.

He competed for Soviet Union at the 1980 Summer Olympics held in Moscow, Soviet Union where he won the gold medal in the men's discus throw event.

With the death of Al Oerter on 1 October 2007, Rashchupkin is now the oldest surviving Olympic Champion in the Men's Discus. He is almost exactly 1 month older than 1976 Champion, Mac Wilkins.
