= Salman Hesam =

Iranian discus thrower (born 1947)

Personal information
- Nationality: Iranian
- Born: 30 November 1947 (age 78) Bandar-e Pahlavi, Iran

Sport
- Sport: Athletics
- Event: Discus throw
Medal record
Men's athletics
Representing Iran
Asian Games
Bronze medal – third place	1974 Tehran	Discus throw

Salman Hesam (Persian: سلمان حسام; born 30 November 1947) is an Iranian athlete. He competed in the men's discus throw at the 1976 Summer Olympics.
