= Jay Silvester =

American discus thrower

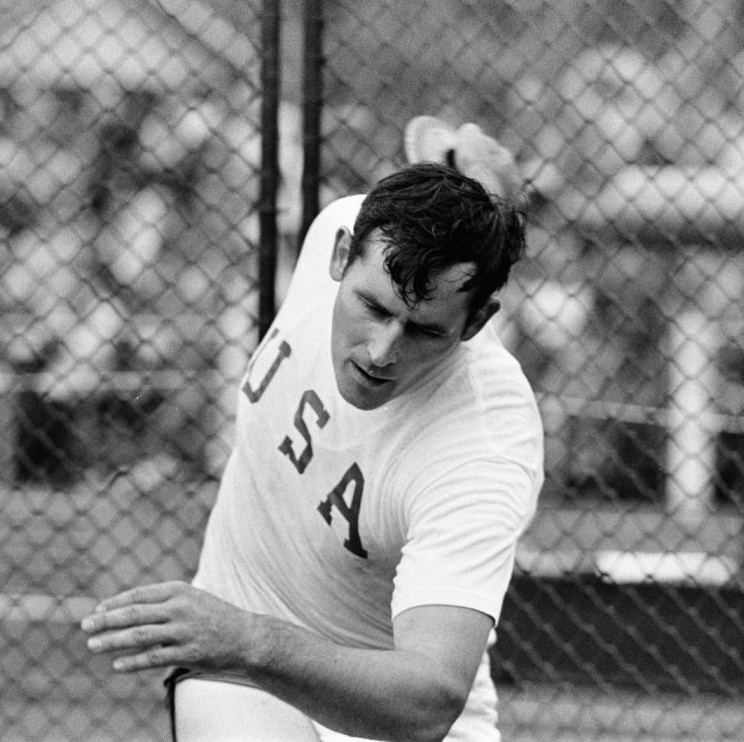
- Silvester in 1970

Personal information
- Full name: L. Jay Silvester
- Born: August 27, 1937 (age 88) Tremonton, Utah, U.S.
- Height: 6 ft 3 in (1.91 m)
- Weight: 251 lb (114 kg)

Sport
- Sport: Discus throw
- Club: Santa Clara Valley Youth Village
Medal record
Men's athletics
Representing the United States
Olympic Games
Silver medal – second place	1972 Munich	Discus throw

L. Jay Silvester (born August 27, 1937) and participated in college athletics at Utah State University from 1956 to 1959 is an American retired athlete who mainly competed in the discus throw. In this event he finished in fourth, fifth, second and eighth place at the 1964, 1968, 1972 and 1976 Summer Olympics, respectively, and won a bronze medal at the 1975 Pan American Games.

During his career, Silvester won five AAU discus titles and set four world records, two in 1961 (60.56 m and 60.72 m) and two in 1968 (66.54 m and 68.40 m). His personal bests were 70.38 m in the discus (1971, unofficial world record) and 20.01 m in the shot put. Silvester also won the British AAA Championships titles in the discus and shot put events at the 1962 AAA Championships.

After retirement, he worked as professor of physical education at Brigham Young University.

Silvester held the M35 Masters American Records for the Shot Put and Discus Throw, and is the current holder of the M70 Masters American Records for the Discus Throw. Silvester won gold medals for the M45 Discus Throw at the 1983 and 1984 Masters National Outdoor Championships.

== Personal life ==
Silvester is a member of the Church of Jesus Christ of Latter-day Saints, and he was their first member to participate in 4 Olympic Games.

Records
Preceded by (United States) Rink Babka	Men's Discus World Record Holder; August 11, 1961 – May 18, 1962	Succeeded by (United States) Al Oerter
Preceded by (Czechoslovakia) Ludvík Daněk	Men's Discus World Record Holder equalled by (Sweden) Ricky Bruch on 1972-07-05; May 25, 1968 – March 14, 1975	Succeeded by (South Africa) John van Reenen
