= Hutisko-Solanec =

- Municipality
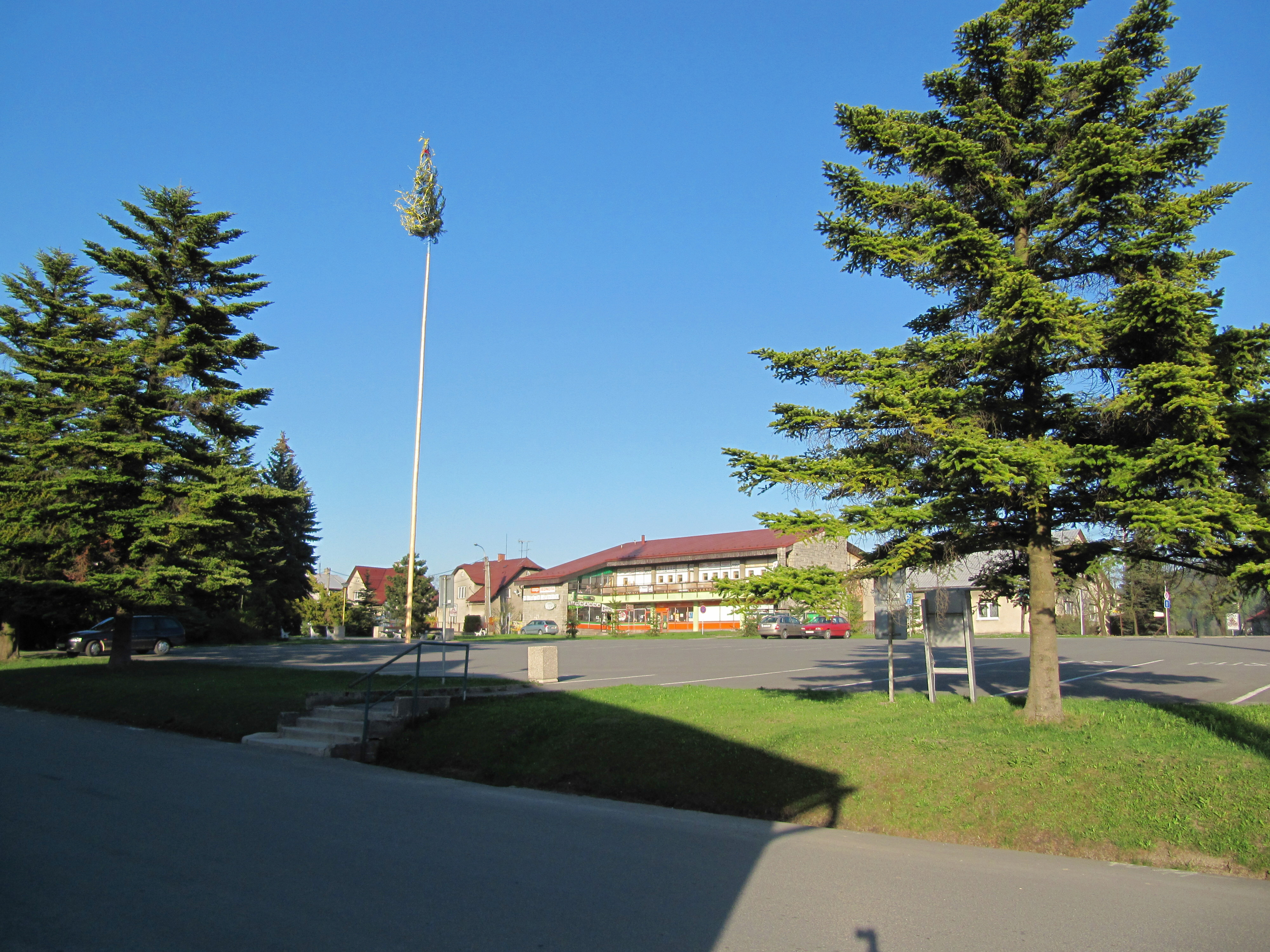
- Square in Hutisko

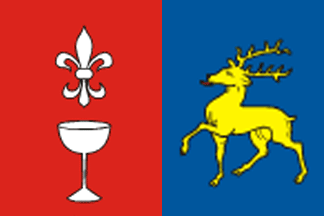
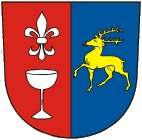
- Flag Coat of arms

- Location in the Czech Republic
- Coordinates: 49°25′51″N 18°12′50″E
- Country: Czech Republic
- Region: Zlín
- District: Vsetín
- Founded: 1656

Area
  - Total: 29.91 km^{2} (11.55 sq mi)
- Elevation: 498 m (1,634 ft)

Population (2026-01-01)
  - Total: 1,947
  - Density: 65.10/km^{2} (168.6/sq mi)
- Time zone: UTC+1 (CET)
  - Summer (DST): UTC+2 (CEST)
- Postal code: 756 62
- Website: www.hutisko-solanec.cz

Hutisko-Solanec is a municipality in Vsetín District in the Zlín Region of the Czech Republic. It has about 1,900 inhabitants.

== Administrative division ==
Hutisko-Solanec consists of two municipal parts (in brackets population according to the 2021 census):

- Hutisko (942)
- Solanec pod Soláněm (987)

== Etymology ==
The name of Hutisko refers to glassworks (hutě), which was founded here in the early 17th century. The settlement of Solanec was named after the nearby Soláň Hill.

== Geography ==
Hutisko-Solanec is located about 18 kilometres (11 mi) northeast of Vsetín and 44 km (27 mi) northeast of Zlín. The northern part of the municipality with Hutisko lies in the Rožnov Furrow valley and the southern part with Solanec pod Soláněm lies in the Moravian-Silesian Beskids. The southern municipal border leads over the peaks of several high mountains, including Tanečnice at 912 m (2,992 ft) above sea level, Leští at 899 m (2,949 ft), and Soláň at 861 m (2,825 ft). The entire municipality lies in the Beskydy Protected Landscape Area.

== History ==
The settlement of Hutisko was founded by Baltazar of Zierotin in 1656. The settlement of Solanec became a municipality in 1657 and Hutisko in 1666. Hutisko and Solanec pod Soláněm were merged into one municipality in 1960.

== Demographics ==
Historical population

Year	Pop.	±%
1869	2,066	—
1880	2,092	+1.3%
1890	2,005	−4.2%
1900	2,151	+7.3%
1910	2,105	−2.1%

Year	Pop.	±%
1921	1,979	−6.0%
1930	2,104	+6.3%
1950	1,788	−15.0%
1961	2,001	+11.9%
1970	1,961	−2.0%

Year	Pop.	±%
1980	1,924	−1.9%
1991	1,897	−1.4%
2001	1,900	+0.2%
2011	1,964	+3.4%
2021	1,929	−1.8%

Source: Censuses

== Transport ==
There are no railways or major roads passing through the municipality.

== Sights ==
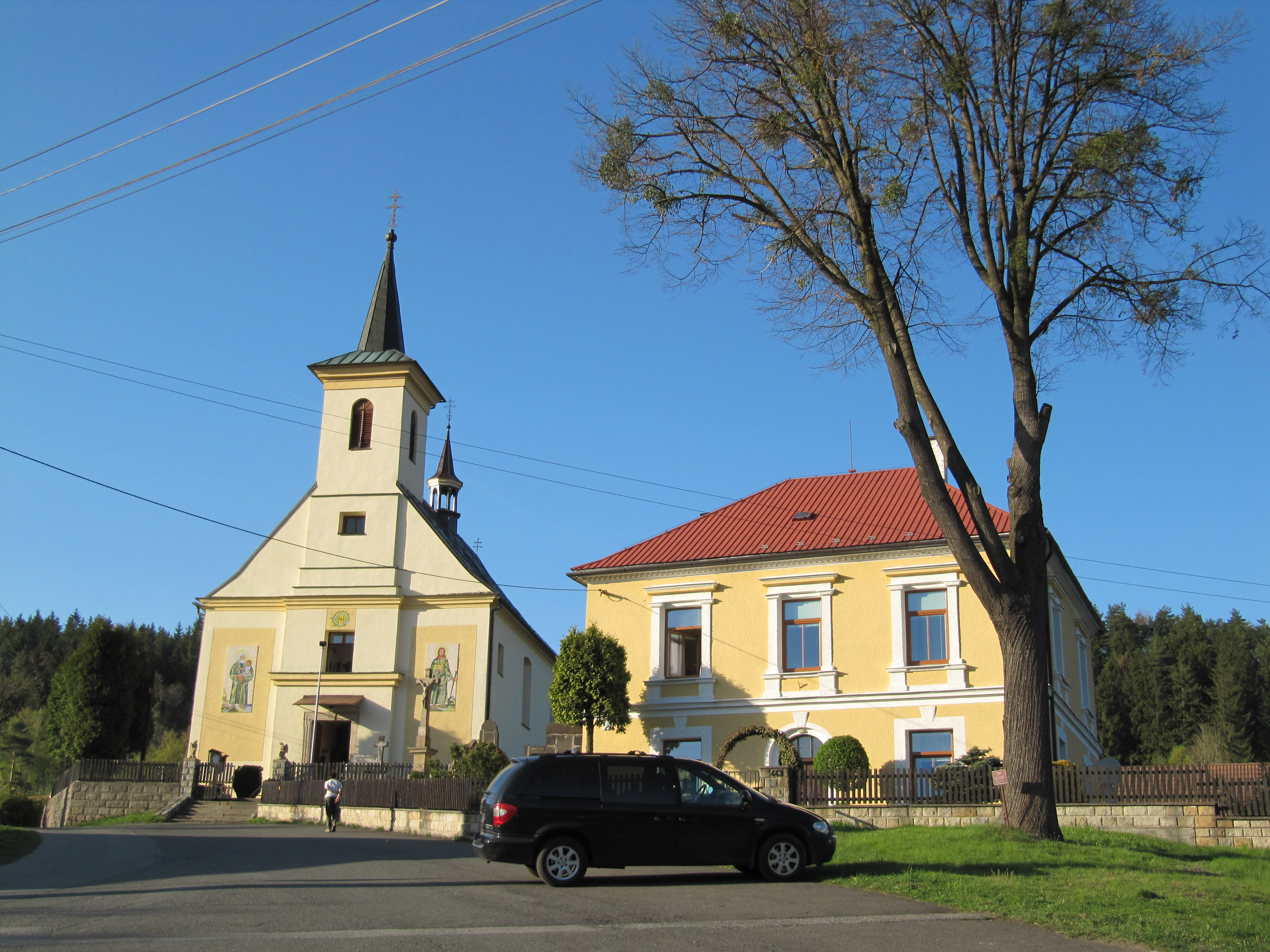
Church of Saint Joseph and rectory

The main landmark of the municipality is the Church of Saint Joseph. It dates from 1748.

A valuable building in Hutisko is fojství ("Vogt's residence"). It is a large wooden house dating from 1785. Today it houses a restaurant.

In the municipality is a monument to Charlotte Garrigue, built in 1926 and initiated by the managing teacher Cyril Mach.

== Twin towns – sister cities ==
Hutisko-Solanec is twinned with:

- Makov, Slovakia
