= John van Reenen =

South African discus thrower and artist

- Born: 26 March 1947; Bethlehem, Free State, South Africa
- Died: 21 August 2018 (aged 71)
- Occupation: Athlete
- Sports career

John van Reenen (26 March 1947 – 21 August 2018) was a South African graphic artist and discus thrower, who was best known for setting the world record in the men's discus event in 1975.

== Biography ==
John van Reenen was born on 26 March 1947 in Bethlehem, Free State, South Africa. As an athlete, his international competitive exposure was limited by the ban on South Africa from international games, imposed due to the apartheid regime at the time. He managed to compete overseas via representing his university Washington State University. Van Reenen studied Fine Art throughout his athletics career, specialising in etchings.

In the 1970 season he twice broke the South African record while competing for WSU, but his major mark was in the spring of 1975, when on 14 March, at a meet in Stellenbosch, he threw 68.48m to set a new world record. He later won the British 3A's championship that year. Ten years on he won the South African national championships in 1985, 1986 and 1987.

Van Reenan became an artist and joined the studio of Jan Vermeiren. He lectured at the University of Stellenbosch his subject matter being Etchings.

Van Reenen was inducted into the South African Sports Hall of Fame in February 2009 for his World Record Discus Throw.

Records
Preceded by (United States) Jay Silvester (Sweden) Ricky Bruch	Men's Discus World Record Holder; 14 March – 3 May 1975	Succeeded by (United States) John Powell
