= Lothar Milde =

East German discus thrower (1934–2026)

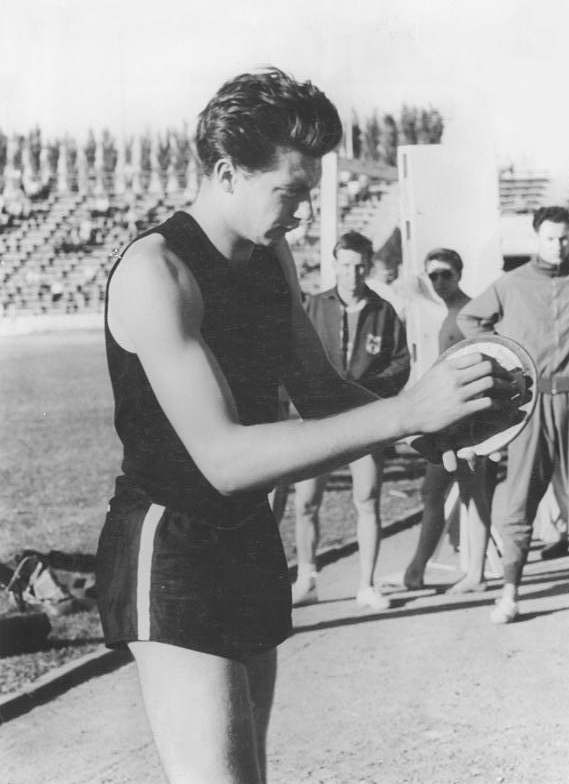
- Lothar Milde in 1959

Personal information
- Born: 8 November 1934 Halle an der Saale, Gau Halle-Merseburg, Germany
- Died: 5 October 2026 (aged 91) Halle an der Saale, Saxony-Anhalt, Germany
- Height: 1.95 m (6 ft 5 in)
- Weight: 105 kg (231 lb)

Sport
- Country: East Germany
- Sport: Men's athletics
- Event: Men's discus
- Club: SC Chemie Halle
- Coached by: Lothar Hinz

Achievements and titles
- Personal best: 64.16 m (1969)
Medal record
Men's athletics
Representing East Germany
Olympic Games
Silver medal – second place	1968 Mexico City	Discus throw
European Championships
Silver medal – second place	1971 Helsinki	Discus throw
Bronze medal – third place	1962 Belgrade	Discus throw
Bronze medal – third place	1966 Budapest	Discus throw
Bronze medal – third place	1969 Athens	Discus throw

Lothar Milde (8 November 1934 – 5 October 2026) was an East German athlete who competed mainly in the discus throw. He was born in Halle an der Saale.

Milde competed at three Olympic Games winning the silver medal at the 1968 Summer Olympics in Mexico City, Mexico. He also finished 12th at the 1960 Games in Rome, Italy and 14th in qualifying, and therefore not making the final, at the 1964 Games in Tokyo, Japan. Milde also won four medals at the European Athletics Championships.

Milde died in Halle an der Saale on 5 October 2026, at the age of 91.
