= Günter Schaumburg =

German discus thrower

Personal information
- Nationality: German
- Born: 1 January 1943 (age 83)

Sport
- Sport: Athletics
- Event: Discus throw

Günter Schaumburg (born 1 January 1943) is a German athlete. He competed in the men's discus throw at the 1968 Summer Olympics.
