= Tim Vollmer =

American discus thrower

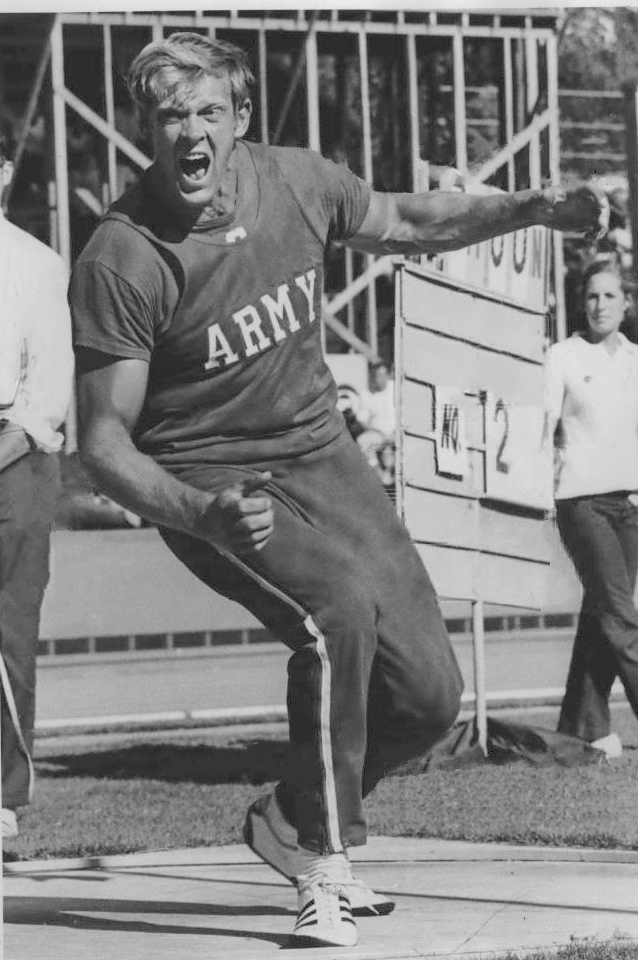
- Vollmer in 1971

Personal information
- Born: September 13, 1946 (age 79) Portland, Oregon, U.S.
- Height: 191 cm (6 ft 3 in)
- Weight: 101 kg (223 lb)

Sport
- Sport: Athletics
- Event(s): Discus throw, shot put
- Club: Oregon State University; New York Athletic Club

Achievements and titles
- Personal best(s): DT – 67.39 m (1971); SP – 17.37 m (1969)
Medal record
Representing the United States
Pan American Games
Silver medal – second place	1971 Cali	Discus throw

Timothy William Vollmer (born September 13, 1946) is a retired American athlete who mainly competed in the discus throw. In 1971 he won the AAU title and a silver medal at the Pan American Games. He placed in the top four at the AAU Championships in 1968–73 and finished eighth at the 1972 Summer Olympics. Vollmer is a member of the Portland Interscholastic League Sports Hall of Fame.
