= Siegfried Pachale =

German former Olympic discus thrower (born 1949)

Personal information
- Nationality: German
- Born: 24 October 1949 (age 76) Elsterwerda, East Germany
- Height: 202 cm (6 ft 8 in)
- Weight: 125 kg (276 lb)

Sport
- Country: East Germany
- Sport: Discus throw

Achievements and titles
- Personal best: 67.54

Siegfried Pachale is a German former Olympic discus thrower. He represented East Germany in the men's discus throw at the 1976 Summer Olympics. His distance was a 60.64 in the qualifiers, and a 64.24 in the finals. He is the father of German volleyball player Hanka Pachale.
