= Josef Šilhavý =

Czech discus thrower

Personal information
- Nationality: Czech
- Born: 17 December 1946 (age 79)

Sport
- Sport: Athletics
- Event: Discus throw

Josef Šilhavý (born 17 December 1946) is a Czech athlete. He competed in the men's discus throw at the 1976 Summer Olympics. His wife, Zdeňka Šilhavá, was also a discus thrower for Czechoslovakia.
