= Kaj Andersen =

Danish discus thrower

Personal information
- Nationality: Danish
- Born: 4 November 1943 Viborg, Denmark
- Died: 15 September 1973 (aged 29) Viborg, Denmark

Sport
- Sport: Athletics
- Event: Discus throw

Kaj Andersen (4 November 1943, Viborg – 15 September 1973, Viborg) was a Danish athlete who competed internationally in athletics. His last result is the 13th place in the men's discus throw at the 1972 Olympics.
