= Jorma Rinne =

Finnish discus thrower

Jorma Rinne (20 April 1936 – 25 May 2003) was a Finnish discus thrower who competed in the 1972 Summer Olympics.
