= Rink Babka =

American discus thrower (1936–2022)

Personal information
- Nickname: Rink
- Nationality: American
- Born: Richard Aldrich Babka; September 23, 1936 Cheyenne, Wyoming
- Died: January 15, 2022 (aged 85)
- Height: 6 ft 5 in (1.96 m)
- Weight: 267 lb (121 kg)
- Website: www.rinkbabka.com

Sport
- Country: United States
- Sport: Track and field
- Event: Discus throw
- College team: Menlo College; USC
- Retired: 1969

Achievements and titles
- Personal best: 63.93 metres (209 ft 9 in)
Medal record
Representing United States
Men's athletics
Olympic Games
Silver medal – second place	1960 Rome	Discus throw
Pan American Games
Silver medal – second place	1967 Winnipeg	Discus throw

Richard Aldrich Babka (September 23, 1936 – January 15, 2022) was an American discus thrower. A former world record holder, Babka also won a silver medal in the discus event at the 1960 Summer Olympics in Rome.

He starred in football, basketball, and baseball in addition to track and field at Palo Alto High School before graduating in 1954. He subsequently attended nearby Menlo College and the University of Southern California (USC). Knee injuries eventually obliged him to withdraw from USC's football and basketball teams, but as a discus thrower he continued to climb toward the top of the world rankings.

Babka continued to compete as a discus thrower until 1969, when he retired to devote himself to various business pursuits.

He later resided in California. Babka was also an artist with works on display with the Art of the Olympians, which was founded by fellow Olympic discus thrower and American Olympics teammate Al Oerter. He died on January 15, 2022, at the age of 85.

Records
Preceded by (Poland) Edmund Piątkowski	Men's Discus World Record Holder; August 12, 1960 – August 11, 1961	Succeeded by (United States) Jay Silvester
