= Erlendur Valdimarsson =

Icelandic discus thrower

Personal information
- Nationality: Icelandic
- Born: 5 November 1947 (age 79)

Sport
- Sport: Athletics
- Event: Discus throw

Erlendur Valdimarsson (born 5 November 1947) is an Icelandic athlete. He competed in the men's discus throw at the 1972 Summer Olympics.
