= János Murányi =

Hungarian discus thrower

Personal information
- Born: 13 January 1944 (age 82) Mezőkövesd, Hungary
- Height: 188 cm (6 ft 2 in)
- Weight: 107 kg (236 lb)

Sport
- Sport: Track and field
- Club: Budapesti Spartacus SC, Budapest

Achievements and titles
- Personal best: 66.38m (1971)
Medal record
Representing Hungary
Summer Universiade
Gold medal – first place	1970 Turin	Discus throw

János Murányi (born 13 January 1944) is a Hungarian retired discus thrower. He represented his native country at the 1972 Summer Olympics in Munich, where he ended up in 12th place in the overall-rankings. Murányi is best known for winning the gold medal in the men's discus event at the 1970 Summer Universiade in Turin, Italy.
