= Géza Fejér =

Hungarian discus thrower (1945–2025)

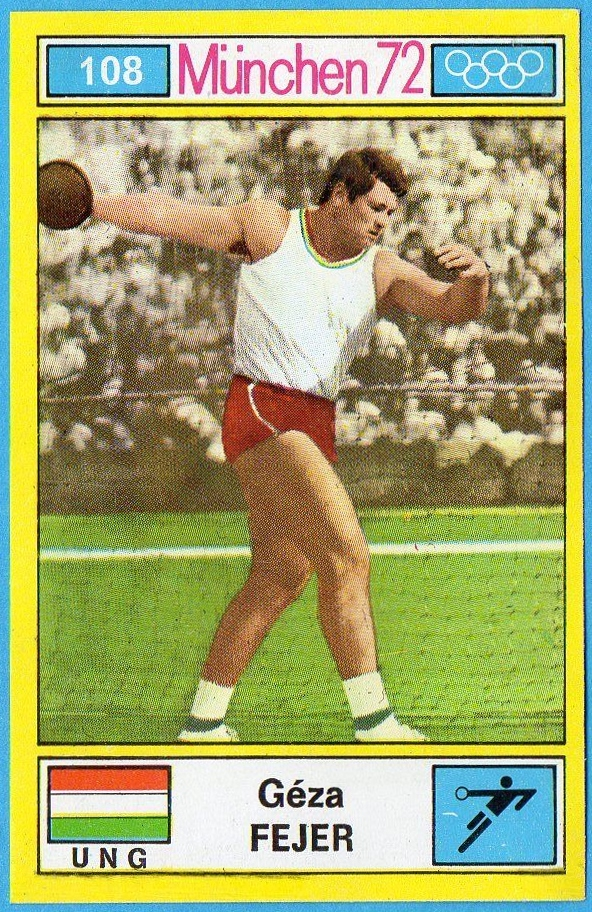

Personal information
- Born: 20 April 1945 Budapest, Hungary
- Died: 13 November 2025 (aged 80) Budapest
- Height: 1.92 m (6 ft 4 in)
- Weight: 120 kg (265 lb)

Sport
- Sport: Athletics
- Event: Discus throw
- Club: Budapest Honvéd

Achievements and titles
- Personal best: 66.92 m (1971)
Medal record
Men's athletics
Representing Hungary
European Championships
Bronze medal – third place	1971 Helsinki	Discus throw
European Junior Championships
Gold medal – first place	1964 Warsaw	Shot put
Gold medal – first place	1964 Warsaw	Discus throw

Géza Fejér (20 April 1945 – 13 November 2025) was a Hungarian discus thrower. He won a bronze medal at the 1971 European Championships and finished fifth in the 1972 Summer Olympics. Fejér died on 13 November 2025, at the age of 80.
