= John Powell (discus thrower) =

American athlete (1947–2022)

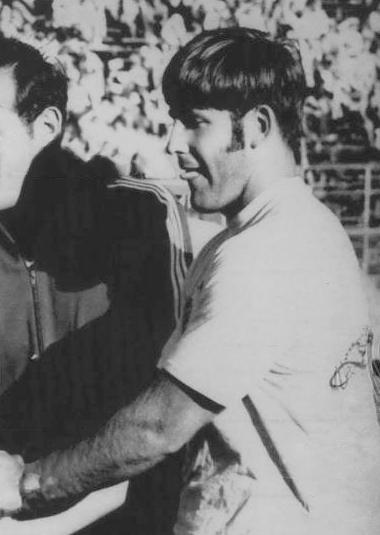
- Powell in 1972

Personal information
- Born: June 25, 1947 San Francisco, California, U.S.
- Died: August 19, 2022 (aged 75) Las Vegas, Nevada, U.S.
- Height: 188 cm (6 ft 2 in)
- Weight: 110 kg (243 lb)

Sport
- Sport: Athletics
- Events: Discus throw, shot put, hammer throw
- University team: San Jose State
- Club: Bud Light Track America

Achievements and titles
- Personal bests: DT – 71.26 m (1984); SP – 17.09 m (1976); HT – 58.49 m (1984)
Medal record
Representing the United States
Olympic Games
Bronze medal – third place	1976 Montreal	Discus
Bronze medal – third place	1984 Los Angeles	Discus
World Championships
Silver medal – second place	1987 Rome	Discus
Pan American Games
Gold medal – first place	1975 Mexico City	Discus

John Gates Powell (June 25, 1947 – August 19, 2022) was an American track and field athlete who specialized in the discus throw. He set a world record at 69.08 meters in 1975, and his personal best of 71.26 meters ties him for ninth place in the all-time performers list.

== Life and career ==
Powell was born in San Francisco, California, on June 25, 1947. He later moved to Sacramento, where he graduated from Mira Loma High School in 1965.

Powell graduated from San Jose State University and served with the San Jose Police Department for seven years. He left the police department to focus on his throwing career.

Powell was a four-time member of the American Olympic Team. Powell finished fourth at the 1972 Summer Olympics in Munich, won a bronze medal at the 1976 Summer Olympics in Montreal, and was a member of the 1980 U.S. Olympic team which did not compete in the USSR due to the 1980 Summer Olympics boycott. He did however receive one of 461 Congressional Gold Medals created especially for the athletes. He won the bronze medal at the 1984 Summer Olympics in Los Angeles.

Additionally, Powell won the British AAA Championships title three times in the discus throw event at the 1974 AAA Championships, 1976 AAA Championships, 1979 AAA Championships and the 1981 AAA Championships.

Some track and field competitions in 1987 appear to have been Powell's last ones on the international level. Powell ran several annual weight-throwing camps with his fellow Olympian weight throwers. Powell also coached a few of his young champion-level throwers at the University of Nevada, Las Vegas, nearly every week. Powell also coached the throwers at Stanford University from 1981 to 1990.

In 2019, he was inducted into the National Track and Field Hall of Fame.

Powell died on August 19, 2022, at the age of 75.

== Achievements ==
- Fourth with 62.82 in the 1972 Summer Olympics in Munich
- First with 62.37 in the 1975 Pan American Games
- Third with 65.70 in the 1976 Summer Olympics in Montreal
- Third with 65.46 in the 1984 Summer Olympics in Los Angeles
- Second with 66.22 in the 1987 World Championships in Athletics in Rome

Powell is a seven time US-champion in Discus throw in 1974, 1975, 1983, 1984, 1985, 1986, 1987

Records
Preceded by (South Africa) John van Reenen	Men's Discus World Record Holder; May 3, 1975 – April 24, 1976	Succeeded by (United States) Mac Wilkins
