= Klaus-Peter Hennig =

German discus thrower (born 1947)

Klaus-Peter Hennig (born 2 May 1947 in Bremen) is a German former discus thrower who competed in the 1968 Summer Olympics and in the 1972 Summer Olympics.
