= Armando De Vincentiis =

Italian discus thrower

Personal information
- Nationality: Italian
- Born: 11 October 1943 (age 82) Ascoli Piceno, Italy
- Height: 1.85 m (6 ft 1 in)
- Weight: 104 kg (229 lb)

Sport
- Country: Italy
- Sport: Athletics
- Event: Discus throw
- Club: ALCO Atalanta Rieti
- Retired: 1983

Achievements and titles
- Personal best: Discus throw: 64,48 m (1976)
Medal record
Men's athletics
Representing Italy
Mediterranean Games
Gold medal – first place	1975 Algiers	Discus throw
Gold medal – first place	1979 Split	Discus throw

Armando De Vincentiis (born 11 October 1943) is an Italian former discus thrower.

== Biography ==
De Vincentiis was born in Ascoli Piceno. He has 48 caps in Italy national athletics team. In his career he participated in two editions of the Olympic Games. In Rome.

== Personal best ==
- Discus throw: 64,48 - (Italy) Rome, 27 May 1976

== National titles ==
- 5 wins in discus throw at the Italian Athletics Championships (1975, 1976, 1978, 1980, 1981)

== See also ==
- Italy national athletics team - More caps
