= Zdravko Pečar =

Slovene discus thrower (1950–2025)

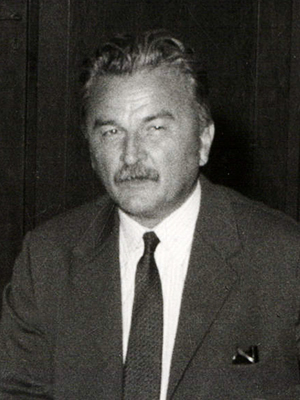
- Pečar

Personal information
- Born: 12 January 1950 Maribor, PR Slovenia, FPR Yugoslavia
- Died: 2 April 2025 (aged 75)

Zdravko Pečar (12 January 1950 – 2 April 2025) was a Slovene discus thrower. He competed for Yugoslavia in the 1972 Summer Olympics. While competing for Brigham Young University he won the 1974 NCAA Championships.

Following his throwing career he also wrote a doctoral dissertation on artificial intelligence at the University of Maribor.

Pečar died following a long illness on 2 April 2025, at the age of 75.
