= Ain Roost =

Canadian discus thrower

Personal information
- Born: May 12, 1946 (age 80) Uppsala, Sweden
Medal record
Men's athletics
Representing Canada
Pan American Games
Bronze medal – third place	1971 Cali	Discus Throw

Ain Roost (born May 12, 1946) is a retired male discus thrower, who represented Canada twice (1972 and 1976) at the Summer Olympics. A resident of San Diego, California, he claimed the bronze medal in the men's discus throw event at the 1971 Pan American Games in Cali, Colombia and finished fifth at the 1975 Pan American Games.

Ain Roost was born in Sweden to parents who left Estonia to escape the Soviet occupation. When he was five years old, the family moved to Canada.

Roost was an All-American thrower for the Utah State Aggies track and field team, finishing 4th in the discus at the 1968 NCAA University Division outdoor track and field championships. He was also a national-level pool player.
