= Lech Gajdziński =

Polish discus thrower (born 1946)

Personal information
- Nationality: Polish
- Born: 25 September 1946 (age 80) Dąbrowa Górnicza, Poland

Sport
- Sport: Athletics
- Event: Discus throw
Medal record
Representing Poland
Summer Universiade
Silver medal – second place	1973 Moscow	Shot put

Lech Gajdziński (born 25 September 1946) is a Polish athlete. He competed in the men's discus throw at the 1968 Summer Olympics.
