= Viktor Zhurba =

Soviet discus thrower

Personal information
- Born: 6 August 1950 (age 75)

Sport
- Sport: Track and field
Medal record
Representing Soviet Union
Summer Universiade
Gold medal – first place	1973 Moscow	Discus throw

Viktor Zhurba (Russian: Виктор Журба; born 6 August 1950) is a retired male discus thrower. He represented the Soviet Union during his career in the late 1960s and early 1970s. Zhurba is best known for winning the gold medal in the men's discus event at the 1973 Summer Universiade in Moscow.
