= Ricky Bruch =

Swedish discus thrower and actor

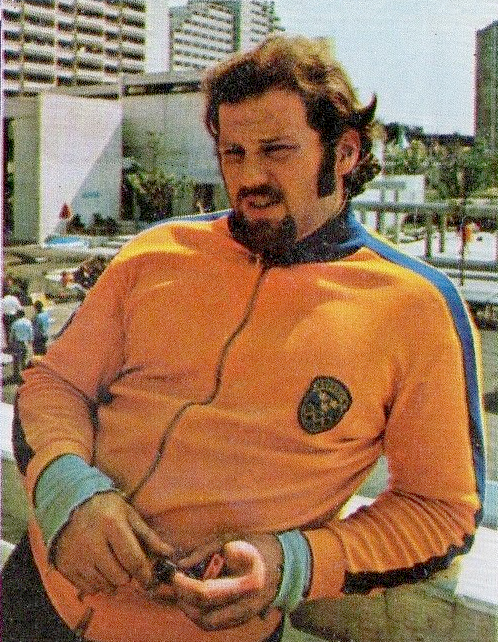
- Ricky Bruch c. 1972

Personal information
- Born: 2 July 1946 Gothenburg, Sweden
- Died: 30 May 2011 (aged 64) Ystad, Sweden
- Height: 1.98 m (6 ft 6 in)
- Weight: 140 kg (309 lb)

Sport
- Sport: Athletics
- Events: Discus throw, shot put
- Club: Malmö AI; IFK Helsingborg; Österhaninge; KA 2
- Coached by: Kurt Alexandersson

Achievements and titles
- Personal bests: DT – 71.26 m (1984); SP – 20.28 m (1973)
Medal record
Men's athletics
Representing Sweden
Olympic Games
Bronze medal – third place	1972 Munich	Discus throw
European Championships
Silver medal – second place	1969 Athens	Discus throw
Bronze medal – third place	1974 Rome	Discus throw
European Athletics Indoor Championships
Bronze medal – third place	1971 Sofia	Shot put
European Cup
Gold medal – first place	1970 Stockholm	Discus throw

Björn Rickard "Ricky" Bruch (Swedish pronunciation: [ˈbrʊɧː]; 2 July 1946 – 30 May 2011) was a Swedish discus thrower, poet and actor.

== Career ==
Bruch was born in Örgryte, Gothenburg, grew up in Skåne, and was later a long-time resident of Malmö. His main discipline was the shot put, and later the discus, as he joined the ranks of the world's greatest in the early 1970s. The highlight of his career came in 1972, when he equalled the world record of 68.40 metres at the Dagens Nyheter games in Stockholm and, later that season, won a bronze medal at the 1972 Summer Olympics in Munich.

Throughout his career, Bruch was known as being both outspoken and controversial. He readily changed his opinions on various matters, and represented around a dozen athletics teams, including his own IK Diskus. Bruch was a solid athlete, but failed to achieve the greatest success possible in major international events. Arguably, Bruch's greatest successes were Olympic bronze in 1972 along with silver and bronze at the European Championships in Athletics. Bruch equaled the world record in 1972 with a throw of 68.40 metres. His personal best (71.26 metres in November 1984) puts him ninth in the all-time performers list. As well as achieving his sporting career and his turbulent personal life, Bruch also acted in light-entertainment films, debuting in the Italian action comedy film Anche gli angeli tirano di destro and appearing in a minor role in the film version of Ronia the Robber's Daughter. After Bruch retired, he admitted to having used doping throughout his career. Despite this, he never tested positive during his career.

His autobiography Gladiatorns kamp (The Gladiator's Battle) was printed in 1990, and an anthology of his poetry, Själ och kropp: Dikter (Body and Soul: Poems), has also been published.

After a few years away from the glare of publicity in the early 1980s, he returned to the spotlight at the age of 38 in the autumn of 1984 – returning to form, he managed a number of throws over the 70 metre mark. He achieved his personal record of 71.26 metres in November 1984 at a competition in Malmö. This mark stood as the Swedish record for 35 years until Daniel Ståhl surpassed it in 2019. At the Swedish Championships in Västerås in 1985, Bruch was involved in a dispute with Anders Borgström, the team captain at the time. Bruch's willingness to speak his mind resulted, effectively, in his disqualification. However, he continued to appear in the media from time to time, most recently in a TV4 documentary from July 2005.

Bruch died on 30 May 2011 from pancreatic cancer.

== Bibliography ==
- Bruch, Ricky (1990). Gladiatorns kamp: dramat om sanningen bakom rubrikerna om en ännu levande legend- : en självbiografi (in Swedish). [Löddeköpinge]: [RB promotion]. SELIBR 1173045.
- Bruch, Ricky (1979). System 2000 och 2001: från nybörjare till elitidrottsman : allt om kost och träning (in Swedish). Rickysport. SELIBR 17775080.
- Bruch, Ricky; Johansson, Mona (1980). Kvinnlig figurträning: [bodyshaping och bodybuilding] (in Swedish). Sösdala: Musclecenter. SELIBR 8206802.
- Bruch, Ricky (1975). Själ och kropp: dikter (in Swedish). Malmö: Kristallförl. SELIBR 1771317.

== Filmography ==
- 1974 – Charleston
- 1974 – Även änglar kan slå en rak höger
- 1978 – Dante – akta're för Hajen!
- 1978 – I Skyttens tegn
- 1984 – Ronia, the Robber's Daughter
- 1985 – Själen är större än världen
- 1993 – Drömkåken

Records
Preceded by (United States) Jay Silvester	Men's Discus World Record Holder equalled the 68.40 m mark from Jay Silvester; 5 July 1972 – 14 March 1975	Succeeded by (South Africa) John van Reenen
Preceded by (Czechoslovakia) Ludvík Daněk	Men's Discus European Record Holder; 21 September 1969 – 21 May 1976	Succeeded by (East Germany) Wolfgang Schmidt
