= Wolfgang Schmidt (athlete) =

East German discus thrower (born 1954)

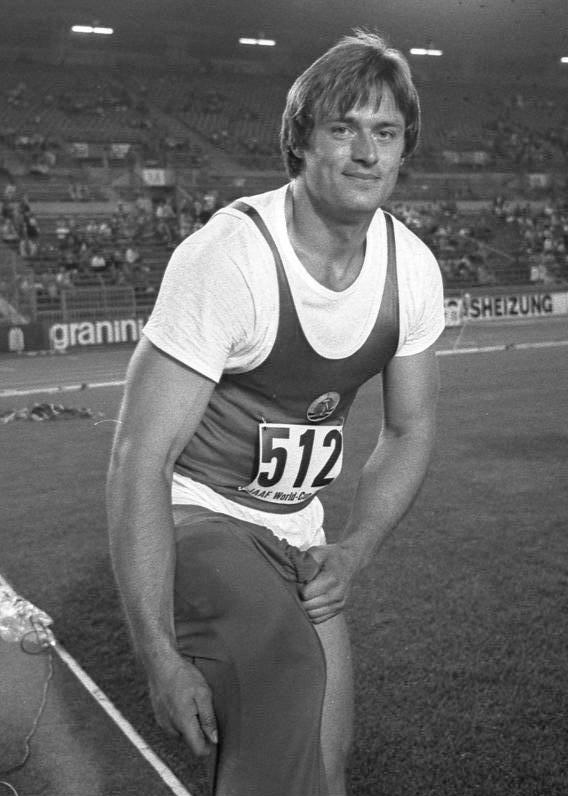
- Schmidt at the 1977 IAAF World Cup Final in Düsseldorf

Personal information
- Born: Wolfgang Schmidt; 16 January 1954 (age 72) East Berlin, East Germany
- Height: 1.99 m (6 ft 6 in)
- Weight: 115 kg (254 lb)

Sport
- Country: East Germany (1974–1987); West Germany (1988–1990); Germany (1991–1992)
- Sport: Men's athletics
- Event: Men's Discus
- Club: SC Dynamo Berlin; Stuttgarter Kickers

Achievements and titles
- Personal best: 71.16 m (1978)
Medal record
Men's athletics
Representing East Germany
Olympic Games
Silver medal – second place	1976 Montreal	Discus
European Championships
Gold medal – first place	1978 Prague	Discus
Bronze medal – third place	1978 Prague	Shot put
Universiade
Gold medal – first place	1979 Mexico City	Discus
Representing West Germany
European Championships
Bronze medal – third place	1990 Split	Discus

Wolfgang Schmidt (born 16 January 1954) is a German former track and field athlete who competed for East Germany at the 1976 Summer Olympics and won the silver medal in the discus throw. A former world record holder, he also won several medals at the European Athletics Championships. Schmidt made headlines in 1982 due to his failed attempt to escape from East Germany. He later competed for the Federal Republic of Germany and won third place in the 1990 European Athletics Championships. Born in Berlin, he competed for the SC Dynamo Berlin / Sportvereinigung (SV) Dynamo.

== Athletic achievements ==
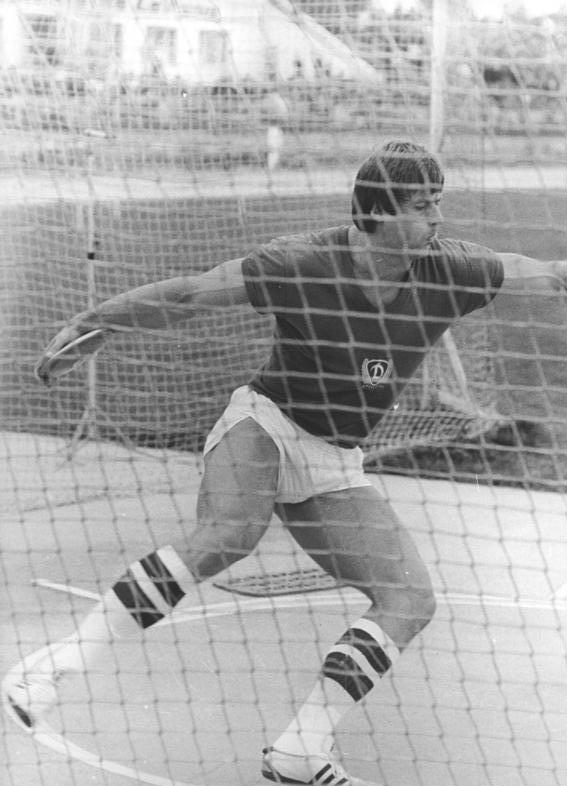
Schmidt at a 1978 competition

- 1973: European Junior Championships: first place in discus (61.30)
- 1974: European Championships: eighth place in discus (59.56)
- 1976: Olympic Games: second place in discus (63.68 – foul – 65.16 – foul – 63.96 – 66.22)
- 1978: European Championships: first place in discus (64.04 – 61.68 – 64.52 – 62.08 – 65.94 – 66.82); third place in shot put (19.86 – 19.63 – 19.92 – 19.62 – 20.30 – 19.49)
- 1980: Olympic Games: fourth place in discus (65.64)
- 1990: European Championships: third place in discus (61.28 – 60.84 – foul – 64.08 – 64.10 – foul), competing for West Germany.
- 1991: World Championships: fourth place in discus (64.76)

His personal best throw was 71.16 metres, achieved in August 1978 in Berlin. This ranks him third among German discus throwers, only behind Jürgen Schult and Lars Riedel.

== Flight from East Germany ==
After a disappointing fourth-place finish at the 1980 Olympics and missing the 1981 World Cup in Rome due to a second-place finish in the East German Championships, Schmidt decided to pursue athletic success in the West.

He was constantly under surveillance by the Volkspolizei and they uncovered a plan for his escape (aided by discus colleagues Ricky Bruch and Alwin Wagner); in the autumn of 1982, Schmidt was sentenced to one and a half years in prison. However, one year later he was paroled, on the condition he become a coach with SC Dynamo Adlershof, a sports team of the Felix Dzerzhinsky Watch Regiment.

Schmidt filed a departure request so that he could continue his athletic career in the West. At the end of 1987, he was allowed to move to West Germany, though it was already too late to be considered for the 1988 Olympic Games in Seoul. After the first track competition between East and West Germany, Jürgen Schult, having won the discus throw, refused to shake hands with Schmidt.

== Life after political turmoil ==
In 1992 Schmidt unseated Jürgen Schult as the German champion in the discus throw. He competed in the qualification meets for the 1992 Olympic Games in Barcelona, but was not considered for the German Olympic team (rival Jürgen Schult was chosen and went on to win the silver medal). Schmidt later moved to San Francisco and became a stockbroker and management consultant.

In East Germany, Schmidt competed for SV Dynamo and trained with Joachim Spenke. He later competed for LG VfB Stuttgart and Stuttgarter Kickers. While competing, he was 1.99 meters tall and weighed 115 kg.

Records
Preceded by (United States) Mac Wilkins	Men's Discus World Record Holder; 9 August 1978 – 29 May 1983	Succeeded by (Soviet Union) Yuriy Dumchev
Preceded by (Sweden) Ricky Bruch	Men's Discus European Record Holder; 21 May 1976 – 29 May 1983	Succeeded by (Soviet Union) Yuriy Dumchev
