= Pentti Kahma =

Finnish discus thrower (born 1943)

Medal record

Men's athletics

Representing Finland

European Championships
| Gold medal – first place | 1974 Rome | Discus throw |

Pentti Aatos Kahma (December 3, 1943 Alavieska) is a retired discus thrower from Finland, who is best known for winning the title at the 1974 European Championships in Rome, Italy. He represented his native country at the 1976 Summer Olympics in Montreal, Quebec, Canada.
