= Ludvík Daněk =

Czechoslovak discus thrower

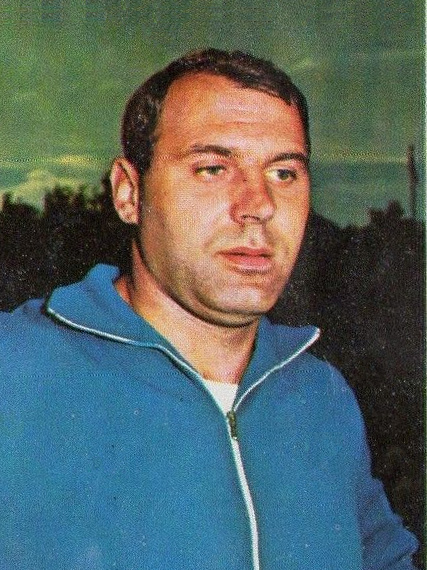

Personal information
- Nationality: Czech
- Born: January 6, 1937 Blansko, Czechoslovakia
- Died: November 16, 1998 (aged 61) Hutisko-Solanec, Czech Republic
- Height: 1.93 m (6 ft 4 in)
- Weight: 123 kg (271 lb)

Sport
- Country: Czechoslovakia
- Sport: Athletics
- Event: Discus throw
- Club: Spartak Brno, Sparta Praha

Achievements and titles
- Personal best: 67.18 m (1974)
Medal record
Men's athletics
Representing Czechoslovakia
Olympic Games
Gold medal – first place	1972 Munich	Discus throw
Silver medal – second place	1964 Tokyo	Discus throw
Bronze medal – third place	1968 Mexico City	Discus throw
European Championships
Gold medal – first place	1971 Helsinki	Discus throw
Silver medal – second place	1974 Rome	Discus throw

Ludvík Daněk (Czech pronunciation: [ˈludviːk ˈdaɲɛk]; 6 January 1937 – 16 November 1998) was a Czechoslovak discus thrower, who won the gold medal at the 1972 Olympic Games with a throw of 64.40 m (211 ft 3 in).

Daněk was born in Blansko, and competed in four Summer Olympics for Czechoslovakia, winning silver in the 1964 Olympics, bronze in the 1968 Olympics and gold in the 1972 Olympics. He set three world records in discus throw, of 64.55 m in 1964, 65.22 m in 1965 and of 66.07 m in 1966. He also won several medals at the European Athletics Championships. He was the gold medallist at the 1971 European Athletics Championships and was the silver medallist three years later at the 1974 European Athletics Championships.

After retiring from competitions Daněk became a sports administrator, and served as vice-president of the Czech athletics federation. The location where he set his first world record in 1964 is now celebrated with a memorial circle, and the venue in Turnov is now called the Ludvík Daněk Stadium. He died in Hutisko-Solanec near Vsetín, aged 61. Since 1999, the year following his death, the stadium has hosted an annual track and field meeting in his honour – the Ludvík Daněk Memorial.

== Major competitions ==
- 1964: Olympic Games: 2nd place (60.52)
- 1966: European Championships: 5th place (56.24)
- 1968: Olympic Games: 3rd place (62.92)
- 1969: European Championships: 4th place (59.30)
- 1971: European Championships: 1st place (63.90)
- 1972: Olympic Games: 1st place (64.40)
- 1974: European Championships: 2nd place (62.76)
- 1976: Olympic Games: 9th place (61.28)

Records
Preceded by Al Oerter	Men's Discus World Record Holder; 2 August 1964 – 25 May 1968	Succeeded by Jay Silvester
