= Silvano Simeon =

Italian discus thrower

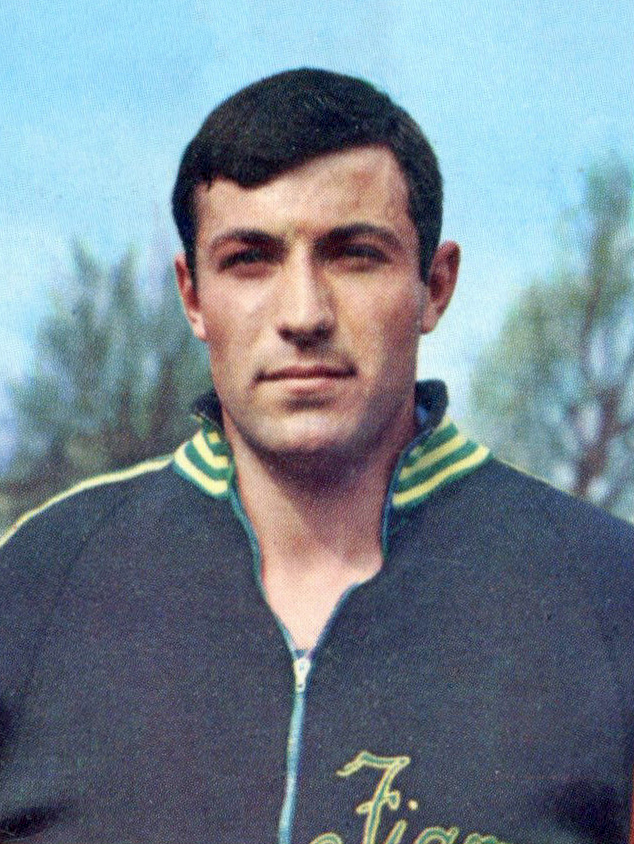
- Simeon in 1968

Personal information
- Nationality: Italian
- Born: 27 October 1945 Visco, Italy
- Died: 12 December 2010 (aged 65) Turin, Italy
- Height: 1.89 m (6 ft 2 1/2 in)
- Weight: 115 kg (254 lb)

Sport
- Sport: Athletics
- Event: Discus throw
- Club: Snia Milan
- Retired: 1982

Achievements and titles
- Personal best: 65.10 m (1976)
Medal record
Representing Italy
Universiade
Bronze medal – third place	1970 Turin	Discus throw
Mediterranean Games
Gold medal – first place	1967 Tunis	Discus throw
Gold medal – first place	1971 Smirne	Discus throw
Silver medal – second place	1975 Algiers	Discus throw
Bronze medal – third place	1979 Split	Discus throw

Silvano Simeon (27 October 1945 – 12 December 2010) was an Italian discus thrower. He competed at the 1972 and 1976 Olympics and finished in 10th and 19th place, respectively.

== Biography ==
During his career Simeon won 10 national titles (1966, 1967, 1969–1974, 1977, 1979), and took part in 52 international competitions. In retirement he worked as athletics coach.

== Achievements ==
Year	Competition	Venue	Position	Performance	Notes
1966	European Championships	(Hungary) Budapest	6th	55.96 m	
1971	European Championships	(Finland) Helsinki	elim. qual.	NM	
1972	Olympic Games	(West Germany) Munich	6th	59.34 m	
1974	European Championships	(Italy) Rome	14th	56.14 m	(Note: Better in qualifying, 58.22 m)
1976	Olympic Games	(Canada) Montreal	19th	59.06 m	
1978	European Championships	(Czechoslovakia) Prague	12th	59.16 m	
