= Ferenc Tégla =

Hungarian discus thrower (born 1947)

Personal information
- Born: 15 July 1947 (age 78) Szegvár, Hungary

Sport
- Sport: Track and field
Medal record
Representing Hungary
Summer Universiade
Silver medal – second place	1975 Rome	Discus throw
Bronze medal – third place	1973 Moscow	Discus throw

Ferenc Tégla (born 15 July 1947) is a Hungarian former discus thrower who competed in the 1968 Summer Olympics, 1972 Summer Olympics, and 1976 Summer Olympics.
