= Al Oerter =

American track & field athlete (1936–2007)

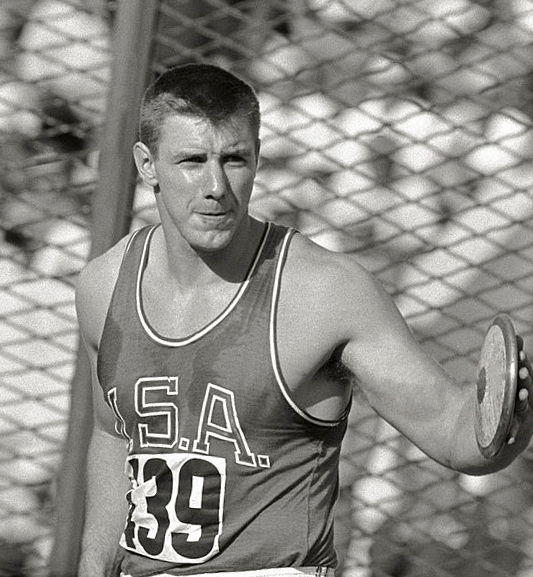
- Oerter at the Rome 1960 Olympics

Personal information
- Full name: Alfred Adolph Oerter Jr.
- Born: September 19, 1936 Astoria, New York, U.S.
- Died: October 1, 2007 (aged 71) Fort Myers, Florida, U.S.
- Height: 6 ft 3 1/2 in (192 cm)
- Weight: 276 lb (125 kg)

Sport
- Country: United States
- Sport: Athletics
- Events: Discus throw, shot put
- Club: New York Athletic Club

Achievements and titles
- Personal bests: DT – 69.47 m (1980); SP – 17.37 m (1958)
Medal record
Representing the United States
Olympic Games
Gold medal – first place	1956 Melbourne	Discus throw
Gold medal – first place	1960 Rome	Discus throw
Gold medal – first place	1964 Tokyo	Discus throw
Gold medal – first place	1968 Mexico City	Discus throw
Pan American Games
Gold medal – first place	1959 Chicago	Discus throw
Olympic Boycott Games
Silver medal – second place	1980 Philadelphia	Discus throw
- Updated on June 12, 2015

Alfred Adolph Oerter Jr. (/ˈɔːrtər/; September 19, 1936 – October 1, 2007) was an American athlete and a four-time Olympic champion in the discus throw. He was the first athlete to win a gold medal in the same individual event in four consecutive Olympic Games. Oerter is an inductee of the IAAF Hall of Fame.

== Olympic athlete ==
Oerter was born in 1936 in Astoria, Queens, New York City and grew up in New Hyde Park; he attended Sewanhaka High School in Floral Park. He began his track and field career at the age of 15 when a discus landed at his feet and he threw it back past the crowd of throwers. Oerter continued throwing and eventually earned a scholarship to the University of Kansas in 1954 where he became a member of Delta Tau Delta fraternity. A large man of almost 6 ft 4 in (193 cm) and 280 pounds (130 kg), Oerter was a natural thrower. Competing for Kansas, he became the NCAA discus champion in 1957; he successfully defended his title the following year.

Oerter began his Olympic career at the 1956 Summer Olympics in Melbourne. He was not considered the favorite but he felt a rush during the competition and he unleashed a throw of 184 feet 10 inches (56.34 m)—which, at the time, was a career best. The throw was good enough to win the competition by more than 5 inches (130 mm).Oerter began his Olympic career at the 1956 Summer Olympics in Melbourne. He was not considered one of the favorites, but in the final he produced a lifetime-best throw of 56.36 m (184 ft 11 in), which set a new Olympic record and won him the gold medal.

In 1957, it seemed that Oerter's career would be over at the age of 20 when he was nearly killed in an automobile accident. He recovered in time to compete at the 1960 Summer Olympics at Rome, where he was the slight favorite over teammate Rink Babka, who was the world record holder.

Babka was in the lead for the first four of the six rounds. He gave Oerter advice before his fifth throw; Oerter threw his discus 194 feet 2 inches (59.18 m), setting an Olympic record. Babka settled for the silver medal when he was not able to beat Oerter's throw.

During the early 1960s, Oerter continued to have success and set his first world record in 1962. In the process, he was the first to break 200 feet in the discus. He was considered a heavy favorite to win a third gold medal at Tokyo in 1964.

Oerter was hampered by injuries before the Games began. He was bothered by a neck injury that required him to wear a neck brace, and a week before the start of the competition he tore cartilage in his ribs. Oerter was competing in great pain, but he set a new Olympic standard and won a third Olympic gold medal despite not being able to take his last throw due to the pain from his ribs. He had told the doctors, "These are the Olympics. You die for them."

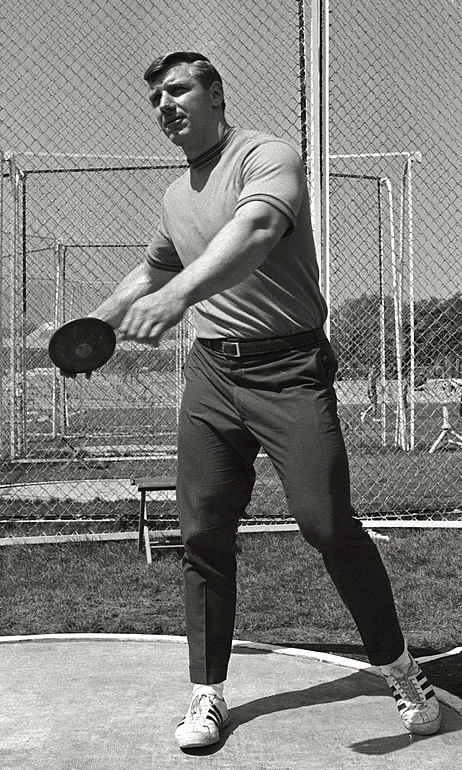
Oerter in 1968

Oerter returned to the Olympics in 1968 at Mexico City; however, teammate Jay Silvester was cast as the favorite. Many felt Oerter, who was then 32, could not win the event because he had never thrown as far as Silvester did on his average throws. At the Olympics, however, Oerter hurled another Olympic record throw of 64.78 metres (212.5 ft) on his third throw. His record held and he became the first track and field athlete to win gold medals in four consecutive Olympic Games. This accomplishment would be equaled many years later by fellow Americans Carl Lewis in 1996, swimmer Michael Phelps in 2016, and swimmer Katie Ledecky in 2024.

Oerter retired from athletics after the 1968 Olympics. He later eyed a comeback and took anabolic steroids in 1976 under medical supervision in order to put on muscle mass. However, he stopped the course as this affected his blood pressure and failed to give much improvement on the field. After this he advised athletes to avoid such drugs and focus on training and technique instead. He was critical of the increase of drug use and the subsequent testing in track and field, stating that it had destroyed the culture of athlete camaraderie and that the banning of athletes such as Ben Plucknett was merely scapegoating by international officials.

Oerter did make an attempt to qualify for the American team in 1980 but finished fourth. He nonetheless set his overall personal record of 69.46 metres (227.9 ft) that year at the age of 43. Dr. Gideon Ariel, a former Olympic shot putter himself for Israel, had developed a business of biomechanical services, and Oerter after working with Ariel—at age 43—threw a discus 27 feet farther than his best gold medal performance.

When filming for a TV segment, he unofficially threw about 245 feet (75 m), which would have set a world record only surpassed in 2025. In later years, Oerter carried the Olympic flag for the 1984 Summer Olympics, then carried Olympic flame into the stadium for the 1996 Olympic Games.

== Later life, death and Art of the Olympians ==
Oerter had struggled with high blood pressure his entire life, and in the 2000s, he became terminally ill with cardiovascular disease. On March 13, 2003, Oerter experienced a period of being clinically dead; a change of blood pressure medications caused pericardial effusion, a fluid build-up, around his heart.

Oerter was inducted into the Suffolk Sports Hall of Fame on Long Island in the Track & Field Category with the Class of 1990. In 2005, Oerter was inducted into the Nassau County Sports Hall of Fame.

As a child, Oerter had frequently traveled to his grandparents' home in Manhattan and admired their art collection. As a retired athlete, Oerter became an abstract painter. Oerter enjoyed the freedom of abstract art, and thus decided against formal schooling for his art, as he thought it might stifle his creativity. Part of Oerter's work was his "Impact" series of paintings. For these works, Oerter would lay a puddle of a paint on a tarp, and fling a discus into it to create splashing lines on a canvas positioned in front of the tarp. If the discus landed painted-face up, Oerter would sign it and give it to whoever purchased the painting.

In 2006 he founded the Art of the Olympians organization and held an Olympian Art exhibition in his home town of Fort Myers. This first show included artworks and sculptures from 14 Olympians, including Florence Griffith Joyner, Roald Bradstock, Shane Gould, Cameron Myler, Rink Babka and Larry Young. Later that year the exhibit traveled to New York City for shows at the United Nations, the New York Athletic Club and then at the National Arts Club. Art of the Olympians also had their work on display on the giant Panasonic Astro-Vision screen in Times Square for the entire month November 2006. Oerter and other Olympian artists were also featured on the CBS Morning Show to discuss their New York Tour.

In mid-2007, Art of the Olympians was given the rights to use the word Olympian by the United States Olympic Committee (USOC)—an act protected by Congress. On August 1, 2007, Art of the Olympians was awarded a 501(c)(3) status.

As Oerter's heart condition progressed, he was advised by cardiologists that he would require a heart transplant. Oerter dismissed the suggestion. "I've had an interesting life," he said, "and I'm going out with what I have." Oerter died on October 1, 2007, of heart failure in Fort Myers, Florida at the age of 71. He was survived by his wife and two daughters.

Upon learning of Oerter's death, track and field historian and blogger Mike Young wrote that Oerter was arguably the greatest Olympian of all time.

On March 7, 2009, the Al Oerter Recreation Center, operated by New York City Department of Parks and Recreation, opened in Flushing Meadows–Corona Park in Flushing, Queens.

In 2025, a collection consisting of a signed photograph, a personal practice disc, and his four gold medals was featured on Antiques Roadshow, appraised at $400,000.

== See also ==
- List of multiple Olympic gold medalists in one event
- List of multiple Summer Olympic medalists

Records
Preceded by Jay Silvester; Vladimir Trusenyev	Men's Discus World Record Holder; May 18 – June 4, 1962; July 1 – August 2, 1964	Succeeded by Vladimir Trusenyev; Ludvík Daněk
