= 1962 European Athletics Championships – Men's discus throw =

Men's discus throw at the European Athletics Championships

The men's discus throw at the 1962 European Athletics Championships was held in Belgrade, then Yugoslavia, at JNA Stadium on 12 and 13 September 1962.

== Medalists ==
Gold	Vladimir Trusenyev; Soviet Union
Silver	Cees Koch; Netherlands
Bronze	Lothar Milde; East Germany

== Results ==
=== Final ===
13 September

Rank	Name	Nationality	Result	Notes
1st place, gold medalist(s)	Vladimir Trusenyev	Soviet Union	57.11	CR
2nd place, silver medalist(s)	Cees Koch	Netherlands	55.96	
3rd place, bronze medalist(s)	Lothar Milde	East Germany	55.47	
4	Edmund Piątkowski	Poland	55.13	
5	Viktor Kompaniyets	Soviet Union	54.74	
6	József Szécsényi	Hungary	54.66	
7	Fritz Kühl	East Germany	53.86	
8	Carmelo Rado	Italy	52.82	
9	Ludvík Daněk	Czechoslovakia	52.12	
10	Todor Artarski	Bulgaria	51.01	
11	Lars Haglund	Sweden	50.48	
12	Đorđe Rakić	Yugoslavia	49.80	

=== Qualification ===
12 September

Rank	Name	Nationality	Result	Notes
1	Edmund Piątkowski	Poland	55.79	CR Q
2	Cees Koch	Netherlands	54.72	Q
3	Viktor Kompaniyets	Soviet Union	53.96	Q
4	Vladimir Trusenyev	Soviet Union	53.88	Q
5	József Szécsényi	Hungary	53.38	Q
6	Lars Haglund	Sweden	53.28	Q
7	Đorđe Rakić	Yugoslavia	53.19	Q
8	Todor Artarski	Bulgaria	53.16	Q
9	Lothar Milde	East Germany	53.11	Q
10	Ludvík Daněk	Czechoslovakia	53.00	Q
11	Fritz Kühl	East Germany	52.86	Q
12	Carmelo Rado	Italy	52.77	Q
13	Dako Radošević	Yugoslavia	52.56	
14	Stein Haugen	Norway	52.52	
15	Zenon Begier	Poland	52.39	
16	Carol Lindroos	Finland	51.96	
17	Pentti Repo	Finland	51.83	
18	Josef Klik	West Germany	50.95	
19	Gaetano dalla Pria	Italy	50.71	
20	Ladislav Petrovic	Czechoslovakia	50.28	
21	Pierre Alard	France	49.96	
22	Ferenc Klics	Hungary	49.49	
23	Georgios Tsakanikas	Greece	48.96	
24	Mathias Mehr	Switzerland	47.82	
25	Eric Cleaver	Great Britain	47.08	
	Antonios Kounadis	Greece	NM	
	Franco Grossi	Italy	NM	

== Participation ==
According to an unofficial count, 27 athletes from 17 countries participated in the event.

- Bulgaria (1)
- Czechoslovakia (2)
- East Germany (2)
- Finland (2)
- France (1)
- Greece (2)
- Hungary (2)
- Italy (3)
- Netherlands (1)
- Norway (1)
- Poland (2)
- Soviet Union (2)
- Sweden (1)
- Switzerland (1)
- Great Britain (1)
- West Germany (1)
- Yugoslavia (2)
