= Athletics at the 1964 Summer Olympics – Men's discus throw =

Men's discus throw at the Games of the XVIII Olympiad
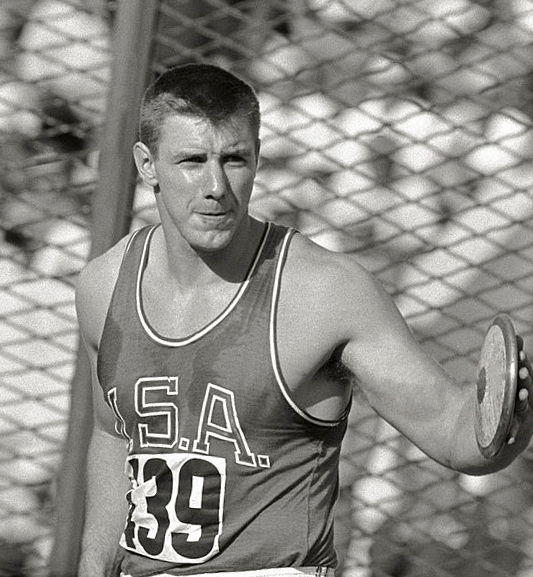
- Al Oerter (1960)
- Venue: Olympic Stadium
- Date: 15 October 1964
- Competitors: 29 from 21 nations
- Winning distance: 61.00 OR

Medalists
1st place, gold medalist(s)		Al Oerter; United States
2nd place, silver medalist(s)		Ludvik Danek; Czechoslovakia
3rd place, bronze medalist(s)		Dave Weill; United States

The men's discus throw was one of four men's throwing events on the Athletics at the 1964 Summer Olympics program in Tokyo. It was held on 15 October 1964. 29 athletes from 21 nations entered, with 1 additional athlete not starting in the qualification round. The maximum number of athletes per nation had been set at 3 since the 1930 Olympic Congress. The event was won by Al Oerter of the United States, the nation's fourth consecutive and 11th overall victory in the men's discus throw. Oerter became the first man to win three medals in the event, all of them gold (through the 2016 Olympics, two other men have won three medals but neither of them won three gold medals). He was only the second person to win three consecutive gold medals in any individual athletics event (after John Flanagan in the hammer from 1904 to 1912). It was the third of his four consecutive wins in the event. Ludvik Danek of Czechoslovakia took silver to break up the Americans' two-Games dominance of the discus podium; no non-American had won a medal since 1952. Dave Weill earned bronze to make this the fourth straight Games that the United States had won at least two medals in the event.

== Background ==
This was the 15th appearance of the event, which is one of 12 athletics events to have been held at every Summer Olympics. Returning finalists from the 1960 Games were two-time gold medalist Al Oerter of the United States, fourth-place finisher József Szécsényi of Hungary, fifth-place finisher Edmund Piątkowski and fourteenth-place finisher Zenon Begier of Poland, sixth-place finisher Viktor Kompaniyets, eighth-place finisher Kim Bukhantsov, and fifteenth-place finisher Vladimir Trusenyov of the Soviet Union, ninth-place finisher Pentti Repo of Finland, twelfth-place finisher Lothar Milde of the United Team of Germany, twenty-first-place finisher Warwick Selvey of Australia, and twenty-second-place finisher Cees Koch of the Netherlands. Bukhantsov had also been a finalist in 1956. Oerter was the first man to break 200 feet, with his first world record in 1962. Ludvik Danek of Czechoslovakia took the world record shortly before the Games, however, breaking 63 and 64 meters (and 210 feet). Oerter lost the U.S. trials to Jay Silvester, and entered the Games hampered by injuries.

Iran, the Ivory Coast, and Puerto Rico each made their debut in the men's discus throw. The United States made its 15th appearance, having competed in every edition of the Olympic men's discus throw to date.

== Competition format ==
The competition used the two-round format introduced in 1936, with the qualifying round completely separate from the divided final. In qualifying, each athlete received three attempts; those recording a mark of at least 55.00 metres advanced to the final. If fewer than 12 athletes achieved that distance, the top 12 would advance. The results of the qualifying round were then ignored. Finalists received three throws each, with the top six competitors receiving an additional three attempts. The best distance among those six throws counted.

== Records ==
Prior to the competition, the existing world and Olympic records were as follows.

World record	Ludvik Danek (TCH)	64.55	Turnov, Czechoslovakia	2 August 1964
Olympic record	Al Oerter (USA)	59.18	Rome, Italy	7 September 1960

Al Oerter led the qualifying round with a new Olympic record of 60.54 metres. Ludvik Danek, throwing later, beat the old record but not Oerter's new record. In the final, Danek (three times), Dave Weill (once), and Jay Silvester (once) all topped the old record but could not beat the new one. Oerter himself managed only one throw past the old record—but it was the best throw of the whole competition, giving Oerter the gold medal and another new Olympic record of 61.00 metres.

== Schedule ==
All times are Japan Standard Time (UTC+9)

Date	Time	Round
Thursday, 15 October 1964	10:00; 14:30	Qualifying; Final

== Results ==
=== Qualifying ===
The qualification standard was 55.00 metres. Each thrower had three attempts to reach that standard. Since only 10 throwers made the mark, the next two furthest also advanced to meet the minimum 12 in the final. The table shows the results of the three qualifying rounds.

Rank	Athlete	Nation	1	2	3	Distance	Notes
1	Al Oerter	United States	60.54	—	—	60.54	Q, OR
2	Ludvik Danek	Czechoslovakia	58.88	—	—	58.88	Q
3	Jay Silvester	United States	X	57.81	—	57.81	Q
4	Viktor Kompaniyets	Soviet Union	57.40	—	—	57.40	Q
5	Dave Weill	United States	56.95	—	—	56.95	Q
6	Hartmut Losch	United Team of Germany	56.46	—	—	56.46	Q
7	Zenon Begier	Poland	56.31	—	—	56.31	Q
8	Roy Hollingsworth	Great Britain	52.60	55.08	55.96	55.96	Q
9	Edmund Piątkowski	Poland	55.22	—	—	55.22	Q
10	József Szécsényi	Hungary	55.04	—	—	55.04	Q
11	Kim Bukhantsev	Soviet Union	54.94	X	X	54.94	q
12	Vladimir Trusenyov	Soviet Union	53.81	51.94	52.25	53.81	q
13	Fritz Kühl	United Team of Germany	53.53	53.04	X	53.53	
14	Lothar Milde	United Team of Germany	53.39	50.83	X	53.39	
15	Pentti Repo	Finland	52.93	X	50.60	52.93	
16	Dako Radošević	Yugoslavia	51.22	52.71	51.37	52.71	
17	Kees Koch	Netherlands	51.20	52.57	51.08	52.57	
18	Jiří Žemba	Czechoslovakia	X	52.13	51.80	52.13	
19	Warwick Selvey	Australia	50.83	X	51.96	51.96	
20	Ernst Soudek	Austria	X	51.78	50.96	51.78	
21	Les Mills	New Zealand	44.18	51.70	51.22	51.70	
22	Georgios Tsakanikas	Greece	50.76	51.03	48.07	51.03	
23	Shohei Kaneko	Japan	44.63	43.31	46.46	46.46	
24	Segui Denis Kragbe	Ivory Coast	44.07	46.43	44.03	46.43	
25	Ignacio Reinosa	Puerto Rico	46.36	45.96	X	46.36	
26	Gideon Ariel	Israel	45.10	44.26	46.12	46.12	
27	Jalal Keshmiri	Iran	X	45.24	44.96	45.24	
28	Kim Byeong-gi	South Korea	42.73	X	X	42.73	
—	Lars Haglund	Sweden	X	X	X	No mark	
—	Valko Kostov	Bulgaria	DNS				

=== Finals ===
The scores from the qualification round were erased and each thrower was given three throws. The six best in those three received another three throws, keeping all six.

Rank	Athlete	Nation	1	2	3	4	5	6	Distance	Notes
1st place, gold medalist(s)	Al Oerter	United States	57.65	58.34	55.11	54.37	61.00 OR	X	61.00	OR
2nd place, silver medalist(s)	Ludvik Danek	Czechoslovakia	59.73	58.83	X	60.52	58.38	57.17	60.52	
3rd place, bronze medalist(s)	Dave Weill	United States	X	59.49	56.15	56.15	55.94	52.45	59.49	
4	Jay Silvester	United States	56.99	X	57.54	57.46	59.09	X	59.09	
5	József Szécsényi	Hungary	54.34	52.14	56.97	57.23	X	54.66	57.23	
6	Zenon Begier	Poland	57.06	52.45	55.83	X	X	56.68	57.06	
7	Edmund Piątkowski	Poland	52.94	55.81	53.87	Did not advance			55.81	
8	Vladimir Trusenev	Soviet Union	53.70	54.78	52.98	Did not advance			54.78	
9	Kim Bukhantsev	Soviet Union	X	50.15	54.38	Did not advance			54.38	
10	Roy Anselm Hollingsworth	Great Britain	53.74	53.87	X	Did not advance			53.87	
11	Hartmut Losch	United Team of Germany	51.44	52.08	X	Did not advance			52.08	
12	Viktor Kompaniyets	Soviet Union	X	51.96	X	Did not advance			51.96	
