= 1962 European Athletics Championships – Men's 3000 metres steeplechase =

Men's 3000 metres steeplechase at the European Athletics Championships

The men's 3000 metres steeplechase at the 1962 European Athletics Championships was held in Belgrade, then Yugoslavia, at JNA Stadium on 14 and 16 September 1962.

== Medalists ==
Gold	Gaston Roelants; Belgium
Silver	Zoltan Vamoș; Romania
Bronze	Nikolay Sokolov; Soviet Union

== Results ==
=== Final ===
16 September

Rank	Name	Nationality	Time	Notes
1st place, gold medalist(s)	Gaston Roelants	Belgium	8:32.6	CR NR
2nd place, silver medalist(s)	Zoltan Vamoș	Romania	8:37.6	NR
3rd place, bronze medalist(s)	Nikolay Sokolov	Soviet Union	8:40.6	
4	Hermann Bühl	East Germany	8:47.2	
5	Attila Simon	Hungary	8:49.4	
6	Vladimir Yevdokimov	Soviet Union	8:50.8	
7	Guy Texereau	France	8:51.4	
8	Aleksey Konov	Soviet Union	8:52.6	
9	Slavko Špan	Yugoslavia	8:57.2	
10	Esko Siren	Finland	8:59.6	
11	Rainer Dörner	East Germany	9:13.8	
	Maurice Herriott	Great Britain	DNS	

=== Heats ===
14 September

==== Heat 1 ====
Rank	Name	Nationality	Time	Notes
1	Hermann Bühl	East Germany	8:48.2	Q
2	Guy Texereau	France	8:48.8	NR Q
3	Vladimir Yevdokimov	Soviet Union	8:49.2	Q
4	Maurice Herriott	Great Britain		Q
5	Zdzisław Krzyszkowiak	Poland	8:49.8	
6	Miklos Fazekas	Hungary	8:57.6	
7	Ole Ellefsæter	Norway	8:59.8	
8	Georgios Papavasiliou	Greece	9:05.8	
9	Horst Gansel	Austria	9:14.4	
10	Kristleifur Guðbjörnsson	Iceland	9:30.8	

==== Heat 2 ====
Rank	Name	Nationality	Time	Notes
1	Gaston Roelants	Belgium	8:42.0	Q
2	Nikolay Sokolov	Soviet Union	8:46.8	Q
3	Rainer Dörner	East Germany	8:46.8	Q
4	Attila Simon	Hungary	8:50.0	Q
5	Bohumír Zháňal	Czechoslovakia	8:51.6	
6	Franc Hafner	Yugoslavia	8:54.2	
7	Edward Motyl	Poland	8:55.8	
8	Brian Hall	Great Britain	8:57.0	
9	Gianfranco Sommaggio	Italy	9:16.8	

==== Heat 3 ====
Rank	Name	Nationality	Time	Notes
1	Aleksey Konov	Soviet Union	8:43.4	Q
2	Zoltan Vamoș	Romania	8:44.6	Q
3	Slavko Špan	Yugoslavia	8:45.0	Q
4	Esko Siren	Finland	8:46.4	Q
5	Cahit Önel	Turkey	8:47.2	NR
6	David Chapman	Great Britain	8:50.4	
7	Jerzy Chromik	Poland	8:54.0	
8	Ludwig Müller	West Germany	9:00.4	
9	Joaquim Ferreira	Portugal	9:01.8	
10	Jozsef Macsar	Hungary	9:04.6	

== Participation ==
According to an unofficial count, 29 athletes from 19 countries participated in the event.

- Austria (1)
- Belgium (1)
- Czechoslovakia (1)
- East Germany (2)
- Finland (1)
- France (1)
- Greece (1)
- Hungary (3)
- Iceland (1)
- Italy (1)
- Norway (1)
- Poland (3)
- Portugal (1)
- Romania (1)
- Soviet Union (3)
- Turkey (1)
- Great Britain (3)
- West Germany (1)
- Yugoslavia (2)
