= 1958 European Athletics Championships – Men's discus throw =

Men's discus throw at the European Athletics Championships

The men's discus throw at the 1958 European Athletics Championships was held in Stockholm, Sweden, at Stockholms Olympiastadion on 20 and 22 August 1958.

== Medalists ==
| Gold | Edmund Piątkowski; Poland |
| Silver | Todor Artarski; Bulgaria |
| Bronze | Vladimir Trusenyev; Soviet Union |

== Results ==
=== Final ===
22 August

| Rank | Name | Nationality | Result | Notes |
|---|---|---|---|---|
| 1st place, gold medalist(s) | Edmund Piątkowski | Poland | 53.92 | CR |
| 2nd place, silver medalist(s) | Todor Artarski | Bulgaria | 53.82 | |
| 3rd place, bronze medalist(s) | Vladimir Trusenyev | Soviet Union | 53.74 | |
| 4 | Kim Bukhantsev | Soviet Union | 53.44 | |
| 5 | Ferenc Klics | Hungary | 53.08 | |
| 6 | Adolfo Consolini | Italy | 53.05 | |
| 7 | Carol Lindroos | Finland | 51.95 | |
| 8 | József Szécsényi | Hungary | 51.43 | |
| 9 | Pentti Repo | Finland | 51.09 | |
| 10 | Cees Koch | Netherlands | 50.97 | |
| 11 | Gerry Carr | Great Britain | 50.31 | |
| 12 | Dako Radošević | Yugoslavia | 50.00 | |
| 13 | Fritz Kühl | East Germany | 49.44 | |
| 14 | Lars Arvidson | Sweden | 49.27 | |
| 15 | Otto Koppenhöfer | West Germany | 48.42 | |
| 16 | Serge Grisoni | France | 47.13 | |

=== Qualification ===
20 August

| Rank | Name | Nationality | Result | Notes |
|---|---|---|---|---|
| 1 | Edmund Piątkowski | Poland | 52.78 | Q |
| 2 | Kim Bukhantsev | Soviet Union | 50.82 | Q |
| 3 | József Szécsényi | Hungary | 50.79 | Q |
| 4 | Vladimir Trusenyev | Soviet Union | 50.70 | Q |
| 5 | Ferenc Klics | Hungary | 50.28 | Q |
| 6 | Lars Arvidson | Sweden | 50.12 | Q |
| 7 | Pentti Repo | Finland | 49.63 | Q |
| 8 | Otto Koppenhöfer | West Germany | 49.17 | Q |
| 9 | Cees Koch | Netherlands | 49.12 | Q |
| 10 | Todor Artarski | Bulgaria | 49.09 | Q |
| 11 | Adolfo Consolini | Italy | 48.91 | Q |
| 12 | Dako Radošević | Yugoslavia | 48.80 | Q |
| 13 | Carol Lindroos | Finland | 48.66 | Q |
| 14 | Serge Grisoni | France | 48.24 | Q |
| 15 | Gerry Carr | Great Britain | 48.16 | Q |
| 16 | Fritz Kühl | East Germany | 48.02 | Q |
| 17 | Östen Edlund | Sweden | 47.52 | |
| 18 | Stein Haugen | Norway | 46.98 | |
| 19 | Eugeniusz Wachowski | Poland | 46.96 | |
| 20 | Pierre Alard | France | 45.94 | |
| 21 | Hallgrímur Jónsson | Iceland | 45.47 | |

== Participation ==
According to an unofficial count, 21 athletes from 15 countries participated in the event.

- Bulgaria (1)
- East Germany (1)
- Finland (2)
- France (2)
- Hungary (2)
- Iceland (1)
- Italy (1)
- Netherlands (1)
- Norway (1)
- Poland (2)
- Soviet Union (2)
- Sweden (2)
- Great Britain (1)
- West Germany (1)
- Yugoslavia (1)
