= 1958 European Athletics Championships – Men's 3000 metres steeplechase =

Men's 3000 metres steeplechase at the European Athletics Championships

The men's 3000 metres steeplechase at the 1958 European Athletics Championships was held in Stockholm, Sweden, at Stockholms Olympiastadion on 20 and 22 August 1958.

== Medalists ==
Gold	Jerzy Chromik; Poland
Silver	Semyon Rzhishchin; Soviet Union
Bronze	Hans Hüneke; West Germany

== Results ==
=== Final ===
22 August

Rank	Name	Nationality	Time	Notes
1st place, gold medalist(s)	Jerzy Chromik	Poland	8:38.2	CR
2nd place, silver medalist(s)	Semyon Rzhishchin	Soviet Union	8:38.8	
3rd place, bronze medalist(s)	Hans Hüneke	West Germany	8:43.6	
4	Sergey Ponomaryev	Soviet Union	8:44.0	
5	Vlastimil Brlica	Czechoslovakia	8:46.6	
6	Gyula Varga	Hungary	8:48.4	
7	Lars Helander	Sweden	8:50.2	
8	Georgios Papavasiliou	Greece	8:51.2	NR
9	Olavi Rinteenpää	Finland	8:52.6	
10	Reidar Næss	Norway	8:54.6	
11	Hermann Bühl	East Germany	9:03.0	
12	Bohumír Zháňal	Czechoslovakia	9:24.4	

=== Heats ===
20 August

==== Heat 1 ====
Rank	Name	Nationality	Time	Notes
1	Semyon Rzhishchin	Soviet Union	8:47.6	CR Q
2	Vlastimil Brlica	Czechoslovakia	8:47.6	CR Q
3	Jerzy Chromik	Poland	8:49.2	Q
4	Hans Hüneke	West Germany	8:50.6	Q
5	Olavi Rinteenpää	Finland	8:53.0	Q
6	Reidar Næss	Norway	8:53.6	Q
7	Manuel Alonso	Spain	8:56.2	NR
8	Hedwig Leenaert	Belgium	9:09.6	
9	Eric Shirley	Great Britain	9:17.2	

==== Heat 2 ====
Rank	Name	Nationality	Time	Notes
1	Georgios Papavasiliou	Greece	8:55.4	Q
2	Sergey Ponomaryev	Soviet Union	8:56.2	Q
3	Gyula Varga	Hungary	8:59.8	Q
4	Hermann Bühl	East Germany	9:01.8	Q
5	Lars Helander	Sweden	9:04.8	Q
6	Bohumír Zháňal	Czechoslovakia	9:09.4	Q
7	Walter Kammermann	Switzerland	9:17.2	

== Participation ==
According to an unofficial count, 16 athletes from 14 countries participated in the event.

- Belgium (1)
- Czechoslovakia (2)
- East Germany (1)
- Finland (1)
- Greece (1)
- Hungary (1)
- Norway (1)
- Poland (1)
- Soviet Union (2)
- Spain (1)
- Sweden (1)
- Switzerland (1)
- Great Britain (1)
- West Germany (1)
