= 1966 European Athletics Championships – Men's discus throw =

Men's discus throw at the European Athletics Championships

The men's discus throw at the 1966 European Athletics Championships was held in Budapest, Hungary, at Népstadion on 30 and 31 August 1966.

The winning margin was 8 cm which with the conclusion of the 2024 championships remains the only time the men's discus throw has been won by less than 10 cm at these championships.

== Medalists ==
Gold	Detlef Thorith; East Germany
Silver	Hartmut Losch; East Germany
Bronze	Lothar Milde; East Germany

== Results ==
=== Final ===
31 August

Rank	Name	Nationality	Result	Notes
1st place, gold medalist(s)	Detlef Thorith	East Germany	57.42	
2nd place, silver medalist(s)	Hartmut Losch	East Germany	57.34	
3rd place, bronze medalist(s)	Lothar Milde	East Germany	56.80	
4	Edmund Piątkowski	Poland	56.76	
5	Ludvík Daněk	Czechoslovakia	56.24	
6	Silvano Simeon	Italy	55.96	
7	Zenon Begier	Poland	55.94	
8	Jiří Žemba	Czechoslovakia	54.20	
9	Vytautas Jaras	Soviet Union	53.98	
10	Heimo Reinitzer	Austria	53.72	
11	Hein-Direck Neu	West Germany	53.66	
12	Ernst Soudek	Austria	53.46	

=== Qualification ===
30 August

Rank	Name	Nationality	Result	Notes
1	Vytautas Jaras	Soviet Union	57.54	CR Q
2	Ludvík Daněk	Czechoslovakia	56.86	Q
3	Edmund Piątkowski	Poland	56.74	Q
4	Lothar Milde	East Germany	56.70	Q
5	Detlef Thorith	East Germany	56.42	Q
6	Hartmut Losch	East Germany	55.84	Q
7	Zenon Begier	Poland	55.30	Q
8	Ernst Soudek	Austria	54.38	Q
9	Hein-Direck Neu	West Germany	54.32	Q
10	Jiří Žemba	Czechoslovakia	54.22	Q
11	Silvano Simeon	Italy	54.20	Q
12	Heimo Reinitzer	Austria	54.08	Q
13	Flavio Asta	Italy	53.60	
14	Géza Fejér	Hungary	53.22	
15	Jens Reimers	West Germany	53.02	
16	Vladimir Trusenyev	Soviet Union	53.02	
17	János Faragó	Hungary	52.84	
18	Lars Haglund	Sweden	51.06	
19	Erik Uddebom	Sweden	50.96	
20	Alain Drufin	France	49.84	
21	Bill Tancred	Great Britain	48.36	
22	Georgios Tsakanikas	Greece	47.96	
23	Marcel Hertogs	Belgium	47.36	
24	Ramazan Driza	Albania	45.18	

== Participation ==
According to an unofficial count, 24 athletes from 14 countries participated in the event.

- Albania (1)
- Austria (2)
- Belgium (1)
- Czechoslovakia (2)
- East Germany (3)
- France (1)
- Greece (1)
- Hungary (2)
- Italy (2)
- Poland (2)
- Soviet Union (2)
- Sweden (2)
- Great Britain (1)
- West Germany (2)
