= Athletics at the 1965 Summer Universiade – Men's discus throw =

The men's discus throw event at the 1965 Summer Universiade was held at the People's Stadium in Budapest on 27 August 1965.

== Medalists ==
Gold	Silver	Bronze
Lars Haglund; Sweden	Jiří Žemba; Czechoslovakia	George Puce; Canada

== Results ==
=== Qualification ===
Rank	Group	Name	Nationality	Result	Notes
1	?	Lars Haglund	Sweden	54.72	Q
2	?	Jiří Žemba	Czechoslovakia	54.60	Q
3	?	George Puce	Canada	53.46	Q
4	?	Ernst Soudek	Austria	52.72	Q
5	?	Géza Fejér	Hungary	50.32	Q
6	?	Heimo Reinitzer	Austria	49.98	Q
7	?	Gabriel Kladek	Czechoslovakia	49.40	Q
8	?	Gaetano Dalla Pria	Italy	48.88	Q
9	?	Georgi Damyanov	Bulgaria	48.60	Q
10	?	Hein-Direck Neu	West Germany	48.42	Q
11	?	Gilberto Ferrini	Italy	48.22	Q
12	?	Maciej Obuchowicz	Poland	47.18	Q
12	?	Dennis Roscoe	Great Britain	47.18	Q
14	?	John Hillier	Great Britain	47.06	Q
15	?	Jacques Nyss	France	46.38	Q
16	?	János Faragó	Hungary	46.18	Q
17	?	Cláudio Romanini	Brazil	44.44	
18	?	Henryk Wieprzycki	Poland	43.12	
19	?	Alberto Rosario	Portugal	40.18	
	?	Guy Fichelle	France	NM	

=== Final ===
Rank	Name	Nationality	Result	Notes
1st place, gold medalist(s)	Lars Haglund	Sweden	57.86	
2nd place, silver medalist(s)	Jiří Žemba	Czechoslovakia	56.22	
3rd place, bronze medalist(s)	George Puce	Canada	56.20	
4	Ernst Soudek	Austria	55.12	
5	Géza Fejér	Hungary	53.20	
6	Heimo Reinitzer	Austria	51.90	
7	Gabriel Kladek	Czechoslovakia	53.00	
8	Gaetano Dalla Pria	Italy	51.70	
9	Georgi Damyanov	Bulgaria	51.42	
10	Hein-Direck Neu	West Germany	50.92	
11	Gilberto Ferrini	Italy	50.10	
12	Maciej Obuchowicz	Poland	49.36	
13	Dennis Roscoe	Great Britain	48.88	
14	John Hillier	Great Britain	47.44	
15	Jacques Nyss	France	46.92	
16	János Faragó	Hungary	46.30	
