= Athletics at the 1962 World Festival of Youth and Students =

The 8th World Festival of Youth and Students featured an athletics competition among its programme of events. Organised under the Union Internationale des Étudiants (UIE), the events were contested in Helsinki, Finland in August 1962. Mainly contested among Eastern European athletes, it served as an alternative to the Universiade. It was the final time that a major international athletics competition was incorporated into the festival, as athletics at the Universiade grew to be the most prominent student athletics venue for both Western and Eastern-aligned countries.

== Medal summary ==
=== Men ===
Event	Gold		Silver		Bronze	
100 metres	Edvin Ozolin (URS)	10.5	Vilém Mandlík (TCH)	10.6	Mikhail Bachvarov (BUL)	10.7
200 metres	Vilém Mandlík (TCH)	21.3	Edvin Ozolin (URS)	21.6	Eduard Lomtadze (URS)	22.1
400 metres	Viktor Lyubimov (URS)	49.6	Zdenek Mateyka (TCH)	49.7	Keijo Ceder (FIN)	50.4
800 metres	Josef Odložil (TCH)	1:51.4	Vasiliy Savinkov (URS)	1:51.5	István Rózsavölgyi (HUN)	1:52.8
1500 metres	Witold Baran (POL)	3:43.6	Tomáš Salinger (TCH)	3:51.6	Zoltan Vamoș (ROM)	3:52.2
5000 metres	Pyotr Bolotnikov (URS)	13:50.6	Aleksey Konov (URS)	14:03.7	Zoltan Vamoș (ROM)	14:10.6
110 m hurdles	Viktor Balikhin (URS)	14.7	Jan Toman (TCH)	15.2	Pekka Harjunpää (FIN)	15.4
4 × 100 m relay	Soviet Union (URS)	41.7	Czechoslovakia (TCH)	42.4	Bulgaria (BUL)	43.8
4 × 400 m relay	Czechoslovakia (TCH)	3:17.7	Soviet Union (URS)	3:17.8	Mongolia (MGL)	3:34.0
High jump	Valeriy Brumel (URS)	2.22 m	Evgeni Yordanov (BUL)	2.00 m	Eugen Ducu (ROM)	2.00 m
Pole vault	Rudolf Tomášek (TCH)	4.45 m	Włodzimierz Osiński (POL)	4.20 m	Jan Odvárka (TCH)	4.20 m
Long jump	Igor Ter-Ovanesyan (URS)	7.93 m	Todor Dashkov (BUL)	7.29 m	Andrzej Stalmach (POL)	7.25 m
Triple jump	Artur Szczepański (POL)	15.34 m	Andrzej Stalmach (POL)	14.15 m	Slim Hayouni (TUN)	13.76 m
Shot put	Vilmos Varjú (HUN)	18.81 m	Edmund Piątkowski (POL)	16.38 m	Vladimir Trusenyov (URS)	16.00 m
Discus throw	Edmund Piątkowski (POL)	57.37 m	Vladimir Trusenyov (URS)	57.28 m	József Szécsényi (HUN)	56.62 m
Javelin throw	Jānis Lūsis (URS)	78.80 m	Janusz Sidło (POL)	72.59 m	Pauli Kalliorinne (FIN)	68.31 m

=== Women ===
Event	Gold		Silver		Bronze	
100 metres	Ana Besuan (ROM)	12.4	Mariya Knyayetsina (URS)	12.4	Elżbieta Twardowska (POL)	12.5
400 metres	Tsvetana Isaeva (BUL)	57.9	Jarmila Popelková (TCH)	58.1	Florica Grecescu (ROM)	58.3
800 metres	Florica Grecescu (ROM)	2:10.3	Jarmila Popelková (TCH)	2:11.3	Tsvetana Isaeva (BUL)	2:17.4
80 m hurdles	Irina Press (URS)	10.9	Teresa Ciepły (POL)	11.0	Liliya Makoshina (URS)	11.1
4 × 100 m relay	Soviet Union (URS)	47.4	Poland (POL)	47.7	Finland (FIN)	52.0
High jump	Iolanda Balaș (ROM)	1.84 m	Galina Yesukova (URS)	1.65 m	Liisa Oksava (FIN)	1.45 m
Long jump	Tatyana Shchelkanova (URS)	6.59 m	Diana Yorgova (BUL)	5.99 m	Olga Borangic (ROM)	5.89 m
Shot put	Tamara Press (URS)	16.96 m	Irina Press (URS)	16.12 m	Ivanka Khristova (BUL)	15.18 m
Discus throw	Tamara Press (URS)	54.59 m	Jolán Kontsek (HUN)	53.97 m	Verzhinia Mikhailova (BUL)	51.84 m
Javelin throw	Elvīra Ozoliņa (URS)	56.42 m	Maria Diaconescu (ROM)	51.02 m	Margarita Baltakova (BUL)	46.73 m

== Medal table ==
Rank	Nation	Gold	Silver	Bronze	Total
1	Soviet Union (URS)	14	8	3	25
2	Czechoslovakia (TCH)	4	7	1	12
3	Poland (POL)	3	6	2	11
4	Romania (ROM)	3	1	5	9
5	Bulgaria (BUL)	1	3	6	10
6	Hungary (HUN)	1	1	2	4
7	Finland (FIN)	0	0	5	5
8	Mongolia (MGL)	0	0	1	1
8	Tunisia (TUN)	0	0	1	1
Totals (9 entries)		26	26	26	78

== See also ==
- FISU World University Games § Precursors
- University and college sport
