= Edmund Piątkowski =

Polish discus thrower (1936–2016)

Personal information
- Nationality: Polish
- Born: 31 January 1936 Florentynów, Poland
- Died: 28 March 2016 (aged 86) Poland

Sport
- Event: Discus throw
Medal record
Men's athletics
Representing Poland
European Championships
Gold medal – first place	1958 Stockholm	Discus throw
Universiade
Gold medal – first place	1961 Sofia	Discus throw

Edmund Piątkowski (31 January 1936 – 28 March 2016) was a Polish track and field athlete, who competed in the discus event.

Piątkowski was multiple time Polish champion in the discus (1955, 1957–66, 1968–69). He participated in four European Championships in Athletics (1958, 1962, 1966, 1969), and three Olympic Games (1960, 1964, 1968).

In 1958, he won the gold medal at the 6th European Championships in Stockholm. In May 1959, he broke the European record (57.89); afterward in June 1959, he set the world record (59.91) at the Kusociński Memorial meet in Warsaw. Two years later, in August 1961, he yet again topped the European record (60.47) in Łódź.

In 1960, Piątkowski took 5th place in the 17th Olympic Games at Rome. In 1962, he took 4th at Belgrade (7th EU-ch). In 1964, he took 7th at Tokyo (18th Ol). In 1966, he took 4th at Budapest (8th EU-ch). In 1967, he won at Kiev (2nd European Cup). In 1968, he took 7th at Mexico City (19th Ol). In 1969, he took 12th at Athens (9th EU-ch). He died on 28 March 2016 at the age of 80.

== International competitions ==
Year	Competition	Venue	Position	Event	Notes
Representing Poland
1957	World Festival of Youth and Students	Moscow, Soviet Union	3rd	Discus throw	52.19 m
1958	European Championships	Stockholm, Sweden	1st	Discus throw	53.92 m
1959	World Festival of Youth and Students	Vienna, Austria	1st	Discus throw	57.87 m
1960	Olympic Games	Rome, Italy	5th	Discus throw	55.12 m
1961	Universiade	Sofia, Bulgaria	1st	Discus throw	59.15 m
1962	World Festival of Youth and Students	Helsinki, Finland	2nd	Shot put	16.38 m
1962	World Festival of Youth and Students	Helsinki, Finland	1st	Discus throw	57.37 m
1962	European Championships	Belgrade, Yugoslavia	4th	Discus throw	55.13 m
1964	Olympic Games	Tokyo, Japan	7th	Discus throw	55.81 m
1966	European Championships	Budapest, Hungary	4th	Discus throw	56.76 m
1967	European Cup Final	Kiev, Soviet Union	1st	Discus throw	59.10 m
1968	Olympic Games	Mexico City, Mexico	7th	Discus throw	59.40 m
1969	European Championships	Athens, Greece	12th	Discus throw	53.64 m

== Personal bests ==
- Shot put – 18.05
- Discus throw – 61.12 (1967)

Records
Preceded by (United States) Fortune Gordien	Men's Discus World Record Holder; 14 June 1959 – 12 August 1960	Succeeded by (United States) Rink Babka
Preceded by (Italy) Adolfo Consolini	Men's Discus European Record Holder; 10 May 1959 – 7 June 1959	Succeeded by (Hungary) József Szécsényi
Preceded by (Hungary) József Szécsényi	Men's Discus European Record Holder; 14 June 1959 – 4 June 1962	Succeeded by (Soviet Union) Vladimir Trusenyev
