= Athletics at the 1961 Summer Universiade – Men's 5000 metres =

The men's 5000 metres event at the 1961 Summer Universiade was held at the Vasil Levski National Stadium in Sofia, Bulgaria, in September 1961.

== Results ==
| Rank | Athlete | Nationality | Time | Notes |
|---|---|---|---|---|
| 1st place, gold medalist(s) | János Pintér | Hungary | 14:23.4 | |
| 2nd place, silver medalist(s) | Andrei Barabás | Romania | 14:23.8 | |
| 3rd place, bronze medalist(s) | Peter Kubicki | West Germany | 14:23.8 | |
| 4 | Aleksey Konov | Soviet Union | 14:23.8 | |
| 5 | Saburo Yokomizo | Japan | 14:28.0 | |
| 6 | Béla Szekeres | Hungary | 14:30.0 | |
| 7 | Jaroslav Bohatý | Czechoslovakia | 14:36.8 | |
| 8 | Edward Owczarek | Poland | 14:40.4 | |
| 9 | Tereo Funai | Japan | 14:44.8 | |
| 10 | Ivan Peyev | Bulgaria | 15:09.8 | |
| 11 | Michael Turner | Great Britain | 15:21.4 | |
| 12 | Boris Ivanov | Bulgaria | 15:24.0 | |
| 13 | Östen Bergman | Sweden | 15:37.8 | |
| 14 | Gurnam Singh | Indonesia | 15:54.5 | |
