= Athletics at the 1966 British Empire and Commonwealth Games – Men's shot put =

Men's shot put at the 1966 British Empire and Commonwealth Games
- Venue: Independence Park, Kingston
- Dates: August 11, 1966

Medalists
| gold medal | Dave Steen | Canada |
| silver medal | Les Mills | New Zealand |
| bronze medal | George Puce | Canada |

The men's shot put event at the 1966 British Empire and Commonwealth Games was held on 11 August at the Independence Park in Kingston, Jamaica.

== Results ==
Final results
| Rank | Name | Nationality | Distance | Notes |
|---|---|---|---|---|
| 1st place, gold medalist(s) | Dave Steen | Canada | 61 ft 8 in (18.80 m) | |
| 2nd place, silver medalist(s) | Les Mills | New Zealand | 60 ft 3 1/4 in (18.37 m) | |
| 3rd place, bronze medalist(s) | George Puce | Canada | 56 ft 2 3/4 in (17.14 m) | |
| 4 | Mike Lindsay | Scotland | 55 ft 10 1/2 in (17.03 m) | |
| 5 | Robert Hargreaves | New Zealand | 53 ft 11 in (16.43 m) | |
| 6 | Robin Tait | New Zealand | 53 ft 9 1/2 in (16.40 m) | |
| 7 | Roy Hollingsworth | Trinidad and Tobago | 49 ft 11 1/2 in (15.23 m) | |
| 8 | Bill Tancred | England | 48 ft 11 3/4 in (14.93 m) | |
| 9 | William Barrow | Antigua and Barbuda | 47 ft 7 1/2 in (14.52 m) | |
| 10 | Zenon Andrusyshyn | Canada | 47 ft 5 in (14.45 m) | |
| 11 | Ainsley Roost | Canada | 46 ft 6 1/4 in (14.18 m) | |
| 12 | John Rolle | Bahamas | 45 ft 5 in (13.84 m) | |
| 13 | William Hall | Jamaica | 43 ft 3 1/2 in (13.20 m) | |
| | Nashathar Singh | Malaysia | DNS | |
| | Clive Longe | Wales | DNS | |
