= Athletics at the 1966 British Empire and Commonwealth Games – Men's discus throw =

Men's discus throw at the 1966 British Empire and Commonwealth Games
- Venue: Independence Park, Kingston
- Dates: August 8, 1966

Medalists
gold medal	Les Mills	New Zealand
silver medal	George Puce	Canada
bronze medal	Robin Tait	New Zealand

The men's discus throw event at the 1966 British Empire and Commonwealth Games was held on 8 August at the Independence Park in Kingston, Jamaica.

== Results ==
Final results
Rank	Name	Nationality	Distance	Notes
1st place, gold medalist(s)	Les Mills	New Zealand	184 ft 4 in (56.19 m)	
2nd place, silver medalist(s)	George Puce	Canada	183 ft 6 in (55.94 m)	
3rd place, bronze medalist(s)	Robin Tait	New Zealand	180 ft 6 in (55.02 m)	
4	Dave Steen	Canada	177 ft 11 in (54.24 m)	
5	Roy Hollingsworth	Trinidad and Tobago	176 ft 11 in (53.93 m)	
6	Mike Lindsay	Scotland	165 ft 1 in (50.32 m)	
7	Ainsley Roost	Canada	163 ft 1 in (49.72 m)	
8	Praveen Kumar	India	160 ft 8 in (48.98 m)	
9	Bill Tancred	England	160 ft 4 in (48.88 m)	
10	Patrick Anukwa	Nigeria	155 ft 10 in (47.51 m)	
11	Phillip Otieno	Kenya	149 ft 7 in (45.60 m)	
12	Muhammad Ayub	Pakistan	149 ft 1 in (45.45 m)	
13	Winston Burt	Jamaica	146 ft 8 in (44.71 m)	
14	Zenon Andrusyshyn	Canada	144 ft 7 in (44.08 m)	
15	Cecil Hylton	Jamaica	144 ft 6 in (44.05 m)	
	Clive Longe	Wales	DNS	
