= Kim Byeong-gi =

Kim Byeong-gi or Kim Pyŏng-ki (김병기) may refer to:

- Kim Byeong-gi (Sayeong) (1818—1875), Joseon nobleman and politician from the New Andong Kim clan
- Kim Byeong-gi (discus thrower) (born 1938), South Korean athlete
- Kim Byung-ki (born 1948), South Korean actor
- Kim Byung-kee (born 1961), South Korean politician
