= Shohei Kaneko =

Japanese discus thrower (1937–2006)

Personal information
- Nationality: Japanese
- Born: 10 August 1937
- Died: July 31, 2006 (aged 68)

Sport
- Sport: Athletics
- Event: Discus throw

Shohei Kaneko (金子 宗平, Kaneko Shōhei; 10 August 1937 – 31 July 2006) was a Japanese track and field athlete. He competed in the men's discus throw at the 1964 Summer Olympics.
