= Athletics at the 1960 Summer Olympics – Men's 3000 metres steeplechase =

Men's 3000 metres steeplechase at the Games of the XVII Olympiad
- Venue: Olympic Stadium
- Dates: September 1, 1960 (heats); September 3, 1960 (final)
- Competitors: 32 from 20 nations
- Winning time: 8:34.30 OR

Medalists
1st place, gold medalist(s)		Zdzisław Krzyszkowiak; Poland
2nd place, silver medalist(s)		Nikolay Sokolov; Soviet Union
3rd place, bronze medalist(s)		Semyon Rzhishchin; Soviet Union

The men's 3000 metres steeplechase event at the 1960 Olympic Games took place between September 1 and September 3.

== Results ==
=== Heats ===
The fastest three steeplechasers in each of the three heats advanced to the final round.

Heat one

Rank	Name	Nationality	Time	Notes
1	Nikolay Sokolov	Soviet Union	8:43.56	
2	Gunnar Tjörnebo	Sweden	8:48.77	
3	Hans Hüneke	United Team of Germany	8:50.59	
4	Georgios Papavasileiou	Greece	8:51.46	
5	Phil Coleman	United States	8:56.72	
6	Vlastimil Brlica	Czechoslovakia	9:00.07	
7	Attila Simon	Hungary	9:02.79	
8	Guy Texereau	France	9:04.23	
9	Walter Kammermann	Switzerland	9:11.8	
10	Eric Shirley	Great Britain	9:14.8	
11	Joaquim Ferreira	Portugal	9:30.2	
	Balkrishan Singh	India	DNS	

Heat two

Rank	Name	Nationality	Time	Notes
1	Zdzisław Krzyszkowiak	Poland	8:49.92	
2	Ludwig Müller	United Team of Germany	8:49.86	
3	Aleksey Konov	Soviet Union	8:50.19	
4	George Young	United States	8:50.93	
5	Bohumír Zháňal	Czechoslovakia	8:53.01	
6	Dave Chapman	Great Britain	8:53.24	
7	Pentti Karvonen	Finland	9:04.91	
8	José Fernández	Spain	9:12.8	
9	Mubarak Shah	Pakistan	9:20.0	
10	Alfredo Tinoco	Mexico	9:38.0	
	Walter Steinbach	Austria	DNS	

Heat three

Rank	Name	Nationality	Time	Notes
1	Semyon Rzhishchin	Soviet Union	8:48.11	
2	Deacon Jones	United States	8:49.32	
3	Gaston Roelants	Belgium	8:49.52	
4	Hermann Buhl	United Team of Germany	8:49.56	
5	Lage Tedenby	Sweden	8:52.94	
6	Franc Hafner	Yugoslavia	8:55.68	
7	Jerzy Chromik	Poland	9:06.68	
8	Michael Palmer	Great Britain	9:10.68	
9	Gerhart Hecker	Hungary	9:12.4	
10	Cahit Önel	Turkey	9:14.6	
11	Mohamed Lahcen	Morocco	9:29.4	
	Sebastião Mendes	Brazil	DNS	

=== Final ===
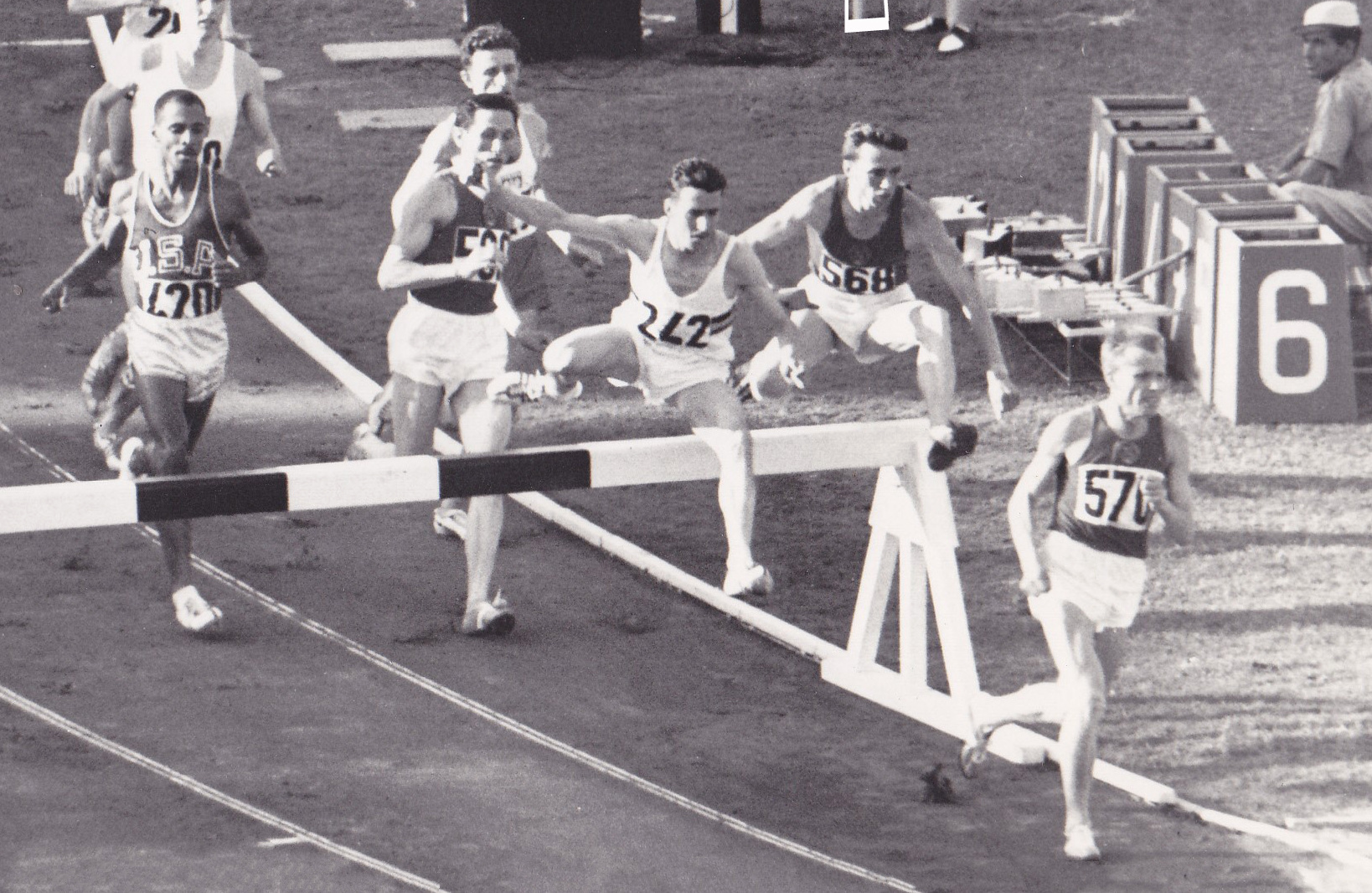
3000 m steeplechase final. Sokolov (#570) is in the lead, chased by Roelants (#242), Rzhishchin (#568) and Konov. Jones (#420) is on the left

Rank	Name	Nationality	Time	Notes
1st place, gold medalist(s)	Zdzisław Krzyszkowiak	Poland	8:34.30	OR
2nd place, silver medalist(s)	Nikolay Sokolov	Soviet Union	8:36.55	
3rd place, bronze medalist(s)	Semyon Rzhishchin	Soviet Union	8:42.34	
4	Gaston Roelants	Belgium	8:47.45	
5	Gunnar Tjörnebo	Sweden	8:58.87	
6	Ludwig Müller	United Team of Germany	9:01.57	
7	Deacon Jones	United States	9:18.22	
8	Aleksey Konov	Soviet Union	9:18.23	
-	Hans Hüneke	United Team of Germany		DNF

Key: OR = Olympic record; DNF = did not finish
