= Detlef Thorith =

East German discus thrower (1942–2019)

Personal information
- Born: 27 September 1942 Köslin, Germany
- Died: 18 July 2019 (aged 76) Frankfurt
- Height: 1.90 m (6 ft 3 in)
- Weight: 105 kg (231 lb)

Sport
- Country: East Germany
- Sport: athletics
- Event: Discus throw
- Club: SC Dynamo Berlin

Achievements and titles
- Personal best: 64.82 m (1972)
Medal record
Men's athletics
Representing East Germany
European Championships
Gold medal – first place	1966 Budapest	Discus throw

Detlev Thorith (27 September 1942 – 18 July 2019) was an East German discus thrower. He was born in Köslin. He started for the Sportvereinigung (SV) Dynamo. He competed in the men's discus throw at the 1972 Summer Olympics.
