= Georgina Falú =

- Born: April 23, 1939 (age 87); Santurce, Puerto Rico
- Other name: Georgina Falú Pesante
- Education: University of Puerto Rico, Río Piedras Campus (BA '61); UC Berkeley (MBA '64); Columbia University (MA, Ed.D '83)
- Spouse: Roy Hollingsworth
- Relatives: 11, including Malín

Georgina Falú Pesante (born April 23, 1939) is an Afro–Puerto Rican university executive, community organizer, professor, and Pan-Africanist.

== Early life and education ==
Falú was born on April 23, 1939 in Puerto Rico to María Magdalena “Malen” Pesante Santana and Juan “Juanín” Falú Zarzuela. She was one of eleven children, including Malín Falú. Juanin Falú was a civil servant who founded the League to Promote the Advancement of Blacks in Puerto Rico. Juanin's father, Pedro Falú, was the first Afro-Puerto Rican Santurce Municipal Assembly president. In 2009, Falú traced her lineage to Senegal’s Falú clan.

Falú attended Pedro Gerónimo Goyco Elementary and Central High School, graduating in 1957. In 1961, she graduated from University of Puerto Rico, Río Piedras Campus (UPR-RP) with her BA in accounting, and went on to get an MBA from UC Berkeley (1964). She later earned her MA and Ed.D. in Higher Education Finances from Columbia University (1980-1983). She also attended the Harvard Graduate School of Business (1970).

In 1969, Falú married Roy A. Hollingsworth., with whom she had one son, Rey Hollingsworth Falú.

== Career in academia ==
Falú began her academic career working at the UPR-RP in 1961. In 1972, she was appointed dean of the UPR-RP College of Business, making her the first Black person, woman, and youngest appointed person in the position.

Falú continued working at other academic institutions throughout the 1970's and 1980s. In 1972, Falú became the first Black person, woman, and youngest appointed UPR-RP College of Business dean. She worked at Baruch College from 1975-1976 and then became the first woman to serve as vice president of administration at Union Theological Seminary (1976-1979). She taught at SUNY-Old Westbury (1980-1995) and served as a dean of Touro College in 1986. She later worked at City College of New York as an Adjunct Professor in the Black Studies Department Falú created the country's first university course with "Afro-Latinos" in the title.

== Community and Pan-Africanist work ==
In 1984, Falú met kemetaphysician Dr. Yosef ben-Jochannan, who encouraged her to explore her African heritage.

In 1988, Falú sold her home in El Señoral, Puerto Rico and founded the Universal Business and Media School in Spanish Harlem. She was the first Afro-Puerto Rican woman to own an accredited US business school. The school ran through 2001, when it was closed as the state Department of Education was investigating it for violations.

In 1988, Falú also founded the Falú Foundation to serve low-income communities and engage in African diaspora history. The Falú Foundation also translates popular titles into Spanish and provides scholarships to minorities and encourages the development of minority-owned businesses, and runs technology program for the community.

In 1994, she organized the first annual Silicon Barrio conference. This conference focused on bringing more Hispanic workers into the information technology industries.

In 2005, Falú founded the AFROLAA Project (Afro-Latinos of the Americas) to help Spanish-speaking Afro-descendants learn about their African heritage. In 2014, she cofounded the Elombe Brath Foundation. She also created the upper Manhattan community's first Internet center.

Between 2015 and 2018, Falú organized the first Puerto Rican Afro-descendant Congresses. She is a member of the World African Diaspora Union and active in the African Strategic and Peace Research Group (AFSTRAG).

== Awards ==
- 1974: Woman of the Year in Education, Puerto Rican Chamber of Commerce
- 1999: Seventh Annual Women's History Month Awards Ceremony, Inner City Women's Committee
- 2014: Woman of Distinction, New York State Senate
- 2018: Featured in Latin Roots East Harlem Exhibition
