= Hans Hüneke =

German middle-distance runner

Personal information
- Full name: Johannes Ernst "Hans" Hüneke
- Nationality: German
- Born: 12 January 1934 Schwalenberg, Germany
- Died: 14 August 2015 (aged 81) Dernbach, Germany

Sport
- Sport: Middle-distance running
- Event: Steeplechase
Medal record
Men's athletics
Representing West Germany
European Championships
Bronze medal – third place	1958 Stockholm	3000 m st.

Johannes Ernst "Hans" Hüneke (12 January 1934 – 14 August 2015) was a German middle-distance runner. He competed in the men's 3000 metres steeplechase at the 1960 Summer Olympics.
