= Israel at the 1964 Summer Olympics =

- IOC code: ISR
- NOC: Olympic Committee of Israel

in Tokyo
- Competitors: 10 in 3 sports
- Flag bearer: Gideon Ariel
- Medals: Gold 0 Silver 0 Bronze 0 Total 0

Summer Olympics appearances (overview)
- 1952; 1956; 1960; 1964; 1968; 1972; 1976; 1980; 1984; 1988; 1992; 1996; 2000; 2004; 2008; 2012; 2016; 2020; 2024

Israel competed at the 1964 Summer Olympics in Tokyo, Japan.

== Results by event ==
=== Athletics ===
Gideon Ariel

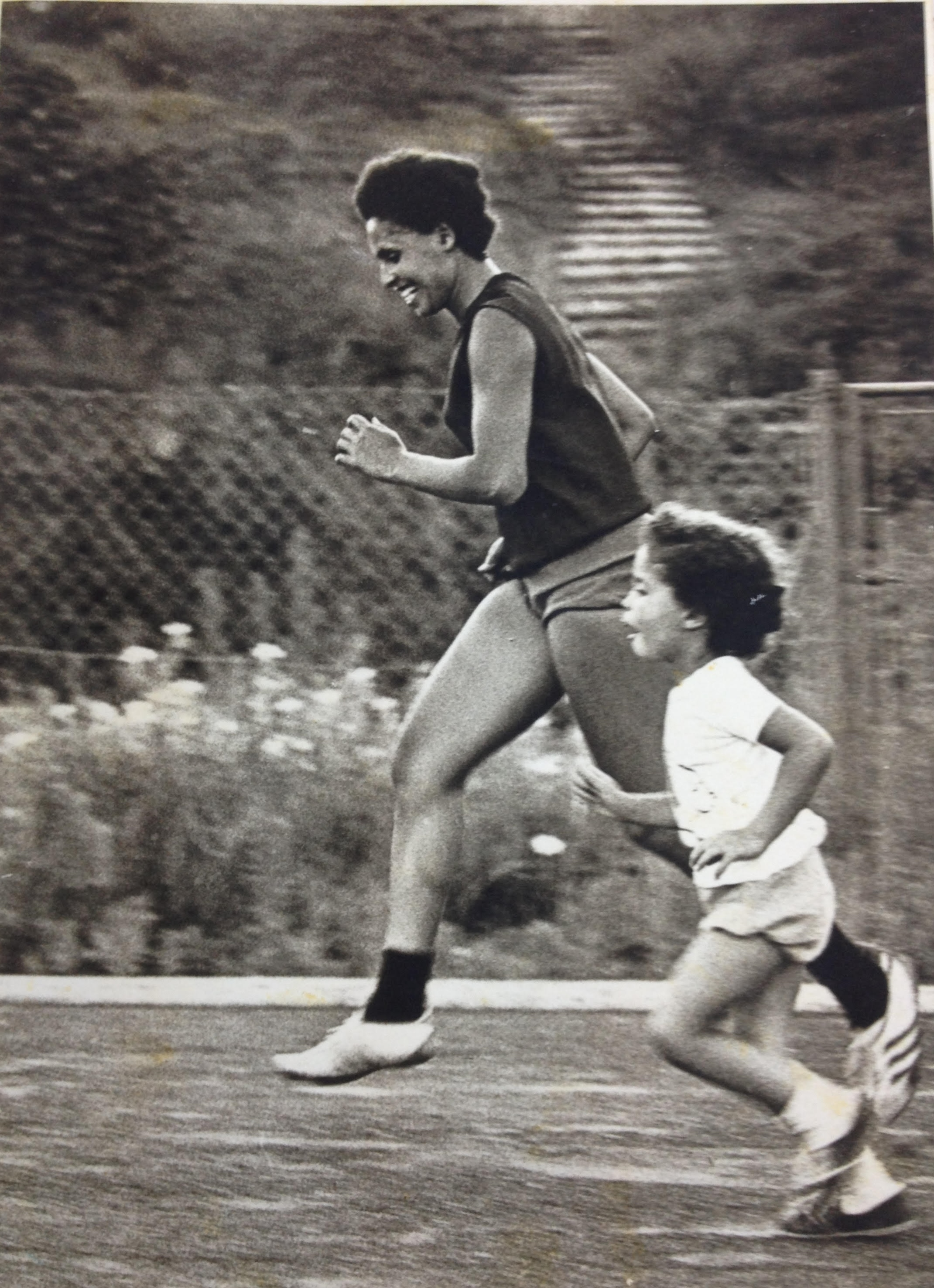
Miriam Siderenski running with her daughter

Event	Participant	Result	Ref
Men's Discus Throw	Gideon Ariel	26th	
Men's 800 metres	Amos Gilad	DNF; Achilles tendon rupture	
Women's High Jump	Michal Lamdani	19th (tied)	
Women's 100 metres; Women's 200 metres	Miriam Siderenski	6th in Heat 3; 4th in Heat 4	
Men's 100 metres	Levi Psavkin	7th in Heat 5	

=== Shooting ===
Three shooters represented Israel in 1964.

Event	Participant	Result	Ref
Men's trap	Maksim Kahan	47th	
Men's 50 metre rifle, prone	Nehemia Sirkis	47th	
Men's Small-Bore Rifle, Three Positions, 50 metres; Men's 50 metre rifle, prone	Hannan Crystal	36th; 63rd	

=== Swimming ===
Event	Participant	Result	Ref
Men's 200 metre Butterfly	Avraham Melamed	5th in Heat 2	
Men's 200 metre Breaststroke; Men's 400 metre Individual Medley	Gershon Shefa	5th in Heat 4; 7th in Heat 1	
