= Brodek u Přerova =

- Market town
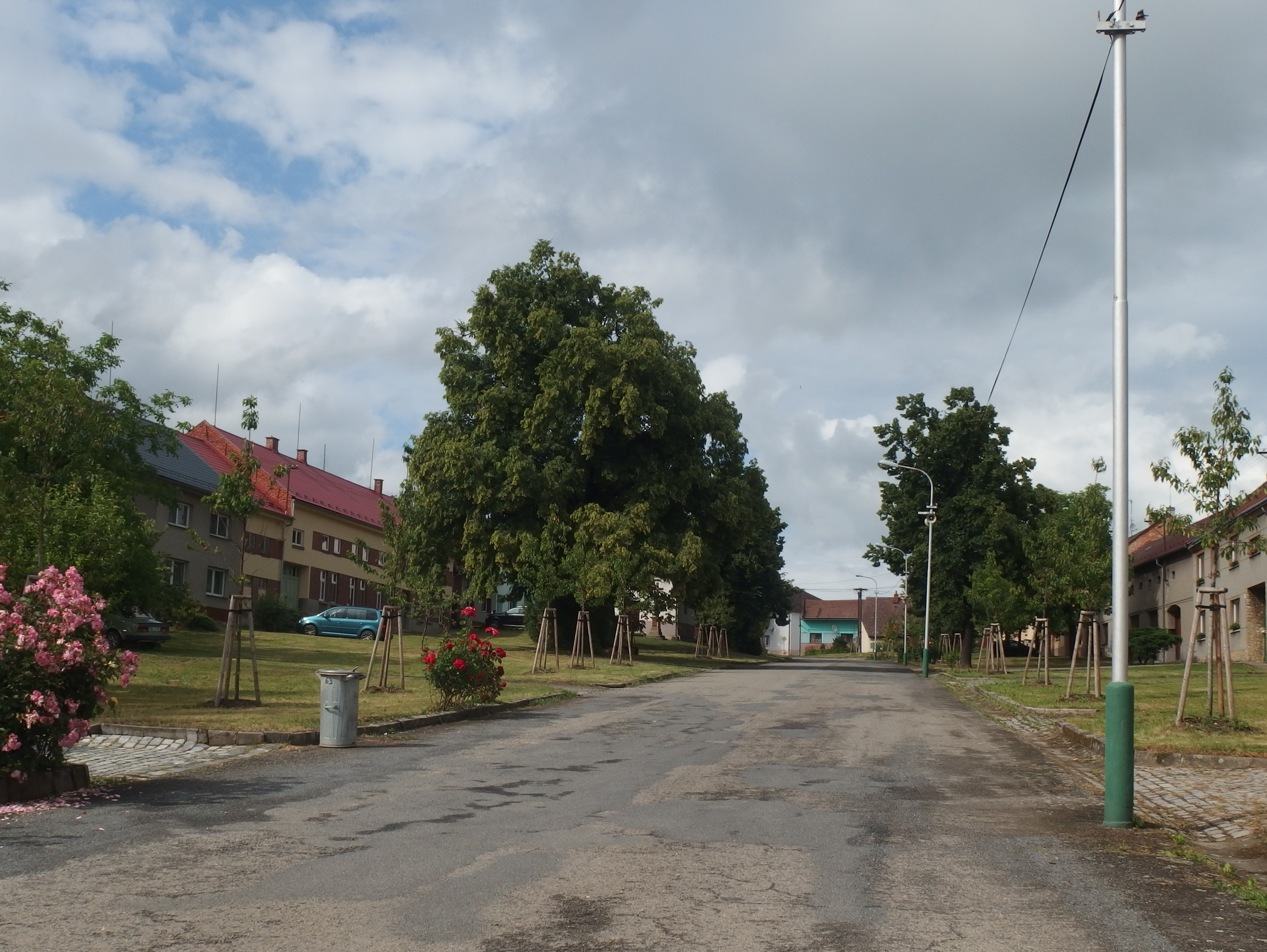
- Luková, a part of Brodek u Přerova

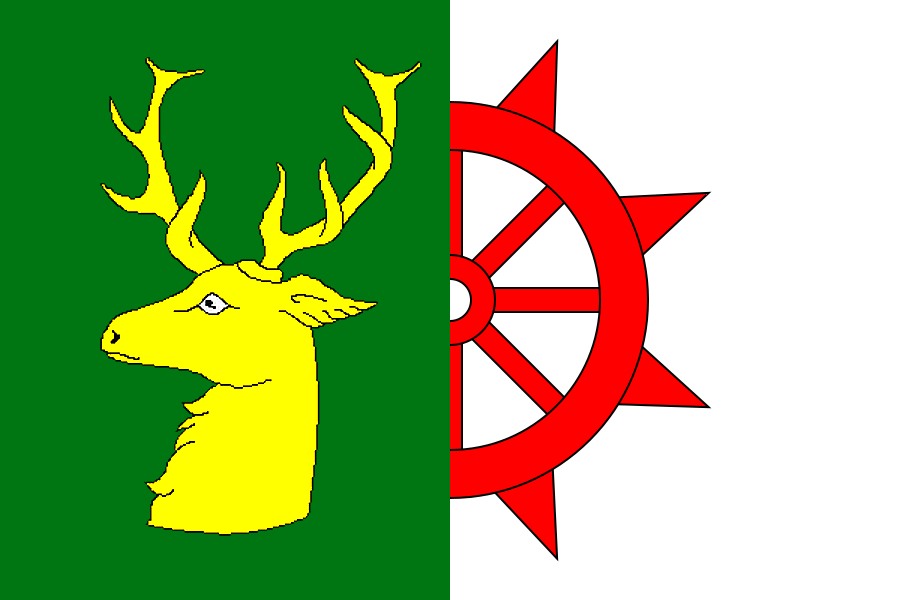
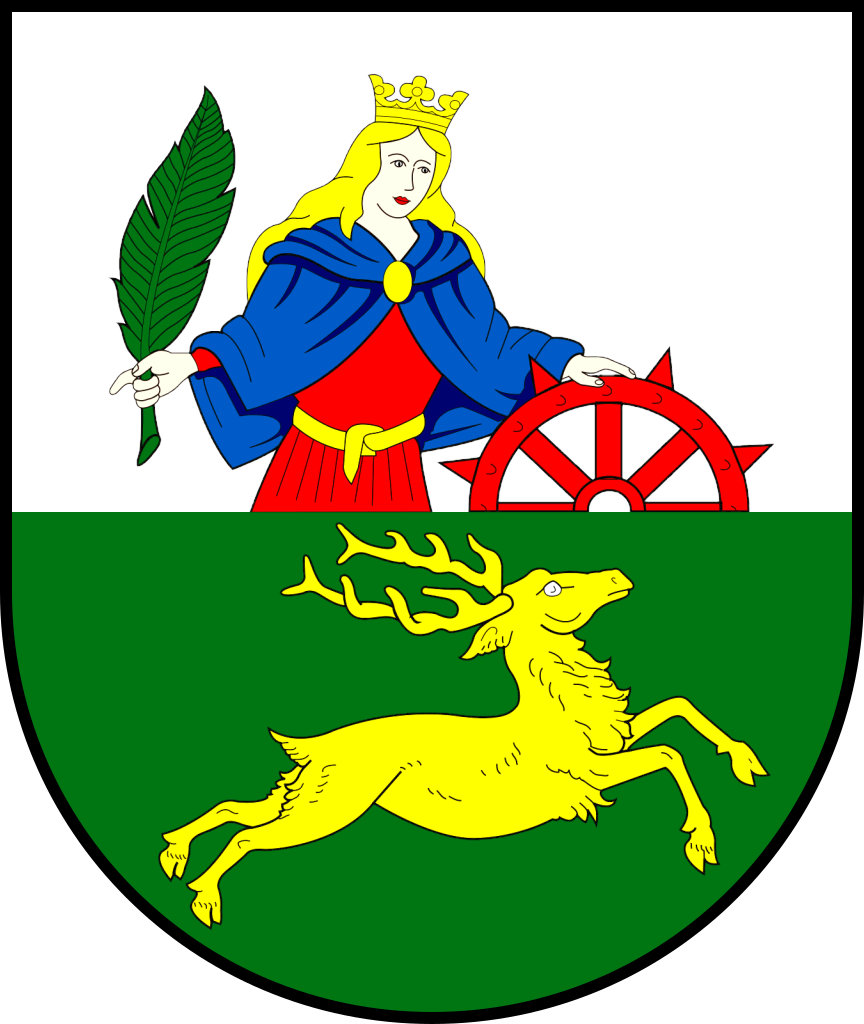
- Flag Coat of arms

- Location in the Czech Republic
- Coordinates: 49°29′3″N 17°20′18″E
- Country: Czech Republic
- Region: Olomouc
- District: Přerov
- First mentioned: 1301

Area
  - Total: 8.91 km^{2} (3.44 sq mi)
- Elevation: 205 m (673 ft)

Population (2026-01-01)
  - Total: 1,843
  - Density: 207/km^{2} (536/sq mi)
- Time zone: UTC+1 (CET)
  - Summer (DST): UTC+2 (CEST)
- Postal code: 751 03
- Website: www.brodekuprerova.cz

Brodek u Přerova (Czech pronunciation: [ˈbrodɛk ˈu pr̝̊ɛrova]; until 1949 Brodek) is a market town in Přerov District in the Olomouc Region of the Czech Republic. It has about 1,800 inhabitants.

== Administrative division ==
Brodek u Přerova consists of two municipal parts (in brackets population according to the 2021 census):

- Brodek u Přerova (1,626)
- Luková (186)

== Etymology ==
The name Brodek is a diminutive of the Czech word brod, meaning 'ford'.

== Geography ==
Brodek u Přerova is located about 8 kilometres (5 mi) northwest of Přerov and 12 km (7 mi) south of Olomouc. Most of the municipal territory lies in the Upper Morava Valley, but the village of Luková lies in the southern tip of the Nízký Jeseník range. The highest point is at 237 m (778 ft) above sea level. The Olešnice Stream flows north of the market town.

== History ==
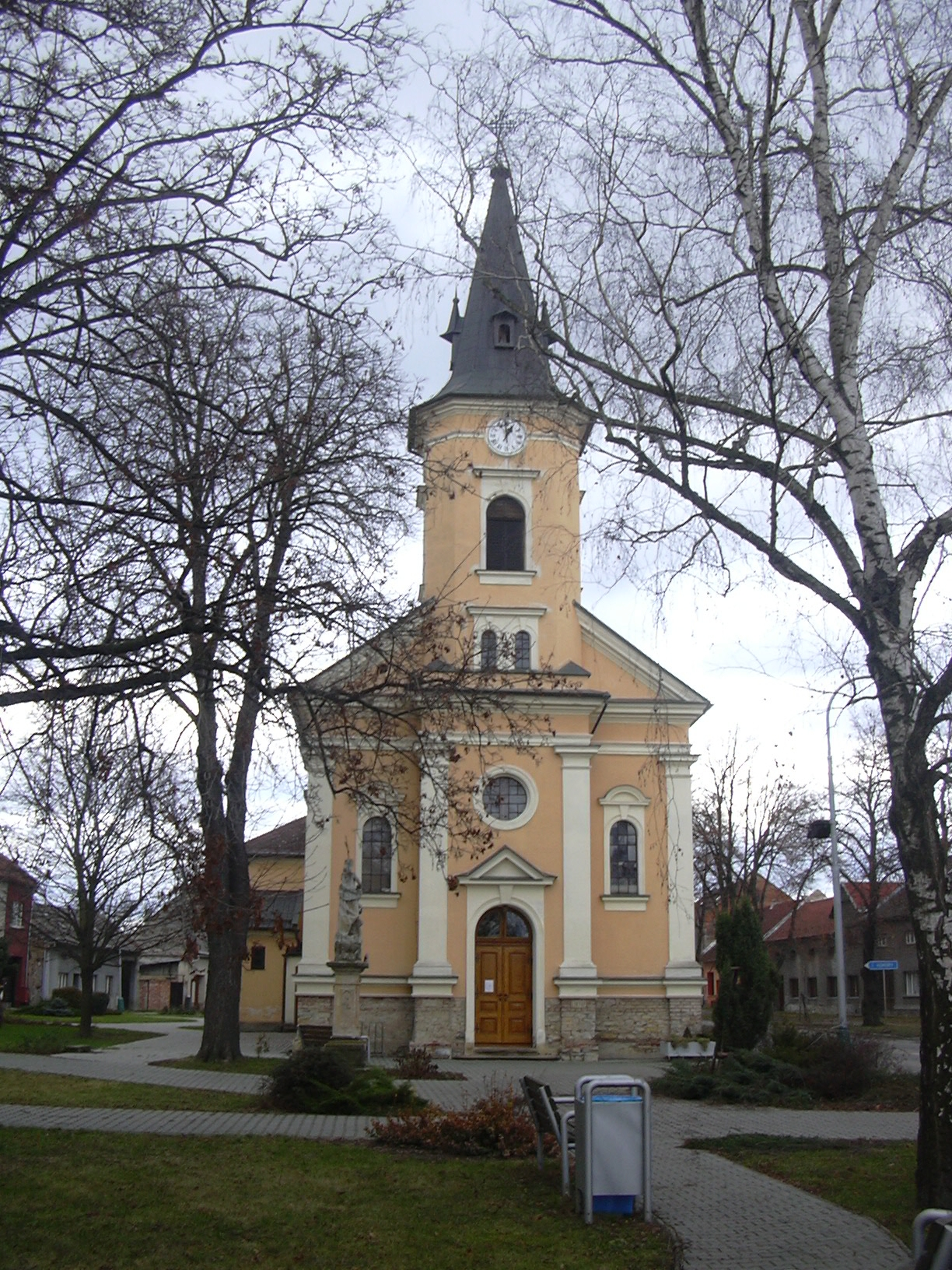
Church of the Nativity of Saint John the Baptist

The first written mention of Brodek is from 1301. Brodek was a property of the Dominican monastery in Olomouc until 1782.

Brodek u Přerova was promoted to a market town in 1909, which lasted until World War II. This title was restored in 2009.

== Demographics ==
Historical population

Year	Pop.	±%
1869	1,001	—
1880	1,066	+6.5%
1890	1,243	+16.6%
1900	1,497	+20.4%
1910	1,590	+6.2%

Year	Pop.	±%
1921	1,770	+11.3%
1930	2,170	+22.6%
1950	2,059	−5.1%
1961	2,181	+5.9%
1970	2,190	+0.4%

Year	Pop.	±%
1980	2,081	−5.0%
1991	1,954	−6.1%
2001	1,915	−2.0%
2011	2,019	+5.4%
2021	1,812	−10.3%

Source: Censuses

== Economy ==
The market town is known for bellfounding. Many church bells of the churches in the Czech Republic have been cast in local workshop of the Dytrych family, founded in 1951.

== Transport ==
Brodek u Přerova is located on the railway lines Šumperk–Vyškov and Uničov–Nezamyslice.

== Sights ==
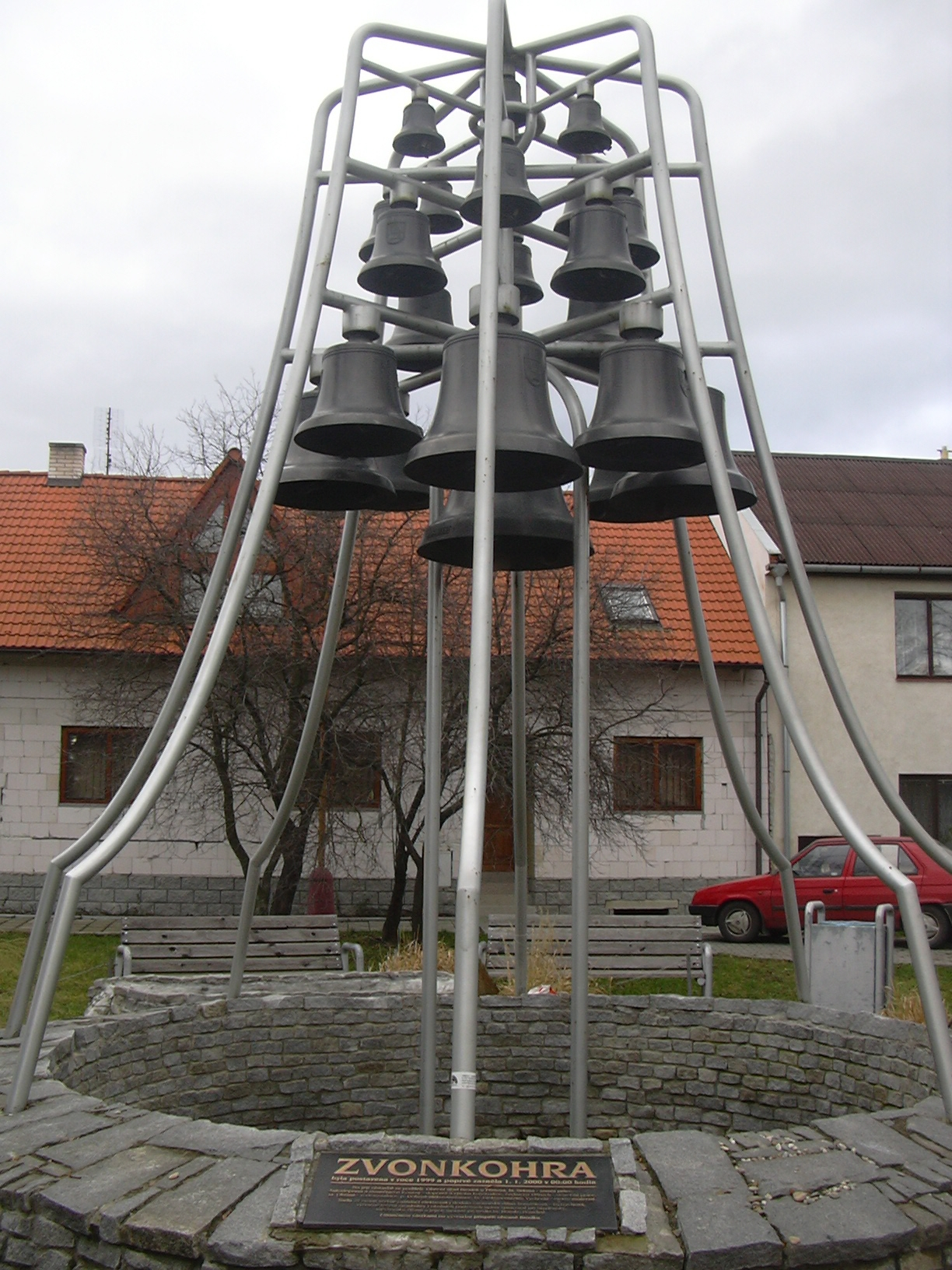
Brodek carillon

The main landmark is the Church of the Nativity of Saint John the Baptist. It was built in the pseudo-Romanesque style in 1893.

In 2000, the Brodek carillon was put into operation, manufactured in a local workshop. It contains 22 bells ranging from 5 to 220 kilograms (11 to 485 lb).

== Notable people ==
- Vlastimil Brlica (1928–2019), athlete
