= Levi Psavkin =

Israeli former Olympic runner (born 1939)

Personal information
- Native name: לוי פסבקין
- Citizenship: Israel
- Born: April 12, 1939 (age 87)
- Employers: the Israeli Athletic Association, Secretary
- Height: 5 ft 8 in (173 cm)
- Weight: 168 lb (76 kg)

Sport
- Country: Israel
- Sport: Athletics
- Events: 100m; 200m

Achievements and titles
- National finals: Israeli Champion in 100 metres (1964 and 1967), and in 200 metres (1964).
- Personal best: 100 metres: 10.6 (1963)

Levi Psavkin (also "Levy"; Hebrew: לוי פסבקין; born April 12, 1939) is an Israeli former Olympic runner. He was the Israeli Champion in the 100 metres (1964 and 1967), and in the 200 metres (1964).

He is Jewish, and his entire family was killed in the Holocaust.

== Running career ==
His personal best in the 100 metres was 10.6, in 1963.

He won the Israeli Championship in the 100 metres in both 1964 and 1967, and in the 200 metres in 1964.

He competed for Israel at the 1964 Summer Olympics in Tokyo, Japan, at the age of 25 in Athletics. In the Men's 100 metres he came in 7th in Heat 5, with a time of 11.1. He placed 64th out of 72 runners. When he competed in the Olympics, he was 5 feet 8 inches (173 cm) and weighed 168 pounds (76 kg).

== Running administration ==
He was Chief of the Israeli delegation at the 2002 European Track and Field Championships. He has been a member of the European Athletic Association's Development Committee, and the Veterans Committee of the International Association of Athletics Federation.

He is now the Secretary of the Israeli Athletic Association, in Tel Aviv, Israel.
