= Eric Cleaver =

British discus thrower (1927–2021)

Personal information
- Nationality: British (English)
- Born: 15 June 1927 Southampton, England
- Died: 15 March 2021 (aged 93) Salisbury, Wiltshire, England

Sport
- Sport: Athletics
- Event: discus throw
- Club: Army AC; London AC

Eric Alfred Ratfyn Cleaver (15 June 1927 – 15 March 2021) was an English discus thrower.

== Biography ==
Cleaver finished third behind Mark Pharaoh in the discus throw event at the 1956 AAA Championships.

Cleaver was selected for the England athletics team in the discus at the 1958 British Empire and Commonwealth Games in Cardiff, Wales.

Cleaver finished second and third respectively behind Mike Lindsay at the 1959 AAA Championships and 1960 AAA Championships.

Cleaver also competed in the 1962 European Athletics Championships and served in the Royal Army Physical Training Corps.

Cleaver died on 15 March 2021, at the age of 93.
