= Flavio Asta =

Italian shot putter and discus thrower (born 1946)

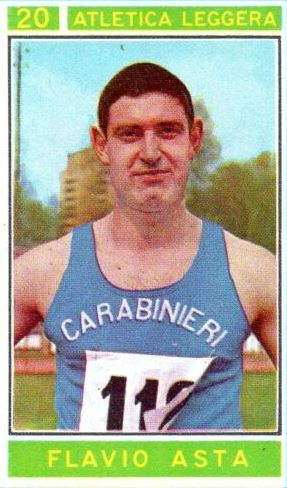

Personal information
- National team: Italy (21 caps from 1965 to 1974)
- Born: 10 September 1946 (age 79) Padua, Italy

Sport
- Sport: Athletics
- Events: Shot put Discus throw
- Club: C.S. Carabinieri

Achievements and titles
- Personal bests: Shot put: 18.99 m (1969); Discus throw: 56.19 m (1966)

Flavio Asta (born 10 September 1946) is a former Italian shot putter and discus thrower two-time national champion at senior level (in shot put), who competed at two editions of the European Athletics Championships (1966, 1969).

== National records ==
- Shot put: 18.99 m ( (Italy) Verona, 17 August 1969) - record holder from 13 July 1969 to 31 July 1973

== Achievements ==
Year	Competition	Venue	Rank	Event	Measure	Notes
1966	European Championships	(Hungary) Budapest	13th	Discus throw	53.60 m	NQ
1969	European Championships	(Greece) Athens	13th	Shot put	18.34 m	NQ

== National titles ==
Asta won two national championships.

- Italian Athletics Championships
  - Shot put: 1969, 1974

== Personal bests ==
- Shot put: 18.99 m ( (Italy) Verona, 17 August 1969)
- Discus throw: 56.19 m ( (Socialist Federal Republic of Yugoslavia) Celje, 15 August 1966)
