= Roy Hollingsworth =

Trinidadian athlete

Personal information
- Born: 28 December 1933 Trinidad
- Died: 17 September 2014 (aged 80)
- Height: 6 ft 3 in (1.91 m)
- Weight: 98 kg (216 lb)

Sport
- Sport: Athletics
- Event: discus
- Club: Highgate Harriers
Medal record
Representing Trinidad and Tobago
Men's Athletics
Central American and Caribbean Games
Gold medal – first place	1966 Puerto Rico	discus

Roy Anselm Hollingsworth (28 December 1933 – 17 September 2014) was an international athlete from Trinidad and Tabago.

== Biography ==
Born in Trinidad, Hollingsworth was affiliated to Highgate Harriers and his personal best was 56.71m, set in 1963.

Hollingsworth finished second behind Mike Lindsay in the discus throw event at the 1960 AAA Championships. He represented England in the 1962 British Empire and Commonwealth Games before representing Great Britain at the 1964 Summer Olympics in the discus and came tenth in that competition.

Hollingsworth became the British discus throw champion after winning the British AAA Championships title at the 1964 AAA Championships Representing Trinidad, he came fifth in the 1966 Commonwealth Games.

In 1969, Hollingsworth married Afro-Puerto Rican Georgina Falú Pesante and they had one son, Rey Hollingsworth Falú. Roy A. Hollingsworth died on September 17, 2014.

== International competitions ==
Year	Competition	Venue	Position	Event	Notes
Representing Great Britain and England
1962	British Empire and Commonwealth Games	Perth, Australia	14th	Shot put	13.30 m
1962	British Empire and Commonwealth Games	Perth, Australia	7th	Discus throw	48.07 m
1964	Olympic Games	Tokyo, Japan	10th	Discus throw	53.87 m
Representing Trinidad and Tobago
1966	Central American and Caribbean Games	San Juan, Puerto Rico	2nd	Shot put	15.36 m
1966	Central American and Caribbean Games	San Juan, Puerto Rico	1st	Discus throw	52.10 m
1966	Central American and Caribbean Games	San Juan, Puerto Rico	11th	Hammer throw	34.95 m
1966	British Empire and Commonwealth Games	Kingston, Jamaica	7th	Shot put	15.23 m
1966	British Empire and Commonwealth Games	Kingston, Jamaica	5th	Discus throw	53.93 m
