= Gideon Ariel =

Israeli authority in biomechanics

- Gideon Ariel (1960)

Personal information
- Native name: גדעון אריאל
- National team: Israel
- Born: April 27, 1939 (age 87) Tel Aviv, Mandatory Palestine
- Education: Wingate Institute; University of Wyoming; University of Massachusetts Amherst
- Height: 6 ft 0 in (183 cm)
- Weight: 220 lb (100 kg)

Sport
- Country: Israel
- Sport: Discus and Shot Put

Achievements and titles
- Personal bests: discus throw: 55.22 meters (1964); shot put: 16.27 meters (1966)
- Updated on 28 August 2016

Gideon Ariel (Hebrew: גדעון אריאל; also "Uriel," born April 27, 1939) is an Israeli authority in biomechanics, as well as a former Olympic track and field athlete who competed in the discus throw.

== Early and personal life ==
Ariel was born in Tel Aviv, Israel. His father, the son of a rabbi, was born in Poland in 1904, and made aliyah (moved to Israel, then known as Palestine) in 1922, and ultimately became a hotel manager and then head of customs at the Jaffa port, as well as a member of the Stern Gang. His mother worked as the secretary to the Mayor of Tel Aviv. His parents divorced when he was ten years old. At the age of 11, he moved to a kibbutz. He served three years in the Israel Defense Forces.

He studied at the Wingate Institute in Israel, and later attended the University of Wyoming on an athletic scholarship, beginning in 1963 and graduating in 1966. Ariel obtained a master's degree from the University of Massachusetts Amherst in Exercise Science. He completed his graduate and post-doctoral work at the University of Massachusetts Amherst, where he received a Ph.D. in Exercise and Computer Science.

Ariel and his former wife Yael Tzabar had a child, Geffen Olympia. He lived in Amherst, Massachusetts and Coto de Caza, California. He has three more daughters: Tova, Nomi, and Ilana Ariel.

== Discus and shot put ==
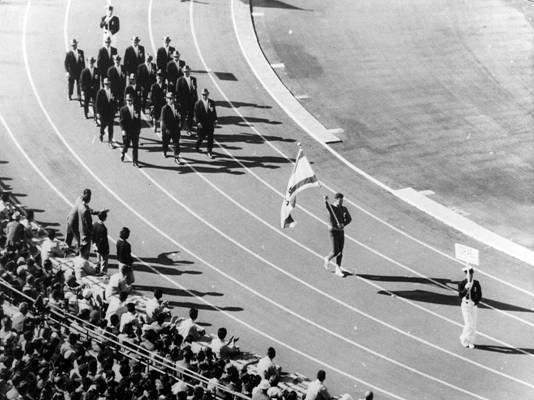
Gideon Ariel bearing the Israeli flag

When Ariel competed in the Olympics, he was 6 ft (180 cm) tall, and weighed 220 pounds (100 kg).

Ariel competed for Israel at the 1960 Summer Olympics in Rome, at the age of 21, in the Men's Shot Put, and came in 22nd with a distance of 14.65 meters. He was also the flag bearer for Israel at the 1960 Olympics.

Ariel competed for Israel at the 1964 Summer Olympics in Tokyo, at the age of 25, in the Men's Discus Throw, and came in 26th with a distance of 46.12 meters. He was again the flag bearer for Israel at the 1964 Olympics.

His personal best in the discus throw was 55.22 meters, in 1964. Ariel's personal best in the shot put was 16.27 meters, in 1966.

== Scientific career ==
=== Anabolic steroids ===
Ariel performed research in the use of anabolic steroids, technically known as anabolic-androgen steroids (AAS) or colloquially as "steroids" (or even "roids"), which are drugs that mimic the effects of testosterone and dihydrotestosterone in the body. Uses of anabolic steroids in sports are controversial because of their adverse effects and the potential to gain an advantage conventionally considered "cheating."

=== Biomechanical performance optimization ===
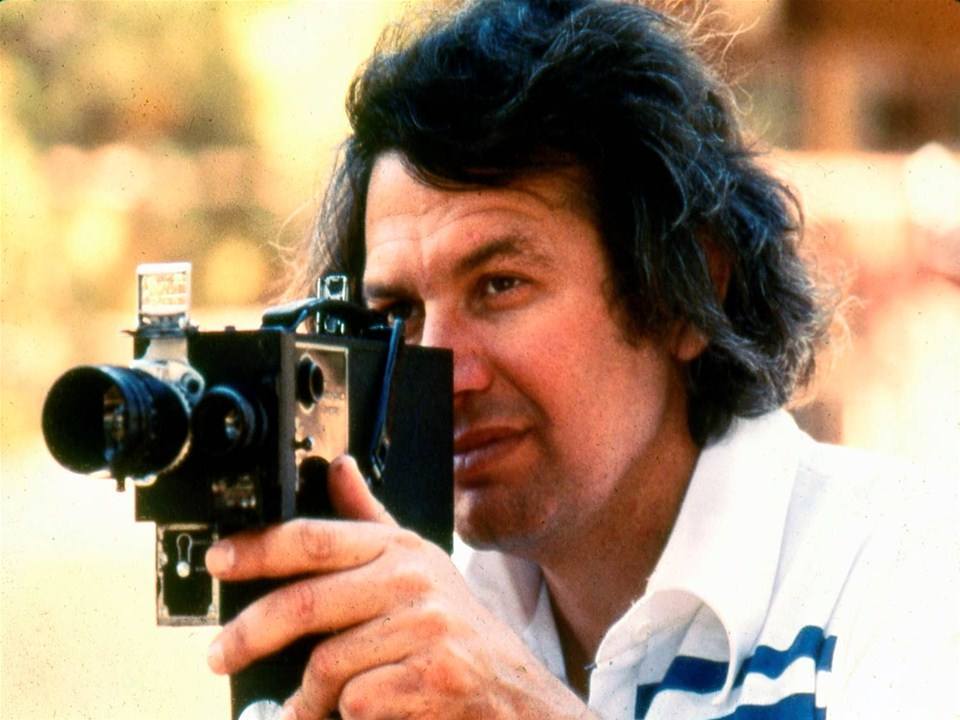
Gideon Ariel at the Mexico Olympics 1968

Ariel developed a business of biomechanical services, ranging from physical rehabilitation to personalized athletic instruction, working with athletes including Olympic champion discus thrower Al Oerter—who after working with Ariel, at age 43 threw a discus 27 feet farther than his best gold medal performance.

Another of those athletes was Mac Wilkins. In 1975, the USOC had gathered 12 of America's best discus throwers to be filmed in action with high speed cameras. The footage was sent to Ariel's laboratory where he conducted his analysis on their performances. Wilkins commented on Ariel's assessment of his technique: "He pointed out that my front leg was absorbing energy that could go into the throw. I had to begin to change my whole conception of throwing I used to think I had to put as much of my speed in the direction of the throw." Ariel's analysis had shown that Mac was generating speeds up to 30 percent faster in one segment of the throw than anyone else, but it was dissipating it at the end. According to Ariel, the computer "found that with a perfectly timed summation of his forces, Wilkins could throw the discus 250 feet." After implementing Gideon's advice, Mac Wilkins went on to break the world record and win the Olympic gold medal at the 1976 games in Montreal, Canada.

He founded the Olympic Training Center in Squaw Valley and Colorado Springs and became chairman of the U.S. Olympic Biomechanical Committee. In San Diego, he founded Ariel Dynamics to apply biomechanical concepts to sports performance.

== Patents and inventions ==
=== Variable resistance exercising device ===
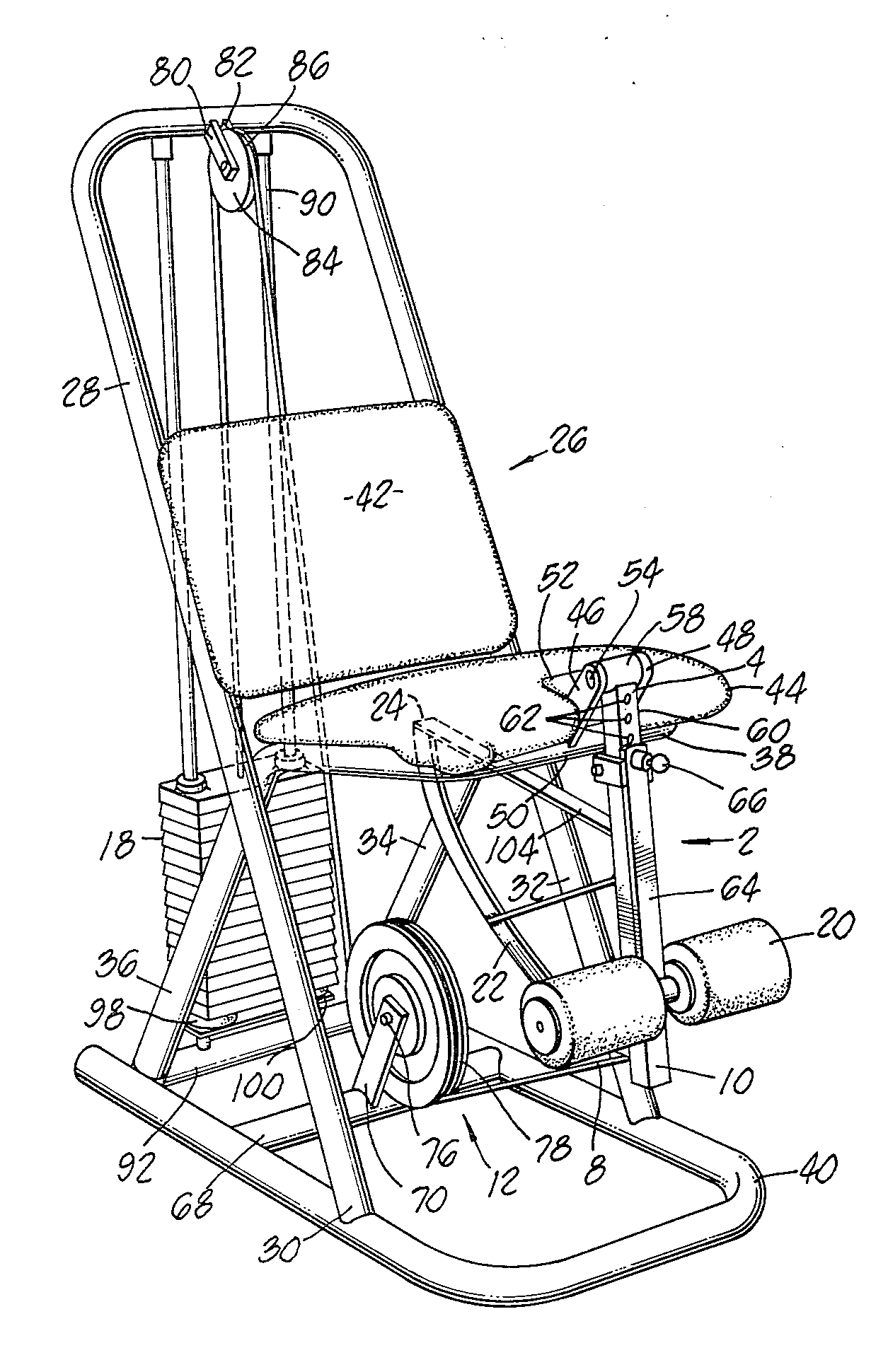
Variable resistance exercising device, 1976

An improved exercising device for exercising the legs of a user includes a frame member with a lever arm having one end pivotably attached thereto. The lever arm extends downwardly from the portion of the frame member to which it is pivotably connected, and a pair of foot-engaging force transferring members are mounted on the lower end of the lever arm. A cable has one end pivotably connected near the lower end of the lever arm, passes around an eccentrically mounted pulley and has its other end connected to weights. As the user lifts the lower portions of his legs, the lever arm is pivoted to pull the cable and the weights attached thereto, thereby strengthening the knee muscles of the user. The eccentrically mounted pulley varies the resistance to movement of the user's lower legs initially increasing the resistance and then decreasing the resistance in a sinusoidal manner as the lower legs are lifted to pivot the lever arm and lift the weights. Patent US 4256302 A, 1981.

=== Exerciser ===
An exerciser bar is supported for rotation and acts against a hydraulic cylinder with the angle of the bar and the pressure in the cylinder measured and fed to a micro computer which, using this input data, controls the cylinder pressure in accordance with a selected exercise program, the micro computer also providing outputs to displays so that the person exercising can monitor his progress. Patent US 4354676 A, 1982.

=== Passive programmable resistance device ===
Passive programmable resistance device, 1985

A passive programmable resistance device uses a closed loop feedback for controlling resistance to rotational or translational motion of an object. One or more actual parameters, such as force or position, are measured and compared with desired parameters. The differences are used to provide a control signal which controls the resistance to the movement of the object. Patent US 4544154 A, 1985.

=== Related patents ===
- Exerciser. France - No. 80-23965. 1979.
- Exerciser. Japan - No. 1,151,489. 1983.
- Exerciser. United Kingdom - No. 2,086,738. 1984.
- Exercise Apparatus. United Kingdom - No. 2,193,901. 1986.
- Hydraulic Valve Assembly for Controlling An Hydraulic Cylinder. No. 6-898,013. 1986.
- Exercise Apparatus. Germany - No. P3715406. 1987.
- Exercise Apparatus. Japan - No. 62-081362. 1987.
- Hydraulic Valve Assembly for Controlling An Hydraulic Cylinder. Germany -No. P3709900,0. 1987.
- Hydraulic Valve Assembly for Controlling An Hydraulic Cylinder. Japan -No. 62-164126. 1987.
- Hydraulic Valve Assembly for Controlling An Hydraulic Cylinder. United Kingdom - No. 2,194,309. 1990.
- Exercise Apparatus. Canada - No. 1,279,669. 1991.
- Exercise Bar Acting Against Hydraulic Cylinder. W. Germany - No. 3042520. 1991.
- Exercise Bar Acting Against Hydraulic Cylinder. Canada - No. 1,143,760. 1992.
- Dynamic Knee Brace. 1994.
- Variable Sole Design for Athletic Shoe. 1994.
- Exerciser. Canada - No. 1,143,760. 1994.

== Scientific publications ==
Publications related to anabolic steroids

- Anabolic steroid: the physiological effects of placebos. Track Technique, 46: 1470–1472, 1971.
- Athletes taking placebo for steroids improve. Track and Field News, 1971.
- Effect of anabolic steroids on reflex components. Journal of Applied Physiol, 32: 795–797, 1972.
- Anabolic steroids: The physiological effects of placebos. Medicine and Science, 4: 124–126, 1972.
- Anabolic steroids and muscle contractile force. Track Technique, 48: 1534–1536, 1972.
- The effects of anabolic steroid (Methandrostenolene) upon physiological parameters. Athletic Training, 7: 190–200, 1972.
- Residual effect of an anabolic steroid upon isotonic muscular force. Journal of Sports Medicine and Physical Fitness, 1972.
- Anabolic steroids - a summary of related literature. Track and Field Quarterly Review, 73: 48–58, 1973.
- Anabole steroide: die physiologischen wirkungen von placebos. Leis ungssport, 1.73: 52–55, 1973.
- Anabole steroid und die muskelkontraktionskraft. Leistungssport, 1.73: 55–57, 1973.
- The effect of anabolic steroid upon skeletal muscle force. J Sports Medicine and Physical Fitness, 13: 187–190, 1973.
- The effect of anabolic steroids on muscular force. Track & Field Quarterly Review, 73: 184–191, 1973.
- Prolonged effects of anabolic steroid upon muscular contractile force. Medicine and Science in Sports, 6: 62–64, 1974.
- Physiologische wirkungen von anabolen steroiden. pp. 154–155. Verlag Bartels & Wernitz KG. 1974.

Publications related to athletic shoe design

- The biomechanics of athletic shoe design. Medicine and Science in Sports. 7: 78 1975.
- Computerized biomechanical analysis of athletic shoe. V International Congress of Biomechanics Abstracts, P 5, Jyvaskyla, Finland, 1975.
- Athletic shoe design. Modern Athlete and Coach, 15: 7–9, 1977.

Publications related to athletics

- Computerized biomechanical analysis of the world pole vault. Proceedings to the Scientific Congress, Munich Olympic Games, 1972.
- Computer analysis of track biomechanics. Track Technique, 50: 1597–1598, 1972.
- Computerized biomechanical analysis of track and field athletes utilized by the Olympic Training Camp for throwing events. Track and Field Quarterly Review, 72: 99–103, 1972.
- Computerized biomechanical analysis of the world pole vault. Track and Field Quarterly Review, 72: 217–222, 1972.
- Biomechanical analysis of the shot-put utilizing the center of gravity displacement. Track and Field Quarterly Review, 73: 207–210, 1973.
- Analusis biomecanico de los mejores lanzadores do peso mundiales procesado mediante ordenador (2. parte). 1973 Madrid Congresos VI - I T F C A, 1973.
- Computerized biomechanical analysis of the world's best shot-putters. Track and Field Quarterly Review, 73: 199–206, 1973.
- Die biomechanische bewegungsanalyse mit hilfe des computers. Leistungssport, 4: 301–308, 1973.
- Computerized biomechanical analysis of human performance. Mechanics and Sport. pp. 267–275. The American Society of Mechanical Engineers. 1973.
- Computer application biomechanical analysis of human performance in sport and industry. Canadian Congress of Sport and Physical Activity, Abstracts, October: 1973.
- Biomekaaninen liikeanalyysi tietokoneella. Yleis-Urheilu, 9: 4–9, 1973.
- Computerized biomechanical analysis of the knee joint during deep knee bend with heavy load. Fourth International Seminar on Biomechanics Volume IV. 1973.
- Javelin throw: computer biomechanical analysis. Track Technique, 54: 1726–1928, 1973.
- Analysis biomecanico de los mejores lanzadores do peso mundiales procesado mediante ordenador (1. parte). 1973 Madrid Congresos VI - I T F C A, 1973.
- Biomechanische analysen sprtlicher bewegungsablaufe mit hilfe von computen. Olympische Analysen. pp. 147–149. Verlag Bartels & Wernitz KG. 1974.
- Understanding the scientific basis behind our Universal Centurion. 1974.
- Computerized biomechanical analysis of human performance. XXth World Congress in Sports Medicine Handbook, Melbourne, Australia, 1974.
- Computerized biomechanical analysis of human performance. Athletic Journal, 54: 54–84, 1974.
- Method for biomechanical analysis of human performance. Research Quarterly, 45: 72–79, 1974.
- Computerized biomechanical analysis of the world pole vault record. Sport in the Modern World. pp. 310–312. Springer - Verlag. 1974.
- Principios del movimiento balistico en los ejercicios contra resistencia. Stadium, 52: 8–10, 1975.
- Computerized biomechanical analysis of human performance. Biomechanics of Sport. pp. 228–229. 1975.
- Computerized biomechanical analysis of human performance. XXth World Congress in Sports Medicine, Congress Proceedings, 71–79, 1975.
- Principles of ballistic motion in resistance exercise training. Track and Field Quarterly Review, 75: 58–61, 1975.
- Computerized biomechanical analysis of throwers at the 1975 Olympic Javelin Camp. Track and Field Quarterly Review, 76: 45–50, 1976.
- The ultimate in high jump performance. Track and Field Quarterly Review, 77: 59–61, 1977.
- Biomechanical analysis of ballistic vs. tracking movements in tennis skills. Proceedings of a National Symposium on The Racquet Sports, the University of Illinois at Urbana-Champaign, 105–123, 1979.
- Computer use for biomechanical analysis, data acquisition, and human-machine interface. Proceedings of the Thirteenth Hawaii International Conference on System Science, Volume III: 470–475, 1980.
- Biomechanical analysis of shot putting. Track and Field Quarterly Review, 79: 27–37, 1980.
- Biomechanical analysis of javelin throw. Track and Field Quarterly Review, 80: 9–17, 1980.
- Biomechanical analysis of hammer throw. Track and Field Quarterly Review, 80: 41–51, 1980.
- Biomechanical aspects of Olympic sports medicine. Clinics in Sports Medicine. pp. 31–36. W.B. Sauders Company. 1983.
- Biofeedback and biomechanics in athletic training. Biofeedback and Sports Science. pp. 107–145. Plenum Publishing Corp. 1985.
- Body mechanics. In: Injuries to the Throwing Arm from the Proceedings of the National Conference Sponsored by the U S O C Sports Medicine Council, Philadelphia, 3-21, 1985.
- Body aerodynamics: contribution to long jump performance. Track & Field Quarterly Review, 92: 11–13, 1992.
- Two world's best long jumps: comparative biomechanical analysis. Track & Field Quarterly Review, 92: 6–10, 1992.

Publications related to exercise equipment

- Computer application biomechanical analysis of human performance in sport and industry. Canadian Congress of Sport and Physical Activity, Abstracts, October: 1973.
- Computerized biomechanical analysis of the knee joint during deep knee bend with heavy load. Fourth International Seminar on Biomechanics Volume IV. 1973.
- Biomechanical consideration in the design and construction of resistance exercise equipment. Proceedings of the 1st Annual Meeting, the Canadian Society for Biomechanics University of Alberta, Edmonton, Alberta, 25–34, 1974.
- Shear and compression forces in the knee joint during deep knee bend. XXth World Congress in Sports Medicine Handbook, Melbourne, Australia, 1974.
- Understanding the scientific basis behind our Universal Centurion. 1974.
- Computerized biomechanical analysis of human performance: an application for exercise equipment design and athletic performance. Universal Fitness Research Department, Technical Report Uni-1, 1974.
- Computerized biomechanical analysis of the bench press and the leg press exercises. Universal Fitness Research Department, Technical Report Uni-2, 1974.
- Variable resistance exercise: a biomechanical approach to muscular training. Universal Fitness Research Department, Technical Report Uni-3, 1974.
- Intra-articular shearing factor during resistance exercises. Universal Fitness Research Department, Technical Report Uni-4, 1974.
- Principles of ballistic motion in resistance exercise training. Universal Fitness Research Department, Technical Report Uni-5, 1974.
- Resistance exercise and muscle fiber typing. Universal Fitness Research Department, Technical Report Uni-3, 1974.
- Physical education: 2001?. Quest, XX!: 1974.
- Computerized biomechanical analysis of the variable resistance exercise machine. Universal Fitness Research Department, Technical Report Uni-7, 1974.
- Assessment of muscular performance. Universal Fitness Research Department, Technical Report Uni-8, 1974.
- Computerized biomechanical analysis of human performance. Athletic Journal, 54: 54–84, 1974.
- Method for biomechanical analysis of human performance. Research Quarterly, 45: 72–79, 1974.
- Principles of ballistic motion in resistive exercise training. Scholastic Coach, 43: 80–108, 1974.
- Understanding the scientific bases behind variable resistance exercises. Fresno: Universal Athletic Sales, 1974.
- Intra-articular forces and stresses in the knee joint during the deep-knee bend. Medicine and Science in Sports. 6: 73 1974.
- Comparative conditioning analysis. Fresno: Universal Athletic Corp, 1974.
- Biomechanical analysis of the knee joint during deep knee bend with heavy load. XXth World Congress in Sports Medicine, Congress Proceedings, 53–60, 1975.
- Principles of ballistic motion in resistance exercise training. Track and Field Quarterly Review, 75: 58–61, 1975.
- Neural control of locomotion - a kinetic analysis of the trot in cats. Neural Control of Locomotion. pp. 759–762. Plenum Publishing Corp. 1976.
- Computerized dynamic resistive exercise. Abstracts of The International Congress of Physical Activity Sciences, Quebec City, Canada, 1976.
- Computerized dynamic resistive exercise. Biomechanics of Sports and Kinanthropometry. The International Congress of Physical Activity Sciences, 1977.
- Equipment Safety and Effectiveness. Therapeutics Through Exercise. pp. 197–201. Grune & Stratton, Inc. 1979.
- Biomechanical analysis of ballistic vs. tracking movements in tennis skills. Proceedings of a National Symposium on The Racquet Sports, the University of Illinois at Urbana-Champaign, 105–123, 1979.
- Computer use for biomechanical analysis, data acquisition, and human-machine interface. Proceedings of the Thirteenth Hawaii International Conference on System Science, Volume III: 470–475, 1980.
- Human movement analysis. Applied Ergonomics, 11: 61–62, 1980.
- Resistive Training. Clinics in Sports Med, 2: 55–69, 1983.
- Biomechanical aspects of Olympic sports medicine. Clinics in Sports Medicine. pp. 31–36. W.B. Sauders Company. 1983.
- Resistive training. Clinics in Sports Medicine. pp. 55–70. W.B. Saunders Company. 1983.
- Biofeedback and biomechanics in athletic training. Biofeedback and Sports Science. pp. 107–145. Plenum Publishing Corp. 1985.
- Body mechanics. In: Injuries to the Throwing Arm from the Proceedings of the National Conference Sponsored by the U S O C Sports Medicine Council, Philadelphia, 3-21, 1985.
- Mechanics of Exercise Fitness. Encyclopedia of Medical Devices and Instrumentation. pp. 387–392. John Wiley & Sons. 1988.
- Biomechanics. Scientific Foundations of Sports Medicine. pp. 271–297. B.C. Decker, Inc. 1989.
- The Ariel Performance Analysis System. SPIE, 1356: 76–78, 1990.
- A study to determine the aerobic adaptation to work and fatigue training modes on the Ariel CES Multifunction Station. 1991.
- Biomechanics of Exercise Fitness. Encyclopedia of Medical Devices and Instrumentation; Volume 1; John G. Webster; John Wiley & Sons, Inc. pp. 384–403, 2006.

== Popular media ==
=== Books ===
Gideon Ariel has authored two books detailing the events of his life and career. The book titled "The Oasis of Dreams, the Legend of Hadassim" reflects on events that transpired in Hadassim, Israel, a kibbutz that incorporated a unique educational system for children.

In his autobiography titled "The Discus Thrower and His Dream Factory", Ariel describes how one single throw of a discus in a competitive event saved him from a life as a juvenile delinquent and set him on the path to become a biomechanist.

=== Selected publications ===
- Esquire's Olympics Preview: How to know A perfect performance when you see one. Esquire, 66, 1976. Astor, G.
- Can the computer create superstars?. New England Sports Guide, July, 1976. Cole, M.
- Dr. Ariel's revolutionary computerized biomechanics. Track & Field News, December, 1977. Hersh, B.
- Want a better athlete? Now scientists can build you one. Us, May, 1977. Moore, G.
- Gideon and his magic machine. Sports Illustrated, August, 1977. Moore, K.
- In search of the optimal sprint. The New Englander, May, 1977. Rutstein, N.
- The perfect swing. Golf, October, 1978. Barkow, A.
- Computer helps design shoe that walks on air. Daily Hampshire Gazette, August, 1978. Cole, M.
- Computerized footwear. Canadian Footwear Journal, August, 1978. Lloyd, S.
- Can computers teach tennis. World Tennis, March, 1979. Amdur, N.
- Anything you can do, computer whiz Gideon Ariel can help you do better. People, September, 1979. Kessler, J.
- Can computers win gold medals?. New Scientist, July, 1980.
- The high priest of biomechanics. USAir Magazine, October, 1980. Barkow, A.
- Biomechanics in the service of athletes. Olympic Review, May, 1980. Coffrant, F.
- Future shoe. The Runner, March, 1980. Conniff, J.
- My coach, the computer. Miami Herald, Sports Extra, March, 1980. Gustkey, E.
- Winners. OMNI, July, 1980. Mazur, S.
- Sports scientists train athletes to defy old limits. Smithsonian, July, 1980. Stuller, J.
- California dreaming'. The Olympian, May, 1981. Brassey, L.
- No winning through witchcraft here. Express, July, 1981. King, P.
- A laboratory for jocks. Discover, February, 1981. Schechter, B.
- MODE: Sports. Sky-Delta Air Lines Magazine, July, 1982.
- Leap ahead with biomechanics. Science Now, 1, 1982.
- Anatomy of a motion. Passages, 1982. Bernstein, P.
- Sports - Coto Research Center: athletics goes digital. PSA Magazine, May, 1982. Bisheff, S.
- The human machine. Science Digest, June, 1982. Kluger, J.
- Gideon Ariel reigns over biomechanics Xanadu. Sportstyle, January, 1982. Leivenberg, R.
- Coached by computer. 321 Contact, October, 1982. Lyons, M.
- No fault tennis calls. Discover, December, 1982. McKean, K.
- Biomechanics - how computers extend athletic performance to the body's far limits. Popular Science, January, 1982. Ruby, D.
- Electronics in action. American Way, November, 1982. Stewart, D.
- Computer picture show. National Geographic World, December, 1983.
- Computer - the games robots play are revolutionizing tactics and training. Sports Mirror, August, 1983.
- The man behind the computer of the U.S. Olympic Sports Medicine Committee - person to person. Scholastic Coach, January, 1983.
- Coaching Olympians by computer. Body in Motion, October/November, 1983. Walker, P.
- The future of exercise equipment. National Trade Fitness Journal, Winter, 1983. Yessis, M.
- Computer-built champions. Sports & Leisure, November/December, 1984.
- Go for the gold. A+ Magazine, August, 1984. Barry, D.
- The world according to Gideon. Sportswise, September/October, 1984. Condor, B.
- Muscles by micro. Coaching Review, January, 1984. Gates, R.
- The sporting life - dynamic duo Vic Braden and Gideon Ariel. Gentry, February, 1984. Handy, H.
- Getting as fit as an Olympian. Family Computing, August, 1984. Pantiel, M. and Peterson, B.
- Olympic coaching by computer. In Cider, April, 1984. Sheldon, K.
- Enter the computerized competitor. World of Sports, July, 1984. Slon, S.
- Touch of gold. Enter, July/August, 1984. Wilson, K.
- The high-tech swing. Polo, May, 1985.
- The Huffy Project: using computers to build faster BMX'ers. BMX Action, June, 1985.
- Body building goes high-tech. IEEE Spectrum, May, 1985. Fischett, M.
- The acrobatics of human motion. Orange Coast, August, 1985. Jacobs, C.
- Ultra sports. OMNI, August, 1985. Teich, M., and Weintraub P.
- The athlete of the future. Los Angeles Times Magazine, March 19, 1989. Loverock, P.

=== Television ===
- High Tech and Sport on Good Morning America with David Hartmen.
- Long Jump Analysis and Comparison Between Carl Lewis and Bob Beamon on 20/20 with Dick Schapp.
- Black Athlete: Fact and Fiction and NBC Special with Tom Brokaw.
- Future Sport a 13-week program originally aired on ESPN.
- Future Watch on CNN, January, 1994.

== Awards and honors ==
In 2012, Gideon Ariel was awarded the Geoffrey Dyson Award at the ISBS 2012 Conference.
