= Dave Weill =

American former athlete (born 1941)

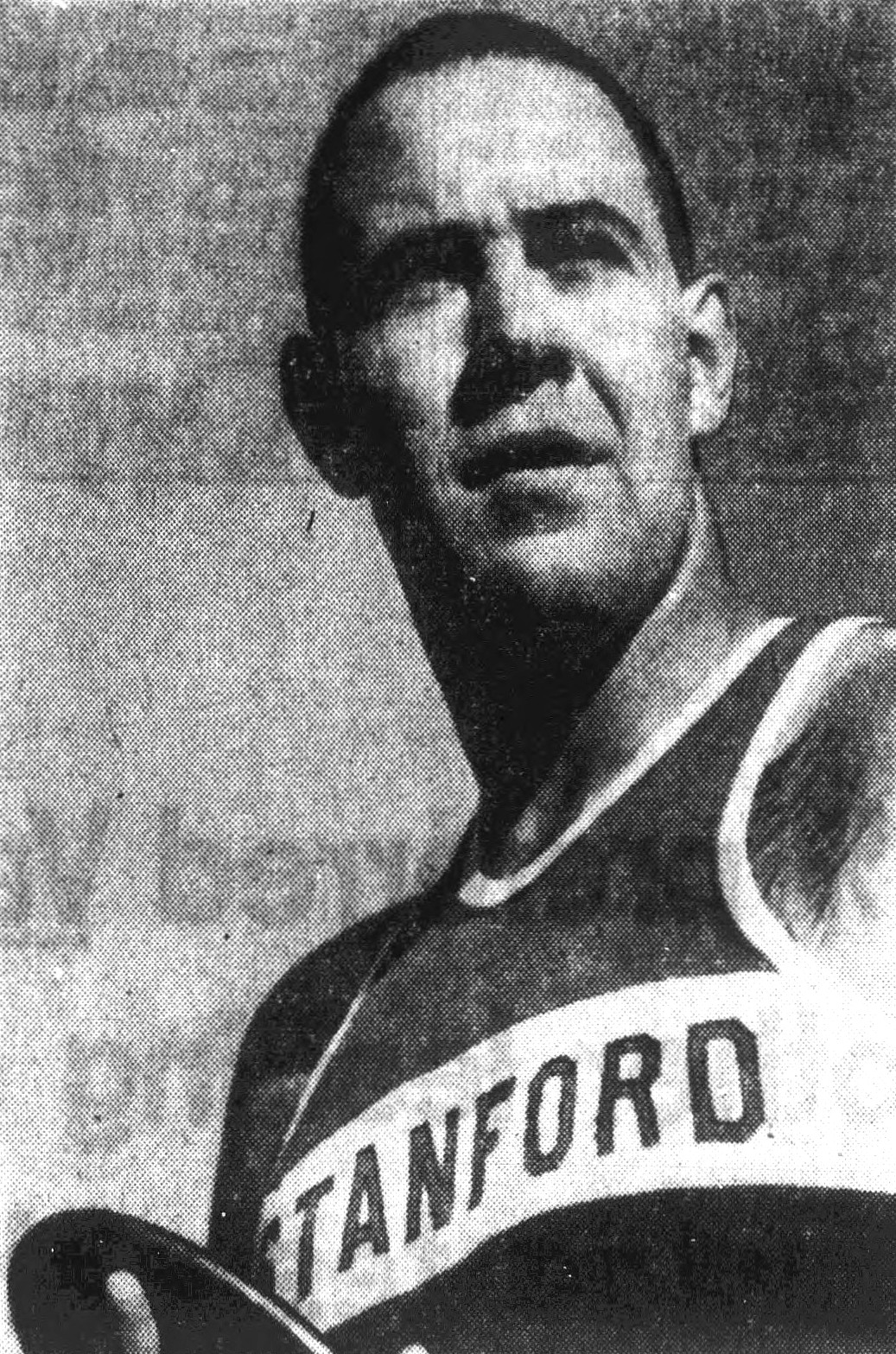
- Weill, circa 1963
- Born: David Lawson Weill; October 25, 1941 (age 84); Berkeley, California, U.S.
- Occupation: Athlete
- Height: 6 ft 7 in (2.01 m)

Medal record

Discus

Representing United States

Olympic Games
Bronze medal – third place	1964 Tokyo	Discus throw

Competition record

Discus

US NCAA
1st	1962
1st	1963

US Final Trials
3rd	1964

David Lawson Weill (born October 25, 1941, in Berkeley, California) is an American former athlete who competed mainly in the discus throw.

== Biography ==
While at Stanford Weill won the 1962 and 1963 NCAA. He competed for the United States in the 1964 Summer Olympics held in Tokyo, Japan in the discus throw where he won the bronze medal, an achievement magnified by the fact that he had only finished third the 1964 US Olympic Trials. He also finished third on three occasions in the US AAU championships. In 1967 he threw his personal best of 62.99m at the Sacramento Invitational Meet, although this was not enough to win the event and he finished third.
