= Amos Gilad =

Israeli middle-distance runner

Personal information
- Native name: עמוס גלעד
- National team: Israel
- Born: January 23, 1941 Israel
- Died: December 2010 (aged 69)

Sport
- Sport: Running
- Event: 800 metres

Achievements and titles
- Personal best: 800 m: 1:51.4 (1964)

Amos Gilad (Hebrew: עמוס גלעד; January 23, 1941–December 2010) was an Israeli Olympic runner.

When he competed in the Olympics, he was 5 feet 8 inches (173 cm) tall, and weighed 137 pounds (62 kg).

== Running career ==
Gilad won the Israeli 800 m national championships in 1961 (1:56.5) and 1962 (2:00.6).

In October 1964, he ran 800 meters in 1:51.9, three-tenths of a second short of his Israeli national record. His personal best in the 800 m is 1:51.4 (1964).

Gilad competed for Israel at the 1964 Summer Olympics in Tokyo, at the age of 23, in Athletics--Men's 800 metres. He ran in the fifth heat, but approximately 200 metres from the finish he was unable to run any longer because of severe leg pain, which was determined to be an Achilles tendon rupture.

He also competed for Israel in the 1965 Maccabiah Games in the 800 meters.
