= José Fernández (middle-distance runner) =

Spanish middle-distance runner

Personal information
- Full name: José Fernández Serrano
- Nationality: Spanish
- Born: 1 February 1933 (age 93)

Sport
- Sport: Middle-distance running
- Event: Steeplechase

José Fernández Serrano (born 1 February 1933) is a Spanish middle-distance runner. He competed in the men's 3000 metres steeplechase at the 1960 Summer Olympics.
