= Nikolay Sokolov (runner) =

Medal record

Men's athletics

Representing Soviet Union

Olympic Games
Silver medal – second place	1960 Rome	3000 m st.

European Championships
Bronze medal – third place	1962 Belgrade	3000 m st.

Nikolay Nikolayevich Sokolov (Russian: Никола́й Никола́евич Соколов) (28 August 1930 – 12 May 2010) was a Soviet athlete who competed mainly in the 3000 metre steeplechase. Born in the village of Vasyunino, Vologodsky District, Vologda Oblast, he trained at Lokomotiv in Vologda. He competed for the USSR in the 1960 Summer Olympics held in Rome, Italy in the 3000 metre steeplechase where he won the silver medal.
