= Semyon Rzhishchin =

Soviet steeplechase runner (1933–1986)

Medal record

Men's athletics

Representing the Soviet Union

Olympic Games
Bronze medal – third place	1960 Rome	3000 m st.

European Championships
Silver medal – second place	1958 Stockholm	3000 m st.

Semyon Ivanovich Rzhishchin (Russian: Семен Иванович Ржищин) (15 February 1933 - 27 December 1986) was a Soviet athlete who competed mainly in the 3000 metre steeple chase. He was born in Ryazan Oblast and trained in Moscow at the Armed Forces sports society.

On August 14, 1956, competing in the first Spartakiad of the Peoples of the USSR, he broke the World Record in the 3000 metre steeple chase. He competed for the USSR in the 1960 Summer Olympics held in Rome, Italy in the 3000 metre steeple chase where he won the bronze medal.

Records
Preceded by Jerzy Chromik; Sándor Rozsnyói	Men's 3000 m steeplechase world record holder August 14, 1956 – September 16, 1956; July 21, 1958 – August 2, 1958	Succeeded by Sándor Rozsnyói; Jerzy Chromik
