= Malín Falú =

Puerto Rican journalist and model

Malín Falú (born June 28, 1946) is an American journalist and model from Puerto Rico. She is a popular personality on Spanish language radio in New York City.

The daughter of Juan Falú Zarzuela and Malén Pesante, she was born in Santurce. Her sister is Georgina Falú. Falú received a bachelor's degree in social science from the University of Puerto Rico and a master's degree from the New School of Social Research. She also attended the Allen & Singer Broadcasting School in New Jersey.

Falú worked as a model in New York City and was host of a Spanish language version of the television program Soul Train.

In 1973, she was named Woman of the Year by El Nuevo Día.

In 2006, her program Diálogo de Costa a Costa received a Beacon Award from the Association of Cable Communicators.
