= Jerzy Chromik =

Polish long-distance runner (1931–1987)

Personal information
- Nationality: Polish
- Born: 15 June 1931 Mysłowice, Poland
- Died: 21 October 1987 (aged 56) Katowice, Poland

Sport
- Sport: middle-distance running
- Event: 3000 metres steeplechase
Medal record
Representing Poland
Men's athletics
European Championships
Gold medal – first place	1958 Stockholm	3000 m st.

Jerzy Chromik (15 June 1931 in Mysłowice – 21 October 1987 in Katowice) was a foremost long-distance runner from Poland.

== Biography ==
Chromik took eight national titles at long distances: 3000 m steeplechase (1952, 1954, 1956, 1960, 1961, 1962), 5000 m (1953), 10,000 m (1955).

He participated in three European Championships in Athletics in Bern (1954), Stockholm (1958), Belgrade (1962). He also took place in the 1956 Summer Olympics in Melbourne (1956), and the 17th Olympic Games in Rome (1960).

In 1955, Chromik won the 5.000 metres, ahead of Sándor Iharos, József Kovács, Emil Zátopek, and Zdzisław Krzyszkowiak, at the International Youth Festival in Warsaw. In 1955 and 1958, he won the 3000m in the Kusocinski Memorial in Warsaw. In the 1958 European Championship at Stockholm, he won gold medal at the 3000m steeplechase. In 1959, he won a Cross L'Humanité in Paris.

Chromik set the 3000m steeplechase world records with 8:41.2 in Brno (August 1955), 8:40.2 in Budapest (September 1955), and 8:32.0 in Warsaw (August 1958).

== International competitions ==
Representing Poland
Year	Competition	Venue	Position	Event	Notes
1953	World Festival of Youth and Students	Bucharest, Romania	8th	1500 m	3:52.8
1953	World Festival of Youth and Students	Bucharest, Romania	6th	5000 m	14:21.6
1954	European Championships	Bern, Switzerland	9th (h)	3000 m s'chase	9:06.4^{1}
1955	World Festival of Youth and Students	Warsaw, Poland	1st	5000 m	13:55.2
1956	Olympic Games	Melbourne, Australia	19th (h)	5000 m	14:51.4
1958	European Championships	Stockholm, Sweden	1st	3000 m s'chase	8:38.2
1960	Olympic Games	Rome, Italy	22nd (h)	3000 m s'chase	9:06.68
1962	European Championships	Belgrade, Yugoslavia	17th (h)	3000 m s'chase	8:54.0

^{1}Did not start in the final

== Personal bests ==
Outdoors

- 800 metres – 1:52.2
- 1000 metres – 2:28.6
- 1500 metres – 3:44.8
- 3000 metres – 7:56.4
- 5000 metres – 13:51.0 (1956)
- 10 000 metres – 29:10.0
- 3000 metres steeplechase – 8:32.0 (1958)

Records
Preceded by (Soviet Union) Vasili Vlasenko	Men's Steeplechase World Record Holder; 31 August 1955 – 14 August 1956	Succeeded by (Soviet Union) Semyon Rzhishchin
Preceded by (Soviet Union) Semyon Rzhishchin	Men's Steeplechase World Record Holder; 2 August 1958 – 26 June 1960	Succeeded by (Poland) Zdzisław Krzyszkowiak
