= Walter Kammermann =

Swiss middle-distance runner (1931–2026)

Personal information
- Nationality: Swiss
- Born: 6 December 1931 Zürich, Switzerland
- Died: 30 July 2026 (aged 94)

Sport
- Sport: Middle-distance running
- Event: Steeplechase

Walter Kammermann (6 December 1931 – 30 July 2026) was a Swiss middle-distance runner. He competed in the men's 3000 metres steeplechase at the 1960 Summer Olympics. He was a nine-time national champion and later a trainer. Kammermann died on 30 July 2026, at the age of 94.
