= Hartmut Losch =

East German discus thrower

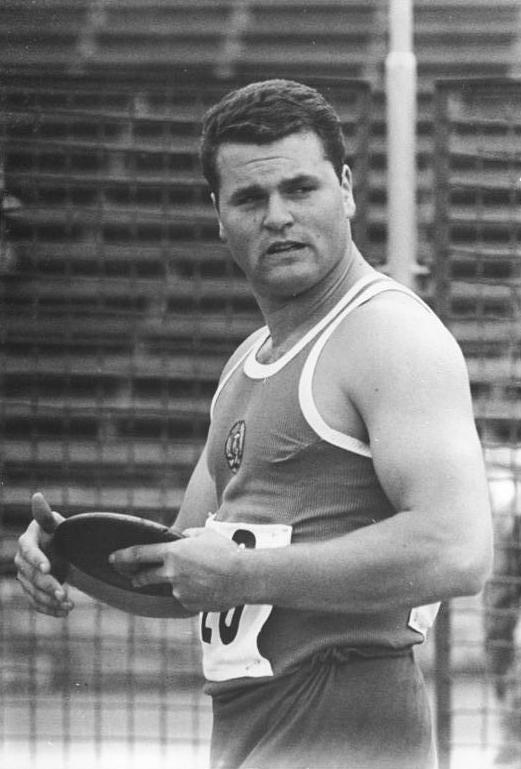
- Losch in 1967

Personal information
- Nationality: East Germany
- Born: 11 September 1943 Angermünde, Germany
- Died: 26 March 1997 (aged 53) Neu Fahrland, Potsdam, Germany
- Height: 1.92 m (6 ft 4 in)
- Weight: 120 kg (265 lb)

Sport
- Country: East Germany
- Sport: Athletics
- Event: Discus throw
- Club: ASK Vorwärts Potsdam

Achievements and titles
- Personal best: 64.36 m (1972)
Medal record
Men's athletics
Representing East Germany
European Championships
Gold medal – first place	1969 Athens	Discus
Silver medal – second place	1966 Budapest	Discus

Hartmut Losch (11 September 1943 in Angermünde – 26 March 1997 in Neu Fahrland) was a German athlete who competed in the 1964 Summer Olympics, in the 1968 Summer Olympics, and in the 1972 Summer Olympics.
