= Vlastimil Brlica =

Czech middle-distance runner (1928–2019)

Personal information
- Nationality: Czech
- Born: 2 December 1928 Brodek u Přerova, Czechoslovakia
- Died: 18 March 2019 (aged 90)

Sport
- Sport: Middle-distance running
- Event: Steeplechase

Vlastimil Brlica (2 December 1928 – 18 March 2019) was a Czech middle-distance runner. He competed in the men's 3000 metres steeplechase at the 1960 Summer Olympics.
