= Cees Koch (discus thrower) =

Dutch discus thrower and shot putter (1936–2021)

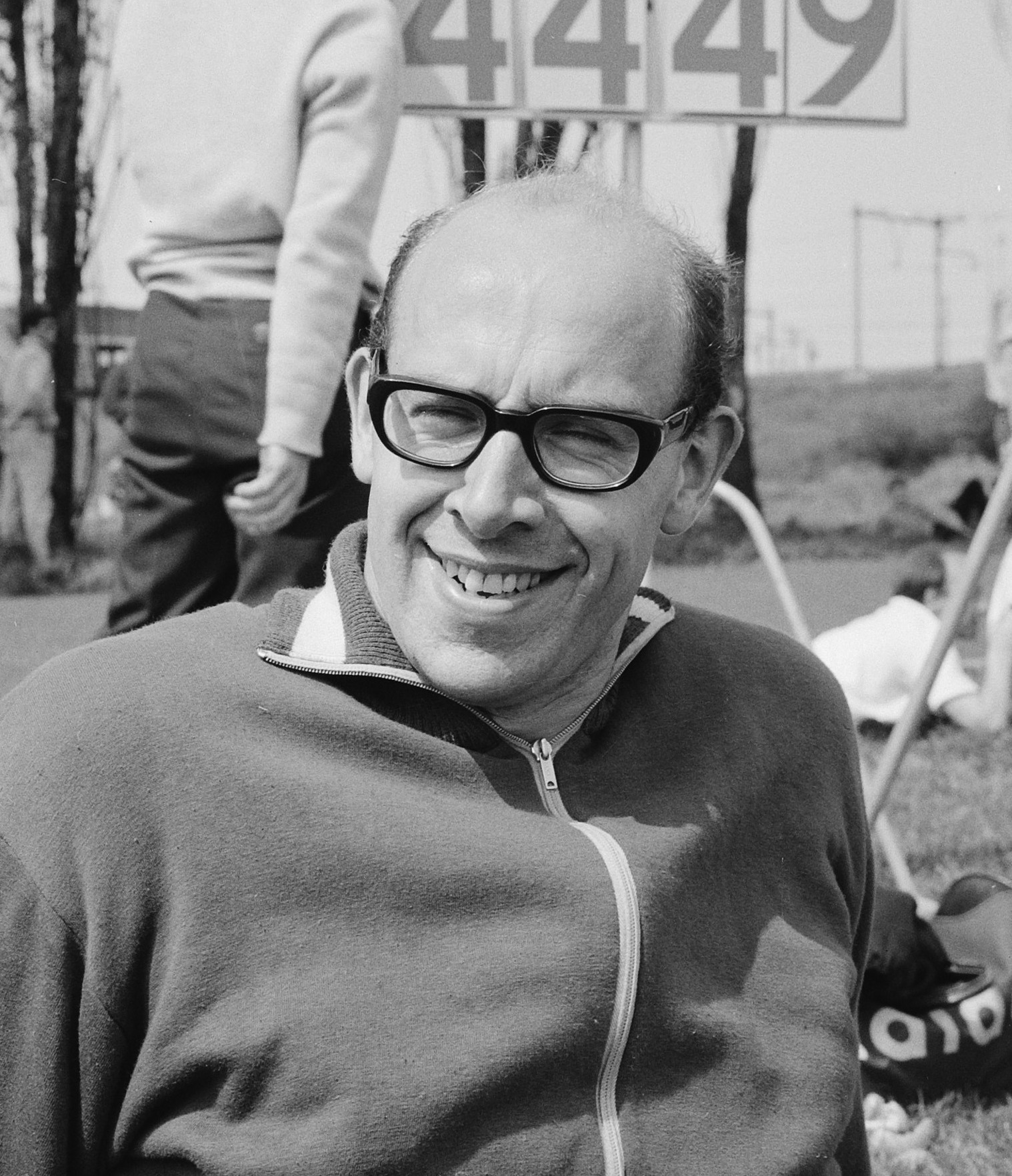
- Koch in 1964

Personal information
- Born: 16 July 1936 Rotterdam, Netherlands
- Died: 14 September 2021 (aged 85) Heemstede, Netherlands
- Height: 1.91 m (6 ft 3 in)
- Weight: 110 kg (240 lb)

Sport
- Sport: Discus throw
- Club: Pro Patria, Rotterdam
Medal record
Men's athletics
Representing Netherlands
European Championships
Silver medal – second place	1962 Belgrade	Discus throw

Cornelis "Cees" Koch (16 July 1936 – 14 September 2021) was a Dutch discus thrower and shot putter. As a discus thrower, he competed at the 1960 and 1964 Summer Olympics and finished in 22nd and 17th place, respectively.

With a throw of 55.96m, he won a silver medal at the 1962 European Championships in Belgrade, behind Soviet Union's Vladimir Trusenyev (57.11m). In the late 1950s and early 1960s, Koch collected sixteen Dutch titles altogether, seven in shot put and nine in discus throw.

Koch finished second behind Elfranco Malan in the discus throw event at the British 1961 AAA Championships.

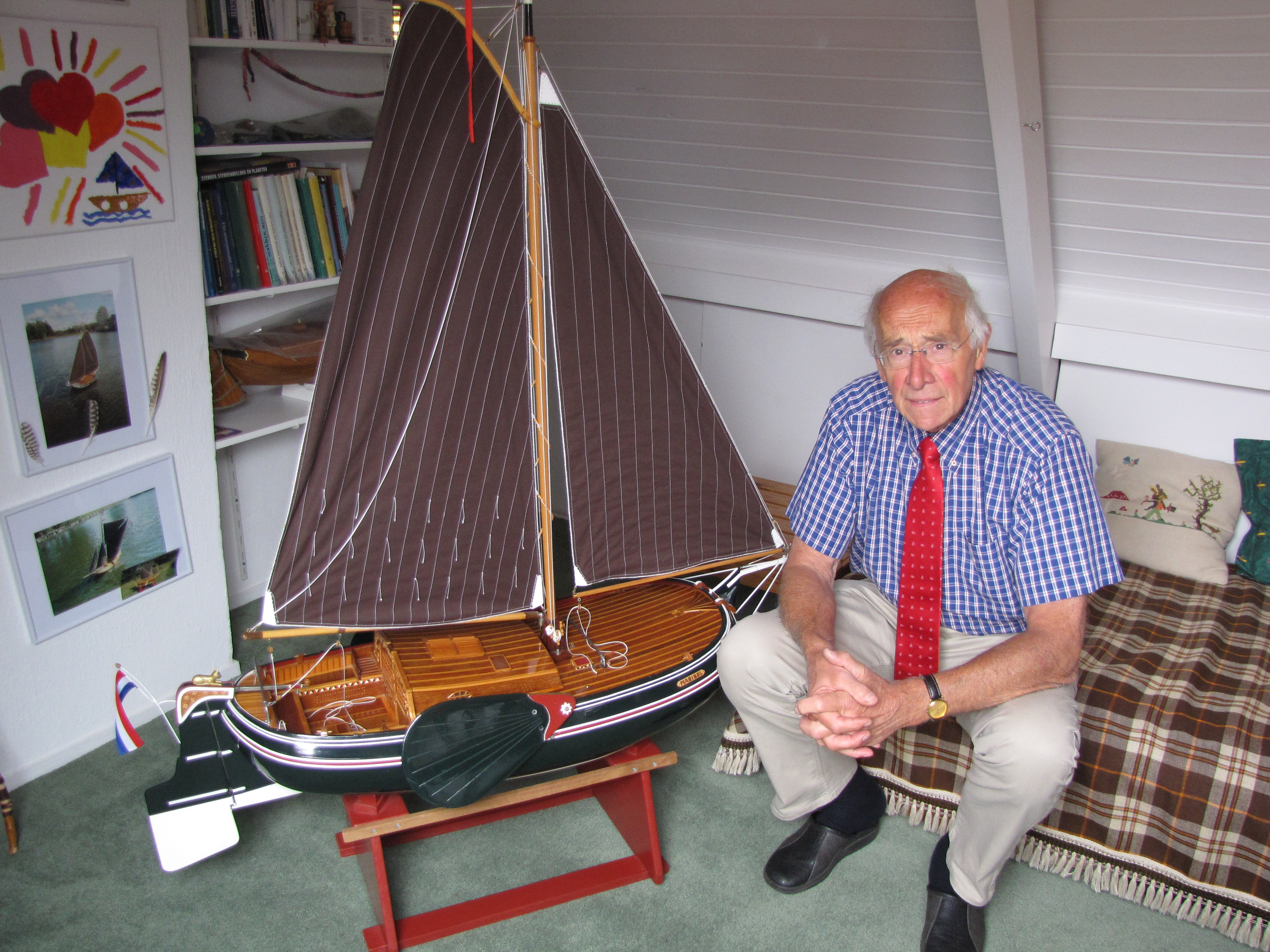
Koch in 2010 with a self-made model of a Dutch boat

== Sources ==
- Cees Koch's obituary (in Dutch)

Awards
Preceded by Eef Kamerbeek	Herman van Leeuwen Cup; 1961, 1962	Succeeded by Henk Evers
