= Kim Byeong-gi (discus thrower) =

South Korean discus thrower

Personal information
- Nationality: South Korean
- Born: 13 February 1938 (age 88)

Sport
- Sport: Athletics
- Event: Discus throw

Kim Byeong-gi (born 13 February 1938) is a South Korean athlete. He competed in the men's discus throw at the 1964 Summer Olympics.

At the 44th Korean National Sports Festival, Kim set a South Korean record in the discus with a 46.20 m throw, beating the old mark of 45.78 m.
