= Todor Artarski =

Bulgarian discus thrower

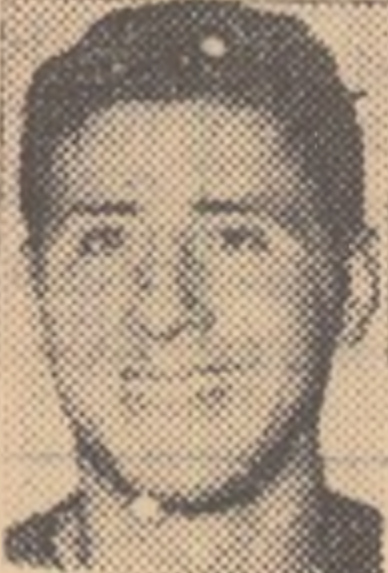

Personal information
- Full name: Todor Arkadi Todorow Artarski
- Nationality: Bulgarian
- Born: 30 January 1935 (age 91) Novachene, Bulgaria

Sport
- Sport: Athletics
- Event: Discus throw
Medal record
Men's athletics
Representing Bulgaria
European Championships
Silver medal – second place	1958 Stockholm	Discus throw

Todor Arkadi Todorov Artarski (Bulgarian: Тодор Аркади Тодоров Артарски; born 30 January 1935) is a Bulgarian athlete. He competed in the men's discus throw at the 1960 Summer Olympics.
