= Rainer Dörner =

German middle-distance runner

Personal information
- Nationality: German
- Born: 28 August 1937 (age 88)

Sport
- Sport: Middle-distance running
- Event: Steeplechase

Rainer Dörner (born 28 August 1937) is a German middle-distance runner. He competed in the men's 3000 metres steeplechase at the 1964 Summer Olympics.
