= Carol Lindroos =

Finnish discus thrower

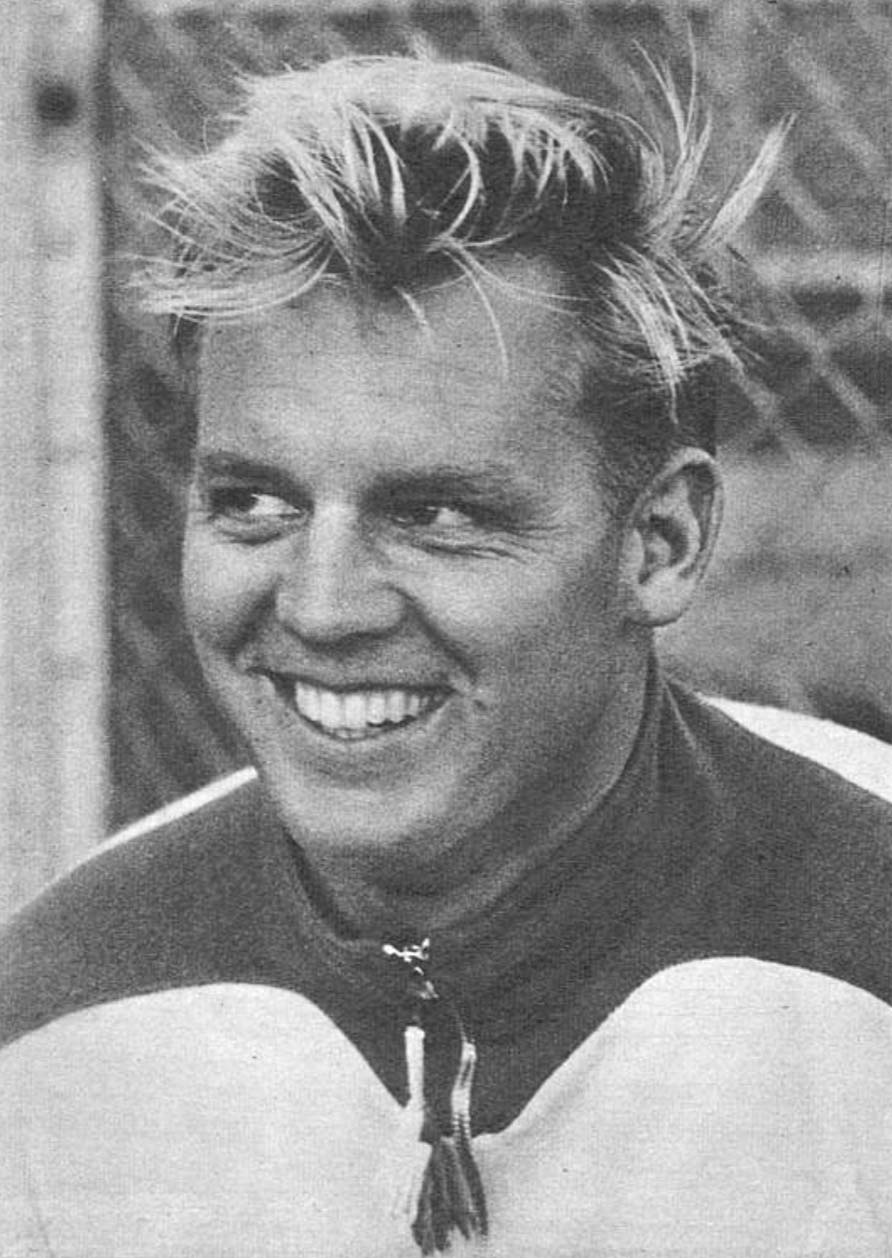

Personal information
- Nationality: Finnish
- Born: 29 May 1930 Pohja, Raasepori, Finland
- Died: 9 December 2001 (aged 71) Västanfjärd, Kemiönsaari, Finland
- Height: 187 cm (6 ft 2 in)
- Weight: 95–102 kg (209–225 lb)

Sport
- Sport: Athletics
- Event: Discus throw
- Club: Turun Urheiluliitto

Carol Oskar Eugen Lindroos (29 May 1930 – 9 December 2001) was a Finnish athlete. He competed in the men's discus throw at the 1960 Summer Olympics.

Lindroos finished second behind Jay Silvester in the discus throw event at the 1962 AAA Championships.
