= Bohumír Zháňal =

Czech middle-distance runner (1931–2020)

Personal information
- Nationality: Czech
- Born: 17 October 1931 Moravský Žižkov, Czechoslovakia
- Died: 16 April 2020 (aged 88)

Sport
- Sport: Middle-distance running
- Event: Steeplechase

Bohumír Zháňal (17 October 1931 – 16 April 2020) was a Czech middle-distance runner. He competed in the men's 3000 metres steeplechase at the 1960 Summer Olympics.
