= Viktor Kompaniyets =

Ukrainian discus thrower

Personal information
- Nationality: Ukrainian
- Born: 21 March 1937 (age 88)

Sport
- Sport: Athletics
- Event: Discus throw

Viktor Kompaniyets (Ukrainian: Віктор Компанієць; born 21 March 1937) is a Ukrainian former athlete. He competed in the men's discus throw at the 1960 Summer Olympics and the 1964 Summer Olympics, representing the Soviet Union.
