= Jiří Žemba =

Czech discus thrower

Personal information
- Nationality: Czech
- Born: 17 November 1939 Třebíč, Protectorate of Bohemia and Moravia
- Died: 31 July 1981 (aged 41) Karlovy Vary, Czechoslovakia

Sport
- Sport: Athletics
- Event: Discus throw
Medal record
Representing Czechoslovakia
Summer Universiade
Silver medal – second place	1965 Budapest	Discus throw

Jiří Žemba (17 November 1939 – 31 July 1981) was a Czech athlete. He competed for Czechoslovakia in the men's discus throw at the 1964 Summer Olympics.
