= Lars Haglund =

Swedish discus thrower

Lars Gösta Haglund
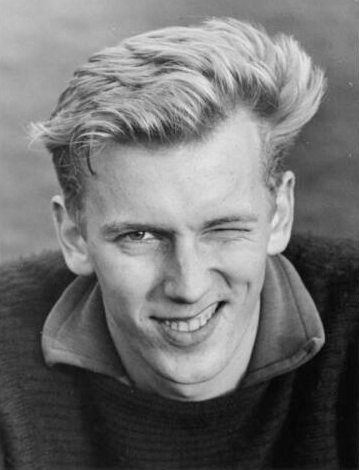

Personal information
- Born: 22 May 1940 (age 86) Stockholm, Sweden
- Height: 6 ft 6 in (1.98 m)
- Weight: 251 lb (114 kg)

Sport
- Sport: Athletics
- Events: Discus throw, shot put, javelin throw
- Club: Westermalms IF; SoIK Hellas; Spårvägens FK

Achievements and titles
- Personal bests: DT – 62.86 (1974); SP – 15.23 m JT – 63.91 m
Medal record
Representing Sweden
Olympic Games
Qualified	1964 Tokyo	Discus throw
Universiade
Gold medal – first place	1965 Budapest	Discus throw
British National Championships (AAA)
Gold medal – first place	1965	Discus throw

Lars Gösta Haglund (born 22 May 1940) is a retired Swedish discus thrower who competed at the 1964 Summer Olympics. In 1965 he won the discus throw at the Summer Universiade and British AAA Athletics Championships. Haglund was the Swedish champion in the discus in 1962–66 and held multiple national records in this event.

Haglund won the British AAA Championships title in the discus throw event at the 1965 AAA Championships.
