= George Puce =

Canadian discus thrower

Personal information
- Born: December 29, 1940 (age 85)
Medal record
Men's Athletics
Representing Canada
Commonwealth Games
Gold medal – first place	1970 Edinburgh	Discus Throw
Pan American Games
Bronze medal – third place	1967 Winnipeg	Discus Throw
Summer Universiade
Bronze medal – third place	1965 Budapest	Discus Throw

George Puce (Latvian: Juris Pūce: born December 29, 1940, in Jelgava) is a retired discus thrower, who represented Canada at the 1968 Summer Olympics. He won the bronze medal in the men's discus throw event at the 1967 Pan American Games.
