= Aleksey Konov =

Soviet middle-distance runner

Personal information
- Nationality: Soviet
- Born: 3 March 1938 (age 88) Moscow, Soviet Union

Sport
- Sport: Middle-distance running
- Event: Steeplechase

Aleksey Konov (Russian: Алексе́й Коно́в; born 3 March 1938) is a Soviet middle-distance runner. He competed in the men's 3000 metres steeplechase at the 1960 Summer Olympics.
