= József Szécsényi =

Hungarian discus thrower

Personal information
- Born: 10 January 1932 Szegvár, Hungary
- Died: 19 March 2017 (aged 85)

Sport
- Sport: Athletics
- Event: Discus throw
Medal record
Men's athletics
Representing Hungary
European Championships
Bronze medal – third place	1954 Bern	Discus throw

József Szécsényi (10 January 1932 – 19 March 2017) was a Hungarian track and field athlete, who competed in the discus throw event. He was the bronze medallist at the 1954 European Athletics Championships, becoming Hungary's second such medallist in the event after István Donogán.

Szécsényi was multiple Hungarian champion in discus (1955–1956, 1958–63, 1965). He participated in two Olympic Games (1960, 1964), reaching the final both times. He represented Hungary three times at the European Athletics Championships (1954, 1958, 1962).

He also competed as a student-athlete and was a medallist at the 1954 World Student Games, 1957 World University Games and the World Festival of Youth and Students in 1955 and 1962.
