= Vladimir Trusenyov =

Russian discus thrower

Personal information
- Born: 3 August 1931 Buinsk, Russian SFSR, Soviet Union
- Died: 2001 (aged 69–70)
- Height: 191 cm (6 ft 3 in)
- Weight: 112 kg (247 lb)

Sport
- Sport: Athletics
- Event: Discus throw

Achievements and titles
- Personal best: 61.64 (1962)
Medal record
Men's athletics
Representing Soviet Union
European Championships
Gold medal – first place	1962 Belgrade	Discus throw
Bronze medal – third place	1958 Stockholm	Discus throw

Vladimir Ivanovich Trusenyov (Russian: Владимир Иванович Трусенёв; 3 August 1931 – 2001) was a Russian discus thrower who won a European title in 1962 and placed third in 1958. In 1962 he held a world record for a few weeks. He competed in the 1960 and 1964 Summer Olympics and finished 15th and 8th, respectively.

Trusenyov took up athletics in the mid-1950s and won the Soviet title in 1962, 1964, 1965 and 1966, placing second in 1958 and third in 1957. After retiring from competitions he worked as an athletics coach until 1996.
