= Deaths in February 2001 =

The following is a list of notable deaths in February 2001.

Entries for each day are listed alphabetically by surname. A typical entry lists information in the following sequence:

- Name, age, country of citizenship at birth, subsequent country of citizenship (if applicable), reason for notability, cause of death (if known), and reference.

== February 2001 ==
=== 1 ===
- Vinnie Burke, 79, American jazz bassist.
- Nikolay Devyatkov, 93, Soviet and Russian scientist and inventor.
- Sam Harshaney, 90, American baseball player (St. Louis Browns).
- Charley House, 88, American baseball player.
- Harry How, 81, Canadian politician.
- John Jarrard, 47, American country music songwriter, respiratory failure.
- Amryl Johnson, 56, Trinidadian poet and writer.
- Robert Lichello, 74, American author.
- Harold Maguire, 88, British air marshal and Director-General of Intelligence.
- Rafael Lapesa Melgar, 92, Spanish philologist and literature historian.
- John Pierrakos, 79, Greek-American physician and psychiatrist.
- Leslie Vincent, 91, American actor (Forever Amber, Destry Rides Again, Paris Underground).

=== 2 ===
- June Lazenby Green, 87, American district judge of the United States District Court for the District of Columbia.
- Carol Anne Letheren, 58, Canadian Olympic Association official, brain aneurysm.
- Nicole Henriot-Schweitzer, 75, French classical pianist.
- Freddy Wittop, 89, Dutch costume designer (winner of Tony Award for Best Costume Design for Hello Dolly!).

=== 3 ===
- Bobby Colburn, 89, American basketball player.
- Helmut Gude, 75, German Olympic middle-distance runner (1952).
- Otmar Kaufhold, 48, German Olympic rower (1976).
- Frederick Lawton, 89, British judge.
- Teiichi Nishi, 93, Japanese Olympic sprinter (1932).
- Gerald Suster, 49, British revisionist historian, occult writer, and novelist.

=== 4 ===
- Wilhelm Altvater, 80, German politician and member of the Bundestag.
- Sonia Arova, 73, Bulgarian ballerina, pancreatic cancer.
- Jean Ausseil, 75, Monegasque politician, Minister of State (1985 and 1991).
- David Beattie, 76, New Zealand jurist and Governor-General.
- Gord Brydson, 94, Canadian ice hockey player (Toronto Maple Leafs).
- Šime Bujas, 74, Croatian Olympic rower (1948).
- Barry Cockcroft, 68, British television documentary director and filmmaker (Too Long a Winter), amyotrophic lateral sclerosis.
- Alyaksandar Dubko, 63, Belarusian politician.
- Larry Fisher, 93, American real estate developer and philanthropist.
- J. J. Johnson, 77, American jazz trombonist, suicide by gunshot.
- Raimo Kangro, 51, Estonian composer.
- Alois Lipburger, 44, Austrian ski jumper, traffic collision.
- Dragan Maksimović, 51, Serbian actor, beaten.
- Allan Mansley, 54, English football player, heart attack.
- Ernie McCoy, 79, American racecar driver.
- Natalia Melmann, 15, Argentinian murder victim.
- Fred Murphy, 62, American football player (Cleveland Browns, Minnesota Vikings).
- Pankaj Roy, 72, Indian cricketer.
- Tony Steedman, 73, English actor.
- Iannis Xenakis, 78, Greek-French composer.

=== 5 ===
- Jean Davy, 89, French actor.
- Mark Joseph Hurley, 81, American Roman Catholic prelate, aneurysm.
- David Iftody, 44, Canadian member of Parliament (House of Commons for Provencher, Manitoba), snowmobile accident.
- Elsa Irigoyen, 81, Argentine Olympic fencer (1948, 1952).
- Jerry McQuaig, 89, American baseball player (Philadelphia Athletics).
- Louise Moreau, 80, French politician.
- Harry Wendell Reeves, 90, American Olympic sports shooter (1952).
- Gerald Scherba, 73, American biologist, congestive heart failure.
- Jack Shapiro, 93, American gridiron football player.
- Fernando Viola, 49, Italian football player, traffic collision.
- Jean Denton, Baroness Denton of Wakefield, 65, British politician and racing driver.
- Inna Zubkovskaya, 77, Russian ballerina.

=== 6 ===
- Geoffrey Bibby, 83, English-Danish archaeologist.
- Kojo Botsio, 84, Ghanaian diplomat and politician.
- Gus Boulis, 51, Greek-born American businessman and murder victim, homicide.
- Fulgence Charpentier, 103, French Canadian journalist, editor and publisher, pneumonia.
- Stephen Halaiko, 92, American Olympic boxer (1928).
- Agha Hilaly, 90, Pakistani diplomat.
- Arthur W. Hummel, 80, American diplomat.
- Jack Hyles, 74, American Baptist megachurch pastor, heart failure.
- Filemon Lagman, 47, Filipino revolutionary socialist and workers' leader, shot in an ambush.
- Folke Lind, 87, Swedish football player and Olympian (1936).
- R. W. Southern, 88, British medieval historian.
- Charles Tran Van Lam, 87, South Vietnamese diplomat and politician.
- Emily Vermeule, 72, American classical scholar and archaeologist, heart disease.

=== 7 ===
- Jean-Paul Beugnot, 69, French basketball player, coach, and Olympian (1952, 1956, 1960).
- Marianne Breslauer, 91, German photographer and photojournalist.
- Dieter Dengler, 62, German-American aviator and Vietnam War prisoner-of-war escapee (Little Dieter Needs to Fly), suicide by gunshot.
- Dale Evans, 88, American actress, singer and wife of singing cowboy Roy Rogers, congestive heart failure.
- Michael Grylls, 66, British politician.
- Helmut Hentrich, 95, German architect.
- Anne Morrow Lindbergh, 94, American author, aviator, and wife of aviator Charles Lindbergh, stroke.
- Stanley Lingar, 37, American convicted murderer, execution by lethal injection.
- King Moody, 71, American actor (Get Smart) and comedian.

=== 8 ===
- Ivo Caprino, 80, Norwegian film director and writer, cancer.
- Roger Delage, 78, French musicologist and conductor.
- Leslie Edwards, 84, British ballet dancer, cancer.
- Arlene Eisenberg, 66, American family and parenting writer (What to Expect When You're Expecting), breast cancer.
- Walter Generati, 87, Italian road bicycle racer.
- Pauline Koner, 88, American dancer and choreographer.
- Chen Lifu, 100, Chinese politician and anti-communist of the Republic of China.
- Muboraksho Mirzoshoyev, 39, Tajikistani musician and Tajik rock music pioneer, tuberculosis.
- Brian Nissen, 73, British actor and television announcer.
- R. J. Rushdoony, 84, American historian, theologian and father of Christian Reconstructionism.

=== 9 ===
- Agustín Cárdenas, 73, Cuban sculptor.
- Vicente Dauder, 76, Spanish football goalkeeper and manager.
- William Epstein, 88, Canadian civil servant and United Nations disarmament official.
- Pat Kirkwood, 73, American racing driver.
- Leonard Mandel, 73, American physicist.
- Reginald Marsh, 74, English actor.
- José Rochel, 57, Spanish Olympic handball player (1972).
- Gunnar Seidenfaden, 92, Danish diplomat and botanist.
- Herbert A. Simon, 84, American economist (Nobel Prize in Economics, Turing Award), surgical complications.
- Dilbagh Singh, 74, Indian air marshal.

=== 10 ===
- Ramzan Akhmadov, 31, Chechen general, killed in action.
- Lewis Arquette, 65, American actor (The Waltons, Tango & Cash, Scream 2), heart failure.
- Abraham Beame, 94, American politician, 104th Mayor of New York City (1974–1977), surgical complications.
- Kenneth E. BeLieu, 87, American government official, cancer.
- Helge Bengtsson, 84, Swedish football player.
- K. Thavamani Devi, Sri Lankan actress.
- Niccolò Galli, 17, Italian promising footballer, moped crash.
- Johnny Hatley, 70, American football player (Chicago Bears, Chicago Cardinals, Denver Broncos), coach, executive, and rodeo performer.
- Mogubai Kurdikar, 96, Indian classical vocalist.
- Robert H. Lounsberry, 82, American politician.
- Miné Okubo, 88, American artist and writer.
- René Schroeder, 80, Luxembourgian Olympic gymnast (1948, 1952).
- Buddy Tate, 87, American jazz saxophonist and clarinetist (Count Basie Orchestra).

=== 11 ===
- Jean-Charles Richard Berger, 76, Canadian politician, member of the House of Commons of Canada (1963-1968).
- José Luis Borbolla, 81, Mexican footballer.
- Claude Desouches, 89, French Olympic sailor (1936, 1948).
- Edward E. Fitzgerald, 81, American sports author and editor (Book of the Month Club), complications from a stroke.
- Sy Gomberg, 82, American screenwriter (When Willie Comes Marching Home), heart attack.
- Olle Håkansson, 73, Swedish football player.
- Jaiganesh, Indian Tamil film actor, cancer.
- Raymond Lewis, 48, American basketball and streetball player, complications following leg amputation.
- Masao Ono, 77, Japanese football player, ruptured abdominal aneurysm.
- Charles C. Price, 87, American chemist.
- John Saunders, 50, American football player (Buffalo Bills, San Francisco 49ers).
- Donald Sellers, 26, American gridiron football player, traffic accident.
- Judita Vaičiūnaitė, 63, Lithuanian writer.
- Maurice Zermatten, 90, French-speaking Swiss writer.

=== 12 ===
- Bhakti Barve, 52, Indian actress, traffic collision.
- Rosalie Gwathmey, 92, American painter and photographer.
- Tiberio Mitri, 74, Italian boxer, railway accident.
- Franco Pedroni, 74, Italian football player and manager.
- Herbert Robbins, 86, American mathematician, statistician and co-author of What is Mathematics?.
- Ralph Smart, 92, Australian film and television producer.
- Kristina Söderbaum, 88, Swedish-German film actress, producer and photographer.

=== 13 ===
- Ugo Fano, 88, Italian-American physicist, Alzheimer's disease.
- Frank Gosling, 83, Bermudian Olympic diver (1948, 1952).
- Manuela, 57, German singer, cancer.
- Moses Taiwa Molelekwa, 27, South African jazz pianist, murdered.
- Bent Pedersen, 72, Danish footballer.
- George T. Simon, 88, American jazz writer and drummer, pneumonia.
- Montague Woodhouse, 5th Baron Terrington, 83, British politician, heart attack.
- Owen Torrey, 75, American sailor and Olympic medalist (1948).
- Victor Veysey, 85, American politician.

=== 14 ===
- Max Charbit, 92, French footballer.
- Gerald Clawson, 83, Canadian Olympic swimmer (1936).
- Charles B. Fitzsimons, 76, Irish-American actor, film producer and director, liver disease.
- Guy Grosso, 67, French actor and humorist.
- Forrest Hall, 79, American football player (San Francisco 49ers).
- Richard Laymon, 54, American horror author, heart attack.
- Maurice Levitas, 84, Irish-born British sociologist.
- Alan Ross, 78, Indian-British poet and editor.
- Ploutis Servas, 93, Cypriot politician, journalist, and author.
- Piero Umiliani, 74, Italian composer of film scores.
- Helmut Wielandt, 90, German mathematician.
- Jim Winkler, 73, American football player (Los Angeles Rams, Baltimore Colts).

=== 15 ===
- Boris Goldovsky, 92, Russian-American conductor and broadcaster.
- Dulal Guha, 72, Indian film director of Bollywood films in the 1960s and '70s.
- Burt Kennedy, 78, American screenwriter and director (The War Wagon, Support Your Local Sheriff!, The Virginian, Combat!), cancer.
- Ken Kiff, 65, English figurative artist.
- Ricardo Otxoa, 26, Spanish cyclist, bicycle accident.
- Edwin Plowden, Baron Plowden of Plowden, 94, British industrialist and public servant, hypertension.
- Folke K. Skoog, 92, Swedish-American plant physiologist and Olympic runner (1932).

=== 16 ===
- Ali Artuner, 56, Turkish footballer, brain tumor.
- Bob Buhl, 72, American baseball player (Milwaukee Braves, Chicago Cubs, Philadelphia Phillies).
- Jerry Frei, 76, American football player (Wisconsin) and coach (Oregon, Denver Broncos, Tampa Bay Buccaneers, Chicago Bears).
- Howard W. Koch, 84, American film and television director and producer (The Manchurian Candidate, Maverick), Alzheimer's disease.
- William H. Masters, 85, American gynaecologist (Masters and Johnson), Parkinson's disease.
- Bobby Scarr, 74, Canadian Olympic basketball player (1948).
- Ludwig Schlanger, 96, Austrian Olympic wrestler (1928).
- Helen Vita, 72, Swiss chanson singer, actress, and comedian, cancer.

=== 17 ===
- Debbie Dean, 73, American singer.
- Gilly Flower, 92, English actress and model.
- Bob Geary, 67, Canadian football player and manager in the Canadian Football League (CFL).
- Paulette Houtéer, 88, French Olympic gymnast (1928).
- Juan Liscano, 86, Venezuelan poet, folklorist, writer and critic.
- Marta Majowska, 89, Polish gymnast and Olympian (1936).
- Matild Manukyan, 87, Turkish businesswoman of Armenian descent, heart failure.
- Khalid Abdul Muhammad, 53, American black nationalist leader (Nation of Islam, New Black Panther Party), brain aneurysm.
- John Sutherland, 90, American film producer.
- Richard Wurmbrand, 91, Romanian Lutheran priest and academic.
- Zvonimir Červenko, 74, Croatian general.

=== 18 ===
- Balthus, 92, French painter.
- Roger A. Caras, 72, American wildlife photographer, writer, and television personality, heart attack.
- Sir Colin Cole, 78, British officer of arms.
- Claude Davey, 92, Welsh rugby union player.
- Dale Earnhardt, 49, American NASCAR race car driver, basilar skull fracture from a crash in the 2001 Daytona 500.
- Francisco Espinosa, 53, Argentine racing driver.
- Frank Bunker Gilbreth, Jr., 89, American journalist and author (Cheaper by the Dozen, Belles on Their Toes).
- Franso Hariri, 64, Iraqi Kurdish politician, assassinated.
- Eddie Mathews, 69, American baseball player (Boston/Milwaukee/Atlanta Braves, Houston Astros, Detroit Tigers), member of the Baseball Hall of Fame, pneumonia.
- Georgi Minchev, 57, Bulgarian rock musician and TV presenter, cancer.
- Arthur Moynihan, 77, Australian rugby league footballer.
- Panos Papadopulos, 80, German-Greek actor.
- Butch Wensloff, 85, American baseball player (New York Yankees, Cleveland Indians).

=== 19 ===
- Theophilus Beckford, 65, Jamaican pianist and vocalist, struck in the head with a machete.
- Stanley Kramer, 87, American film director and producer (It's a Mad, Mad, Mad, Mad World, The Defiant Ones, Judgment at Nuremberg), pneumonia.
- Federico López, 82, Cuban Olympic basketball player (1948, 1952).
- Guy Rodgers, 65, American basketball player, heart attack.
- Roland Stoltz, 69, Swedish ice hockey player and Olympian (1960, 1964, 1968).
- Charles Trenet, 87, French singer-songwriter, stroke.

=== 20 ===
- Harry Boykoff, 78, American basketball player (Waterloo Hawks, Boston Celtics, Tri-Cities Blackhawks), lung cancer.
- Irina Bugrimova, 90, Russian lion tamer, heart attack.
- John Bukowski, 62, Australian boxer and Olympian (1960, 1964).
- Rob Dawber, 45, British railwayman and writer (The Navigators), lung cancer caused by asbestos.
- Rosemary DeCamp, 90, American actress (Yankee Doodle Dandy, That Girl), pneumonia.
- Indrajit Gupta, 81, Indian politician.
- Lun Maung, Burmese army brigadier general, helicopter crash.
- Donella Meadows, 59, American environmental scientist, and writer, cerebral meningitis.
- Yogi Ramsuratkumar, 82, Indian saint and mystic.
- Bill Rigney, 83, American baseball player (New York Giants) and manager.
- Nam Sung-yong, 88, Korean long-distance runner and Olympic medalist (1936).
- Bob Weiskopf, 86, American screenwriter and producer for television.

=== 21 ===
- Georges Marie Anne, 94, Martiniquais politician.
- Alfred Embarrato, 91, American mobster (Bonanno crime family), natural causes.
- Ileana Espinel, 67, Ecuadorian journalist, poet and writer.
- Séraphin Ferrer, 69, French Olympic boxer (1952).
- Ronnie Hilton, 75, English singer ("No Other Love", "A Windmill in Old Amsterdam") and radio presenter (Sounds of the Fifties), stroke.
- Kim Jeong-sin, 81-82, South Korean Olympic basketball player (1948).
- Desmond Leslie, 79, British pilot, film maker, writer, and musician, pulmonary emphysema.
- John MacKay, Baron MacKay of Ardbrecknish, 62, British politician.
- José Lebrún Moratinos, 81, Venezuelan Roman Catholic cardinal, Archbishop of Caracas.
- Fido Purpur, 86, American ice hockey player (St. Louis Eagles, Chicago Black Hawks, Detroit Red Wings).
- Philip Sandblom, 97, Swedish academic and Olympic sailor (1928).
- Malcolm Yelvington, 82, American rockabilly and country musician.

=== 22 ===
- Dennis Cox, 75, British cricketer.
- John Fahey, 61, American guitarist and composer, complications from heart surgery.
- Radie Harris, 96, American journalist and newspaper columnist (The Hollywood Reporter).
- Evelyn Holt, 92, German actress.
- Jack Mead, 79, American football player (New York Giants).
- Les Medley, 80, England international footballer.
- Christopher Mitchell, 53, British actor, liver cancer.
- Michel Oksenberg, 62, Belgian-American political scientist and China watcher, cancer.
- Cledwyn Hughes, Baron Cledwyn of Penrhos, 84, British politician.
- André Pieters, 78, Belgian racing cyclist.
- Lloyd Roberts, 38, American musician, shot.

=== 23 ===
- Robert Enrico, 69, French film director and screenwriter, lung cancer.
- Anthony Giacalone, 82, American organized crime figure in Detroit, natural causes.
- Sergio Mantovani, 71, Italian racing driver.
- Caupolicán Ovalles, 64, Venezuelan avant-garde writer.
- Dame Ruth Railton, 85, British music director and conductor.
- Guy Wood, 89, English musician and songwriter.
- Tincho Zabala, 78, Uruguayan actor.

=== 24 ===
- Phil Collier, 75, American sportswriter (1990 winner of J. G. Taylor Spink Award), prostate cancer.
- Charles Fletcher-Cooke, 86, British politician.
- Hans Holtedahl, 83, Norwegian geologist.
- Andy Mulligan, 65, Irish rugby player.
- Alf Olsen, 75, Norwegian Olympic gymnast (1952).
- Claude Shannon, 84, American electrical engineer and mathematician, Alzheimer's disease.
- Manbahadur Tamang, 42-43, Nepalese Taekwondoist, murdered.

=== 25 ===
- Archie Randolph Ammons, 75, American poet and professor of English.
- Édouard Artigas, 94, French fencer and Olympic champion (1948).
- Nuhu Bamalli, 84, Nigerian politician.
- Helen Bennett, 89, American actress.
- Sir Donald Bradman, 92, Australian cricketer, pneumonia.
- Alfredo Álvarez Calderón, 82, Peruvian Olympic diver (1936).
- Donald Garrow, 83, British Olympic alpine skier (1948).
- Norbert Glanzberg, 90, French composer.
- Giovanni Grimaldi, 84, Italian screenwriter, journalist and film director.
- Armando López-Torres, 73, Peruvian Olympic sports shooter (1956, 1964).
- Bitsy Mott, 82, American baseball player (Philadelphia Phillies).
- Sigurd Raschèr, 93, German-American saxophonist.
- John J. Tammaro Jr., 75, American thoroughbred racehorse trainer, drowning.
- L. R. Wright, 61, Canadian writer and novelist, breast cancer.

=== 26 ===
- Dragoslav Avramović, 81, Serbian economist.
- Georg Brauer, 92, German chemist.
- Leif Haugen, 83, Norwegian Olympic cross-country skier (1948).
- Frances Lincoln, 55, English independent publisher, pneumonia.
- Dee Mackey, 66, American gridiron football player (San Francisco 49ers, Baltimore Colts, New York Jets), heart attack.
- Duke Nalon, 87, American racing driver.
- Paul Donnelly Paganucci, 69, American investment banker.
- Arturo Uslar Pietri, 94, Venezuelan writer, television producer and politician, heart attack.
- Yaakov Rechter, 76, Israeli architect.
- Jean-Louis Ricci, 57, French racing driver.
- Jale İnan, 87, Turkish archaeologist.

=== 27 ===
- Milton Barnes, 69, Canadian composer, conductor, and jazz drummer, heart attack.
- Ralf D. Bode, 59, German-American cinematographer (Coal Miner's Daughter, Saturday Night Fever, Uncle Buck), lung cancer.
- Louis Bordo, 80, American gymnast and Olympian (1948), kidney failure.
- José García Nieto, 86, Spanish poet and writer.
- Doyle Schick, 62, American gridiron football player (Washington Redskins).
- Selwyn Toogood, 84, New Zealand radio and television personality.

=== 28 ===
- Stan Cullis, 84, British footballer and manager.
- Gildas Molgat, 74, Canadian politician, stroke.
- Raúl Planas, 80, Cuban singer and songwriter.
- Charles Pozzi, 91, French racing driver.
- K Sankunni, Indian film editor.
- Damon Tassos, 77, American football player (Detroit Lions, Green Bay Packers).
