= 3000 metres steeplechase world record progression =

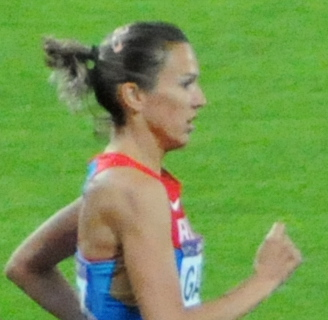
Former women's record holder Gulnara Samitova-Galkina improved the mark three times.

The official world records in the 3000 metres steeplechase are held by Lamecha Girma of Ethiopia at 7:52.11 minutes for men and Beatrice Chepkoech of Kenya at 8:44.32 for women.

Although the event had been run for decades and was first contested at the 1920 Olympics, the event was not standardized until 1954, with a requirement for athletes to jump a total of 28 barriers of height 91.1 cm to 91.7 cm, and width 3.66 m (4 hurdle barriers per lap), and jump seven water barriers 3.66 m long and wide with a 91 cm hurdle (1 water barrier per lap). The first 3000 m steeplechase world record to be ratified by the International Association of Athletics Federations (IAAF) was a run of 8:49.6 minutes by Hungarian Sándor Rozsnyói in 1954.

Before standardization, Sweden's Josef Ternström was the first to complete the event in under ten minutes with his time of 9:49.8 minutes in 1914. When he did it, one of the barriers included a stone wall, and the 500-metre course was a figure-eight. Another Swede, Erik Elmsäter, was the first to dip under nine minutes, in 1944. The first person to run the steeplechase in under eight minutes was Moses Kiptanui of Kenya, who ran it in 7:59.18 on 16 August 1995, in Zürich, Switzerland.

The women's 3000 m steeplechase was recognized as an official world record event as of January 1, 2000, recognizing Yelena Motalova's time of 9:48.88 from 1999 as the inaugural record. It was first contested at a World Championships in Athletics in 2005 and made its Olympic debut in 2008. The first sub-10 minute steeplechase was achieved by Romania's Daniela Petrescu in 1998 with a time of 9:55.28 minutes, but this was before the event was recognized by the IAAF. The first sub-nine minute steeplechase for women was by Gulnara Galkina of Russia in 2008 with a clocking of 8:58.81.

On 16 August 2002, Brahim Boulami of Morocco ran 7:53.17 but the performance was not ratified as a record as Boulami tested positive for EPO, a banned substance.

== Men ==
Ratified
Not ratified
Ratified but later rescinded
Pending ratification

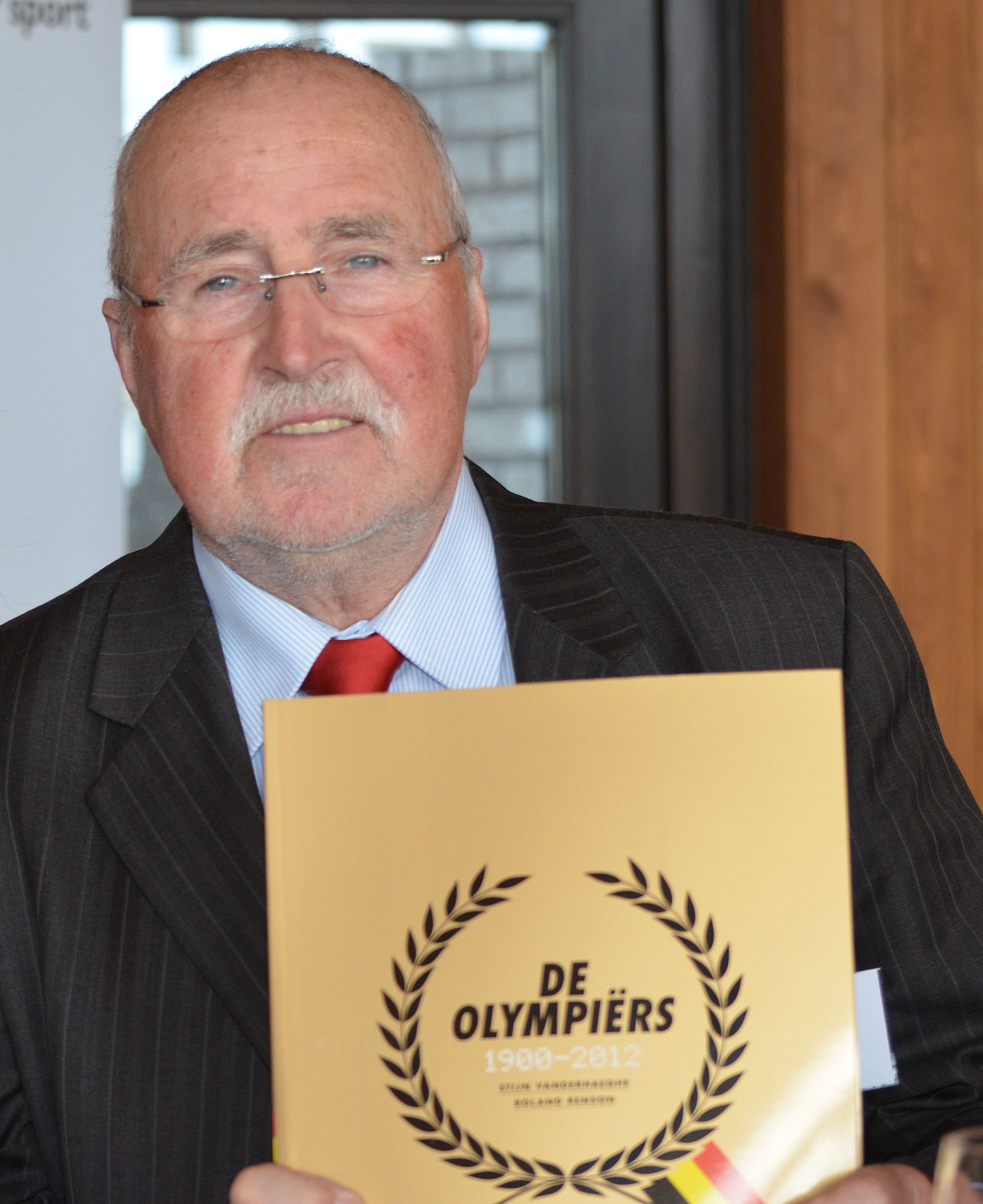
Belgium's Gaston Roelants broke the world record the year before and the year after his steeplechase gold medal at the 1964 Summer Olympics.

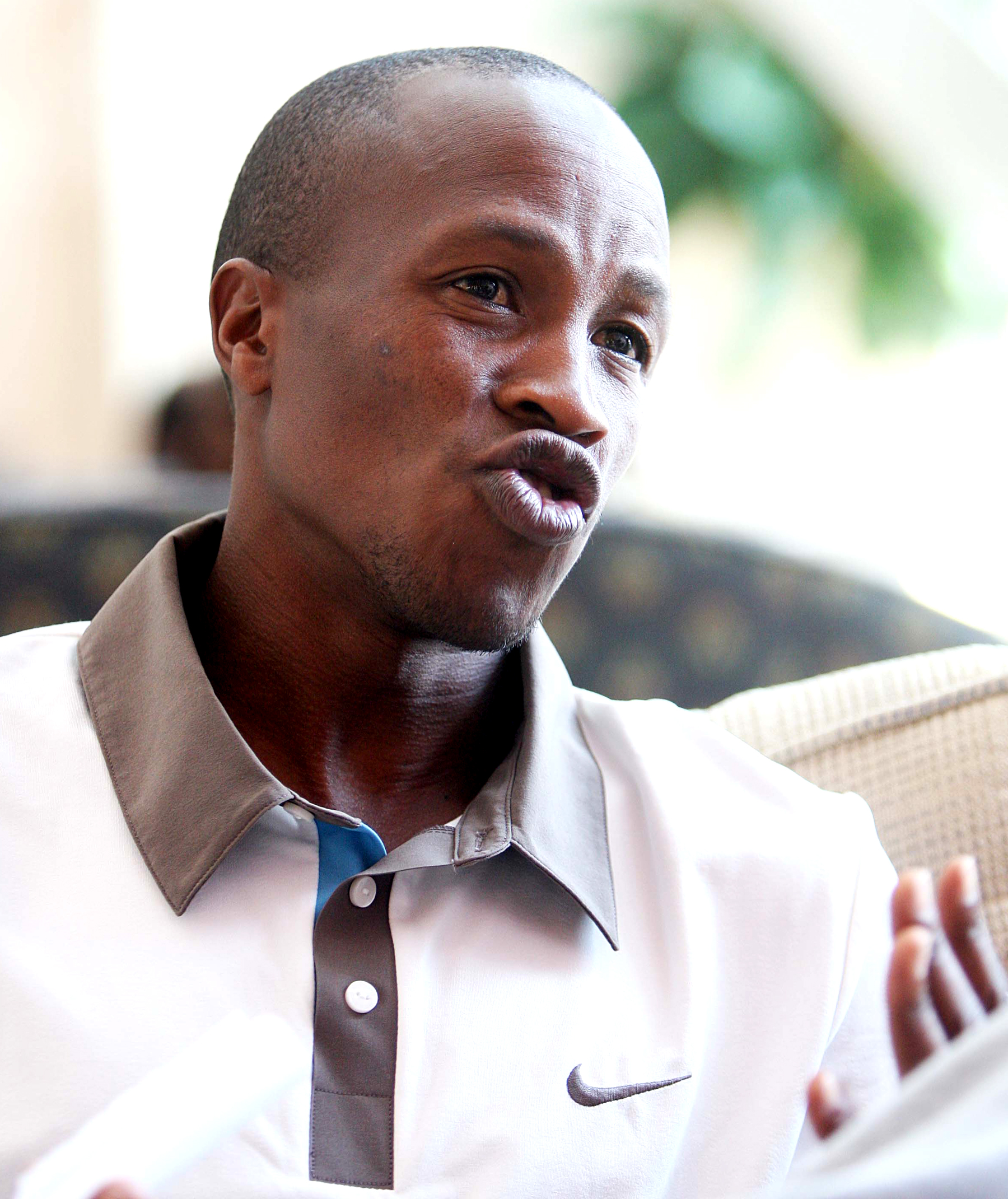
Until 2023, Saif Saaeed Shaheen was the record holder.

Time	Auto	Athlete	Location	Date
9.49.8		Josef Ternström (SWE)	Malmö	1914-07-04
9.36.0 NWJ		Ernesto Ambrosini (ITA)	Paris	1923-06-09
9.33.4 NWJ		Paul Bontemps (FRA)	Paris	1924-06-09
9.31.2 NWJ		Félix Roman (FRA)	Marseille	1925-06-07
9.25.2		Toivo Loukola (FIN)	Helsinki	1928-07-09
9.21.8		Toivo Loukola (FIN)	Amsterdam	1928-08-04
9.14.5		Joseph McCluskey (USA)	Stanford	1932-07-16
9.09.4		Volmari Iso-Hollo (FIN)	Lahti	1933-05-28
9.08.2		Harold Manning (USA)	New York City	1936-07-12
9.03.8		Volmari Iso-Hollo (FIN)	Berlin	1936-08-08
9.03.4		Erik Elmsäter (SWE)	Ostersund	1943-08-22
8.59.6		Erik Elmsäter (SWE)	Stockholm	1944-08-04
8.49.8		Vladimir Kazantsev (URS)	Moscow	1951-07-10
8.48.6		Vladimir Kazantsev (URS)	Kiev	1952-06-12
8.45.4		Horace Ashenfelter (USA)	Helsinki	1952-07-25
8.44.4		Olavi Rinteenpää (FIN)	Helsinki	1953-07-02
8:49.6		Sándor Rozsnyói (HUN)	Bern	1954-08-28
8:47.8		Pentti Karvonen (FIN)	Helsinki	1955-07-01
8:45.4		Pentti Karvonen (FIN)	Oslo	1955-07-15
8:45.4		Vasiliy Vlasenko (URS)	Moscow	1955-08-18
8:41.2		Jerzy Chromik (POL)	Brno	1955-08-31
8:40.2		Jerzy Chromik (POL)	Budapest	1955-09-11
8:39.8		Semyon Rzhishchin (URS)	Moscow	1956-08-14
8:35.6		Sándor Rozsnyói (HUN)	Budapest	1956-09-16
8:35.6		Semyon Rzhishchin (URS)	Tallinn	1958-07-21
8:32.0		Jerzy Chromik (POL)	Warsaw	1958-08-02
8:31.4		Zdzisław Krzyszkowiak (POL)	Tula	1960-06-26
8:31.2		Grigoriy Taran (URS)	Kiev	1961-05-28
8:30.4		Zdzisław Krzyszkowiak (POL)	Wałcz	1961-08-10
8:29.6		Gaston Roelants (BEL)	Leuven	1963-09-07
8:26.4		Gaston Roelants (BEL)	Leuven	1965-08-07
8:24.2		Jouko Kuha (FIN)	Stockholm	1968-07-17
8:22.2		Vladimir Dudin (URS)	Kiev	1969-08-19
8:22.0	8:21.98	Kerry O'Brien (AUS)	Berlin	1970-07-04
8:20.8		Anders Gärderud (SWE)	Helsinki	1972-09-14
8:20.8		Ben Jipcho (KEN)	Lagos	1973-01-15
8:19.8		Ben Jipcho (KEN)	Helsinki	1973-06-19
8:14.0	8:13.91	Ben Jipcho (KEN)	Helsinki	1973-06-27
8:10.4		Anders Gärderud (SWE)	Oslo	1975-06-25
8:09.8	8:09.70	Anders Gärderud (SWE)	Stockholm	1975-07-01
8:08.0	8:08.02	Anders Gärderud (SWE)	Montreal	1976-07-28
8:05.4		Henry Rono (KEN)	Seattle	1978-05-13
8:05.35		Peter Koech (KEN)	Stockholm	1989-07-03
8:02.08		Moses Kiptanui (KEN)	Zürich	1992-08-19
7:59.18		Moses Kiptanui (KEN)	Zürich	1995-08-16
7:59.08		Wilson Boit Kipketer (KEN)	Zürich	1997-08-13
7:55.72		Bernard Barmasai (KEN)	Cologne	1997-08-24
7:55.28		Brahim Boulami (MAR)	Brussels	2001-08-24
7:53.63		Saif Saaeed Shaheen (QAT)^{[nb]}	Brussels	2004-09-03
7:52.11		Lamecha Girma (ETH)	Paris	2023-06-09

Auto times to the hundredth of a second were accepted by the IAAF for events up to and including 10,000 m from 1981.

- ^{nb} Until 2002 Saif Saaeed Shaheen was known as Stephen Cherono, and represented Kenya.

== Women ==
=== Pre-IAAF recognition ===
Time	Athlete	Location	Date
10:34.5	Sarah Heeb (USA)	Walnut	1996-04-20
10:30.2	Grace Padilla (USA)	Los Angeles	1996-05-17
10:23.47	Courtney Meldrum (USA)	Atlanta	1996-06-23
10:19.6	Karen Harvey (CAN)	Walnut	1998-04-18
9:55.28	Daniela Petrescu (ROM)	Bucharest	1998-06-21
9:48.88	Yelena Motalova (RUS)	Tula	1999-07-31
9:43.64	Cristina Casandra (ROM)	Bucharest	2000-08-07
9:40.20	Cristina Casandra (ROM)	Reims	2000-08-30

=== IAAF ratified ===
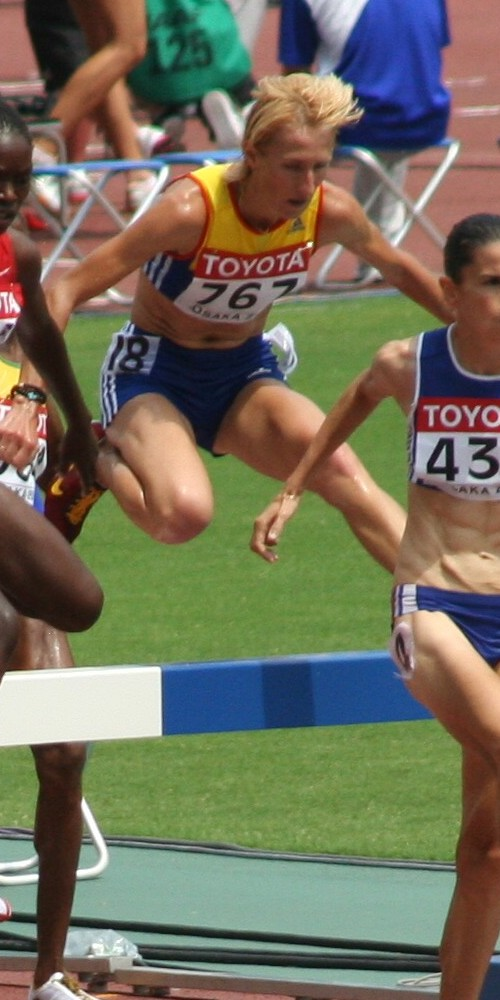
Romania's Cristina Casandra set two world records in the event.

Time	Athlete	Location	Date
9:48.88	Yelena Motalova (RUS)	Tula	1999-07-31
9:43.64	Cristina Casandra (ROM)	Bucharest	2000-08-07
9:40.20	Cristina Casandra (ROM)	Reims	2000-08-30
9:25.31	Justyna Bąk (POL)	Nice	2001-07-09
9:22.29	Justyna Bąk (POL)	Milan	2002-06-05
9:21.72	Alesya Turova (BLR)	Ostrava	2002-06-12
9:16.51	Alesya Turova (BLR)	Gdańsk	2002-07-27
9:08.33	Gulnara Samitova (RUS)	Tula	2003-08-10
9:01.59	Gulnara Samitova (RUS)	Iraklio	2004-07-04
8:58.81	Gulnara Samitova-Galkina (RUS)	Beijing	2008-08-17
8:52.78	Ruth Jebet (BHR)	Paris	2016-08-27
8:44.32	Beatrice Chepkoech (KEN)	Monaco	2018-07-20
