= 1954 European Athletics Championships – Men's 3000 metres steeplechase =

Men's 3000 metres steeplechase at the European Athletics Championships

The men's 3000 metres steeplechase at the 1954 European Athletics Championships was held in Bern, Switzerland, at Stadion Neufeld on 26 and 28 August 1954.

== Medalists ==
Gold	Sándor Rozsnyói; Hungary
Silver	Olavi Rinteenpää; Finland
Bronze	Ernst Larsen; Norway

== Results ==
=== Final ===
28 August

Rank	Name	Nationality	Time	Notes
1st place, gold medalist(s)	Sándor Rozsnyói	Hungary	8:49.6	CR NR
2nd place, silver medalist(s)	Olavi Rinteenpää	Finland	8:52.4	
3rd place, bronze medalist(s)	Ernst Larsen	Norway	8:53.2	NR
4	Pentti Karvonen	Finland	8:55.2	
5	László Jeszenszky	Hungary	8:59.4	
6	Viktor Kurchavov	Soviet Union	9:00.2	
7	Vlastimil Brlica	Czechoslovakia	9:03.6	NR
8	Yevgeniy Kodyaykin	Soviet Union	9:07.4	
9	Helmut Thumm	West Germany	9:07.6	
10	John Disley	Great Britain	9:07.6	
11	Karl-Heinz Schmalz	West Germany	9:15.6	
	Jerzy Chromik	Poland	DNS	

=== Heats ===
26 August

==== Heat 1 ====
Rank	Name	Nationality	Time	Notes
1	Ernst Larsen	Norway	9:00.0	CR Q
2	Sándor Rozsnyói	Hungary	9:01.0	Q
3	Pentti Karvonen	Finland	9:01.2	Q
4	Karl-Heinz Schmalz	West Germany	9:01.8	Q
5	Yevgeniy Kodyaykin	Soviet Union	9:02.2	Q
6	Vlastimil Brlica	Czechoslovakia	9:05.6	NR Q
7	Curt Söderberg	Sweden	9:12.8	
8	Kenneth Johnson	Great Britain	9:17.6	
9	Roger Deweer	Belgium	9:30.2	
10	Grigore Cojocaru	Romania	9:31.6	
11	Gottfried Stäubli	Switzerland	9:32.0	

==== Heat 2 ====
Rank	Name	Nationality	Time	Notes
1	Viktor Kurchavov	Soviet Union	9:06.2	Q
2	László Jeszenszky	Hungary	9:06.2	Q
3	Jerzy Chromik	Poland	9:06.4	Q
4	Olavi Rinteenpää	Finland	9:06.8	Q
5	John Disley	Great Britain	9:13.6	Q
6	Helmut Thumm	West Germany	9:14.4	Q
7	Abdullah Kökpinar	Turkey	9:32.8	
8	Gunnar Tjörnebo	Sweden	9:36.2	
9	Arthur Huber	Switzerland	9:45.4	
10	Augusto Silva	Portugal	9:56.4	

== Participation ==
According to an unofficial count, 21 athletes from 14 countries participated in the event.

- Belgium (1)
- Czechoslovakia (1)
- Finland (2)
- Hungary (2)
- Norway (1)
- Poland (1)
- Portugal (1)
- Romania (1)
- Soviet Union (2)
- Sweden (2)
- Switzerland (2)
- Turkey (1)
- Great Britain (2)
- West Germany (2)
