= Athletics at the 1952 Summer Olympics – Men's 3000 metres steeplechase =

Men's 3000 metres steeplechase at the Games of the XV Olympiad
- Venue: Olympic Stadium, Helsinki
- Dates: July 23, 1952 (heats); July 25, 1952 (final)
- Competitors: 35 from 19 nations
- Winning time: 8:45.4 WR

Medalists
1st place, gold medalist(s)		Horace Ashenfelter; United States
2nd place, silver medalist(s)		Vladimir Kazantsev; Soviet Union
3rd place, bronze medalist(s)		John Disley; Great Britain

The men's 3000 metres steeplechase event at the 1952 Summer Olympic Games took place July 23 and July 25. The final was won by American Horace Ashenfelter.

== Results ==
=== Heats ===
The first round was held on July 23. The four fastest runners from each heat qualified to the final.

Heat 1

Rank	Name	Nationality	Result	Notes
1	Vladimir Kazantsev	Soviet Union	8:58.0	OR
2	Günter Heßelmann	Germany	9:05.0	
3	Gunnar Tjörnebo	Sweden	9:05.4	
4	Cahit Önel	Turkey	9:06.0	
5	Jindřich Roudný	Czechoslovakia	9:06.4	
6	Kauko Lusenius	Finland	9:26.8	
7	Kenneth Johnson	Great Britain	9:27.0	
8	Drago Štritof	Yugoslavia	9:28.0	
9	Victor Firea	Romania	9:29.2	
10	Guillermo Solá	Chile	9:32.2	
11	Pierre Prat	France	9:32.8	
12	Gulzara Singh Mann	India	9:48.6	
–	Bill Ashenfelter	United States	DNF	

Heat 2

Rank	Name	Nationality	Result	Notes
1	John Disley	Great Britain	8:59.4	
2	Olavi Rinteenpää	Finland	8:59.4	
3	József Apró	Hungary	9:00.4	
4	Helmut Gude	Germany	9:04.2	
5	Fyodor Marulin	Soviet Union	9:08.4	
6	Ali Baghbanbashi	Iran	9:13.2	
7	Jan Kielas	Poland	9:15.4	
8	André Lebrun	France	9:17.8	
9	Susumu Takahashi	Japan	9:21.6	
10	Božidar Đurašković	Yugoslavia	9:23.2	
11	Eric Nilsson	Sweden	9:25.0	
12	Browning Ross	United States	9:44.0	
–	Augusto Robles	Guatemala	DNS	

Heat 3

Rank	Name	Nationality	Result	Notes
1	Horace Ashenfelter	United States	8:51.0	OR
2	Mikhail Saltykov	Soviet Union	8:55.8	
3	Curt Söderberg	Sweden	9:02.4	
4	Chris Brasher	Great Britain	9:03.2	
5	Urho Julin	Finland	9:09.4	
6	László Jeszenszky	Hungary	9:11.2	
7	André Paris	France	9:30.0	
8	Robert Schoonjans	Belgium	9:30.6	
9	Petar Šegedin	Yugoslavia	9:40.2	
–	Víctorio Solares	Guatemala	DNF	
–	Vasilis Mavrapostolos	Greece	DNS	
–	Martin Stokken	Norway	DNS	
–	Osman Coşgül	Turkey	DNS	

=== Final ===
Rank	Name	Nationality	Time (hand)	Notes
1st place, gold medalist(s)	Horace Ashenfelter	United States	8:45.4	WR
2nd place, silver medalist(s)	Vladimir Kazantsev	Soviet Union	8:51.6	
3rd place, bronze medalist(s)	John Disley	Great Britain	8:51.8	
4	Olavi Rinteenpää	Finland	8:55.2	
5	Curt Söderberg	Sweden	8:55.6	
6	Günter Hesselmann	Germany	8:55.8	
7	Mikhail Saltykov	Soviet Union	8:56.2	
8	Helmut Gude	Germany	9:01.4	
9	József Apró	Hungary	9:04.2	
10	Cahit Önel	Turkey	9:04.4	
11	Chris Brasher	Great Britain	9:14.0	
12	Gunnar Tjörnebo	Sweden	10:26.4	

Key: WR = World record
