= 1950 European Athletics Championships – Men's 3000 metres steeplechase =

Men's 3000 metres steeplechase at the European Athletics Championships

The men's 3000 metres steeplechase at the 1950 European Athletics Championships was held in Brussels, Belgium, at Heysel Stadium on 27 August 1950.

== Medalists ==
| Gold | Jindřich Roudný; Czechoslovakia |
| Silver | Petar Šegedin; Yugoslavia |
| Bronze | Erik Blomster; Finland |

== Results ==
=== Final ===
27 August

| Rank | Name | Nationality | Time | Notes |
|---|---|---|---|---|
| 1st place, gold medalist(s) | Jindřich Roudný | Czechoslovakia | 9:05.4 | |
| 2nd place, silver medalist(s) | Petar Šegedin | Yugoslavia | 9:07.4 | |
| 3rd place, bronze medalist(s) | Erik Blomster | Finland | 9:08.8 | |
| 4 | Martin Stokken | Norway | 9:13.0 | |
| 5 | Alexandre Guyodo | France | 9:17.4 | |
| 6 | Robert Schoonjans | Belgium | 9:18.6 | |
| 7 | Curt Söderberg | Sweden | 9:21.0 | |
| 8 | Tore Sjöstrand | Sweden | 9:25.2 | |
| 9 | Cahit Önel | Turkey | 9:26.4 | |
| 10 | Urho Julin | Finland | 9:27.4 | |
| 11 | André Lebrun | France | 9:29.8 | |
| 12 | Robert Everaert | Belgium | 9:34.4 | |
| 13 | John Disley | Great Britain | NT | |
| 14 | Drago Štritof | Yugoslavia | NT | |
| 15 | Dimitrios Melidonis | Greece | NT | |
| 16 | Paul Frieden | Luxembourg | NT | |

== Participation ==
According to an unofficial count, 16 athletes from 11 countries participated in the event.

- Belgium (2)
- Czechoslovakia (1)
- Finland (2)
- France (2)
- Greece (1)
- Luxembourg (1)
- Norway (1)
- Sweden (2)
- Turkey (1)
- Great Britain (1)
- Yugoslavia (2)
