= Athletics at the 1956 Summer Olympics – Men's 3000 metres steeplechase =

Men's 3000 metres steeplechase at the Games of the XVI Olympiad
- Venue: Melbourne Cricket Ground
- Dates: 27 November 1956 (heats); 29 November 1956 (final)
- Competitors: 23 from 13 nations
- Winning time: 8:41.2 OR

Medalists
1st place, gold medalist(s)		Chris Brasher; Great Britain
2nd place, silver medalist(s)		Sándor Rozsnyói; Hungary
3rd place, bronze medalist(s)		Ernst Larsen; Norway

The men's 3000 metres steeplechase was an event at the 1956 Summer Olympics in Melbourne, Australia. There were a total number of 23 participants.

== Results ==
=== Heats ===
Rank	Heat	Name	Nationality	Time (hand)	Time (automatic)	Notes
1	1	Sándor Rozsnyói	Hungary	8:46.6	8:46.89	Q
2	1	John Disley	Great Britain	8:46.6	8:46.93	Q
3	1	Ernst Larsen	Norway	8:46.8	8:46.96	Q
4	1	Deacon Jones	United States	8:47.4	8:47.57	Q
5	1	Zdzisław Krzyszkowiak	Poland	8:48.0	8:48.29	Q
6	1	Horace Ashenfelter	United States	8:51.0	8:51.12	
7	2	Eric Shirley	Great Britain	8:52.6	8:52.72	Q
8	2	Semyon Rzshishchin	Soviet Union	8:53.0	8:53.18	Q
9	2	Heinz Laufer	United Team of Germany	8:53.0	8:53.23	Q
10	2	Chris Brasher	Great Britain	8:53.8	8:54.19	Q
11	1	Vasily Vlasenko	Soviet Union	8:55.0	8:54.99	
12	2	Neil Robbins	Australia	8:55.4	8:55.62	Q
13	1	Georgios Papavassiliou	Greece	8:55.6	8:55.93	
14	2	Gunnar Tjörnebo	Sweden	9:02.0	9:02.13	
15	2	Ilkka Auer	Finland	9:04.0	9:04.57	
16	2	László Jeszenszky	Hungary	9:04.2	9:04.99	
17	1	Yevgeny Kadyaykin	Soviet Union	9:09.6	–	
18	1	Graham Thomas	Australia	9:09.8	–	
19	1	Olavi Rinteenpää	Finland	9:10.0	–	
19	2	Phil Coleman	Hungary	9:10.0	–	
20	2	Ron Blackney	Australia	9:16.0	–	
	1	Frans Herman	Belgium	DNF	–	
	2	Eduardo Fontecilla	Chile	DNF	–	
	2	Jerzy Chromik	Poland	DNS	–	

=== Final ===
Rank	Name	Nationality	Time (hand)	Time (automatic)	Notes
1st place, gold medalist(s)	Chris Brasher	Great Britain	8:41.2	8:41.35	OR
2nd place, silver medalist(s)	Sándor Rozsnyói	Hungary	8:43.6	8:43.68	
3rd place, bronze medalist(s)	Ernst Larsen	Norway	8:44.0	8:44.05	
4	Heinz Laufer	United Team of Germany	8:44.4	8:44.53	
5	Semyon Rzshishchin	Soviet Union	8:44.6	8:44.58	
6	John Disley	Great Britain	8:44.6	8:44.79	
7	Neil Robbins	Australia	8:50.0	8:50.36	
8	Eric Shirley	Great Britain	8:57.0	–	
9	Deacon Jones	United States	9:13.0	–	
	Zdzisław Krzyszkowiak	Poland	DNS	–	
