= Mt. SAC Relays =

Annual track meet in Walnut, California

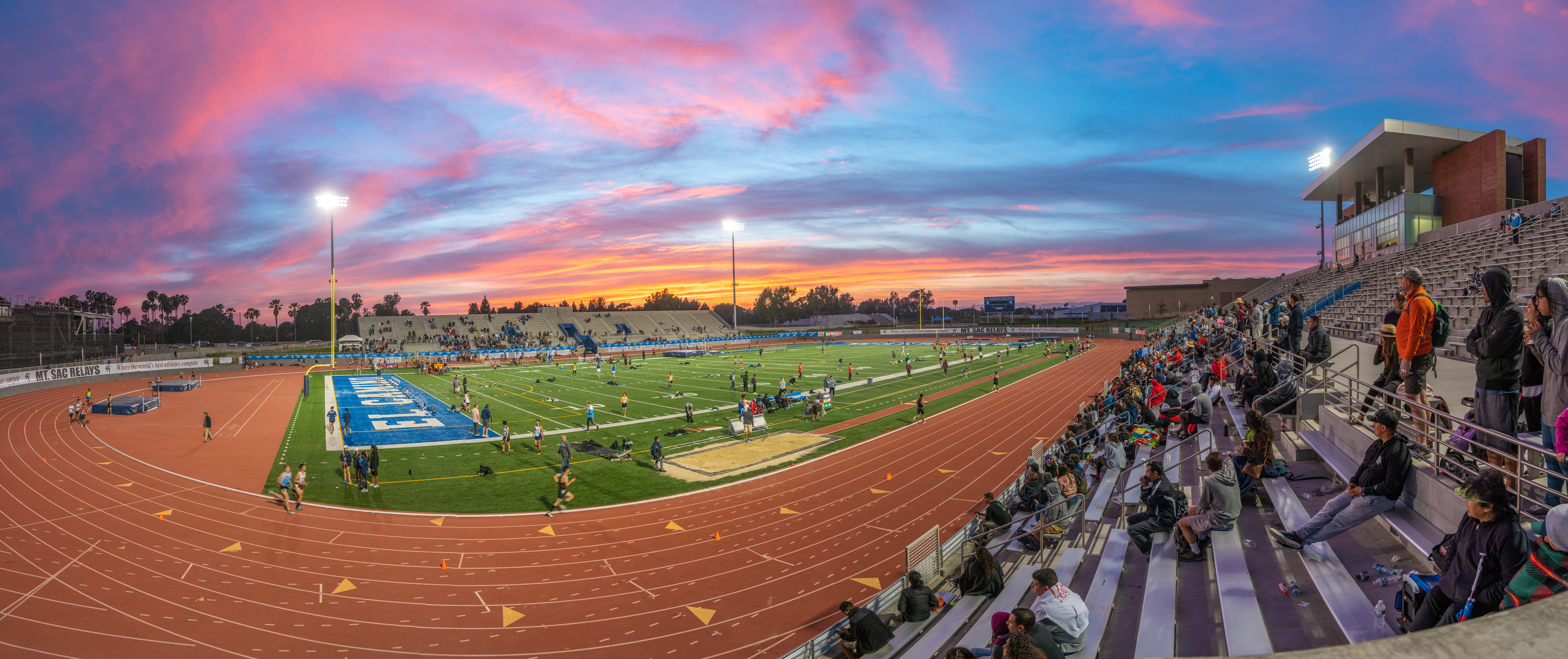
Relays track event in 2018

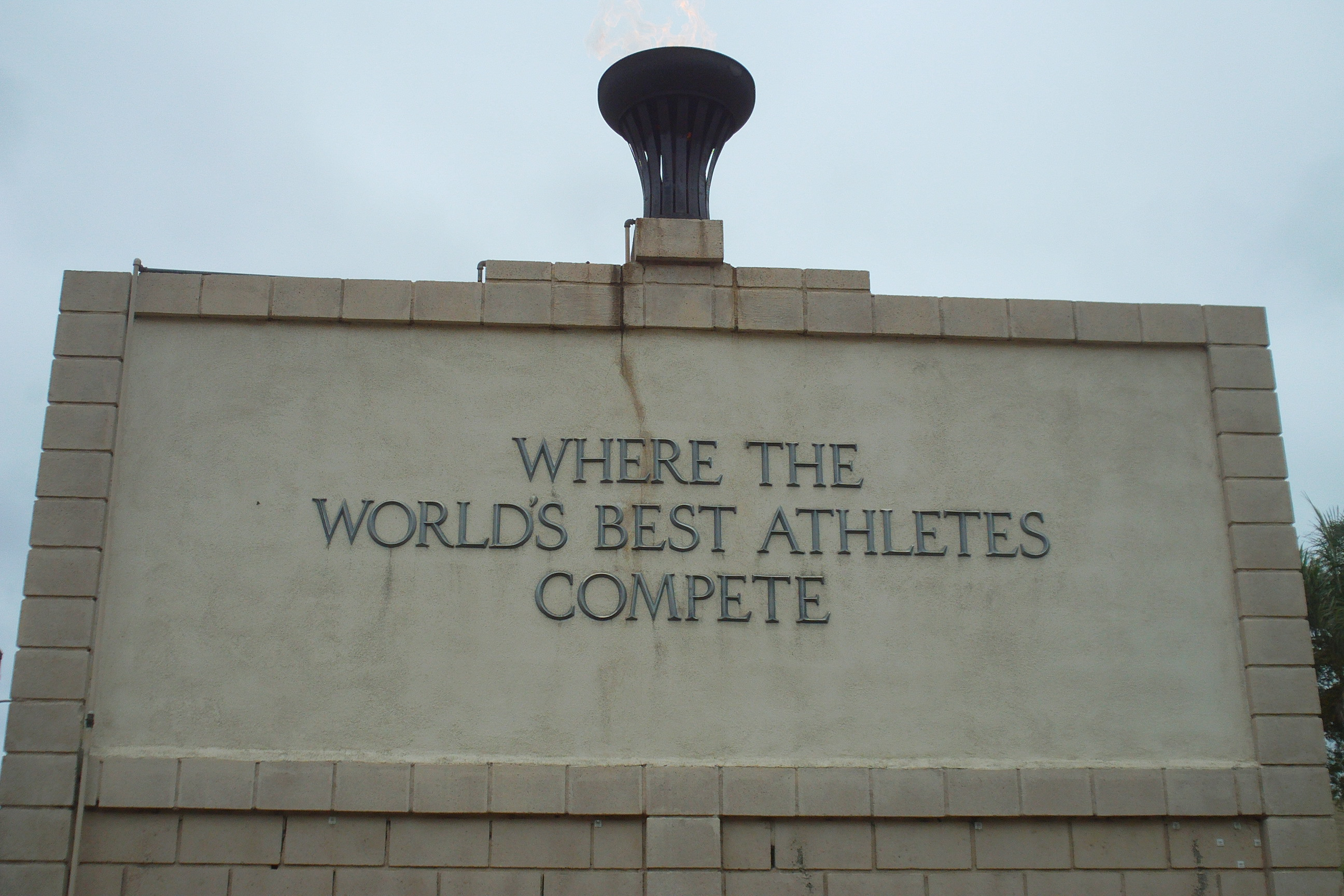
Olympic Flame and wall of honor at Hilmer Lodge Stadium

The Mt. SAC Relays are an annual track and field festival held primarily at Hilmer Lodge Stadium on the Mt. San Antonio College campus in Walnut, California. The Relays are held in mid-April each year since the first edition held on April 24–25, 1959. The meet was started by Mt. San Antonio College track coach Hilmer Lodge, and flourished under his direction until his retirement in 1963. The meet attracts all levels and disciplines of the sport of Track and Field. They claim to have had as many as 9,000 competitors participate in a single year. Because of the stature of the meet, the stadium and most meet literature contains the phrase "Where the world's best athletes compete".

== Divisions ==
While the relays are most famous for the elite division, where many notable athletes have used this event as an early season test of their fitness (before the championships that start in late May and June), there are races for small children from the community, Youth teams, and Masters athletes. A full day is largely devoted to High School events, attracting the top Southern California talent as well as others from out of town. International High School athletes from as far away as Australia and New Zealand have competed here, Mexico is represented regularly. There is a "Distance Carnival" which provides a rare (American) opportunity to run in a highly competitive track 10,000 metres race. The meet is a popular gathering for many elite throwers. Seven world records in throwing events alone, including four in the Discus have been set at the Mt. SAC Relays. A full multiple event competition associated with the meet (Decathlon for men and now Heptathlon for women) is held at Azusa Pacific University. Racewalking events are held earlier in the month, with occasional elite races held on the day of the elite competition. And with this meet being held at a Community College, there is a full competition for that level. While the relays started in 1959, the first women weren't allowed to participate until 1961, with one race, a 440-yard dash, out of a 113 event schedule.

Past Directors of the Mt. SAC Relays include Hilmer Lodge, Don Ruh, John Norton, Scott Davis, Doug Todd and current director, Brian Yokoyama.

Due to construction of a new Hilmer Lodge Stadium at Mt. San Antonio College, the 2016 edition was held at Cerritos College in Norwalk and the 2017 and 2018 editions were held at El Camino College in Torrance.

== Records ==
Over the course of its history, numerous national records in athletics and world records have been set at the Mt. SAC Relays including the world record in the 4×200m relay that lasted over 20 years (1994–2015).

=== World records ===
World records set at the Mt. SAC Relays
Year	Event	Record	Athlete	Nationality
1960	Long jump	8.21 m (±0.0 m/s)	Ralph Boston	United States
1960	Shot put	20.06 m	Bill Nieder	United States
1960	Discus throw	59.91 m	Rink Babka	United States
1962	Pole vault	4.93 m	Dave Tork	United States
1963	Discus throw	62.62 m	Al Oerter	United States
1963	Decathlon	9,121 pts	C.K. Yang	Republic of China
1964	Discus throw	62.94 m	Al Oerter	United States
1976	Discus throw	69.18 m	Mac Wilkins	United States
1981	Heptathlon	6,166 pts	Jane Frederick	United States
1994	4 × 200 m relay	1:18.68	Santa Monica Track Club: Michael Marsh, Leroy Burrell, Floyd Heard, Carl Lewis	United States
1996	3000 m steeplechase	10:34.5	Sara Heeb	United States
1998	3000 m steeplechase	10:19.6	Karen Harvey	Canada

== Meet records ==
=== Men ===
Men's meeting records of the Mt. SAC Relays
Event	Record	Athlete	Nationality	Date	Ref.
100 m	9.86 (+1.8 m/s)	Ato Boldon	Trinidad and Tobago	19 April 1998	
200 m	19.80 (+1.6 m/s)	Fred Kerley	United States	16 April 2022	
400 m	43.45	Michael Norman	United States	20 April 2019	
600 m	1:15.44	Duane Solomon	United States	18 April 2015	
800 m	1:43.60	Clayton Murphy	United States	15 April 2017	
1500 m	3:35.70	Russell Wolf Brown	United States	15 April 2011	
Mile	3:52.21	Jamel Ahrass	France	20 April 2012	
3000 m	7:47.8	Eamonn Martin	United Kingdom	April 1984	
5000 m	13:11.37	Juan Barrios	Mexico	13 April 2007	
10,000 m	27:36.2	Gabriel Kamau	Kenya	April 1982	
110 m hurdles	13.22 (+1.4 m/s)	Larry Wade	United States	18 April 1999	
400 m hurdles	47.74	Rai Benjamin	United States	15 April 2023	
3000 m steeplechase	8:26.14	Evan Jager	United States	19 April 2012	
High jump	2.35 m (7 ft 8 1/2 in)	Guowei Zhang	China	18 April 2015	
Pole vault	5.82 m (19 ft 1 in)	Giovanni Lanaro	Mexico	15 April 2007	
Long jump	8.66 m (28 ft 4 3/4 in)	Carl Lewis	United States	April 1987	
Triple jump	17.63 m (57 ft 10 in)	Kenta Bell	United States	26 April 2002	
Shot put	22.52 m (73 ft 10 1/2 in)	John Brenner	United States	April 1987	
Discus throw	69.36 m (227 ft 6 1/2 in)	Ben Plucknett	United States	April 1983	
Hammer throw	80.88 m (265 ft 4 1/4 in)	Jud Logan	United States	April 1986	
Javelin throw	87.65 m (287 ft 6 3/4 in)	Breaux Greer	United States	17 April 2005	
Decathlon	8732 pts	Ayden Owens-Delerme	Puerto Rico	17–18 April 2024	
Decathlon	100m / Long jump / Shot put / High jump / 400m / 110m H / Discus / Pole vault / Javelin / 1500m; 10.31 (+1.9 m/s) / 7.77 m (+2.6 m/s) / 16.26 m / 1.98 m / 47.23 / 13.73 (+0.9 m/s) / 46.00 m / 5.10 m / 59.28 m / 4:45.59				
1 Mile walk	5:54.52	Curt Clausen	United States	23 April 2001	
5000 m walk	23:27.06	Ryan Allen	United States	14 April 2023	
20,000 m walk	1:23:00.55	Ever Palma	Mexico	14 April 2023	
4 × 100 m relay	37.79	Santa Monica Track Club	United States	April 1994	
4 × 200 m relay	1:18.68	Santa Monica Track Club	United States	April 1994	
4 × 400 m relay	3:00.48	Mazda Track Club	United States	April 1992	
4 × 800 m relay	7:06.5	Santa Monica Track Club	United States	April 1986	
Sprint medley relay	3:12.2	Santa Monica Track Club	United States	April 1984	
Distance medley relay	9:29.3	Santa Monica Track Club	United States	April 1983	
4 × 110m hurdles shuttle relay	55.25	Jim Tatham; Phil Johnson; Milan Stewart; Tonie Campbell	United States	26 April 1981	

=== Women ===
Women's meeting records of the Mt. SAC Relays
Event	Record	Athlete	Nationality	Date	Ref.
100 m	10.87	Merlene Ottey	Jamaica	1987	
200 m	22.02 (+1.9 m/s)	Gabby Thomas	United States	16 April 2022	
300 m	36.61	Kelli White	United States	April 2000	
400 m	49.59	Marion Jones	United States	16 April 2000	
800 m	1:58.77	Raevyn Rogers	United States	16 April 2022	
1500 m	4:04.86	Brenda Martinez	United States	19 April 2013	
Mile	4:31.72	Sadie Engelhardt	United States	19 April 2024	
3000 m	8:50.07	PattiSue Plumer	United States	April 1992	
5000 m	14:44.80	Shalane Flanagan	United States	13 April 2007	
10,000 m	31:23.35	Sabrina Mockenhaupt	Germany	17 April 2004	
100 m hurdles	12.43 (+1.5 m/s)	Brianna Rollins-McNeal	United States	21 April 2018	
400 m hurdles	54.39	Andrenette Knight	Jamaica	15 April 2022	
3000 m steeplechase	9:39.94	Korene Hinds	Jamaica	13 April 2007	
High jump	2.00 m (6 ft 6 1/2 in)	Tisha Waller	United States	19 April 1999	
High jump	2.00 m (6 ft 6 1/2 in)	Chaunte Howard	United States	15 April 2006	
Pole vault	4.80 m (15 ft 8 3/4 in)	Hana Moll	United States	18 April 2026	
Long jump	7.12 m (23 ft 4 1/4 in) (−0.9 m/s)	Brittney Reese	United States	21 April 2012	
Triple jump	14.33 m (47 ft 0 in) (+1.6 m/s)	Keturah Orji	United States	21 April 2018	
Shot put	20.13 m (66 ft 1/2 in)	Claudia Losch	Germany	April 1984	
Discus throw	69.46 m (227 ft 10 1/2 in)	Valarie Allman	United States	16 April 2022	
Hammer throw	77.84 m (255 ft 4 1/2 in)	Camryn Rogers	Canada	15 April 2023	
Javelin throw	63.29 m (207 ft 7 1/2 in)	Kara Winger	United States	15 April 2022	
Heptathlon	6910 pts	Jackie Joyner-Kersee	United States	April 1986	
Heptathlon	100m H / High jump / Shot put / 200m / Long jump / Javelin / 800m				
1 Mile walk	6:39.75	Michelle Rohl	United States	23 April 2001	
5000 m walk	24:06.47	Angelica Harris	United States	14 April 2023	
20,000 m walk	1:37:45.71	Miranda Melville	United States	14 April 2023	
4 × 100 m relay	41.79	Team Jet A: Mandy White; Carmelita Jeter; Lauryn Williams; Blessing Okagbare	United States/Nigeria	20 April 2013	
4 × 200 m relay	1:32.44	Speed Dynamics	United States	April 1992	
4 × 400 m relay	3:25.31	Shae Anderson; Jenna Prandini; Brittany Aveni; Kendall Ellis	United States	15 April 2023	
4 × 800 m relay	8:17.09	Athletics West	United States	April 1983	
Sprint medley	1:37.40	Ali Track Club	United States	April 1980	

== High school meet records ==
=== Boys ===
Boy's meeting records of the Mt. SAC Relays
Event	Record	Athlete	School	Date	Ref.
100 m	10.27 (−1.2 m/s)	Michael Norman	Vista Murrieta	16 April 2016	
200 m	20.86 (+1.8 m/s)	Nickolas Miller	Clovis North	15 April 2023	
400 m	46.49	Michael Granville	Bell Gardens	1995	
800 m	1:51.06	Nick Hartle	Centennial	2012	
Mile	4:00.16	Cooper Teare	St. Joseph	14 April 2017	
3200 m	8:54.74	Evert Silva	Fresno	14 April 2017	
110 m hurdles 39"/.99m	13.48 (+1.7 m/s)	Johnathan Cabral	Agoura	2011	
300 m hurdles	36.7 h	Gordon Bugg	West Covina	1983	
300 m hurdles	36.77	Yan Vasquez	Red Mountain	16 April 2022	
High jump	2.21 m (7 ft 3 in)	Jeremy Fischer	Camarillo	1994	
High jump	2.21 m (7 ft 3 in)	Randall Cunningham II	Bishop Gorman	2014	
Pole vault	5.56 m (18 ft 2 3/4 in)	Armand Duplantis (SWE)	Lafayette	15 April 2017	
Long jump	7.64 m (25 ft 3/4 in)	M.T. Lee (TWN)		1979	
Triple jump	15.53 m (50 ft 11 1/4 in)	Ken Williams	Troy	1982	
Shot put 12Lb./5.4 kg.	20.70 m (67 ft 10 3/4 in)	Van Mounts	Bakersfield	1998	
Discus throw	68.30 m (224 ft 3/4 in)	Kamy Keshmiri	Reno	1987	
4 × 100 m relay	40.72		Long Beach Poly	2010	
4 × 200 m relay	1:24.35		Long Beach Poly	1999	
4 × 400 m relay	3:13.71		John Muir	1981	
4 × 800 m relay	7:35.01	Great Oak: Christian Gump, Jacob Brown, Marco Franco, Jack Paradise		18 April 2025	
4 × 1600m relay	16:52.95	Great Oak: I. Cortes, S. Fountain, C. Spencer, S. Dodds		April 2016	
Sprint medley relay 2-2-4-8	3:23.5 h		Compton	1980	
Distance medley relay	9:55.24	Newbury Park: L. Young, Z. Blunt, A. Sahlman, C. Sahlman		16 April 2022	
Shuttle hurdle relay	56.77	Upland: D. Crawford, D. January Jr, D. Davis-Lyric, K.-G. Graves-Blanks		16 April 2022	

=== Girls ===
Girl's meeting records of the Mt. SAC Relays
Event	Record	Athlete	School	Date	Ref.
100 m	11.40	Angela Williams	Chino	1997	
200 m	22.51 (+1.3 m/s) NHSR	Allyson Felix	L.A. Baptist	2003	
400 m	51.99	Shae Anderson	Norco	15 April 2017	
800 m	2:06.89	Cate Peters	Monte Vista	16 April 2022	
Mile	4:31.72 NHSR	Sadie Englehardt	Ventura	19 April 2024	
3200 m	10:08.01	Maddy Denner	Oak Ridge	April 2018	
100 m hurdles	13.24	Brittley Humphrey	Hoover	April 2016	
300 m hurdles	40.97	Ebony Collins	L.B. Wilson	2006	
High jump	1.94 m (6 ft 4 1/4 in) NHSR	Vashti Cunningham	Bishop Gorman	2015	
Pole vault	4.26 m (13 ft 11 1/2 in)	Rachel Baxter	Canyon	April 2017	
Long jump	6.38 m (20 ft 11 in) (+1.8 m/s)	Courtney Corrin	Harvard-Westlake	2013	
Triple jump	12.56 m (41 ft 2 1/4 in)	Ashley Anderson	Carson	2014	
Shot put	15.84 m (51 ft 11 1/2 in)	Stamatia Scarvelis	Dos Pueblos	2014	
Discus throw	52.30 m (171 ft 7 in)	Billie Jo Grant	Arroyo Grande	2002	
4 × 100 m relay	45.22	L.B. Wilson		2006	
4 × 200 m relay	1:36.77	Long Beach Poly		1994	
4 × 400 m relay	3:42.38	Kennedy, Granada Hills: Denean Howard, Tina Howard, Sherri Howard		1981	
4 × 800 m relay	8:59.12	Buchanan: Grace Hutchison, Elle Lomell, Sierra Cornett, Tayler Torosian		14 April 2023	
4 × 1600m relay	19:48.81	Newbury Park: A. Hawkins, T. Sax, M. Nygren, S. McDonnell		16 April 2022	
Sprint medley relay 2-2-4-8	3:53.28	L.B. Wilson		2003	
Distance medley relay	11:21.85	Ventura: Melanie True (3:36.38), Valentina Fakrogha (54.73), Aelo Curtis (2:16.18), Sadie Engelhardt (4:33.95)		20 April 2024	
Shuttle hurdle relay	57.89	Hoover: B. Humphrey, C. Little, K. Horn, M. Nkoudou		2016	
