= Mikhail Saltykov (athlete) =

Belarusian steeplechase runner (1925–1990)

Personal information
- Full name: Mikhail Alekseyevich Saltykov
- Nationality: Belarusian
- Born: 14 November 1925 Minsk, Belarus
- Died: 28 April 1990 (aged 64) Minsk, Belarus

Sport
- Sport: Athletics
- Event: Steeplechase

Mikhail Alekseyevich Saltykov (14 November 1925 – 28 April 1990) was a Belarusian steeplechase runner. He competed in the men's 3000 metres steeplechase at the 1952 Summer Olympics, representing the Soviet Union. Saltykov died in Minsk on 28 April 1990, at the age of 64.
