= Kauko Lusenius =

Finnish middle-distance runner

Personal information
- Full name: Kauko Vilho Lusenius
- Nationality: Finnish
- Born: 29 November 1918
- Died: 5 February 2002 (aged 83)

Sport
- Sport: Middle-distance running
- Event: Steeplechase

Kauko Vilho Lusenius (29 November 1918 – 5 February 2002) was a Finnish middle-distance runner. He competed in the men's 3000 metres steeplechase at the 1952 Summer Olympics.
