= Neil Robbins =

Australian long-distance runner (1929–2020)

Personal information
- Full name: Neil James Robbins
- Nationality: Australian
- Born: 8 September 1929
- Died: 6 December 2020 (aged 91)

Sport
- Sport: athletics
- Events: Steeplechase, long-distance running

Neil James Robbins (8 September 1929 – 6 December 2020) was an Australian steeplechase and long-distance runner. He competed in the six-mile run at the 1954 British Empire and Commonwealth Games and in the 3000 metres steeplechase at the 1956 Summer Olympics.
