= Günter Heßelmann =

German middle-distance runner

Personal information
- Nationality: German
- Born: 3 August 1925
- Died: 12 September 2010 (aged 85)

Sport
- Sport: Middle-distance running
- Event: Steeplechase

Günter Heßelmann (3 August 1925 – 12 September 2010) was a German middle-distance runner. He competed in the men's 3000 metres steeplechase at the 1952 Summer Olympics.

Heßelmann was a four-time world champion and a three time European champion.
