= Yevgeny Kadyaykin =

Soviet middle-distance runner (1928–2021)

Personal information
- Full name: Yevgeny Semyonovich Kadyaykin
- Nationality: Soviet
- Born: 15 August 1928 Penza, Russia
- Died: 5 March 2021 (aged 92)

Sport
- Sport: Middle-distance running
- Event: Steeplechase

Yevgeny Semyonovich Kadyaykin (15 August 1928 – 5 March 2021) was a Soviet middle-distance runner. He competed in the men's 3000 metres steeplechase at the 1956 Summer Olympics.
