= Ernst Larsen =

Norwegian runner (1926–2015)

Medal record

Men's athletics

Representing Norway

Olympic Games
Bronze medal – third place	1956 Melbourne	3000m st.

European Championships
Bronze medal – third place	1954 Bern	3000 m st.

Ernst Willy Larsen (18 July 1926 – 2 December 2015) was a Norwegian athlete, who competed mainly in the 3000 metre steeplechase. He represented Ranheim IL.

Larsen won the bronze medal in this event at the 1956 Summer Olympics held in Melbourne, Australia as well as the 1954 European Championships in Athletics.

His personal best time was 8:42.4 minutes, achieved in Trondheim on 5 September 1956. This gives him a 23rd place on the Norwegian all-time performers list.
