= Fyodor Marulin =

Soviet middle-distance runner

Personal information
- Full name: Fyodor Vasilyevich Marulin
- Nationality: Soviet
- Born: 1 June 1926 Moscow, USSR

Sport
- Sport: Middle-distance running
- Event: Steeplechase

Fyodor Vasilyevich Marulin (born 1 June 1926) was a Soviet middle-distance runner. He competed in the men's 3000 metres steeplechase at the 1952 Summer Olympics.
