= Pierre Prat =

French middle-distance runner

Personal information
- Nationality: French
- Born: 19 January 1930
- Died: 13 March 2014 (aged 84)

Sport
- Sport: Middle-distance running
- Event: Steeplechase

Pierre Prat (19 January 1930 – 13 March 2014) was a French middle-distance runner. He competed in the men's 3000 metres steeplechase at the 1952 Summer Olympics.
