= Ilkka Auer =

Finnish middle-distance runner

Personal information
- Nationality: Finnish
- Born: 16 March 1930
- Died: 16 August 2013 (aged 83)

Sport
- Sport: Middle-distance running
- Event: Steeplechase

Ilkka Auer (16 March 1930 – 16 August 2013) was a Finnish middle-distance runner. He competed in the men's 3000 metres steeplechase at the 1956 Summer Olympics.
