= Eric Nilsson =

Swedish middle-distance runner (1926–2024)

Personal information
- Full name: Eric Nils Nilsson
- Nationality: Swedish
- Born: 26 December 1926
- Died: 13 June 2024 (aged 97)

Sport
- Sport: Middle-distance running
- Event: Steeplechase

Eric Nils Nilsson (26 December 1926 – 13 June 2024) was a Swedish middle-distance runner. He competed in the men's 3000 metres steeplechase at the 1952 Summer Olympics. He died on 13 June 2024, at the age of 97.
