= Heinz Laufer =

German middle-distance runner

Personal information
- Nationality: German
- Born: 23 May 1925 Schwenningen, Germany
- Died: 26 March 2010 (aged 84) Stuttgart, Germany
- Height: 1.79 m (5 ft 10 in)

Sport
- Sport: Middle-distance running
- Event: Steeplechase

Heinz Laufer (23 May 1925 – 26 March 2010) was a German runner who specialized in the 3000 metres steeplechase. He also ran distances from 1500 to 5000 metres competitively.

He finished fourth in the men's 3000 metres steeplechase at the 1956 Summer Olympics.

In his main event, the steeplechase, he became West German champion in 1956, 1957, 1958 and 1960 and also won silver in 1959 behind Hans Hüneke. In the 1500 metres, he won bronze medals at the West German championships in 1949, 1950, 1951 and 1954. In the 3000 metres (indoors only), he won the West German indoor championships in 1954 and 1958 and took silver in 1955. In the 5000 metres, he became West German champion in 1953 and 1957. He represented the clubs VfL Schwenningen, TG Schwenningen, DSV 1878 Hannover, TG Schwenningen again and from 1957 SpVgg Feuerbach.
