= Apró =

Apró, sometimes spelled Apro, is a surname. Notable people with the surname include:

- Antal Apró (born 1913–1994), Speaker of the National Assembly of Hungary
- József Apró (1920–2003), Hungarian middle-distance runner
