= Grace Padilla =

American athlete

Personal information
- Born: May 29, 1971

Sport
- Sport: Athletics
- Event: 3000 metres steeplechase

Grace Padilla was the second world record holder in the women's 3000 metres steeplechase.

== Career ==
Padilla achieved her world record of 10:30.2 minutes on 17 May 1996 in Los Angeles. The record is unofficial because it was achieved before IAAF recognition of the world record in the event.

Padilla faded to 15th in the 1996 but finished 3rd in 1997 in the 3000 m steeplechase at the USA Championships.

Padila was also a member of a team that holds the United States record for the 4x800 metres relay in the 40+ category. The record of 9:18.33 minutes was achieved on the 14 July 2013 in Olathe, Kansas.

Also as a masters athlete, Padilla won silver in both the 1500 metres and 2000 meters steeplechase in the w40 category at the 2011 World Masters Athletics Championships.

Padilla attended East Los Angeles College, Adams State University and California State University, Los Angeles.
