= Helmut Gude =

German steeplechase runner

- Gude winning the 2nd ISTAF in 1952

Personal information
- Nationality: German
- Born: 23 November 1925 Düren, Germany
- Died: 3 February 2001 (aged 75) Montgomery, Pennsylvania, United States
- Height: 172 cm (5 ft 8 in)
- Weight: 63 kg (139 lb)

Sport
- Sport: Athletics
- Event: Steeplechase

Helmut Gude (23 November 1925 – 3 February 2001) was a German steeplechase runner. He competed in the men's 3000 metres steeplechase at the 1952 Summer Olympics finishing eight. Gude was the first German under 8:50.0 minutes in the steeplechase in 1952.

Gude became German national 3000 metres steeplechase champion in 1951 and 1952. He won the national cross-country championships in 1953 and was runner-up in 1954.

Gude emigrated to the United States in 1954. He became a carpenter.
