= Sándor Rozsnyói =

Hungarian athletics competitor

Medal record

Men's athletics

Representing Hungary

Olympic Games
Silver medal – second place	1956 Melbourne	3000 m st.

European Championships
Gold medal – first place	1954 Bern	3000 m st.

Sándor Rozsnyói (born Sándor Rosner, 24 November 1930 – 2 September 2014) was a Hungarian athlete, who mainly competed in the 3,000-metre steeple chase.

Born in Zalaegerszeg, he competed for Hungary at the 1956 Summer Olympics held in Melbourne, Australia, where he won the silver medal in the men's 3000 m steeplechase.

Rozsnyói absconded from the plane on his return trip to Hungary and became a refugee in Vienna, Austria, as the Soviet Union had invaded Hungary. His wife managed to escape to Austria and reunite with him. After working in Vienna for 7 years, the family migrated to Sydney, Australia.

Rozsnyói lived for much of his life in Epping, NSW, with his wife and sons Alex and Les. He was a PE teacher with the NSW Department of Education.

In 2007, he was awarded the International Fair Play Award for the sportsmanship he displayed when he chose not to challenge the outcome of his 1956 Olympic Steeplechase race.

== Sources ==
- Sportlexikon II. (L–Z). Főszerk. Nádori László. Budapest: Sport. 1986. ISBN 963-253-441-7 (in Hungarian)
- Rózsaligeti László: Magyar olimpiai lexikon. Budapest: Datus. 2000. ISBN 963-00-5577-5 (in Hungarian)
- Révai új lexikona XVI. (Rac–Sy). Főszerk. Kollega Tarsoly István. Szekszárd: Babits. 2005. ISBN 963-9556-26-2

(in Hungarian)

- Rozsnyói on melbourne56.origo.hu (in Hungarian)
- Profile on nssz.hu (in Hungarian)
- szentkoronaradio.com: Interview with Rozsnyói about the olympic final (in Hungarian)

Records
Preceded by Incumbent	Men's Steeplechase World Record Holder; 28 August 1954 – 1 July 1955	Succeeded by (Finland) Pentti Karvonen
Preceded by (Soviet Union) Semyon Rzhishchin	Men's Steeplechase World Record Holder; 16 September 1956 – 2 August 1958	Succeeded by (Soviet Union) Semyon Rzhishchin
