= József Apró =

Hungarian middle-distance runner (1920–2003)

Personal information
- Nationality: Hungarian
- Born: 21 December 1920
- Died: 24 October 2003 (aged 82)

Sport
- Sport: Middle-distance running
- Event: Steeplechase

József Apró (21 December 1920 – 24 October 2003) was a Hungarian middle-distance runner. He competed in the men's 3000 metres steeplechase at the 1952 Summer Olympics.
