= Vladimir Kazantsev (athlete) =

Russian long-distance runner

Personal information
- Born: January 6, 1923 Alekseyevka, Khvalynsky Uyezd, Saratov Governorate, Russian SFSR, Soviet Union
- Died: November 22, 2007 (aged 84) Moscow, Russia
- Height: 176 cm (5 ft 9 in)
- Weight: 66 kg (146 lb)

Sport
- Sport: Athletics
- Events: Steeplechase, 5000 m, 10,000 m
- Club: Dynamo Moscow

Achievements and titles
- Personal bests: 3000 mS – 8:48.6 (1952); 5000 m – 14:08.8 (1952); 10,000 m – 30:20.0 (1950)
Medal record
Representing the Soviet Union
Olympic Games
Silver medal – second place	1952 Helsinki	3000 m steeplechase

Vladimir Dmitriyevich Kazantsev (Russian: Владимир Дмитриевич Казанцев, 6 January 1923 – 22 November 2007) was a Russian long-distance runner who won a silver medal in the 3000 m steeplechase at the 1952 Olympics. He set the world's best times in this event in 1951 and 1952 and won the Soviet title in 1950–53. In the Olympic final he had a 20 m lead with 700 m remaining but injured a tendon in a bad landing after a water jump and was overtaken by Horace Ashenfelter.

Ashenfelter was an FBI agent, while Kazantsev was a KGB officer who retired in the rank of lieutenant colonel. He fought as a private in the German-Soviet War at the Kalinin Front, was wounded in action in 1942 and awarded the Order of the Patriotic War. Besides his KGB service Kazantsev taught physical education at the Soviet Police Academy and worked as an athletics coach, preparing the Soviet team for the 1964 Olympics.
