= Robert Schoonjans =

Belgian steeplechase runner

Personal information
- Nationality: Belgian
- Born: 5 September 1925 Antwerp, Belgium
- Died: 15 March 2011 (aged 85) Leuven, Belgium

Sport
- Sport: Athletics
- Event: Steeplechase
- Club: Union Saint-Gilloise

Robert Schoonjans (5 September 1925 – 15 March 2011) was a Belgian steeplechase runner. He competed in the men's 3000 metres steeplechase at the 1952 Summer Olympics.

Schoonjans finished third behind Petar Šegedin in the steeplechase event at the British 1950 AAA Championships.
