= Urho Julin =

Finnish middle-distance runner

Personal information
- Full name: Urho Johannes Julin
- Nationality: Finnish
- Born: 16 October 1928
- Died: 27 May 2002 (aged 73)

Sport
- Sport: Middle-distance running
- Event: Steeplechase

Urho Johannes Julin (16 October 1928 – 27 May 2002) was a Finnish middle-distance runner. He competed in the men's 3000 metres steeplechase at the 1952 Summer Olympics.
