= Vasily Vlasenko =

Soviet middle-distance runner (1928–2020)

Personal information
- Full name: Vasily Ivanovich Vlasenko
- Nationality: Soviet
- Born: 10 January 1928
- Died: 5 August 2020 (aged 92)

Sport
- Sport: Middle-distance running
- Event: Steeplechase

Vasily Ivanovich Vlasenko (10 January 1928 – 5 August 2020) was a Soviet middle-distance runner. He competed in the men's 3000 metres steeplechase at the 1956 Summer Olympics.
