= Courtney Meldrum =

American long-distance runner

Courtney L. Pugmire Meldrum (born January 31, 1977) is a long-distance runner from the United States, who specializes mainly in the 3000 metres steeplechase. She is a former world record holder in this obstacle race, clocking 10:23.47 on June 23, 1996, in Atlanta, Georgia.

Meldrum won her debut steeplechase at the 1996 USA Outdoor Track and Field Championships after just two weeks of practice in the event. She was an All-American for the BYU Cougars track and field team, finishing runner-up in the flat 3000 meters at the 1998 NCAA Division I Outdoor Track and Field Championships. She married Jeremy Meldrum, another runner, in February 1998. She broke her own American record in 1998.

Records
Preceded by (United States) Gracie Padilla	Women's 3,000 m Steeplechase; World Record Holder; June 23, 1996 – April 18, 1998	Succeeded by (Canada) Karen Harvey
Sporting positions
Preceded by (United States) Gracie Padilla	Women's 3,000 m Steeplechase; World Best Year Performance; 1996	Succeeded by (United States) Melissa Teemant
