= André Lebrun =

French middle-distance runner

Personal information
- Nationality: French
- Born: 1 August 1927
- Died: 8 March 2021 (aged 93)

Sport
- Sport: Middle-distance running
- Event: Steeplechase

André Lebrun (1 August 1927 – 8 March 2021) was a French middle-distance runner. He competed in the men's 3000 metres steeplechase at the 1952 Summer Olympics.
