= Bent Pedersen (footballer) =

Danish footballer (1928-2001)

Personal information
- Date of birth: 13 July 1928
- Date of death: 13 February 2001 (aged 72)

International career
Years	Team	Apps	(Gls)
1956	Denmark	2	(0)

Bent Pedersen (13 July 1928 – 13 February 2001) was a Danish footballer. He played in two matches for the Denmark national football team in 1956.
