= Edward E. Fitzgerald =

American sportswriter, publishing executive, biographer, magazine editor

Edward Earl Fitzgerald
- Edward E. Fitzgerald, Editor Sport magazine
- Born: Edward Earl Fitzgerald; September 10, 1919; Bronx, New York City
- Died: February 11, 2001 (aged 81); New Rochelle, New York, U.S.
- Citizenship: United States
- Occupations: Sportswriter; magazine editor; publishing executive
- Years active: 1940s through 1970s

Edward Earl Fitzgerald (September 10, 1919 – February 11, 2001) was a sports journalist, editor of Sport magazine, executive in chief of the Book-of-the-Month Club, founder of the Quality Paperback Book Club, president of the books division at Doubleday, and president of McCall's Magazine Group. He also edited, authored and co-authored numerous sports books.

== Career ==
After serving in the Army during World War II, Fitzgerald began his journalism career by getting hired as a writer at the newly formed Sport magazine, a monthly which helped define the sports publication genre and predated its future rival Sports Illustrated by a decade. He launched a parallel career as an editor and author of sports books, including Kick-Off! Great Moments on the Gridiron (1948) and The Story of the Brooklyn Dodgers (1949). In addition, he wrote youth-oriented works of fiction in the "Barnes sports novel series".

In 1951, he was promoted to Editor-in-Chief of Sport, a position he held throughout the 1950s. With his stream of published books, and his tenure at Sport, Fitzgerald built a national reputation. Athletes who wanted to write memoirs often sought him out, for example, he edited the 1958 autobiography of tennis star Althea Gibson. During the decade, he found time to edit other magazines, including True Detective and Saga: True Adventures for Men.

In 1960, Fitzgerald was named president of the Doubleday books division, which included the Literary Guild. In 1968, he became president of McCall's Magazine Group, the company which published McCall's, Redbook, and Saturday Review. He continued to co-author sports memoirs, working with Yogi Berra on the Yankee catcher's 1961 autobiography. A few years later, Fitzgerald co-wrote the memoirs of sportscaster Mel Allen and football player Johnny Unitas.

From 1973 through 1984, Fitzgerald headed the Book-of-the-Month Club during its peak membership period when it expanded from general-interest hardcovers into a wide selection of titles as well as specialty niches. He founded the affiliate organization, the Quality Paperback Book Club. He served as Book-of-the-Month Club's president starting in 1973, and was named chief executive in 1979. He oversaw the club's integration into Time Inc. when the latter acquired it in 1977.

== Later years ==
After retiring from the Book-of-the-Month Club in 1984, Fitzgerald penned his own autobiography, entitled A Nickel an Inch. However, he soon discovered that as a retiree, his longtime problem with alcohol drinking was becoming worse. It reached a point where he twice checked himself into the St. Mary's Rehabilitation Center in Minneapolis. His second stay in 1988 proved very beneficial, and he wrote a candid, day-by-day account of the experience in That Place in Minnesota: Changing Lives, Saving Lives (1990), which was praised for its realism. In his last book project, he co-wrote the 1991 autobiography of New York Giants quarterback Jeff Hostetler.

Edward Fitzgerald died on February 11, 2001, in New Rochelle, New York of complications from a stroke. He was 81. He was survived by his wife Libby and their son and daughter.

== Books ==
- Tales for Males. New York: Cadillac Publishing Co. 1945. ASIN B000O6C850.
- Kick-Off! Great Moments on the Gridiron. Fitzgerald, Ed (ed.). New York: Bantam Books, 1948. ASIN B000KRVARU.
- The Turning Point. Barnes sports novel series. New York: A.S. Barnes. 1948. LCCN 48008997.
- The Story of the Brooklyn Dodgers. New York: Bantam Books. 1949. LCCN 49002895.
- College Slugger. Barnes sports novel series. New York: A.S. Barnes. 1950. LCCN 50014747.
- Yankee Rookie. Barnes sports novel series. New York: A.S. Barnes. 1952. LCCN 52008980.
- The Book of Major League Baseball Clubs. Fitzgerald, Ed (ed.). New York: A.S. Barnes, 1952. LCCN 52-8297
- The Book of Major League Baseball Clubs: The American League. Fitzgerald, Ed (ed.). New York: A.S. Barnes, 1952. ASIN B001IOW77Q
- The Book of Major League Baseball Clubs: The National League. Fitzgerald, Ed (ed.). New York: A.S. Barnes, 1952.
- A Treasury of Sport Stories. Fitzgerald, Ed (ed.). New York: Bartholomew House, 1955. LCCN 55-10240
- Champions in Sports and Spirit. Vision Books. 1956. ISBN 978-0000568656.
- The Ballplayer. New York: A.S. Barnes. 1957. LCCN 57005737.
- Gibson, Althea (1958). Fitzgerald, Ed (ed.). I Always Wanted to Be Somebody. New York: HarperCollins. ISBN 978-0060115159.
- More Champions in Sports and Spirit. Vision Books. 1959. LCCN 59010191.
- Heroes of Sport. Fitzgerald, Ed (ed.). New York: Bartholomew House, 1960. LCCN 60-11978
- Johnny Unitas: The Amazing Success Story of Mr. Quarterback. Bartholomew House. 1960.
- Berra, Yogi; Fitzgerald, Ed (1961). Yogi: The Autobiography of a Professional Baseball Player. Garden City, N.Y.: Doubleday. LCCN 61006504.
- Allen, Mel; Fitzgerald, Ed (1964). You Can't Beat the Hours: A Long, Loving Look at Big-League Baseball, Including Some Yankees I Have Known. New York: Harper & Row. LCCN 64012665.
- Unitas, Johnny; Fitzgerald, Ed (1965). Pro Quarterback: My Own Story. New York: Simon and Schuster. ISBN 978-0671601454.
- A Nickel an Inch: A Memoir. New York: Atheneum Books. 1985. ISBN 978-0689115905.
- That Place in Minnesota: Changing Lives, Saving Lives. New York: Viking Adult. 1990. LCCN 89040678.
- Hostetler, Jeff; Fitzgerald, Ed (1991). One Giant Leap. New York: G.P. Putnam's Sons. ISBN 978-0399137075.
