= László Jeszenszky =

Hungarian middle-distance runner

Personal information
- Nationality: Hungarian
- Born: 14 July 1927 Újpest, Budapest, Hungary
- Died: 10 December 2003 (aged 76) Budapest, Hungary

Sport
- Sport: Middle-distance running
- Event: Steeplechase
- Club: MTK, Budapest

László Jeszenszky (14 July 1927 – 10 December 2003) was a Hungarian middle-distance runner. He competed in the 3000 metres steeplechase at the 1952 Summer Olympics and the 1956 Summer Olympics.

Jeszenszky finished second behind Ken Johnson in the steeplechase event at the British 1954 AAA Championships.
