= Robert Lichello =

Robert Lichello (12 September 1926 – 1 February 2001), a native of Parkersburg, West Virginia, was a 20th-century American author of both fiction and non-fiction books. He is noted as the inventor of the "AIM" (Automatic Investment Management) system of investing and was the author of several books on investing, including "How to Make $1,000,000 in the Stock Market Automatically" and "Superpower investing: The Superpower Way to Bank and Invest Your Money."

Following several years service with the Air Transport Command in Japan, Lichello majored in creative writing at West Virginia University, and worked for a radio station in Fairmont, West Virginia. In 1957, he moved to New York and worked for numerous magazines as a reporter, feature writer, and associate editor. Lichello's historical works include biographies of Dag Hammarskjöld, Enrico Fermi, Edward R. Murrow, and Charles R. Drew. He also wrote a book on Jujutsu as a method of self-defense.
