= Charley House =

American baseball player

- Third baseman
- Born: January 1, 1913; Holly Springs, Mississippi, U.S.
- Died: February 1, 2001 (aged 88); River Rouge, Michigan, U.S.

Negro league baseball debut
- 1937, for the Detroit Stars

Last appearance
- 1945, for the Homestead Grays

Teams
- Detroit Stars (1937); Homestead Grays (1945)

Charles Borner House (January 1, 1913 – February 1, 2001), nicknamed "Red", was an American Negro league third baseman in the 1930s and 1940s.

A native of Holly Springs, Mississippi, House played for the Detroit Stars in 1937, and later played for the Homestead Grays in 1945. In 25 recorded career games, he posted 23 hits in 98 plate appearances. House died in River Rouge, Michigan in 2001 at age 88.
