= Sarah Heeb =

American athlete

Sport
- Sport: Athletics
- Event: 3000 metres steeplechase

Sarah Heeb (later Sarah Wilborn) was the first world record holder in the women's 3000 metres steeplechase.

== Career ==
Heeb achieved her American and world record of 10:34.5 minutes on 20 April 1996 in Walnut, California.

The record is unofficial because it was achieved before IAAF recognition of the world record in the event.

Heeb attended the University of Kansas.

Heeb came second in the 3000 m steeplechase at the USA Championships in June 1996 in a time of 10:25.44 minutes.

== Accolades and awards ==
Heeb was inducted into the Hall of Fame of Topeka West High School.
