= William Epstein =

Canadian civil servant (1912–2001)

- Born: July 10, 1912; Calgary, Alberta, Canada
- Died: February 9, 2001 (aged 88); New York City, New York, US
- Occupation: international civil servant
- Awards: Order of Canada

William Epstein, OC (July 10, 1912 – February 9, 2001) was a Canadian international civil servant who worked at the United Nations for 54 years and was considered an expert on disarmament.

Born in Calgary, Alberta, Epstein attended the University of Alberta and the London School of Economics. He was Director of the UN Disarmament Division in the United Nations Secretariat and worked with the first seven United Nations Secretaries-General.

In 1976, his book The Last Chance: Nuclear Proliferation and Arms Control (ISBN 0029096618) was published.

In 1989, he was made an Officer of the Order of Canada, Canada's highest civilian honor.
