= Georges Marie Anne =

Martiniquais politician

Georges Marie Anne (9 October 1906 – 21 February 2001) was a politician from Martinique who was elected to the French Senate in 1959.
