= Jindřich Roudný =

Medal record

Men's athletics

Representing Czechoslovakia

European Championships
Gold medal – first place	1950 Brussels	3000 m st.

Jindřich Roudný (14 February 1924 – 10 May 2015) was a Czech athlete who competed in the 1952 Summer Olympics. He was born in Fukov.
