= Pentti Karvonen =

Finnish steeplechase runner (1931–2022)

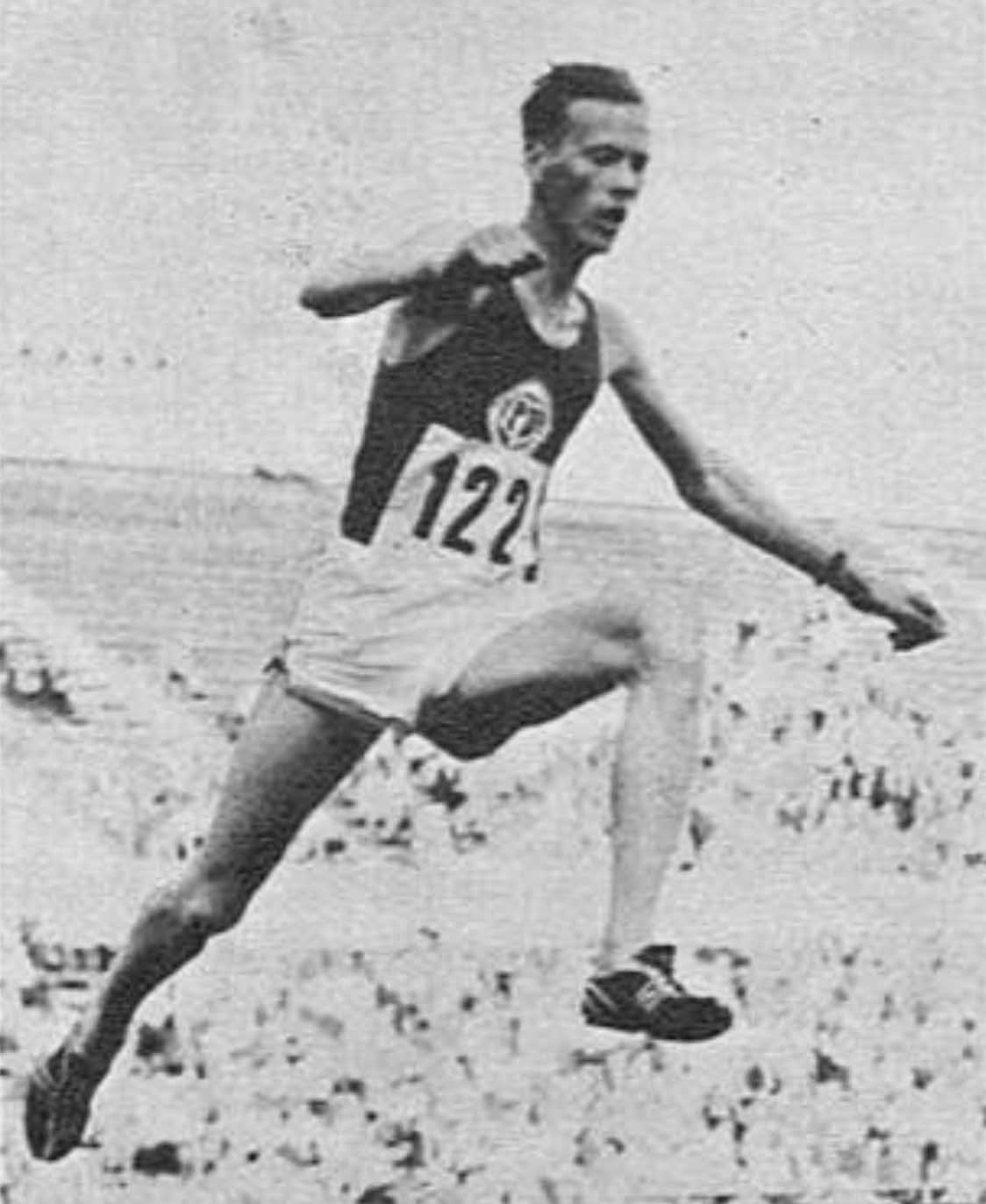
- Karvonen in 1960

Personal information
- Full name: Pentti Kalevi Karvonen
- Nationality: Finnish
- Born: 15 August 1931 Koivisto, Finland
- Died: 12 March 2022 (aged 90) Porvoo, Finland

Sport
- Sport: Steeplechase running

Pentti Kalevi Karvonen (15 August 1931 – 12 March 2022) was a Finnish steeplechase runner. He competed in the men's 3000 metres steeplechase at the 1960 Summer Olympics. Karvonen died on 12 March 2022, at the age of 90.
