= Curt Söderberg =

Swedish steeplechase runner (1927–2010)

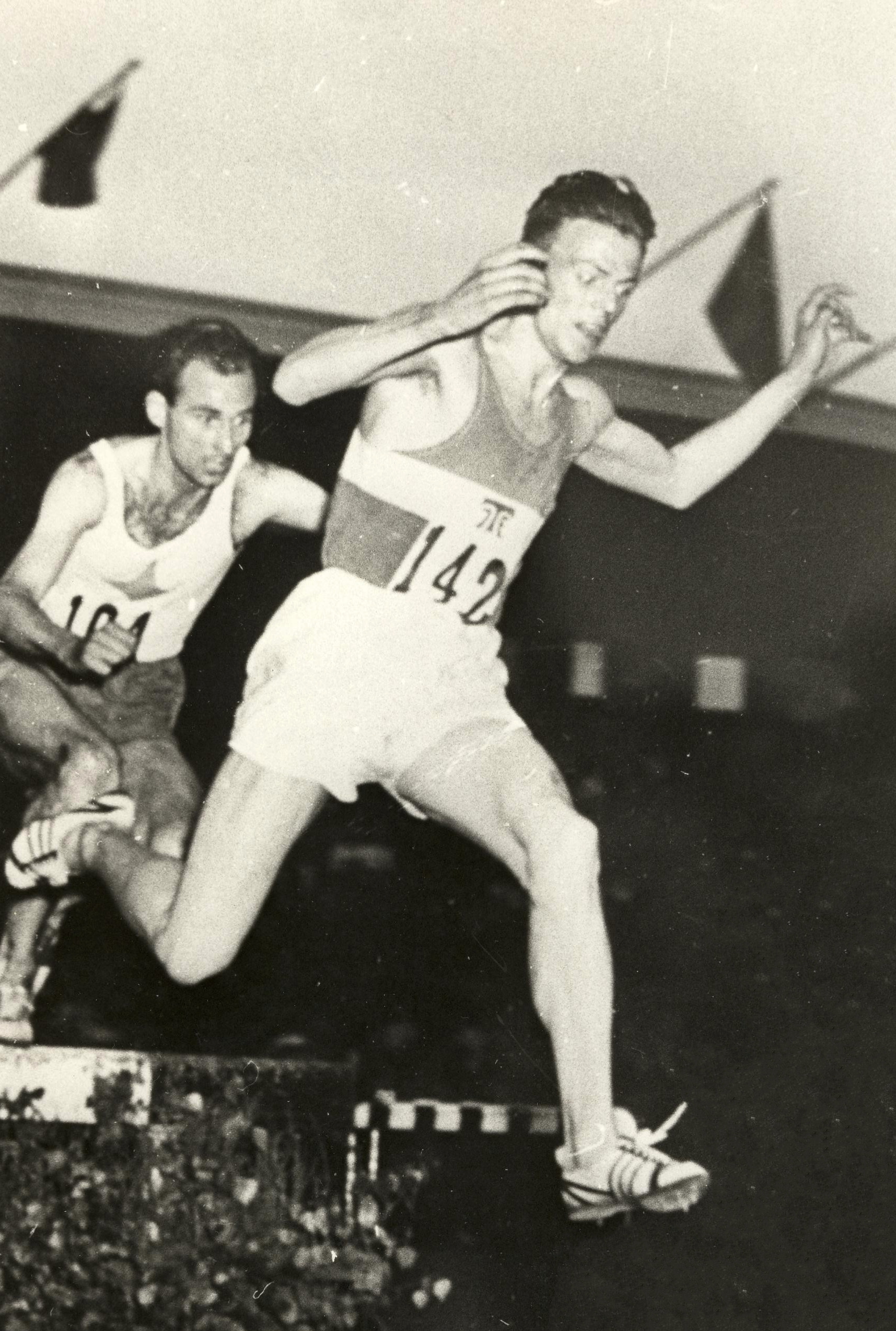
- Curt Söderberg in 1952

Personal information
- Born: 19 January 1927 Sollentuna, Sweden
- Died: 1 September 2010 (aged 83) Sollentuna, Sweden
- Height: 1.74 m (5 ft 9 in)
- Weight: 62 kg (137 lb)

Sport
- Sport: Athletics
- Event: Steeplechase
- Club: Turebergs IF, Sollentuna

Achievements and titles
- Personal best: 3000 mS – 8:52.8 (1954)

Curt Erik Valdemar Söderberg (19 January 1927 – 1 September 2010) was a Swedish steeplechase runner. He competed at the 1950 European Athletics Championships and 1952 Summer Olympics and finished in seventh and fifth place, respectively.

Söderberg won the national junior title in the 1,500 m steeplechase in 1946 and 1947, but was not selected for the 1948 Olympics. He won the senior 3,000 m steeplechase title in 1949–50 and 1953–55 and was ranked within the world's top 10 from 1947 to 1954, reaching #1 in 1949 and #4 in 1950. At the 1952 Olympics he set a national record at 8:55.6 and improved it to 8:52.8 in 1954. He retired around 1957 and later worked as a craft teacher.
