= Karen Harvey =

Canadian athlete

Personal information
- Nationality: Canada
- Born: August 9, 1972 (age 54) Brantford, Ontario, Canada

Sport
- Sport: Athletics
- Event: 3000 metres steeplechase

Karen Harvey, later Karen Harvey Sullivan,(born August 9, 1972) is a former world record holder in the women's 3000 metres steeplechase.

== Early life and education ==
Karen Harvey was born 9 August 1972 in Brantford, Ontario, Canada and brought up in Paris, Ontario.

Harvey was a student at the University of Michigan, where she competed for the Michigan Wolverines track and field team and graduated in 1996 with a degree in anthropology.

== Career ==
=== Athletics career ===
Harvey recorded one world record in the women’s 3000 meters steeplechase of 10:19.6 on 18 April 1998 in Walnut, California.

The mark is unofficial because the world governing body of athletics, the IAAF (now World Athletics), did not recognise a world record in the event until 2000.

Harvey also came 5th in the 3000m steeplechase at the Goodwill Games in 1998.

=== Coaching career ===
Harvey was cross-country coach for the University of Illinois between 2002-6, and in 2007 joined Florida State University and stayed until 2015.

== Awards and accolades ==
In 2012, Harvey was an inductee into the Brantford & Area Sports Hall of Recognition.
