= Ken Johnson (athlete) =

British runner (1928–2015)

Personal information
- Nationality: British (English)
- Born: 14 October 1928 Leicester, England
- Died: 12 December 2015 (aged 87) Oadby, England

Sport
- Sport: Athletics
- Event: steeplechase
- Club: Leicester College of Art & Tech

Kenneth Edward Johnson (14 October 1928 – 12 December 2015) was a British athlete who competed in the 3,000m steeplechase at the 1952 Summer Olympics.

== Biography ==
Born in Leicester, Johnson was a cross country runner, competing for the Leicester Colleges of Art and Technology team, before taking up steeplechase in 1951. He was selected for the Great Britain team at the 1952 Olympics in Helsinki, finishing in seventh place in the first heat and not progressing to the final.

Johnsons finished second behind Eddie Ellis in the steeplechase event at the 1953 AAA Championships and the following year he became the British 3000 metres steeplechase champion after winning the British AAA Championships title at the 1954 AAA Championships.

He went on to represent Great Britain at the 1954 European Athletics Championships in Bern, again going out in the heats. Also in 1954 he won the Midlands steeplechase championship.

Outside of athletics, he worked as an electrical engineer and was a car enthusiast, serving as chairman of the Morris Register club.

Johnson died on 12 December 2015 at his home in Oadby, aged 87.
