= Olavi Rinteenpää =

Finnish steeplechase runner (1924–2022)

Medal record

Men's athletics

Representing Finland

European Championships
Silver medal – second place	1954 Bern	3000 m st.

Olavi Rinteenpää (24 September 1924 – 10 January 2022) was a Finnish steeplechase runner who competed in the 1952 Summer Olympics and in the 1956 Summer Olympics. Rinteenpää died on 10 January 2022, at the age of 97.
