= Gunnar Tjörnebo =

Swedish long-distance runner (1927–2009)

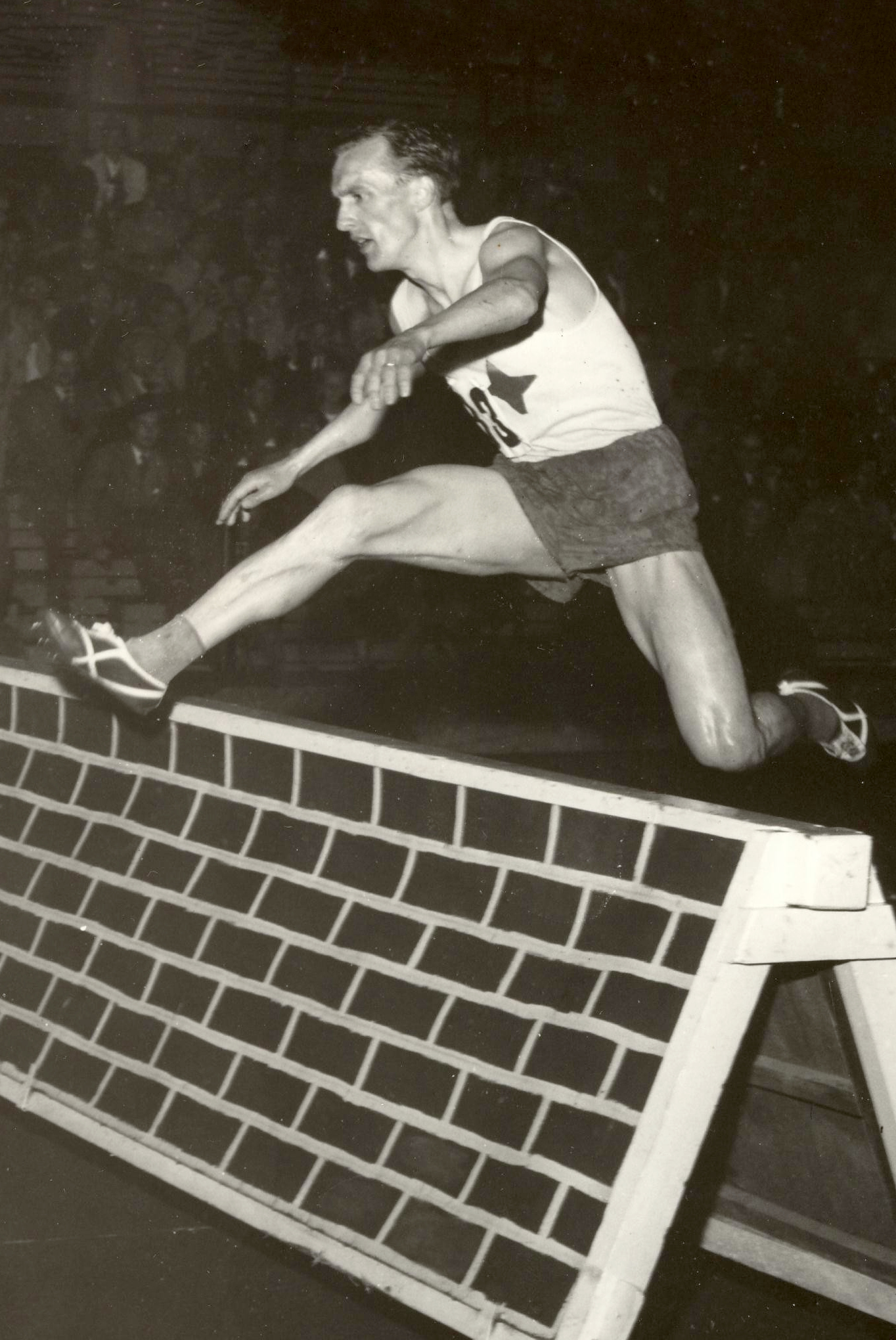

Personal information
- Born: 23 March 1927 Tjörnarp, Sweden
- Died: 15 March 2009 (aged 81) Helsingborg, Sweden
- Height: 1.76 m (5 ft 9 in)
- Weight: 68 kg (150 lb)

Sport
- Sport: Athletics
- Event: 3000 metres steeplechase
- Club: IFK Växjö, IFK Helsingborg

Achievements and titles
- Personal best: 3000 mS – 8:41.2 (1961)

Karl Gunnar Alfred Karlsson-Tjörnebo (23 March 1927 – 15 March 2009) was a Swedish long-distance runner who specialized in the 3000 metres steeplechase. He competed at the Olympic Games three times, with a twelfth place in 1952, a fifth place in 1960 and failed to reach the final in 1956. At home, he won six national championships between 1951 and 1961, and set four Swedish records in his main event.
