= Steeplechase (athletics) =

Obstacle race in athletics

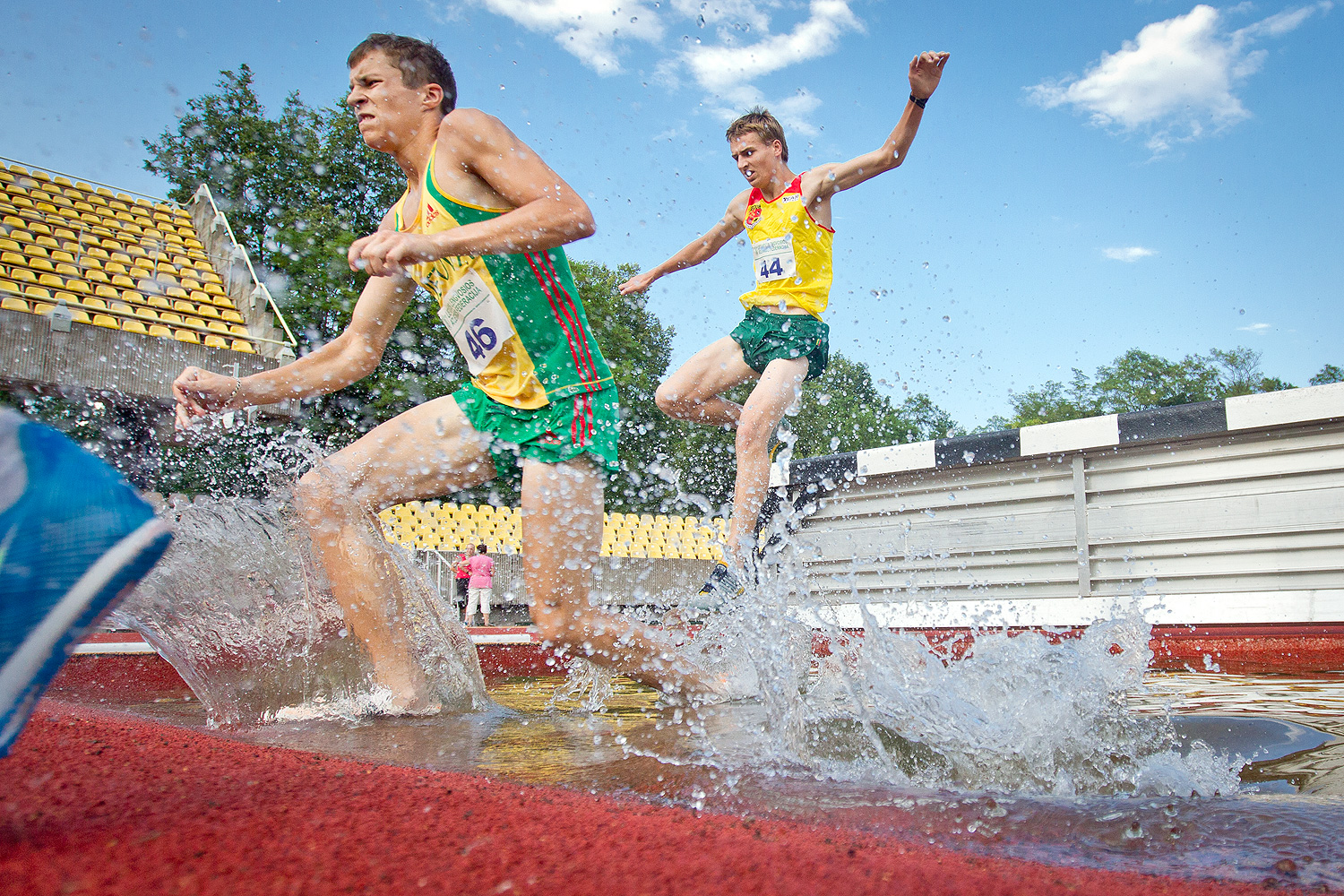
Steeplechase at the 2014 Lithuanian Championships in Athletics

A steeplechase is an obstacle race in athletics which derives its name from the steeplechase in horse racing. The foremost version of the event is the 3000 metres steeplechase. The 2000 metres steeplechase is the next most common distance. In youth athletics, a distance of 1000 metres is occasionally used for steeplechase races.

== History ==
Steeple chasing was originally a horse riding event that grew out of hunting with dogs. A pack of dogs would be set on the trail of the prey while riders on horses chased after the dogs, going through fields and woods and jumping obstacles such as fences, gates, ditches and streams, until the prey was caught. By the start of the nineteenth century hunting for foxes, hares and stags like this was quite common across Britain, and the King kept both a pack of staghounds and a pack of harriers for hunting hares.

When no prey could be found or made to run, riders would engage in a sport known as steeple hunting, or hunt the steeple. This "consists of the horsemen riding helter skelter towards the first church steeple that catches their eye, and he that is in first is the best man." Since riding like this was exhilarating and exciting, people started going out for the specific purpose of racing like this. These races are thought to have started in Ireland and the sport, now being called, "steeple race", arrived in England in November 1796 when three men raced from Barkby Holt to Billesdon Coplow, Leicestershire, and back again, for a stake of one hundred guineas. The winner, Mr. C. Meynell, covered the nine miles in twenty-six minutes. The term "steeple chase" first appears in the British Newspaper Archive in this context on 20 March 1802, "steeple-chase" first appears on 12 July 1811, and "steeplechase" on 30 December 1819.

The earliest mention of a foot race being called a steeplechase took place in the back garden of a pub in Edinburgh in May 1827. This is the first public meeting of the Edinburgh Six Foot Club, at Hunter's Tryst, where they had three sports, quoits, rifle shooting, and this single foot race they called a steeplechase. What the race actually consisted of is not known, other than that it was called a steeplechase, the finish was by a hand-held flag, and the winner was awarded a silver medal. The following year they had a very similar meeting where the steeplechase is described as being "about a mile", but the winner took a mere "three minutes and a half", suggesting that these details are not correct. The following year, 1829, the winner took six minutes. This race differed from modern steeplechase races due to the absence of a water obstacle of some kind. The earliest known foot race that was both called a steeplechase and had a water obstacle took place on 24 July 1829, on the banks of the river Leithen, about twenty-five miles from Edinburgh, at the St Ronan's Border Games. The winner was George Laidlaw, a shepherd from Crosslee in Ettrick Forest, and a cousin to the author James Hogg.

a red flag being placed upon a hill at a distance, the candidates were started in the middle of the wood, and every man chose his own road to the point, and his road back again through waters and corn fields, over dykes and ditches, while the rain which came on suddenly was pouring on them abundantly.

The steeplechase would remain a rough cross country race for a number of years until it was established that races could start or finish on, and eventually be held entirely on, a running track. At the same time cross country running was beginning to develop from paper chasing, or Hare and Hounds as it was also being called, and it began to emerge that there was a difference between cross country and steeplechase. In cross country running all the runners followed the same route, but in steeplechase runners were given a start and end point and found their own way, as long as they adhered to local rules about how much of the route could be covered on roads or paths, and that they were not allowed to leap a gate or stile, but had to go over the hedge, ditch or fence.

The first school to have a steeplechase was Rugby, in April 1834. The pupils organised it themselves, starting from a field one mile outside of town, they ran to the top of Barby Hill, around four miles away. On the way they encountered a "tremendous" hedge with a brook on the other side of it, and several boys lost a shoe in the mud.

Later the same month, Liddesdale Gymnastic Society held their first meeting on the haugh at Mangerton Holm, near Newcastleton, consisting mostly of jumping and throwing events, 22-lb shot put, and standing triple jump. Andrew Gray, a baker's apprentice from Hawick, set a world best in the long jump of 18 ft 3 in (5.56 m). They also had three foot races, 500 yards, 1 mile, and a steeplechase of unknown length won by James Waugh from Toftholm in Liddesdale. This was the first time the steeplechase had been included in a meet alongside other events that were exclusively from the sport of athletics. Although the route was unknown, the following year it was described as "a bold ravine with the Liddel flowing in the dale, the distance being to and from the high ground on either side. There was a fair proportion of stone walls, and hedges, as well as the river, and rising and falling ground, and all was cleared in fine style".

By this time, other Highland and Border Games were holding races they called a steeplechase. The Highland Club of Scotland held one on Inchkeith Island in July 1828, the East-Lothian Tyneside Games had one in Amisfield Park, Haddington, in October 1833, and the Tillside Border Games held one at Etal in Northumberland in April 1836, but there was no water jump involved in these races. Water jumps were more common in steeplechases south of the border. In April 1834, at Trenley Park, near Fordwich, about three miles east of Canterbury, eleven men from the villages of Sturry, Fordwich, and Westbere ran a steeplechase that required them to navigate nine ditches, two streams around eighteen feet wide, and then they crossed the River Stour, which at that point was over forty feet wide and five feet deep. This last was, as the newspaper explained, "truly formidable to such of the sportsmen as were unable to swim." Henry Cart of Fordwich was the winner, covering the one mile route in a little over eight minutes.

In August that year, on the other side of Canterbury, near Whitehall Dyke, there was a steeplechase on a more lavish scale, with fireworks, and prizes, and a band, and a signal gun for the start, and tents serving refreshments to the three thousand spectators who turned up to watch the runners swim the River Stour, four feet deep at that point. This time fourteen runners negotiated twenty leaps, over "rather more than a mile", and the winner was Henry Friar (Harbledown) in 8:15, earning a prize of three pounds. At the finish each runner was given a glass of brandy, and in the evening they all dined together in a local inn.

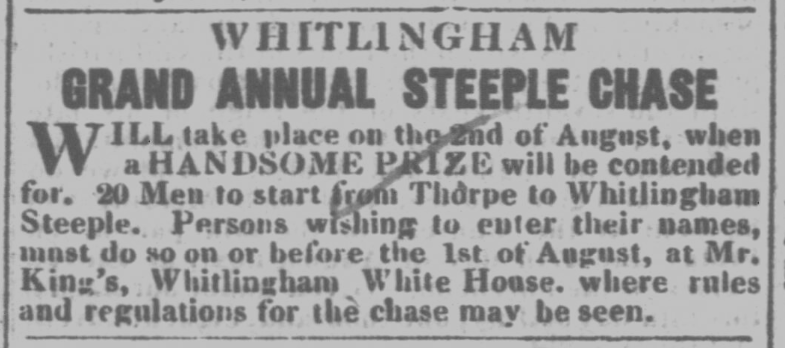
Advertisement for the Whitlingham Steeplechase in 1838

In May 1837 Princess Victoria celebrated her eighteenth birthday, and towns and villages up and down the country had festivities and sports on the occasion. At Mottisfont in Hampshire, midway between Salisbury and Winchester, their sports included three steeplechases for different age groups, the first age-graded steeplechases. The open race was for all comers, a second race was for runners aged between sixteen and twenty-one, and a third race was for runners under sixteen years of age. No results are available, but, "two rivers were crossed, and several hedges and ditches were cleared in good style."

In 1838 following the coronation of Queen Victoria public sport formed a part of the celebrations in many parts of the country. There were at least a dozen steeplechases held in places as far apart as Innerleithen and Roslin in Scotland, Edgbaston near Birmingham, Midsomer Norton in Somerset and Mottisfont in Hampshire. Cardiff and Cowbridge both held steeplechases on 28 June, coronation day itself, sharing the honour of the first steeplechase in Wales.

By 1840 the steeplechase had become sufficiently popular that in just one month there were ten races in different parts of the country, with six of these held over the three-day Easter weekend, the traditional date for the end of the season for the horse racing steeple chase.

At Birkenhead on the 1st April, seventeen men ran one mile and a half "over a sporting country" in front of a small crowd. On the fifteenth, nine men contested a steeplechase of three-quarters of a mile at Kensington, to the east of the city of Liverpool. Then on Good Friday, at the Wooler Gymnastic Games in Northumberland, Anthony Dag cleared 10 feet (3.05 m) in the standing long jump and 40 ft (12.19 m) in the triple jump, then three shepherds running barefoot contested a steeplechase of one mile for a new hat, "over bog, moor, dyke, and whin, directly up the face of a hill". The same day, at Blandy's Farm, on the Bath Road near Worcester, seventeen men dressed as horse racing jockeys ran a "steeple match" of about a mile with eight jumps in six minutes. The following day, ten men similarly attired "crossed many ditches, a beck and a rivulet", in front of "vast numbers" of spectators at Driffield, in the East Riding of Yorkshire.

For the first of three races on Easter Monday the banks of the River Kennet at Newbury were lined with spectators to witness a race from the Old Dog Kennel (an inn) a distance of a mile and a half "over meadows and through two large brooks". At Wells Next the Sea ten "fine young robust fellows" ran a steeplechase across Holkham Marshes. And the day ended with a steeplechase at Newark, where 3,000 spectators watched six young men run a mile and a half including a crossing of the River Trent, "full 20 feet wide".

On Tuesday 21 April an estimated 15,000 spectators lined the Park in front of Nottingham Castle to watch a steeplechase that took the runners through the Park, across the River Leen, then across the Nottingham Canal (five feet deep), then another dyke six yards wide, and across some meadows to the railway embankment where they turned round and retraced their route back to the Park.

Though still run across country, the steeplechase has emerged as distinctly different from cross country running. The steeplechase is a shorter race, requiring no more than around nine or ten minutes of running, whereas at this time cross country was commonly more than six miles and up to around ten miles. The steeplechase was increasingly seen as a spectator sport, with route planning considering where the spectators will view the race, and these two factors combined mean that betting had become a part of the sport, with odds being quoted in the newspapers and on-course betting being an added excitement for the crowds.

The earliest venue to have a man-made water jump was the Royal Military College, Sandhurst. There was no track at the college and the races for the cadets annual athletic sports were held on a network of gravel footpaths on the park between the college buildings and Lower Lake, one of two lakes on the grounds. The steeplechase was 800 yards long, and had 12 flights of hurdles and a wet ditch, fourteen feet wide, with an embankment three feet high. It is not known how deep the water was, but accounts of races do not mention athletes swimming or being submerged.

The first steeplechase to take place entirely on a running track was at the Civil Service Sports at Beaufort House in May 1868. The race required athletes to negotiate four hurdles and a water jump, with a furze hedge on the take-off side, with all obstacles being encountered twice in the 700 yard race. The winner was Sydney Abbott of the British Museum.

The Amateur Athletic Association Championship (AAA) was the de facto World Championship of athletics until the IAAF (now World Athletics) World Championships started in the 1980s. At the first AAA Championships in 1880 the steeplechase was run over 1 mile and 1,440 yards and won by James Concannon of Widnes Football Club. The distance was standardised at 2 miles from 1913 when it was won in 11:03.6 by Charles Ruffell of Highgate Harriers, his only AAA championship win. The first man to defend his title was William Snook (Moseley Harriers) who won it in 1884 and 1885. The first winner from outside the British Isles was George Orton of Canada in 1898, and the only non-British athlete to win it more than once was Petar Šegedin (Yugoslavia) with wins in 1950 and 1951. Maurice Herriott (Sparkhill Harriers) won the AAA title eight times, including seven consecutive wins from 1961 to 1967.

The steeplechase was not run at the modern Olympic Games until 1900, when they hosted two steeplechase races. On 15 July, six men lined up for a 2,500 metres steeplechase with a water jump, hurdles, and stone fences on each of five laps of the Croix Catelan track in Paris. George Orton (Canada) hung back for most of the race but came through strongly on the final lap to become the first Olympic steeplechase champion, and Canada's first Olympic champion. The following day they faced eight laps of the same course for a 4,000 metres steeplechase won by John Rimmer (Great Britain) who led from start to finish. They had further races at different distances in 1904 and 1908 and the event was first held over 3000 metres at the 1920 games in Antwerp, when the winner, in 10:00.4, was Percy Hodge of Great Britain.

The steeplechase was not on the programme for the first European Athletics Championships in Turin in 1934, so the first European champion was Lars Larsson who ran 9:16.2 to win Sweden's only gold medal on the track at the second European Championships at Stade Yves-du-Manoir in Paris on 5 September 1938.

The first two iterations of the World Athletics Championships consisted of a limited number of events that had been excluded from that year's Olympic Games. The first World Championships to include the full suite of men's and women's events was at Helsinki, Finland, in August 1983, and the first World Champion in a time 8:15.06 was Patriz Ilg of West Germany.

The National Collegiate Athletic Association (NCAA), of the United States, introduced a 2 miles steeplechase in 1948, the first winner, in 9:25.7, being Browning Ross (Villanova). But to start with they held it only in Olympic years, so the next winner was Bob McMullen of San Jose State in 1952. It didn't become an annual event until 1959 when it was won by John Macy (Houston) who finished fifth in 1960. The first man to successfully defend his title was Victor Zwolak of Villanova who won it in 1963 (9:10.1) and 1964 (8:42.0).

Due to variations in the size, number, and spacing of the hurdles, and the size and position of the water jump, performances before 1954 are not comparable, but the first man under ten minutes was Josef Ternström of Sweden who ran 9:49.8 at Malmö on 4 July 1914, the first man under nine minutes was Erik Elmsäter of Sweden who ran 8:59.6 in Stockholm on 4 August 1944. By 1954 when the event was standardised and world records were first recognised the Finnish national record and best performance by an amateur was 8:44.4 by Olavi Rinteenpää at Helsinki on 2 July 1953.

The first world record for the event was ratified as 8:49.6 by Sándor Rozsnyói of Hungary in Bern, Switzerland, on 28 August 1954. Because the Finnish record was not ratified as a world record, for a time the Finnish national record was better than the world record, but the situation was resolved within a year when Jerzy Chromik of Poland ran 8:41.2 in an international meet between Czechoslovakia and Poland at Brno on 31 August 1955.

Gaston Roelants of Belgium was the first man under 8:30, running 8:29.6 at Leuven, Belgium on 7 September 1963, and on 16 August 1995 Moses Kiptanui of Kenya broke eight minutes for the first time running 7:59.18 at the Weltklasse meet at Zurich, Switzerland.

Other notable exponents of the event include Volmari Iso-Hollo of Finland who set three world records and won Olympic Gold medals in 1932 and 1936 and is the only man to have defended the Olympic title. Anders Gärderud of Sweden set four world records in the event between 1972 and 1976. Henry Rono of Kenya set in 1978 the last hand-timed world record of 8:05.4 that lasted for eleven years and two months until it was beaten by his fellow Kenyan Peter Koech in Stockholm in July 1989.

At a senior level, women's steeplechase started in the Soviet Union in the 1980s, with early races over 2000 metres taking place in Kyiv, Gorkiy, and Vilnius. But the first significant race in women's steeplechase was at the World Veterans Games in Melbourne, in December 1987, where they held an invitation 2000 metres steeplechase for women over the age of 35. The winner was Fay Riley (New Zealand) who ran 8.43.79. At their next championships, by now being called the World Veterans Championships, in Eugene, Oregon in August 1989, they held four different championships for women in different age groups with Robyn Winter (New Zealand) winning the W35 event in 8:37.19.

Starting in 1988, the Soviet Union held a 2000 metres steeplechase championship for women, the first winner being Marina Pluzhnikova (6:16.41). From 1991, the United States held a 2000 metres non-championship race for women at their national championships, which became a 3000 metres non-championship race in 1995 then in 1998 Courtney Meldrum became the first woman to win a national championship at 3000 metres steeplechase running 10:21.00 at the Tad Gormley Stadium in New Orleans. Argentina (Verónica Páez), Australia (Melissa Rollison), Canada (Karen Harvey), Poland (Justyna Bąk), and Russia (Yelena Motalova) all had a women's 3000 metres steeplechase championship in 1999. Daniela Petrescu (Romania) was the first woman under ten minutes, running 9:55.3 at Bucharest on 20 June 1998 and by the end of the century the best time was 9:48.9 to Yelena Motalova of Russia at Tula on 31 July 1999.

Finland (Johanna Risku), France (Céline Rajot), New Zealand (Rachel Penney) and Norway (Susanne Wigene) all held women's 3000 metres championships in 2000. The first British champion was Tina Brown of Coventry Godiva Harriers in 2004, while Maria McCambridge of Dundrum, Ireland, won the first Scottish championship in 2007, and in the same year Roisin McGettigan became the first women's steeplechase champion of Ireland.

The NCAA adopted the women's event in 2001, the first winner, in 9:49.73, was Elizabeth Jackson of Brigham Young University. In 2005 Dorcus Inzikuru won the first World Championship in the women's event in Helsinki, becoming Uganda's first gold medallist at the World Championships, and in 2008, at the National Stadium in Beijing, Gulnara Samitova-Galkina, of Russia became both the inaugural Olympic champion in the event and with a time of 8:58.81 she became the first woman under nine minutes for the 3000 metres steeplechase.

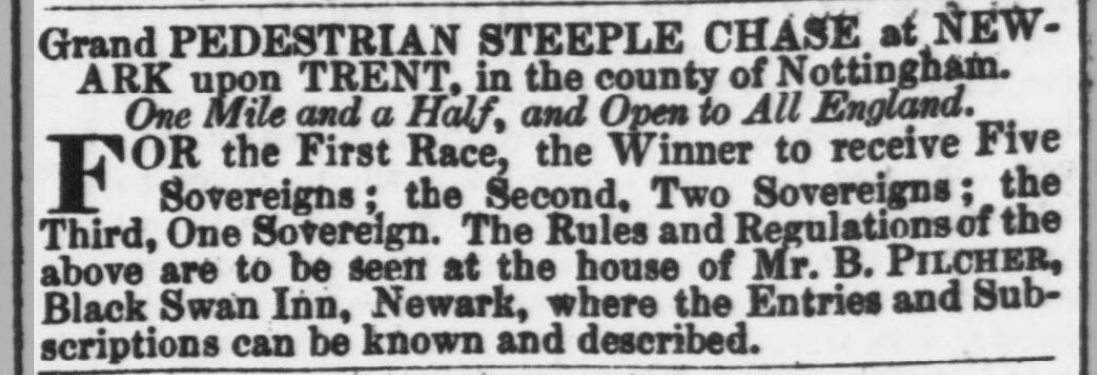
Advertisement for a steeplechase open to All England to be held near Newark, Nottinghamshire, on Good Friday, 17 April 1840

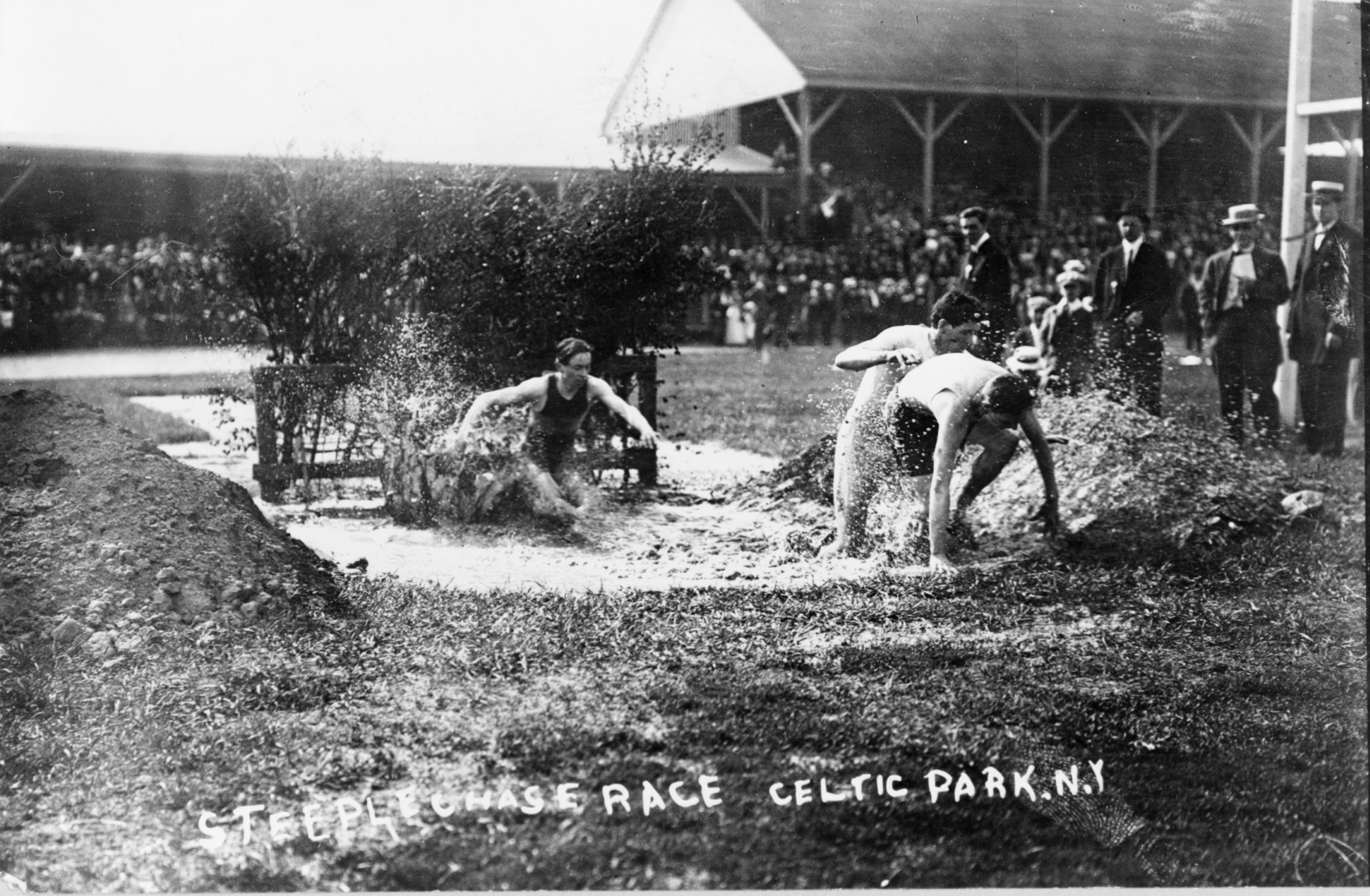
Steeplechase in Celtic Park, New York, in 1912

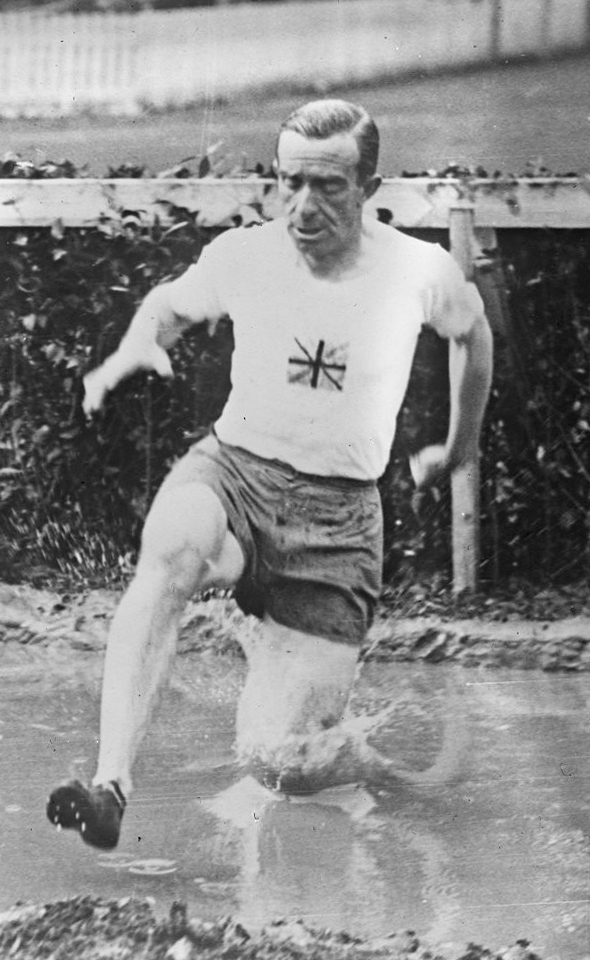
Percy Hodge at the water jump in the 1920 Olympics

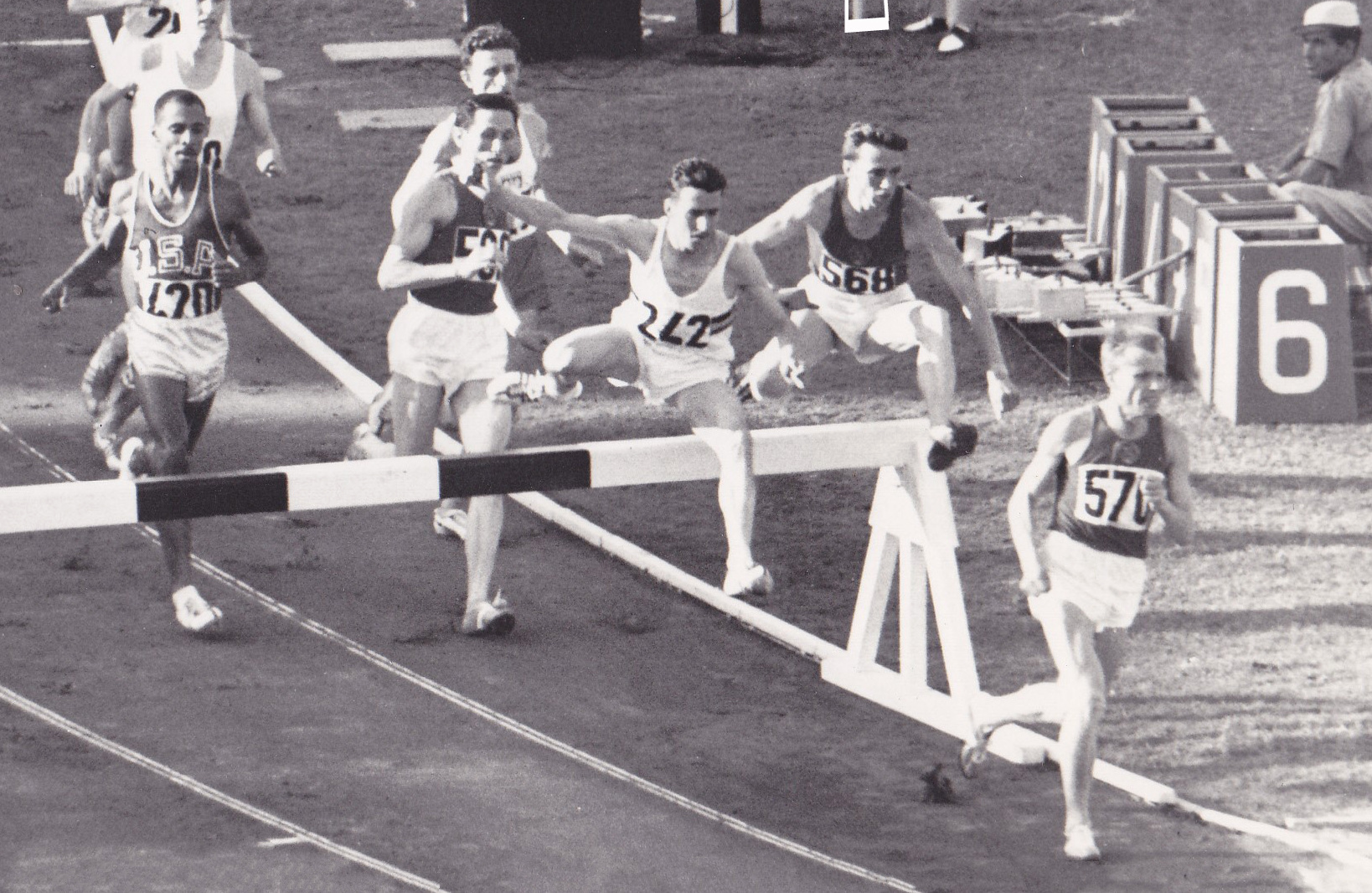
Olympic Final, Rome 1960, 420 Deacon Jones (United States), 569 Semyon Rzhishcin (Russia), 242 Gaston Roelants (Belgium), 568 Nikolay Sokolov (Russia), 570 Aleksey Konov (Russia)

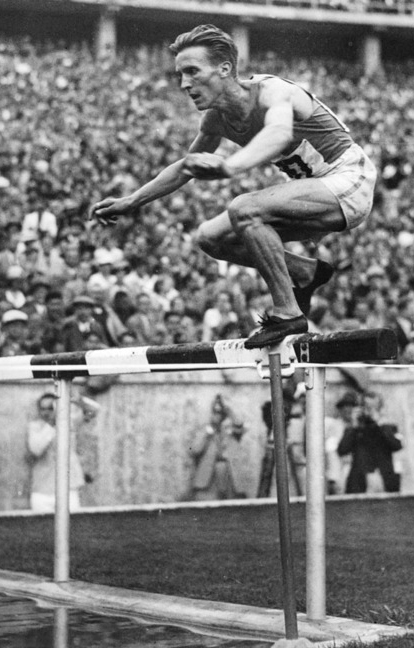
Volmari Iso-Hollo at the water jump in the 1936 Olympics

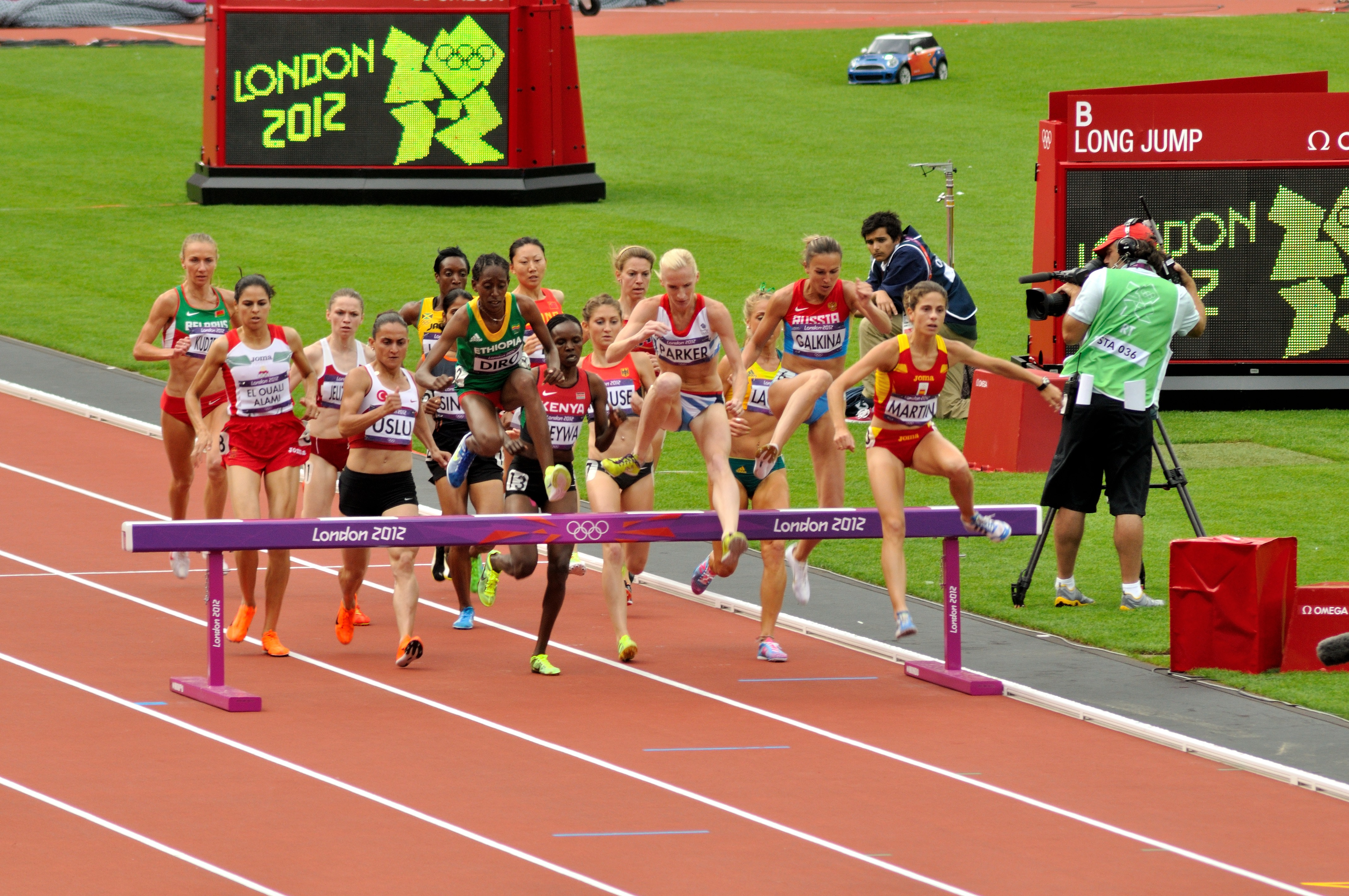
Heat one, women's 3000m steeplechase, London 2012, Sviatlana Kudzelich, Salima El Ouali Alami, Polina Jelizarova, Binnaz Uslu, Korene Hinds, Sudha Singh, Etenesh Diro, Zhenzhu Li, Milcah Chemos Cheywa, Gesa Felicitas Krause, Shalaya Kipp, Barbara Parker, Genevieve LaCaze, Gulnara Galkina, Diana Martín

== Format ==
A 3000 metres steeplechase is defined in the rulebook as having 28 barriers and seven water jumps. A 2000 meters steeplechase has 18 barriers and five water jumps. Since the water jump is never on the track oval, a steeplechase "course" is never a perfect 400 meters lap. Instead, the water jump is placed inside the turn, shortening the lap, or outside the turn, lengthening the lap. The start line moves from conventional starting areas in order to compensate for the different length of lap. When the water jump is inside, the 3000-metre start line is on the backstretch (relative to the steeplechase finish). When the water jump is outside, the 3000-metre start line is on the home stretch. The 2000-metre start line reverses that pattern and uses 5/7 the amount of compensation.

== See also ==
- Hurdling
