= Nemetz =

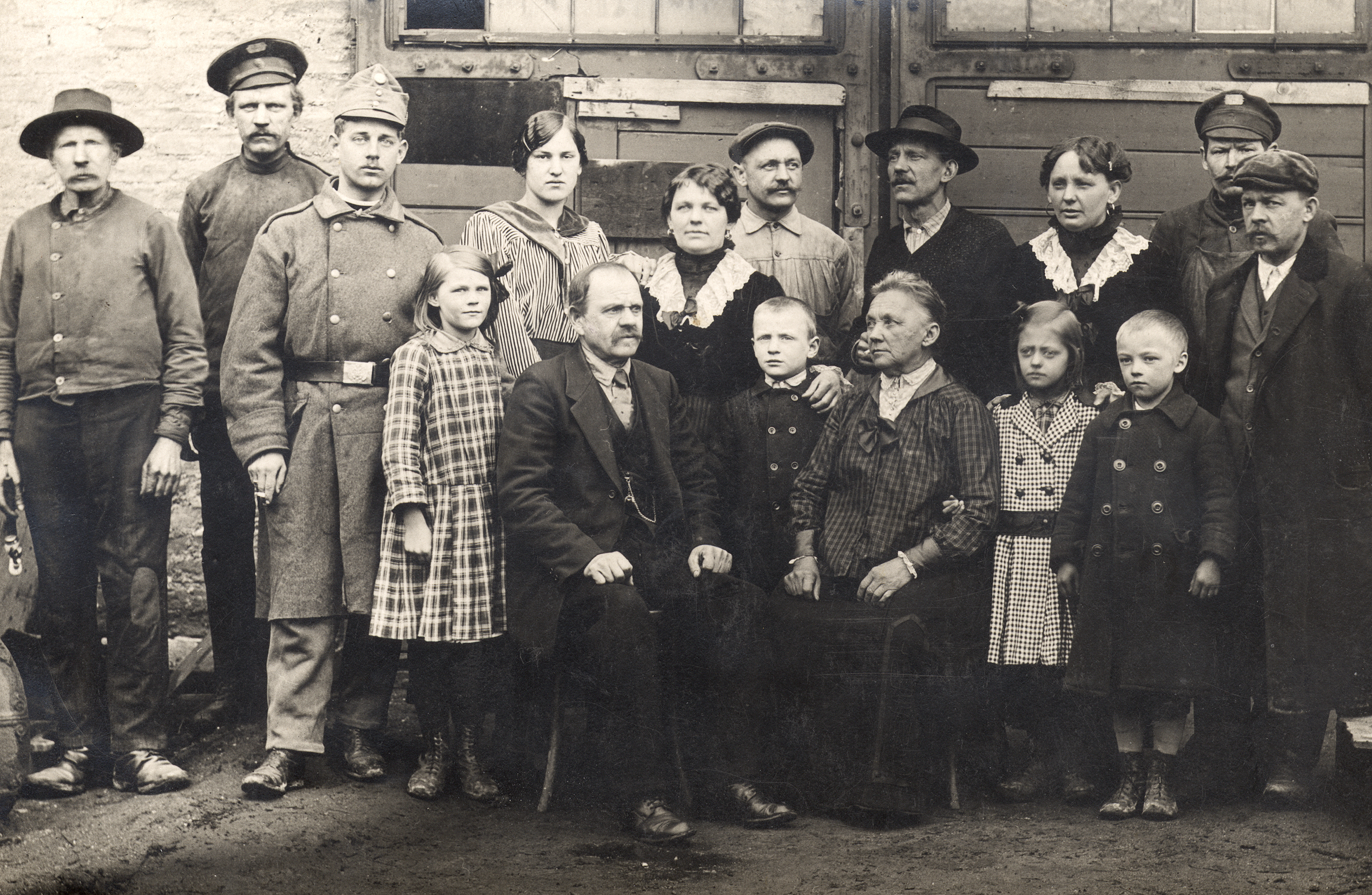
Nematz family, 1916

Nemetz is a German surname of Slavic origin that comes from a variation on the Slavic word Němec, meaning "German" or "mute". Notable people with the surname include:

- Anna Nemetz-Schauberger
- Andreas Nemetz (1799–1846), Moravian bandmaster and composer
- Dave Nemetz, American business executive
- Karoline Nemetz (born 1958), Swedish distance runner
- Kurt Nemetz (1926–2008), Austrian cyclist
- Lenora Nemetz, American actress
- Lillian Boraks-Nemetz
- Max Nemetz (1886–1971), German actor
- Nathaniel Nemetz (1913–1997), Canadian lawyer and judge

== See also ==
- Nemitz
- Nimitz
