= Niemitz =

Niemitz is a German surname of Slavic origin that comes from a variation on the Slavic words Niemiec, Němec. It is associated with the noble Silesian Niemitz family. Notable people with the surname include:

- Carsten Niemitz (born 1945), German biologist

== See also ==
- Nimitz
