= Vobořil =

Vobořil (feminine: Vobořilová) is a Czech surname, a phonetic variant of "Obořil" derived from a nickname which is the simple past of the verb obořit. Germanized variants: Woboril, Woborill,, also Woborschil, Woborzil (here 'rsch' and 'rz' are approximate phonetic transcriptions of Czech 'Ř'). Notable people with the surname include:

- Germán Voboril, Argentine footballer
- Jiřina Vobořilová, birth name of Jiřina Němcová (1937–2018), Czech athlete
- Milan Vobořil, Czech ice hockey player
