= Athletics at the 1960 Summer Olympics – Men's discus throw =

Men's discus throw at the Games of the XVII Olympiad
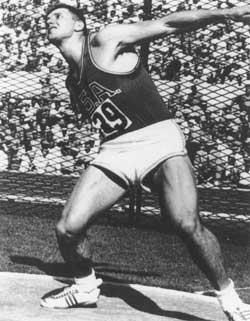
- Al Oerter
- Venue: Olympic Stadium
- Dates: September 6, 1960 (qualifying round); September 7, 1960 (final round)
- Competitors: 35 from 22 nations
- Winning distance: 59.18 OR

Medalists
1st place, gold medalist(s)		Al Oerter; United States
2nd place, silver medalist(s)		Rink Babka; United States
3rd place, bronze medalist(s)		Dick Cochran; United States

The men's discus throw throwing event at the 1960 Summer Olympics took place on September 6 & September 7. Thirty-five athletes from 22 nations competed. The maximum number of athletes per nation had been set at 3 since the 1930 Olympic Congress. The event was won by Al Oerter of the United States, the nation's third consecutive and 10th overall victory in the men's discus throw. It was Oerter's second gold medal in the event; he would go on to win four. Oerter was the sixth man to win two medals in the event, and the third to win two gold medals. The United States earned its second consecutive and third overall medal sweep in the event, as Rink Babka took silver and Dick Cochran bronze.

== Background ==
This was the 14th appearance of the event, which is one of 12 athletics events to have been held at every Summer Olympics. Returning finalists from the 1956 Games were gold medalist Al Oerter of the United States, sixth-place finisher (and 1948 gold medalist and 1952 silver medalist) Adolfo Consolini of Italy, seventh-place finisher Ferenc Klics of Hungary, twelfth-place finisher Kim Bukhantsov of the Soviet Union, thirteenth-place finisher Fanie du Plessis of South Africa, fourteenth-place finisher Erik Uddebom of Sweden, and fifteenth-place finisher Mesulame Rakuro of Fiji. Oerter and Rink Babka were the favorites, with Oerter a slight edge. Oerter was AAU champion in 1957, 1969, and 1960; Babka beat Oerter in the U.S. Olympic trials and set the world record a month before the Games.

Bulgaria, Iraq, and New Zealand each made their debut in the men's discus throw; Germany competed as the "United Team of Germany" for the first time. The United States made its 14th appearance, having competed in every edition of the Olympic men's discus throw to date.

== Competition format ==
The competition used the two-round format introduced in 1936, with the qualifying round completely separate from the divided final. In qualifying, each athlete received three attempts; those recording a mark of at least 52.00 metres advanced to the final (a steep increase from 1956's 47.00 metres, which had allowed 16 men to advance, though not nearly steep enough: 22 men beat the qualifying mark in 1960). If fewer than 12 athletes achieved that distance, the top 12 would advance. The results of the qualifying round were then ignored. Finalists received three throws each, with the top six competitors receiving an additional three attempts. The best distance among those six throws counted.

== Records ==
Prior to the competition, the existing world and Olympic records were as follows.

World record	Rink Babka (USA)	59.91	Walnut, United States	12 August 1960
Olympic record	Al Oerter (USA)	56.36	Melbourne, Australia	27 November 1956

Al Oerter had a very short throw in the first set of qualifying round throws, but in the second set he qualified for the final with a launch that broke his own Olympic record by over 2 metres—landing at 58.43 metres. His teammates Rink Babka (three times) and Dick Cochran (once) both exceeded the old record in the final, but only Oerter was able to beat his new record; Oerter threw 59.18 metres in the fifth throw of the final. All six of Oerter's final throws were longer than the old record.

== Schedule ==
All times are Central European Time (UTC+1)

Date	Time	Round
Tuesday, 6 September 1960	9:00	Qualifying
Wednesday, 7 September 1960	15:00	Final

== Results ==
All throwers reaching 52.00 metres advanced to the finals. All distances are listen in metres.

=== Qualifying ===
Rank	Athlete	Nation	1	2	3	Distance	Notes
1	Al Oerter	United States	46.33	58.43 OR	—	58.43	Q, OR
2	József Szécsényi	Hungary	55.52	—	—	55.52	Q
3	Pentti Repo	Finland	54.84	—	—	54.84	Q
4	Rink Babka	United States	54.48	—	—	54.48	Q
5	Edmund Piątkowski	Poland	54.41	—	—	54.41	Q
6	Vladimir Trusenyov	Soviet Union	54.31	—	—	54.31	Q
7	Dick Cochran	United States	53.79	—	—	53.79	Q
8	Cees Koch	Netherlands	53.48	—	—	53.48	Q
9	Zdeněk Čihák	Czechoslovakia	49.79	51.83	53.42	53.42	Q
10	Ferenc Klics	Hungary	53.34	—	—	53.34	Q
11	Todor Artarski	Bulgaria	X	53.33	—	53.33	Q
12	Kim Bukhantsov	Soviet Union	53.08	—	—	53.08	Q
13	Lothar Milde	United Team of Germany	53.04	—	—	53.04	Q
14	Zenon Begier	Poland	53.03	—	—	53.03	Q
15	Carmelo Rado	Italy	52.98	—	—	52.98	Q
16	Stein Haugen	Norway	52.75	—	—	52.75	Q
17	Zdeněk Němec	Czechoslovakia	52.68	—	—	52.68	Q
18	Viktor Kompaniyets	Soviet Union	50.67	52.66	—	52.66	Q
19	Antonios Kounadis	Greece	52.49	—	—	52.49	Q
20	Adolfo Consolini	Italy	52.38	—	—	52.38	Q
21	Manfred Grieser	United Team of Germany	50.22	52.20	—	52.20	Q
22	Warwick Selvey	Australia	52.07	—	—	52.07	Q
23	Fanie du Plessis	South Africa	X	49.84	51.86	51.86	
24	Östen Edlund	Sweden	51.76	49.15	49.70	51.76	
25	Carol Lindroos	Finland	X	51.07	X	51.07	
26	Pierre Alard	France	51.02	48.89	50.32	51.02	
27	Erik Uddebom	Sweden	50.04	50.87	50.83	50.87	
28	Les Mills	New Zealand	49.69	50.76	44.75	50.76	
29	Franco Grossi	Italy	48.76	48.64	50.43	50.43	
30	Fritz Kühl	United Team of Germany	X	50.40	X	50.40	
31	Mike Lindsay	Great Britain	49.07	X	50.15	50.15	
32	Mesulame Rakuro	Fiji	44.73	47.06	47.18	47.18	
33	Haider Khan	Pakistan	45.75	46.57	41.57	46.57	
34	Nayef Mohamed Hameed	Iraq	38.13	38.50	39.37	39.37	
—	Miguel de la Quadra-Salcedo	Spain	X	X	X	No mark	
—	Gideon Ariel	Israel	DNS				
—	Herbert Egermann	Austria	DNS				
—	Salem El-Jisr	Lebanon	DNS				

=== Final ===
Rank	Athlete	Nation	1	2	3	4	5	6	Distance	Notes
1st place, gold medalist(s)	Al Oerter	United States	57.64	56.73	56.53	56.73	59.18 OR	57.19	59.18	OR
2nd place, silver medalist(s)	Rink Babka	United States	58.02	58.02	56.14	54.93	57.52	57.41	58.02	
3rd place, bronze medalist(s)	Dick Cochran	United States	X	54.75	48.71	54.51	57.16	54.49	57.16	
4	József Szécsényi	Hungary	54.58	X	54.86	55.22	55.79	55.61	55.79	
5	Edmund Piątkowski	Poland	54.06	51.52	54.29	X	55.12	X	55.12	
6	Viktor Kompaniyets	Soviet Union	55.06	53.38	X	53.52	X	51.08	55.06	
7	Carmelo Rado	Italy	51.10	52.65	54.00	Did not advance			54.00	
8	Kim Bukhantsov	Soviet Union	52.42	52.59	53.61	Did not advance			53.61	
9	Pentti Repo	Finland	53.44	52.81	51.08	Did not advance			53.44	
10	Ferenc Klics	Hungary	50.10	51.61	53.37	Did not advance			53.37	
11	Stein Haugen	Norway	X	X	53.36	Did not advance			53.36	
12	Lothar Milde	United Team of Germany	52.22	51.26	53.33	Did not advance			53.33	
13	Zdeněk Čihák	Czechoslovakia	52.75	53.29	51.51	Did not advance			53.29	
14	Zenon Begier	Poland	51.67	50.93	53.18	Did not advance			53.18	
15	Vladimir Trusenyov	Soviet Union	52.16	51.98	52.93	Did not advance			52.93	
16	Manfred Grieser	United Team of Germany	52.17	52.11	52.69	Did not advance			52.69	
17	Adolfo Consolini	Italy	50.84	52.44	51.08	Did not advance			52.44	
18	Antonios Kounadis	Greece	52.42	X	50.56	Did not advance			52.42	
19	Zdeněk Němec	Czechoslovakia	52.05	49.44	52.14	Did not advance			52.14	
20	Todor Artarski	Bulgaria	49.14	52.12	X	Did not advance			52.12	
21	Warwick Selvey	Australia	X	49.34	X	Did not advance			49.34	
22	Cees Koch	Netherlands	X	49.21	X	Did not advance			49.21	
