= Masters M70 discus world record progression =

Masters M70 discus world record progression is the progression of world record improvements of the discus M70 division of Masters athletics. Records must be set in properly conducted, official competitions under the standing IAAF rules unless modified by World Masters Athletics. The M70 division consists of male athletes who have reached the age of 70 but have not yet reached the age of 75, so exactly from their 70th birthday to the day before their 75th birthday. The M70 division throws a 1 kg implement.

Key

Incomplete information Pending

Distance	Athlete	Nationality	Birthdate	Location	Date
55.27	Carmelo Rado	Italy	04.08.1933	Chiaro	25.09.2007
49.92	Veikko Ryyti	Finland	13.01.1935	Kiiminki	10.09.2005
49.34	Kauko Jouppila	Finland	03.03.1921	Hyvinkaa	21.09.1991
47.70	Olav Reppen	Norway	09.07.1911	Brønnøysund	11.09.1982
43.32	Osmo Renvall	Finland	10.11.1910		1982
43.26	José Luis Celaya	Spain	21.08.1910	Strassbourg	16.07.1982
