= Čihák =

Čihák (feminine: Čiháková) is a Czech surname. The word čihák referred to a blacksmith's tool, but the surname could also be derived from the words číhat ('to lurk') and čihadlo (a place to lie in wait for birds). Notable people with the surname include:

- Jaroslav Čihák (1891–1944), Czech military commander
- Josef Čihák (born 1963), Czech tennis player
- Miroslav Čihák (fl. 1950s), Czech canoeist
- Zdeněk Čihák (1933–2015), Czech athlete

== See also ==
- Marie Zdeňka Baborová-Čiháková (1877–1937), Czech botanist
