= Niemitz (disambiguation) =

Niemitz is a German-language surname.

Niemitz may also refer to:

- Niemica, Kamień County, a village in Poland formerly called Niemitz
- Niemica, Sławno County, a village in Poland formerly called Niemitz
- Niemica (river), a river in Poland formerly called Niemitz Bach (Niemitz Stream)

== See also ==
- Nimitz (disambiguation)
