= Masters M85 discus world record progression =

Masters M85 discus world record progression is the progression of world record improvements of the discus M85 division of Masters athletics. Records must be set in properly conducted, official competitions under the standing IAAF rules unless modified by World Masters Athletics. The M85 division consists of male athletes who have reached the age of 85 but have not yet reached the age of 90, so exactly from their 85th birthday to the day before their 90th birthday. The M85 division throws a 1 kg implement.

Key

Incomplete information Pending

Distance	Athlete	Nationality	Birthdate	Location	Date
35.92	Carmelo Rado	Italy	4 August 1933	Caorle	13 September 2019
35.09	Carmelo Rado	Italy	4 August 1933	Modena	29 September 2018
33.10	Kauko Jouppila	Finland	3 March 1921	Helsinki	20 May 2006
30.81	Ross Carter	United States	10 March 1914	Eugene	2 July 2000
28.02	Mario Riboni	Italy	13 June 1913	Cesenatico	11 September 1998
27.12	Lamberto Cicconi	Italy	7 November 1904	Cesenatico	12 September 1990
