= Nimitz =

Nimitz may refer to:

== People ==
- Chester W. Nimitz (1885–1966), American admiral
- Chester Nimitz Jr. (1915–2002), American submarine commander
- Jack Nimitz (1930–2009), American musician

== Named for Fleet Admiral Nimitz ==
- USS Nimitz (CVN-68), a U.S. Navy supercarrier
  - Nimitz-class aircraft carrier, a class of ten nuclear-powered aircraft carriers
  - USS Nimitz UFO incident, a 2004 unexplained aerial phenomenon
- Nimitz High School (Harris County, Texas), Houston, Texas
- Nimitz High School (Irving, Texas)
- Nimitz Elementary School, Sunnyvale, California
- Nimitz Freeway, a designation of Interstate 880 in the San Francisco Bay Area
- Nimitz Highway, a local name for Hawaii Route 92, a major east–west highway on the island of Oahu
- Nimitz, West Virginia
- Nimitz Glacier, an Antarctic glacier
- Nimitz Strike Group, a deployment of the U.S. Navy's Carrier Strike Group 11
- Admiral Nimitz Museum, a feature of the National Museum of the Pacific War in Fredericksburg, Texas
- Nimitz Class (novel), a 1997 naval thriller by Patrick Robinson
- Nimitz, the personal pet of the title character in David Weber's Honor Harrington military science fiction series

== Others ==
- 2C-T-17, a psychedelic drug

== See also ==
- Nimitz High School (disambiguation)
- Nimitz Hill (disambiguation)
- Niemitz (disambiguation)
- Nimtz
- Nemetz
