= Nemitz =

Nemitz is a German surname of Slavic origin that comes from a variation on the Slavic word Němec. Alternatively, it may be derived from any of places named "Nemitz". Notable people with the surname include:

- Anna Nemitz (1873–1962), German politician
- Margaret Ann Nemitz
- Nikki Nemitz
- Willi Nemitz

== See also ==
- Nemitz, a former name for Niemierzyn, a neighbourhood in Szczecin, Poland
