= Manfred Grieser =

German discus thrower

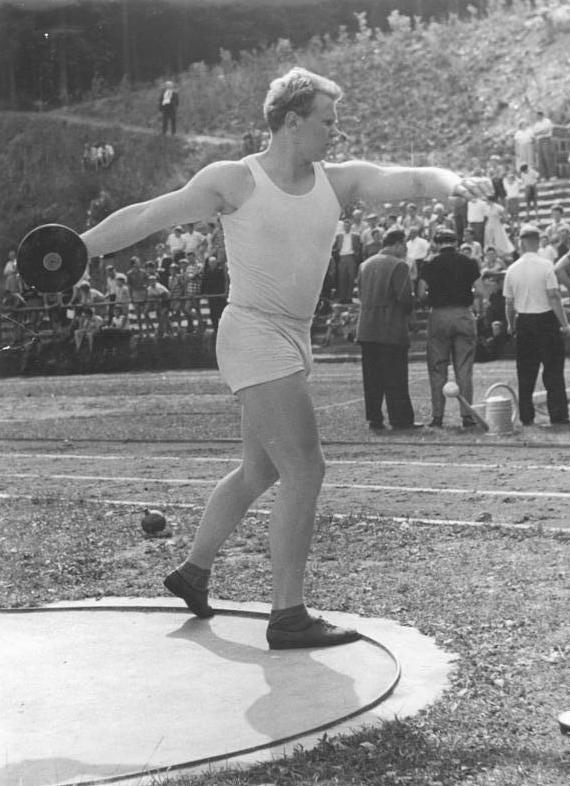
- Manfred Grieser in 1958

Personal information
- Nationality: German
- Born: 9 May 1938 (age 88)

Sport
- Sport: Athletics
- Event: Discus throw

Manfred Grieser (born 9 May 1938) is a German athlete. He competed in the men's discus throw at the 1960 Summer Olympics.
