= Nimtz =

Nimtz is a surname. Notable people with this surname include:

- F. Jay Nimtz (1915–1990), American politician
- Günter Nimtz (born 1936), German physicist

== See also ==
- Nimitz (disambiguation)
