= Dick Cochran =

American discus thrower

Personal information
- Full name: Richard Lee Cochran
- Born: June 23, 1938 (age 88) Brookfield, Missouri, U.S.
Medal record
Men's athletics
Representing United States
Olympic Games
Bronze medal – third place	1960 Rome	Discus throw

Richard Lee Cochran (born June 23, 1938) is a retired American track athlete.

He competed won the bronze medal at the 1960 Summer Olympics in Rome, behind fellow Americans Al Oerter and Rink Babka.

A native of Brookfield, Missouri, Cochran was on the University of Missouri track and field team. He won two NCAA discus championships in 1959 and 1960. He participated in the 1959 Pan American Games as well. Cochran won Big Eight Conference discus crowns in 1959 and '60, and achieved a track-and-field rarity in 1959, when he was a grand-slam winner in discus, claiming championships in the Texas, Kansas, and Drake Relays. Cochran continues to dominate in discus in the Senior Olympics into his 70s.
