= Němec =

Němec (Czech pronunciation: [ˈɲɛmɛts], feminine: Němcová (Czech pronunciation: [ˈɲɛmtsovaː])) and Nemec (feminine: Nemcová) are common Czech and Slovak surnames. It literally means 'German', but it also meant 'mute person' (figuratively "a person who does not speak (Slavic)", hence the name for Germans). It comes from Proto-Slavic *němьcь ('foreigner' or 'German') and from *němъ ('mute', Czech: němý, Slovak: nemý).

Notable people with the surname include:

== Němec ==
- Antonín Němec (1858–1926), Czech journalist and politician
- Božena Němcová (1820–1862), Czech writer
- Dana Němcová (1934–2023), Czech psychologist and dissident
- Eva Němcová (born 1972), Czech basketball player
- Jan Němec (1936–2016), Czech filmmaker
- Jiří Němec (born 1966), Czech footballer
- Jiřina Němcová (1937–2018), Czech athlete
- Kateřina Němcová (born 1990), Czech chess player
- Marie Němcová (born 2000), Czech canoeist
- Miroslava Němcová (born 1952), Czech politician
- Ondřej Němec (born 1984), Czech ice hockey player
- Pavlína Němcová (born 1972), Czech-born model and actress
- Petra Němcová (born 1979), Czech model
- Rudolf Němec (1936–2015), Czech artist
- Zdeněk Němec (1933–2014), Czech athlete

== Nemec ==
- Adam Nemec (born 1985), Slovak footballer
- André Nemec, American screenwriter
- Corin Nemec (born 1971), American actor
- David Nemec (born 1938), American baseball historian
- Dejan Nemec (born 1977), Slovenian footballer
- Horst Nemec (1939–1984), Austrian footballer
- Miroslav Nemec (born 1954), German actor
- Šimon Nemec (born 2004), Slovak ice hockey player
- Vernita Nemec (born 1942), American artist and arts activist
