= Zdeněk Čihák =

Czech discus thrower

Personal information
- Nationality: Czech
- Born: 9 February 1933 Prague, Czechoslovakia
- Died: 4 April 2015 (aged 82)

Sport
- Sport: Athletics
- Event: Discus throw

Zdeněk Čihák (9 February 1933 – 4 April 2015) was a Czech athlete. He competed in the men's discus throw at the 1960 Summer Olympics.
