= Zdeněk Němec =

Czech discus thrower (1933–2014)

Personal information
- Nationality: Czech
- Born: 3 February 1933 Zábřeh, Czechoslovakia
- Died: 29 January 2014 (aged 80) Prague, Czech Republic

Sport
- Sport: Athletics
- Event: Discus throw

Zdeněk Němec (3 February 1933 – 29 January 2014) was a Czech athlete. He competed in the men's discus throw at the 1960 Summer Olympics. He was a husband of Jiřina Němcová, a Czechoslovak athlete. Their daughter is Eva Horáková, a basketball player.
