= Kim Bukhantsov =

Soviet discus thrower (1931–2026)

Personal information
- Nationality: Soviet
- Born: 25 November 1931 Kazanskaya, North Caucasus Krai, Russian SFSR, Soviet Union
- Died: 29 March 2026 (aged 94)

Sport
- Sport: Athletics
- Event: Discus throw

Kim Ivanovich Bukhantsov (Russian: Ким Иванович Буханцов; 25 November 1931 – 29 March 2026) was a Soviet athlete. He competed in the men's discus throw at the 1956, 1960, and the 1964 Summer Olympics. Bukhantsov later coached Faina Melnik and Ehsan Hadadi.

Bukhantsov died on 29 March 2026, at the age of 94.
