= Nimitz High School =

Nimitz High School can refer to:

- Nimitz High School (Harris County, Texas)
- Nimitz High School (Irving, Texas)
