= Milan Vobořil =

Czech ice hockey player

- Born: July 6, 1977 (age 48)
- Height: 6 ft 1 in (185 cm)
- Weight: 198 lb (90 kg; 14 st 2 lb)
- Position: Defence
- Shot: Left
- Czech2 team Former teams: HC Slovan Ustecti Lvi; HC Plzeň; HC Litvínov
- NHL draft: Undrafted
- Playing career: 2001–2014

Milan Vobořil (born July 6, 1977) is a Czech professional ice hockey defenceman. He is currently playing with HC Slovan Ustecti Lvi of the Czech First League.

Voboril has played 182 games in the Czech Extraliga with HC Plzeň and HC Litvínov.

== Career statistics ==
			Regular season					Playoffs
Season	Team	League	GP	G	A	Pts	PIM	GP	G	A	Pts	PIM
1997–98	HC Hvězda Praha	Czech3	—	—	—	—	—	—	—	—	—	—
1998–99	HK Kaučuk Kralupy nad Vltavou	Czech2	35	1	1	2	—	—	—	—	—	—
1999–00	HC 99 TL Mělník	Czech2	39	6	5	11	20	8	1	1	2	4
2000–01	HC Slovan Ústí nad Labem	Czech2	46	0	10	10	22	—	—	—	—	—
2001–02	HC Plzeň	Czech	2	0	0	0	0	6	0	1	1	6
2001–02	SK Kadaň	Czech2	40	2	4	6	34	5	0	2	2	6
2002–03	HC Plzeň	Czech	38	2	6	8	18	—	—	—	—	—
2002–03	SK Kadaň	Czech2	4	0	1	1	2	—	—	—	—	—
2003–04	HC Plzeň	Czech	24	0	3	3	26	—	—	—	—	—
2003–04	SK Kadaň	Czech2	18	5	3	8	14	—	—	—	—	—
2004–05	SK Kadaň	Czech2	52	9	15	24	36	—	—	—	—	—
2005–06	HC Plzeň	Czech	22	1	2	3	42	—	—	—	—	—
2005–06	SK Kadaň	Czech2	33	6	8	14	52	—	—	—	—	—
2006–07	HC Plzeň	Czech	10	0	0	0	8	—	—	—	—	—
2007–08	HC Litvínov	Czech	51	3	1	4	36	5	0	0	0	0
2008–09	HC Litvínov	Czech	35	0	2	2	12	4	0	0	0	2
2008–09	HC Most	Czech2	2	0	0	0	0	—	—	—	—	—
2009–10	HC Slovan Ústečtí Lvi	Czech2	34	1	8	9	20	6	0	2	2	4
2010–11	HC Slovan Ústečtí Lvi	Czech2	3	0	0	0	0	12	1	1	2	6
2010–11	HC Stadion Litoměřice	Czech2	41	7	12	19	34	—	—	—	—	—
2011–12	HC Slovan Ústečtí Lvi	Czech2	16	1	4	5	16	6	0	2	2	2
2011–12	HC Stadion Litoměřice	Czech2	25	1	4	5	22	—	—	—	—	—
2012–13	HC Slovan Ústečtí Lvi	Czech2	32	1	3	4	22	8	0	0	0	4
2012–13	Královští lvi Hradec Králové	Czech2	9	0	1	1	4	—	—	—	—	—
2013–14	HC Slovan Ústečtí Lvi	Czech2	39	3	10	13	52	—	—	—	—	—
Czech totals			182	6	14	20	142	15	0	1	1	8
Czech2 totals			468	43	89	132	350	45	2	8	10	26
