= Rudolf Němec =

Czech painter, poet and sculptor (1936–2015)

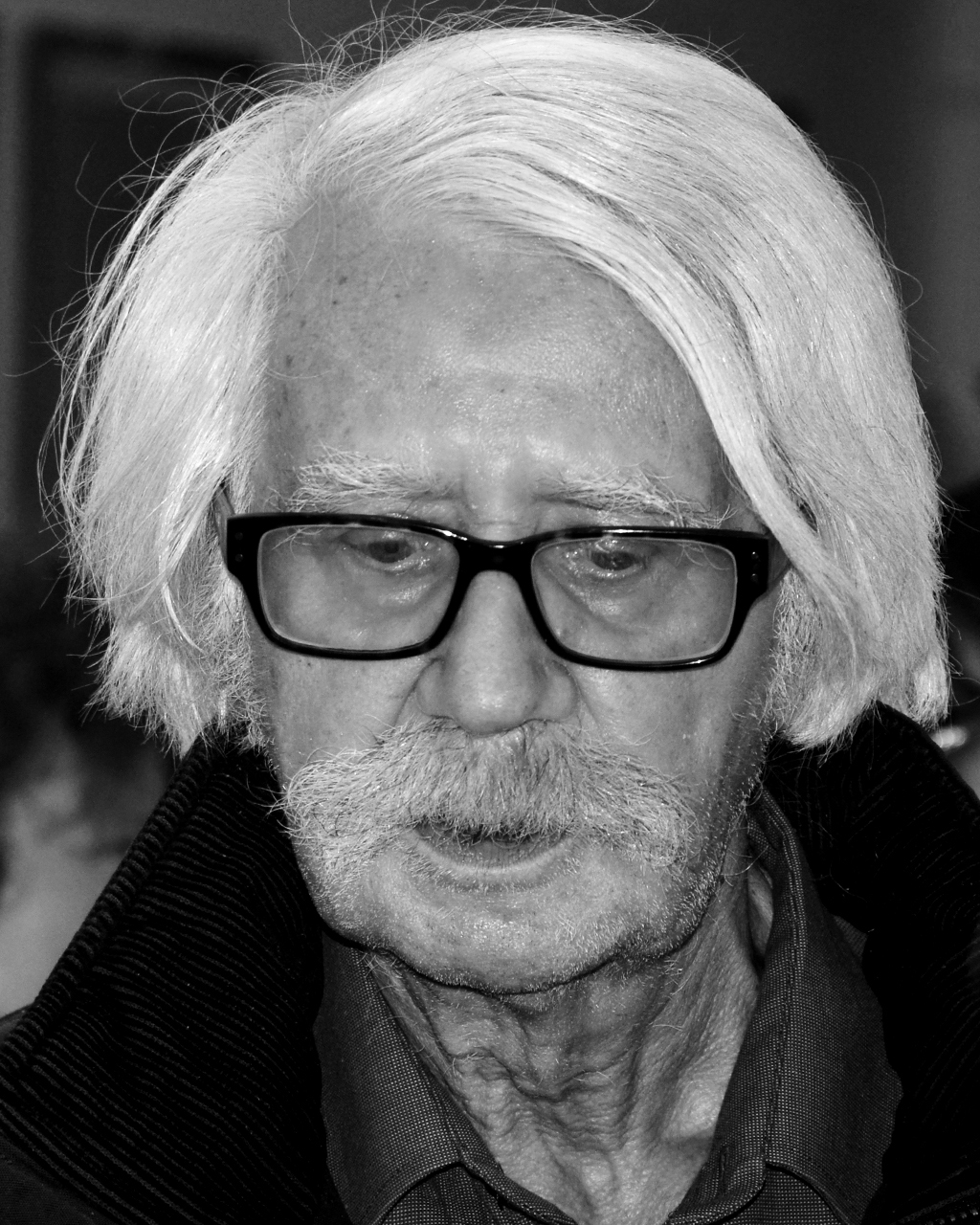
- Rudolf Němec (2013)
- Born: 19 May 1936; Prague
- Died: 12 March 2015 (aged 78); Prague
- Education: Academy of Fine Arts, Prague
- Known for: printmaker, painter, sculptor, poet

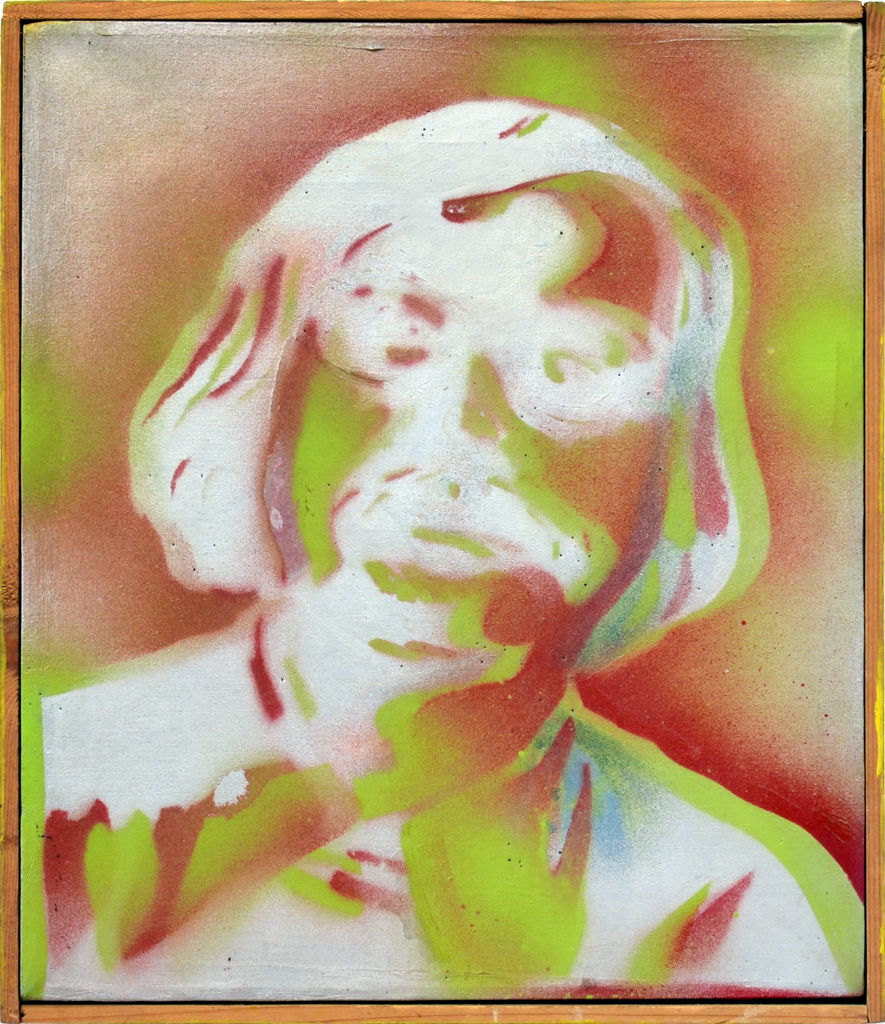
Rudolf Němec, Silver self-portrait (1982), email, oil, canvas

Rudolf Němec (19 May 1936 Prague - 12 March 2015 Prague) was a Czech painter, printmaker, poet and sculptor. He was one of the leading representatives of the New Figuration in Czechoslovakia.

== Life ==
Rudolf Němec spent his youth and the Second World War in Roztoky near Prague and in Skuteč. After the war, he completed one year at the Real Gymnasium in Prague and after the reorganisation of education he studied at the Higher School of Graphic Arts. After the division of the school, he completed his secondary studies at the Higher School of Housing Industry in the department of applied painting. In 1955 he was admitted to the Academy of Arts and Crafts in Prague to the studio of prof. Antonín Strnadel. He finished his studies in 1961 with a set of graphic works for the Museum in Roztoky. After completing the compulsory military service, he worked in a small studio on Komenský náměstí in Žižkov.

In 1964, he visited the exhibition of Pop art (Pop etc.) at the Museum of 20th Century Art (Museum des XX. Jahrhunderts) in Vienna, which significantly influenced his further work. In the mid-1960s (1965–67) he was employed for two years as an artist at the Cultural House of Transport Enterprises in Prague. At that time, the Václav Špála Gallery also hosted the first exhibition of foreign artists associated with the New Figuration.

Rudolf Němec exhibited regularly from 1965 at collective exhibitions of young artists. In 1968 he had his first solo exhibition at the Václav Špála Gallery, realised his film script for an experimental film and visited Paris in the same year. After the Warsaw Pact invasion of Czechoslovakia, together with Jiří Načeradský, he went to Paris and later to Caen in Normandy, where he received a scholarship. Together with several other Czech artists, they waited for the Ford Foundation scholarship and planned a trip to the United States. When the scholarship was finally not awarded and most of his friends returned to Prague, Rudolf Němec travelled to London and after a few months returned to Prague in 1969.

In 1971, he participated in the exhibition Confrontation at the Nová síň Gallery, which was subsequently banned. In the 1970s and 1980s, he belonged to the inner circle of the Križovnická school of pure humour without jokes. (Note: The Křižovnická school of pure humour without jokes was an informal pub association of young artists, musicians and writers that met in the now defunct restaurant U Křižovníků in the Prague Old Town. Among its members were: the directors - draughtsman and author of conceptual actions Jan Steklík and sculptor Karel Nepraš, painters Zdeněk Beran, Rudolf Němec, Zbyšek Sion, Otakar Slavík, Antonín Tomalík, graphic artist Naděžda Plíšková, poet and conceptualist Eugen Brikcius, art theoreticians Věra Jirousová and Ivan Martin Jirous, experimental poets Josef Procházka and Vladimír Burda. For the members of Křižovnická school and their friends, collective action was a reliable form of defence. The works created at the time of the greatest flowering of this association, as if on the outskirts of general interest, are today among the values of Czech modern art.)

At the beginning of normalization, like many other artists, he made a living restoring monuments (1972, the Holy Hill at Hostýn). He could only exhibit in galleries outside of Prague (Mělník, 1977, Brno, 1981, Liberec, 1986) and only in 1987 did he reintroduce himself to Prague with exhibitions at the Gallery of the Čapek Brothers and the Small Gallery of the Czechoslovak Writers. His first extensive retrospective was held three years after the fall of communist regime in 1993 at the Czech Museum of Fine Arts in Prague. Rudolf Němec lived and worked in Prague and Mladostov.

== Work ==
=== Early paintings and illustrations ===
As a student of Applied Graphic Art at the Academy of Arts and Crafts in Prague he was engaged in landscape painting and graduated with a set of graphic works for the Museum in Roztoky. At the same time, during his studies, he illustrated a book of poems by Zbyněk Hejda, Všechna slast, which was published in 1964. In his free work he tended towards abstraction. His work from the early 1960s survives only in fragments. Most of his works from the 1960s were lost from his studio in Žižkov during Němec's stay in France and during his hospitalizations, or were destroyed.

=== Imprints ===
T. Jindrová (2011) gives a very detailed account of the origins of his work and an analysis of his work from the 1960s onwards in her diploma thesis. The exhibition Pop etc in Vienna, which was an impulse for the Czech creators of New Figuration, is cited by Němec as fundamental and groundbreaking for his later work. Jindrová, unlike other authors, correctly analyses the cumulative influences of the exhibited works on Němec's later work and, in addition to the traditionally cited method of anthropometry by Yves Klein and Antonio Recalcati, she mentions in particular Andy Warhol, Roy Lichtenstein, Francis Bacon, César and Jorge de la Vega.

In the mid-1960s Rudolf Nemec began experimenting with imprints of his own figure and later of models in enamel paint on canvas. Although he used similar formal devices to Klein and Recalcati, this is not Klein's "painting with a live brush", as the result shows fundamental differences in meaning and quality.

The negative imprint of the human figure in a position that evokes physical suffering (In Depression, 1964, Before the Execution, 1966, Autopsy, 1978) is an expression of existential anxiety. The imprint here is a record of a mental state of heightened sensibility through psychophysical action. The dark colour palette with a predominance of blue and the inorganic geometric shapes in the painting, replacing the head of the figure, correspond with this. ("I hurt myself against the protrusions, blood drips over the frames of the paintings, everything heals back to purity"). Jindřich Chalupecký also points to the extreme consequence of the imprint of the human body in a work of art - not a mere representation, but a visible and unmediated presence.

Němec's imprints are not flat, but achieve spatial depth and a smooth transition of colour intensity from the lighter underpainting to the rich shades of blue and purple on the rest of the surface. Additional interventions were limited to the completion of the coloured background with brushwork, impressions of objects and splattered rasters. Nemec continually varied the technique and experimented with new methods - for example, combining it with a print from a photographic portrait (Pit, 1967), or by colouring prints of a face smeared with Arabic gum (Figure I-III, 1966).

In the 1970s, he returned to the technique temporarily in a series of original sheets on which he printed his face wrapped in dyed fabric or plastic (Looking into the Violet Glow, 1976–77). Also, the series of huddled figures that appear in Němec's work until the 1990s are an introverted reflection on loneliness and the need to seek safety ("Huddled Solitudes I imprint on canvas, I return to my mood again - to nature, quenched by thirst, by arid landscape I fade away").

At the end of the 1960s, when the atmosphere in society had relaxed, the impulses and starting points of Němec's work partially changed, and the method of imprinting was used to create the paintings Dance of a Young Man (1967), Dance (1968), Sitting (1967). In addition to the imprint, Němec also used painting and especially spraying paint over various stencils and rasters, which became a dominant feature of his work from the 1970s onwards.

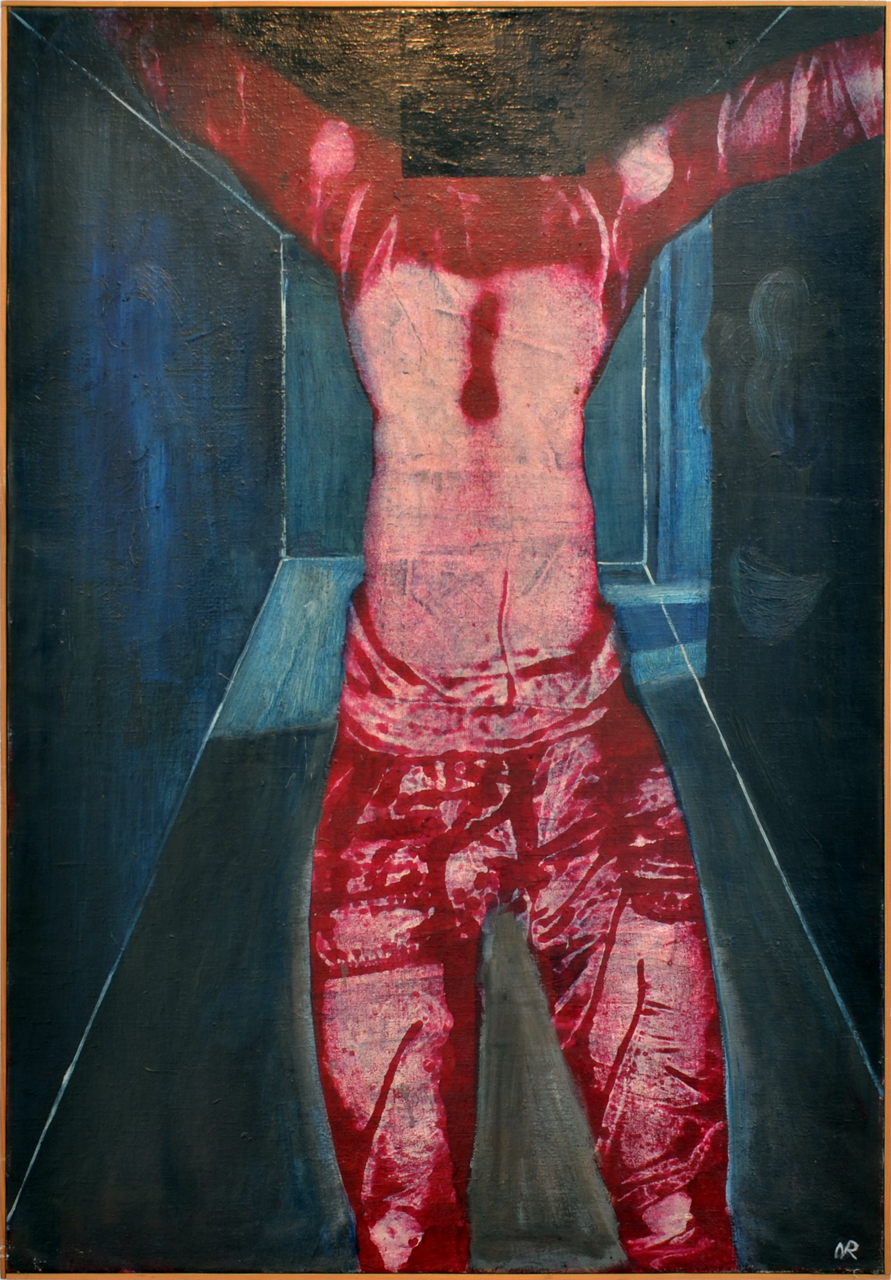
In Depression, 1964, Regional Gallery Liberec

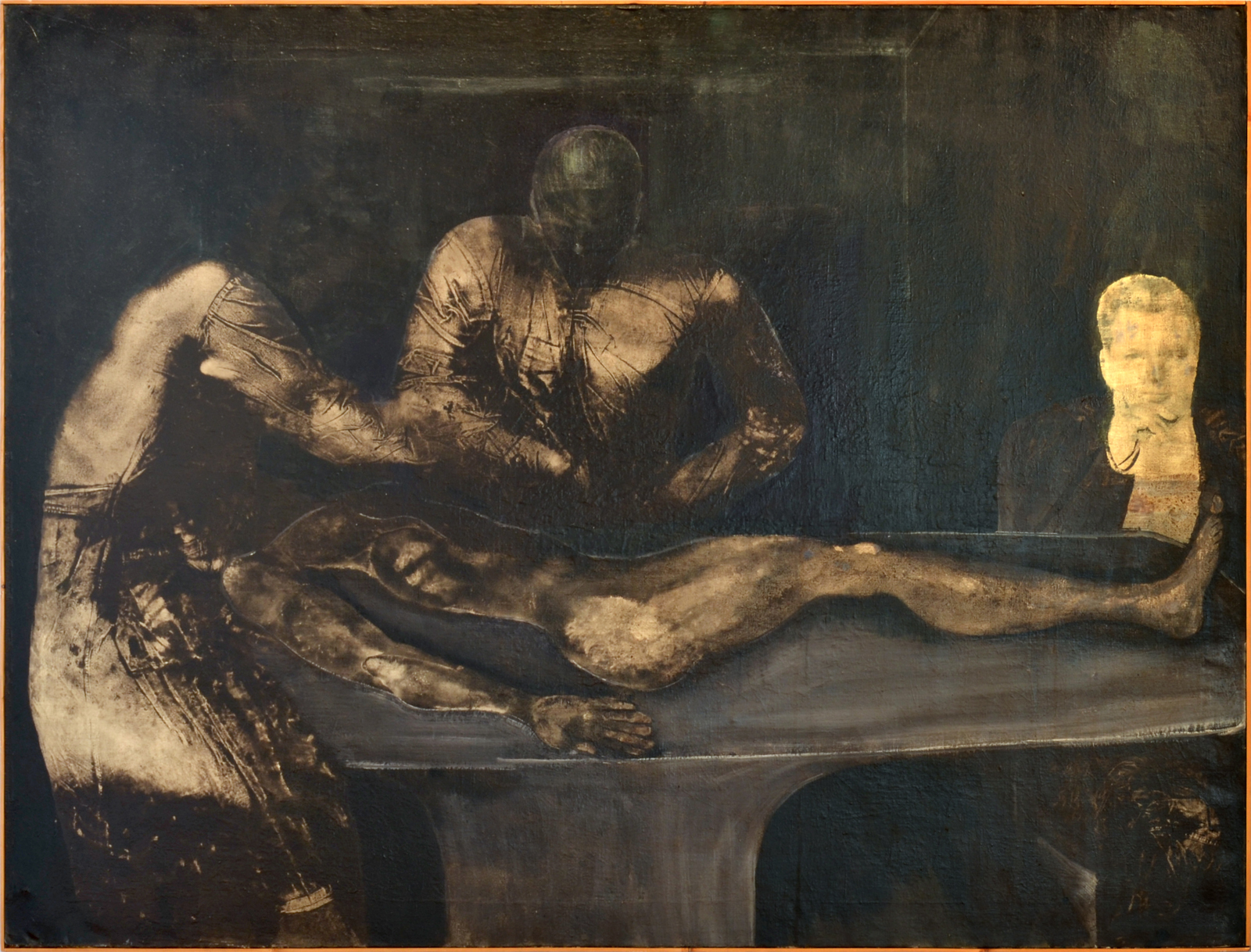
An Autopsy, 1967, North Bohemian Gallery of Fine Arts in Litoměřice

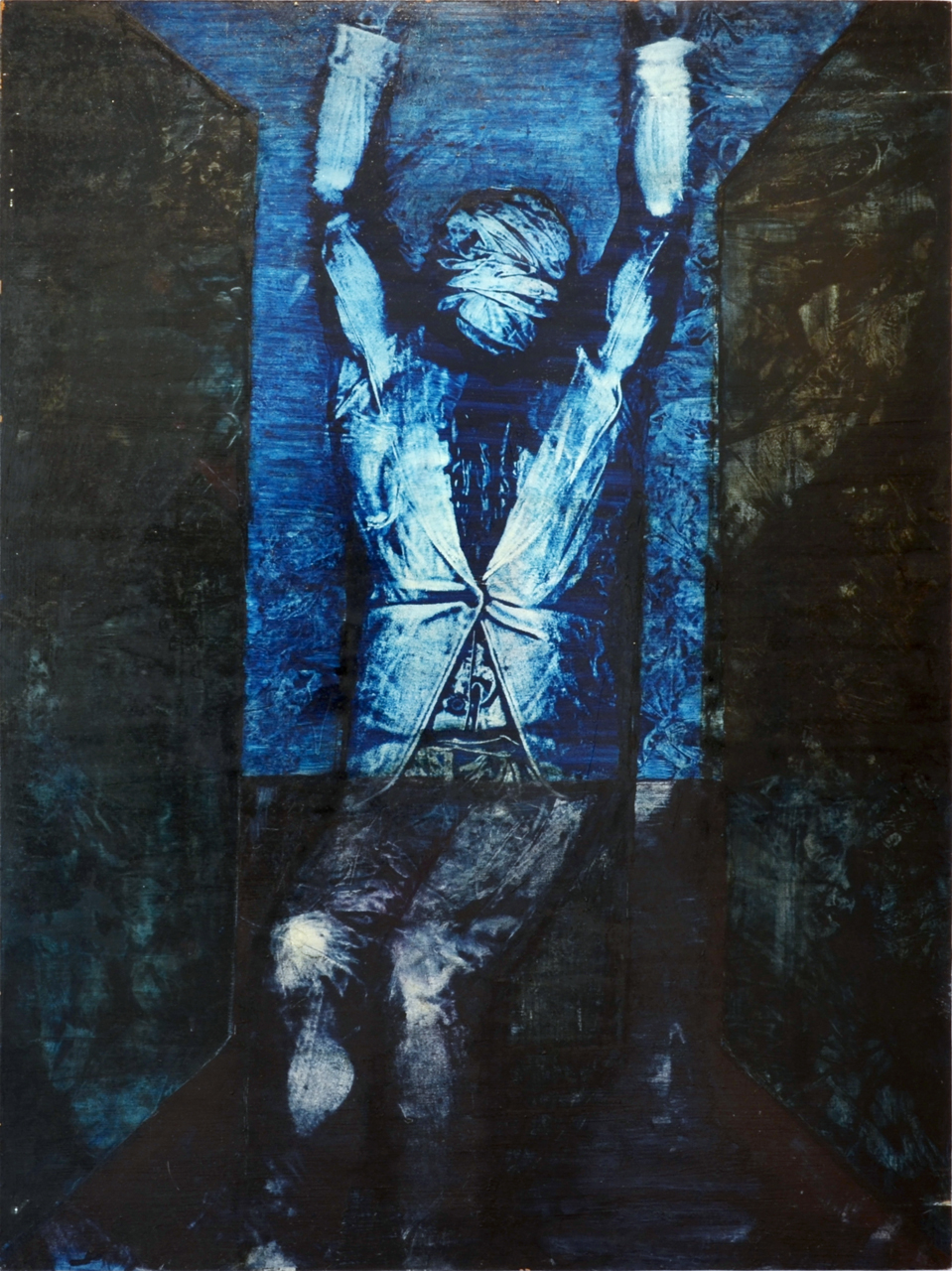
Sitting, 1967, National gallery Prague

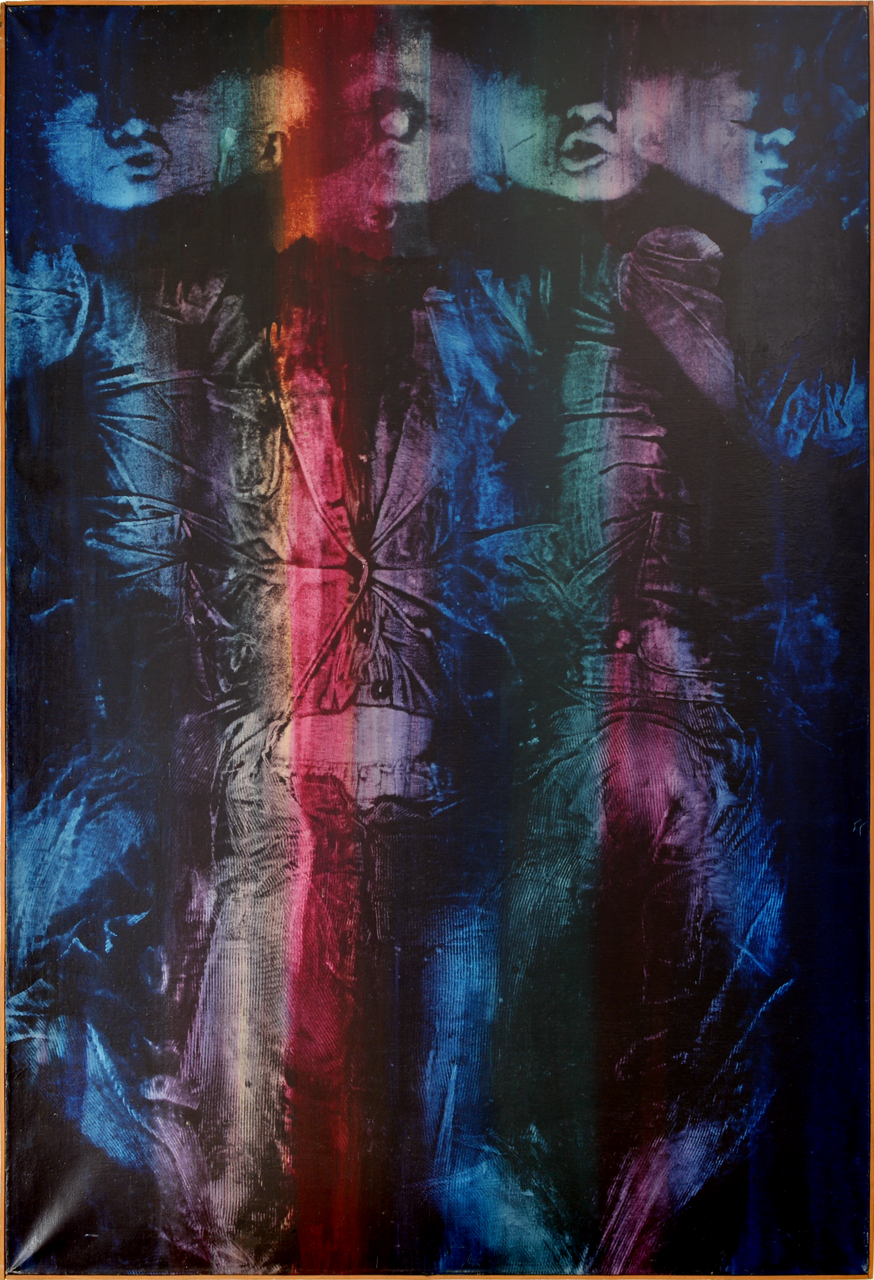
Dance of a Young Man (1967), Gallery of Modern Art Roudnice nad Labem

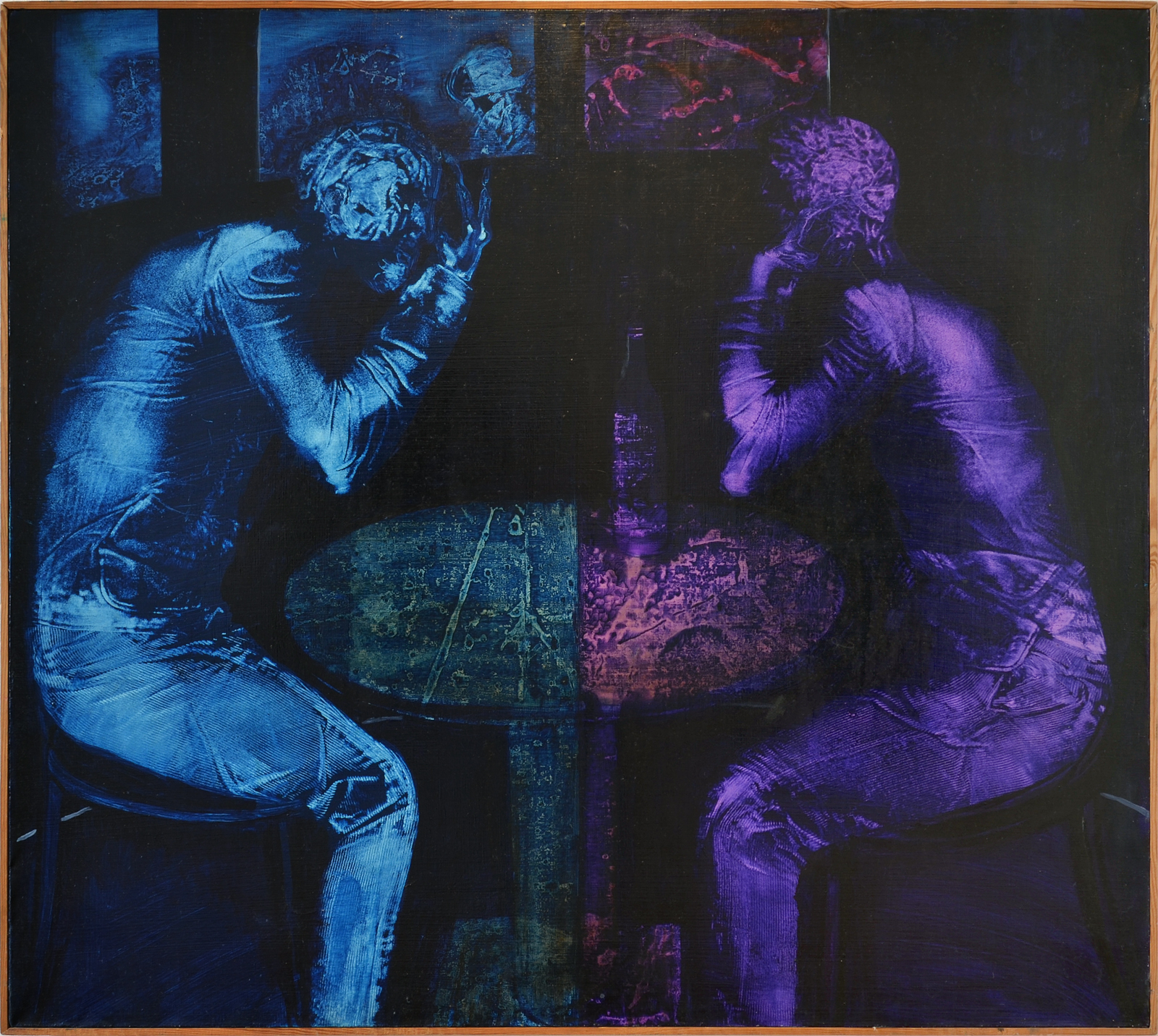
Interview, undated, Aleš South Bohemian Gallery in Hluboká nad Vltavou

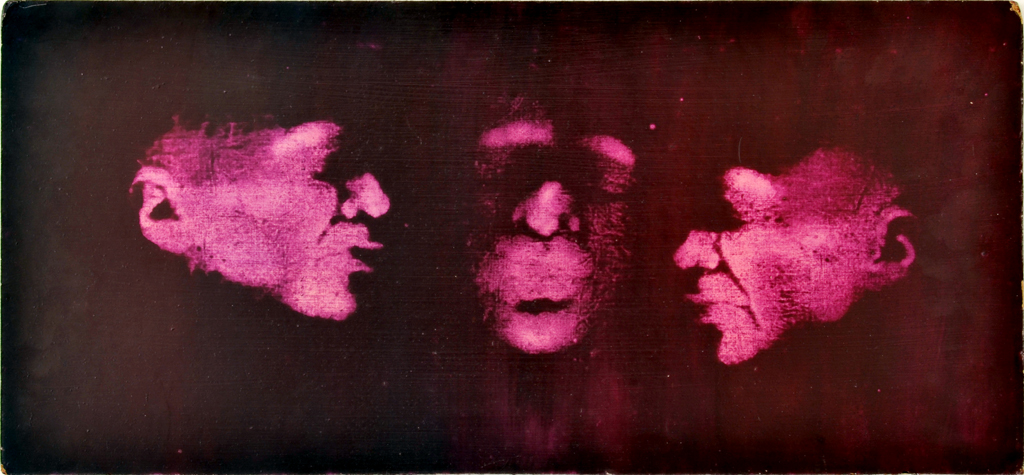
I dedicate my head to my friend Míla (1966–67)

=== Décalques and related works ===
From the 1970s Rudolf Němec devoted himself to the method of décalques, combined with stencil drawing and painting. The resulting image is created as a negative drawing on a ground covered with ink and oil paint. The drawing is marked by imprinting stencils and tracing them over an attached cotton canvas (Nude by the Water, 1974). The canvases are dominated by muted colour tones, which are partly determined by the technique used. The subjects of the paintings are meditative - the central object is usually a female body, sometimes curled up or placed in a wrapper symbolizing an egg or womb. The rest of the surface is filled with imprints of objects that create regular grids or impersonal technical space surrounding the figure. It is also clear from the artist's texts that the change is probably related to his renewed interest in drawing at the time.

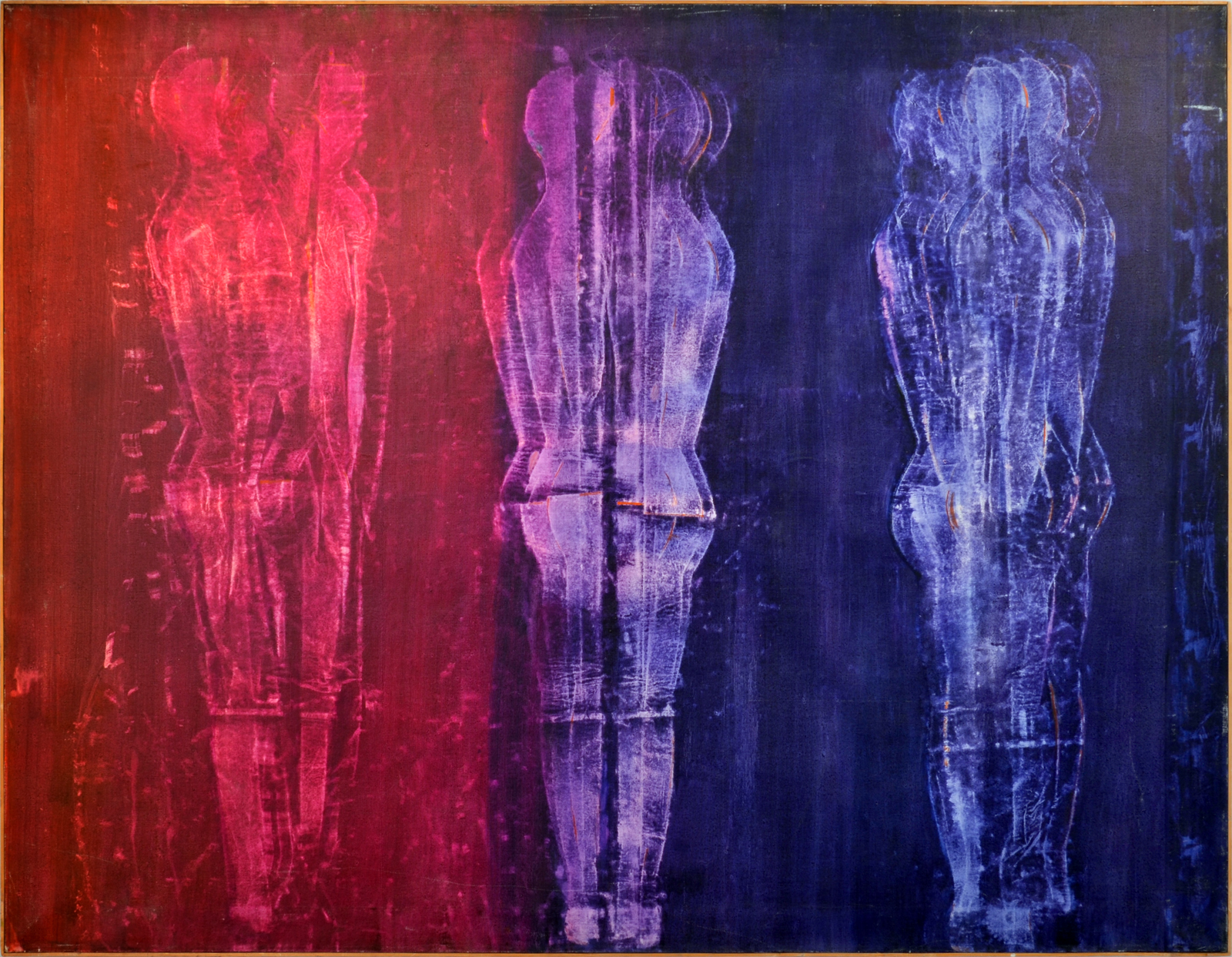
Musicians, 1970, private collection

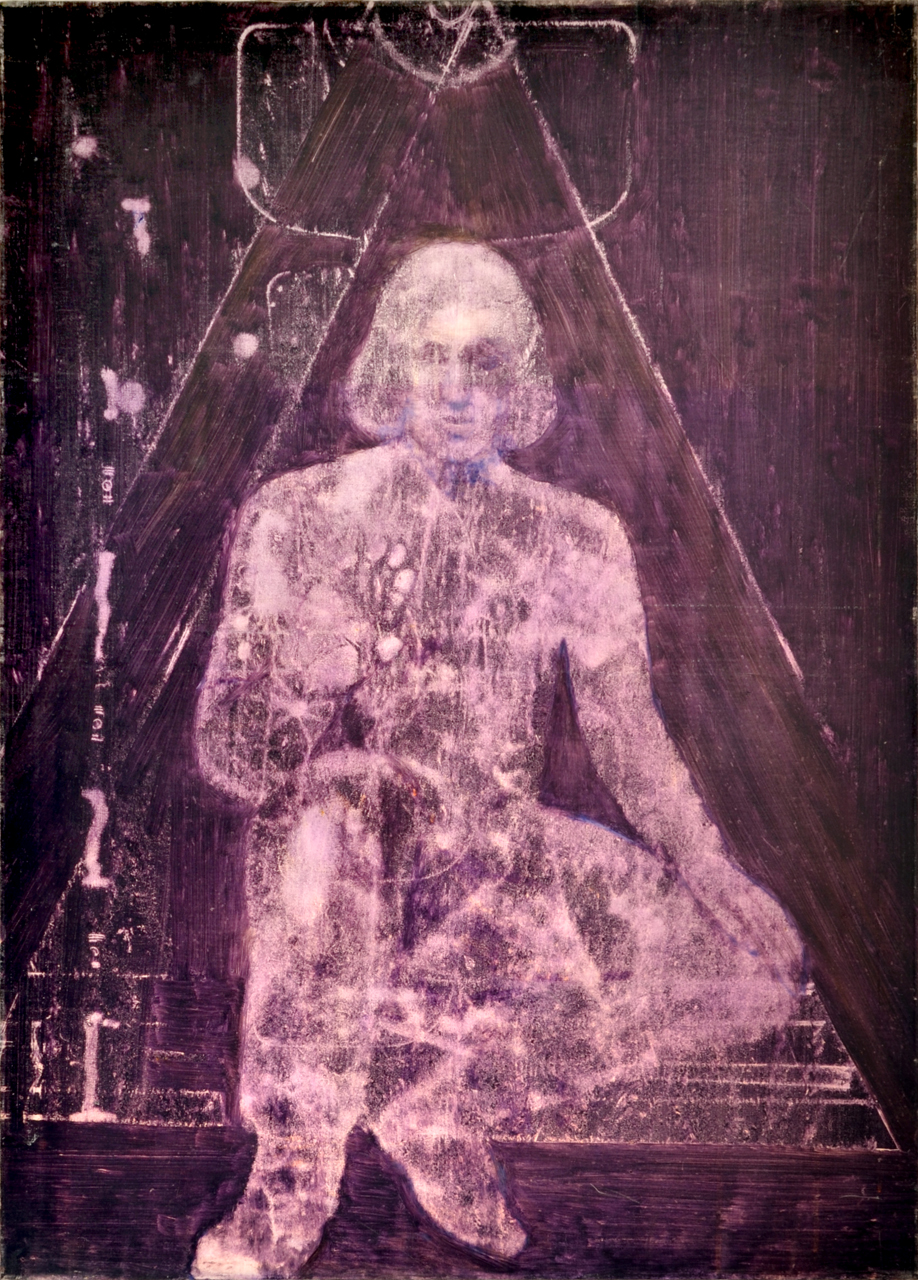
Sitting Figure (1972)

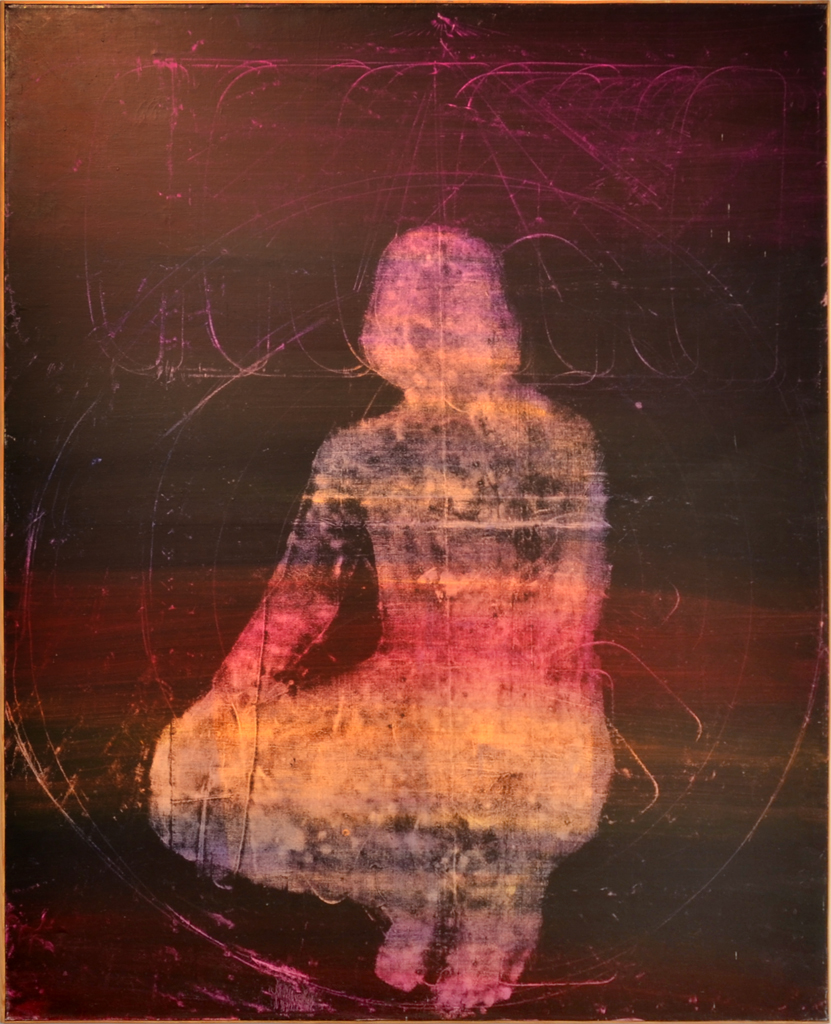
Figure with a Rainbow, 1973, Aleš South Bohemian Gallery in Hluboká nad Vltavou

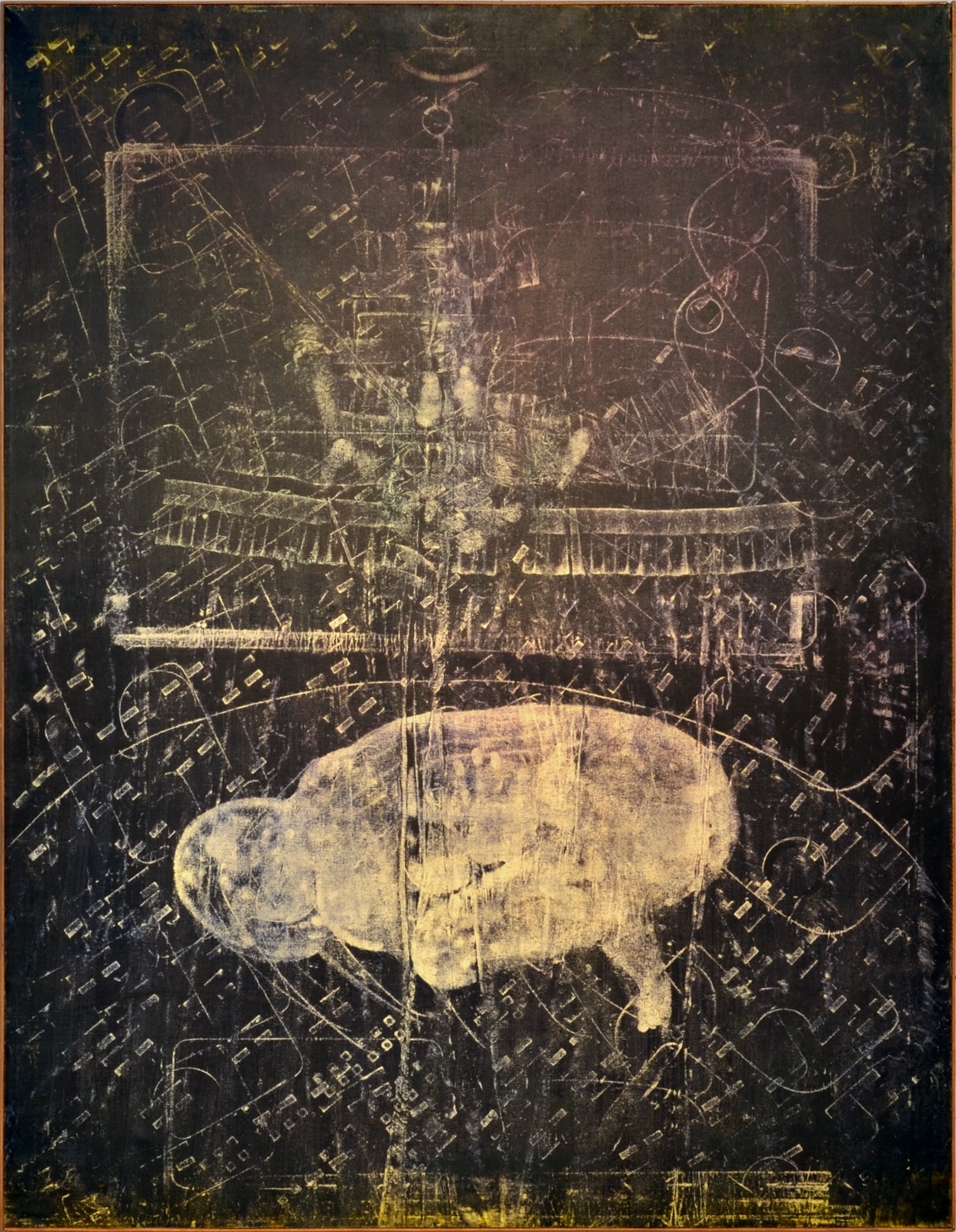
Hunched over, 1974, private collection

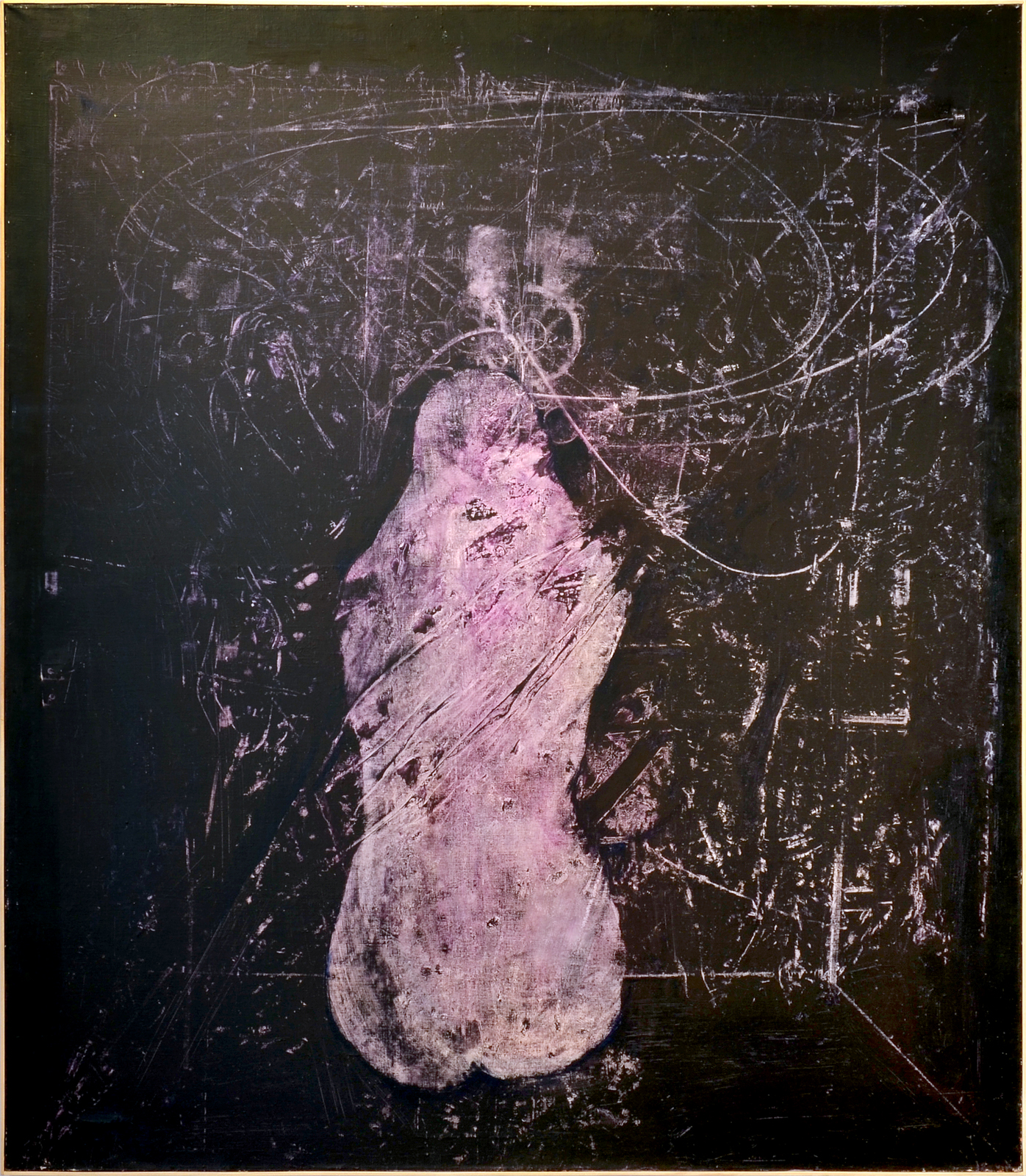
Draped Nude, 1974–1975, Terezín Memorial

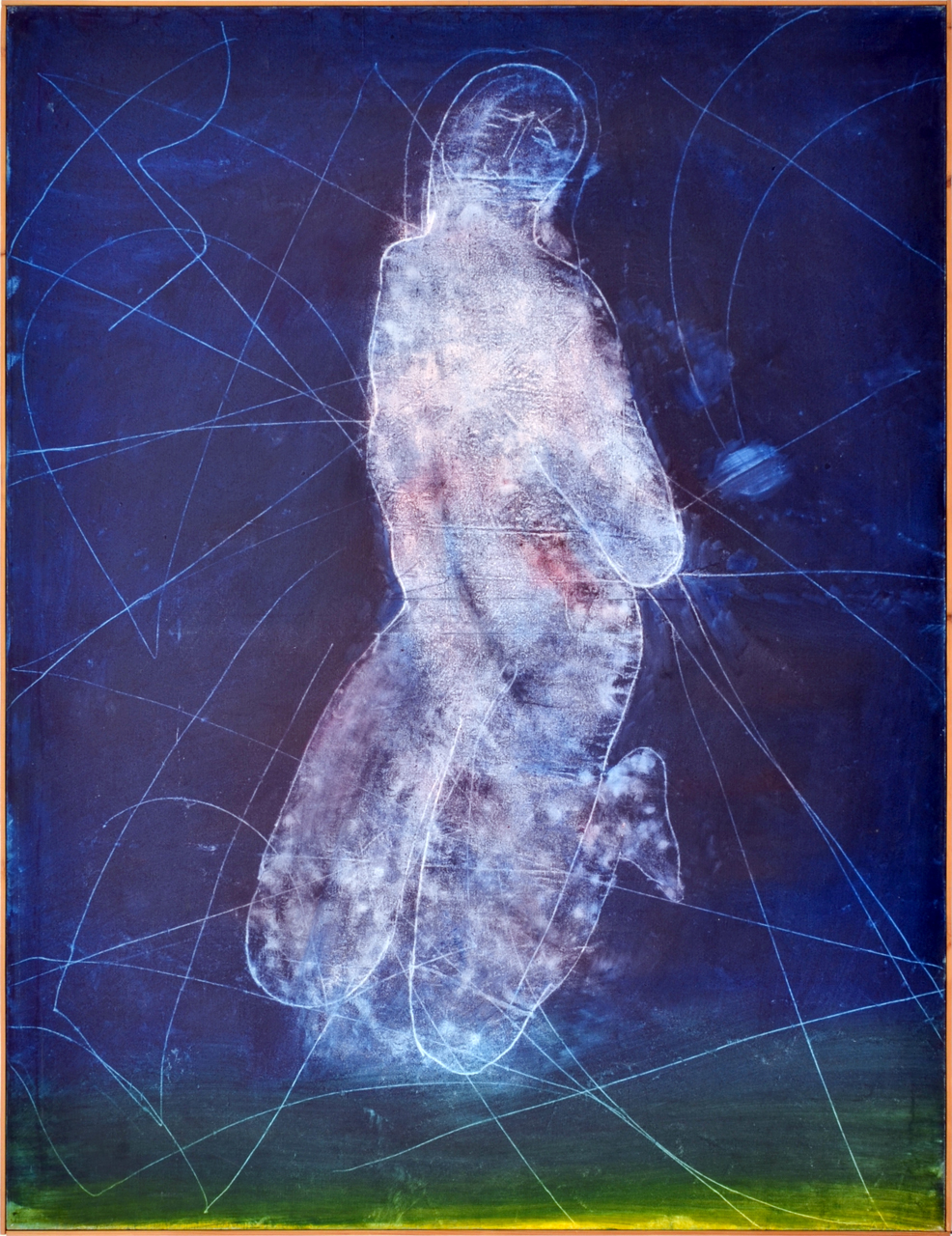
The Suffering of Saint Sebastian (1978)

The works on paper build on earlier figurative compositions from the 1960s, were created using impressions of objects and rasters. The artist used this technique with various variations (stamps, letters, reliefs, technical rasters) until the 1980s. The décalques on paper were created using the same method as the paintings or by imprinting the cotton fabric used earlier in the creation of the painting.

A different line of work is represented by a series of fantasy landscapes (Dream of the Sea, 1977) from the late 1970s, created as pen drawings, zinc prints, offset prints or lithographs (Landscape on a Dump, 1977) and watercolours with negative wax chalk drawings from the late 1970s (Seascapes, 1979).

=== Spray paintings ===
From the second half of the 1970s, Rudolf Němec began to use raster and cut-out stencils of figures and objects, over which he sprayed paint onto the canvas, first with an ordinary marker and from the late 1980s also using a spray gun. This allowed him to achieve more subtle colour transitions.

Rasters have significance in a painting not only as an artistic element, but also as a reference to the civilisational environment in which the figures are set. The bars may also refer prosaically to the prison where the author addressed his poem dedicated to Magor or reflect Rudolf Němec's depressing experiences during his hospitalization in the Psychiatric hospital in Bohnice. (Those bars are robbing my brain... Empty in my head).

The change in technique is also related to the colour scheme. Němec uses acrylic oil and enamel in bright tones for underpainting and in other sprayed layers. Templates of female figures cut from enlarged photographs, (The Wounded, 1986), as well as familiar motifs such as Manet's Olympia (Remembrance of Olympia, 1984), serve as silhouettes.

By shifting the template while spraying paint and shading the outline, he creates the appearance of movement and achieves greater optical depth. In some paintings, the principle of positive-negative is used (Double Perception, 1985).

A series of Němec's appropriations of well-known works such as the Mona Lisa or the trio of figures from The Luncheon on the Grass are related to the postmodern tendencies of the 1980s. It is actually a multiple appropriation, as it uses the method of repeating a pictorial motif in different colours typical of Andy Warhol. The painting Bar in Red (1984–85) uses a dot grid referring to Roy Lichtenstein. The same technique - spraying paint over stencils cut from enlarged photographs - was also used to create some landscapes, first in the 1970s (City, 1976) and then again around 1985 (Landscape with Bridge, 1985).

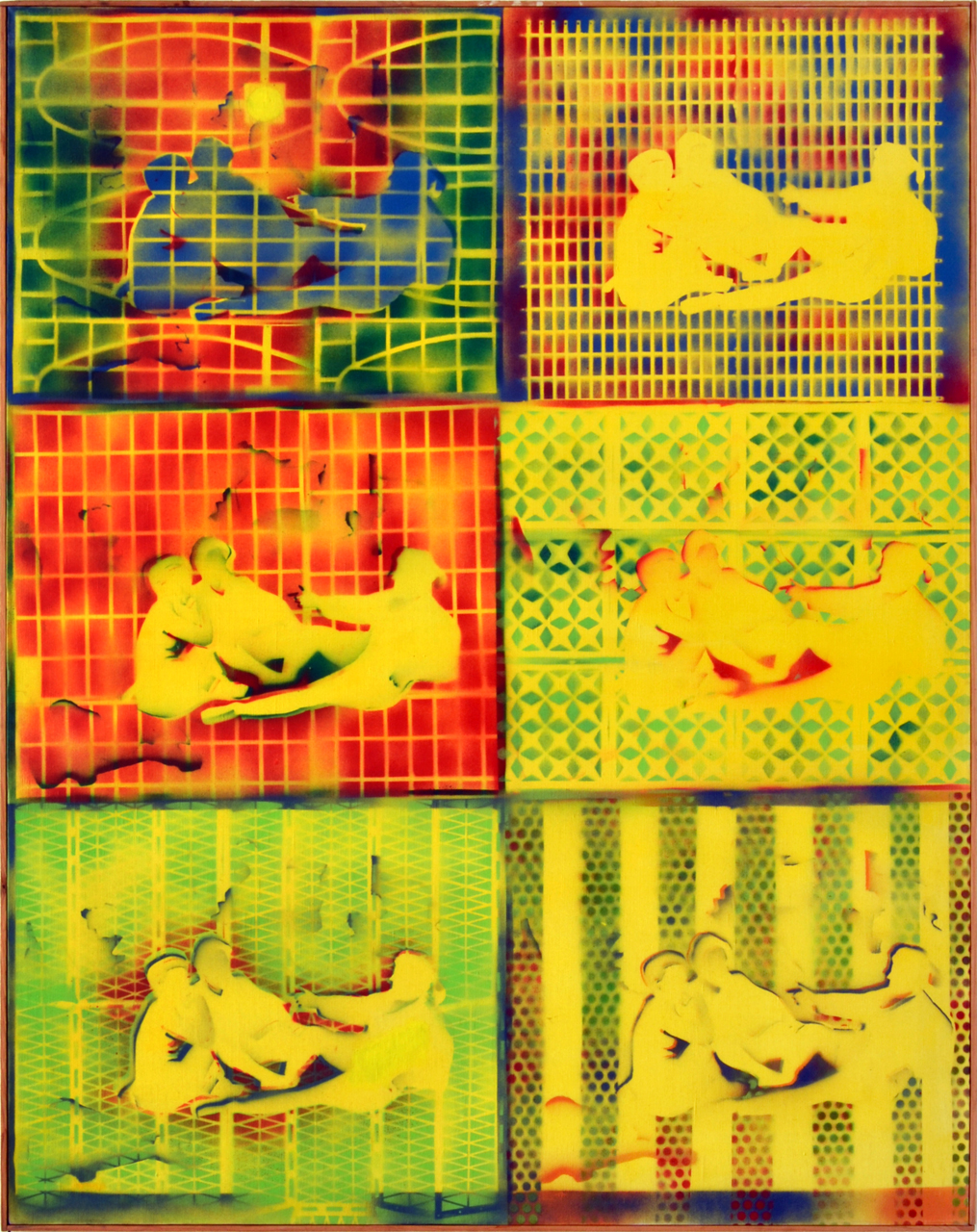
Remembrance of Manet (1983)

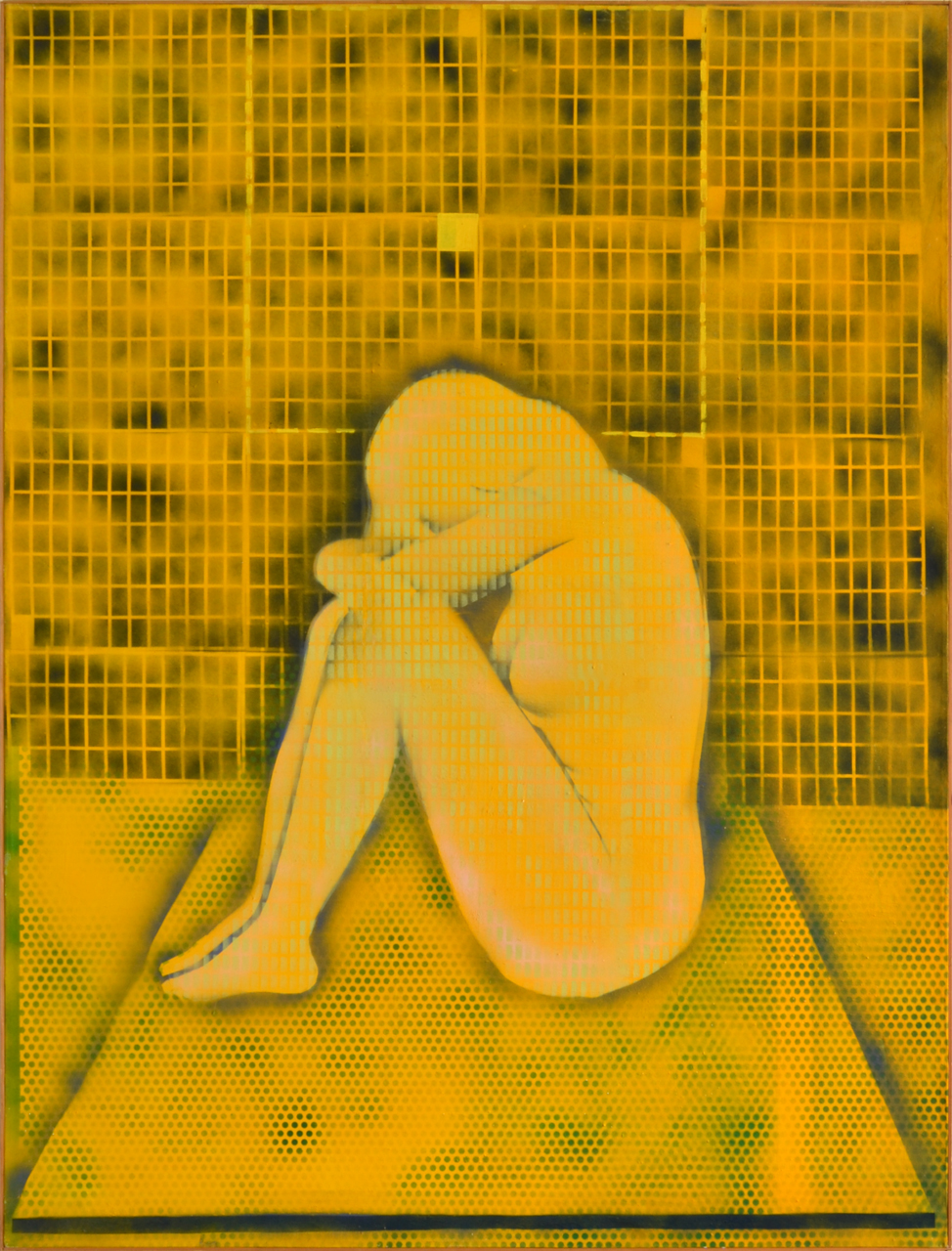
Thoughtful (1985)

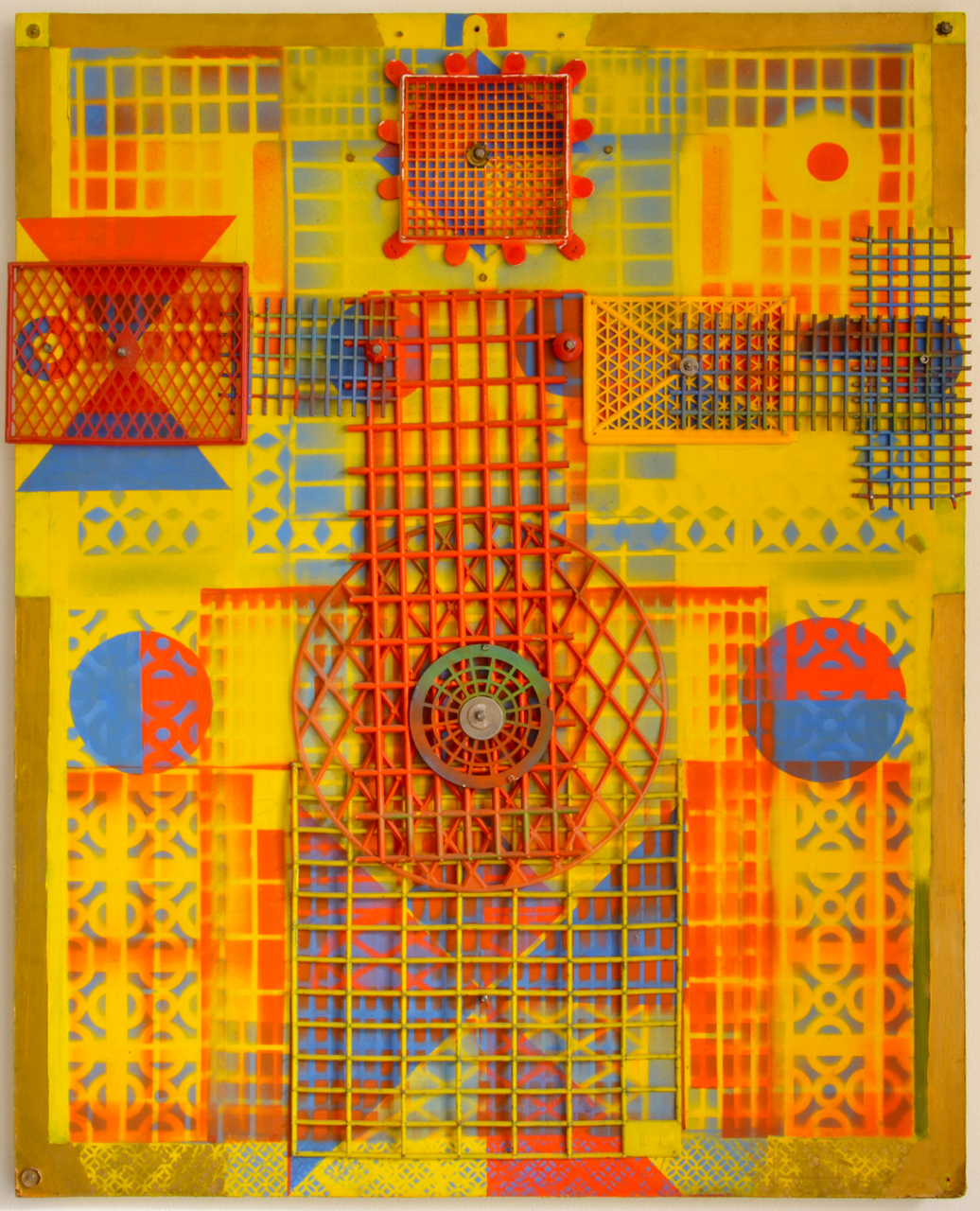
Big Little Queen (1987)

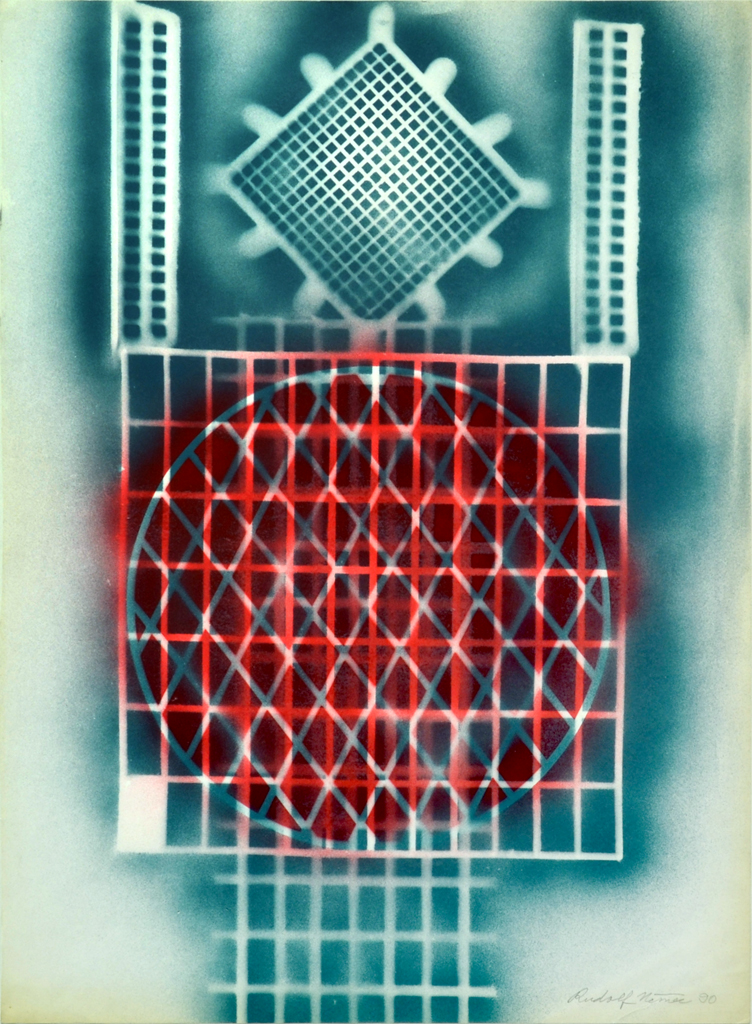
Untitled (1990)

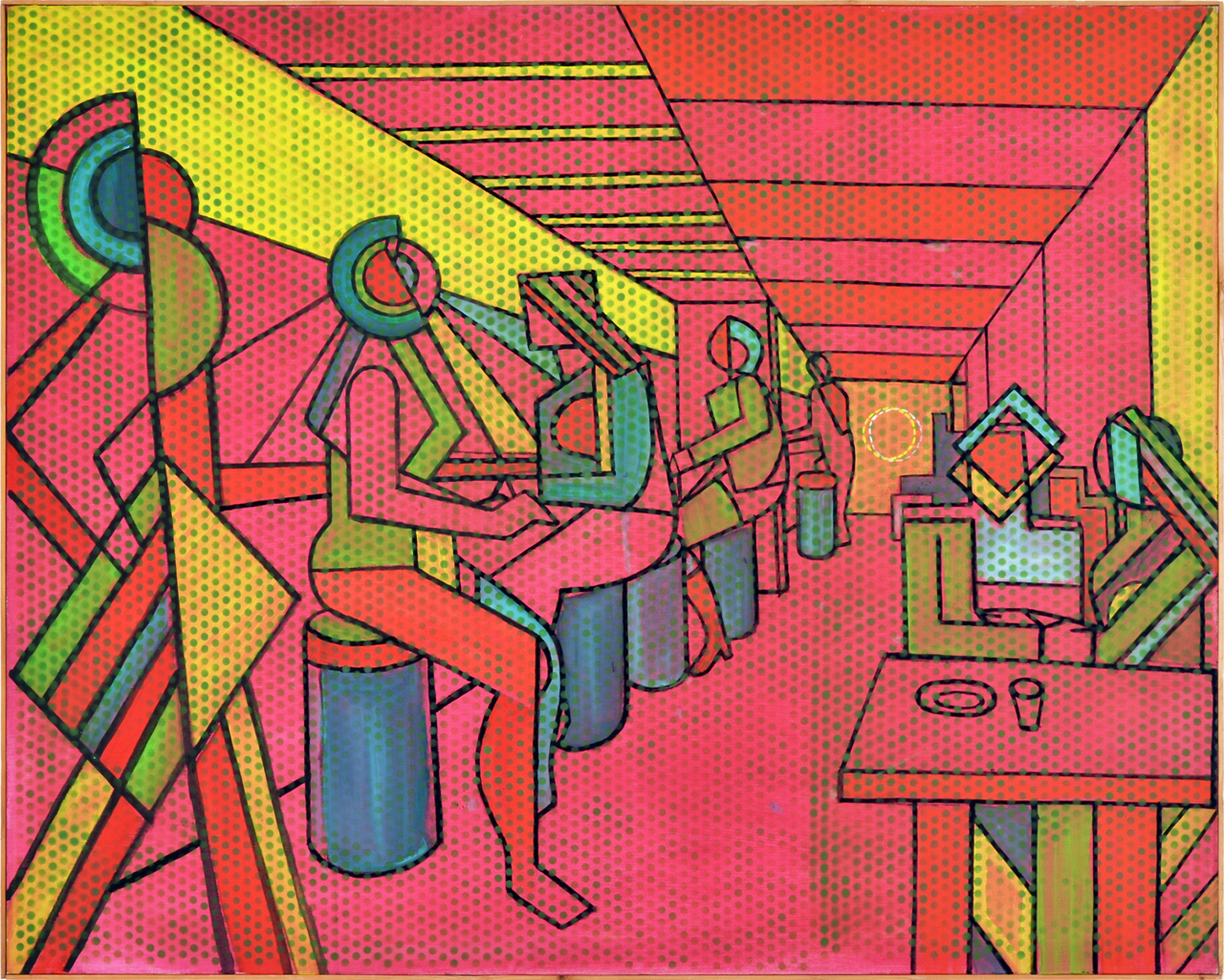
Red Bar (1984–85), acryl, email, oil, canvas

=== Abstract figures, silhouettes, graphic sheets, objects ===
Working with rasters in the 1970s, Němec took a natural route to an abstract figure composed of repeating signs (Robot, 1973) or a figure partially reduced to geometric elements (Musicians, 1976).

In the 1980s, he created totemized abstract figures by composing multi-colored rasters (Totemic Queen, 1987), and some of the titles of his paintings refer directly to primitive art (The Great Chief, 1987). Since the second half of the 1970s, Nemec has been composing three-dimensional objects from found objects as well as from rasters and stencils used in spray painting.

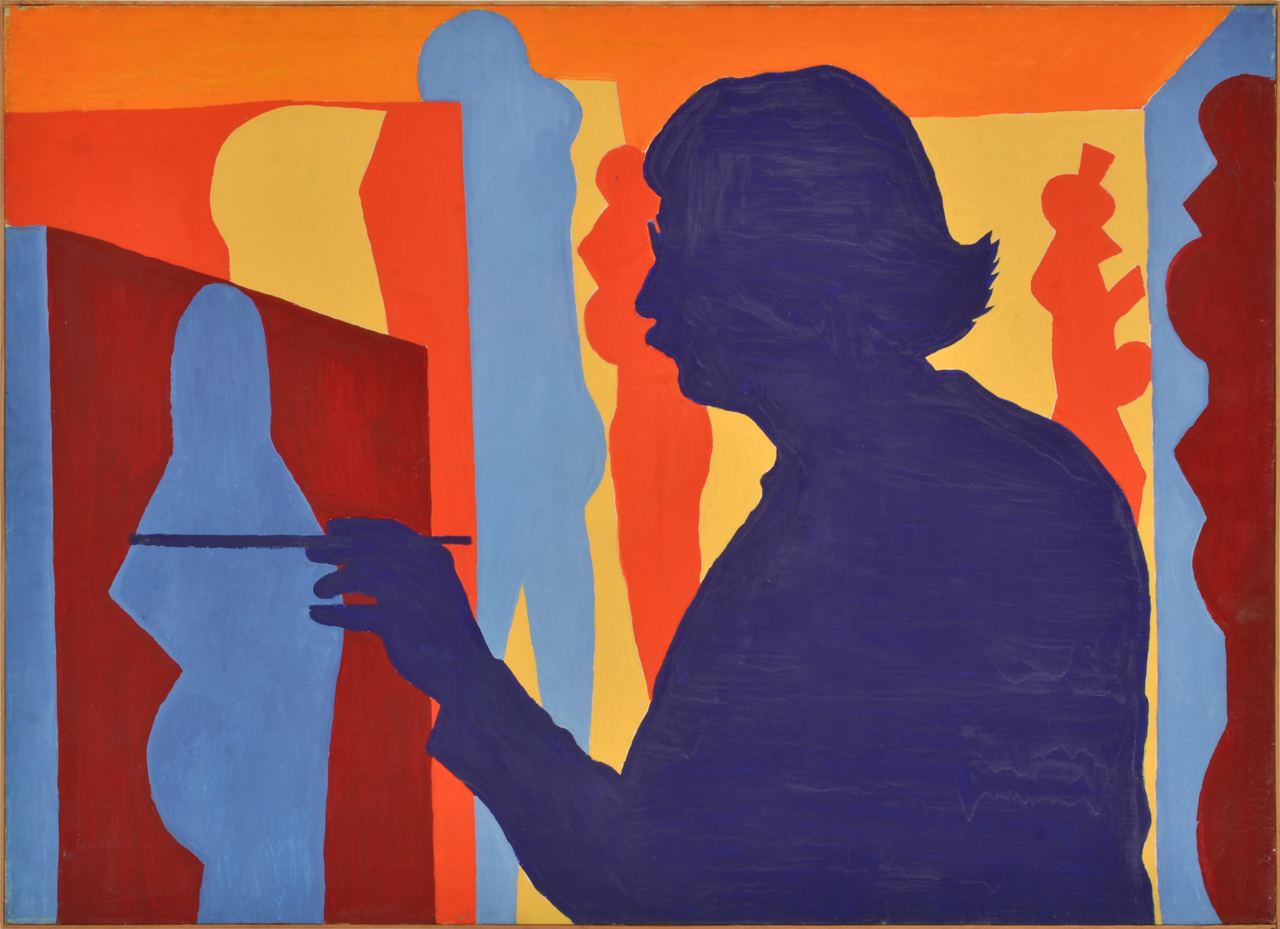
Man (Self-Portrait, 1976)

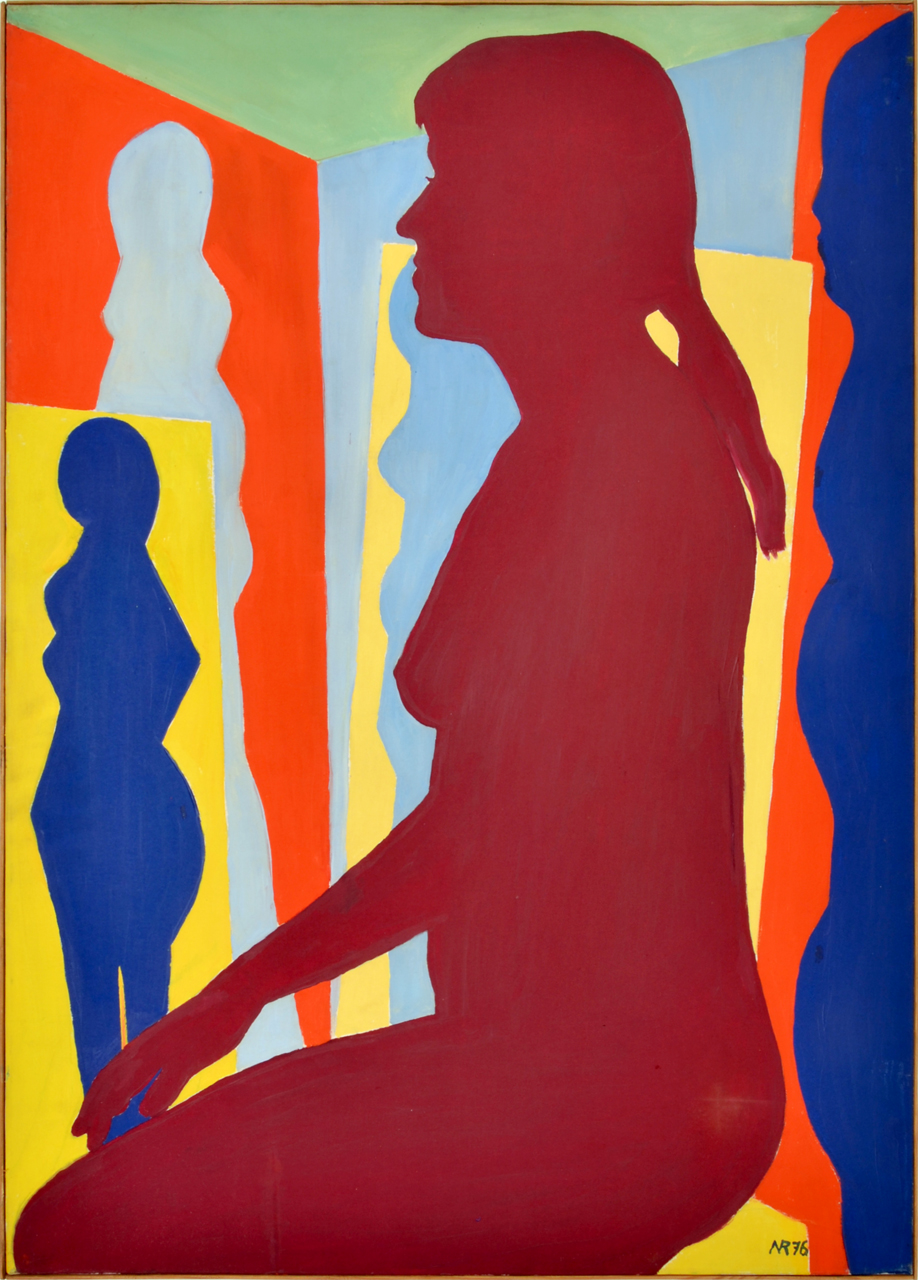
Rudolf Němec, Woman (1976)

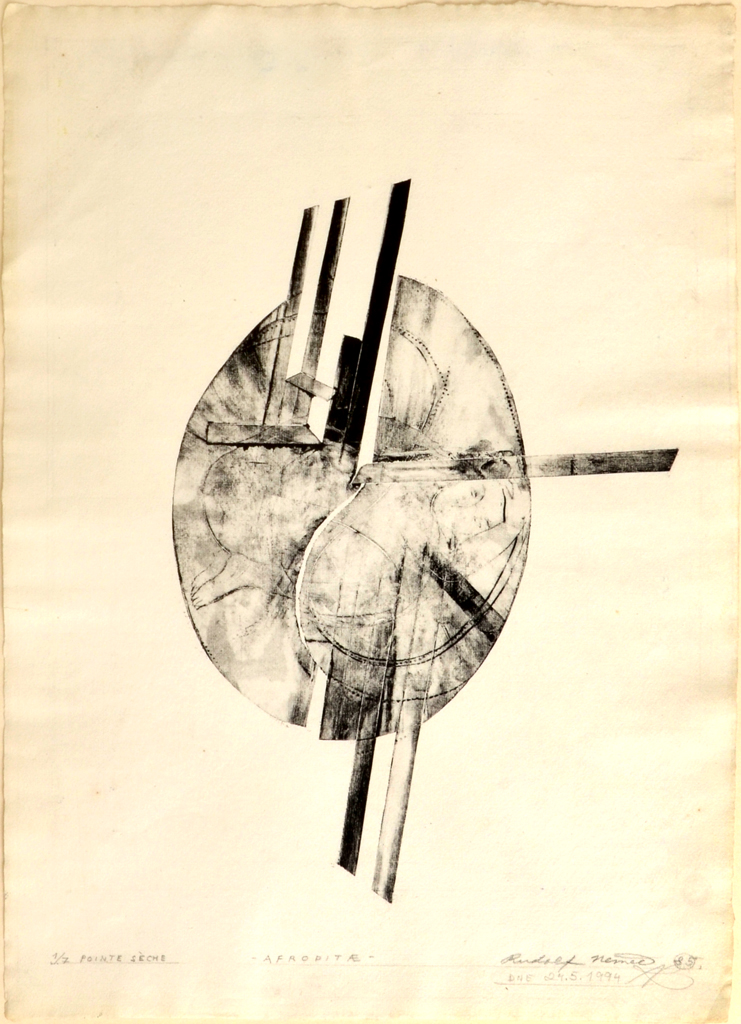
Aphrodite (1985), drypoint

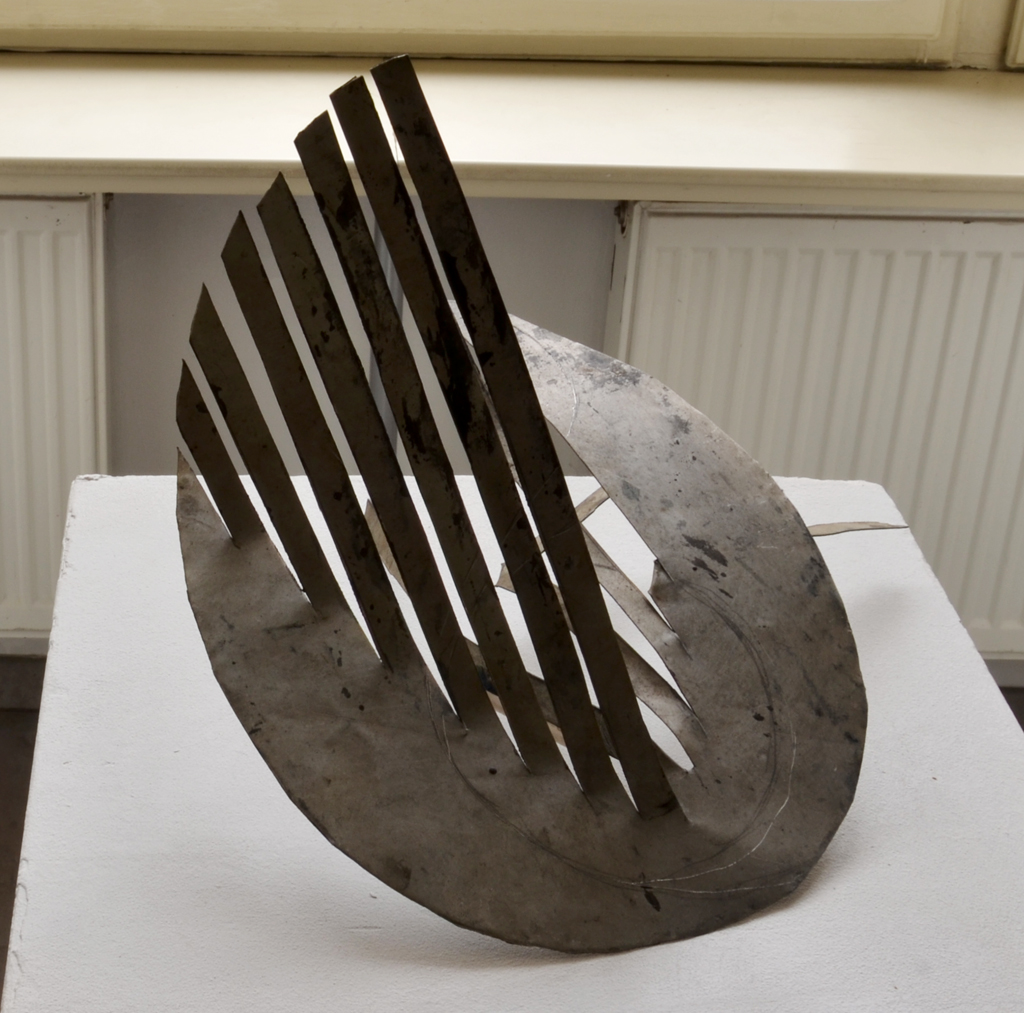
Object A (undated), metal

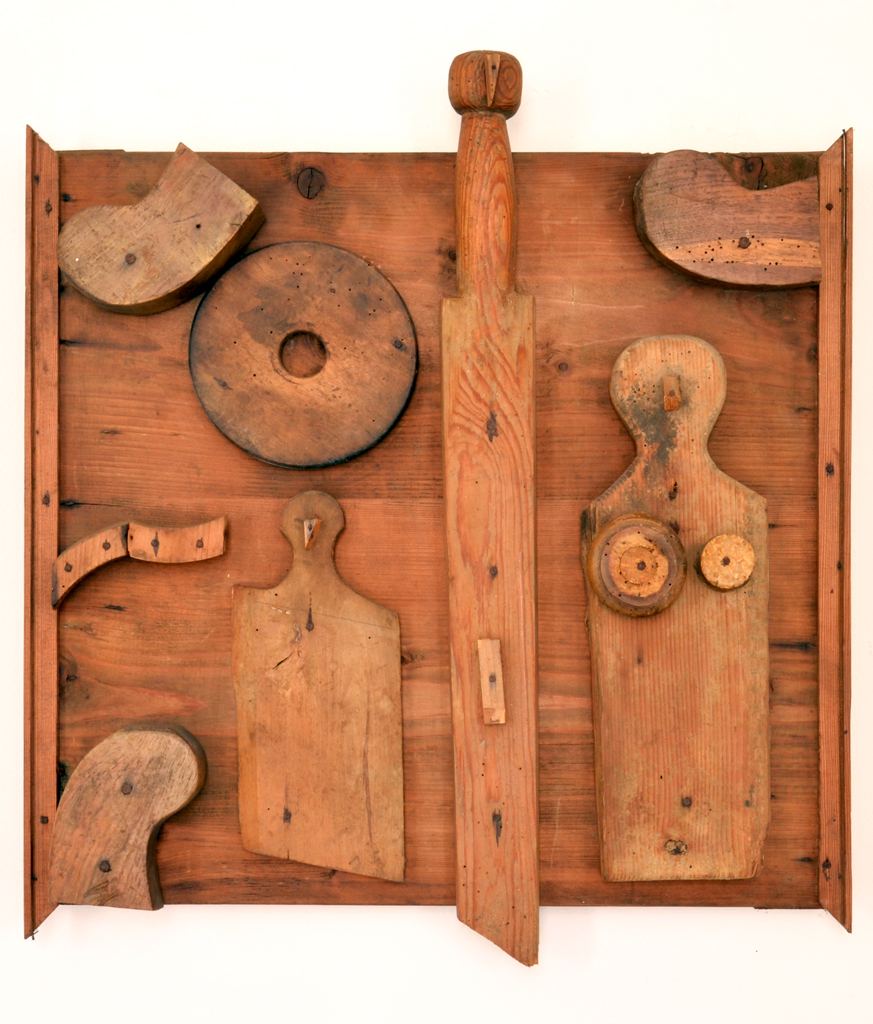
Family with Angels (1972), wood

=== Actions, photography, film ===
In the relaxed atmosphere of the late 1960s, partly with an overlap into the early 1970s, a variety of events developed in the circle of the Križovnická School - from private pataphysical escapades to performances, happenings or land art.

Rudolf Němec was an active participant in them as a scriptwriter and cameraman. The aim of Němec's actions is usually to record the changing reality, first by drawing, later with a film camera. The boundary of light and shadow plays an important role in them, as a recurring reminiscence of experiences from his early childhood, also reflected in Němec's later texts. The sun is a source of creative energy and a release from depression.

=== Events ===
- 1968 Drawing Shadows, Douville
- 1968 Happening of E. Brikcius in front of the National Theatre, recording of imaginary shadows of pedestrians
- 1970 The Sundial (E. Brikcius) and the event Cocoon-ing (R. Němec), Roztoky u Prahy
- 1970 Telesighting (E. Brikcius), at Petřín in Prague
- 1971 Penetration I, Dwelling, hop farm near Nelahozeves
- 1971 Penetration II, Liptov

=== Photos ===
Photography in Němec's work is a rather marginal affair and an alternative method to painterly prints. Photographs and rayograms have survived from the mid-1970s, showing the artist's face wrapped in a film strip (Self-Portraits with Negative, 1975), a combination of soot and rayogram (Self-Portrait III), and photographic silhouettes of female figures as a combined technique and variant of painterly decalqués.

=== Film ===
In 1968, Rudolf Nemec wrote the screenplay for Manipulation. The silent film was directed by Dobroslav Zborník in Helena Wilson's studio and screened at the Paris Student Film Festival that same year. Boris Hybner played the central and only character who is manipulated. Later, Rudolf Němec also worked as a production designer on the children's film Lucie and miracles (directed by Ota Koval, 1970).

=== Literary work ===
Rudolf Němec's literary work was created gradually from the 1970s onwards and includes prose poems and verses, fragments of memories, situational commentaries on current events, language puns and concise summaries of life experience in the form of maxims. A selection of the texts and an overview of the manuscript volumes from 1977 to 1994 was published in 2000 by Torst (Rudolf Němec: Nerozumím už Nietzschemu / I don´t understand Nietzsche any more, Prague 2000).

Němec's poems were used as the basis for the author's book with illustrations by Lucie Brychtová, Rudolf Němec - in a Madhouse, which she submitted as her bachelor's thesis (Masaryk University, Brno 2007).

=== Representation in collections ===
- National Gallery in Prague
- Slovak National Gallery, Bratislava
- Aleš South Bohemian Gallery in Hluboká nad Vltavou
- Czech Museum of Fine Arts in Prague (GASK)
- Gallery of Fine Arts in Ostrava
- North Bohemian Gallery of Fine Arts in Litoměřice
- Gallery of Modern Art in Roudnice nad Labem
- Regional Gallery of Fine Arts in Zlín
- Benedikt Rejt Gallery, Louny
- Gallery of Modern Art in Hradec Králové
- Gallery of Fine Arts in Havlíčkův Brod
- Regional Gallery in Liberec
- Terezín Memorial
- Private collections at home and abroad

=== Exhibitions ===
==== Author´s ====
- 1968 Rudolf Němec, Václav Špála Gallery, Prague
- 1977 Rudolf Němec, Gallery in the Tower, Mělník
- 1981 Rudolf Němec: Silhouettes, Club of Science and Education, Brno
- 1986 Rudolf Němec: Paintings, Graphic Art, Regional Gallery in Liberec
- 1987 Rudolf Němec: Monotypes, Small Gallery of the Czechoslovak Writers, Prague
- 1987 Rudolf Němec: Paintings, drawings, Gallery of the Čapek Brothers, Prague
- 1992 Rudolf Němec: Paintings/Drawings, Galerie K, Prague
- 1993 Rudolf Němec, Central Bohemian Gallery, Prague, Gallery of Modern Art in Hradec Králové
- 1997 From the Uncollected Collection of Marcela Pánková, Galerie U Kamene, Cheb, Galerie Hermit - Studio 600, Prague, Galerie bratří Čapků, Prague
- 2000 Rudolf Němec: I don't understand Nietzsche anymore, Peron Gallery, Prague
- 2009 Rudolf Němec: Prints, Dolmen Gallery, Prague
- 2018 Rudolf Němec, Museum Kampa, Prague

==== Collective exhibitions abroad (selection) ====
- 1965 Junge tschechische graphiker, 1. Teil, Alpbach
- 1967 17 tsjechische kunstenaars, Galerie Orez, Haag
- 1968 Tschechoslowakische zeitgenössische Kunst, Frankfurt am Main
- 1969 Junge Künstler aus der ČSSR, Haus am Kleistpark, Berlin
- 1970 77 grafici, Galleria del Palazzo dei Principi, Corregio
- 1979 Die Jungen aus der Tschechoslowakei, Schlossgalerie, Wört an der Donau
- 1993–2003 – Minisalon: Mons, Hollywood, Cincinnati, New York, Indianapolis, Rapids, Albuquerque, Savannah, Chicago, Columbia, Nord Dartmouth, Saint Petersburg, Fort Myers, Brussels, Jakarta, Ubud, Surabaya, Paris, Prague Castle
- 2003–2004 World of Stars and Illusions: Gems of the Czech Film Poster Tradition, Czech Centre New York City, Los Angeles, London, Dresden, Hongkong, Macau, Karlovy Vary
- Rudolf Němec has been represented in all major exhibitions of New Figuration since 1969 and in the survey exhibitions after 1989 (detailed in abART: Rudolf Němec)

== Sources ==
=== Bachelor thesis ===
- Tereza Jindrová: Rudolf Němec - Imprint, Silhouette, Grid, Institute of Art History, Faculty of Philosophy, Charles University, Prague 2011 on line (in Czech)
- Lucie Brychtová: Rudolf Němec - In the Madhouse, Faculty of Education, Masaryk University, Brno 2007 on line (in Czech)

=== Author's catalogues ===
- Rudolf Nemec: Prints, rasters, 1968, Petrová Eva, cat. 12 p., SČVU Praha
- Rudolf Němec, 1977, Kroutvor Josef, cat. 10 p., Galerie ve věži, Mělník
- Rudolf Němec: Silhouettes, 1981, Kříž Jan, cat. 7 p., Club of Science and Education, Brno
- Rudolf Němec: Selected Works, 1986, cat. 24 p., Regional Gallery in Liberec
- Rudolf Němec: Paintings, drawings, 1987, Petrová Eva, cat. 12 p., SČVU Praha
- Rudolf Němec, 1993, Hanel Olaf, Němec Rudolf, cat. 32 p., Central Bohemia Gallery, Prague

=== Collective catalogues ===
- K.Š. Křižovnická School of Pure Humour without Joke, 1991, Brikcius E et al., cat. 56 p., Gallery of Modern Art in Hradec Králové, Gallery of Fine Art in Olomouc, Central Bohemian Gallery, Prague
- Karel Nepraš and friends, 2007, Brikcius E et al., cat. 79 p., KGVU in Zlín

=== Publications ===
- Rudolf Němec: Nerozumím už Nietzschemu, texts by Pěkný Tomáš, Rous Jan, Šrut Pavel, 210 p., Torst, Prague, 2000, ISBN 80-7215-118-5
- Eugen Brikcius: Rudolf's Number, in: The Interpreted Artists or Art Historical Fairy Tales, 1990, pp. 79–80
- Rudolf Němec: The Painter's Memoirs:, 14 sheets in plates, 1977, Archive of Fine Arts, Kostelec n. Č. lesy
- Rat's Nest, Topinka Miloslav, 132 p., Mladá fronta, Prague 1970 (the edition was officially scrapped)
- Utopiír, Topinka Miloslav, 72 p., Mladá fronta Praha, 1969
