= Nimitz Hill =

Nimitz Hill may refer to:

- Nimitz Hill (geographic feature), a hill in Asan, Guam surrounded by the Nimitz Hill Annex census-designated place
- Nimitz Hill (CDP), a census-designated place in Piti, Guam located adjacent to the Nimitz Hill Annex CDP
- Nimitz Hill Annex, a census-designated place in Asan, Guam in which several U.S. military and government facilities are located
