= Niemiec =

Niemiec is a Polish-language surname literally meaning "German person". Notable people with this surname include:

- Al Niemiec (1911–1995), American baseball player
- Bohuslav Niemiec (born 1982), Czech politician of Polish ethnicity
- Courtney Niemiec (born 1992), American soccer player
- Jan Niemiec (1958–2020), Polish-born Ukrainian Roman Catholic bishop
- Jan Niemiec (1941–2017), Polish canoeist
- John Niemiec (1901–1976), American footballer
- Jona Niemiec (born 2001), German footballer
- Franciszek Niemiec (born 1950), Polish basketball player
- Patryk Niemiec (born 1997), Polish volleyball player
- Przemysław Niemiec (born 1980), Polish cyclist
- Szymon Niemiec (born 1977), Polish free jurisdiction clergyman and gay activist
- Wojciech Niemiec (1956–2021), Polish footballer
