= Jiřina Němcová =

Czech athlete (1937–2018)

Jiřina Němcová-Vobořilová
Personal information
- Nationality: Czech
- Born: 3 April 1937 Prague, Czechoslovakia
- Died: 15 August 2018 (aged 81)

Sport
- Sport: Athletics
- Event(s): Discus; High jump

Jiřina Němcová (née Vobořilová; 3 April 1937 – 15 August 2018) was a former Czech athlete. She competed at the 1956, 1960 and the 1964 Summer Olympics. Her husband Zdeněk Němec, was also a Czechoslovak athlete.
