= Carmelo Rado =

Italian discus thrower

Personal information
- Born: 4 August 1933 (age 92) Oderzo, Treviso, Italy
- Height: 1.86 m (6 ft 1 in)
- Weight: 105 kg (231 lb)

Sport
- Sport: Masters athletics
- Event: Discus throw
- Club: UG Biella

Achievements and titles
- Personal best: 58.45 m (1969)

Carmelo Rado (born 4 August 1933) is an Italian athletics competitor. He competed for his native country in the discus throw at the 1960 Olympics held in his home country, finishing in seventh place. He also competed in the 1962 European Athletics Championships.

== Biography ==
Rado grew up in Biella, and has lived in South Africa and San Donato Milanese. He currently lives in Calusco d'Adda, Bergamo.

Rado has continued to throw into the upper age divisions of masters athletics. He holds the current M70, M75 and M80 world record in the discus throw, the M75 and M80 world record in the weight pentathlon and the M80 world record in the weight throw.

== See also ==
- List of Italian records in masters athletics
