= 2009 World Championships in Athletics – Men's discus throw =

The Men's Discus Throw event at the 2009 World Championships in Athletics was held at the Olympic Stadium on August 18 and August 19.

As the only man to throw in excess of seventy metres that season, reigning world and Olympic champion Gerd Kanter of Estonia was the event favourite. Veteran athlete Virgilijus Alekna, the last athlete to beat Kanter in competition, was a strong medal possibility. Olympic silver medallist Piotr Małachowski was another contender, as was German Robert Harting who won silver at the previous world championships. The season had been of a high standard, with a number of athletes throwing over 65 m, including Frank Casañas, Bogdan Pishchalnikov and Zoltán Kővágó.

On the first day of competition, qualification went smoothly as many of the highest ranked athletes qualified for the final on their first throw, with seven of them passing the automatic qualification mark of 64.50 m. Casañas and Estonia's number two Aleksander Tammert were the only high-profile athletes to be eliminated. Home competitor Harting had the best throw of the day (66.81), and Kővágó and Kanter were the next best qualifiers.

In the final, Małachowski and Harting started very well on their first throws, with the former taking the lead with a Polish record-breaking throw, while the latter recorded a season's best. The pre-event favourites Kanter and Alekna were unable to challenge the two, as the Estonian took the bronze with his fourth round throw of 66.88 m and the Lithuanian never bettered his first throw of the day (66.36 m) and finished up in fourth place. Consistently throwing better than the rest of the field, Harting and Małachowski battled for the top spot. The Pole improved his lead with 69.15 m in the fifth round, another national record, but Harting took the gold with his final throw of the competition, recording a personal best of 69.43 m.

The victory for the home athlete was marred by his controversial comments regarding an initiative by victims of doping in East Germany. Former East German athletes, who had suffered through the state-sponsored doping program in the 1980s, were distributing glasses outside the stadium to encourage people not to "turn a blind eye" to doping. Harting said that he wished his discus would bounce from the ground and hit wearers in the eyes, but he later retracted and apologise for his statement.

== Medallists ==
Gold	Robert Harting; Germany (GER)
Silver	Piotr Małachowski; Poland (POL)
Bronze	Gerd Kanter; Estonia (EST)

== Records ==
World record	Jürgen Schult (GDR)	74.08	Neubrandenburg, East Germany	6 June 1986
Championship record	Virgilijus Alekna (LTU)	70.17	Helsinki, Finland	7 August 2005
World leading	Gerd Kanter (EST)	71.64	Kohila Parish, Estonia	25 June 2009
African record	Frantz Kruger (RSA)	70.32	Salon-de-Provence, France	26 May 2002
Asian record	Ehsan Haddadi (IRI)	69.32	Tallinn, Estonia	3 June 2008
North American record	Ben Plucknett (USA)	71.32	Eugene, United States	4 June 1983
South American record	Jorge Balliengo (ARG)	66.32	Rosario, Argentina	15 April 2006
European record	Jürgen Schult (GDR)	74.08	Neubrandenburg, East Germany	6 June 1986
Oceanian record	Benn Harradine (AUS)	66.37	Salinas, United States	22 May 2008

== Qualification standards ==
A standard	B standard
64.50 m	62.50 m

== Schedule ==
Date	Time	Round
August 18, 2009	10:05	Qualification
August 19, 2009	20:10	Final

== Results ==
=== Qualification ===
Qualification: Qualifying Performance 64.50 (Q) or at least 12 best performers (q) advance to the final.

Rank	Group	Athlete	Nationality	#1	#2	#3	Result	Notes
1	A	Robert Harting	Germany	66.81			66.81	Q
2	A	Gerd Kanter	Estonia	66.73			66.73	Q
3	B	Zoltán Kővágó	Hungary	x	65.82		65.82	Q
4	B	Jarred Rome	United States	60.92	65.51		65.51	Q
5	A	Casey Malone	United States	65.13			65.13	Q
6	B	Virgilijus Alekna	Lithuania	65.04			65.04	Q
7	A	Mario Pestano	Spain	65.03			65.03	Q
8	B	Piotr Małachowski	Poland	64.20	64.48	62.65	64.48	q
9	A	Bogdan Pishchalnikov	Russia	62.93	61.09	60.08	62.93	q
10	A	Omar Ahmed El Ghazaly	Egypt	62.84	62.09	x	62.84	q
11	B	Gerhard Mayer	Austria	62.53	59.33	62.19	62.53	q
12	B	Frantz Kruger	Finland	62.29	x	60.45	62.29	q
13	A	Aleksander Tammert	Estonia	62.24	61.93	59.44	62.24	
14	A	Ian Waltz	United States	x	60.27	62.04	62.04	
15	A	Benn Harradine	Australia	60.73	61.74	60.79	61.74	
16	B	Frank Casañas	Spain	x	x	61.10	61.10	
17	A	Gaute Myklebust	Norway	x	60.80	x	60.80	
18	A	Bertrand Vili	France	60.68	x	x	60.68	
19	B	Erik Cadee	Netherlands	x	60.64	x	60.64	
20	B	Markus Münch	Germany	60.55	x	59.12	60.55	
21	B	Ivan Hryshyn	Ukraine	59.93	57.28	x	59.93	
22	B	Märt Israel	Estonia	59.58	x	-	59.58	
23	A	Jorge Balliengo	Argentina	56.69	55.32	59.19	59.19	
24	B	Ahmed Mohamed Dheeb	Qatar	55.33	59.16	x	59.16	
25	B	Nikolay Sedyuk	Russia	x	59.03	58.62	59.03	
26	A	Oleksiy Semenov	Ukraine	58.78	57.31	x	58.78	
27	A	Daniel Schärer	Switzerland	58.50	58.23	57.22	58.50	
28	B	Germán Lauro	Argentina	57.88	x	x	57.88	
29	B	Ercüment Olgundeniz	Turkey	56.54	x	57.52	57.52	
	A	Haidar Nasir	Iraq	x	x	x	NM	

=== Final ===
Rank	Athlete	Nationality	#1	#2	#3	#4	#5	#6	Result	Notes
1st place, gold medalist(s)	Robert Harting	Germany	68.25	67.04	67.80	x	67.80	69.43	69.43	PB
2nd place, silver medalist(s)	Piotr Małachowski	Poland	68.77	68.05	67.00	x	69.15	67.33	69.15	NR
3rd place, bronze medalist(s)	Gerd Kanter	Estonia	65.91	65.65	x	66.88	66.24	65.45	66.88	
4	Virgilijus Alekna	Lithuania	66.36	66.32	65.68	64.53	66.24	x	66.36	
5	Casey Malone	United States	63.61	61.59	65.64	64.84	65.98	66.06	66.06	
6	Zoltán Kővágó	Hungary	x	63.09	62.47	x	65.17	61.69	65.17	
7	Bogdan Pishchalnikov	Russia	62.03	63.29	63.18	64.26	65.02	x	65.02	
8	Gerhard Mayer	Austria	62.16	60.49	63.17	x	60.83	x	63.17	
9	Omar Ahmed El Ghazaly	Egypt	62.13	62.83	62.76				62.83	
10	Mario Pestano	Spain	62.76	x	62.27				62.76	
11	Jarred Rome	United States	58.48	62.47	x				62.47	
12	Frantz Kruger	Finland	x	59.77	x				59.77	

Key: PB = Personal best, NR = National record
