= 2007 World Championships in Athletics – Men's discus throw =

The men's discus throw event at the 2007 World Championships in Athletics took place on August 26, 2007 (qualification) and August 28, 2007 (final) at the Nagai Stadium in Osaka, Japan.

== Medallists ==
Gold	Gerd Kanter; Estonia (EST)
Silver	Robert Harting; Germany (GER)
Bronze	Rutger Smith; Netherlands (NED)

== Abbreviations ==
- All results shown are in metres

Q	automatic qualification
q	qualification by rank
DNS	did not start
NM	no mark
WR	world record
AR	area record
NR	national record
PB	personal best
SB	season best

== Records ==
World record	Jürgen Schult (GDR)	74.08	Neubrandenburg, East Germany	6 June 1986
Championship record	Virgilijus Alekna (LTU)	70.17	Helsinki, Finland	7 August 2005

== Results ==
=== Qualification ===
==== Group A ====
Place	Athlete	Nation	1	2	3	Mark	Notes
1	Gerd Kanter	Estonia	56.59	58.81	67.45	67.45	Q
2	Rutger Smith	Netherlands	64.06	66.60		66.60	Q PB
3	Zoltán Kővágó	Hungary	62.09	65.71		65.71	Q
4	Piotr Małachowski	Poland	63.00	62.45	63.20	63.20	q
5	Mario Pestano	Spain	62.36	63.10	X	63.10	q
6	Rashid Shafi Al-Dosari	Qatar	62.68	X	61.47	62.68	q
7	Ian Waltz	United States	X	62.67	61.62	62.67	
8	Sultan Mubarak Al-Dawoodi	Saudi Arabia	59.14	X	61.23	61.23	
9	Vikas Gowda	India	61.22	X	X	61.22	
10	Bogdan Pishchalnikov	Russia	X	59.32	61.13	61.13	
11	Frantz Kruger	Finland	X	X	60.72	60.72	
12	Märt Israel	Estonia	59.92	60.23	60.18	60.23	
13	Sergiu Ursu	Romania	X	X	59.22	59.22	
14	Shigeo Hatakeyama	Japan	52.51	55.71	54.23	55.71	
15	Ercüment Olgundeniz	Turkey	X	54.89	54.62	54.89	

==== Group B ====
Place	Athlete	Nation	1	2	3	Mark	Notes
1	Virgilijus Alekna	Lithuania	X	63.70	66.54	66.54	Q
2	Robert Harting	Germany	66.26			66.26	Q
3	Gábor Máté	Hungary	65.13			65.13	Q
4	Aleksander Tammert	Estonia	64.41	−	−	64.41	q SB
5	Omar Ahmed El Ghazaly	Egypt	X	63.56	X	63.56	q
6	Ehsan Haddadi	Iran	62.75	61.44	62.00	62.75	q
7	Mikko Kyyrö	Finland	62.11	61.75	X	62.11	
8	Jarred Rome	United States	X	X	61.87	61.87	
9	Michael Robertson	United States	60.15	X	60.39	60.39	
10	Hannes Kirchler	Italy	57.09	60.28	60.34	60.34	
11	Erik Cadee	Netherlands	58.78	59.98	56.99	59.98	
12	Stanislav Nesterovskyy	Ukraine	56.00	59.81	57.56	59.81	
13	Niklas Arrhenius	Sweden	54.98	55.18	58.76	58.76	
14	Jason Morgan	Jamaica	55.32	52.93	53.67	55.32	

=== Final ===
Place	Athlete	Nation	Mark	Notes
1st place, gold medalist(s)	Gerd Kanter	Estonia	68.94	
2nd place, silver medalist(s)	Robert Harting	Germany	66.68	
3rd place, bronze medalist(s)	Rutger Smith	Netherlands	66.42	
4	Virgilijus Alekna	Lithuania	65.24	
5	Gábor Máté	Hungary	64.71	
6	Omar Ahmed El Ghazaly	Egypt	64.58	
7	Ehsan Haddadi	Iran	64.53	
8	Aleksander Tammert	Estonia	64.33	
9	Zoltán Kővágó	Hungary	63.04	
10	Mario Pestano	Spain	62.70	
11	Rashid Shafi Al-Dosari	Qatar	62.60	
12	Piotr Małachowski	Poland	60.77	
