= 2006 European Athletics Championships – Men's discus throw =

Men's discus throw at the European Athletics Championships

The men's discus throw at the 2006 European Athletics Championships were held at the Ullevi on August 10 and August 12.

== Medalists ==
Gold	Silver	Bronze
Virgilijus Alekna; Lithuania	Gerd Kanter; Estonia	Aleksander Tammert; Estonia

== Schedule ==
Date	Time	Round
August 10, 2006	10:30	Qualification
August 12, 2006	16:30	Final

== Results ==
=== Qualification ===
Qualification: Qualifying Performance 63.50 (Q) or at least 12 best performers (q) advance to the final.

Rank	Group	Athlete	Nationality	#1	#2	#3	Result	Notes
1	A	Gerd Kanter	Estonia	x	61.49	66.71	66.71	Q
2	B	Virgilijus Alekna	Lithuania	57.25	x	64.53	64.53	Q
3	A	Piotr Małachowski	Poland	61.75	63.76		63.76	Q
4	A	Rutger Smith	Netherlands	60.58	63.53		63.53	Q
5	A	Aleksander Tammert	Estonia	63.51			63.51	Q
6	B	Lars Riedel	Germany	63.36			63.36	q
7	B	Mario Pestano	Spain	63.08	62.42	62.05	63.08	q
8	A	Roland Varga	Hungary	x	61.01	60.79	61.01	q
9	A	Michael Möllenbeck	Germany	x	58.42	60.62	60.62	q
10	B	Gábor Máté	Hungary	60.53	x	x	60.53	q
11	A	Sergiu Ursu	Romania	60.50	x	58.39	60.50	q
12	A	Andrzej Krawczyk	Poland	60.11	59.78	58.66	60.11	q
13	B	Robert Harting	Germany	59.24	59.38	59.87	59.87	
14	B	Märt Israel	Estonia	x	59.30	59.80	59.80	
15	A	Gerhard Mayer	Austria	55.59	x	59.54	59.54	
16	B	Olgierd Stański	Poland	x	x	59.30	59.30	
17	B	Bogdan Pishchalnikov	Russia	58.77	x	56.34	58.77	
18	A	Mikko Kyyrö	Finland	57.82	58.59	x	58.59	
19	A	Stanislav Alekseyev	Russia	56.91	x	55.71	56.91	
20	B	Hannes Kirchler	Italy	x	x	56.78	56.78	
21	B	Niklas Arrhenius	Sweden	x	x	56.62	56.62	
22	A	Cristiano Andrei	Italy	54.82	54.42	54.74	54.82	
23	B	Mika Loikkanen	Finland	56.08	53.98	x	56.08	
	B	Dmitriy Shevchenko	Russia	x	x	x	NM	

=== Final ===
Rank	Athlete	Nationality	#1	#2	#3	#4	#5	#6	Result	Notes
1st place, gold medalist(s)	Virgilijus Alekna	Lithuania	68.67	67.63	67.34	67.37	67.33	66.57	68.67	
2nd place, silver medalist(s)	Gerd Kanter	Estonia	61.04	x	68.03	x	x	x	68.03	
3rd place, bronze medalist(s)	Aleksander Tammert	Estonia	62.02	65.32	66.14	65.59	65.29	60.72	66.14	
4	Mario Pestano	Spain	63.80	64.84	62.66	63.54	64.26	62.52	64.84	
5	Michael Möllenbeck	Germany	x	64.82	64.75	62.89	62.00	-	64.82	
6	Piotr Małachowski	Poland	61.81	64.57	62.52	61.83	63.77	x	64.57	
7	Rutger Smith	Netherlands	63.52	63.33	64.06	62.14	62.61	64.46	64.46	
8	Lars Riedel	Germany	64.11	x	59.88	64.07	59.56	58.43	64.11	
9	Sergiu Ursu	Romania	58.14	62.48	x				62.48	
10	Andrzej Krawczyk	Poland	x	59.77	61.56				61.56	
11	Roland Varga	Hungary	x	x	60.52				60.52	
12	Gábor Máté	Hungary	56.52	57.35	x				57.35	
