= 2005 World Championships in Athletics – Men's discus throw =

The Men's Discus Throw at the 2005 World Championships in Athletics was held at the Helsinki Olympic Stadium on August 6 and August 7.

== Medalists ==
Gold	Virgilijus Alekna; Lithuania (LTU)
Silver	Gerd Kanter; Estonia (EST)
Bronze	Michael Möllenbeck; Germany (GER)

== Schedule ==
- All times are Eastern European Time (UTC+2)

Qualification Round
Group A	Group B
06.08.2005 – 18:20h	06.08.2005 – 19:50h
Final Round
07.08.2005 – 18:40h

== Abbreviations ==
- All results shown are in metres

Q	automatic qualification
q	qualification by rank
DNS	did not start
NM	no mark
WR	world record
AR	area record
NR	national record
PB	personal best
SB	season best

== Qualifying ==
=== Group A ===
1. Gerd Kanter, Estonia 65.76 m Q
2. Jason Tunks, Canada 64.02 m Q
3. Michael Möllenbeck, Germany 63.71 m Q
4. Frantz Kruger, South Africa 63.44 m q
5. Jarred Rome, United States 62.72 m q
6. Carl Brown, United States 61.91 m
7. Bogdan Pishchalnikov, Russia 61.91 m
8. Jo Van Daele, Belgium 61.12 m
9. Vasiliy Kaptyukh, Belarus 61.04 m
10. Frank Casañas, Cuba 60.94 m
11. Jorge Balliengo, Argentina 60.40 m
12. Abbas Samimi, Iran 60.25 m
13. Gábor Máté, Hungary 58.97 m
- Rutger Smith, Netherlands DNS

=== Group B ===
1. Virgilijus Alekna, Lithuania 68.79 m Q
2. Lars Riedel, Germany 66.22 m Q (SB)
3. Mario Pestano, Spain 65.04 m Q
4. Andrzej Krawczyk, Poland 64.51 m Q
5. Zoltán Kővágó, Hungary 64.30 m Q
6. Ian Waltz, United States 64.30 m Q
7. Aleksander Tammert, Estonia 64.02 m Q
8. Libor Malina, Czech Republic 62.41 m
9. Vikas Gowda, India 62.04 m
10. Roland Varga, Hungary 61.94 m
11. Tao Wu, China 61.75 m
12. Gaute Myklebust, Norway 60.00 m
13. Timo Tompuri, Finland 59.11 m

== Final ==
Rank	Athlete	Attempts						Distance	Note
Rank	Athlete	1	2	3	4	5	6	Distance	Note
1st place, gold medalist(s)	Virgilijus Alekna (LTU)	63.93	67.90	68.10	66.75	X	70.17	70.17 m	CR
2nd place, silver medalist(s)	Gerd Kanter (EST)	X	64.69	65.10	68.57	65.53	62.64	68.57 m	
3rd place, bronze medalist(s)	Michael Möllenbeck (GER)	X	65.24	64.99	65.95	X	—	65.95 m	
4	Aleksander Tammert (EST)	62.28	63.59	63.18	64.18	63.50	64.84	64.84 m	
5	Ian Waltz (USA)	63.88	64.05	X	X	64.27	64.02	64.27 m	
6	Frantz Kruger (RSA)	63.19	61.47	60.92	63.64	64.23	X	64.23 m	
7	Jarred Rome (USA)	64.22	61.87	X	62.64	63.68	X	64.22 m	
8	Jason Tunks (CAN)	63.39	63.77	X	X	X	X	63.77 m	
9	Lars Riedel (GER)	63.05	X	62.47				63.05 m	
10	Zoltán Kővágó (HUN)	62.94	62.68	59.61				62.94 m	
11	Mario Pestano (ESP)	62.75	60.32	X				62.75 m	
12	Andrzej Krawczyk (POL)	59.58	61.00	62.71				62.71 m	
