= Athletics at the 1999 Summer Universiade – Men's discus throw =

The men's discus throw event at the 1999 Summer Universiade was held at the Estadio Son Moix in Palma de Mallorca, Spain on 8 and 9 July.

== Medalists ==
Gold	Silver	Bronze
Frantz Kruger; South Africa	Andy Bloom; United States	Doug Reynolds; United States

== Results ==
=== Qualification ===
Qualification: 59.00 (Q) or at least 12 best performers (q) advance to the final

Rank	Group	Athlete	Nationality	#1	#2	#3	Result	Notes
1	A	Andy Bloom	United States				64.57	Q
2	B	Doug Reynolds	United States				63.27	Q
3	A	Roland Varga	Hungary				61.99	Q
4	B	Frantz Kruger	South Africa				61.96	Q
5	B	Aleksander Tammert	Estonia				61.91	Q
6	B	Mika Loikkanen	Finland				60.55	Q
7	A	Olgierd Stański	Poland				59.97	Q
8	B	Andrzej Krawczyk	Poland				59.60	Q
9	A	Pieter van der Kruk	Netherlands				59.28	Q
10	B	Gábor Máté	Hungary				59.28	Q
11	A	Frits Potgieter	South Africa				59.17	Q
12	A	Mario Pestano	Spain	x	58.15	58.94	58.94	q
13	B	Paulo Bernardo	Portugal				58.63	
14	B	Stefano Lomater	Italy				58.35	
15	B	Einar Kristian Tveitå	Norway				58.21	
16	A	Brad Snyder	Canada				57.34	
17	B	Jason Gervais	Canada				57.15	
18	A	Timo Sinervo	Finland				56.91	
19	A	Eivind Smörgrav	Norway				56.74	
20	A	Emeka Udechuku	Great Britain				56.70	
21	B	Jesús Camblor	Spain	53.06	x	52.02	53.06	
22	A	Juan Manuel Tello	Peru				52.44	
23	A	Wael Mohd	Qatar				49.49	
24	B	Kristian Pettersson	Sweden				48.64	
25	B	Leonardo Ochoa	Peru				44.84	

=== Final ===
Rank	Athlete	Nationality	#1	#2	#3	#4	#5	#6	Result	Notes
1st place, gold medalist(s)	Frantz Kruger	South Africa	64.14	x	63.95	62.21	65.22	66.90	66.90	
2nd place, silver medalist(s)	Andy Bloom	United States	62.83	61.24	63.73	62.62	64.68	x	64.68	
3rd place, bronze medalist(s)	Doug Reynolds	United States							63.65	
4	Aleksander Tammert	Estonia							61.95	
5	Frits Potgieter	South Africa							61.10	
6	Olgierd Stański	Poland							61.04	
7	Roland Varga	Hungary							60.54	
8	Pieter van der Kruk	Netherlands							57.83	
9	Mika Loikkanen	Finland							56.54	
10	Andrzej Krawczyk	Poland							56.24	
11	Mario Pestano	Spain	54.90	55.77	53.94				55.77	
12	Gábor Máté	Hungary							55.59	
