= Athletics at the 2008 Summer Olympics – Men's discus throw =

Men's discus throw at the Games of the XXIX Olympiad
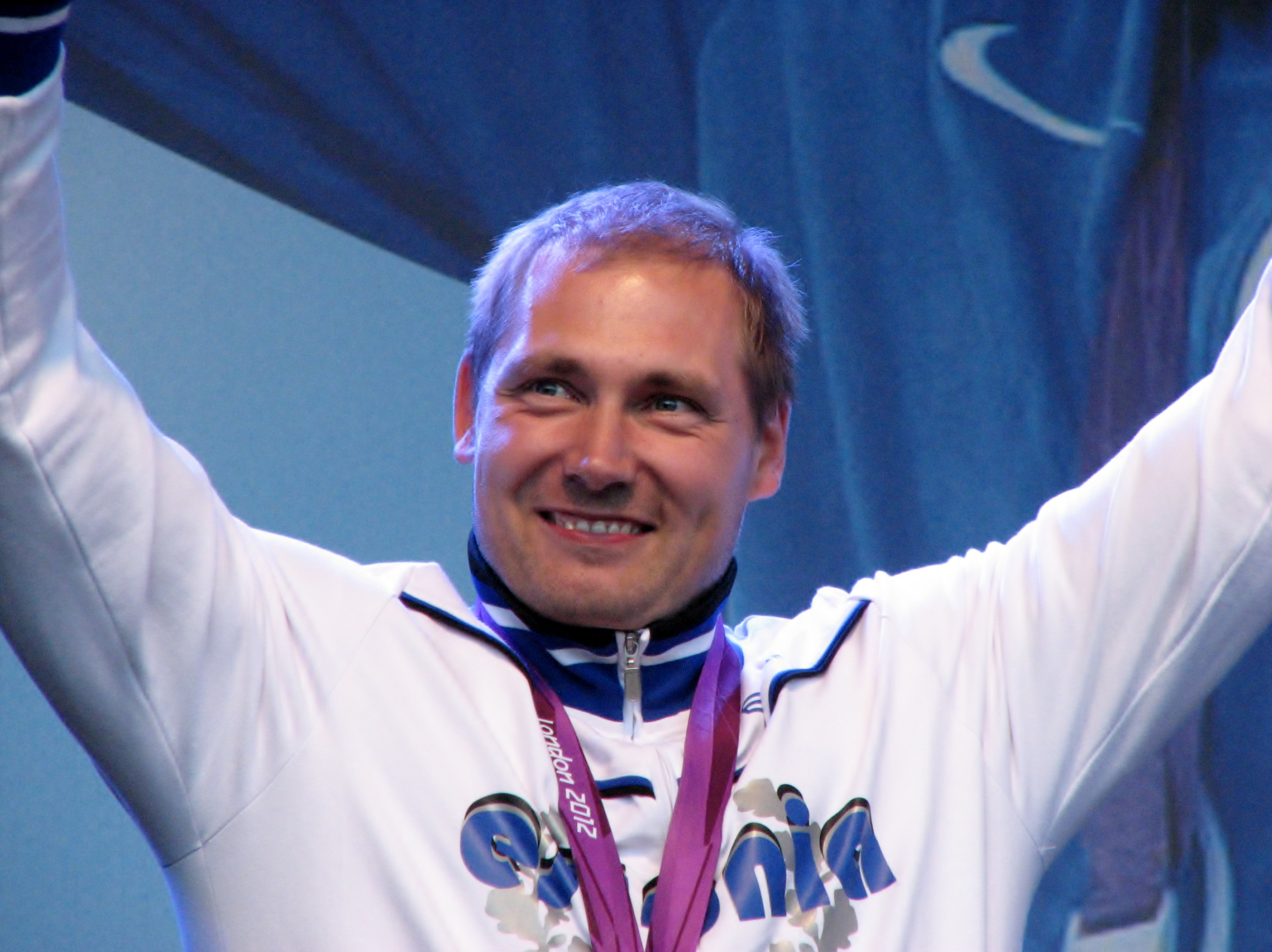
- Gerd Kanter (2012)
- Venue: Beijing National Stadium
- Dates: 16 August 2008 (qualifying); 19 August 2008 (final)
- Competitors: 37 from 29 nations
- Winning distance: 68.82

Medalists
1st place, gold medalist(s)		Gerd Kanter; Estonia
2nd place, silver medalist(s)		Piotr Małachowski; Poland
3rd place, bronze medalist(s)		Virgilijus Alekna; Lithuania

The men's discus throw event at the 2008 Summer Olympics took place on 16–19 August at the Beijing National Stadium. Thirty-seven athletes from 29 nations competed. The event was won by Gerd Kanter of Estonia, the nation's first victory in the men's discus throw. Piotr Małachowski took silver to give Poland its first medal in the event. Lithuanian thrower Virgilijus Alekna's bronze made him the third man to win three medals in the sport, adding to his gold medals from 2000 and 2004.

== Background ==
This was the 26th appearance of the event, which is one of 12 athletics events to have been held at every Summer Olympics. The returning finalists from the 2004 Games were two-time gold medalist (and 1996 finalist) Virgilijus Alekna of Lithuania, silver medalist Zoltán Kővágó of Hungary, bronze medalist (and 2000 finalist) Aleksander Tammert of Estonia, fifth-place finisher Frantz Kruger of South Africa, sixth-place finisher Casey Malone of the United States, eleventh-place finisher Gábor Máté of Hungary, and Róbert Fazekas (also of Hungary), who had initially won in 2004 but had been disqualified for doping. Alekna had won the 2003 and 2005 world championships as well as the 2000 and 2004 Olympics. The 2007 world champion was Gerd Kanter of Estonia. Alekna and Kanter were favored in Beijing.

The British Virgin Islands made its debut in the men's discus throw. The United States made its 25th appearance, most of any nation, having missed only the boycotted 1980 Games.

== Qualification ==
The qualifying standards were 64.50 m (211.61 ft) (A standard) and 62.50 m (205.05 ft) (B standard). Each National Olympic Committee (NOC) was able to enter up to three entrants providing they had met the A qualifying standard in the qualifying period (1 January 2007 to 23 July 2008). NOCs were also permitted to enter one athlete providing he had met the B standard in the same qualifying period. The maximum number of athletes per nation had been set at 3 since the 1930 Olympic Congress.

== Competition format ==
The competition used the two-round format introduced in 1936, with the qualifying round completely separate from the divided final. In qualifying, each athlete received three attempts; those recording a mark of at least 64.50 metres advanced to the final. If fewer than 12 athletes achieved that distance, the top 12 would advance. The results of the qualifying round were then ignored. Finalists received three throws each, with the top eight competitors receiving an additional three attempts. The best distance among those six throws counted.

== Records ==
Prior to the competition, the existing world and Olympic records were as follows.

World record	Jürgen Schult (GDR)	74.08	Neubrandenburg, East Germany	6 June 1986
Olympic record	Virgilijus Alekna (LTU)	69.89	Athens, Greece	23 August 2004

No new world or Olympic records were set during the competition.

== Schedule ==
All times are China standard time (UTC+8)

Date	Time	Round
Saturday, 16 August 2008	10:40	Qualifying
Tuesday, 19 August 2008	21:00	Final

== Results ==
=== Qualifying round ===
Qualification: 64.50 (Q) or at least 12 best performers (q) advance to the final.

Rank	Group	Athlete	Nation	1	2	3	Distance	Notes
1	A	Piotr Małachowski	Poland	65.94	—	—	65.94	Q
2	A	Virgilijus Alekna	Lithuania	65.84	—	—	65.84	Q
3	B	Rutger Smith	Netherlands	64.09	65.65	—	65.65	Q
4	B	Frank Casañas	Spain	X	X	64.99	64.99	Q
5	B	Gerd Kanter	Estonia	59.65	64.66	—	64.66	Q
6	A	Bogdan Pishchalnikov	Russia	62.68	63.93	64.60	64.60	Q
7	A	Mario Pestano	Spain	64.42	61.16	X	64.42	q
8	A	Robert Harting	Germany	64.19	X	X	64.19	q
9	B	Rashid Shafi Al-Dosari	Qatar	63.83	63.72	61.60	63.83	q
10	A	Aleksander Tammert	Estonia	57.79	61.57	63.10	63.10	q
11	A	Róbert Fazekas	Hungary	X	61.61	62.64	62.64	q
12	B	Frantz Kruger	Finland	X	58.60	62.48	62.48	q
13	A	Gábor Máté	Hungary	X	55.15	62.44	62.44	
14	B	Märt Israel	Estonia	61.98	59.78	61.63	61.98	
15	A	Dzmitry Sivakou	Belarus	59.64	X	61.75	61.75	
16	A	Michael Robertson	United States	60.97	61.64	X	61.64	
17	B	Ehsan Haddadi	Iran	61.08	X	61.34	61.34	
18	B	Gerhard Mayer	Austria	61.32	X	58.13	61.32	
19	A	Casey Malone	United States	59.48	X	61.26	61.26	
20	B	Ercüment Olgundeniz	Turkey	58.99	60.83	X	60.83	
21	B	Zoltán Kővágó	Hungary	60.79	59.46	60.44	60.79	
22	B	Vikas Gowda	India	59.58	X	60.69	60.69	
23	A	Omar Ahmed El Ghazaly	Egypt	59.71	58.95	60.24	60.24	
24	A	Oleksiy Semenov	Ukraine	57.84	60.18	59.41	60.18	
25	B	Ian Waltz	United States	60.02	X	X	60.02	
26	A	Abbas Samimi	Iran	58.01	59.92	58.85	59.92	
27	A	Jorge Fernández	Cuba	X	59.60	59.58	59.60	
28	A	Jan Marcell	Czech Republic	59.52	X	56.31	59.52	
29	B	Martin Marić	Croatia	59.25	X	59.09	59.25	
30	B	Jorge Balliengo	Argentina	58.71	58.82	X	58.82	
31	A	Benn Harradine	Australia	58.55	57.50	57.91	58.55	
32	B	Niklas Arrhenius	Sweden	56.64	58.22	56.77	58.22	
33	B	Hannes Kirchler	Italy	X	X	56.44	56.44	
34	A	Sultan Mubarak Al-Dawoodi	Saudi Arabia	56.29	55.54	56.24	56.29	
35	A	Vadim Hranovschi	Moldova	56.19	X	55.78	56.19	
36	B	Haidar Nasser Shaheed	Iraq	54.19	X	X	54.19	
37	B	Eric Matthias	British Virgin Islands	47.87	50.87	53.11	53.11	

=== Final ===
Rank	Athlete	Nation	1	2	3	4	5	6	Distance	Notes
1st place, gold medalist(s)	Gerd Kanter	Estonia	63.44	66.38	62.75	68.82	X	65.98	68.82	
2nd place, silver medalist(s)	Piotr Małachowski	Poland	66.45	67.82	66.98	63.91	65.78	X	67.82	
3rd place, bronze medalist(s)	Virgilijus Alekna	Lithuania	X	65.77	64.42	67.79	X	67.18	67.79	
4	Robert Harting	Germany	65.58	64.84	67.09	X		66.51	67.09	
5	Frank Casañas	Spain	59.54	62.16	64.46	64.11	64.97	66.49	66.49	
6	Bogdan Pishchalnikov	Russia	64.09	64.25	61.13	65.88	X	X	65.88	PB
7	Rutger Smith	Netherlands	64.61	65.31	64.36	64.25	X	65.39	65.39	
8	Róbert Fazekas	Hungary	62.25	63.43	62.49	X	X	59.34	63.43	
9	Mario Pestano	Spain	60.46	62.84	63.42	Did not advance			63.42	
10	Rashid Shafi Al-Dosari	Qatar	59.62	X	62.55	Did not advance			62.55	
11	Frantz Kruger	Finland	61.98	61.80	60.71	Did not advance			61.98	
12	Aleksander Tammert	Estonia	X	61.32	61.38	Did not advance			61.38	
