= 2012 European Athletics Championships – Men's discus throw =

Men's discus throw at the European Athletics Championships

The men's discus throw at the 2012 European Athletics Championships was held at the Helsinki Olympic Stadium on 29 and 30 June.

== Medalists ==
Gold	Robert Harting; Germany
Silver	Gerd Kanter; Estonia
Bronze	Rutger Smith; Netherlands

== Records ==
Standing records prior to the 2012 European Athletics Championships
World record	Jürgen Schult (GDR)	74.08	Neubrandenburg, East Germany	6 June 1986
European record	Jürgen Schult (GDR)	74.08	Neubrandenburg, East Germany	6 June 1986
Championship record	Piotr Małachowski (POL)	68.87	Barcelona, Spain	1 August 2010
World Leading	Robert Harting (GER)	71.45	Turnov, Czech Republic	22 May 2012
European Leading	Robert Harting (GER)	71.45	Turnov, Czech Republic	22 May 2012

== Schedule ==
Date	Time	Round
29 June 2012	9:00	Qualification
30 June 2012	19:10	Final

== Results ==
=== Qualification ===
Qualification: Qualification Performance 66.00 (Q) or at least 12 best performers advance to the final

Rank	Group	Athlete	Nationality	#1	#2	#3	Result	Notes
1	B	Mario Pestano	Spain	62.56	66.27		66.27	Q, SB
DQ	B	~~Zoltán Kővágó~~	~~Hungary~~	~~63.62~~	~~x~~	~~65.99~~	~~65.99~~	q, Doping
2	A	Robert Harting	Germany	64.88	65.49	–	65.49	q
3	B	Erik Cadée	Netherlands	65.09	–	–	65.09	q
4	B	Lawrence Okoye	Great Britain	60.31	64.86	–	64.86	q
5	A	Gerd Kanter	Estonia	59.08	63.71	64.85	64.85	q
6	A	Frank Casañas	Spain	x	64.50	62.27	64.50	q
7	A	Robert Urbanek	Poland	60.72	64.07	61.18	64.07	q
8	A	Rutger Smith	Netherlands	63.75	–	–	63.75	q
9	B	Markus Münch	Germany	61.44	60.95	62.83	62.83	q
10	B	Ercüment Olgundeniz	Turkey	62.82	x	x	62.82	q
11	A	Gerhard Mayer	Austria	60.32	62.35	60.20	62.35	q
12	B	Przemyslaw Czajkowski	Poland	61.90	62.22	60.22	62.22	
13	A	Apostolos Parellis	Cyprus	59.80	61.37	61.79	61.79	
14	A	Martin Wierig	Germany	58.08	61.34	x	61.34	
15	A	Mykyta Nesterenko	Ukraine	61.01	60.64	61.21	61.21	
16	B	Märt Israel	Estonia	x	60.59	58.31	60.59	
17	A	Leif Arrhenius	Sweden	58.99	59.02	60.49	60.49	
18	B	Danijel Furtula	Montenegro	x	60.18	x	60.18	
19	B	Mikko Kyyrö	Finland	60.16	x	x	60.16	
20	B	Gaute Myklebust	Norway	58.16	59.90	58.59	59.90	
21	B	Niklas Arrhenius	Sweden	58.26	x	59.02	59.02	
22	A	Brett Morse	Great Britain	x	x	58.71	58.71	
23	A	Abdul Buhari	Great Britain	58.57	x	x	58.57	
24	B	Oskars Vaisjūns	Latvia	57.05	56.06	58.34	58.34	
25	A	Giovanni Faloci	Italy	57.31	57.67	55.12	57.67	
26	B	Nikolay Sedyuk	Russia	55.71	x	57.08	57.08	
27	A	Yeóryios Trémos	Greece	56.94	x	x	56.94	
28	B	Sergiu Ursu	Romania	56.85	x	x	56.85	
29	A	Andrius Gudžius	Lithuania	x	55.80	x	55.80	
	B	Roland Varga	Croatia	x	x	x	NM	

=== Final ===
Rank	Athlete	Nationality	#1	#2	#3	#4	#5	#6	Result	Notes
1st place, gold medalist(s)	Robert Harting	Germany	63.02	65.80	x	68.30	–	67.07	68.30	
2nd place, silver medalist(s)	Gerd Kanter	Estonia	65.11	x	64.32	64.44	66.53	65.47	66.53	
DQ	~~Zoltán Kővágó~~	~~Hungary~~	~~65.45~~	~~62.07~~	~~x~~	~~63.77~~	~~63.66~~	~~66.42~~	~~66.42~~	Doping
3rd place, bronze medalist(s)	Rutger Smith	Netherlands	x	61.51	61.71	63.97	x	64.02	64.02	
4	Mario Pestano	Spain	60.51	62.26	62.05	63.87	x	x	63.87	
5	Frank Casañas	Spain	62.29	63.60	x	61.03	x	60.69	63.60	
6	Robert Urbanek	Poland	61.96	62.99	61.14	61.84	60.44	x	62.99	
7	Gerhard Mayer	Austria	62.85	61.27	57.11	x	x	60.58	62.85	
8	Markus Münch	Germany	60.27	61.25	x				61.25	
9	Ercüment Olgundeniz	Turkey	60.92	x	x				60.92	
10	Erik Cadée	Netherlands	x	60.49	60.58				60.58	
11	Lawrence Okoye	Great Britain	55.99	60.09	57.00				60.09	
