= Athletics at the 2003 Summer Universiade – Men's discus throw =

The men's discus throw event at the 2003 Summer Universiade was held on 27 August 2003 in Daegu, South Korea.

== Results ==
Rank	Athlete	Nationality	#1	#2	#3	#4	#5	#6	Result	Notes
1st place, gold medalist(s)	Wu Tao	China	x	56.54	62.08	x	62.32	x	62.32	
2nd place, silver medalist(s)	Andrzej Krawczyk	Poland	57.69	59.68	57.97	x	60.70	x	60.70	
3rd place, bronze medalist(s)	Emeka Udechuku	Great Britain	56.91	60.44	x	56.24	59.24	x	60.44	
4	Roland Varga	Hungary	x	x	59.43	56.60	x	x	59.43	
5	Mikko Kyyrö	Finland	56.61	59.33	x	56.93	58.65	x	59.33	
6	Aliaksandr Malashevich	Belarus	58.99	x	58.96	58.00	x	58.43	58.99	
7	Timo Sinervo	Finland	56.79	57.42	x	56.91	58.11	57.64	58.11	
8	Johannes van Wyk	South Africa	56.12	56.60	57.66	x	x	55.61	57.66	
9	Omar Ahmed El Ghazaly	Egypt	55.15	55.13	52.78				55.15	
10	Ivan Emilianov	Moldova	53.32	52.19	54.16				54.16	
11	Bogdan Pishchalnikov	Russia	x	53.63	52.48				53.63	
12	Märt Israel	Estonia	x	50.13	53.57				53.57	
13	Dzmitry Sivakou	Belarus	x	53.33	52.70				53.33	
14	Tulake Nuermaimaiti	China	45.93	52.98	x				52.98	
15	Choi Jong-bun	South Korea	x	51.39	x				51.39	
16	Salesi Ahokovi	Tonga	39.98	40.20	42.44				42.44	
	Kris Coene	Belgium	x	x	x				NM	
	Sisomphone Vongphakdy	Laos	x	x	x				NM	
	Alleyne Lett	Grenada							DNS	
