= Athletics at the 2001 Summer Universiade – Men's discus throw =

The men's discus throw event at the 2001 Summer Universiade was held at the Workers Stadium in Beijing, China on 28 and 29 August.

== Medalists ==
Gold	Silver	Bronze
Aleksander Tammert; Estonia	Leanid Charauko; Belarus	Aliaksandr Malashevich; Belarus

== Results ==
=== Qualification ===
Rank	Group	Athlete	Nationality	Result	Notes
1	B	Leanid Charauko	Belarus	64.97	Q
2	A	Aleksander Tammert	Estonia	63.96	Q
3	A	Aliaksandr Malashevich	Belarus	62.94	Q
4	A	Mario Pestano	Spain	62.07	Q
5	B	Timo Sinervo	Finland	60.56	Q
6	B	Nick Petrucci	United States	60.41	Q
7	B	Roland Varga	Hungary	60.16	Q
8	A	Olgierd Stański	Poland	59.67	q
9	A	Jarred Rome	United States	59.45	q
10	B	Emeka Udechuku	Great Britain	58.67	q
11	A	Mika Loikkanen	Finland	58.40	q
12	B	Rutger Smith	Netherlands	58.15	q
13	B	Andrzej Krawczyk	Poland	57.62	
14	B	Gerd Kanter	Estonia	57.44	
15	A	Stefano Lomater	Italy	56.76	
16	A	Peter Elvy	Australia	52.80	
17	B	Chang Ming-huang	Chinese Taipei	51.14	
18	A	Walid Boudaoui	Algeria	48.28	
19	?	Erick Melendez	Peru	40.21	
20	?	Dumisani Fakudze	Swaziland	38.86	

=== Final ===
Rank	Athlete	Nationality	Result	Notes
1st place, gold medalist(s)	Aleksander Tammert	Estonia	65.19	
2nd place, silver medalist(s)	Leanid Charauko	Belarus	63.15	
3rd place, bronze medalist(s)	Aliaksandr Malashevich	Belarus	62.81	
4	Roland Varga	Hungary	61.88	
5	Nick Petrucci	United States	60.50	
6	Olgierd Stański	Poland	60.16	
7	Timo Sinervo	Finland	59.64	
8	Jarred Rome	United States	59.59	
9	Mika Loikkanen	Finland	58.17	
10	Mario Pestano	Spain	58.05	
11	Rutger Smith	Netherlands	55.70	
12	Emeka Udechuku	Great Britain	55.58	
