= Athletics at the 2005 Summer Universiade – Men's discus throw =

The men's discus throw event at the 2005 Summer Universiade was held on 16–17 August in İzmir, Turkey.

== Medalists ==
Gold	Silver	Bronze
Gerd Kanter; Estonia	Omar Ahmed El Ghazaly; Egypt	Gábor Máté; Hungary

== Results ==
=== Qualification ===
Rank	Group	Athlete	Nationality	Result	Notes
1	B	Gábor Máté	Hungary	62.59	Q
2	B	Aliaksandr Malashevich	Belarus	60.34	Q
3	B	Johannes van Wyk	South Africa	60.15	Q
4	A	Omar Ahmed El Ghazaly	Egypt	59.87	Q
5	A	Wu Tao	China	59.87	Q
6	B	Gerd Kanter	Estonia	59.52	Q
7	A	Abbas Samimi	Iran	58.87	q
8	B	Roland Varga	Hungary	58.82	q
9	B	Vadim Hranovschi	Moldova	57.75	q
10	A	Märt Israel	Estonia	57.74	q
11	A	Dzmitry Sivakou	Belarus	57.36	q
12	B	Gerhard Mayer	Austria	57.26	q
13	A	Stefanos Konstas	Greece	57.17	
14	A	Oleksiy Semenov	Ukraine	56.74	
15	B	Jorge Grave	Portugal	53.54	
16	B	Daniel Vanek	Slovakia	53.53	
17	A	Bogdan Pishchalnikov	Russia	52.11	
18	A	Jim Steacy	Canada	49.50	
19	?	Peter Berling	Denmark	46.30	
20	?	Kamil Ulas Övünc	Turkey	45.52	
21	A	Salesi Ahokovi	Tonga	44.19	
22	?	Rasheed Saif Al-Makbali	United Arab Emirates	42.71	
23	?	Mohammed Omar Al-Khatib	United Arab Emirates	40.16	
24	?	Mario Mifsud	Malta	33.16	
	B	Yevgeniy Labutov	Kazakhstan	NM	

=== Final ===
Rank	Athlete	Nationality	#1	#2	#3	#4	#5	#6	Result	Notes
1st place, gold medalist(s)	Gerd Kanter	Estonia	63.25	x	63.71	65.29	x	64.02	65.29	
2nd place, silver medalist(s)	Omar Ahmed El Ghazaly	Egypt	58.54	57.49	x	57.92	59.94	62.68	62.68	
3rd place, bronze medalist(s)	Gábor Máté	Hungary	58.50	59.66	x	61.25	61.91	x	61.91	
4	Roland Varga	Hungary	x	58.19	60.44	60.42	59.65	61.38	61.38	
5	Aliaksandr Malashevich	Belarus	57.94	61.18	x	57.96	x	x	61.18	
6	Johannes van Wyk	South Africa	60.55	x	60.05	58.58	56.89	57.35	60.55	
7	Wu Tao	China	x	59.67	x	x	59.59	59.17	59.67	
8	Vadim Hranovschi	Moldova	57.72	59.48	56.11	57.81	56.96	58.32	59.48	
9	Gerhard Mayer	Austria	58.29	x	57.25				58.29	
10	Abbas Samimi	Iran	57.91	56.72	54.21				57.91	
11	Märt Israel	Estonia	56.43	57.63	x				57.63	
	Dzmitry Sivakou	Belarus	x	x	x				NM	
