= 1994 World Junior Championships in Athletics – Men's discus throw =

The men's discus throw event at the 1994 World Junior Championships in Athletics was held in Lisbon, Portugal, at Estádio Universitário de Lisboa on 20 and 21 July. A 2 kg (senior implement) discus was used.

== Medalists ==
Gold	Frantz Kruger; South Africa
Silver	Julio Piñero; Argentina
Bronze	Timo Sinervo; Finland

== Results ==
=== Final ===
21 July

Rank	Name	Nationality	Attempts						Result	Notes
Rank	Name	Nationality	1	2	3	4	5	6	Result	Notes
1st place, gold medalist(s)	Frantz Kruger	South Africa	58.06	58.22	x	x	57.66	x	58.22	
2nd place, silver medalist(s)	Julio Piñero	Argentina	53.10	53.32	57.80	x	x	x	57.80	
3rd place, bronze medalist(s)	Timo Sinervo	Finland	55.16	56.46	55.66	56.76	56.52	55.74	56.76	
4	Andrzej Krawczyk	Poland	50.80	x	55.68	53.70	x	54.26	55.68	
5	Li Shaojie	China	53.48	x	x	55.58	x	54.34	55.58	
6	Róbert Fazekas	Hungary	52.88	51.70	53.24	x	51.54	x	53.24	
7	Doug Reynolds	United States	53.04	x	x	x	x	x	53.04	
8	Jason Tunks	Canada	48.64	48.76	52.44	x	x	51.88	52.44	
9	Alexis Paumier	Cuba	50.32	51.60	48.08				51.60	
10	Ville Tiisanoja	Finland	x	50.86	50.86				50.86	
11	Stéphane Nativel	France	48.92	x	49.08				49.08	
12	Scott McPherren	United States	x	x	45.96				45.96	

=== Qualifications ===
20 Jul

==== Group A ====
Rank	Name	Nationality	Attempts			Result	Notes
Rank	Name	Nationality	1	2	3	Result	Notes
1	Li Shaojie	China	56.34	-	-	56.34	Q
2	Andrzej Krawczyk	Poland	51.96	54.88	-	54.88	Q
3	Julio Piñero	Argentina	51.16	53.60	-	53.60	Q
4	Scott McPherren	United States	x	52.74	53.22	53.22	Q
5	Ville Tiisanoja	Finland	52.92	46.60	52.62	52.92	q
6	Róbert Fazekas	Hungary	52.74	50.88	50.16	52.74	q
7	Jason Tunks	Canada	x	51.36	50.30	51.36	q
8	Athanásios Koukouzíkis	Greece	50.78	46.32	48.42	50.78	
9	Veljko Cegar	Yugoslavia	x	47.94	x	47.94	
10	Artyom Lavrov	Russia	47.48	47.28	x	47.48	
11	Pavel Gómez	Cuba	42.86	47.26	x	47.26	
12	Justin Anlezark	Australia	x	45.18	x	45.18	

==== Group B ====
Rank	Name	Nationality	Attempts			Result	Notes
Rank	Name	Nationality	1	2	3	Result	Notes
1	Timo Sinervo	Finland	55.82	-	-	55.82	Q
2	Frantz Kruger	South Africa	55.66	-	-	55.66	Q
3	Alexis Paumier	Cuba	52.24	x	x	52.24	q
4	Stéphane Nativel	France	50.38	51.64	47.12	51.64	q
5	Doug Reynolds	United States	x	x	51.18	51.18	q
6	Alexander Forst	Germany	x	44.76	50.16	50.16	
7	Zoltán Bangó	Hungary	45.84	49.34	48.84	49.34	
8	Mikhail Korovin	Russia	48.64	49.14	48.64	49.14	
9	Guillermo Heredia	Mexico	48.18	48.60	46.84	48.60	
10	Costantino Cattaneo	Italy	42.28	47.96	47.62	47.96	
11	Linus Bernhult	Sweden	44.80	45.66	46.68	46.68	
12	Jorge Vázquez	Paraguay	37.24	38.70	34.74	38.70	

== Participation ==
According to an unofficial count, 24 athletes from 19 countries participated in the event.

- Argentina (1)
- Australia (1)
- Canada (1)
- China (1)
- Cuba (2)
- Finland (2)
- France (1)
- Germany (1)
- Greece (1)
- Hungary (2)
- Italy (1)
- Mexico (1)
- Paraguay (1)
- Poland (1)
- Russia (2)
- South Africa (1)
- Sweden (1)
- United States (2)
- Yugoslavia (1)
