= 1998 World Junior Championships in Athletics – Men's discus throw =

The men's discus throw event at the 1998 World Junior Championships in Athletics was held in Annecy, France, at Parc des Sports on 29 and 30 July. A 2 kg (senior implement) discus was used.

== Medalists ==
| Gold | Zoltán Kővágó; Hungary |
| Silver | Emeka Udechuku; United Kingdom |
| Bronze | Gábor Máté; Hungary |

== Results ==
=== Final ===
30 July

| Rank | Name | Nationality | Attempts | | | | | | Result | Notes |
| Rank | Name | Nationality | 1 | 2 | 3 | 4 | 5 | 6 | Result | Notes |
|---|---|---|---|---|---|---|---|---|---|---|
| 1st place, gold medalist(s) | Zoltán Kővágó | Hungary | x | 57.35 | 53.90 | 55.93 | 56.80 | 59.36 | 59.36 | |
| 2nd place, silver medalist(s) | Emeka Udechuku | United Kingdom | 56.10 | x | 55.91 | 55.44 | 57.99 | 57.39 | 57.99 | |
| 3rd place, bronze medalist(s) | Gábor Máté | Hungary | 55.71 | 56.96 | 55.95 | 56.09 | 56.29 | 51.91 | 56.96 | |
| 4 | Jeremy Allen | United States | 55.19 | x | 55.82 | 55.10 | 55.60 | 56.55 | 56.55 | |
| 5 | Johannes van Wyk | South Africa | 54.54 | 55.35 | 55.78 | 55.96 | x | 54.44 | 55.96 | |
| 6 | Carl Myerscough | United Kingdom | 48.06 | 55.43 | 51.27 | 55.75 | 53.37 | 55.60 | 55.75 | |
| 7 | Janus Robberts | South Africa | 55.57 | 55.19 | x | 53.74 | x | 55.63 | 55.63 | |
| 8 | Rashid Al-Dosari | Qatar | 53.30 | 52.21 | 51.64 | 51.90 | 52.24 | x | 53.30 | |
| 9 | Yan Xiaoming | China | x | 52.75 | x | | | | 52.75 | |
| 10 | Scott Moser | United States | x | 50.54 | 52.69 | | | | 52.69 | |
| 11 | Peter Elvy | Australia | x | 45.47 | 50.41 | | | | 50.41 | |
| 12 | Petri Hakala | Finland | 48.51 | x | 49.23 | | | | 49.23 | |

=== Qualifications ===
29 Jul

==== Group A ====
| Rank | Name | Nationality | Attempts | | | Result | Notes |
| Rank | Name | Nationality | 1 | 2 | 3 | Result | Notes |
|---|---|---|---|---|---|---|---|
| 1 | Carl Myerscough | United Kingdom | 55.93 | - | - | 55.93 | Q |
| 2 | Zoltán Kővágó | Hungary | 55.48 | - | - | 55.48 | Q |
| 3 | Scott Moser | United States | 55.27 | - | - | 55.27 | Q |
| 4 | Yan Xiaoming | China | x | 53.42 | - | 53.42 | Q |
| 5 | Peter Elvy | Australia | 50.87 | x | 53.28 | 53.28 | Q |
| 6 | Janus Robberts | South Africa | 53.05 | - | - | 53.05 | Q |
| 7 | Petri Hakala | Finland | 52.15 | 52.48 | x | 52.48 | q |
| 8 | Antonín Žalský | Czech Republic | 48.53 | 44.51 | x | 48.53 | |
| 9 | Wael Mohd | Qatar | 46.75 | 45.08 | 48.23 | 48.23 | |
| 10 | Marcin Szeszula | Poland | 47.47 | 46.35 | 48.20 | 48.20 | |
| 11 | Tommaso Mattei | Italy | 46.34 | 47.65 | 45.15 | 47.65 | |
| 12 | Loy Martínez | Cuba | 45.88 | 47.59 | x | 47.59 | |
| 13 | Juan Rosete | Portugal | 46.90 | 47.00 | 46.73 | 47.00 | |
| 14 | Stefanos Hatzinikolaou | Greece | 38.92 | 43.26 | 44.60 | 44.60 | |

==== Group B ====
| Rank | Name | Nationality | Attempts | | | Result | Notes |
| Rank | Name | Nationality | 1 | 2 | 3 | Result | Notes |
|---|---|---|---|---|---|---|---|
| 1 | Emeka Udechuku | United Kingdom | 57.39 | - | - | 57.39 | Q |
| 2 | Jeremy Allen | United States | 57.12 | - | - | 57.12 | Q |
| 3 | Gábor Máté | Hungary | 49.21 | 50.42 | 56.80 | 56.80 | Q |
| 4 | Johannes van Wyk | South Africa | 52.87 | 53.47 | - | 53.47 | Q |
| 5 | Rashid Al-Dosari | Qatar | 50.74 | 49.94 | 52.05 | 52.05 | q |
| 6 | Ilya Kostin | Russia | 51.91 | x | 51.80 | 51.91 | |
| 7 | Lai Chaohui | China | 50.80 | 47.04 | 49.53 | 50.80 | |
| 8 | Julián Angulo | Colombia | 49.66 | x | 46.42 | 49.66 | |
| 9 | Matija Jakopovic | Croatia | 49.59 | 47.29 | 45.93 | 49.59 | |
| 10 | Scott Russell | Canada | 41.05 | 49.14 | 47.71 | 49.14 | |
| 11 | John Ledbrook | Australia | 47.03 | 47.76 | x | 47.76 | |
| 12 | Demetris Toumbas | Cyprus | x | 47.12 | x | 47.12 | |
| 13 | Mihai Timaru | Romania | 46.65 | 45.87 | 45.90 | 46.65 | |
| 14 | Łukasz Wenta | Poland | x | 46.07 | x | 46.07 | |

== Participation ==
According to an unofficial count, 28 athletes from 20 countries participated in the event.

- Australia (2)
- Canada (1)
- China (2)
- Colombia (1)
- Croatia (1)
- Cuba (1)
- Cyprus (1)
- Czech Republic (1)
- Finland (1)
- Greece (1)
- Hungary (2)
- Italy (1)
- Poland (2)
- Portugal (1)
- Qatar (2)
- Romania (1)
- Russia (1)
- South Africa (2)
- United Kingdom (2)
- United States (2)
