= Aliaksandr Malashevich =

Belarusian discus thrower

Personal information
- Born: 7 April 1977 (age 49) Hrodna, Soviet Union

Sport
- Sport: Track and field
Medal record
Representing Belarus
Summer Universiade
Bronze medal – third place	2001 Beijing	Discus throw
European U23 Championships
Gold medal – first place	1999 Gothenburg	Discus throw

Aliaksandr Malashevich (Belarusian: Аляксандар Малашэвіч; born 7 April 1977) is a Belarusian discus thrower. His personal best throw is 65.80 metres, achieved in June 2004 in Minsk.

He won the bronze medal at the 2001 Summer Universiade, finished sixth at the 2003 Summer Universiade and fifth at the 2005 Summer Universiade. He also competed at the 1999 World Championships and the 2004 Olympic Games without qualifying for the final round.

== Competition record ==
Year	Competition	Venue	Position	Notes
Representing Belarus
1995	European Junior Championships	Nyíregyháza, Hungary	19th (q)	46.46 m
1996	World Junior Championships	Sydney, Australia	21st (q)	46.40 m
1997	European U23 Championships	Turku, Finland	12th	52.34 m
1999	European U23 Championships	Gothenburg, Sweden	1st	63.78 m
1999	World Championships	Seville, Spain	35th (q)	53.20 m
2001	Summer Universiade	Beijing, China	3rd	62.81 m
2003	Summer Universiade	Daegu, South Korea	6th	58.99 m
2004	Olympic Games	Athens, Greece	23rd (q)	58.45 m
2005	Summer Universiade	İzmir, Turkey	5th	61.18 m
