= 2001 European Athletics U23 Championships – Men's discus throw =

The men's discus throw event at the 2001 European Athletics U23 Championships was held in Amsterdam, Netherlands, at Olympisch Stadion on 12 and 14 July.

== Medalists ==
Gold	Zoltán Kővágó; Hungary
Silver	Heinrich Seitz; Germany
Bronze	Gábor Máté; Hungary

== Results ==
=== Final ===
14 July

Rank	Name	Nationality	Attempts						Result	Notes
Rank	Name	Nationality	1	2	3	4	5	6	Result	Notes
1st place, gold medalist(s)	Zoltán Kővágó	Hungary	x	63.85	x	x	x	–	63.85	CR
2nd place, silver medalist(s)	Heinrich Seitz	Germany	56.07	57.79	56.20	59.50	57.98	57.09	59.50	
3rd place, bronze medalist(s)	Gábor Máté	Hungary	57.32	55.72	59.45	57.74	54.15	x	59.45	
4	Ilya Kostin	Russia	x	59.04	x	x	58.75	54.85	59.04	
5	Gerd Kanter	Estonia	53.65	55.44	56.94	x	x	57.73	57.73	
6	Mikko Kyyrö	Finland	57.67	54.24	x	x	x	x	57.67	
7	Emeka Udechuku	Great Britain	x	55.34	x	56.31	56.54	57.25	57.25	
8	Petri Hakala	Finland	55.86	x	x	x	56.37	x	56.37	
9	Janne Hummastenniemi	Finland	52.40	54.61	55.21				55.21	
10	Gerhard Mayer	Austria	x	53.30	x				53.30	
11	Matej Gašaj	Slovakia	51.90	x	x				51.90	
12	Andrea Nicoletti	Italy	50.46	49.96	48.17				50.46	

=== Qualifications ===
12 July
Qualifying 57.00 or 12 best to the Final

==== Group A ====
Rank	Name	Nationality	Result	Notes
1	Zoltán Kővágó	Hungary	59.72	Q
2	Ilya Kostin	Russia	58.47	Q
3	Heinrich Seitz	Germany	58.19	Q
4	Gerd Kanter	Estonia	57.60	Q
5	Petri Hakala	Finland	57.07	Q
6	Andrea Nicoletti	Italy	53.20	q
7	Gaute Myklebust	Norway	52.16	
8	Aukusitino Hoatau	France	49.61	
9	Georgios Arestis	Cyprus	49.55	

==== Group B ====
Rank	Name	Nationality	Result	Notes
1	Gábor Máté	Hungary	59.62	Q
2	Mikko Kyyrö	Finland	57.84	Q
3	Matej Gašaj	Slovakia	56.35	q
4	Emeka Udechuku	Great Britain	54.51	q
5	Janne Hummastenniemi	Finland	52.57	q
6	Gerhard Mayer	Austria	52.20	q
7	Mihai Timaru	Romania	52.00	
8	Manuel Florido	Spain	51.73	
9	Māris Urtāns	Latvia	49.40	
10	Óðinn Björn Þorsteinsson	Iceland	46.40	

== Participation ==
According to an unofficial count, 19 athletes from 16 countries participated in the event.

- Austria (1)
- Cyprus (1)
- Estonia (1)
- Finland (3)
- France (1)
- Germany (1)
- Great Britain (1)
- Hungary (2)
- Iceland (1)
- Italy (1)
- Latvia (1)
- Norway (1)
- Romania (1)
- Russia (1)
- Slovakia (1)
- Spain (1)
