= Jorge Balliengo =

Argentine discus thrower

Personal information
- Born: 5 January 1978 (age 48) Rosario, Santa Fe, Argentina

Sport
- Sport: Track and field
Medal record
Representing Argentina
South American Championships
Gold medal – first place	2005 Cali	Discus throw
Gold medal – first place	2006 Tunja	Discus throw
Silver medal – second place	2003 Barquisimeto	Discus throw
Silver medal – second place	2009 Lima	Discus throw

Jorge Esteban Balliengo (born 5 January 1978) is an Argentine discus thrower. He became South American champion in 2005. He also competed at the 2005 World Championships without qualifying for the final round.

Balliengo's personal best throw is 66.32 metres, achieved in April 2006 in Rosario. This is the current Argentine and South American record.

== Achievements ==
Year	Competition	Venue	Position	Event	Notes
Representing Argentina
1994	South American Youth Championships	Cochabamba, Bolivia	5th	High jump	1.88 m
1996	South American Junior Championships	Bucaramanga, Colombia	3rd	High jump	2.09 m
1997	South American Junior Championships	San Carlos, Uruguay	4th	High jump	1.95 m
2003	South American Championships	Barquisimeto, Venezuela	2nd	Discus throw	55.22 m
2003	Pan American Games	Santo Domingo, Dominican Republic	5th	Discus throw	59.39 m
2004	Ibero-American Championships	Huelva, Spain	3rd	Discus throw	59.24 m
2005	South American Championships	Cali, Colombia	1st	Discus throw	60.97 m
2005	World Championships	Helsinki, Finland	22nd (q)	Discus throw	60.40 m
2006	Ibero-American Championships	Ponce, Puerto Rico	1st	Discus throw	59.62 m
2006	South American Championships	Tunja, Colombia	1st	Discus throw	60.19 m
2008	Ibero-American Championships	Iquique, Chile	1st	Discus throw	59.43 m
2008	Olympic Games	Beijing, China	30th (q)	Discus throw	58.82 m
2009	South American Championships	Lima, Peru	2nd	Discus throw	58.04 m
2009	World Championships	Berlin, Germany	23rd (q)	Discus throw	59.19 m
2010	Ibero-American Championships	San Fernando, Spain	6th	Discus throw	56.59 m
2011	South American Championships	Buenos Aires, Argentina	5th	Discus throw	56.82 m
2011	Pan American Games	Guadalajara, Mexico	10th	Discus throw	51.93 m
2012	Ibero-American Championships	Barquisimeto, Venezuela	6th	Discus throw	55.88 m
