= Mario Pestano =

Spanish discus thrower

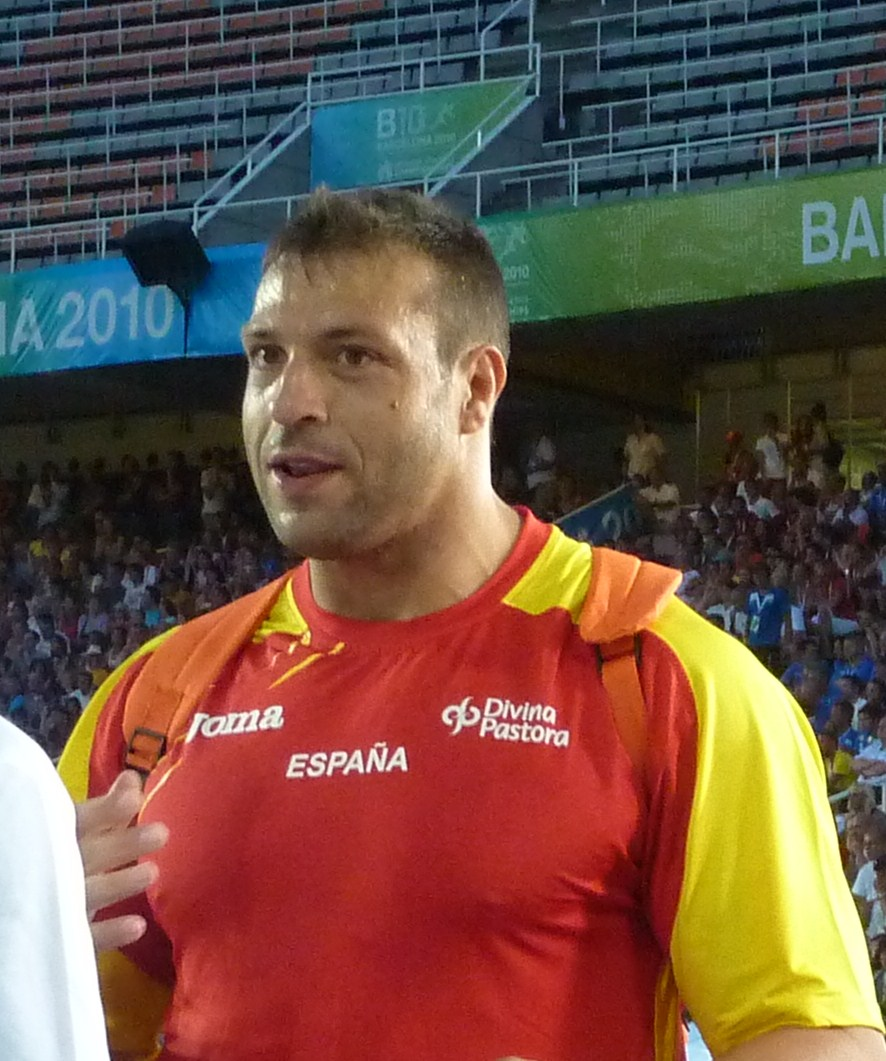
- Mario Pestano in 2010.

Personal information
- Born: 8 April 1978 (age 48) Tenerife, Spain
- Height: 1.94 m (6 ft 4 1/2 in)
- Weight: 120 kg (265 lb)

Sport
- Country: Spain
- Sport: Athletics
- Event: Discus
Medal record
Representing Spain
European U23 Championships
Bronze medal – third place	1999 Gothenburg	Discus throw
Mediterranean Games
Gold medal – first place	2005 Almeria	Discus throw
Bronze medal – third place	2001 Tunis	Discus throw

Mario Pestano García (born 8 April 1978) is a retired male Spanish discus thrower. His personal best throw is 69.50, achieved on 27 July 2008 in Santa Cruz de Tenerife.

== Achievements ==
Year	Competition	Venue	Position	Notes
Representing Spain
1997	European Junior Championships	Ljubljana, Slovenia	11th	47.60 m
1999	Universiade	Palma de Mallorca, Spain	11th	55.77 m
1999	European U23 Championships	Gothenburg, Sweden	3rd	61.73 m
1999	World Championships	Seville, Spain	30th (q)	57.30 m
2000	Ibero-American Championships	Rio de Janeiro, Brazil	3rd	57.17 m
2001	World Championships	Edmonton, Canada	22nd (q)	56.58 m
2001	Universiade	Beijing, China	10th	58.05 m
2001	Mediterranean Games	Radès, Tunisia	3rd	63.71 m
2002	European Championships	Munich, Germany	4th	64.69 m
2003	World Championships	Paris, France	8th	64.39 m
2003	World Athletics Final	Monte Carlo, Monaco	8th	59.96 m
2004	Ibero-American Championships	Huelva, Spain	1st	63.84 m
2004	Olympic Games	Athens, Greece	12th	61.69 m
2004	World Athletics Final	Monte Carlo, Monaco	1st	64.11 m
2005	Mediterranean Games	Almería, Spain	1st	63.96 m
2005	World Championships	Helsinki, Finland	11th	62.75 m
2005	World Athletics Final	Monte Carlo, Monaco	6th	62.97 m
2006	European Championships	Gothenburg, Sweden	4th	64.84 m
2007	World Championships	Osaka, Japan	10th	62.70 m
2008	Olympic Games	Beijing, China	9th	63.42 m
2009	World Championships	Berlin, Germany	10th	62.76 m
2010	European Cup Winter Throwing	Arles, France	2nd	63.78 m
2010	Ibero-American Championships	San Fernando, Spain	1st	63.01 m
2010	European Championships	Barcelona, Spain	6th	64.51 m
2011	World Championships	Daegu, South Korea	11th	63.00 m
2012	European Championships	Helsinki, Finland	4th	63.87 m
2012	Olympic Games	London, United Kingdom	14th (q)	63.40 m
2013	World Championships	Moscow, Russia	12th	61.88 m
2014	European Championships	Zürich, Switzerland	6th	62.31 m
