= 1996 World Junior Championships in Athletics – Men's discus throw =

The men's discus throw event at the 1996 World Junior Championships in Athletics was held in Sydney, Australia, at International Athletic Centre on 21 and 22 August. A 2 kg (senior implement) discus was used.

== Medalists ==
Gold	Casey Malone; United States
Silver	Roland Várga; Hungary
Bronze	Frank Casañas; Cuba

== Results ==
=== Final ===
22 August

Rank	Name	Nationality	Attempts						Result	Notes
Rank	Name	Nationality	1	2	3	4	5	6	Result	Notes
1st place, gold medalist(s)	Casey Malone	United States	53.36	56.22	x	x	x	49.42	56.22	
2nd place, silver medalist(s)	Roland Várga	Hungary	53.14	52.66	55.20	51.68	47.62	54.56	55.20	
3rd place, bronze medalist(s)	Frank Casañas	Cuba	54.82	52.06	54.08	54.04	51.76	54.86	54.86	
4	Zoltán Kővágó	Hungary	49.82	49.52	x	52.64	53.72	52.94	53.72	
5	Ian Waltz	United States	x	51.84	x	52.02	53.16	49.58	53.16	
6	Nikolai Kovalenko	Ukraine	50.54	49.74	49.76	51.32	51.18	51.94	51.94	
7	Patrick Stang	Germany	50.52	51.14	48.68	x	51.86	x	51.86	
8	Sergey Pavliy	Russia	51.56	x	x	x	49.40	x	51.56	
9	Gjøran Sørli	Norway	47.54	46.08	48.44				48.44	
10	Stefan Kulla	Finland	x	47.74	43.08				47.74	
11	Marius Vornicu	Romania	47.54	x	47.26				47.54	
12	Yves Niaré	France	46.40	47.18	x				47.18	

=== Qualifications ===
21 Aug

==== Group A ====
Rank	Name	Nationality	Attempts			Result	Notes
Rank	Name	Nationality	1	2	3	Result	Notes
1	Casey Malone	United States	x	52.88	-	52.88	Q
2	Zoltán Kővágó	Hungary	49.46	52.30	-	52.30	Q
3	Frank Casañas	Cuba	52.22	-	-	52.22	Q
4	Nikolai Kovalenko	Ukraine	50.80	49.74	x	50.80	q
5	Marius Vornicu	Romania	49.82	49.88	49.00	49.88	q
6	Gjøran Sørli	Norway	48.84	48.00	44.34	48.84	q
7	Justin Anlezark	Australia	47.62	48.70	x	48.70	
8	Csaba Gulyas	Yugoslavia	48.52	47.60	x	48.52	
9	Miran Vodovnik	Slovenia	47.90	x	x	47.90	
10	Igor Tuchak	Russia	x	x	47.04	47.04	
11	Ion Emilianov	Moldova	46.30	x	x	46.30	
12	Joachim B. Olsen	Denmark	46.26	45.92	45.72	46.26	
13	Tarek Abderrahman Mahmoud	Egypt	43.10	x	x	43.10	

==== Group B ====
Rank	Name	Nationality	Attempts			Result	Notes
Rank	Name	Nationality	1	2	3	Result	Notes
1	Ian Waltz	United States	45.52	53.32	-	53.32	Q
2	Roland Várga	Hungary	53.32	-	-	53.32	Q
3	Sergey Pavliy	Russia	x	47.46	50.26	50.26	q
4	Yves Niaré	France	48.82	50.24	49.24	50.24	q
5	Stefan Kulla	Finland	49.16	47.86	46.84	49.16	q
6	Patrick Stang	Germany	46.64	48.84	45.02	48.84	q
7	Dariusz Slowik	Denmark	44.28	48.44	48.54	48.54	
8	Stéfanos Kónstas	Greece	48.00	48.46	x	48.46	
9	Christopher Gaviglio	Australia	x	48.32	x	48.32	
10	Erwin Simpelaar	Netherlands	44.26	x	48.30	48.30	
11	Aleksandr Malashevich	Belarus	43.42	46.40	43.48	46.40	
12	Petr Stehlík	Czech Republic	x	x	45.84	45.84	
13	Charles Winchester	Cook Islands	38.06	x	38.86	38.86	

== Participation ==
According to an unofficial count, 26 athletes from 21 countries participated in the event.

- Australia (2)
- Belarus (1)
- Cook Islands (1)
- Cuba (1)
- Czech Republic (1)
- Denmark (2)
- Egypt (1)
- Finland (1)
- France (1)
- Germany (1)
- Greece (1)
- Hungary (2)
- Moldova (1)
- Netherlands (1)
- Norway (1)
- Romania (1)
- Russia (2)
- Slovenia (1)
- Ukraine (1)
- United States (2)
- Yugoslavia (1)
