= 1999 European Athletics U23 Championships – Men's discus throw =

The men's discus throw event at the 1999 European Athletics U23 Championships was held in Gothenburg, Sweden, at Ullevi on 31 July and 1 August 1999.

== Medalists ==
Gold	Aleksandr Malashevich; Belarus
Silver	Roland Varga; Hungary
Bronze	Mario Pestano; Spain

== Results ==
=== Final ===
1 August

Rank	Name	Nationality	Attempts						Result	Notes
Rank	Name	Nationality	1	2	3	4	5	6	Result	Notes
1st place, gold medalist(s)	Aleksandr Malashevich	Belarus	53.97	59.54	60.02	61.07	63.78	x	63.78	CR
2nd place, silver medalist(s)	Roland Varga	Hungary	61.99	56.62	x	x	x	x	61.99	
3rd place, bronze medalist(s)	Mario Pestano	Spain	59.61	x	x	x	57.36	61.73	61.73	
4	Gábor Máté	Hungary	59.43	x	61.26	56.65	60.03	58.39	61.26	
5	Petri Hakala	Finland	56.54	54.95	58.08	x	57.21	59.26	59.26	
6	Zoltán Kővágó	Hungary	58.51	56.26	56.04	55.61	54.75	x	58.51	
7	Emeka Udechuku	Great Britain	57.87	54.72	x	57.85	x	57.68	57.87	
8	Patrick Stang	Germany	56.89	54.33	57.85	55.01	x	55.55	57.85	
9	Carl Myerscough	Great Britain	56.68	54.00	x				56.68	
10	Jörg Schulte	Germany	54.75	55.38	53.51				55.38	
11	Joachim Olsen	Denmark	54.86	53.99	54.97				54.97	
12	Yves Niaré	France	53.58	x	x				53.58	

=== Qualifications ===
31 July
Qualifying perf. 58.00 or 12 best to the Final

==== Group A ====
Rank	Name	Nationality	Result	Notes
1	Aleksandr Malashevich	Belarus	58.82	Q
2	Mario Pestano	Spain	58.78	Q
3	Jörg Schulte	Germany	55.88	q
4	Carl Myerscough	Great Britain	55.17	q
5	Emeka Udechuku	Great Britain	54.54	q
6	Zoltán Kővágó	Hungary	54.50	q
7	Čaba Guljaš	Yugoslavia	53.70	
8	Adam Doležel	Czech Republic	53.47	
9	Jean-Baptiste Tiercelin	France	52.72	
10	Gjøran Sørli	Norway	50.11	
	Demetris Toumbas	Cyprus	45.66	

==== Group B ====
Rank	Name	Nationality	Result	Notes
1	Roland Varga	Hungary	58.75	Q
2	Gábor Máté	Hungary	57.85	q
3	Petri Hakala	Finland	57.58	q
4	Patrick Stang	Germany	56.83	q
5	Joachim Olsen	Denmark	55.15	q
6	Yves Niaré	France	53.91	q
7	Janne Hummastenniemi	Finland	52.52	
8	Spiridon Arabatzis	Greece	52.45	
9	Dariusz Slowik	Denmark	51.17	
	Iván Tirado	Spain	NM	

== Participation ==
According to an unofficial count, 21 athletes from 13 countries participated in the event.

- Belarus (1)
- Cyprus (1)
- Czech Republic (1)
- Denmark (2)
- Finland (2)
- France (2)
- Germany (2)
- Great Britain (2)
- Greece (1)
- Hungary (3)
- Norway (1)
- Spain (2)
- Yugoslavia (1)
