= Wu Tao (discus thrower) =

Chinese discus thrower (born 1983)

Wu Tao 吴涛
Personal information
- Born: 3 October 1983 (age 42) Benxi, Liaoning, China
- Height: 1.90 m (6 ft 3 in)
- Weight: 105 kg (231 lb)

Achievements and titles
- Personal best: 64.28 m (210.9 ft)
Medal record
Representing China
Asian Games
| Gold medal – first place | 2002 Busan | Discus throw |
Asian Championships
| Gold medal – first place | 2003 Manila | Discus throw |
| Bronze medal – third place | 2009 Guangzhou | Discus throw |
East Asian Games
| Gold medal – first place | 2005 Macau | Discus throw |
World Junior Championships
| Gold medal – first place | 2002 Kingston | Discus throw |
Universiade
| Gold medal – first place | 2003 Daegu | Discus throw |

Wu Tao (simplified Chinese: 吴涛; traditional Chinese: 吳濤; pinyin: Wú Tāo; born October 3, 1983) is a Chinese discus thrower.

He won the 2002 World Junior Championships and the 2003 Summer Universiade and finished seventh at the 2005 Summer Universiade. On the regional level he won the 2003 Asian Championships and the 2002 Asian Games, and finished fifth at the 2006 Asian Games.

He competed at the 2004 Summer Olympics and the 2005 World Championships without reaching the finals.

His personal best throw is 64.28 metres, achieved in May 2005 in Chongqing. The Chinese record is currently held by Li Shaojie with 65.16 metres.

== International competitions ==
| Year | Competition | Venue | Position | Notes |
Representing China
| 2002 | World Junior Championships | Kingston, Jamaica | 1st | 64.51 m (1.75 kg) |
| 2002 | Asian Games | Busan, South Korea | 1st | 60.76 m |
| 2003 | Universiade | Daegu, South Korea | 1st | 62.32 m |
| 2003 | Asian Championships | Manila, Philippines | 1st | 61.43 m |
| 2004 | Olympic Games | Athens, Greece | 18th (q) | 60.60 m |
| 2005 | World Championships | Helsinki, Finland | 18th (q) | 61.75 m |
| 2005 | Universiade | İzmir, Turkey | 7th | 59.67 m |
| 2005 | East Asian Games | Macau | 1st | 61.74 m |
| 2006 | Asian Games | Doha, Qatar | 5th | 58.54 m |
| 2009 | Asian Championships | Guangzhou, China | 3rd | 59.27 m |
| 2014 | Asian Games | Incheon, South Korea | 8th | 56.67 m |
