= Oleksiy Semenov =

Ukrainian discus thrower

Personal information
- Full name: Oleksiy Serhiyovych Semenov
- Nationality: Ukraine
- Born: 27 June 1982 (age 44)
- Height: 1.98 m (6 ft 6 in)
- Weight: 118 kg (260 lb)

Sport
- Sport: Athletics
- Event: Discus throw
- Club: Dynamo Donetsk

Oleksiy Serhiyovych Semenov (Ukrainian: Олексій Сергійович Семенов; born June 27, 1982) is a Ukrainian discus thrower. He competed for the men's event at the 2008 Summer Olympics in Beijing, where he finished twenty-fourth in the qualification round, with a distance of 60.18 metres. His personal best in the outdoor season is 65.96 metres, which was further achieved on July 15, 2012 in Kyiv.

Semenov is currently a member of Dynamo Donetsk for track and field.

== Achievements ==
Year	Competition	Venue	Position	Event	Notes
1999	World Youth Championships	Bydgoszcz, Poland	9th	Discus throw (1.5 kg)	51.92 m
2001	European Junior Championships	Grosseto, Italy	8th	Discus throw	50.40 m
2003	European U23 Championships	Bydgoszcz, Poland	10th	Discus throw	54.16 m
2005	Universiade	İzmir, Turkey	14th (q)	Discus throw	56.74 m
2008	Olympic Games	Beijing, China	24th (q)	Discus throw	61.26 m
2009	European Team Championships	Leiria, Portugal	4th	Discus throw	59.79 m
2009	World Championships	Berlin, Germany	26th (q)	Discus throw	58.78 m
2010	European Championships	Barcelona, Spain	31st (q)	Discus throw	56.42 m
2011	European Team Championships	Stockholm, Sweden	8th	Discus throw	56.30 m
