= 2003 Asian Athletics Championships – Men's discus throw =

The men's discus throw event at the 2003 Asian Athletics Championships was held in Manila, Philippines on September 20.

== Results ==
Rank	Name	Nationality	Result	Notes
1st place, gold medalist(s)	Wu Tao	China	61.43	
2nd place, silver medalist(s)	Abbas Samimi	Iran	59.51	
3rd place, bronze medalist(s)	Anil Kumar	India	59.50	
4	Tulake Nuermaimaiti	China	59.48	SB
5	Khalid Habash Al-Suwaidi	Qatar	58.20	SB
6	Sultan Mubarak Al-Dawoodi	Saudi Arabia	57.36	
7	Shigeo Hatakeyama	Japan	55.39	
8	Ehsan Haddadi	Iran	54.40	SB
9	Talavou Alilima	Sri Lanka	50.11	
