= Gerhard Mayer =

Austrian discus thrower

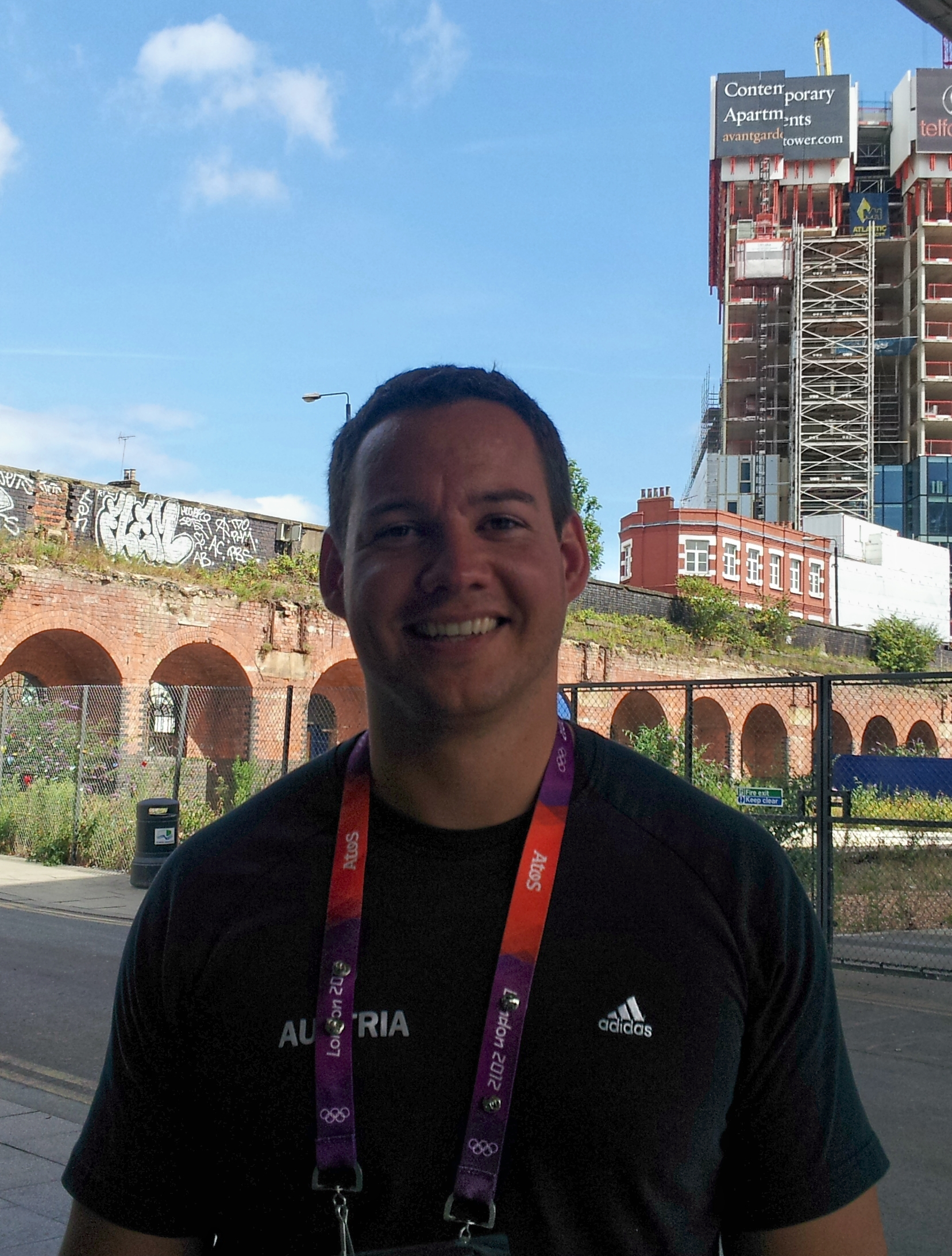
- Gerhard Mayer at the 2012 London Summer Olympics

Personal information
- Born: 20 May 1980 (age 46) Vienna, Austria
- Height: 1.91 m (6 ft 3 in)
- Weight: 109 kg (240 lb)

Sport
- Country: Austria
- Sport: Athletics
- Event: Discus
Medal record
Men's athletics
Representing Austria
European Games
Gold medal – first place	2015 Baku	Mixed team
- Updated on 12 August 2012

Gerhard Mayer (born 20 May 1980 in Vienna) is a male discus thrower from Austria.

He represented his native country at the 2008 Summer Olympics in Beijing, where he ended up in 18th place in the overall-rankings. He also competed at the 2012 Summer Olympics, finishing in 24th place. Mayer is best known for winning the gold medal in the men's discus event at the 2007 Summer Universiade in Bangkok, Thailand.

== Achievements ==
Year	Competition	Venue	Position	Notes
Representing Austria
1999	European Junior Championships	Riga, Latvia	6th	49.65 m
2001	European U23 Championships	Amsterdam, Netherlands	10th	53.30 m
2005	Universiade	İzmir, Turkey	9th	58.29 m
2006	European Championships	Gothenburg, Sweden	15th (q)	59.54 m
2007	Universiade	Bangkok, Thailand	1st	61.55 m
2008	Summer Olympics	Beijing, China	18th (q)	61.32 m
2009	World Championships	Berlin, Germany	8th	63.17 m
2010	European Championships	Barcelona, Spain	15th (q)	60.76 m
2011	World Championships	Daegu, South Korea	21st (q)	61.47 m
2012	European Championships	Helsinki, Finland	7th	62.85 m
2012	Summer Olympics	London, United Kingdom	24th (q)	60.81 m
2013	World Championships	Moscow, Russia	18th (q)	59.85 m
2014	European Championships	Zürich, Switzerland	15th (q)	60.78 m
2015	World Championships	Beijing, China	30th (q)	57.73 m
