= Frantz Kruger =

South African-born Finnish discus thrower

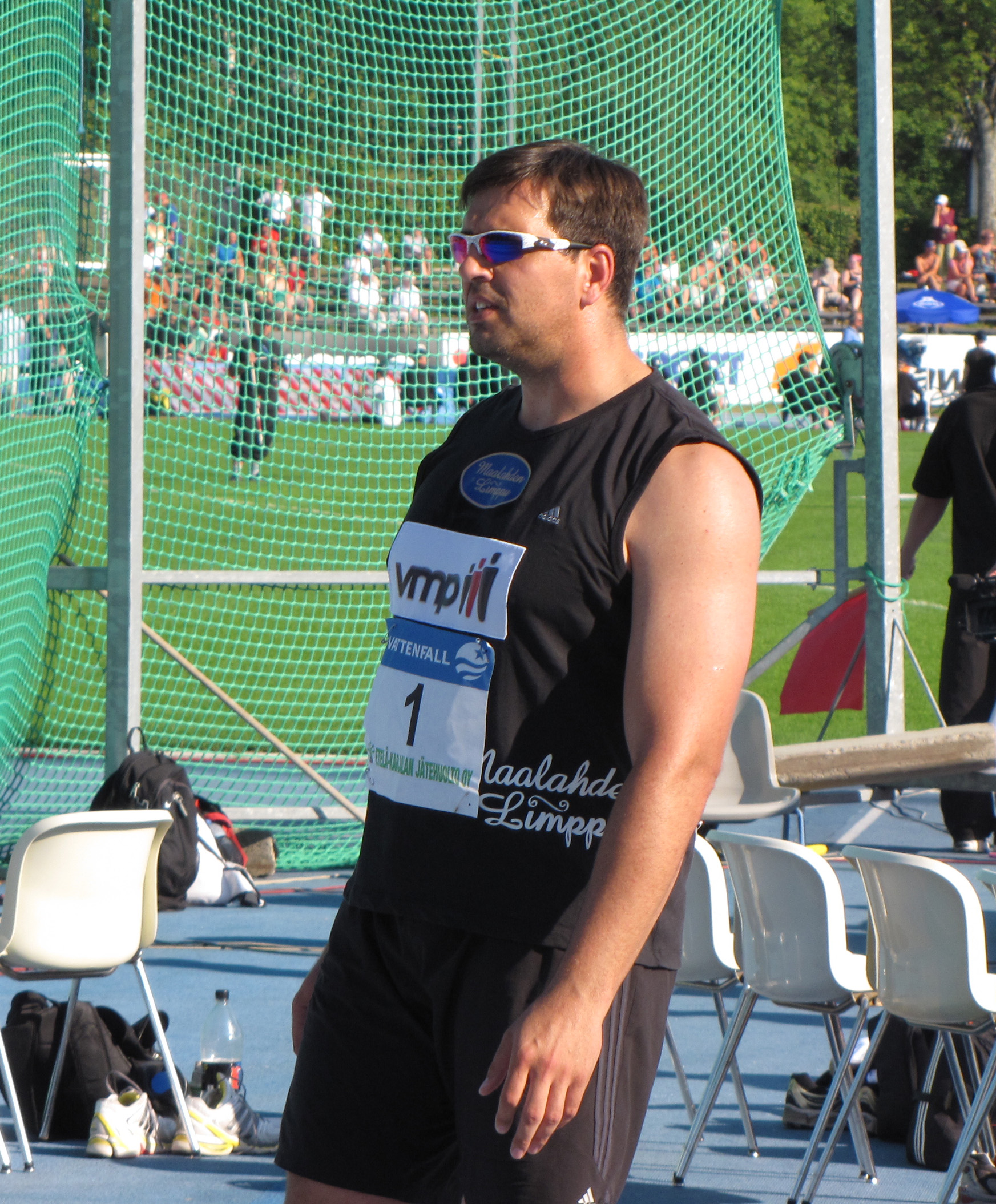
- Frantz Kruger in 2010

Personal information
- Born: 22 May 1975 (age 51) Kempton Park, South Africa

Sport
- Sport: Track and field
Medal record
Representing South Africa
Olympic Games
Bronze medal – third place	Sydney 2000	Discus throw
Commonwealth Games
Gold medal – first place	2002 Manchester	Discus throw
Silver medal – second place	1998 Kuala Lumpur	Discus throw
Summer Universiade
Gold medal – first place	1999 Palma de Mallorca	Discus throw
African Championships
Gold medal – first place	2004 Brazzaville	Discus throw

Frantz Kruger (born 22 May 1975) is a South African born Finnish discus thrower who won the Olympic bronze medal in 2000. He is also a double African champion. His personal best throw of 70.32 metres, achieved in May 2002 in Salon-de-Provence, is the current African record.

He was married to Finnish former triple jumper Heli Koivula-Kruger (divorced 2016), and received Finnish citizenship in 2007. Kruger has been available to represent Finland by a special permit from the government of IAAF since 20 August 2007. In international discus competition at Helsingborg, he set a new Finnish discus record, 69.97 metres.

== Competition record ==
Year	Competition	Venue	Position	Event	Notes
Representing South Africa
1994	African Junior Championships	Algiers, Algeria	1st	Shot put	14.17 m
1994	African Junior Championships	Algiers, Algeria	1st	Discus throw	55.86 m
1994	World Junior Championships	Lisbon, Portugal	1st	Discus throw	58.22 m
1997	Universiade	Catania, Italy	6th	Discus throw	61.64 m
1998	African Championships	Dakar, Senegal	1st	Discus throw	62.17 m
1998	Commonwealth Games	Kuala Lumpur, Malaysia	2nd	Discus throw	63.93 m
1999	Universiade	Palma de Mallorca, Spain	1st	Discus throw	66.90 m
1999	World Championships	Seville, Spain	17th (q)	Discus throw	62.02 m
1999	All-Africa Games	Johannesburg, South Africa	1st	Discus throw	61.02 m
2000	Olympic Games	Sydney, Australia	3rd	Discus throw	68.19 m
2001	World Championships	Edmonton, Canada	8th	Discus throw	65.27 m
2001	Goodwill Games	Brisbane, Australia	1st	Discus throw	67.84 m
2002	Commonwealth Games	Manchester, United Kingdom	1st	Discus throw	66.39 m
2003	World Championships	Paris, France	6th	Discus throw	65.26 m
2003	World Athletics Final	Monte Carlo, Monaco	7th	Discus throw	60.05 m
2004	Olympic Games	Athens, Greece	5th	Discus throw	64.34 m
2004	African Championships	Brazzaville, Republic of the Congo	1st	Discus throw	63.85 m
2004	World Athletics Final	Monte Carlo, Monaco	8th	Discus throw	59.65 m
2005	World Championships	Helsinki, Finland	6th	Discus throw	64.23 m
2005	World Athletics Final	Monte Carlo, Monaco	5th	Discus throw	63.19 m
Representing Finland
2007	World Championships	Osaka, Japan	19th (q)	Discus throw	60.72 m
2008	Olympic Games	Beijing, China	11th	Discus throw	61.98 m
2009	World Championships	Berlin, Germany	12th	Discus throw	59.77 m
2010	European Championships	Barcelona, Spain	19th (q)	Discus throw	59.55 m

== See also ==
- List of eligibility transfers in athletics
