= Peter Elvy =

Australian discus thrower

Peter Elvy (born 3 June 1980) is a retired Australian discus thrower.

He finished eleventh at the 1998 World Junior Championships, and eighth at the 2002 World Cup. He also competed at the 2001 Summer Universiade without reaching the final.

Elvy became Australian champion in 2002 and 2003. His personal best throw was 60.45 metres, achieved in August 2000 in Sydney.
