= Frank Casañas =

Spanish discus thrower (born 1978)

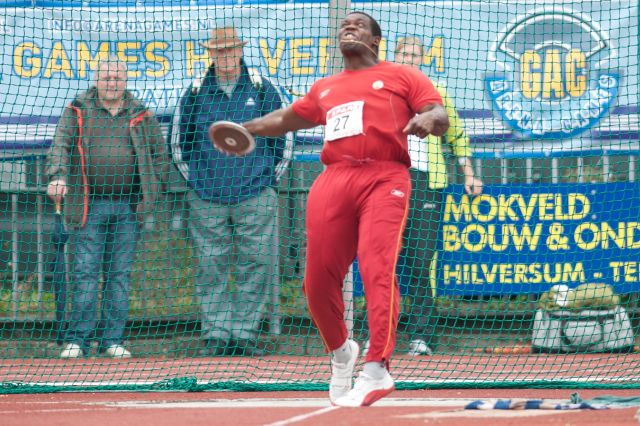
- Casañas at the 2010 Arena Games

Personal information
- Full name: Yennifer Frank Casañas Hernández
- Nationality: Cuban, Spanish
- Born: 18 October 1978 (age 48) Cuba
- Height: 1.87 m (6 ft 2 in)
- Weight: 117 kg (258 lb)

Sport
- Country: Cuba, Spain
- Sport: Athletics
- Event: Discus
Medal record
CAC Junior Championships (U20)
| Gold medal – first place | 1996 San Salvador | Discus throw |
- Updated on 12 August 2012

Yennifer Frank Casañas Hernández (born 18 October 1978) is a discus thrower. Born in Cuba, he represented his country of birth until May 2008, then Spain.

== Career ==
In the 2008 Olympic Games he competed for Spain, reaching the fifth position in the final.

His personal best throw is 67.91 metres, which he achieved in June 2008 in Castellón.

== Achievements ==
| Year | Competition | Venue | Position | Event | Notes |
Representing Cuba
| 1996 | Central American and Caribbean Junior Championships (U-20) | San Salvador, El Salvador | 1st | Discus | 53.08 m |
| 1996 | World Junior Championships | Sydney, Australia | 3rd | Discus | 54.86 m |
| 1997 | Central American and Caribbean Championships | San Juan, Puerto Rico | 3rd | Discus | 55.32 m |
| 1998 | Central American and Caribbean Games | Maracaibo, Venezuela | 2nd | Discus | 59.38 m |
| 1999 | Pan American Games | Winnipeg, Canada | 4th | Discus | 60.20 m |
| 2000 | Ibero-American Championships | Rio de Janeiro, Brazil | 3rd | Discus | 59.87 m |
| 2000 | Olympic Games | Sydney, Australia | 24th | Discus | 60.84 m |
| 2003 | Pan American Games | Santo Domingo, Dom. Rep. | 2nd | Discus | 62.61 m |
| 2003 | World Championships | Paris, France | 11th (q) | Discus | 59.99 m |
| 2004 | Olympic Games | Athens, Greece | 17th | Discus | 60.60 m |
| 2005 | World Championships | Helsinki, Finland | 10th (q) | Discus | 60.94 m |
Representing Spain
| 2008 | Olympic Games | Beijing, China | 5th | Discus | 66.49 m |
| 2009 | Mediterranean Games | Pescara, Italy | 1st | Discus | 65.58 m GR |
| 2009 | World Championships | Berlin, Germany | 7th (q) | Discus | 61.10 m |
| 2010 | Ibero-American Championships | San Fernando, Spain | 2nd | Discus | 62.08 m |
| 2010 | European Championships | Barcelona, Spain | 11th | Discus | 62.15 m |
| 2012 | European Championships | Helsinki, Finland | 5th | Discus | 63.60 m |
| 2012 | Olympic Games | London, United Kingdom | 7th | Discus | 65.56 m |
| 2013 | World Championships | Moscow, Russia | 9th | Discus | 62.89 m |
| 2014 | European Championships | Zürich, Switzerland | 8th | Discus | 61.47 m |
| 2016 | European Championships | Amsterdam, Netherlands | 24th (q) | Discus | 59.06 m |
| 2016 | Olympic Games | Rio de Janeiro, Brazil | 25th (q) | Discus | 59.96 m |
| 2018 | Mediterranean Games | Tarragona, Spain | 10th | Discus | 55.73 m |
