= Athletics at the 2002 Commonwealth Games – Men's discus throw =

Men's discus throw at the Commonwealth Games

The men's discus throw event at the 2002 Commonwealth Games was held on 26–27 July.

== Medalists ==
Gold	Silver	Bronze
Frantz Kruger; South Africa	Jason Tunks; Canada	Robert Weir; England

== Results ==
=== Qualification ===
Qualification: 60.00 m (Q) or at least 12 best (q) qualified for the final.

Rank	Athlete	Nationality	#1	#2	#3	Result	Notes
1	Frantz Kruger	South Africa	66.25			66.25	Q, GR
2	Jason Tunks	Canada	59.87	–	–	59.87	q
3	Glen Smith	England	59.30	–	–	59.30	q
4	Robert Weir	England	59.14	–	–	59.14	q
5	Chima Ugwu	Nigeria	54.41	58.48	–	58.48	q
6	Janus Robberts	South Africa	57.49	x	x	57.49	q
7	Emeka Udechuku	England	55.40	54.41	55.72	55.72	q
8	Kevin Brown	Jamaica	52.09	52.27	54.74	54.74	q
9	Georgios Arestis	Cyprus	x	50.09	53.36	53.36	q
10	Lee Newman	Wales	52.88	52.81	x	52.88	q
11	Petros Mitsides	Cyprus	46.87	x	50.48	50.48	q
12	Ihtsham Ul Haq	Pakistan	47.75	46.09	x	47.75	q
13	Anthony Soalla-Bell	Sierra Leone	x	37.05	44.75	44.75	NR
13	Robert Kidd	Belize	x	30.09	33.93	33.93	
	Eric Koo Wan Siong	Mauritius	x	x	x	NM	
	Elvis Smith	Turks and Caicos Islands	x	x	x	NM	

=== Final ===
Rank	Athlete	Nationality	#1	#2	#3	#4	#5	#6	Result	Notes
1st place, gold medalist(s)	Frantz Kruger	South Africa	65.67	66.39	65.12	64.61	x	x	66.39	GR
2nd place, silver medalist(s)	Jason Tunks	Canada	59.37	62.61	x	–	x	–	62.61	
3rd place, bronze medalist(s)	Robert Weir	England	57.86	59.24	x	58.05	x	58.42	59.24	
4	Chima Ugwu	Nigeria	59.19	x	58.61	x	x	x	59.19	
5	Glen Smith	England	57.49	57.52	x	x	x	x	57.52	
6	Emeka Udechuku	England	55.15	57.33	x	56.32	55.85	x	57.33	
7	Janus Robberts	South Africa	56.98	57.02	x	x	55.50	x	57.02	
8	Lee Newman	Wales	53.81	x	x	53.06	52.71	x	53.81	
9	Kevin Brown	Jamaica	52.04	52.51	51.59				52.51	
10	Petros Mitsides	Cyprus	x	52.36	49.68				52.36	
11	Georgios Arestis	Cyprus	48.06	x	51.14				51.14	
12	Ihtsham Ul Haq	Pakistan	48.31	x	46.77				48.31	
