= Gábor Máté (athlete) =

Hungarian discus thrower (born 1979)

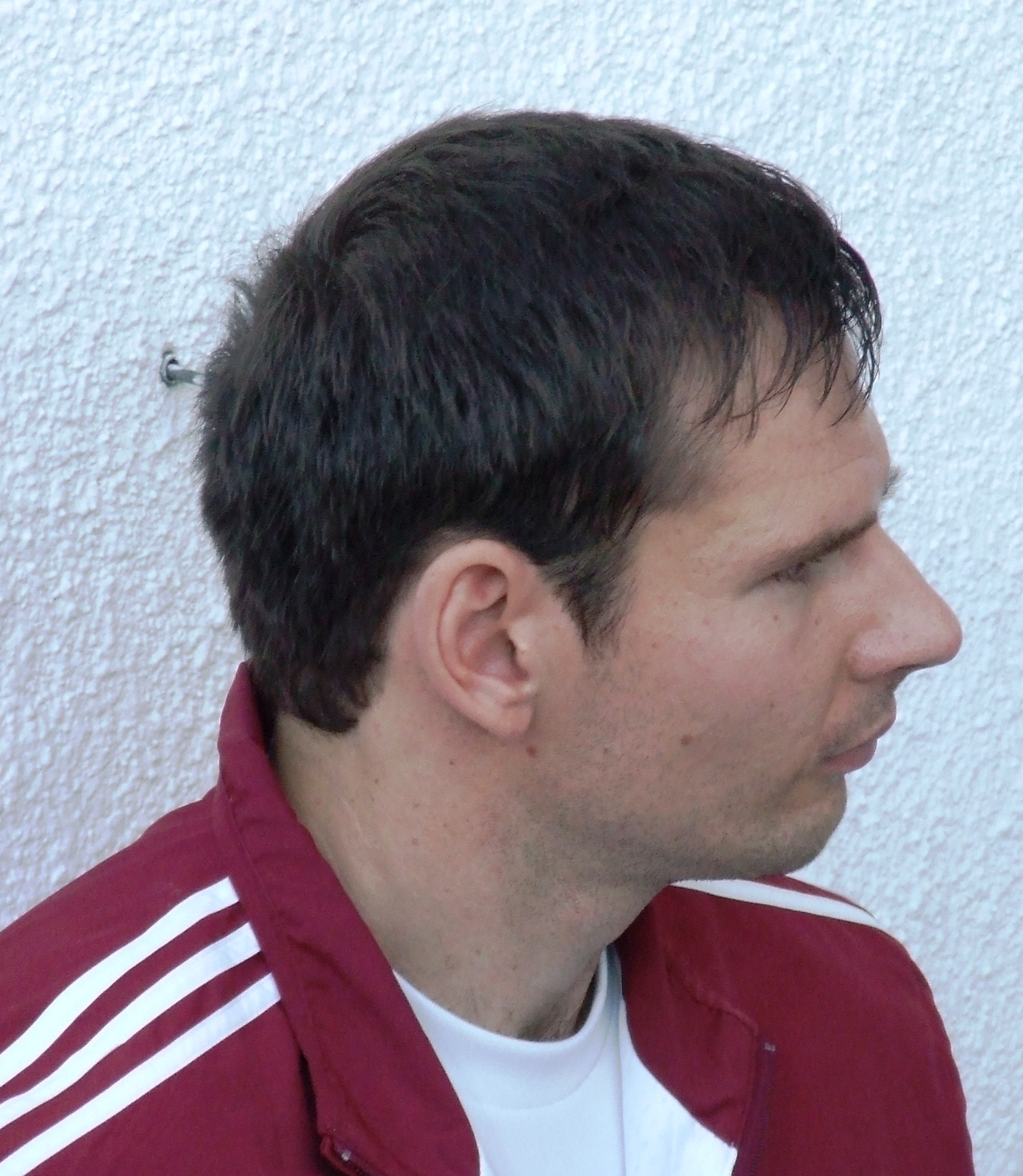
- Gábor Máté in Bydgoszcz 2007

Personal information
- Born: 9 February 1979 (age 47) Békéscsaba, Hungary

Sport
- Sport: Track and field
Medal record
Representing Hungary
Summer Universiade
Bronze medal – third place	2005 Izmir	Discus throw
European U23 Championships
Bronze medal – third place	2001 Amsterdam	Discus throw
World Junior Championships
Bronze medal – third place	1998 Annecy	Discus throw

Gábor Máté (born 9 February 1979) is a Hungarian discus thrower. He currently resides in Mobile, Alabama, United States.

His personal best throw is 66.54 metres, achieved in April 2000 in Walnut.

Competing for the Auburn Tigers track and field program, he won an NCAA title and set an NCAA record in the discus.

== Competition record ==
Year	Competition	Venue	Position	Event	Notes
Representing Hungary
1997	European Junior Championships	Ljubljana, Slovenia	19th (q)	Discus	46.52 m
1998	World Junior Championships	Annecy, France	3rd	Discus	56.96 m
1999	Universiade	Palma, Spain	12th	Discus	55.59 m
1999	European U23 Championships	Gothenburg, Sweden	4th	Discus	61.26 m
2000	Olympic Games	Sydney, Australia	23rd (q)	Discus	60.86 m
2001	European U23 Championships	Amsterdam, Netherlands	16th (q)	Shot put	17.24 m
2001	European U23 Championships	Amsterdam, Netherlands	3rd	Discus	59.45 m
2003	World Championships	Paris, France	–	Discus	NM
2004	Olympic Games	Athens, Greece	11th	Discus	57.84 m
2005	World Championships	Helsinki, Finland	26th (q)	Discus	58.97 m
2005	Universiade	İzmir, Turkey	3rd	Discus	61.91 m
2006	European Championships	Gothenburg, Sweden	12th	Discus	57.35 m
2007	World Championships	Osaka, Japan	5th	Discus	64.71 m
2008	Olympic Games	Beijing, PR China	13th (q)	Discus	62.44 m
