= Abbas Samimi =

Iranian discus thrower

Medal record

Representing Iran

Men's athletics

Asian Games
Silver medal – second place	2002 Busan	Discus throw

Asian Championships
Silver medal – second place	2000 Jakarta	Discus throw
Silver medal – second place	2002 Colombo	Discus throw
Silver medal – second place	2003 Manila	Discus throw
Bronze medal – third place	2005 Incheon	Discus throw
Bronze medal – third place	2007 Amman	Discus throw

West Asian Games
Gold medal – first place	1997 Tehran	Discus throw

Abbas Samimi (Persian: عباس صمیمی, born 9 June 1977) is a retired Iranian discus thrower.

His personal best throw is 64.98 metres, achieved in July 2004 in Manila. He is currently coaching his brothers, Mohammad and Mahmoud.

== Achievements ==
Year	Competition	Venue	Position	Notes
Representing Iran
1997	West Asian Games	Tehran, Iran	1st	52.90 m
1998	Asian Games	Bangkok, Thailand	5th	54.80 m
1999	World Championships	Seville, Spain	33rd (q)	54.21 m
2000	Asian Championships	Jakarta, Indonesia	2nd	58.27 m
2002	Asian Championships	Colombo, Sri Lanka	2nd	60.49 m
2002	Asian Games	Busan, South Korea	2nd	60.44 m
2003	Asian Championships	Manila, Philippines	2nd	59.51 m
2004	Olympic Games	Athens, Greece	28th (q)	57.57 m
2005	Islamic Solidarity Games	Mecca, Saudi Arabia	4th	58.22 m
2005	World Championships	Helsinki, Finland	23rd (q)	60.25 m
2005	Universiade	İzmir, Turkey	10th	57.91 m
2005	Asian Championships	Incheon, South Korea	3rd	59.08 m
2005	West Asian Games	Doha, Qatar	4th	57.47 m
2006	Asian Games	Doha, Qatar	4th	59.69 m
2007	Asian Championships	Amman, Jordan	3rd	61.29 m
2008	Olympic Games	Beijing, China	26th (q)	59.92 m
