= Emeka Udechuku =

British discus thrower

Personal information
- Nationality: British (English)
- Born: 10 July 1979 (age 47) Paddington, London, England
- Height: 179 cm (5 ft 10 in)
- Weight: 128 kg (282 lb)

Sport
- Sport: Athletics
- Events: Discus throw Shot put
- Club: Woodford Green with Essex Ladies
Medal record
Representing Great Britain
Summer Universiade
Bronze medal – third place	2003 Daegu	Discus throw
World Junior Championships
Silver medal – second place	1998 Annecy	Discus throw
European Junior Championships
Gold medal – first place	1997 Ljubljana	Discus throw

Chukwuemeka Young Udechuku // (born 10 July 1979) is an English discus thrower, who competed at the 2004 Summer Olympics. "Emeka" is a nickname for the Igbo name "Chukwuemeka" (meaning "God has done great").

== Biography ==
Udechuku attended Dulwich College and was the first British athlete to win a gold medal at U-20 level in the men's discus at the European Under 20 Championships.

At the 2004 Olympic Games in Athens he represented Great Britain in the discus throw event.

His personal best throw is 64.93 metres, achieved in July 2004 in Loughborough. This places him seventh among English discus throwers, behind Perriss Wilkins, Richard Slaney, Glen Smith, Carl Myerscough, Robert Weir and Bill Tancred.

He has a wife and three children, a daughter and two sons who are twins, they currently live in Essex.

== International competitions ==
Year	Competition	Venue	Position	Event	Notes
Representing Great Britain and England
1997	European U20 Championships	Ljubljana, Slovenia	1st	Discus throw	53.90 m
1998	World Junior Championships	Annecy, France	13th (q)	Shot put	16.42 m
1998	World Junior Championships	Annecy, France	2nd	Discus throw	57.99 m
1999	European U23 Championships	Gothenburg, Sweden	7th	Discus throw	57.87 m
2001	European U23 Championships	Amsterdam, Netherlands	7th	Discus throw	57.25 m
2001	Universiade	Beijing, China	11th	Shot put	16.77 m
2001	Universiade	Beijing, China	12th	Discus	55.58 m
2002	Commonwealth Games	Manchester, United Kingdom	9th	Shot put	17.54 m
2002	Commonwealth Games	Manchester, United Kingdom	6th	Discus throw	57.33 m
2003	Universiade	Daegu, South Korea	3rd	Discus throw	60.44 m
2004	Olympic Games	Athens, Greece	24th	Discus	58.41 m
2006	Commonwealth Games	Melbourne, Australia	7th	Discus	59.36 m
2010	Commonwealth Games	Delhi, India	5th	Discus	59.59 m
