= Mikko Kyyrö =

Finnish discus thrower (born 1980)

Mikko Tapio Kyyrö (born 12 July 1980 in Kerava) is a male discus thrower from Finland. His personal best throw is 64.14 metres, achieved on 29 June 2007 in Jalasjärvi.

In 2007 Kyyrö was found guilty of methylprednisolone doping. The sample was delivered on 5 August 2007 in an in-competition test at the national athletics championships. He only received a public warning.

== Achievements ==
Year	Competition	Venue	Position	Notes
Representing Finland
2001	European U23 Championships	Amsterdam, Netherlands	6th	57.67 m
2003	Summer Universiade	Daegu, South Korea	5th	59.33 m
2006	European Championships	Gothenburg, Sweden	18th	58.59 m
2007	World Championships	Osaka, Japan	14th	62.11 m
2009	Finnish Championships	Espoo, Finland	1st	61.25 m

== See also ==
- List of sportspeople sanctioned for doping offences
