= Hannes Kirchler =

Italian discus thrower

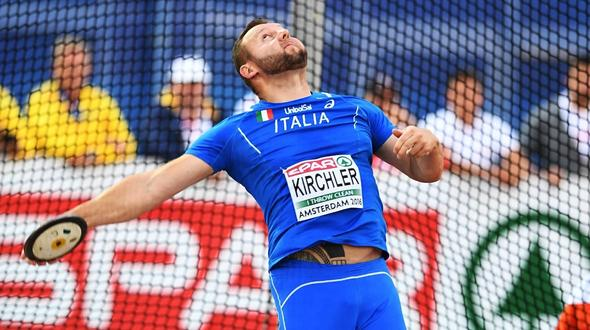

Personal information
- Nationality: Italian
- Born: 22 December 1978 (age 47) Merano, Italy
- Height: 1.94 m (6 ft 4 1/2 in)
- Weight: 115 kg (254 lb)

Sport
- Country: Italy
- Sport: Athletics
- Event: Discus throw
- Club: C.S. Carabinieri
- Coached by: Diego Fortuna

Achievements and titles
- Highest world ranking: Discus throw: 65.01 m (2007)
Medal record
Mediterranean Games
Bronze medal – third place	2018 Tarragona	Discus throw

Hannes Kirchler (born 22 December 1978 in Merano) is an Italian discus thrower.

== Biography ==
He is an eleven-time national champion in the discus throw, and a member of C.S. Carabinieri, an Italian military police sporting club. In 2007, Kirchler achieved his personal best throw of 65.01 metres at the Italian national championships in Bolzano.

Kirchler competed at the 2008 Summer Olympics in Beijing, and qualified for the men's discus throw.

His biggest achievement was to reach the Final at the 2016 European Athletics Championships in Amsterdam, Netherlands, where he threw 63.74m in the Qualifying and 60.18m in the Final. He finished tenth.

== Progression ==
Year	Performance	Venue	Date	World Ranking
2016	64.97 m	Tarquinia. Italy	15 June 2016	39°
2015	62.56 m	Castiglione della Pescaia. Italy	1 June 2015	56°
2014	63.33 m	Chula Vista. US	24 April 2014	48º
2013	62.69 m	Donnas. Italy	7 July 2013	56º
2012	62.04 m	La Jolla. US	28 April 2012	75º
2011	63.58 m	Tarquinia. Italy	9 June 2011	46º
2010	62.86 m	Donnas. Italy	10 July 2010	46º
2009	63.11 m	Donnas. Italy	12 July 2009	35º
2008	62.52 m	Formia. Italy	22 April 2008	57º
2007	65.01 m	Bolzano. Italy	4 June 2007	18º
2006	62.27 m	Donnas. Italy	18 June 2006	47º
2005	62.72 m	Milan. Italy	1 June 2005	47º
2004	62.13 m	Viterbo. Italy	20 May 2004	62º
2003	59.70 m	Vado Ligure. Italy	18 June 2003	98º
2002	59.85 m	Pergine Valsugana. Italy	6 July 2002	99º
2001	54.29 m	Trento. Italy	2 September 2001	230º
2000	55.80 m	Ravenna. Italy	24 June 2000	220º
1999	55.32 m	Borgo Valsugana. Italy	22 May 1999	243º
1998	53.70 m	{ Bolzano. Italy	1 June 1998	386º
1997	49.08 m	Grosseto. Italy	14 June 1997	472º
1996	45.42 m			

== Achievements ==
Year	Competition	Venue	Position	Event	Notes
2006	Mediterranean Games	Spain Almeria		NM	
2006	European Championships	Sweden Gothenburg	19º	56.78 m	
2007	World Championships	Japan Osaka	21º	60.34 m	
2007	Military World Games	India Hyderabad	5º	58.61 m	
2008	Olympic Games	China Beijing	33º	56.44 m	
2009	Mediterranean Games	Italy Pescara	4º	60.93 m	
2011	Military World Games	Brazil Rio de Janeiro	6º	57.46 m	
2014	European Championships	Switzerland Zürich	10º	60.18 m	
2016	European Championships	Netherlands Amsterdam	10º	60.18 m	

== National titles ==
Hannes Kirchler has won 13 times for the individual national championships.

- 10 wins in discus throw (2005, 2006, 2007, 2008, 2009, 2010, 2014, 2015, 2016, 2017)
- 3 win in discus throw (2007, 2014, 2017) at the Italian Winter Throwing Championships

== See also ==
- Italian all-time lists – Discus throw
