= 1997 European Athletics U23 Championships – Men's discus throw =

The men's discus throw event at the 1997 European Athletics U23 Championships was held in Turku, Finland, on 10 and 12 July 1997.

== Medalists ==
Gold	Andrzej Krawczyk; Poland
Silver	Timo Sinervo; Finland
Bronze	Kirill Chuprinin; Ukraine

== Results ==
=== Final ===
12 July

Rank	Name	Nationality	Attempts						Result	Notes
Rank	Name	Nationality	1	2	3	4	5	6	Result	Notes
1st place, gold medalist(s)	Andrzej Krawczyk	Poland	x	57.84	58.10	59.54	x	x	59.54	
2nd place, silver medalist(s)	Timo Sinervo	Finland	55.30	54.52	57.20	x	56.24	x	57.20	
3rd place, bronze medalist(s)	Kirill Chuprinin	Ukraine	54.50	x	56.78	x	54.68	55.46	56.78	
4	Tolga Köseoglu	Germany	54.46	56.72	56.24	x	x	x	56.72	
5	Alexander Forst	Germany	54.96	x	55.80	56.44	54.62	x	56.44	
6	Róbert Fazekas	Hungary	55.60	x	x	53.46	55.06	54.74	55.60	
7	Róland Varga	Hungary	47.06	54.36	54.24	52.60	x	54.68	54.68	
8	Stefanos Konstas	Greece	53.00	x	54.40	52.42	x	53.94	54.40	
9	Linus Bernhult	Sweden	52.80	53.04	53.58				53.58	
10	Mike van der Bilt	Netherlands	46.30	53.02	x				53.02	
11	Valeriy Borisov	Belarus	52.94	x	50.18				52.94	
12	Aleksandr Malasevich	Belarus	52.06	52.08	52.34				52.34	

=== Qualifications ===
10 July
Qualify: first to 12 to the Final

==== Group A ====
Rank	Name	Nationality	Result	Notes
1	Andrzej Krawczyk	Poland	58.10	Q
2	Linus Bernhult	Sweden	54.22	Q
3	Róbert Fazekas	Hungary	54.08	Q
4	Stefanos Konstas	Greece	53.98	Q
5	Valeriy Borisov	Belarus	53.72	Q
6	Alexander Forst	Germany	52.78	Q
7	Ercüment Olgundeniz	Turkey	51.80	
8	Stéphane Nativel	France	51.02	
9	Igor Tuchak	Russia	49.72	

==== Group B ====
Rank	Name	Nationality	Result	Notes
1	Timo Sinervo	Finland	57.08	Q
2	Mike van der Bilt	Netherlands	56.18	Q
3	Kirill Chuprinin	Ukraine	55.56	Q
4	Tolga Köseoglu	Germany	55.20	Q
5	Róland Varga	Hungary	54.76	Q
6	Aleksandr Malasevich	Belarus	53.46	Q
7	Yves Niaré	France	50.34	
	Bjørn Olsson	Norway	NM	

== Participation ==
According to an unofficial count, 17 athletes from 14 countries participated in the event.

- Belarus (2)
- Estonia (0)
- Finland (1)
- France (2)
- Germany (2)
- Greece (1)
- Hungary (2)
- Netherlands (1)
- Norway (1)
- Poland (1)
- Russia (1)
- Sweden (1)
- Turkey (1)
- Ukraine (1)
