= Casey Malone =

American discus thrower

Personal information
- Born: February 6, 1977 (age 49) Wheat Ridge, Colorado, U.S.
- Education: Colorado State University
- Height: 6 ft 9 in (206 cm)
- Weight: 265 lb (120 kg)

Sport
- Country: United States
- Sport: Athletics
- Event: Discus throw

Achievements and titles
- Personal best: 68.49 m (224 ft 8 1/4 in) (2009)
Medal record
Men's athletics
Representing the United States
Olympic Games
NACAC Under-23 Championships in Athletics
Gold medal – first place	2000 NACAC Monterrey, Mexico	Discus throw
IAAF World Junior Championships in Athletics
Gold medal – first place	1996 World Junior Championships in Athletics	Discus throw

Casey Malone (born 6 April 1977 in Wheat Ridge, Colorado) is an American discus thrower. His personal best is 68.49 metres, achieved in June 2009 in Fort Collins, Colorado.

Competing for the Colorado State Rams track and field program, Malone won the 1998 NCAA DI discus title.

== Achievements ==
Year	Competition	Venue	Position	Notes
Representing the United States
1996	World Junior Championships	Sydney, Australia	1st	56.22 m
2000	NACAC U-25 Championships	Monterrey, Mexico	1st	59.19 m
2004	Olympic Games	Athens, Greece	5th	64.33 m
2004	World Athletics Final	Szombathely, Hungary	7th	62.88 m
2008	Olympic Games	Beijing, PR China	19th	61.26 m
