= Zoltán Kővágó =

Hungarian discus thrower

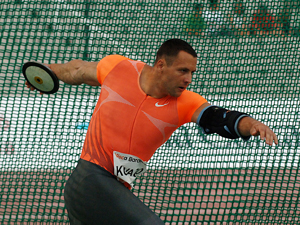

Medal record

Men's athletics

Representing Hungary

Olympic Games
Silver medal – second place	2004 Athens	Discus throw

Zoltán Kővágó (born 10 April 1979 in Szolnok) is a Hungarian discus thrower. At the 2004 Olympic Games he initially won the bronze medal, but was promoted to silver when countryman Róbert Fazekas was disqualified following a doping rule violation.

He himself was serving a competition ban for "evading doping testing". In August 2011 an Austrian doping controller searched for him in his former address. Kővágó already moved from there – he also officially reported his new address earlier – thus according to the controller's own admission he made an appointment with him on the phone and he stated Kővágó had not wanted to meet with him and had refused to give a sample. On the contrary Kővágó could be able to prove with the call registry that in said period the controller did not make any attempt to search for him. The standpoint of the Hungarian Anti-Doping Committee was that the athlete is innocent and the charge does not hold and together with the Hungarian Olympic Committee and the Hungarian Athletics Association they dispensed the athlete after their investigation. The IAAF did not accept this, thus the Hungarian Athletics Association appealed to the CAS (International Sport Court) and fully supported the athlete arguing all the evidence contradicts the controller's word. In the final sentence the former decision of the IAAF was approved and the athlete was banned. The ban lasted from 11 August 2011 to 5 July 2014.

His personal best throw is 69.95 m, achieved in May 2006 in Salon-de-Provence.

== Achievements ==
Year	Competition	Venue	Position	Notes
Representing Hungary
1996	World Junior Championships	Sydney, Australia	4th	53.72 m
1998	World Junior Championships	Annecy, France	1st	59.36 m
1998	European Championships	Budapest, Hungary	22nd	56.89 m
1999	European U23 Championships	Gothenburg, Sweden	6th	58.51 m
2000	Olympic Games	Sydney, Australia	—	NM
2001	European U23 Championships	Amsterdam, Netherlands	1st	63.85 m
2001	World Championships	Edmonton, Canada	20th	58.42 m
2002	European Championships	Munich, Germany	7th	63.63 m
2004	Olympic Games	Athens, Greece	2nd	67.04 m
2004	World Athletics Final	Monte Carlo, Monaco	2nd	64.09 m
2005	World Championships	Helsinki, Finland	10th	62.94 m
2005	World Athletics Final	Monte Carlo, Monaco	3rd	65.65 m
2007	World Championships	Osaka, Japan	9th	63.04 m
2008	Olympic Games	Beijing, PR China	21st	60.79 m
2009	World Championships	Berlin, Germany	6th	65.17 m
2010	European Championships	Barcelona, Spain	20th	59.04 m
2011	World Championships	Daegu, South Korea	15th	62.16 m
2012	European Championships	Helsinki, Finland	DSQ	66.42 m
2014	European Championships	Zürich, Switzerland	14th (q)	61.14 m
2015	World Championships	Beijing, China	18th (h)	61.37 m
2015	Military World Games	Mungyeong, South Korea	1st	66.01 m
2016	European Championships	Amsterdam, Netherlands	6th	64.66 m
2016	Olympic Games	Rio de Janeiro, Brazil	7th	64.50 m
2017	World Championships	London, United Kingdom	22nd (q)	59.46 m
2018	European Championships	Berlin, Germany	20th (q)	59.29 m

== Awards ==
- Masterly youth athlete: 1997
- Cross of Merit of the Republic of Hungary – Golden Cross (2004)
- Hungarian athlete of the Year (1): 2004
