= Jarred Rome =

American discus thrower (1976–2019)

Personal information
- Full name: Jarred Daniel Rome
- Born: December 21, 1976 Seattle, Washington, U.S.
- Died: September 21, 2019 (aged 42) Tulalip, Washington, U.S.
- Height: 6 ft 4 in (193 cm)
- Weight: 315 lb (143 kg)

Sport
- Sport: Track and Field
- Events: Discus Throw, Shot Put
- Club: Nike
- Coached by: Art Venegas and Bud Rasmussen

Achievements and titles
- Personal bests: Discus Throw: 68.76 m (225.6 ft); Shot Put: 20.41 m (67.0 ft)
Medal record
Representing United States
Pan American Games
| Silver medal – second place | 2011 Guadalajara | Discus throw |

Jarred Daniel Rome (December 21, 1976 – September 21, 2019) was an American discus thrower. His personal-best throw was 68.76 meters, achieved on August 7, 2011, in Chula Vista. He was the Throws Coach at Boston University in Boston, Massachusetts. He graduated in 2000 from Boise State University and was inducted into the Boise State Hall of Fame in 2007.

== Achievements ==
Jarred won the 2011 USA Outdoor Track & Field Championships in Eugene, Oregon. This was his 4th consecutive world championship berth. His throw of 63.99m or 209 feet 11 inches gave him his first USA championship win. In college at Boise State University he had both the Indoor and Outdoor Shot Put (I62'6) (O63'11.75) and Outdoor Discus (210'00) school records and was the runner up in the 1997 NCAA Outdoor Championships. He was a six-time All American while attending Boise State.

| Year | Competition | Venue | Position | Event | Notes |
Representing the United States
| 2000 | NACAC U-25 Championships | Monterrey, Mexico | 2nd | Shot put | 19.50 m |
| 2000 | NACAC U-25 Championships | Monterrey, Mexico | 2nd | Discus | 58.08 m |
| 2001 | Universiade | Beijing, China | 8th | Discus | 59.59 m |
| 2004 | Olympic Games | Athens, Greece | 13th | Discus | 61.55 m |
| 2005 | World Championships | Helsinki, Finland | 7th | Discus | 64.22 m |
| 2006 | World Athletics Final | Stuttgart, Germany | 7th | Discus | 67.25 m |
| 2011 | Pan American Games | Guadalajara, Mexico | 2nd | Discus | 61.71 m |

== Personal life ==
Rome was raised in Marysville, Washington, and graduated from Marysville Pilchuck High School in 1995.

On August 5, 2017, he married Boston University Athletic Hall of Fame Field Hockey player (and former US National Team member 2008–2012), Pamela Spuehler. The two met while training in Chula Vista, California, at the Olympic Training Center in 2010.

On September 21, 2019, he was found dead in Marysville after attending an induction ceremony for the Snohomish County Sports Hall of Fame. On November 13, 2019, the Snohomish County Medical Examiners office released the official cause of death. Jarred Rome died as the result of a fentanyl overdose, though it is unknown whether he took the drug deliberately.
