= Roland Varga (discus thrower) =

Hungarian-Croatian discus thrower (born 1977)

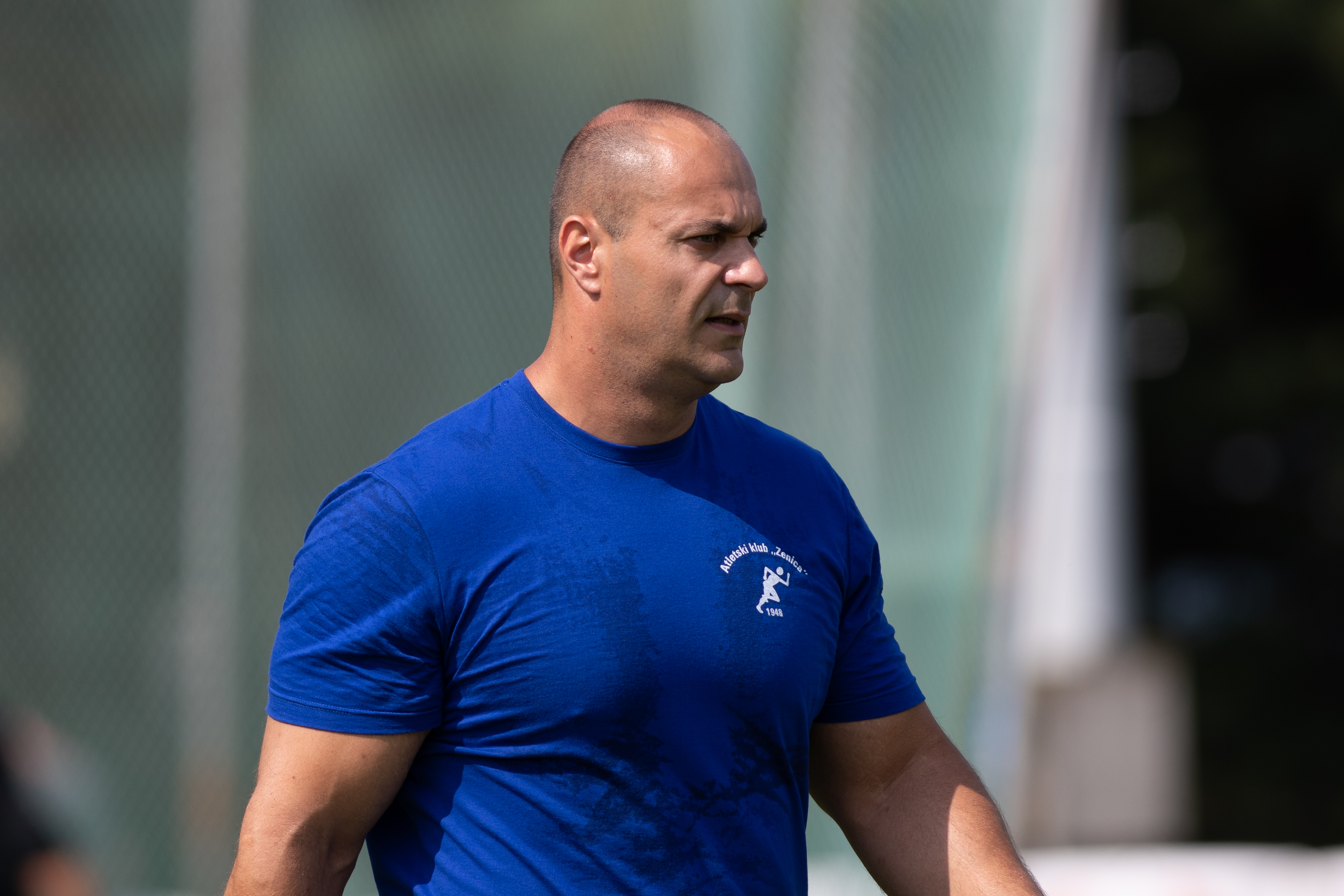
- Roland Varga in 2018

Personal information
- Nationality: Hungarian, Croatian
- Born: 22 October 1977 (age 49) Budapest, Hungary
- Height: 1.96 m (6 ft 5 in)
- Weight: 125 kg (276 lb)

Sport
- Sport: Athletics
- Event: Discus throw

Achievements and titles
- Personal best: 67.38 m (2002)
Medal record
Representing Hungary
World Junior Championships
Silver medal – second place	1996 Sydney	Discus throw
European U23 Championships
Silver medal – second place	1999 Gothenburg	Discus throw
- Updated on 12 August 2012

Roland Varga (born 22 October 1977) is a Hungarian–Croatian discus thrower, Olympic participant.

His personal best throw is 67.38 metres, achieved in June 2002 in Veszprém.

In 2007 Varga was found guilty of boldenone doping. The sample was delivered on 22 July 2006 in an in-competition test in Debrecen. He received an IAAF suspension from September 2006 to September 2008, as well as disqualification of all results accomplished since the day he was tested. The disqualification includes his eleventh place at the 2006 European Championships in August 2006.

Since 2009 Varga competes for Croatia and in 2010 he set a new National Record with 67.20 m.

== Achievements ==
Year	Competition	Venue	Position	Notes
Representing Hungary
1996	World Junior Championships	Sydney, Australia	2nd	55.20 m
1997	European U23 Championships	Turku, Finland	7th	54.68 m
1999	European U23 Championships	Gothenburg, Sweden	2nd	61.99 m
2001	World Championships	Edmonton, Alberta	7th	65.86 m
2001	Summer Universiade	Beijing, PR China	4th	61.88 m
2002	European Championships	Munich, Germany	13th	62.14 m
2003	Summer Universiade	Daegu, South Korea	4th	59.43 m
2005	Summer Universiade	İzmir, Turkey	4th	61.38 m
2006	European Championships	Gothenburg, Sweden	–	DQ

== See also ==
- List of sportspeople sanctioned for doping offences
