= Märt Israel =

Estonian discus thrower

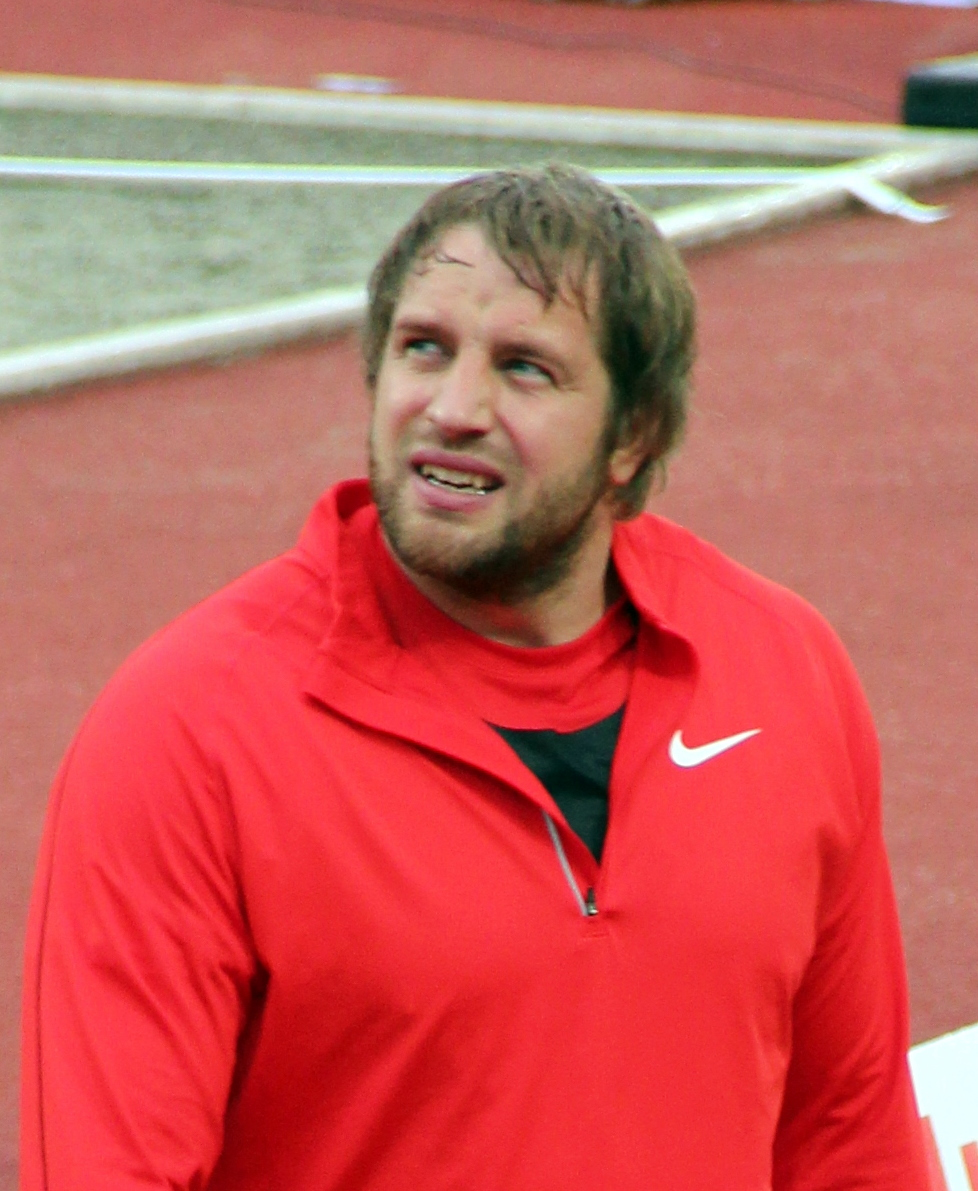
- Israel at the 2011 Bislett Games

Personal information
- Born: September 23, 1983 (age 42) Karksi-Nuia
- Education: Tallinn University of Technology
- Height: 1.90 m (6 ft 3 in)
- Weight: 128 kg (282 lb)

Sport
- Country: Estonia
- Sport: Athletics
- Event: Discus
- Coached by: Vésteinn Hafsteinsson
- Updated on 12 August 2012

Märt Israel (born 23 September 1983 in Karksi-Nuia) is a male discus thrower from Estonia. His personal best is 66.98, achieved in May 2011 in Chula Vista (his previous best was 66.56 metres, achieved in September 2007 in Helsingborg).

== Achievements ==
Year	Competition	Venue	Position	Result
Representing Estonia
2002	World Junior Championships	Kingston, Jamaica	7th	59.43 m
2003	European U23 Championships	Bydgoszcz, Poland	8th	54.86 m
2003	Universiade	Daegu, South Korea	12th	53.57 m
2005	Universiade	İzmir, Turkey	11th	57.63 m
2006	European Championships	Gothenburg, Sweden	14th (q)	59.80 m
2007	Universiade	Bangkok, Thailand	3rd	60.32 m
2008	Olympic Games	Beijing, China	14th (q)	61.98 m
2009	Universiade	Belgrade, Serbia	4th	63.35 m
2010	European Championships	Barcelona, Spain	9th	62.59 m
2011	Universiade	Shenzhen, China	1st	64.07 m
2011	World Championships	Daegu, South Korea	4th	65.20 m
2012	European Championships	Helsinki, Finland	17th (q)	60.59 m
2012	Olympic Games	London, United Kingdom	25th (q)	60.34 m
2014	European Championships	Zürich, Switzerland	–	NM
