= Olgierd Stański =

Polish discus thrower

Personal information
- Nationality: Polish
- Born: 4 April 1973 (age 53) Siedlce, Poland

Sport
- Sport: Athletics
- Event: Discus throw

Olgierd Stański (born 4 April 1973) is a Polish athlete. He competed in the men's discus throw at the 2000 Summer Olympics.
