= Ercüment Olgundeniz =

Turkish discus thrower

Personal information
- Nationality: Turkey
- Born: July 7, 1976 (age 50) İzmir, Turkey
- Height: 198 cm (6 ft 6 in)
- Weight: 146 kg (322 lb)

Sport
- Sport: Discus throw
- Club: Enkaspor
- Coached by: Teodoru Agachi

Achievements and titles
- Personal best: 67.50 m NR (2012)
Medal record
Men's Athletics
Representing Turkey
European Cup Winter Throwing
Silver medal – second place	2012 Bar	Discus Throw
Gold medal – first place	2011 Sofia	Discus Throw
Bronze medal – third place	2007 Yalta	Discus Throw
European Team Championships
Bronze medal – third place	2013 Gateshead	Discus Throw
Mediterranean Games
Silver medal – second place	2013 Mersin	Discus Throw
Silver medal – second place	2009 Pescara	Discus Throw
Bronze medal – third place	2005 Almería	Discus Throw

Ercüment Olgundeniz (born July 7, 1976) is a Turkish track and field athlete competing in the discus and occasionally shot put. The 198 cm (6 ft 6 in) tall athlete at 146 kg (322 lb) is a member of Enkaspor, where he is coached by Teodoru Agachi.

He took part at the 2004 Summer Olympics in Athens, Greece. With his throw of 58.17 m, Olgundeniz ranked 28th and could not qualify for the finals. In 2005, he participated at the Mediterranean Games in Almería, and won the bronze medal with his performance of 59.16 m. He was ranked 44th in the world's best list in 2004 with his personal record of 63.49 metres (Turkish record) set on July 4, 2004, in Istanbul.

In March 2007 in Yalta he improved the record to 64.34 metres. He competed at the 2007 World Championships, but finished last and did not reach the final.

Ercüment Olgundeniz won the silver medal at the 2009 Mediterranean Games held in Pescara, Italy.

On May 27, 2012, he improved his national record from 66.89 m set in 2011 to 67.50 m at the European Champion Clubs Cup held in Vila Real de Santo António, Portugal winning the silver medal.

He qualified for participation in the discus throw event at the 2012 Summer Olympics, but did not reach the final.

At the 2013 Mediterranean Games held in Mersin, Turkey, he became silver medalist in the discus event.

== Achievements ==
Year	Competition	Venue	Position	Event	Notes
Representing Turkey
1996	Turkish Championships	Turkey	1st	Discus throw	57.30 m
1997	Turkish Championships	Turkey	1st	Discus throw	56.98 m
1997	European U23 Championships	Turku, Finland	13th (q)	Discus	51.80 m
1998	Balkan Athletics Championship	Yugoslavia	3rd	Discus throw	
1998	Turkish Championships	Turkey	1st	Discus throw	57.37 m
1998	European Cup C Final		1st	Discus throw	55.36 m
1999	Turkish Championships	Turkey	1st	Shot put	16.81 m
1999	Turkish Championships	Turkey	1st	Discus throw	56.21 m
2000	European Cup C Final	Slovakia	1st	Discus throw	57.23m
2000	Turkish Championships	Turkey	1st	Discus throw	56.21 m
2001	Turkish Championships	Turkey	1st	Discus throw	57.51 m
2001	Balkan Athletics Championships	Greece	2nd	Discus throw	
2001	Cezmi Or Memorial	Turkey	3rd	Discus throw	
2001	Turkish Championships	Turkey	1st	Shot put	17.31 m
2001	Turkish Championships	Turkey	1st	Discus throw	58.47 m
2002	Fajer Athletics Games	Iran	2nd	Discus throw	
2003	European Cup C Final	Istanbul, Turkey	3rd	Discus throw	
2003	Balkan Athletics Championships i	Greece	3rd	Discus throw	
2003	Qualifications for the 2004 Olympics	Turkey	1st	Discus throw	
2004	Turkish Championships	Turkey	1st	Discus throw	61.35 m
2004	European Cup C Final		1st	Discus throw	59.60 m
2004	Balkan Athletics Championship	Istanbul, Turkey	1st	Discus throw	63.49 m NR
2005	European Winter Throwing Cup	Mersin, Turkey	6th	Discus throw	59.21 m
2011	European Winter Throwing Cup	Sofia, Bulgaria	1st	Discus throw	63.31 m
2012	European Winter Throwing Cup	Vila Real de Santo António, Portugal	2nd	Discus throw	67.50 m NR
2013	Mediterranean Games	Mersin, Turkey	2nd	Discus throw	61.46 m
2013	European Team Championships Super League	Gateshead, United Kingdom	3rd	Discus throw	61.32 m
