= Rashid Shafi Al-Dosari =

Qatari discus thrower (born 1981)

Medal record

Men's athletics

Representing Qatar

Asian Games
Silver medal – second place	2006 Doha	Discus throw

Asian Championships
Gold medal – first place	2002 Colombo	Discus throw
Silver medal – second place	2007 Amman	Discus throw

Military World Games
Silver medal – second place	2011 Rio de Janeiro	Discus throw
Bronze medal – third place	2007 Hyderabad	Discus throw

Rashid Shafi Al-Dosari (born 8 May 1981) is a Qatari track and field athlete who competed in the discus throw. He has represented Qatar at the Summer Olympics on two occasions, making his debut in 2000 and reaching the final at the 2008 Summer Olympics. He was also a finalist at the 2007 World Championships in Athletics. In 2003 he was banned from competing for two years due to his refusal to be tested for doping.

Al-Dosari was successful at the continental level, beginning with two Asian Junior titles, a gold medal at the 2002 Asian Athletics Championships and a silver in 2007. In other competitions, he was the bronze medallist at the 2007 Military World Games and won medals at regional competitions including the Pan Arab Games, West Asian Games and Pan Arab Championships. His personal best of 64.43 metres is a former Qatari record.

== Career ==
He started his international career at a young age, winning his first discus title at the age of fifteen at the 1996 Asian Junior Athletics Championships. He won at the Pan Arab Junior Championships two years later and made his global level debut at the 1998 World Junior Championships in Athletics, where he was eighth overall. Al-Dosari was one of the most promising Qatari athletes to emerge at the time, as the small nation was not renowned for producing track and field athletes. He retained his Asian Junior title the following year and also won his first senior titles, with gold medals at the Pan Arab Championships and 1999 Pan Arab Games.

Al-Dosari cleared sixty metres for the first time in Doha in 2000 and later that season he made his Olympic debut in the discus at the age of nineteen, representing Qatar at the 2000 Sydney Olympics. He did not progress past the qualifying stages on that occasion. Still eligible for junior competition, he returned to compete at the 2000 World Junior Championships in Athletics, where he came fifth in the final. He was the discus winner at that year's Gulf Cooperation Council Championships and placed fourth at the 2000 Asian Athletics Championships.

In 2001 he improved his best to 62.77 m and threw in the qualifying rounds at the 2001 World Championships in Athletics. He won his second consecutive gold medal at the Pan Arab Championships in Damascus. He opened 2002 with another win at the GCC Championships, later making progress at the 2002 Asian Athletics Championships where his winning mark of 64.43 m was not only a Qatari national record, but also improved upon Yu Wenge's 11-year-old championships record. He ended the year with a fourth-place finish at the 2002 Asian Games.

He refused to submit to an out-of-competition drugs test by the IAAF in June 2003 and was given a two-year suspension from the sport as a result (from November 2003 to November 2005).

He made his competitive return at the 2005 West Asian Games in December and won the silver medal in the discus behind Iran's Ehsan Haddadi. The next year he had his season's best of 63.49 m in March to win at the Gulf Military Championships and threw the discus 62.11 m at the 2006 Asian Games to finish as runner-up behind Haddadi. In 2007 he came third at the Pan Arab Athletics Championships, but performed well at the 2007 Asian Athletics Championships with a throw of 63.49 m for second place. He had his second throw over 64 metres at the KBC Night of Athletics that year, coming third at the Belgian meeting with 64.20 m. He reached his first global final at the 2007 World Championships in Athletics and finished the competition in eleventh place. His last appearance that season came at the 2007 Military World Games, where he was the bronze medallist in the discus.

Al-Dosari gave the second best performance of his career at the start of 2008, clearing 64.25 m for fourth at the Qatar Athletic Super Grand Prix – a mark which gave him the Olympic standard qualification. At the 2008 Beijing Olympic he was successful in qualifying for the final and his best throw of 62.55 m in the final round brought him tenth place. He did not compete in 2009, but was selected to represent Qatar at the 2010 Asian Games. He came in fifth place, but was overshadowed by his Qatari teammate Ahmed Dheeb who broke Al-Dosari's national record to take the silver medal.

== See also ==
- List of doping cases in athletics
