= Ian Waltz =

American discus thrower

Personal information
- Full name: Ian Scott Waltz
- Born: April 15, 1977 (age 49) Post Falls, Idaho, U.S.
- Height: 6 ft 1 in (185 cm)
- Weight: 269 lb (122 kg)

Sport
- Country: United States
- Sport: Athletics
- Event: Discus throw

Achievements and titles
- Personal best: 68.91 m (2006)
Medal record
IAAF World Cup in Athletics
Bronze medal – third place	2006 Athens	Men's discus throw

Ian Scott Waltz (born April 15, 1977) is an American discus thrower. He is originally from Post Falls, Idaho and attended Washington State University, where he competed for the Washington State Cougars track and field team. Waltz competed at the 2004 Summer Olympics and the 2008 Summer Olympics. His personal best distance is 68.91 metres, achieved in May 2006 in Salinas, California.

He married Olympic Pole Vault Gold Medalist, Stacy Dragila on December 12, 2009. Dragila welcomed daughter Allyx Josephine Waltz on June 21, 2010, in Chula Vista, California.

== Achievements ==
Year	Competition	Venue	Position	Event	Notes
Representing the United States
1996	World Junior Championships	Sydney, Australia	6th	Shot put	17.31 m
1996	World Junior Championships	Sydney, Australia	5th	Discus	53.16 m
2004	Olympic Games	Athens, Greece	21st	Discus	58.97 m
2005	World Championships	Helsinki, Finland	5th	Discus	64.27 m
2006	World Athletics Final	Stuttgart, Germany	4th	Discus	62.94 m
2006	World Cup	Athens, Greece	3rd	Discus	62.12 m
2008	Olympic Games	Beijing, PR China	25th	Discus	60.02 m
