= Bogdan Pishchalnikov =

Russian discus thrower

Personal information
- Born: August 26, 1982 (age 43)
- Height: 1.96 m (6 ft 5 in)
- Weight: 120 kg (265 lb)

Sport
- Country: Russia
- Sport: Athletics
- Event: Discus
- Updated on 12 August 2012

Bogdan Vitalyevich Pishchalnikov (Russian: Богдан Витальевич Пищальников; (born 26 August 1982) is a Russian discus thrower. He is the brother of Darya Pishchalnikova and Kirill Pishchalnikov.

He finished eleventh at the 2003 Universiade and seventh at the 2006 IAAF World Cup. He also competed at the 2005 World Championships and the 2006 European Athletics Championships without qualifying for the final round.

His personal best throw is 67.23 metres, achieved in May 2010 in Sochi.
