= Andrzej Krawczyk =

Polish discus thrower (born 1976)

Personal information
- Born: April 11, 1976 (age 50) Płońsk, Poland
- Occupation: Physiotherapist
- Years active: 1993–2008

Sport
- Sport: Track and field
- Event: Discus throw
Medal record
Representing Poland
Summer Universiade
Silver medal – second place	2003 Daegu	Discus throw

Andrzej Krawczyk (born 11 April 1976) is a retired Polish discus thrower. His personal best throw is 65.56 metres, achieved in July 2005 in Norrtälje.

== Career ==
He started out in the shot put and was the bronze medallist at the European Youth Olympic Festival in 1993. He just missed out on a discus medal at the 1994 World Junior Championships in Athletics, placing fourth, but he topped the podium at the 1995 European Athletics Junior Championships the following year. He followed this up with a gold medal at the 1997 European Athletics U23 Championships.

He cleared sixty metres for the first time in 1998, setting a season's best mark of 61.96 m in Sopot, but did not manage the feat at the 1998 European Athletics Championships, where he was eliminated in the qualifying round. He made his first senior appearance at world level at the 1999 World Championships in Athletics, but was also knocked out in the first round.

His next major performance after this came at the 2001 European Cup Winter Throwing event where he claimed the discus silver medal. His 2003 season brought further honours in the form of a silver at the Summer Universiade and also a bronze at that year's European Cup. In 2005 he came sixth in the 2005 European Cup, but threw his career best of 65.56 m the next month in Norrtälje. He gained entry into the 2005 World Championships in Athletics and reached the final round, ending the competition in twelfth with a best throw of 62.71 m. The final major tournament of his career was the 2006 European Athletics Championships, at which he was tenth in the final. He stopped competing professionally in 2008. He became a six-time national champion in the discus event.

Following his retirement, he became a physiotherapist for fellow Polish thrower Piotr Małachowski.
