= List of discus throw national champions (men) =

Below a list of all national champions in the Men's Discus Throw event in track and field from several countries since 1980.

== Australia ==
- 1980: Phil Nettle
- 1981: Phil Nettle
- 1982: Vlad Slavnic
- 1983: Paul Nandapi
- 1984: Paul Nandapi
- 1985: Paul Nandapi
- 1986: Paul Nandapi
- 1987: Paul Nandapi
- 1988: Werner Reiterer
- 1989: Werner Reiterer
- 1990: Werner Reiterer
- 1991: Werner Reiterer
- 1992: Werner Reiterer
- 1993: Werner Reiterer
- 1994: Werner Reiterer
- 1995: Werner Reiterer
- 1996: Justin Anlezark
- 1997: Gerard Duffy
- 1998: Ian Winchester (NZL)
- 1999: Gerard Duffy
- 2000: Ian Winchester (NZL)
- 2001: Aaron Neighbour
- 2002: Peter Elvy
- 2003: Peter Elvy
- 2004: Scott Martin
- 2005: Scott Martin
- 2006: Scott Martin
- 2007: Benn Harradine
- 2008: Benn Harradine
- 2009: Bertrand Vili (FRA)

== Belgium ==
- 1970: Jos Schroeder
- 1971: Jos Schroeder
- 1972: Jos Schroeder
- 1973: Jos Schroeder
- 1974: Jos Schroeder
- 1975: Robert Van Schoor
- 1976: Jos Schroeder
- 1977: Jos Schroeder
- 1978: Jos Schroeder
- 1979: Jos Schroeder
- 1980: Jos Schroeder
- 1981: Jos Schroeder
- 1982: Robert Van Schoor
- 1983: Jos Schroeder
- 1984: Robert Van Schoor
- 1985: Jos Schroeder
- 1986: Robert Van Schoor
- 1987: Jos Schroeder
- 1988: Jordy Beernaert
- 1989: Jordy Beernaert
- 1990: Jo Van Daele
- 1991: Herman Van Uytven
- 1992: Jordy Beernaert
- 1993: Jo Van Daele
- 1994: Jo Van Daele
- 1995: Jo Van Daele
- 1996: Jo Van Daele
- 1997: Jo Van Daele
- 1998: Jo Van Daele
- 1999: Jo Van Daele
- 2000: Jo Van Daele
- 2001: Kris Coene
- 2002: Jo Van Daele
- 2003: Jo Van Daele
- 2004: Jo Van Daele
- 2005: Jo Van Daele
- 2006: Milosz Tomarek
- 2007: Wim Blondeel
- 2008: Kris Coene
- 2009: Wim Blondeel
- 2010: Wim Blondeel
- 2011: Philip Milanov
- 2012: Philip Milanov
- 2013: Philip Milanov
- 2014: Philip Milanov

== Bulgaria ==
- 1980: Emil Vladimirov
- 1981: Emil Vladimirov
- 1982: Velislav Prokhaska
- 1983: Velko Velev
- 1984: Velko Velev
- 1985: Georgi Georgiev
- 1986: Kamen Dimitrov
- 1987: Kamen Dimitrov
- 1988: Georgi Georgiev
- 1989: Georgi Georgiev
- 1990: Nikolai Kolev
- 1991: Georgi Georgiev
- 1992: Nikolai Kolev
- 1993: Kamen Dimitrov
- 1994: Ilian Iliev
- 1995: Ilian Iliev
- 1996: Ilian Iliev
- 1997: Kiril Angelov
- 1998: Ilian Manolov
- 1999: Miroslav Kostov
- 2000: Encho Shterev
- 2001: Ivan Stanev
- 2002: Encho Shterev
- 2003: Encho Shterev
- 2004: Encho Shterev
- 2005: Encho Shterev
- 2006: Encho Shterev

== Canada ==
- 1980: Borys Chambul
- 1981: Jack Harkness
- 1982: Borys Chambul
- 1983: Rob Gray
- 1984: Rob Gray
- 1985: Rob Gray
- 1986: Rob Gray
- 1987: Ray Lazdins
- 1988: Ray Lazdins
- 1989: Ray Lazdins
- 1990: Ray Lazdins
- 1991: Ray Lazdins
- 1992: Ray Lazdins
- 1993: Ray Lazdins
- 1994: Ray Lazdins
- 1995: Jason Tunks
- 1996: Jason Tunks
- 1997: Jason Tunks
- 1998: Jason Tunks
- 1999: Jason Tunks
- 2000: Jason Tunks
- 2001: Jason Tunks
- 2002: Jason Tunks
- 2003: Jason Tunks
- 2004: Jason Tunks
- 2005: Jason Tunks
- 2006: Dariusz Slownik
- 2007: Jason Tunks
- 2008: Jason Tunks
- 2009: Jason Tunks
- 2010: Mike Ransky
- 2011: Brent Roubos
- 2012: Timothy Nedow

== Denmark ==
- 1980: Kjeld Andresen
- 1981: Kjeld Andresen
- 1982: Kjeld Andresen
- 1983: Claus Bahrt
- 1984: Peder Jarl Hansen
- 1985: Peder Jarl Hansen
- 1986: Kjeld Andresen
- 1987: Allan Laursen
- 1988: Allan Laursen
- 1989: Claus Lynggård
- 1990: Claus Lynggård
- 1991: Jan Cordius
- 1992: Jan Cordius
- 1993: Allan Laursen
- 1994: Brian Møller
- 1995: Jan Cordius
- 1996: Brian Møller
- 1997: Jan Cordius
- 1998: Dariusz Slowik
- 1999: Joachim Olsen
- 2000: Joachim Olsen
- 2001: Joachim Olsen
- 2002: Joachim Olsen
- 2003: Joachim Olsen
- 2004: Martin Roald
- 2005: Michael Johansen
- 2006: Peter Berling
- 2007: Joachim Olsen

== Estonia ==
- 1917*: Aleksander Klumberg
- 1918*: Aleksander Klumberg
- 1919*: Harald Tammer
- 1920: Harald Tammer
- 1921: Harald Tammer
- 1922: Aleksander Klumberg
- 1923: Aleksander Klumberg
- 1924: Gustav Kalkun
- 1925: Gustav Kalkun
- 1926: Aleksander Klumberg
- 1927: Mihkal Liinat
- 1928: Gustav Kalkun
- 1929: Nikolai Feldmann
- 1930: Nikolai Feldmann
- 1931: Nikolai Feldmann
- 1932: Nikolai Feldmann
- 1933: Arnold Viiding
- 1934: Arnold Viiding
- 1935: Arnold Viiding
- 1936: Oskar Erikson
- 1937: Oskar Erikson
- 1938: Oskar Erikson
- 1939: Paul Määrits
- 1940: Oskar Linnaste
- 1941: -
- 1942: Oskar Linnaste
- 1943: Aleksander Kreek
- 1944: Elmar Lilienthal
- 1945: Aadu Tarmak
- 1946: Aadu Tarmak
- 1947: Arvo Putmaker
- 1948: Heino Lipp
- 1949: Heino Lipp
- 1950: Dimitri Prants
- 1951: Heino Lipp
- 1952: Heino Lipp
- 1953: Heino Lipp
- 1954: Heino Lipp
- 1955: Heino Apart
- 1956: Heino Heinaste
- 1957: Heino Apart
- 1958: Kaupo Metsur
- 1959: Kaupo Metsur
- 1960: Kaupo Metsur
- 1961: Enn Erikson
- 1962: Kaupo Metsur
- 1963: Kaupo Metsur
- 1964: Kaupo Metsur
- 1965: Kaupo Metsur
- 1966: Kaupo Metsur
- 1967: Kaupo Metsur
- 1968: Kaupo Metsur
- 1969: Enn Erikson
- 1970: Veljo Kuusemäe
- 1971: Enn Erikson
- 1972: Enn Erikson
- 1973: Enn Erikson
- 1974: Veljo Kuusemäe
- 1975: Enn Erikson
- 1976: Veljo Kuusemäe
- 1977: Veljo Kuusemäe
- 1978: Veljo Kuusemäe
- 1979: Kalev Külv
- 1980: Kalev Külv
- 1981: Kalev Külv
- 1982: Kalev Külv
- 1983: Kalev Külv
- 1984: Kalev Külv
- 1985: Kalev Külv
- 1986: Kalev Külv
- 1987: Kalev Külv
- 1988: Kalev Külv
- 1989: Kalev Külv
- 1990: Ants Kiisa
- 1991: Valter Külvet
- 1992: Ants Kiisa
- 1993: Aleksander Tammert
- 1994: Aleksander Tammert
- 1995: Aleksander Tammert
- 1996: Ants Kiisa
- 1997: Aleksander Tammert
- 1998: Aleksander Tammert
- 1999: Aleksander Tammert
- 2000: Aleksander Tammert
- 2001: Aleksander Tammert
- 2002: Aleksander Tammert
- 2003: Aleksander Tammert
- 2004: Gerd Kanter
- 2005: Gerd Kanter
- 2006: Gerd Kanter
- 2007: Gerd Kanter
- 2008: Gerd Kanter
- 2009: Gerd Kanter
- 2010: Aleksander Tammert
- 2011: Gerd Kanter
- 2012: Gerd Kanter
- 2013: Gerd Kanter
- 2014: Gerd Kanter
- 2015: Gerd Kanter
- 2016: Martin Kupper
- 2017: Martin Kupper
- 2018: Gerd Kanter
- 2019: Gerd Kanter
- 2020: Martin Kupper
- 2021: Martin Kupper
- 2022: Kevin Sakson

* unofficial championships

== Finland ==
- 1980: Markku Tuokko
- 1981: Markku Tuokko
- 1982: Markku Tuokko
- 1983: Ari Huumonen
- 1984: Juhani Tuomola
- 1985: Ari Huumonen
- 1986: Raimo Vento
- 1987: Ari Huumonen
- 1988: Mika Muukka
- 1989: Raimo Vento
- 1990: Mika Muukka
- 1991: Heikki Hollmén
- 1992: Heikki Hollmén
- 1993: Martti Halmesmäki
- 1994: Harri Uurainen
- 1995: Harri Uurainen
- 1996: Timo Sinervo
- 1997: Harri Uurainen
- 1998: Timo Tompuri
- 1999: Pertti Hynni
- 2000: Timo Tompuri
- 2001: Timo Tompuri
- 2002: Mika Loikkanen
- 2003: Timo Tompuri
- 2004: Pertti Hynni
- 2005: Timo Tompuri
- 2006: Mikko Kyyrö
- 2007: Frantz Kruger
- 2008: Frantz Kruger
- 2009: Mikko Kyyrö
- 2010: Frantz Kruger
- 2011: Mikko Kyyrö

== Germany ==
=== East Germany ===
- 1980: Wolfgang Schmidt
- 1981: Armin Lemme
- 1982: Armin Lemme
- 1983: Jürgen Schult
- 1984: Jürgen Schult
- 1985: Jürgen Schult
- 1986: Jürgen Schult
- 1987: Jürgen Schult
- 1988: Jürgen Schult
- 1989: Jürgen Schult
- 1990: Jürgen Schult

=== West Germany ===
- 1980: Rolf Danneberg
- 1981: Alwin Wagner
- 1982: Alwin Wagner
- 1983: Alwin Wagner
- 1984: Alwin Wagner
- 1985: Alwin Wagner
- 1986: Alois Hannecker
- 1987: Alois Hannecker
- 1988: Rolf Danneberg
- 1989: Rolf Danneberg
- 1990: Wolfgang Schmidt

=== Unified Germany ===
- 1991: Wolfgang Schmidt
- 1992: Lars Riedel
- 1993: Lars Riedel
- 1994: Lars Riedel
- 1995: Lars Riedel
- 1996: Lars Riedel
- 1997: Lars Riedel
- 1998: Lars Riedel
- 1999: Jürgen Schult
- 2000: Lars Riedel
- 2001: Lars Riedel
- 2002: Michael Möllenbeck
- 2003: Lars Riedel
- 2004: Michael Möllenbeck
- 2005: Michael Möllenbeck
- 2006: Lars Riedel
- 2007: Robert Harting
- 2008: Robert Harting
- 2009: Robert Harting
- 2010: Robert Harting
- 2011: Robert Harting
- 2012: Robert Harting
- 2013: Robert Harting
- 2014: Robert Harting
- 2015: Christoph Harting

== Great Britain ==
- 1980: Brian Oldfield (USA)
- 1981: John Powell (USA)
- 1982: Brad Cooper (BAH)
- 1983: Robert Weir
- 1984: Robert Weir
- 1985: Juan Martínez (CUB)
- 1986: Richard Slaney
- 1987: Paul Mardle
- 1988: Paul Mardle
- 1989: Paul Mardle
- 1990: Abi Ekoku
- 1991: Werner Reiterer (AUS)
- 1992: Werner Reiterer (AUS)
- 1993: Robert Weir
- 1994: Kevin Brown
- 1995: Nick Sweeney (IRL)
- 1996: Robert Weir
- 1997: Robert Weir
- 1998: Robert Weir
- 1999: Robert Weir
- 2000: Robert Weir
- 2001: Glen Smith
- 2002: Robert Weir
- 2003: Emeka Udechuku
- 2004: Emeka Udechuku
- 2005: Carl Myerscough
- 2006: Carl Myerscough
- 2007: Emeka Udechuku
- 2011: Lawrence Okoye

== Hungary ==
- 1980: Ferenc Szegletes
- 1981: Ferenc Szegletes
- 1982: Ferenc Csiszár
- 1983: Ferenc Csiszár
- 1984: Ferenc Tégla
- 1985: Csaba Holló
- 1986: Csaba Holló
- 1987: Attila Horváth
- 1988: József Ficsor
- 1989: József Ficsor
- 1990: Attila Horváth
- 1991: Attila Horváth
- 1992: Attila Horváth
- 1993: Attila Horváth
- 1994: Attila Horváth
- 1995: Attila Horváth
- 1996: Attila Horváth
- 1997: Attila Horváth
- 1998: Róbert Fazekas
- 1999: Roland Varga
- 2000: Róbert Fazekas
- 2001: Zoltán Kővágó
- 2002: Róbert Fazekas
- 2003: Róbert Fazekas
- 2004: Zoltán Kővágó
- 2005: Zoltán Kővágó
- 2006: Roland Varga

== Italy ==
- 1980: Armando De Vincentis
- 1981: Armando De Vincentis
- 1982: Marco Bucci
- 1983: Marco Martino
- 1984: Marco Bucci
- 1985: Domenico Polato
- 1986: Marco Martino
- 1987: Marco Martino
- 1988: Marco Martino
- 1989: Luciano Zerbini
- 1990: Marco Martino
- 1991: Marco Martino
- 1992: Luciano Zerbini
- 1993: Luciano Zerbini
- 1994: Diego Fortuna
- 1995: Diego Fortuna
- 1996: Alessandro Urlando
- 1997: Diego Fortuna
- 1998: Diego Fortuna
- 1999: Diego Fortuna
- 2000: Diego Fortuna
- 2001: Diego Fortuna
- 2002: Cristiano Andrei
- 2003: Cristiano Andrei
- 2004: Diego Fortuna
- 2005: Hannes Kirchler
- 2006: Hannes Kirchler
- 2007: Hannes Kirchler
- 2008: Hannes Kirchler
- 2009: Hannes Kirchler
- 2010: Hannes Kirchler

== Latvia ==
- 2008: Oskars Siļčenoks
- 2009: Oskars Vaisjūns
- 2010: Oskars Vaisjūns

== Netherlands ==
- 1980: Jan Diender
- 1981: Erik de Bruin
- 1982: Erik de Bruin
- 1983: Erik de Bruin
- 1984: Erik de Bruin
- 1985: Erik de Bruin
- 1986: Erik de Bruin
- 1987: Erik de Bruin
- 1988: Erik de Bruin
- 1989: Erik de Bruin
- 1990: Erik de Bruin
- 1991: Erik de Bruin
- 1992: Erik de Bruin
- 1993: Erik de Bruin
- 1994: Ben Vet
- 1995: Ben Vet
- 1996: Ben Vet
- 1997: Pieter van der Kruk Jr.
- 1998: Mike van der Bilt
- 1999: Mike van der Bilt
- 2000: Pieter van der Kruk Jr.
- 2001: Pieter van der Kruk Jr.
- 2002: Rutger Smith
- 2003: Rutger Smith
- 2004: Rutger Smith
- 2005: Rutger Smith
- 2006: Rutger Smith
- 2007: Rutger Smith
- 2008: Rutger Smith
- 2009: Boudewijn Luijten
- 2010: Erik Cadée
- 2011: Rutger Smith
- 2012: Erik Cadée
- 2013: Erik Cadée
- 2014: Erik Cadée
- 2015: Rutger Smith

== Poland ==
- 1980: Stanisław Wołodko
- 1981: Stanisław Wołodko
- 1982: Dariusz Juzyszyn
- 1983: Dariusz Juzyszyn
- 1984: Stanisław Grabowski
- 1985: Dariusz Juzyszyn
- 1986: Dariusz Juzyszyn
- 1987: Dariusz Juzyszyn
- 1988: Dariusz Juzyszyn
- 1989: Dariusz Juzyszyn
- 1990: Jacek Strychalski
- 1991: Jacek Strychalski
- 1992: Marek Majkrzak
- 1993: Marek Stolarczyk
- 1994: Marek Majkrzak
- 1995: Dariusz Juzyszyn
- 1996: Andrzej Krawczyk
- 1997: Andrzej Krawczyk
- 1998: Andrzej Krawczyk
- 1999: Olgierd Stański
- 2000: Olgierd Stański
- 2001: Olgierd Stański
- 2002: Andrzej Krawczyk
- 2003: Andrzej Krawczyk
- 2004: Andrzej Krawczyk
- 2005: Piotr Małachowski
- 2006: Piotr Małachowski
- 2007: Piotr Małachowski
- 2008: Piotr Małachowski
- 2009: Piotr Małachowski
- 2010: Piotr Małachowski
- 2011: Przemysław Czajkowski
- 2012: Piotr Małachowski
- 2013: Piotr Małachowski
- 2014: Piotr Małachowski
- 2015: Piotr Małachowski
- 2016: Piotr Małachowski
- 2017: Robert Urbanek
- 2018: Piotr Małachowski
- 2019: Bartłomiej Stój

== Portugal ==
- 1980: Carlos Sustelo
- 1981: Carlos Sustelo
- 1982: Manuel Pinto
- 1983: Jorge Grave
- 1984: Paulo Santos
- 1985: Paulo Santos
- 1986: Paulo Santos
- 1987: Paulo Santos
- 1988: Paulo Santos
- 1989: Fernando Alves
- 1990: Paulo Santos
- 1991: Fernando Alves
- 1992: Fernando Alves
- 1993: Fernando Alves
- 1994: Paulo Santos
- 1995: Paulo Bernardo
- 1996: Fernando Alves
- 1997: Paulo Bernardo
- 1998: Paulo Bernardo
- 1999: Fernando Alves
- 2000: Paulo Bernardo
- 2001: Paulo Bernardo
- 2002: Paulo Bernardo
- 2003: Paulo Bernardo
- 2004: Paulo Bernardo
- 2005: Paulo Bernardo
- 2006: Jorge Grave
- 2007: Jorge Grave
- 2008: Jorge Grave
- 2009: Marco Fortes
- 2010: Jorge Grave
- 2011: Marco Fortes
- 2012: Jorge Grave

== Russia ==
- 1992: Dmitriy Shevchenko
- 1993: Dmitriy Shevchenko
- 1994: Sergey Lyakhov
- 1995: Sergey Lyakhov
- 1996: Yuriy Seskin
- 1997: Aleksandr Borichevskiy
- 1998: Aleksandr Borichevskiy
- 1999: Dmitriy Shevchenko
- 2000: Dmitriy Shevchenko
- 2001: Dmitriy Shevchenko
- 2002: Ilya Kostin
- 2003: Dmitriy Shevchenko
- 2004: Aleksandr Borichevskiy
- 2005: Bogdan Pishchalnikov
- 2006: Stanislav Alekseyev

== South Africa ==
- 1980: Izak Kotze
- 1981: Piet Goosen
- 1982: Piet Goosen
- 1983: Izak Kotze
- 1984: Izak Kotze
- 1985: John van Reenen
- 1986: John van Reenen
- 1987: John van Reenen
- 1988: George Tossel
- 1989: George Tossel
- 1990: Dawie Kok
- 1991: Dawie Kok
- 1992: Dawie Kok
- 1993: Christo Kruger
- 1994: Frits Potgieter
- 1995: Frits Potgieter
- 1996: Frantz Kruger
- 1997: Frits Potgieter
- 1998: Frits Potgieter
- 1999: Frantz Kruger
- 2000: Frantz Kruger
- 2001: Frantz Kruger
- 2002: Frantz Kruger
- 2003: Frantz Kruger
- 2004: Frantz Kruger
- 2005: Frantz Kruger
- 2006: Hannes Hopley

== Spain ==
- 1980: Sinesio Garrachón
- 1981: Sinesio Garrachón
- 1982: Sinesio Garrachón
- 1983: Sinesio Garrachón
- 1984: Sinesio Garrachón
- 1985: Sinesio Garrachón
- 1986: Sinesio Garrachón
- 1987: David Martínez
- 1988: David Martínez
- 1989: David Martínez
- 1990: David Martínez
- 1991: David Martínez
- 1992: David Martínez
- 1993: José Luis Valencia
- 1994: David Martínez
- 1995: David Martínez
- 1996: David Martínez
- 1997: José Luis Valencia
- 1998: José Luis Valencia
- 1999: José Luis Valencia
- 2000: David Martínez
- 2001: Mario Pestano
- 2002: Mario Pestano
- 2003: Mario Pestano
- 2004: Mario Pestano
- 2005: Mario Pestano
- 2006: Mario Pestano
- 2007: Mario Pestano
- 2008: Mario Pestano
- 2009: Mario Pestano
- 2010: Mario Pestano
- 2011: Mario Pestano
- 2012: Mario Pestano

== Sweden ==
- 1980: Kenth Gardenkrans
- 1981: Kenth Gardenkrans
- 1982: Göran Svensson
- 1983: Ricky Bruch
- 1984: Stefan Fernholm
- 1985: Lars Sundin
- 1986: Göran Bergqvist
- 1987: Lars Sundin
- 1988: Lars Sundin
- 1989: Stefan Fernholm
- 1990: Stefan Fernholm
- 1991: Stefan Fernholm
- 1992: Lars Sundin
- 1993: Dag Solhaug
- 1994: Kristian Pettersson
- 1995: Kristian Pettersson
- 1996: Kristian Pettersson
- 1997: Mattias Borrman
- 1998: Kristian Pettersson
- 1999: Mattias Borrman
- 2000: Mattias Borrman
- 2001: Kristian Pettersson
- 2002: Kristian Pettersson
- 2003: Mattias Borrman
- 2004: Niklas Arrhenius
- 2005: Staffan Jönsson
- 2006: Niklas Arrhenius
- 2007: Niklas Arrhenius
- 2008: Leif Arrhenius
- 2009: Per Rosell

== Ukraine ==
- 1992: Volodymyr Zinchenko
- 1993: Volodymyr Zinchenko
- 1994: Volodymyr Zinchenko
- 1995: Vitaliy Sidorov
- 1996: Vitaliy Sidorov
- 1997: Vitaliy Sidorov
- 1998: Vitaliy Sidorov
- 1999: Yuriy Bilonoh
- 2000: Kyrylo Chuprynin
- 2001: Yuriy Bilonoh
- 2002: Abbas Samimi (IRI)
- 2003: Yuriy Bilonog
- 2004: Kyrylo Chuprynin
- 2005: Kyrylo Chuprynin
- 2006: Serhiy Prughlo
- 2007: Stanislav Nesterovskyi
- 2008: Mykyta Nesterenko
- 2009: Oleksiy Semenov
- 2010: Ivan Hryshyn
- 2011: Ivan Hryshyn
- 2012: Mykyta Nesterenko
- 2013: Mykyta Nesterenko
- 2014: Oleksiy Semenov
- 2015: Mykyta Nesterenko
- 2016: Mykyta Nesterenko
- 2017: Ivan Panasyuk
- 2018: Mykyta Nesterenko
- 2019: Mykyta Nesterenko
- 2020: Mykyta Nesterenko

== United States ==
- 1980: Mac Wilkins
- 1981: Ben Plucknett
- 1982: Luis Delís (CUB)
- 1983: John Powell
- 1984: John Powell
- 1985: John Powell
- 1986: John Powell
- 1987: John Powell
- 1988: Mac Wilkins
- 1989: Kamy Keshmiri
- 1990: Kamy Keshmiri
- 1991: Anthony Washington
- 1992: Kamy Keshmiri
- 1993: Anthony Washington
- 1994: Mike Gravelle
- 1995: Mike Buncic
- 1996: Anthony Washington
- 1997: John Godina
- 1998: John Godina
- 1999: Anthony Washington
- 2000: Adam Setliff
- 2001: Adam Setliff
- 2002: Adam Setliff
- 2003: Carl Brown
- 2004: Jarred Rome
- 2005: Ian Waltz
- 2006: Ian Waltz
- 2007: Michael Robertson
- 2008: Ian Waltz
- 2009: Casey Malone
- 2010: Casey Malone
