= 1982 European Athletics Championships – Men's discus throw =

1982 athletic event

Men's discus throw at the European Athletics Championships

These are the official results of the Men's Discus Throw event at the 1982 European Championships in Athens, Greece, held at the Olympic Stadium "Spiros Louis" on 10 and 11 September 1982.

== Medalists ==
Gold	Imrich Bugár; Czechoslovakia
Silver	Ihor Duhinets; Soviet Union
Bronze	Wolfgang Warnemünde; East Germany

== Results ==
=== Final ===
11 September

Rank	Name	Nationality	Result	Notes
1st place, gold medalist(s)	Imrich Bugár	Czechoslovakia	66.64	
2nd place, silver medalist(s)	Ihor Duhinets	Soviet Union	65.60	
3rd place, bronze medalist(s)	Wolfgang Warnemünde	East Germany	64.20	
4	Armin Lemme	East Germany	63.94	
5	Georgiy Kolnootchenko	Soviet Union	62.82	
6	Géjza Valent	Czechoslovakia	61.98	
7	Ion Zamfirache	Romania	61.66	
8	Iosif Nagy	Romania	60.56	
9	Dmitriy Kovtsun	Soviet Union	58.44	
10	Alwin Wagner	West Germany	58.10	
11	Werner Hartmann	West Germany	57.68	
12	Knut Hjeltnes	Norway	56.02	

=== Qualification ===
10 September

Rank	Name	Nationality	Result	Notes
1	Wolfgang Warnemünde	East Germany	63.74	Q
2	Imrich Bugár	Czechoslovakia	63.52	Q
3	Dmitriy Kovtsun	Soviet Union	62.66	Q
4	Ihor Duhinets	Soviet Union	62.54	Q
5	Géjza Valent	Czechoslovakia	62.52	Q
6	Armin Lemme	East Germany	61.94	Q
7	Alwin Wagner	West Germany	61.26	Q
8	Georgiy Kolnootchenko	Soviet Union	61.20	Q
9	Werner Hartmann	West Germany	61.10	Q
10	Ion Zamfirache	Romania	60.70	q
11	Knut Hjeltnes	Norway	60.58	q
12	Iosif Nagy	Romania	60.46	q
13	Borislav Tashev	Bulgaria	59.80	
14	Marco Martino	Italy	59.48	
15	Rolf Danneberg	West Germany	59.44	
16	Marco Bucci	Italy	59.08	
17	Ari Huumonen	Finland	58.98	
18	Kenth Gardenkrans	Sweden	57.90	
19	Konstantinos Georgakopoulos	Greece	57.62	
20	Göran Svensson	Sweden	56.40	
21	Richard Slaney	United Kingdom	55.98	
22	Roger Axelsson	Sweden	52.24	
	Markku Tuokko	Finland	NM	
	Georg Frank	Austria	NM	

== Participation ==
According to an unofficial count, 24 athletes from 13 countries participated in the event.

- Austria (1)
- Bulgaria (1)
- Czechoslovakia (2)
- East Germany (2)
- Finland (2)
- Greece (1)
- Italy (2)
- Norway (1)
- Romania (2)
- Soviet Union (3)
- Sweden (3)
- United Kingdom (1)
- West Germany (3)

== See also ==
- 1978 Men's European Championships Discus Throw (Prague)
- 1980 Men's Olympic Discus Throw (Moscow)
- 1983 Men's World Championships Discus Throw (Helsinki)
- 1984 Men's Olympic Discus Throw (Los Angeles)
- 1986 Men's European Championships Discus Throw (Stuttgart)
- 1987 Men's World Championships Discus Throw (Rome)
- 1988 Men's Olympic Discus Throw (Seoul)
