= Athletics at the 1980 Summer Olympics – Men's discus throw =

Men's discus throw at the Games of the XXII Olympiad
- Venue: Lenin Stadium
- Dates: 27 July 1980 (qualifying); 28 July 1980 (final)
- Competitors: 18 from 12 nations
- Winning distance: 66.64

Medalists
1st place, gold medalist(s)		Viktor Rashchupkin; Soviet Union
2nd place, silver medalist(s)		Imrich Bugár; Czechoslovakia
3rd place, bronze medalist(s)		Luis Delís; Cuba

The men's discus throw event at the 1980 Summer Olympics in Moscow, Soviet Union had an entry list of 18 competitors from 12 nations, with one qualifying group and the final (12) held on Monday July 28, 1980. The maximum number of athletes per nation had been set at 3 since the 1930 Olympic Congress. The event was won by Viktor Rashchupkin of the Soviet Union, the nation's first medal and first victory in the men's discus throw. Imrich Bugár put Czechoslovakia back on the podium in the event after a one-Games absence, taking silver. Luis Delís earned Cuba's first men's discus throw medal with his bronze. The United States, which had earned at least one medal in every appearance of the event prior to 1980, missed the podium due to the boycott.

== Background ==
This was the 19th appearance of the event, which is one of 12 athletics events to have been held at every Summer Olympics. Returning finalists from the 1976 Games were silver medalist Wolfgang Schmidt of East Germany and tenth-place finisher Velko Velev of Bulgaria. Schmidt was the 1978 European champion and world record holder as well, but was bothered by an ankle injury. That injury, along with the absence of the American team due to boycott (1976 Olympic champion Mac Wilkins was still a top thrower, and four-time gold medalist Al Oerter had come out of retirement) left the competition open.

Kuwait and Syria each made their debut in the men's discus throw. Sweden made its 15th appearance, most of any nation competing, though tied with Hungary for second behind the United States's 18 appearances.

== Competition format ==
The competition used the two-round format introduced in 1936, with the qualifying round completely separate from the divided final. In qualifying, each athlete received three attempts; those recording a mark of at least 62.00 metres advanced to the final. If fewer than 12 athletes achieved that distance, the top 12 would advance. The results of the qualifying round were then ignored. Finalists received three throws each, with the top eight competitors receiving an additional three attempts. The best distance among those six throws counted.

== Records ==
Prior to the competition, the existing world and Olympic records were as follows.

World record	Wolfgang Schmidt (GDR)	71.16	East Berlin, East Germany	9 August 1978
Olympic record	Mac Wilkins (USA)	68.28	Montréal, Canada	24 July 1976

No new world or Olympic records were set during the competition.

== Schedule ==
All times are Moscow Time (UTC+3)

Date	Time	Round
Sunday, 27 July 1980	10:00	Qualifying
Monday, 28 July 1980	17:30	Final

== Results ==
=== Qualifying round ===
The qualifying round was held on Sunday July 27, 1980.

Rank	Athlete	Nation	1	2	3	Distance	Notes
1	Imrich Bugár	Czechoslovakia	61.50	65.08	—	65.08	Q
2	Viktor Rashchupkin	Soviet Union	64.78	—	—	64.78	Q
3	Luis Delís	Cuba	64.20	—	—	64.20	Q
4	Ihor Duhinets	Soviet Union	63.10	—	—	63.10	Q
5	Yuriy Dumchev	Soviet Union	62.82	—	—	62.82	Q
6	Kenth Gardenkrans	Sweden	53.90	62.58	—	62.58	Q
7	Emil Vladimirov	Bulgaria	60.54	60.52	62.50	62.50	Q
8	Wolfgang Schmidt	East Germany	62.46	—	—	62.46	Q
9	Markku Tuokko	Finland	62.14	—	—	62.14	Q
10	Velko Velev	Bulgaria	54.82	56.60	61.30	61.30	q
11	José Santa Cruz	Cuba	60.14	58.70	X	60.14	q
12	Hilmar Hoßfeld	East Germany	X	57.98	59.92	59.92	q
13	Armin Lemme	East Germany	59.44	54.44	X	59.44	
14	Iosif Nagy	Romania	56.50	59.34	58.48	59.34	
15	Namakoro Niare	Mali	X	57.34	56.08	57.34	
16	Adnan Houri	Syria	X	X	47.52	47.52	
17	Najem Najem	Kuwait	X	39.26	35.38	39.26	
—	Oskar Jakobsson	Iceland	X	X	X	No mark	

=== Final ===
The home-nation officials may have provided some assistance to Raschupkin, as "Cuba's Luis Delís's final throw appeared to be a winning mark, but some observers thought it was marked at least a foot short."

Rank	Athlete	Nation	1	2	3	4	5	6	Distance
1st place, gold medalist(s)	Viktor Rashchupkin	Soviet Union	62.38	64.72	65.08	66.64	60.48	X	66.64
2nd place, silver medalist(s)	Imrich Bugár	Czechoslovakia	65.14	61.78	64.34	66.38	64.42	65.96	66.38
3rd place, bronze medalist(s)	Luis Delís	Cuba	X	63.46	X	65.30	X	66.32	66.32
4	Wolfgang Schmidt	East Germany	X	61.60	65.30	65.64	65.34	X	65.64
5	Yuriy Dumchev	Soviet Union	64.78	X	65.58	X	63.16	X	65.58
6	Ihor Duhinets	Soviet Union	62.18	64.04	63.18	X	62.04	X	64.04
7	Emil Vladimirov	Bulgaria	62.84	63.18	61.60	61.70	61.60	61.20	63.18
8	Velko Velev	Bulgaria	60.88	60.74	63.04	61.14	X	61.72	63.04
9	Markku Tuokko	Finland	61.54	55.32	61.84	Did not advance			61.84
10	José Santa Cruz	Cuba	56.06	58.52	61.52	Did not advance			61.52
11	Hilmar Hoßfeld	East Germany	60.26	61.14	59.30	Did not advance			61.14
12	Kenth Gardenkrans	Sweden	60.24	58.40	60.12	Did not advance			60.24

== See also ==
- 1978 Men's European Championships Discus Throw (Prague)
- 1982 Men's European Championships Discus Throw (Athens)
- 1983 Men's World Championships Discus Throw (Helsinki)
- 1986 Men's European Championships Discus Throw (Stuttgart)
- 1987 Men's World Championships Discus Throw (Rome)
