= Athletics at the Friendship Games – Men's discus throw =

The men's discus throw event at the Friendship Games was held on 17 August 1984 at the Grand Arena of the Central Lenin Stadium in Moscow, Soviet Union.

== Results ==
| Rank | Name | Nationality | #1 | #2 | #3 | #4 | #5 | #6 | Result | Notes |
|---|---|---|---|---|---|---|---|---|---|---|
| 1st place, gold medalist(s) | Yuriy Dumchev | Soviet Union | 64.78 | 66.70 | 66.30 | x | x | x | 66.70 | |
| 2nd place, silver medalist(s) | Juan Martínez | Cuba | 63.56 | 64.56 | 62.80 | 66.04 | 64.48 | 62.42 | 66.04 | |
| 3rd place, bronze medalist(s) | Jürgen Schult | East Germany | 64.00 | 64.02 | x | 62.82 | 66.02 | x | 66.02 | |
| 4 | Imrich Bugár | Czechoslovakia | | | | | | | 65.38 | |
| 5 | Géjza Valent | Czechoslovakia | | | | | | | 65.28 | |
| 6 | Luis Delís | Cuba | | | | | | | 64.78 | |
| 7 | Wolfgang Warnemünde | East Germany | | | | | | | 64.57 | |
| 8 | Romas Ubartas | Soviet Union | | | | | | | 63.70 | |
| 9 | Georgiy Kolnootchenko | Soviet Union | | | | | | | 63.50 | |
| 10 | Kamen Dimitrov | Bulgaria | | | | | | | 60.40 | |
| 11 | Velko Velev | Bulgaria | | | | | | | 60.00 | |

== See also ==
- Athletics at the 1984 Summer Olympics – Men's discus throw
