= 1978 European Athletics Championships – Men's discus throw =

Men's discus throw at the European Athletics Championships

The men's discus throw at the 1978 European Athletics Championships was held in Prague, then Czechoslovakia, at Stadion Evžena Rošického on 2 and 3 September 1978.

== Medalists ==
Gold	Wolfgang Schmidt; East Germany
Silver	Markku Tuokko; Finland
Bronze	Imrich Bugár; Czechoslovakia

== Results ==
=== Final ===
3 September

Rank	Name	Nationality	Result	Notes
1st place, gold medalist(s)	Wolfgang Schmidt	East Germany	66.82	
2nd place, silver medalist(s)	Markku Tuokko	Finland	64.90	
3rd place, bronze medalist(s)	Imrich Bugár	Czechoslovakia	64.66	
4	Velko Velev	Bulgaria	64.56	
5	Knut Hjeltnes	Norway	63.76	
6	Alwin Wagner	West Germany	62.70	
7	Dmitriy Kovtsun	Soviet Union	61.84	
8	Wolfgang Warnemünde	East Germany	61.28	
9	Ferenc Tégla	Hungary	60.22	
10	Ihor Duhinets	Soviet Union	59.80	
11	Óskar Jakobsson	Iceland	59.44	
12	Silvano Simeon	Italy	59.16	

=== Qualification ===
2 September

Rank	Name	Nationality	Result	Notes
1	Wolfgang Schmidt	East Germany	67.20	CR Q
2	Wolfgang Warnemünde	East Germany	63.80	Q
3	Markku Tuokko	Finland	62.82	Q
4	Knut Hjeltnes	Norway	62.36	Q
5	Alwin Wagner	West Germany	62.04	Q
6	Ihor Duhinets	Soviet Union	61.52	Q
7	Imrich Bugár	Czechoslovakia	60.96	Q
8	Dmitriy Kovtsun	Soviet Union	60.96	Q
9	Óskar Jakobsson	Iceland	60.86	Q
10	Ferenc Tégla	Hungary	59.82	Q
11	Velko Velev	Bulgaria	59.62	Q
12	Silvano Simeon	Italy	59.28	Q
13	Werner Hartmann	West Germany	59.14	
14	Dariusz Juzyszyn	Poland	58.86	
15	Ludvík Daněk	Czechoslovakia	58.60	
16	Armando De Vincentiis	Italy	58.20	
17	Frédéric Piette	France	57.54	
18	Josef Šilhavý	Czechoslovakia	57.28	
19	Juhani Tuomola	Finland	56.38	
20	János Faragó	Hungary	56.14	

== Participation ==
According to an unofficial count, 20 athletes from 12 countries participated in the event.

- Bulgaria (1)
- Czechoslovakia (3)
- East Germany (2)
- Finland (2)
- France (1)
- Hungary (2)
- Iceland (1)
- Italy (2)
- Norway (1)
- Poland (1)
- Soviet Union (2)
- West Germany (2)
