= Athletics at the 1981 Summer Universiade – Men's discus throw =

The men's discus throw event at the 1981 Summer Universiade was held at the Stadionul Naţional in Bucharest on 22 and 23 July 1981.

== Medalists ==
Gold	Silver	Bronze
Armin Lemme; East Germany	Wolfgang Warnemünde; East Germany	Ion Zamfirache; Romania

== Results ==
=== Qualification ===
Rank	Athlete	Nationality	Result	Notes
1	Georgiy Kolnootchenko	Soviet Union	62.54	
2	Wolfgang Warnemünde	East Germany	60.36	
3	Ion Zamfirache	Romania	60.08	
4	Armin Lemme	East Germany	58.98	
5	Dmitry Kovtsun	Soviet Union	58.40	
6	Dariusz Juzyszyn	Poland	58.16	
7	Scott Lofquist	United States	57.08	
8	Göran Svensson	Sweden	57.06	
9	Waldemar Wysocki	Poland	56.84	
10	Marco Martino	Italy	56.70	
11	Rolf Danneberg	West Germany	55.20	
12	Robert Weir	Great Britain	54.64	
13	Josef Kubeš	Czechoslovakia	53.02	
14	Stefan Korpos	Romania	51.64	
15	Raúl Calderón	Cuba	50.42	
16	Doug Barnett	United States	45.20	
17	Jihad Salame	Lebanon	35.30	

=== Final ===
Rank	Athlete	Nationality	Result	Notes
1st place, gold medalist(s)	Armin Lemme	East Germany	65.90	UR
2nd place, silver medalist(s)	Wolfgang Warnemünde	East Germany	63.54	
3rd place, bronze medalist(s)	Ion Zamfirache	Romania	63.40	
4	Dmitry Kovtsun	Soviet Union	61.92	
5	Georgiy Kolnootchenko	Soviet Union	61.56	
6	Rolf Danneberg	West Germany	57.60	
7	Dariusz Juzyszyn	Poland	57.26	
8	Robert Weir	Great Britain	56.42	
9	Waldemar Wysocki	Poland	55.64	
10	Marco Martino	Italy	55.30	
	Göran Svensson	Sweden	NM	
	Scott Lofquist	United States	DNS	
