= Athletics at the 1984 Summer Olympics – Men's discus throw =

Men's discus throw at the Games of the XXIII Olympiad
- Venue: Los Angeles Memorial Coliseum
- Dates: 8 August 1984 (qualifying); 10 August 1984 (final)
- Competitors: 20 from 14 nations
- Winning distance: 66.60

Medalists
1st place, gold medalist(s)		Rolf Danneberg; West Germany
2nd place, silver medalist(s)		Mac Wilkins; United States
3rd place, bronze medalist(s)		John Powell; United States

The men's discus throw at the 1984 Summer Olympics in Los Angeles, California had an entry list of 20 competitors from 14 nations, with two qualifying groups before the final (12) took place on August 10, 1984. The maximum number of athletes per nation had been set at 3 since the 1930 Olympic Congress. The event was won by Rolf Danneberg of West Germany, the nation's first medal in the men's discus throw and the first victory by any German athlete in the event (East Germany had won two silvers, neither pre-war Germany nor the United Team had won any medals). Mac Wilkins and John Powell of the United States won silver and bronze; they were the eighth and ninth men to win multiple discus throw medals (both had medaled in 1976). The United States continued its 19-Games streak of earning at least one medal every time it appeared, missing the podium only in the boycotted 1980 Games; however, this would be the last Games in that streak—and, in fact, the last medals the United States would earn in the event through at least 2020.

== Background ==
This was the 20th appearance of the event, which is one of 12 athletics events to have been held at every Summer Olympics. None of the finalists from the 1980 Games returned, mainly due to the Soviet-led boycott. The 1980 silver medalist Imrich Bugár of Czechoslovakia had won the first world championships in 1983, as well as the 1982 European championships; bronze medalist Luis Delís of Cuba was the 1983 Pan American champion; and fifth-place finisher Yuriy Dumchev of the Soviet Union set the world record in 1983. In their absence, the home nation American team was favored.

The Bahamas, Egypt, Mauritius, and Samoa each made their debut in the men's discus throw. The United States made its 19th appearance, most of any nation, having missed only the boycotted 1980 Games.

== Competition format ==
The competition used the two-round format introduced in 1936, with the qualifying round completely separate from the divided final. In qualifying, each athlete received three attempts; those recording a mark of at least 62.00 metres advanced to the final. If fewer than 12 athletes achieved that distance, the top 12 would advance. The results of the qualifying round were then ignored. Finalists received three throws each, with the top eight competitors receiving an additional three attempts. The best distance among those six throws counted.

== Records ==
Prior to the competition, the existing world and Olympic records were as follows.

World record	Yuriy Dumchev (URS)	71.86	Moscow, Soviet Union	29 May 1983
Olympic record	Mac Wilkins (USA)	68.28	Montréal, Canada	24 July 1976

No new world or Olympic records were set during the competition.

== Schedule ==
All times are Pacific Daylight Time (UTC-7)

Date	Time	Round
Wednesday, 8 August 1984	9:30	Qualifying
Friday, 10 August 1984	17:30	Final

== Results ==
=== Qualifying round ===
The qualifying round was held on August 8, 1984.

Rank	Athlete	Nation	1	2	3	Distance	Notes
1	Mac Wilkins	United States	60.54	65.86	—	65.86	Q
2	Rolf Danneberg	West Germany	59.66	63.48	—	63.48	Q
3	Luciano Zerbini	Italy	63.44	—	—	63.44	Q
4	John Powell	United States	62.92	—	—	62.92	Q
5	Stefan Fernholm	Sweden	X	62.84	—	62.84	Q
6	Art Burns	United States	62.60	—	—	62.60	Q
7	Erik de Bruin	Netherlands	60.76	61.06	61.56	61.56	q
8	Alwin Wagner	West Germany	X	61.56	X	61.56	q
9	Kostas Georgakopoulos	Greece	60.74	60.66	60.94	60.94	q
10	Robert Weir	Great Britain	X	X	60.92	60.92	q
11	Knut Hjeltnes	Norway	60.80	59.32	X	60.80	q
12	Marco Martino	Italy	59.58	60.76	X	60.76	q
13	Werner Hartmann	West Germany	57.90	59.88	59.92	59.92	
14	Robert Gray	Canada	56.38	56.62	59.34	59.34	
15	Richard Slaney	Great Britain	56.02	56.78	57.66	57.66	
16	Bradley Cooper	Bahamas	X	52.06	53.70	53.70	
17	Henry Smith	Samoa	51.28	50.94	51.90	51.90	
18	Dominique Béchard	Mauritius	39.84	41.10	40.24	41.10	
—	Mohamed Naguib Hamed	Egypt	X	—	—	No mark	
—	Vésteinn Hafsteinsson	Iceland	~~59.02~~	~~55.98~~	~~59.58~~	~~59.58~~	DPG
—	Marco Bucci	Italy	DNS				

=== Final ===
Rank	Athlete	Nation	1	2	3	4	5	6	Distance
1st place, gold medalist(s)	Rolf Danneberg	West Germany	64.74	X	63.64	66.60	X	66.22	66.60
2nd place, silver medalist(s)	Mac Wilkins	United States	65.96	X	65.20	X	66.30	X	66.30
3rd place, bronze medalist(s)	John Powell	United States	64.68	63.34	64.12	64.06	65.14	65.46	65.46
4	Knut Hjeltnes	Norway	64.72	62.40	65.28	63.78	62.50	64.32	65.28
5	Art Burns	United States	63.72	X	X	X	63.32	64.98	64.98
6	Alwin Wagner	West Germany	61.82	62.76	62.70	63.94	61.16	64.72	64.72
7	Luciano Zerbini	Italy	60.18	61.14	63.50	X	X	60.14	63.50
8	Stefan Fernholm	Sweden	63.08	X	62.20	63.22	62.20	59.82	63.22
9	Erik de Bruin	Netherlands	56.88	62.32	60.10	Did not advance			62.32
10	Robert Weir	Great Britain	59.86	61.36	X	Did not advance			61.36
11	Kostas Georgakopoulos	Greece	X	59.16	60.30	Did not advance			60.30
—	Marco Martino	Italy	X	X	X	Did not advance			No mark

== See also ==
- 1982 Men's European Championships Discus Throw (Athens)
- 1983 Men's World Championships Discus Throw (Helsinki)
- 1984 Men's Friendship Games Discus Throw (Moscow)
- 1986 Men's European Championships Discus Throw (Stuttgart)
- 1987 Men's World Championships Discus Throw (Rome)
