= Athletics at the 1977 Summer Universiade – Men's discus throw =

The men's discus throw event at the 1977 Summer Universiade was held at the Vasil Levski National Stadium in Sofia on 20 and 21 August.

== Medalists ==
Gold	Silver	Bronze
Nikolay Vikhor; Soviet Union	Vladimir Rayev; Soviet Union	Wolfgang Warnemünde; East Germany

== Results ==
=== Qualification ===
Rank	Group	Athlete	Nationality	Result	Notes
1	?	Julián Morrinson	Cuba	59.49	
2	?	Ion Zamfirache	Romania	59.28	
3	?	Nikolay Vikhor	Soviet Union	59.03	
4	?	Antonín Wybraniec	Czechoslovakia	58.34	
5	?	Wolfgang Warnemünde	East Germany	57.78	
6	?	Vladimir Rayev	Soviet Union	57.38	
7	?	Georgi Kostov	Bulgaria	57.30	
8	?	Luis Delís	Cuba	56.94	
9	?	Andrzej Bejrowski	Poland	56.50	
10	?	Oto Ozorák	Czechoslovakia	56.26	
11	?	Ray Burton	United States	56.22	
12	?	Emil Vladimirov	Bulgaria	56.12	
13	?	Art Burns	United States	56.08	
14	?	Dariusz Juzyszyn	Poland	55.48	
15	?	Vladimir Milić	Yugoslavia	55.24	
16	?	Jussi Isosaari	Finland	54.82	
17	?	René-Jean Coquin	France	52.46	
18	?	Ralph Fruguglietti	United States	51.92	
19	?	Philippe Heinrich	France	50.82	
20	?	Mohamed Bahri	Tunisia	39.62	
21	?	Hisham Al-Moumen	Kuwait	31.88	

=== Final ===
Rank	Athlete	Nationality	Result	Notes
1st place, gold medalist(s)	Nikolay Vikhor	Soviet Union	64.14	
2nd place, silver medalist(s)	Vladimir Rayev	Soviet Union	62.42	
3rd place, bronze medalist(s)	Wolfgang Warnemünde	East Germany	61.98	
4	Antonín Wybraniec	Czechoslovakia	61.56	
5	Julián Morrinson	Cuba	61.02	
6	Ion Zamfirache	Romania	60.72	
7	Emil Vladimirov	Bulgaria	59.28	
8	Luis Delís	Cuba	58.98	
9	Georgi Kostov	Bulgaria	56.62	
10	Oto Ozorák	Czechoslovakia	56.46	
11	Ray Burton	United States	55.34	
	Andrzej Bejrowski	Poland	DNS	
