= Athletics at the 1979 Summer Universiade – Men's discus throw =

The men's discus throw event at the 1979 Summer Universiade was held at the Estadio Olimpico Universitario in Mexico City on 10 September 1979.

== Results ==
Rank	Athlete	Nationality	Result	Notes
1st place, gold medalist(s)	Wolfgang Schmidt	East Germany	60.78	
2nd place, silver medalist(s)	Markku Tuokko	Finland	59.82	
3rd place, bronze medalist(s)	Antonín Wybraniec	Czechoslovakia	58.32	
4	Emil Vladimirov	Bulgaria	58.06	
5	Imrich Bugár	Czechoslovakia	57.66	
6	Daniel Gardner	Israel	56.32	
7	Óskar Jakobsson	Iceland	54.98	
8	Ken Stadel	United States	54.08	
9	Filippo Monforte	Italy	53.78	
10	Aleksandr Nazhimov	Soviet Union	51.10	
11	Rob Gray	Canada	50.72	
12	Mohamed Saidur Rob	Bangladesh	40.42	
13	Jaime López	Mexico	37.44	
