= 1983 World Championships in Athletics – Men's discus throw =

These are the official results of the Men's Discus Throw event at the 1983 World Championships in Helsinki, Finland. There were a total of 26 participating athletes, with the final held on Sunday August 14, 1983. The qualification mark was set at 63.00 metres.

== Medalists ==
Gold	Imrich Bugár; Czechoslovakia (TCH)
Silver	Luis Delis; Cuba (CUB)
Bronze	Géjza Valent; Czechoslovakia (TCH)

== Schedule ==
- All times are Eastern European Time (UTC+2)

Qualification Round
Group A	Group B
13.08.1983 – ??:??h	13.08.1983 – ??:??h
Final Round
14.08.1983 – ??:??h

== Abbreviations ==
- All results shown are in metres

Q	automatic qualification
q	qualification by rank
DNS	did not start
NM	no mark
WR	world record
AR	area record
NR	national record
PB	personal best
SB	season best

== Records ==
Standing records prior to the 1983 World Athletics Championships
World Record	Yuriy Dumchev (URS)	71.86 m	May 29, 1983	Moscow, Soviet Union
Event Record	New event			

== Qualification ==
RANK	GROUP A	DISTANCE
1.	Luis Delis (CUB)	64.20 m
2.	Géjza Valent (TCH)	63.98 m
3.	Georgiy Kolnootchenko (URS)	63.46 m
4.	Mac Wilkins (USA)	62.58 m
5.	Ihor Duhinets (URS)	62.42 m
6.	Ricky Bruch (SWE)	59.28 m
7.	John Powell (USA)	58.96 m
8.	Alwin Wagner (FRG)	58.96 m
9.	Rob Gray (CAN)	57.92 m
10.	Ion Zamfirache (ROU)	57.54 m
11.	Øystein Bjørbaek (NOR)	55.40 m
12.	Vesteinn Hafsteinsson (ISL)	55.20 m
13.	Li Weinan (CHN)	51.72 m

RANK	GROUP B	DISTANCE
1.	Imrich Bugár (TCH)	65.00 m
2.	Ari Huumonen (FIN)	63.76 m
3.	Jürgen Schult (GDR)	62.80 m
4.	Bradley Cooper (BAH)	62.72 m
5.	Art Burns (USA)	61.88 m
6.	Juan Martínez (CUB)	60.92 m
7.	Knut Hjeltnes (NOR)	60.10 m
8.	Konstantinos Georgakopoulos (GRE)	59.54 m
9.	Yuriy Dumchev (URS)	58.84 m
10.	Werner Hartmann (FRG)	58.48 m
11.	Iosif Nagy (ROU)	58.34 m
12.	Hamed Mohamed Naguib (EGY)	56.62 m
13.	Adnan Houry (SYR)	48.34 m

== Final ==
RANK	FINAL	DISTANCE
	Imrich Bugár (TCH)	67.72 m
	Luis Delis (CUB)	67.36 m
	Géjza Valent (TCH)	66.08 m
4.	Ari Huumonen (FIN)	65.44 m
5.	Jürgen Schult (GDR)	64.92 m
6.	Georgiy Kolnootchenko (URS)	63.74 m
7.	Juan Martínez (CUB)	64.26 m
8.	Art Burns (USA)	63.22 m
9.	Knut Hjeltnes (NOR)	62.26 m
10.	Mac Wilkins (USA)	61.46 m
11.	Ihor Duhinets (URS)	60.44 m
12.	Bradley Cooper (BAH)	58.70 m

== See also ==
- 1980 Men's Olympic Discus Throw (Moscow)
- 1982 Men's European Championships Discus Throw (Athens)
- 1984 Men's Olympic Discus Throw (Los Angeles)
- 1986 Men's European Championships Discus Throw (Stuttgart)
