= Athletics at the 1985 Summer Universiade – Men's discus throw =

The men's discus throw event at the 1985 Summer Universiade was held at the Kobe Universiade Memorial Stadium in Kobe on 4 September 1985.

== Results ==
Rank	Athlete	Nationality	Result	Notes
1st place, gold medalist(s)	Luis Delís	Cuba	66.84	
2nd place, silver medalist(s)	Vaclavas Kidykas	Soviet Union	63.12	
3rd place, bronze medalist(s)	Juan Martínez Brito	Cuba	63.02	
4	Erik de Bruin	Netherlands	62.94	
5	Chris Okoye	Nigeria	62.92	
6	Mike Buncic	United States	60.96	
7	Gary Williky	United States	59.44	
8	Ray Lazdins	Canada	56.70	
9	Romas Ubartas	Soviet Union	54.72	
10	Yuko Maeda	Japan	54.68	
11	Marco Martino	Italy	54.40	
12	Shakti Singh	India	49.12	
13	Nejim Abdulrazak al Enazy	Kuwait	45.90	
14	Erastus Mogoa	Kenya	38.56	
	Nobukatsu Chinen	Japan	NM	
