= Athletics at the 1987 Pan American Games – Men's discus throw =

Men's discus throw at the Pan American Games

The men's discus throw event at the 1987 Pan American Games was held in Indianapolis, United States on 12 August.

== Results ==
Rank	Name	Nationality	#1	#2	#3	#4	#5	#6	Result	Notes
1st place, gold medalist(s)	Luis Delís	Cuba	64.92	64.68	65.98	67.14	65.36	65.50	67.14	
2nd place, silver medalist(s)	Brad Cooper	Bahamas	62.32	60.80	x	x	59.74	64.56	64.56	
3rd place, bronze medalist(s)	Randy Heisler	United States	61.28	x	61.56	x	62.76	61.26	62.76	
4	Juan Martínez Brito	Cuba	x	62.06	62.56	61.36	x	x	62.56	
5	Art Burns	United States	x	58.90	x	59.74	x	x	59.74	
6	Ray Lazdins	Canada	x	56.22	58.92	58.96	55.46	57.74	58.96	
7	José de Souza	Brazil	x	x	57.24	x	56.22	x	57.24	
8	Carlos Bryner	Argentina	47.10	53.20	x	54.44	x	51.34	54.44	
9	James Dedier	Trinidad and Tobago	49.38	x	45.80				49.38	
10	Andrés Charadía	Argentina	45.40	45.42	46.60				46.60	
11	Anthony George	Grenada	x	x	38.10				38.10	
