= Athletics at the 1988 Summer Olympics – Men's discus throw =

Men's discus throw at the Games of the XXIV Olympiad
- Pictogram for athletics
- Venue: Olympic Stadium
- Date: 30 September 1988 (qualifications); 1 October 1988 (finals)
- Competitors: 29 from 20 nations
- Winning distance: 68.82 OR

Medalists
1st place, gold medalist(s)		Jürgen Schult; East Germany
2nd place, silver medalist(s)		Romas Ubartas; Soviet Union
3rd place, bronze medalist(s)		Rolf Danneberg; West Germany

The men's discus throw event at the 1988 Summer Olympics in Seoul, South Korea had an entry list of 29 competitors from 20 nations, with two qualifying groups before the final (12) took place on Saturday October 1, 1988. The maximum number of athletes per nation had been set at 3 since the 1930 Olympic Congress. The event was won by Jürgen Schult of East Germany, the nation's first victory in the men's discus throw and first medal since 1976. Romas Ubartas of the Soviet Union took silver, while Rolf Danneberg of West Germany earned bronze. Danneberg was the 10th man to win multiple discus throw medals, adding to his 1984 gold. For the first time, the United States competed in the event but did not make the podium (the Americans had previously failed to win a medal in the men's discus throw only in 1980, when the nation boycotted the Olympics).

== Background ==
This was the 21st appearance of the event, which is one of 12 athletics events to have been held at every Summer Olympics. The returning finalists from the 1984 Games were gold medalist Rolf Danneberg of West Germany, silver medalist (and 1976 gold medalist) Mac Wilkins of the United States, fourth-place finisher Knut Hjeltnes of Norway, and ninth-place finisher Erik de Bruin of the Netherlands. Jürgen Schult of East Germany was favored; he had won the 1987 world championships and set a world record of 74.08 metres in 1986 that still stands as of 2020.

Nigeria and Paraguay each made their debut in the men's discus throw. The United States made its 20th appearance, most of any nation, having missed only the boycotted 1980 Games.

== Competition format ==
The competition used the two-round format introduced in 1936, with the qualifying round completely separate from the divided final. In qualifying, each athlete received three attempts; those recording a mark of at least 64.00 metres advanced to the final. If fewer than 12 athletes achieved that distance, the top 12 would advance. The results of the qualifying round were then ignored. Finalists received three throws each, with the top eight competitors receiving an additional three attempts. The best distance among those six throws counted.

== Records ==
Prior to the competition, the existing world and Olympic records were as follows.

World record	Jürgen Schult (GDR)	74.08	Neubrandenburg, East Germany	6 June 1986
Olympic record	Mac Wilkins (USA)	68.28	Montréal, Canada	24 July 1976

Jürgen Schult's first throw in the final broke the Olympic record, setting a new one at 68.82 metres.

== Schedule ==
All times are Korea Standard Time adjusted for daylight savings (UTC+10)

Date	Time	Round
Friday, 30 September 1988	9:30	Qualifying
Saturday, 1 October 1988	12:45	Final

== Results ==
=== Qualifying ===
Rank	Athlete	Nation	1	2	3	Distance	Notes
1	Rolf Danneberg	West Germany	65.70	—	—	65.70	Q
2	Romas Ubartas	Soviet Union	65.58	—	—	65.58	Q
3	Jürgen Schult	East Germany	64.70	—	—	64.70	Q
4	Knut Hjeltnes	Norway	63.50	62.66	X	63.50	q
5	Gejza Valent	Czechoslovakia	61.88	62.84	63.46	63.46	q
6	Mike Buncic	United States	X	63.16	X	63.16	q
7	Mac Wilkins	United States	62.48	X	61.34	62.48	q
8	Yuriy Dumchev	Soviet Union	61.30	60.24	62.08	62.08	q
9	Imrich Bugár	Czechoslovakia	61.94	61.48	61.00	61.94	q
10	Erik de Bruin	Netherlands	58.56	60.72	61.66	61.66	q
11	Alois Hannecker	West Germany	61.44	X	X	61.44	q
12	Georgi Georgiev	Bulgaria	59.78	61.34	X	61.34	q
13	Vaclavas Kidykas	Soviet Union	58.82	60.88	X	60.88	
14	Svein-Inge Valvik	Norway	59.40	X	60.64	60.64	
15	Werner Reiterer	Australia	X	57.58	59.78	59.78	
16	Bradley Cooper	Bahamas	59.74	56.88	56.44	59.74	
17	Randy Heisler	United States	X	X	59.08	59.08	
18	Patrick Journoud	France	58.94	57.62	55.82	58.94	
19	Vésteinn Hafsteinsson	Iceland	58.94	57.10	55.70	58.94	
20	Paul Mardle	Great Britain	57.18	56.06	58.28	58.28	
21	Ray Lazdins	Canada	57.94	X	X	57.94	
22	Wulf Brunner	West Germany	X	57.50	X	57.50	
23	Adewale Olukoju	Nigeria	51.38	54.44	47.60	54.44	
24	Ramón Jiménez Gaona	Paraguay	50.18	48.80	50.90	50.90	
25	Henry Smith	Samoa	47.96	49.40	48.98	49.40	
26	Min Se-hun	South Korea	X	46.52	47.84	47.84	
—	Ibrahim Mohamed Al-Ouiran	Saudi Arabia	X	X	X	No mark	
—	Eggert Bogason	Iceland	X	X	X	No mark	
—	Mohamed Hamed Naguib	Egypt	X	X	X	No mark	

=== Final ===
Rank	Athlete	Nation	1	2	3	4	5	6	Distance	Notes
1st place, gold medalist(s)	Jürgen Schult	East Germany	68.82 OR	67.92	65.76	68.18	65.70	68.26	68.82	OR
2nd place, silver medalist(s)	Romas Ubartas	Soviet Union	66.86	66.20	66.24	64.40	63.74	67.48	67.48	
3rd place, bronze medalist(s)	Rolf Danneberg	West Germany	65.58	63.60	X	63.88	67.38	62.56	67.38	
4	Yuriy Dumchev	Soviet Union	64.00	63.74	63.54	63.66	62.86	66.42	66.42	
5	Mac Wilkins	United States	61.88	X	65.12	63.84	65.90	62.96	65.90	
6	Géjza Valent	Czechoslovakia	X	63.36	62.46	62.80	64.28	65.80	65.80	
7	Knut Hjeltnes	Norway	63.30	X	64.10	64.94	63.22	X	64.94	
8	Alois Hannecker	West Germany	60.28	62.50	63.28	60.94	61.54	X	63.28	
9	Erik de Bruin	Netherlands	63.06	X	X	Did not advance			63.06	
10	Mike Buncic	United States	62.46	X	X	Did not advance			62.46	
11	Gueorgui Gueorguiev	Bulgaria	61.24	61.12	59.66	Did not advance			61.24	
12	Imrich Bugár	Czechoslovakia	59.60	X	60.88	Did not advance			60.88	

== See also ==
- 1986 Men's European Championships Discus Throw (Stuttgart)
- 1987 Men's World Championships Discus Throw (Rome)
- 1990 Men's European Championships Discus Throw (Split)
- 1991 Men's World Championships Discus Throw (Tokyo)
