= Athletics at the 1975 Summer Universiade – Men's discus throw =

The men's discus throw event at the 1975 Summer Universiade was held at the Stadio Olimpico in Rome on 21 September.

== Results ==
Rank	Athlete	Nationality	Result	Notes
1st place, gold medalist(s)	Markku Tuokko	Finland	62.94	
2nd place, silver medalist(s)	Ferenc Tégla	Hungary	58.10	
3rd place, bronze medalist(s)	Igor Spasovkhodskiy	Soviet Union	57.80	
4	Bishop Dolegiewicz	Canada	56.66	
5	Borys Chambul	Canada	55.38	
6	Georges Schroeder	Belgium	54.92	
7	Viktor Raschchupkin	Soviet Union	54.40	
8	Emil Vladimirov	Bulgaria	53.70	
9	Guy Dirkin	Great Britain	50.76	
10	Giovanni Rastelli	Italy	48.02	
11	Tharwat Said	Egypt	43.42	
12	José Luiz Carabolante	Brazil	41.56	
13	Mohamed Al-Zinkawi	Kuwait	34.10	
14	Al-Hazani	Kuwait	27.98	
	Massimo Botti	Italy	NM	
