= 1973 European Athletics Junior Championships =

- Level: Under 20
- Events: 36

The 1973 European Athletics Junior Championships was the second edition of the biennial athletics competition for European athletes aged under twenty. It was held in Duisburg, West Germany between 24 and 26 August.

== Men's results ==
Event	Gold		Silver		Bronze	
100 metres	Klaus-Dieter Kurrat (GDR)	10.42	Petar Petrov (BUL)	10.49	Jerzy Wieczorek (POL)	10.57
200 metres	Klaus-Dieter Kurrat (GDR)	21.01	Petar Petrov (BUL)	21.12	Jerzy Wieczorek (POL)	21.20
400 metres	Fons Brijdenbach (BEL)	45.86	Jürgen Utikal (GDR)	46.73	Dietmar Krug (GDR)	46.81
800 metres	Steve Ovett (GBR)	1:47.53	Willi Wülbeck (FRG)	1:47.57	Erwin Gohlke (GDR)	1:47.83
1500 metres	Gheorghe Ghipu (ROM)	3:45.78	Nicolae Onescu (ROM)	3:46.07	Bernhard Vifian (SUI)	3:46.70
3000 metres	Hans-Jürgen Orthmann (FRG)	8:03.4	Klaus-Peter Weippert (GDR)	8:03.6	Ulo Kriisa (URS)	8:04.6
5000 metres	Fernando Cerrada (ESP)	14:01.8	Enn Sellik (URS)	14:11.8	Nikolay Radostyev (URS)	14:16.0
110 m hurdles	Vyacheslav Naydenko (URS)	14.42	Volker Warbende (FRG)	14.43	Gus McKenzie (GBR)	14.46
400 m hurdles	Jerzy Pietrzyk (POL)	50.07	Fedor Ekelmann (GDR)	50.88	Vladimir Nagaynik (URS)	51.10
2000 m s'chase	Frank Baumgartl (GDR)	5:28.14	Vladimir Kanev (BUL)	5:28.36	Magnus Tellander (SWE)	5:32.66
10,000 m walk	Hartwig Gauder (GDR)	44:13.6	Evgeni Semerdzhiev (BUL)	44:41.6	Angelo Di Chio (ITA)	45:31.4
4 × 100 m relay	East Germany (GDR); Hans-Jürgen Gerhardt; Jürgen Hellmann; Klaus-Dieter Kurrat; Andreas Kühne	40.03	France (FRA); Serge Dalbon; Philippe Lemaitre; Gilles Douezi; Alain Gracieux	40.26	West Germany (FRG); Karl-Heinz Weisenseel; Klaus-Günther Lemke; Rüdiger Harksen; Helmut Leibner	40.66
4 × 400 m relay	East Germany (GDR); Udo Gehrmann; Erwin Gohlke; Jürgen Utikal; Dietmar Krug	3:06.77	Poland (POL); Zdzisław Sobieraj; Janusz Wysocki; Krzysztof Kołodziej; Jerzy Pietrzyk	3:07.09	Great Britain (GBR); Christopher van Rees; Bob Benn; Roger Jenkins; Glen Cohen	3:07.29
Pole vault	Sergey Krivozub (URS)	5.00 m	Bruno Sestier (FRA)	4.80 m	Roger Thorstensson (SWE) Gianpaolo Gaspari (ITA)	4.65 m
High jump	Franck Bonnet (FRA)	2.14 m	Serhiy Senyukov (URS)	2.14 m	Giordano Ferrari (ITA)	2.12 m
Long jump	Frank Wartenberg (GDR)	7.85 m	Jochen Verschl (FRG)	7.59 m	Jean-Hervé Stievenart (FRA)	7.54 m
Triple jump	Lothar Gora (GDR)	16.29 m	Ramón Cid (ESP)	16.06 m	Jean-Hervé Stievenart (FRA)	15.82 m
Shot put	Udo Beyer (GDR)	19.65 m	Wolfgang Schmidt (GDR)	18.45 m	Mieczysław Bręczewski (POL)	17.42 m
Discus throw	Wolfgang Schmidt (GDR)	58.16 m	Kenth Gardenkrans (SWE)	56.84 m	Nikolay Vikhor (URS)	56.84 m
Javelin throw	Gerd Elze (GDR)	75.86 m	Gheorghe Megelea (ROM)	74.68 m	Bent Larsen (DEN)	73.46 m
Hammer throw	Yuriy Sedykh (URS)	67.32 m	Pavel Ryepin (URS)	63.58 m	Manfred Sens (GDR)	62.06 m
Decathlon	Vladimir Buryakov (URS)	7554 pts	Dieter Leyckes (FRG)	7371 pts	Claus Marek (FRG)	7370 pts

== Women's results ==
Event	Gold		Silver		Bronze	
100 metres	Sonia Lannaman (GBR)	11.73	Nadine Goletto (FRA)	11.77	Jutta Fernys (GDR)	11.80
200 metres	Bärbel Eckert (GDR)	22.85	Ildikó Szabó (HUN)	23.62	Elfriede Meierholz (FRG)	23.66
400 metres	Bettine Wolfrum (GDR)	53.28	Ann Larsson (SWE)	53.34	Rosine Wallez (BEL)	53.68
800 metres	Anita Barkusky (GDR)	2:03.30	Lesley Kiernan (GBR)	2:03.66	Nadezhda Zabozhko (URS)	2:03.83
1500 metres	Inger Knutsson (SWE)	4:07.47	Doris Gluth (GDR)	4:16.96	Veronika Hansen (GDR)	4:17.32
100 m hurdles	Bärbel Eckert (GDR)	13.14	Chantal Réga (FRA)	13.38	Gudrun Berend (GDR)	13.43
4 × 100 m relay	East Germany (GDR); Heidrun Nagorka; Bärbel Eckert; Gudrun Berend; Jutta Fernys	44.37	West Germany (FRG); Brigitte Rubner; Elfriede Meierholz; Dagmar Schenten; Elvira Springsguth	45.27	Great Britain (GBR); Barbara Martin; Wendy Hill; Donna Murray; Sonia Lannaman	45.38
4 × 400 m relay	East Germany (GDR); Heiderose Arbeiter; Waltraud Kämpf; Anita Barkusky; Bettine Wolfrum	3:34.35	Great Britain (GBR); Janet Ravenscroft; Evelyn McMeekin; Ruth Kennedy; Susan Pettett	3:36.98	Poland (POL); Grażyna Siewierska; Genowefa Nowaczyk; Bernarda Zalewska; Barbara Kwietniewska	3:37.03
High jump	Ellen Mundinger (FRG)	1.82 m	Annemieke Bouma (NED) Ulrike Meyfarth (FRG)	1.80 m	Not awarded	
Long jump	Heidemarie Anders (GDR)	6.36 m	Gunhild Hetzel (FRG)	6.28 m	Doina Spinu (ROM)	6.28 m
Shot put	Ilona Schoknecht (GDR)	17.05 m	Marina Hein (GDR)	16.97 m	Ruska Dzhendova (BUL)	16.21 m
Discus throw	Evelin Schlaak (GDR)	60.00 m	Ilona Schoknecht (GDR)	52.92 m	Danuta Cymer (POL)	51.12 m
Javelin throw	Tonya Khristova (BUL)	54.84 m	Anneliese Kopsch (GDR)	52.94 m	Maria Jabłońska (POL)	50.44 m
Pentathlon	Bärbel Müller (GDR)	4519 pts	Sue Mapstone (GBR)	4105 pts	Ulrike Göhring (FRG)	4067 pts

== Medal table ==
Rank	Nation	Gold	Silver	Bronze	Total
1	East Germany (GDR)	21	9	5	35
2	Soviet Union (URS)	4	3	5	12
3	West Germany (FRG)	2	7	4	13
4	Great Britain (GBR)	2	2	3	7
5	France (FRA)	1	4	2	7
6	Bulgaria (BUL)	1	4	1	6
7	Sweden (SWE)	1	2	2	5
8	Romania (ROU)	1	2	1	4
9	Poland (POL)	1	1	6	8
10	Spain (ESP)	1	1	0	2
11	Belgium (BEL)	1	0	1	2
12	Hungary (HUN)	0	1	0	1
12	Netherlands (NED)	0	1	0	1
14	Italy (ITA)	0	0	3	3
15	Denmark (DEN)	0	0	1	1
15	Switzerland (SUI)	0	0	1	1
Totals (16 entries)		36	37	35	108
