= Werner Hartmann (disambiguation) =

Werner Hartmann (1902–1963) was a German World War II U-boat commander.

Werner Hartmann may also refer to:

- Werner Hartmann (physicist) (1912–1988), German physicist studying microelectronics
- Werner Hartmann (discus thrower) (born 1959), former West German discus thrower
- Werner Hartmann (wrestler) (born 1942), Austrian Olympic wrestler
