= Athletics at the 1978 Commonwealth Games – Men's discus throw =

Men's discus throw at the Commonwealth Games

The men's discus throw event at the 1978 Commonwealth Games was held on 11 August at the Commonwealth Stadium in Edmonton, Alberta, Canada.

== Results ==
Rank	Name	Nationality	Result	Notes
1st place, gold medalist(s)	Borys Chambul	Canada	59.70	
2nd place, silver medalist(s)	Bradley Cooper	Bahamas	57.30	
3rd place, bronze medalist(s)	Robert Gray	Canada	55.48	
4	Robin Tait	New Zealand	55.22	
5	Wayne Martin	Australia	54.98	
6	Pete Tancred	England	54.78	
7	John Hillier	England	52.26	
8	Richard Priman	Australia	50.42	
9	Mike Winch	England	50.22	
10	Praveen Kumar	India	49.42	
11	John Ruto	Kenya	43.14	
	Michael Obange	Kenya	NM	
	Zbigniew Dolegiewicz	Canada	DNS	
