= Athletics at the 1990 Commonwealth Games – Men's discus throw =

Men's discus throw at the Commonwealth Games

The men's discus throw event at the 1990 Commonwealth Games was held at the Mount Smart Stadium in Auckland.

== Results ==
Rank	Name	Nationality	Result	Notes
1st place, gold medalist(s)	Adewale Olukoju	Nigeria	62.62	
2nd place, silver medalist(s)	Werner Reiterer	Australia	61.56	
3rd place, bronze medalist(s)	Paul Nandapi	Australia	59.94	
4	Bradley Cooper	Bahamas	58.98	
5	Paul Mardle	England	58.76	
6	Raymond Lazdins	Canada	57.84	
7	Graham Savory	England	57.44	
8	Darrin Morris	Scotland	56.10	
9	Robert McManus	Canada	53.66	
10	Mark Robinson	New Zealand	53.64	
	Abi Ekoku	England	NM	
