= 1986 World Junior Championships in Athletics – Men's discus throw =

The men's discus throw event at the 1986 World Junior Championships in Athletics was held in Athens, Greece, at Olympic Stadium on 16 and 17 July. A 2 kg (senior implement) discus was used.

== Medalists ==
Gold	Vasil Baklarov; Bulgaria
Silver	Werner Reiterer; Australia
Bronze	Vasiliy Kaptyukh; Soviet Union

== Results ==
=== Final ===
17 July

Rank	Name	Nationality	Result	Notes
1st place, gold medalist(s)	Vasil Baklarov	Bulgaria	60.60	
2nd place, silver medalist(s)	Werner Reiterer	Australia	58.64	
3rd place, bronze medalist(s)	Vasiliy Kaptyukh	Soviet Union	58.22	
4	Lars Riedel	East Germany	58.16	
5	Attila Horváth	Hungary	58.04	
6	Rosen Velinov	Bulgaria	56.16	
7	Adewale Olukoju	Nigeria	54.00	
8	Tomáš Panácek	Czechoslovakia	53.82	
9	Bentley Laidler	Australia	53.70	
10	Andrey Kokhanovskiy	Soviet Union	53.66	
11	Zdenek Kohout	Czechoslovakia	53.12	
12	David Martínez	Spain	52.32	

=== Qualifications ===
16 Jul

==== Group A ====
Rank	Name	Nationality	Result	Notes
1	Andrey Kokhanovskiy	Soviet Union	59.00	Q
2	Lars Riedel	East Germany	52.92	Q
3	Adewale Olukoju	Nigeria	52.90	Q
4	Zdenek Kohout	Czechoslovakia	51.46	Q
5	Rosen Velinov	Bulgaria	51.44	Q
6	Bentley Laidler	Australia	51.36	Q
7	David Martínez	Spain	49.68	q
8	Rolando Ribalta	Cuba	47.68	
9	Simon Williams	United Kingdom	46.95	
10	Thomas Rosvold	Norway	46.76	
11	Steve Yates	United States	46.02	
12	Offer Gershon	Israel	45.42	
13	Ramón Jiménez Gaona	Paraguay	43.42	
14	Dave Stackin	Canada	40.72	
15	Yasser Farag	Egypt	31.70	
	Alpheus Potter	British Virgin Islands	NM	
	Khalid Al-Khalidi	Saudi Arabia	NM	

==== Group B ====
Rank	Name	Nationality	Result	Notes
1	Attila Horváth	Hungary	57.18	Q
2	Vasiliy Kaptyukh	Soviet Union	54.02	Q
3	Werner Reiterer	Australia	52.22	Q
4	Vasil Baklarov	Bulgaria	52.20	Q
5	Tomáš Panácek	Czechoslovakia	51.10	Q
6	Karsten Nuelken	East Germany	49.66	
7	Brent Patera	United States	48.82	
8	Alexis Elizalde	Cuba	47.78	
9	Joachim Tidow	West Germany	47.14	
10	Lars Ola Sundt	Norway	45.48	
11	Michel Leroux	Zimbabwe	43.12	
12	Gerardo Piñero	Argentina	42.78	
13	Troy Patterson	Barbados	40.98	
14	Mahmoud Mustapha Jalal	Kuwait	39.04	
15	Robert Pilo	Canada	38.12	
16	Nicos Anastasiades	Cyprus	37.78	
17	Jaime Comandari	El Salvador	37.14	
18	James Wong Tuck Yim	Singapore	35.42	

== Participation ==
According to an unofficial count, 35 athletes from 26 countries participated in the event.

- Argentina (1)
- Australia (2)
- Barbados (1)
- British Virgin Islands (1)
- Bulgaria (2)
- Canada (2)
- Cuba (2)
- Cyprus (1)
- Czechoslovakia (2)
- East Germany (2)
- Egypt (1)
- El Salvador (1)
- Hungary (1)
- Israel (1)
- Kuwait (1)
- Nigeria (1)
- Norway (2)
- Paraguay (1)
- Saudi Arabia (1)
- Singapore (1)
- Soviet Union (2)
- Spain (1)
- United Kingdom (1)
- United States (2)
- West Germany (1)
- Zimbabwe (1)
