= David Martínez (discus thrower) =

Spanish discus thrower (born 1967)

Personal information
- Born: 31 January 1967 (age 58) Betanzos, A Coruña

Sport
- Country: Spain
- Sport: Discus throw

David Martínez Varela (born 31 January 1967 in Betanzos, A Coruña) is a retired discus thrower from Spain, who represented his native country at three consecutive Summer Olympics, starting in 1992. He is a ten-time national champion in the men's discus event.

== International competitions ==
Year	Competition	Venue	Position	Notes
Representing Spain
1986	World Junior Championships	Athens, Greece	12th	52.32 m
1987	Mediterranean Games	Latakia, Syria	9th	52.34 m
1989	World Cup	Barcelona, Spain	6th	57.46 m
1990	Ibero-American Championships	Manaus, Brazil	1st	59.30 m
1991	Mediterranean Games	Athens, Greece	3rd	59.16 m
1992	Ibero-American Championships	Seville, Spain	2nd	61.56 m
2000	Olympic Games	Sydney, Australia	19th (q)	61.50 m
2001	Mediterranean Games	Radès, Tunisia	2nd	63.85 m
2002	European Championships	Munich, Germany	19th (q)	59.27 m
