= Jean-Hervé Stievenart =

French triple jumper (1954–2022)

Personal information
- Nationality: French
- Born: 15 October 1954 Amiens, France
- Died: 27 June 2022 (aged 67)

Sport
- Sport: Track and field
- Event: Triple jump

Jean-Hervé Stievenart (15 October 1954 – 27 June 2022) was a French triple jumper.

== Life and career ==
Stievenart was born in Amiens, the son of a triple jumper.

Stievenart placed third at the 1973 European Athletics Junior Championships with a long jump of 7.54 meters and a triple jump of 15.82 meters. His personal triple jump record was 16.21 meters, set in Paris.

Stievenart was the coach of Benjamin Compaoré and Teddy Tamgho before retiring on 31 December 2020.

== Death ==
Stievenart died on 27 June 2022 at the age of 67.
