= Julián Morrinson =

Cuban discus thrower

Personal information
- Born: July 27, 1951 (age 75) Morón, Cuba
- Height: 1.90 m (6 ft 3 in)
- Weight: 105 kg (231 lb)
Medal record
Men's Athletics
Representing Cuba
Pan American Games
| Silver medal – second place | 1975 Mexico City | Discus Throw |
Central American and Caribbean Games
| Gold medal – first place | 1974 Santo Domingo | Discus Throw |
| Silver medal – second place | 1978 Medellin | Discus Throw |

Julián Alberto Morrinson Gales (Spanish pronunciation: [xuˈljam ˈmorinson]; born July 27, 1951) is a former discus thrower from Cuba. He competed for his native country at the 1976 Summer Olympics in Montréal, Quebec, Canada, where he did not reach the final in the men's discus throw event. He won the gold medal at the 1974 Central American and Caribbean Games.

His personal best is 64.18 metres set in 1977.

== International competitions ==
| Year | Competition | Venue | Position | Event | Notes |
Representing Cuba
| 1970 | Central American and Caribbean Games | Panama City, Panama | 5th | Discus throw | 51.10 m |
| 1970 | Universiade | Turin, Italy | 12th | Discus throw | 48.80 m |
| 1973 | Central American and Caribbean Championships | Maracaibo, Venezuela | 1st | Discus throw | 57.58 m |
| 1974 | Central American and Caribbean Games | Santo Domingo, Dominican Republic | 1st | Discus throw | 58.10 m |
| 1975 | Pan American Games | Mexico City, Mexico | 2nd | Discus throw | 59.88 m |
| 1976 | Olympic Games | Montreal, Canada | 16th (q) | Discus throw | 59.92 m |
| 1977 | Central American and Caribbean Championships | Xalapa, Mexico | 1st | Discus throw | 60.82 m |
| 1977 | Universiade | Sofia, Bulgaria | 5th | Discus throw | 61.02 m |
| 1977 | World Cup | Düsseldorf, West Germany | 5th | Discus throw | 58.98 m^{1} |
| 1978 | Central American and Caribbean Games | Medellín, Colombia | 2nd | Discus throw | 58.56 m |

^{1}Representing the Americas
