= Carl Brown (discus thrower) =

American discus thrower

Carl Anthony Brown (born February 11, 1970) is an American discus thrower and a one-time US national champion (2003) in the men's discus event. Brown was born in Albion, Michigan.

== Career ==
He won the 2003 USA Track and Field National Championship and was ranked 6th in the world by Track & Field News after finishing eighth at the 2003 World Championships. His lifetime best throw of 66.66 metres was the winning throw at the 2003 USA National Championships held in Palo Alto.
