= Min Se-hun =

South Korean discus thrower

Personal information
- Nationality: South Korean
- Born: 26 July 1963 (age 62)

Sport
- Sport: Athletics
- Event: Discus throw

Min Se-hun (born 26 July 1963) is a South Korean athlete. He competed in the men's discus throw at the 1988 Summer Olympics.
