= Athletics at the 1971 Pan American Games – Men's discus throw =

Men's discus throw at the Pan American Games

The men's discus throw event at the 1971 Pan American Games was held in Cali on 1 August.

== Results ==
Rank	Name	Nationality	Result	Notes
1st place, gold medalist(s)	Dick Drescher	United States	62.26	GR
2nd place, silver medalist(s)	Tim Vollme	United States	61.06	
3rd place, bronze medalist(s)	Ain Roost	Canada	58.06	
4	Javier Moreno	Cuba	57.90	
5	Sérgio Thomé	Brazil	54.40	
6	Dagoberto González	Colombia	51.76	
7	José Carlos Jacques	Brazil	51.16	
8	Ramón Mejía	Nicaragua	45.32	
9	Wilfred Burgos	Suriname	37.36	
