= Athletics at the 1978 Commonwealth Games – Men's shot put =

Men's shot put at the Commonwealth Games

The men's shot put event at the 1978 Commonwealth Games was held on 12 August at the Commonwealth Stadium in Edmonton, Alberta, Canada.

== Results ==
Rank	Name	Nationality	Result	Notes
1st place, gold medalist(s)	Geoff Capes	England	19.77	
2nd place, silver medalist(s)	Bruno Pauletto	Canada	19.33	
3rd place, bronze medalist(s)	Zbigniew Dolegiewicz	Canada	18.45	
4	Michael Mercer	Canada	17.83	
5	Mike Winch	England	16.93	
6	Robert Dale	England	16.89	
7	Bahadur Chauhan	India	16.57	
8	Jugraj Mann	India	16.50	
9	Gurdeep Singh	India	15.74	
10	Wayne Martin	Australia	15.54	
11	Keith Falle	Jersey	15.32	
12	Bradley Cooper	Bahamas	14.92	
13	Michael Obange	Kenya	13.68	
