= José Santa Cruz (athlete) =

Cuban athletics competitor

Personal information
- Nationality: Cuban
- Born: 3 June 1954 (age 72)

Sport
- Sport: Athletics
- Event: Discus throw

José Santa Cruz (born 3 June 1954) is a Cuban athlete. He competed in the men's discus throw at the 1980 Summer Olympics.
