= Athletics at the 1991 Pan American Games – Men's discus throw =

Men's discus throw at the Pan American Games

The men's discus throw event at the 1991 Pan American Games was held in Havana, Cuba on 10 August.

== Results ==
Rank	Name	Nationality	#1	#2	#3	#4	#5	#6	Result	Notes
1st place, gold medalist(s)	Anthony Washington	United States	59.26	63.08	63.84	65.04	x	61.82	65.04	
2nd place, silver medalist(s)	Roberto Moya	Cuba	62.44	61.94	x	63.06	63.92	61.88	63.92	
3rd place, bronze medalist(s)	Juan Martínez Brito	Cuba	61.24	62.96	x	63.52	62.98	x	63.52	
4	Mike Gravelle	United States	x	56.24	x	61.54	x	x	61.54	
5	Robert Venier	Canada	49.80	x	51.32	54.60	x	51.96	54.60	
6	Alex Stanat	Canada	51.66	51.80	x	50.16	52.26	x	52.26	
7	Marcelo Pugliese	Argentina	47.20	x	x	x	x	47.46	47.46	
	Andrés Charadía	Argentina							DNS	
