= Ohrady =

Ohrady Csallóközkürt
- Municipality
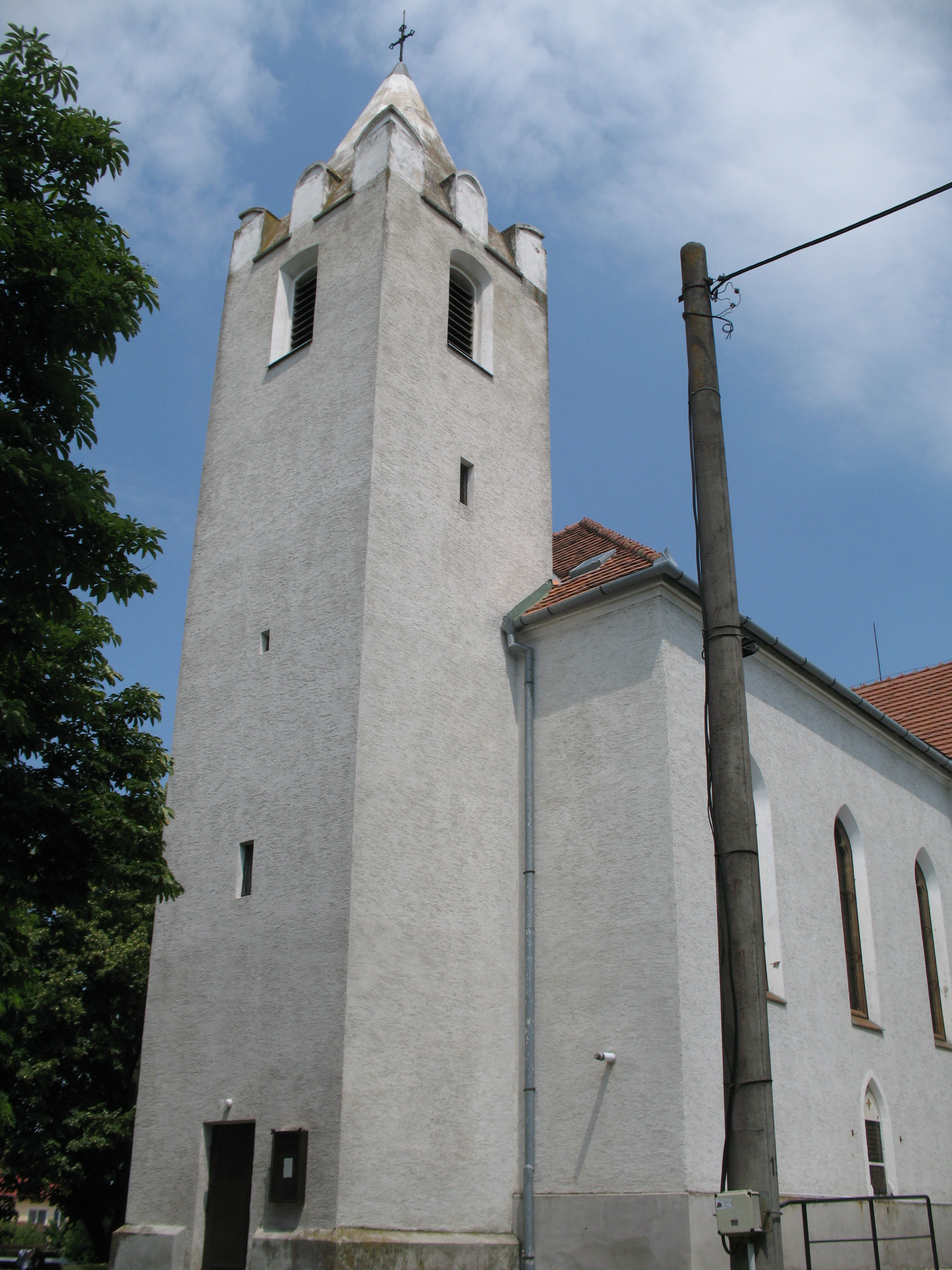
- Church of Saint Stephen

- Flag

- Location of Ohrady in the Trnava Region Location of Ohrady in Slovakia
- Coordinates: 47.98°N 17.70°E
- Country: Slovakia
- Region: Trnava Region
- District: Dunajská Streda District
- First mentioned: 1252

Government
  - Mayor: Anikó Rabay (Ind.)

Area
  - Total: 14.76 km^{2} (5.70 sq mi)
- Elevation: 113 m (371 ft)

Population (2025)
  - Total: 1,353

Ethnicity
  - Hungarians: 95,27%
  - Slovaks: 4,38%
- Time zone: UTC+1 (CET)
  - Summer (DST): UTC+2 (CEST)
- Postal code: 930 12
- Area code: +421 31
- Vehicle registration plate (until 2022): DS
- Website: www.obecohrady.sk

Ohrady (Hungarian: Csallóközkürt, pronounced [ˈtʃɒlloːkøzkyrt]) is a village and municipality in the Dunajská Streda District in the Trnava Region of south-west Slovakia.

== History ==
The village was first recorded in 1138 as Kywrth in 1252 as Kurth and Kyrth which refers to the ancient Hungarian tribe 'Kürt'. Until the end of World War I, it was part of Hungary and fell within the Dunaszerdahely district of Pozsony County. After the Austro-Hungarian army disintegrated in November 1918, Czechoslovak troops occupied the area. After the Treaty of Trianon of 1920, the village became officially part of Czechoslovakia. In November 1938, the First Vienna Award granted the area to Hungary and it was held by Hungary until 1945. After Soviet occupation in 1945, Czechoslovak administration returned and the village became officially part of Czechoslovakia in 1947.

Its original Slovak name was created in 1927 as Kerty, but the village was renamed by the authorities in 1948 to the current official name.

== Population ==
Population statistic (10 years)
Year	1995	2005	2015	2025
Count	1167	1177	1266	1353
Difference		+0.85%	+7.56%	+6.87%

Population statistic
Year	2024	2025
Count	1362	1353
Difference		−0.66%

It has a population of 1353 people (31 December 2025).

=== Ethnicity ===
Census 2021 (1+ %)
Ethnicity	Number	Fraction
Hungarian	1261	92.78%
Slovak	131	9.63%
Not found out	44	3.23%
Total	1359	

In year 2021 was 1359 people by ethnicity 1261 as Hungarian, 131 as Slovak, 44 as Not found out, 5 as Czech, 3 as Ukrainian, 2 as Other, 1 as Jewish, 1 as Russian and 1 as German.

Note on population: The difference values of population numbers in the table "Population statistic" and in the sections "Ethnicity" & "Religion" is caused by the use of various statistical methods.

=== Religion ===
Census 2021 (1+ %)
Religion	Number	Fraction
Roman Catholic Church	1106	81.38%
None	154	11.33%
Calvinist Church	47	3.46%
Evangelical Church	19	1.4%
Not found out	16	1.18%
Total	1359	

In year 2021 was 1359 people by religion 1106 from Roman Catholic Church, 154 from None, 47 from Calvinist Church, 19 from Evangelical Church, 16 from Not found out, 5 from Christian Congregations in Slovakia, 3 from Other and not ascertained christian church, 2 from Jehovah's Witnesses, 2 from Greek Catholic Church, 1 from Eastern Orthodox Church, 1 from Other, 1 from United Methodist Church, 1 from Buddhism and 1 from Ad hoc movements.

In 1910, the village had 903, for the most part, Hungarian inhabitants. At the 2001 Census the recorded population of the village was 1141 while an end-2008 estimate by the Statistical Office had the villages's population as 1181. As of 2001, 95.27% of its population were Hungarians while 4.38% were Slovaks.

Roman Catholicism is the majority religion of the village, its adherents numbering 93.69% of the total population.

== Geography ==
The municipality lies at an altitude of 113 metres (371 ft) and covers an area of 14.76 km^{2} (5.70 sq mi) (2025).

== Notable people ==
- Imrich Bugár, discus thrower
