= Hilmar Hoßfeld =

German discus thrower

Personal information
- Nationality: German
- Born: 18 January 1954 (age 72)

Sport
- Sport: Athletics
- Event: Discus throw
- Club: SC Traktor Schwerin

Hilmar Hoßfeld (born 18 January 1954) is a German athlete. He competed in the men's discus throw at the 1980 Summer Olympics.

At the East German championships, he won silver in 1980 and 1983 and bronze in 1981 and 1982. He represented the club SC Traktor Schwerin.
