= Athletics at the 1970 Summer Universiade – Men's discus throw =

The men's discus throw event at the 1970 Summer Universiade was held at the Stadio Comunale in Turin on 5 and 6 September 1970.

== Medalists ==
Gold	Silver	Bronze
János Murányi; Hungary	Hein-Direck Neu; West Germany	Silvano Simeon; Italy

== Results ==
=== Qualification ===
Rank	Heat	Athlete	Nationality	Result	Notes
1	?	János Murányi	Hungary	56.20	
?	?	Hein-Direck Neu	West Germany	55.76	
?	?	Nikolaos Tsiaras	Greece	54.22	
?	?	Silvano Simeon	Italy	53.10	
?	?	János Faragó	Hungary	52.80	
?	?	Armando De Vicentis	Italy	52.58	
?	?	Julián Morrinson	Cuba	51.78	
?	?	Fred DeBernardi	United States	51.78	
?	?	Bill Tancred	Great Britain	51.18	
?	?	Khristos Kambitsis	Greece	51.14	
?	?	Michel Chabrier	France	49.34	
13	?	Bertrand De Decker	Belgium	47.56	
14	?	Sergio Thome	Brazil	46.82	
15	?	Dave Murphy	United States	46.12	
16	?	Ahmed Bendifallah	Algeria	43.06	

=== Final ===
Rank	Name	Nationality	Result	Notes
1st place, gold medalist(s)	János Murányi	Hungary	60.16	
2nd place, silver medalist(s)	Hein-Direck Neu	West Germany	58.62	
3rd place, bronze medalist(s)	Silvano Simeon	Italy	58.22	
4	János Faragó	Hungary	55.38	
5	Armando De Vicentis	Italy	51.92	
6	Fred DeBernardi	United States	51.78	
7	Reinhard Vogt	West Germany	51.70	
8	Nikolaos Tsiaras	Greece	50.64	
9	Bill Tancred	Great Britain	50.22	
10	Khristos Kambitsis	Greece	49.36	
11	Michel Chabrier	France	48.94	
12	Julián Morrinson	Cuba	48.80	
