= Sérgio Thomé =

Personal information
- Full name: Sérgio Antônio Thomé
- Born: 31 October 1948 (age 76)

Sport
- Sport: Athletics
- Event: Discus throw

Sérgio Antônio Thomé (born 31 October 1948) is a retired Brazilian athlete who specialised in the discus throw. He won four gold medals at the South American Championships. He also represented his country at the 1971 Pan American Games.

His personal best in the discus throw is 55.02 metres set in Belo Horizonte in 1971.

== International competitions ==
Year	Competition	Venue	Position	Event	Notes
Representing Brazil
1970	Universiade	Turin, Italy	14th (q)	Discus throw	46.82 m
1971	Pan American Games	Cali, Colombia	5th	Discus throw	54.40 m
1971	South American Championships	Lima, Peru	1st	Discus throw	53.82 m
1975	South American Championships	Rio de Janeiro, Brazil	1st	Discus throw	50.84 m
1977	South American Championships	Montevideo, Uruguay	1st	Discus throw	52.24 m
1979	South American Championships	Bucaramanga, Colombia	1st	Discus throw (1.75 kg)	56.10 m
