= Wolfgang Warnemünde =

East German discus thrower

Personal information
- Born: 8 May 1953 (age 73) Grevesmühlen, Mecklenburg-Vorpommern, East Germany
- Height: 2.02 m (6 ft 8 in)
- Weight: 117 kg (258 lb)

Sport
- Country: East Germany
- Sport: Athletics
- Event: Discus
- Club: SC Empor Rostock

Achievements and titles
- Personal best: 67.56 m (1980)
Medal record
Men's Athletics
Representing East Germany
European Championships
Bronze medal – third place	1982 Athens	Discus
Universiade
Silver medal – second place	1981 Bucharest	Hammer throw
Bronze medal – third place	1977 Sofia	Shot put
Bronze medal – third place	1977 Sofia	Discus throw

Wolfgang Warnemünde (born 8 May 1953 in Grevesmühlen) is a retired East German discus thrower.

He finished eighth at the 1978 European Athletics Championships and won the bronze medal at the 1982 European Athletics Championships.

He represented the sports team SC Empor Rostock. He never became East German champion, but won silver medals at the national championships in 1977, 1978, 1982 and 1984.

His personal best throw was 67.56 metres, achieved in June 1980 in Rostock. This result ranks him ninth among German discus throwers, behind Jürgen Schult, Lars Riedel, Wolfgang Schmidt, Armin Lemme, Hein-Direck Neu, Alwin Wagner, Michael Möllenbeck and Rolf Danneberg.
