= Bradley Cooper (athlete) =

Bahamian discus thrower and shot putter

Personal information
- Nationality: Bahamian
- Born: June 30, 1957 (age 69) The Bahamas
- Education: Florida State University
- Occupations: Manager, Wellness Centre at The College of The Bahamas
- Height: 188 cm (6 ft 2 in)
- Weight: 132 kg (291 lb)

Sport
- Sport: Athletics
- Event: Hammer throw
Medal record
Men's athletics
Representing Bahamas
CARIFTA Games Junior (U20)
Silver medal – second place	1975 Hamilton	Discus Throw
Gold medal – first place	1976 Nassau	Shot Put
Gold medal – first place	1976 Nassau	Discus Throw

Tyrone Bradley Thomas Cooper (born June 30, 1957) is a retired male discus thrower and shot putter from the Bahamas. He competed for his native country in two consecutive Summer Olympics, starting in 1984. Cooper set his personal best, 67.10 metres (220.1 ft), in the discus event on June 14, 1986, in Nassau.

Cooper was the flag bearer for the Bahamas in the Los Angeles 1984 opening ceremony.

Cooper won the British AAA Championships title at the 1982 AAA Championships.

== Competition record ==
Year	Competition	Venue	Position	Event	Notes
Representing the Bahamas
1975	CARIFTA Games (U20)	Hamilton, Bermuda	2nd	Discus throw	47.12 m
1976	CARIFTA Games (U20)	Nassau, Bahamas	1st	Shot put	15.71 m
1976	CARIFTA Games (U20)	Nassau, Bahamas	1st	Discus throw	53.62 m
1977	Central American and Caribbean Championships	Xalapa, Mexico	3rd	Discus throw	54.08 m
1978	Central American and Caribbean Games	Medellín, Colombia	7th	Shot put	15.32 m
1978	Central American and Caribbean Games	Medellín, Colombia	3rd	Discus throw	54.24 m
1978	Commonwealth Games	Edmonton, Canada	12th	Shot put	14.92 m
1978	Commonwealth Games	Edmonton, Canada	2nd	Discus throw	57.30 m
1979	Central American and Caribbean Championships	Guadalajara, Mexico	2nd	Shot put	18.35 m
1979	Central American and Caribbean Championships	Guadalajara, Mexico	2nd	Discus throw	61.24 m
1979	Pan American Games	San Juan, Puerto Rico	2nd	Discus throw	62.16 m
1980	Liberty Bell Classic	Philadelphia, United States	5th	Discus throw	58.32 m
1981	Central American and Caribbean Championships	Santo Domingo, Dominican Republic	2nd	Discus throw	62.32 m
1982	Central American and Caribbean Games	Havana, Cuba	5th	Shot put	15.91 m
1982	Central American and Caribbean Games	Havana, Cuba	2nd	Discus throw	66.72 m
1982	Commonwealth Games	Brisbane, Australia	1st	Discus throw	64.04 m
1983	Central American and Caribbean Championships	Havana, Cuba	1st	Discus throw	63.26 m
1983	World Championships	Helsinki, Finland	12th	Discus throw	58.70 m
1983	Pan American Games	Caracas, Venezuela	2nd	Discus throw	62.38 m
1984	Olympic Games	Los Angeles, United States	16th (q)	Discus throw	53.70 m
1985	Central American and Caribbean Championships	Santiago, Dominican Republic	3rd	Discus throw	60.10 m
1986	Central American and Caribbean Games	Santiago, Dominican Republic	2nd	Discus throw	64.56 m
1987	Pan American Games	Indianapolis, United States	2nd	Discus throw	64.56 m
1987	World Championships	Rome, Italy	10th	Discus throw	61.94 m
1988	Olympic Games	Seoul, South Korea	16th (q)	Discus throw	59.74 m
1990	Commonwealth Games	Auckland, New Zealand	4th	Discus throw	58.98 m
1994	Commonwealth Games	Victoria, Canada	6th	Discus throw	60.46 m

== Sources ==
- 1984 Year Ranking
