= Paul Nandapi =

Australian discus thrower

Personal information
- Nationality: Australian
- Born: 21 December 1961 (age 63)

Sport
- Sport: Athletics
- Event: Discus throw

Paul Nandapi (born 21 December 1961) is a retired Australian discus thrower.

He finished sixth at the 1985 World Cup, won the bronze medal at the 1985 Pacific Conference Games, the silver medal at the 1986 Commonwealth Games, finished fifth at the 1989 World Cup and won the bronze medal at the 1990 Commonwealth Games.

Nandapi became Australian champion in the years 1983–1987. His personal best throw was 62.66 metres, achieved in December 1987 in Canberra.

Nandapi finished third behind Bob Weir in the discus throw event at the british 1984 AAA Championships.
