= Piet Goosen =

South African rugby union player

- Full name: Cornelius Petrus Goosen
- Born: 3 February 1937 Bloemfontein, South Africa
- Died: 7 June 1991 (aged 54)
- Height: 1.94 m (6 ft 4 in)
- Weight: 104.3 kg (230 lb)

Rugby union career
- Position: Lock
Provincial / State sides
Years	Team	Apps	(Points)
- Orange Free State
International career
Years	Team	Apps	(Points)
1965	South Africa	1	(0)

Cornelius Petrus Goosen (3 February 1937 – 7 June 1991) was a South African international rugby union player.

Goosen was born in Bloemfontein and educated at Hoërskool Sentraal.

A lock forward, Goosen represented Orange Free State in provincial rugby. He was a member of the Springboks squad on their 1965 tour of Australia and New Zealand. After the Springboks lost the opening Test match in New Zealand, Goosen replaced Tiny Naudé in the XV to play the All Blacks at Carisbrook, to gain his first cap at age 29. He was employed as a department store personnel manager at the time of his Springboks career.

== See also ==
- List of South Africa national rugby union players
