= Najem Najem =

Kuwaiti discus thrower

Personal information
- Nationality: Kuwaiti
- Born: 30 November 1961 (age 64)
- Height: 1.50 m (4 ft 11 in)
- Weight: 60 kg (130 lb)

Sport
- Sport: Athletics
- Event: Discus throw
Medal record
Men's athletics
Representing Kuwait
Asian Championships
Bronze medal – third place	1983 Kuwait City	Discus throw

Najem Abdelrazak Al-Enazy Najem (Arabic: نجم عبدالرازق العنزي; born 30 November 1961) is a Kuwaiti discus thrower. He competed in the 1980 Summer Olympics and won a bronze medal at the 1983 Asian Athletics Championships.

== Career ==
Abdelrazak threw 39.26 metres to finish 17th in qualification. He fouled his first throw, threw his best mark on his second attempt, and threw 35.38 m on his final throw.

At the 1983 Asian Athletics Championships in Kuwait City, Abdelrazak won the bronze medal in the discus, throwing 51.00 metres. He also set a personal best throw of 52.68 m that year.

Abdelrazak also competed in the 1985 World University Games, where he threw 45.90 metres to place 13th in the finals.
