= 1986 European Athletics Championships – Men's discus throw =

Men's discus throw at the European Athletics Championships

These are the official results of the Men's discus throw event at the 1986 European Championships in Stuttgart, West Germany, held at Neckarstadion on 30 and 31 August 1986.

== Medalists ==
Gold	Romas Ubartas; Soviet Union
Silver	Georgiy Kolnootchenko; Soviet Union
Bronze	Vaclovas Kidykas; Soviet Union

== Results ==
=== Final ===
31 August

Rank	Name	Nationality	Result	Notes
1st place, gold medalist(s)	Romas Ubartas	Soviet Union	67.08	
2nd place, silver medalist(s)	Georgiy Kolnootchenko	Soviet Union	67.02	
3rd place, bronze medalist(s)	Vaclovas Kidykas	Soviet Union	66.32	
4	Knut Hjeltnes	Norway	65.60	
5	Géjza Valent	Czechoslovakia	65.00	
6	Erik de Bruin	Netherlands	64.52	
7	Jürgen Schult	East Germany	64.38	
8	Imrich Bugár	Czechoslovakia	63.56	
9	Alwin Wagner	West Germany	62.76	
10	Stefan Fernholm	Sweden	62.24	
11	Rolf Danneberg	West Germany	61.60	
12	Alois Hannecker	West Germany	59.48	

=== Qualification ===
30 August

Rank	Name	Nationality	Result	Notes
1	Georgiy Kolnootchenko	Soviet Union	66.08	Q
2	Imrich Bugár	Czechoslovakia	65.62	Q
3	Knut Hjeltnes	Norway	64.36	Q
4	Romas Ubartas	Soviet Union	64.08	Q
5	Stefan Fernholm	Sweden	62.98	Q
6	Erik de Bruin	Netherlands	62.96	Q
7	Vaclovas Kidykas	Soviet Union	62.76	Q
8	Rolf Danneberg	West Germany	62.32	Q
9	Jürgen Schult	East Germany	61.06	Q
10	Alois Hannecker	West Germany	60.98	Q
11	Géjza Valent	Czechoslovakia	60.58	Q
12	Alwin Wagner	West Germany	60.38	Q
13	Marco Martino	Italy	59.94	
14	Kamen Dimitrov	Bulgaria	59.88	
15	Dariusz Juzyszyn	Poland	59.82	
16	Paul Mardle	United Kingdom	58.08	
17	Olav Jenssen	Norway	56.96	
18	Konstantinos Georgakopoulos	Greece	56.70	
19	Graham Savory	United Kingdom	55.96	
20	Georg Andersen	Norway	55.24	
21	Bo Henriksson	Sweden	54.24	

== Participation ==
According to an unofficial count, 21 athletes from 12 countries participated in the event.

- Bulgaria (1)
- Czechoslovakia (2)
- East Germany (1)
- Greece (1)
- Italy (1)
- Netherlands (1)
- Norway (3)
- Poland (1)
- Soviet Union (3)
- Sweden (2)
- United Kingdom (2)
- West Germany (3)

== See also ==
- 1983 Men's World Championships Discus Throw (Helsinki)
- 1987 Men's World Championships Discus Throw (Rome)
- 1988 Men's Olympic Discus Throw (Seoul)
