= Werner Reiterer =

Austrian-born Australian discus thrower and shot putter

Personal information
- Nationality: Austrian/Australian
- Born: 27 January 1968 (age 58) Hohenems, Vorarlberg, Austria
- Height: 193 cm (6 ft 4 in)
- Weight: 112 kg (247 lb)

Sport
- Sport: Athletics
- Event: Discus throw
- Club: Ringwood AC
Medal record
Men's athletics
Representing Australia
Commonwealth Games
Gold medal – first place	1994 Victoria	Discus throw
Silver medal – second place	1990 Auckland	Discus throw
Bronze medal – third place	1986 Edinburgh	Discus throw

Werner Josef Reiterer (born 27 January 1968) is an Austrian-born retired discus thrower and shot putter from Australia, who represented the latter at two consecutive Summer Olympics, starting in 1988 (Seoul, South Korea). His best result was winning the title in the men's discus throw at the 1994 Commonwealth Games in Victoria, British Columbia, Canada. Reiterer is an eight-time national champion in the discus throw.

Reiterer won the British AAA Championships title at the 1991 AAA Championships and 1992 AAA Championships.

In his book 'Positive' he admitted to five years of performance-enhancing drug use, but claimed he only used them later in his career.

== Achievements ==
- All results concerning discus throw

Year	Competition	Venue	Position	Notes
Representing Australia
1985	Pacific Conference Games	Berkeley, United States	6th	50.46 m
1986	Commonwealth Games	Edinburgh, Scotland	3rd	57.34 m
1986	World Junior Championships	Athens, Greece	2nd	58.64 m
1988	Olympic Games	Seoul, South Korea	15th	59.78 m
1990	Commonwealth Games	Auckland, New Zealand	2nd	61.56 m
1991	World Championships	Tokyo, Japan	17th	60.40 m
1992	Olympic Games	Barcelona, Spain	10th	60.12 m
1994	Commonwealth Games	Victoria, Canada	1st	62.76 m
1995	World Championships	Gothenburg, Sweden	30th	57.60 m
