= Juan Martínez Brito =

Cuban discus thrower (born 1958)

Personal information
- Born: May 17, 1958 (age 68) Guanabacoa, Havana, Cuba
- Occupation: Discus thrower
- Height: 6 ft 1 in (1.85 m)
- Weight: 269 lb (122 kg)
Medal record
Men's athletics
Representing Cuba
Pan American Games
Bronze medal – third place	1983 Caracas	Discus throw
Bronze medal – third place	1991 Havana	Discus throw
Central American and Caribbean Games
Silver medal – second place	1986 Santiago	Discus throw
Bronze medal – third place	1982 Havana	Discus throw
Summer Universiade
Bronze medal – third place	1985 Kobe	Discus throw

Juan Martínez Brito (born May 17, 1958) is a retired discus thrower from Cuba, who represented his native country at the 1992 Summer Olympics. His personal best is 70.00 m (229 ft 7 3/4 in), thrown on May 21, 1983, in Havana.

He won the British AAA Championships title in the discus throw event at the 1985 AAA Championships.

== International competitions ==
Year	Competition	Venue	Position	Event	Notes
Representing Cuba
1976	Central American and Caribbean; Junior Championships (U-20)	Xalapa, Mexico	1st	Shot put	15.98m A
1976	Central American and Caribbean; Junior Championships (U-20)	Xalapa, Mexico	1st	Discus throw	53.98m A
1982	Central American and Caribbean Games	Havana, Cuba	3rd	Discus throw	62.82 m
1983	World Championships	Helsinki, Finland	7th	Discus throw	64.26 m
1983	Pan American Games	Caracas, Venezuela	3rd	Discus throw	62.04 m
1984	Friendship Games	Moscow, Soviet Union	2nd	Discus throw	66.04 m
1985	Universiade	Kobe, Japan	3rd	Discus throw	63.02 m
1986	Central American and Caribbean Games	Santiago de los Caballeros, Dominican Republic	2nd	Discus throw	62.30 m
1987	Pan American Games	Indianapolis, United States	4th	Discus throw	62.56 m
1988	Ibero-American Championships	Mexico City, Mexico	2nd	Discus throw	63.72 m A
1991	Pan American Games	Havana, Cuba	3rd	Discus throw	63.52 m
1991	World Championships	Tokyo, Japan	23rd (q)	Discus throw	59.98 m
1992	Ibero-American Championships	Seville, Spain	1st	Discus throw	63.02 m
1992	Olympic Games	Barcelona, Spain	6th	Discus throw	62.64 m
