= Romas Ubartas =

Lithuanian discus thrower (born 1960)

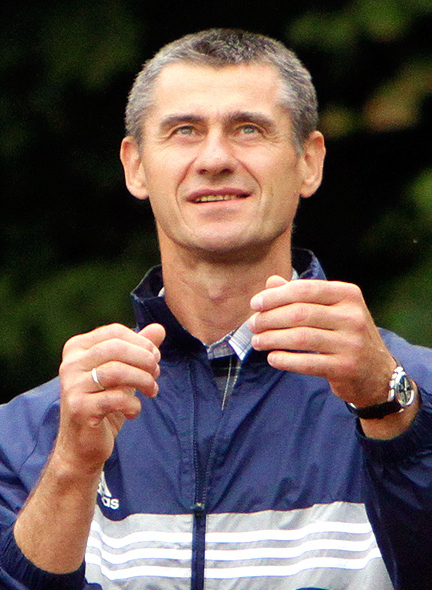
- Ubartas in 2011

Personal information
- Nationality: Lithuanian
- Born: 26 May 1960 (age 66) Panevėžys, Lithuanian SSR, Soviet Union
- Height: 2.03 m (6 ft 8 in)
- Weight: 120 kg (265 lb)

Sport
- Country: Soviet Union; Lithuania
- Sport: Athletics
- Event: Discus throw

Achievements and titles
- Personal best: 70.06 m (1988)
Medal record
Men's Athletics
Representing Soviet Union
Olympic Games
Silver medal – second place	1988 Seoul	Discus
European Championships
Gold medal – first place	1986 Stuttgart	Discus
Representing Lithuania
Olympic Games
Gold medal – first place	1992 Barcelona	Discus

Romas Ubartas (born 26 May 1960 in Panevėžys) is a retired male discus thrower from Lithuania who won a silver medal at the 1988 Summer Olympics for the USSR and a gold medal at the 1992 Summer Olympics for Lithuania, the nation's first gold. His personal best was 70.06m. He also became European champion, in 1986. When Lithuania was part of the Soviet Union, he trained at Dynamo in Vilnius. In 1993, after finishing fourth at the World Track and Field Championships in Germany, Ubartas failed a doping test and was disqualified for four years.

== Achievements ==
Year	Competition	Venue	Position	Event	Notes
Representing Soviet Union
1986	European Championships	Stuttgart, West Germany	1st	Discus	67.08 m
1987	World Championships	Rome, Italy	6th	Discus	65.50 m
1988	Olympic Games	Seoul, South Korea	2nd	Discus	67.48 m
1990	Goodwill Games	Seattle, United States	1st	Discus	67.14 m
Representing Lithuania
1992	Olympic Games	Barcelona, Spain	1st	Discus	65.12 m
1998	European Championships	Budapest, Hungary	9th	Discus	61.66 m
2001	World Championships	Edmonton, Canada	14th	Discus	61.49 m
2002	Lithuanian Championships	Kaunas, Lithuania	2nd	Discus	52.60 m

== See also ==
- List of sportspeople sanctioned for doping offences
