= Art Burns =

American discus thrower (born 1954)

Personal information
- Nationality: American
- Born: July 19, 1954 (age 71) Washington DC, United States

Sport
- Sport: Athletics
- Event: Discus throw

Arthur Leon Burns (born July 19, 1954) is an American retired discus thrower. He finished in fifth place (64.98 metres) at the 1984 Summer Olympics, just behind his medal winning compatriots Mac Wilkins (silver) and John Powell (bronze).

Burns was an All-American thrower for the Colorado Buffaloes track and field team, finishing 5th in the discus at the 1977 NCAA Division I Outdoor Track and Field Championships. He lived near San Jose City College and worked for Memorex part-time while competing.

Burns finished third behind fellow Americans John Powell and Al Oerter in the discus throw event at the British 1981 AAA Championships.

== Achievements ==
Year	Competition	Venue	Position	Notes
1983	World Championships	Helsinki, Finland	8th	63.22 m
1984	Olympic Games	Los Angeles, United States	5th	64.98 m
