= Knut Hjeltnes (discus thrower) =

Norwegian discus thrower and shot putter (1951–2024)

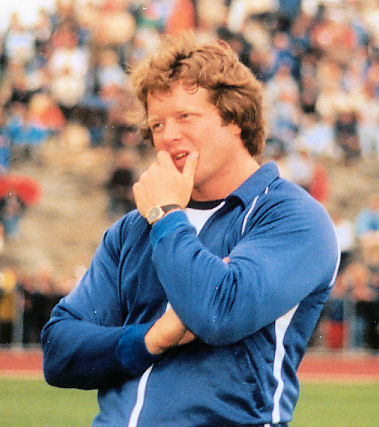
- Hjeltnes between 1981 and 1982

Personal information
- Nationality: Norwegian
- Born: 8 December 1951 Ulvik Municipality, Norway
- Died: 17 January 2024 (aged 72)
- Height: 1.92 m (6 ft 4 in)
- Weight: 115 kg (254 lb; 18.1 st)

Sport
- Sport: Track and field
- Event(s): Discus and shot put
- College team: Western Maryland, Penn State
- Club: Gular IL
- Turned pro: 1975
- Retired: 1990

Achievements and titles
- Personal bests: Discus: 69.62 m (1985) NR; Shot put: 20.55 m (1980)

Knut Hjeltnes (8 December 1951 – 17 January 2024) was a Norwegian college coach and track and field athlete.

== Biography ==
Hjeltnes, who was born in Ulvik Municipality, won 20 Norwegian national championships: 11 in discus throw, in 1975, 1976, 1978, 1980–84, 1986, 1988, and 1989; and 9 in shot put, in 1975–1978 and 1980–1984.

Hjeltnes was ranked 2nd through 7th in the world in the discus for twelve years from 1976 to 1988. He still holds the Norwegian national record in discus with 69.62 meters (228 feet, 5 inches), achieved in 1985. He also had a personal best shot put of 20.55 meters (67 feet, 5 inches), achieved in 1980.

Hjeltnes was a four-time Olympian in the discus (1976, 1980-boycott, 1984, 1988). His best Olympic placings were 4th place in 1984 and 7th place in 1976 and 1988. He narrowly missed the podium in 1984, throwing only 18 cm short of John Powell's bronze medal throw. His best World Championship placing was 9th in 1983. His best European Championship placing was 4th in 1986.

Hjeltnes attended Western Maryland College (now McDaniel College), Penn State University, and Brigham Young University. He earned multiple All-American accolades in shot put and discus while attending Western Maryland and Penn State. While attending BYU, he was coached by Jay Silvester, an American discus legend and former world record holder.

Hjeltnes is still ranked #36 on the world all-time list for discus. As a masters-level athlete, he has an all-time world ranking of 8th in the men's 35-39 age class.

Hjeltnes coached at the NCAA Division I level for about 20 years, producing a number of All-Americans and conference champions. Hjeltnes coached athletes at the United States Military Academy at West Point, NY from 1999 until 2013. While coaching at USMA West Point, his athletes produced 40 Patriot League Championships, 3 NCAA All-Americans, 30 NCAA Regional Qualifiers, and 2 Academic All-Americans. Hjeltnes was hired as the throws coach at Auburn University in 2013. He retired from full-time coaching at the end of the 2016 outdoor season.

Hjeltnes tested positive for anabolic steroids at Oslo's Bislett Stadium on 6 July 1977, and at the European Cup in Helsinki in August 1977, and was suspended "indefinitely." The suspension was reduced to one year on appeal, allowing him to participate in the 1978 European Championships. He continued to compete internationally for another 10 years and was doping-tested at all national and international competitions more than 100 times throughout his career. He was the first Norwegian ever to test positive. Hjeltnes publicly admitted to doping and claimed that almost everybody at the Olympic level used some form of doping during the 1970s. Knut also cooperated with Jan Hedenstad to write a book, called Dopet ("Doped"), published in 1979 (ISBN 8205120021).

Hjeltnes died on 17 January 2024, at the age of 72.

== Achievements ==
Year	Competition	Venue	Position	Event	Notes
Representing Norway
1988	Olympic Games	Seoul, South Korea	7th	Discus	64.94 m
1984	Olympic Games	Los Angeles, California	4th	Discus	65.28 m
1976	Olympic Games	Montreal, Canada	7th	Discus	63.06 m
1986	European Athletics Championships	Stuttgart, West Germany	4th	Discus	65.60 m
1983	World Championships	Helsinki, Finland	9th	Discus	62.26 m

== See also ==
- List of Pennsylvania State University Olympians
