= Ari Huumonen =

Finnish discus thrower

Ari Huumonen (March 5, 1956 – May 20, 2013) was a discus thrower from Finland, best known for finishing in fourth place at the inaugural 1983 World Championships. He won the Finnish national championship in the discus three times (1983, 1985 and 1987).
