= Nikolay Vikhor =

Soviet discus thrower (born 1954)

Personal information
- Born: March 10, 1954 (age 72) Moscow, Soviet Union

Sport
- Sport: Track and field
Medal record
Representing Soviet Union
Summer Universiade
Gold medal – first place	1977 Sofia	Discus throw

Nikolay Vikhor (Russian: Николай Вихор; born March 10, 1954) is a retired male discus thrower. He represented the Soviet Union at the 1976 Summer Olympics in Montreal, where he ended up in 21st place in the overall-rankings. Vikhor is best known for winning the gold medal in the men's discus event at the 1977 Summer Universiade in Sofia, Bulgaria.
