= Kenth Gardenkrans =

Swedish discus thrower (born 1955)

Kenth Roland Gardenkrans (born October 2, 1955, in Helsingborg, Skåne, Sweden) is a Swedish discus thrower. He represented Sweden at the 1980 Olympics. He competed for Mölndal AIK . Gardenkrans won the 1980 and 81 Swedish championship in discus. While at Brigham Young University he won the 1978 NCAA Championships and was an All American.

In 1974 he set the World Junior Record, twice, ending up with 62.04. He finished second at the 1973 European Athletics Junior Championships behind future world record holder Wolfgang Schmidt. Knee injuries curtailed his later career.

In 2011, he was hired as the throwing coach for Qatar. But he soon packed his bags and returned to Sweden when he learned he was expected to train Ahmed Mohammed Dheeb who was already on a 2-year doping suspension.

His youngest son Jakob Gardenkrans improved Kenths previous world record to 62.58m 2016. His other son Viktor Gardenkrans was also a top Swedish thrower, participating in the 2012 World Junior Championships.
