= Dmitry Kovtsun =

Ukrainian discus thrower

Personal information
- Born: September 29, 1955 (age 70) Ternopil, Ukrainian SSR, Soviet Union

Sport
- Sport: Track and field
Medal record
Representing Soviet Union
Goodwill Games
| Silver medal – second place | 1986 Moscow | Discus throw |

Dmitriy Kovtsun (Ukrainian: Дмитро Ҝовҵун; born September 29, 1955) is a former discus thrower from Ukraine, who represented the Unified Team at the 1992 Summer Olympics in Barcelona, Spain. There he finished in seventh place.
