= Georgiy Kolnootchenko =

Belarusian discus thrower

Personal information
- Born: 7 May 1959 (age 67)

Sport
- Sport: Track and field
Medal record
Representing Soviet Union
European Championships
Silver medal – second place	1986 Stuttgart	Discus throw

Georgiy Vasilyevich Kolnootchenko (Belarusian: Георгі Васілевіч Кальнаотчанка, Russian: Георий Васильеич Колноотченко; born 7 May 1959) is a retired discus thrower from Belarus, who still is the national record holder with a distance of 69.44, thrown on 3 July 1982 in Indianapolis, United States. He won the silver medal in the men's discus event at the 1986 European Championships in Stuttgart, West Germany.

== Achievements ==
Year	Competition	Venue	Position	Notes
Representing Soviet Union
1982	European Championships	Athens, Greece	5th	62.82 m
1983	World Championships	Helsinki, Finland	6th	64.74 m
1986	European Championships	Stuttgart, West Germany	2nd	67.02 m
