= Göran Svensson =

Swedish discus thrower

Personal information
- Born: 8 March 1959
- Died: 6 October 1995 (aged 36)

Sport
- Sport: Track and field

Sven Göran Svensson (8 March 1959 – 6 October 1995) was a Swedish discus thrower. He represented Sweden at the 1987 World Championships in Athletics. As a senior, he competed for Söderhamns IF, IF Göta and IF Elfsborg. He won national championships in 1982 and also took a total of four Swedish championship silver medals. In 1985 he was suspended 18 months for doping. At the age of 30, Svensson was "clean" of anabolic steroids. While competing for Brigham Young University, he was the 1980 NCAA Champion. After studies in the U.S., he settled there and became a U.S. citizen in 1988. Svensson was the coach of Swedish discus thrower Stefan Fernholm during the 1995 World Championships in Athletics in Gothenburg.

Svensson died in 1995, survived by five children. He is buried in Sweden.
