= Ihor Duhinets =

Soviet-Ukrainian discus thrower

Personal information
- Full name: Ihor Oleksiyovych Duhinets
- Born: May 20, 1956 (age 70) Kuibysheve, Bakhchysarai Raion, Crimea

Sport
- Event: Discus throw
Medal record
Men's athletics
Representing Soviet Union
European Championships
Silver medal – second place	1982 Athens	Discus throw

Ihor Oleksiyovych Duhinets (Ukrainian: Ігор Олексійович Дугінец, Russian: Игорь Алексеевич Дугинец, Igor Alekseyevich Duginets; born May 20, 1956, in Kuibysheve, Crimean) is a retired male Soviet-Ukrainian discus thrower.

He set his personal best on August 21, 1982, at a meet in Kiev, throwing 68.52. He won the silver medal at the 1982 European Championships in Athletics in Athens, Greece.
