= Imrich Bugár =

Czechoslovak discus thrower (1955–2026)

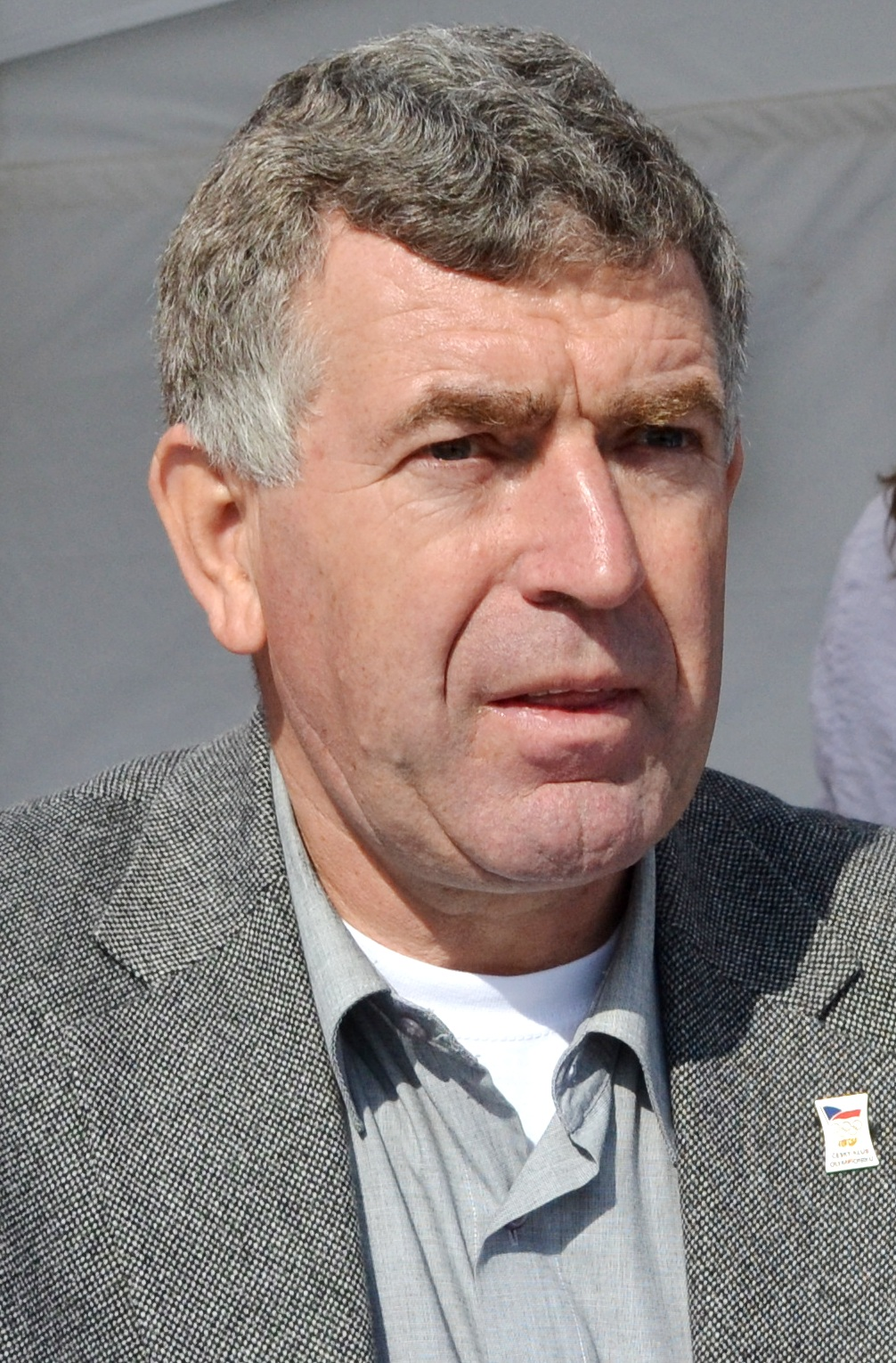
- Bugár in 2013

Personal information
- Nationality: Czech
- Born: 14 April 1955 Ohrady, Czechoslovakia
- Died: 8 April 2026 (aged 70)
- Height: 1.96 m (6 ft 5 in)
- Weight: 120 kg (265 lb)

Sport
- Country: Czechoslovakia
- Sport: Athletics
- Event: Discus throw

Achievements and titles
- Personal best: 71.26 m (1985)
Medal record
Men's athletics
Representing Czechoslovakia
Olympic Games
Silver medal – second place	1980 Moscow	Discus
World Championships
Gold medal – first place	1983 Helsinki	Discus
European Championships
Gold medal – first place	1982 Athens	Discus
Bronze medal – third place	1978 Prague	Discus

Imrich Bugár (Hungarian: Bugár Imre; 14 April 1955 – 8 April 2026) was a Czech discus thrower of Slovak-Hungarian origin. He represented Czechoslovakia and then the Czech Republic. His career highlights include an Olympic silver medal from 1980, a European Championship title from 1982, and a gold medal in the inaugural World Championships in 1983. His personal best throw of 71.26 metres places him tenth on the all-time performers list.

== Life and career ==
Imrich Bugár was born on 14 April 1955 in Ohrady near Dunajská Streda, Czechoslovakia (present-day Slovakia). He first represented the club Inter Bratislava, but soon moved to Prague. He represented the club Dukla Prague for 21 years and worked for the club for another 30 years, until his retirement in the summer of 2025.

He was very successful in his early career with a bronze medal at the 1978 European Championships in Czechoslovakia, the silver medal at the 1980 Olympic Games, the third place at the 1981 World Cup, the gold medal at the 1982 European Championships, and the gold medal at the 1983 World Championships. In 1982 he was awarded as the Sportsperson of the Year in Czechoslovakia.

Bugár finished fourth at the 1986 Goodwill Games, eighth at the 1986 European Championships, seventh at the 1987 World Championships, twelfth at the 1988 Olympic Games, and seventh at the 1990 European Championships. He then competed at the 1991 and 1993 World Championships, the 1992 Olympic Games, and the 1994 European Championships without reaching the final. He became Czechoslovak champion in 1978, 1979, 1980, 1981, 1982, 1983, 1984, 1985, 1986, 1988, 1990, 1991, and 1992, and Czech champion in 1993 and 1994.

His personal best throw was 71.26 metres, achieved in May 1985 in San Jose, California. This is the Czech record, and puts him into the top 20 all-time performers list.

Bugár died on 8 April 2026, at the age of 70.

Awards
Preceded by Jarmila Kratochvílová	Sportsperson of the Year in Czechoslovakia; 1982	Succeeded by Jarmila Kratochvílová
