= Óskar Jakobsson =

Icelandic athletics competitor

Personal information
- Nationality: Icelandic
- Born: 29 January 1955 (age 71) Reykjavík, Iceland

Sport
- Sport: Athletics
- Event: Shot put

Óskar Jakobsson (born 29 January 1955) is an Icelandic athlete. He competed at the 1976 Summer Olympics and the 1980 Summer Olympics.

Jakobsson competed for the Texas Longhorns track and field team in the NCAA.
