= Alwin Wagner =

West German discus thrower and weightlifter

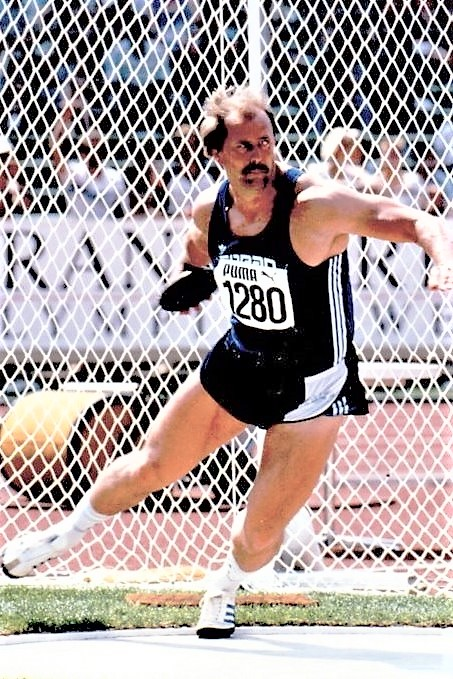
Alwin Josef Wagner in 1985

Alwin Josef Wagner (born 11 August 1950 in Melsungen, Hessen) is a West German discus thrower and weight lifter, who was affiliated with University Sportclub Mainz (USC Mainz).

He finished sixth at the 1984 Summer Olympics. In Germany he is also well known for winning five national championships in a row in the years 1981–1985.

His personal best throw was 67.80 metres, achieved in July 1987 in Melsungen. This result ranks him sixth among German discus throwers, behind Jürgen Schult, Lars Riedel, Wolfgang Schmidt, Armin Lemme and Hein-Direck Neu. While competing, he was 1.96 meters tall and weighed 130 kg.

== International competitions ==
Year	Competition	Venue	Position	Notes
Representing West Germany
1980	Olympic Boycott Games	Philadelphia, United States	3rd	59.48 m
1982	European Championships	Athens, Greece	10th	58.10 m
1984	Olympic Games	Los Angeles, United States	6th	64.72 m
1986	European Championships	Stuttgart, West Germany	9th	62.76 m
