= Werner Hartmann (discus thrower) =

German discus thrower

Personal information
- Nationality: German
- Born: 20 April 1959 (age 66)

Sport
- Sport: Athletics
- Event: Discus throw

Werner Hartmann (born 20 April 1959) is a German athlete. He competed in the men's discus throw at the 1984 Summer Olympics.
