= Robert Gray (discus thrower) =

Canadian discus thrower (born 1956)

Personal information
- Nickname: Bob
- Born: 5 October 1956 (age 69) Downsview, Ontario, Canada
- Height: 188 cm (6 ft 2 in)
- Weight: 120 kg (265 lb)

Sport
- Sport: Athletics
- Event: Discus throw

Robert Gray (born 5 October 1956) is a Canadian former athlete. He competed in the men's discus throw at the 1984 Summer Olympics.

Gray was an All-American for the SMU Mustangs track and field team in University Park, Texas, finishing 7th in the discus at the 1979 NCAA Division I Outdoor Track and Field Championships.
