= Erik de Bruin =

Dutch discus thrower and shot putter

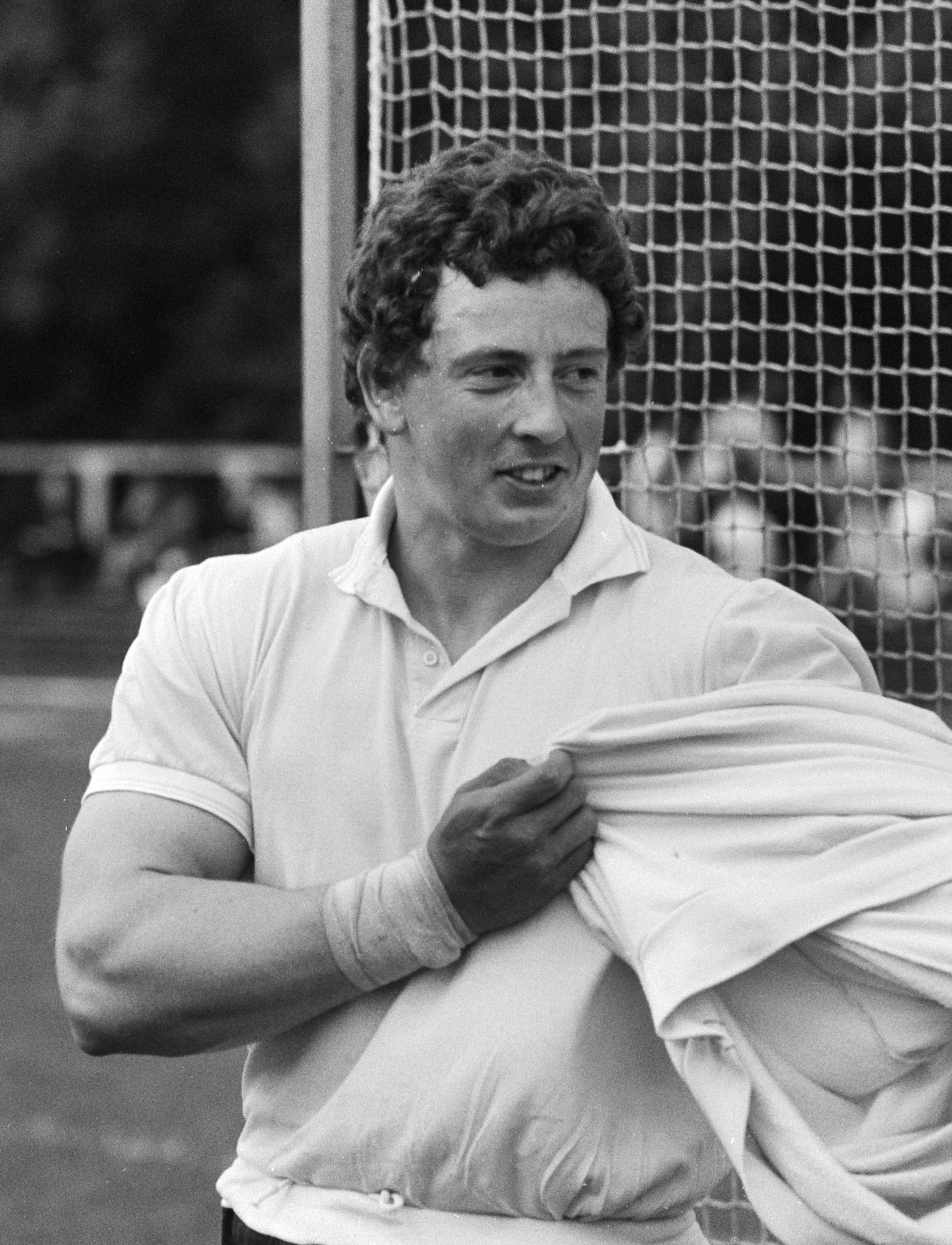
- Erik de Bruin in 1984

Personal information
- Nationality: Dutch
- Born: 25 May 1963 (age 63) Hardinxveld-Giessendam, Netherlands
- Height: 1.86 m (6 ft 1 in)
- Weight: 110 kg (243 lb)
- Spouse: Michelle Smith

Sport
- Sport: Discus throw, shot put
- Club: V&L-TC, Den Haag
Medal record
Men's athletics
Representing the Netherlands
World Championships
Silver medal – second place	1991 Tokyo	Discus throw
European Championships
Silver medal – second place	1990 Split	Discus throw
Summer Universiade
Silver medal – second place	1989 Duisburg	Discus throw

Erik de Bruin (born 25 May 1963 in Hardinxveld-Giessendam, South Holland) is a retired Dutch discus thrower and shot putter. He held the Dutch national record in shot put from 1986 to 2005, and his 68.12 m discus throw record of 1 April 1991 still stands today.

== Athletic career ==
De Bruin was Holland's leading discus thrower and shot putter in the 1980s and early 1990s. He participated in the 1984 and 1988 Summer Olympics, reaching 8th places at the 1984 shot put, and 9th place at the 1988 discus throw event. He was most successful in discus throw, winning silver medals at the 1989 Summer Universiade and 1990 European Championships, and a silver medal at the 1991 World Championships.

De Bruin failed a sports drug test in 1993 but was cleared by the disciplinary committee of the Dutch Athletics Federation (KNAU). The International Association of Athletics Federations did not accept the ruling and banned de Bruin for four years. His wife's later book maintained that finances prevented de Bruin from appealing the conviction and ban fully to prove his innocence.

== Personal life ==
De Bruin married Irish swimmer Michelle Smith in 1996. They live with their two children in Kells, Ireland, where Michelle practices as a barrister. Michelle won four Olympic medals at the 1996 Summer Olympics while being trained by Erik; she was banned from competitive swimming by FINA in 1998.

Erik's younger sister Corrie de Bruin is a former Olympic discus thrower.

== Achievements ==
Year	Competition	Venue	Position	Event	Notes
Representing the Netherlands
1988	Olympic Games	Seoul, South Korea	9th	Discus	63.06 m

1990: European Championship – silver – 64,46 m 1991: World Championship – silver – 65,82 m

Awards
Preceded by Rob Druppers	Herman van Leeuwen Cup; 1984; 1990, 1991	Succeeded by Rob Druppers
Preceded by Emiel Mellaard	Herman van Leeuwen Cup; 1984; 1990, 1991	Succeeded by Robert de Wit
