= Rolf Danneberg =

German discus thrower (born 1953)

Personal information
- Nationality: German
- Born: 1 March 1953 (age 73) Hamburg, West Germany
- Height: 198 cm (6 ft 6 in)
- Weight: 125 kg (276 lb)

Sport
- Country: West Germany
- Sport: Athletics
- Event: Discus throw
- Club: Bayer 04 Leverkusen

Achievements and titles
- Personal best: 67.60 m (1987)
Medal record
Men's Athletics
Representing West Germany
Olympic Games
| Gold medal – first place | 1984 Los Angeles | Discus |
| Bronze medal – third place | 1988 Seoul | Discus |

Rolf Danneberg (born 1 March 1953) is a former German athlete who, representing West Germany, won the gold medal in discus throw at the 1984 Summer Olympics with 66.60 metres. He won the Olympic bronze medal in 1988 in Seoul.

== Biography ==
In addition he finished eleventh at the 1986 European Championships, fourth at the 1987 World Championships and sixth at the 1990 European Championships.

His personal best throw was 67.60 metres, achieved in May 1987 in Berlin. This result ranks him eighth among German discus throwers, behind Jürgen Schult, Lars Riedel, Wolfgang Schmidt, Armin Lemme, Hein-Direck Neu, Alwin Wagner and Michael Möllenbeck. He is a three-time national champion for West Germany in the discus throw.

He currently works as a trainer, coaching Markus Münch for the 2009 World Championships in Berlin.
