= Yuriy Dumchev =

Soviet-Russian discus thrower

Yuriy Eduardovich Dumchev (Russian: Юрий Эдуардович Думчев; 5 August 1958 – 10 February 2016) was a Russian track and field athlete for the Soviet Union, who set the world record in the men's discus throw on 29 May 1983 with a distance of 71.86 metres. He was born in Rossosh. That mark, surpassed by Jürgen Schult in July 1986, is still the Russian record. A 1980 Olympian, Dumchev also represented the Soviet Union at the 1988 Summer Olympics in Seoul, South Korea, finishing in fourth place (66.42 m).

Since 1979, he acted in films (more than 50 films).

Dumchev died in Adler, Sochi on 10 February 2016, aged 57.

== International competitions ==
Year	Competition	Venue	Position	Event	Notes
Representing Soviet Union
1988	Olympic Games	Seoul, South Korea	4th	Discus	66.42 m

Records
Preceded by Wolfgang Schmidt	Men's Discus World and European Record Holder; 29 May 1983 – 6 June 1986	Succeeded by Jürgen Schult
