= Ray Lazdins =

Canadian discus thrower

Personal information
- Born: September 25, 1964 (age 61) Hamilton, Ontario, Canada

Sport
- Sport: Track and field
Medal record
Representing Canada
Commonwealth Games
Gold medal – first place	1986 Edinburgh	Discus throw

Ray Lazdins (born September 25, 1964) is a retired discus thrower from Canada, who represented his native country twice at the Summer Olympics, starting in 1988 in Seoul, South Korea. He is a nine-time national champion in the discus throw.

== Achievements ==
Year	Competition	Venue	Position	Notes
Representing Canada
1986	Commonwealth Games	Edinburgh, Scotland	1st	Discus
1988	Olympic Games	Seoul, South Korea	21st	Discus
1989	Jeux de la Francophonie	Morocco	2nd	Discus
1992	Olympic Games	Barcelona, Spain	21st	Discus
