= Emil Vladimirov =

Bulgarian discus thrower

Personal information
- Nationality: Bulgarian
- Born: 25 January 1952 (age 74) Vidin, Bulgaria

Sport
- Sport: Athletics
- Event: Discus throw

Emil Vladimirov (Bulgarian: Емил Владимиров, born 25 January 1952) is a Bulgarian athlete. He competed in the men's discus throw at the 1980 Summer Olympics.
