= Markku Tuokko =

Finnish track and field athlete

Personal information
- Born: 24 June 1951 Nurmo, Finland
- Died: 20 February 2015 (aged 63) Lohja, Finland

Sport
- Sport: Track and field
Medal record
Representing Finland
European Championships
Silver medal – second place	1978 Prague	Discus throw
Summer Universiade
Gold medal – first place	1975 Rome	Discus throw
Silver medal – second place	1979 Mexico City	Discus throw

Markku Tuokko (24 June 1951 – 20 February 2015) was a Finnish discus thrower, shot putter and teacher.

At the 1978 European Championships, Tuokko won the silver medal in discus with a result of 64.90 metres. At the 1980 Summer Olympics in Moscow, he finished ninth. In Montreal 1976 he didn't make it past the qualifying round. At the 1979 European Indoor Championships, he was fourth in shot put.

He won the Finnish discus throw championship five times (1977 and 1979–1982). His personal best in discus throw was 68.12 metres, achieved in May 1979 in Fresno. It remained the Finnish record until 2001, when Timo Tompuri threw 69.62 m. In shot put his personal best of 20.03 metres, which he threw in August 1979, earned him entrance in the 20 meter club.

In a European Cup contest in 1977, Tuokko tested positive for doping, along with fellow Finns high jumper Asko Pesonen and javelin thrower Seppo Hovinen. He had a career in education after quitting professional sports.

== See also ==
- List of sportspeople sanctioned for doping offences
