= Armin Lemme =

East German discus thrower (1955–2021)

Personal information
- Born: 28 October 1955 Packebusch, East Germany
- Died: 1 August 2021 (aged 65) Berlin, Germany

Sport
- Sport: Track and field
Medal record
Representing East Germany
Summer Universiade
Gold medal – first place	1981 Bucharest	Discus throw

Armin Lemme (28 October 1955 – 1 August 2021) was a track and field athlete from East Germany who competed in the men's discus throw event at the 1980 Summer Olympics. He set his personal best (68.50 metres) in 1982. Lemme was born in Packebusch, Bezirk Magdeburg on 28 October 1955. He died in Berlin on 1 August 2021, at the age of 65.

== International competitions ==
Year	Competition	Venue	Position	Notes
Representing East Germany
1980	Olympic Games	Moscow, Soviet Union	13th	59.44 m
1981	World Student Games	Bucharest, Romania	1st	65.90 m
1982	European Championships	Athens, Greece	4th	63.94 m

== Sources ==
- Armin Lemme at World Athletics
- Armin Lemme at Olympedia
- Armin Lemme at InterSportStats
