= Luis Delís =

Cuban athlete (born 1957)

Personal information
- Born: December 6, 1957 (age 68)
Medal record
Men's Athletics
Representing Cuba
Olympic Games
Bronze medal – third place	1980 Moscow	Discus
World Championships
Silver medal – second place	1983 Helsinki	Discus
Bronze medal – third place	1987 Rome	Discus
Pan American Games
Gold medal – first place	1983 Caracas	Discus
Gold medal – first place	1983 Caracas	Shot Put
Gold medal – first place	1987 Indianapolis	Discus
Universiade
Gold medal – first place	1983 Edmonton	Discus
Gold medal – first place	1985 Kobe	Discus
CAC Junior Championships (U20)
Gold medal – first place	1974 Maracaibo	Discus throw

Luis Mariano Delís Fournier (born December 6, 1957, in Guantánamo) is a Cuban retired athlete who competed in discus throw and shot put. Specializing in discus throw on the international scene, he won an Olympic bronze medal in 1980 as well as medals at the two first World Championships.

He finished second behind fellow Cuban Juan Martínez Brito in the discus throw event at the British 1985 AAA Championships.

In 1990 he tested positive for banned substances and was disqualified from competition for two years. In light of the ban, Delís chose to retire from athletics. After retiring he became a coach, training 1992 Olympic champion Maritza Martén.

== Achievements ==
Discus throw unless noted.

- 1993 Central American and Caribbean Games - silver medal
- 1987 World Championships - bronze medal
- 1987 Pan American Games - gold medal
- 1986 Central American and Caribbean Games - gold medal
- 1985 Central American and Caribbean Championships - gold medal
- 1985 Central American and Caribbean Championships - silver medal (shot put)
- 1985 Universiade - gold medal
- 1983 World Championships - silver medal
- 1983 Pan American Games - gold medal
- 1983 Pan American Games - silver medal (shot put)
- 1983 Universiade - gold medal
- 1982 Central American and Caribbean Games - gold medal
- 1982 Central American and Caribbean Games - gold medal (shot put)
- 1981 Central American and Caribbean Championships - gold medal
- 1981 Central American and Caribbean Championships - gold medal (shot put)
- 1980 Summer Olympics - bronze medal
- 1979 Pan American Games - bronze medal
- 1978 Central American and Caribbean Games - gold medal
- 1977 Central American and Caribbean Championships - silver medal

Year	Competition	Venue	Position	Event	Notes
Representing Cuba
1974	Central American and Caribbean Junior Championships (U-20)	Maracaibo, Venezuela	1st	Discus	49.02
1983	Ibero-American Championships	Barcelona, Spain	1st	Shot put	18.69 m
1983	Ibero-American Championships	Barcelona, Spain	1st	Discus	65.24 m
1988	Ibero-American Championships	Mexico City, Mexico	1st	Discus	65.20 m A
1992	Ibero-American Championships	Seville, Spain	3rd	Discus	61.18 m
1994	Ibero-American Championships	Mar del Plata, Argentina	4th	Discus	57.36 m

== See also ==
- List of sportspeople sanctioned for doping offences
