= 1999 World Championships in Athletics – Men's discus throw =

These are the official results of the Men's Discus Throw event at the 1999 World Championships in Seville, Spain. There were a total number of 37 participating athletes, with the final held on Tuesday August 24, 1999.

== Medalists ==
Gold	Anthony Washington; United States (USA)
Silver	Jürgen Schult; Germany (GER)
Bronze	Lars Riedel; Germany (GER)

== Schedule ==
- All times are Central European Time (UTC+1)

Qualification Round
Group A	Group B
22.08.1999 – 10:00h	22.08.1999 – 10:00h
Final Round
24.08.1999 – 20:30h

== Abbreviations ==
- All results shown are in metres

Q	automatic qualification
q	qualification by rank
DNS	did not start
NM	no mark
WR	world record
AR	area record
NR	national record
PB	personal best
SB	season best

== Qualification ==
- Held on Tuesday 1999-08-22 with the mark set at 65.00 metres

RANK	GROUP A	DISTANCE
1.	Virgilijus Alekna (LTU)	65.86 m
2.	Lars Riedel (GER)	64.00 m
3.	Michael Möllenbeck (GER)	63.53 m
4.	Aleksander Tammert (EST)	63.27 m
5.	Anthony Washington (USA)	63.18 m
6.	Li Shaojie (CHN)	62.89 m
7.	Róbert Fazekas (HUN)	62.79 m
8.	Igor Primc (SLO)	62.35 m
9.	Leonid Cherevko (BLR)	61.40 m
10.	Dmitriy Shevchenko (RUS)	60.80 m
11.	Jason Tunks (CAN)	60.13 m
12.	Andrzej Krawczyk (POL)	59.48 m
13.	Diego Fortuna (ITA)	58.52 m
14.	Romas Ubartas (LTU)	58.49 m
15.	Glen Smith (GBR)	58.27 m
16.	Libor Malina (CZE)	57.18 m
17.	Abbas Samimi (IRI)	54.21 m
18.	Ercüment Olgundeniz (TUR)	53.01 m
—	Costel Grasu (ROM)	DNF

RANK	GROUP B	DISTANCE
1.	Jürgen Schult (GER)	65.65 m
2.	Vladimir Dubrovshchik (BLR)	64.23 m
3.	Andy Bloom (USA)	64.06 m
4.	Aleksandr Borichevskiy (RUS)	63.40 m
5.	Vaclavas Kidykas (LTU)	62.83 m
6.	Robert Weir (GBR)	62.71 m
7.	Andreas Seelig (GER)	62.57 m
8.	John Godina (USA)	62.27 m
9.	Frantz Kruger (RSA)	62.02 m
10.	Mickaël Conjungo (CAF)	59.16 m
11.	Timo Tompuri (FIN)	58.90 m
12.	Ian Winchester (NZL)	58.74 m
13.	Nick Sweeney (IRL)	58.62 m
14.	Pieter van der Kruk Jr. (NED)	57.65 m
15.	Mario Pestano (ESP)	57.30 m
16.	Attila Horváth (HUN)	56.83 m
17.	Jason Gervais (CAN)	54.19 m
18.	Aleksandr Malashevich (BLR)	53.20 m

== Final ==
Rank	Athlete	Attempts						Distance	Note
Rank	Athlete	1	2	3	4	5	6	Distance	Note
1st place, gold medalist(s)	Anthony Washington (USA)	66.29	X	65.76	X	64.93	69.08	69.08 m	CR
2nd place, silver medalist(s)	Jürgen Schult (GER)	64.85	68.18	66.24	64.66	X	65.06	68.18 m	SB
3rd place, bronze medalist(s)	Lars Riedel (GER)	64.63	66.94	68.09	X	65.38	X	68.09 m	
4	Virgilijus Alekna (LTU)	65.45	66.49	65.95	64.61	X	67.53	67.53 m	SB
5	Vaclavas Kidykas (LTU)	65.05	62.28	61.91	X	X	X	65.05 m	
6	Michael Möllenbeck (GER)	63.33	64.90	64.54	X	X	64.51	64.90 m	
7	Vladimir Dubrovshchik (BLR)	64.00	63.86	63.83	61.00	63.46	62.72	64.00 m	
8	Aleksandr Borichevskiy (RUS)	63.59	61.05	60.56	X	61.24	X	63.59 m	
9	Li Shaojie (CHN)	62.15	63.22	62.38				63.22 m	SB
10	Aleksander Tammert (EST)	62.29	X	X				62.29 m	
11	Róbert Fazekas (HUN)	61.30	X	61.71				61.71 m	
—	Andy Bloom (USA)	X	X	X				NM	

== See also ==
- 1998 Men's European Championships Discus Throw (Budapest)
- 2000 Men's Olympic Discus Throw (Sydney)
- 2002 Men's European Championships Discus Throw (Munich)
