= 1997 World Championships in Athletics – Men's discus throw =

These are the official results of the Men's Discus Throw event at the 1997 World Championships in Athens, Greece. There were a total number of 42 participating athletes, with the final held on Sunday August 10, 1997. The qualification mark was set at 63.00 metres.

== Medalists ==
Gold	Lars Riedel; Germany (GER)
Silver	Virgilijus Alekna; Lithuania (LTU)
Bronze	Jürgen Schult; Germany (GER)

== Schedule ==
- All times are Eastern European Time (UTC+2)

Qualification Round
Group A	Group B
08.08.1997 – 17:30h	08.08.1997 – 19:30h
Final Round
10.08.1997 – 18:00h

== Abbreviations ==
- All results shown are in metres

Q	automatic qualification
q	qualification by rank
DNS	did not start
NM	no mark
WR	world record
AR	area record
NR	national record
PB	personal best
SB	season best

== Qualification ==
RANK	GROUP A	DISTANCE
1.	Jürgen Schult (GER)	64.60 m
2.	Vitaliy Sidorov (UKR)	63.08 m
3.	Vasiliy Kaptyukh (BLR)	63.06 m
4.	Andreas Seelig (GER)	62.94 m
5.	Aleksander Tammert (EST)	62.18 m
6.	Jason Tunks (CAN)	61.82 m
7.	Alexis Elizalde (CUB)	61.48 m
8.	Vaclavas Kidykas (LTU)	61.40 m
9.	Andy Bloom (USA)	60.74 m
10.	Olav Jenssen (NOR)	60.52 m
11.	Igor Primc (SLO)	59.98 m
12.	Ian Winchester (NZL)	59.70 m
13.	Jo Van Daele (BEL)	58.66 m
14.	Aleksandr Borichevskiy (RUS)	57.90 m
15.	Yu Wenge (CHN)	57.14 m
16.	Costel Grasu (ROM)	56.70 m
17.	Christos Papadopoulos (GRE)	56.44 m
18.	Shakti Singh (IND)	56.28 m
19.	Glen Smith (GBR)	54.40 m
20.	Dashdendev Makhashiri (MGL)	52.12 m
—	Duke Uperesa (ASA)	DNS

RANK	GROUP B	DISTANCE
1.	Lars Riedel (GER)	66.46 m
2.	Virgilijus Alekna (LTU)	65.22 m
3.	Adam Setliff (USA)	63.72 m
4.	John Godina (USA)	63.48 m
5.	Vladimir Dubrovshchik (BLR)	62.30 m
6.	Robert Weir (GBR)	62.26 m
7.	Frits Potgieter (RSA)	61.30 m
8.	Pieter van der Kruk Jr. (NED)	60.16 m
9.	Diego Fortuna (ITA)	60.06 m
10.	Leonid Cherevko (BLR)	60.06 m
11.	Sergey Lyakhov (RUS)	59.72 m
12.	Jean Pons (FRA)	59.46 m
13.	Li Shaojie (CHN)	58.24 m
14.	Libor Malina (CZE)	58.00 m
15.	Mickaël Conjungo (CAF)	57.82 m
16.	Attila Horváth (HUN)	57.72 m
17.	Marcelo Pugliese (ARG)	57.34 m
18.	Kjell Ove Hauge (NOR)	57.00 m
19.	Ramón Jiménez Gaona (PAR)	52.96 m
20.	Vansavang Savatdee (THA)	47.98 m
21.	Robert McNabb (COK)	41.00 m

== Final ==
Rank	Athlete	Attempts						Distance	Note
Rank	Athlete	1	2	3	4	5	6	Distance	Note
1st place, gold medalist(s)	Lars Riedel (GER)	65.48	68.24	68.54	X	X	66.80	68.54 m	
2nd place, silver medalist(s)	Virgilijus Alekna (LTU)	62.44	66.70	63.20	63.12	X	X	66.70 m	SB
3rd place, bronze medalist(s)	Jürgen Schult (GER)	66.14	65.20	65.54	X	62.34	64.94	66.14 m	SB
4	Vladimir Dubrovshchik (BLR)	62.98	60.30	65.36	65.46	62.44	66.12	66.12 m	SB
5	John Godina (USA)	65.40	X	57.32	64.82	64.92	64.30	65.40 m	
6	Andreas Seelig (GER)	63.00	64.48	62.80	X	64.12	63.64	64.48 m	
7	Adam Setliff (USA)	62.32	62.80	X	61.84	X	63.44	63.44 m	
8	Robert Weir (GBR)	63.06	60.18	61.40	62.22	X	58.70	63.06 m	
9	Jason Tunks (CAN)	59.16	62.30	61.88				62.30 m	
10	Vitaliy Sidorov (UKR)	60.32	59.68	X				60.32 m	
11	Vasiliy Kaptyukh (BLR)	60.12	X	X				60.12 m	
12	Aleksander Tammert (EST)	59.44	59.18	58.46				59.44 m	

== See also ==
- 1994 Men's European Championships Discus Throw (Helsinki)
- 1996 Men's Olympic Discus Throw (Atlanta)
- 1998 Men's European Championships Discus Throw (Budapest)
