= Athletics at the 2000 Summer Olympics – Men's discus throw =

Men's discus throw at the Games of the XXVII Olympiad
- Pictogram for athletics
- Venue: ANZ Stadium
- Dates: 24 September 2000 (qualifying); 25 September 2000 (final)
- Competitors: 45 from 28 nations
- Winning distance: 69.30

Medalists
1st place, gold medalist(s)		Virgilijus Alekna; Lithuania
2nd place, silver medalist(s)		Lars Riedel; Germany
3rd place, bronze medalist(s)		Frantz Kruger; South Africa

Video on YouTube Official Video Highlights, winning throw @ 6:25

The men's discus throw event at the 2000 Summer Olympics as part of the athletics program was held at the Olympic Stadium on Sunday, 24 September and Monday, 25 September. Forty-five athletes from 28 nations competed. The event was won by Virgilijus Alekna of Lithuania, the nation's second victory in the men's discus throw. Lars Riedel of Germany took silver, becoming the 13th man to win multiple discus throw medals. Frantz Kruger earned South Africa's first medal in the event with his bronze.

The qualifying athletes progressed through to the final where the qualifying distances are scrapped and they start afresh with up to six throws. The qualifying distance was 64.00 metres. For all qualifiers who did not achieve the standard, the remaining spaces in the final were filled by the longest throws until a total of 12 qualifiers.

== Background ==
This was the 24th appearance of the event, which is one of 12 athletics events to have been held at every Summer Olympics. The top nine finishers from the 1996 Games all returned, along with the last finalist: gold medalist Lars Riedel and sixth-place finisher Jürgen Schult of Germany, silver medalist Vladimir Dubrovshchik and bronze medalist Vasiliy Kaptyukh of Belarus, fourth-place finisher Anthony Washington and twelfth-place finisher Adam Setliff of the United States, fifth-place finisher Virgilijus Alekna and eighth-place finisher Vaclavas Kidykas of Lithuania, seventh-place finisher Vitaliy Sidorov of Ukraine, and ninth-place finisher Alexis Elizalde of Cuba. Schult was the world record holder and had medaled twice before (gold in 1988, silver in 1992). Riedel had won four of the last five world championships; Washington had won the latest. But Alekna had the best results in 2000 so far, hitting the second- and third-best throws to date (Schult's 1986 record still stands as of 2020).

Turkmenistan and Qatar each made their debut in the men's discus throw. The United States made its 23rd appearance, most of any nation, having missed only the boycotted 1980 Games.

== Qualification ==
Each National Olympic Committee was permitted to enter up to three athletes that had thrown 63.50 metres or further during the qualification period. The maximum number of athletes per nation had been set at 3 since the 1930 Olympic Congress. If an NOC had no athletes that qualified under that standard, one athlete that had thrown 62.00 metres or further could be entered.

== Competition format ==
The competition used the two-round format introduced in 1936, with the qualifying round completely separate from the divided final. In qualifying, each athlete received three attempts; those recording a mark of at least 64.00 metres advanced to the final. If fewer than 12 athletes achieved that distance, the top 12 would advance. The results of the qualifying round were then ignored. Finalists received three throws each, with the top eight competitors receiving an additional three attempts. The best distance among those six throws counted.

== Records ==
Prior to the competition, the existing world and Olympic records were as follows.

World record	Jürgen Schult (GDR)	74.08	Neubrandenburg, East Germany	6 June 1986
Olympic record	Lars Riedel (GER)	69.40	Atlanta, United States	31 July 1996

No new world or Olympic records were set during the competition.

== Schedule ==
All times are Australian Eastern Standard Time (UTC+10)

Date	Time	Round
Sunday, 24 September 2000	10:00	Qualifying
Monday, 25 September 2000	19:00	Final

== Results ==
=== Qualifying ===
Rank	Athlete	Nation	1	2	3	Distance	Notes
1	Lars Riedel	Germany	68.15	–	–	68.15	Q
2	Frantz Kruger	South Africa	67.54	–	–	67.54	Q
3	Virgilijus Alekna	Lithuania	67.10	–	–	67.10	Q
4	Vasiliy Kaptyukh	Belarus	65.90	–	–	65.90	Q, SB
5	Dmitriy Shevchenko	Russia	62.82	63.09	65.29	65.29	Q
6	Jason Tunks	Canada	64.40	–	–	64.40	Q
7	Vladimir Dubrovshchik	Belarus	64.03	–	–	64.03	Q
8	Jürgen Schult	Germany	63.76	60.97	X	63.76	q
9	Aleksander Tammert	Estonia	63.52	61.84	60.90	63.52	q
10	Adam Setliff	United States	X	63.25	–	63.25	q
11	Anthony Washington	United States	62.82	X	X	62.82	q
12	Michael Möllenbeck	Germany	62.30	62.72	61.92	62.72	q
13	Li Shaojie	China	62.29	X	59.71	62.29	SB
14	Diego Fortuna	Italy	60.12	X	62.24	62.24	
15	Aleksandr Borichevskiy	Russia	59.78	61.98	61.89	61.98	
16	Róbert Fazekas	Hungary	X	X	61.76	61.76	
17	John Godina	United States	57.67	61.60	X	61.60	
18	Frits Potgieter	South Africa	61.56	60.27	60.83	61.56	
19	David Martínez	Spain	61.50	X	59.97	61.50	
20	Alexis Elizalde	Cuba	57.75	61.13	59.96	61.13	
21	Magnús Aron Hallgrímsson	Iceland	60.95	58.79	60.03	60.95	
22	Jo Van Daele	Belgium	60.89	60.93	X	60.93	
23	Gábor Máté	Hungary	59.43	60.69	60.86	60.86	
24	Frank Casañas	Cuba	60.84	X	60.79	60.84	
25	Libor Malina	Czech Republic	59.38	X	60.83	60.83	
26	Vitaliy Sidorov	Russia	58.32	59.43	60.65	60.65	
27	Romas Ubartas	Lithuania	60.43	60.50	X	60.50	
28	Robert Weir	Great Britain	57.57	X	60.01	60.01	
29	Olgierd Stański	Poland	59.31	58.06	X	59.31	
30	Vaclavas Kidykas	Lithuania	57.86	58.96	58.09	58.96	
31	Ian Winchester	New Zealand	58.61	58.64	X	58.64	
32	Kyrylo Chuprynin	Ukraine	X	58.38	57.32	58.38	
33	Leonid Cherevko	Belarus	57.63	X	58.32	58.32	
34	Dragan Mustapić	Croatia	53.76	58.10	X	58.10	
35	Mickaël Conjungo	Central African Republic	X	57.85	55.60	57.85	
36	Nick Sweeney	Ireland	56.73	56.24	57.37	57.37	
37	Marcelo Pugliese	Argentina	X	53.49	56.30	56.30	
38	Glen Smith	Great Britain	56.22	55.31	54.36	56.22	
39	Rashid Shafi Al-Dosari	Qatar	X	54.47	53.42	54.47	
40	John Menton	Ireland	X	54.21	50.95	54.21	
41	Roman Poltoratskiy	Uzbekistan	45.40	X	47.83	47.83	
–	Zoltán Kővágó	Hungary	X	X	X	No mark	
–	Chary Mamedov	Turkmenistan	X	X	X	No mark	
–	Jason Gervais	Canada	X	X	X	No mark	
–	Costel Grasu	Romania	X	X	X	No mark	
–	Chima Ugwu	Nigeria	DNS				

=== Final ===
Rank	Athlete	Nation	1	2	3	4	5	6	Distance	Notes
1st place, gold medalist(s)	Virgilijus Alekna	Lithuania	58.55	67.54	68.73	66.64	69.30	64.78	69.30	
2nd place, silver medalist(s)	Lars Riedel	Germany	65.18	X	68.50	68.08	67.33	63.87	68.50	
3rd place, bronze medalist(s)	Frantz Kruger	South Africa	67.89	X	68.19	68.06	X	62.72	68.19	AR
4	Vasiliy Kaptyukh	Belarus	58.93	64.50	67.59	64.42	65.07	66.70	67.59	PB
5	Adam Setliff	United States	60.50	66.02	64.72	65.10	63.10	61.99	66.02	
6	Jason Tunks	Canada	59.59	64.58	65.35	X	65.80	64.38	65.80	
7	Vladimir Dubrovshchik	Belarus	63.95	65.13	X	64.32	X	60.15	65.13	
8	Jürgen Schult	Germany	X	60.83	63.34	64.41	62.63	61.96	64.41	
9	Aleksander Tammert	Estonia	55.84	59.26	63.25	Did not advance			63.25	
10	Michael Möllenbeck	Germany	61.19	60.13	63.14	Did not advance			63.14	
11	Dmitriy Shevchenko	Russia	X	X	62.65	Did not advance			62.65	
12	Anthony Washington	United States	X	X	59.87	Did not advance			59.87	

== See also ==
- 1997 Men's World Championships Discus Throw (Athens)
- 1998 Men's European Championships Discus Throw (Budapest)
- 1999 Men's World Championships Discus Throw (Seville)
- 2001 Men's World Championships Discus Throw (Edmonton)
- 2002 Men's European Championships Discus Throw (Munich)
- 2003 Men's World Championships Discus Throw (Paris)
