= Athletics at the 1993 Summer Universiade – Men's discus throw =

The men's discus throw event at the 1993 Summer Universiade was held at the UB Stadium in Buffalo, United States on 15 July 1993.

The winning margin was 2 cm which was also the winning margin at the previous edition of these games in 1991. As of 2024, these are the only two occasions when the men's discus throw has been won by less than 10 cm at these games.

== Medalists ==
| Gold | Silver | Bronze |
|---|---|---|
| Alexis Elizalde; Cuba | Adewale Olukoju; Nigeria | Nick Sweeney; Ireland |

== Results ==
=== Qualification ===
| Rank | Group | Athlete | Nationality | Result | Notes |
|---|---|---|---|---|---|
| 1 | ? | Alexis Elizalde | Cuba | 60.66 | |
| 2 | ? | Nick Sweeney | Ireland | 59.18 | |
| 3 | ? | Adewale Olukoju | Nigeria | 59.06 | |
| 4 | ? | Vladimir Dubrovshchik | Belarus | 58.62 | |
| 5 | ? | Andriy Kokhanovskiy | Ukraine | 57.96 | |
| 6 | ? | Virgilijus Alekna | Lithuania | 57.76 | |
| 7 | ? | Adam Setliff | United States | 57.38 | |
| 8 | ? | Lars Ola Sundt | Norway | 56.98 | |
| 9 | ? | Ramón Jiménez Gaona | Paraguay | 56.86 | |
| 10 | ? | Martti Halmesmäki | Finland | 56.60 | |
| 11 | ? | Mickaël Conjungo | Central African Republic | 56.22 | |
| 12 | ? | Andy Meyer | United States | 55.40 | |
| 13 | ? | Kari Pekola | Finland | 55.18 | |
| 14 | ? | Vitaliy Sidorov | Ukraine | 54.44 | |
| 15 | ? | Diego Fortuna | Italy | 53.58 | |
| 16 | ? | Hristos Papadopoulos | Greece | 53.26 | |
| 17 | ? | Bojan Paunovic | Canada | 51.54 | |
| 18 | ? | John Menton | Ireland | 51.34 | |
| 19 | ? | Darrin Morris | Great Britain | 51.08 | |
| 20 | ? | Bahadur Singh Sagoo | India | 50.98 | |
| 21 | ? | Ian Winchester | New Zealand | 48.80 | |
| 22 | ? | Chris Sua'mene | New Zealand | 48.50 | |
| 23 | ? | Alfredo Romero | Puerto Rico | 47.82 | |
| 24 | ? | Lu Ching-yi | Chinese Taipei | 46.80 | |
| 25 | ? | Juan Tello | Peru | 39.92 | |
| 26 | ? | Karim Behlok | Lebanon | 33.20 | |

=== Final ===
| Rank | Athlete | Nationality | Result | Notes |
|---|---|---|---|---|
| 1st place, gold medalist(s) | Alexis Elizalde | Cuba | 62.98 | |
| 2nd place, silver medalist(s) | Adewale Olukoju | Nigeria | 62.96 | |
| 3rd place, bronze medalist(s) | Nick Sweeney | Ireland | 62.52 | |
| 4 | Ramón Jiménez Gaona | Paraguay | 61.40 | |
| 5 | Vladimir Dubrovshchik | Belarus | 61.40 | |
| 6 | Andriy Kokhanovskiy | Ukraine | 60.92 | |
| 7 | Adam Setliff | United States | 58.84 | |
| 8 | Mickaël Conjungo | Central African Republic | 57.38 | |
| 9 | Lars Ola Sundt | Norway | 57.14 | |
| 10 | Martti Halmesmäki | Finland | 56.02 | |
| 11 | Virgilijus Alekna | Lithuania | 54.76 | |
| 12 | Andy Meyer | United States | 54.56 | |
