= 2003 World Championships in Athletics – Men's discus throw =

These are the official results of the Men's Discus Throw event at the 2003 World Championships in Paris, France. There were a total number of 27 participating athletes, with the final held on Tuesday 26 August 2003.

== Medalists ==
Gold	Virgilijus Alekna; Lithuania (LTU)
Silver	Róbert Fazekas; Hungary (HUN)
Bronze	Vasiliy Kaptyukh; Belarus (BLR)

== Schedule ==
- All times are Central European Time (UTC+1)

Qualification Round
Group A	Group B
24.08.2003 – 09:45h	24.08.2003 – 11:35h
Final Round
26.08.2003 – 19:50h

== Abbreviations ==
- All results shown are in metres

Q	automatic qualification
q	qualification by rank
DNS	did not start
NM	no mark
WR	world record
AR	area record
NR	national record
PB	personal best
SB	season best

== Qualification ==
- Held on Saturday 23 August 2003

RANK	FINAL	GROUP A
1.	Vasiliy Kaptyukh (BLR)	65.76 m
2.	Michael Möllenbeck (GER)	65.19 m
3.	Frantz Kruger (RSA)	65.04 m
4.	Róbert Fazekas (HUN)	64.44 m
5.	Dmitriy Shevchenko (RUS)	63.21 m
6.	Jason Tunks (CAN)	63.00 m
7.	Mario Pestano (ESP)	62.63 m
8.	Sergiu Ursu (ROU)	61.98 m
9.	Jo Van Daele (BEL)	61.64 m
10.	Casey Malone (USA)	61.50 m
11.	Nick Petrucci (USA)	59.58 m
12.	Lois Maikel Martínez (CUB)	57.87 m
13.	Gerd Kanter (EST)	56.63 m

RANK	FINAL	GROUP B
1.	Virgilijus Alekna (LTU)	68.29 m
2.	Lars Riedel (GER)	64.51 m
3.	Aleksander Tammert (EST)	63.53 m
4.	Carl Brown (USA)	63.01 m
5.	Leonid Cherevko (BLR)	62.46 m
6.	Rutger Smith (NED)	61.55 m
7.	Diego Fortuna (ITA)	61.46 m
8.	Libor Malina (CZE)	61.35 m
9.	Zoltán Kővágó (HUN)	61.31 m
10.	Aleksandr Borichevskiy (RUS)	60.21 m
11.	Frank Casañas (CUB)	59.99 m
12.	Chima Ugwu (NGR)	58.13 m
—	Yuriy Bilonoh (UKR)	NM
—	Gábor Máté (HUN)	NM

== Final ==
Rank	Athlete	Throws						Result	Note
Rank	Athlete	1	2	3	4	5	6	Result	Note
1st place, gold medalist(s)	Virgilijus Alekna (LTU)	69.69	X	66.14	68.75	X	X	69.69 m	SB
2nd place, silver medalist(s)	Róbert Fazekas (HUN)	66.86	69.01	X	64.94	65.63	68.78	69.01 m	
3rd place, bronze medalist(s)	Vasiliy Kaptyukh (BLR)	66.51	66.15	62.79	63.71	64.72	62.62	66.51 m	SB
4	Lars Riedel (GER)	66.28	63.81	66.28	X	65.51	62.67	66.28 m	
5	Michael Möllenbeck (GER)	62.27	66.11	65.49	66.23	X	X	66.23 m	
6	Frantz Kruger (RSA)	65.26	61.28	65.16	60.83	X	X	65.26 m	
7	Aleksander Tammert (EST)	61.15	63.02	X	64.50	60.88	61.86	64.50 m	
8	Mario Pestano (ESP)	64.39	63.92	61.97	61.86	63.29	X	64.39 m	
9	Carl Brown (USA)	58.11	61.23	62.66				62.66 m	
10	Dmitriy Shevchenko (RUS)	62.24	62.28	61.21				62.28 m	
11	Jason Tunks (CAN)	60.61	60.01	62.21				62.21 m	
12	Leonid Cherevko (BLR)	58.67	X	61.90				61.90 m	

== See also ==
- 2002 European Championships
- 2003 Pan American Games
