= Athletics at the 1997 Summer Universiade – Men's discus throw =

The men's discus throw event at the 1997 Summer Universiade was held at the Stadio Cibali in Catania, Italy, on 28 and 29 August.

== Medalists ==
Gold	Silver	Bronze
Vladimir Dubrovshchik; Belarus	Andy Bloom; United States	Doug Reynolds; United States

== Results ==
=== Qualification ===
Rank	Group	Athlete	Nationality	Result	Notes
1	?	Vladimir Dubrovshchik	Belarus	62.14	
2	?	Yuriy Bilonoh	Ukraine	60.64	
3	?	Pieter van der Kruk	Netherlands	60.04	
4	?	Vitaliy Sidorov	Ukraine	59.10	
5	?	Doug Reynolds	United States	58.94	
6	?	Leonid Cherevko	Belarus	58.70	
7	?	Aleksander Tammert	Estonia	58.66	
8	?	Frantz Kruger	South Africa	58.34	
9	?	Aleksandr Borichevskiy	Russia	58.20	
10	?	Andrzej Krawczyk	Poland	58.16	
11	?	Andy Bloom	United States	57.88	
12	?	Roland Varga	Hungary	55.62	
13	?	Alessandro Urlando	Italy	54.68	
14	?	Paulo Bernardo	Portugal	53.72	
15	?	Serge Doh	Ivory Coast	53.24	
16	?	Frits Potgieter	South Africa	53.20	
17	?	Ercüment Olgundeniz	Turkey	51.32	
18	?	Dashdendev Makhashiri	Mongolia	50.42	
19	?	Tarek Al-Najjar	Jordan	50.04	
20	?	Guillermo Heredia	Mexico	49.58	
21	?	Ivan Emilianov	Moldova	48.64	
22	?	Roman Rozna	Moldova	47.08	
23	?	Marco Verni	Chile	46.64	
24	?	Dante Yorges	Peru	46.48	

=== Final ===
Rank	Athlete	Nationality	Result	Notes
1st place, gold medalist(s)	Vladimir Dubrovshchik	Belarus	66.40	
2nd place, silver medalist(s)	Andy Bloom	United States	63.12	
3rd place, bronze medalist(s)	Doug Reynolds	United States	62.76	
4	Pieter van der Kruk	Netherlands	62.04	
5	Aleksander Tammert	Estonia	61.84	
6	Frantz Kruger	South Africa	61.64	
7	Vitaliy Sidorov	Ukraine	61.42	
8	Leonid Cherevko	Belarus	60.86	
9	Andrzej Krawczyk	Poland	60.02	
10	Aleksandr Borichevskiy	Russia	58.80	
11	Roland Varga	Hungary	57.38	
12	Yuriy Bilonoh	Ukraine	54.54	
