= 1998 European Athletics Championships – Men's discus throw =

Men's discus throw at the European Athletics Championships

The final of the Men's discus throw event at the 1998 European Championships in Budapest, Hungary was held on August 23, 1998. There were a total number of 31 participating athletes. The qualifying rounds were held on August 22, with the standard mark needed to reach the final set at 63.00 metres.

== Medalists ==
| Gold | Lars Riedel; Germany (GER) |
| Silver | Jürgen Schult; Germany (GER) |
| Bronze | Virgilijus Alekna; Lithuania (LTU) |

== Schedule ==
- All times are Central European Time (UTC+1)

Qualification Round
| Group A | Group B |
|---|---|
| 22.08.1998 – 10:00h | 22.08.1998 – 11:40h |
Final Round
23.08.1998 – 18:00h

== Qualification ==
=== Group A ===
| Rank | Overall | Athlete | Attempts | | | Distance |
| Rank | Overall | Athlete | 1 | 2 | 3 | Distance |
|---|---|---|---|---|---|---|
| 1 | 2 | Jürgen Schult (GER) | — | — | — | 63.63 m |
| 2 | 3 | Vladimir Dubrovshchik (BLR) | — | — | — | 63.12 m |
| 3 | 5 | Andreas Seelig (GER) | — | — | — | 61.96 m |
| 4 | 6 | Romas Ubartas (LTU) | — | — | — | 61.81 m |
| 5 | 8 | Robert Weir (GBR) | — | — | — | 61.36 m |
| 6 | 10 | Virgilijus Alekna (LTU) | — | — | — | 60.81 m |
| 7 | 11 | Libor Malina (CZE) | — | — | — | 60.69 m |
| 8 | 13 | Nick Sweeney (IRL) | — | — | — | 60.36 m |
| 9 | 19 | Olav Jenssen (NOR) | — | — | — | 57.78 m |
| 10 | 21 | Timo Tompuri (FIN) | — | — | — | 57.52 m |
| 11 | 24 | Otto Benczenleitner (HUN) | — | — | — | 56.54 m |
| 12 | 25 | Jean Pons (FRA) | — | — | — | 55.80 m |
| 13 | 28 | Kristian Petterson (SWE) | — | — | — | 54.02 m |
| 14 | 29 | Ercüment Olgundeniz (TUR) | — | — | — | 53.23 m |
| — | — | Dmitriy Shevchenko (RUS) | X | X | X | NM |

=== Group B ===
| Rank | Overall | Athlete | Attempts | | | Distance |
| Rank | Overall | Athlete | 1 | 2 | 3 | Distance |
|---|---|---|---|---|---|---|
| 1 | 1 | Róbert Fazekas (HUN) | — | — | — | 64.07 m |
| 2 | 4 | Lars Riedel (GER) | — | — | — | 62.03 m |
| 3 | 7 | Diego Fortuna (ITA) | — | — | — | 61.80 m |
| 4 | 9 | Vaclavas Kidykas (LTU) | — | — | — | 61.05 m |
| 5 | 12 | Leonid Cherevko (BLR) | — | — | — | 60.59 m |
| 6 | 14 | Vitaliy Sidorov (UKR) | — | — | — | 60.34 m |
| 7 | 15 | Glen Smith (GBR) | — | — | — | 58.97 m |
| 8 | 16 | Igor Primc (SLO) | — | — | — | 58.90 m |
| 9 | 17 | Andrzej Krawczyk (POL) | — | — | — | 58.09 m |
| 10 | 18 | Matias Borrman (SWE) | — | — | — | 58.06 m |
| 11 | 20 | Aleksander Tammert (EST) | — | — | — | 57.62 m |
| 12 | 22 | Zoltán Kővágó (HUN) | — | — | — | 56.89 m |
| 13 | 23 | Harri Uurainen (FIN) | — | — | — | 56.78 m |
| 14 | 26 | Jean-Claude Retel (FRA) | — | — | — | 55.44 m |
| 15 | 27 | Dragan Mustapić (CRO) | — | — | — | 54.73 m |
| 16 | 30 | Perris Wilkins (GBR) | — | — | — | 53.16 m |

== Final ==
| Rank | Athlete | Attempts | | | | | | Distance | Note |
| Rank | Athlete | 1 | 2 | 3 | 4 | 5 | 6 | Distance | Note |
|---|---|---|---|---|---|---|---|---|---|
| 1st place, gold medalist(s) | Lars Riedel (GER) | 67.07 | 66.79 | 66.27 | 66.16 | 66.01 | X | 67.07 m | |
| 2nd place, silver medalist(s) | Jürgen Schult (GER) | 65.81 | X | X | 66.69 | X | 66.53 | 66.69 m | SB |
| 3rd place, bronze medalist(s) | Virgilijus Alekna (LTU) | 66.18 | 63.93 | X | 66.46 | X | X | 66.46 m | |
| 4 | Róbert Fazekas (HUN) | 62.79 | X | 62.97 | 65.13 | 64.14 | X | 65.13 m | |
| 5 | Diego Fortuna (ITA) | 61.94 | 62.86 | 63.19 | 62.37 | 64.26 | X | 64.26 m | PB |
| 6 | Vladimir Dubrovshchik (BLR) | 62.82 | 56.10 | 61.30 | 63.96 | X | 60.10 | 63.96 m | |
| 7 | Andreas Seelig (GER) | 61.98 | X | X | 62.65 | X | 63.15 | 63.15 m | |
| 8 | Robert Weir (GBR) | 61.74 | 61.92 | X | 61.84 | X | 59.44 | 61.92 m | |
| 9 | Romas Ubartas (LTU) | 56.78 | 61.66 | 60.74 | | | | 61.66 m | |
| 10 | Libor Malina (CZE) | 58.88 | 60.49 | 60.58 | | | | 60.58 m | |
| 11 | Vaclavas Kidykas (LTU) | 59.29 | 60.21 | X | | | | 60.21 m | |
| 12 | Leonid Cherevko (BLR) | 54.86 | 59.13 | X | | | | 59.13 m | |

== See also ==
- 1995 Men's World Championships Discus Throw (Gothenburg)
- 1996 Men's Olympic Discus Throw (Atlanta)
- 1997 Men's World Championships Discus Throw (Athens)
- 1999 Men's World Championships Discus Throw (Seville)
- 2000 Men's Olympic Discus Throw (Sydney)
- 2001 Men's World Championships Discus Throw (Edmonton)
