= Athletics at the 1995 Summer Universiade – Men's discus throw =

The men's discus throw event at the 1995 Summer Universiade was held on 1 September at the Hakatanomori Athletic Stadium in Fukuoka, Japan.

== Results ==
Rank	Athlete	Nationality	#1	#2	#3	#4	#5	#6	Result	Notes
1st place, gold medalist(s)	Vitaliy Sidorov	Ukraine	x	x	62.16	x	x	x	62.16	
2nd place, silver medalist(s)	Frits Potgieter	South Africa	58.64	56.94	58.54	x	59.00	61.38	61.38	
3rd place, bronze medalist(s)	Diego Fortuna	Italy	56.66	58.10	59.82	57.64	58.76	61.16	61.16	
4	Gregory Hart	United States	x	58.34	58.66	x	59.78	58.86	59.78	
5	Kevin Fitzpatrick	United States	58.50	58.56	x	x	58.50	59.60	59.60	
6	Mickaël Conjungo	Central African Republic	x	57.72	x	x	57.96	58.52	58.52	
7	Carsten Kufahl	Germany	58.08	58.30	x	x	55.40	55.68	58.30	
8	Aleksander Tammert	Estonia	x	55.94	57.22	57.70	58.14	x	58.14	
9	Tareq Al-Najjar	Jordan	46.20	46.40	x				46.40	
10	Juan Tello	Peru	42.00	41.02	41.22				42.00	
11	Colibou Tchadouwa	Togo	37.04	35.90	38.56				38.56	
	Yuriy Bilonoh	Ukraine	x	x	x				NM	
	Yoshinori Nogawa	Japan	x	x	x				NM	
	Adewale Olukoju	Nigeria							DNS	
	Virgilijus Alekna	Lithuania							DNS	
	Chima Ugkiu	Nigeria							DNS	
