= 1992 World Junior Championships in Athletics – Men's discus throw =

The men's discus throw event at the 1992 World Junior Championships in Athletics was held in Seoul, South Korea, at Olympic Stadium on 16 and 17 September. A 2 kg (senior implement) discus was used.

== Medalists ==
Gold	Brian Milne; United States
Silver	Frits Potgieter; South Africa
Bronze	Marek Bílek; Czechoslovakia

== Results ==
=== Final ===
17 September

Rank	Name	Nationality	Attempts						Result	Notes
Rank	Name	Nationality	1	2	3	4	5	6	Result	Notes
1st place, gold medalist(s)	Brian Milne	United States	57.68	58.28	58.16	x	53.76	x	58.28	
2nd place, silver medalist(s)	Frits Potgieter	South Africa	53.58	53.40	53.66	56.28	54.18	x	56.28	
3rd place, bronze medalist(s)	Marek Bílek	Czechoslovakia	52.88	52.42	54.60	53.30	54.86	x	54.86	
4	Nikolay Orekhov	Commonwealth of Independent States	53.26	52.96	51.28	x	51.88	54.74	54.74	
5	Libor Malina	Czechoslovakia	50.82	53.04	54.06	53.82	x	x	54.06	
6	Andy Bloom	United States	50.96	52.26	44.06	50.86	50.48	51.98	52.26	
7	Evággelos Alatsatianos	Greece	x	47.24	51.28	51.54	x	x	51.54	
8	Mika Loikkanen	Finland	51.52	x	49.24	51.08	x	x	51.52	
9	Dejan Klajić	FR Yugoslavia	49.58	47.62	51.04				51.04	
10	Ian Winchester	New Zealand	x	47.86	50.70				50.70	
11	Matthias Rink	Germany	48.84	50.42	49.84				50.42	
12	Michel Hemmings	Cuba	45.04	49.76	45.60				49.76	

=== Qualifications ===
16 Sep

==== Group A ====
Rank	Name	Nationality	Attempts			Result	Notes
Rank	Name	Nationality	1	2	3	Result	Notes
1	Brian Milne	United States	56.34	-	-	56.34	Q
2	Frits Potgieter	South Africa	52.90	-	-	52.90	Q
3	Libor Malina	Czechoslovakia	51.12	-	-	51.12	Q
4	Matthias Rink	Germany	47.48	49.02	50.72	50.72	q
5	Dejan Klajić	FR Yugoslavia	47.22	50.10	49.70	50.10	q
6	Ian Winchester	New Zealand	49.52	x	x	49.52	q
7	Yann Etienvre	France	x	48.28	49.48	49.48	
8	Yoger Enrique Medina	Venezuela	x	48.94	48.38	48.94	
9	Lee Newman	United Kingdom	48.56	48.78	x	48.78	
10	Samson Ahmadu	Nigeria	40.22	38.90	x	40.22	

==== Group B ====
Rank	Name	Nationality	Attempts			Result	Notes
Rank	Name	Nationality	1	2	3	Result	Notes
1	Nikolay Orekhov	Commonwealth of Independent States	53.60	-	-	53.60	Q
2	Evággelos Alatsatianos	Greece	49.88	49.20	52.58	52.58	Q
3	Marek Bílek	Czechoslovakia	50.68	52.08	-	52.08	Q
4	Michel Hemmings	Cuba	48.86	49.24	51.84	51.84	Q
5	Andy Bloom	United States	50.00	x	x	50.00	q
6	Mika Loikkanen	Finland	48.28	49.42	49.80	49.80	q
7	Jamie Murphy	United Kingdom	44.60	49.36	48.50	49.36	
8	Julio Piñero	Argentina	48.50	48.78	48.38	48.78	
9	Einar Kristian Tveitå	Norway	48.32	46.86	46.30	48.32	
10	Marc Roos	Germany	x	48.24	x	48.24	
11	David Miquelez	Spain	46.20	x	45.76	46.20	

== Participation ==
According to an unofficial count, 21 athletes from 17 countries participated in the event.

- Argentina (1)
- Commonwealth of Independent States (1)
- Cuba (1)
- Czechoslovakia (2)
- Finland (1)
- France (1)
- Germany (2)
- Greece (1)
- New Zealand (1)
- Nigeria (1)
- Norway (1)
- South Africa (1)
- Spain (1)
- United Kingdom (2)
- United States (2)
- Venezuela (1)
- FR Yugoslavia (1)
