= 2002 European Athletics Championships – Men's discus throw =

Men's discus throw at the European Athletics Championships

The final of the Men's discus throw event at the 2002 European Championships in Munich, Germany was held on August 11, 2002. There were a total number of 28 participating athletes. The qualifying rounds were staged two days earlier, on August 9, with the mark set in 63.00 metres (3 + 9 athletes).

== Medalists ==
Gold	Róbert Fazekas; Hungary (HUN)
Silver	Virgilijus Alekna; Lithuania (LTU)
Bronze	Michael Möllenbeck; Germany (GER)

== Abbreviations ==
- All results shown are in metres

Q	automatic qualification
q	qualification by rank
DNS	did not start
NM	no mark
WR	world record
AR	area record
NR	national record
PB	personal best
SB	season best

== Records ==
Standing records prior to the 2002 European Athletics Championships
World Record	Jürgen Schult (GDR)	74.08 m	June 6, 1986	Neubrandenburg, East Germany
Event Record	Wolfgang Schmidt (GDR)	67.20 m	September 2, 1978	Prague, Czechoslovakia
Broken records during the 2002 European Athletics Championships
Event Record	Róbert Fazekas (HUN)	68.83 m	August 11, 2002	Munich, Germany

== Qualification ==
=== Group A ===
Rank	Overall	Athlete	Attempts			Distance
Rank	Overall	Athlete	1	2	3	Distance
1	1	Mario Pestano (ESP)	65.27	—	—	65.27 m
2	3	Virgilijus Alekna (LTU)	64.54	—	—	64.54 m
3	5	Gerd Kanter (EST)	63.66	—	—	63.66 m
4	10	Leonid Cherevko (BLR)	X	62.99	61.25	62.99 m
5	12	Ioan Oprea (ROM)	57.22	62.70	—	62.70 m
6	13	Roland Varga (HUN)	62.14	60.68	X	62.14 m
7	15	Igor Primc (SLO)	59.79	59.90	60.78	60.78 m
8	16	Diego Fortuna (ITA)	60.04	59.69	X	60.04 m
9	17	Torsten Schmidt (GER)	58.47	59.78	X	59.78 m
10	18	Einar Kristian Tveitå (NOR)	53.55	59.69	X	59.69 m
11	20	Mika Loikkanen (FIN)	55.78	55.95	59.19	59.19 m
12	22	Jean-Claude Retel (FRA)	58.29	58.20	X	58.29 m
13	26	Kristian Petterson (SWE)	X	55.85	X	55.85 m
14	28	Savvas Panavoglou (GRE)	54.24	53.08	X	54.24 m

=== Group B ===
Rank	Overall	Athlete	Attempts			Distance
Rank	Overall	Athlete	1	2	3	Distance
1	2	Aleksander Tammert (EST)	59.96	65.10	—	65.10 m
2	4	Michael Möllenbeck (GER)	63.92	—	—	63.92 m
3	6	Zoltán Kővágó (HUN)	61.37	X	63.52	63.52 m
4	7	Róbert Fazekas (HUN)	59.95	63.41	—	63.41 m
5	8	Timo Tompuri (FIN)	63.18	—	—	63.18 m
6	9	Dmitriy Shevchenko (RUS)	62.06	63.14	—	63.14 m
7	11	Jo Van Daele (BEL)	X	60.26	62.71	62.71 m
8	14	Libor Malina (CZE)	59.59	60.96	X	60.96 m
9	19	David Martínez (ESP)	59.27	X	X	59.27 m
10	21	Robert Weir (GBR)	58.37	X	X	58.37 m
11	23	Cristiano Andrei (ITA)	X	57.25	57.86	57.86 m
12	24	Timo Sinervo (FIN)	57.30	57.13	X	57.30 m
13	25	Jaroslav Žitňanský (SVK)	54.78	54.19	56.19	56.19 m
14	27	Olgierd Stański (POL)	55.64	X	52.09	55.64 m

== Final ==
Rank	Athlete	Attempts						Distance	Note
Rank	Athlete	1	2	3	4	5	6	Distance	Note
1st place, gold medalist(s)	Róbert Fazekas (HUN)	66.34	66.80	X	65.11	68.83	63.88	68.83 m	CR
2nd place, silver medalist(s)	Virgilijus Alekna (LTU)	66.62	61.52	63.11	61.26	63.75	X	66.62 m	
3rd place, bronze medalist(s)	Michael Möllenbeck (GER)	66.37	X	64.04	63.81	X	65.66	66.37 m	
4	Mario Pestano (ESP)	64.69	X	X	61.13	X	63.68	64.69 m	
5	Aleksander Tammert (EST)	X	61.45	64.55	60.28	62.10	X	64.55 m	
6	Dmitriy Shevchenko (RUS)	X	63.80	63.97	X	X	61.86	63.97 m	
7	Zoltán Kővágó (HUN)	61.66	59.65	61.92	X	X	63.63	63.63 m	
8	Leonid Cherevko (BLR)	61.72	61.48	X	X	X	59.96	61.72 m	
9	Timo Tompuri (FIN)	60.72	X	61.17				61.17 m	
10	Jo Van Daele (BEL)	61.07	X	60.64				61.07 m	
11	Ioan Oprea (ROM)	X	60.62	60.53				60.62 m	
12	Gerd Kanter (EST)	55.14	X	X				55.14 m	

== See also ==
- 2000 Men's Olympic Discus Throw (Sydney)
- 2001 Men's World Championships Discus Throw (Edmonton)
- 2003 Men's World Championships Discus Throw (Paris)
- 2004 Men's Olympic Discus Throw (Athens)
