= Athletics at the 1998 Commonwealth Games – Men's discus throw =

Men's discus throw at the Commonwealth Games

The men's discus throw event at the 1998 Commonwealth Games was held on 17 September in Kuala Lumpur.

== Results ==
Rank	Name	Nationality	#1	#2	#3	#4	#5	#6	Result	Notes
1st place, gold medalist(s)	Robert Weir	England	60.42	63.12	62.78	62.39	64.42	62.49	64.42	GR
2nd place, silver medalist(s)	Frantz Kruger	South Africa	61.23	62.68	x	61.63	63.91	63.93	63.93	
3rd place, bronze medalist(s)	Jason Tunks	Canada	x	61.71	62.22	x	x	61.59	62.22	
4	Glen Smith	England	58.65	59.66	x	60.49	58.22	58.95	60.49	
5	Ian Winchester	New Zealand	54.74	58.86	58.87	58.60	60.06	57.13	60.06	
6	Frederick Potgieter	South Africa	x	59.01	x	x	x	x	59.01	
7	Lee Newman	Wales	56.28	x	x	x	54.49	54.35	56.28	
8	Perris Wilkins	England	x	51.79	55.33	x	55.39	54.00	55.39	
9	Eric Forshaw	Canada	53.50	x	49.76				53.50	
10	Robert McNabb	Cook Islands	x	43.11	x				43.11	
11	Eric Koo Wan Siong	Mauritius	x	x	43.06				43.06	
