= Frits Potgieter =

South African discus thrower

Personal information
- Nationality: South African
- Born: March 13, 1974 (age 52) Pretoria, South Africa
- Height: 2.03 m (6 ft 8 in)
- Weight: 118 kg (260 lb)
Medal record
Men's athletics
Representing South Africa
African Championships
Gold medal – first place	2000 Algiers	Discus throw
Silver medal – second place	1998 Dakar	Discus throw
Summer Universiade
Silver medal – second place	1995 Fukuoka	Discus throw

Frederick Potgieter (born 13 March 1974) is a South African retired athlete who competed mostly in the discus throw. He won the silver medal at the 1992 World Junior Championships, as well as several senior medals at regional level. He represented his country at the 2000 Summer Olympics, as well as two World Championships without reaching the final.

Potgieter played for Waterkloof High School and Northern Transvaal's Craven for three years. He then participated at various sporting events, including the Summer Universiade and African Games winning medals in discus throwing discipline. A four-time gold medalist, he was placed in fourth place on the South African all-time list.

He finished second behind Bob Weir in the discus throw event at the British 1993 AAA Championships.

Following 2000 Summer Olympics, Potgieter joined Pretoria Rugby Club, after South African athletics initialized a new policy which states that bans athletes 26 and older to participate in international events.

His personal best in the event was 64.16 metres.

His brother, Karel Potgieter, is a former shot putter.

== Competition record ==
Year	Competition	Venue	Position	Event	Notes
Representing South Africa
1992	World Junior Championships	Seoul, South Korea	16th (q)	Shot put	16.15 m
1992	World Junior Championships	Seoul, South Korea	2nd	Discus throw	56.28 m
1994	Commonwealth Games	Victoria, Canada	5th	Discus throw	56.10 m
1995	World Championships	Gothenburg, Sweden	39th (q)	Discus throw	54.84 m
1995	Universiade	Fukuoka, Japan	2nd	Discus throw	61.38 m
1995	All-Africa Games	Harare, Zimbabwe	3rd	Discus throw	58.54 m
1997	World Championships	Athens, Greece	15th (q)	Discus throw	61.30 m
1997	Universiade	Catania, Italy	16th (q)	Discus throw	53.20 m
1998	African Championships	Dakar, Senegal	2nd	Discus throw	60.50 m
1998	Commonwealth Games	Kuala Lumpur, Malaysia	6th	Discus throw	59.01 m
1999	Universiade	Palma de Mallorca, Spain	5th	Discus throw	61.10 m
1999	All-Africa Games	Johannesburg, South Africa	2nd	Discus throw	60.59 m
2000	African Championships	Algiers, Algeria	1st	Discus throw	60.35 m
2000	Olympic Games	Sydney, Australia	18th (q)	Discus throw	61.56 m
