= Athletics at the 2004 Summer Olympics – Men's discus throw =

Men's discus throw at the Games of the XXVIII Olympiad
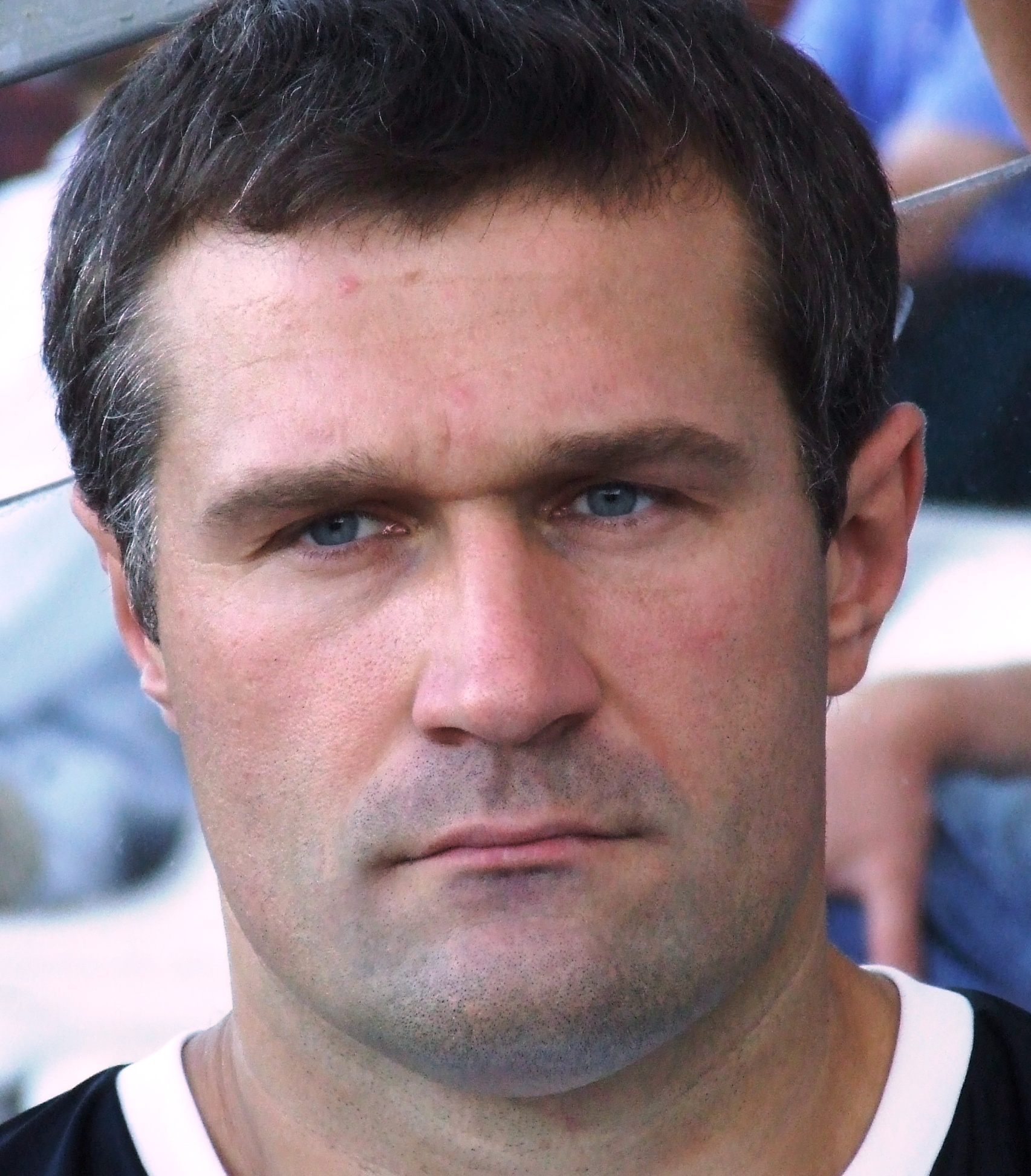
- Virgilijus Alekna (2007)
- Venue: Olympic Stadium
- Dates: 21–23 August
- Competitors: 39 from 26 nations
- Winning distance: 69.89 OR

Medalists
1st place, gold medalist(s)		Virgilijus Alekna; Lithuania
2nd place, silver medalist(s)		Zoltán Kővágó; Hungary
3rd place, bronze medalist(s)		Aleksander Tammert; Estonia

The men's discus throw competition at the 2004 Summer Olympics in Athens was held at the Olympic Stadium on 21–23 August. It was originally planned to hold the discus throw at the Ancient Olympia Stadium, but it was discovered that the field was not large enough to accommodate the range of modern discus throwers, and would have posed a danger to spectators. As such, it was decided to move the discus throw and to hold the shot put at the ancient stadium, despite the fact that the shot put was not contested at the Ancient Olympic Games. Thirty-nine athletes from 26 nations competed.

Hungary's Róbert Fazekas had initially finished first in the final but committed an anti-doping breach for failing to submit a proper urine sample during the drug test and was thereby not allowed to present his gold in the medal ceremony, resulting in his disqualification. Lithuania's Virgilijus Alekna, who originally placed second in the final, eventually defended his Olympic title at the time of the medal ceremony and was followed by Fazekas' teammate Zoltán Kővágó for the silver and Estonia's Aleksander Tammert for the bronze. Alekna became the 14th man to win multiple medals in the discus throw, and the 4th to win multiple gold medals—matching Martin Sheridan and Bud Houser, but still well behind Al Oerter's four championships. Kővágó's medal was Hungary's first medal in the event since Rudolf Bauer won gold in 1900. Tammert's bronze was Estonia's first men's discus throw medal.

== Background ==
This was the 25th appearance of the event, which is one of 12 athletics events to have been held at every Summer Olympics. The returning finalists from the 2000 Games were gold medalist (and 1996 finalist) Virgilijus Alekna of Lithuania, silver medalist (and 1996 gold medalist) Lars Riedel of Germany, bronze medalist Frantz Kruger of South Africa, fourth-place finisher Vasiliy Kaptyukh of Belarus, sixth-place finisher Jason Tunks of Canada, ninth-place finisher Aleksander Tammert of Estonia, tenth-place finisher Michael Möllenbeck of Germany, and eleventh-place finisher Dmitriy Shevchenko of Russia. Alekna was also the reigning world champion and runner-up in the 2002 European championship. The European winner was Hungarian Róbert Fazekas; he and Alekna were the favorites in Athens.

Moldova made its debut in the men's discus throw. The United States made its 24th appearance, most of any nation, having missed only the boycotted 1980 Games.

== Qualification ==
The qualification period for Athletics was 1 January 2003 to 9 August 2004. For the men's discus throw, each National Olympic Committee was permitted to enter up to three athletes who had thrown 64.00 metres or further during the qualification period. The maximum number of athletes per nation had been set at 3 since the 1930 Olympic Congress. If an NOC had no athletes that qualified under that standard, one athlete who had thrown 62.55 metres or further could be entered.

== Competition format ==
Each athlete received three throws in the qualifying round. All who achieved the qualifying distance progressed to the final. If fewer than twelve athletes achieved this mark, then the twelve furthest throwing athletes reached the final. Each finalist was allowed three throws in the last round, with the top eight athletes after that point being given three further attempts.

== Records ==
Prior to the competition, the existing world and Olympic records were as follows:

World record	Jürgen Schult (GDR)	74.08	Neubrandenburg, East Germany	6 June 1986
Olympic record	Lars Riedel (GER)	69.40	Atlanta, United States	31 July 1996

Virgilijus Alekna broke the Olympic record with his first throw in the final, marked at 69.89 metres. His only other legal throw, his fifth, surpassed the old record but not the new one, at 69.49 metres. Róbert Fazekas was the first man to throw over 70 metres in Olympic competition, but his disqualification for doping meant that his 70.93 metres throw was not counted as a record.

== Schedule ==
All times are Greece Standard Time (UTC+2)

Date	Time	Round
Saturday, 21 August 2004	9:00	Qualifying
Monday, 23 August 2004	20:20	Final

== Results ==
=== Qualifying round ===
Rule: Qualifying standard 64.50 (Q) or at least best 12 qualified (q).

Rank	Group	Athlete	Nation	1	2	3	Distance	Notes
~~1~~	B	Róbert Fazekas	Hungary	~~63.88~~	~~68.10~~	—	~~68.10~~	Q, DPG
2	A	Virgilijus Alekna	Lithuania	X	63.80	67.79	67.79	Q
3	A	Aleksander Tammert	Estonia	65.70	—	—	65.70	Q
4	B	Lars Riedel	Germany	64.20	—	—	64.20	Q
5	A	Hannes Hopley	South Africa	62.71	62.50	63.89	63.89	q
6	A	Gabor Mate	Hungary	57.40	62.43	63.41	63.41	q
7	A	Torsten Schmidt	Germany	56.86	60.63	63.40	63.40	q
8	B	Casey Malone	United States	59.99	63.27	61.83	63.27	q
9	B	Vasiliy Kaptyukh	Belarus	63.04	X	62.93	63.04	q
10	B	Frantz Kruger	South Africa	60.91	62.32	X	62.32	q
11	A	Libor Malina	Czech Republic	60.54	X	62.12	62.12	q
12	B	Zoltán Kővágó	Hungary	X	61.91	60.77	61.91	q
13	B	Mario Pestano	Spain	X	X	61.69	61.69	
14	A	Jarred Rome	United States	59.35	X	61.55	61.55	
15	B	Vikas Gowda	India	61.35	61.39	59.87	61.39	
16	A	Jason Tunks	Canada	61.21	60.02	60.34	61.21	
17	B	Rutger Smith	Netherlands	X	61.11	X	61.11	
18	A	Frank Casañas	Cuba	60.15	60.60	57.27	60.60	
19	B	Wu Tao	China	48.96	X	60.60	60.60	
20	A	Gerd Kanter	Estonia	X	60.05	X	60.05	
21	B	Michael Möllenbeck	Germany	56.42	59.79	X	59.79	
22	A	Ian Waltz	United States	58.97	58.55	57.52	58.97	
23	B	Savvas Panavoglou	Greece	57.26	58.47	57.62	58.47	
24	B	Aliaksandr Malashevich	Belarus	X	57.67	58.45	58.45	
25	A	Emeka Udechuku	Great Britain	X	58.41	55.79	58.41	
26	B	Aleksandr Borichevskiy	Russia	58.12	58.19	57.86	58.19	
27	B	Ercüment Olgundeniz	Turkey	57.13	58.17	X	58.17	
28	A	Leonid Cherevko	Belarus	57.98	X	57.89	57.98	
29	B	Abbas Samimi	Iran	57.57	X	56.24	57.57	
30	B	Lois Maikel Martínez	Cuba	57.18	57.10	X	57.18	
31	B	Igor Primc	Slovenia	55.70	56.33	55.43	56.33	
32	A	Marcelo Pugliese	Argentina	X	56.06	54.45	56.06	
33	A	Vadim Hranovschi	Moldova	53.77	52.30	55.64	55.64	
34	B	Omar Ahmed El Ghazaly	Egypt	X	55.53	55.27	55.53	
35	A	Dragan Mustapic	Croatia	54.66	X	X	54.66	
36	A	Jaroslav Žitňanský	Slovakia	53.30	X	51.87	53.30	
37	B	Shaka Sola	Samoa	50.36	51.10	50.97	51.10	
—	A	Anil Kumar	India	x	x	x	No mark	
—	A	Dmitriy Shevchenko	Russia	x	x	x	No mark	

=== Final ===
Rank	Athlete	Nation	1	2	3	4	5	6	Distance	Notes
1st place, gold medalist(s)	Virgilijus Alekna	Lithuania	69.89 OR	X	X	X	69.49	X	69.89	OR
2nd place, silver medalist(s)	Zoltán Kővágó	Hungary	57.31	66.40	66.03	67.04	58.25	X	67.04	
3rd place, bronze medalist(s)	Aleksander Tammert	Estonia	66.66	X	64.28	63.95	64.04	X	66.66	
4	Vasiliy Kaptyukh	Belarus	65.10	59.82	62.88	63.44	64.89	63.63	65.10	
5	Frantz Kruger	South Africa	64.34	X	61.01	62.53	X	60.73	64.34	
6	Casey Malone	United States	62.80	60.34	X	64.33	62.73	63.65	64.33	
7	Lars Riedel	Germany	X	62.80	X	—	—	—	62.80	
8	Hannes Hopley	South Africa	60.18	61.99	62.58	Did not advance			62.58	
9	Torsten Schmidt	Germany	x	61.18	61.10	Did not advance			61.18	
10	Libor Malina	Czech Republic	57.39	x	58.78	Did not advance			58.78	
11	Gabor Mate	Hungary	57.02	x	57.84	Did not advance			57.84	
—	Róbert Fazekas	Hungary	~~66.39~~	~~70.93~~	~~69.35~~	~~68.92~~	~~67.64~~	—	~~70.93~~	DPG
