= Terpeikiai =

- Village
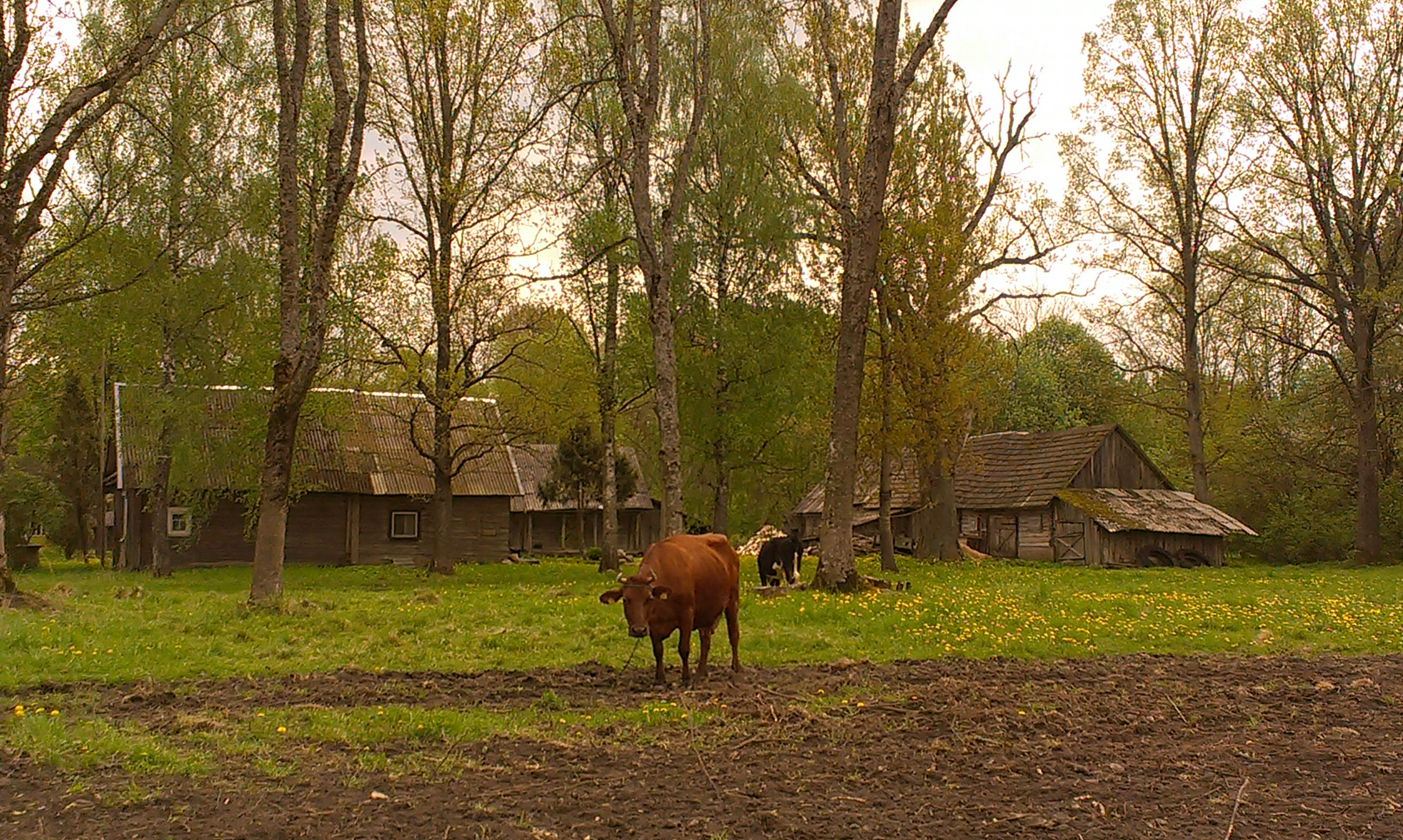

- Location within Lithuania
- Coordinates: 55°47′38.4″N 24°48′18″E
- Country: Lithuania
- County: Panevėžys County
- Municipality: Kupiškis District Municipality
- Eldership: Subačius Eldership

Population (2011)
  - Total: 48
- Time zone: UTC+2 (EET)
  - Summer (DST): UTC+3 (EEST)

Terpeikiai is a village in Panevėžys County, in northeastern Lithuania. According to the 2011 census, the village has a population of 48 people.

== Geography ==
Village situated on the right bank of river Lėvuo.

== Demography ==
Historical population

Year	Pop.	±% p.a.
1902	221	—
1923	204	−0.38%
1959	165	−0.59%
1970	146	−1.11%

Year	Pop.	±% p.a.
1979	99	−4.22%
1989	56	−5.54%
2001	49	−1.11%
2011	48	−0.21%

Source: 1902, 1923, 1959 & 1970, 1979, 1989, 2001, 2011

== Notable residents ==
- Virgilijus Alekna (born 1972), Olympic discus throw champions, member of parliament Seimas;
- Kajetonas Aleknavičius (1804–1874), poet and writer.
