= Torsten Schmidt (athlete) =

German discus thrower (born 1974)

Torsten Schmidt (born 9 December 1974) is a male discus thrower from Germany. His personal best throw is 64.78 metres, achieved in August 2004 in Thum.

His career highlight came when he finished ninth at the 2004 Summer Olympics. He had previously competed at the 2002 European Championships without reaching the final.

== Achievements ==
Year	Competition	Venue	Position	Notes
Representing Germany
2002	European Championships	Munich, Germany	17th	59.78 m
