= Robert Weir (discus thrower) =

British discus and hammer thrower (born 1961)

Bob Weir
Personal information
- Nationality: British (English)
- Born: 4 February 1961 (age 65) Birmingham, West Midlands
- Height: 191 cm (6 ft 3 in)
- Weight: 119 kg (262 lb)

Sport
- Sport: Athletics
- Event: Discus throw
- Club: Birchfield Harriers
Medal record
Athletics
Representing United Kingdom
Summer Universiade
Silver medal – second place	1983 Edmonton	Hammer throw
Representing England
Commonwealth Games
Gold medal – first place	1982 Brisbane	Hammer throw
Gold medal – first place	1998 Kuala Lumpur	Discus throw
Bronze medal – third place	1994 Victoria	Discus throw
Bronze medal – third place	2002 Manchester	Discus throw

Robert Boyd Weir (born 4 February 1961) is a male retired English athlete, best known as a discus thrower, who was a twelve-time national champion. Weir also achieved success in hammer throw, winning Commonwealth Games gold in 1982, and competed in three Olympic Games and strongman competitions.

== Biography ==
Weir attended Handsworth Grammar School in Birmingham and studied at Southern Methodist University in Dallas, Texas attaining a degree in Business Studies in 1983.

His personal best throw was 65.08 metres, achieved in August 2000 in Bedford. This places him fifth among English discus throwers, behind Perriss Wilkins, Richard Slaney, Glen Smith and Carl Myerscough. Weir represented Great Britain in the 1984 Summer Olympics. He represented England in the discus event and won a gold medal in the hammer event, at the 1982 Commonwealth Games in Brisbane, Queensland, Australia. Eight years later he won a bronze medal in the discus at the 1994 Commonwealth Games and followed this up with a gold medal in the discus four years later at the 1998 Commonwealth Games in Kuala Lumpur. He appeared in his final Commonwealth Games at the 2002 Commonwealth Games in Manchester and won a fourth medal in the process; another bronze in the discus.

Representing the SMU Mustangs track and field team, Weir won the 1983 NCAA Division I Outdoor Track and Field Championships in the hammer throw.

Weir was 12-times British discus throw champion after winning the British AAA Championships title or by virtue of being the highest placed British athlete from 1981 to 1984, 1993, 1995 to 2000 and 2002.

Weir also competed at the 1997 World's Strongest Man competition, finishing 3rd in a qualifying group of six, only being beaten by Jouko Ahola and Flemming Rasmussen who went on to finish as champion and runner-up respectively in the 1997 final .

== Family ==
Weir was born in England to Jamaican parents. His daughter, Jillian Weir, representing Canada, won bronze in the women's hammer at the 2022 Commonwealth Games in Birmingham, England, emulating her father's achievement 20 years before.

== International competitions ==
Year	Competition	Venue	Position	Event	Notes
Representing Great Britain and England
1981	Universiade	Bucharest, Romania	8th	Discus throw	56.42 m
1981	Universiade	Bucharest, Romania	12th	Hammer throw	64.56 m
1982	Commonwealth Games	Brisbane, Australia	5th	Discus throw	59.26 m
1982	Commonwealth Games	Brisbane, Australia	1st	Hammer throw	75.08 m
1983	Universiade	Edmonton, Canada	2nd	Hammer throw	74.10 m
1983	World Championships	Helsinki, Finland	15th (q)	Hammer throw	71.62 m
1984	Olympic Games	Los Angeles, United States	10th	Discus throw	61.36 m
1984	Olympic Games	Los Angeles, United States	8th	Hammer throw	72.62 m
1993	World Championships	Stuttgart, Germany	18th (q)	Discus throw	59.74 m
1994	European Championships	Helsinki, Finland	13th (q)	Discus throw	57.18 m
1994	Commonwealth Games	Victoria, Canada	3rd	Discus throw	60.86 m
1995	World Championships	Gothenburg, Sweden	9th	Discus throw	63.14 m
1996	Olympic Games	Atlanta, United States	15th (q)	Discus throw	61.64 m
1997	World Championships	Athens, Greece	8th	Discus throw	63.06 m
1998	European Championships	Budapest, Hungary	8th	Discus throw	61.92 m
1998	World Cup	Johannesburg, South Africa	5th	Discus throw	64.39 m
1998	Commonwealth Games	Kuala Lumpur, Malaysia	1st	Discus throw	64.42 m
1999	World Championships	Seville, Spain	13th (q)	Discus throw	62.71 m
2000	Olympic Games	Sydney, Australia	28th (q)	Discus throw	60.01 m
2001	World Championships	Edmonton, Canada	15th (q)	Discus throw	61.05 m
2002	Commonwealth Games	Manchester, United Kingdom	3rd	Discus throw	59.24 m
2002	European Championships	Munich, Germany	21st (q)	Discus throw	58.37 m
2002	World Cup	Madrid, Spain	7th	Discus throw	58.91 m
