= Athletics at the 1983 Summer Universiade – Men's hammer throw =

The men's hammer throw event at the 1983 Summer Universiade was held at the Commonwealth Stadium in Edmonton, Canada on 8 July 1983.

== Results ==
| Rank | Athlete | Nationality | Result | Notes |
|---|---|---|---|---|
| 1st place, gold medalist(s) | Jüri Tamm | Soviet Union | 76.82 | |
| 2nd place, silver medalist(s) | Robert Weir | Great Britain | 74.10 | |
| 3rd place, bronze medalist(s) | Yuriy Pastukhov | Soviet Union | 73.38 | |
| 4 | Orlando Bianchini | Italy | 73.10 | |
| 5 | Bill Green | United States | 69.74 | |
| 6 | Rafael Jimeno | Spain | 66.80 | |
| 7 | Ivan Tanev | Bulgaria | 65.00 | |
| 8 | Greg Gassner | United States | 61.84 | |
