= Olav Jenssen =

Norwegian discus thrower

Personal information
- Born: 11 May 1962 (age 64) Vinje Municipality, Norway

Sport
- Sport: Track and Field
- Event: Discus

Olav Jenssen (born 11 May 1962) is a Norwegian discus thrower.

He was born in Vinje Municipality. He finished eleventh at 1981 European Junior Championships and competed at the 1986 European Championships, the 1992 Summer Olympics, the 1995 World Championships, the 1997 World Championships and the 1998 European Championships without reaching the final. He was Norwegian champion in 1987, 1997 and 1998, representing the club IF Urædd except for some seasons in SK Vidar in the mid-1990s.

Jenssen was an NCAA champion thrower for the UTEP Miners track and field team, winning the discus at the 1986 NCAA Division I Outdoor Track and Field Championships. He threw the discus and shot put but focused on the discus at the expense of his shot put marks.
