= 1988 World Junior Championships in Athletics – Men's discus throw =

The men's discus throw event at the 1988 World Junior Championships in Athletics was held in Sudbury, Ontario, Canada, at Laurentian University Stadium on 27 and 28 July. A 2 kg (senior implement) discus was used.

== Medalists ==
Gold	Andreas Seelig; East Germany
Silver	Kamy Keshmiri; United States
Bronze	Yuriy Nesteryets; Soviet Union

== Results ==
=== Final ===
28 July

Rank	Name	Nationality	Attempts						Result	Notes
Rank	Name	Nationality	1	2	3	4	5	6	Result	Notes
1st place, gold medalist(s)	Andreas Seelig	East Germany	54.06	56.96	56.90	57.90	58.60	56.20	58.60	
2nd place, silver medalist(s)	Kamy Keshmiri	United States	48.38	48.60	53.18	50.86	54.68	54.36	54.68	
3rd place, bronze medalist(s)	Yuriy Nesteryets	Soviet Union	51.26	x	x	51.96	53.70	52.72	53.70	
4	Vitaliy Sidorov	Soviet Union	53.00	x	x	x	x	52.08	53.00	
5	Tapani Alentola	Finland	45.78	46.68	49.70	48.90	51.40	x	51.44	
6	Pedro Acosta	Cuba	x	49.66	49.24	49.62	49.98	50.98	50.98	
7	Jaroslav Žitnanský	Czechoslovakia	49.66	48.30	49.26	x	x	50.16	50.16	
8	Ma Wei	China	x	50.16	x	x	x	x	50.16	
9	Michael Möllenbeck	West Germany	44.74	x	49.30				49.30	
10	Dariusz Kosinski	Poland	48.74	x	x				48.74	
11	Joachim Tidow	West Germany	47.92	x	46.22				47.92	
12	Ramón Jiménez Gaona	Paraguay	44.26	x	45.46				45.46	

=== Qualifications ===
27 Jul

==== Group A ====
Rank	Name	Nationality	Attempts			Result	Notes
Rank	Name	Nationality	1	2	3	Result	Notes
1	Andreas Seelig	East Germany	55.94	-	-	55.94	Q
2	Vitaliy Sidorov	Soviet Union	49.32	52.88	-	52.88	Q
3	Yuriy Nesteryets	Soviet Union	50.82	52.80	-	52.80	Q
4	Michael Möllenbeck	West Germany	52.68	-	-	52.68	Q
5	Pedro Acosta	Cuba	x	52.44	-	52.44	Q
6	Kamy Keshmiri	United States	48.50	45.78	51.28	51.28	Q
7	Tapani Alentola	Finland	50.60	x	47.38	50.60	q
8	Jaroslav Žitnanský	Czechoslovakia	47.68	50.18	x	50.18	q
9	Dariusz Kosinski	Poland	49.88	x	x	49.88	q
10	Joachim Tidow	West Germany	49.56	47.98	x	49.56	q
11	Ramón Jiménez Gaona	Paraguay	49.30	48.88	47.92	49.30	q
12	Ma Wei	China	47.36	48.78	48.84	48.84	q
13	Jean Pons	France	45.02	48.48	48.38	48.48	
14	John Nichols	United States	44.90	48.14	x	48.14	
15	Paolo Dal Soglio	Italy	44.84	46.58	48.12	48.12	
16	Janne Sandvik	Finland	46.88	x	47.80	47.80	
17	Hussein Ali Al-Sayed	Kuwait	32.96	x	32.82	32.96	
	Lee Andrews	Canada	x	x	x	NM	

== Participation ==
According to an unofficial count, 18 athletes from 14 countries participated in the event.

- Canada (1)
- China (1)
- Cuba (1)
- Czechoslovakia (1)
- East Germany (1)
- Finland (2)
- France (1)
- Italy (1)
- Kuwait (1)
- Paraguay (1)
- Poland (1)
- Soviet Union (2)
- United States (2)
- West Germany (2)
