= Ian Winchester =

New Zealand discus thrower

Personal information
- Born: 27 May 1973 (age 53) Hamilton, New Zealand

Sport
- Sport: Track and field

Ian Dennis Winchester (born 27 May 1973) is a discus thrower from New Zealand.

He finished tenth at the 1992 World Junior Championships, eighth at the 1998 World Cup and fifth at the 1998 Commonwealth Games (where he also finished eighth in shot put) He also competed at two World Championships (1997, 1999) as well as the 2000 Summer Olympics without reaching the final round.

Competing for the SMU Mustangs track and field team, Tunks placed 4th in the discus throw at the 1996 NCAA Division I Outdoor Track and Field Championships.

His personal best throw is 65.03 metres, achieved in May 2002 in Salinas. This was the New Zealand national record until it was broken by Connor Bell in 2023.

== Achievements ==
Year	Competition	Venue	Position	Event	Notes
Representing New Zealand
1992	World Junior Championships	Seoul, South Korea	21st (q)	Shot put	14.39 m
1992	World Junior Championships	Seoul, South Korea	10th	Discus throw	50.70 m
1993	Universiade	Buffalo, United States	21st (q)	Discus throw	48.80 m
1997	World Championships	Athens, Greece	23rd (q)	Discus throw	59.70 m
1998	Commonwealth Games	Kuala Lumpur, Malaysia	8th	Shot put	18.35 m
1998	Commonwealth Games	Kuala Lumpur, Malaysia	5th	Discus throw	60.16 m
1999	World Championships	Seville, Spain	24th (q)	Discus throw	58.74 m
2000	Olympic Games	Sydney, Australia	31st (q)	Discus throw	58.64 m

== Personal bests ==
Event	Distance	Place	Date
Discus	65.03m NR	Salinas, CA	2002
