= Pieter van der Kruk Jr. =

Dutch discus thrower

Personal information
- Born: 10 February 1972 (age 53)

Sport
- Country: Netherlands
- Sport: Athletics
- Event: Discus throw

Pieter van der Kruk Jr. (born 10 February 1972) is a retired Dutch discus thrower.

He competed at the 1997 and 1999 World Championships without reaching the final. He also became Dutch champion in 1997, 2000 and 2001 before Rutger Smith's streak of national titles started.

His personal best throw was 66.03 metres, achieved in August 1999 in Leiden.
