= Vasiliy Kaptyukh =

Belarusian discus thrower (born 1967)

Personal information
- Native name: Васіль Барысавіч Капцюх
- Full name: Vasiliy Borisovich Kaptyukh
- Nationality: Belarusian
- Born: June 27, 1967 (age 59) Maladzyechna, Byelorussian SSR, Soviet Union
- Height: 1.97 m (6 ft 6 in)
- Weight: 120 kg (265 lb)

Sport
- Country: Soviet Union (1985-1991); Belarus (1992-2005)
- Sport: Athletics
- Event: Discus throw
- Turned pro: 1985
- Retired: 2010

Achievements and titles
- Olympic finals: Atlanta 1996: Discus throw; Bronze
- World finals: Gothenburg 1995: Discus throw; Bronze; Paris 2003: Discus throw; Bronze
- Personal best: 67.59 m (2000)
Medal record
Men's Athletics
Representing Belarus
Olympic Games
Bronze medal – third place	1996 Atlanta	Discus
World Championships
Bronze medal – third place	1995 Gothenburg	Discus
Bronze medal – third place	2003 Paris	Discus

Vasiliy Borisovich Kaptyukh (Belarusian: Васіль Барысавіч Капцюх; Russian: Василий Борисович Каптюх; born June 27, 1967, in Maladzyechna) is a Belarusian former discus thrower who won the Olympic bronze medal in 1996. He has in fact never won gold or silver medals in major competitions, and finished fourth in major contests such as the 2000 and 2004 Summer Olympics, despite setting his personal best throw at the former, with 67.59 metres.

His father Boris and aunt Vera Kaptyukh were also prominent athletes.

He made his first international appearance at the 1985 European Athletics Junior Championships, where he finished third to win the discus bronze medal.

He retired from international athletics in June 2010.

His son, Roman Kaptyukh, was among the victims of the 2011 Minsk Metro bombing.

== Achievements ==
Achievements representing Soviet Union
Year	Competition	Venue	Position	Notes
1985	European Junior Championships	Cottbus, East Germany	3rd	57.18 m
1986	World Junior Championships	Athens, Greece	3rd	58.22 m
1990	European Championships	Split, Yugoslavia	4th	63.72 m
1991	World Championships	Tokyo, Japan	5th (qualifiers)	Withdrew injured

Achievements representing Belarus
Year	Competition	Venue	Position	Notes
1993	World Championships	Stuttgart, Germany	7th	61.64 m
1995	World Championships	Gothenburg, Sweden	3rd	65.88 m
1995	IAAF Grand Prix Final	Monte Carlo, Monaco	4th	66.30 m
1996	Olympic Games	Atlanta, United States	3rd	65.80 m
1997	World Championships	Athens, Greece	11th	60.12 m
1997	IAAF Grand Prix Final	Fukuoka, Japan	7th	61.80 m
2000	Olympic Games	Sydney, Australia	4th	67.59 m
2001	World Championships	Edmonton, Canada	6th	66.25 m
2001	IAAF Grand Prix Final	Melbourne, Australia	8th	61.60 m
2003	World Championships	Paris, France	3rd	66.51 m
2003	World Athletics Final	Monte Carlo, Monaco	3rd	65.85 m
2004	Olympic Games	Athens, Greece	4th	65.10 m
2004	World Athletics Final	Monte Carlo, Monaco	6th	63.03 m
2005	World Championships	Helsinki, Finland	9th (qualifiers)	61.04 m
