= Diego Fortuna =

Italian discus thrower (born 1968)

Personal information
- National team: Italy: 39 caps (1995-2005)
- Born: 14 February 1968 (age 58) Vicenza, Italy
- Height: 1.88 m (6 ft 2 in)
- Weight: 115 kg (254 lb)

Sport
- Sport: Athletics
- Event: Discus throw
- Club: C.S. Carabinieri
- Retired: 2014

Achievements and titles
- Personal best: Discus throw: 64.69 (2000)
Medal record
Event	1st	2nd	3rd
Summer Universiade	0	0	1
Mediterranean Games	1	1	0
Military World Games	1	0	1
World Military Championships	1	0	0
Total	3	1	2

Diego Fortuna (born 14 February 1968) is a retired male discus thrower from Italy.

== Biography ==
He represented his native country in two consecutive Summer Olympics (1996 and 2000). He won the men's discus throw event at the 2001 Mediterranean Games, and set his personal best (64.69 m) on 24 June 2000 at an international meeting in Ravenna.

== Achievements ==
Year	Competition	Venue	Position	Notes
Representing Italy
1993	Universiade	Buffalo, United States	15th (q)	53.58 m
1994	European Championships	Helsinki, Finland	19th (q)	55.70 m
1995	World Championships	Gothenburg, Sweden	21st (q)	58.74 m
1995	Universiade	Fukuoka, Japan	3rd	61.16 m
1996	Olympic Games	Atlanta, United States	19th (q)	60.08 m
1997	Mediterranean Games	Bari, Italy	2nd	59.90 m
1997	World Championships	Athens, Greece	19th (q)	60.06 m
1998	European Championships	Budapest, Hungary	5th	64.26 m
1999	World Championships	Seville, Spain	26th (q)	58.52 m
2000	Olympic Games	Sydney, Australia	14th (q)	62.24 m
2001	Mediterranean Games	Radès, Tunisia	1st	64.40 m
2002	European Championships	Munich, Germany	16th (q)	60.04 m
2003	World Championships	Paris, France	14th (q)	61.46 m

== National titles ==
Fortuna won 14 national championships at individual senior level.

- Italian Athletics Championships
  - Discus throw: 1994, 1995, 1997, 1998, 1999, 2000, 2001, 2004 (8)
- Italian Winter Throwing Championships
  - Discus throw: 1995, 1998, 1999, 2000, 2003, 2008 (6)

== See also ==
- Italian all-time top lists - Discus throw
- List of Italian records in masters athletics
