= Einar Kristian Tveitå =

Norwegian discus thrower

Personal information
- Born: 22 February 1973 (age 53)

Sport
- Sport: Track and field

Einar Kristian Tveitå (born 22 February 1973) is a retired Norwegian discus thrower.

== Biography ==
He finished twelfth in the discus final at the 2001 World Championships with a throw of 59.11 metres. He competed at the 1992 World Junior Championships and the 2002 European Championships without reaching the final, and also participated at the European Cup in 1998, 2000, 2001 and 2002. He became Norwegian champion in discus throw in 1999, 2000, 2001 and 2002, representing the club IL i BUL. His personal best throw was 63.64 metres, achieved in September 1999 in Hafnarfjörður.

In February 2010 he took the PhD degree at the Faculty of Medicine, University of Oslo, with the thesis Adhesive Capsulitis, Hydrodilatation and Some Aspects of Validity Regarding Shoulder Assessments. The thesis was about the treatment of adhesive capsulitis of shoulder.

== Achievements ==
Year	Competition	Venue	Position	Notes
Representing Norway
1992	World Junior Championships	Seoul, South Korea	18th (q)	48.32 m
2001	World Championships	Edmonton, Canada	12th	59.11 m
2002	European Championships	Munich, Germany	18th	59.69 m
