= 2001 World Championships in Athletics – Men's discus throw =

Discus tournament

These are the official results of the Men's Discus Throw event at the 2001 World Championships in Edmonton, Alberta, Canada. There were a total number of 26 participating athletes, with the final held on Wednesday 8 August 2001. The qualification mark was set at 65.50 metres.

== Medalists ==
Gold	Lars Riedel; Germany (GER)
Silver	Virgilijus Alekna; Lithuania (LTU)
Bronze	Michael Möllenbeck; Germany (GER)

== Schedule ==
- All times are Mountain Standard Time (UTC-7)

Qualification Round
Group A	Group B
06.08.2001 – 09:00h	06.08.2001 – 10:45h
Final Round
08.08.2001 – 20:00h

== Abbreviations ==
- All results shown are in metres

Q	automatic qualification
q	qualification by rank
DNS	did not start
NM	no mark
WR	world record
AR	area record
NR	national record
PB	personal best
SB	season best

== Records ==
Standing records prior to the 2001 World Athletics Championships
World Record	Jürgen Schult (GDR)	74.08 m	June 6, 1986	Neubrandenburg, East Germany
Event Record	Anthony Washington (USA)	69.08 m	August 24, 1999	Seville, Spain
Season Best	Virgilijus Alekna (LTU)	70.99 m	March 30, 2001	Stellenbosch, South Africa

== Startlist ==
Order	№	Athlete	Season Best	Personal Best
GROUP A
1	945	Frantz Kruger (RSA)	69.96	69.96
2	484	Michael Möllenbeck (GER)	67.17	67.44
3	863	Einar Kristian Tveitå (NOR)	62.41	63.64
4	745	Romas Ubartas (LTU)	65.25	70.06
5	1142	Andy Bloom (USA)	66.17	68.46
6	186	Jason Tunks (CAN)	67.70	67.88
7	541	Zoltán Kővágó (HUN)	66.93	66.93
8	1164	John Godina (USA)	67.66	69.91
9	25	Marcelo Pugliese (ARG)	62.91	64.20
10	444	Robert Weir (GBR)	63.03	65.08
11	89	Jo Van Daele (BEL)	64.24	64.24
12	363	Timo Tompuri (FIN)	69.62	69.62
13	109	Vasiliy Kaptyukh (BLR)	66.00	67.59
GROUP B
1	486	Lars Riedel (GER)	68.26	71.50
2	1017	Igor Primc (SLO)	62.74	64.79
3	990	Dmitriy Shevchenko (RUS)	66.48	67.30
4	743	Virgilijus Alekna (LTU)	70.99	73.88
5	538	Róbert Fazekas (HUN)	68.09	68.09
6	925	Rashid Shafi Al-Dosari (QAT)	62.77	62.77
7	1201	Adam Setliff (USA)	68.94	68.94
8	933	Ionel Oprea (ROM)	63.64	63.64
9	329	Aleksander Tammert (EST)	67.10	67.41
10	544	Roland Varga (HUN)	64.44	65.39
11	106	Vladimir Dubrovshchik (BLR)	64.41	69.28
12	314	Mario Pestano (ESP)	67.92	67.92
13	481	Michael Lischka (GER)	65.04	65.04

== Qualification ==
=== Group A ===
Rank	Overall	Athlete	Attempts			Distance	Note
Rank	Overall	Athlete	1	2	3	Distance	Note
1	2	Vasiliy Kaptyukh (BLR)	65.71	—	—	65.71 m	
2	4	Frantz Kruger (RSA)	63.91	64.79	64.59	64.79 m	
3	6	Jason Tunks (CAN)	X	64.34	63.14	64.34 m	
4	8	Timo Tompuri (FIN)	61.33	58.70	63.34	63.34 m	
5	10	Michael Möllenbeck (GER)	X	61.13	62.54	62.54 m	
6	12	Einar Kristian Tveitå (NOR)	60.86	61.85	58.38	61.85 m	
7	14	Romas Ubartas (LTU)	58.44	61.49	X	61.49 m	
8	15	Robert Weir (GBR)	61.05	X	X	61.05 m	
9	17	Jo Van Daele (BEL)	57.92	X	60.19	60.19 m	
10	20	Zoltán Kővágó (HUN)	48.26	X	58.42	58.42 m	
11	21	John Godina (USA)	X	57.19	X	57.19 m	
12	23	Andy Bloom (USA)	56.32	X	X	56.32 m	
13	25	Marcelo Pugliese (ARG)	X	54.06	52.75	54.06 m	

=== Group B ===
Rank	Overall	Athlete	Attempts			Distance	Note
Rank	Overall	Athlete	1	2	3	Distance	Note
1	1	Lars Riedel (GER)	68.26	—	—	68.26 m	SB
2	3	Virgilijus Alekna (LTU)	65.22	—	—	65.22 m	
3	5	Dmitriy Shevchenko (RUS)	64.55	—	—	64.55 m	
4	7	Roland Varga (HUN)	63.52	61.48	63.49	63.52 m	
5	9	Igor Primc (SLO)	X	62.60	56.57	62.60 m	
6	11	Adam Setliff (USA)	62.25	X	58.16	62.25 m	
7	13	Vladimir Dubrovshchik (BLR)	61.73	X	59.42	61.73 m	
8	16	Aleksander Tammert (EST)	60.87	X	61.04	61.04 m	
9	18	Ionel Oprea (ROM)	60.18	58.57	60.16	60.18 m	
10	19	Michael Lischka (GER)	58.36	59.94	57.16	59.94 m	
11	22	Mario Pestano (ESP)	55.99	X	56.58	56.58 m	
12	24	Rashid Shafi Al-Dosari (QAT)	X	X	54.48	54.48 m	
13	26	Róbert Fazekas (HUN)	X	X	53.73	53.73 m	

== Final ==
Rank	Athlete	Attempts						Distance	Note
Rank	Athlete	1	2	3	4	5	6	Distance	Note
1st place, gold medalist(s)	Lars Riedel (GER)	65.41	67.10	66.74	69.50	69.72	68.36	69.72 m	CR
2nd place, silver medalist(s)	Virgilijus Alekna (LTU)	67.65	X	69.40	X	67.28	X	69.40 m	
3rd place, bronze medalist(s)	Michael Möllenbeck (GER)	67.61	X	65.76	66.60	65.30	64.48	67.61 m	PB
4	Dmitriy Shevchenko (RUS)	63.21	X	66.68	67.16	67.57	65.95	67.57 m	PB
5	Adam Setliff (USA)	66.55	66.49	X	X	X	X	66.55 m	
6	Vasiliy Kaptyukh (BLR)	62.88	65.98	62.93	66.08	66.25	65.08	66.25 m	SB
7	Roland Varga (HUN)	X	58.66	65.86	62.37	64.80	X	65.86 m	PB
8	Frantz Kruger (RSA)	63.61	64.89	X	65.27	62.24	X	65.27 m	
9	Jason Tunks (CAN)	63.79	X	X				63.79 m	
10	Timo Tompuri (FIN)	62.82	59.42	X				62.82 m	
11	Igor Primc (SLO)	62.36	X	62.26				62.36 m	
12	Einar Kristian Tveitå (NOR)	X	58.60	59.11				59.11 m	

== See also ==
- 2002 European Championships
