= Timo Tompuri =

Finnish discus thrower (born 1969)

Timo Antero Tompuri (born 9 June 1969 in Pernå, Finland) is a Finnish discus thrower, who throws for the team Yleisurheilu-Team Sahalahti. Although he was coached by Kari Mattila until 2004, he currently coaches himself. Standing 187 cm tall and weighing in at 120 kg, he is a five-time Finnish champion in discus.

Tompuri started competing in athletics later than most, at the age of 26. He threw the discus more than 60 m for the first time in 1997 and won his first Finnish Championship in the summer of 1998. Tompuri has also won the Finnish Championships in 2000, 2001, 2003 and 2005; placed second in 1999, 2002 and 2004; and placed third in 2006. The current Finnish record in discus (69.62 m) was thrown by Tompuri on 8 July 2001 in Helsingborg, Sweden. He also holds the indoor record for discus (63.44 m), which he threw in Helsinki on 5 March 2000.

In major competitions, he has never made it past the ninth place he achieved at the 2002 European Championships in Athletics.

== Doping ==
Tompuri and shotputter Ville Tiisanoja were caught by the French Customs Authorities in spring 2002 with doping substances (4 ampules of testosterone, 38 tablets of ephedrine, 44 tablets of clenbuterol and 245 tablets of melatonin) in their car when they were returning from training in Spain; they denied all involvement and were let off with a warning even though the Legal Protection Board of Sport in Finland stated in their decision that it was extremely unlikely that someone would have been able to stash doping substances that are abused in their sports events in their luggage by accident or without their knowledge. For this reason, the Legal Protection Board did not find it feasible that Tiisanoja and Tompuri were unaware of the doping substances being in their car.

== Achievements ==
Year	Competition	Venue	Position	Notes
Representing Finland
1998	European Championships	Budapest, Hungary	21st	57.52 m
2001	World Championships	Edmonton, Canada	10th	62.82 m
2002	European Championships	Munich, Germany	9th	61.17 m
