= Subačius Eldership =

Eldership of Lithuania

The Subačius Eldership (Lithuanian: Subačiaus seniūnija) is an eldership of Lithuania, located in the Kupiškis District Municipality. In 2021 its population was 1657.
