= Li Shaojie =

Chinese discus thrower (born 1975)

Medal record

Men's athletics

Representing China

Asian Games
Gold medal – first place	1998 Bangkok	Discus throw

Asian Championships
Gold medal – first place	1998 Fukuoka	Discus throw

Li Shaojie (simplified Chinese: 李少杰; traditional Chinese: 李少傑; pinyin: Lǐ Shǎojié; born November 26, 1975) is a male Chinese discus thrower. His personal best throw is 65.16 metres, achieved in May 1996 in Nanjing. This is the current Chinese record.

In 1998 he won the Asian Championships and the Asian Games, and was selected to represent Asia at the 1998 World Cup where he finished seventh. He finished ninth at the 1999 World Championships.

== International competitions ==
Year	Competition	Venue	Position	Notes
Representing China
1994	World Junior Championships	Lisbon, Portugal	5th	55.58 m
1997	East Asian Games	Busan, South Korea	1st	62.58 m
1998	Asian Championships	Fukuoka, Japan	1st	60.28 m
1998	Asian Games	Bangkok, Thailand	1st	64.58 m
1999	World Championships	Seville, Spain	9th	63.22 m
2000	Olympic Games	Sydney, Australia	13th (q)	62.29 m
2001	East Asian Games	Osaka, Japan	1st	60.08 m
