= Igor Primc =

Slovenian discus thrower (born 1966)

Igor Primc (born 8 January 1966 in Novo Mesto) is a male discus thrower from Slovenia. His personal best throw is 64.79 metres, achieved in September 1999 in Novo Mesto.

He finished eleventh at the 2001 World Championships. At the Mediterranean Games he won the gold medal in 1997, the silver in 2005 and finished fifth in 2001. In addition he competed at the World Championships in 1995, 1997 and 1999 as well as the Olympic Games in 1996 and 2004 without qualifying for the final round.

== Achievements ==
Year	Competition	Venue	Position	Notes
Representing Yugoslavia
1983	European Junior Championships	Schwechat, Austria	9th	47.84 m
1985	European Junior Championships	Cottbus, East Germany	12th	47.00 m
Representing Slovenia
1995	World Championships	Gothenburg, Sweden	36th (q)	55.92 m
1996	Olympic Games	Atlanta, United States	24th (q)	59.12 m
1997	Mediterranean Games	Bari, Italy	1st	61.66 m
1997	World Championships	Athens, Greece	21st (q)	59.98 m
1998	European Championships	Budapest, Hungary	16th	58.90 m
2001	World Championships	Edmonton, Canada	11th	62.36 m
2001	Mediterranean Games	Radès, Tunisia	5th	61.26 m
2002	European Championships	Munich, Germany	15th (q)	60.78 m
2004	Olympic Games	Athens, Greece	30th (q)	56.33 m
2005	Mediterranean Games	Almería, Spain	2nd	59.27 m
