= Jaroslav Žitňanský =

Slovak discus thrower

Personal information
- Full name: Jaroslav Žitňanský
- Nationality: Slovakia
- Born: 18 February 1971 (age 55) Piešťany, Trnava, Czechoslovakia
- Height: 1.90 m (6 ft 3 in)
- Weight: 110 kg (243 lb)

Sport
- Sport: Athletics
- Event: Discus throw
- Club: Slávia UK Bratislava

Achievements and titles
- Personal best: Discus throw: 67.20 (2002)

Jaroslav Žitňanský (born February 18, 1971, in Piešťany, Trnava) is a retired Slovak discus thrower. He represented his nation Slovakia in two editions of the Olympic Games (1996 and 2004), and also trained throughout his sporting career as a member of the athletics team for the sport club Slávia UK Bratislava. Zitnansky has established a Slovak record-breaking throw of 67.20 m in the discus at Nacht van Volharding in Beveren, Belgium.

== Career ==
Žitňanský made his official debut at the 1996 Summer Olympics in Atlanta, where he competed as part of the newly formed Slovak team in the men's discus throw. He unleashed the discus into the field with a throw of 51.50 m on his third attempt, finishing thirty-eighth overall in the prelims.

Eight years after competing in his last Olympics, Zitnansky qualified for his second Slovak team, as a 33-year-old, in the men's discus throw at the 2004 Summer Olympics in Athens. Less than two months before the Games, Zitnansky threw the discus of 64.25 m to achieve an Olympic B-standard at the track and field class "A" meet in Vienna, Austria. Unlike his previous Olympic feat, Zitnansky steadily recorded a 53.30-metre throw on his opening attempt in the prelims. Followed by a single foul and a throw slightly shorter than his first by 1.43 m on his next two attempts, Zitnansky finished thirty-sixth in the overall standings against a field of thirty-nine athletes, and did not advance further to the final.
