= John Menton (athlete) =

Irish discus thrower

Personal information
- Full name: John Menton
- Nationality: Irish
- Born: 2 May 1970 (age 56) Dublin, Ireland
- Height: 6 ft 1 in (185 cm)

Sport
- Sport: Athletics
- Event: Discus
- Club: DSD

John Menton (born 2 May 1970) is an Irish athlete. Menton was a solicitor and then Partner in leading Irish law firm Arthur Cox until 2020. He retired from practising law when 50 to concentrate on other interests. He competed in the men's discus throw at the 2000 Summer Olympics.
