= Athletics at the Goodwill Games =

Athletics was one of the sports at the quadrennial Goodwill Games competition. Athletics competitions were held at every one of the five Goodwill Games. The final athletics events were held at the Games in 2001 as the 2005 edition of the Games were cancelled.

== Editions ==
| Games | Year | Host city | Host country |
|---|---|---|---|
| I | 1986 | Moscow | Soviet Union |
| II | 1990 | Seattle, Washington | United States |
| III | 1994 | Saint Petersburg | Russia |
| IV | 1998 | New York City, New York | United States |
| V | 2001 | Brisbane, Queensland | Australia |

== See also ==
- List of Goodwill Games records in athletics
