= Libor Malina =

Czech discus thrower

Libor Malina (born 14 June 1973 in Kladno) is a Czech discus thrower. His personal best throw is 67.13 metres, achieved in July 2001 in Jablonec.

He finished fifth at the 1992 World Junior Championships. He then competed at three World Championships (1997, 1999 and 2003) as well as the 2000 Summer Olympics before reaching an international final, as he finished tenth at the 2004 Summer Olympics.

== Achievements ==
Year	Competition	Venue	Position	Notes
Representing Czechoslovakia
1992	World Junior Championships	Seoul, South Korea	5th	54.06 m
Representing the Czech Republic
1997	World Championships	Seville, Spain	14th (Q2)	58.00 m
1998	European Championships	Budapest, Hungary	10th	60.58 m
1999	World Championships	Seville, Spain	16th	57.18 m
2000	Olympic Games	Sydney, Australia	25th	60.83 m
2002	European Championships	Munich, Germany	14th	60.96 m
2003	World Championships	Paris, France	18th	61.35 m
2004	Olympic Games	Athens, Greece	11th (Q)	62.12 m
2004	Olympic Games	Athens, Greece	10th (F)	58.78 m
2005	World Championships	Helsinki, Finland	13th	62.41 m
2010	European Championships	Barcelona, Spain	16th	53.64 m
