= Adam Setliff =

American discus thrower (born 1969)

Personal information
- Born: December 15, 1969 (age 56) El Dorado, Arkansas, United States

Sport
- Sport: Track and field

Adam Jason Setliff (born December 15, 1969) is an American former discus thrower who represented his native country at two consecutive Summer Olympics (1996 and 2000), finishing 12th and 5th respectively. Born in El Dorado, Arkansas, he set his personal best (69.44 m) in the men's discus throw on July 21, 2001, at a meet in La Jolla, California.

Setliff grew up in Big Horn, Wyoming, where he discovered discus throwing in the sixth grade. When he was a sophomore, his father moved the family to North Platte, Nebraska, where he attended North Platte High School and placed fourth in discus at the 1986 Class A state championships. Setliff also played basketball and tennis at North Platte. He then moved with his mother to Fort Worth, Texas, where he attended Eastern Hills High School and won the District 6-5A title in discus in 1987. Setliff finished at L. D. Bell High School in Hurst, Texas, his fourth of four high schools. As a senior at L. D. Bell in 1988, he won the Class 5A state title in discus and finished as the No.1 prep thrower in the nation, as well as breaking the Texas state record previously held by Michael Carter.

Setliff earned a full scholarship to throw at Rice University, though he dropped out after two years. He met former Olympic weightlifter Mihály Huszka, who trained him for six months. After improving his strength, Setliff contacted University of Washington head track coach Ken Shannon because "Washington was the only school to have two discus throwers in the (nation's) top 20," and Shannon offered him a scholarship. Setliff placed fifth at the 1993 NCAA Outdoor Championships. However, he left Washington 12 units shy of earning his English degree due to an "overwhelming desire to leave Seattle and never see it again."

After college, Setliff trained under Olympic gold medalist Mac Wilkins, and later portrayed Wilkins in the 1998 film Without Limits, which was his first acting experience. He finished third at the 1996 Olympic Trials and second at the 1998 U.S. Championships before missing the 1999 season with injuries, during which time he wrote a screenplay. After returning to action, Setliff had a career best throw of 224' 9" in March 2000 before winning the 2000 Olympic Trials in July to qualify for his second Olympics.

Setliff retired prior to the 2004 season. Currently, he lives in Dallas, Texas and practices real estate law while running a title agency.

== Achievements ==
Year	Competition	Venue	Position	Notes
Representing the United States
1997	IAAF Grand Prix Final	Fukuoka, Japan	2nd	66.12 m
2000	Olympic Games	Sydney, Australia	5th	66.02 m
2001	World Championships	Edmonton, Canada	5th	66.55 m
