= Jo Van Daele =

Belgian discus thrower

Jo Van Daele (born 6 April 1972) is a male discus thrower from Belgium. His personal best throw is 64.24 metres, achieved in May 2001 in Halle.

He finished tenth at the 2002 European Championships. He also competed at the 2000 Summer Olympics and the World Championships in 1997, 2001, 2003 and 2005 without qualifying for the final round.

== Achievements ==
Year	Competition	Venue	Position	Notes
Representing Belgium
1990	World Junior Championships	Plovdiv, Bulgaria	14th (q)	49.12 m
2000	Olympic Games	Sydney, Australia	22nd	60.93 m
2001	World Championships	Edmonton, Canada	17th	60.19 m
2002	European Championships	Munich, Germany	10th	61.07 m
