= Andreas Seelig =

German discus thrower (born 1970)

Andreas Seelig (born July 6, 1970 in Berlin) is a retired discus thrower from Germany. He won the 1989 European Junior Championships and ended up in seventh place at the 1998 European Championships. Seelig also won the men's discus throw event (63.52 m) at the Military World Games in 1999 (Zagreb).

== Achievements ==
Year	Competition	Venue	Position	Notes
Representing East Germany
1988	World Junior Championships	Sudbury, Canada	1st	58.60 m
Representing Germany
1994	European Championships	Helsinki, Finland	10th	59.26 m
1998	European Championships	Budapest, Hungary	7th	63.15 m
