= Aleksander Tammert =

Estonian discus thrower

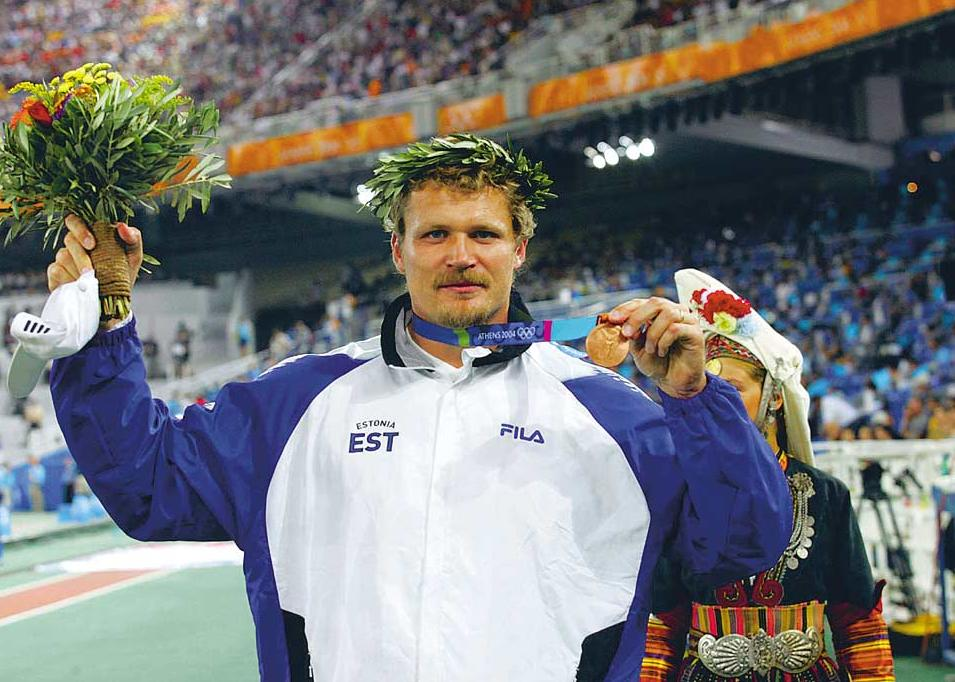

Personal information
- Born: 2 February 1973 (age 53) Tartu, then part of Estonian SSR, Soviet Union
- Height: 1.96 m (6 ft 5 in)
- Weight: 124 kg (273 lb)

Sport
- Country: Estonia
- Sport: Athletics
- Event: Discus
Medal record
Representing Estonia
Olympic Games
Bronze medal – third place	2004 Athens	Discus throw
European Championships
Bronze medal – third place	2006 Gothenburg	Discus throw
Summer Universiade
Gold medal – first place	2001 Beijing	Discus throw
- Updated on 12 August 2012

Aleksander Tammert (born 2 February 1973) is an Estonian discus thrower.

== Athletics career ==
Tammert competed at the 2004 Olympics and originally finishing fourth, but as gold medal winner Róbert Fazekas was disqualified, Tammert received the bronze medal. A month later he placed third at the World Athletics Final.

In 2005 Tammert placed fourth at both the World Championships and the World Athletics Final. Fellow Estonian Gerd Kanter won silver medals at both these events.

In 2006 he placed third at both the European Championships and the World Athletics Final. Kanter again won silver medals at both these events.

His personal best throw is 70.82m (232'3½"), set on 15 April 2006 in Denton, Texas.

== Achievements ==
Year	Tournament	Venue	Result	Mark
1995	World Championships	Gothenburg, Sweden	23rd	58.64
1995	Universiade	Fukuoka, Japan	8th	58.14
1996	Olympic Games	Atlanta, U.S.	25th	59.04
1997	World Championships	Athens, Greece	12th	59.44
1997	Universiade	Sicily, Italy	5th	61.84
1998	European Championships	Budapest, Hungary	20th	57.62
1999	World Championships	Seville, Spain	10th	62.29
1999	Universiade	Palma, Majorca, Spain	4th	61.95
2000	Olympic Games	Sydney, Australia	9th	63.25
2001	World Championships	Edmonton, Canada	16th	61.04
2001	Universiade	Beijing, China	1st	65.19
2002	European Championships	Munich, Germany	5th	64.55
2003	World Championships	Paris, France	7th	64.50
2003	World Athletics Final	Monte Carlo, Monaco	6th	64.02
2004	Olympic Games	Athens, Greece	3rd	66.66
2004	World Athletics Final	Monte Carlo, Monaco	3rd	63.69
2005	World Championships	Helsinki, Finland	4th	64.84
2005	World Athletics Final	Monte Carlo, Monaco	4th	65.22
2006	European Championships	Gothenburg, Sweden	3rd	66.14
2006	World Athletics Final	Stuttgart, Germany	3rd	64.94
2007	World Championships	Osaka, Japan	8th	64.33
2008	Olympic Games	Beijing, China	12th	61.32
2009	World Championships	Berlin, Germany	13th	62.24
2010	European Championships	Barcelona, Spain	18th	60.07
2012	Olympic Games	London, Great Britain	27th	60.20

== Personal ==
Aleksander Tammert is married to Slovenian javelin thrower Elizabeta Randjelovič Tammert with whom he has two daughters.

His father, Aleksander Tammert Sr. (28 April 1947 – 27 October 2006), was a retired shot putter and athletics coach. He won the European Junior Championships in 1966.

Aleksander Tammert is a SMU Mustangs class of 1996.

Summer Olympics
Preceded by Martin Padar	Flagbearer for Estonia; London 2012	Succeeded by Karl-Martin Rammo
