= Glen Smith (discus thrower) =

English discus thrower

Personal information
- Nationality: British (English)
- Born: 21 May 1972 (age 53) Birkenhead, Merseyside, England
- Height: 190 cm (6 ft 3 in)
- Weight: 110 kg (243 lb)

Sport
- Sport: Athletics
- Event: Discus throw
- Club: Solihull & Small Heath AC; Birchfield Harriers

Glen Ernest Smith (born 21 May 1972) is a male retired discus thrower from England who competed at the 1996 Summer Olympics and the 2000 Summer Olympics.

== Biography ==
In addition to his two Olympic appearances, Smith was a two-time competitor at the World Championships in Athletics (1997 and 1999).

He represented England, at the 1994 Commonwealth Games in Victoria, Canada. and represented England, at the 1998 Commonwealth Games in Kuala Lumpur, Malaysia. A third consecutive appearance at the Games ensued at the 2002 Commonwealth Games.

Smith became British discus throw champion after winning the British AAA Championships title at the 2001 AAA Championships. He was also the runner-up on five occasions.

His personal best throw is 65.11 metres, achieved in July 1999 in Barking. This places him third among English discus throwers, behind Perriss Wilkins and Richard Slaney.

== International competitions ==
| Year | Competition | Venue | Position | Notes |
Representing Great Britain and England
| 1990 | World Junior Championships | Plovdiv, Bulgaria | 17th (q) | 47.68 m |
| 1992 | World Cup | Havana, Cuba | 8th | 53.76 m |
| 1994 | Commonwealth Games | Victoria, Canada | 6th | 55.84 m |
| 1996 | Olympic Games | Atlanta, United States | 36th (q) | 54.88 m |
| 1998 | Commonwealth Games | Kuala Lumpur, Malaysia | 4th | 60.49 m |
| 1998 | European Championships | Budapest, Hungary | 15th (q) | 58.97 m |
| 2000 | Olympic Games | Sydney, Australia | 38th (q) | 56.22 m |
| 2002 | Commonwealth Games | Manchester, United Kingdom | 5th | 57.52 m |
