= Róbert Fazekas =

Hungarian discus thrower

Medal record

Men's athletics

Representing Hungary

European Championships
Gold medal – first place	2002 Munich	Discus throw

Róbert Fazekas (born 18 August 1975 in Szombathely) is a Hungarian discus thrower, who won gold in the 2002 European Championships and silver in the 2003 World Championship. He finished first in the 2004 Summer Olympics, but was later disqualified for failing to provide a drug sample, and the gold medal was awarded to Virgilijus Alekna. Fazekas ranks eighth in all-time longest discus throw distances with a personal best of 71.70m.

== 2004 Athens - Olympic Games ==
After the final, Fazekas provided only 25 millilitres of urine (50 ml short of the minimum amount required), stating he was "in an unstable psychological state and feeling unwell". Observers from the International Olympic Committee warned that this would constitute a doping infraction and advised that he could go with them to the clinic at the Olympic Village, where he could provide a further sample. Fazekas refused the offer. A delegation in his defence stated that he was a deeply religious person who frequently had difficulty producing a sample when under observation. The IOC rejected this and disqualified him from the Olympics.

== 2008 Beijing - Olympic Games ==
After two years ban from international competitions, Fazekas made a relatively good comeback by finishing in eighth position in the discus at the Beijing Olympics.

== Preparation for 2012 London - Olympic Games ==
Two days before the 2012 Summer Olympics Fazekas failed a drugs test, stanazolol has been identified. However officially he was not named but had been eliminated from the Olympic Team. One week later, his B sample was also tested positive, after he openly recognized his test had been failed. Initially he was suspended by the IAAF from athletics competition for 8 years, finally on trial by the Hungarian Anti-Doping Committee on 2 October 2012, the committee's decision declared that Róbert Fazekas did not use any banned performance-enhancing drugs deliberately. Exiguous amount of stanozolol was found in his system by neglect, therefore his first degree sentence was overruled and reduced to a 6-year suspension from competition. In the committee's explanation of their verdict: Róbert Fazekas has proved dependably that his system was exposed by stanozolol by taking a nutritional supplement that is legally available in retail stores. Samples from the exact bottle of the supplement, taken by Róbert Fazekas, and from a randomly bought, sealed bottle of the same brand of supplement were tested in an Austrian accredited laboratory by the Hungarian Anti-Doping Group. The A and the B test from the samples of both the opened and the sealed bottles resulted the same level of stanazolol. The containment of the steroid was not identified the nutritional supplement's ingredients.

== Struggle for 2016 Rio de Janeiro - Olympic Games ==
Meanwhile, in June 2013 Fazekas won the IHGF World Amateur Highland Games Championships in Furstenwalde, Germany. In 2013 he filed a lawsuit against the Canadian company producing the nutritional supplement. As a result of another trial on a civil court started in 2012, his suspension was reduced to 3 years, thus it has been already expired in 2015. Despite he could not compete since the Hungarian Athletics Association disputed the authority of the Hungarian Court arguing a civil court's final decision is not obligatory for the IAAF, thus they appealed to the Supreme Court for the revision and the cession of the execution of the decision, though the Hungarian Anti-Doping Group reinstated Fazekas to their controlling program that is the first step to be able to have a permission for legal competition.

The Hungarian Athletics Association decided not to grant any permission until having the IAAF's official statement. Fazekas asked an accelerated procedure due to 2016 Olympic Games in Rio de Janeiro. Finally the Supreme Court repealed the original sentence explaining the case of doping was a fact, the result of the tests were not debated by the athlete, however not the case of deliberation but only the case negligence holds, nevertheless because of the principle of the zero tolerance the 6-year suspension still remains in action.

Since the WADA's regulation regarding negligence had been moderated Fazekas made an appeal earlier again for decreasing his suspension, the leader of the Hungarian Anti-Doping Group stated in may be only applied until after the legal procedure, thus Fazekas made its appeal again to reduce the earlier suspension to 4 years, so he could be able to compete from 6 July 2016. Finally he summarized: "Despite of the happennings I don't have in mind to finish my career, I feel still enough power in me. Nevertheless, I resigned on the Olympic Games. The events of the past month tried me as much I was not able to prepare properly for such an important event".

== Achievements ==
Year	Competition	Venue	Position	Event	Notes
Representing Hungary
1994	World Junior Championships	Lisbon, Portugal	6th	Discus	53.24 m
1994	World Junior Championships	Lisbon, Portugal	17th (q)	Hammer	57.74 m
1997	European U23 Championships	Turku, Finland	6th	Discus	55.60 m
1998	European Championships	Budapest, Hungary	4th	Discus	65.13 m
1999	World Championships	Seville, Spain	11th	Discus	61.71 m
2000	Olympic Games	Sydney, Australia	16th	Discus	61.76 m
2001	World Championships	Edmonton, Canada	26th	Discus	53.73 m
2002	European Championships	Munich, Germany	1st	Discus	68.83 m
2003	World Championships	Paris, France	2nd	Discus	69.01 m
2003	World Athletics Final	Monte Carlo, Monaco	2nd	Discus	66.08 m
2004	Olympic Games	Athens, Greece	DQ (1st)	Discus	70.93 m
2008	Olympic Games	Beijing, China	8th	Discus	63.43 m
2010	European Championships	Barcelona, Spain	3rd	Discus	66.43 m

== Awards ==
- Hungarian athlete of the Year (1): 2002
