= Vaclavas Kidykas =

Lithuanian discus thrower (born 1961)

Personal information
- Born: 17 October 1961 (age 64) Klaipėda, Soviet Union

Sport
- Sport: Track and field
Medal record
Representing Soviet Union
European Championships
Bronze medal – third place	1986 Stuttgart	Discus throw
Summer Universiade
Silver medal – second place	1985 Kobe	Discus throw
Silver medal – second place	1987 Zagreb	Discus throw

Vaclavas Kidykas (born 17 October 1961) is a retired male discus thrower from Lithuania. He placed third in the men's 1986 European Championships in Athletics in Stuttgart, West Germany with a throw of 65.5 meters and participated in four Olympic competitions. His longest throw, 68.44 meters, was recorded at a June 1988 event in Sochi.

== Achievements ==
Year	Competition	Venue	Position	Notes
Representing Soviet Union
1986	European Championships	Stuttgart, West Germany	3rd	65.50 m
1987	World Championships	Rome, Italy	8th	63.64 m
1988	Olympic Games	Seoul, South Korea	13th	60.88 m
Representing Lithuania
1992	Olympic Games	Barcelona, Spain	15th	59.96 m
1993	World Championships	Stuttgart, Germany	11th	58.62 m
1996	Olympic Games	Atlanta, Georgia	8th	62.78 m
1998	European Championships	Budapest, Hungary	11th	60.21 m
2000	Olympic Games	Sydney, Australia	30th	58.96 m
