= Aleksandr Borichevskiy =

Russian discus thrower

Personal information
- Born: 25 June 1970 (age 56) Murmansk, Soviet Union

Sport
- Sport: Track and field

Aleksandr Yaroslavovich Borichevskiy (Russian: Александр Ярославович Боричевский; born 25 June 1970) is a Russian discus thrower, who is a three-time Russian national champion in the discus event.

He finished eighth at the 1999 World Championships. His personal best throw is 65.08 metres, achieved in May 1999 in Saint Petersburg.

== International competitions ==
Year	Competition	Venue	Position	Notes
Representing Russia
1999	World Championships	Seville, Spain	8th	63.59 m
2000	Olympic Games	Sydney, Australia	15th	61.98 m
2004	Olympic Games	Athens, Greece	25th	58.19 m
