= Michael Möllenbeck =

German discus thrower (1969–2022)

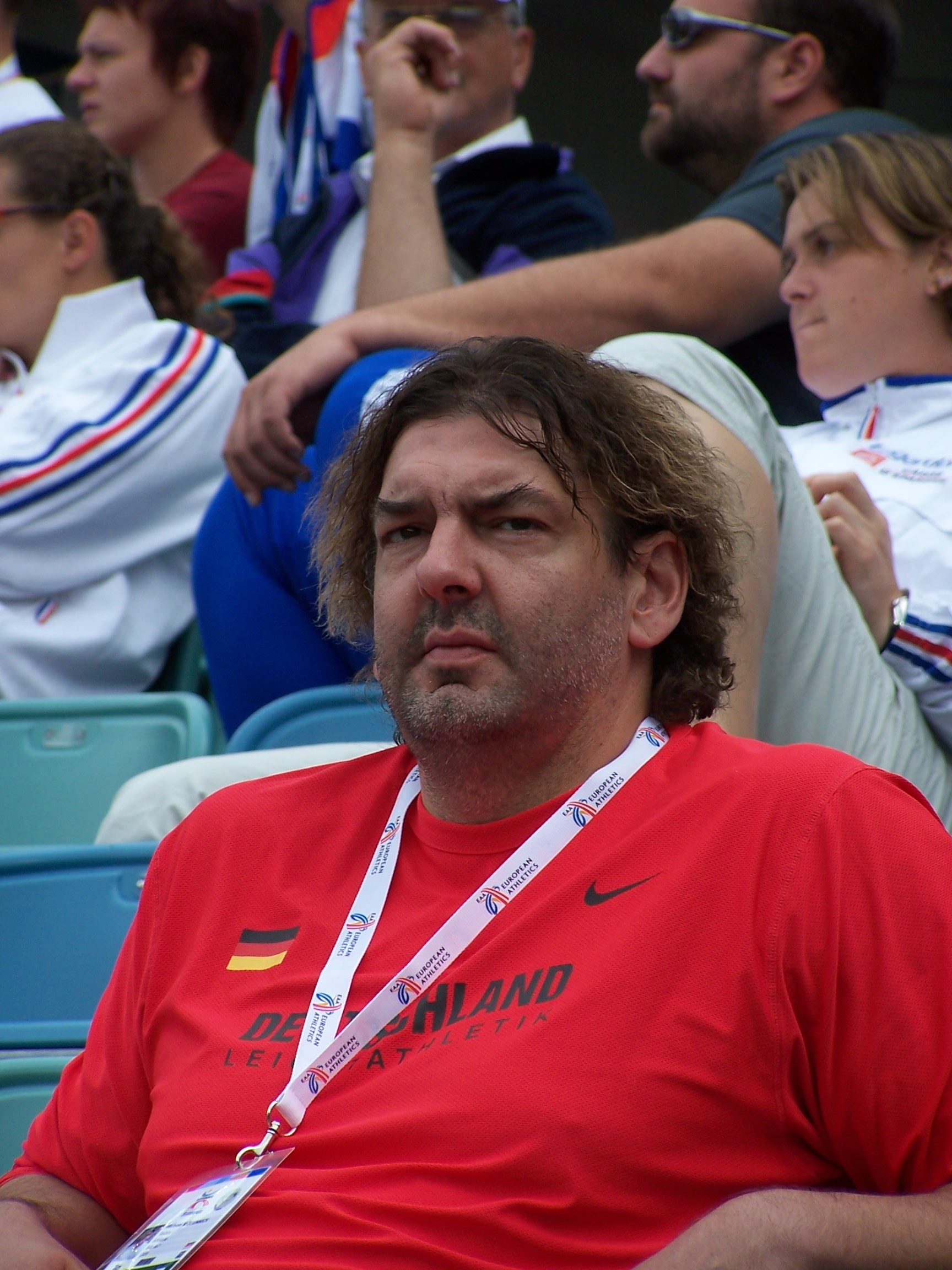
- Möllenbeck in 2006

Personal information
- Full name: Michael Friedrich Möllenbeck
- Nationality: Germany
- Born: 12 December 1969 Wesel, North Rhine-Westphalia, West Germany
- Died: 2 November 2022 (aged 52)
- Height: 2.00 m (6 ft 7 in)
- Weight: 120 kg (265 lb)

Sport
- Country: Germany
- Sport: Athletics
- Event: Discus throw
- Club: Eintracht Frankfurt; SC Magdeburg; TV Wattenscheid 01

Achievements and titles
- Personal best: 67.64 m (2002)
Medal record
Men's athletics
Representing Germany
World Championships
| Bronze medal – third place | 2001 Edmonton | Discus |
| Bronze medal – third place | 2005 Helsinki | Discus |
European Championships
| Bronze medal – third place | 2002 Munich | Discus |

Michael Friedrich Möllenbeck (12 December 1969 – 2 November 2022) was a German discus thrower.

Möllenbeck's greatest achievements were two World Championship bronze medals, and his bronze at the 2005 World Championships was especially welcome as Germany struggled to win medals. His personal best throw was 67.64 metres, achieved in June 2002 in Dortmund. This ranks him seventh among German discus throwers, behind Jürgen Schult, Lars Riedel, Wolfgang Schmidt, Armin Lemme, Hein-Direck Neu and Alwin Wagner.

Möllenbeck married fellow discus thrower Anja Gündler in 1996. He died on 2 November 2022, at the age of 52.

== Achievements ==
| Year | Competition | Venue | Position | Notes |
Representing West Germany
| 1988 | World Junior Championships | Sudbury, Canada | 9th | 49.30 m |
Representing Germany
| 1999 | World Championships | Seville, Spain | 6th | 64.90 m |
| 2000 | Olympic Games | Sydney, Australia | 10th | 63.14 m |
| 2001 | World Championships | Edmonton, Canada | 3rd | 67.61 m |
| 2002 | European Championships | Munich, Germany | 3rd | 66.37 m |
| 2002 | World Cup | Madrid, Spain | 4th | 64.57 m |
| 2003 | World Championships | Paris, France | 5th | 66.23 m |
| 2003 | World Athletics Final | Monte Carlo, Monaco | 5th | 64.36 m |
| 2004 | Olympic Games | Athens, Greece | 20th | 59.79 m |
| 2005 | World Championships | Helsinki, Finland | 3rd | 65.95 m |
| 2005 | World Athletics Final | Monte Carlo, Monaco | 8th | 59.27 m |
| 2006 | European Championships | Gothenburg, Sweden | 5th | 64.82 m |
| 2006 | World Athletics Final | Stuttgart, Germany | 7th | 61.75 m |
