= Vitaliy Sidorov (discus thrower) =

Russian-Ukrainian discus thrower

Personal information
- Born: March 23, 1970 (age 56) Khichauri, Georgian SSR, Soviet Union

Sport
- Sport: Track and field
Medal record
Representing Ukraine
Summer Universiade
Gold medal – first place	1995 Fukuoka	Discus throw

Vitaliy Sidorov (Russian: Виталий Сидоров; born March 23, 1970) is a retired discus thrower, who represented Ukraine (1996) and later Russia (2000) at the Summer Olympics.

He set his personal best (67.90 m) in the men's discus throw on May 3, 1998, at a meet in Kyiv. Sidorov also competed in the men's shot put. Sidorov adopted the Russian nationality on February 12, 2000

== Achievements ==
Year	Competition	Venue	Position	Notes
Representing the Soviet Union
1988	World Junior Championships	Sudbury, Canada	4th	53.00 m
Representing Ukraine
1998	European Championships	Budapest, Hungary	14th	60.34 m
Representing Russia
2000	Olympic Games	Sydney, Australia	25th	60.65 m
