= Vladimir Dubrovshchik =

Belarusian discus thrower

Personal information
- Native name: Уладзімір Уладзіміравіч Дуброўшчык
- Full name: Vladimir Vladimirovich Dubrovshchik
- Nationality: Belarusian
- Born: January 7, 1972 (age 54) Grodno, Byelorussian SSR, Soviet Union
- Height: 1.93 m (6 ft 4 in)
- Weight: 115 kg (254 lb)

Sport
- Country: Belarus (1993-2001)
- Sport: Athletics
- Event: Discus throw

Achievements and titles
- Olympic finals: 1996 Atlanta: Discus throw; Silver
- World finals: 1995 Gothenburg: Discus throw; Silver
- Regional finals: 1994 Helsinki: Discus throw; Gold
- Personal best: 69.28 m (2000)
Medal record
Men's Athletics
Representing Belarus
Olympic Games
Silver medal – second place	1996 Atlanta	Discus
World Championships
Silver medal – second place	1995 Gothenburg	Discus
European Championships
Gold medal – first place	1994 Helsinki	Discus
Universiade
Gold medal – first place	1997 Catania	Discus

Vladimir Vladimirovich Dubrovshchik (Belarusian: Уладзі́мір Уладзі́міравіч Дубро́ўшчык; Russian: Влади́мир Влади́мирович Дубро́вщик; born January 7, 1972, in Grodno) is a Belarusian former discus thrower who won the Olympic silver medal in 1996. He is also the 1994 European champion and 1995 World Championships silver medallist. He finished fourth at the 1997 World Championships. In 2000 he set his personal best throw with 69.28 metres. He retired after the 2001 season.

== Achievements ==
Year	Competition	Venue	Position	Notes
Representing Belarus
1994	European Championships	Helsinki, Finland	1st	64.78 m
1995	World Championships	Gothenburg, Sweden	2nd	65.98 m
1996	Summer Olympics	Atlanta, United States	2nd	66.60 m
1997	World Championships	Athens, Greece	4th	66.12 m
1997	Universiade	Sicily, Italy	1st	66.40 m
1998	European Championships	Budapest, Hungary	6th	63.96 m
1999	World Championships	Seville, Spain	7th	64.00 m
2000	Summer Olympics	Sydney, Australia	7th	65.13 m
2001	World Championships	Edmonton, Canada	13th	61.73 m
