= Andy Bloom =

American shot putter and discus thrower

Personal information
- Full name: Andrew Bloom
- Nationality: American
- Born: August 11, 1973 (age 52) Stamford, Connecticut
- Height: 6 ft 1 in (1.85 m)
- Weight: 275 lb (125 kg)

Sport
- Events: Shot put and discus
- College team: Wake Forest University
- Now coaching: University of California, Davis

Achievements and titles
- Olympic finals: 2000
- World finals: Shot put champion, World University Games (1999)
- National finals: NCAA shot put champion (1996); NCAA discus champion (1996); US shot put champion (indoors; 1999 & 2000)
- Personal bests: Shot Put: 21.82/71-7.25 (2000); Discus: 67.46/221-4 (1999)
Medal record
Men's athletics
Representing the United States
Summer Universiade
Gold medal – first place	1999 Palma de Majorca	Shot put
Silver medal – second place	1997 Sicily	Discus
Silver medal – second place	1999 Palma de Majorca	Discus
Goodwill Games
Silver medal – second place	1998 New York	Discus

Andrew Bloom (born August 11, 1973) is an American former Olympic shot putter, two-time national indoor shot put champion, World University Games shot put champion, and NCAA champion in both discus and shot put.

== Early and personal life ==
Bloom is Jewish, and was born in Stamford, Connecticut. He later lived in Niskayuna, New York, where he attended Niskayuna High School, graduating in 1991. While there, he set a New York State high school discus throw record in 1991, with a distance of 202 feet, 9 inches.

He earned a master's degree in mathematics education from Wake Forest University in 1998. He is married, and lives in Vacaville, California. He currently teaches mathematics at Ohlone College in Fremont, CA.

== Shot put and discus career ==
Bloom attended Wake Forest University as an undergraduate, graduating in 1996. At Wake Forest, he earned All-Atlantic Coast Conference honors each year. As a senior, he won both the NCAA shot put (65–0.5; personal record) and discus (211–1) championships. He became the eighth male in NCAA history to win that double.

Bloom won a silver medal in the discus at the 1997 World University Games, and was ranked third in the US in the discus in 1997. In 1998, he won a silver medal in discus (209–10) at the 1998 Goodwill Games, and was third in shot put (66–11.25 PR) at the USA Indoors and third in discus (217–11 PR) at the USA Outdoors.

In 1999, he won a gold medal in the shot and a silver medal in discus at the 1999 World University Games. He was also fourth in shot put at the World Outdoor Championships in 1999 (20.95 m). He won the shot put at the USA Indoor Championships in 1999 and 2000, with a personal record throw of 70–10.5 in the latter. He was ranked fifth in the world in both shot put and discus in 1999, and third in the US in shot put and second in discus.

Bloom made the US Olympic team in 2000, with a throw of 70–10.75. He placed fourth at the Sydney 2000 Olympic Games, with a throw of 68–5.75 (20.87 m). He finished 2000 ranked second in the world, and with a season-best mark of 71–7.25.

He was honored by the US Jewish Sports Hall of Fame in 2001.

== Coaching career ==
He serves as Assistant Coach at the University of California, Davis. He is also the strength and conditioning coach for the UC Davis athletics program.
