= Leonid Cherevko =

Belarusian discus thrower

Personal information
- Born: 21 April 1974 (age 52) Minsk, Soviet Union

Sport
- Sport: Track and field
Medal record
Representing Belarus
Summer Universiade
Silver medal – second place	2001 Beijing	Discus throw

Leonid Cherevko (Belarusian: Леанід Чараўко; born 21 April 1974) is a Belarusian discus thrower. His personal best throw is 65.56 metres, achieved in 2000.

He won a silver medal at the 2001 Summer Universiade in Beijing, finished eighth at the 2002 European Championships in Munich and twelfth at the 2003 World Championships in Paris. He also competed in the 2000 and 2004 Summer Olympics, but failed to qualify from his pool.

== Achievements ==
Year	Competition	Venue	Position	Notes
Representing Belarus
1998	European Championships	Budapest, Hungary	12th	59.13 m
2000	Olympic Games	Sydney, Australia	33rd	58.32 m
2001	Summer Universiade	Beijing, PR China	2nd	63.15 m
2002	European Championships	Munich, Germany	8th	61.72 m
2003	World Championships	Paris, France	12th	61.90 m
2004	Olympic Games	Athens, Greece	27th	57.98 m
