= Virgilijus Alekna =

Lithuanian discus thrower and politician

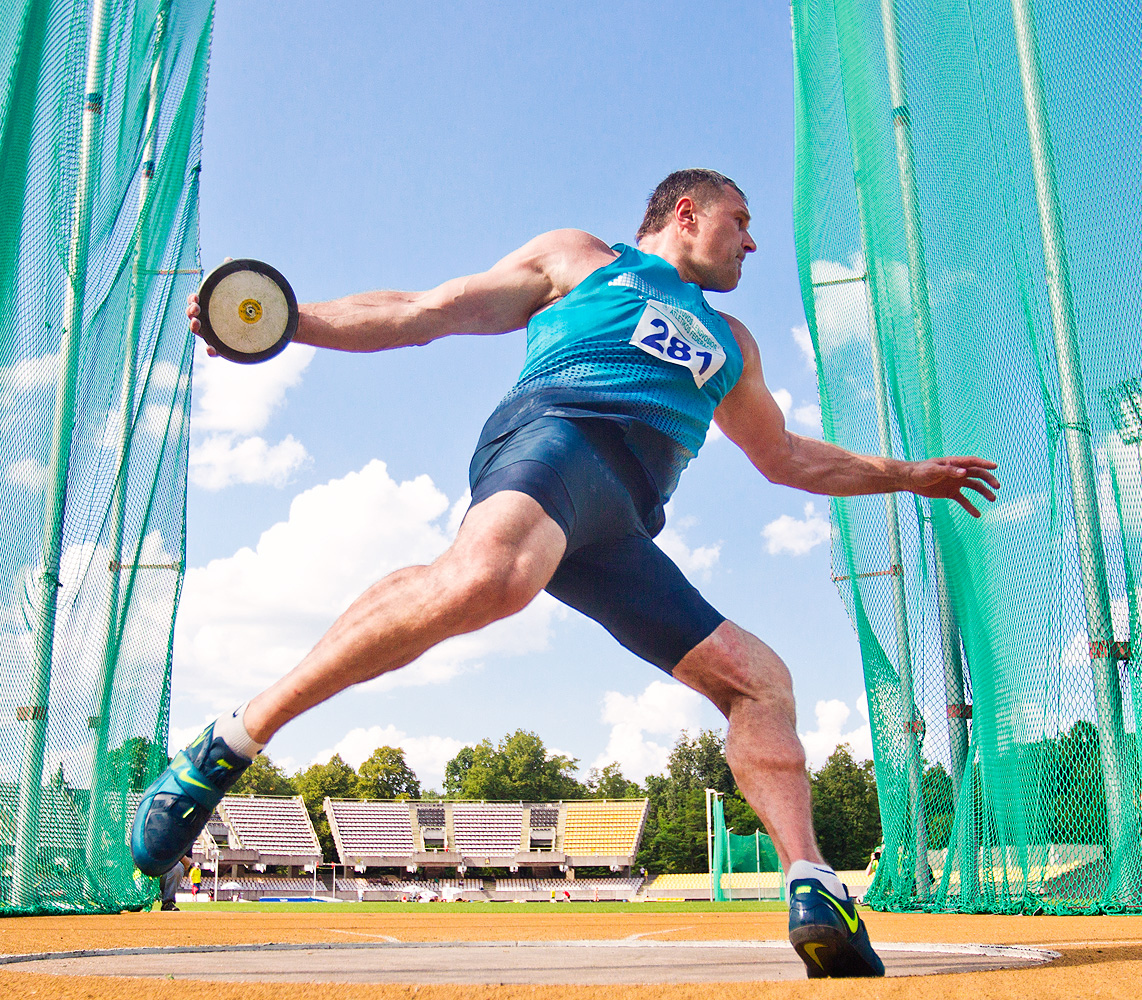
- Virgilijus Alekna at 2014 Lithuanian Championships in Athletics

Personal information
- Nationality: Lithuanian
- Born: 13 February 1972 (age 54) Terpeikiai, then part of Lithuanian SSR, Soviet Union
- Height: 2.01 m (6 ft 7 in)
- Weight: 130 kg (287 lb)

Member of the Seimas
- Incumbent
- Assumed office 14 November 2016
- Constituency: Multi-member

Sport
- Sport: Athletics
- Event: Discus throw

Achievements and titles
- Personal best: 73.88 m (2000)
Medal record
Event	1st	2nd	3rd
Olympic Games	2	0	1
World Championships	2	2	0
European Championships	1	1	1
Continental Cup	4	1	0
IAAF Grand Prix Final	1	1	0
IAAF World Cup	2	0	0
European Throwing Cup	0	1	0
Goodwill Games	0	0	1
Total	12	6	3
Olympic Games
Gold medal – first place	2000 Sydney	Discus
Gold medal – first place	2004 Athens	Discus
Bronze medal – third place	2008 Beijing	Discus
World Championships
Gold medal – first place	2003 Paris	Discus
Gold medal – first place	2005 Helsinki	Discus
Silver medal – second place	1997 Athens	Discus
Silver medal – second place	2001 Edmonton	Discus
European Championships
Gold medal – first place	2006 Gothenburg	Discus
Silver medal – second place	2002 Munich	Discus
Bronze medal – third place	1998 Budapest	Discus
IAAF World Athletics Final
Gold medal – first place	2003 Monte Carlo	Discus
Gold medal – first place	2005 Monte Carlo	Discus
Gold medal – first place	2006 Stuttgart	Discus
Gold medal – first place	2009 Thessaloniki	Discus
Silver medal – second place	2007 Stuttgart	Discus
IAAF Grand Prix Final
Gold medal – first place	2001 Melbourne	Discus
Silver medal – second place	1999 Munich	Discus
IAAF World Cup
Gold medal – first place	1998 Johannesburg	Discus
Gold medal – first place	2006 Athens	Discus
European Throwing Cup
Silver medal – second place	2013 Castellón	Discus
Goodwill Games
Bronze medal – third place	2001 Brisbane	Discus
- Updated on 12 August 2012

Virgilijus Alekna (Lithuanian pronunciation: [vʲɪrʲˈɡʲɪlʲɪjʊs ɐlʲɛkˈnɐ]; 13 February 1972) is a Lithuanian former discus thrower and politician. He won medals at the 2000, 2004 and 2008 Olympics, including two golds.

After retiring from athletics, Alekna was elected to the national parliament, the Seimas, in 2016.

He has three children – Martynas Alekna, the discus world record holder Mykolas Alekna, and Gabrielė Aleknaite.

== Athletics career ==
Alekna has won two gold medals in the Summer Olympics in the discus throw, the first was in 2000 and the second in 2004. He also won the bronze medal for the same event at the Beijing 2008 Olympics. In 2007, he was appointed as UNESCO Champion for Sport.

Alekna's personal record is 73.88 m (242 ft 4 1/2 in), surpassed only by the former world record of 74.08 meters, set by Jürgen Schult in 1986, and his son Mykolas's current world record of 74.35 meters, achieved in 2024. His 20-year Olympic record of 69.89 meters, set in Athens 2004, was broken twice at the Paris 2024 Olympics — first by his son Mykolas with a throw of 69.97 meters, and then by Rojé Stona with a throw of 70.0 meters.

== Major performances ==
Performance in major competitions
Year	Competition	Place	Distance (meters)
1994	European Championship	17	56.38
1995	World Championship	19	59.20
1996	Summer Olympics	5	65.30
1997	World Championship	2	66.70
1998	European Championship	3	66.46
1999	World Championship	4	67.53
2000	Lithuanian Athletics Championships	1	73.88 (NR)
2000	Summer Olympics	1	69.30
2001	World Championship	2	69.40
2002	European Championship	2	66.62
2003	World Championship	1	69.69
2003	World Athletics Final	1	68.30
2004	Summer Olympics	1	69.89 (OR)
2004	World Athletics Final	4	63.64
2005	World Championship	1	70.17
2005	World Athletics Final	1	67.64
2006	European Championship	1	68.67
2006	World Athletics Final	1	68.63
2007	World Championship	4	65.24
2007	World Athletics Final	2	65.94
2008	Summer Olympics	3	67.79
2008	World Athletics Final	8	61.03
2009	World Championship	4	66.36
2009	World Athletics Final	1	67.63
2010	European Championship	5	64.64
2011	World Championship	6	64.09
2012	Summer Olympics	4	67.38
2013	World Championship	16	61.91
2014	European Championship	21	59.35

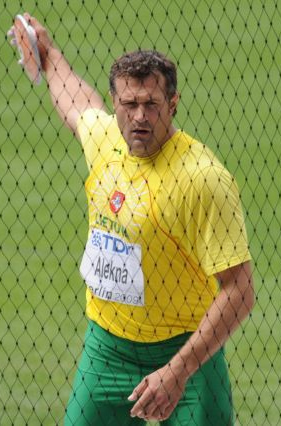
Alekna at his eighth World Championships in 2009, Berlin.

== Honors ==
Alekna was awarded the title of the Athlete of the Year for 2000 by Track and Field News. He was also awarded the Order of the Lithuanian Grand Duke Gediminas by the government of Lithuania. He became the Lithuanian Sportsman of the Year 4 times (2000, 2004, 2005, and 2006). Since 1995 Alekna has served as a bodyguard of the Lithuanian Prime Minister. In 2017 Alekna was awarded the European Athletics Lifetime Achievement award.

== Personal life ==
He is married to former long jumper Kristina Sablovskytė-Aleknienė and has two sons named Martynas and Mykolas, also discus throwers.

== Physiology ==
At a height of 2.02 m (6 ft 7 1/2 in), Alekna has an unusually long armspan, measured 2.24 m (7 ft 4 in), which is helpful in discus throwing. He can make fingerprints on windows of two opposite sides of a bus simultaneously.

During the 2007 World Championship Virgilijus Alekna competed with an injury. Having sustained the injury on 20 August, he competed in the World Championship's qualification on 28 August and, as a result, suffered a defeat, which broke his 37 victories in a row over the past two years.

== Political career ==
In May 2016, Alekna announced he would participate in the elections to the Seimas the following October on the electoral list of the opposition Liberal Movement, without joining the party. He lost the run-off in Naujamiestis single-member constituency, but was elected to the Twelfth Seimas through the electoral list of the party, where he was rated second.

Awards
Preceded by (Morocco) Hicham El Guerrouj	Men's Track & Field Athlete of the Year; 2000	Succeeded by (Morocco) Hicham El Guerrouj
Preceded by (Sweden) Christian Olsson	Men's European Athlete of the Year; 2005	Succeeded by (Portugal) Francis Obikwelu
Preceded by (Lithuania) Edita Pučinskaitė	Best Lithuanian sportsman of the Year; 2000	Succeeded by (Lithuania) Rasa Polikevičiūtė
Preceded by (Lithuania) Šarūnas Jasikevičius	Best Lithuanian sportsman of the Year; 2004, 2005, 2006	Succeeded by (Lithuania) Ramūnas Šiškauskas
Olympic Games
Preceded by Šarūnas Jasikevičius	Flagbearer for Lithuania; London 2012	Succeeded by Gintarė Scheidt
