= Jason Tunks =

Canadian discus thrower (born 1975)

Personal information
- Born: May 7, 1975 (age 51) London, Ontario, Canada
- Spouse: Dianne Tunks

Sport
- Country: Canada
- Sport: Athletics
- Event: Discus Throw
- Retired: 2011

Achievements and titles
- Personal bests: Discus Throw: 67.88m (1998, NR); Outdoor Shotput: 19.06m (1997); Indoor Shotput: 18.97m (2001)
Medal record
Representing Canada
Commonwealth Games
Silver medal – second place	2002 Manchester	Discus throw
Silver medal – second place	2006 Melbourne	Discus throw
Bronze medal – third place	1998 Kuala Lumpur	Discus throw
Pan American Games
Gold medal – first place	2003 Santo Domingo	Discus throw
Bronze medal – third place	1999 Winnipeg	Discus throw

Jason Tunks (born May 7, 1975 in London, Ontario, Canada) is a Canadian former discus thrower who has represented Canada in the Olympics in Atlanta 1996, Sydney 2000 and Athens 2004. He currently holds the Canadian National Record for discus at 67.88 m (222.7 ft).

Competing for the SMU Mustangs track and field team, Tunks won the discus at the 1997 NCAA Division I Outdoor Track and Field Championships.

Tunks was inducted into the London (Ontario) Sports Hall of Fame in 2012, and the Athletics Canada Hall of Fame in 2014.

== Major events ==
Event	Qualification		Final		Ref
Event	Distance	Position	Distance	Position	Ref
Atlanta 1996	55.58m	33rd	Did not advance		
Sydney 2000	64.40	2nd	65.80	6	
Athens 2004	61.21	15	Did not advance		

IAAF World Championships in Athletics

- 1997 World Championships in Athletics at Athens - 9th - 62.30 m (204.40 ft)
- 1999 World Championships in Athletics at Seville - 20th - 60.20 m (197.51 ft)
- 2001 World Championships in Athletics at Edmonton - 9th - 63.79 m (209.28 ft)
- 2003 World Championships in Athletics at Paris - 11th - 62.21 m (204.10 ft)
- 2005 World Championships in Athletics at Helsinki - 8th - 63.77 m (209.22 ft)

Commonwealth Games

- 1998 Commonwealth Games at Kuala Lumpur - 3rd - 62.22 m (204.13 ft)
- 2002 Commonwealth Games at Manchester - 2nd - 62.61 m (205.41 ft)
- 2006 Commonwealth Games at Melbourne - 2nd - 63.07 m (206.92 ft)

Pan American Games

- 1999 Pan American Games at Winnipeg - 3rd - 61.75 m (202.59 ft)
- 2003 Pan American Games at Santo Domingo - 1st - 63.70 m (208.99 ft)

World Cup in Athletics

- 2002 World Cup at Madrid - 5th - 62.89 m (206.33 ft)

Goodwill Games

- 1998 Goodwill Games at Uniondale, New York - 4th - 62.53 m (205.15 ft)
- 2001 Goodwill Games at Brisbane - 7th - 61.70 m (202.43 ft)

== Progression ==
Progression by Active Year (Personal Best is Bold)
Year	Date	Distance
1994	July 14	58.76 m (192.78 ft)
1995	July 1	58.66 m (192.45 ft)
1996	May 18	63.86 m (209.51 ft)
1997	April 12	65.20 m (213.91 ft)
1998	May 14	67.88 m (222.70 ft)
1999	May 13	65.54 m (215.03 ft)
2000	May 6	66.28 m (217.45 ft)
2001	June 9	67.70 m (222.11 ft)
2002	January 28	66.50 m (218.18 ft)
2003	April 26	66.55 m (218.34 ft)
2004	May 19	66.15 m (217.03 ft)
2005	June 11	66.59 m (218.47 ft)
2006	February 25	66.50 m (218.18 ft)
2015	February 21	60.08m (197.36)

== Personal life ==
Tunks is married to Dianne Tunks (née Olson) and they have four children: Brayden, Rylan, Jenna (born 29 Nov 2009) (ranked #2 in the world u18 discus ) and Julia (born 20 July 2006), who is CWG silver medalist .

== See also ==
- Canadian records in track and field
