= 1995 World Championships in Athletics – Men's discus throw =

These are the official results of the Men's Discus Throw event at the 1995 World Championships in Gothenburg, Sweden. There were a total number of 43 participating athletes, with the final held on Friday August 11, 1995.

The winning margin was 2.78 metres which as of 2024 is the greatest winning margin for the men's discus at these championships, the second greatest margin being 2.52 metres from the 1987 championships.

== Medalists ==
Gold	Lars Riedel; Germany (GER)
Silver	Vladimir Dubrovshchik; Belarus (BLR)
Bronze	Vasiliy Kaptyukh; Belarus (BLR)

== Schedule ==
- All times are Central European Time (UTC+1)

Qualification Round
Group A	Group B
09.08.1995 – 09:35h	09.08.1995 – 12:00h
Final Round
11.08.1995 – 17:50h

== Qualification ==
- Held on Wednesday 1995-08-09

RANK	GROUP A	DISTANCE
1.	Dmitriy Shevchenko (RUS)	64.80 m
2.	Vasiliy Kaptyukh (BLR)	62.80 m
3.	Robert Weir (GBR)	62.50 m
4.	Attila Horváth (HUN)	62.36 m
5.	John Godina (USA)	61.70 m
6.	Stefan Fernholm (SWE)	61.10 m
7.	Michael Möllenbeck (GER)	59.76 m
8.	Svein Inge Valvik (NOR)	59.32 m
9.	Ramón Jiménez Gaona (PAR)	59.26 m
10.	Diego Fortuna (ITA)	58.74 m
11.	Vésteinn Hafsteinsson (ISL)	58.12 m
12.	Vaclavas Kidykas (LTU)	57.96 m
13.	Vadim Popov (UZB)	57.84 m
14.	Werner Reiterer (AUS)	57.60 m
15.	Roberto Moya (CUB)	57.58 m
16.	Mickaël Conjungo (CAF)	57.36 m
17.	Kristian Pettersson (SWE)	57.34 m
18.	Vitaliy Sidorov (UKR)	56.82 m
19.	Igor Primc (SLO)	55.92 m
20.	Jan Cordius (DEN)	54.00 m
21.	Dashdendev Makhashiri (MGL)	51.04 m
22.	Tuck Yim Wong (SIN)	49.34 m

RANK	GROUP B	DISTANCE
1.	Vladimir Dubrovshchik (BLR)	64.20 m
2.	Lars Riedel (GER)	63.64 m
3.	Jürgen Schult (GER)	61.92 m
4.	Adewale Olukoju (NGR)	61.44 m
5.	Alexis Elizalde (CUB)	61.38 m
6.	Mike Buncic (USA)	61.08 m
7.	Nick Sweeney (IRL)	60.68 m
8.	Costel Grasu (ROM)	60.64 m
9.	Sergey Lyakhov (RUS)	60.50 m
10.	Virgilijus Alekna (LTU)	59.20 m
11.	Volodymyr Zinchenko (UKR)	59.00 m
12.	Viktor Baraznovskiy (BLR)	58.68 m
13.	Aleksander Tammert (EST)	58.64 m
14.	Dag Solhaug (SWE)	58.52 m
15.	Randy Heisler (USA)	58.10 m
16.	Olav Jenssen (NOR)	58.00 m
17.	David Martínez (ESP)	57.34 m
18.	Harri Uurainen (FIN)	55.12 m
19.	Sergey Lukashok (ISR)	54.90 m
20.	Frits Potgieter (RSA)	54.84 m
21.	Dragan Mustapić (CRO)	53.54 m

== Final ==
RANK	FINAL	DISTANCE
	Lars Riedel (GER)	68.76 m
	Vladimir Dubrovshchik (BLR)	65.98 m
	Vasiliy Kaptyukh (BLR)	65.88 m
4.	Attila Horváth (HUN)	65.72 m
5.	Jürgen Schult (GER)	64.44 m
6.	Adewale Olukoju (NGR)	63.66 m
7.	Alexis Elizalde (CUB)	63.28 m
8.	Dmitriy Shevchenko (RUS)	63.18 m
9.	Robert Weir (GBR)	63.14 m
10.	John Godina (USA)	60.84 m
11.	Mike Buncic (USA)	60.24 m
12.	Stefan Fernholm (SWE)	59.52 m

== See also ==
- 1994 Men's European Championships Discus Throw
- 1996 Men's Olympic Discus Throw
