= Athletics at the 1992 Summer Olympics – Men's discus throw =

Men's discus throw at the Games of the XXV Olympiad
- Pictogram for athletics
- Venues: Estadi Olímpic Lluís Companys
- Dates: August 3 (qualifying); August 5 (final)
- Competitors: 32 from 24 nations
- Winning distance: 65.12

Medalists
| 1st place, gold medalist(s) | | Romas Ubartas; Lithuania |
| 2nd place, silver medalist(s) | | Jürgen Schult; Germany |
| 3rd place, bronze medalist(s) | | Roberto Moya; Cuba |

Official Video Highlights @ 2:40

The final of the men's discus throw event at the 1992 Summer Olympics in Barcelona, Spain was held on August 5, 1992. There were 32 participating athletes from 24 nations. The maximum number of athletes per nation had been set at 3 since the 1930 Olympic Congress. The top 12 and ties, and all those reaching 63.00 metres advanced to the final. The event was won by Romas Ubartas of Lithuania, a victory for the nation in its debut appearance in the men's discus throw. Jürgen Schult took silver, the first medal for unified Germany. Roberto Moya earned Cuba's first men's discus throw medal since 1980 with his bronze. Ubartas and Schult became the 11th and 12th men to win multiple discus throw medals; they had both represented different nations (the Soviet Union and East Germany, respectively, in 1988 and had finished one-two then as well, though in the opposite order.

== Background ==
This was the 22nd appearance of the event, which is one of 12 athletics events to have been held at every Summer Olympics. The returning finalists from the 1988 Games were gold medalist Jürgen Schult of East Germany (now united Germany), silver medalist Romas Ubartas of the Soviet Union (now representing Lithuania), tenth-place finisher Mike Buncic of the United States, and twelfth-place finisher Imrich Bugár of Czechoslovakia. Ubartas had been the "top thrower in 1991" but "refused to compete at the 1991 Worlds for the Soviet Union"; with Lithuania sending its own team (not part of the Unified Team of ex-Soviet republics), he competed again. Schult was a strong contender to repeat, as was Lars Riedel, who won the 1991 world championship.

Bosnia and Herzegovina, the Central African Republic, the People's Republic of China, and Lithuania each made their debut in the men's discus throw; some former Soviet republics competed as the Unified Team. The United States made its 21st appearance, most of any nation, having missed only the boycotted 1980 Games.

== Competition format ==
The competition used the two-round format introduced in 1936, with the qualifying round completely separate from the divided final. In qualifying, each athlete received three attempts; those recording a mark of at least 63.00 metres advanced to the final. If fewer than 12 athletes achieved that distance, the top 12 would advance. The results of the qualifying round were then ignored. Finalists received three throws each, with the top eight competitors receiving an additional three attempts. The best distance among those six throws counted.

== Records ==
Prior to the competition, the existing world and Olympic records were as follows.

| World record | Jürgen Schult (GDR) | 74.08 | Neubrandenburg, East Germany | 6 June 1986 |
| Olympic record | Jürgen Schult (GDR) | 68.82 | Seoul, South Korea | 1 October 1988 |

No new world or Olympic records were set during the competition.

== Schedule ==
All times are Central European Summer Time (UTC+2)

| Date | Time | Round |
|---|---|---|
| Monday, 3 August 1992 | 9:30 | Qualifying |
| Wednesday, 5 August 1992 | 19:30 | Final |

== Results ==
=== Qualifying ===
| Rank | Athlete | Nation | 1 | 2 | 3 | Distance | Notes |
|---|---|---|---|---|---|---|---|
| 1 | Romas Ubartas | Lithuania | 66.08 | — | — | 66.08 | Q |
| 2 | Jürgen Schult | Germany | 61.04 | 63.46 | — | 63.46 | Q |
| 3 | Costel Grasu | Romania | 61.30 | X | 63.03 | 63.03 | Q |
| 4 | Attila Horváth | Hungary | 62.26 | 59.98 | 58.30 | 62.26 | |
| 5 | Werner Reiterer | Australia | 60.64 | X | 62.20 | 62.20 | q |
| 6 | Anthony Washington | United States | 58.18 | 57.86 | 62.18 | 62.18 | q |
| 7 | Roberto Moya | Cuba | X | 62.06 | 61.44 | 62.06 | q |
| 8 | Dmitriy Kovtsun | Unified Team | 60.88 | 61.62 | 61.14 | 61.62 | |
| 9 | David Martínez | Spain | 61.22 | X | X | 61.22 | |
| 10 | Juan Martínez Brito | Cuba | 56.00 | 60.34 | 59.70 | 60.34 | |
| 11 | Dmitriy Shevchenko | Unified Team | 57.20 | 60.22 | X | 60.22 | |
| 12 | Vesteinn Hafsteinsson | Iceland | 60.20 | 58.64 | 58.08 | 60.20 | q |
| 13 | Olav Jenssen | Norway | 60.00 | 59.74 | X | 60.00 | |
| 14 | Lars Riedel | Germany | 57.54 | X | 59.98 | 59.98 | |
| 15 | Vaclavas Kidykas | Lithuania | X | 59.10 | 59.96 | 59.96 | |
| 16 | Ramón Jiménez Gaona | Paraguay | 56.98 | X | 59.78 | 59.78 | |
| 17 | Wenge Yu | China | 58.92 | X | 59.42 | 59.42 | |
| 18 | Mike Buncic | United States | X | 57.84 | 59.12 | 59.12 | |
| 19 | József Ficsor | Hungary | 56.30 | 58.84 | X | 58.84 | |
| 20 | Imrich Bugár | Czechoslovakia | 53.88 | 58.70 | 56.84 | 58.70 | |
| 21 | Ray Lazdins | Canada | X | 55.60 | 58.26 | 58.26 | |
| 22 | Nikolay Kolev | Bulgaria | 50.94 | 58.12 | X | 58.12 | |
| 23 | Nick Sweeney | Ireland | 57.68 | 57.26 | 56.22 | 57.68 | |
| 24 | Mickaël Conjungo | Central African Republic | 57.46 | X | 54.40 | 57.46 | |
| 25 | Brian Blutreich | United States | 57.08 | 54.44 | 55.40 | 57.08 | |
| 26 | Volodymyr Zinchenko | Unified Team | 56.94 | 56.64 | 56.46 | 56.94 | |
| 27 | Christian Erb | Switzerland | X | 55.16 | 54.38 | 55.16 | |
| 28 | Simon Williams | Great Britain | X | 53.12 | 52.96 | 53.12 | |
| 29 | Dragan Mustapić | Bosnia and Herzegovina | X | 47.88 | 48.80 | 48.80 | |
| 30 | Khaled Al-Khalidi | Saudi Arabia | X | X | 47.96 | 47.96 | |
| 31 | Herbert Rodríguez | El Salvador | 43.22 | X | 40.76 | 43.22 | |
| — | Luciano Zerbini | Italy | X | X | X | No mark | |

=== Final ===
| Rank | Athlete | Nation | 1 | 2 | 3 | 4 | 5 | 6 | Distance |
|---|---|---|---|---|---|---|---|---|---|
| 1st place, gold medalist(s) | Romas Ubartas | Lithuania | 60.90 | 62.64 | 64.36 | X | 65.12 | X | 65.12 |
| 2nd place, silver medalist(s) | Jürgen Schult | Germany | 64.26 | 63.54 | 63.84 | 63.38 | 64.94 | 63.08 | 64.94 |
| 3rd place, bronze medalist(s) | Roberto Moya | Cuba | 64.12 | X | X | 62.72 | X | 62.02 | 64.12 |
| 4 | Costel Grasu | Romania | 59.90 | 60.50 | 62.18 | 62.86 | 62.40 | X | 62.86 |
| 5 | Attila Horváth | Hungary | 62.50 | 62.72 | 62.82 | X | 62.56 | 62.06 | 62.82 |
| 6 | Juan Martínez Brito | Cuba | 61.72 | 61.30 | 61.86 | 62.64 | 62.10 | X | 62.64 |
| 7 | Dmitriy Kovtsun | Unified Team | X | 60.04 | 60.58 | X | 60.66 | 62.04 | 62.04 |
| 8 | Dmitriy Shevchenko | Unified Team | 61.78 | 60.92 | X | X | X | X | 61.78 |
| 9 | David Martínez | Spain | 59.74 | 59.54 | 60.16 | Did not advance | | | 60.16 |
| 10 | Werner Reiterer | Australia | 60.12 | 58.92 | X | Did not advance | | | 60.12 |
| 11 | Vésteinn Hafsteinsson | Iceland | 60.06 | X | 58.90 | Did not advance | | | 60.06 |
| 12 | Anthony Washington | United States | 59.96 | X | 58.76 | Did not advance | | | 59.96 |

== See also ==
- 1990 Men's European Championships Discus Throw
- 1991 Men's World Championship Discus Throw
- 1993 Men's World Championship Discus Throw
- 1994 Men's European Championships Discus Throw
