= 1991 World Championships in Athletics – Men's discus throw =

These are the official results of the Men's Discus Throw event at the 1991 World Championships in Tokyo, Japan. There were a total of 36 participating athletes, with the final held on Tuesday August 27, 1991.

== Medalists ==
Gold	Lars Riedel; Germany (GER)
Silver	Erik de Bruin; Netherlands (NED)
Bronze	Attila Horváth; Hungary (HUN)

== Schedule ==
- All times are Japan Standard Time (UTC+9)

Qualification Round
Group A	Group B
26.08.1991 – 11:40h	26.08.1991 – 11:40h
Final Round
27.08.1991 – 19:00h

== Abbreviations ==
- All results shown are in metres

Q	automatic qualification
q	qualification by rank
DNS	did not start
NM	no mark
WR	world record
AR	area record
NR	national record
PB	personal best
SB	season best

== Qualification ==
- Held on Monday 1991-08-26

RANK	GROUP A	DISTANCE
1.	Lars Riedel (GER)	65.30 m
2.	Attila Horváth (HUN)	64.54 m
3.	Mike Buncic (USA)	63.12 m
4.	Sergey Lyakhov (URS)	63.02 m
5.	Vasiliy Kaptyukh (URS)	62.88 m
6.	Jürgen Schult (GER)	62.56 m
7.	Nikolay Kolev (BUL)	62.40 m
8.	Roberto Moya (CUB)	62.32 m
9.	David Martínez (ESP)	61.14 m
10.	Svein Inge Valvik (NOR)	60.86 m
11.	Simon Williams (GBR)	60.68 m
12.	Vesteinn Hafsteinsson (ISL)	60.12 m
13.	Marcel Tirle (ROM)	59.80 m
14.	Luciano Zerbini (ITA)	58.34 m
15.	Anthony Washington (USA)	58.02 m
16.	Ray Lazdins (CAN)	56.58 m
17.	Tuck Yim Wong (SIN)	44.26 m
—	Christian Erb (SUI)	DNS

RANK	GROUP B	DISTANCE
1.	Wolfgang Schmidt (GER)	65.18 m
2.	Dmitriy Shevchenko (URS)	63.70 m
3.	Erik de Bruin (NED)	63.34 m
4.	Adewale Olukoju (NGR)	62.36 m
5.	Imrich Bugár (TCH)	61.90 m
6.	Werner Reiterer (AUS)	60.40 m
7.	Marco Martino (ITA)	60.34 m
8.	Georgi Georgiev (BUL)	60.08 m
9.	Ramón Jiménez Gaona (PAR)	60.02 m
10.	Costel Grasu (ROM)	60.00 m
11.	József Ficsór (HUN)	59.98 m
11.	Juan Martínez (CUB)	59.98 m
13.	Mike Gravelle (USA)	58.28 m
14.	Kamen Dimitrov (BUL)	57.72 m
15.	Igor Avrunin (ISR)	56.74 m
16.	Mickaël Conjungo (CAF)	53.02 m
17.	Herbert Rodríguez (ESA)	46.62 m
—	Stefan Fernholm (SWE)	DNS

== Final ==
RANK	FINAL	DISTANCE
	Lars Riedel (GER)	66.20 m
	Erik de Bruin (NED)	65.82 m
	Attila Horváth (HUN)	65.32 m
4.	Wolfgang Schmidt (GER)	64.76 m
5.	Mike Buncic (USA)	64.20 m
6.	Jürgen Schult (GER)	63.12 m
7.	Dmitriy Shevchenko (URS)	62.90 m
8.	Roberto Moya (CUB)	61.44 m
9.	Sergey Lyakhov (URS)	61.00 m
10.	Nikolay Kolev (BUL)	60.44 m
11.	Adewale Olukoju (NGR)	59.44 m
—	Vasiliy Kaptyukh (URS)	DNS

== See also ==
- 1990 Men's European Championships Discus Throw
- 1992 Men's Olympic Discus Throw
- 1994 Men's European Championships Discus Throw
