= Athletics at the 1996 Summer Olympics – Men's discus throw =

Men's discus throw at the Games of the XXVI Olympiad
- Pictogram for athletics
- Venues: Centennial Olympic Stadium
- Dates: July 29 (qualifying); July 31 (final)
- Competitors: 40 from 30 nations
- Winning distance: 69.40 OR

Medalists
1st place, gold medalist(s)		Lars Riedel; Germany
2nd place, silver medalist(s)		Vladimir Dubrovshchik; Belarus
3rd place, bronze medalist(s)		Vasiliy Kaptyukh; Belarus

The men's discus throw was an event at the 1996 Summer Olympics in Atlanta, Georgia. There were 40 competitors from 30 nations. The maximum number of athletes per nation had been set at 3 since the 1930 Olympic Congress. The final was held on July 31, 1996. The event was won by Lars Riedel of Germany, the nation's first victory in the men's discus throw (though both East and West Germany had previously won). Belarus won two medals in its debut, with Vladimir Dubrovshchik earning silver and Vasiliy Kaptyukh taking bronze.

== Background ==
This was the 23rd appearance of the event, which is one of 12 athletics events to have been held at every Summer Olympics. The returning finalists from the 1992 Games were silver medalist (and 1988 gold medalist Jürgen Schult of Germany, bronze medalist Roberto Moya of Cuba, fourth-place finisher Costel Grasu of Romania, fifth-place finisher Attila Horváth of Hungary, ninth-place finisher David Martínez of Spain, eleventh-place finisher Vésteinn Hafsteinsson of Iceland, and twelfth-place finisher Anthony Washington of the United States. Lars Riedel of Germany, who had not made the final in 1992, had won the last three world championships (and would win, take third place, and win again in the next three).

Belarus, Croatia, the Czech Republic, Mongolia, Slovakia, Slovenia, Ukraine, and Uzbekistan each made their debut in the men's discus throw. The United States made its 22nd appearance, most of any nation, having missed only the boycotted 1980 Games.

== Competition format ==
The competition used the two-round format introduced in 1936, with the qualifying round completely separate from the divided final. In qualifying, each athlete received three attempts; those recording a mark of at least 62.50 metres advanced to the final. If fewer than 12 athletes achieved that distance, the top 12 would advance. The results of the qualifying round were then ignored. Finalists received three throws each, with the top eight competitors receiving an additional three attempts. The best distance among those six throws counted.

== Records ==
Prior to the competition, the existing world and Olympic records were as follows.

World record	Jürgen Schult (GDR)	74.08	Neubrandenburg, East Germany	6 June 1986
Olympic record	Jürgen Schult (GDR)	68.82	Seoul, South Korea	1 October 1988

Lars Riedel's fifth and sixth throws in the final both exceeded the old record, reaching 69.40 metres and 69.24 metres.

== Schedule ==
All times are Eastern Daylight Time (UTC-4)

Date	Time	Round
Monday, 29 July 1996	9:30	Qualifying
Wednesday, 31 July 1996	19:33	Final

== Results ==
=== Qualifying ===
Rank	Athlete	Nation	1	2	3	Distance	Notes
1	Lars Riedel	Germany	64.66	—	—	64.66	Q
2	Virgilijus Alekna	Lithuania	64.50	—	—	64.50	Q
3	Anthony Washington	United States	63.66	—	—	63.66	Q
4	Vitaliy Sidorov	Ukraine	X	57.60	63.42	63.42	Q
5	Vladimir Dubrovshchik	Belarus	63.22	—	—	63.22	Q
6	Attila Horváth	Hungary	58.94	62.90	—	62.90	Q
7	Vaclavas Kidykas	Lithuania	59.64	62.74	—	62.74	Q
8	Jürgen Schult	Germany	62.58	—	—	62.58	Q
9	Sergey Lyakhov	Russia	59.62	62.42	—	62.42	q
10	Adam Setliff	United States	62.36	58.42	60.06	62.36	q
11	Alexis Elizalde	Cuba	60.98	62.22	61.44	62.22	q
12	Vasiliy Kaptyukh	Belarus	57.28	61.14	62.22	62.22	q
13	Nick Sweeney	Ireland	58.82	62.04	61.06	62.04	
14	John Godina	United States	61.82	59.88	57.46	61.82	
15	Bob Weir	Great Britain	61.64	60.54	X	61.64	
16	Ramón Jiménez Gaona	Paraguay	58.18	61.36	X	61.36	
17	Adewale Olukoju	Nigeria	X	60.98	59.32	60.98	
18	Li Shaojie	China	58.54	60.06	60.20	60.20	
19	Diego Fortuna	Italy	57.78	59.30	60.08	60.08	
20	Marek Bilek	Czech Republic	59.86	58.42	58.62	59.86	
21	Svein Inge Valvik	Norway	59.34	58.34	59.60	59.60	
22	Roberto Moya	Cuba	59.22	57.60	X	59.22	
23	Dashdendev Makhashiri	Mongolia	59.16	54.18	X	59.16	
24	Igor Primc	Slovenia	59.12	56.40	57.62	59.12	
25	Aleksander Tammert	Estonia	58.84	X	59.04	59.04	
26	Costel Grasu	Romania	58.30	X	58.56	58.56	
27	Dragan Mustapić	Croatia	X	57.94	56.62	57.94	
28	Andriy Kokhanovsky	Ukraine	57.90	X	X	57.90	
29	Marcelo Pugliese	Argentina	56.72	X	X	56.72	
30	Shakti Singh	India	53.72	56.58	54.30	56.58	
31	Aleksandr Borichevskiy	Russia	X	56.46	55.18	56.46	
32	Vésteinn Hafsteinsson	Iceland	53.94	52.14	56.30	56.30	
33	Jason Tunks	Canada	X	X	55.58	55.58	
34	Mickaël Conjungo	Central African Republic	X	X	55.34	55.34	
35	Michael Möllenbeck	Germany	X	55.18	55.06	55.18	
36	Glen Smith	Great Britain	54.88	X	X	54.88	
37	Roman Poltoratsky	Uzbekistan	X	X	51.96	51.96	
38	Jaroslav Žitňanský	Slovakia	X	50.94	51.50	51.50	
39	Chris Sua'mene	Western Samoa	49.22	51.28	50.24	51.28	
—	David Martínez	Spain	X	X	X	No mark	

=== Final ===
Rank	Athlete	Nation	1	2	3	4	5	6	Distance	Notes
1st place, gold medalist(s)	Lars Riedel	Germany	X	X	65.40	63.10	69.40 OR	69.24	69.40	OR
2nd place, silver medalist(s)	Vladimir Dubrovshchik	Belarus	64.86	66.60	64.38	59.68	X	X	66.60	
3rd place, bronze medalist(s)	Vasiliy Kaptyukh	Belarus	63.24	64.00	65.80	X	63.82	65.08	65.80	
4	Anthony Washington	United States	65.42	X	X	61.34	X	62.50	65.42	
5	Virgilijus Alekna	Lithuania	62.28	65.30	64.50	X	64.54	63.74	65.30	
6	Jürgen Schult	Germany	62.82	64.42	62.62	64.62	64.38	63.78	64.62	
7	Vitaliy Sidorov	Ukraine	63.44	X	X	62.76	63.78	62.82	63.78	
8	Vaclavas Kidykas	Lithuania	61.48	57.52	62.78	X	61.68	61.88	62.78	
9	Alexis Elizalde	Cuba	60.52	60.36	62.70	Did not advance			62.70	
10	Attila Horváth	Hungary	60.66	62.28	59.72	Did not advance			62.28	
11	Sergey Lyakhov	Russia	60.62	59.90	X	Did not advance			60.62	
12	Adam Setliff	United States	X	56.30	X	Did not advance			56.30	

== See also ==
- 1994 Men's European Championships Discus Throw (Helsinki)
- 1995 Men's World Championships Discus Throw (Gothenburg)
- 1997 Men's World Championships Discus Throw (Athens)
- 1998 Men's European Championships Discus Throw (Budapest)
