= 1993 World Championships in Athletics – Men's discus throw =

These are the official results of the Men's Discus Throw event at the 1993 World Championships in Stuttgart, Germany. There were a total of 31 participating athletes, with the final held on Tuesday August 17, 1993. The qualification mark was set at 63.00 metres.

== Medalists ==
Gold	Lars Riedel; Germany (GER)
Silver	Dmitriy Shevchenko; Russia (RUS)
Bronze	Jürgen Schult; Germany (GER)

== Schedule ==
- All times are Central European Time (UTC+1)

Qualification Round
Group A	Group B
16.08.1993 – 10:00h	16.08.1993 – 11:45h
Final Round
17.08.1993 – 19:20h

== Abbreviations ==
- All results shown are in metres

Q	automatic qualification
q	qualification by rank
DNS	did not start
NM	no mark
WR	world record
AR	area record
NR	national record
PB	personal best
SB	season best

== Qualification ==
- Held on Monday 1993-08-16

RANK	GROUP A	DISTANCE
1.	Romas Ubartas (LTU)	65.92 m
2.	Dmitriy Shevchenko (RUS)	63.68 m
3.	Anthony Washington (USA)	62.78 m
4.	Nick Sweeney (IRL)	62.10 m
5.	Jürgen Schult (GER)	62.10 m
6.	Alexis Elizalde (CUB)	60.76 m
7.	Ramón Jiménez Gaona (PAR)	60.50 m
8.	Vladimir Dubrovshchik (BLR)	60.38 m
9.	Robert Weir (GBR)	59.74 m
10.	Dmitriy Kovtsun (UKR)	58.90 m
11.	Imrich Bugár (CZE)	58.76 m
12.	Mike Gravelle (USA)	56.42 m
13.	Mickaël Conjungo (CAF)	53.60 m
14.	Gordon Barff (TAH)	46.56 m
—	Erik de Bruin (NED)	DNS

RANK	GROUP B	DISTANCE
1.	Lars Riedel (GER)	65.88 m
2.	Mike Buncic (USA)	63.64 m
3.	Vasiliy Kaptyukh (BLR)	62.56 m
4.	Vaclavas Kidykas (LTU)	61.94 m
5.	Luis Delís (CUB)	61.76 m
6.	Volodymyr Zinchenko (UKR)	61.74 m
7.	Costel Grasu (ROM)	61.52 m
8.	Sergey Lukashok (ISR)	60.88 m
9.	Roberto Moya (CUB)	60.10 m
10.	Viktor Baraznovskiy (BLR)	59.30 m
11.	Vesteinn Hafsteinsson (ISL)	58.56 m
12.	Ray Lazdins (CAN)	57.48 m
13.	Dashdendev Makhashiri (MGL)	51.62 m
14.	Shakti Singh (IND)	48.78 m
15.	Tuck Yim Wong (SIN)	46.86 m
16.	Wesley Tuilefano (ASA)	27.34 m

== Final ==
RANK	FINAL	DISTANCE
	Lars Riedel (GER)	67.72 m
	Dmitriy Shevchenko (RUS)	66.90 m
	Jürgen Schult (GER)	66.12 m
4.	Costel Grasu (ROM)	65.24 m
5.	Volodymyr Zinchenko (UKR)	62.02 m
6.	Nick Sweeney (IRL)	61.66 m
7.	Vasiliy Kaptyukh (BLR)	61.64 m
8.	Mike Buncic (USA)	61.06 m
9.	Luis Delís (CUB)	60.76 m
10.	Anthony Washington (USA)	60.72 m
11.	Vaclavas Kidykas (LTU)	58.62 m
—	Romas Ubartas (LTU)	DSQ

== See also ==
- 1992 Men's Olympic Discus Throw
- 1994 Men's European Championships Discus Throw
