= Athletics at the 1989 Summer Universiade – Men's discus throw =

The men's discus throw event at the 1989 Summer Universiade was held at the Wedaustadion in Duisburg on 28 and 29 August 1989.

== Medalists ==
Gold	Silver	Bronze
Kamy Keshmiri; United States	Erik de Bruin; Netherlands	Roberto Moya; Cuba

== Results ==
=== Qualification ===
Rank	Athlete	Nationality	Result	Notes
1	Erik de Bruin	Netherlands	62.54	Q
2	Kamy Keshmiri	United States	59.50	
3	Roberto Moya	Cuba	58.60	
4	Mika Muukka	Finland	57.58	
5	Wulf Brunner	West Germany	57.50	
6	Vaclavas Kidykas	Soviet Union	56.88	
7	Lutz Hager	West Germany	56.80	
8	Andriy Kokhanovsky	Soviet Union	56.76	
9	Dragan Mustapić	Yugoslavia	56.60	
10	Anthony Washington	United States	55.04	
11	João Joaquim dos Santos	Brazil	54.72	
12	Kari Nisula	Finland	54.42	
13	Bo Henriksson	Sweden	53.92	
14	Lars Sundin	Sweden	53.60	
15	Kostas Georgakopoulos	Greece	53.40	
16	Hristos Papadopoulos	Greece	53.14	
17	Pedro Acosta	Cuba	52.22	
18	Luis Lizaso	Spain	48.20	

=== Final ===
Rank	Athlete	Nationality	Result	Notes
1st place, gold medalist(s)	Kamy Keshmiri	United States	65.40	
2nd place, silver medalist(s)	Erik de Bruin	Netherlands	64.40	
3rd place, bronze medalist(s)	Roberto Moya	Cuba	63.78	
4	Wulf Brunner	West Germany	61.82	
5	Anthony Washington	United States	60.84	
6	Vaclavas Kidykas	Soviet Union	60.06	
7	Andriy Kokhanovsky	Soviet Union	58.04	
8	Mika Muukka	Finland	57.63	
9	Dragan Mustapić	Yugoslavia	56.39	
10	Lutz Hager	West Germany	55.50	
11	João Joaquim dos Santos	Brazil	55.42	
12	Kari Nisula	Finland	54.89	
