= Athletics at the 2002 Asian Games – Men's discus throw =

Men's discus throw at the 2002 Asian Games
- Venue: Busan Asiad Main Stadium
- Date: 13 October 2002
- Competitors: 10 from 7 nations

Medalists
gold medal	Wu Tao	China
silver medal	Abbas Samimi	Iran
bronze medal	Anil Kumar	India

The men's discus throw competition at the 2002 Asian Games in Busan, South Korea was held on 13 October at the Busan Asiad Main Stadium.

== Schedule ==
All times are Korea Standard Time (UTC+09:00)

Date	Time	Event
Sunday, 13 October 2002	10:00	Final

== Records ==
Prior to this competition, the existing world, Asian and Games records were as follows.

World Record	Jürgen Schult (GDR)	74.08	Neubrandenburg, East Germany	6 June 1986
Asian Record	Li Shaojie (CHN)	65.16	Nanjing, China	7 May 1996
Games Record	Li Shaojie (CHN)	64.58	Bangkok, Thailand	17 December 1998

== Results ==
Rank	Athlete	Attempt						Result	Notes
Rank	Athlete	1	2	3	4	5	6	Result	Notes
1st place, gold medalist(s)	Wu Tao (CHN)	54.14	55.55	X	X	60.76	X	60.76	
2nd place, silver medalist(s)	Abbas Samimi (IRI)	X	59.55	57.21	X	60.36	60.44	60.44	
3rd place, bronze medalist(s)	Anil Kumar (IND)	X	59.81	57.63	57.86	59.57	X	59.81	
4	Rashid Shafi Al-Dosari (QAT)	59.15	X	X	58.72	58.30	X	59.15	
5	Tulake Nuermaimaiti (CHN)	X	X	53.63	57.88	X	X	57.88	
6	Khalid Habash Al-Suwaidi (QAT)	54.56	55.86	57.78	56.20	55.80	56.53	57.78	
7	Sultan Al-Dawoodi (KSA)	X	55.10	X	57.69	X	52.62	57.69	
8	Abdullah Al-Shammari (KSA)	55.29	56.87	54.78	X	X	54.64	56.87	
9	Shigeo Hatakeyama (JPN)	50.71	52.69	52.44				52.69	
10	Choi Jong-bum (KOR)	49.79	51.29	X				51.29	
