= Athletics at the 1991 Summer Universiade – Men's discus throw =

The men's discus throw event at the 1991 Summer Universiade was held at the Don Valley Stadium in Sheffield on 23 July 1991.

== Results ==
Rank	Athlete	Nationality	#1	#2	#3	#4	#5	#6	Result	Notes
1st place, gold medalist(s)	Adewale Olukoju	Nigeria	57.58	58.82	58.00	57.44	61.48	x	61.48	
2nd place, silver medalist(s)	Anthony Washington	United States	x	55.16	59.94	x	61.46	?	61.46	
3rd place, bronze medalist(s)	Alexis Elizalde	Cuba							59.04	
4	Karsten Kufahl	Germany							58.37	
5	Nicholas Sweeney	Ireland							58.06	
6	Joachim Tidow	Germany							57.23	
7	Brian Blutreich	United States							56.64	
8	Lars Sundt	Norway							56.64	
9	Andriy Kokhanovsky	Soviet Union							56.12	
10	Martti Halmesmäki	Finland							55.02	
11	Heikki Hollmén	Finland							55.02	
12	Simon Williams	Great Britain	51.44	54.34	x				54.34	
13	Dag Solhaug	Sweden							54.02	
14	Darrin Morris	Great Britain	x	53.82	x				53.82	
15	Ottó Benczenleitner	Hungary							52.84	
16	Thomas Rosvold	Norway							51.02	
17	Nikos Anastasiades	Cyprus							47.16	
