= Athletics at the 1987 Summer Universiade – Men's discus throw =

The men's discus throw event at the 1987 Summer Universiade was held at the Stadion Maksimir in Zagreb on 17 July 1987.

== Results ==
Rank	Athlete	Nationality	Result	Notes
1st place, gold medalist(s)	Randy Heisler	United States	62.38	
2nd place, silver medalist(s)	Vaclavas Kidykas	Soviet Union	61.72	
3rd place, bronze medalist(s)	Kostas Georgakopoulos	Greece	60.54	
4	Andrey Kuzyanin	Soviet Union	59.98	
5	Michael Buncic	United States	59.28	
6	Mika Muukka	Finland	56.36	
7	Paul Mardle	Great Britain	56.10	
8	Dragan Mustapić	Yugoslavia	54.80	
9	Liu Chengjiang	China	52.40	
10	Dragan Perić	Yugoslavia	52.20	
11	José Alonso	Guatemala	42.34	
