= Athletics at the 1998 Asian Games – Men's discus throw =

Men's discus throw at the 1998 Asian Games
- Venue: Thammasat Stadium
- Dates: 17 December 1998
- Competitors: 10 from 8 nations

Medalists
gold medal	Li Shaojie	China
silver medal	Anil Kumar	India
bronze medal	Zhang Cunbiao	China

The men's discus throw competition at the 1998 Asian Games in Bangkok, Thailand was held on 17 December at the Thammasat Stadium.

== Schedule ==
All times are Indochina Time (UTC+07:00)

Date	Time	Event
Thursday, 17 December 1998	17:50	Final

== Results ==
Rank	Athlete	Result	Notes
1st place, gold medalist(s)	Li Shaojie (CHN)	64.58	GR
2nd place, silver medalist(s)	Anil Kumar (IND)	58.43	
3rd place, bronze medalist(s)	Zhang Cunbiao (CHN)	57.28	
4	Dashdendeviin Makhashiri (MGL)	56.05	
5	Abbas Samimi (IRI)	54.80	
6	Ajit Bhaduria (IND)	54.03	
7	Sergey Kot (UZB)	53.05	
8	Tareq Al-Najjar (JOR)	51.48	
9	Rashid Shafi Al-Dosari (QAT)	50.37	
10	Wunsawang Sawusdee (THA)	46.93	
