= 2000 Asian Athletics Championships – Men's discus throw =

The men's discus throw event at the 2000 Asian Athletics Championships was held in Jakarta, Indonesia on 31 August.

== Results ==
Rank	Name	Nationality	#1	#2	#3	#4	#5	#6	Result	Notes
1st place, gold medalist(s)	Anil Kumar	India	55.36	54.44	56.62	x	58.23	58.47	58.47	
2nd place, silver medalist(s)	Abbas Samimi	Iran	57.31	58.27	58.09	x	58.00	53.88	58.27	
3rd place, bronze medalist(s)	Hridayanand Singh	India	55.10	56.77	x	54.97	x	56.96	56.96	
4	Rashid Shafi Al-Dosari	Qatar							56.74	
5	Abdullah Al-Shoumari	Saudi Arabia							56.68	
6	Dashdendev Makhashiri	Mongolia							54.96	
7	Khalid Salman Al-Khalidi	Saudi Arabia							54.03	
8	Saber Salem Saeed Baiha	United Arab Emirates							53.11	
9	Tarek Al-Najjar	Jordan							52.67	
10	Wansawang Sawasdee	Thailand							50.32	
11	Kim Young-Chul	South Korea							49.69	
12	Shigeo Hatakeyama	Japan							48.45	
13	Khalid Habash Al-Suwaidi	Qatar							47.18	
14	Dao Dan Tieng	Vietnam							46.63	
15	Nasser Ahmad Mohamed	United Arab Emirates							40.17	
