= 1994 European Athletics Championships – Men's discus throw =

Men's discus throw at the European Athletics Championships

These are the official results of the Men's discus throw event at the 1994 European Championships in Helsinki, Finland, held at Helsinki Olympic Stadium on 12 and 14 August 1994. There were a total number of 21 participating athletes.

== Medalists ==
Gold	Vladimir Dubrovshchik; Belarus
Silver	Dmitriy Shevchenko; Russia
Bronze	Jürgen Schult; Germany

== Qualification ==
- Held on 12 August 1994

Rank	Group A	Distance
1.	Dmitriy Shevchenko (RUS)	62.46 m
2.	Vladimir Dubrovshchik (BLR)	62.00 m
3.	Andreas Seelig (GER)	61.28 m
4.	Nick Sweeney (IRL)	59.34 m
5.	Lars Riedel (GER)	58.66 m
6.	Robert Weir (GBR)	57.18 m
7.	Vésteinn Hafsteinsson (ISL)	57.18 m
8.	Virgilijus Alekna (LTU)	56.38 m
9.	Kristian Pettersson (SWE)	56.38 m
10.	Kari Pekola (FIN)	56.06 m

Rank	Group B	Distance
1.	Sergey Lyakhov (RUS)	62.26 m
2.	Attila Horváth (HUN)	60.96 m
3.	Costel Grasu (ROM)	60.64 m
4.	Jürgen Schult (GER)	60.62 m
5.	Volodymyr Zinchenko (UKR)	60.40 m
6.	Svein Inge Valvik (NOR)	58.50 m
7.	Sergey Lukashok (ISR)	57.78 m
8.	Imrich Bugár (CZE)	56.64 m
9.	Timo Sinervo (FIN)	56.60 m
10.	Diego Fortuna (ITA)	55.70 m
11.	Dag Solhaug (SWE)	54.44 m

== Final ==
- Held on 14 August 1994

Rank	Final	Distance
	Vladimir Dubrovshchik (BLR)	64.78 m
	Dmitriy Shevchenko (RUS)	64.56 m
	Jürgen Schult (GER)	64.18 m
4.	Nick Sweeney (IRL)	63.76 m
5.	Attila Horváth (HUN)	63.60 m
6.	Volodymyr Zinchenko (UKR)	63.60 m
7.	Svein Inge Valvik (NOR)	62.02 m
8.	Costel Grasu (ROM)	61.40 m
9.	Sergey Lyakhov (RUS)	60.80 m
10.	Andreas Seelig (GER)	59.26 m
11.	Sergey Lukashok (ISR)	57.60 m
—	Lars Riedel (GER)	DNS

== Participation ==
According to an unofficial count, 21 athletes from 16 countries participated in the event.

- Belarus (1)
- Czech Republic (1)
- Finland (2)
- Germany (3)
- Hungary (1)
- Iceland (1)
- Ireland (1)
- Israel (1)
- Italy (1)
- Lithuania (1)
- Norway (1)
- Romania (1)
- Russia (2)
- Sweden (2)
- Ukraine (1)
- United Kingdom (1)

== See also ==
- 1992 Men's Olympic Discus Throw (Barcelona)
- 1993 Men's World Championships Discus Throw (Stuttgart)
- 1995 Men's World Championships Discus Throw (Gothenburg)
- 1996 Men's Olympic Discus Throw (Atlanta)
