= Athletics at the 1994 Goodwill Games =

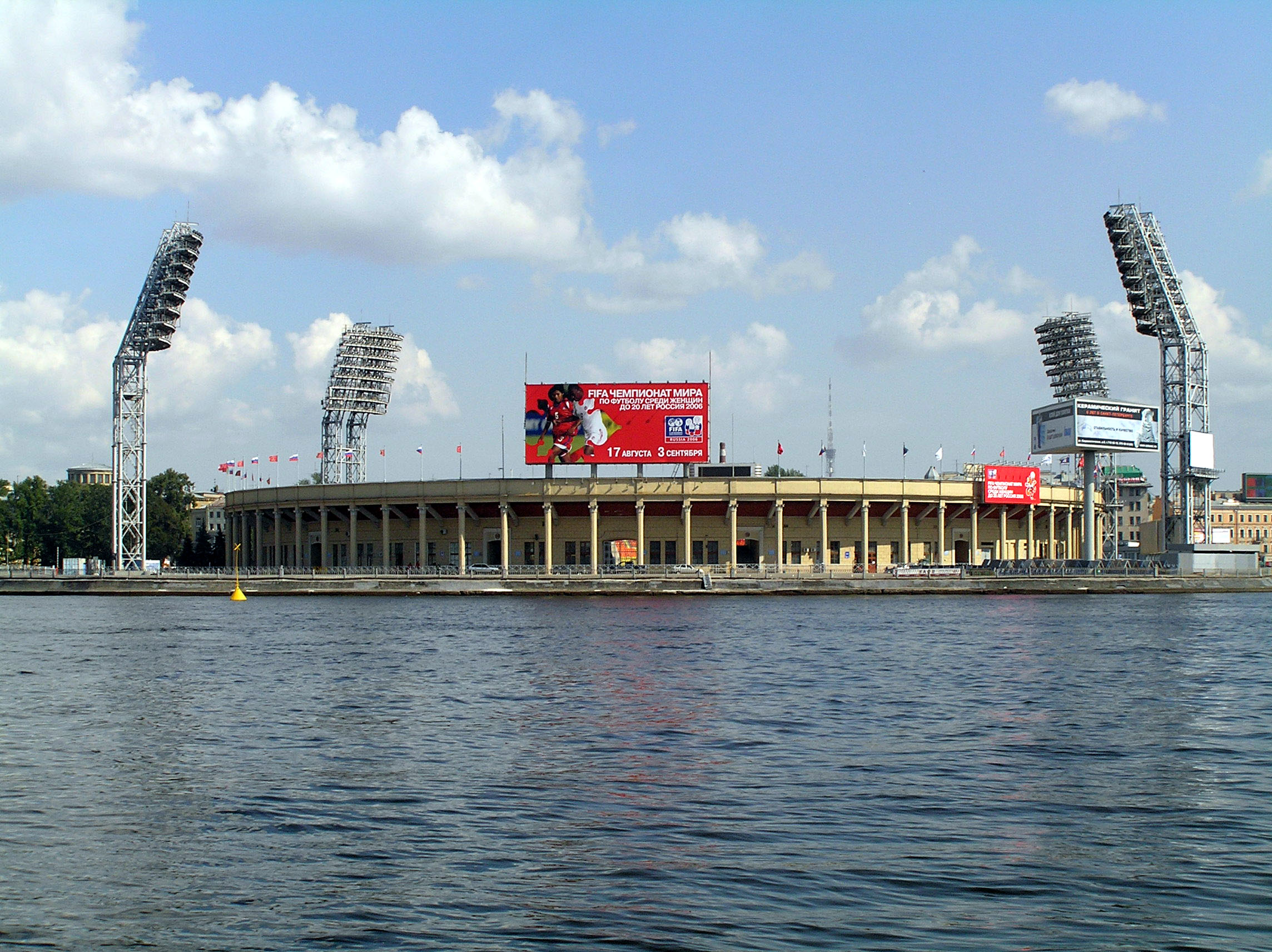
- The 28,000-capacity Petrovsky Stadium provided the venue for the athletics competition.
- Dates: July 1994
- Host city: St. Petersburg, Russia
- Venue: Petrovsky Stadium
- Participation: 372 athletes from 46 nations
- Records set: 1 world record 15 Games records

At the 1994 Goodwill Games, the athletics events were held in July at the Petrovsky Stadium in Saint Petersburg, Russia. A total of 44 events were contested, of which 22 were by male and 22 by female athletes. The marathon event was dropped for the 1994 edition and racewalking events took place on the track, making the entire athletics programme a track-and-field-onlyaffair. The United States won the most gold medals (18) in the athletics competition, but Russia had the greatest total medal haul, winning 41 medals, 10 of which were gold. Cuba, Great Britain and Kenya were the next best achievers in the medal count.

The competition remained invitation-only and each event was contested in a single final format. Fifteen Goodwill Games records were equalled or improved at the competition, and Marina Pluzhnikova achieved a world record in the little-contested 2000 metres steeplechase (although the IAAF does not ratify world records for that distance). The United States completed medal sweeps in the men's 100 metres, long jump, decathlon and women's 400 metres. Noureddine Morceli's winning time of 3:48.67 in the mile run was a game record and the fastest of 1994. In spite of appearances from prominent athletes such as Sergey Bubka, Irina Privalova and Carl Lewis, the stadium failed to reach much more than half of its 28,000 capacity over the five-day competition.

Gwen Torrence completed a 100/200 metres double and added the 4 × 100 metres relay for a third gold of the competition. Irina Privalova was runner-up to Torrence in both the individual sprints. Russia's Yelena Romanova retained her 5000 metres crown and also won the 3000 metres race. Jackie Joyner-Kersee won her third consecutive heptathlon title, having dominated the event since the games' inception. Two American men retained their titles won four years previously at the 1990 Goodwill Games: Michael Johnson in the 200 metres and Kenny Harrison in the triple jump. The performances of former champions Bubka and Lewis did not meet expectations; Bubka, representing Ukraine, managed only 5.70 m for the bronze in the pole vault while Lewis's run of 10.23 seconds in the 100 m left him in fourth place.

== Records ==
Name	Event	Country	Record	Type
Marina Pluzhnikova	2000 metres steeplechase	Russia	6:11.84	WR
Key:WR — World record • AR — Area record • GR — Games record • NR — National record

== Medal summary ==
=== Men ===
Event	Gold		Silver		Bronze	
100 metres	Dennis Mitchell (USA)	10.07	Leroy Burrell (USA)	10.11	Jon Drummond (USA)	10.12
200 metres	Michael Johnson (USA)	20.10 GR	Frankie Fredericks (NAM)	20.17	John Regis (GBR)	20.31
400 metres	Quincy Watts (USA)	45.21	Du'aine Ladejo (GBR)	45.21	Derek Mills (USA)	45.29
800 metres	Andrey Loginov (RUS)	1:46.65	Stanley Redwine (USA)	1:46.84	Paul Ruto (KEN)	1:47.01
One mile	Noureddine Morceli (ALG)	3:48.67 GR	Abdi Bile (SOM)	3:52.28	Steve Holman (USA)	3:52.77
5000 metres	Moses Kiptanui (KEN)	13:10.76 GR	Paul Bitok (KEN)	13:24.41	Jon Brown (GBR)	13:24.79
10,000 metres	Hammou Boutayeb (MAR)	28:10.89	Oleg Strizhakov (RUS)	28:27.69	Kipyego Kororia (KEN)	28:28.56
110 metres hurdles	Colin Jackson (GBR)	13.29	Tony Jarrett (GBR)	13.33	Emilio Valle (CUB)	13.35
400 metres hurdles	Derrick Adkins (USA)	47.86 GR	Samuel Matete (ZAM)	47.98	Winthrop Graham (JAM)	49.13
3000 metres steeplechase	Marc Davis (USA)	8:14.30 GR	Mark Croghan (USA)	8:21.85	Joseph Keter (KEN)	8:23.13
4 × 100 metres relay	United States (USA); Mike Marsh; Leroy Burrell; Sam Jefferson; Carl Lewis	38.30	Cuba (CUB); Andrés Simón; Joel Lamela; Iván García; Leonardo Prevost	38.76	Russia (RUS); Andrey Fedoriv; Aleksandr Porkhomovskiy; Oleg Fatun; Andrey Grigoryev	38.92
4 × 400 metres relay	United States (USA); Derek Mills; Andrew Valmon; Jason Rouser; Michael Johnson	2:59.42 GR=	Cuba (CUB); Omar Mena; Iván García; Jorge Crusellas; Norberto Téllez	3:01.87	Russia (RUS); Dmitry Golovastov; Mikhail Vdovin; Dmitry Bei; Dmitry Kosov	3:02.70
20,000 m track walk	Bernardo Segura (MEX)	1:23:28.88	Ruslan Shafikov (RUS)	1:23:28.90	Jiao Baozhong (CHN)	1:24:07.60
High jump	Javier Sotomayor (CUB)	2.40 m GR	Hollis Conway (USA)	2.28 m	Leonid Pumalainen (RUS)	2.28 m
Pole vault	Igor Trandenkov (RUS)	5.90 m	Maksim Tarasov (RUS)	5.80 m	Sergey Bubka (UKR)	5.70 m
Long jump	Mike Powell (USA)	8.45 m (w)	Erick Walder (USA)	8.39 m	Kareem Streete-Thompson (USA)	8.29 m
Triple jump	Kenny Harrison (USA)	17.43 m	Mike Conley (USA)	17.25 m	Oleg Sakirkin (KAZ)	17.05 m
Shot put	C. J. Hunter (USA)	20.35 m	Randy Barnes (USA)	20.22 m	Sergey Nikolayev (RUS)	20.11 m
Discus throw	Dmitry Shevchenko (RUS)	64.68 m	Sergey Lyakhov (RUS)	62.22 m	Attila Horváth (HUN)	61.70 m
Hammer throw	Lance Deal (USA)	80.20 m	Vasiliy Sidorenko (RUS)	80.12 m	Yuriy Sedykh (RUS)	77.24 m
Javelin throw	Andrey Shevchuk (RUS)	82.90 m	Mārcis Štrobinders (LAT)	80.92 m	Yuriy Rybin (RUS)	80.38 m
Decathlon	Dan O'Brien (USA)	8715 pts GR	Steve Fritz (USA)	8177 pts	Kip Janvrin (USA)	7908 pts

=== Women ===
Event	Gold		Silver		Bronze	
100 metres	Gwen Torrence (USA)	10.95	Irina Privalova (RUS)	10.98	Juliet Cuthbert (JAM)	11.12
200 metres	Gwen Torrence (USA)	22.09 GR	Irina Privalova (RUS)	22.23	Carlette Guidry (USA)	22.42
400 metres	Jearl Miles (USA)	50.60	Maicel Malone (USA)	50.60	Natasha Kaiser-Brown (USA)	50.73
800 metres	Maria Mutola (MOZ)	1:57.63	Lyudmila Rogachova (RUS)	1:58.43	Irina Samorokova (RUS)	1:59.07
1500 metres	Yekaterina Podkopayeva (RUS)	4:04.92 GR	Sonia O'Sullivan (IRL)	4:04.97	Lyudmila Rogachova (RUS)	4:05.00
3000 metres	Yelena Romanova (RUS)	8:41.06	Fernanda Ribeiro (POR)	8:42.13	Annette Peters (USA)	8:43.65
5000 metres	Yelena Romanova (RUS)	15:28.69	Tatyana Pentukova (RUS)	15:30.15	Gitte Karlshøj (DEN)	15:33.88
10,000 metres	Tegla Loroupe (KEN)	31:52.39 GR	Klara Kashapova (RUS)	32:05.42	Gwyn Coogan (USA)	32:08.77
100 metres hurdles Wind: 3.8 m/s	Brigita Bukovec (SLO)	12.83 (w)	Aliuska López (CUB)	12.88 (w)	Marina Azyabina (RUS)	12.99 (w)
400 metres hurdles	Sally Gunnell (GBR)	53.51 GR	Kim Batten (USA)	54.22	Anna Knoroz (RUS)	54.67
2000 metres steeplechase	Marina Pluzhnikova (RUS)	6:11.84 GR WR	Svetlana Pospelova (RUS)	6:25.19	Lyudmila Kuropatkina (RUS)	6:26.76
4 × 100 metres relay	United States (USA); Cheryl Taplin; Dannette Young; Michelle Collins; Gwen Torrence	42.98	Cuba (CUB); Miriam Ferrer; Aliuska López; Julia Duporty; Liliana Allen	43.37	Ukraine (UKR); Anzhela Kravchenko; Viktoriya Fomenko; Irina Slyusar; Antonina Slyusar	43.86
4 × 400 metres relay	United States (USA); Natasha Kaiser-Brown; Maicel Malone; Jearl Miles; Michelle Collins	3:22.27	Russia (RUS); Yelena Andreyeva; Yelena Golesheva; Yelena Ruzina; Tatyana Zakharova	3:25.00	Cuba (CUB); Idalmis Bonne; Julia Duporty; Surella Morales; Nancy McLeón	3:26.35
10,000 m track walk	Olimpiada Ivanova (RUS)	42:30.31	Yelena Sayko (RUS)	42:43.23	Sari Essayah (FIN)	42:45.04
High jump	Silvia Costa (CUB)	1.95 m	Yelena Topchina (RUS)	1.93 m	Olga Bolșova (MDA)	1.93 m
Pole vault	Sun Caiyun (CHN)	4.00 m GR	Svetlana Abramova (RUS)	3.90 m	Andrea Müller (GER)	3.90 m
Long jump	Heike Drechsler (GER)	7.12 m	Svetlana Moskalets (RUS)	6.82 m	Irina Mushailova (RUS)	6.77 m
Triple jump	Anna Biryukova (RUS)	14.57 m GR	Lyudmila Dubkova (RUS)	13.99 m	Sheila Hudson (USA)	13.97 m
Shot put	Sui Xinmei (CHN)	20.15 m	Huang Zhihong (CHN)	20.08 m	Svetla Mitkova (BUL)	19.74 m
Discus throw	Bárbara Hechavarría (CUB)	64.84 m	Olga Chernyavskaya (RUS)	63.82 m	Daniela Costian (AUS)	63.72 m
Javelin throw	Trine Hattestad (NOR)	65.74 m	Felicia Tilea (ROM)	59.48 m	Oksana Yarygina (UZB)	59.30 m
Heptathlon	Jackie Joyner-Kersee (USA)	6606 pts	Larisa Turchinskaya (RUS)	6492 pts	Ghada Shouaa (SYR)	6361 pts

== Medal table ==
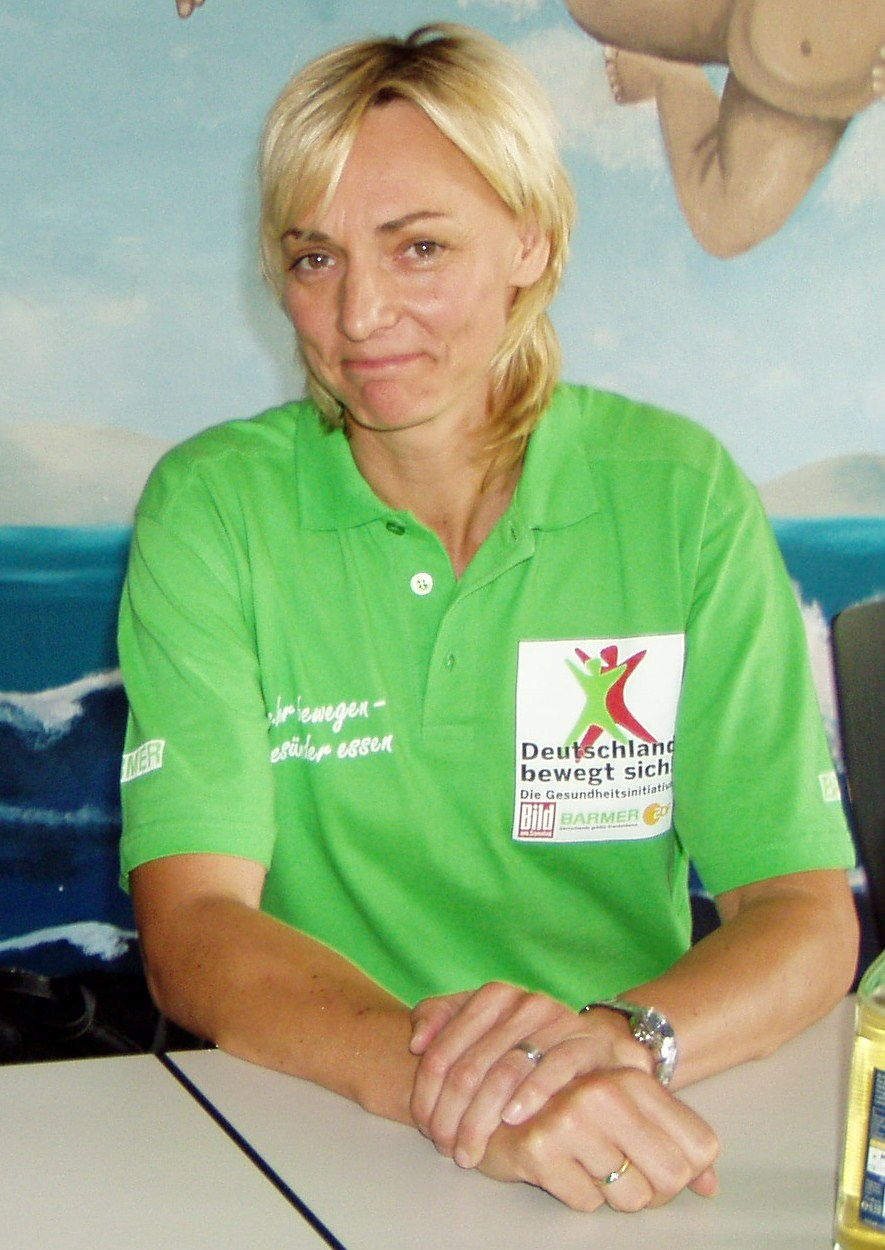
Heike Drechsler won the long jump gold for Germany.

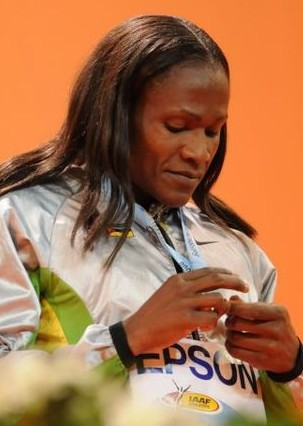
Mozambique's sole medal came from 800 metres winner Maria Mutola.

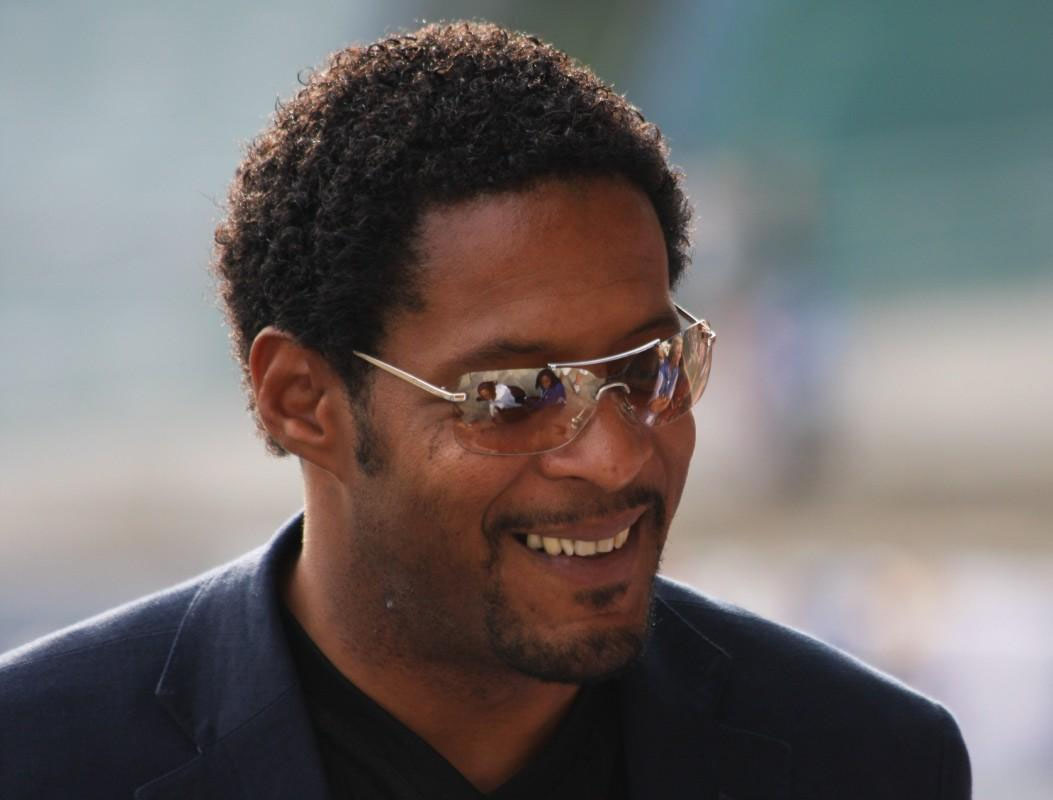
Javier Sotomayor of Cuba set the games record to win the high jump.

* Host nation (Russia)

Rank	Nation	Gold	Silver	Bronze	Total
1	United States	18	10	10	38
2	Russia*	10	19	12	41
3	Cuba	3	4	2	9
4	Great Britain	2	2	2	6
5	Kenya	2	1	3	6
6	China	2	1	1	4
7	Germany	1	0	1	2
8	Algeria	1	0	0	1
8	Mexico	1	0	0	1
8	Morocco	1	0	0	1
8	Mozambique	1	0	0	1
8	Norway	1	0	0	1
8	Slovenia	1	0	0	1
14	Ireland	0	1	0	1
14	Latvia	0	1	0	1
14	Namibia	0	1	0	1
14	Portugal	0	1	0	1
14	Romania	0	1	0	1
14	Somalia	0	1	0	1
14	Zambia	0	1	0	1
21	Jamaica	0	0	2	2
21	Ukraine	0	0	2	2
23	Australia	0	0	1	1
23	Bulgaria	0	0	1	1
23	Denmark	0	0	1	1
23	Finland	0	0	1	1
23	Hungary	0	0	1	1
23	Kazakhstan	0	0	1	1
23	Moldova	0	0	1	1
23	Syria	0	0	1	1
23	Uzbekistan	0	0	1	1
Totals (31 entries)		44	44	44	132

== Participation ==
- Algeria (4)
- Argentina (1)
- Australia (5)
- Austria (1)
- Belarus (13)
- Brazil (2)
- Bulgaria (4)
- Canada (1)
- China (11)
- Chinese Taipei (1)
- Cuba (24)
- Denmark (1)
- Estonia (2)
- Finland (1)
- Germany (3)
- Great Britain (13)
- Hungary (1)
- Ireland (3)
- Italy (1)
- Jamaica (4)
- Japan (2)
- Kazakhstan (12)
- Kenya (9)
- Latvia (3)
- Lithuania (3)
- Mexico (1)
- Moldova (3)
- Morocco (1)
- Mozambique (1)
- Namibia (1)
- Norway (1)
- Portugal (1)
- Romania (4)
- Russia (115)
- Slovenia (1)
- Somalia (1)
- South Africa (1)
- Spain (1)
- Syria (1)
- Tajikistan (1)
- Turkmenistan (1)
- Ukraine (30)
- Uruguay (1)
- United States (76)
- Uzbekistan (4)
- Zambia (1)
