= Roberto Moya =

Cuban athlete (1965–2020)

Personal information
- Full name: Roberto Saturnino Moya Sandoval
- Born: February 11, 1965 Havana, Cuba
- Died: May 21, 2020 (aged 55) Valencia, Spain
Medal record
Men's athletics
Representing Cuba
Olympic Games
Bronze medal – third place	1992 Barcelona	Discus throw
Pan American Games
Gold medal – first place	1995 Mar del Plata	Discus throw
Silver medal – second place	1991 Havana	Discus throw
Summer Universiade
Bronze medal – third place	1989 Duisburg	Discus throw
Central American and Caribbean Games
Gold medal – first place	1990 Mexico City	Discus throw

Roberto Saturnino Moya Sandoval (February 11, 1965 – May 21, 2020) was a Cuban athlete who mainly competed in the discus throw.

He was born in Havana, Ciudad de la Habana. He won the bronze medal at the 1992 Summer Olympics in this event, and his personal best is 65.68.

Moya became a Spanish citizen in August 2001.

== Competition record ==
Year	Competition	Venue	Position	Event	Notes
Representing Cuba
1986	Ibero-American Championships	Havana, Cuba	1st	Discus	59.04 m
1987	Central American and Caribbean Championships	Caracas, Venezuela	1st	Discus	60.10 m
1989	Central American and Caribbean Championships	San Juan, Puerto Rico	1st	Discus	62.12 m
1989	Universiade	Duisburg, West Germany	3rd	Discus	63.78 m
1990	Central American and Caribbean Games	Mexico City, Mexico	1st	Discus	64.64 m
1991	Pan American Games	Havana, Cuba	2nd	Discus	63.92 m
1991	World Championships	Tokyo, Japan	8th	Discus	61.44 m
1992	Ibero-American Championships	Seville, Spain	3rd	Discus	61.52 m
1992	Olympic Games	Barcelona, Spain	3rd	Discus	64.12 m
1992	World Cup	Havana, Cuba	2nd	Discus	63.66 m
1993	World Championships	Stuttgart, Germany	17th (q)	Discus	60.10 m
1994	Goodwill Games	St. Petersburg, Russia	4th	Discus	60.78 m
1995	Pan American Games	Mar del Plata, Argentina	1st	Discus	63.58 m
1995	World Championships	Gothenburg, Sweden	31st (q)	Discus	57.58 m
1996	Olympic Games	Atlanta, United States	22nd (q)	Discus	59.22 m
