= Athletics at the 1999 Pan American Games – Men's discus throw =

Men's discus throw at the Pan American Games

The men's discus throw event at the 1999 Pan American Games was held on July 28.

== Results ==
Rank	Name	Nationality	#1	#2	#3	#4	#5	#6	Result	Notes
1st place, gold medalist(s)	Anthony Washington	United States	x	61.62	64.25	x	60.43	64.07	64.25	
2nd place, silver medalist(s)	Alexis Elizalde	Cuba	x	59.28	58.34	x	61.99	61.02	61.99	
3rd place, bronze medalist(s)	Jason Tunks	Canada	58.58	x	59.39	59.37	59.54	61.75	61.75	
4	Frank Casañas	Cuba	x	58.29	x	60.20	x	x	60.20	
5	Doug Reynolds	United States	58.52	x	x	x	57.42	59.27	59.27	
6	Marcelo Pugliese	Argentina	56.12	55.07	56.34	53.96	55.81	53.22	56.34	
7	Julio Piñero	Argentina	51.92	55.24	55.61	x	x	x	55.61	
8	Jason Gervais	Canada	x	53.96	x	55.03	52.54	54.14	55.03	
9	Kevin Brown	Jamaica	53.16	x	x				53.16	
10	Alfredo Romero	Puerto Rico	49.93	51.16	x				51.16	
11	Andrés Solo de Zaldívar	Chile	x	46.12	50.35				50.35	
	Édson Miguel	Brazil							DNS	
