= Dashdendeviin Makhashiri =

Mongolian discus thrower (born 1969)

Personal information
- Born: 13 January 1969 (age 57) Ulaanbaatar, Mongolia

Sport
- Sport: Track and field
Medal record
Representing Mongolia
Asian Championships
Silver medal – second place	1998 Fukuoka	Discus throw
East Asian Games
Bronze medal – third place	1993 Shanghai	Discus throw
Bronze medal – third place	1997 Busan	Discus throw
Bronze medal – third place	2001 Osaka	Discus throw

Dashdendeviin Makhashiri (Mongolian: Дашдэндэвийн Махашири; born 13 January 1969) is a retired Mongolian athlete who specialised in the discus throw. He represented his country at the 1996 Summer Olympics, as well as three consecutive World Championships starting in 1993.

== Competition record ==
Year	Competition	Venue	Position	Event	Notes
Representing Mongolia
1993	East Asian Games	Shanghai, China	3rd	Discus throw	49.72 m
1993	World Championships	Stuttgart, Germany	32nd (q)	Shot put	14.87 m
1993	World Championships	Stuttgart, Germany	26th (q)	Discus throw	51.62 m
1994	Asian Games	Hiroshima, Japan	5th	Discus throw	54.90 m
1995	World Championships	Gothenburg, Sweden	42nd (q)	Discus throw	51.04 m
1996	Olympic Games	Atlanta, United States	23rd (q)	Discus throw	59.16 m
1997	East Asian Games	Busan, South Korea	3rd	Discus throw	60.14 m
1997	World Championships	Athens, Greece	39th (q)	Discus throw	52.12 m
1997	Universiade	Catania, Italy	18th (q)	Discus throw	50.42 m
1998	Asian Championships	Fukuoka, Japan	2nd	Discus throw	57.00 m
1998	Asian Games	Bangkok, Thailand	4th	Discus throw	56.05 m
2000	Asian Championships	Jakarta, Indonesia	6th	Discus throw	54.96 m
2001	East Asian Games	Osaka, Japan	3rd	Discus throw	55.74 m
2005	Asian Championships	Incheon, South Korea	14th	Discus throw	42.12 m

== Personal bests ==
- Shot put – 17.80 (Irkutsk 1998) NR
- Discus throw – 60.14 (Busan 1997) NR
- Hammer throw – 49.97 (Ulan Bator 2005) NR
