= Lars Riedel =

German discus thrower (born 1967)

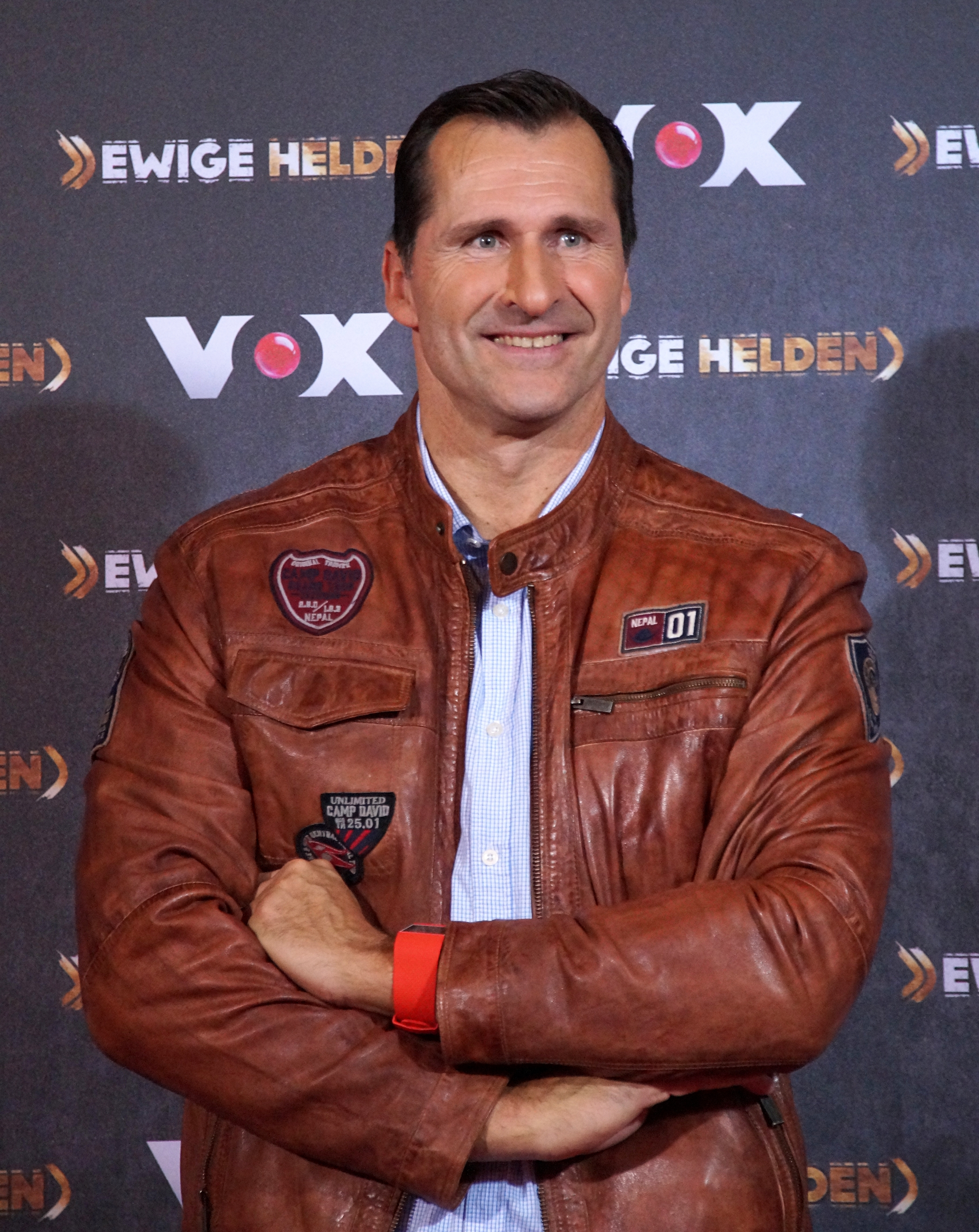

Personal information
- Full name: Lars Peter Riedel
- Born: 28 June 1967 (age 59) Zwickau, Saxony, East Germany
- Height: 1.99 m (6 ft 6 in)
- Weight: 110 kg (243 lb)

Sport
- Country: East Germany (1986–1990); Germany (1991–2006)
- Sport: Athletics
- Event: Discus throw
- Club: USC Mainz; LAC Erdgas Chemnitz

Achievements and titles
- Personal best: 71.50 m (1997)
Medal record
Men's athletics
Representing Germany
Olympic Games
Gold medal – first place	1996 Atlanta	Discus
Silver medal – second place	2000 Sydney	Discus
World Championships
Gold medal – first place	1991 Tokyo	Discus
Gold medal – first place	1993 Stuttgart	Discus
Gold medal – first place	1995 Gothenburg	Discus
Gold medal – first place	1997 Athens	Discus
Gold medal – first place	2001 Edmonton	Discus
Bronze medal – third place	1999 Seville	Discus
European Championships
Gold medal – first place	1998 Budapest	Discus

Lars Peter Riedel (born 28 June 1967) a former German discus thrower. Riedel has the seventh longest discus throw of all-time with a personal best of 71.50 m.

== Biography ==
Riedel began his discus career in the former German Democratic Republic. He grew up in Thurm which is next to Zwickau. In 1983, he went to join SC Karl-Marx-Stadt. His first important competitions were the IAAF World Junior Championship in 1986 and the European Championship in 1990. When the GDR dissolved, Riedel stopped training regularly. Soon after, Riedel met his coach Karlheinz Steinmetz in Mainz where he began training once again. In the 1990s, he became a dominating figure on the German discus scene. With his good physical constitution (1.99 m, 115 kg), he took part in the Olympic Games of Atlanta. There he won his only Olympic title. Furthermore, he won the IAAF World Championship five times.

He is separated from his wife Kerstin. They have a son, Robert.

== Achievements ==
Year	Competition	Venue	Position	Notes
Representing East Germany
1986	World Junior Championships	Athens, Greece	4th	58.16 m
1990	European Championships	Split, Yugoslavia	15th (q)	59.28 m
Representing Germany
1991	World Championships	Tokyo, Japan	1st	66.20 m
1992	Olympic Games	Barcelona, Spain	14th (q)	59.98 m
1993	World Championships	Stuttgart, Germany	1st	67.72 m
1994	European Championships	Helsinki, Finland	10th (q)	58.66 m
1995	World Championships	Gothenburg, Sweden	1st	68.76 m
1996	Olympic Games	Atlanta, United States	1st	69.40 m
1997	World Championships	Athens, Greece	1st	68.54 m
1997	IAAF Grand Prix Final	Fukuoka, Japan	1st	67.98 m
1998	European Championships	Budapest, Hungary	1st	67.07 m
1999	World Championships	Seville, Spain	3rd	68.09 m
2000	Olympic Games	Sydney, Australia	2nd	68.50 m
2001	World Championships	Edmonton, Canada	1st	69.72 m
2003	World Championships	Paris, France	4th	66.28 m
2004	Olympic Games	Athens, Greece	7th	62.80 m
2005	World Championships	Helsinki, Finland	9th	63.05 m
2006	European Championships	Gothenburg, Sweden	8th	64.11 m

In addition, he was the German champion 11 times.
