= Dragan Mustapić =

Croatian discus thrower (born 1963)

Personal information
- Born: 23 March 1963 (age 63) Imotski, Yugoslavia

Sport
- Sport: Track and field

Dragan Mustapić (born 23 March 1963) is a male discus thrower from Croatia. His personal best throw was 64.40 metres, achieved in July 2000 in Ljubljana. He also had 18.39 metres in the shot put, achieved in December 2005 in Toronto.

Mustapić was born in Imotski. He was a five-time Yugoslav discus throw champion (1987–1991) and was the first Yugoslav discus thrower to surpass 60 meters. He finished seventh at the 2001 Mediterranean Games. He also competed at the 1995 World Championships, the 1998 European Championships, as well as the Olympic Games in 1992, 1996, 2000 and 2004 without reaching the final.

Mustapić has a B.Sc. degree in criminology and a Ph.D. in economics. During his sports career, he was an officer in the Croatian Army. As of 2019, he attained a rank of colonel, and was teaching at the Franjo Tuđman Military Academy in Zagreb.

== Achievements ==
Year	Competition	Venue	Position	Notes
Representing Yugoslavia
1987	Universiade	Zagreb, Yugoslavia	8th	54.79 m
1987	Mediterranean Games	Latakia, Syria	4th	57.12 m
1989	Universiade	Duisburg, West Germany	9th	56.39 m
Representing Bosnia and Herzegovina
1992	Olympic Games	Barcelona, Spain	29th (q)	48.80 m
Representing Croatia
1995	World Championships	Gothenburg, Sweden	41st (q)	53.54 m
1996	Olympic Games	Atlanta, United States	27th (q)	57.94 m
1997	Mediterranean Games	Bari, Italy	6th	57.04 m
1998	European Championships	Budapest, Hungary	27th (q)	54.73 m
2000	Olympic Games	Sydney, Australia	34th (q)	58.10 m
2001	Mediterranean Games	Radès, Tunisia	7th	58.45 m
2004	Olympic Games	Athens, Greece	34th (q)	54.66 m
