= Alexis Elizalde =

Cuban discus thrower (born 1967)

Personal information
- Born: Alexis Elizalde Estévez; November 19, 1967 (age 58) Havana, Cuba
Medal record
Representing Cuba
Summer Universiade
Gold medal – first place	1993 Buffalo	Discus throw
Bronze medal – third place	1991 Sheffield	Discus throw
Pan American Games
Silver medal – second place	1995 Mar del Plata	Discus throw
Silver medal – second place	1999 Winnipeg	Discus throw
Central American and Caribbean Games
Gold medal – first place	1993 Ponce	Discus throw
Gold medal – first place	1998 Maracaibo	Discus throw

Alexis Elizalde Estévez (born September 19, 1967) is a Cuban retired discus thrower. His personal best throw is 65.00 m (213 ft 3 in), which he achieved in August 1998 at the Central American and Caribbean Games. He represented his country twice at the Summer Olympics, in 1996 and 2000, and was a three-time participant at the World Championships in Athletics (1993, 1995 and 1997).

Elizalde's highest honour was a gold medal at the 1993 Summer Universiade. He was twice a silver medallist at the Pan American Games (1995 and 1999) and also won two Central American and Caribbean Games titles during his career. Among his other major medals was a silver at the 1994 IAAF World Cup and a bronze medal at the 1991 Summer Universiade.

== International competitions ==
Year	Competition	Venue	Position	Event	Notes
Representing Cuba
1986	Central American and Caribbean; Junior Championships (U-20)	Mexico City, Mexico	2nd	Discus	48.96 m A
1986	World Junior Championships	Athens, Greece	15th (q)	Discus	47.78 m
1991	Universiade	Sheffield, United Kingdom	3rd	Discus	59.04 m
1993	Universiade	Buffalo, United States	1st	Discus	62.98 m
1993	World Championships	Stuttgart, Germany	6th (q)	Discus	60.76 m
1993	Central American and Caribbean Games	Ponce, Puerto Rico	1st	Discus	61.24 m
1994	World Cup	London, United Kingdom	2nd	Discus	61.50 m
1995	World Championships	Gothenburg, Sweden	7th	Discus	63.28 m
1995	Pan American Games	Mar del Plata, Argentina	2nd	Discus	62.00 m
1996	Olympic Games	Atlanta, United States	9th	Discus	62.70 m
1997	World Championships	Athens, Greece	7th (q)	Discus	61.48 m
1998	Central American and Caribbean Games	Maracaibo, Venezuela	1st	Discus	65.00 m PB
1999	Pan American Games	Winnipeg, Canada	2nd	Discus	61.99 m
2000	Olympic Games	Sydney, Australia	20th	Discus	61.13 m
