= Rolf Erb =

- Born: Rolf Peter Erb; 2 September 1951; Winterthur, Switzerland
- Died: 8 April 2017 (aged 65); Eugensberg Castle, Salenstein, Switzerland
- Occupation: Businessman
- Employer: Erb Group
- Spouse: Christina Conze (m. 1981; div. 2002)
- Children: 2
- Status: Deceased
- Criminal charges: Fraud, Forgery
- Penalty: 7 years in prison

Rolf Peter Erb (2 September 1951 – 8 April 2017) was a Swiss businessman. He was primarily known for his involvement in the Erb Group bankruptcy case in 2003, the second largest in Switzerland's history after Swissair, with debts over $2 billion.

== Early life and education ==
Erb was born in Winterthur, Switzerland on 2 September 1951, the second of three sons, to Hugo Erb Jr. (1918–2003) and Loni Erb (née Frey; 1924–2000). He had an older brother, Heinz Erb (1949–1972), and a younger brother, Christian Erb (born 1958).

He studied art history in Florence, Italy with the intention of becoming an art historian. After the unexpected death of his older brother in a car accident his father convinced him to enter the family business and he received further education in business administration.

== Erb Case ==
On 22 March 2012, Erb was sentenced to eight years in prison by the Winterthur District Court for making false business statements, document forgery on several counts and prejudicial treatment of creditors by reducing personal assets. Erb appealed the sentence. On 15 January 2015 the sentence was reduced to seven years in prison. Furthermore, the courts decided that all personal property, including a classic car collection as well as his real estate portfolio, which included a Winterthur estate and Eugensberg Castle, should be auctioned by authorities. An attempt by Erb's legal team to move the case to the Federal Supreme Court was dismissed on 16 September 2015. Erb deferred entering prison several times through medical certificates and other legal options. He was supposed to report to prison on 5 April 2017, which he was able to defer one last time before dying.

== Personal life ==
In 1981, Erb married Christina Dorothea Conze (1958–2009). They did not have any children. In 2002, Erb had two twin sons from another relationship.

Erb died of a heart attack on 8 April 2017 at Eugensberg Castle in Salenstein, Switzerland aged 65.
