= Sergey Lukashok =

Israeli discus thrower

Sergey Lukashok (Hebrew: סרגיי לוקשוק; born 20 June 1958) is a retired Israeli discus thrower.

His personal best throw was 66.64 metres, achieved in September 1983 in Odessa, while representing the Soviet Union. After the dissolution of the Soviet Union he got Belarusian citizenship, but emigrated to Israel. He won the Israeli championship in 1993, 1994 and 1995. Internationally he represented his new country at the 1993 and 1995 World Championships, and finished eleventh at the 1994 European Championships.

He stood at 2.02 m (6 ft 7 1/2 in) tall, and weighed about 130 kilograms (290 lb) during his active career.

== See also ==
- List of Maccabiah records in athletics
