= João Joaquim dos Santos =

Retired Brazilian Athlete

Personal information
- Born: 9 September 1961
- Died: 8 January 2025 (aged 63)
- Height: 1.91 m (6 ft 3 in)
- Weight: 118 kg (260 lb)

Sport
- Sport: Athletics
- Events: Discus throw, shot put

João Joaquim dos Santos (9 September 1961 – 8 January 2025) was a Brazilian athlete who competed primarily in the discus throw. He won multiple medals at regional level.

His personal best in the discus is 59.72 metres set in Americana in 1992. Additionally, his personal best in the shot put is 17.04 metres set in Rio de Janeiro in 1995. He died on 8 January 2025.

== International competitions ==
| Year | Competition | Venue | Position | Event | Notes |
Representing Brazil
| 1987 | South American Championships | São Paulo, Brazil | 3rd | Discus throw | 51.16 m |
| 1989 | South American Championships | Medellín, Colombia | 3rd | Shot put | 16.25 m |
| 1989 | South American Championships | Medellín, Colombia | 1st | Discus throw | 58.00 m |
| 1989 | Universiade | Duisburg, West Germany | 11th | Discus throw | 55.42 m |
| 1990 | Ibero-American Championships | Manaus, Brazil | 2nd | Discus throw | 58.14 m |
| 1991 | South American Championships | Manaus, Brazil | 1st | Discus throw | 58.08 m |
| 1992 | Ibero-American Championships | Seville, Spain | 5th | Discus throw | 55.96 m |
| 1993 | South American Championships | Lima, Peru | 3rd | Shot put | 16.76 m |
| 1993 | South American Championships | Lima, Peru | 2nd | Discus throw | 55.28 m |
| 1994 | Ibero-American Championships | Mar del Plata, Argentina | 2nd | Discus throw | 59.20 m |
| 1995 | South American Championships | Manaus, Brazil | 1st | Discus throw | 58.52 m |
| 1996 | Ibero-American Championships | Medellín, Colombia | 6th | Shot put | 16.40 m |
| 1996 | Ibero-American Championships | Medellín, Colombia | 2nd | Discus throw | 55.32 m |
| 1999 | South American Championships | Bogotá, Colombia | 3rd | Discus throw | 55.82 m |
| 2000 | Ibero-American Championships | Mar del Plata, Argentina | 3rd | Discus throw | 17.77 m |
| 2001 | South American Championships | Manaus, Brazil | 2nd | Discus throw | 54.40 m |
