= Athletics at the 1995 Pan American Games – Men's discus throw =

Men's discus throw at the Pan American Games

The men's discus throw event at the 1995 Pan American Games was held at the Estadio Atletico "Justo Roman" on 22 March.

== Results ==
Rank	Name	Nationality	#1	#2	#3	#4	#5	#6	Result	Notes
1st place, gold medalist(s)	Roberto Moya	Cuba	62.56	63.58	59.68	60.84	x	x	63.58	
2nd place, silver medalist(s)	Alexis Elizarde	Cuba	60.20	x	51.10	62.00	58.70	57.82	62.00	
3rd place, bronze medalist(s)	Randy Heisler	United States	60.12	57.30	57.30	x	58.06	59.66	60.12	
4	Ramón Jiménez Gaona	Paraguay	59.56	58.58	x	x	x	56.92	59.56	
5	Marcelo Pugliese	Argentina	49.52	55.46	52.54	55.68	55.14	54.56	55.68	
6	Carlos Scott	United States	54.38	x	54.58	x	x	53.42	54.58	
7	Julio Piñero	Argentina	50.88	x	51.74	x	51.44	52.46	52.46	
8	Brian Bynoe	Dominica	x	x	40.14	x	38.20	x	40.14	
9	Curtley Bynoe	Dominica	x	37.80	36.94				37.80	
