= Erb Group =

Former Swiss auto retailer (1920–2003)

- Native name: Hugo Erb AG
- Industry: Conglomerate
- Founded: 1920; 106 years ago in Switzerland
- Founder: Hugo Erb, Sr.
- Defunct: 2003
- Headquarters: Winterthur, Switzerland
- Key people: Hugo Erb; Rolf Erb; Christian Erb
- Revenue: ▼US$6.2 billion (2003)
- Number of employees: 5,000 (2003)
- Website: erb.ch (defunct)

Erb Group (officially Hugo Erb AG) was a Swiss conglomerate primarily active as automotive retailer. Founded in 1920, the company started as automobile repair shop in Winterthur, Switzerland, which until the 1980s became one of the key players of Switzerlands automotive industry alongside Emil Frey Group and AMAG (Importer of Audi).

In the 1990s, under the second generation, the concern diversified into coffee trading, real estate and kitchens. In 2003, the concern collapsed and had to declare bankruptcy, which ultimate became the second largest bankruptcy case in Switzerland, after Swissair in 2001.
