= Mickaël Conjungo =

French discus thrower

Personal information
- Full name: Mickaël Glenn Conjungo Taumhas
- Born: 6 May 1969 (age 57) Bangui, Central African Republic

Sport
- Country: Central African Republic; France
- Sport: Athletics
- Event: Discus throw
Medal record
Men's athletics
Representing Central African Republic
African Championships
| Gold medal – first place | 1993 Durban | Discus throw |
| Silver medal – second place | 2000 Algiers | Discus throw |
| Bronze medal – third place | 1998 Dakar | Discus throw |
African Games
| Silver medal – second place | 1995 Harare | Discus throw |
| Bronze medal – third place | 1999 Johannesburg | Discus throw |

Mickaël Glenn Conjungo Taumhas (born 6 May 1969) is a French discus thrower. He formerly represented his birth country of the Central African Republic.

== Career ==
On the regional African level he won a gold medal at the 1993 African Championships, silver medals at the 1995 All-Africa Games and the 2000 African Championships and bronze medals at the 1998 African Championships and 1999 All-Africa Games. He also won silver at the 1994 Jeux de la Francophonie and bronze at the 1997 Jeux de la Francophonie.

He competed at the Summer Olympics in 1992, 1996 and 2000 and the World Championships in 1991, 1993, 1995, 1997 and 1999 without reaching the finals.

His personal best throw is 63.78 metres, achieved in July 1994 in Sorgues. This is the current national record for the Central African Republic. For this country he holds the national record in all throwing events, and even pole vault. His sister, Maria-Joëlle Conjungo, is also a national record holder.

== Achievements ==
| Year | Competition | Venue | Position | Event | Notes |
Representing Central African Republic
| 1991 | World Championships | Tokyo, Japan | 32nd (q) | Discus throw | 53.02 m |
| 1992 | Olympic Games | Barcelona, Spain | 24th (q) | Discus throw | 57.46 m |
| 1993 | African Championships | Durban, South Africa | 1st | Discus throw | 59.92 m |
| 1993 | Universiade | Buffalo, United States | 8th | Discus throw | 57.38 m |
| 1993 | World Championships | Stuttgart, Germany | 25th (q) | Discus throw | 53.60 m |
| 1994 | Jeux de la Francophonie | Bondoufle, France | 2nd | Discus throw | 60.40 m |
| 1995 | World Championships | Gothenburg, Sweden | 32nd (q) | Discus throw | 57.36 m |
| 1995 | Universiade | Fukuoka, Japan | 6th | Discus throw | 58.52 m |
| 1995 | All-Africa Games | Harare, Zimbabwe | 2nd | Discus throw | 58.94 m |
| 1996 | Olympic Games | Atlanta, United States | 34th (q) | Discus throw | 55.34 m |
| 1997 | World Championships | Athens, Greece | 29th (q) | Discus throw | 57.82 m |
| 1997 | Jeux de la Francophonie | Antananarivo, Madagascar | 3rd | Discus throw | 57.47 m |
| 1998 | African Championships | Dakar, Senegal | 3rd | Discus throw | 57.52 m |
| 1999 | World Championships | Seville, Spain | 22nd (q) | Discus throw | 59.16 m |
| 1999 | All-Africa Games | Johannesburg, South Africa | 6th | Shot put | 14.05 m |
| 1999 | All-Africa Games | Johannesburg, South Africa | 3rd | Discus throw | 57.09 m |
| 2000 | African Championships | Algiers, Algeria | 2nd | Discus throw | 59.58 m |
| 2000 | Olympic Games | Sydney, Australia | 35th (q) | Discus throw | 57.85 m |
| 2001 | Jeux de la Francophonie | Ottawa, Canada | 8th | Discus throw | 55.78 m |
