= Christian Erb =

Swiss discus thrower

Personal information
- Nationality: Swiss
- Born: 14 February 1959 (age 67) Winterthur
- Height: 182
- Weight: 90

Sport
- Sport: Athletics
- Event: Discus throw
- Club: LV Winterthur

Christian Erb (born 14 February 1959) is a Swiss athlete and businessman. He competed in the men's discus throw at the 1992 Summer Olympics.

== Early life and education ==
Erb was born 14 February 1959 in Winterthur, Switzerland, the youngest of three children, to Hugo Erb Jr. (1918–2003), a businessman, and Loni Erb (née Frey; 1924–2000), into the Erb family. He had two older brothers; Heinz Erb (1949–1972) and Rolf Erb (1951–2017).

In 1994, following a car accident, Erb was left paralysed and unable to walk. As a result, Erb retired from competing and became a trainer, notably of Randy Barnes. He was rewarded the Olympic Order (Silver) in 1996 for his contributions to sports throughout his athletic career.

He attended Lyceum Alpinum Zuoz and practiced boxing, soccer and bobsleigh during his youth.
