= Sergey Lyakhov =

Russian discus thrower and shot putter

Sergey Vladimirovich Lyakhov (Russian: Серге́й Владимирович Ляхов; born March 1, 1968) is a retired discus thrower and shot putter from Russia, who represented his native country at the 1996 Summer Olympics. His personal bests are 19.52 metres in the shot put (Moscow, 1999-06-17), and 66.78 metres in the discus throw (Monaco, 1995-09-09). He is a two-time Russian national champion in the discus event.

== International competitions ==
Year	Competition	Venue	Position	Event	Notes
Representing the Soviet Union
1991	World Championships	Tokyo, Japan	9th	Discus	61.00 m
Representing Russia
1994	European Championships	Helsinki, Finland	9th	Discus	60.80 m
1995	World Championships	Gothenburg, Sweden	9th (q)	Discus throw	60.50 m
1996	Olympic Games	Atlanta, United States	11th	Discus	60.62 m
