= Wulf Brunner =

German discus thrower

Personal information
- Born: 20 March 1962 (age 64) Nuremberg, West Germany

Sport
- Sport: Track and field

Wulf Brunner (born 20 March 1962) is a retired West German discus thrower.

== Biography ==
He competed at the Olympic Games in 1988 without reaching the final.

His personal best throw was 66.42 metres, achieved in July 1988 in Kassel. He represented the sports club TV Gelnhausen.

== Achievements ==
Year	Competition	Venue	Position	Event	Notes
Representing West Germany
1988	Olympic Games	Seoul, South Korea	22nd	Discus	57.50 m
