= Dmitry Shevchenko (discus thrower) =

Russian discus thrower (born 1968)

Dmitriy Shevchenko
Personal information
- Native name: Дмитрий Игоревич Шевченко
- Full name: Dmitriy Igorievich Shevchenko
- Nationality: Russian
- Born: May 13, 1968 (age 58) Taganrog, Russian SFSR, Soviet Union
- Years active: 1990–2006
- Height: 2.00 m (6 ft 7 in)
- Weight: 130 kg (287 lb)

Sport
- Country: Russia
- Sport: Men's athletics
- Event: Discus throw
- Club: Dynamo Krasnodar; Dynamo Moscow
- Turned pro: 1990
- Retired: 2006

Achievements and titles
- Personal best: 70.54 m (2002)
Medal record
Men's athletics
Representing Russia
World Championships
Silver medal – second place	1993 Stuttgart	Discus
European Championships
Silver medal – second place	1994 Helsinki	Discus
Goodwill Games
Gold medal – first place	1994 St. Petersburg	Discus
Gold medal – first place	1998 Uniondale	Discus

Dmitriy Igorievich Shevchenko (Russian: Дмитрий Игоревич Шевченко; born May 13, 1968, in Taganrog) is a Russian discus thrower who won silver medals at the World and European Championships. Despite this he did not throw past the 70 metres mark until 2002, when he achieved his personal best throw of 70.54 metres in Krasnodar. His three participations in the Olympics were all fruitless, especially the 2004 edition where he exited without any valid throws.

He is a six-time national champion in the discus event. He missed the 1996 and 1997 seasons, due to a doping suspension.

His wife, whom he also coaches, is the hurdler Irina Shevchenko.

== International competitions ==
Year	Competition	Venue	Position	Notes
Representing the Soviet Union
1991	World Championships	Tokyo, Japan	7th	62.90 m
Representing the Unified Team
1992	Olympic Games	Barcelona, Spain	8th	61.78 m
Representing Russia
1993	World Championships	Stuttgart, Germany	2nd	66.90 m
1994	European Championships	Helsinki, Finland	2nd	64.56 m
1994	Goodwill Games	St. Petersburg, Russia	1st	64.68 m
1995	World Championships	Gothenburg, Sweden	8th	63.18 m
1998	European Championships	Budapest, Hungary	—	NM
1998	Goodwill Games	Uniondale, United States	1st	64.81 m
2000	Olympic Games	Sydney, Australia	11th	62.65 m
2001	World Championships	Edmonton, Canada	4th	67.57 m
2002	European Championships	Munich, Germany	6th	63.97 m
2003	World Championships	Paris, France	10th	62.28 m
2004	Olympic Games	Athens, Greece	—	NM
2006	European Championships	Gothenburg, Sweden	—	NM

== See also ==
- List of doping cases in athletics
