= Jürgen Schult =

East German discus thrower

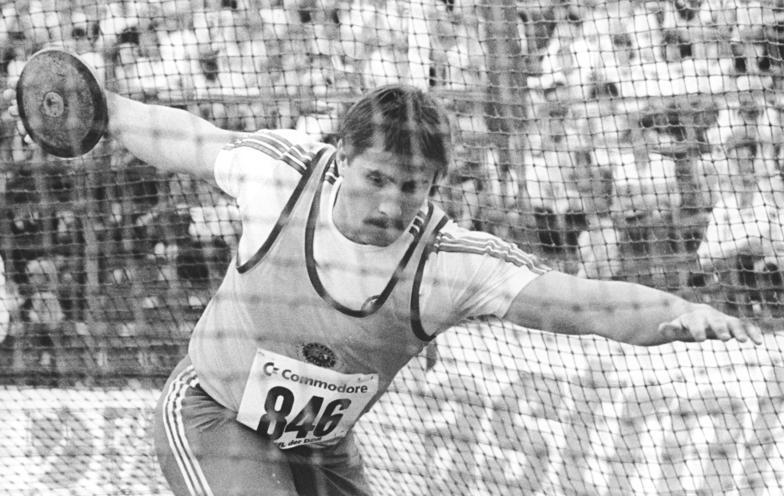
- Schult in 1988

Personal information
- Born: 11 May 1960 (age 66) Neuhaus, Hagenow, Mecklenburg-Vorpommern, East Germany
- Height: 193 cm (6 ft 4 in)
- Weight: 110 kg (243 lb)

Sport
- Country: East Germany (1979–1990); Germany (1991–2000)
- Sport: Athletics
- Event: Discus throw
- Club: Schweriner SC; SC Riesa

Achievements and titles
- Personal best: 74.08 m (1986)
Medal record
Men's athletics
Representing East Germany
Olympic Games
Gold medal – first place	1988 Seoul	Discus
World Championships
Gold medal – first place	1987 Rome	Discus
European Championships
Gold medal – first place	1990 Split	Discus throw
Representing Germany
Olympic Games
Silver medal – second place	1992 Barcelona	Discus
World Championships
Silver medal – second place	1999 Seville	Discus
Bronze medal – third place	1993 Stuttgart	Discus
Bronze medal – third place	1997 Athens	Discus
European Championships
Silver medal – second place	1998 Budapest	Discus throw
Bronze medal – third place	1994 Helsinki	Discus throw
- Updated on 16 June 2015

Jürgen Schult (German pronunciation: [ˈjʏʁɡn̩ ˈʃʊlt]; born 11 May 1960) is a German former track and field athlete and, from 1986 until 2024, the world record holder in the discus throw. Schult represented East Germany in the 1988 Olympic discus competition, where he won the gold medal.

== Biography ==
Born in Amt Neuhaus, now in Lower Saxony, Schult was unable to compete in the 1984 Summer Olympics in Los Angeles due to his country's boycott of the games.

He set a world record in the discus in 1986. As an athlete under the East German program, his throw of 74.08 meters (243.0 ft) bested the previous record of Soviet athlete, Yuriy Dumchev, of 71.86 meters (235.8 ft). This discus world record was one of the longest-standing men's world records ever (having surpassed the length of Jesse Owens' long jump record, which stood for 25 years and 79 days) but eventually fell 37 years and 9 months later to Mykolas Alekna throwing 74.35 meters (243.9 ft).

In 1988, at the first ever track and field competition between East and West Germany, Schult refused to shake hands with his former teammate, Wolfgang Schmidt, after beating him; Schmidt had very shortly before moved from East to West Germany.

Later in his long sports career, Schult joined the reunified German team. He competed in a second Olympic Games in 1992, getting a silver medal, and the 1999 World Championships, again getting second place. He competed in his final Olympics in 2000 at the age of 40, finishing in eighth place.

Schult has a degree in sport, and in 2002 became the trainer of the German track and field association's men's discus team.

At the East German championships, he won every edition from 1983 until its last staging in 1990. He represented the club SC Traktor Schwerin. He trained with Dr. Hermann Brandt, later he represented the Schwerin and Riesa sports clubs and trained with Thomas Schult. While he was actively competing, he was 1.93 meters tall and weighed 110 kilograms.

== International competitions ==
Year	Competition	Venue	Position	Notes
Representing East Germany
1979	European Junior Championships	Bydgoszcz, Poland	1st	56.18 m (Note: 1.75 kg discus)
1983	World Championships	Helsinki, Finland	5th	64.92 m
1986	European Championships	Stuttgart, West Germany	7th	64.38 m
1987	World Championships	Rome, Italy	1st	68.74 m
1988	Olympic Games	Seoul, South Korea	1st	68.82 m
1990	European Championships	Split, Yugoslavia	1st	64.58 m
Representing Germany
1991	World Championships	Tokyo, Japan	6th	63.12 m
1992	Olympic Games	Barcelona, Spain	2nd	64.94 m
1993	World Championships	Stuttgart, Germany	3rd	66.12 m
1994	European Championships	Helsinki, Finland	3rd	64.18 m
1995	World Championships	Gothenburg, Sweden	5th	64.44 m
1996	Olympic Games	Atlanta, United States	6th	64.62 m
1997	World Championships	Athens, Greece	3rd	66.14 m
1998	European Championships	Budapest, Hungary	2nd	66.69 m
1999	World Championships	Seville, Spain	2nd	68.18 m
2000	Olympic Games	Sydney, Australia	8th	64.41 m

Records
Preceded by Yuriy Dumchev	Men's Discus World Record Holder; 6 June 1986 – 14 April 2024	Succeeded by Mykolas Alekna
