= Andriy Kokhanovsky =

Ukrainian discus thrower

Personal information
- Nationality: Ukrainian
- Born: 11 January 1968 (age 58)

Sport
- Sport: Athletics
- Event: Discus throw

Andriy Kokhanovsky (born 11 January 1968) is a Ukrainian athlete. He competed in the men's discus throw at the 1996 Summer Olympics.
