= Svein Inge Valvik =

Norwegian discus thrower (born 1956)

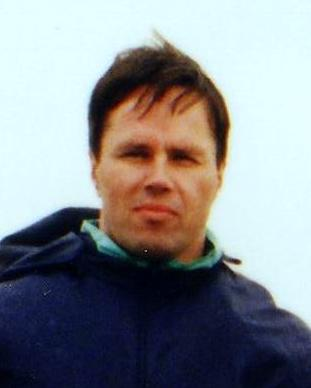
Svein Inge Valvik

Svein Inge Valvik (born 20 September 1956) is a retired Norwegian discus thrower. He represented SK Vidar, IF Kamp-Vestheim, IK Tjalve, Stabæk IF and Urædd.

Valvik was an NCAA champion thrower for the UTEP Miners track and field team, winning the discus at the 1977 NCAA Division I Outdoor Track and Field Championships.

He finished seventh in the discus final at the 1994 European Championships with a throw of 62.02 metres. He competed at the 1988 and 1996 Summer Olympics as well as the World Championships in 1987, 1991 and 1995 without reaching the final. He became Norwegian champion in discus throw in the years 1977, 1985 and 1990-1996.

His personal best throw was 68.00 metres, achieved in May 1982 in Juárez. This makes him the second best discus thrower in Norwegian history after Knut Hjeltnes.

He currently works as a teacher at Porsgrunn Videregående Skole.

== Achievements ==
Year	Competition	Venue	Position	Event	Notes
Representing Norway
1988	Olympic Games	Seoul, South Korea	14th	Discus	60.64 m
1990	European Championships	Split, Yugoslavia	13th (q)	Discus	60.34 m
1994	European Championships	Helsinki, Finland	7th	Discus	62.02 m
