= Anil Kumar (discus thrower) =

Indian discus thrower (born 1975)

Personal information
- Nationality: Indian
- Born: 20 June 1975 (age 51) Dhigawa Jattan, Haryana, India
- Years active: 1991-present
- Employer: Oil and Natural Gas Corporation
- Height: 190 cm (6 ft 3 in)

Sport
- Sport: Track and field
- Event: Discus throw

Achievements and titles
- Personal best: 64.37 m
Medal record
Men's athletics
Representing India
Asian Games
Silver medal – second place	1998 Bangkok	Discus throw
Bronze medal – third place	2002 Busan	Discus throw
Asian Championships
Gold medal – first place	2000 Jakarta	Discus throw
Bronze medal – third place	2003 Manila	Discus throw
Afro-Asian Games
Gold medal – first place	2003 Hyderabad	Discus throw
- Updated on 18 May 2022

Anil Kumar (born 20 June 1975) is a well renowned Indian male discus thrower with his personal best throw of 64.37 metres attained in July, 2004 in Szombathely, Hungary. He received Arjuna Award in 2004 for his performances at Asia level. He is also bestowed with the Bhim Award by State Government of Haryana. He led the Indian athletics contingent for Asian Athletics Grand Prix Series held at Colombo, Bangkok and Manila in June 2003.

== Career ==
=== International level performances ===
Anil Kumar won silver medal in the Asian Games, 1998 held at Bangkok, Thailand. In the Asian Championship held in 2000 at Jakarta, Indonesia, he bagged a gold medal. He also won bronze medal in the 2002 Asian Games held at Busan, South Korea. In the following year, he won bronze medal in the Asian Championship held at Manila, Philippines and secured Gold in the Afro-Asian Games held in Hyderabad, India. Anil Kumar participated in the Summer Olympic Games in 2004 after achieving 'A' standard qualification. He was declared best athlete of 'Asli Kozar Memorial Meet' held in Varaždin, Croatia in July 2004 in the run-up for the Athens Olympics where he hurled the discus to a distance of 63.88 metres. Apart from winning several international competitions in Europe, Anil Kumar also won 3 Silver and 1 Bronze medal in Asian Grand Prix Series held in Hyderabad, Colombo, Bangkok and Manila in 2003.

=== Performance during 2004 Athens Olympics ===
Anil Kumar came up with two foul throws in the qualification round before being stretchered off following a muscle injury. The national record holder and medal winner at the last two Asian Games, who had a 64.37m effort in Hungary barely two weeks before the start of the Olympics and on whose training the government spent close to INR 16 lakhs, did not attempt a third try as that could have aggravated the injury. According to Lalit Bhanot, secretary of the Athletics Federation of India, "Anil pulled a muscle in the left abductor during his first throw and then tried a second, which was also foul. He then decided to skip the third to avoid aggravating the injury.

=== National level performances ===
Only 2 Indians, Anil Kumar and Vikas Gowda have crossed the 62 metres mark in discus throw so far. All time 10 best performances of Anil Kumar are above the 61 metres mark. He has the distinction of throwing the discus to above the 62 metres mark in 5 competitions, 60 metres and above in 17 competitions, 57 metres and above in 44 and above the 55 metres mark in 50 competitions. Anil Kumar's 22 year old meet record (59.55 metres) of National Federation Cup was broken by Kripal Singh on 5 April 2022, with a distance of 61.86 metres On 29 September 2003, Anil Kumar created a new meet record at the 43rd Indian National Open Athletics Championships held in Bangalore with a creditable 60.07 metres at the Sree Kanteerava Stadium. The previous record of 57.70 mark was held by Shakti Singh (athlete). The record of Open National Athletic Championships still stands in the name of Anil Kumar till date (as of 7 September 2021).

=== National record for discus throw ===
Anil created new national record with a distance of 64.37 metres in 2004 in Szombathely, Hungary surpassing Vikas Gowda's record of 64.35 metres. Prior to that, the national record of 61.72 metres was held by Shakti Singh since 1994. Vikas reclaimed the record in 2005 by achieving 64.69 meters mark in Charlotte, USA. The current national record of 66.28 meters was also set by Vikas Gowda at the Old Style Discus Challenge in the United States in 2012.

== Doping allegations ==
In 2007 Kumar was found guilty of norandrosterone doping. The sample was delivered in an in-competition test at the 2005 Asian Championships in Incheon. He received an IAAF suspension from September 2005 to September 2007, meaning that his suspension was already over when announced. Additionally he was disqualified from the competition where he originally had won a bronze medal.

== International competitions ==
Year	Competition	Venue	Position	Notes
Representing India
1998	Asian Games	Bangkok, Thailand	second	
2000	Asian Championships	Djakarta, Indonesia	first	
2002	Asian Games	Busan, South Korea	third	59.81 m
2003	Asian Championships	Manila, Philippines	third	
2003	Afro-Asian Games	Hyderabad, India	1st	
2004	Olympic Games	Athens, Greece	—	NM
2005	Asian Championships	Incheon, South Korea	DSQ	see above

== See also ==
- Doping cases in athletics
