= Anthony Washington (discus thrower) =

American discus thrower

Personal information
- Born: January 16, 1966 (age 60) Glasgow, Montana, U.S.

Sport
- Sport: Athletics
- Event: Discus throw
- University team: Syracuse
Medal record
Men's athletics
Representing United States
World Athletics Championships
Gold medal – first place	Seville 1999	Discus throw
Pan American Games
Gold medal – first place	Havana 1991	Discus throw
Gold medal – first place	Winnipeg 1999	Discus throw
IAAF World Cup
Gold medal – first place	Havana 1992	Discus throw
Universiade
Silver medal – second place	Sheffield 1991	Discus throw

Anthony Washington (born January 16, 1966) is an American former discus thrower, who competed in three consecutive Summer Olympics. At the 1999 World Championships in Seville, Washington won the gold medal in discus throw.

Washington attended Syracuse University, graduating in 1990, where he was a part of the men's track and field team.

His personal bests are 71.14 m in discus and 59.58 m in hammer throw. He is a four-time national champion in the men's discus event.

He once appeared in a Snickers Olympics candy bar commercial.

== International competitions ==
Year	Competition	Venue	Position	Event	Notes
1991	Pan American Games	Havana, Cuba	1st	Discus	
1992	Olympic Games	Barcelona, Spain	12th	Discus	
1993	World Championships	Stuttgart, Germany	10th	Discus	
1996	Olympic Games	Atlanta, USA	4th	Discus	
1999	World Championships	Seville, Spain	1st	Discus	
1999	Pan American Games	Winnipeg, Canada	1st	Discus	
2000	Olympic Games	Sydney, Australia	12th	Discus	
