= Adewale Olukoju =

Nigerian athlete (born 1968)

Personal information
- Born: 27 July 1968 (age 58) Zaria, Nigeria

Sport
- Sport: Track and field
Medal record
Representing Nigeria
African Championships
Gold medal – first place	1988 Annaba	Discus throw
Gold medal – first place	1992 Belle Vue Harel	Discus throw
Bronze medal – third place	1988 Annaba	Shot put
Bronze medal – third place	1992 Belle Vue Harel	Shot put
Summer Universiade
Gold medal – first place	1991 Sheffield	Discus throw
Silver medal – second place	1993 Buffalo	Discus throw

Adewale Oluson Olukoju (born 27 July 1968) is a Nigerian athlete who competed in discus throw and shot put. He was very prominent in African athletics in the late 1980s and early 1990s, winning four gold medals in total at the All-Africa Games.

His personal best discus throw is 67.80 metres, which he achieved in May 1991. Olukoju is married to sprinter Fatima Yusuf.

== International competitions ==
Representing Nigeria
Year	Competition	Venue	Position	Event	Notes
1986	World Junior Championships	Athens, Greece	6th	Shot put	17.19 m
1986	World Junior Championships	Athens, Greece	7th	Discus	54.00 m
1987	All-Africa Games	Nairobi, Kenya	1st	Discus	56.50 m
1987	All-Africa Games	Nairobi, Kenya	1st	Shot put	18.13 m
1988	African Championships	Annaba, Algeria	1st	Discus	62.12 m
1988	African Championships	Annaba, Algeria	3rd	Shot put	17.70 m
1988	Olympic Games	Seoul, South Korea	23rd	Discus	54.44 m
1991	All-Africa Games	Cairo, Egypt	1st	Discus	59.22 m
1991	All-Africa Games	Cairo, Egypt	2nd	Shot put	17.58 m
1991	Summer Universiade	Sheffield, United Kingdom	1st	Discus	61.48 m
1991	World Championships	Tokyo, Japan	11th	Discus	59.44 m
1992	African Championships	Belle Vue Maurel, Mauritius	1st	Discus	60.66 m
1992	African Championships	Belle Vue Maurel, Mauritius	3rd	Shot put	17.06 m
1993	Summer Universiade	Buffalo, United States	2nd	Discus	62.96 m
1995	World Championships	Gothenburg, Sweden	6th	Discus	63.66 m
1995	All-Africa Games	Harare, Zimbabwe	1st	Discus	61.68 m
