= Attila Horváth (discus thrower) =

Hungarian discus thrower (1967–2020)

Attila Horváth (28 July 1967 – 13 November 2020) was a discus thrower from Hungary.

== Biography ==
He represented his native country at two consecutive Summer Olympics (1992 and 1996). His personal best was 68.58 metres, thrown on 24 June 1994 in Budapest. He was a nine-time national champion in the men's discus event, including eight in a row (1990–1997).

Horváth was born in Kőszeg and died in Szombathely, of complications from COVID-19 on 13 November 2020, at age 53.

== Achievements ==
Year	Competition	Venue	Position	Notes
Representing Hungary
1986	World Junior Championships	Athens, Greece	5th	58.04 m
1990	European Championships	Split, Yugoslavia	8th	62.08 m
1991	World Championships	Tokyo, Japan	3rd	65.32 m
1992	Olympic Games	Barcelona, Spain	5th	62.82 m
1994	European Championships	Helsinki, Finland	5th	63.60 m
1995	World Championships	Gothenburg, Sweden	4th	65.72 m
1996	Olympic Games	Atlanta, United States	10th	62.28 m

== Awards ==
- Hungarian athlete of the Year (1): 1994

== Sources ==
- IAAF Profile
