= Nick Sweeney =

Irish discus thrower

Personal information
- Nationality: Irish
- Born: 26 March 1968 (age 58) Dublin, Ireland
- Height: 198 cm (6 ft 6 in)
- Weight: 120 kg (265 lb)

Sport
- Sport: Athletics
- Event: Discus throw
- Club: DSD AC, Dublin / Belgrave Harriers
Medal record
Representing Ireland
Summer Universiade
Bronze medal – third place	1993 Buffalo	Discus throw

Competition record

Discus

Representing Ireland

Olympic Games
Qualified	1992 Summer Olympic Games
Qualified	1996 Summer Olympic Games
Qualified	2000 Summer Olympic Games
Qualified	2004 Summer Olympic Games

European Athletics Championships
4th	1994 European Athletics Championships

British National Championships (AAA)
1st	1995

Irish National Championships
1st	1987
1st	1991
1st	1992
1st	1993
1st	1994
1st	1995
1st	1996
1st	1997
1st	1999
1st	2000

Nicholas Sweeney (born 26 March 1968) is a retired Irish discus thrower who represented his native country in four consecutive Summer Olympics, starting 1992 (Barcelona, Spain). He is the current Irish national record holder in the discus (67.89 m) and won a total number of ten Irish national discus titles (1987, 1991–1997, 1999–2000). He finished 6th at the 1993 World Championships in Stuttgart.

== Biography ==
Sweeney went to school in Wesley College, Dublin where he was introduced to athletics and discus throwing through the then P.E. coach Dan Kennedy. Sweeney showed promise early on and eventually became the Irish schools record holder at senior level. After finishing his school studies he took a year out before traveling to the United States, to Harvard College where he completed a four-year degree. While there, Sweeney competed for the Harvard Crimson track and field team in the NCAA.

As an athlete, Sweeney was affiliated to DSD AC, Dublin and Belgrave Harriers, Wimbledon (in England).

Sweeney won the British AAA Championships title at the 1995 AAA Championships.

He presently lives and works in Boston, USA.

== Achievements ==
Year	Competition	Venue	Position	Notes
Representing Ireland
1994	European Championships	Helsinki, Finland	4th	63.76 m
1998	European Championships	Budapest, Hungary	13th	60.36 m
2000	Olympic Games	Sydney, Australia	36th	57.37 m
