= Mike Buncic =

American discus thrower

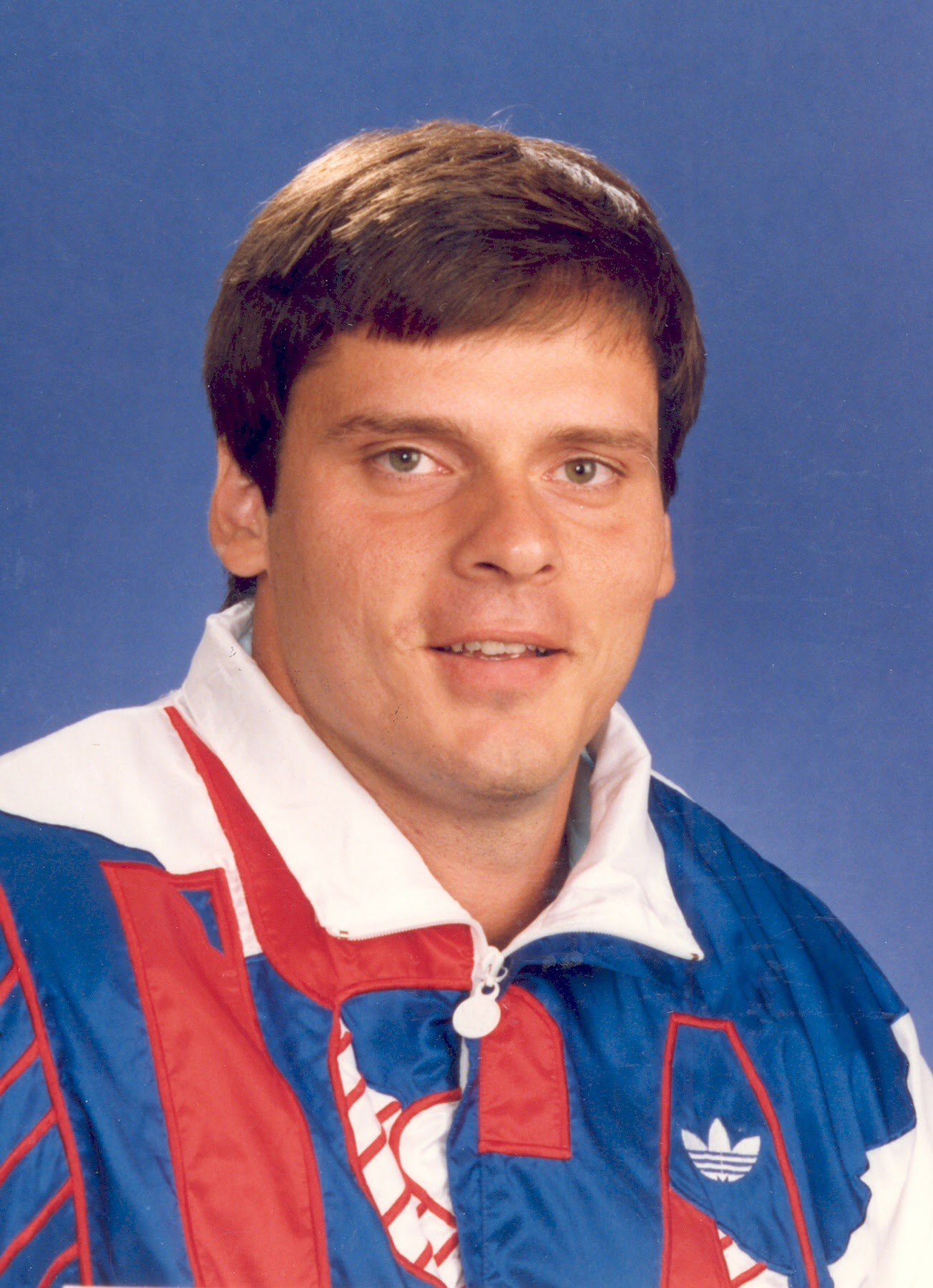

Personal information
- Born: July 25, 1962 (age 64) Paterson, New Jersey, United States

Sport
- Sport: Track and field

Michael Buncic (born July 25, 1962) is an American discus thrower who is a two time US Olympian and former NCAA record holder in the men's discus throw. Born to Yugoslavian parents he represented the US in international competition. He participated at the 1988 and 1992 Summer Olympics. In addition he competed in three World Track and Field Championships representing the United States, 1991 Tokyo, Japan, 1993 Stuttgart, Germany, and 1995 Goteborg, Sweden. He is a four time Olympic and World Championship finalist in the Men's Discus Throw.

Buncic had the world's longest Discus Throw for the 1991 season on April 4, 1991, of 227'7" at Fresno, California. He was the US National Champion in 1995. This US championship followed having previously finished as runner-up a total of six times. He retired from competition in 1996.

Buncic competed for the University of Kentucky where he was a multiple SEC Champion, record holder, and All-American in the shot put and discus throw. He represented the US in the World University Games twice; 1985, Kobe, Japan; 1987, Zagreb, Yugoslavia.

He was the US National Junior Champion in the Discus Throw in 1981.

He holds a Masters of Science degree in Molecular Biology from San Jose State University.

Buncic is now a human physiology teacher at Wilcox High School in Santa Clara, California.

== International competitions ==
Year	Competition	Venue	Position	Event	Notes
Representing the United States
1986	Goodwill Games	Moscow, Soviet Union	7th	Discus	61.34 m
1988	Olympic Games	Seoul, South Korea	10th	Discus	62.46 m
1990	Goodwill Games	Seattle, United States	3rd	Discus	62.06 m
1991	IAAF World Athletics Championships	Tokyo, Japan	5th	Discus	64.20 m
1992	Olympic Games	Barcelona, Spain	18th	Discus	59.12 m
1993	IAAF World Athletics Championships	Stuttgart, Germany	8th	Discus	
1995	IAAF World Athletics Championships	Goteborg, Sweden	11th	Discus	
