= Volodymyr Zinchenko =

Ukrainian discus thrower (born 1959)

Volodymyr Zinchenko (Ukrainian: Володимир Іванович Зінченко; born 28 May 1959 in Zaporizhya) is a former discus thrower from Ukraine, who represented the Unified Team at the 1992 Summer Olympics and Ukraine in 1996 Summer Olympics. He is a three-time national champion for Ukraine and four-time champion of the Soviet Union in the men's discus throw event. His first name is also spelled in Ukrainian as Volodymyr.

His personal best is 68.88, which is also Ukraine's national record.
