= Costel Grasu =

Romanian discus thrower

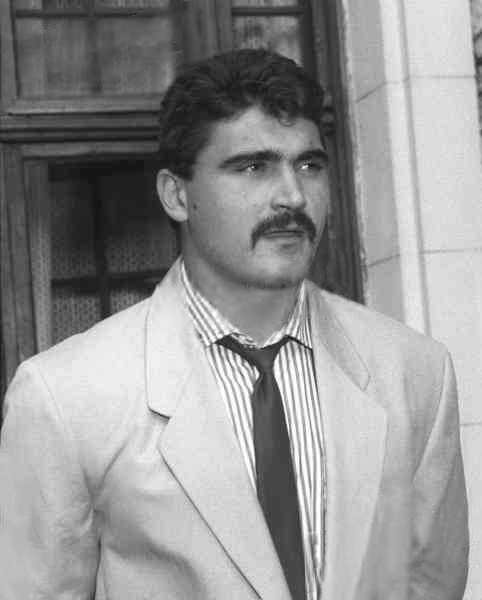
Costel Grasu, 1992

Costel Grasu (born 5 June 1967 in Fetești, Ialomița) is a Romanian discus thrower.

He is perhaps best known for finishing fourth at the 1992 Summer Olympics. He also competed at the Olympics in 1996 and 2000, without reaching the final. Other achievements include gold medals at the Jeux de la Francophonie in 1994 and 1997 as well as gold medals at the Balkan Games in 1992 and 1997. His personal best throw is 67.08 metres, achieved in Snagov in May 1992.

Costel Grasu is married to Nicoleta Grasu, née Grădinaru. Their son Ștefan Grasu is a professional basketball player.

== Achievements ==
Year	Competition	Venue	Position	Notes
Representing Romania
1994	European Championships	Helsinki, Finland	8th	61.40 m
2000	Olympic Games	Sydney, Australia	—	NM
