= Vésteinn Hafsteinsson =

Icelandic discus thrower

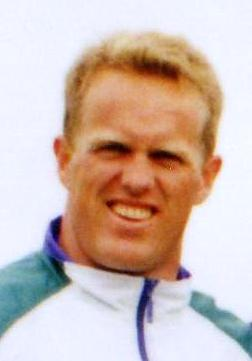
Vésteinn Hafsteinsson, 1994

Vésteinn Hafsteinsson (born 12 December 1960) is a retired discus thrower from Iceland. He was born in Selfoss, and represented his native country at four consecutive Summer Olympics, starting in 1984. His personal best is 67.64 metres, thrown on 31 May 1989 in Selfoss. Vésteinn competed in five consecutive World Championships, starting in 1983, but never reached the final. He previously coached World and Olympic champion Gerd Kanter, Olympic silver medalist Joachim B. Olsen, as well Daniel Ståhl and Simon Pettersson, the gold and silver medalists, respectively, at the Tokyo Olympics.

Hafsteinsson was an All-American thrower for the Alabama Crimson Tide track and field team, finishing 4th in the discus at the 1984 NCAA Division I Outdoor Track and Field Championships and 1986 NCAA Division I Outdoor Track and Field Championships.

== Achievements ==
Year	Competition	Venue	Position	Notes
Representing Iceland
1983	World Championships	Helsinki, Finland	—	55.20 m
1984	Olympic Games	Los Angeles, United States	14th	DSQ
1987	World Championships	Rome, Italy	—	59.32 m
1988	Olympic Games	Seoul, South Korea	19th	58.94 m
1990	European Championships	Split, Yugoslavia	12th	57.36 m
1991	World Championships	Tokyo, Japan	—	60.12 m
1992	Olympic Games	Barcelona, Spain	11th	60.06 m
1993	World Championships	Stuttgart, Germany	—	58.56 m
1994	European Championships	Helsinki, Finland	14th (q)	57.18 m
1995	World Championships	Gothenburg, Sweden	—	58.12 m
1996	Olympic Games	Atlanta, United States	32nd	56.30 m
