= 2019 World Athletics Championships – Men's discus throw =

Men's discus throw at the 2019 World Championships
- Venue: Khalifa International Stadium
- Dates: 28 September (qualification); 30 September (final)
- Competitors: 33 from 23 nations
- Winning distance: 67.59

Medalists
gold medal	Daniel Ståhl	Sweden
silver medal	Fedrick Dacres	Jamaica
bronze medal	Lukas Weißhaidinger	Austria

The men's discus throw at the 2019 World Athletics Championships was held at the Khalifa International Stadium in Doha from 28 to 30 September 2019.

== Summary ==
Coming in to these championships, Daniel Ståhl dominated the season both with the best throw and the best group of throws. A full metre behind him was Fedrick Dacres and Lukas Weißhaidinger was a further two and a half metres behind him. That form held true in the qualifying round as Ståhl was the only automatic qualifier.

As the first thrower, Ståhl set the early standard with a 66.59m. Near the end of the round, Weißhaidinger answered with a 66.74m to take the first round lead. Starting the second round, Ståhl answered back with a 67.18m. Three throws later, Dacres joined the battle with a 66.94m, but that would turn out to be his best of the day. Three throws later Apostolos Parellis joined the 66 metre crowd for the first time adding 63 cm to his national record. The third round saw Ståhl lead off with the winner 67.59 m (221 ft 9 in). Later Weißhaidinger improved his standing to 66.82m. And the last thrower Alin Firfirică displaced Parellis with a 66.46m. With three more rounds in the competition, none of the leaders would improve their position. The podium matched the three world leaders.

== Records ==
Before the competition records were as follows:

World record	Jürgen Schult (GDR)	74.08 m	Neubrandenburg, East Germany	6 June 1986
Championship record	Virgilijus Alekna (LTU)	70.17 m	Helsinki, Finland	7 August 2005
World Leading	Daniel Ståhl (SWE)	71.86 m	Bottnaryd, Sweden	29 June 2019
African Record	Frantz Kruger (RSA)	70.32 m	Salon-de-Provence, France	26 May 2002
Asian Record	Ehsan Hadadi (IRI)	69.32 m	Tallinn, Estonia	3 June 2008
North, Central American and Caribbean record	Ben Plucknett (USA)	71.32 m	Eugene, United States	4 June 1983
South American Record	Jorge Balliengo (ARG)	66.32 m	Rosario, Argentina	15 April 2006
European Record	Jürgen Schult (GDR)	74.08 m	Neubrandenburg, East Germany	6 June 1986
Oceanian record	Benn Harradine (AUS)	68.20 m	Townsville, Australia	10 May 2013

== Qualification standard ==
The standard to qualify automatically for entry was 65.00 m.

== Schedule ==
The event schedule, in local time (UTC+3), was as follows:

Date	Time	Round
28 September	16:15	Qualification
30 September	21:15	Final

== Results ==
=== Qualification ===
Qualification: Qualifying Performance 65.60 (Q) or at least 12 best performers (q) advanced to the final.

Rank	Group	Name	Nationality	Round			Mark	Notes
Rank	Group	Name	Nationality	1	2	3	Mark	Notes
1	B	Daniel Ståhl	Sweden	x	67.88		67.88	Q
2	A	Fedrick Dacres	Jamaica	65.44	64.26	x	65.44	q
3	B	Matthew Denny	Australia	64.48	60.94	65.08	65.08	q
4	A	Alin Firfirică	Romania	64.55	65.05	x	65.05	q
5	B	Ehsan Haddadi	Iran	64.84	63.05	61.29	64.84	q
6	B	Ola Stunes Isene	Norway	58.43	64.54	63.33	64.54	q
7	A	Apostolos Parellis	Cyprus	64.03	x	64.50	64.50	q
8	B	Andrius Gudžius	Lithuania	64.14	63.28	x	64.14	q
9	B	Sam Mattis	United States	x	63.96	60.89	63.96	q
10	A	Simon Pettersson	Sweden	63.65	61.98	62.43	63.65	q
11	A	Martin Wierig	Germany	60.63	63.65	62.03	63.65	q
12	A	Lukas Weißhaidinger	Austria	59.94	63.31	60.77	63.31	q
13	A	Mason Finley	United States	x	63.22	x	63.22	
14	B	Christoph Harting	Germany	60.31	62.04	63.08	63.08	
15	B	Traves Smikle	Jamaica	62.24	62.25	62.93	62.93	
16	A	David Wrobel	Germany	62.43	61.47	x	62.43	
17	A	Piotr Małachowski	Poland	x	62.20	61.63	62.20	
18	A	Danijel Furtula	Montenegro	x	x	62.12	62.12	
19	A	Martin Kupper	Estonia	x	62.10	61.71	62.10	
20	B	Mauricio Ortega	Colombia	61.92	x	x	61.92	
21	B	Alex Rose	Samoa	61.80	x	x	61.80	
22	B	Bartłomiej Stój	Poland	x	61.21	61.79	61.79	
23	B	Robert Urbanek	Poland	61.55	61.78	61.35	61.78	
24	B	Aleksey Khudyakov	Authorised Neutral Athletes	61.27	60.52	x	61.27	
25	A	Chad Wright	Jamaica	58.06	60.60	58.58	60.60	
26	B	Jorge Fernández	Cuba	60.52	x	60.60	60.60	
27	A	Brian Williams	United States	x	60.48	59.12	60.48	
28	A	János Huszák	Hungary	58.17	54.67	60.45	60.45	
29	A	Philip Milanov	Belgium	60.24	60.05	x	60.24	
30	B	Giovanni Faloci	Italy	58.83	x	59.77	59.77	
31	B	Kristjan Čeh	Slovenia	59.55	x	x	59.55	
32	A	Guðni Valur Guðnason	Iceland	x	53.91	x	53.91	

=== Final ===
The final was started on 30 September at 21:15.

Rank	Name	Nationality	Round						Mark	Notes
Rank	Name	Nationality	1	2	3	4	5	6	Mark	Notes
1st place, gold medalist(s)	Daniel Ståhl	Sweden	66.59	67.18	67.59	65.83	x	67.05	67.59	
2nd place, silver medalist(s)	Fedrick Dacres	Jamaica	64.97	66.94	64.67	63.50	62.85	x	66.94	
3rd place, bronze medalist(s)	Lukas Weißhaidinger	Austria	66.74	x	66.82	x	63.74	66.35	66.82	
4	Alin Firfirică	Romania	63.94	x	66.46	65.19	63.95	64.16	66.46	
5	Apostolos Parellis	Cyprus	64.76	66.32	64.56	x	64.86	65.66	66.32	NR
6	Matthew Denny	Australia	65.43	63.03	x	64.38	x	x	65.43	PB
7	Ehsan Haddadi	Iran	63.80	63.80	62.51	64.29	65.16	63.32	65.16	
8	Martin Wierig	Germany	64.31	x	62.70	x	x	64.98	64.98	
9	Simon Pettersson	Sweden	59.71	61.81	63.72				63.72	
10	Ola Stunes Isene	Norway	62.95	x	63.67				63.67	
11	Sam Mattis	United States	x	63.15	63.42				63.42	
12	Andrius Gudžius	Lithuania	x	61.55	x				61.55	
