= Daniel Ståhl =

Swedish discus thrower

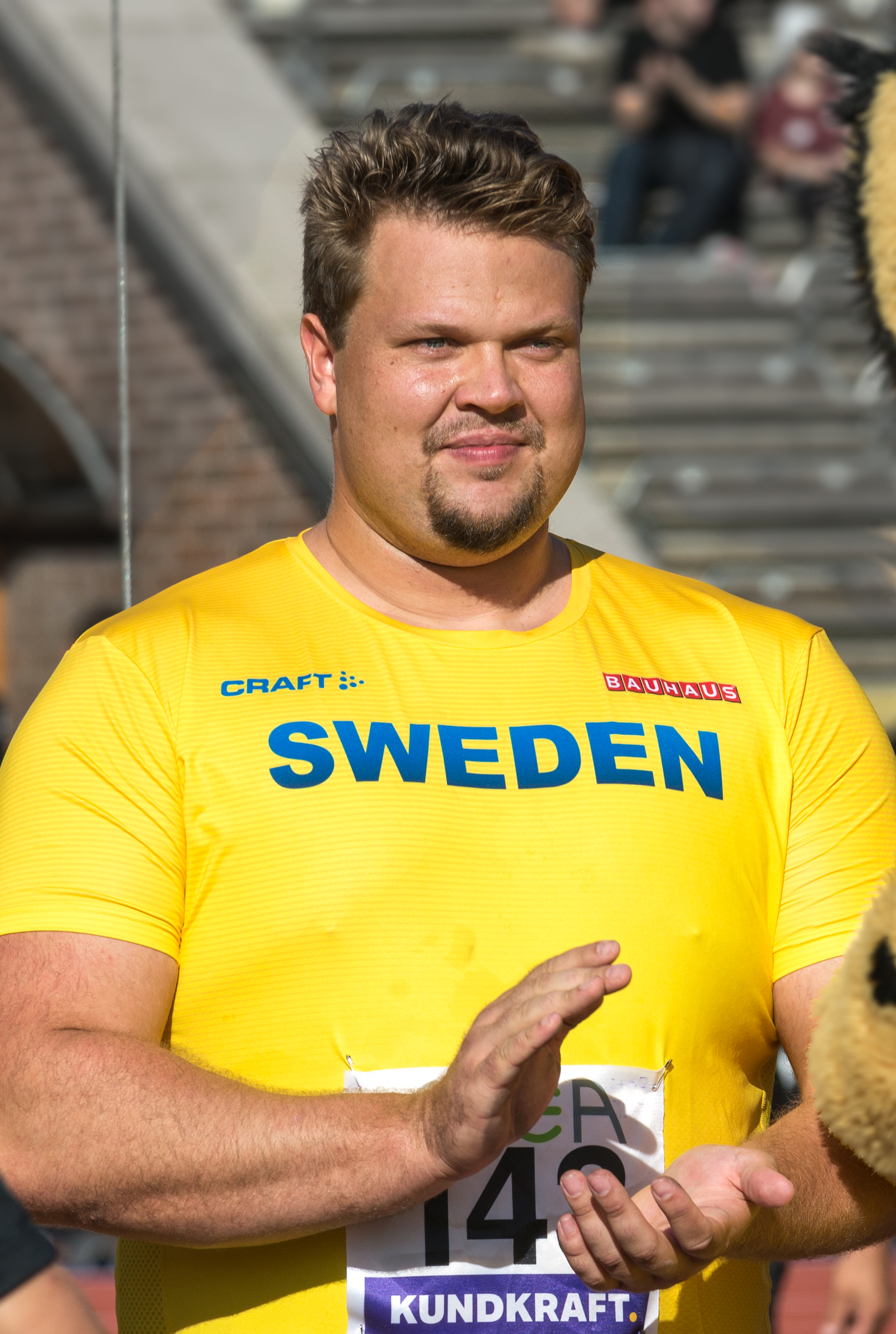
- Ståhl during the Finland-Sweden athletics international 2019 in Stockholm

Personal information
- Nationality: Swedish
- Born: 27 August 1992 (age 34) Solna, Stockholm, Sweden
- Height: 2.00 m (6 ft 7 in)
- Weight: 155 kg (342 lb)

Sport
- Country: Sweden
- Sport: Athletics
- Events: Discus throw, shot put
- Club: Spårvägens FK
Medal record
Men's athletics
Representing Sweden
Olympic Games
Gold medal – first place	2020 Tokyo	Discus throw
World Championships
Gold medal – first place	2019 Doha	Discus throw
Gold medal – first place	2023 Budapest	Discus throw
Gold medal – first place	2025 Tokyo	Discus throw
Silver medal – second place	2017 London	Discus throw
European Championships
Silver medal – second place	2018 Berlin	Discus throw
European Games
Silver medal – second place	2023 Kraków-Małopolska	Discus throw

Daniel Ståhl (born 27 August 1992) is a Swedish athlete specialising in the discus throw. He is an Olympic gold medalist (2020 Tokyo) and a three-time world champion (2019 Doha, 2023 Budapest, 2025 Tokyo), setting the new championships record (71.46 m; 234 ft 5 in) in Budapest.

== Career ==
He competed at the 2015 World Championships in Beijing finishing fifth.

In 2016, he competed at the European Championships, where he finished fifth. Ståhl also competed at the Olympic Games in Rio de Janeiro the same year, where he failed to qualify for the final. Just a couple of weeks following his failure in Rio, Ståhl competed at the Swedish Championships in Sollentuna. Not only did he win the discus throw on a new personal best 68.72 metres, it was also the new world leading throw of 2016, surpassing Christoph Harting's 68.37 metres from the Rio Olympics final. By the end of the year, it remained the number one throw in 2016. The day before, Ståhl had also won the shot put on a new personal best 19.38 metres.

In June 2017, Ståhl managed a throw of 71.29 metres in Sollentuna, setting a new personal best and improving the Swedish record set in 1984 by Ricky Bruch by three centimetres. Ståhl's throw was farther than any discus throw in the world since 2013.

At the 2017 World Championships in Athletics, Ståhl won the silver medal in the discus throw event, throwing 69.19 meters. He was beaten by Lithuanian Andrius Gudžius by 2 centimeters.

He won the silver medal at the 2018 European Championships where he was beaten again by Andrius Gudžius. Ståhl came back in the 2019 World Championships in Doha, Qatar and was crowned World Champion with a winning throw of 67.59 ahead of competitor Federick Dacres.

He won the gold medal at the 2020 Summer Olympics with a throw of 68.90 metres, ahead of his fellow countryman Simon Pettersson.

Daniel Ståhl was awarded the Svenska Dagbladet Gold Medal on 5 December 2023.

Ståhl won the gold medal with a throw of 70.47m at the 2025 World Athletics Championships in Tokyo.

== Competition record ==
Year	Competition	Venue	Position	Event	Notes
Representing Sweden
2009	World Youth Championships	Brixen, Italy	16th (q)	Shot put (5 kg)	18.17 m
2009	World Youth Championships	Brixen, Italy	16th (q)	Discus throw (1.5 kg)	53.94 m
2010	World Junior Championships	Moncton, Canada	27th (q)	Shot put (6 kg)	16.36 m
2011	European Junior Championships	Tallinn, Estonia	20th (q)	Shot put (6 kg)	17.55 m
2011	European Junior Championships	Tallinn, Estonia	–	Discus throw (1.75 kg)	NM
2013	European U23 Championships	Tampere, Finland	4th	Discus throw	61.29 m
2014	European Championships	Zürich, Switzerland	24th (q)	Discus throw	59.01 m
2015	World Championships	Beijing, China	5th	Discus throw	64.73 m
2016	European Championships	Amsterdam, Netherlands	5th	Discus throw	64.77 m
2016	Olympic Games	Rio de Janeiro, Brazil	14th (q)	Discus throw	62.26 m
2017	World Championships	London, United Kingdom	2nd	Discus throw	69.19 m
2018	European Championships	Berlin, Germany	2nd	Discus throw	68.23 m
2019	World Championships	Doha, Qatar	1st	Discus throw	67.59 m
2021	Olympic Games	Tokyo, Japan	1st	Discus throw	68.90 m
2022	World Championships	Eugene, United States	4th	Discus throw	67.10 m
2022	European Championships	Munich, Germany	5th	Discus throw	66.39 m
2023	World Championships	Budapest, Hungary	1st	Discus throw	71.46 m CR
2024	European Championships	Rome, Italy	4th	Discus throw	66.84 m
2024	Olympic Games	Paris, France	7th	Discus throw	66.95 m
2025	World Championships	Tokyo, Japan	1st	Discus throw	70.47 m
2026	European Championships	Birmingham, United Kingdom	4th	Discus throw	68.22 m

== Personal bests ==
Outdoor

- Shot put – 19.38 m ( (Sweden) Sollentuna, 27 August 2016)
- Discus throw: 71.86 m ( (Sweden) Bottnaryd, 29 June 2019)

Indoor

- Shot put – 18.29 m ( (Sweden) Gothenburg, 2015)

== Personal life ==
Ståhl is of partial Finnish descent as his mother is Finnish. His mother Taina Ståhl (née Laakso) is a former discus thrower. Ståhl himself is a fluent Finnish speaker.

== See also ==
- Sweden at the 2015 World Championships in Athletics
