= 2013 European Athletics U23 Championships – Men's discus throw =

The Men's discus throw event at the 2013 European Athletics U23 Championships was held in Tampere, Finland, at Ratina Stadium on 11 and 13 July.

== Medalists ==
Gold	Andrius Gudžius; Lithuania
Silver	Viktor Butenko; Russia
Bronze	Danijel Furtula; Montenegro

== Results ==
=== Final ===
13 July 2013

Rank	Name	Nationality	Attempts						Result	Notes
Rank	Name	Nationality	1	2	3	4	5	6	Result	Notes
1st place, gold medalist(s)	Andrius Gudžius	Lithuania	59.63	62.40	x	57.74	59.84	-	62.40	SB
2nd place, silver medalist(s)	Viktor Butenko	Russia	60.40	62.27	61.76	61.14	x	60.94	62.27	
3rd place, bronze medalist(s)	Danijel Furtula	Montenegro	60.04	60.32	61.24	58.52	61.07	61.61	61.61	
4	Daniel Ståhl	Sweden	x	59.51	58.93	x	61.29	58.85	61.29	SB
5	Philip Milanov	Belgium	56.02	57.21	59.06	58.89	58.38	56.19	59.06	
6	Michael Salzer	Germany	58.63	x	x	56.01	58.28	58.52	58.63	
7	Lukas Weißhaidinger	Austria	57.32	x	55.22	55.58	x	57.97	57.97	
8	David Wrobel	Germany	51.48	57.25	57.18	x	x	x	57.25	
9	Benedikt Stienen	Germany	56.59	x	57.23				57.23	
10	Lolassonn Djouhan	France	54.53	56.98	54.50				56.98	
11	Zane Duquemin	United Kingdom	56.81	x	55.99				56.81	
12	Marek Bárta	Czech Republic	x	54.01	x				54.01	

=== Qualifications ===
Qualified: qualifying perf. 59.50 (Q) or 12 best performers (q) advance to the Final

==== Summary ====
Rank	Name	Nationality	Result	Notes
1	Andrius Gudžius	Lithuania	60.50	Q
2	Viktor Butenko	Russia	59.98	Q
3	Lolassonn Djouhan	France	58.73	q
4	Philip Milanov	Belgium	58.56	q
5	Zane Duquemin	United Kingdom	58.19	q
6	Danijel Furtula	Montenegro	57.96	q
7	Daniel Ståhl	Sweden	57.44	q
8	Lukas Weißhaidinger	Austria	57.24	q
9	Michael Salzer	Germany	57.19	q
10	Marek Bárta	Czech Republic	56.85	q
11	Benedikt Stienen	Germany	56.68	q
12	David Wrobel	Germany	56.57	q
13	Mykyta Nesterenko	Ukraine	56.27	
14	Andrei Gag	Romania	55.98	
15	Wojciech Praczyk	Poland	55.79	
16	Eduardo Albertazzi	Italy	55.72	
17	János Huszák	Hungary	53.64	
18	Michael Klatsias	Cyprus	53.28	
19	Mikael Ljungberg	Sweden	53.20	
20	Olli-Pekka Korhonen	Finland	52.95	
21	Michal Holica	Slovakia	52.38	
22	Paweł Pasiński	Poland	51.64	
23	Andrei Silviu Martin	Romania	50.91	
24	Stefano Petrei	Italy	50.90	
25	Francisco Belo	Portugal	50.38	
26	Blake Thomas Jakobsson	Iceland	48.63	
	Giacomo Grotti	Italy	NM	
	Itamar Levi	Israel	DNS	

==== Details ====
===== Group A =====
11 July 2013 / 17:10

Rank	Name	Nationality	Attempts			Result	Notes
Rank	Name	Nationality	1	2	3	Result	Notes
1	Zane Duquemin	United Kingdom	57.66	57.92	58.19	58.19	q
2	Danijel Furtula	Montenegro	57.59	57.96	x	57.96	q
3	Daniel Ståhl	Sweden	56.96	57.44	56.10	57.44	q
4	Lukas Weißhaidinger	Austria	57.24	56.20	56.59	57.24	q
5	Marek Bárta	Czech Republic	56.85	56.24	x	56.85	q
6	David Wrobel	Germany	55.16	55.73	56.57	56.57	q
7	Mykyta Nesterenko	Ukraine	55.17	x	56.27	56.27	
8	Andrei Gag	Romania	54.95	55.98	x	55.98	
9	Wojciech Praczyk	Poland	54.82	55.79	55.69	55.79	
10	Stefano Petrei	Italy	50.90	x	x	50.90	
11	Francisco Belo	Portugal	x	50.38	49.55	50.38	
12	Blake Thomas Jakobsson	Iceland	x	x	48.63	48.63	
	Giacomo Grotti	Italy	x	x	x	NM	
	Itamar Levi	Israel				DNS	

===== Group B =====
11 July 2013 / 18:40

Rank	Name	Nationality	Attempts			Result	Notes
Rank	Name	Nationality	1	2	3	Result	Notes
1	Andrius Gudžius	Lithuania	60.50			60.50	Q
2	Viktor Butenko	Russia	59.98			59.98	Q
3	Lolassonn Djouhan	France	58.73	56.35	-	58.73	q
4	Philip Milanov	Belgium	56.73	56.70	58.56	58.56	q
5	Michael Salzer	Germany	57.19	x	x	57.19	q
6	Benedikt Stienen	Germany	55.60	56.68	56.02	56.68	q
7	Eduardo Albertazzi	Italy	53.66	55.72	x	55.72	
8	János Huszák	Hungary	52.59	53.64	48.38	53.64	
9	Michael Klatsias	Cyprus	x	53.28	7.08	53.28	
10	Mikael Ljungberg	Sweden	53.20	52.48	x	53.20	
11	Olli-Pekka Korhonen	Finland	51.37	52.95	52.81	52.95	
12	Michal Holica	Slovakia	x	52.38	51.38	52.38	
13	Paweł Pasiński	Poland	51.51	50.00	51.64	51.64	
14	Andrei Silviu Martin	Romania	10.89	50.91	50.02	50.91	

== Participation ==
According to an unofficial count, 27 athletes from 20 countries participated in the event.

- Austria (1)
- Belgium (1)
- Cyprus (1)
- Czech Republic (1)
- Finland (1)
- France (1)
- Germany (3)
- Hungary (1)
- Iceland (1)
- Italy (3)
- Lithuania (1)
- Montenegro (1)
- Poland (2)
- Portugal (1)
- Romania (2)
- Russia (1)
- Slovakia (1)
- Sweden (2)
- Ukraine (1)
- United Kingdom (1)
