= 2010 World Junior Championships in Athletics – Men's discus throw =

The men's discus throw at the 2010 World Junior Championships in Athletics was held at the Moncton 2010 Stadium on 23 & 24 July. A 1.75 kg (junior implement) discus was used.

== Medalists ==
Gold	Silver	Bronze
Andrius Gudžius; Lithuania	Andrei Gag; Romania	Julian Wruck; Australia

== Records ==
Prior to the competition, the existing world junior and championship records were as follows.

	Name	Nationality	Time	Location	Date
World junior record	Mykyta Nesterenko	Ukraine	70.13	Halle (Saale)	May 24, 2008

== Results ==
=== Final ===
24 July

Rank	Name	Nationality	Attempts						Result	Notes
Rank	Name	Nationality	1	2	3	4	5	6	Result	Notes
1st place, gold medalist(s)	Andrius Gudžius	Lithuania	60.80	63.45	62.49	63.41	63.78	x	63.78	
2nd place, silver medalist(s)	Andrei Gag	Romania	61.85	59.93	x	59.77	x	x	61.85	PB
3rd place, bronze medalist(s)	Julian Wruck	Australia	59.88	61.09	60.65	x	60.87	60.55	61.09	
4	Mykyta Nesterenko	Ukraine	58.24	43.55	59.96	60.54	55.94	58.96	60.54	
5	Chad Wright	Jamaica	57.44	60.04	60.33	x	x	58.37	60.33	
6	Lawrence Okoye	United Kingdom	x	48.90	58.49	59.77	59.18	x	59.77	
7	Traves Smikle	Jamaica	x	51.20	58.11	59.59	57.41	55.85	59.59	
8	Michael Salzer	Germany	58.14	x	59.51	x	57.39	x	59.51	
9	David Wrobel	Germany	57.81	56.80	54.62				57.81	
10	Andrew Evans	United States	55.27	56.91	x				56.91	
11	Eduardo Albertazzi	Italy	56.08	53.13	x				56.08	
12	Danijel Furtula	Montenegro	54.64	x	x				54.64	

=== Qualifications ===
23 July

Qualification standard 59.40m or at least best 12 qualified.

==== Group A ====
Rank	Name	Nationality	Attempts			Result	Notes
Rank	Name	Nationality	1	2	3	Result	Notes
1	Julian Wruck	Australia	45.83	45.75	52.47	59.87	Q
2	Traves Smikle	Jamaica	57.82	x	59.59	59.59	Q
3	Lawrence Okoye	United Kingdom	57.24	x	59.56	59.56	Q
4	Michael Salzer	Germany	x	58.57	57.48	58.57	q
5	Danijel Furtula	Montenegro	57.71	53.92	x	57.71	q
6	Andrei Gag	Romania	56.99	x	x	56.99	q
7	Evgeniy Talanovskiy	Russia	55.32	x	56.08	56.08	
8	Michal Mikulicz	Poland	55.85	x	55.70	55.85	
9	Lukas Weisshaidinger	Austria	55.33	x	55.05	55.33	
10	Alex Rose	United States	x	53.46	x	53.46	
11	Mažvydas Butkus	Lithuania	51.47	53.00	52.60	53.00	
12	János Huszák	Hungary	x	x	48.69	52.47	
13	Tan Shen	China	x	52.11	x	52.11	
14	Prabhjot Singh	India	49.39	51.75	50.25	51.75	
15	Itamar Levi	Israel	50.63	51.12	50.16	51.12	
16	Cristian Iovu	Romania	46.78	49.51	48.14	49.51	
17	Juan Caicedo	Ecuador	59.87	-	-	48.69	
	Quincy Wilson	Trinidad and Tobago	x	x	x	NM	

==== Group B ====
Rank	Name	Nationality	Attempts			Result	Notes
Rank	Name	Nationality	1	2	3	Result	Notes
1	Andrius Gudžius	Lithuania	x	55.57	63.14	63.14	Q
2	Mykyta Nesterenko	Ukraine	60.90	-	-	60.90	Q
3	Chad Wright	Jamaica	59.55	-	-	59.55	Q
4	David Wrobel	Germany	58.25	58.48	x	58.48	q
5	Eduardo Albertazzi	Italy	57.59	58.36	-	58.36	q
6	Andrew Evans	United States	54.91	x	57.18	57.18	q
7	Kripal Singh Batth	India	x	54.52	55.84	55.84	
8	Essa Al-Zenkawi	Kuwait	52.87	54.90	x	54.90	
9	Zane Duquemin	United Kingdom	52.86	52.93	54.62	54.62	
10	Dewald van Heerden	South Africa	52.27	54.33	x	54.33	
11	Ben Getemans	Bulgaria	43.35	53.03	54.14	54.14	
12	Andrew Wells	Canada	x	54.05	x	54.05	
13	Amine Atik	Morocco	52.18	x	48.28	52.18	
14	Takumi Inubushi	Japan	50.35	x	49.02	50.35	
15	Michael Klatsia	Cyprus	34.90	x	47.72	47.72	
16	Lolassonn Djouhan	France	x	44.83	42.21	44.83	
	Hamed Mansour	Syria	x	x	x	NM	

== Participation ==
According to an unofficial count, 35 athletes from 28 countries participated in the event.

- Australia (1)
- Austria (1)
- Bulgaria (1)
- Canada (1)
- China (1)
- Cyprus (1)
- Ecuador (1)
- France (1)
- Germany (2)
- Hungary (1)
- India (2)
- Israel (1)
- Italy (1)
- Jamaica (2)
- Japan (1)
- Kuwait (1)
- Lithuania (2)
- Montenegro (1)
- Morocco (1)
- Poland (1)
- Romania (2)
- Russia (1)
- South Africa (1)
- Syria (1)
- Trinidad and Tobago (1)
- Ukraine (1)
- United Kingdom (2)
- United States (2)
