= Athletics at the 2020 Summer Olympics – Men's discus throw =

Men's discus throw at the Games of the XXXII Olympiad
- Olympic Athletics
- Venue: Japan National Stadium
- Dates: 30 July 2021 (qualifying); 31 July 2021 (final)
- Competitors: 32 from 24 nations
- Winning distance: 68.90

Medalists
1st place, gold medalist(s)		Daniel Ståhl	Sweden
2nd place, silver medalist(s)		Simon Pettersson	Sweden
3rd place, bronze medalist(s)		Lukas Weißhaidinger	Austria

The men's discus throw event at the 2020 Summer Olympics took place between 30 and 31 July 2021 at the Japan National Stadium. Approximately 35 athletes were expected to compete; the exact number depended on how many nations use universality places to enter athletes in addition to the 32 qualifying through distance or ranking (no universality places were used in 2016). 32 athletes from 24 nations competed. Daniel Ståhl of Sweden won gold, with his countryman Simon Pettersson earning silver. It was the first victory in the event for Sweden and the first men's discus throw medal of any color for the nation since 1972. Lukas Weißhaidinger took Austria's first-ever Olympic in the men's discus with his bronze.

== Summary ==
Matthew Denny took the early lead with a 65.76 metres in the first round. After almost fouling out of the qualifying round Lukas Weißhaidinger started the second round with a 66.65 metres to take the lead. Shortly afterward, Simon Pettersson almost matched it with a 66.58 metres of his own. The next thrower was his Swedish teammate Daniel Ståhl who launched the winner 68.90 m (226 ft 1/2 in). It turned out to be his only throw of the day good enough to win. In the third, Weißhaidinger would improve to his best of the day 67.07 metres but that couldn't withstand Pettersson's fifth round best of 67.39 metres. Denny would throw a personal best 67.02 metres in the final round, but not enough to get on the medal stand. Not only was it Sweden's first 1–2 finish in the discus, they were the only Swedish medals in the event other than Ricky Bruch's 1972 bronze.

== Background ==
This was the 29th appearance of the event, making it one of 12 athletics events to have been held at every Summer Olympics.

== Qualification ==
A National Olympic Committee (NOC) could enter up to 3 qualified athletes in the men's discus throw event if all athletes meet the entry standard or qualify by ranking during the qualifying period. (The limit of 3 has been in place since the 1930 Olympic Congress.) The qualifying standard is 66.00 metres. This standard was "set for the sole purpose of qualifying athletes with exceptional performances unable to qualify through the IAAF World Rankings pathway." The world rankings, based on the average of the best five results for the athlete over the qualifying period and weighted by the importance of the meet, will then be used to qualify athletes until the cap of 32 is reached.

The qualifying period was originally from 1 May 2019 to 29 June 2020. Due to the COVID-19 pandemic, the period was suspended from 6 April 2020 to 30 November 2020, with the end date extended to 29 June 2021. The world rankings period start date was also changed from 1 May 2019 to 30 June 2020; athletes who had met the qualifying standard during that time were still qualified, but those using world rankings would not be able to count performances during that time. The qualifying time standards could be obtained in various meets during the given period that have the approval of the IAAF. Both outdoor and indoor meets are eligible. The most recent Area Championships may be counted in the ranking, even if not during the qualifying period.

NOCs can also use their universality place—each NOC can enter one male athlete regardless of time if they had no male athletes meeting the entry standard for an athletics event—in the discus throw.

Entry number: 32.

Qualification standard	No. of athletes	NOC	Nominated athletes
Entry standard – 66.00	3	Germany	Daniel Jasinski; Clemens Prüfer; David Wrobel
Entry standard – 66.00	3	Jamaica	Fedrick Dacres; Traves Smikle; Chad Wright
Entry standard – 66.00	3	United States	Mason Finley; Reggie Jagers; Sam Mattis
Entry standard – 66.00	2	Sweden	Simon Pettersson; Daniel Ståhl
Entry standard – 66.00	1	Australia	Matthew Denny
Entry standard – 66.00	1	Austria	Lukas Weißhaidinger
Entry standard – 66.00	1	Belarus	Yauheni Bahutski
Entry standard – 66.00	1	Colombia	Mauricio Ortega
Entry standard – 66.00	1	Cyprus	Apostolos Parellis
Entry standard – 66.00	1	Ecuador	Juan Caicedo
Entry standard – 66.00	1	France	Lolassonn Djouhan
Entry standard – 66.00	1	Great Britain	Lawrence Okoye
Entry standard – 66.00	1	Iran	Ehsan Haddadi
Entry standard – 66.00	1	Italy	Giovanni Faloci
Entry standard – 66.00	1	Lithuania	Andrius Gudžius
Entry standard – 66.00	1	Norway	Ola Stunes Isene
Entry standard – 66.00	1	Poland	Piotr Małachowski
Entry standard – 66.00	1	Romania	Alin Firfirică
Entry standard – 66.00	1	Samoa	Alex Rose
Entry standard – 66.00	1	Slovenia	Kristjan Čeh
Entry standard – 66.00	1	Spain	~~Lois Maikel Martínez~~
Entry standard – 66.00	1	Ukraine	Mykyta Nesterenko
World ranking	1	Montenegro	Danijel Furtula
World ranking	1	Poland	Bartłomiej Stój
Universality places	1	Iceland	Guðni Valur Guðnason
Total	32		

== Competition format ==
The 2020 competition will continue to use the two-round format with divided final introduced in 1936. The qualifying round gives each competitor three throws to achieve a qualifying distance (not yet set; 2016 used 65.50 metres); if fewer than 12 men do so, the top 12 will advance. The final provides each thrower with three throws; the top eight throwers receive an additional three throws for a total of six, with the best to count (qualifying round throws are not considered for the final).

== Records ==
Prior to this competition, the existing world, Olympic, and area records are as follows.

World record	Jürgen Schult (GDR)	74.08	Neubrandenburg, East Germany	6 June 1986
Olympic record	Virgilijus Alekna (LTU)	69.89	Athens, Greece	23 August 2004

Area	Distance (m)	Athlete	Nation
Africa (records)	70.32	Frantz Kruger	South Africa
Asia (records)	69.32	Ehsan Haddadi	Iran
Europe (records)	74.08 WR	Jürgen Schult	East Germany
North, Central America and Caribbean (records)	71.32	Ben Plucknett	United States
Oceania (records)	68.20	Benn Harradine	Australia
South America (records)	70.29	Mauricio Ortega	Colombia

No new records were established during the competition.

== Schedule ==
All times are Japan Standard Time (UTC+9)

The men's discus throw will take place over two separate days.

Date	Time	Round
Friday, 30 July 2021	9:00	Qualifying
Saturday, 31 July 2021	19:00	Final

== Results ==
=== Qualifying ===
Qualification Rules: Qualifying performance 66.00 (Q) or at least 12 best performers (q) advance to the Final.

Rank	Group	Athlete	Nation	1	2	3	Distance	Notes
1	A	Daniel Ståhl	Sweden	66.12			66.12	Q
2	A	Andrius Gudzius	Lithuania	65.94	65.07	x	65.94	q
3	B	Kristjan Čeh	Slovenia	65.45	x	63.34	65.45	q
4	A	Matthew Denny	Australia	61.58	65.13	64.98	65.13	q
5	A	Lukas Weißhaidinger	Austria	x	x	64.77	64.77	q
6	A	Mauricio Ortega	Colombia	61.19	64.49	x	64.49	q
7	B	Simon Pettersson	Sweden	60.62	59.47	64.18	64.18	q
8	A	Sam Mattis	United States	62.31	63.74	63.21	63.74	q, SB
9	A	Daniel Jasinski	Germany	x	61.35	63.29	63.29	q
10	B	Ola Stunes Isene	Norway	61.59	61.84	63.26	63.26	q
11	A	Clemens Prüfer	Germany	62.52	61.45	63.18	63.18	q
12	B	Chad Wright	Jamaica	62.93	60.80	61.37	62.93	q, SB
13	B	Fedrick Dacres	Jamaica	62.91	62.43	x	62.91	
14	B	Bartłomiej Stój	Poland	62.84	61.05	x	62.84	
15	A	Piotr Małachowski	Poland	x	61.76	62.68	62.68	
16	A	Alin Firfirică	Romania	60.42	61.90	x	61.90	
17	B	Apostolos Parellis	Cyprus	61.73	62.11	x	62.11	SB
18	B	Alex Rose	Samoa	61.28	61.72	61.30	61.72	
19	B	Reginald Jagers III	United States	59.33	x	61.47	61.47	
20	B	Mykyta Nesterenko	Ukraine	59.71	60.61	60.95	60.95	
21	A	Lolassonn Djouhan	France	60.74	x	60.57	60.74	
22	B	David Wrobel	Germany	60.38	x	x	60.38	
23	B	Mason Finley	United States	x	x	60.34	60.34	
24	A	Danijel Furtula	Montenegro	59.65	x	59.93	59.93	
25	A	Traves Smikle	Jamaica	59.04	x	x	59.04	
26	A	Ehsan Haddadi	Iran	58.48	58.98	x	58.98	SB
27	B	Yauheni Bahutski	Belarus	58.65	x	x	58.65	
28	A	Juan Caicedo	Ecuador	x	57.75	x	57.75	
29	B	Giovanni Faloci	Italy	x	x	57.33	57.33	
30	B	Lois Maikel Martínez	Spain	x	54.69	x	54.69	
—	A	Lawrence Okoye	Great Britain	x	x	x	-	NM
—	B	Guðni Valur Guðnason	Iceland	x	x	x	-	NM

=== Final ===
Rank	Athlete	Nation	1	2	3	4	5	6	Distance	Notes
1st place, gold medalist(s)	Daniel Ståhl	Sweden	63.72	68.90	65.16	66.10	67.03	64.58	68.90	
2nd place, silver medalist(s)	Simon Pettersson	Sweden	61.39	66.58	x	66.24	67.39	65.39	67.39	
3rd place, bronze medalist(s)	Lukas Weißhaidinger	Austria	62.92	66.65	67.07	66.86	x	x	67.07	
4	Matthew Denny	Australia	65.76	65.53	65.94	65.00	66.06	67.02	67.02	PB
5	Kristjan Čeh	Slovenia	x	62.95	x	66.05	x	66.37	66.37	
6	Andrius Gudžius	Lithuania	64.05	x	63.82	64.11	62.81	x	64.11	
7	Mauricio Ortega	Colombia	61.06	63.51	x	64.08	63.87	x	64.08	
8	Sam Mattis	United States	61.18	63.88	63.14	x	62.39	x	63.88	SB
9	Chad Wright	Jamaica	61.43	61.42	62.56	Did not advance			62.56	
10	Daniel Jasinski	Germany	61.75	62.44	x	Did not advance			62.44	
11	Clemens Prüfer	Germany	61.75	60.73	x	Did not advance			61.75	
12	Ola Stunes Isene	Norway	60.95	61.18	x	Did not advance			61.18	
