= 2013 European Athletics Team Championships Super League =

Athletics team competitions

- Host city: (United Kingdom) Gateshead
- Nations: 12
- Events: 40 (20 men, 20 women)
- Dates: 22–23 June 2013
- Main venue: Gateshead International Stadium

The 2013 European Athletics Team Championships Super League was the Super League of the 4th edition of the European Athletics Team Championships (European Team Championships until 2011 edition), the 2013 European Athletics Team Championships, which took place on 22 and 23 June 2013 in Gateshead, Great Britain. As with the previous championships there were a couple of rules applying specifically to this competition, such as the limit of three attempts in the throwing events, long jump and triple jump (only the top four were allowed the fourth attempt) and the limit of four misses total in the high jump and pole vault.

== Final standings ==
Pos	Country	Pts
1	Germany	352.5
2	Great Britain	343
3	Poland	310.5
4	France	306.5
5	Russia	302.5
6	Ukraine	298.5
7	Italy	268.5
8	Spain	261
9	Turkey	181.5
11	Greece	164
10	Norway	149
12	Belarus	143.5

Note: The competition was originally won by Russia but, after series of doping disqualification and points being reallocated, it was overtaken by Germany, Great Britain, Poland and France.

== Men ==
=== 100 metres ===
Wind:
Heat 1: -0.5 m/s
Heat 2: -4.1 m/s

Rank	Heat	Lane	Name	Nationality	React	Time	Notes	Points
1	2	4	Jimmy Vicaut	France	0.160	10.28		12
2	2	6	Jaysuma Saidy Ndure	Norway	0.154	10.37		11
3	1	7	Kamil Kryński	Poland	0.167	10.40	SB	10
4	2	7	Aleksandr Brednev	Russia	0.151	10.41		9
5	1	6	Martin Keller	Germany	0.153	10.46		8
6	2	2	Richard Kilty	Great Britain	0.142	10.51		7
7	2	5	Michael Tumi	Italy	0.149	10.51		6
8	1	2	İzzet Safer	Turkey	0.159	10.52		5
9	1	4	Eduard Viles	Spain	0.130	10.57		4
10	1	5	Efthímios Steryioúlis	Greece	0.166	10.59		3
11	2	3	Igor Bodrov	Ukraine	0.150	10.63		2
12	1	3	Pavel Kanstantsiuk	Belarus	0.173	10.86		1

=== 200 metres ===
Wind:
Heat 1: +1.7 m/s
Heat 2: +2.4 m/s

Rank	Heat	Lane	Name	Nationality	React	Time	Notes	Points
1	2	4	Christophe Lemaitre	France	0.145	20.27		12
2	2	5	Jaysuma Saidy Ndure	Norway	0.153	20.47		11
3	1	4	Serhiy Smelyk	Ukraine	0.148	20.62	PB	10
4	2	6	Daniel Talbot	Great Britain	0.198	20.67		9
5	2	7	Davide Manenti	Italy	0.154	20.78		8
6	2	2	Sergio Ruiz	Spain	0.140	20.79		7
7	1	6	Likoúrgos-Stéfanos Tsákonas	Greece	0.143	20.79		6
8	2	3	Julian Reus	Germany	0.141	20.97		5
9	1	7	Aliaksandr Linnik	Belarus	0.143	21.05	SB	4
10	1	2	Aleksandr Khyutte	Russia	0.147	21.10		3
11	1	3	Aykut Ay	Turkey	0.141	21.84		2
	1	5	Karol Zalewski	Poland		DQ	FS	0

=== 400 metres ===
Rank	Heat	Lane	Name	Nationality	React	Time	Notes	Points
1	2	7	Vladimir Krasnov	Russia	0.192	45.69	SB	12
2	2	5	Nigel Levine	Great Britain	0.152	45.88		11
3	2	6	David Gollnow	Germany	0.154	45.90		10
4	2	2	Kacper Kozłowski	Poland	0.144	46.52		9
5	1	4	Matteo Galvan	Italy	0.132	46.53		8
6	1	5	Yavuz Can	Turkey	0.183	46.70		7
7	1	3	Pétros Kiriakidis	Greece	0.194	46.73	SB	6
8	2	3	Samuel García	Spain	0.196	46.89		4.5
8	1	6	Yevhen Hutsol	Ukraine	0.166	46.89		4.5
10	2	4	Marc Macedot	France	0.132	47.13		3
11	1	2	Andreas Roth	Norway	0.174	47.46	PB	2
	1	7	Maksim Lipauka	Belarus		DQ		0

=== 800 metres ===
Rank	Name	Nationality	Time	Notes	Points
1	Adam Kszczot	Poland	1:47.27		12
2	İlham Tanui Özbilen	Turkey	1:47.39		11
3	Andrew Osagie	Great Britain	1:47.41		10
4	Pierre-Ambroise Bosse	France	1:47.56		9
5	Giordano Benedetti	Italy	1:48.09		8
6	Andreas Lange	Germany	1:48.40		7
~~7~~	Anis Ananenka	Belarus	~~1:48.42~~	DQ (doping)	0
7	Kevin López	Spain	1:48.71		6
8	Viktor Tyumentsev	Ukraine	1:48.96		5
9	Thomas Roth	Norway	1:49.43		4
10	Konstadínos Nakópoulos	Greece	1:49.94		3
11	Ivan Nesterov	Russia	1:50.27		2

=== 1500 metres ===
Rank	Name	Nationality	Time	Notes	Points
1	İlham Tanui Özbilen	Turkey	3:38.57		12
2	Charlie Grice	Great Britain	3:39.76		11
3	Marcin Lewandowski	Poland	3:39.82		10
4	Carsten Schlangen	Germany	3:39.95		9
5	Adel Mechaal	Spain	3:40.58		8
6	Egor Nikolaev	Russia	3:41.80		7
7	Oleksandr Borysyuk	Ukraine	3:42.41		6
8	Andréas Dimitrákis	Greece	3:43.23		5
9	Simon Denissel	France	3:43.69		4
10	Merihun Crespi	Italy	3:43.92		3
11	Vegard Ølstad	Norway	3:44.08	SB	2
12	Maksim Yuschanka	Belarus	3:44.32	SB	1

=== 3000 metres ===
Rank	Name	Nationality	Time	Notes	Points
1	Bouabdellah Tahri	France	8:05.31		12
2	Halil Akkaş	Turkey	8:05.50		11
3	Valentin Smirnov	Russia	8:05.77		10
4	Oleksandr Borysyuk	Ukraine	8:05.88		9
5	Richard Ringer	Germany	8:05.89		8
6	Krzysztof Żebrowski	Poland	8:06.13	PB	7
7	David Bishop	Great Britain	8:06.18	SB	6
8	Arturo Casado	Spain	8:06.19		5
9	Daniele Meucci	Italy	8:06.46		4
10	Siarhei Platonau	Belarus	8:06.50	SB	3
11	Hans Kristian Fløystad	Norway	8:16.43		2
12	Konstantinos Gkelaouzos	Greece	8:24.79		1

=== 5000 metres ===
Rank	Name	Nationality	Time	Notes	Points
1	Mo Farah	Great Britain	14:10.00		12
2	Bouabdellah Tahri	France	14:12.91		11
3	Kemal Koyuncu	Turkey	14:14.18		10
4	Mykola Labovskyy	Ukraine	14:14.50		9
5	Łukasz Parszczyński	Poland	14:14.68		8
6	Arne Gabius	Germany	14:14.91		7
7	Stefano La Rosa	Italy	14:15.51		6
8	Alemayehu Bezabeh	Spain	14:17.72		5
9	Evgeny Rybakov	Russia	14:19.72		4
10	Siarhei Platonau	Belarus	14:25.82		3
11	Asbjørn Ellefsen Persen	Norway	14:30.28		2
12	Dimos Maggínas	Greece	15:34.74		1

=== 3000 metres steeplechase ===
Rank	Name	Nationality	Time	Notes	Points
1	Tarık Langat Akdağ	Turkey	8:36.25		12
2	Abdelaziz Merzougui	Spain	8:37.22		11
3	Yoann Kowal	France	8:38.76		10
~~4~~	Nikolay Chavkin	Russia	~~8:44.54~~	DQ (doping)	0
4	Steffen Uliczka	Germany	8:45.94		9
5	Vadym Slobodenyuk	Ukraine	8:47.63		8
6	Yuri Floriani	Italy	8:50.63		7
7	Krystian Zalewski	Poland	8:51.50		6
8	Ilya Slavenski	Belarus	8:55.20		5
9	Harald Kårbø	Norway	9:01.74		4
10	Rob Mullett	Great Britain	9:18.75		3
11	Ilias Kassos	Greece	9:53.67		2

=== 110 metres hurdles ===
Wind:
Heat 1: +1.3 m/s
Heat 2: +2.4 m/s

Rank	Heat	Lane	Name	Nationality	React	Time	Notes	Points
1	2	6	Sergey Shubenkov	Russia	0.139	13.19		12
2	2	4	Pascal Martinot Lagarde	France	0.141	13.28		11
3	2	5	Artur Noga	Poland	0.159	13.33		10
4	2	3	Konstadínos Douvalidis	Greece	0.159	13.45		9
5	2	2	William Sharman	Great Britain	0.155	13.46		8
6	1	6	Emanuele Abate	Italy	0.157	13.49	SB	7
7	2	7	Erik Balnuweit	Germany	0.145	13.58		6
8	1	4	Maksim Lynsha	Belarus	0.166	13.76	SB	5
9	1	5	Jackson Quiñónez	Spain	0.153	13.88		4
10	1	7	Vladimir Vukicevic	Norway	0.138	14.05	SB	3
11	1	2	Serhiy Kopanayko	Ukraine	0.137	14.05		2
12	1	3	Mustafa Güneş	Turkey	0.163	14.63		1

=== 400 metres hurdles ===
Rank	Heat	Lane	Name	Nationality	React	Time	Notes	Points
1	2	6	Silvio Schirrmeister	Germany	0.166	49.15	PB	12
2	2	4	Dai Greene	Great Britain	0.164	49.39		11
3	2	5	Mickaël François	France	0.148	49.79		10
4	1	5	Øyvind Kjerpeset	Norway	0.129	49.98	NR	9
5	2	7	Leonardo Capotosti	Italy	0.197	50.30	PB	8
6	1	6	Michał Pietrzak	Poland	0.158	50.84	PB	7
7	2	2	Diego Cabello	Spain	0.190	50.87		6
8	2	3	Ivan Shablyuyev	Russia	0.169	50.93		5
9	1	2	Periklís Iakovákis	Greece	0.216	51.11	SB	4
10	1	4	Denys Nechyporenko	Ukraine	0.203	51.26		3
11	1	3	Mikita Yakaulev	Belarus	0.155	51.77		2
12	1	7	Enis Ünsal	Turkey	0.191	53.25		1

=== 4 × 100 metres relay ===
Rank	Heat	Lane	Name	Nationality	Time	Note	Points
1	2	6	Adam Gemili, Harry Aikines-Aryeetey, James Ellington, James Dasaolu	Great Britain	38.39	EL	12
2	2	5	Roy Schmidt, Sven Knipphals, Julian Reus, Martin Keller	Germany	38.69		11
3	2	7	Artur Zaczek, Grzegorz Zimniewicz, Karol Zalewski, Kamil Kryński	Poland	38.71		10
4	2	3	Emmanuel Biron, Christophe Lemaitre, Jeffrey John, Jimmy Vicaut	France	38.84		9
5	1	4	Michael Tumi, Jacques Riparelli, Davide Manenti, Fabio Cerutti	Italy	39.05		8
6	2	2	Ruslan Perestyuk, Serhiy Smelyk, Igor Bodrov, Vitaliy Korzh	Ukraine	39.11		7
7	2	4	Aleksandr Brednyev, Konstantin Petriashov, Roman Smirnov, Aleksandr Khyutte	Russia	39.26		6
8	1	5	Eduard Viles, Sergio Ruiz, Bruno Hortelano, Adrià Burriel	Spain	39.28		5
9	1	6	İsmail Aslan, Ferhat Altunkalem, Hakan Karacaoğlu, İzzet Safer	Turkey	40.36		4
10	1	2	Panayiótis Andreádis, Lykourgos-Stefanos Tsakonas, Konstadínos Douvalídis, Efthímios Steryioúlis	Greece	40.39		3
	1	3	Viktar Rabau, Aliaksandr Linnik, Ilya Siratsiuk, Pavel Kanstantsiuk	Belarus	DQ		0
	1	7	Nikolai Bjerkan, Peter Osazuwa, Alexander Karlsson, Thomas Wiborg	Norway	DQ		0

=== 4 × 400 metres relay ===
Rank	Heat	Lane	Name	Nationality	Time	Note	Points
1	2	4	Michael Bingham, Conrad Williams, Rhys Williams, Richard Buck	Great Britain	3:05.37	EL	12
2	2	5	Aleksey Kenig, Radel Kashefrazov, Dmitry Buryak, Vladimir Krasnov	Russia	3:06.09		11
3	2	3	Marcin Marciniszyn, Rafał Omelko, Michał Pietrzak, Kacper Kozłowski	Poland	3:06.18		10
4	2	6	David Gollnow, Eric Krüger, Miguel Rigau, Jonas Plass	Germany	3:06.53		9
5	2	7	Marc Macedot, Mame-Ibra Anne, Toumane Coulibaly, Yoann Décimus	France	3:07.18		8
6	1	5	Michele Tricca, Lorenzo Valentini, Isalbet Juarez, Matteo Galvan	Italy	3:07.49		7
7	1	6	Roberto Briones, Mark Ujakpor, Bruno Hortelano, Samuel García	Spain	3:07.54		6
8	2	2	Yevhen Hutsol, Myhaylo Knysh, Vitaliy Butrym, Volodymyr Burakov	Ukraine	3:10.10		5
9	1	3	Pétros Kiriakidis, Dimitrios Gravalos, Athanásios Hatzidimitríou, Ioánnis Loulás	Greece	3:10.46		4
10	1	4	Mehmet Güzel, Buğrahan Kocabeyoğlu, Halit Kiliç, Yavuz Can	Turkey	3:13.10		3
11	1	2	Sondre Nyvold Lid, Øyvind Kjerpeset, Mauritz Kåshagen, Andreas Roth	Norway	3:13.36		2
12	1	7	Mikita Yakaulev, Anis Ananenka, Pavel Kanstantsiuk, Aliaksandr Linnik	Belarus	3:14.95		1

=== High jump ===
Rank	Name	Nationality	2.00	2.05	2.10	2.15	2.20	2.24	2.28	2.31	Mark	Note	Points
1	Bohdan Bondarenko	Ukraine	—	—	—	—	o	—	xo	x	2.28		12
2	Mickael Hanany	France	—	—	o	o	o	xxo	xo	x	2.28		11
3	Tom Parsons	Great Britain	—	—	—	o	o	o	xxx		2.24		10
4	Silvano Chesani	Italy	—	—	o	xo	o	xo	xx		2.24		9
5	Martin Günther	Germany	—	o	xo	o	o	xxx			2.20		8
6	Aleksei Dmitrik	Russia	—	—	o	xxo	xo	x			2.20		7
7	Szymon Kiecana	Poland	—	o	o	o	xxx				2.15		6
8	Adonios Mastoras	Greece	—	—	o	xo	xxx				2.15		5
9	Andrei Churyla	Belarus	—	o	o	xxo	xx				2.15		3.5
9	Miguel Angel Sancho	Spain	o	o	o	xxo	xx				2.15		3.5
11	Kristoffer Nilsen	Norway	o	o	o	xxx					2.10		2
12	Serhat Birinci	Turkey	—	xxo	o	xx					2.10		1

=== Pole vault ===
Rank	Name	Nationality	4.80	5.00	5.20	5.40	5.50	5.60	5.70	5.77	5.84	Mark	Note	Points
1	Renaud Lavillenie	France	—	—	—	—	—	o	—	o	xxx	5.77		12
2	Giuseppe Gibilisco	Italy	—	—	—	o	—	xo	xxx			5.60	=SB	11
3	Björn Otto	Germany	—	—	—	—	o	—	xxx			5.50		10
4	Robert Sobera	Poland	—	—	—	xxo	o	xx				5.50		9
5	Ivan Yeryomin	Ukraine	—	—	o	xxo	xo	x				5.50	=SB	8
6	Konstadinos Filippidis	Greece	—	—	—	o	—	xxx				5.40		7
7	Alexandr Gripich	Russia	—	o	o	xxx						5.20		5.5
7	Igor Bychkov	Spain	—	—	o	x-	xx					5.20		5.5
9	Andrew Sutcliffe	Great Britain	—	xxo	o	xx						5.20		4
10	Eirik Greibrokk Dolve	Norway	o	o	xxo	xx						5.20	PB	3
	Stanislau Tsivonchyk	Belarus	—	—	xx-	x						~~NM~~	DQ (doping)	0

=== Long jump ===
Rank	Name	Nationality	#1	#2	#3	#4	Mark	Notes	Points
1	Aleksandr Menkov	Russia	7.90	8.33	7.82	8.36	8.36		12
2	Louis Tsatoumas	Greece	8.12	x	–	x	8.12	=SB	11
3	Greg Rutherford	Great Britain	7.64	7.98	7.85	8.02	8.02		10
4	Christian Reif	Germany	7.42	7.94	x	x	7.94		9
5	Jean Marie Okutu	Spain	7.88	x	7.47		7.88	SB	8
6	Taras Neledva	Ukraine	7.31	7.80	7.50		7.80		7
7	Salim Sdiri	France	7.38	x	7.55		7.55		6
8	Tomasz Jaszczuk	Poland	7.51	7.53	x		7.53		5
9	Jonas Mögenburg	Norway	x	7.50	7.07		7.50		4
10	Camillo Kabore	Italy	x	7.34	7.39		7.39		3
11	Alper Kulaksız	Turkey	7.29	x	6.91		7.29		2
12	Vadzim Maliankou	Belarus	6.74	7.18	6.86		7.18		1

=== Triple jump ===
Rank	Name	Nationality	#1	#2	#3	#4	Mark	Notes	Points
1	Aleksey Fyodorov	Russia	16.12	13.39	16.70	x	16.70		12
2	Teddy Tamgho	France	16.58	15.93	x	16.62	16.62		11
3	Nathan Douglas	Great Britain	16.02	16.44	x	16.45	16.45		10
4	Dimitrios Tsiamis	Greece	16.30	16.12	x	15.54	16.30		9
5	Viktor Kuznyetsov	Ukraine	16.22	15.98	16.25		16.25		8
6	Fabrizio Schembri	Italy	15.77	16.03	16.24		16.24		7
7	Karol Hoffmann	Poland	15.71	15.79	16.08		16.08		6
8	Vicente Docavo	Spain	13.67	x	15.82		15.82		5
9	Aliaksei Tsapik	Belarus	14.97	15.66	15.19		15.66		4
10	Aşkın Karaca	Turkey	x	15.51	x		15.51		3
11	Manuel Ziegler	Germany	13.60	15.41	15.46		15.46		2
12	Sindre Almsengen	Norway	14.88	15.09	15.21		15.21		1

=== Shot put ===
Rank	Name	Nationality	#1	#2	#3	#4	Mark	Notes	Points
1	David Storl	Germany	19.57	20.47	x	20.15	20.47		12
2	Tomasz Majewski	Poland	x	20.29	20.13	x	20.29		11
3	Alexandr Lesnoy	Russia	19.34	20.27	x	20.05	20.27		10
4	Borja Vivas	Spain	19.09	19.53	x	x	19.53		9
5	Pavel Lyzhyn	Belarus	18.70	19.02	x		19.02		8
6	Hüseyin Atici	Turkey	19.33	19.01	19.23		19.33		7
7	Mihail Stamatoyiannis	Greece	18.21	18.80	x		18.80		6
8	Tumatai Dauphin	France	18.04	18.39	18.62		18.62		5
9	Zane Duquemin	Great Britain	18.13	x	18.50		18.50		4
10	Viktor Samolyuk	Ukraine	18.05	18.07	17.93		18.07		3
11	Marco Dodoni	Italy	16.46	16.73	16.67		16.73		2
12	Stian Andersen	Norway	x	16.05	x		16.05		1

=== Discus throw ===
Rank	Name	Nationality	#1	#2	#3	#4	Mark	Notes	Points
1	Robert Harting	Germany	64.25	64.06	x	63.17	64.25		12
2	Mario Pestano	Spain	61.34	59.63	59.18	60.29	61.34		11
3	Ercüment Olgundeniz	Turkey	59.55	58.02	61.32	x	61.32		10
4	Piotr Małachowski	Poland	57.71	58.78	59.68	x	59.68		9
5	Brett Morse	Great Britain	59.45	x	x		59.45		8
6	Fredrik Amundgård	Norway	50.72	58.05	57.50		58.05		7
7	Giovanni Faloci	Italy	x	x	58.02		58.02		6
8	Pavel Lyzhyn	Belarus	56.24	55.21	x		56.24	SB	5
9	Mykyta Nesterenko	Ukraine	x	52.13	55.34		55.34		4
10	Yeoryios Tremos	Greece	53.51	x	52.84		53.51		3
11	Victor Butenko	Russia	x	x	51.96		51.96		2
12	Lolassonn Djouhan	France	50.08	50.17	45.95		50.17		1

=== Hammer throw ===
Rank	Name	Nationality	#1	#2	#3	#4	Mark	Notes	Points
1	Paweł Fajdek	Poland	77.00	x	74.50	73.15	77.00		12
2	Markus Esser	Germany	76.32	76.01	x	x	76.32		11
~~3~~	Eşref Apak	Turkey	~~75.99~~	~~76.29~~	~~x~~	~~72.88~~	~~76.29~~	DQ (doping)	0
3	Quentin Bigot	France	75.22	74.55	72.99	x	75.22		10
~~4~~	Sergej Litvinov	Russia	~~69.55~~	~~74.17~~	~~70.77~~		~~74.17~~	DQ (doping)	0
4	Yury Shayunou	Belarus	72.31	73.95	73.06		73.95		9
5	Nicola Vizzoni	Italy	61.81	71.29	71.15		71.29		8
6	Eivind Henriksen	Norway	71.24	x	x		71.24		7
7	Javier Cienfuegos	Spain	x	70.65	x		70.65		6
8	Yevhen Vynohradov	Ukraine	65.96	70.47	x		70.47		5
9	Mark Dry	Great Britain	64.42	x	68.30		68.30		4
10	Mihail Anastasakis	Greece	62.60	x	60.75		62.60		3

=== Javelin throw ===
Rank	Name	Nationality	#1	#2	#3	#4	Mark	Notes	Points
1	Dmitry Tarabin	Russia	x	85.99	84.69	x	85.99	PB	12
2	Thomas Röhler	Germany	76.69	80.08	83.31	82.68	83.31		11
3	Roman Avramenko	Ukraine	81.74	81.60	x	x	81.74		10
4	Andreas Thorkildsen	Norway	80.48	80.10	x	x	80.48		9
5	Łukasz Grzeszczuk	Poland	76.63	77.98	78.35		78.35		8
6	Uladzimir Kazlou	Belarus	75.58	75.30	77.44		77.44		7
7	Spiridon Lebesis	Greece	75.48	74.36	74.54		75.48		6
8	Lee Doran	Great Britain	72.76	70.81	73.77		73.77		5
9	Jordi Sanchez	Spain	65.35	71.32	x		71.32	SB	4
10	Fatih Avan	Turkey	x	71.12	—		71.12		3
11	Norbert Bonvecchio	Italy	66.63	65.22	70.16		70.16		2
12	Killian Durechou	France	59.28	64.72	67.30		67.30		1

== Women ==
=== 100 metres ===
Wind:
Heat 1: -4.6 m/s
Heat 2: -4.3 m/s

Rank	Heat	Lane	Name	Nationality	React	Time	Notes	Points
1	2	6	Olesya Povh	Ukraine	0.119	11.51		12
2	1	6	Myriam Soumaré	France	0.162	11.66		11
3	2	5	Tatjana Pinto	Germany	0.156	11.72		10
4	2	7	Yekaterina Kuzina	Russia	0.159	11.73		9
5	2	3	Asha Philip	Great Britain	0.106	11.78		8
6	1	4	Marika Popowicz	Poland	0.151	11.83		7
7	2	2	Ezinne Okparaebo	Norway	0.168	11.88		6
8	2	4	Katsiaryna Hanchar	Belarus	0.170	11.89		5
9	1	2	Nimet Karakuş	Turkey	0.153	11.94		4
10	1	5	Estela García	Spain	0.161	11.95		3
11	1	3	Ilenia Draisci	Italy	0.153	12.08		2
12	1	7	Yeoryía Koklóni	Greece	0.145	12.22		1

=== 200 metres ===
Wind:
Heat 1: -1.8 m/s
Heat 2: -2.8 m/s

Rank	Heat	Lane	Name	Nationality	React	Time	Notes	Points
1	2	6	Mariya Ryemyen	Ukraine	0.163	22.80		12
2	2	4	Myriam Soumaré	France	0.159	23.05		11
3	2	5	Anyika Onuora	Great Britain	0.160	23.12		10
4	2	2	Libania Grenot	Italy	0.157	23.29	SB	9
5	1	7	Estela García	Spain	0.150	23.58	PB	8
6	2	7	Marika Popowicz	Poland	0.150	23.58		7
7	1	4	Inna Weit	Germany	0.168	23.62		6
8	2	3	Yulia Katsura	Russia	0.157	23.87		5
9	1	5	Nimet Karakuş	Turkey	0.190	23.88		4
10	1	3	Katsiaryna Hanchar	Belarus	0.182	24.10	=SB	3
11	1	2	Folake Akinyemi	Norway	0.166	24.27		2
	1	6	Grigoría-Emmanouéla Keramidá	Greece	0.169	DQ		0

=== 400 metres ===
Rank	Heat	Lane	Name	Nationality	React	Time	Notes	Points
1	2	4	Perri Shakes-Drayton	Great Britain	0.191	50.50	EL	12
2	2	5	Kseniya Zadorina	Russia	0.163	51.07		11
3	2	6	Marie Gayot	France	0.178	51.54	PB	10
4	2	2	Libania Grenot	Italy	0.176	51.84	SB	9
5	2	3	Aauri Lorena Bokesa	Spain	0.179	52.50		8
6	2	7	Olha Zemlyak	Ukraine	0.190	52.59		7
7	1	6	Justyna Święty	Poland	0.171	52.79		6
8	1	3	Esther Cremer	Germany	0.143	52.95		5
9	1	4	Ilona Usovich	Belarus	0.202	53.20		4
10	1	5	Line Kloster	Norway	0.156	53.33		3
11	1	7	Birsen Engin	Turkey	0.173	54.07		2
12	1	2	Agní Dervéni	Greece	0.336	56.32		1

=== 800 metres ===
Rank	Name	Nationality	Time	Notes	Points
1	Jessica Judd	Great Britain	2:00.82		12
~~2~~	Yekaterina Sharmina	Russia	~~2:00.86~~	DQ (doping)	0
2	Olha Lyakhova	Ukraine	2:02.30		11
3	Marina Arzamasova	Belarus	2:02.45		10
4	Angelika Cichocka	Poland	2:04.00		9
5	Clarisse Moh	France	2:04.17		8
6	Marta Milani	Italy	2:04.19		7
7	Annett Horna	Germany	2:04.92		6
8	Trine Mjåland	Norway	2:06.27	PB	5
9	Tuğba Karakaya-Koyuncu	Turkey	2:06.53		4
10	María Kládou	Greece	2:07.04		3
11	Khadija Rahmouni	Spain	2:07.65		2

=== 1500 metres ===
Rank	Name	Nationality	Time	Notes	Points
~~1~~	Yekaterina Sharmina	Russia	~~4:08.86~~	DQ (doping)	0
1	Isabel Macías	Spain	4:09.95	SB	12
2	Renata Pliś	Poland	4:10.73		11
3	Margherita Magnani	Italy	4:11.01		10
4	Hannah England	Great Britain	4:11.02		9
5	Olena Zhushman	Ukraine	4:11.77	PB	8
6	Elina Sujew	Germany	4:13.27		7
7	Tuğba Karakaya-Koyuncu	Turkey	4:14.95		6
~~9~~	Natallia Kareiva	Belarus	~~4:15.43~~	DQ (doping)	0
8	Laurane Picoche	France	4:18.09		5
9	Sofía Pitoúli	Greece	4:20.29	PB	4
10	Ingeborg Løvnes	Norway	4:25.87		3

=== 3000 metres ===
Rank	Name	Nationality	Time	Notes	Points
1	Elena Korobkina	Russia	9:01.45		12
2	Laura Weightman	Great Britain	9:03.11		11
3	Iris María Fuentes-Pila	Spain	9:03.20	PB	10
4	Corinna Harrer	Germany	9:03.55		9
5	Renata Pliś	Poland	9:04.46	PB	8
6	Silvia Weissteiner	Italy	9:05.58		7
7	Christine Bardelle	France	9:09.36		6
8	Türkan Özata-Erişmiş	Turkey	9:11.28	PB	5
9	Yana Yanosh	Ukraine	9:25.44		4
10	Anastasía Karakatsáni	Greece	9:34.03		3
11	Nastassia Staravoitava	Belarus	9:37.34		2
12	Veronika Brennhovd Blom	Norway	9:40.97	PB	1

=== 5000 metres ===
Rank	Name	Nationality	Time	Notes	Points
1	Olga Golovkina	Russia	15:32.45	SB	12
2	Emelia Gorecka	Great Britain	15:40.52		11
3	Sabrina Mockenhaupt	Germany	15:40.94		10
4	Judith Plá	Spain	15:41.70	SB	9
5	Elena Romagnolo	Italy	15:43.11		8
6	Sophie Duarte	France	15:46.01		7
7	Dominika Nowakowska	Poland	15:47.81		6
8	Karoline Bjerkeli Grøvdal	Norway	15:48.21		5
9	Esma Aydemir	Turkey	15:50.05	PB	4
10	Viktoriya Pohoryelska	Ukraine	15:53.21		3
11	Ouranía Reboúli	Greece	16:26.66		2
12	Iryna Ananenka	Belarus	16:28.73		1

=== 3000 metres steeplechase ===
Rank	Name	Nationality	Time	Notes	Points
1	Natalia Aristarkhova	Russia	9:30.65	EL	12
2	Valentyna Zhudina	Ukraine	9:34.60		11
3	Antje Möldner-Schmidt	Germany	9:35.67	SB	10
4	Diana Martín	Spain	9:44.90	SB	9
5	Lennie Waite	Great Britain	9:56.19		8
6	Binnaz Uslu	Turkey	9:59.34		7
7	Sviatlana Kudzelich	Belarus	9:59.60		6
8	Claire Perraux	France	10:03.29		5
9	Athiná Koíni	Greece	10:03.75		4
10	Tauria Samiri	Italy	10:09.19		3
11	Katarzyna Kowalska	Poland	10:11.26		2
12	Kristine Helle	Norway	10:54.36		1

=== 100 metres hurdles ===
Wind:
Heat 1: +1.9 m/s
Heat 2: +2.6 m/s

Rank	Heat	Lane	Name	Nationality	React	Time	Notes	Points
1	2	4	Tiffany Porter	Great Britain	0.148	12.62		12
2	2	7	Tatiana Dektyareva	Russia	0.160	12.88		11
3	2	3	Hanna Platitsyna	Ukraine	0.154	12.91		10
~~4~~	2	6	Alice Decaux	France	0.157	~~12.94~~	DQ (doping)	0
4	2	5	Veronica Borsi	Italy	0.198	13.01		9
5	2	2	Alina Talay	Belarus	0.161	13.02		8
6	1	4	Nadine Hildebrand	Germany	0.147	13.11	SB	7
7	1	5	Isabelle Pedersen	Norway	0.174	13.23		6
8	1	6	Caridad Jerez	Spain	0.129	13.24		5
9	1	3	Olibía Petsoúdi	Greece	0.181	13.39	=PB	4
10	1	2	Karolina Kołeczek	Poland	0.157	14.04		3
11	1	7	Sema Apak	Turkey	0.180	14.31		2

=== 400 metres hurdles ===
Rank	Heat	Lane	Name	Nationality	React	Time	Notes	Points
1	2	4	Eilidh Child	Great Britain	0.180	54.42	PB	12
2	2	5	Hanna Yaroshchuk	Ukraine	0.154	55.27		11
3	2	6	Vera Rudakova	Russia	0.277	56.20		10
4	2	3	Jennifer Rockwell	Italy	0.210	56.32	SB	9
~~5~~	2	2	Elif Yıldırım	Turkey	0.163	~~57.07~~	DQ (doping)	0
5	1	6	Phara Anarchasis	France	0.227	57.43	SB	8
6	1	4	Joanna Linkiewicz	Poland	0.218	57.73		7
7	2	7	Christiane Klopsch	Germany	0.160	58.00		6
8	1	5	Laura Sotomayor	Spain	0.172	58.06		5
9	1	2	Stine Tomb	Norway	0.164	58.55		4
10	1	3	Hristína Hantzí-Neag	Greece	0.200	59.76		3
11	1	7	Maryna Boika	Belarus	0.160	1:00.02		2

=== 4 × 100 metres relay ===
Rank	Heat	Lane	Name	Nationality	Time	Note	Points
1	2	2	Olesya Povh, Viktoriya Pyatachenko, Mariya Ryemyen, Nataliya Pohrebnyak	Ukraine	42.62	EL	12
2	2	6	Yasmin Kwadwo, Inna Weit, Tatjana Pinto, Verena Sailer	Germany	43.15		11
3	2	5	Yulia Katsura, Yulia Kashina, Elizaveta Savlinis, Ekaterina Kuzina	Russia	43.23		10
4	2	7	Carima Louami, Myriam Soumaré, Jennifer Galais, Céline Distel-Bonnet	France	43.52		9
5	2	4	Tiffany Porter, Anyika Onuora, Annabelle Lewis, Asha Philip	Great Britain	43.52		8
6	2	3	Marika Popowicz, Weronika Wedler, Ewelina Ptak, Martyna Opoń	Poland	43.85		7
7	1	6	Micol Cattaneo, Irene Siragusa, Ilenia Draisci, Audrey Alloh	Italy	44.35		6
8	1	2	Volha Astashka, Alina Talay, Katsiaryna Shumak, Katsiaryna Hanchar	Belarus	44.38		5
9	1	5	Maria Isabel Perez, Plácida Martinez, Estela Garcia, Maria de Frutos	Spain	45.06		4
10	1	4	Hatice Öztürk, Saliha Özyurt, Aksel Demirtaş-Gürcan, Nimet Karakuş	Turkey	45.07		3
11	1	3	Maria Gatou, Elisavet Pesiridou, Grigoría-Emmanouéla Keramidá, Yeoryía Koklóni	Greece	45.17		2
12	1	7	Mari Gilde Brubak, Folake Akinyemi, Christine Bjelland Jensen, Tara Marie Norum	Norway	45.20		1

=== 4 × 400 metres relay ===
Rank	Heat	Lane	Name	Nationality	Time	Note	Points
1	2	4	Eilidh Child, Shana Cox, Meghan Beesley, Christine Ohuruogu	Great Britain	3:28.60		12
2	2	5	Ksenia Gusarova, Yuliya Terekhova, Tatyana Firova, Ksenia Zadorina	Russia	3:29.46		11
3	2	2	Marie Gayot, Lénora Guion-Firmin, Phara Anacharsis, Floria Gueï	France	3:29.55		10
4	2	7	Darya Prystupa, Alina Lohvynenko, Nataliya Pyhyda, Olha Zemlyak	Ukraine	3:30.36		9
5	2	3	Agata Bednarek, Patrycja Wyciszkiewicz, Małgorzata Hołub, Justyna Święty	Poland	3:31.35		8
6	2	6	Esther Cremer, Lena Schmidt, Christiane Klopsch, Ruth-Sophia Spelmeyer	Germany	3:31.83		7
7	1	7	Hanna Reishal, Iryna Khliustava, Yuliya Yurenia, Ilona Usovich	Belarus	3:34.14		6
8	1	6	Chiara Bazzoni, Maria Enrica Spacca, Elena Maria Bonfanti, Maria Benedict Chigboglu	Italy	3:35.26		5
~~9~~	1	4	Özge Akın, Birsen Engin, Derya Yıldırım, Elif Yıldırım	Turkey	~~3:36.89~~	DQ (doping)	0
9	1	5	Laura Sotomayor, Aauri Bokesa, Plácida Martínez, Paula Ferreiros	Spain	3:39.45		4
	1	3	Agní Dervéni, Evangelia Zigori, Maria Petridou, Aryiró Pintí	Greece	DQ		0
	1	2	Tara Marie Norum, Trine Mjåland, Line Kloster, Vilde Svortevik	Norway	DQ		0

=== High jump ===
Rank	Name	Nationality	1.70	1.75	1.80	1.85	1.89	1.92	1.95	1.98	2.00	Mark	Note	Points
1	Maria Kuchina	Russia	—	o	o	o	o	o	xxo	o	xx	1.98	PB	12
2	Alessia Trost	Italy	—	o	o	o	o	o	xxx			1.92		10.5
2	Kamila Stepaniuk	Poland	—	o	o	o	o	o	xxx			1.92		10.5
4	Ruth Beitia	Spain	—	—	o	o	o	x-	xx			1.89		9
5	Burcu Ayhan-Yüksel	Turkey	o	o	o	o	xxx					1.85		7.5
5	Marie-Laurence Jungfleisch	Germany	—	o	o	o	xxx					1.85		7.5
7	Adonía Steryíou	Greece	—	o	xo	o	xxx					1.85		6
8	Tonje Angelsen	Norway	—	—	xxo	o	xx					1.85		5
9	Isobel Pooley	Great Britain	o	o	o	xo	xxx					1.85		4
10	Maryia Nestsiarchuk	Belarus	o	xo	o	xo	xx					1.85		3
11	Mélanie Melfort	France	—	o	xo	xxo	x					1.85		2
12	Iryna Kovalenko	Ukraine	—	o	o	xxx						1.80		1

=== Pole vault ===
Rank	Name	Nationality	3.80	4.00	4.15	4.25	4.35	4.40	4.45	4.50	4.55	4.60	4.72	Mark	Note	Points
1	Silke Spiegelburg	Germany	—	—	—	—	—	o	—	xo	—	xxo	xxx	4.60		12
2	Anzhelika Sidorova	Russia	—	—	—	o	xo	o	xo	xo	o	x		4.55	PB	11
3	Anna Rogowska	Poland	—	—	—	—	—	xxo	—	—	—	xx		4.40		10
4	Naroa Agirre	Spain	o	o	o	xxo	o	xx						4.35	SB	8.5
4	Marion Lotout	France	—	—	xxo	—	o	—	xx					4.35		8.5
6	Sonia Malavisi	Italy	o	xo	o	o	xxx							4.25		7
7	Kateryna Kozlova	Ukraine	o	o	xxo	xx								4.15		6
8	Elmas Seda Fırtına	Turkey	xxo	o	xx									4.00		5
9	Katrine Haarklau	Norway	xxo	xx										3.80		4
	Holly Bleasdale	Great Britain	—	—	—	xxx								NM		0
	Iryna Yakaltsevich	Belarus	xxx											NM		0
	Nikolía Kiriakopoúlou	Greece												DNS		0

=== Long jump ===
Rank	Name	Nationality	#1	#2	#3	#4	Mark	Notes	Points
1	Éloyse Lesueur	France	6.19	x	6.44	x	6.44		12
2	Daria Klishina	Russia	6.43	x	x	6.43	6.43		11
3	Shara Proctor	Great Britain	x	x	6.43	6.29	6.43		10
4	Evaggelía Galéni	Greece	5.89	6.28	6.23	5.98	6.28		9
5	Sosthene Moguenara	Germany	x	5.98	6.28		6.28		8
6	Dariya Derkach	Italy	6.21	6.17	x		6.21		7
7	Teresa Dobija	Poland	6.15	6.20	x		6.20		6
8	María Del Mar Jover	Spain	x	5.76	6.14		6.14		5
9	Isabelle Pedersen	Norway	5.90	6.08	6.08		6.08	PB	4
10	Maryna Bekh	Ukraine	x	x	6.04		6.04		3
11	Sevim Sinmez Serbest	Turkey	5.86	x	5.94		5.94		2
12	Natallia Viatkina	Belarus	x	5.87	5.46		5.87		1

=== Triple jump ===
Rank	Name	Nationality	#1	#2	#3	#4	Mark	Notes	Points
1	Olha Saladuha	Ukraine	14.49	14.45	14.04	14.42	14.49		12
2	Ekaterina Koneva	Russia	14.10	x	13.66	13.45	14.10		11
3	Simona La Mantia	Italy	13.99	x	13.87	x	13.99		10
4	Yamilé Aldama	Great Britain	13.90	x	13.83	12.99	13.90		9
5	Jenny Elbe	Germany	13.85	13.84	13.63		13.85		8
6	Paraskeví Papahrístou	Greece	x	13.69	13.52		13.69		7
7	Anna Jagaciak	Poland	x	x	13.68		13.68		6
8	Natallia Viatkina	Belarus	13.60	13.43	13.45		13.60		5
9	Teresa Nzola Meso Ba	France	13.27	13.26	13.51		13.51		4
10	Patricia Sarrapio	Spain	13.22	13.26	13.35		13.35		3
11	Sevim Sinmez Serbest	Turkey	x	12.78	x		12.78		2
12	Chiamaka Okparaebo	Norway	x	11.99	x		11.99		1

=== Shot put ===
Rank	Name	Nationality	#1	#2	#3	#4	Mark	Notes	Points
1	Christina Schwanitz	Germany	x	19.30	19.20	19.05	19.30		12
2	Halyna Obleshchuk	Ukraine	16.46	18.05	x	17.04	18.05		11
3	Emel Dereli	Turkey	14.40	17.50	17.07	x	17.50		10
4	Chiara Rosa	Italy	16.49	16.90	x	17.18	16.90		9
5	Úrsula Ruiz	Spain	16.78	16.50	x		16.78		8
6	Yulia Leantsiuk	Belarus	16.74	16.59	16.72		16.74		7
7	Sophie McKinna	Great Britain	16.28	15.84	16.37		16.37		6
8	Jessica Cérival	France	15.93	x	16.25		16.25		5
9	Natalia Troneva	Russia	16.25	x	15.71		16.25		4
10	Agnieszka Dudzińska	Poland	x	16.19	x		16.19		3
11	Evaggelía Sofáni	Greece	14.82	14.72	14.65		14.82		2
12	Kristin Sundsteigen	Norway	14.63	x	14.20		14.63	SB	1

=== Discus throw ===
Rank	Name	Nationality	#1	#2	#3	#4	Mark	Notes	Points
1	Mélina Robert-Michon	France	62.37	x	63.75	62.84	63.75	SB	12
2	Julia Fischer	Germany	61.25	x	62.67	x	62.67		11
3	Żaneta Glanc	Poland	x	60.32	60.15	61.70	61.70		10
4	Nataliya Semenova	Ukraine	59.99	59.89	x	x	59.99		9
~~5~~	Vera Ganeeva	Russia	~~59.60~~	~~x~~	~~59.41~~		~~59.60~~	DQ (doping)	0
5	Jade Lally	Great Britain	58.73	57.60	57.28		58.73		8
6	Anastasiya Kashtanava	Belarus	49.39	56.40	54.38		56.40		7
7	Sabina Asenjo	Spain	54.44	53.48	52.40		54.44		6
8	Valentina Aniballi	Italy	47.96	54.09	x		54.09		5
9	Hrisoúla Anagnostopoúlou	Greece	50.66	53.00	52.65		53.00		4
10	Grete Etholm	Norway	48.44	50.29	49.80		50.29		3
11	Emel Dereli	Turkey	x	37.72	x		37.72		2

=== Hammer throw ===
Rank	Name	Nationality	#1	#2	#3	#4	Mark	Notes	Points
1	Betty Heidler	Germany	74.31	71.59	x	x	74.31		12
2	Anita Włodarczyk	Poland	73.51	x	74.14	73.36	74.14		11
3	Sophie Hitchon	Great Britain	x	70.68	72.97	71.67	72.97	NR	10
~~4~~	Aksana Miankova	Belarus	~~71.92~~	~~72.11~~	~~69.79~~	~~70.53~~	~~72.11~~		0
5	Iryna Novozhylova	Ukraine	65.25	67.10	65.30		67.10		9
6	Berta Castells	Spain	66.21	x	65.04		66.21		8
7	Silvia Salis	Italy	58.08	60.45	64.76		64.76		7
~~8~~	Gulfiya Khanafeeva	Russia	~~62.90~~	~~x~~	~~63.67~~		~~63.67~~		0
9	Iliána Korosídou	Greece	x	61.41	x		61.41		6
10	Trude Raad	Norway	61.21	57.48	58.79		61.21		5
11	Berivan Şakır	Turkey	20.85	—	—		20.85		4
	Stéphanie Falzon	France	x	x	x		NM		0

=== Javelin throw ===
Rank	Name	Nationality	#1	#2	#3	#4	Mark	Notes	Points
1	Christina Obergföll	Germany	55.82	58.30	62.64	x	62.64		12
2	Mercedes Chilla	Spain	58.55	x	x	54.51	58.55		11
3	Vira Rebryk	Ukraine	52.85	54.77	57.92	x	57.92		10
4	Maria Abakumova	Russia	55.79	57.09	56.46	x	57.09		9
5	Barbara Madejczyk	Poland	50.52	55.23	54.26		55.23		8
6	Tatsiana Khaladovich	Belarus	49.09	53.77	50.65		53.77		7
7	Sávva Líka	Greece	53.53	x	x		53.53		6
8	Séphora Bissoly	France	51.73	50.53	48.54		51.73		5
9	Izzy Jeffs	Great Britain	46.14	43.81	50.27		50.27		4
10	Tove Beate Dahle	Norway	49.52	49.69	50.07		50.07		3
11	Berivan Şakır	Turkey	45.18	48.81	48.72		48.81		2
12	Sara Jemai	Italy	48.58	48.14	48.39		48.58		1

=== Score table ===
Event		BLR	FRA	GER	GBR	GRE	ITA	NOR	POL	RUS	ESP	TUR	UKR
100 metres	M	1	12	8	7	3	6	11	10	9	4	5	2
100 metres	W	5	11	10	8	1	2	6	7	9	3	4	12
200 metres	M	4	12	5	9	6	8	11	0	3	7	2	10
200 metres	W	3	11	6	10	0	9	2	7	5	8	4	12
400 metres	M	0	3	10	11	6	8	2	9	12	4.5	7	4.5
400 metres	W	4	10	5	12	1	9	3	6	11	8	2	7
800 metres	M	0	9	7	10	3	8	4	12	2	6	11	5
800 metres	W	10	8	6	12	3	7	5	9	0	2	4	11
1500 metres	M	1	4	9	11	5	3	2	10	7	8	12	6
1500 metres	W	0	5	7	9	4	10	3	11	0	12	6	8
3000 metres	M	3	12	8	6	1	4	2	7	10	5	11	9
3000 metres	W	2	6	9	11	3	7	1	8	12	10	5	4
5000 metres	M	3	11	7	12	1	6	2	8	4	5	10	9
5000 metres	W	1	7	10	11	2	8	5	6	12	9	4	3
3000 metre steeplechase	M	5	10	9	3	2	7	4	6	0	11	12	8
3000 metre steeplechase	W	6	5	10	8	4	3	1	2	12	9	7	11
110/100 metre hurdles	M	5	11	6	8	9	7	3	10	12	4	1	2
110/100 metre hurdles	W	8	0	7	12	4	9	6	3	11	5	2	10
400 metre hurdles	M	2	10	12	11	4	8	9	7	5	6	1	3
400 metre hurdles	W	2	8	6	12	3	9	4	7	10	5	0	11
4 × 100 metres relay	M	0	9	11	12	3	8	0	10	6	5	4	7
4 × 100 metres relay	W	5	9	11	8	2	6	1	7	10	4	3	12
4 × 400 metres relay	M	1	8	9	12	4	7	2	10	11	6	3	5
4 × 400 metres relay	W	6	10	7	12	0	5	0	8	11	4	0	9
High jump	M	3.5	11	8	10	5	9	2	6	7	3.5	1	12
High jump	W	3	2	7.5	4	6	10.5	5	10.5	12	9	7.5	1
Pole vault	M	0	12	10	4	7	11	3	9	5.5	5.5	0	8
Pole vault	W	0	8.5	12	0	0	7	4	10	11	8.5	5	6
Long jump	M	1	6	9	10	11	3	4	5	12	8	2	7
Long jump	W	1	12	8	10	9	7	4	6	11	5	2	3
Triple jump	M	4	11	2	10	9	7	1	6	12	5	3	8
Triple jump	W	5	4	8	9	7	10	1	6	11	3	2	12
Shot put	M	7	5	12	4	6	2	1	11	10	9	8	3
Shot put	W	7	5	12	6	2	9	1	3	4	8	10	11
Discus throw	M	5	1	12	8	3	6	7	9	2	11	10	4
Discus throw	W	7	12	11	8	4	5	3	10	0	6	2	9
Hammer throw	M	9	10	11	4	3	8	7	12	0	6	0	5
Hammer throw	W	0	0	12	10	6	7	5	11	0	8	4	9
Javelin throw	M	7	1	11	5	6	2	9	8	12	4	3	10
Javelin throw	W	7	5	12	4	6	1	3	8	9	11	2	10
Country		BLR	FRA	GER	GBR	GRE	ITA	NOR	POL	RUS	ESP	TUR	UKR
Total		143.5	306.5	352.5	343	164	268.5	149	310.5	302.5	261	181.5	298.5
