= Athletics at the 2015 Summer Universiade – Men's discus throw =

The men's discus throw event at the 2015 Summer Universiade was held on 11 July at the Gwangju Universiade Main Stadium.

== Results ==
Rank	Athlete	Nationality	#1	#2	#3	#4	#5	#6	Result	Notes
1st place, gold medalist(s)	Philip Milanov	Belgium	62.60	64.15	x	x	x	x	64.15	
2nd place, silver medalist(s)	Matthew Denny	Australia	62.11	x	x	62.58	x	58.43	62.58	PB
3rd place, bronze medalist(s)	Andrius Gudžius	Lithuania	60.75	62.54	x	61.31	61.32	x	62.54	
4	Chad Wright	Jamaica	59.88	58.16	x	x	60.10	58.63	60.10	
5	Federico Apolloni	Italy	58.80	57.74	x	59.70	58.45	58.95	59.70	
6	János Huszák	Hungary	58.61	x	x	52.08	56.40	x	58.61	
7	Russell Tucker	South Africa	x	57.31	x	x	–	–	57.31	
8	Mikhail Dvornikov	Russia	54.04	56.20	x	55.60	55.98	56.19	56.20	
9	Marshal Hall	New Zealand	53.49	54.59	x				54.59	
10	Magomedsalam Magomedov	Russia	52.35	54.21	x				54.21	
11	Tadej Hribar	Slovenia	53.83	x	x				53.83	
12	Muhammad Irfan Shamshuddin	Malaysia	x	52.93	53.79				53.79	
13	Francisco Belo	Portugal	49.60	52.40	x				52.40	
	Mahmoud Samimi	Iran	x	x	x				NM	
