= 2017 World Championships in Athletics – Men's discus throw =

Men's discus throw at the 2017 World Championships
- Venue: Olympic Stadium
- Dates: 4 August (qualification); 5 August (final)
- Competitors: 32 from 23 nations
- Winning distance: 69.21

Medalists
gold medal	Andrius Gudžius	Lithuania
silver medal	Daniel Ståhl	Sweden
bronze medal	Mason Finley	United States

The men's discus throw at the 2017 World Championships in Athletics will be held at the Olympic Stadium on 4–5 August.

The winning margin was 2 cm which as of 2024 is the only time the men's discus has been won by less than 25 cm at these championships.

== Summary ==
The first throw of the final was a personal best by American Mason Finley, 67.07 metres. It only held the lead for two throwers until Andrius Gudžius threw 67.52 metres. Those held up through the round. At the start of the second round, Finley added almost another metre to his personal best, throwing 68.03 metres. The next thrower, world leader Daniel Ståhl went better throwing 69.19 metres. The next thrower was Gudžius, who edged two centimetres further with a 69.21 metres. Those three throws at the start of the second round were the medals. No other athlete came within two metres of Finley for bronze.

== Records ==
Before the competition records were as follows:

Record	Perf.	Athlete	Nat.	Date	Location
World	74.08	Jürgen Schult	GDR	6 Jun 1986	Neubrandenburg, East Germany
Championship	70.17	Virgilijus Alekna	LTU	7 Aug 2005	Helsinki, Finland
World leading	71.29	Daniel Ståhl	SWE	29 Jun 2017	Sollentuna, Sweden
African	70.32	Frantz Kruger	RSA	26 May 2002	Salon-de-Provence, France
Asian	69.32	Ehsan Haddadi	IRI	3 Jun 2008	Tallinn, Estonia
NACAC	72.34	Ben Plucknett	USA	7 Jul 1981	Stockholm, Sweden
South American	66.32	Jorge Balliengo	ARG	15 Apr 2006	Rosario, Argentina
European	74.08	Jürgen Schult	GDR	6 Jun 1986	Neubrandenburg, East Germany
Oceanian	68.20	Benn Harradine	AUS	10 May 2013	Townsville, Australia

No records were set at the competition.

== Qualification standard ==
The standard to qualify automatically for entry was 65.00 metres.

== Schedule ==
The event schedule, in local time (UTC+1), was as follows:

Date	Time	Round
4 August	20:45	Qualification
5 August	19:26	Final

== Results ==
=== Qualification ===
The qualification round took place on 4 August, in 2 groups, with Group A starting at 19:20 and Group B starting at 20:49. attaining a mark of at least 64.50 metres ( Q ) or at least the 12 best performers ( q ) qualified for the final. The overall results were as follows:

Rank	Group	Name	Nationality	Round			Mark	Notes
Rank	Group	Name	Nationality	1	2	3	Mark	Notes
1	A	Daniel Ståhl	Sweden	61.83	67.64		67.64	Q
2	B	Andrius Gudžius	Lithuania	67.01			67.01	Q
3	A	Robert Harting	Germany	65.32			65.32	Q
4	A	Piotr Małachowski	Poland	65.13			65.13	Q
5	B	Fedrick Dacres	Jamaica	64.46	64.28	64.82	64.82	Q
6	A	Mason Finley	United States	63.98	64.76		64.76	Q
7	B	Simon Pettersson	Sweden	60.43	x	63.69	63.69	q
8	B	Robert Urbanek	Poland	62.37	63.67	63.04	63.67	q
9	B	Gerd Kanter	Estonia	x	63.61	x	63.61	q
10	A	Lukas Weißhaidinger	Austria	63.57	x	61.48	63.57	q
11	A	Apostolos Parellis	Cyprus	63.36	62.68	62.67	63.36	q
12	A	Traves Smikle	Jamaica	63.23	x	x	63.23	q
13	B	Lolassonn Djouhan	France	58.00	63.21	61.35	63.21	
14	A	Philip Milanov	Belgium	62.94	x	63.16	63.16	
15	A	Ehsan Hadadi	Iran	63.03	61.22	60.92	63.03	
16	B	Mauricio Ortega	Colombia	x	62.34	62.97	62.97	
17	A	Martin Kupper	Estonia	59.49	62.11	62.71	62.71	
18	B	Victor Hogan	South Africa	61.76	62.26	x	62.26	
19	B	Alex Rose	Samoa	61.62	x	59.63	61.62	
20	B	Andrew Evans	United States	61.32	60.47	60.78	61.32	
21	B	Benn Harradine	Australia	60.00	x	60.95	60.95	
22	B	Zoltán Kővágó	Hungary	56.71	56.26	59.46	59.46	
23	B	Viktor Butenko	Authorised Neutral Athletes	59.29	x	x	59.29	
24	A	Niklas Arrhenius	Sweden	58.91	x	58.84	58.91	
25	A	Erik Cadée	Netherlands	58.19	x	58.90	58.90	
26	A	Sven Martin Skagestad	Norway	x	57.89	58.86	58.86	
27	B	Mustafa Al-Saamah	Iraq	57.77	56.38	58.40	58.40	
28	A	Mitchell Cooper	Australia	x	56.20	57.26	57.26	
29	B	Nicholas Percy	Great Britain & N.I.	x	52.56	56.93	56.93	
30	A	Marshall Hall	New Zealand	x	56.64	54.20	56.64	
	A	Rodney Brown	United States	x	x	x	NM	
	B	Martin Wierig	Germany	x	x	x	NM	

=== Final ===
The final took place on 5 August at 19:27. The results were as follows:

Rank	Name	Nationality	#1	#2	#3	#4	#5	#6	Mark	Notes
1st place, gold medalist(s)	Andrius Gudžius	Lithuania	67.52	69.21	63.43	x	63.98	67.89	69.21	PB
2nd place, silver medalist(s)	Daniel Ståhl	Sweden	x	69.19	66.58	68.57	x	63.06	69.19	
3rd place, bronze medalist(s)	Mason Finley	United States	67.07	68.03	65.21	37.36	66.59	x	68.03	PB
4	Fedrick Dacres	Jamaica	65.62	65.70	x	65.83	64.41	64.67	65.83	
5	Piotr Małachowski	Poland	63.96	65.14	64.88	x	65.24	63.92	65.24	
6	Robert Harting	Germany	65.10	x	64.75	x	x	x	65.10	
7	Robert Urbanek	Poland	61.93	64.15	63.91	64.14	x	63.46	64.15	
8	Traves Smikle	Jamaica	63.64	64.04	x	62.28	x	63.37	64.04	
9	Lukas Weißhaidinger	Austria	63.76	62.75	x				63.76	
10	Apostolos Parellis	Cyprus	62.18	63.17	x				63.17	
11	Simon Pettersson	Sweden	55.58	60.39	x				60.39	
12	Gerd Kanter	Estonia	59.72	60.00	x				60.00	
