= Andrei Gag =

Romanian athlete

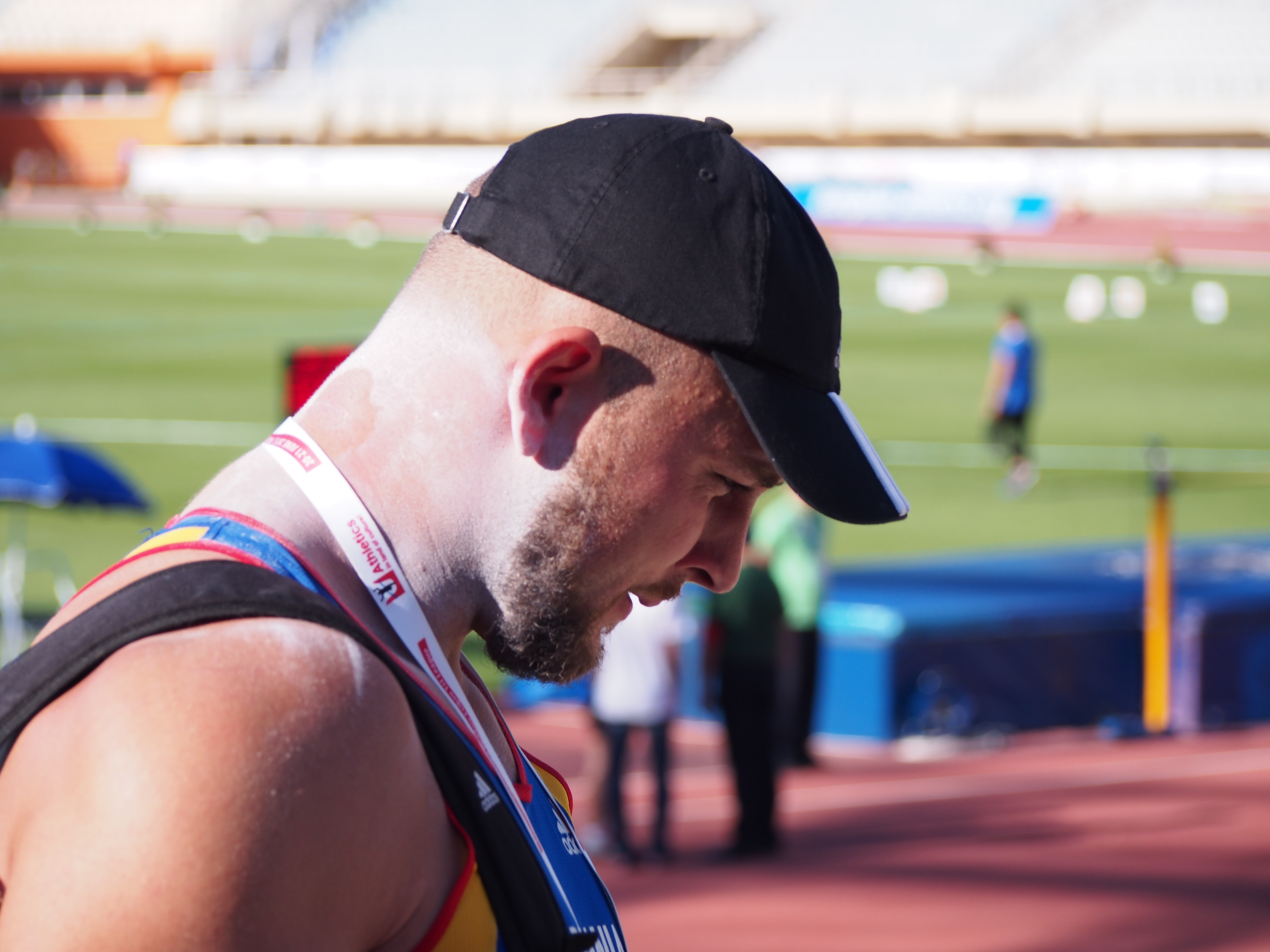
- Andrei Gag in 2015

Personal information
- Nationality: Romanian
- Born: 27 April 1991 (age 35)
- Education: Ștefan cel Mare University of Suceava
- Height: 1.91 m (6 ft 3 in)
- Weight: 89 kg (196 lb)

Sport
- Sport: Track and field
- Events: Shot put, discus throw
- Club: CSM Arad
Medal record
World Indoor Championships
| Silver medal – second place | 2016 Portland | Shot put |
World Junior Championships
| Silver medal – second place | 2010 Moncton | Discus throw |
Universiade
| Silver medal – second place | 2015 Gwangju | Shot put |
| Bronze medal – third place | 2017 Taipei | Shot put |

Andrei Marius Gag (born 27 April 1991) is a Romanian athlete competing in the shot put and discus throw. He won the silver medal at the 2015 Summer Universiade.

His personal bests in the shot put are 21.06 metres outdoors (Cluj-Napoca 2015 – NR) and 20.89 metres indoors (Portland 2014). In addition, he has a personal best of 61.27 metres in the discus throw (Bucharest 2014).

== Competition record ==
| Year | Competition | Venue | Position | Event | Notes |
Representing Romania
| 2008 | World Junior Championships | Bydgoszcz, Poland | 30th (q) | Discus throw (1.75 kg) | 46.98 m |
| 2009 | European Junior Championships | Novi Sad, Serbia | 10th | Discus throw (1.75 kg) | 55.84 m |
| 2010 | World Junior Championships | Moncton, Canada | 2nd | Discus throw (1.75 kg) | 61.85 m |
| 2011 | European U23 Championships | Ostrava, Czech Republic | 19th (q) | Discus throw | 54.83 m |
| 2013 | European U23 Championships | Tampere, Finland | 14th (q) | Discus throw | 55.98 m |
| 2013 | Jeux de la Francophonie | Nice, France | 5th | Discus throw | 55.60 m |
| 2014 | European Championships | Zürich, Switzerland | 20th (q) | Shot put | 19.18 m |
| 2015 | European Indoor Championships | Prague, Czech Republic | 26th (q) | Shot put | 18.45 m |
| 2015 | Universiade | Gwangju, South Korea | 2nd | Shot put | 19.92 m |
| 2015 | World Championships | Beijing, China | 17th (q) | Shot put | 19.74 m |
| 2016 | World Indoor Championships | Portland, United States | 2nd | Shot put | 20.89 m |
| 2016 | European Championships | Amsterdam, Netherlands | 16th (q) | Shot put | 19.49 m |
| 2016 | Olympic Games | Rio de Janeiro, Brazil | 13th (q) | Shot put | 20.40 m |
| 2017 | European Indoor Championships | Belgrade, Serbia | 14th (q) | Shot put | 19.24 m |
| 2017 | World Championships | London, United Kingdom | 12th | Shot put | 19.96 m |
| 2017 | Universiade | Taipei, Taiwan | 3rd | Shot put | 20.12 m |
| 2018 | European Championships | Berlin, Germany | 23rd (q) | Shot put | 19.26 m |
| 2019 | European Indoor Championships | Glasgow, United Kingdom | 15th (q) | Shot put | 19.70 m |
| 2019 | World Championships | Doha, Qatar | 17th (q) | Shot put | 20.50 m |
