= 2018 European Athletics Championships – Men's discus throw =

Men's discus throw at the 2018 European Athletics Championships
- Venue: Olympic Stadium
- Location: Berlin
- Dates: August 7 (qualification); August 8 (final)
- Competitors: 26 from 17 nations
- Winning distance: 68.46

Medalists
gold medal	Andrius Gudžius	Lithuania
silver medal	Daniel Ståhl	Sweden
bronze medal	Lukas Weisshaidinger	Austria

The men's discus throw at the 2018 European Athletics Championships took place at the Olympic Stadium on 7 and 8 August.

== Records ==
Standing records prior to the 2018 European Athletics Championships
World record	Jürgen Schult (GDR)	74.08 m	Neubrandenburg, East Germany	6 June 1986
European record	Jürgen Schult (GDR)	74.08 m	Neubrandenburg, East Germany	6 June 1986
Championship record	Piotr Małachowski (POL)	68.87 m	Barcelona, Spain	1 August 2010
World Leading	Fedrick Dacres (JAM)	69.67 m	Stockholm, Sweden	10 June 2018
European Leading	Andrius Gudžius (LTU)	69.59 m	Stockholm, Sweden	10 June 2018

== Schedule ==
Date	Time	Round
7 August 2018	9:40	Qualification
8 August 2018	20:20	Final

All times are local times (UTC+2)

== Results ==
=== Qualification ===
Qualification: 64.00 m (Q) or best 12 performers (q)

Rank	Group	Name	Nationality	#1	#2	#3	Result	Note
1	A	Daniel Ståhl	Sweden	67.07			67.07	Q
2	B	Simon Pettersson	Sweden	x	64.82		64.82	Q
3	A	Alin Alexandru Firfirică	Romania	59.99	62.34	64.79	64.79	Q
4	B	Andrius Gudžius	Lithuania	60.49	x	64.30	64.30	Q
5	B	Gerd Kanter	Estonia	64.18			64.18	Q
6	A	Mykyta Nesterenko	Ukraine	60.62	59.55	63.34	63.34	q, SB
7	A	Robert Harting	Germany	62.69	63.29	x	63.29	q
8	B	Viktor Butenko	Authorised Neutral Athletes	60.86	x	62.63	62.63	q
9	B	Lolassonn Djouhan	France	59.26	62.54	x	62.54	q
10	A	Apostolos Parellis	Cyprus	60.50	60.18	62.32	62.32	q
11	A	Lukas Weisshaidinger	Austria	x	59.48	62.26	62.26	q
12	B	Ola Stunes Isene	Norway	58.45	62.19	58.41	62.19	q
13	A	Martin Kupper	Estonia	62.03	62.13	x	62.13	
14	B	Robert Urbanek	Poland	60.93	61.25	62.00	62.00	
15	A	Róbert Szikszai	Hungary	61.66	61.82	x	61.82	
16	B	Guðni Valur Guðnason	Iceland	x	61.36	57.39	61.36	
17	A	Axel Härstedt	Sweden	61.19	x	59.38	61.19	
18	A	Hannes Kirchler	Italy	57.94	59.44	60.42	60.42	
19	A	Daniel Jasinski	Germany	x	60.10	59.15	60.10	
20	B	Zoltán Kővágó	Hungary	58.91	59.29	x	59.29	
21	A	Giovanni Faloci	Italy	57.75	57.20	59.27	59.27	
22	B	Erik Cadée	Netherlands	57.97	x	x	57.97	
23	B	Nazzareno Di Marco	Italy	57.49	56.87	55.86	57.49	
24	B	Lois Maikel Martínez	Spain	x	x	54.56	54.56	
	B	Christoph Harting	Germany	x	x	x	NM	
	A	Piotr Małachowski	Poland	x	x	x	NM	

=== Final ===
Rank	Athlete	Nationality	#1	#2	#3	#4	#5	#6	Result	Notes
1st place, gold medalist(s)	Andrius Gudžius	Lithuania	65.75	62.89	67.19	67.66	x	68.46	68.46	
2nd place, silver medalist(s)	Daniel Ståhl	Sweden	x	x	64.20	68.23	x	x	68.23	
3rd place, bronze medalist(s)	Lukas Weisshaidinger	Austria	63.05	62.00	x	63.98	65.14	64.50	65.14	
4	Simon Pettersson	Sweden	x	63.00	x	x	x	64.55	64.55	
5	Gerd Kanter	Estonia	59.30	63.31	62.72	62.97	63.29	64.34	64.34	
6	Robert Harting	Germany	61.09	63.45	x	64.33	63.38	63.38	64.33	
7	Alin Alexandru Firfirică	Romania	58.43	63.30	61.02	60.45	63.23	63.73	63.73	
8	Apostolos Parellis	Cyprus	63.62	61.24	60.88	61.29	62.62	60.98	63.62	SB
9	Viktor Butenko	Authorised Neutral Athletes	60.11	61.42	62.24				62.24	
10	Lolassonn Djouhan	France	x	56.85	61.89				61.89	
11	Ola Stunes Isene	Norway	x	59.41	59.56				59.56	
12	Mykyta Nesterenko	Ukraine	x	55.01	57.66				57.66	
