= Viktor Butenko =

Russian discus thrower

Personal information
- Born: 10 March 1993 (age 33)

Sport
- Sport: Athletics
- Event: Discus throw
Medal record
Military World Games
| Bronze medal – third place | 2019 Wuhan | Discus throw |

Viktor Aleksandrovich Butenko (Russian: Виктор Александрович Бутенко; born 10 March 1993) is a Russian track and field athlete competing in the discus throw. He holds a personal best of 65.97 m (216 ft 5 in), set in 2013. He represented the host nation at the 2013 World Championships in Athletics in Moscow, finishing eighth. He was born in Stavropol.

He was a finalist at the 2014 European Athletics Championships, placing fifth. Among his other honours are a win at the European Cup Winter Throwing at a bronze at the European Team Championships in 2014.

He was the winner at the Russian Athletics Championships in 2016. However, he was suspended from international competition in 2016 due to an overarching ban on the All-Russia Athletic Federation as a response to doping.

== International competitions ==
| Year | Competition | Venue | Position | Event | Notes |
|---|---|---|---|---|---|
| 2011 | European Junior Championships | Tallinn, Estonia | 6th | Discus throw | 58.45 m |
| 2012 | World Junior Championships | Barcelona, Spain | 4th | Discus throw | 61.48 m |
| 2013 | European Cup Winter Throwing | Castellón de la Plana, Spain | 5th | Discus throw (U23) | 59.86 m |
| 2013 | European Team Championships | Gateshead, United Kingdom | 11th | Discus throw | 51.96 m |
| 2013 | European U23 Championships | Tampere, Finland | 2nd | Discus throw | 62.27 m |
| 2013 | World Championships | Moscow, Russia | 8th | Discus throw | 63.38 m |
| 2014 | European Cup Winter Throwing | Leiria, Portugal | 1st | Discus throw | 64.38 m |
| 2014 | European Team Championships | Braunschweig, Germany | 3rd | Discus throw | 62.81 m |
| 2014 | European Championships | Zürich, Switzerland | 5th | Discus throw | 62.80 m |
| 2014 | DecaNation | Angers, France | 1st | Discus throw | 62.54 m |
| 2015 | European Cup Winter Throwing | Leiria, Portugal | 3rd | Discus throw | 65.44 m |
| 2017 | World Championships | London, United Kingdom | 23rd (q) | Discus throw | 59.29 m |
| 2018 | European Championships | Berlin, Germany | 9th | Discus throw | 62.24 m |

== National titles ==
- Russian Athletics Championships
  - Discus throw: 2016
