= Juan José Caicedo =

Ecuadorian discus thrower

Personal information
- Full name: Juan José Caicedo Calderón
- Nationality: Ecuador
- Born: 27 July 1992 (age 34) San Lorenzo, Ecuador

Sport
- Sport: Athletics

Juan José Caicedo Calderón (born 27 July 1992) is an Ecuadorian discus thrower. He competed in the 2020 Summer Olympics.

== International competitions ==
Year	Competition	Venue	Position	Event	Notes
Representing Ecuador
2010	World Junior Championships	Moncton, Canada	31st (q)	Discus throw (1.75 kg)	48.69 m
2011	South American Junior Championships	Medellín, Colombia	7th	Shot put (6 kg)	15.36 m
2011	South American Junior Championships	Medellín, Colombia	5th	Discus throw (1.75 kg)	52.49 m
2012	South American U23 Championships	São Paulo, Brazil	5th	Shot put	12.96 m
2012	South American U23 Championships	São Paulo, Brazil	4th	Discus throw	50.81 m
2013	South American Championships	Cartagena, Colombia	8th	Shot put	15.88 m
2013	South American Championships	Cartagena, Colombia	8th	Discus throw	51.96 m
2013	Bolivarian Games	Trujillo, Peru	6th	Shot put	15.82 m
2013	Bolivarian Games	Trujillo, Peru	4th	Discus throw	53.73 m
2014	South American Games	Santiago, Chile	–	Shot put	NM
2014	South American Games	Santiago, Chile	6th	Discus throw	54.33 m
2014	Ibero-American Championships	São Paulo, Brazil	8th	Discus throw	54.55 m
2014	South American U23 Championships	Montevideo, Uruguay	3rd	Shot put	16.17 m
2014	South American U23 Championships	Montevideo, Uruguay	4th	Discus throw	53.97 m
2015	South American Championships	Lima, Peru	3rd	Discus throw	54.88 m
2017	South American Championships	Luque, Paraguay	–	Discus throw	NM
2017	Bolivarian Games	Santa Marta, Colombia	1st	Discus throw	57.99 m
2018	Ibero-American Championships	Trujillo, Peru	2nd	Discus throw	58.68 m
2018	South American Games	Cochabamba, Bolivia	2nd	Discus throw	57.37 m
2019	South American Championships	Lima, Peru	5th	Discus throw	52.89 m
2019	Pan American Games	Lima, Peru	6th	Discus throw	57.81 m
2021	Olympic Games	Tokyo, Japan	28th (q)	Discus throw	57.75 m
2022	Ibero-American Championships	La Nucía, Spain	5th	Discus throw	55.79 m
2022	South American Games	Asunción, Paraguay	3rd	Discus throw	62.10 m
2023	South American Championships	São Paulo, Brazil	2nd	Discus throw	62.46 m
2023	World Championships	Budapest, Hungary	35th (h)	Discus throw	55.78 m
2024	Ibero-American Championships	Cuiabá, Brazil	6th	Discus throw	59.98 m
2024	Olympic Games	Paris, France	25th (q)	Discus throw	60.99 m
2025	South American Championships	Mar del Plata, Argentina	5th	Discus throw	60.11 m
2025	Bolivarian Games	Lima, Peru	1st	Discus throw	61.43 m
2026	Ibero-American Championships	Lima, Peru	3rd	Discus throw	63.43 m
2026	Pan American Championships	Medellín, Colombia	3rd	Discus throw	62.33 m
2026	South American Games	Santa Fe, Argentina	3rd	Discus throw	60.92 m
