= Giovanni Faloci =

Italian discus thrower (born 1985)

Personal information
- National team: Italy
- Born: 13 October 1985 (age 40) Umbertide, Italy
- Height: 1.91 m (6 ft 3 in)
- Weight: 115 kg (254 lb)

Sport
- Sport: Athletics
- Event: Discus throw
- Club: G.S. Fiamme Gialle
- Coached by: Lorenzo Campanelli

Achievements and titles
- Personal best: Discus throw: 67.36 m (2021)

Giovanni Faloci (13 October 1985) is an Italian discus thrower. He competed at the 2020 Summer Olympics, in Discus throw.

== Biography ==
Giovanni Faloci has 9 caps in national team from 2007. In his career, with Italy national athletics team, he participated at one edition of European Athletics Championships (2012), two of the Summer Universiade (2007 and 2011), one of the Mediterranean Games (2009), three of the European Team Championships (2010, 2011, 2013) and in 2013, with 64.77 m fifth best measure of all-time in Italy, he obtained the IAAF Standard for the 2013 World Championships in Athletics.

== Progression ==
Personal Best

| Year | Performance | Venue | Date |
|---|---|---|---|
| 2021 | 67.36 | (Italy) Spoleto | 29 June |
| 2020 | 61.87 | (Italy) Padua | 29 August |
| 2019 | 65.30 | (Italy) Latina | 6 July |
| 2018 | 64.19 | (Italy) Tarquinia | 13 June |
| 2017 | 63.66 | (Italy) San Benedetto del Tronto | 21 May |
| 2016 | 60.58 | (Portugal) Leiria | 30 April |
| 2015 | 62.50 | (Italy) Tarquinia | 21 May |
| 2014 | 62.07 | (Italy) Donnas | 13 July |
| 2013 | 64.77 | (Italy) Tarquinia | 4 June |
| 2012 | 64.24 | (Italy) Tarquinia | 27 May |
| 2011 | 63.89 | (Italy) Tarquinia | 9 June |
| 2010 | 62.19 | (Italy) Viterbo | 19 June |
| 2009 | 62.56 | (Italy) Fabriano | 16 May |
| 2008 | 61.19 | (Italy) Viterbo | 18 June |
| 2007 | 58.52 | (Italy) Rome | 11 February |
| 2006 | 60.38 | (Italy) Macerata | 20 May |
| 2005 | 57.49 | (Italy) Grosseto | 5 June |

== Achievements ==
| Year | Competition | Venue | Position | Event | Notes |
Representing Italy
| 2005 | European U23 Championships | Erfurt, Germany | 23rd (q) | Discus throw | 47.16 m |
| 2007 | European U23 Championships | Debrecen, Hungary | 7th | Discus throw | 55.84 m |
| 2011 | European Team Championships | Stockholm, Sweden | 9th | Discus throw | 56.09 m |
| 2011 | Summer Universiade | Shenzhen, China | 7th | Discus throw | 60.27 m |
| 2012 | European Championships | Helsinki, Finland | 25th (q) | Discus throw | 57.67 m |
| 2013 | European Team Championships | Gateshead, United Kingdom | 7th | Discus throw | 58.02 m |
| 2018 | Mediterranean Games | Tarragona, Spain | 4th | Discus throw | 60.16 m |
| 2018 | European Championships | Berlin, Germany | 21st (q) | Discus throw | 59.27 m |
| 2019 | World Championships | Doha, Qatar | 30th (q) | Discus throw | 59.77 m |
| 2021 | Olympic Games | Tokyo, Japan | 29th (q) | Discus throw | 57.33 m |
| 2022 | Mediterranean Games | Oran, Algeria | 10th | Discus throw | 57.30 m |

== National titles ==
He has won 13 times the individual national championship.

- Italian Athletics Championships
  - Discus throw: 2011, 2013, 2018, 2019, 2020, 2021, 2023 (7)
- Italian Winter Throwing Championships
  - Discus throw: 2009, 2010, 2012, 2016, 2019, 2023 (6)

== See also ==
- Italian all-time top lists - Discus throw
- Italy at the 2013 World Championships in Athletics
