= David Wrobel =

German discus thrower

Personal information
- Born: 13 February 1991 (age 35) Stuttgart, Germany
- Height: 1.95 m (6 ft 5 in)
- Weight: 130 kg (287 lb)

Sport
- Sport: Athletics
- Event: Discus throw
- Club: SC Magdeburg
- Coached by: Armin Lemme

David Wrobel (born 13 February 1991) is a German athlete specialising in the discus throw. He represented his country at the 2019 World Athletics Championships without qualifying for the final.

His personal best in the event is 67.30 metres set in Werferzentrum Brandberge, Halle in 2021.

== International competitions ==
Year	Competition	Venue	Position	Event	Notes
Representing Germany
2010	World Junior Championships	Moncton, Canada	9th	Discus throw (1.75 kg)	57.81 m
2013	European U23 Championships	Tampere, Finland	8th	Discus throw	57.25 m
2015	Military World Games	Mungyeong, South Korea	5th	Discus throw	60.02 m
2019	World Championships	Doha, Qatar	16th (q)	Discus throw	62.43 m
2021	Olympic Games	Tokyo, Japan	22nd (q)	Discus throw	60.38 m
