= Track and field at the 2015 Military World Games – Men's discus throw =

The men's discus throw event at the 2015 Military World Games was held on 8 October at the KAFAC Sports Complex.

== Records ==
Prior to this competition, the existing world and CISM record were as follows:

World Record	Jürgen Schult (GDR)	74.08	Neubrandenburg, East Germany	6 June 1986
CISM World Record	Robert Harting (GER)	67.89	Warendorf, Germany	15 September 2013

== Schedule ==
Date	Time	Round
8 October 2015	13:25	Final

== Medalists ==
Gold	Silver	Bronze
Zoltán Kővágó; Hungary	Piotr Małachowski; Poland	Mahmoud Samimi; Iran

== Results ==
=== Final ===
Rank	Athlete	Nationality	#1	#2	#3	#4	#5	#6	Mark	Notes
1st place, gold medalist(s)	Zoltán Kővágó	Hungary	61.54	66.01	x	x	65.47	x	66.01	
2nd place, silver medalist(s)	Piotr Małachowski	Poland	59.39	57.24	59.09	x	x	62.12	62.12	
3rd place, bronze medalist(s)	Mahmoud Samimi	Iran	58.01	57.30	60.10	x	x	60.97	60.97	
4	Martin Kupper	Estonia	59.76	59.49	60.92	x	59.04	60.78	60.92	
5	David Wrobel	Germany	55.14	57.49	60.02	x	58.36	x	60.02	
6	Markus Münch	Germany	57.76	59.55	59.27	58.57	59.24	57.95	59.55	
7	Eligijus Ruskys	Lithuania	58.14	56.68	56.35	x	55.52	x	58.14	
8	Sultan Al-Dawoodi	Saudi Arabia	56.84	57.77	x	57.92	x	56.26	57.92	
9	Ronald Julião	Brazil	56.33	56.55	56.88				56.88	
10	Przemysław Czajkowski	Poland	54.46	54.74	x				54.74	
11	Musab Momani	Jordan	52.34	53.97	x				53.97	
12	Lee Hoon	South Korea	x	52.37	x				52.37	
13	Khaled Mohammed Al-Moughanni	Qatar	49.14	x	x				49.14	
14	Abdurahman Al-Hashem	Kuwait	44.94	46.11	46.39				46.39	
