= Chad Wright =

Jamaican discus thrower

Personal information
- Full name: Chad Dimitri Wright
- Born: 25 March 1991 (age 35) Kingston, Jamaica
- Education: University of Nebraska–Lincoln
- Height: 1.87 m (6 ft 2 in)
- Weight: 142 kg (313 lb)

Sport
- Sport: Track and field Weightlifting
- Events: Discus throw, shot put
- Coached by: Derrick Spencer
Medal record
Men's athletics
Representing Jamaica
NACAC Championships
Bronze medal – third place	2025 Freeport	Discus throw
Central American and Caribbean Games
Gold medal – first place	2026 Santo Domingo	Discus throw
Gold medal – first place	2013 Morelia	Discus throw

Chad Dimitri Wright (born 25 March 1991) is a Jamaican athlete specialising in the discus throw. He became the first Jamaican to reach an Olympic men's discus final at the Tokyo 2021 Olympics.

== Career ==
He has represented Jamaica at the 2015 Beijing World Championships of Athletics and also at the 2019 Doha World Athletics Championships. He is a 2 time national champion in the men's discus. He is the 2013 Central American and Caribbean Games champion in the discus. He finished sixth at the 2014 Commonwealth Games and fourth at the 2015 Summer Universiade. He is the 2012 NCAA Discus Champion while representing the University of Nebraska - Lincoln.

== Weightlifting Career ==
In 2026, Wright sought to compete at the Commonwealth Games in two sports.. However, he competed in the 2026 CAC Games Weightlifting competition then won the Men's Discus competition days later.

== Competition record ==
Year	Competition	Venue	Position	Event	Notes
Representing Jamaica
2009	CARIFTA Games (U20)	Vieux Fort, Saint Lucia	6th	Shot put (6 kg)	15.95 m
2009	CARIFTA Games (U20)	Vieux Fort, Saint Lucia	3rd	Discus (1.75 kg)	50.62 m
2010	CARIFTA Games (U20)	George Town, Cayman Islands	3rd	Shot put (6 kg)	18.19 m
2010	CARIFTA Games (U20)	George Town, Cayman Islands	1st	Discus (1.75 kg)	63.11 m
2010	Central American and Caribbean; Junior Championships (U20)	Santo Domingo, Dom. Rep.	1st	Shot put (6 kg)	18.32 m
2010	Central American and Caribbean; Junior Championships (U20)	Santo Domingo, Dom. Rep.	2nd	Discus (1.75 kg)	60.52 m
2010	World Junior Championships	Moncton, Canada	13th (q)	Shot put (6 kg)	18.33 m
2010	World Junior Championships	Moncton, Canada	5th	Discus (1.75 kg)	60.33 m
2012	NACAC U23 Championships	Irapuato, Mexico	4th	Discus	56.92 m
2013	Central American and Caribbean Championships	Morelia, Mexico	1st	Discus	60.79 m
2014	Commonwealth Games	Glasgow, United Kingdom	6th	Discus	60.33 m
2015	Universiade	Gwangju, South Korea	4th	Discus	60.10 m
2015	World Championships	Beijing, China	17th (q)	Discus	61.53 m
2019	World Championships	Doha, Qatar	25th (q)	Discus	60.60 m
2021	Olympic Games	Tokyo, Japan	9th	Discus	62.56 m
2022	World Championships	Eugene, United States	25th (q)	Discus	60.31 m
2025	NACAC Championships	Freeport, Bahamas	3rd	Discus	62.85 m
2026	Central American and Caribbean Games	Santo Domingo, Dominican Republic	1st	Discus	63.39 m

== Personal bests ==
Outdoor

- Shot put – 19.39 (Columbus, OH 2013)
- Discus throw – 67.92 (Ramona, OK 2026)

Indoor

- Shot put – 19.02 (Geneva 2014)
