= Lolassonn Djouhan =

French discus thrower

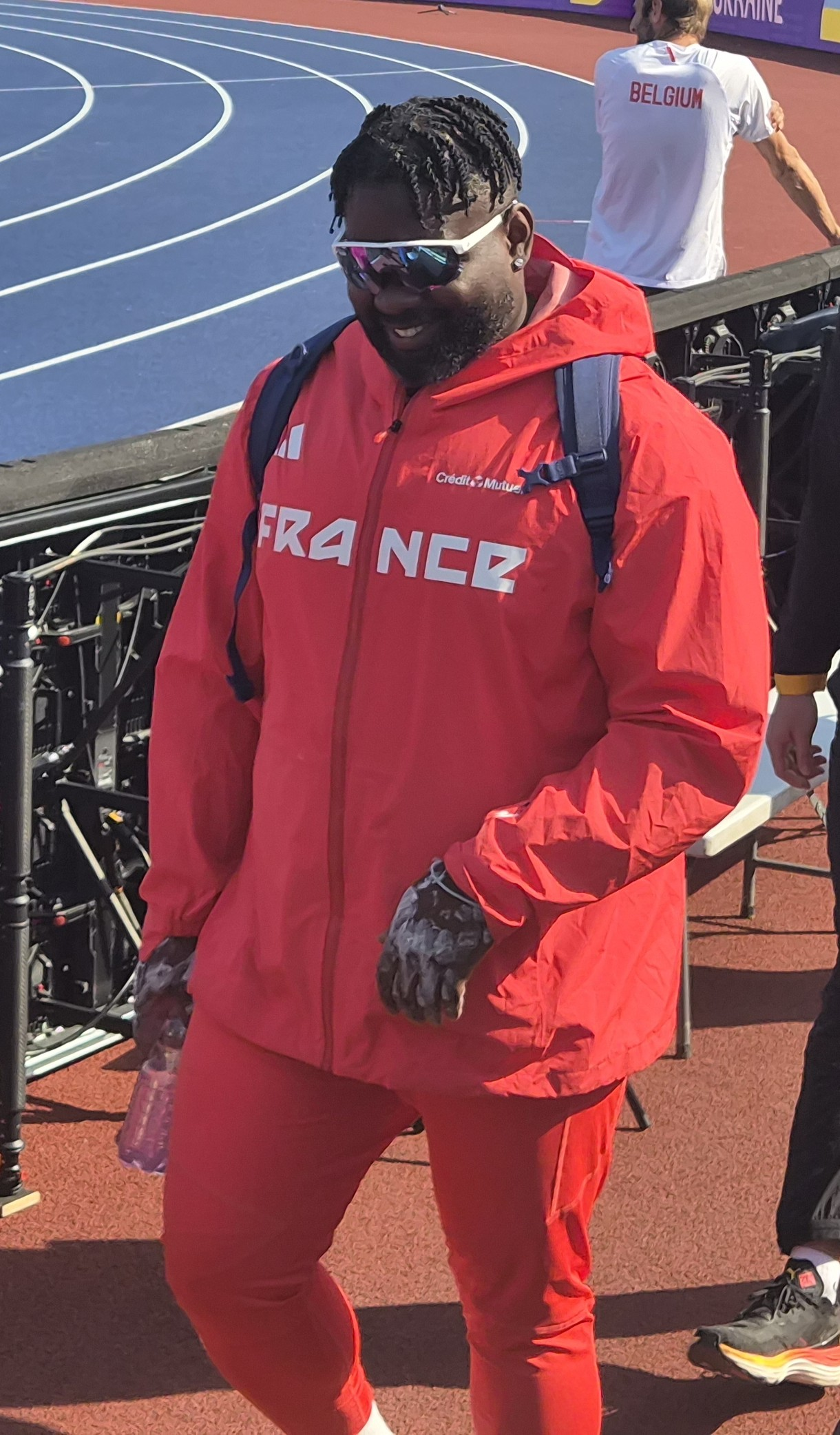
- Djouhan at the 2026 European Championships

Personal information
- Born: 18 May 1991 (age 35) Montargis, France
- Height: 1.88 m (6 ft 2 in)
- Weight: 118 kg (260 lb)

Sport
- Sport: Athletics
- Event: Discus throw
- Club: EC Orleans
- Coached by: Jacques Pelgas

Lolassonn Djouhan (born 18 May 1991 in Montargis) is a French athlete specialising in the discus throw. He represented his country at the 2017 World Championships missing the final by two centimetres.

His personal best in the event is 66.66 metres set in 2021 in Stade Fernand Bonnieu, Montélimar.

== International competitions ==
Year	Competition	Venue	Position	Event	Notes
Representing France
2009	European Junior Championships	Novi Sad, Serbia	19th (q)	Discus throw (1.75 kg)	51.77 m
2010	World Junior Championships	Moncton, Canada	33rd (q)	Discus throw (1.75 kg)	44.83 m
2011	European U23 Championships	Ostrava, Czech Republic	22nd (q)	Discus throw	53.54 m
2013	European U23 Championships	Tampere, Finland	10th	Discus throw	56.98 m
2013	Jeux de la Francophonie	Nice, France	4th	Discus throw	55.61 m
2017	World Championships	London, United Kingdom	13th (q)	Discus throw	63.21 m
2018	European Championships	Berlin, Germany	10th	Discus throw	61.89 m
2021	Olympic Games	Tokyo, Japan	21st (q)	Discus throw	60.74 m
2024	European Championships	Rome, Italy	19th (q)	Discus throw	60.80 m
2024	Olympic Games	Paris, France	19th (q)	Discus throw	61.93 m
2026	European Championships	Birmingham, United Kingdom	11th	Discus throw	62.28 m
