= Simon Pettersson =

Swedish discus thrower

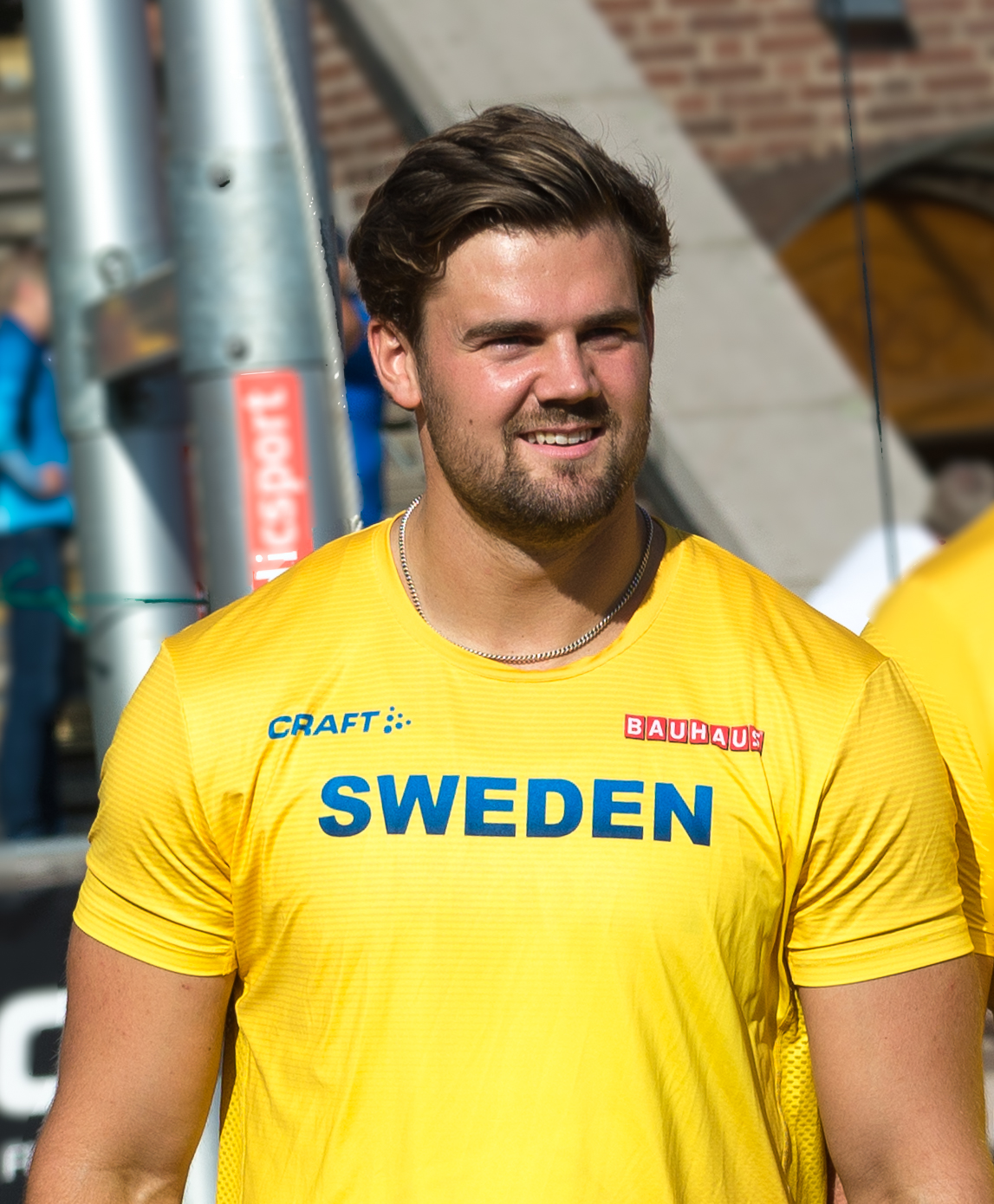
- Pettersson in 2019

Personal information
- Born: 3 January 1994 (age 32)
- Height: 1.98 m (6 ft 6 in)
- Weight: 105 kg (231 lb)

Sport
- Sport: Athletics
- Event: Discus throw
- Club: Hässelby SK
- Coached by: Vésteinn Hafsteinsson
Medal record
Men's athletics
Representing Sweden
Olympic Games
Silver medal – second place	2020 Tokyo	Discus throw

Simon Pettersson (born 3 January 1994) is a Swedish athlete specialising in the discus throw. He represented his country at the 2017 World Championships finishing eleventh in the final and the 2018 European Championships finishing fourth in the final.

His personal best in the event is 70.42 metres set in Norrköping, Sweden in August 2022, at the Swedish championship where he also won gold medal. Earlier in his career he competed in the decathlon.

Pettersson competed at the 2020 Summer Olympics, winning the silver medal with a throw of 67.39 metres.

== International competitions ==
Year	Competition	Venue	Position	Event	Notes
Representing Sweden
2013	European Junior Championships	Rieti, Italy	17th (q)	Discus throw (1.5 kg)	53.06 m
2015	European U23 Championships	Tallinn, Estonia	5th	Discus throw	58.05 m
2017	World Championships	London, United Kingdom	11th	Discus throw	60.39 m
2018	European Championships	Berlin, Germany	4th	Discus throw	64.55 m
2019	World Championships	Doha, Qatar	9th	Discus throw	63.72 m
2021	Olympic Games	Tokyo, Japan	2nd	Discus throw	67.39 m
2022	World Championships	Eugene, United States	5th	Discus throw	67.00 m
2022	European Championships	Munich, Germany	4th	Discus throw	67.12 m
2023	World Championships	Budapest, Hungary	21st (q)	Discus throw	62.53 m
2024	European Championships	Rome, Italy	16th (q)	Discus throw	61.43 m
