= János Huszák =

Hungarian discus thrower

Personal information
- Born: 5 February 1992 (age 33)

Sport
- Country: Hungary
- Sport: Track and field
- Event: Discus throw

János Huszák (born 5 February 1992) is a Hungarian discus thrower.

He finished sixth at the 2015 Universiade, and again at the 2017 Universiade. He competed at the 2010 World Junior Championships, the 2013 European U23 Championships and the 2016 European Championships without reaching the final.

His personal best throw is 65.54 metres, achieved in September 2021 in Bregyó Athletic Center, Székesfehérvár.
