= Mason Finley =

American athlete (born 1990)

Personal information
- Nationality: American
- Born: October 7, 1990 (age 36) Kansas City, Missouri, U.S.
- Height: 6 ft 8 in (203 cm)
- Weight: 350 lb (159 kg)

Sport
- Sport: Shot put, discus throw
- College team: University of Wyoming
Medal record
Men's athletics
Representing the United States
World Championships
Bronze medal – third place	2017 London	Discus throw
Summer Universiade
Bronze medal – third place	2011 Shenzhen	Shot put
Pan American Junior Championships
Gold medal – first place	2009 Port of Spain	Shot put
Gold medal – first place	2009 Port of Spain	Discus throw

Mason Finley (born October 7, 1990), is an American shot putter and discus thrower. He was on the track and field team at the University of Kansas before transferring to the University of Wyoming. He qualified for the 2020 Summer Olympics in discus.

== Early life ==
Finley was born in Kansas City, Missouri. He attended Buena Vista High School (where he also played basketball and football) in Buena Vista, Colorado, and then the University of Kansas, before transferring to the University of Wyoming.

For his high school dominance, Finley was named to the ESPN RISE 2000s All-Decade High School Track & Field Team. He was also Track and Field News "High School Athlete of the Year" in 2009.

== Career ==
Finley set a Colorado high school record in discus with a throw of 236 feet 6 inches (72.09 m) during the High Altitude Challenge in Alamosa, Colorado. He also won gold medals in shot put and discus throw at the 2009 Pan American Junior Athletics Championships in Port of Spain, Trinidad. As a freshman at Kansas, he was All American in the shot put and the discus. His best throws as a freshman were 60.12m (197–3 ft.) in the discus and 20.68 meters (67–10.25 ft.) in the shot.

In 2017 Finley won the bronze medal in the discus throw event at the World Championships in London, throwing 68.03 meters. This breaks an 18-year drought of no American medalists in the discus throw, and marks the first time an American has placed in the men's discus throw since the World Championships in Seville, where Anthony Washington won the gold medal.

He qualified for the 2020 Summer Olympics after placing first in qualification with a throw of 63.07 metres (206.9 ft).

Awards
Preceded by German Fernandez	Track & Field News High School Boys Athlete of the Year; 2009	Succeeded by Sam Crouser
