= Lukas Weißhaidinger =

Austrian athlete (born 1992)

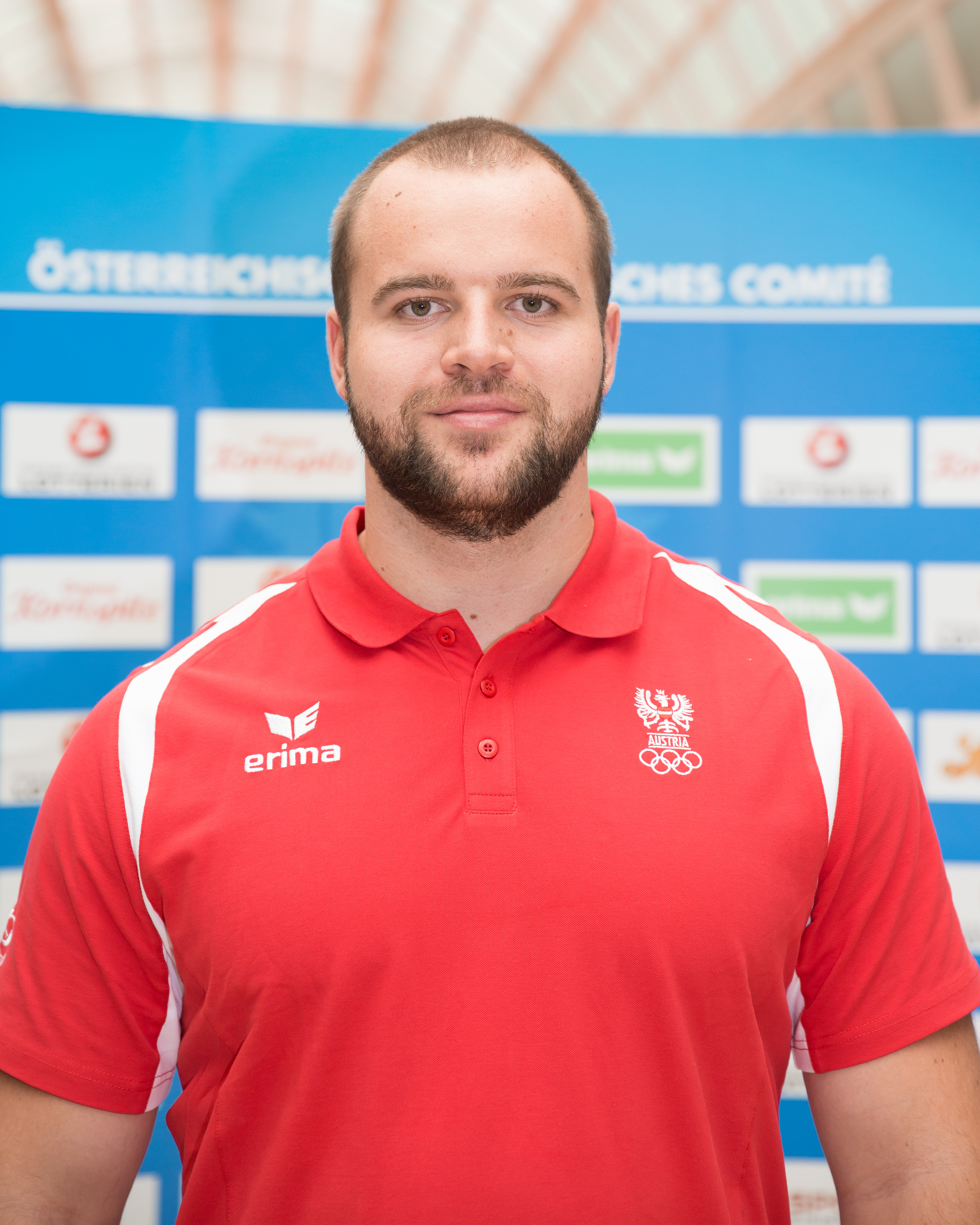
- Weisshaidinger in 2016

Personal information
- Nationality: Austrian
- Born: 20 February 1992 (age 34) Schärding, Austria
- Height: 1.97 m (6 ft 6 in)
- Weight: 130 kg (287 lb)

Sport
- Country: Austria
- Sport: Athletics
- Events: Discus throw Shot put
- Club: ÖTB-OÖ Leichtathletik
- Coached by: Josef "Sepp" Schopf

Achievements and titles
- Personal bests: DT: 70.68 (2023); SP: 19.32 (2013)
Medal record
Representing Austria
Olympic Games
Bronze medal – third place	2020 Tokyo	Discus throw
World Championships
Bronze medal – third place	2019 Doha	Discus throw
European Championships
Silver medal – second place	2024 Rome	Discus throw
Bronze medal – third place	2018 Berlin	Discus throw
European Junior Championships
Gold medal – first place	2011 Tallinn	Discus throw
European Youth Olympic Festival
Gold medal – first place	2009 Tampere	Discus throw
Gold medal – first place	2009 Tampere	Shot put

Lukas Weißhaidinger (born 20 February 1992) is an Austrian discus thrower and shot putter. He was European junior discus champion in 2011 and holds the Austrian record in men's discus throw. He won bronze medals at the 2018 European Championships, 2019 World Athletics Championships, and 2020 Summer Olympics.

== Career ==
In his childhood Weißhaidinger competed in gymnastics, but dropped that sport after growing too tall and concentrated on athletics. Weißhaidinger won gold in both the shot (20.35 m/5 kg) and the discus (60.94 m/1.5 kg) at the 2009 European Youth Olympic Festival in Tampere. He also competed in both events at the 2009 World Youth Championships and the 2010 World Junior Championships; in the shot he placed fourth in 2009 and sixth in 2010, while in the discus he went out in qualifying both times.

In 2011 Weißhaidinger set Austrian junior records in both the shot and the discus and won gold in the discus at the European Junior Championships in Tallinn (63.83 m/1.75 kg); in the shot he placed fifth. He was the first Austrian since Günther Weidlinger and Linda Horvath in 1997 to win a European junior title.

Weißhaidinger broke the Austrian under-23 shot put record in 2012, throwing 19.22 m. He was a finalist in both the shot and the discus at the 2013 European U23 Championships, but did not place in the top six in either event. Weißhaidinger first broke 60 metres with the men's 2 kg discus in 2014, throwing 60.02 m in April and 60.68 m in May; he was the first Austrian under-23 thrower to exceed 60 metres, breaking Gerhard Mayer's national under-23 record from 2001.

Weißhaidinger competed in the shot at the 2015 European Indoor Championships, but was eliminated in the qualification. Outdoors, he improved his personal best in the discus several times, reaching 63.13 m in July; on 1 August, helped by perfect wind conditions and a new technique, he threw 67.24 m in Schwechat, improving his personal best by more than four metres and breaking Gerhard Mayer's Austrian record of 67.20 m. The mark also exceeded the qualifying standards for the 2015 World Championships and the 2016 Summer Olympics; at the time, it ranked him fourth on the 2015 world list.

In the 2016 Summer Olympics he qualified for the final round and finished sixth with 64.95 m. The same year, he won the IAAF World Challenge events in Madrid and ISTAF Berlin.

The 2017 season, he started off earlier than usual with participating at the indoor ISTAF Berlin, one of the few indoor events for discus throwers finishing third with a 62.23 m. In March he competed in the 2017 European Cup Winter Throwing which he won with 65.73 m, which also means qualifying for the 2017 World Championships in Athletics.

During his career, he was awarded numerous awards. In the election for the Austrian track and field athlete of the year, held by the Austrian Athletics Federation, he has been elected once "Track and Field Newcomer of the Year" and twice "Track and Field Athlete of the Year" in 2009, 2015 and 2016 respectively. His biggest award, "Newcomer of the Year", was awarded to him in 2016.

Early in the 2018 season, Weißhaidinger threw 68.98 m, setting the new Austrian record in men's discus throw. At the 2018 European Championships Weißhaidinger qualified for the final in the second last place with a throw of 62.26 m. In the final he threw 65.14 m on his fifth attempt, earning him a bronze medal.

During the 2019 World Athletics Championships Weißhaidinger again barely made the final in the last place with a throw of 63.31 m. In the final he threw 66.82 m on his third attempt, securing him a bronze medal.

In 2021, he won the bronze medal in the 2020 Summer Olympics. It is the first ever Olympic medal for Austria in men's athletics.

== Fanclub ==
Weißhaidinger is supported by his own fan club, which is called the "Lucky Luky Fanclub" and is based in Taufkirchen an der Pram.

== Honors ==
- On 27 October 2016 Lukas Weißhaidinger was awarded the 2016 Rising Star of the Year prize at the Lotteries Gala Night of Sports.
- On 28 July 2021 an asteroid was named after him: (341317) Weisshaidinger.
