= Andrius Gudžius =

Lithuanian discus thrower (born 1991)

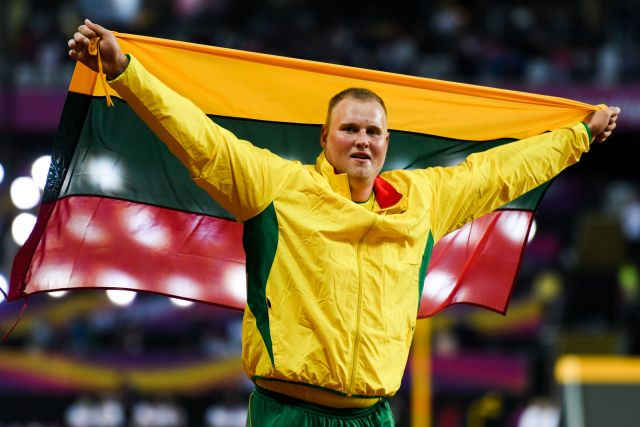
- Gudžius during 2017 World Championships

Personal information
- Born: 14 February 1991 (age 35) Kaunas, Lithuania
- Height: 1.99 m (6 ft 6 in)
- Weight: 136 kg (300 lb)
Medal record
Men's athletics
Representing Lithuania
World Championships
Gold medal – first place	2017 London	Discus throw
Bronze medal – third place	2022 Eugene	Discus throw
European Championships
Gold medal – first place	2018 Berlin	Discus throw
European Games
Bronze medal – third place	2023 Kraków-Małopolska	Discus throw
Universiade
Bronze medal – third place	2015 Gwangju	Discus throw
World Junior Championships in Athletics
Gold medal – first place	2010 Moncton	Discus throw
World Youth Championships in Athletics
Bronze medal – third place	2007 Ostrava	Discus throw

Andrius Gudžius (born 14 February 1991) is a Lithuanian discus thrower. Gudzius won the gold medal at the 2017 World Championships. He competed at the 2020 and 2024 Olympic Games. Gudzius has a personal best of 69.59 m achieved in 2018.

== Career ==
He won the gold medal in the discus throw at the 2010 IAAF World Junior Championships held at the Croix-Bleue Medavie Stadium, Moncton, Canada. He won the gold medal at the 2013 European Athletics U23 Championships in Tampere, Finland. He won the 2014 European Athletics Team Championships in Tallinn, Estonia.

Gudzius won the gold medal at the Senior 2017 World Championships in Athletics in London, England on 4 August 2017. In August 2017, he won the Diamond League final in Brussels, Belgium. He won the gold medal at the 2018 European Championships in Berlin, Germany managing a throw of 68.46 metres. He finished third at the IAAF Continental Cup in Ostrava, Czech Republic in September 2018.

He finished in sixth place overall at the delayed 2020 Olympic Games held in Tokyo, Japan, in July 2021. He won the bronze medal at the 2022 World Championships in Eugene, Oregon with a best discus throw of 67.55 metres.

In June 2023, he placed second in the second division event at the European Athletics Team Championships in Silesia, Poland with a throw of 64.94 metres. He finished in sixth place overall at the 2023 World Athletics Championships held in Budapest, Hungary in August 2023.

He finished in eighth place at the 2024 Olympic Games in Paris, France in August 2024 with a best distance of 66.55 metres.

== International competitions ==
Year	Competition	Venue	Position	Event	Notes
Representing Lithuania
2007	World Youth Championships	Ostrava, Czech Republic	3rd	Discus (1.5 kg)	61.59 m
2008	World Junior Championships	Bydgoszcz, Poland	6th	Discus (1.75 kg)	58.63 m
2009	European Junior Championships	Novi Sad, Serbia	5th	Discus (1.75 kg)	60.05 m
2010	World Junior Championships	Moncton, Canada	1st	Discus (1.75 kg)	63.78 m
2011	European U23 Championships	Ostrava, Czech Republic	13th (q)	Discus throw	56.58 m
2011	Universiade	Shenzhen, China	13th (q)	Discus throw	56.59 m
2013	European U23 Championships	Tampere, Finland	1st	Discus throw	62.40 m
2014	European Championships	Zürich, Switzerland	10th	Discus throw	60.82 m
2015	Universiade	Gwangju, South Korea	3rd	Discus throw	62.54 m
2015	World Championships	Beijing, China	14th (q)	Discus throw	62.22 m
2016	European Championships	Amsterdam, Netherlands	13th (q)	Discus throw	63.60 m
2016	Olympic Games	Rio de Janeiro, Brazil	12th	Discus throw	60.66 m
2017	World Championships	London, United Kingdom	1st	Discus throw	69.21 m
2018	European Championships	Berlin, Germany	1st	Discus throw	68.46 m
2019	World Championships	Doha, Qatar	12th	Discus throw	61.55 m
2021	Olympic Games	Tokyo, Japan	6th	Discus throw	64.11 m
2022	World Championships	Eugene, United States	3rd	Discus throw	67.55 m
2022	European Championships	Munich, Germany	6th	Discus throw	65.40 m
2023	World Championships	Budapest, Hungary	6th	Discus throw	66.16 m
2024	European Championships	Rome, Italy	7th	Discus throw	64.43 m
2024	Olympic Games	Paris, France	8th	Discus throw	66.55 m

Awards
Preceded by Aurimas Didžbalis	Lithuanian Sportsman of the Year; 2017, 2018	Succeeded by Danas Rapšys
