= 2019 Russian Athletics Championships =

- Dates: 24–27 July 2019
- Host city: Cheboksary
- Venue: Olympic Stadium
- Events: 40
- Participation: 731 athletes

The 2019 Russian Athletics Championships was held from 24–27 July at the Olympic Stadium in Cheboksary. It was the seventh time that the capital of the Chuvash Republic hosted the event. The four-day competition featured 40 track and field events and was attended by 731 athletes from 72 regions of the country.

== Championships ==
During 2018, Russian championships were held in various cities in individual athletics disciplines:

- 30 March — Russian Championships in mountain running (uphill) (Zheleznovodsk)
- 26 April — Russian Championships in cross country running (spring) (Suzdal)
- 5 May — Russian Championships in marathon (Kazan)
- 10—11 May — Russian Championships in 24-hour run (Moscow)
- 18 May — Russian Championships in mountain running (uphill-downhill) (Toksovo)
- 14—16 June — Russian Championships in combined track and field events (Smolensk)
- 15—16 June — Russian Championships in racewalking (Cheboksary)
- 6 July — Russian Championships in trail running (Karpinsk)
- 8—9 September — Russian Championships in relay (Adlersky City District)
- 15 September — Russian Championships in half marathon (Yaroslavl)
- 15 September — Russian Championships in 100 kilometres (Bryansk)
- 12—13 October — Russian Championships in cross country running (autumn) (Orenburg)
- 30 October — Russian Championships in mountain running (long-distance) (Krasnaya Polyana)

== Track and field ==
=== Men ===
Event	Gold		Silver		Bronze	
100 metres	Rushan Abdulkaderov; Moscow	10.44	Aleksey Laptev; Sverdlovsk Oblast	10.54	Aleksey Usov; Moscow	10.56
200 metres	Andrey Lukin; Karelia	20.57	Ilfat Sadeev; Ulyanovsk Oblast	20.83	Anton Novikov; Moscow	20.88
400 metres	Aleksandr Buyanovskiy; Samara Oblast	45.98	Artem Araslanov; Moscow/Kirov Oblast	46.39	Mikhail Filatov; Saint Petersburg	46.44
800 metres	Konstantin Kholmogorov; Moscow/Perm Krai	1:46.51	Konstantin Tolokonnikov; Moscow Oblast/Rostov Oblast	1:48.42	Nikolay Verbitskiy; Moscow Oblast/Buryatiya	1:48.67
1500 metres	Valentin Smirnov; Saint Petersburg/Chelyabinsk Oblast	3:41.80	Konstantin Plokhotnikov; Krasnodar Krai	3:41.86	Maksim Aleksandrov; Saint Petersburg/Novosibirsk Oblast	3:42.95
5000 metres	Vladimir Nikitin; Moscow/Perm Krai	13:22.72	Evgeniy Rybakov; Kemerovo Oblast	13:25.12	Anatoliy Rybakov; Kemerovo Oblast	13:26.35
10,000 metres	Evgeniy Rybakov; Kemerovo Oblast	28:18.90	Anatoliy Rybakov; Kemerovo Oblast	28:18.91	Vyacheslav Shalamov; Krasnodar Krai	29:04.58
3000 m s'chase	Konstantin Plokhotnikov; Krasnodar Krai	8:29.85	Maksim Yakushev; Sverdlovsk Oblast	8:33.52	Yuriy Kloptsov; Moscow/Altai Krai	8:34.32
110 m hurdles	Konstantin Shabanov; Moscow/Pskov Oblast	13.67	Artem Makarenko; Moscow/Krasnoyarsk Krai	13.73	Filipp Shabanov; Moscow/Pskov Oblast	13.88
400 m hurdles	Aleksandr Skorobogatko; Tyumen Oblast	49.83	Denis Kudryavtsev; Tyumen Oblast	49.96	Timofey Chalyy; Krasnoyarsk Krai/Moscow Oblast	50.25
High jump	Mikhail Akimenko; Moscow/Kabardino-Balkaria	2.33 m	Daniil Tsyplakov; Krasnodar Krai/Khabarovsk Krai	2.28 m	Nikita Anishchenkov; Moscow/Chelyabinsk Oblast Ilya Ivanyuk; Bryansk Oblast/Smolensk Oblast Aleksandr Asanov; Moscow	2.24 m
Pole vault	Ilya Mudrov; Moscow Oblast/Yaroslavl Oblast	5.65 m	Georgiy Gorokhov; Moscow/Bryansk Oblast	5.55 m	Dmitriy Zhelyabin; Moscow/Stavropol Krai	5.55 m
Long jump	Artem Primak; Krasnodar Krai/Khabarovsk Krai	8.01 m (+1.4 m/s)	Pavel Shalin; Moscow/Lipetsk Oblast	7.88 m (+0.3 m/s)	Denis Bogdanov; Volgograd Oblast/Moscow	7.87 m (+0.2 m/s)
Triple jump	Dmitriy Sorokin; Krasnodar Krai	17.31 m (0.0 m/s)	Aleksandr Yurchenko; Moscow Oblast/Samara Oblast	16.77 m (0.0 m/s)	Aleksey Fyodorov; Moscow Oblast/Smolensk Oblast	16.68 m (0.0 m/s)
Shot put	Aleksandr Lesnoy; Krasnodar Krai/Nizhny Novgorod Oblast	20.56 m	Konstantin Lyadusov; Moscow/Rostov Oblast	20.02 m	Maksim Afonin; Moscow/Moscow Oblast	19.83 m
Discus throw	Aleksey Khudyakov; Moscow/Nizhny Novgorod Oblast	62.45 m	Viktor Butenko; Moscow	61.42 m	Gleb Sidorchenko; Moscow/Stavropol Krai	60.57 m
Hammer throw	Evgeniy Korotovskiy; Moscow/Smolensk Oblast	77.17 m	Aleksey Sokirskiy; Krasnodar Krai	75.63 m	Denis Lukyanov; Moscow Oblast/Rostov Oblast	75.35 m
Javelin throw	Dmitriy Tarabin; Krasnodar Krai/Moscow Oblast	80.49 m	Nikolay Orlov; Moscow Oblast	77.62 m	Boris Bezdolnyy; Krasnodar Krai	72.82 m
4 × 100 m relay	Krasnodar Krai; Dmitriy Khomutov; Dmitriy Lopin; Ruslan Perestyuk; Evgeniy Plokhoy	40.02	Saint Petersburg; Ivan Sharov; Dmitriy Shkuropatov; Kirill Chernukhin; Artur Reysbikh	40.37	Vologda Oblast; Maksim Novoslugin; Konstantin Petryashov; Danil Roslyakov; Mark Tsypkus	40.39
4 × 400 m relay	Saint Petersburg; Maksim Rafilovich; Kirill Luzhinskiy; Andrey Kukharenko; Mikhail Filatov	3:07.26	Moscow Oblast; Leonid Karasev; Timofey Chalyy; Egor Filippov; Yaroslav Tkalich	3:08.24	Moscow; Dmitriy Efimov; Nikita Evseenkov; Anton Novikov; Artem Araslanov	3:08.61

=== Women ===
Event	Gold		Silver		Bronze	
100 metres	Kristina Sivkova; Moscow	11.35	Elena Chernyaeva; Saint Petersburg/Vologda Oblast	11.52	Natalya Pogrebnyak; Krasnodar Krai	11.55
200 metres	Elena Chernyaeva; Saint Petersburg/Vologda Oblast	23.16	Natalya Pogrebnyak; Krasnodar Krai	23.25	Marina Maksimova; Nizhny Novgorod Oblast/Chuvashia	23.44
400 metres	Antonina Krivoshapka; Moscow/Volgograd Oblast	51.25	Kseniya Aksenova; Sverdlovsk Oblast/Yamalo-Nenets Autonomous Okrug	51.75	Alena Mamina; Moscow Oblast/Sverdlovsk Oblast	52.08
800 metres	Aleksandra Gulyaeva; Moscow/Ivanovo Oblast	2:00.24	Vera Vasileva; Chuvashia	2:02.45	Ekaterina Kupina; Kursk Oblast	2:02.73
1500 metres	Aleksandra Gulyaeva; Moscow/Ivanovo Oblast	4:04.92	Dina Aleksandrova; Kursk Oblast	4:07.25	Ekaterina Storozheva; Moscow Oblast/Saint Petersburg	4:08.35
5000 metres	Svetlana Aplachkina; Voronezh Oblast	15:22.14	Elena Korobkina; Moscow/Lipetsk Oblast	15:22.17	Elena Sedova; Moscow Oblast/Novosibirsk Oblast	15:43.27
10,000 metres	Elena Korobkina; Moscow/Lipetsk Oblast	32:16.01	Elena Sedova; Moscow Oblast/Novosibirsk Oblast	32:20.45	Lyudmila Lebedeva; Moscow/Mari El	32:28.45
3000 m s'chase	Anna Tropina; Sverdlovsk Oblast	9:31.86	Natalya Koloskova; Moscow/Primorsky Krai	9:38.18	Anna Petrova; Saint Petersburg/Vologda Oblast	9:47.84
100 m hurdles	Anastasiya Nikolaeva; Moscow Oblast/Samara Oblast	13.33	Nina Morozova; Krasnodar Krai/Bryansk Oblast	13.40	Irina Manakova; Moscow/Saint Petersburg	13.43
400 m hurdles	Vera Rudakova; Moscow/Perm Krai	55.57	Valeriya Andreeva; Moscow Oblast/Samara Oblast	55.91	Anastasiya Kibakina; Ulyanovsk Oblast	57.29
High jump	Mariya Lasitskene; Moscow Oblast/Kabardino-Balkaria	2.00 m	Anna Chicherova; Moscow/Rostov Oblast	1.91 m	Tatyana Odineva; Moscow Aleksandra Yaryshkina; Moscow	1.91 m
Pole vault	Anzhelika Sidorova; Moscow/Chuvashia	4.86 m	Angelina Krasnova; Moscow/Irkutsk Oblast	4.61 m	Irina Ivanova; Omsk Oblast	4.56 m
Long jump	Darya Klishina; Moscow/Tver Oblast	6.82 m (0.0 m/s)	Yelena Sokolova; Moscow/Belgorod Oblast	6.70 m (0.0 m/s)	Polina Lukyanenkova; Krasnodar Krai	6.61 m (0.0 m/s)
Triple jump	Darya Nidbaykina; Moscow/Bryansk Oblast	14.50 m (+0.8 m/s)	Anna Krylova; Tatarstan	13.89 m (+0.4 m/s)	Natalya Yevdokimova; Moscow	13.81 m (+0.4 m/s)
Shot put	Alena Gordeeva; Moscow/Tver Oblast	18.25 m	Anna Avdeeva; Samara Oblast	18.05 m	Evgeniya Soloveva; Moscow Oblast/Chelyabinsk Oblast	17.70 m
Discus throw	Ekaterina Strokova; Moscow/Nizhny Novgorod Oblast	63.06 m	Natalya Karpova; Omsk Oblast/Saint Petersburg	59.68 m	Yelena Panova; Moscow/Vladimir Oblast	58.48 m
Hammer throw	Elizaveta Tsareva; Moscow Oblast/Rostov Oblast	71.94 m	Sofya Palkina; Moscow Oblast/Samara Oblast	69.33 m	Alena Lysenko; Moscow/Vladimir Oblast	65.09 m
Javelin throw	Mariya Rybnikova; Voronezh Oblast	58.30 m	Vera Rebrik; Moscow	56.02 m	Mariya Kurbatova; Rostov Oblast	50.93 m
4 × 100 m relay	Saint Petersburg; Vera Alymova; Elena Chernyaeva; Ekaterina Bleskina; Anastasiya Grigoreva	44.62	Novosibirsk Oblast; Veronika Pechenkina; Ekaterina Tropina; Anastasiya Bragina; Tamara Slastnikova	45.64	Penza Oblast; Angelina Starodubova; Kristina Khorosheva; Valeriya Muromskaya; Darya Tryalina	45.76
4 × 400 m relay	Moscow Oblast; Anastasiya Bednova; Valeriya Andreeva; Yuliya Spiridonova; Alena Mamina	3:30.54	Moscow; Ekaterina Renzhina; Irina Kolesnichenko; Elizaveta Anikienko; Nadezhda Kotlyarova	3:31.35	Perm Krai; Liliya Gabdullina; Vera Rudakova; Elizaveta Matveeva; Elena Zuykevich	3:37.16

== Mountain Running ==
The 20th Russian Mountain Running Championship (uphill) was held on 30 March at Mount Beshtau in Zheleznovodsk, Stavropol Krai. A total of 72 participants (46 men and 26 women) from 25 regions of the country started the competition.

=== Men ===
Event	Gold		Silver		Bronze	
7 km perepad vysot:/+888 m −102 m	Yuriy Tambasov; Voronezh Oblast	40:37	Gennadiy Egorov; Tatarstan	40:40	Aleksey Pagnuev; Sverdlovsk Oblast	40:53

=== Women ===
Event	Gold		Silver		Bronze	
7 km perepad vysot:/+888 m −102 m	Marina Titova; Samara Oblast	51:06	Anastasiya Kozina; Samara Oblast	51:21	Anastasiya Rudnaya; Saint Petersburg	51:34

== Spring Cross Country ==
The 2019 Russian Spring Cross Championships was held on 26 April in the city of Suzdal, Vladimir Oblast. The course was in a looped format on a kilometre-long course with numerous turns. Four senior races were attended by 97 runners (53 men and 44 women) from 35 regions of Russia. For the first time since 2004, the spring cross championship was not held in Zhukovsky, Moscow Oblast. Suzdal became only the fifth city to host the country's championship in cross country running.

=== Men ===
Event	Gold		Silver		Bronze	
Cross country 4 km	Nikolay Gorin; Moscow/Mordovia	11:39	Aleksey Popov; Voronezh Oblast	11:43	Vildan Gadelshin; Bashkortostan	11:50
Cross country 8 km	Mikhail Strelkov; Moscow; Oryol Oblast	24:09	Sergey Popov; Voronezh Oblast	24:17	Denis Chertykov; Khakassia	24:18

=== Women ===
Event	Gold		Silver		Bronze	
Cross country 2 km	Ekaterina Storozheva; Moscow Oblast/Saint Petersburg	6:20	Anna Kupaeva; Murmansk Oblast	6:23	Natalya Aristarkhova; Krasnoyarsk Krai	6:25
Cross country 5 km	Kseniya Makhneva; Chuvashia	16:44	Natalya Leonteva; Moscow	16:49	Elena Sedova; Moscow Oblast/Novosibirsk Oblast	17:01

== Marathon ==
The 2019 Russian Marathon Championships was held on 5 May in the city of Kazan as part of the Kazan Marathon. The course had an incline in the first half around the Millennium Bridge, but the rest of the course was flat.

Prior to the event, Stepan Kiselev and Iskander Yadgarov had promoted the idea of a duel between the two on social media, with the organizers of the marathon casting it as a professional versus amateur contest. Yadgarov, a programmer at Yandex, said he would take on professional Russian marathon runners, with national champion Kiselev serving as his role model. Competitions were held in warm and sunny weather (about 20 degrees Celsius at the finish). A total of 81 marathon runners (49 men and 32 women) from 34 regions of Russia were at the start line. The reigning champion, Alexei Reunkov, did not defend his title due to an injured Achilles tendon.

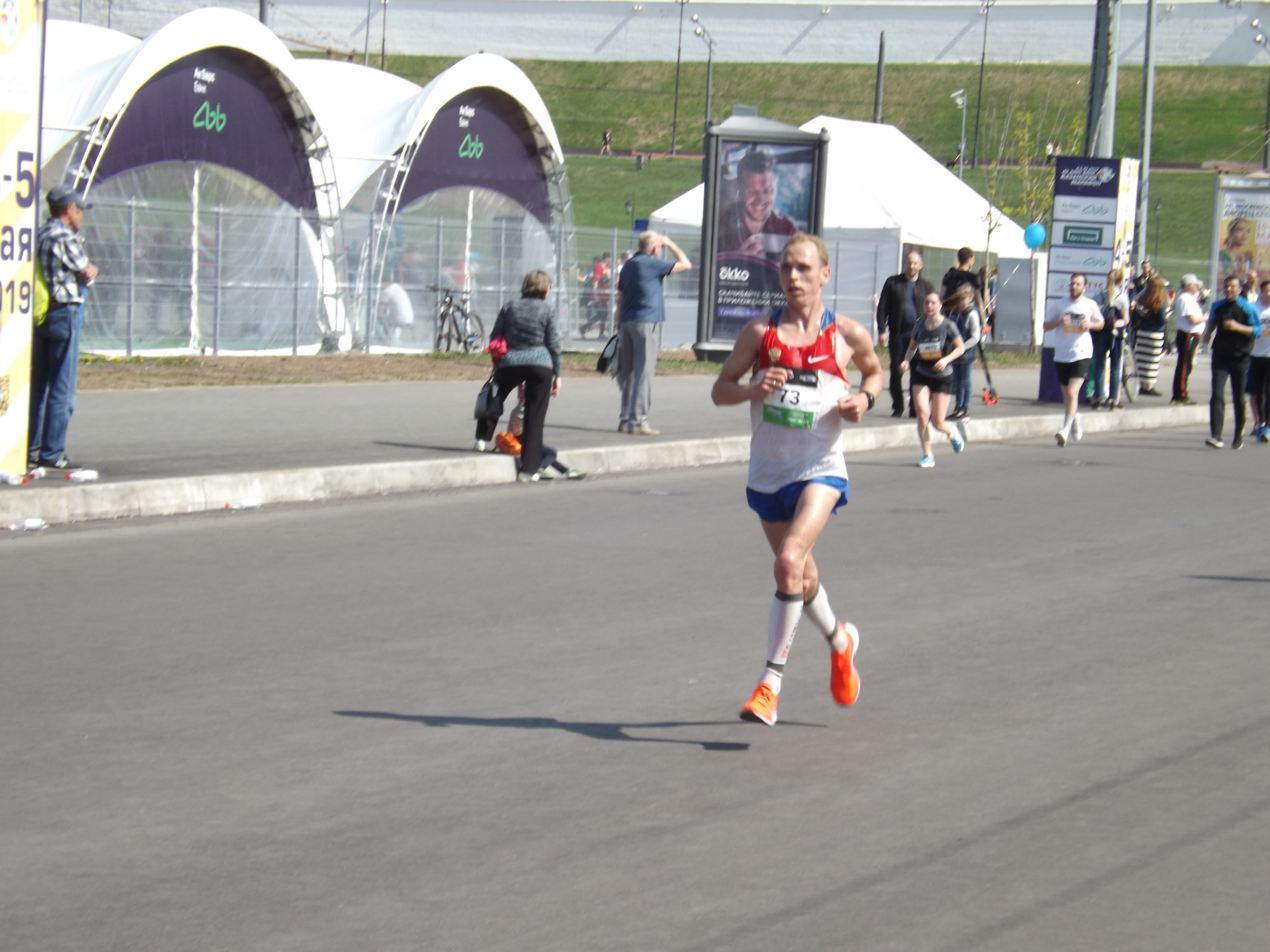
Andrey Leyman

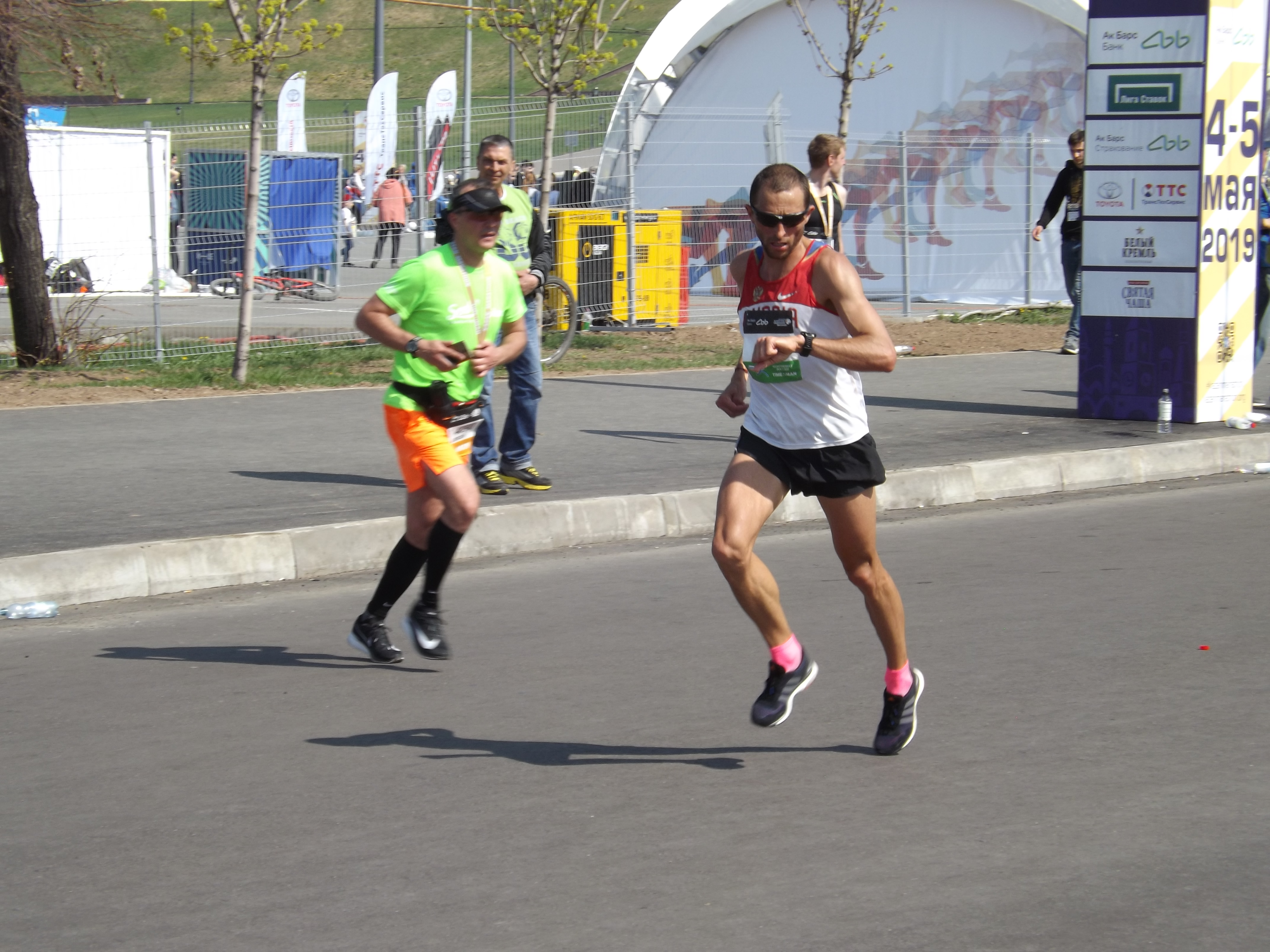
Yuriy Chechun

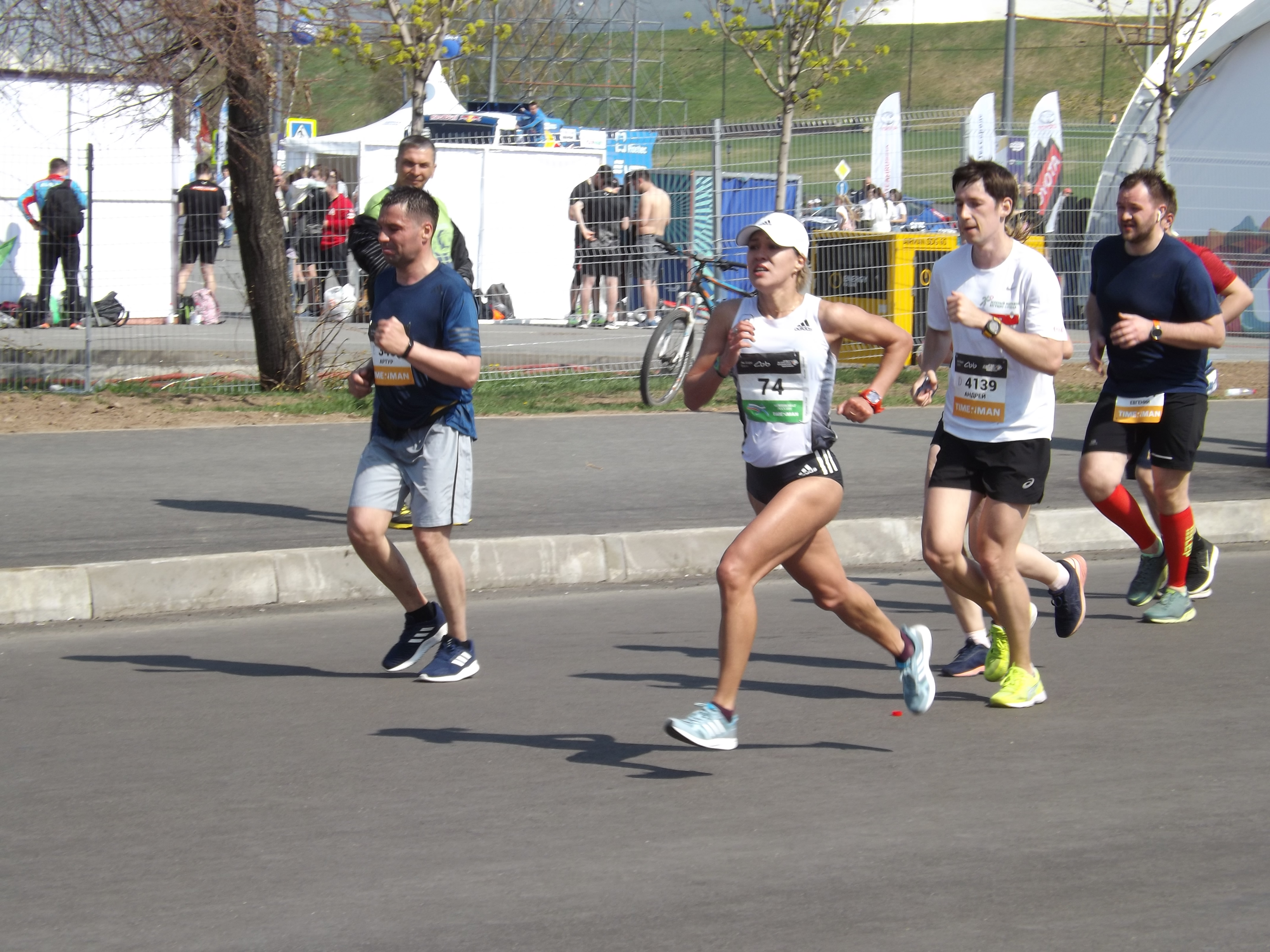
Sardana Trofimova

=== Men ===
Event	Gold		Silver		Bronze	
Marathon	Stepan Kiselev; Tatarstan	2:12:56	Andrey Leyman; Krasnodar Krai	2:14:11	Yuriy Chechun; Samara Oblast	2:15:29

=== Women ===
Event	Gold		Silver		Bronze	
Marathon	Sardana Trofimova; Sakha-Sakha Republic	2:31:31	Irina Sergeyeva; Kursk Oblast	2:31:58	Alina Prokopeva; Moscow Oblast/Chuvashia	2:34:11

== 24-hour run ==
The Russian 24-hour Championships was held on 10–11 May 2019 at the Iskra Stadium in Moscow as part of the XXVIII Super Day Marathon. A total of 53 athletes from 28 regions of Russia (37 men and 16 women) took to the start. For the first time in the history of the championships of Russia, all three women medalists showed results above 230 km, and four participants fulfilled the standard of an international-class master of sports (225 km). The winners were 24-hour run debutants Valery Dolzhikov (257,061 m) and Tatyana Fomina (233,380 m).

=== Men ===
Event	Gold		Silver		Bronze	
24-hour run	Valeriy Dolzhikov; Rostov Oblast	257061 m	Timur Ponomarev; Voronezh Oblast	250421 m	Artem Stonozhenko; Moscow Oblast	247433 m

=== Women ===
Event	Gold		Silver		Bronze	
24-hour run	Tatyana Fomina; Moscow Oblast	233380 m	Olga Veselkina; Kemerovo Oblast	231740 m	Valentina Mikhaylova; Vologda Oblast	231159 m

== Mountain Running (uphill and downhill) ==
The 21st Russian Mountain Running Championship (uphill and downhill) was held on 18 May in the village of Toksovo, Leningrad Oblast. Competitions were held at the sports base of the local Military Institute of Physical Culture, where a 1.7 km long lap with a height difference of 200 m. A total of 59 participants (34 men and 25 women) from 14 regions of Russia came to the start. Ruslan Khoroshilov became the first man to win the national titles in all three types of mountain running, having won the uphill race in 2015 and the long distance race in 2017.

=== Men ===
Event	Gold		Silver		Bronze	
Mountain running 12 km (+1400 m −1400 m)	Ruslan Khoroshilov; Belgorod Oblast	59:37	Andrey Alakhverdov; Stavropol Krai	1:01:19	Viktor Samoylov; Samara Oblast	1:02:17

=== Women ===
Event	Gold		Silver		Bronze	
Mountain running 6.9 km (+800 m −800 m)	Nadezhda Leonteva; Samara Oblast	42:10	Svetlana Timofeeva; Samara Oblast	42:33	Darya Panchenko; Saint Petersburg	42:45

== Combined Events ==
The Russian Combined Events Championships were determined on 14–16 June in Smolensk. The competition was attended by 39 athletes (28 men and 11 women) from 18 regions of the country. The championship was held at the stadium of the Smolensk Academy of Physical Culture.

=== Men ===
Event	Gold		Silver		Bronze	
Decathlon	Artem Lukyanenko; Moscow/Rostov Oblast	8064 pts	Sergey Timshin; Moscow/Lipetsk Oblast	7961 pts	Evgeniy Likhanov; Moscow/Krasnoyarsk Krai	7895 pts

=== Women ===
Event	Gold		Silver		Bronze	
Heptathlon	Mariya Pavlova; Tatarstan	6114 pts	Viktoriya Vaseykina; Moscow/Bryansk Oblast	6010 pts	Aleksandra Butvina; Rostov Oblast/Saint Petersburg	5910 pts

== Race Walking ==
The Russian Race Walking Championships was held on 15–16 June in Cheboksary along the city's promenade. A total of 65 athletes (39 men and 26 women) from 13 regions of the country took part in the competition. Claudia Afanasyeva defended her women's 50 km walk title in 3:57.08, which exceeded the world record of 3:59.15 by Liu Hong, but was not ratified due to Russia's international ban due to doping and the absence of foreign judges.

In February 2019, three of the four Russian walking champions (Shirobokov, Sharypov, Afanasyeva) received warnings from RUSADA for forbidden cooperation with the trainer Viktor Chegin, who was suspended for life in 2016 for numerous doping violations of his athletes. Another champion, Elena Lashmanova, trained for a long time under the guidance of Chegin, and from 2014 to 2016 she was suspended from the competition due to a positive doping test.

=== Men ===
Event	Gold		Silver		Bronze	
20 km walk	Sergey Shirobokov; Mordovia/Udmurtia	1:19:27	Roman Evstifeev; Mordovia	1:21:19	Aleksey Kudashkin; Mordovia	1:21:31
50 km walk	Sergey Sharypov; Mordovia/Udmurtia	3:43:36	Nikolay Sergeev; Moscow/Chuvashia	3:49:31	Aleksey Terentev; Moscow	3:58:13

=== Women ===
Event	Gold		Silver		Bronze	
20 km walk	Elena Lashmanova; Mordovia	1:27:19	Elvira Khasanova; Mordovia	1:28:15	Nadezhda Sergeeva; Moscow Oblast	1:30:54
50 km walk	Klavdiya Afanaseva; Mordovia/Chuvashia	3:57:08	Margarita Nikiforova; Mordovia/Kemerovo Oblast	4:05:58	Nadezhda Mokeeva; Moscow Oblast/Chuvashia	4:22:23

== Trail running ==
The inaugural Russian Trail Championships was held on 6 July in Karpinsk, Sverdlovsk Oblast, as part of the 24th Konzhak Mountain Marathon. In 2015, the IAAF officially recognized trail running as an athletics discipline and the Russian Ministry of Sports followed the body's lead with a national-level decision in 2017.

Participants overcame a 38.5 km long track laid along the slopes of Konzhakovsky Kamen Mountain. A total of 28 runners (20 men and 8 women) from 11 regions of the country were entered. Around 1,400 people entered the non-championship element of the race and the official championship winners were beaten by Yevgeny Markov (2:57.54), Antonina Yushina (3:35.13) and Anna Medvedeva (3:58.58), who had not been nominated by their region.

=== Men ===
Event	Gold		Silver		Bronze	
Trail running 38.5 km	Andrey Safronov; Bashkortostan	3:07:54	Aleksey Pagnuev; Sverdlovsk Oblast	3:09:00	Anatoliy Pechenkin; Perm Krai	3:30:08

=== Women ===
Event	Gold		Silver		Bronze	
Trail running 38.5 km	Zulfiya Gaynanova; Bashkortostan	4:00:16	Ekaterina Ryazanova; Krasnodar Krai	4:06:39	Ramilya Shagieva; Ulyanovsk Oblast	4:16:09

== Relay ==
The Russian Relay Championships was held from 8–9 September in Adlersky City District at the stadium of the Yunost sports complex.

=== Men ===
Event	Gold		Silver		Bronze	
100+200+400+800 m relay	Belgorod Oblast; Ivan Mamatov; Vsevolod Yakovlev; Andrey Chernyshov; Sergey Dubrovskiy	3:07.98	Voronezh Oblast; Ivan Trubnikov; Vladislav Doronin; Viktor Rozhenko; Rinat Shabaev	3:09.34	Moscow Oblast; Denis Zankin; Egor Filippov; Konstantin Zuev; Aleksey Butranov	3:10.15
4 × 800 m relay	Moscow Oblast; Egor Nikolaev; Konstantin Zuev; Egor Filippov; Aleksey Butranov	7:26.37	Ulyanovsk Oblast; Sergey Ermolov; Leonid Morozov; Sergey Khvatkov; Yaroslav Shmelev	7:27.99	Saint Petersburg; Vladislav Noskov; Valeriy Postnikov; Mikhail Bekyashev; Ivan Berezin	7:28.02
Shuttle hurdles relay	Saint Petersburg; Sergey Solodov; Andrey Gubanov; Oleg Spiridonov; German Shiryagin	58.43	Kemerovo Oblast; Andrey Khaylov; Aleksey Cherkasov; Konstantin Makhnev; Andrey Fomichev	59.19	Volgograd Oblast; Maksim Lobkov; Danil Nedrigaylo; Evgeniy Sarantsev; Ilya Shkurenev	1:00.64

=== Women ===
Event	Gold		Silver		Bronze	
100+200+400+800 m relay	Saint Petersburg; Valeriya Tsaplina; Vera Alymova; Ekaterina Tyurina; Ulyana Avvakumenkova	3:37.74	Voronezh Oblast; Alina Bozyukova; Irina Baulina; Olesya Bureeva; Svetlana Aplachkina	3:38.15	Kursk Oblast; Yuliya Petrishcheva; Anastasiya Rybkina; Elena Kotelnikova; Dina Aleksandrova	3:38.51
4 × 800 m relay	Saint Petersburg; Nadezhda Moseeva; Ekaterina Storozheva; Anzhelika Shevchenko; Anastasiya Kalina	8:31.76	Saint Petersburg; Darya Bolshakova; Polina Kondrashova; Olesya Kuzminchuk; Ulyana Avvakumenkova	8:36.10	Moscow Oblast; Darya Zimina; Aleksandra Pavlyutenkova; Elizaveta Tsyganova; Polina Zhukova	8:39.24
4 × 100 m relay	Saint Petersburg; Ekaterina Bleskina; Darya Shishkina; Valeriya Gromova; Irina Manakova	56.25	Novosibirsk Oblast; Aleksandra Grosheva; Viktoriya Pervushina; Ekaterina Tropina; Veronika Pechenkina	56.64	Voronezh Oblast; Irina Baulina; Alina Bozyukova; Anastasiya Vorobeva; Valeriya Rytikova	59.31

== Half marathon ==
The Russian Half Marathon Championships was held on 15 September in Yaroslavl as part of the VI Golden Ring Half Marathon. The race started and finished in Strelka Park and had a 10.55 km lon switchback course through the city. A total of 72 athletes from 32 regions of the country (38 men and 34 women) took to the start. Competitions were held in cool weather (about 12 degrees Celsius).

=== Men ===
Event	Gold		Silver		Bronze	
Half marathon	Artem Aplachkin; Moscow/Altai Krai	1:04:17	Oleg Grigorev; Moscow	1:04:25	Mikhail Strelkov; Moscow/Oryol Oblast	1:04:26

=== Women ===
Event	Gold		Silver		Bronze	
Half marathon	Elena Korobkina; Moscow/Lipetsk Oblast	1:10:27	Marina Kovaleva; Omsk Oblast	1:11:15	Elena Sedova; Moscow Oblast/Novosibirsk Oblast	1:12:37

== 100 km ==
The Russian 100 km Championships was held on 15 September in Bryansk as part of the Bryansk Forest Running Festival. Competitions took place in the Central Park of Culture and Rest on a kilometre-long circular circuit. Participants covered 100 laps in cool and clear weather (7 degrees Celsius at the start, 15 degrees at the finish); the second half of the distance was affected by a strong wind. A total of 22 athletes from 17 regions of the country (13 men and 9 women) took to the start.

=== Men ===
Event	Gold		Silver		Bronze	
100 km	Igor Veretennikov; Saint Petersburg	6:39:28	Vasiliy Larkin; Smolensk Oblast	6:45:49	Gennadiy Kanaev; Mordovia	6:56:38

=== Women ===
Event	Gold		Silver		Bronze	
100 km	Olga Veselkina; Kemerovo Oblast	7:49:13	Olga Ukolova; Samara Oblast	7:50:53	Nadezhda Shikhanova; Kirov Oblast	7:53:09

== Autumn Cross Country ==
The Russian Autumn Cross Country Championships was held from 12–13 October in Orenburg. Two senior races were attended by 59 runners from 24 regions of Russia (38 men and 21 women).

=== Men ===
Event	Gold		Silver		Bronze	
Cross country 10 km	Rinas Akhmadeev; Tatarstan	31:21	Andrey Minzhulin; Moscow/Sverdlovsk Oblast	31:37	Aleksey Vikulov; Novosibirsk Oblast/Zabaykalsky Krai	31:42

=== Women ===
Event	Gold		Silver		Bronze	
Cross country 6 km	Lyudmila Lebedeva; Moscow/Mari El	21:23	Anna Belokobylskaya; Novosibirsk Oblast	21:25	Anzhelika Moshkina; Samara Oblast	21:55

== Long-distance Mountain Running ==
The 13th Russian Long Distance Mountain Running Championship took place on 30 October in Krasnaya Polyana, Krasnodar Krai. A total of 25 participants (12 men and 13 women) from 10 regions of Russia entered the races.

=== Men ===
Event	Gold		Silver		Bronze	
Mountain running 30 km (+1311 m −1311 m)	Maksim Timofeev; Bashkortostan	2:04:50	Andrey Petrov; Bashkortostan	2:05:44	Oleg Kurkachev; Samara Oblast	2:07:36

=== Women ===
Event	Gold		Silver		Bronze	
Mountain running 30 km (+1311 m −1311 m)	Natalya Rudenko; Khakassia	2:31:57	Anastasiya Ursegova; Udmurtia	2:35:52	Aleksandra Zhavoronkova; Samara Oblast	2:36:13
