= 2019 Russian Indoor Athletics Championships =

- Edition: 28th
- Dates: 13–15 February
- Host city: Moscow
- Venue: Alexander Gomelsky Universal Sports Hall CSKA
- Events: 24

The 2019 Russian Indoor Athletics Championships was the 28th edition of the annual indoor track and field competition organised by the All-Russia Athletic Federation (ARAF), which serves as the Russian national indoor championship for the sport. A total of 24 events (divided evenly between the sexes) were contested over three days from 13 to 15 February at the Alexander Gomelsky Universal Sports Hall CSKA in Moscow.

Due to ongoing international sanctions for doping against the Russian governing body, the competition did not serve as a selection meet for the 2019 European Athletics Indoor Championships.

In addition to the main track and field championship, national championship events were held separately for the indoor mile on 3 February in Moscow, and for combined track and field events from 13 to 16 February in Kirov.

The women's high jump saw world-class performances from Mariya Lasitskene and Anna Chicherova, both of whom cleared 2.02 m (6 ft 7 1/2 in). Anzhelika Sidorova had her sixth consecutive win in the women's pole vault, while Vladimir Nikitin (3000 m) and Kristina Sivkova (60 m) each won their third national indoor titles.

== Results ==
=== Men ===
Event	Gold		Silver		Bronze	
60 metres	Rushan Abdulkaderov; Moscow	6.63	Igor Obraztsov; Ulyanovsk Oblast	6.64	Dmitriy Lopin; Krasnodar Krai/Samara Oblast	6.68
400 metres	Artem Araslanov; Moscow	47.11	Yaroslav Tkalich; Smolensk Oblast	47.14	Rudolf Verkhovykh; Sverdlovsk Oblast/Chelyabinsk Oblast	47.15
800 metres	Konstantin Kholmogorov; Moscow/Perm Krai	1:49.43	Sergey Dubrovskiy; Moscow Oblast/Belgorod Oblast	1:49.79	Nikolay Verbitskiy; Moscow Oblast/Buryatia	1:49.99
1500 metres	Konstantin Plokhotnikov; Krasnodar Krai	3:43.09	Ildar Nadyrov; Altai Krai	3:43.24	Evgeniy Kunts; Moscow/Altai Krai	3:43.46
3000 metres	Vladimir Nikitin; Moscow/Perm Krai	7:47.18	Yevgeny Rybakov; Kemerovo Oblast	7:52.31	Maksim Yakushev; Sverdlovsk Oblast	7:52.48
60 m hurdles	Konstantin Shabanov; Moscow/Pskov Oblast	7.62	Artem Makarenko; Moscow/Krasnoyarsk Krai	7.67	Filipp Shabanov; Moscow/Pskov Oblast	7.74
High jump	Mikhail Akimenko; Moscow/Kabardino-Balkaria	2.30 m	Ilya Ivanyuk; Bryansk Oblast/Smolensk Oblast	2.26 m	Daniil Tsyplakov; Krasnodar Krai/Khabarovsk Krai	2.26 m
Pole vault	Yevgeny Lukyanenko; Krasnodar Krai/Moscow	5.50 m	Georgiy Gorokhov; Moscow/Bryansk Oblast	5.50 m	Denis Akinshin; Moscow	5.45 m
Long jump	Aleksandr Menkov; Krasnoyarsk Krai/Mordovia	8.22 m	Anatoliy Ryapolov; Krasnodar Krai	7.90 m	Artem Primak; Krasnodar Krai/Khabarovsk Krai	7.76 m
Triple jump	Aleksandr Yurchenko; Moscow Oblast/Samara Oblast	16.84 m	Dmitry Sorokin; Krasnodar Krai	16.83 m	Aleksey Fyodorov; Moscow Oblast/Smolensk Oblast	16.48 m
Shot put	Maksim Afonin; Moscow/Moscow Oblast	20.70 m	Konstantin Lyadusov; Moscow/Rostov Oblast	19.88 m	Maksim Sidorov; Moscow Oblast	19.66 m
4 × 400 m relay	Saint Petersburg; Maksim Rafilovich; Andrey Rudenko; Konstantin Prokofev; Mikhail Filatov	3:10.85	Sverdlovsk Oblast; Anton Balykin; Evgeniy Prashcheruk; Artem Denmukhametov; Rudolf Verkhovykh	3:10.87	Moscow; Dmitriy Efimov; Artem Araslanov; Anton Novikov; Andrey Efremov	3:13.13

=== Women ===
Event	Gold		Silver		Bronze	
60 metres	Kristina Sivkova; Moscow	7.15	Anastasiya Grigoreva; Saint Petersburg	7.29	Natalya Pogrebnyak; Krasnodar Krai	7.32
400 metres	Antonina Krivoshapka; Moscow/Volgograd Oblast	51.97	Ekaterina Renzhina; Moscow/Tula Oblast	52.67	Ayvika Malanova; Saint Petersburg/Moscow	53.87
800 metres	Ekaterina Zavyalova; Moscow/Mordovia	2:00.59	Aleksandra Gulyaeva; Moscow/Ivanovo Oblast	2:00.86	Svetlana Uloga; Tatarstan	2:01.83
1500 metres	Anastasiya Kalina; Moscow Oblast/Saint Petersburg	4:12.94	Dina Aleksandrova; Kursk Oblast	4:14.51	Ekaterina Ivonina; Moscow Oblast/Perm Krai	4:14.86
3000 metres	Svetlana Aplachkina; Voronezh Oblast	8:54.06	Ekaterina Ishova; Moscow Oblast/Chuvashia	9:04.08	Ulyana Avvakumenkova; Saint Petersburg	9:08.65
60 m hurdles	Mariya Aglitskaya; Moscow	8.14	Anastasiya Nikolaeva; Moscow Oblast/Samara Oblast	8.20	Veronika Chervinskaya; Krasnodar Krai	8.25
High jump	Mariya Lasitskene; Moscow Oblast/Kabardino-Balkaria	2.02 m	Anna Chicherova; Moscow/Rostov Oblast	2.02 m	Aleksandra Yaryshkina; Moscow	1.92 m
Pole vault	Anzhelika Sidorova; Moscow/Chuvashia	4.80 m	Olga Mullina; Moscow	4.50 m	Irina Ivanova; Omsk Oblast	4.50 m
Long jump	Yelena Sokolova; Moscow/Belgorod Oblast	6.63 m	Polina Lukyanenkova; Krasnodar Krai	6.43 m	Ekaterina Kropivko; Moscow/Stavropol Krai	6.42 m
Triple jump	Ekaterina Koneva; Krasnodar Krai/Khabarovsk Krai	14.51 m	Darya Nidbaykina; Moscow/Bryansk Oblast	13.87 m	Valentina Kosolapova; Volgograd Oblast/Moscow	13.32 m
Shot put	Alena Gordeeva; Moscow/Tver Oblast	18.20 m	Anna Avdeyeva; Samara Oblast	17.74 m	Evgeniya Soloveva; Moscow Oblast/Chelyabinsk Oblast	17.05 m
4 × 400 m relay	Saint Petersburg; Vera Alymova; Lyubov Semenova; Elena Chernyaeva; Ayvika Malanova	3:36.98	Sverdolovsk Oblast; Irina Takuntseva; Natalya Sevryugina; Anastasiya Zhdanova; Kseniya Aksenova	3:37.33	Moscow; Anna Popova; Anastasiya Bulakhova; Santa Tkhakur; Irina Kolesnichenko	3:38.61

== Russian Indoor Mile Championships ==
The Russian Indoor Mile Championships was held on 3 February 2019 in Moscow at the Alexander Gomelsky Universal Sports Hall CSKA. A total of 34 athletes from 16 regions of the country (20 men and 14 women) took to the start. Vladimir Nikitin set a new Russian indoor record of 3:54.77 minutes to win the men's race while runner-up Konstantin Plokhotnikov set a national youth record of 3:58.62 minutes. Svetlana Aplachkina won the women's race in 4:31.51 minutes.

=== Men ===
Event	Gold		Silver		Bronze	
Mile run	Vladimir Nikitin; Moscow/Perm Krai	3:54.77	Konstantin Plokhotnikov; Krasnodar Krai	3:58.62	Valentin Smirnov; Saint Petersburg/Chelyabinsk Oblast	3:59.38

=== Women ===
Event	Gold		Silver		Bronze	
Mile run	Svetlana Aplachkina; Voronezh Oblast	4:31.51	Ekaterina Storozheva; Moscow Oblast/Saint Petersburg	4:31.69	Anastasiya Kalina; Moscow Oblast/Saint Petersburg	4:31.78

== Russian Combined Events Championships ==
The Russian Combined Events Championships were held from 13 to 16 February at the Veresniki Stadium in Kirov, Kirov Oblast. The leading men's athletes, Ilya Shkurenyov and Artyom Makarenko were both absent. Andrei Fomichev won his first title in the heptathlon, though his score of 5556 points was the lowest winning score in championship history. Maria Pavlova won her second national indoor title in the pentathlon.

=== Men ===
Event	Gold		Silver		Bronze	
Heptathlon	Andrey Fomichev; Kemerovo Oblast	5556 pts	Andrey Levkovskiy; Kemerovo Oblast	5513 pts	Sergey Timshin; Moscow/Lipetsk Oblast	5473 pts

=== Women ===
Event	Gold		Silver		Bronze	
Pentathlon	Maria Pavlova; Tatarstan	4332 pts	Aleksandra Butvina; Rostov Oblast/Saint Petersburg	4250 pts	Viktoriya Vaseykina; Moscow/Bryansk Oblast	4202 pts
