= 2018 Russian Athletics Championships =

Athletic competition

- Dates: 19–22 July
- Host city: Kazan
- Venue: Central Stadium
- Events: 38
- Participation: around 1000 athletes

The 2018 Russian Athletics Championships was held July 19–22 at Central Stadium in Kazan. The capital of Tatarstan hosted the event for the third time, having done so previously in 2008 and 2014. Around 1000 athletes from 76 regions of the country participated in the competition. Over the course of four days, 38 events were contested.

For the third year in a row, the national championships did not include the selection of an international team (on this occasion, for the 2018 European Athletics Championships). This was due to the continuation Russia's ban from international athletics by the IAAF due to doping, which began in 2015. Three Russians, who competed at that competition as Authorised Neutral Athletes (Sergey Shubenkov, Anzhelika Sidorova and Danil Lysenko), chose not to compete at the national event, instead competing at the Herculis 2018 IAAF Diamond League meeting.

Vladimir Nikitin won the men's 1500 metres in a championship record of 3:35.85. After the collapse of the USSR, only two people showed faster results at this distance: the country's record holder Vyacheslav Shabunin and Andrei Loginov. Aleksandr Lesnoy improved his personal record to 21.58 m, bringing him to fourth among Russia's all-time men's shot putters.

The 2012 Olympic champion Anna Chicherova returned from her doping ban but was beaten into second place by world-leader Mariya Lasitskene.

Ekaterina Ivonina set a European-leading time of 9:16.68 to win the 3000 metres steeplechase. She led from start to finish and beat the silver medalist by 22 seconds.

Several athletes extended their list of national honours: Dmitry Tarabin won the javelin for the sixth time in a row, while hurdler Konstantin Shabanov became a six-time champion in the 110 metres hurdles.

== Championships ==
During 2018, Russian championships were held in various cities in individual athletics disciplines:

- 31 March — Russian Championships in mountain running (uphill) (Zheleznovodsk)
- 28 April — Russian Championships in cross country running (spring) (Zhukovskiy)
- 30 April — Russian Championships in marathon (Volgograd)
- 6 May — Russian Championships in mountain running (uphill-downhill) (Rybinsk)
- 12—13 May — Russian Championships in 24-hour run (Moscow)
- 30—31 May — Russian Championships in relay (Smolensk)
- 9—10 June — Russian Championships in racewalking (Cheboksary)
- 30 June — Russian Championships in 10,000 metres (Zhukovskiy)
- 4—5 July — Russian Championships in combined track and field events (Smolensk)
- 2 September — Russian Championships in half marathon (Yaroslavl)
- 9 September — Russian Championships in 15K run (Saransk)
- 9 September — Russian Championships in 100 kilometres (Saint Petersburg)
- 20—21 October — Russian Championships in cross country running (autumn) (Orenburg)
- 28 October — Russian Championships in mountain running (long-distance) (Krasnaya Polyana)

== Results ==
=== Men ===
Event	Gold		Silver		Bronze	
100 metres	Denis Ogarkov; Lipetsk Oblast; Bryansk Oblast	10.32	Ruslan Perestyuk; Krasnodar Krai	10.33	Dmitriy Lopin; Krasnodar Krai	10.34
200 metres	Aleksandr Efimov; Tula Oblast	20.81	Ruslan Perestyuk; Krasnodar Krai	20.82	Denis Ogarkov; Lipetsk Oblast; Bryansk Oblast	20.95
400 metres	Mikhail Filatov; Saint Petersburg	46.00	Maksim Fedyaev; Kursk Oblast	46.01	Denis Kudryavtsev; Tyumen Oblast	46.28
800 metres	Sergey Dubrovskiy; Moscow Oblast; Belgorod Oblast	1:46.79	Konstantin Kholmogorov; Moscow; Perm Krai	1:48.01	Aleksey Butranov; Moscow Oblast	1:48.32
1500 metres	Vladimir Nikitin; Moscow; Perm Krai	3:35.85	Sergey Dubrovskiy; Moscow Oblast; Belgorod Oblast	3:40.18	Valentin Smirnov; Saint Petersburg; Chelyabinsk Oblast	3:41.35
5000 metres	Evgeniy Rybakov; Kemerovo Oblast	13:23.57	Anatoliy Rybakov; Kemerovo Oblast	13:26.25	Artem Leonenko; Tambov Oblast	13:27.61
3000 m s'chase	Maksim Yakushev; Sverdlovsk Oblast	8:22.40	Ildar Nadyrov; Altai Krai	8:28.70	Yuriy Kloptsov; Moscow; Altai Krai	8:29.42
110 m hurdles	Konstantin Shabanov; Moscow; Pskov Oblast	13.53	Filipp Shabanov; Moscow; Pskov Oblast	13.88	Sergey Solodov; Saint Petersburg	13.88
400 m hurdles	Timofey Chalyy; Krasnoyarsk Krai; Moscow Oblast	49.52	Aleksandr Skorobogatko; Tyumen Oblast	49.99	Nikita Andriyanov; Moscow Oblast; Novosibirsk Oblast	50.78
High jump	Ivan Ukhov; Moscow	2.32 m	Ilya Ivanyuk; Bryansk Oblast; Smolensk Oblast	2.28 m	Semen Pozdnyakov; Moscow; Bryansk Oblast	2.26 m
Pole vault	Evgeniy Lukyanenko; Krasnodar Krai; Moscow	5.65 m	Georgiy Gorokhov; Moscow; Bryansk Oblast	5.55 m	Aleksandr Gripich; Krasnodar Krai; Moscow	5.55 m
Long jump	Aleksandr Menkov; Krasnoyarsk Krai; Mordovia	8.03 m (+1.2 m/s)	Pavel Shalin; Moscow; Lipetsk Oblast	7.97 m (+1.4 m/s)	Denis Bogdanov; Moscow; Volgograd Oblast	7.81 m (+0.9 m/s)
Triple jump	Aleksandr Yurchenko; Samara Oblast	16.98 m (+0.4 m/s)	Aleksey Fyodorov; Moscow Oblast; Smolensk Oblast	16.76 m (+1.4 m/s)	Dmitriy Sorokin; Krasnodar Krai	16.76 m (+1.4 m/s)
Shot put	Aleksandr Lesnoy; Krasnodar Krai; Nizhny Novgorod Oblast	21.58 m	Maksim Afonin; Moscow; Sakha−Sakha Republic	20.44 m	Konstantin Lyadusov; Moscow; Rostov Oblast	20.04 m
Discus throw	Aleksey Khudyakov; Moscow	64.37 m	Viktor Butenko; Moscow; Stavropol Krai	62.74 m	Nikolay Sedyuk; Moscow; Nizhny Novgorod Oblast	61.15 m
Hammer throw	Denis Lukyanov; Moscow Oblast; Rostov Oblast	74.74 m	Aleksey Sokirskiy; Krasnodar Krai	74.61 m	Sergey Litvinov; Mordovia	74.60 m
Javelin throw	Dmitriy Tarabin; Krasnodar Krai; Moscow Oblast	82.89 m	Andrey Doroshev; Southern Federal District/Republic of Crimea	75.99 m	Vladislav Panasenkov; Moscow Oblast; Smolensk Oblast	75.29 m
4 × 100 m relay	Krasnodar Krai; Dmitriy Khomutov; Dmitriy Lopin; Ruslan Perestyuk; Ruslan Kislykh	39.73	Ulyanovsk Oblast; Pavel Knyazev; Igor Obraztsov; Andrey Galatskov; Ilfat Sadeev	39.81	Saint Petersburg; Dmitriy Shkuropatov; Konstantin Petryashov; Kirill Chernukhin; Artur Reysbikh	39.84
4 × 400 m relay	Saint Petersburg; Maksim Rafilovich; Andrey Rudenko; Andrey Kukharenko; Mikhail Filatov	3:04.88	Tyumen Oblast; Pavel Trenikhin; Aleksandr Skorobogatko; Pavel Savin; Denis Kudryavtsev	3:05.43	Irkutsk Oblast; Ilya Krasnov; Vladimir Krasnov; Edgar Repin; Vadim Rezvykh	3:09.67

=== Women ===
Event	Gold		Silver		Bronze	
100 metres	Kristina Sivkova; Moscow	11.30	Kristina Khorosheva; Penza Oblast; Tula Oblast	11.42	Elena Chernyaeva; Saint Petersburg; Vologda Oblast	11.51
200 metres	Kristina Khorosheva; Penza Oblast; Tula Oblast	23.17	Anastasiya Polischuk; Sverdlovsk Oblast; Chelyabinsk Oblast	23.41	Elena Chernyaeva; Saint Petersburg; Vologda Oblast	23.53
400 metres	Polina Miller; Krasnodar Krai; Altai Krai	51.82	Ekaterina Renzhina; Moscow; Tula Oblast	52.14	Kseniya Aksenova; Sverdlovsk Oblast; Yamalo-Nenets Autonomous Okrug	52.46
800 metres	Ekaterina Zavyalova; Moscow; Mordovia	2:00.80	Anzhelika Shevchenko; Saint Petersburg	2:01.60	Marina Pospelova; Moscow; Yaroslavl Oblast	2:01.72
1500 metres	Aleksandra Gulyaeva; Moscow; Ivanovo Oblast	4:05.00	Elena Korobkina; Moscow; Lipetsk Oblast	4:07.45	Inessa Gusarova; Belgorod Oblast; Bryansk Oblast	4:07.87
5000 metres	Elena Korobkina; Moscow; Lipetsk Oblast	15:19.11	Ekaterina Ishova; Moscow Oblast; Chuvashia	15:24.09	Elena Sedova; Moscow Oblast; Novosibirsk Oblast	15:26.64
3000 m s'chase	Ekaterina Ivonina; Moscow Oblast; Perm Krai	9:16.68	Natalya Koloskova; Moscow; Primorsky Krai	9:39.07	Natalya Leonteva; Moscow; Sakha−Sakha Republic	9:50.19
100 m hurdles	Ekaterina Galitskaya; Rostov Oblast; Saint Petersburg	13.21	Veronika Chervinskaya; Krasnodar Krai; Sverdlovsk Oblast	13.21	Ekaterina Bleskina; Krasnoyarsk Krai; Saint Petersburg	13.40
400 m hurdles	Vera Rudakova; Moscow; Perm Krai	56.03	Valeriya Khramova; Moscow Oblast; Samara Oblast	56.04	Irina Kolesnichenko; Moscow; Moscow Oblast	57.26
High jump	Mariya Lasitskene; Moscow Oblast; Kabardino-Balkaria	2.00 m	Anna Chicherova; Moscow	1.90 m	Tatyana Odineva; Moscow	1.90 m
Pole vault	Olga Mullina; Moscow	4.65 m	Aksana Gataullina; Moscow	4.55 m	Angelina Krasnova; Moscow; Irkutsk Oblast	4.45 m
Long jump	Elena Sokolova; Moscow; Belgorod Oblast	6.68 m (+0.6 m/s)	Ekaterina Khalyutina; Moscow	6.45 m (+2.1 m/s)	Ekaterina Kropivko; Moscow; Stavropol Krai	6.41 m (+2.2 m/s)
Triple jump	Ekaterina Koneva; Krasnodar Krai; Khabarovsk Krai	14.79 m (+2.3 m/s)	Darya Nidbaykina; Moscow; Bryansk Oblast	14.13 m (+1.7 m/s)	Natalya Yevdokimova; Tatarstan	13.92 m (+1.0 m/s)
Shot put	Alena Bugakova; Moscow; Tver Oblast	18.02 m	Anna Avdeeva; Samara Oblast	17.78 m	Irina Tarasova; Moscow; Rostov Oblast	17.66 m
Discus throw	Yelena Panova; Moscow; Vladimir Oblast	59.17 m	Ekaterina Strokova; Moscow; Nizhny Novgorod Oblast	58.50 m	Yuliya Maltseva; Moscow; Khanty-Mansiysk Autonomous Okrug	56.37 m
Hammer throw	Elizaveta Tsareva; Moscow Oblast; Rostov Oblast	70.72 m	Sofya Palkina; Samara Oblast	67.68 m	Natalya Pospelova; Sverdlovsk Oblast; Stavropol Krai	63.28 m ^{[a]}
Javelin throw	Ekaterina Starygina; Moscow Oblast; Rostov Oblast	60.02 m	Mariya Safonova; Voronezh Oblast	55.02 m	Kseniya Zybina; Saint Petersburg	53.71 m
4 × 100 m relay	Saint Petersburg; Ekaterina Galitskaya; Elena Chernyaeva; Ekaterina Bleskina; Anastasiya Grigoreva	44.93	Krasnodar Krai; Anastasiya Malysheva; Nina Morozova; Olga Tkachenko; Polina Miller	45.38	Penza Oblast; Valeriya Muromskaya; Kristina Khorosheva; Tatyana Mironova; Irina Nikitina	45.62
4 × 400 m relay	Moscow; Elizaveta Anikienko; Nadezhda Kotlyarova; Aleksandra Luzina; Yuliya Kuznetsova	3:34.18	Moscow Oblast; Mariya Tarabanskaya; Valeriya Khramova; Yuliya Spiridonova; Alena Mamina	3:34.61	Perm Krai; Mariya Mikhaylyuk; Vera Rudakova; Liliya Gabdullina; Elena Zuykevich	3:34.94

^{a} On October 25, 2018, the All-Russian Federation of Athletics announced a 4-year disqualification of the hammer thrower Natalia Polyakova for 4 years. Methenolone was detected in her doping test at this event. The result of the athlete in this tournament (3rd place, 66.54 m) was annulled in accordance with the rules.

== Mountain running (uphill) ==
The 19th Russian Mountain Running Championship (uphill) took place on March 31, 2018 in Zheleznovodsk, Stavropol Territory. The race circuit was on the slopes of Mount Beshtau. A total of 82 participants (51 men and 31 women) from 25 regions of Russia started the race. Alexey Pagnuev repeated last year's success, winning the men's race. Since 2011, for the sixth time, Alexei was in the top three of the country's uphill mountain running championship. Galina Egorova became the national champion of Russia for the seventh time in her career. She won previous victories in the indoor 5000 metres (2007), mountain (up and down) (2010, 2011, 2017) and the uphill mountain race (2012, 2013). For the third year in a row, Anastasia Rudnaya, the world champion in orienteering, climbed the podium in the women's event. After two bronze medals, she won the silver medal, only 16 seconds behind the winner.

=== Men ===
Event	Gold		Silver		Bronze	
11.88 km Height difference:+1098 m −142 m	Aleksey Pagnuev; Sverdlovsk Oblast	56:57	Andrey Safronov; Bashkortostan	57:43	Andrey Shklyaev; Udmurtia	57:56

=== Women ===
Event	Gold		Silver		Bronze	
7.1 km Height difference:+888 m −102 m	Galina Egorova; Samara Oblast	49:38	Anastasiya Rudnaya; Saint Petersburg	49:54	Anastasiya Kozina; Samara Oblast	50:10

== Cross country (spring) ==
The 2018 Russian Spring Cross Country Championships were held on 28 April in Zhukovskiy, Moscow Oblast. A total of 73 runners (34 men and 39 women) from 33 regions of Russia took part in four senior races.

=== Men ===
Event	Gold		Silver		Bronze	
4 km	Aleksey Popov; Voronezh Oblast	11:19	Ildar Nadyrov; Altai Krai	11:20	Ivan Panferov; Moscow; Oryol Oblast	11:21
8 km	Aleksey Vikulov; Novosibirsk Oblast; Zabaykalsky Krai	23:22	Andrey Leyman; Krasnodar Krai	23:23	Mikhail Strelkov; Moscow; Oryol Oblast	23:24

=== Women ===
Event	Gold		Silver		Bronze	
2 km	Marina Pospelova; Moscow; Yaroslavl Oblast	5:58	Anastasiya Kalina; Moscow Oblast; Saint Petersburg	6:00	Natalya Aristarkhova; Krasnoyarsk Krai	6:03
5 km	Aleksandra Gulyaeva; Moscow; Ivanovo Oblast	16:04	Ekaterina Sokolenko; Tomsk Oblast; Novosibirsk Oblast	16:10	Alla Kulyatina; Novosibirsk Oblast	16:12

== Marathon ==
The 2018 Russian Marathon Championships was held on 30 April in Volgograd, incorporated into the city's annual marathon.

=== Men ===
Event	Gold		Silver		Bronze	
Marathon	Aleksey Reunkov; Moscow; Chelyabinsk Oblast	2:12:20	Stepan Kiselev; Tatarstan	2:13:17	Mikhail Maksimov; Saint Petersburg	2:14:30

=== Women ===
Event	Gold		Silver		Bronze	
Marathon	Sardana Trofimova; Sakha-Sakha Republic	2:28:55	Alina Prokopeva; Moscow Oblast; Chuvashia	2:30:24	Natalya Tikhonova; Chelyabinsk Oblast	2:30:40

== Mountain running (uphill-downhill) ==
The 2018 Russian Mountain Running Championships (uphill-downhill) was the 20th edition of the competition. It was held on 6 May 2018 in Rybinsk, Yaroslavl Oblast. A total of 48 runners (33 men and 15 women) from 17 regions started the championships.

=== Men ===
Event	Gold		Silver		Bronze	
12 km Height difference:+816 m −816 m	Konstantin Galiullin; Moscow	55.34	Anton Tingaev; Samara Oblast	56.09	Aleksandr Terentev; Yaroslavl Oblast	56.47

=== Women ===
Event	Gold		Silver		Bronze	
8 km Height difference:+544 m −544 m	Ekaterina Mulenko; Samara Oblast	42.53	Nadezhda Leonteva; Samara Oblast	45.50	Irina Pankovskaya; Yaroslavl Oblast	46.12

== 24-hour run ==
The Russian 24-hour Championship was held on May 12–13 at the Iskra Stadium in Moscow as part of the XXVII Super Day marathon. A total of 55 athletes (40 men and 15 women) from 19 regions of Russia took the start. Nadezhda Gubareva became the youngest winner of the championship: at the time of the finish she was 22 years 240 days. The men's champion, Konstantin Chekulov, won the national championship for the first time in his career. A 60-year-old Yuriy Galkin, after two wins in 2016 and 2017, appeared on the podium for a third time. For the third year in a row, the silver medal in the women's race was won by Nadezhda Shikhanova, and the bronze medal by Anna Sidorova.

=== Men ===
Event	Gold		Silver		Bronze	
24-hour run	Konstantin Chekulov; Moscow Oblast	241,214 m	Igor Malygin; Nizhny Novgorod Oblast	234,371 m	Yuriy Galkin; Moscow Oblast	231,188 m

=== Women ===
Event	Gold		Silver		Bronze	
24-hour run	Nadezhda Gubareva; Krasnodar Krai; Karachay-Cherkessiaya	229,981 m	Nadezhda Shikhanova; Kirov Oblast	228,389 m	Anna Sidorova; Saint Petersburg	214,789 m

== Relay ==
The Russian Relay Championships was held in Smolensk on May 30–31 at the stadium of the Smolensk Academy of Physical Culture. Competitions were held simultaneously with the Russian Team Athletics Championship.

=== Men ===
Event	Gold		Silver		Bronze	
100+200+400+800 m relay	Belgorod Oblast; Vage Setrakyan; Vsevolod Yakovlev; Roman Semakin; Sergey Dubrovskiy	3:09.74	Saint Petersburg; Gleb Baluev; Kirill Chernukhin; Daniil Lukakhin; Pavel Khvorostukhin	3:11.08	Ulyanovsk Oblast; Aleksey Yufimov; Ilfat Sadeev; Andrey Galatskov; Sergey Khvatkov	3:12.96
4 × 800 m relay	Moscow Oblast; Egor Filippov; Egor Nikolaev; Nikolay Verbitskiy; Aleksey Butranov	7:31.93	Saint Petersburg; Aleksandr Kuverin; Mikhail Smirnov; Ivan Berezin; Valentin Smirnov	7:32.37	Udmurtia; Vitaliy Khmelev; Anton Gluschenko; Grigoriy Prokopev; Sergey Alabuzhev	7:44.69
4 × 1500 m relay	Saint Petersburg; Boris Zakharov; Vladimir Leshonkov; Timofey Petrov; Aleksey Kharitonov	15:45.70	Moscow; Nikita Kalganov; Dmitriy Nedelin; Konstantin Galiullin; Vyacheslav Sokolov	15:47.04	Bashkortostan; Zakir Gadelshin; Ilnaz Minigaleev; Vildan Gadelshin; Danil Strelnikov	16:09.55
Shuttle hurdles relay	Kemerovo Oblast; Andrey Khaylov; Evgeniy Vlasov; Andrey Fomichev; Aleksey Cherkasov	59.42	Moscow Oblast; Nikolay Safronov; Aleksandr Rudchenko; Maksim Fedoseev; Devid Vardanyan	1:02.26	Only two teams finished	

=== Women ===
Event	Gold		Silver		Bronze	
100+200+400+800 m relay	Ulyanovsk Oblast; Ekaterina Vysotskaya; Tatyana Zotova; Ekaterina Panasenko; Natalya Peryakova	3:37.82	Kursk Oblast; Kseniya Borisenko; Sofya Borodina; Elena Kotelnikova; Ekaterina Shmygareva	3:40.81	Saint Petersburg; Elena Chernyaeva; Ekaterina Koprova; Valeriya Tsaplina; Alena Melnikova	3:41.92
4 × 800 m relay	Saint Petersburg; Anzhelika Shevchenko; Nadezhda Moseeva; Kseniya Savina; Ekaterina Storozheva	8:46.75	Moscow Oblast; Elizaveta Tsyganova; Anna Boynova; Ekaterina Sokolova; Olesya Muratova	9:00.03	Voronezh Oblast; Kristina Raspopova; Anastasiya Kuznetsova; Violetta Starodubova; Ekaterina Chupakhina	10:15.59
4 × 1500 m relay	Saint Petersburg; Darya Bolshakova; Anna Petrova; Ulyana Avvakumenkova; Anastasiya Kalina	17:57.21	Moscow; Aleksandra Tsokh; Elizaveta Yuminova; Ekaterina Samuylova; Anastasiya Nemykina	18:57.39	ne vruchalas' ^{[b]}	
4 × 100 m relay	Saint Petersburg; Mariya Aglitskaya; Irina Reshetkina; Ekaterina Bleskina; Ekaterina Galitskaya	55.27	Moscow Oblast; Elena Timakova; Elizaveta Kozeeva; Irina Boldyreva; Elizaveta Ivanova	59.51	Volgograd Oblast; Evgeniya Zinchenko; Svetlana Tkachenko; Olga Fomina; Valeriya Frolova	1:01.44

^{b} V estafete 4×1500 metrov u zhenschin uchastvovali tolko 2 komandy.

== Racewalking ==
The 2018 Russian Race Walking Championships was held June 9–10 in Cheboksary. The route was laid along the embankment of the Cheboksary Bay. The competition was attended by 59 athletes (33 men and 26 women) from 9 regions of the country. For the first time, a women's 50 km race took place at the Russian Championship, following the IAAF's international recognition of the event in 2016. The first champion and record holder of Russia was Klavdiya Afanasyeva.

The 19-year-old Sergey Shirobokov claimed the men's title over 20 km: his result (1:17:25) made him the fourth fastest ever in Russia and the ninth in the world among adults. Elena Lashmanova exceeded the 20 km world record time by almost a minute, 1:23:39 versus 1:24:38. Her time was a new national record, but was not ratified by the IAAF as a global one due to the disqualification of the national federation due to the doping scandal and, as a result, the lack of international judges at the race.

=== Men ===
Event	Gold		Silver		Bronze	
20 km walk	Sergey Shirobokov; Mordovia; Udmurtia	1:17:25	Roman Evstifeev; Mordovia	1:20:55	Kirill Frolov; Moscow; Chuvashia	1:21:28
50 km walk	Sergey Bakulin; Mordovia	3:42:20	Dementiy Cheparev; Mordovia	3:54:20	Aleksey Terentev; Moscow	3:59:14

=== Women ===
Event	Gold		Silver		Bronze	
20 km walk	Elena Lashmanova; Mordovia	1:23:39	Sofiya Brodatskaya; Mordovia	1:27:42	Reykhan Kagramanova; Mordovia; Kemerovo Oblast	1:29:50
50 km walk	Klavdiya Afanasyeva; Mordovia; Chuvashia	4:14:46	Aleksandra Bushkova; Mordovia; Udmurtia	4:22:36	Olga Shargina; Mordovia; Chelyabinsk Oblast	4:27:13

== 10,000 metres ==
The 2018 Russian Championships in the 10,000 metres was held on June 30 as part of the Znamensky Brothers Memorial. Competitions were held at Meteor Stadium in the suburban town of Zhukovsky, Moscow Oblast. The races took place in the evening in warm and windless weather. A total of 44 athletes (29 men and 15 women) from 29 regions of the country started the championships. Elena Sedova defended the title of champion of the country, leading from the start. In the men's race, Vladimir Nikitin won his first national title.

=== Men ===
Event	Gold		Silver		Bronze	
10,000 metres	Vladimir Nikitin; Moscow; Perm Krai	28:16.43	Evgeniy Rybakov; Kemerovo Oblast	28:29.52	Rinas Akhmadeev; Tatarstan	28:33.40

=== Women ===
Event	Gold		Silver		Bronze	
10,000 metres	Elena Sedova; Moscow Oblast; Novosibirsk Oblast	32:45.94	Lyudmila Lebedeva; Moscow; Mari El	32:57.11	Svetlana Simakova; Moscow	33:01.25

== Combined events ==
The 2018 Russian Combined Events Championships was held on July 4–5 in Smolensk. The competition was attended by 51 athletes (28 men and 23 women) from 18 regions of the country. Competitions were held at the stadium of the Smolensk Academy of Physical Culture. Artyom Makarenko and Victoria Vaseykina won the outdoor national championship for the first time in their career. Vaseykina's victory was secured by 5743 points - the lowest winning score among for the heptathlon championship since 1992.

=== Men ===
Event	Gold		Silver		Bronze	
Decathlon	Artem Makarenko; Moscow; Krasnoyarsk Krai	7925pts	Artem Lukyanenko; Moscow; Rostov Oblast	7813pts	Evgeniy Likhanov; Moscow; Krasnoyarsk Krai	7708pts

=== Women ===
Event	Gold		Silver		Bronze	
Heptathlon	Viktoriya Vaseykina; Moscow; Bryansk Oblast	5743pts	Aleksandra Butvina; Rostov Oblast; Saint Petersburg	5719pts	Mariya Pavlova; Tatarstan	5692pts

== Half marathon ==
The 2018 Russian Half Marathon Championships was held on 2 September in Yaroslavl as part of the Yaroslavl Half Marathon. The circuit was a circular 10.55 km route set in the historic part of the city. A total of 47 athletes (29 men and 18 women) from 24 regions of the country took the start.

Competitions were held in warm and sunny weather. In the women's run, Irina Sergeeva took the lead from the start. Tatyana Arkhipova overtook her on the second lap of the course and won by a margin of twelve seconds. In the men's race, the top three contenders for the medals were determined after the 15th kilometer. Artem Aplachkin, who won the Russian title for the second time in his career, was the fastest in the final segment.

=== Men ===
Event	Gold		Silver		Bronze	
Half marathon	Artem Aplachkin; Altai Krai; Moscow	1:04:45	Nikolay Chavkin; Moscow	1:05:16	Aleksandr Imenin; Ryazan Oblast	1:05:29

=== Women ===
Event	Gold		Silver		Bronze	
Half marathon	Tatyana Arkhipova; Moscow Oblast; Chuvashia	1:11:23	Irina Sergeeva; Kursk Oblast	1:11:35	Mariya Osokina; Perm Krai	1:13:34

== 15K ==
The 2018 Russian 15K Championships were held on 9 September in Saransk as part of the 46th run in the memory of Peter Bolotnikov. A total of 49 athletes (31 men and 18 women) from 12 regions of the country entered the competition. 31-year-old Ilya Zmaznev for the first time in his career became national champion. Elena Nagovitsyna won the women's race, following a fourth place finish at the half marathon championship a week earlier.

=== Men ===
Event	Gold		Silver		Bronze	
15 km	Ilya Zmaznev; Khakassia	47.57	Anton Tingaev; Samara Oblast	49.14	Viktor Samoylov; Samara Oblast	49.25

=== Women ===
Event	Gold		Silver		Bronze	
15 km	Elena Nagovitsyna; Udmurtia; Chuvashia	52.51	Kseniya Makhneva; Chuvashia	53.19	Gulnara Vygovskaya; Samara Oblast	54.55

== 100 km ==
The 2018 Russian 100 km Championships was held on 9 September in Saint Petersburg. The competition took place on Krestovsky Island on a circular track 2.5 km long under comfortable weather conditions (cloudy, up to +20 degrees). A total of 33 athletes (21 men and 12 women) from 20 regions of the country took the start.

The main surprise of the men's race was the withdrawal of the current champion and record holder of Russia Vasily Larkin. From the start, he stepped forward along with Vsevolod Khudyakov, after the 30th kilometer he made a successful break-away attempt and at some point had an almost minute advantage. However, after the middle of the distance, the gap began to decrease: by 60 km, the leaders again caught up, and after the 75th km, Larkin stopped running altogether. After the main competitor had vanished, Khudyakov was 17 minutes ahead of the nearest pursuer, which was more than enough to maintain the first position and win the Russian championship in the 100 km run for the third time in his career.

Several favorites stopped the fight in the course of the race and in the women's race. The current champion of the country Alsou Asanova came down after 57 km, the world champion Marina Zhalybina ran a little more than 30 km. In the middle of the race, the leader was Olga Ukolova, the bronze medalist of the previous year's championship. At the beginning of the second half, she was ahead of Nadezhda Gogoleva and Dina Zakharchenko, who led the fight for the victory to the finish. At certain moments, Gogoleva's advantage reached almost two minutes, but by 85 km only 10 seconds remained. Zakharchenko closely approached the leader, but she did not have the strength for the final segment. Nadezhda Gogoleva became the champion of Russia for the second time in her career, Dina Zakharchenko won the silver medal, losing by less than a minute. For the second year in a row, Nadezhda Shikhanova reached the national podium in both supermarathon disciplines, 24 hours and 100 km.

=== Men ===
Event	Gold		Silver		Bronze	
100 km	Vsevolod Khudyakov; Voronezh Oblast	6:47.47	Igor Veretennikov; Saint Petersburg	7:00.58	Vitaliy Verendyakin; Mordovia	7:05.02

=== Women ===
Event	Gold		Silver		Bronze	
100 km	Nadezhda Gogoleva; Sakha−Sakha Republic	7:44.50	Dina Zakharchenko; Samara Oblast	7:45.41	Nadezhda Shikhanova; Kirov Oblast	7:55.05

== Cross country (autumn) ==
The 2018 Russian Autumn Cross Country Championships was held in Orenburg on 20–21 October. A total of 58 runners (38 men and 20 women) from 29 regions of Russia took part in two senior races. Competitions were held in cool weather with strong gusty wind. Alexey Vikulov added the title of the strongest on the autumn highway in Orenburg to the victory in the spring national championship in cross country.

=== Men ===
Event	Gold		Silver		Bronze	
10 km	Aleksey Vikulov; Novosibirsk Oblast; Zabaykalsky Krai	32.37	Veniamin Kanybekov; Bashkortostan	32.43	Vildan Gadelshin; Bashkortostan	32.47

=== Women ===
Event	Gold		Silver		Bronze	
6 km	Margarita Novgorodtseva; Kemerovo Oblast	21.32	Lyudmila Lebedeva; Moscow; Mari El	21.41	Natalya Khokhlova; Kurganskaya Oblast	21.48

== Mountain running (long-distance) ==
The 12th Russian Championship in Long Distance Mountain Running took place on 28 October in Krasnaya Polyana, Krasnodar Territory. A total of 42 participants (30 men and 12 women) from 13 regions of Russia took part. Nadezhda Leshchinskaya won the women's run for the fourth year in a row, ahead of Nailiya Yulamanova.

=== Men ===
Event	Gold		Silver		Bronze	
30 km Height difference:+1311 m −1311 m	Yuriy Chechun; Samara Oblast	2:02.47	Ruslan Fattakhov; Bashkortostan	2:03.19	Viktor Samoylov; Samara Oblast	2:04.52

=== Women ===
Event	Gold		Silver		Bronze	
30 km Height difference:+1311 m −1311 m	Nadezhda Leschinskaya; Samara Oblast	2:30.25	Nailiya Yulamanova; Samara Oblast	2:33.00	Aleksandra Zhavoronkova; Samara Oblast	2:36.11
