= List of Russian records in athletics =

The following are the national records in athletics in Russia maintained by All-Russia Athletic Federation (ARAF).

== Outdoor ==
Key to tables: Awaiting ratification Record not kept by ARAF Not ratified or later rescinded by ARAF

# = not recognised by World Athletics

=== Men ===
Event	Record	Athlete	Date	Meet	Place	Ref.
100 m	10.10 (Note: Doubtful wind reading.)	Nikolay Yushmanov	7 June 1986	Brothers Znamensky Memorial	Leningrad, Soviet Union	
100 m	10.10 (+1.3 m/s)	Andrey Yepishin	8 August 2006	European Championships	Gothenburg, Sweden	
200 m	20.23 (−0.4 m/s)	Vladimir Krylov	3 September 1987	World Championships	Rome, Italy	
400 m	44.56	Aleksey Danilov	21 July 2025	Athletics Match meeting U18, U20	Brest, Belarus	
800 m	1:42.47	Yuriy Borzakovskiy	24 August 2001	Memorial Van Damme	Brussels, Belgium	
1000 m	2:15.50	Yuriy Borzakovskiy	22 July 2008	DN Galan	Stockholm, Sweden	
1500 m	3:32.28	Vyacheslav Shabunin	30 June 2000	Golden Gala	Rome, Italy	
Mile	3:49.83	Vyacheslav Shabunin	29 June 2001	Golden Gala	Rome, Italy	
2000 m	4:57.18	Vyacheslav Shabunin	29 June 1997	Meeting du Nord	Villeneuve-d'Ascq, France	
3000 m	7:39.24	Vyacheslav Shabunin	12 July 1995	Nikaia IAAF Grand Prix	Nice, France	
5000 m	13:11.99	Valeriy Abramov	9 September 1981	IAAF Grand Prix	Rieti, Italy	
5000 m	13:11.95	Vladimir Nikitin	24 July 2021	Valeriy Abramov Memorial	Dolgoprudny, Russia	
5 km (road)	14:09	Vyacheslav Shabunin	2 March 2006	Armagh 5k International Road Race	Armagh, United Kingdom	
10,000 m	27:48.30	Vladimir Nikitin	9 August 2025	Russian Championships	Kazan, Russia	
10 km (road)	27:40	Vladimir Nikitin	20 September 2025	Moscow Marathon	Moscow, Russia	
15 km (road)	43:00	Standard				
20,000 m (track)	1:00:16.2	Vladimir Merkushin	30 May 1970		Moscow, Soviet Union	
20,000 m (track)	59:02.0 h	Rashid Sharafetdinov	2 May 1971		Leningrad, Soviet Union	
20 km (road)	58:00	Standard				
One hour	19894 m+	Vladimir Merkushin	30 May 1970		Moscow, Soviet Union	
One hour	20000 m (Note: 59:02.0, hand-timed)	Rashid Sharafetdinov	2 May 1971		Leningrad, Soviet Union	
Half marathon	1:00:43	Vladimir Nikitin	5 September 2021		Yaroslavl, Russia	
25,000 m (track)	1:17:34.0 h	Albert Ivanov	27 September 1955		Moscow, Soviet Union	
25 km (road)	1:15.00	Standard				
25 km (road)	1:14:43+	Grigoriy Andreyev	13 March 2005	Seoul International Marathon	Seoul, South Korea	
30,000 m (track)	1:34:32.2 h	Viktor Baykov	22 June 1963		Moscow, Soviet Union	
30 km (road)	1:30:00	Standard				
Marathon	2:08:08 (Note: by ARAF source; 2:08:07 by World Athletics source)	Vladimir Nikitin	3 May 2026	Kazan Marathon	Kazan, Russia	
50 km	2:45:00	Standard				
100 km	6:08:24	Nikolay Volkov	1 October 2023		Nizhny Novgorod, Russia	
110 m hurdles	12.92 (+0.6 m/s)	Sergey Shubenkov	2 July 2018	Gyulai István Memorial	Székesfehérvár, Hungary	
400 m hurdles	48.05	Denis Kudryavtsev	25 August 2015	World Championships	Beijing, China	
3000 m steeplechase	8:15.54	Pavel Potapovich	4 July 2003	Meeting Gaz de France	Saint-Denis, France	
High jump	2.40 m	Vyacheslav Voronin	5 August 2000	London Grand Prix	London, United Kingdom	
High jump	2.41 m X	Ivan Ukhov	9 May 2014	Qatar Athletic Super Grand Prix	Doha, Qatar	
Pole vault	6.05 m	Maksim Tarasov	16 June 1999	Athens Grand Prix	Athens, Greece	
Long jump	8.56 m (+0.2 m/s)	Aleksandr Menkov	16 August 2013	World Championships	Moscow, Russia	
Triple jump	17.77 m (+1.0 m/s)	Aleksandr Kovalenko	18 July 1987	Soviet Championships	Bryansk, Soviet Union	
Shot put	22.24 m	Sergey Smirnov	21 June 1986	USSR vs. GDR Athletics Match	Tallinn, Soviet Union	
Discus throw	71.86 m	Yuriy Dumchev	29 May 1983	VIII Spartakiad of the Peoples of the USSR	Moscow, Soviet Union	
Hammer throw	86.74 m (WR) (Note: EAA considers this record as Ukrainian)	Yuriy Sedykh	30 August 1986	European Championships	Stuttgart, West Germany	
Hammer throw	86.04 m	Sergey Litvinov	3 July 1986		Dresden, East Germany	
Javelin throw	92.61 m	Sergey Makarov	30 June 2002	Norwich Union Classic	Sheffield, United Kingdom	
Decathlon	8698 pts	Grigoriy Degtyaryev	21–22 June 1984	Soviet Combined Events Championships	Kiev, Soviet Union	
Decathlon	100m (wind) / Long jump (wind) / Shot put / High jump / 400m / 110m H (wind) / Discus / Pole vault / Javelin / 1500m; 10.87 / 7.42 m / 16.03 m / 2.10 m / 49.75 / 14.53 / 51.20 m / 4.90 m / 67.08 m / 4:23.09					
3000 m walk (track)	11:03.01	Vladimir Andreyev	13 July 1997	31st World Formia Meeting	Formia, Italy	
10,000 m walk (track)	37:47.39	Sergey Kozhevnikov	19 June 2026		Saransk (Note: by ARAF source; Cheboksary by EA source), Russia	
10 km walk (road)	37:11	Roman Rasskazov	28 May 2000		Saransk, Russia	
20,000 m walk (track)	1:19:22.5	Aleksey Pershin	7 May 1988		Fana, Norway	
20 km walk (road)	1:17:16	Vladimir Kanaykin	29 September 2007	IAAF World Race Walking Challenge Final	Saransk, Russia	
20 km walk (road)	1:16:43 # (Note: Time not ratified as required three international judges were not present.)	Sergey Morozov	8 June 2008	Russian Race Walking Championships	Saransk, Russia	
30,000 m walk (track)	2:08:21.0	German Skurygin	9 September 2002	Russian Race Walking Championships (track)	Izhevsk, Russia	
35 km walk (road)	2:21:31	Vladimir Kanaykin	19 February 2006	Russian Winter Race Walking Championships	Adler, Russia	
50,000 m walk (track)	3:48:59.0	Vladimir Rezaev	2 May 1980		Fana, Norway	
50 km walk (road)	3:34:14	Denis Nizhegorodov	11 May 2008	World Race Walking Cup	Cheboksary, Russia	
4 × 100 m relay	38.46	Soviet Union; Innokentiy Zharov; Vladimir Krylov; Oleg Fatun; Aleksandr Goremykin	1 September 1990	European Championships	Split, Yugoslavia	
4 × 200 m relay	1:21.63	Russia; Ivanov; Andrey Fedoriv; Oleg Fatun; Grigoryev	5 June 1993	Pearl European Relays	Portsmouth, United Kingdom	
4 × 400 m relay	2:59.45	Russia; Artyom Denmukhametov; Pavel Trenikhin; Denis Kudryavtsev; Pavel Ivashko	29 August 2015	World Championships	Beijing, China	
4 × 400 m relay	2:59.38 X (Note: annulled due to doping violation of Maksim Dyldin)	Russia; Maksim Dyldin; Pavel Ivashko; Nikita Uglov; Vladimir Krasnov	17 August 2014	European Championships	Zürich, Switzerland	
4 × 400 m relay	2:58.06 X (Note: annulled due to doping violation of Denis Alekseyev)	Russia; Maksim Dyldin; Vladislav Frolov; Anton Kokorin; Denis Alekseyev	23 August 2008	Olympic Games	Beijing, China	
4 × 800 m relay	7:11.96	Russia; Sergey Melnikov; Sergey Samoylov; Andrey Loginov; Aleksey Oleynikov	5 June 1993	Pearl European Relays	Portsmouth, United Kingdom	
4 × 800 m relay	7:07.40	Soviet Union; Masunov; Kostetskiy; Matvetev; Kalinkin	5 August 1984		Moscow, Soviet Union	
4 × 1500 m relay	15:12.51	Saint Petersburg; A. Storoshev; T. Petrov; N. Hvorostuhin; A. Haritonov	16 September 2016		Adler, Russia	
4 × 1500 m relay	14:45.63	Soviet Union; Kalutskiey; Yakovlyev; Legeda; Lotarev	4 August 1985		Leningrad, Soviet Union	
Marathon road relay (Ekiden)	2:02.34 #	Russia; Yuriy Abramov (13:47); Yevgeny Rybakov (28:29); Pavel Naumov (14:19); Dmitry Maksimov (29:47); Sergey Ivanov (14:30); Anatoly Rybakov (21:42)	23 November 2005	International Chiba Ekiden	Chiba, Japan	

=== Women ===
Event	Record	Athlete	Date	Meet	Place	Ref.	Video
100 y	10.45+ (+1.5 m/s) ^{[EB]}	Yevgeniya Polyakova	27 May 2010	Golden Spike Ostrava	Ostrava, Czech Republic		
100 m	10.77 (+0.9 m/s)	Irina Privalova	6 July 1994	Athletissima	Lausanne, Switzerland		
200 m	21.87 (±0.0 m/s)	Irina Privalova	25 July 1995	Herculis	Monaco		
300 m	35.78+	Olga Nazarova	26 September 1988	Olympic Games	Seoul, South Korea		
400 m	49.11	Olga Nazarova	25 September 1988	Olympic Games	Seoul, South Korea		
600 m	1:23.78	Natalya Khrushchelyova	2 September 2003	Meeting de Liége	Naimette-Xhovémont, Belgium		
800 m	1:53.43	Nadezhda Olizarenko	27 July 1980	Olympic Games	Moscow, Soviet Union		
1000 m	2:28.98	Svetlana Masterkova	23 August 1996	Memorial Van Damme	Brussels, Belgium		
1500 m	3:52.47	Tatyana Kazankina	13 August 1980	Weltklasse Zürich	Zürich, Switzerland		
Mile	4:12.56	Svetlana Masterkova	14 August 1996	Weltklasse Zürich	Zürich, Switzerland		
2000 m	5:28.72	Tatyana Kazankina	4 August 1984		Moscow, Soviet Union		
3000 m	8:22.62	Tatyana Kazankina	26 August 1984		Leningrad, Soviet Union		
5000 m	14:23.75	Liliya Shobukhova	19 July 2008	Russian Championships	Kazan, Russia		
5 km (road)	15:15	Yelena Romanova	13 June 1993	Schweizer Frauenlauf	Bern, Switzerland		
10,000 m	30:23.07	Alla Zhilyaeva	23 August 2003	World Championships	Saint-Denis, France		
10 km (road)	31:26	Alevtina Ivanova	5 August 2006	Beach to Beacon 10K	Cape Elizabeth, United States		
15 km (road)	48:31	Lyudmila Petrova	8 August 1998	"Russia" 15 km International Run	Moscow, Russia		
20 km (road)	1:05:48+ X	Liliya Shabalova-Shobukhova	9 October 2011	Chicago Marathon	Chicago, United States		
Half marathon	1:08:45	Lyubov Morgunova	12 June 2000	Broloppet	Malmö, Sweden		
25 km (road)	1:23:24+	Galina Bogomolova	22 October 2006	Chicago Marathon	Chicago, United States		
25 km (road)	1:22:08+ X	Liliya Shobukhova	9 October 2011	Chicago Marathon	Chicago, United States		
30 km (road)	1:40:12+	Galina Bogomolova	22 October 2006	Chicago Marathon	Chicago, United States		
30 km (road)	1:38:23+ X	Liliya Shobukhova	9 October 2011	Chicago Marathon	Chicago, United States		
Marathon	2:20:47	Galina Bogomolova	22 October 2006	Chicago Marathon	Chicago, United States		
Marathon	2:18:20 X	Liliya Shobukhova	9 October 2011	Chicago Marathon	Chicago, United States		
50 Miles	5:55:41+	Valentina Liakhova	28 September 1996	100 km Track Trophy	Nantes, France		
100 km	7:10:32	Tatyana Zhirkova	11 September 2004	IAU 100 km World Championships	Winschoten, Netherlands		
100 m hurdles	12.26 (+1.7 m/s)	Lyudmila Narozhilenko	6 June 1992	Gran Premio Expo'92	Seville, Spain		
200 m hurdles (straight)	26.23 (−1.1 m/s)	Natalya Antyukh	25 May 2013	Manchester City Games	Manchester, United Kingdom		
400 m hurdles	52.34	Yuliya Pechonkina	8 August 2003	Russian Championships	Tula, Russia		
2000 m steeplechase	6:11.84	Marina Pluzhnikova	25 July 1994		Saint Petersburg, Russia		
3000 m steeplechase	8:58.81 OR	Gulnara Samitova-Galkina	17 August 2008	Olympic Games	Beijing, China		
High jump	2.07 m	Anna Chicherova	22 July 2011	Russian Championships	Cheboksary, Russia		
Pole vault	5.06 m WR	Yelena Isinbaeva	28 August 2009	Weltklasse Zürich	Zürich, Switzerland		
Long jump	7.52 m (+1.4 m/s) WR	Galina Chistyakova	11 June 1988	Brothers Znamensky Memorial	Leningrad, Soviet Union		
Triple jump	15.34 m (−0.5 m/s)	Tatyana Lebedeva	4 July 2004	Athens Grand Prix	Heraklion, Greece		
Shot put	22.63 m WR	Natalya Lisovskaya	7 June 1987	Brothers Znamensky Memorial	Moscow, Soviet Union		
Discus throw	73.28 m	Galina Savinkova	8 September 1984	Soviet Championships	Donetsk, Soviet Union		
Hammer throw	78.51 m	Tatyana Lysenko	5 July 2012		Cheboksary, Russia		
Hammer throw	78.80 m X	Tatyana Lysenko	16 August 2013	World Championships	Moscow, Russia		
Javelin throw	70.53 m	Mariya Abakumova	1 September 2013	ISTAF Berlin	Berlin, Germany		
Javelin throw	71.99 m X	Mariya Abakumova	2 September 2011	World Championships	Daegu, South Korea		
Heptathlon	7007 pts	Larisa Turchinskaya	10–11 June 1989	Soviet Combined Events Championships	Bryansk, Soviet Union		
Heptathlon	100m H (wind) / High jump / Shot put / 200m (wind) / Long jump (wind) / Javelin / 800m; 13.40 / 1.89 m / 16.45 m / 23.97 / 6.73 m w / 53.94 m / 2:15.31						
Decathlon	7742 pts	Anna Snetkova	14–15 September 2003		Sochi, Russia		
Decathlon	100m (wind) / Long jump (wind) / Shot put / High jump / 400m / 110m H (wind) / Discus / Pole vault / Javelin / 1500m; 12.66 (NWI) / 5.98 m (NWI) / 13.48 m / 1.69 m / 58.88 / 14.19 (NWI) / 36.90 m / 3.70 m / 37.50 m / 5:17.67						
5000 m walk (track)	20:28.05	Tatyana Kalmykova	12 July 2007	World Youth Championships	Ostrava, Czech Republic		
10,000 m walk (track)	40:59.93	Elvira Chepareva	15 August 2024	Russian Championships	Yekaterinburg, Russia		
10 km walk (road)	41:04	Yelena Nikolayeva	20 April 1996	Russian Winter Race Walking Championships	Sochi, Russia		
20,000 m walk (track)	1:26:52.3 h WR	Olimpiada Ivanova	6 September 2001	Goodwill Games	Brisbane, Australia		
20 km walk (road)	1:23:39 #	Elena Lashmanova	9 June 2018	Russian Race Walking Championships	Cheboksary, Russia		
35 km walk (road)	2:38:24	Klavdiya Afanasyeva	18 February 2019		Sochi, Russia		
50 km walk (road)	3:57:08 (Note: Not recognised by World Athletics due to lack of international judges.)	Klavdiya Afanasyeva	15 June 2019	Russian Race Walking Championships	Cheboksary, Russia		
4 × 100 m relay	41.49	Russia; Olga Bogoslovskaya; Galina Malchugina; Natalya Pomoshchnikova-Voronova; Irina Privalova	22 August 1993	World Championships	Stuttgart, Germany		
4 × 200 m relay	1:31.49	Russia; Yuliya Sotnikova; Marina Zhirova; Elena Mizera; Zoya Sokolova	5 June 1993	Pearl European Relays	Portsmouth, United Kingdom		
4 × 400 m relay	3:18.38	Russia; Yelena Ruzina; Tatyana Alekseyeva; Margarita Ponomaryova; Irina Privalova	22 August 1993	World Championships	Stuttgart, Germany		
4 × 800 m relay	7:56.6 h	RSFSR; Zoya Rigel; Lyubov Gurina; Yekaterina Podkopayeva; Tatyana Mishkel	8 September 1980	Soviet Championships	Donetsk, Soviet Union		
4 × 1500 m relay	17:24.65		7 September 2008		Sotchi, Russia		
4 × 1500 m relay	17:22.57	Russia; Polina Dontsova; Darya Yachmenyova; Galina Evsikova; Yuliya Fomenko	7 September 2013	Russian Championships	Adler, Russia		
Marathon road relay (Ekiden)	2:14:51	Liliya Shobukhova; Inga Abitova; Olesya Syreva; Lidiya Grigoryeva; Galina Bogomolova; Mariya Konovalova	23 November 2006	International Chiba Ekiden	Chiba, Japan		

== Indoor ==
=== Men ===
Event	Record	Athlete	Date	Meet	Place	Ref.
50 m	5.64	Aleksandr Porkhomovskiy	4 February 1994	Russian Winter Meeting	Moscow, Russia	
50 m	5.4 h	Sergey Bychkov	7 January 2001		Yekaterinburg, Russia	
60 m	6.52	Andrey Grigoryev	24 February 1995	Russian Championships	Volgograd, Russia	
60 m	6.52	Andrey Yepishin	10 March 2006	World Championships	Moscow, Russia	
60 m	6.3 h	Andrey Prokofyev	5 February 1982		Chelyabinsk, Soviet Union	
60 m	6.3 h	Viktor Bryzgin	4 February 1983		Kiev, Soviet Union	
60 m	6.3 h	Sergey Slukin	24 January 1998		Oryol, Russia	
150 m	16.42	Gleb Tkachenko	11 February 2010	Botnia Games	Korsholm, Finland	
200 m	20.53	Vladimir Krylov	22 February 1987	European Championships	Liévin, France	
300 m	32.75	Roman Smirnov	8 February 2011	Meeting Pas de Calais	Liévin, France	
400 m	45.90	Ruslan Mashchenko	1 March 1998	European Championships	Valencia, Spain	
500 m	1:01.25	Saveliy Savlukov	13 February 2022	Russian Winter Meeting	Moscow, Russia	
600 m	1:15.09	Saveliy Savlukov	7 January 2024	Yalamov Memorial	Ekaterinburg, Russia	
800 m	1:44.15	Yuriy Borzakovskiy	27 January 2001	BW-Bank Meeting	Karlsruhe, Germany	
1000 m	2:17.10	Yuriy Borzakovskiy	1 February 2009	Russian Winter Meeting	Moscow, Russia	
1500 m	3:36.68	Vyacheslav Shabunin	22 February 1998	Meeting Pas de Calais	Liévin, France	
Mile	3:54.77	Vladimir Nikitin	3 February 2019	Russian Winter Meeting	Moscow, Russia	
3000 m	7:39.94	Vladimir Nikitin	9 February 2020	Russian Winter Meeting	Moscow, Russia	
5000 m	13:24.07	Vladimir Nikitin	27 February 2020	Russian Championships	Moscow, Russia	
50 m hurdles	6.44+	Evgeniy Borisov	10 February 2009	Meeting Pas de Calais	Liévin, France	
50 m hurdles	6.44+	Evgeniy Borisov	5 March 2010	Meeting Pas de Calais	Liévin, France	
50 m hurdles	6.4 h	Aleksandr Morozov	16 February 1969		Donetsk, Soviet Union	
60 m hurdles	7.44	Evgeniy Borisov	16 February 2008	European Cup	Moscow, Russia	
60 m hurdles	7.2 h	Igor Kazanov	28 January 1989		Vilnius, Soviet Union	
60 m hurdles	7.3 h	Igor Kazanov	18 January 1986		Minsk, Soviet Union	
300 m hurdles	35.06 OT	Ruslan Mashchenko	9 February 1999	Pirkkahalli	Tampere, Finland	
2000 m steeplechase	5:21.56^{[EB]}	Andrey Farnosov	14 February 2010	Indoor Flanders Meeting	Ghent, Belgium	
High jump	2.42 m	Ivan Ukhov	24 February 2014	Prague Indoor	Prague, Czech Republic	
Pole vault	6.00 m	Radion Gataullin	2 February 1993	Russian Winter Meeting	Moscow, Russia	
Pole vault	6.00 m	Radion Gataullin	13 February 1993	Meeting Pas de Calais	Liévin, France	
Pole vault	6.00 m	Maksim Tarasov	5 February 1999		Budapest, Hungary	
Pole vault	6.02 m (Note: Not recognised by federation.)	Radion Gataullin	4 February 1989		Gomel, Soviet Union	
Long jump	8.43 m	Stanislav Tarasenko	26 January 1994		Moscow, Russia	
Triple jump	17.77 m	Leonid Voloshin	6 February 1994		Grenoble, France	
Shot put	21.40 m	Sergey Smirnov	6 February 1987	Soviet Championships	Penza, Soviet Union	
Weight throw	23.60 m	Yegor Agafonov	9 March 2007	NCAA Men's Division I Championships	Fayetteville, United States	
Heptathlon	6412 pts	Lev Lobodin	7–8 February 2003	Russian Combined Events Championships	Moscow, Russia	
Heptathlon	60m / Long jump / Shot put / High jump / 60m H / Pole vault / 1000m; 6.88 / 7.45 m / 16.67 m / 2.07 m / 7.82 / 5.20 m / 2:46.35					
5000 m walk	18:07.08	Mikhail Shchennikov	14 February 1995	Russian Winter Meeting	Moscow, Russia	
4 × 200 m relay	1:23.04	Russia; Edvin Ivanov; Oleg Fatun; Andrey Fedoriv; Mikhail Vdovin	30 January 1993	Pearl International Games	Glasgow, United Kingdom	
4 × 400 m relay	3:04.82	Russia; Aleksandr Ladeyshchikov; Ruslan Mashchenko; Boris Gorban; Andrey Semyonov	11 March 2001	World Championships	Lisbon, Portugal	
4 × 800 m relay	7:15.77	Moscow Oblast; Roman Trubetskoy; Dmitriy Bukreyev; Dmitriy Bogdanov; Yuriy Borzakovskiy	10 February 2008	Russian Championships	Moscow, Russia	

=== Women ===
Event	Record	Athlete	Date	Meet	Place	Ref.
50 m	5.96+	Irina Privalova	9 February 1995		Madrid, Spain	
50 m	5.9 h	Irina Privalova	7 January 2000		Yekaterinburg, Russia	
50 m	5.9 h	Irina Khabarova	7 January 2000		Yekaterinburg, Russia	
60 m	6.92	Irina Privalova	11 February 1993		Madrid, Spain	
60 m	6.92	Irina Privalova	9 February 1995		Madrid, Spain	
60 m	6.8 h	Irina Sluyusar	19 January 1986		Minsk, Soviet Union	
60 m	6.8 h	Antonina Slyusar	9 January 1988		Donetsk, Soviet Union	
60 m	6.8 h	Yekaterina Leshchova	22 January 1994		Volgograd, Russia	
60 m	6.9 h	Marina Babenko	18 February 1983		Moscow, Soviet Union	
60 m	6.9 h	Svetlana Zhizdrikova	13 January 1985		Moscow, Soviet Union	
60 m	6.9 h	Svetlana Zhizdrikova	26 January 1985		Minsk, Soviet Union	
200 m	22.10	Irina Privalova	19 February 1995	Meeting Pas de Calais	Liévin, France	
300 m	35.45	Irina Privalova	17 January 1993		Moscow, Russia	
400 m	49.68	Natalya Nazarova	18 February 2004	Russian Championships	Moscow, Russia	
500 m	1:06.31 ^{[WB]}	Olesya Krasnomovets	7 January 2006	15th Yalamov Memorial Meeting	Yekaterinburg, Russia	
600 m	1:23.44 ^{[WB]}	Olga Kotlyarova	1 February 2004	Russian Winter Meeting	Moscow, Russia	
800 m	1:57.47	Natalya Tsyganova	7 March 1999	World Championships	Maebashi, Japan	
800 m	1:56.49 X	Yelena Soboleva	9 February 2008		Moscow, Russia	
1000 m	2:32.16	Yuliya Fomenko	25 January 2006	Russian Winter Meeting	Moscow, Russia	
1500 m	3:58.28	Yelena Soboleva	18 February 2006	Russian Championships	Moscow, Russia	
1500 m	3:57.71 X	Yelena Soboleva	9 March 2008	World Championships	Valencia, Spain	
Mile	4:23.49	Olga Komyagina	27 January 2008	Russian Winter Meeting	Moscow, Russia	
Mile	4:20.21 X	Yelena Soboleva	27 January 2008		Moscow, Russia	
2000 m	5:38.98	Mariya Konovalova	7 January 2010	19th Yalamov Memorial Meeting	Yekaterinburg, Russia	
3000 m	8:27.86	Liliya Shobukhova	17 February 2006	Russian Championships	Moscow, Russia	
Two miles	9:41.7 h	Raisa Sadreydinova	3 March 1979	USA vs. USSR Athletics Match	Fort Worth, United States	
5000 m	15:10.63	Olga Yegorova	30 January 2000	Sparkassen Indoor Meeting	Dortmund, Germany	
50 m hurdles	6.65	Lyudmila Narozhilenko	7 February 1993		Grenoble, France	
60 m hurdles	7.69	Lyudmila Narozhilenko	4 February 1990	Soviet Championships	Chelyabinsk, Soviet Union	
60 m hurdles	7.69 X (Note: Athlete failed a doping test after the first mark.)	Lyudmila Narozhilenko	13 February 1993		Liévin, France	
60 m hurdles	7.68 X	Lyudmila Narozhilenko	2 March 1993		San Sebastián, Spain	
60 m hurdles	7.66 X	Lyudmila Narozhilenko	4 March 1993		Seville, Spain	
60 m hurdles	7.63 X	Lyudmila Narozhilenko	4 March 1993		Seville, Spain	
60 m hurdles	7.4 h	Lyudmila Narozhilenko	27 January 1990	Semifinal of Soviet Cup	Chişinău, Soviet Union	
400 m hurdles	58.57	Svetlana Gogoleva	18 February 2012	Meeting National Indoor de Val-de-Reuil	Val-de-Reuil, France	
2000 m steeplechase	6:05.29 ^{[WB]}	Mariya Bykova	22 January 2013	Central FD Regional Championships	Belgorod, Russia	
3000 m steeplechase	9:07.00 ^{[WB]}	Tatyana Petrova	17 February 2006	Russian Championships	Moscow, Russia	
High jump	2.06 m	Anna Chicherova	4 February 2012	Hochsprung mit Musik	Arnstadt, Germany	
Pole vault	5.01 m	Yelena Isinbayeva	23 February 2012	XL Galan	Stockholm, Sweden	
Long jump	7.30 m	Galina Chistyakova	28 January 1989	Semifinal of Soviet Cup	Lipetsk, Soviet Union	
Triple jump	15.36 m	Tatyana Lebedeva	6 March 2004	World Championships	Budapest, Hungary	
Shot put	22.14 m	Natalya Lisovskaya	7 February 1987	Soviet Championships	Penza, Soviet Union	
Pentathlon	4991 pts	Irina Belova	15 February 1992		Berlin, Germany	
Pentathlon	60m H / High jump / Shot put / Long jump / 800m; 8.22 / 1.93 m / 13.25 m / 6.67 m / 2:10.26					
3000 m walk	11:44.00	Alina Ivanova	7 February 1992	Russian Winter Meeting	Moscow, Russia	
5000 m walk	20:10.3 h	Vera Sokolova	30 December 2010	Mordovian Championships	Saransk, Russia	
10,000 m walk	44:38.8 h	Olimpiada Ivanova	21 January 2001	Russian Army Championships	Moscow, Russia	
4 × 200 m relay	1:32.41	Russia; Yekaterina Kondratyeva; Irina Khabarova; Yuliya Pechonkina; Yuliya Gushchina	29 January 2005	Aviva International Match	Glasgow, United Kingdom	
4 × 400 m relay	3:23.37	Russia; Yuliya Gushchina; Olga Kotlyarova; Olga Zaytseva; Olesya Krasnomovets	28 January 2006	Aviva International Match	Glasgow, United Kingdom	
4 × 800 m relay	8:06.24	Moscow; Aleksandra Bulanova; Yekaterina Martynova; Yelena Kofanova; Anna Balakshina	18 February 2011	Russian Championships	Moscow, Russia	

== See also ==
- List of Soviet records in athletics
