= Polina Lukyanenkova =

Russian long jumper

Personal information
- Nationality: Russia; Authorised Neutral Athletes (2021)
- Born: 15 July 1998 (28 years, 18 days old)
- Home town: Krasnodar, Russia
- Education: Kuban State University

Sport
- Sport: Athletics
- Event: Long jump

Achievements and titles
- National finals: 2015 Russian Indoor U18s; • Long jump, 1st (gold); 2016 Russian Indoor U20s; • Long jump, 2nd (silver); 2016 Russian U20s; • Long jump, 1st (gold); 2017 Russian U23s; • Long jump, 1st (gold); 2018 Russian Indoor U23s; • Long jump, 2nd (silver); 2018 Russian Champs; • Long jump, 7th; 2019 Russian Indoors; • Long jump, 2nd (silver); 2019 Russian U23s; • Long jump, 1st (gold); 2019 Russian Champs; • Long jump, 3rd (bronze); 2020 Russian Champs; • Long jump, 1st (gold); 2021 Russian Indoors; • Long jump, 3rd (bronze); 2021 Russian Champs; • Long jump, 1st (gold); 2022 Russian Champs; • Long jump, 2nd (silver)
- Personal bests: LJ: • Outdoor: 6.65m (+1.1) (2021); • Indoor: 6.48m (2021)
- Updated on 24 December 2023

Polina Lukyanenkova (Russian: Полина Лукьяненкова; born 15 July 1998) is a Russian long jumper from Krasnodar. She is a two-time Russian Athletics Championships winner, in 2020 and 2021.

== Biography ==
While studying at Kuban State University in Krasnodar, Lukyanenkova won her first national title at the U18 level in 2015 with a 5.93 metres leap.

In 2020, Lukyanenkova won her first senior national title with a 6.57 m showing.

In 2021, Lukyanenkova was cleared to compete as an Authorized Neutral Athlete, necessary to compete internationally due to the suspension of the Russian Athletics Federation. She went on to compete as a neutral at the 2021 BAUHAUS-galan, finishing 6th and scoring 3 points in the 2021 Diamond League standings.

During the 2022 Russian Athletics Week, Lukyanenkova won the Day of Long Jump and Triple Jump with a 6.54 metres mark.

== Statistics ==
=== Personal bests ===
Event	Mark	Place	Competition	Venue	Date
Long jump (outdoor)	6.65 m (+1.1 m/s)	1q	Russian Athletics Championships	Cheboksary, Russia	26 June 2021
Long jump (indoor)	6.48 m	2nd place, silver medalist(s)	Russian Winter Meeting	Moscow, Russia	7 February 2021
