= Yekaterina Ivonina =

Russian distance runner

Personal information
- Full name: Yekaterina Mikhailovna Ivonina
- Nationality: Russian
- Born: 14 June 1994 (age 32)

Sport
- Country: Russia
- Sport: Athletics
- Event: 3000 metres steeplechase
- Coached by: S. A. Popov

Achievements and titles
- World finals: 2019 (19th)
- National finals: 4 Russian titles
- Personal best: 3000 m s'chase: 9:13.76 (2021)

Yekaterina Mikhailovna Ivonina (Russian: Екатерина Михайловна Ивонина; born 14 June 1994) is a Russian distance runner who specialises in the 3000 metres steeplechase. She is a four-time winner of the steeplechase at the Russian Athletics Championships and competed as a neutral athlete at the 2019 World Athletics Championships.

Ivonina is from in Kirov, Kirov Oblast. Her athletic career initially focused on mountain running and in this discipline she performed at the World Mountain Running Championships in 2011 and 2012, and shared in the junior team gold medal at the 2013 European Mountain Running Championships.

She won her first national title in the 2000 metres steeplechase at the 2013 Russian Under-20 Indoor Championships. A win the in 3000 m steeplechase at the 2015 Russian Team Championships brought Ivonina her first international selections on the track, and she went on to finish 11th at the 2015 European Team Championships and seventh at the 2015 European Athletics U23 Championships. She began training with S. A. Popov, who coached former world champion Tatyana Tomashova among others.

Ivonina's international career came to a halt with the suspension of Russian Athletics by the International Association of Athletics Federations, following investigations into a systemic doping program in November 2015. This left Ivonina to compete at national level only for the following three years. In 2016, she won the Russian under-23 indoor title over 3000 metres then followed this with her first senior national steeplechase title at the 2016 Russian Athletics Championships. She did not compete in 2017, but returned in 2018 to win a second Russian title in the steeplechase as well as a win at the Russian Cup event.

She sought to compete internationally under the Authorised Neutral Athletes programme and was accepted, leading to an appearance at the 2019 World Athletics Championships, though she did not progress beyond the heats. Restrictions due to the COVID-19 pandemic meant she made only three appearances in 2020: third in the 3000 m at the 2020 Russian Athletics Indoor Championships, a third steeplechase win at the 2020 Russian Athletics Championships, and first in the 1500 metres at the Russian Team Championships. A combination of pandemic restrictions and her failure to be approved to compete at the delayed 2020 Summer Olympics meant her only performance of note in 2021 was a steeplechase win at the 2021 Russian Athletics Championships.

== International competitions ==
Representing Russia
Year	Competition	Venue	Position	Event	Result	Notes
2011	World Mountain Running Championships	Tirana, Albania	17th	Junior race	23:27	
2011	World Mountain Running Championships	Tirana, Albania	5th	Junior team	24 pts	
2012	World Mountain Running Championships	Temù-Ponte di Legno, Italy	11th	Junior race	23:02	
2012	World Mountain Running Championships	Temù-Ponte di Legno, Italy	4th	Junior team	21 pts	
2012	European Mountain Running Championships	Denizli-Pamukkale, Turkey	8th	Junior race	23:03	
2012	European Mountain Running Championships	Denizli-Pamukkale, Turkey	5th	Junior team	23 pts	
2013	European Mountain Running Championships	Borovets, Bulgaria	11th	Junior race	28:59	
2013	European Mountain Running Championships	Borovets, Bulgaria	1st	Junior team	24 pts	
2015	European Team Championships Super League	Cheboksary, Russia	11th	3000 m s'chase	10:34.55	
2015	European U23 Championships	Tallinn, Estonia	7th	3000 m s'chase	9:58.95	
2019	World Championships	Doha, Qatar	19th	3000 m s'chase	9:35.59	5th in heat 3 Competed as neutral athlete

== National titles ==
- Russian Athletics Championships
  - 3000 m steeplechase: 2016, 2018, 2020, 2021

== Personal bests ==
All information from World Athletics

- 1500 metres: 4:10.00 min (2020)
- 3000 metres: 9:04.90 min (2019)
- 5000 metres: 19:00.80 min (2012)
- 3000 metres steeplechase: 9:13.76 min (2021)
- 5K run: 16:29 min (2018)
- 1500 metres indoor: 4:14.86 min (2019)
- 3000 metres indoor: 8:55.56 min (2020)
- 2000 metres steeplechase indoor: 6:34.90 min (2013)

== Seasonal rankings ==
3000 metres steeplechase
Year	Time	World ranking	European ranking
2012	10:56.63	699	244
2013	10:16.90	222	87
2014	10:23.44	299	118
2015	9:36.79	43	12
2016	9:24.66	20	2
2017	—	—	—
2018	9:16.68	13	1
2019	9:35.59	37	13
2020	9:16.84	3	1
2021	9:13.76	11	2

== See also ==
- List of Russian Athletics Championships winners
