= Olga Mullina =

Russian pole vaulter (born 1992)

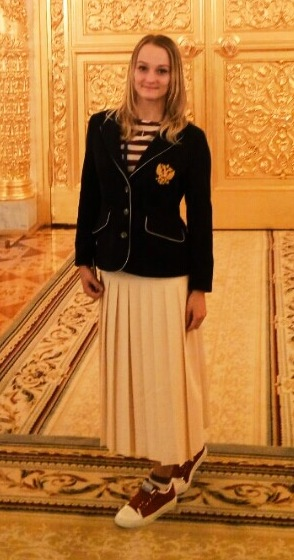
- Olga Mullina in 2016

Personal information
- Full name: Olga Yuryevna Mullina
- Nationality: Russian
- Born: 1 August 1992 (age 33)

Sport
- Sport: Athletics
- Event: Pole vault

Olga Yuryevna Mullina (Russian: Ольга Юрьевна Муллина; born 1 August 1992) is a Russian pole vaulter. She competed in the women's pole vault at the 2017 World Championships in Athletics.

== International competitions ==
Year	Competition	Venue	Position	Event	Result	Notes
2015	Universiade	Gwangju, South Korea	4th	Pole vault	4.35 m	
2017	World Championships	London, United Kingdom	8th	Pole vault	4.55 m	
2018	World Indoor Championships	Birmingham, United Kingdom	9th	Pole vault	4.60 m	
2018	European Championships	Berlin, Germany	11th	Pole vault	4.30 m	
2019	European Indoor Championships	Glasgow, United Kingdom	11th (q)	Pole vault	4.50 m	

== National titles ==
- Russian Athletics Championships
  - Pole vault: 2018
