= Russian Winter Meeting =

Sports event in Moscow, Russia

Russian Winter
- Date: February
- Location: Moscow, Russia
- Event type: Indoor track and field
- Established: 1992
- Website: Russian Winter

The Russian Winter Meeting (Russian: Русская Зима) is an annual indoor track and field competition which is held at the Kutz Arena within the CSKA Universal Sports Hall in Moscow, Russia, every February. The event is part of the annual IAAF Indoor Permit Meeting series.

The meeting came into being in 1992, following the dissolution of the Soviet Union, and it was the first athletics event to be held by the newly created governing body for the sport – the All-Russia Athletic Federation. Three world indoor records were broken at the first event and the history of the competition has featured numerous world, continental and national records since then.

The competition regularly attracts the foremost Russian track and field athletes. It began to take on an increasingly significant international dimension from 2000 onwards – the meeting had competitors from nine countries in 2003 but by the 2011 edition it featured athletes from twenty-five countries.

The programme of events in Moscow is often experimental as it regularly contains running events over unconventional distances, such as 300 m, 600 m and 1000 m races.

== Meet records ==
=== Men ===
Men's meeting records of the Russian Winter Meeting
| Event | Record | Athlete | Nationality | Date | Ref. |
|---|---|---|---|---|---|
| 50 m | 5.64 | Aleksandr Porkhomovskiy | Russia | 4 February 1994 | |
| 60 m | 6.48 | Kim Collins | Saint Kitts and Nevis | 1 February 2015 | |
| 200 m | 20.72 | Jeff Williams | United States | 1996 | |
| 300 m | 32.93 | Maksim Dyldin | Russia | 1 February 2009 | |
| 400 m | 45.80 | Pavel Maslák | Czech Republic | 1 February 2015 | |
| 500 m | 1:01.25 | Saveliy Savlukov | Russia | 13 February 2022 | |
| 600 m | 1:15.26 | Adam Kszczot | Poland | 5 February 2012 | |
| 800 m | 1:46.65 | Yuriy Borzakovskiy | Russia | 25 January 2006 | |
| 1000 m | 2:16.76 | Haron Keitany | Kenya | 1 February 2009 | |
| 1500 m | 3:35.19 | Vénuste Niyongabo | Burundi | 1996 | |
| Mile | 3:54.77 | Vladimir Nikitin | Russia | 3 February 2019 | |
| 2000 m | 5:04.06 | Pavel Potapovich | Russia | 1 February 2004 | |
| 3000 m | 7:39.94 | Vladimir Nikitin | Russia | 9 February 2020 | |
| Two miles | 8:23.94 | Shedrack Kibet Korir | Kenya | 28 January 2007 | |
| 60 m hurdles | 7.46 | Evgeny Pechonkin | Russia | 2002 | |
| 110 m hurdles | 13.34 | Allen Johnson | United States | 14 February 1995 | |
| High jump | 2.39 m | Ivan Ukhov | Russia | 28 January 2007 | |
| Pole vault | 6.00 m | Radion Gataullin | Russia | 1993 | |
| Long jump | 8.30 m | Vitaliy Shkurlatov | Russia | 2000 | |
| Long jump | 8.30 m | Aleksandr Menkov | Russia | 2 February 2014 | |
| Long jump | 8.30 m | Aleksandr Menkov | Russia | 3 February 2019 | |
| Triple jump | 17.25 m | Yoelbi Quesada | Cuba | 1995 | |
| Shot put | 20.82 m | Maksim Afonin | Russia | 5 February 2017 | |
| 5000 m race walk | 18:07.08 | Mikhail Shchennikov | Russia | 14 February 1995 | |

=== Women ===
Women's meeting records of the Russian Winter Meeting
| Event | Record | Athlete | Nationality | Date | Ref. |
|---|---|---|---|---|---|
| 50 m | 6.00 | Irina Privalova | Russia | 1993 | |
| 50 m | 6.00 | Merlene Ottey | Jamaica | 4 February 1994 | |
| 60 m | 6.95 | Irina Privalova | Russia | 1995 | |
| 100 m | 11.23 | Svetlana Goncharenko | Russia | 1998 | |
| 200 m | 22.93 | Natalia Voronova | Russia | 1995 | |
| 300 m | 36.38 | Antonina Krivoshapka | Russia | 1 February 2009 | |
| 400 m | 50.15 | Olga Zaytseva | Russia | 2001 | |
| 600 m | 1:23.44 | Olga Kotlyarova | Russia | 1 February 2004 | |
| 800 m | 1:57.53 | Larisa Chzhao | Russia | 2005 | |
| 1000 m | 2:32.16 | Yuliya Chizhenko | Russia | 25 January 2006 | |
| 1500 m | 4:05.84 | Yelena Korobkina | Russia | 9 February 2020 | |
| Mile | 4:31.51 | Svetlana Aplachkina | Russia | 3 February 2019 | |
| 60 m hurdles | 7.89 | Lolo Jones | United States | 5 February 2012 | |
| High jump | 2.05 m | Mariya Lasitskene | Russia | 9 February 2020 | |
| Pole vault | 4.86 m | Anzhelika Sidorova | Russia | 4 February 2018 | |
| Pole vault | 4.86 m | Anzhelika Sidorova | Russia | 9 February 2020 | |
| Long jump | 7.08 m | Larisa Berezhnaya | Ukraine | 1992 | |
| Triple jump | 14.97 m | Tatyana Lebedeva | Russia | 1998 | |
| Shot put | 20.36 m | Larisa Peleshenko | Russia | 2000 | |
| 3000 m race walk | 11:44.10 | Anisya Kirdyapkina | Russia | 5 February 2012 | |
| 4 × 800 m relay | 4:37.43 | Natalya Gorelova; Olga Kuznetsova; Yelena Afanasyeva; Yekaterina Podkopayeva | Russia | 4 February 1994 | |
