= Russian Athletics Championships =

Annual outdoor track and field competition

- Current season, competition or edition: 2026 Russian Athletics Championships
- Sport: Athletics
- Founded: 1908 & 1992
- Country: Russia

The Russian Athletics Championships (Russian: Чемпионат России по лёгкой атлетике) is an annual outdoor track and field competition organised by the All-Russia Athletic Federation (ARAF), which serves as the Russian national championship for the sport. It is typically held as a four-day event in the Russian summer around late June to early August. The venue of the championships is decided on an annual basis.

The competition was first held in 1908, during the time of the Russian Empire. The competition had nine editions during this period, lasting up to 1916, at which point it was ceased as a result of the October Revolution and was effectively replaced in 1920 by the inauguration of the Soviet Athletics Championships. During this period, separate championships for the Russian Soviet Federative Socialist Republic were occasionally held (with the first two editions occurring in 1922 and 1927 in Moscow), though mostly the Russian championships was merged into the larger Soviet one. After the dissolution of the Soviet Union in 1991, Russia was restored as an independent country and the Russian Athletics Championships was re-initiated, starting from 1992 after a shared CIS Athletics Championships in 1991.

The modern Russian Championships are using as a qualifying event for selection for the international team for major events including the Olympic Games and the World Championships in Athletics.

== Events ==
On the current programme a total of 38 individual Russian Championship athletics events are contested, divided evenly between men and women. For each of the sexes, there are six track running events, three obstacle events, four jumps, four throws, and two relays.

Track running

- 100 metres, 200 metres, 400 metres, 800 metres, 1500 metres, 5000 metres

Obstacle events

- 100 metres hurdles (women only), 110 metres hurdles (men only), 400 metres hurdles, 3000 metres steeplechase

Jumping events

- Pole vault, high jump, long jump, triple jump

Throwing events

- Shot put, discus throw, javelin throw, hammer throw

Relays

- 4 × 100 metres relay, 4 × 400 metres relay

Separate championships are held for the 10,000 metres, combined track and field events, racewalking, road running, cross country running (spring and autumn), mountain running (uphill and downhill), 24-hour run, and relay races. A winter outdoor throwing championships is also held in discus, javelin and hammer throw, while the shot put is incorporated into the Russian Indoor Athletics Championships.

== Editions ==
=== Russian Empire ===
Edition	Year	Venue	Date	Stadium
1	1908	St. Petersburg	14–15 June	Krestovsky Island
2	1909	St. Petersburg	20–21 June	
3	1910	Riga	26–27 June	
4	1911	St. Petersburg	9–10 July	
5	1912	Moscow	8 September	
6	1913	St. Petersburg	20–22 July	
7	1914	Riga	6–11 July	Riga Hippodrome
8	1915	Moscow	15–16 August	OLLS Stadium
9	1916	Petrograd	27–29 August	

=== Russian Federation ===
Edition	Year	Venue	Date	Stadium	Notes
1	1992	Moscow	18–21 July	Lokomotiv Stadium	
2	1993	Moscow	18–20 June	Lokomotiv Stadium	
3	1994	St. Petersburg	14–16 July	Petrovsky Stadium	
4	1995	Moscow	16–18 June	Lokomotiv Stadium	
5	1996	St. Petersburg	1–5 July	Petrovsky Stadium	
6	1997	Tula	7–10 July	Arsenal Stadium	
7	1998	Moscow	31 July–3 August	Luzhniki Stadium	
8	1999	Tula	29 July–1 August	Arsenal Stadium	
9	2000	Tula	22–26 July	Arsenal Stadium	
10	2001	Tula	12–15 July	Arsenal Stadium	
11	2002	Cheboksary	11–14 July	Cheboksary Olympic Stadium	
12	2003	Tula	7–10 August	Arsenal Stadium	
13	2004	Tula	24–25 July, 29 July–1 August	Arsenal Stadium	
14	2005	Tula	10–13 July	Arsenal Stadium	
15	2006	Tula	11–15 June	Arsenal Stadium	
16	2007	Tula	31 July–3 August	Arsenal Stadium	
17	2008	Kazan	17–20 July	Central Stadium	
18	2009	Cheboksary	23–26 July	Cheboksary Olympic Stadium	Results
19	2010	Saransk	12–15 July	Start Stadium	Results
20	2011	Cheboksary	21–24 July	Cheboksary Olympic Stadium	Results
21	2012	Cheboksary	3–6 July	Cheboksary Olympic Stadium	Results
22	2013	Moscow	22–25 July	Luzhniki Stadium	Results
23	2014	Kazan	23–26 July	Central Stadium	Results
24	2015	Cheboksary	3–5 August	Cheboksary Olympic Stadium	
25	2016	Cheboksary	20–23 June	Cheboksary Olympic Stadium	
26	2017	Zhukovskiy	28–30 July	Meteor Stadium	
27	2018	Kazan	19–22 July	Central Stadium	
28	2019	Cheboksary	24–27 July	Cheboksary Olympic Stadium	
	2022	Cheboksary	2–5 August	Cheboksary Olympic Stadium	
	2023	Cheboksary	3–6 August	Cheboksary Olympic Stadium	
	2024	Yekaterinburg	15–18 August	Kalininets Stadium	Results

== Championships records ==
=== Men ===
Event	Record	Athlete	Date	Place	Ref.
100 m	10.12 (+0.6 m/s)	Alexander Porkhomovsky	1994		
200 m	20.51 (+1.7 m/s)	Oleg Sergeyev	31 July 2004	Tula	
400 m	44.83	Anton Galkin	2004		
800 m	1:44.72	Yuriy Borzakovskiy	2004		
1500 m	3.36.14	Valentin Smirnov	2011		
5000 m	13:29.40	Vladimir Nikitin	2017		
10,000 m	27:48.30	Vladimir Nikitin	9 August 2025	Kazan	
Marathon	2:11:26	Fedor Shutov	2016		
3000 metres steeplechase	8:19.19	Maksim Yakushev	2017		
110 metres hurdles	13.19 (−0.1 m/s)	Sergey Shubenkov	2013		
400 metres hurdles	48.54	Boris Gorban	2001		
High jump	2.39 m	Ivan Ukhov	2012		
Pole vault	6.01 m	Igor Trandenkov	1996		
Long jump	8.34 m (+1.4 m/s)	Andrey Ignatov	1995		
Triple jump	17.68 m (+0.4 m/s)	Danil Burkenya	2004		
Shot put	21.51 m	Maksim Sidorov	2012		
Discus throw	65.93 m	Bogdan Pishchalnikov	2010		
Hammer throw	82.28 m	Ilya Konovalov	2003		
Javelin throw	90.33 m	Sergey Makarov	2005		
Decathlon	8601 points	Ilya Shkurenyov	2017		
Decathlon	100m (wind) / Long jump (wind) / Shot put / High jump / 400m / 110m H (wind) / Discus / Pole vault / Javelin / 1500m; 10.89 / 7.58 m / 14.15 m / 2.12 m / 49.00 / 13.95 / 44.91 m / 5.30 m / 60.29 m / 4:28.35				
10,000 m walk (track)	38:14.24	Vasiliy Mizinov	2 August 2022	Chelyabinsk	
20 km walk	1:16:43	Sergey Morozov	2008		
50 km walk	3:35:29	Denis Nizhegorodov	2004		
4 × 100 m relay	39.55	Saint Petersburg; Vyacheslav Shevelyov; Konstantin Petryashov; Alexander Khutte; Arthur Reysbich	2013		
4 × 400 m relay	3:04.72	Saint-Petersburg; Maxim Rafilovich; Andrey Rudenko; Andrey Kukharenko; Mikhail Filatov	2017		

=== Women ===
Event	Record	Athlete	Date	Place	Ref.
100 metres	10.89 (+1.9 m/s)	Irina Privalova	1992		
200 metres	22.05 (+1.7 m/s)	Irina Privalova	1992		
400 metres	49.16	Antonina Krivoshapka	2012		
800 metres	1:56.00	Tatyana Andrianova	2008		
1500 metres	3:58.68	Yuliya Fomenko	2005		
5000 metres	14:23.75	Liliya Shobukhova	2008		
10,000 metres	30:29.36	Liliya Shobukhova	2009		
Marathon	2:28:34	Tatyana Petrova Arkhipova	2016		
3000 metres steeplechase	9:08.21	Gulnara Samitova-Galkina	2008		
100 metres hurdles	12.47 (+1.1 m/s)	Marina Azyabina	1993		
400 metres hurdles	52.34 NR	Yuliya Pechonkina	2003		
High jump	2.07 m NR	Anna Chicherova	2011		
Pole vault	4.90 m	Yelena Isinbayeva	2016		
Long jump	7.33 m (+0.4 m/s)	Tatyana Lebedeva	2004		
Triple jump	15.14 m (+1.9 m/s)	Nadezhda Alekhina	2009		
Shot put	20.79 m	Larisa Peleshenko	2001		
Shot put	20.79 m	Irina Korzhanenko	2004		
Discus throw	67.58 m	Natalya Sadova	2004		
Hammer throw	78.51 m	Tatyana Lysenko	2012		
Javelin throw	66.00 m	Tatyana Shikolenko	2003		
Heptathlon	6765 pts	Yelena Prokhorova	22–23 July 2000	Tula	
Heptathlon	100m H (wind) / High jump / Shot put / 200m (wind) / Long jump (wind) / Javelin / 800m; 13.54 / 1.82 m / 14.30 m / 23.37 / 6.72 m / 43.40 m / 2:04.27				
10,000 m walk (track)	40:59.93	Elvira Chepareva	15 August 2024	Yekaterinburg	
20 km walk	1:24:58	Elena Lashmanova	2016		
4 × 100 m relay	43.30	Moscow; Marina Panteleyeva; Natalia Rusakova; Elizabeth Savlinis; Christina Sivkova	2014		
4 × 400 m relay	3:25.18	Sverdlovsk Region; Olga Kotlyarova; Tatyana Veshkurova; Yulia Mulyukova; Svetlana Pospelova	2006		

== See also ==
- List of Russian records in athletics
