= Lyudmila Lebedeva =

Russian middle-distance runner

Personal information
- Born: 23 May 1990 (age 35)

Sport
- Country: Russia
- Sport: Track and field
- Event: 3000 metres steeplechase

Lyudmila Lebedeva (born 23 May 1990) is a Russian middle-distance runner. She competed in the 3000 metres steeplechase event at the 2015 World Championships in Athletics in Beijing, China.
