= Natalya Aristarkhova =

Russian athlete

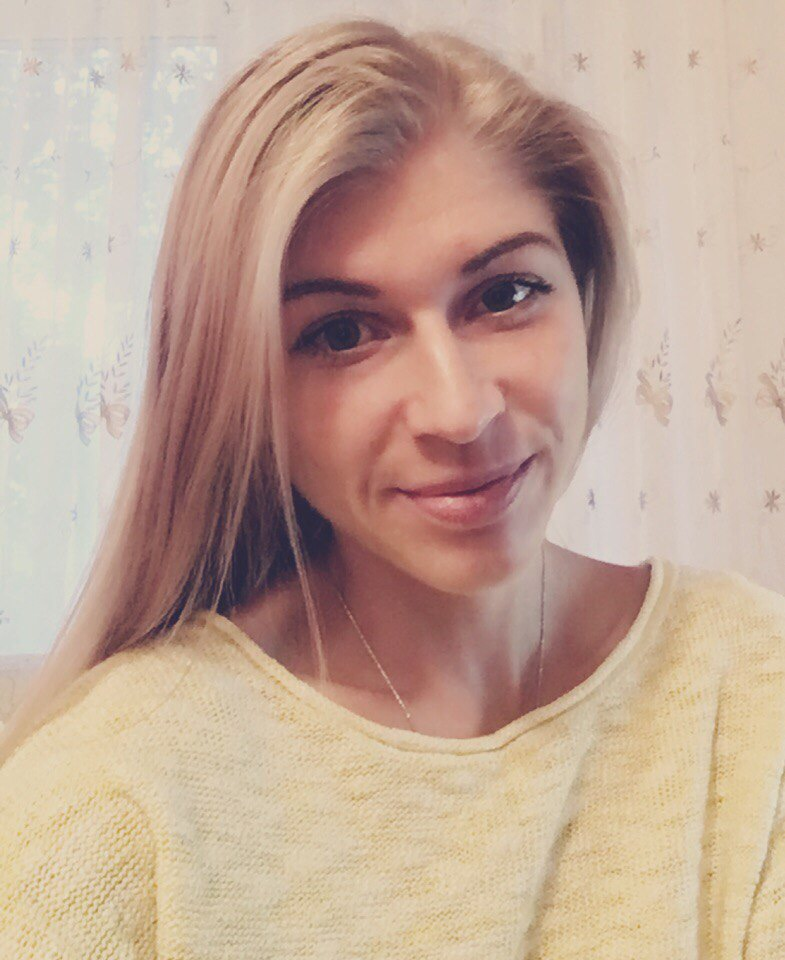

Personal information
- Born: 31 October 1989 (age 36)

Sport
- Country: Russia
- Sport: Track and field
- Event: 3000 metres steeplechase

Natalya Aristarkhova (born 31 October 1989) is a Russian middle-distance runner. She competed in the 3000 metres steeplechase event at the 2015 World Championships in Athletics in Beijing, China.
