= Irina Ivanova =

Russian pole vaulter

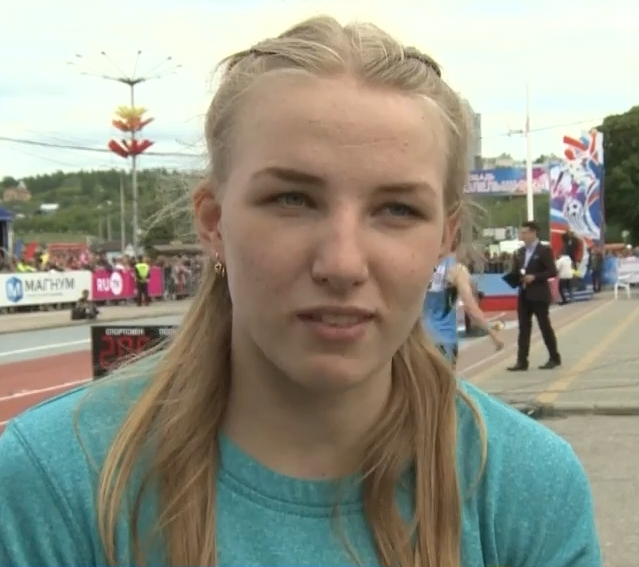
- Irina Ivanova in June 2018

Personal information
- Nationality: Russian
- Born: 19 April 1996 (age 29)

Sport
- Sport: Athletics
- Event: Pole vault

Irina Ivanova (born 19 April 1996) is a Russian athlete. She competed in the women's pole vault event at the 2019 World Athletics Championships.
