= Yelena Panova (discus thrower) =

Russian discus thrower

Personal information
- Born: 2 March 1987 (age 39)

Sport
- Country: Russia
- Sport: Track and field
- Updated on 29 August 2015

Yelena Aleksandrovna Panova (born 2 March 1987) is a female discus thrower from Russia. She competed in the Women's discus throw event at the 2015 World Championships in Athletics in Beijing, China.

== See also ==
- Russia at the 2015 World Championships in Athletics
