= Kristina Makarenko =

Russian sprinter

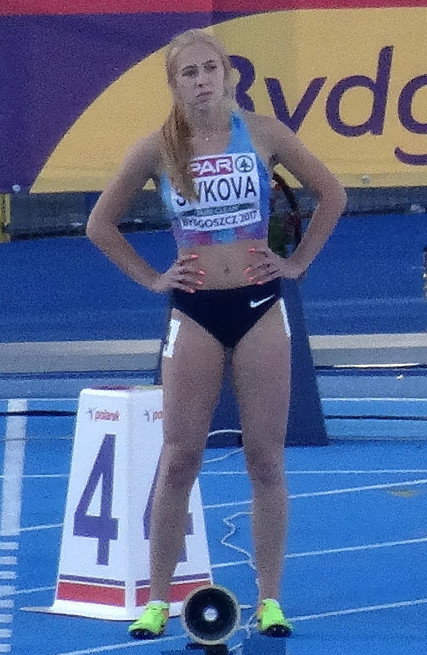
- Kristina Makarenko (then Sivkova) in 2017

Personal information
- Nationality: Russian
- Born: 28 February 1997 (age 29) Kormilovka, Kormilovsky District, Omsk Oblast, Russia

Sport
- Country: Russia
- Sport: Athletics
- Event: Sprint

Achievements and titles
- Personal bests: 60 m: 7.09 (Moscow 2020, indoor); 100 m: 11.00 (Cheboksary 2016); 200 m: 23.35 (Chelyabinsk 2018); 200 m: 23.88 (Volgograd 2017, indoor)

Kristina Andreyevna Makarenko (Russian: Кристина Андреевна Макаренко; born 28 February 1997), née Sivkova, is a Russian athlete who specialises in sprint.

She is married to athlete Artem Makarenko. Their marriage took place in September 2019.
