= Elvira Khasanova =

Russian racewalker (born 2000)

Personal information
- Nationality: Russian
- Born: 10 January 2000 (age 26) Mozhga, Russia

Sport
- Sport: Athletics
- Event: Racewalking

Elvira Albertovna Khasanova (Russian: Эльвира Альбертовна Хасанова; born 10 January 2000) is a Russian racewalking athlete of Tatar descent. She qualified to represent the Russian Olympic Committee at the 2020 Summer Olympics in Tokyo 2021, competing in women's 20 kilometres walk.
