= Klavdiya Afanasyeva =

Russian racewalker

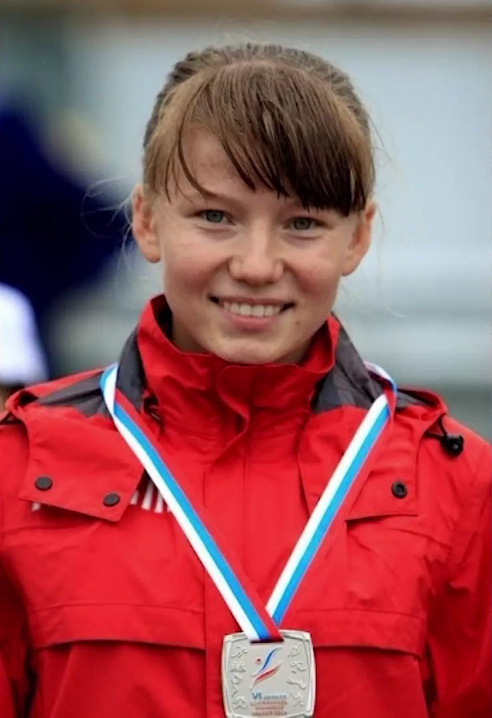

Personal information
- Nationality: Russian
- Born: 15 January 1996 (age 30)

Sport
- Country: Russia; Authorised Neutral Athletes (2017-18)
- Sport: Women's Athletics
- Event: Racewalk
Medal record
Representing Russia
European Athletics U20 Championships
Gold medal – first place	2015 Eskilstuna	10,000 m race walk
Representing Authorised Neutral Athletes
European Athletics U23 Championships
Gold medal – first place	2017 Bydgoszcz	20 km race walk

Klavdiya Yuryevna Afanasyeva (Russian: Кла́вдия Ю́рьевна Афана́сьева; born 15 January 1996) is a Russian racewalker. She won gold medals in the European U20 and U23 championships in the 10,000 m race walk and 20 km race walk respectively. Though she has never tested positive for an anti-doping violation, in May 2018 she was suspended from international competition due to participating in a training camp including banned coach Viktor Chegin.

== Career ==
Afanasyeva began competing on the national level in 2012 as a sixteen-year-old, finishing fourth at the Russian Winter Race Walking Championship and later winning the Chuvash Republic Championships. Her first international competition was in 2013, when she finished 5th in the 5000 m race walk at the 2013 World Youth Championships in Athletics.

In 2016, the Russian Athletics Federation was banned from international competition from the IAAF for state-sponsored doping, meaning no Russian athletes were allowed to participate in the Olympics or any other international competition. In 2017, the IAAF began to accept a limited number of athletes training in Russia to compete as Authorized Neutral Athletes (ANA), and Afanasyeva was among the nineteen Russian athletes, and the only racewalker, cleared to compete in this manner at the 2017 World Championships in Athletics.

Audio interview with Afanasyeva (in Russian) by Russian news organization Chuvash National Broadcasting Company

At the 2017 World Championships, Afanasyeva competed in the 20 km walk. She was in the top ten at the 10 km split passed in 44:10, but she was ultimately one of six athletes disqualified for IAAF rule 230.6(a) "Repeated failure to comply with the definition of Race Walking."

In May 2018, Afanasyeva's status as an Authorized Neutral Athlete was suspended by the IAAF, along with that of four other Russian racewalkers, for participating in an April training camp that included coach Viktor Chegin, who has received a lifetime ban from the sport. This prevented her from competing in any international competitions, including the 2018 IAAF World Race Walking Team Championships in China that month which she had qualified for.

On June 9, 2018, Afanasyeva returned to competition for the first time since 2017, winning the 50 km race walk at the Russian Race Walking Championship.
