= Vladimir Nikitin (runner) =

Russian runner (born 1992)

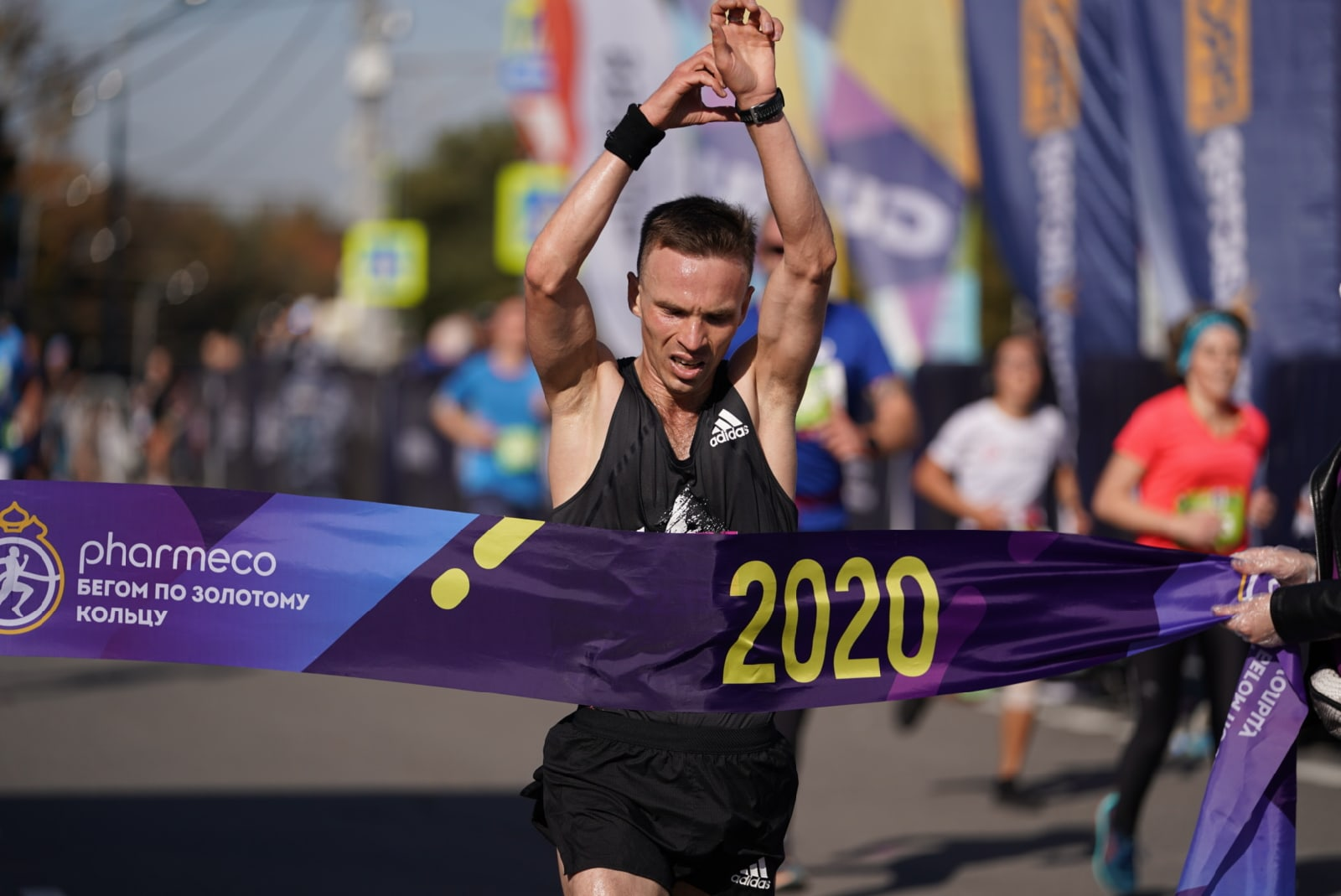

Personal information
- Born: 5 August 1992 (age 33)

Sport
- Country: Russia
- Sport: Track and field
- Event(s): 1500 metres, 5000 metres, 10,000 metres

Vladimir Nikitin (born 5 August 1992) is a Russian middle-distance and long-distance runner. He qualified for the 2020 Summer Olympics with his 1500 metres time of 3:34.69.
