= Athletics at the 2020 Summer Olympics – Qualification =

For the athletics at the 2020 Summer Olympics competitions, the following qualification systems were in place. Qualification ended on 29 June 2021, but for marathon and 50 km race walking, it ended on 31 May 2021. Some 1900 athletes, from 196 countries, competed. 103 countries qualified also through Universality places (initially 101, 61 men and 40 women).

== Qualifying standards ==
A National Olympic Committee (NOC) may enter up to 3 qualified athletes in each individual event if all athletes meet the entry standard during the qualifying period. An NOC may also enter a maximum of 1 qualified relay team per event. Under the universality rule, NOCs may enter one male athlete and one female athlete, regardless of time, if they have no athletes of that gender meeting the entry standard. This makes it possible for every NOC to have a minimum of two representatives in the sports. These universality spots cannot be used in the combined events, the 10,000 metres, or the 3,000 metre steeplechase.

The qualifying system for Tokyo 2020 saw fundamental changes from the previous Olympics. While the qualification from Rio 2016 and other previous editions relied on qualifying standards, Tokyo 2020 is primarily based on world ranking. World Athletics, the global sport governing body formerly known as IAAF until a name change in 2019, continues to set qualifying times, but these are "set for the sole purpose of qualifying athletes with exceptional performances unable to qualify through the World Athletics Rankings pathway." The number of entrants per event is capped, with different caps for different events varying from 24 athletes for the combined events to 80 (finally 110) athletes for the marathons.

The World Athletics Rankings are based on the average of the best five results for the athlete over the qualifying period. The results are weighted by the importance of the meet.

The qualifying standards may be obtained in various meets during the given period approved by the World Athletics. The qualifying period for the marathon and the 50 km race walk occurs from 1 January 2019 to 5 April 2020 and from 1 December 2020 to 31 May 2021 and the qualifying for the 10,000 m, 20 km race walk and combined events occurs from 1 January 2019 to 5 April 2020 and from 1 December 2020 to 29 June 2021, with the rest of the track and field events happening from 1 May 2019 to 5 April 2020 and from 1 December 2020 to 29 June 2021. The most recent Area Championships may be counted in the ranking, even if not during the qualifying period. On 6 April 2020, the World Athletics announced that the qualification period for the Games was suspended until 30 November 2020, in response to the coronavirus pandemic. In July 2020, World Athletics announced that the suspension period would be lifted for the road events (marathons and race walks) on 1 September 2020.

For the relays, a maximum of sixteen qualified NOCs shall be entitled to each event. The top eight teams in each event at the 2019 World Championships in Athletics (held in Doha from 28 September to 6 October 2019) guarantee a spot on their respective NOCs for the Olympics. The remaining half in each event are selected at the 2021 World Athletics Relays and according to World Athletics Top List as of 29 June 2021.

NOCs with more than three qualified athletes in an individual event may select, using their own rules, athletes from among those qualified. For example, the United States selects athletes based on the result of the 2020 United States Olympic Trials meet, but has a policy of entering every athlete qualified. Sweden only enters athletes good enough to reach at least the eighth position, based on an assessment by the Swedish NOC.

A tracking system of qualification is published by World Athletics: Road to 2020 Olympic Games. This Road to Tokyo tool shows which athletes – subject to being officially selected by their NOC – have qualified to compete. This tool identifies the first 3 qualifiers per country (in bold) but any athlete who has qualified, by Standard or Ranking, can be selected within the limit of 3 per nation. As this is a qualification monitoring tool, not an entry monitoring tool, it won't highlight which athletes have been officially selected by their NOC, but team announcements of many of the leading nations will be later published by World Athletics.

Some 1900 athletes, from more than 190 countries, will compete at the Olympic Games when the athletics will begin on 30 July.

The qualification period for all stadium events finished on 29 June and the qualification system has now been finalised, showing that about 70% of the athletes in individual events have qualified by entry standard and 30% by world ranking position, while 101 universality places have been awarded.

As already reported when the qualification closed for the longer road events, the men's and women's marathon exceeded their event quotas. This is also the case in the men's and women's 10,000m and the women's triple jump. No ranking place was necessary to complete the field in the men's shot put. But in those cases, regardless of the events’ quotas, any athlete with a qualification standard will still be eligible for selection to compete in Tokyo.

Sebastian Coe, president of World Athletics, said: "Olympic qualification processes are always a bit fraught because there's so much on the line for the athletes, but it's exciting to see the Olympic fields take shape as the Tokyo Games approach, and it's pleasing to see that the extended qualifying process we put in place when the Games were postponed last year ultimately allowed more athletes to reach the entry standards". "With Tokyo 2020 less than a month away, and this last milestone complete, anticipation is growing rapidly for what shapes as an extraordinary competition ahead, based on some of the performances we have seen this year. I'm delighted to see that more than 190 countries will be represented in athletics in Tokyo, reflecting the unmatched universality of our sport, and I look forward to seeing all those athletes competing at the Games from 30 July."

Athletes must have been born before 1 January 2006 (that, be at least 16 years old at the end of 2021) to compete. Youth athletes (born in 2004 or 2005, age 16 or 17 at the end of 2021) cannot compete in the throwing events, combined events, marathons, race walks, or 10,000 metre events. Junior athletes (born in 2002 or 2003, age 18 or 19 at the end of 2021) may compete in any event but cannot compete in the marathons or the 50 kilometre race walk.

The World Athletics Qualifying Standards are as follows:

| Men's and mixed events | | Women's events | |
| Event | Entry mark | Event | Entry mark |
|---|---|---|---|
| 100 m | 10.05 | 100 m | 11.15 |
| 200 m | 20.24 | 200 m | 22.80 |
| 400 m | 44.90 | 400 m | 51.35 |
| 800 m | 1:45.20 | 800 m | 1:59.50 |
| 1500 m | 3:35.00 | 1500 m | 4:04.20 |
| 5000 m | 13:13.50 | 5000 m | 15:10.00 |
| 10,000 m | 27:28.00 | 10,000 m | 31:25.00 |
| 110 m hurdles | 13.32 | 100 m hurdles | 12.84 |
| 400 m hurdles | 48.90 | 400 m hurdles | 55.40 |
| 3000 m steeplechase | 8:22.00 | 3000 m steeplechase | 9:30.00 |
| Marathon | 2:11:30 | Marathon | 2:29:30 |
| 20 km walk | 1:21:00 | 20 km walk | 1:31:00 |
| 50 km walk | 3:50:00 | —N/a | —N/a |
| Long jump | 8.22 | Long jump | 6.82 |
| Triple jump | 17.14 | Triple jump | 14.32 |
| High jump | 2.33 | High jump | 1.96 |
| Pole vault | 5.80 | Pole vault | 4.70 |
| Shot put | 21.10 | Shot put | 18.50 |
| Discus throw | 66.00 | Discus throw | 63.50 |
| Hammer throw | 77.50 | Hammer throw | 72.50 |
| Javelin throw | 85.00 | Javelin throw | 64.00 |
| Decathlon | 8350 | Heptathlon | 6420 |
| 4 × 100 m relay | Top 8 at WAC + Any unqualified nation that reaches the final of the 2021 World Athletics Relays + Next best from top lists up to maximum field of 16 teams | 4 × 100 m relay | Top 8 at WAC + Any unqualified nation that reaches the final of the 2021 World Athletics Relays + Next best from top lists up to maximum field of 16 teams |
| 4 × 400 m relay 4 × 400 metres relay (mixed) | Top 8 at WAC + Any unqualified nation that reaches the final of the 2021 World Athletics Relays + Next best from top lists up to maximum field of 16 teams | 4 × 400 m relay | Top 8 at WAC + Any unqualified nation that reaches the final of the 2021 World Athletics Relays + Next best from top lists up to maximum field of 16 teams |

== Track events ==
=== Men's track events ===
==== Men's 100 m ====
Does not include indoor achievements or races with wind above 2.0 m/s. Entry number: 56 (17 from ranking) + 28 Universality and 1 Invitational. Some sprinters, like Aaron Brown, have been withdrawn (see note #11).

| Qualification standard | No. of athletes | NOC | Nominated athletes |
|---|---|---|---|
| Entry standard – 10.05 | 3 | Great Britain | Zharnel Hughes; Reece Prescod; Chijindu Ujah |
| Entry standard – 10.05 | 3 | Jamaica | Yohan Blake; Oblique Seville; Tyquendo Tracey |
| Entry standard – 10.05 | 3 | Japan | Yuki Koike; Shuhei Tada; Ryota Yamagata |
| Entry standard – 10.05 | 3 | Nigeria | Enoch Adegoke; Usheoritse Itsekiri; Divine Oduduru |
| Entry standard – 10.05 | 3 | South Africa | Gift Leotlela; Shaun Maswanganyi; Akani Simbine |
| Entry standard – 10.05 | 3 | United States | Ronnie Baker; Trayvon Bromell; Fred Kerley |
| Entry standard – 10.05 | 1 | Canada | Andre De Grasse; ~~Aaron Brown~~ |
| Entry standard – 10.05 | 2 | China | Su Bingtian; Xie Zhenye |
| Entry standard – 10.05 | 1 | Ghana | ~~Joseph Amoah~~; Benjamin Azamati-Kwaku |
| Entry standard – 10.05 | 1 | Kenya | ~~Mark Odhiambo~~; Ferdinand Omurwa |
| Entry standard – 10.05 | 1 | Antigua and Barbuda | Cejhae Greene |
| Entry standard – 10.05 | 1 | Australia | Rohan Browning |
| Entry standard – 10.05 | 1 | Bahamas | Samson Colebrooke |
| Entry standard – 10.05 | 1 | Barbados | Mario Burke |
| Entry standard – 10.05 | 1 | Brazil | Paulo André de Oliveira |
| Entry standard – 10.05 | 1 | Cayman Islands | Kemar Hyman |
| Entry standard – 10.05 | 1 | France | Jimmy Vicaut |
| Entry standard – 10.05 | 1 | Indonesia | Lalu Muhammad Zohri |
| Entry standard – 10.05 | 1 | Iran | Hassan Taftian |
| Entry standard – 10.05 | 1 | Italy | Marcell Jacobs |
| Entry standard – 10.05 | 1 | Ivory Coast | Arthur Cissé |
| Entry standard – 10.05 | 1 | Liberia | Emmanuel Matadi |
| Entry standard – 10.05 | 1 | Qatar | Femi Ogunode |
| Entry standard – 10.05 | 1 | Saint Kitts and Nevis | Jason Rogers |
World ranking
| World ranking | 2 | Brazil | Felipe Bardi dos Santos; Rodrigo do Nascimento |
| World ranking | 2 | Canada | Bismark Boateng; Gavin Smellie |
| World ranking | 1 | Switzerland | Silvan Wicki; ~~Alex Wilson~~ |
| World ranking | 2 | Turkey | Emre Zafer Barnes; Jak Ali Harvey |
| World ranking | 1 | China | Wu Zhiqiang |
| World ranking | 1 | Chinese Taipei | Yang Chun-han |
| World ranking | 1 | Denmark | Kojo Musah |
| World ranking | 0 | France | ~~Mouhamadou Fall~~ |
| World ranking | 1 | Italy | Filippo Tortu |
| World ranking | 0 | Panama | ~~Alonso Edward~~ |
| World ranking | 1 | Portugal | Carlos Nascimento |
| World ranking | 1 | Slovakia | Ján Volko |
| World ranking | 1 | Sri Lanka | Yupun Abeykoon |
| Universality Places | 1 | Afghanistan | Sha Mahmood Noor Zahi |
| Universality Places | 1 | Angola | Aveni Miguel |
| Universality Places | 1 | American Samoa | Nathan Crumpton |
| Universality Places | 1 | Belize | Shaun Gill |
| Universality Places | 1 | Benin | Didier Kiki |
| Universality Places | 1 | Bolivia | Bruno Rojas |
| Universality Places | 1 | Cambodia | Pen Sokong |
| Universality Places | 1 | Democratic Republic of the Congo | Oliver Mwimba |
| Universality Places | 1 | Federated States of Micronesia | Scott Fiti |
| Universality Places | 1 | Fiji | Banuve Tabakaucoro |
| Universality Places | 1 | Gabon | Guy Maganga Gorra |
| Universality Places | 1 | The Gambia | Ebrima Camara |
| Universality Places | 1 | Guinea-Bissau | Seco Camara |
| Universality Places | 1 | Guyana | Emanuel Archibald |
| Universality Places | 1 | Kiribati | Lataisi Mwea |
| Universality Places | 1 | Maldives | Hassan Saaid |
| Universality Places | 1 | Nauru | Jonah Harris |
| Universality Places | 1 | Nicaragua | Yeykell Romero |
| Universality Places | 1 | Niger | Badamassi Saguirou |
| Universality Places | 1 | Oman | Barakat Al-Harthi |
| Universality Places | 1 | Palau | Adrian Ililau |
| Universality Places | 1 | Tajikistan | Ildar Akhmadiev |
| Universality Places | 1 | Togo | Fabrice Dabla |
| Universality Places | 1 | Tonga | Ronald Fotofili |
| Universality Places | 1 | Tuvalu | Karalo Maibuca |
| Universality Places | 1 | United Arab Emirates | Mohamed Alhammadi |
| Universality Places | 1 | Zimbabwe | Ngoni Makusha |
| Invitational Places | 1 | Refugee Olympic Team | Dorian Keletela |
| Total | 79 | | |

==== Men's 200 m ====
Entry number: 56. Withdrawn after qualification by standard or ranking: Miguel Francis, Benjamin Azamati-Kwaku, Zharnel Hughes, Christophe Lemaitre, Mouhamadou Fall, Paulo André de Oliveira, Felipe Bardi dos Santos, Méba-Mickaël Zeze, Jeffrey John.

| Qualification standard | No. of athletes | NOC | Nominated athletes |
|---|---|---|---|
| Entry standard – 20.24 | 1 | Great Britain | ~~Miguel Francis~~; Adam Gemili; ~~Zharnel Hughes~~ |
| Entry standard – 20.24 | 3 | United States | Kenny Bednarek; Erriyon Knighton; Noah Lyles |
| Entry standard – 20.24 | 2 | Canada | Aaron Brown; Andre De Grasse |
| Entry standard – 20.24 | 1 | Ghana | Joseph Amoah; ~~Benjamin Azamati-Kwaku~~ |
| Entry standard – 20.24 | 2 | Jamaica | Rasheed Dwyer; Julian Forte |
| Entry standard – 20.24 | 2 | South Africa | Shaun Maswanganyi; Clarence Munyai |
| Entry standard – 20.24 | 2 | Trinidad and Tobago | Kyle Greaux; Jereem Richards |
| Entry standard – 20.24 | 0 | Bahamas | ~~Steven Gardiner~~ |
| Entry standard – 20.24 | 0 | Barbados | ~~Mario Burke~~ |
| Entry standard – 20.24 | 0 | Botswana | ~~Isaac Makwala~~ |
| Entry standard – 20.24 | 1 | Brazil | Aldemir da Silva Júnior |
| Entry standard – 20.24 | 1 | China | Xie Zhenye |
| Entry standard – 20.24 | 1 | Colombia | Bernardo Baloyes |
| Entry standard – 20.24 | 1 | Dominican Republic | Yancarlos Martínez |
| Entry standard – 20.24 | 0 | Ecuador | ~~Álex Quiñónez~~ |
| Entry standard – 20.24 | 1 | Japan | Abdul Hakim Sani Brown |
| Entry standard – 20.24 | 1 | Liberia | Joseph Fahnbulleh |
| Entry standard – 20.24 | 1 | Nigeria | Divine Oduduru |
| Entry standard – 20.24 | 1 | Panama | Alonso Edward |
| Entry standard – 20.24 | 1 | Qatar | Femi Ogunode |
| Entry standard – 20.24 | 0 | Switzerland | ~~Alex Wilson~~ |
| Entry standard – 20.24 | 1 | Turkey | Ramil Guliyev |
| Entry standard – 20.24 | 1 | Zambia | Sydney Siame |
| World ranking | 2 | Brazil | Jorge Vides; Lucas Vilar |
| World ranking | 2 | Ireland | Marcus Lawler; Leon Reid |
| World ranking | 2 | Italy | Fausto Desalu; Antonio Infantino |
| World ranking | 2 | Japan | Shota Iizuka; Jun Yamashita |
| World ranking | 1 | Belgium | Robin Vanderbemden |
| World ranking | 1 | Canada | Brendon Rodney |
| World ranking | 1 | Czech Republic | Jan Jirka |
| World ranking | 1 | Germany | Steven Müller |
| World ranking | 1 | Great Britain | Nethaneel Mitchell-Blake |
| World ranking | 1 | Liberia | Emmanuel Matadi |
| World ranking | 1 | Lithuania | Gediminas Truskauskas |
| World ranking | 1 | Netherlands | Taymir Burnet |
| World ranking | 1 | Slovakia | Ján Volko |
| World ranking | 1 | South Africa | Anaso Jobodwana |
| World ranking | 1 | Switzerland | William Reais |
| World ranking | 1 | Ukraine | Serhiy Smelyk |
| Universality Places | 1 | Brunei | Muhd Noor Firdaus Ar-Rasyid |
| Universality Places | 1 | Cameroon | Emmanuel Eseme |
| Universality Places | 1 | El Salvador | José Andrés Salazar |
| Universality Places | 1 | Eswatini | Sibusiso Matsenjwa |
| Universality Places | 1 | Lebanon | Noureddine Hadid |
| Universality Places | 1 | Mali | Fodé Sissoko |
| Total | 50 | | |

==== Men's 400 m ====
Entry number: 48.

| Qualification standard | No. of athletes | NOC | Nominated athletes |
|---|---|---|---|
| Entry standard – 44.90 | 3 | United States | Michael Cherry; Michael Norman; Randolph Ross |
| Entry standard – 44.90 | 2 | Jamaica | Nathon Allen; Demish Gaye |
| Entry standard – 44.90 | 2 | Trinidad and Tobago | Machel Cedenio; Dwight St. Hillaire |
| Entry standard – 44.90 | 1 | Bahamas | Steven Gardiner |
| Entry standard – 44.90 | 0 | Bahrain | ~~Abbas Abubakar Abbas~~ |
| Entry standard – 44.90 | 1 | Barbados | Jonathan Jones |
| Entry standard – 44.90 | 1 | Botswana | Isaac Makwala |
| Entry standard – 44.90 | 1 | Colombia | Anthony Zambrano |
| Entry standard – 44.90 | 1 | Grenada | Kirani James |
| Entry standard – 44.90 | 1 | Italy | Davide Re |
| Entry standard – 44.90 | 1 | Kenya | Emmanuel Korir |
| Entry standard – 44.90 | 1 | South Africa | Wayde van Niekerk |
| World ranking | 2 | Australia | Alex Beck; Steven Solomon |
| World ranking | 2 | Belgium | Kevin Borlée; Jonathan Sacoor |
| World ranking | 2 | Netherlands | Liemarvin Bonevacia; Jochem Dobber |
| World ranking | 2 | South Africa | Zakithi Nene; Thapelo Phora |
| World ranking | 1 | Bahamas | Alonzo Russell |
| World ranking | 1 | Botswana | Leungo Scotch |
| World ranking | 1 | Brazil | Lucas Carvalho |
| World ranking | 1 | Colombia | Jhon Perlaza |
| World ranking | 1 | Czech Republic | Pavel Maslák |
| World ranking | 1 | Germany | Marvin Schlegel |
| World ranking | 1 | Italy | Edoardo Scotti |
| World ranking | 1 | Jamaica | Christopher Taylor |
| World ranking | 1 | Japan | Julian Walsh |
| World ranking | 1 | Kazakhstan | Mikhail Litvin |
| World ranking | 1 | Poland | Karol Zalewski |
| World ranking | 1 | Portugal | Ricardo dos Santos |
| World ranking | 1 | Saudi Arabia | Mazen Al-Yassin |
| World ranking | 1 | Slovenia | Luka Janežič |
| World ranking | 1 | Spain | Óscar Husillos |
| World ranking | 1 | Switzerland | Ricky Petrucciani |
| World ranking | 1 | Trinidad and Tobago | Deon Lendore |
| Universality Places | 1 | Bangladesh | Mohammad Jahir Rayhan |
| Universality Places | 1 | Chad | Bachir Mahamat |
| Universality Places | 1 | Iraq | Taha Hussein Yaseen |
| Universality Places | 1 | Madagascar | Todisoa Rabearison |
| Universality Places | 1 | North Macedonia | Jovan Stojoski |
| Universality Places | 1 | Republic of the Congo | Gilles Anthony Afoumba |
| Universality Places | 1 | Sudan | Sadam Koumi |
| Universality Places | 1 | Yemen | Ahmed Al-Yaari |
| Total | 48 | | |

==== Men's 800 m ====
Entry number: 48. No qualified by ranking.

| Qualification standard | No. of athletes | NOC | Nominated athletes |
|---|---|---|---|
Entry standard – 1:45.20
| Entry standard – 1:45.20 | 3 | Australia | Peter Bol; Charlie Hunter; Jeff Riseley |
| Entry standard – 1:45.20 | 3 | France | Pierre-Ambroise Bosse; Benjamin Robert; Gabriel Tual |
| Entry standard – 1:45.20 | 3 | Great Britain | Oliver Dustin; Elliot Giles; Daniel Rowden |
| Entry standard – 1:45.20 | 3 | Kenya | Emmanuel Korir; Ferguson Rotich; Michael Saruni |
| Entry standard – 1:45.20 | 3 | Morocco | Abdelati El Guesse; Oussama Nabil; Mostafa Smaili |
| Entry standard – 1:45.20 | 2 | Poland | Mateusz Borkowski; Patryk Dobek; ~~Marcin Lewandowski~~ |
| Entry standard – 1:45.20 | 3 | Puerto Rico | Andrés Arroyo; Ryan Sánchez; Wesley Vázquez |
| Entry standard – 1:45.20 | 3 | Spain | Adrián Ben; Saúl Ordóñez; Pablo Sánchez-Valladares |
| Entry standard – 1:45.20 | 3 | United States | Bryce Hoppel; Isaiah Jewett; Clayton Murphy |
| Entry standard – 1:45.20 | 1 | Algeria | Yassine Hethat; ~~Djamel Sejati~~ |
| Entry standard – 1:45.20 | 2 | Canada | Marco Arop; Brandon McBride |
| Entry standard – 1:45.20 | 1 | Ethiopia | ~~Teddese Lemi~~; Melese Nberet |
| Entry standard – 1:45.20 | 1 | Belgium | Eliott Crestan |
| Entry standard – 1:45.20 | 1 | Bosnia and Herzegovina | Amel Tuka |
| Entry standard – 1:45.20 | 1 | Botswana | Nijel Amos |
| Entry standard – 1:45.20 | 1 | Brazil | Thiago André |
| Entry standard – 1:45.20 | 1 | Burundi | Éric Nzikwinkunda |
| Entry standard – 1:45.20 | 1 | Djibouti | Ayanleh Souleiman |
| Entry standard – 1:45.20 | 1 | Ireland | Mark English |
| Entry standard – 1:45.20 | 1 | Mexico | Jesús Tonatiú López |
| Entry standard – 1:45.20 | 1 | Netherlands | Tony van Diepen |
| Entry standard – 1:45.20 | 1 | Qatar | Abubaker Haydar Abdalla |
| Entry standard – 1:45.20 | 1 | Sweden | Andreas Kramer |
| Entry standard – 1:45.20 | 1 | Tunisia | Abdessalem Ayouni |
| World ranking | 0 | | |
| Universality Places | 1 | Andorra | Pol Moya |
| Universality Places | 1 | Central African Republic | Francky Mbotto |
| Universality Places | 1 | Cook Islands | Alex Beddoes |
| Universality Places | 1 | Dominica | Dennick Luke |
| Universality Places | 1 | Kosovo | Musa Hajdari |
| Invitational Places | 1 | Refugee Olympic Team | James Chiengjiek |
| Total | 48 | | |

==== Men's 1500 m ====
Entry number: 45.

| Qualification standard | No. of athletes | NOC | Nominated athletes |
|---|---|---|---|
| Entry standard – 3:35.00 | 3 | Australia | Jye Edwards; Ollie Hoare; Stewart McSweyn |
| Entry standard – 3:35.00 | 3 | Ethiopia | Samuel Abate; Teddese Lemi; Samuel Tefera |
| Entry standard – 3:35.00 | 3 | France | Azeddine Habz; Alexis Miellet; Baptiste Mischler |
| Entry standard – 3:35.00 | 3 | Great Britain | Jake Heyward; Josh Kerr; Jake Wightman |
| Entry standard – 3:35.00 | 3 | Kenya | Timothy Cheruiyot; Abel Kipsang; Charles Simotwo |
| Entry standard – 3:35.00 | 3 | Morocco | Soufiane El Bakkali; Anass Essayi; Abdelatif Sadiki |
| Entry standard – 3:35.00 | 2 | Norway | Filip Ingebrigtsen; Jakob Ingebrigtsen |
| Entry standard – 3:35.00 | 2 | Poland | Marcin Lewandowski; Michał Rozmys |
| Entry standard – 3:35.00 | 2 | Qatar | Abdirahman Saeed Hassan; Adam Ali Musab |
| Entry standard – 3:35.00 | 2 | Spain | Ignacio Fontes; Adel Mechaal |
| Entry standard – 3:35.00 | 2 | United States | Matthew Centrowitz; Yared Nuguse |
| Entry standard – 3:35.00 | 0 | Algeria | ~~Taoufik Makhloufi~~ |
| Entry standard – 3:35.00 | 1 | Bahrain | Sadik Mikhou |
| Entry standard – 3:35.00 | 1 | Belgium | Ismael Debjani |
| Entry standard – 3:35.00 | 0 | Canada | ~~Justyn Knight~~ |
| Entry standard – 3:35.00 | 1 | Djibouti | Ayanleh Souleiman |
| Entry standard – 3:35.00 | 1 | Germany | Robert Farken |
| Entry standard – 3:35.00 | 1 | New Zealand | Sam Tanner |
| Entry standard – 3:35.00 | 0 | ROC | ~~Vladimir Nikitin~~ |
| Entry standard – 3:35.00 | 1 | Sweden | Kalle Berglund |
| Entry standard – 3:35.00 | 1 | Uganda | Ronald Musagala |
| World ranking | 1 | Brazil | Thiago André |
| World ranking | 1 | Germany | Amos Bartelsmeyer |
| World ranking | 1 | Hungary | István Szögi |
| World ranking | 1 | Ireland | Andrew Coscoran |
| World ranking | 1 | Luxembourg | Charles Grethen |
| World ranking | 1 | New Zealand | Nick Willis |
| World ranking | 1 | Spain | Jesús Gómez |
| World ranking | 1 | United States | Cole Hocker |
| Universality Places | 1 | Timor-Leste | Felisberto de Deus |
| Universality Places | 1 | Equatorial Guinea | Benjamín Enzema |
| Universality Places | 1 | Somalia | Ali Idow Hassan |
| Universality Places | 1 | South Sudan | Abraham Guem |
| Invitational Places | 1 | Refugee Olympic Team | Paulo Amotun Lokoro |
| Total | 48 | | |

==== Men's 5000 m ====
Entry number: 42.

| Qualification standard | No. of athletes | NOC | Nominated athletes |
|---|---|---|---|
| Entry standard – 13:13.50 | 2 | Australia | David McNeill; ~~Stewart McSweyn~~; Patrick Tiernan |
| Entry standard – 13:13.50 | 3 | Canada | Mohammed Ahmed; Luc Bruchet; Justyn Knight |
| Entry standard – 13:13.50 | 3 | Ethiopia | Nibret Melak; Milkesa Mengesha; Getnet Wale |
| Entry standard – 13:13.50 | 3 | Kenya | Samuel Chebole; Daniel Ebenyo; Nicholas Kimeli |
| Entry standard – 13:13.50 | 3 | Uganda | Oscar Chelimo; Joshua Cheptegei; Jacob Kiplimo |
| Entry standard – 13:13.50 | 3 | United States | Paul Chelimo; Grant Fisher; Woody Kincaid |
| Entry standard – 13:13.50 | 2 | Bahrain | Birhanu Balew; Dawit Fikadu |
| Entry standard – 13:13.50 | 2 | France | Jimmy Gressier; Hugo Hay |
| Entry standard – 13:13.50 | 2 | Great Britain | Andrew Butchart; Marc Scott |
| Entry standard – 13:13.50 | 0 | Norway | ~~Filip Ingebrigtsen~~; ~~Jakob Ingebrigtsen~~ |
| Entry standard – 13:13.50 | 1 | Belgium | Isaac Kimeli |
| Entry standard – 13:13.50 | 1 | Guatemala | Luis Grijalva |
| Entry standard – 13:13.50 | 1 | Italy | Yemaneberhan Crippa |
| Entry standard – 13:13.50 | 1 | South Africa | Lesiba Precious Mashele |
| Entry standard – 13:13.50 | 1 | Spain | Mohamed Katir |
| World ranking | 2 | Japan | Yuta Bando; Hiroki Matsueda |
| World ranking | 1 | Morocco | Soufiyan Bouqantar; ~~Zouhair Talbi~~ |
| World ranking | 1 | Switzerland | Jonas Raess; ~~Julien Wanders~~ |
| World ranking | 1 | Australia | Morgan McDonald |
| World ranking | 1 | Belgium | Robin Hendrix |
| World ranking | 1 | Germany | Mohamed Mohumed |
| World ranking | 1 | Netherlands | Mike Foppen |
| World ranking | 1 | Norway | Narve Gilje Nordås |
| World ranking | 0 | Spain | ~~Carlos Mayo~~ |
| Universality Places | 1 | Kyrgyzstan | Nursultan Keneshbekov |
| Universality Places | 1 | Mauritania | Abidine Abidine |
| Invitational Places | 1 | Refugee Olympic Team | Jamal Abdelmaji Eisa Mohammed |
| Total | 40 | | |

==== Men's 10,000 m ====
Entry number: initial target of 27. 28 runners, one more, originally qualified by entry standard. However, two athletes withdrew, reducing the field to 26 athletes.

| Qualification standard | No. of athletes | NOC | Nominated athletes |
|---|---|---|---|
| Entry standard – 27:28.00 | 3 | Ethiopia | Berihu Aregawi; Selemon Barega; Yomif Kejelcha |
| Entry standard – 27:28.00 | 3 | Kenya | Rhonex Kipruto; Rodgers Kwemoi; Weldon Langat |
| Entry standard – 27:28.00 | 3 | Uganda | Joshua Cheptegei; Jacob Kiplimo; Stephen Kissa |
| Entry standard – 27:28.00 | 3 | United States | Grant Fisher; Woody Kincaid; Joe Klecker |
| Entry standard – 27:28.00 | 1 | Australia | ~~Stewart McSweyn~~; Patrick Tiernan |
| Entry standard – 27:28.00 | 1 | Belgium | ~~Bashir Abdi~~; Isaac Kimeli |
| Entry standard – 27:28.00 | 2 | Great Britain | Sam Atkin; Marc Scott |
| Entry standard – 27:28.00 | 2 | Japan | Akira Aizawa; Tatsuhiko Ito |
| Entry standard – 27:28.00 | 0 | Bahrain | ~~Birhanu Balew~~ |
| Entry standard – 27:28.00 | 1 | Canada | Mohammed Ahmed |
| Entry standard – 27:28.00 | 1 | Eritrea | Aron Kifle |
| Entry standard – 27:28.00 | 1 | France | Morhad Amdouni |
| Entry standard – 27:28.00 | 1 | Italy | Yemaneberhan Crippa |
| Entry standard – 27:28.00 | 0 | Morocco | ~~Zouhair Talbi~~ |
| Entry standard – 27:28.00 | 0 | Norway | ~~Sondre Nordstad Moen~~ |
| Entry standard – 27:28.00 | 1 | Spain | Carlos Mayo |
| Entry standard – 27:28.00 | 1 | Switzerland | Julien Wanders |
| Entry standard – 27:28.00 | 1 | Thailand | Kieran Tuntivate |
| World ranking | 0 | | |
| Total | 25 | | |

==== Men's 110 m hurdles ====
Do not include indoor achievements. Entry number: 40.

| Qualification standard | No. of athletes | NOC | Nominated athletes |
|---|---|---|---|
| Entry standard – 13.32 | 3 | France | Wilhem Belocian; Aurel Manga; Pascal Martinot-Lagarde |
| Entry standard – 13.32 | 3 | Jamaica | Ronald Levy; Hansle Parchment; Damion Thomas |
| Entry standard – 13.32 | 3 | Japan | Shunsuke Izumiya; Taio Kanai; Shunya Takayama |
| Entry standard – 13.32 | 3 | United States | Devon Allen; Grant Holloway; Daniel Roberts |
| Entry standard – 13.32 | 2 | Brazil | Gabriel Constantino; Eduardo de Deus |
| Entry standard – 13.32 | 2 | Spain | Asier Martínez; Orlando Ortega |
| Entry standard – 13.32 | 1 | Barbados | Shane Brathwaite |
| Entry standard – 13.32 | 1 | Belarus | Vitali Parakhonka |
| Entry standard – 13.32 | 1 | Belgium | Michael Obasuyi |
| Entry standard – 13.32 | 1 | China | Xie Wenjun |
| Entry standard – 13.32 | 1 | Cyprus | Milan Trajkovic |
| Entry standard – 13.32 | 1 | Finland | Elmo Lakka |
| Entry standard – 13.32 | 1 | Great Britain | Andrew Pozzi |
| Entry standard – 13.32 | 1 | Italy | Paolo Dal Molin |
| Entry standard – 13.32 | 1 | ROC | Sergey Shubenkov |
| Entry standard – 13.32 | 1 | South Africa | Antonio Alkana |
| World ranking | 1 | Australia | Nicholas Hough |
| World ranking | 1 | Brazil | Rafael Henrique Pereira |
| World ranking | 1 | Chinese Taipei | Chen Kuei-ru |
| World ranking | 1 | Germany | Gregor Traber |
| World ranking | 1 | Great Britain | David King |
| World ranking | 1 | Greece | Konstantinos Douvalidis |
| World ranking | 1 | Hungary | Valdó Szűcs |
| World ranking | 1 | Italy | Hassane Fofana |
| World ranking | 1 | Kuwait | Yaqoub Al-Youha |
| World ranking | 1 | Poland | Damian Czykier |
| World ranking | 1 | Switzerland | Jason Joseph |
| Universality Places | 1 | Comoros | Fadane Hamadi |
| Universality Places | 1 | Hong Kong | Chan Chung Wang |
| Universality Places | 1 | Mauritius | Jérémie Lararaudeuse |
| Universality Places | 1 | Senegal | Louis François Mendy |
| Universality Places | 1 | Virgin Islands | Eddie Lovett |
| Total | 42 | | |

==== Men's 400 m hurdles ====
Entry number: 40.

| Qualification standard | No. of athletes | NOC | Nominated athletes |
|---|---|---|---|
| Entry standard – 48.90 | 3 | Japan | Takatoshi Abe; Kazuki Kurokawa; Hiromu Yamauchi |
| Entry standard – 48.90 | 3 | United States | Rai Benjamin; David Kendziera; Kenny Selmon |
| Entry standard – 48.90 | 2 | Brazil | Alison dos Santos; Márcio Teles |
| Entry standard – 48.90 | 2 | Jamaica | Jaheel Hyde; Kemar Mowatt |
| Entry standard – 48.90 | 1 | Algeria | Abdelmalik Lahoulou |
| Entry standard – 48.90 | 1 | British Virgin Islands | Kyron McMaster |
| Entry standard – 48.90 | 1 | Estonia | Rasmus Mägi |
| Entry standard – 48.90 | 1 | France | Ludvy Vaillant |
| Entry standard – 48.90 | 1 | Germany | Constantin Preis |
| Entry standard – 48.90 | 1 | Ireland | Thomas Barr |
| Entry standard – 48.90 | 0 | Kenya | ~~Moitalel Naadokila~~ |
| Entry standard – 48.90 | 1 | Norway | Karsten Warholm |
| Entry standard – 48.90 | 0 | Poland | ~~Patryk Dobek~~ |
| Entry standard – 48.90 | 1 | Qatar | Abderrahman Samba |
| Entry standard – 48.90 | 1 | South Africa | Sokwakhana Zazini |
| Entry standard – 48.90 | 0 | Switzerland | ~~Kariem Hussein~~ |
| Entry standard – 48.90 | 1 | Turkey | Yasmani Copello |
| World ranking | 2 | Germany | Joshua Abuaku; Luke Campbell |
| World ranking | 1 | Chinese Taipei | Chen Chieh |
| World ranking | 1 | Costa Rica | Gerald Drummond |
| World ranking | 1 | Czech Republic | Vít Müller |
| World ranking | 1 | France | Wilfried Happio |
| World ranking | 1 | Hungary | Máté Koroknai |
| World ranking | 1 | India | M. P. Jabir |
| World ranking | 0 | Iran | ~~Mahdi Pirjahan~~ |
| World ranking | 1 | Italy | Alessandro Sibilio |
| World ranking | 1 | Jamaica | Shawn Rowe |
| World ranking | 1 | Netherlands | ~~Ramsey Angela~~; Nick Smidt |
| World ranking | 1 | Spain | Sergio Fernández |
| World ranking | 1 | Tunisia | Mohamed Touati |
| Universality Places | 1 | Cape Verde | Jordin Andrade |
| Universality Places | 1 | Mozambique | Creve Armando Machava |
| Universality Places | 1 | Seychelles | Ned Justeen Azemia |
| Total | 36 | | |

==== Men's 3000 m steeplechase ====
Entry number: 45.

| Qualification standard | No. of athletes | NOC | Nominated athletes |
|---|---|---|---|
| Entry standard – 8:22.00 | 3 | Ethiopia | Lamecha Girma; Bikila Tadese Takele; Getnet Wale |
| Entry standard – 8:22.00 | 3 | France | Djilali Bedrani; Louis Gilavert; Alexis Phelut |
| Entry standard – 8:22.00 | 3 | Italy | Ahmed Abdelwahed; Ala Zoghlami; Osama Zoghlami |
| Entry standard – 8:22.00 | 3 | Japan | Ryoma Aoki; Ryuji Miura; Kosei Yamaguchi |
| Entry standard – 8:22.00 | 3 | Kenya | Leonard Bett; Abraham Kibiwot; Benjamin Kigen |
| Entry standard – 8:22.00 | 3 | Morocco | Abdelkarim Ben Zahra; Soufiane El Bakkali; Mohamed Tindouft |
| Entry standard – 8:22.00 | 3 | Spain | Daniel Arce; Fernando Carro; Sebastián Martos |
| Entry standard – 8:22.00 | 3 | Sweden | Emil Blomberg; Vidar Johansson; Simon Sundström |
| Entry standard – 8:22.00 | 3 | United States | Hillary Bor; Mason Ferlic; Benard Keter |
| Entry standard – 8:22.00 | 1 | Algeria | Hicham Bouchicha; ~~Bilal Tabti~~ |
| Entry standard – 8:22.00 | 2 | Canada | John Gay; Matthew Hughes |
| Entry standard – 8:22.00 | 2 | Great Britain | Phil Norman; Zak Seddon |
| Entry standard – 8:22.00 | 1 | Australia | Edward Trippas |
| Entry standard – 8:22.00 | 1 | Bahrain | John Kibet Koech |
| Entry standard – 8:22.00 | 1 | Denmark | Ole Hesselbjerg |
| Entry standard – 8:22.00 | 1 | Eritrea | Yemane Haileselassie |
| Entry standard – 8:22.00 | 1 | Finland | Topi Raitanen |
| Entry standard – 8:22.00 | 1 | India | Avinash Sable |
| Entry standard – 8:22.00 | 1 | Uganda | Albert Chemutai |
| World ranking | 2 | Australia | Ben Buckingham; Matthew Clarke |
| World ranking | 1 | Brazil | Altobeli da Silva |
| World ranking | 1 | Colombia | Carlos San Martín |
| World ranking | 1 | Germany | Karl Bebendorf |
| Total | 44 | | |

=== Women's track events ===
==== Women's 100 m ====
Does not include indoor achievements.

| Qualification standard | No. of athletes | NOC | Nominated athletes |
|---|---|---|---|
| Entry standard – 11.15 | 3 | China | Ge Manqi; Liang Xiaojing; Wei Yongli |
| Entry standard – 11.15 | 2 | Germany | Alexandra Burghardt; ~~Lisa Mayer~~; Tatjana Pinto |
| Entry standard – 11.15 | 3 | Great Britain | Dina Asher-Smith; Daryll Neita; Asha Philip |
| Entry standard – 11.15 | 3 | Jamaica | Shelly-Ann Fraser-Pryce; Shericka Jackson; Elaine Thompson Herah |
| Entry standard – 11.15 | 3 | Switzerland | Ajla Del Ponte; Mujinga Kambundji; Salomé Kora |
| Entry standard – 11.15 | 3 | United States | Teahna Daniels; Javianne Oliver; Jenna Prandini |
| Entry standard – 11.15 | 2 | Ivory Coast | Murielle Ahouré; Marie-Josée Ta Lou |
| Entry standard – 11.15 | 1 | Netherlands | ~~Dafne Schippers~~; Marije van Hunenstijn |
| Entry standard – 11.15 | 2 | Nigeria | Nzubechi Grace Nwokocha; Blessing Okagbare |
| Entry standard – 11.15 | 2 | Trinidad and Tobago | Michelle-Lee Ahye; Kelly-Ann Baptiste |
| Entry standard – 11.15 | 1 | Bahamas | Tynia Gaither |
| Entry standard – 11.15 | 1 | Barbados | Tristan Evelyn |
| Entry standard – 11.15 | 0 | Bulgaria | ~~Ivet Lalova-Collio~~ |
| Entry standard – 11.15 | 1 | Canada | Crystal Emmanuel |
| Entry standard – 11.15 | 1 | The Gambia | Gina Bass |
| Entry standard – 11.15 | 0 | Poland | ~~Ewa Swoboda~~ |
| Entry standard – 11.15 | 1 | Portugal | Lorène Bazolo |
| Entry standard – 11.15 | 0 | South Africa | ~~Carina Horn~~ |
| Entry standard – 11.15 | 1 | Zambia | Rhodah Njobvu |
| World ranking | 2 | Brazil | Vitória Cristina Rosa; Rosângela Santos |
| World ranking | 2 | Italy | Anna Bongiorni; Vittoria Fontana |
| World ranking | 1 | Australia | Hana Basic |
| World ranking | 1 | Belarus | Krystsina Tsimanouskaya |
| World ranking | 1 | Bulgaria | Inna Eftimova |
| World ranking | 1 | Canada | Khamica Bingham |
| World ranking | 1 | Ecuador | Ángela Tenorio |
| World ranking | 0 | Egypt | ~~Bassant Hemida~~ |
| World ranking | 0 | Finland | ~~Lotta Kemppinen~~ |
| World ranking | 1 | Greece | Rafaéla Spanoudaki-Hatziriga |
| World ranking | 1 | Guyana | Jasmine Abrams |
| World ranking | 1 | India | Dutee Chand |
| World ranking | 1 | Israel | Diana Vaisman |
| World ranking | 0 | Kazakhstan | ~~Olga Safronova~~ |
| World ranking | 0 | Netherlands | ~~Jamile Samuel~~ |
| World ranking | 0 | Nigeria | ~~Rosemary Chukwuma~~ |
| World ranking | 0 | Poland | ~~Pia Skrzyszowska~~ |
| World ranking | 1 | Slovenia | Maja Mihalinec Zidar |
| World ranking | 1 | Spain | María Isabel Pérez |
| Universality places | 1 | Afghanistan | Kamia Yousufi |
| Universality places | 1 | Antigua and Barbuda | Joella Lloyd |
| Universality places | 1 | Chinese Taipei | Hsieh Hsi-en |
| Universality places | 1 | Comoros | Amed Elna |
| Universality places | 1 | Equatorial Guinea | Alba Mbo Nchama |
| Universality places | 1 | Guam | Regine Tugade |
| Universality places | 1 | Guinea | Aïssata Deen Conte |
| Universality places | 1 | Indonesia | Alvin Tehupeiory |
| Universality places | 1 | Iran | Farzaneh Fasihi |
| Universality places | 1 | Kuwait | Mudhawi Al-Shammari |
| Universality places | 1 | Laos | Silina Pha Aphay |
| Universality places | 1 | Libya | Hadel Aboud |
| Universality places | 1 | Malawi | Asimenye Simwaka |
| Universality places | 1 | Malaysia | Azreen Nabila Alias |
| Universality places | 1 | Mali | Djenebou Dante |
| Universality places | 1 | Malta | Carla Scicluna |
| Universality places | 1 | Mauritania | Houlèye Ba |
| Universality places | 1 | Monaco | Charlotte Afriat |
| Universality places | 1 | Nepal | Sarswati Chaudhary |
| Universality places | 1 | Oman | Mazoon Al-Alawi |
| Universality places | 1 | Palestine | Hanna Barakat |
| Universality places | 1 | Qatar | Bashair Obaid Al-Manwari |
| Universality places | 1 | Republic of the Congo | Natacha Ngoye Akamabi |
| Universality places | 1 | Saint Kitts and Nevis | Amya Clarke |
| Universality places | 1 | Saudi Arabia | Yasmeen Al-Dabbagh |
| Universality places | 1 | Sierra Leone | Maggie Barrie |
| Universality places | 1 | Tuvalu | Matie Stanley |
| Total | 45+27 | | |

==== Women's 200 m ====
| Qualification standard | No. of athletes | NOC | Nominated athletes |
|---|---|---|---|
| Entry standard – 22.80 | 2 | Bahamas | ~~Brianne Bethel~~; ~~Tynia Gaither~~; Shaunae Miller-Uibo; Anthonique Strachan |
| Entry standard – 22.80 | 1 | Great Britain | ~~Dina Asher-Smith~~; Beth Dobbin; ~~Jodie Williams~~ |
| Entry standard – 22.80 | 3 | Jamaica | Shelly-Ann Fraser-Pryce; Shericka Jackson; Elaine Thompson Herah |
| Entry standard – 22.80 | 1 | Nigeria | Nzubechi Grace Nwokocha; ~~Favour Ofili~~; ~~Blessing Okagbare~~ |
| Entry standard – 22.80 | 3 | United States | Anavia Battle; Jenna Prandini; Gabrielle Thomas |
| Entry standard – 22.80 | 2 | Namibia | Beatrice Masilingi; Christine Mboma |
| Entry standard – 22.80 | 1 | Australia | Riley Day |
| Entry standard – 22.80 | 0 | Belarus | ~~Krystsina Tsimanouskaya~~ |
| Entry standard – 22.80 | 0 | Belgium | ~~Cynthia Bolingo~~ |
| Entry standard – 22.80 | 1 | Brazil | Vitória Cristina Rosa |
| Entry standard – 22.80 | 1 | Bulgaria | Ivet Lalova-Collio |
| Entry standard – 22.80 | 1 | Canada | Crystal Emmanuel |
| Entry standard – 22.80 | 1 | France | Gémima Joseph |
| Entry standard – 22.80 | 1 | The Gambia | Gina Bass |
| Entry standard – 22.80 | 1 | Germany | Lisa-Marie Kwayie |
| Entry standard – 22.80 | 0 | Iraq | ~~Dana Hussain~~ |
| Entry standard – 22.80 | 1 | Ivory Coast | Marie-Josée Ta Lou |
| Entry standard – 22.80 | 1 | Netherlands | Dafne Schippers |
| Entry standard – 22.80 | 1 | Niger | Aminatou Seyni |
| Entry standard – 22.80 | 0 | Puerto Rico | ~~Jasmine Camacho-Quinn~~ |
| Entry standard – 22.80 | 1 | Slovenia | Maja Mihalinec |
| Entry standard – 22.80 | 1 | Switzerland | Mujinga Kambundji |
| Entry standard – 22.80 | 0 | Tajikistan | ~~Gulsumbi Sharifova~~ |
| Entry standard – 22.80 | 1 | Zambia | Rhodah Njobvu |
| World ranking | 1 | Germany | ~~Rebekka Haase~~; Jessica-Bianca Wessolly |
| World ranking | 2 | Italy | Gloria Hooper; Dalia Kaddari |
| World ranking | 1 | Belgium | Imke Vervaet |
| World ranking | 1 | Brazil | Ana Carolina Azevedo |
| World ranking | 1 | Bulgaria | Inna Eftimova |
| World ranking | 0 | Dominican Republic | ~~Marileidy Paulino~~ |
| World ranking | 0 | Egypt | ~~Bassant Hemida~~ |
| World ranking | 1 | Greece | Rafaéla Spanoudaki-Hatziriga |
| World ranking | 1 | India | Dutee Chand |
| World ranking | 1 | Ireland | Phil Healy |
| World ranking | 1 | Kazakhstan | Olga Safronova |
| World ranking | 1 | Netherlands | Jamile Samuel |
| World ranking | 1 | Portugal | Lorène Bazolo |
| World ranking | 1 | Spain | Jaël Bestué |
| World ranking | 0 | Switzerland | ~~Sarah Atcho~~ |
| Universality places | 1 | Pakistan | Najma Parveen |
| Universality places | 1 | Philippines | Kristina Knott |
| Universality places | 1 | Singapore | Shanti Pereira |
| Universality places | 1 | South Sudan | Lucia Moris |
| Total | 42 | | |

==== Women's 400 m ====
| Qualification standard | No. of athletes | NOC | Nominated athletes |
|---|---|---|---|
| Entry standard – 51.35 | 3 | Botswana | Christine Botlogetswe; Amantle Montsho; Galefele Moroko |
| Entry standard – 51.35 | 3 | Great Britain | Ama Pipi; Jodie Williams; Nicole Yeargin |
| Entry standard – 51.35 | 3 | Jamaica | Roneisha McGregor; Candice McLeod; Stephenie Ann McPherson |
| Entry standard – 51.35 | 1 | Poland | ~~Iga Baumgart-Witan~~; Natalia Kaczmarek; ~~Justyna Święty-Ersetic~~ |
| Entry standard – 51.35 | 3 | United States | Allyson Felix; Quanera Hayes; Wadeline Jonathas |
| Entry standard – 51.35 | 2 | Canada | Kyra Constantine; Natassha McDonald |
| Entry standard – 51.35 | 2 | Netherlands | Lieke Klaver; Lisanne de Witte |
| Entry standard – 51.35 | 1 | Australia | Bendere Oboya |
| Entry standard – 51.35 | 1 | Bahamas | Shaunae Miller-Uibo |
| Entry standard – 51.35 | 1 | Barbados | Sada Williams |
| Entry standard – 51.35 | 1 | Belgium | Cynthia Bolingo |
| Entry standard – 51.35 | 1 | Cuba | Roxana Gómez |
| Entry standard – 51.35 | 1 | Cyprus | Eleni Artymata |
| Entry standard – 51.35 | 1 | Czech Republic | Barbora Malíková |
| Entry standard – 51.35 | 1 | Dominican Republic | Marileidy Paulino |
| Entry standard – 51.35 | 1 | France | Amandine Brossier |
| Entry standard – 51.35 | 1 | Grenada | Meleni Rodney |
| Entry standard – 51.35 | 1 | Guyana | Aliyah Abrams |
| Entry standard – 51.35 | 1 | Kenya | Hellen Syombua |
| Entry standard – 51.35 | 1 | Mexico | Paola Morán |
| Entry standard – 51.35 | 1 | Portugal | Cátia Azevedo |
| World ranking | 1 | Austria | Susanne Walli |
| World ranking | 1 | Brazil | Tiffani Marinho |
| World ranking | 1 | Czech Republic | Lada Vondrová |
| World ranking | 1 | Germany | Corinna Schwab |
| World ranking | 1 | Greece | Irini Vasiliou |
| World ranking | 1 | Ireland | Phil Healy |
| World ranking | 1 | Lithuania | Agnė Šerkšnienė |
| World ranking | 1 | Nigeria | Patience Okon George |
| World ranking | 0 | Romania | ~~Andrea Miklós~~ |
| World ranking | 1 | Slovenia | Anita Horvat |
| World ranking | 1 | Spain | Aauri Bokesa |
| World ranking | 1 | Uganda | Leni Shida |
| World ranking | 1 | Ukraine | Tetyana Melnyk |
Universality places
| Universality places | 1 | Belize | Samantha Dirks |
| Universality places | 1 | Cayman Islands | Shalysa Wray |
| Universality places | 1 | Jordan | Aliya Boshnak |
| Total | 46 | | |

==== Women's 800 m ====
| Qualification standard | No. of athletes | NOC | Nominated athletes |
|---|---|---|---|
| Entry standard – 1:59.50 | 2 | Ethiopia | Habitam Alemu; Netsanet Desta; ~~Werkwuha Getachew~~ |
| Entry standard – 1:59.50 | 3 | Great Britain | Alexandra Bell; Keely Hodgkinson; Jemma Reekie |
| Entry standard – 1:59.50 | 3 | Kenya | Mary Moraa; Eunice Sum; Emily Cherotich Tuei |
| Entry standard – 1:59.50 | 3 | United States | Athing Mu; Raevyn Rogers; Ajeé Wilson |
| Entry standard – 1:59.50 | 2 | Canada | Melissa Bishop-Nriagu; Lindsey Butterworth |
| Entry standard – 1:59.50 | 2 | Germany | Christina Hering; Katharina Trost |
| Entry standard – 1:59.50 | 2 | Uganda | Halimah Nakaayi; Winnie Nanyondo |
| Entry standard – 1:59.50 | 1 | Australia | Catriona Bisset |
| Entry standard – 1:59.50 | 1 | China | Wang Chunyu |
| Entry standard – 1:59.50 | 1 | Cuba | Rose Mary Almanza |
| Entry standard – 1:59.50 | 1 | France | Rénelle Lamote |
| Entry standard – 1:59.50 | 1 | Jamaica | Natoya Goule |
| Entry standard – 1:59.50 | 0 | Ukraine | ~~Olha Lyakhova~~ |
| World ranking | 3 | Ireland | Síofra Cléirigh Büttner; Nadia Power; Louise Shanahan |
| World ranking | 3 | Poland | Joanna Jóźwik; Angelika Sarna; Anna Wielgosz |
| World ranking | 2 | Switzerland | Lore Hoffmann; Delia Sclabas |
| World ranking | 1 | Australia | Morgan Mitchell |
| World ranking | 1 | Benin | Noélie Yarigo |
| World ranking | 1 | Canada | Madeleine Kelly |
| World ranking | 1 | Finland | Sara Kuivisto |
| World ranking | 1 | Hungary | Bianka Kéri |
| World ranking | 1 | Italy | Elena Bellò |
| World ranking | 1 | Latvia | Līga Velvere |
| World ranking | 1 | Morocco | Rababe Arafi |
| World ranking | 1 | Norway | Hedda Hynne |
| World ranking | 1 | Slovakia | Gabriela Gajanová |
| World ranking | 1 | Spain | Natalia Romero |
| World ranking | 0 | Sweden | ~~Lovisa Lindh~~ |
| World ranking | 1 | Uruguay | Déborah Rodríguez |
| Universality places | 1 | Saint Vincent and the Grenadines | Shafiqua Maloney |
| Universality places | 1 | São Tomé and Príncipe | D'Jamila Tavares |
| Universality places | 1 | Sri Lanka | Nimali Liyanarachchi |
| Invitational Places | 1 | Refugee Olympic Team | Rose Lokonyen |
| Total | 46 | | |

==== Women's 1500 m ====
| Qualification standard | No. of athletes | NOC | Nominated athletes |
|---|---|---|---|
| Entry standard – 4:04.20 | 3 | Ethiopia | Freweyni Gebreezibeher; Lemlem Hailu; Diribe Welteji |
| Entry standard – 4:04.20 | 3 | Kenya | Winny Chebet; Edinah Jebitok; Faith Kipyegon |
| Entry standard – 4:04.20 | 3 | United States | Heather MacLean; Cory McGee; Elle Purrier St. Pierre |
| Entry standard – 4:04.20 | 2 | Australia | Linden Hall; Jessica Hull |
| Entry standard – 4:04.20 | 2 | Canada | Gabriela Debues-Stafford; Natalia Hawthorn |
| Entry standard – 4:04.20 | 2 | Great Britain | Laura Muir; Katie Snowden |
| Entry standard – 4:04.20 | 0 | Belarus | ~~Daryia Barysevich~~ |
| Entry standard – 4:04.20 | 1 | Belgium | Elise Vanderelst |
| Entry standard – 4:04.20 | 1 | Germany | Hanna Klein |
| Entry standard – 4:04.20 | 1 | Ireland | Ciara Mageean |
| Entry standard – 4:04.20 | 1 | Morocco | Rababe Arafi |
| Entry standard – 4:04.20 | 1 | Netherlands | Sifan Hassan |
| Entry standard – 4:04.20 | 1 | Romania | Claudia Bobocea |
| Entry standard – 4:04.20 | 1 | Spain | Esther Guerrero |
| Entry standard – 4:04.20 | 1 | Uganda | Winnie Nanyondo |
| World ranking | 3 | Czech Republic | Kristiina Mäki; Diana Mezuliáníková; Simona Vrzalová |
| World ranking | 2 | Italy | Federica Del Buono; Gaia Sabbatini |
| World ranking | 2 | Japan | Nozomi Tanaka; Ran Urabe |
| World ranking | 2 | Portugal | Salomé Afonso; Marta Pen Freitas |
| World ranking | 1 | Australia | Georgia Griffith |
| World ranking | 1 | Canada | Lucia Stafford |
| World ranking | 1 | Finland | Sara Kuivisto |
| World ranking | 1 | Germany | Caterina Granz |
| World ranking | 1 | Great Britain | Revée Walcott-Nolan |
| World ranking | 1 | Ireland | Sarah Healy |
| World ranking | 1 | Jamaica | Aisha Praught-Leer |
| World ranking | 1 | Mexico | Laura Galván |
| World ranking | 1 | Poland | Martyna Galant |
| World ranking | 1 | Spain | Marta Pérez |
| World ranking | 1 | Uruguay | María Pía Fernández |
| Universality places | 1 | Djibouti | Souhra Ali Mohamed |
| Invitational places | 1 | Refugee Olympic Team | Anjelina Lohalith |
| Total | 45 | | |

==== Women's 5000 m ====
| Qualification standard | No. of athletes | NOC | Nominated athletes |
|---|---|---|---|
| Entry standard – 15:10.00 | 3 | Canada | Andrea Seccafien; Julie-Anne Staehli; Kate Van Buskirk |
| Entry standard – 15:10.00 | 3 | Ethiopia | Ejgayehu Taye; Senbere Teferi; Gudaf Tsegay |
| Entry standard – 15:10.00 | 3 | Great Britain | Jessica Judd; Amy-Eloise Markovc; Eilish McColgan |
| Entry standard – 15:10.00 | 3 | Kenya | Hellen Obiri; Lilian Kasait Rengeruk; Agnes Jebet Tirop |
| Entry standard – 15:10.00 | 3 | Uganda | Esther Chebet; Sarah Chelangat; Prisca Chesang |
| Entry standard – 15:10.00 | 3 | United States | Elise Cranny; Rachel Schneider; Karissa Schweizer |
| Entry standard – 15:10.00 | 2 | Australia | Isobel Batt-Doyle; Rose Davies |
| Entry standard – 15:10.00 | 2 | Japan | Ririka Hironaka; Nozomi Tanaka |
| Entry standard – 15:10.00 | 2 | Netherlands | Sifan Hassan; Diane van Es |
| Entry standard – 15:10.00 | 0 | Bahrain | ~~Kalkidan Gezahegne~~ |
| Entry standard – 15:10.00 | 1 | Burundi | Francine Niyonsaba |
| Entry standard – 15:10.00 | 1 | Eritrea | Rahel Daniel |
| Entry standard – 15:10.00 | 1 | Israel | Selamawit Teferi |
| Entry standard – 15:10.00 | 1 | Italy | Nadia Battocletti |
| Entry standard – 15:10.00 | 1 | Mexico | Laura Galván |
| Entry standard – 15:10.00 | 0 | Morocco | ~~Siham Hilali~~ |
| Entry standard – 15:10.00 | 1 | New Zealand | Camille Buscomb |
| Entry standard – 15:10.00 | 1 | Norway | Karoline Bjerkeli Grøvdal |
| Entry standard – 15:10.00 | 1 | South Africa | Dominique Scott |
| Entry standard – 15:10.00 | 1 | Turkey | Yasemin Can |
| World ranking | 0 | Albania | ~~Luiza Gega~~ |
| World ranking | 1 | Australia | Jenny Blundell |
| World ranking | 1 | Japan | Kaede Hagitani |
| World ranking | 0 | Netherlands | ~~Maureen Koster~~ |
| World ranking | 1 | Slovenia | Klara Lukan |
| World ranking | 1 | Spain | Lucía Rodríguez |
| Universality places | 1 | Rwanda | Marthe Yankurije |
| Total | 38 | | |

==== Women's 10,000 m ====
The initial target for Entry standard (27) has been exceeded.

| Qualification standard | No. of athletes | NOC | Nominated athletes |
|---|---|---|---|
| Entry standard – 31:25.00 | 3 | Ethiopia | Tsigie Gebreselama; Tsehay Gemechu; Letesenbet Gidey |
| Entry standard – 31:25.00 | 3 | Japan | Yuka Ando; Ririka Hironaka; Hitomi Niiya |
| Entry standard – 31:25.00 | 3 | Kenya | Sheila Chelangat; Irene Chepet Cheptai; Hellen Obiri |
| Entry standard – 31:25.00 | 3 | United States | Alicia Monson; Karissa Schweizer; Emily Sisson |
| Entry standard – 31:25.00 | 2 | Great Britain | Jessica Judd; Eilish McColgan |
| Entry standard – 31:25.00 | 1 | Israel | ~~Lonah Chemtai Salpeter~~; Selamawit Teferi |
| Entry standard – 31:25.00 | 2 | Netherlands | Sifan Hassan; Susan Krumins |
| Entry standard – 31:25.00 | 2 | Sweden | Meraf Bahta; Sarah Lahti |
| Entry standard – 31:25.00 | 1 | Bahrain | Kalkidan Gezahegne |
| Entry standard – 31:25.00 | 1 | Burundi | Francine Niyonsaba |
| Entry standard – 31:25.00 | 1 | Canada | Andrea Seccafien |
| Entry standard – 31:25.00 | 1 | Eritrea | Dolshi Tesfu |
| Entry standard – 31:25.00 | 1 | Germany | Konstanze Klosterhalfen |
| Entry standard – 31:25.00 | 1 | New Zealand | Camille Buscomb |
| Entry standard – 31:25.00 | 1 | Norway | Karoline Bjerkeli Grøvdal |
| Entry standard – 31:25.00 | 1 | South Africa | Dominique Scott |
| Entry standard – 31:25.00 | 1 | Turkey | Yasemin Can |
| Entry standard – 31:25.00 | 1 | Uganda | Mercyline Chelangat |
| World ranking | 0 | | |
| Total | 29 | | |

==== Women's 100 m hurdles ====
Does not include indoor achievements

| Qualification standard | No. of athletes | NOC | Nominated athletes |
|---|---|---|---|
| Entry standard – 12.84 | 3 | Jamaica | Britany Anderson; Megan Tapper; Yanique Thompson |
| Entry standard – 12.84 | 3 | United States | Christina Clemons; Gabbi Cunningham; Kendra Harrison |
| Entry standard – 12.84 | 2 | Bahamas | Devynne Charlton; Pedrya Seymour |
| Entry standard – 12.84 | 2 | Finland | Reetta Hurske; Annimari Korte |
| Entry standard – 12.84 | 2 | Great Britain | Tiffany Porter; Cindy Sember |
| Entry standard – 12.84 | 2 | Poland | Klaudia Siciarz; Pia Skrzyszowska |
| Entry standard – 12.84 | 1 | Australia | Elizabeth Clay |
| Entry standard – 12.84 | 1 | Belarus | Elvira Herman |
| Entry standard – 12.84 | 1 | Burkina Faso | Marthe Koala |
| Entry standard – 12.84 | 1 | Costa Rica | Andrea Vargas |
| Entry standard – 12.84 | 1 | France | Cyréna Samba-Mayela |
| Entry standard – 12.84 | 1 | Hungary | Luca Kozák |
| Entry standard – 12.84 | 1 | Italy | Luminosa Bogliolo |
| Entry standard – 12.84 | 1 | Netherlands | Nadine Visser |
| Entry standard – 12.84 | 1 | Nigeria | Tobi Amusan |
| Entry standard – 12.84 | 1 | Puerto Rico | Jasmine Camacho-Quinn |
| World ranking | 3 | Japan | Masumi Aoki; Ayako Kimura; Asuka Terada |
| World ranking | 1 | Belgium | Anne Zagré |
| World ranking | 1 | Brazil | Ketiley Batista |
| World ranking | 1 | China | Chen Jiamin |
| World ranking | 0 | Finland | ~~Nooralotta Neziri~~ |
| World ranking | 1 | France | Laura Valette |
| World ranking | 1 | Germany | Ricarda Lobe |
| World ranking | 1 | Greece | Elisavet Pesiridou |
| World ranking | 1 | Ireland | Sarah Lavin |
| World ranking | 1 | Italy | Elisa Di Lazzaro |
| World ranking | 1 | Netherlands | Zoë Sedney |
| World ranking | 1 | Spain | Teresa Errandonea |
| World ranking | 1 | Switzerland | Ditaji Kambundji |
| Universality places | 1 | Liberia | Ebony Morrison |
| Universality places | 1 | Haiti | Mulern Jean |
| Universality places | 1 | Paraguay | Ana Camila Pirelli |
| Total | 41 | | |

==== Women's 400 m hurdles ====
| Qualification standard | No. of athletes | NOC | Nominated athletes |
|---|---|---|---|
| Entry standard – 55.40 | 3 | Great Britain | Meghan Beesley; Jessie Knight; Jessica Turner |
| Entry standard – 55.40 | 3 | Jamaica | Leah Nugent; Janieve Russell; Ronda Whyte |
| Entry standard – 55.40 | 3 | United States | Anna Cockrell; Sydney McLaughlin; Dalilah Muhammad |
| Entry standard – 55.40 | 2 | Belgium | Hanne Claes; Paulien Couckuyt |
| Entry standard – 55.40 | 2 | Italy | Eleonora Marchiando; Yadisleidy Pedroso |
| Entry standard – 55.40 | 2 | Ukraine | Anna Ryzhykova; Viktoriya Tkachuk |
| Entry standard – 55.40 | 1 | Australia | Sarah Carli |
| Entry standard – 55.40 | 1 | Bahrain | Aminat Yusuf Jamal |
| Entry standard – 55.40 | 1 | Barbados | Tia-Adana Belle |
| Entry standard – 55.40 | 1 | Brazil | Chayenne da Silva |
| Entry standard – 55.40 | 1 | Canada | Sage Watson |
| Entry standard – 55.40 | 1 | Cuba | Zurian Hechavarría |
| Entry standard – 55.40 | 0 | Czech Republic | ~~Zuzana Hejnová~~ |
| Entry standard – 55.40 | 1 | Denmark | Sara Slott Petersen |
| Entry standard – 55.40 | 1 | Germany | Carolina Krafzik |
| Entry standard – 55.40 | 1 | Netherlands | Femke Bol |
| Entry standard – 55.40 | 1 | Norway | Amalie Iuel |
| Entry standard – 55.40 | 1 | Panama | Gianna Woodruff |
| Entry standard – 55.40 | 1 | Poland | Joanna Linkiewicz |
| Entry standard – 55.40 | 1 | Slovakia | Emma Zapletalová |
| Entry standard – 55.40 | 1 | South Africa | Wenda Nel |
| Entry standard – 55.40 | 1 | Switzerland | Léa Sprunger |
| World ranking | 1 | Canada | Noelle Montcalm |
| World ranking | 1 | Colombia | Melissa Gonzalez |
| World ranking | 1 | Finland | Viivi Lehikoinen |
| World ranking | 1 | Italy | Linda Olivieri |
| World ranking | 1 | Norway | Line Kloster |
| World ranking | 1 | Switzerland | Yasmin Giger |
| World ranking | 1 | Trinidad and Tobago | Sparkle McKnight |
| World ranking | 1 | Ukraine | Mariya Mykolenko |
| Universality Places | 1 | Algeria | Loubna Benhadja |
| Universality Places | 1 | Vietnam | Quách Thị Lan |
| Total | 40 | | |

==== Women's 3000 m steeplechase ====
| Qualification standard | No. of athletes | NOC | Nominated athletes |
|---|---|---|---|
| Entry standard – 9:30.00 | 3 | Ethiopia | Mekides Abebe; Lomi Muleta; Zerfe Wondemagegn |
| Entry standard – 9:30.00 | 3 | Kenya | Beatrice Chepkoech; Purity Cherotich Kirui; Hyvin Kiyeng Jepkemoi |
| Entry standard – 9:30.00 | 3 | United States | Emma Coburn; Valerie Constien; Courtney Frerichs |
| Entry standard – 9:30.00 | 2 | Australia | Amy Cashin; Genevieve Gregson |
| Entry standard – 9:30.00 | 2 | Canada | Geneviève Lalonde; Regan Yee |
| Entry standard – 9:30.00 | 2 | Germany | Gesa Felicitas Krause; Lea Meyer |
| Entry standard – 9:30.00 | 2 | Great Britain | Elizabeth Bird; Aimee Pratt |
| Entry standard – 9:30.00 | 2 | Poland | Alicja Konieczek; Aneta Konieczek |
| Entry standard – 9:30.00 | 1 | Albania | Luiza Gega |
| Entry standard – 9:30.00 | 1 | Bahrain | Winfred Mutile Yavi |
| Entry standard – 9:30.00 | 0 | China | ~~Zhang Xinyan~~ |
| Entry standard – 9:30.00 | 1 | Denmark | Anna Emilie Møller |
| Entry standard – 9:30.00 | 1 | Hungary | Zita Kácser |
| Entry standard – 9:30.00 | 1 | Ireland | Michelle Finn |
| Entry standard – 9:30.00 | 1 | Netherlands | Irene van der Reijken |
| Entry standard – 9:30.00 | 1 | Slovenia | Maruša Mišmaš-Zrimsek |
| Entry standard – 9:30.00 | 0 | Spain | ~~Irene Sánchez-Escribano~~ |
| Entry standard – 9:30.00 | 1 | Uganda | Peruth Chemutai |
| World ranking | 2 | Brazil | Tatiane Raquel da Silva; Simone Ferraz |
| World ranking | 1 | Hungary | Lili Anna Tóth; ~~Viktória Wagner-Gyürkés~~ |
| World ranking | 1 | Argentina | Belén Casetta |
| World ranking | 1 | Australia | Georgia Winkcup |
| World ranking | 1 | Canada | Alycia Butterworth |
| World ranking | 1 | China | Xu Shuangshuang |
| World ranking | 0 | Finland | ~~Camilla Richardsson~~ |
| World ranking | 1 | Germany | Elena Burkard |
| World ranking | 1 | Ireland | Eilish Flanagan |
| World ranking | 1 | Israel | Adva Cohen |
| World ranking | 1 | Japan | Yuno Yamanaka |
| World ranking | 1 | Spain | Carolina Robles |
| World ranking | 1 | Tunisia | Marwa Bouzayani |
| World ranking | 1 | Ukraine | Nataliya Strebkova |
| Total | 41 | | |

== Road events ==
=== Men's road events ===
==== Men's marathon ====
Qualification ended on 31 May 2021. Both marathons had a target number of 80 athletes, but a larger number of athletes fulfilled the qualifying criteria and competed in Sapporo, the venue of the Olympic road events. In the men's field, 106 athletes qualified (maximum three per nation).

| Qualification standard | No. of athletes | NOC | Nominated athletes |
|---|---|---|---|
| Entry standard – 2:11:30 | 3 | Australia | Liam Adams; Jack Rayner; Brett Robinson |
| Entry standard – 2:11:30 | 3 | Bahrain | Alemu Bekele; Shumi Dechasa; El-Hassan El-Abbassi |
| Entry standard – 2:11:30 | 3 | Belgium | Bashir Abdi; Dieter Kersten; Koen Naert |
| Entry standard – 2:11:30 | 3 | Brazil | Daniel Chaves da Silva; Daniel Ferreira do Nascimento; Paulo Roberto Paula |
| Entry standard – 2:11:30 | 3 | Canada | Trevor Hofbauer; Cameron Levins; Ben Preisner |
| Entry standard – 2:11:30 | 3 | China | Dong Guojian; Peng Jianhua; Yang Shaohui |
| Entry standard – 2:11:30 | 3 | Eritrea | Yohanes Ghebregergis; Goitom Kifle; Oqbe Kibrom Ruesom |
| Entry standard – 2:11:30 | 3 | Ethiopia | Lelisa Desisa; Shura Kitata; Sisay Lemma |
| Entry standard – 2:11:30 | 3 | France | Morhad Amdouni; Hassan Chahdi; Nicolas Navarro |
| Entry standard – 2:11:30 | 3 | Germany | Amanal Petros; Hendrik Pfeiffer; Richard Ringer |
| Entry standard – 2:11:30 | 3 | Great Britain | Ben Connor; Callum Hawkins; Chris Thompson |
| Entry standard – 2:11:30 | 3 | Ireland | Paul Pollock; Stephen Scullion; Kevin Seaward |
| Entry standard – 2:11:30 | 3 | Israel | Haimro Alame; Girmaw Amare; Marhu Teferi |
| Entry standard – 2:11:30 | 3 | Italy | Yassine El Fathaoui; Eyob Faniel; Yassine Rachik |
| Entry standard – 2:11:30 | 3 | Kenya | Lawrence Cherono; Eliud Kipchoge; Amos Kipruto |
| Entry standard – 2:11:30 | 3 | Mexico | Jesús Arturo Esparza; Juan Pacheco; José Luis Santana |
| Entry standard – 2:11:30 | 3 | Morocco | Mohamed Reda El Aaraby; Othmane El Goumri; Hamza Sahli |
| Entry standard – 2:11:30 | 3 | Netherlands | Khalid Choukoud; Abdi Nageeye; Bart van Nunen |
| Entry standard – 2:11:30 | 3 | Poland | Marcin Chabowski; Arkadiusz Gardzielewski; Adam Nowicki |
| Entry standard – 2:11:30 | 3 | South Africa | Elroy Gelant; Desmond Mokgobu; Stephen Mokoka |
| Entry standard – 2:11:30 | 3 | Spain | Javier Guerra; Ayad Lamdassem; Daniel Mateo |
| Entry standard – 2:11:30 | 0 | Sweden | ~~Ebba Tulu Chala~~; ~~Mustafa Mohamed~~; ~~David Nilsson~~ |
| Entry standard – 2:11:30 | 2 | Turkey | Yavuz Ağralı; Polat Kemboi Arıkan; ~~Kaan Kigen Özbilen~~ |
| Entry standard – 2:11:30 | 3 | Uganda | Felix Chemonges; Stephen Kiprotich; Fred Musobo |
| Entry standard – 2:11:30 | 3 | Ukraine | Bohdan-Ivan Horodyskyy; Mykola Nyzhnyk; Oleksandr Sitkovskyy |
| Entry standard – 2:11:30 | 3 | United States | Abdi Abdirahman; Jacob Riley; Galen Rupp |
| Entry standard – 2:11:30 | 2 | Argentina | Joaquín Arbe; Eulalio Muñoz |
| Entry standard – 2:11:30 | 2 | Austria | Peter Herzog; Lemawork Ketema |
| Entry standard – 2:11:30 | 2 | Colombia | Iván Darío González; Jeison Suárez |
| Entry standard – 2:11:30 | 2 | Denmark | Thijs Nijhuis; Abdi Hakin Ulad |
| Entry standard – 2:11:30 | 2 | Estonia | Roman Fosti; Tiidrek Nurme |
| Entry standard – 2:11:30 | 2 | Japan | Shogo Nakamura; Suguru Osako |
| Entry standard – 2:11:30 | 2 | Mongolia | Tseveenravdangiin Byambajav; Bat-Ochiryn Ser-Od |
| Entry standard – 2:11:30 | 2 | New Zealand | Malcolm Hicks; Zane Robertson |
| Entry standard – 2:11:30 | 1 | Rwanda | John Hakizimana; ~~Félicien Muhitira~~ |
| Entry standard – 2:11:30 | 2 | South Korea | Oh Joo-han; Shim Jung-sub |
| Entry standard – 2:11:30 | 2 | Tanzania | Gabriel Geay; Alphonce Simbu |
| Entry standard – 2:11:30 | 1 | Burundi | Olivier Irabaruta |
| Entry standard – 2:11:30 | 1 | Lesotho | Khoarahlane Seutloali |
| Entry standard – 2:11:30 | 1 | Namibia | Tomas Hilifa Rainhold |
| Entry standard – 2:11:30 | 0 | ~~North Korea~~ | ~~Ri Kang-bom~~ |
| Entry standard – 2:11:30 | 1 | Norway | Sondre Nordstad Moen |
| Entry standard – 2:11:30 | 1 | Panama | Jorge Castelblanco |
| Entry standard – 2:11:30 | 1 | Paraguay | Derlis Ayala |
| Entry standard – 2:11:30 | 1 | Peru | Cristhian Pacheco |
| Entry standard – 2:11:30 | 1 | Refugee Olympic Team | Tachlowini Gabriyesos |
| Entry standard – 2:11:30 | 1 | Switzerland | Tadesse Abraham |
| Finishing position at designated competitions | 1 | Japan | Yuma Hattori |
| World ranking | 0 | | |
| Universality Places | 1 | Honduras | Iván Zarco |
| Total | 106 | | |

==== Men's 20 km walk ====
Entry number: 60.

| Qualification standard | No. of athletes | NOC | Nominated athletes |
|---|---|---|---|
| Entry standard – 1:21:00 | 3 | China | Cai Zelin; Wang Kaihua; Zhang Jun |
| Entry standard – 1:21:00 | 3 | Ecuador | David Hurtado; Jordy Jiménez; Brian Pintado |
| Entry standard – 1:21:00 | 3 | Guatemala | José Alejandro Barrondo; José Oswaldo Calel; José Ortiz |
| Entry standard – 1:21:00 | 3 | India | Irfan Kolothum Thodi; Sandeep Kumar; Rahul Rohilla |
| Entry standard – 1:21:00 | 3 | Italy | Francesco Fortunato; Massimo Stano; Federico Tontodonati |
| Entry standard – 1:21:00 | 3 | Japan | Koki Ikeda; Eiki Takahashi; Toshikazu Yamanishi |
| Entry standard – 1:21:00 | 3 | Mexico | Noel Alí Chama; Andrés Olivas; Jesús Tadeo Vega |
| Entry standard – 1:21:00 | 3 | Spain | Diego García; Miguel Ángel López; Álvaro Martín |
| Entry standard – 1:21:00 | 0 | Australia | ~~Dane Bird-Smith~~; ~~Rhydian Cowley~~ |
| Entry standard – 1:21:00 | 2 | Brazil | Caio Bonfim; Matheus Correa |
| Entry standard – 1:21:00 | 1 | Colombia | Éider Arévalo; ~~José Montaña~~ |
| Entry standard – 1:21:00 | 2 | France | Gabriel Bordier; Kévin Campion |
| Entry standard – 1:21:00 | 2 | Germany | Nils Brembach; Christopher Linke |
| Entry standard – 1:21:00 | 2 | Great Britain | Tom Bosworth; Callum Wilkinson |
| Entry standard – 1:21:00 | 2 | Ukraine | Ivan Losev; Eduard Zabuzhenko |
| Entry standard – 1:21:00 | 0 | Ireland | ~~Alex Wright~~ |
| Entry standard – 1:21:00 | 1 | Kazakhstan | Georgiy Sheiko |
| Entry standard – 1:21:00 | 0 | Kenya | ~~Samuel Gathimba~~ |
| Entry standard – 1:21:00 | 1 | Lithuania | Marius Žiūkas |
| Entry standard – 1:21:00 | 1 | ROC | Vasiliy Mizinov |
| Entry standard – 1:21:00 | 1 | South Africa | Wayne Snyman |
| Entry standard – 1:21:00 | 1 | South Korea | Choe Byeong-kwang |
| Entry standard – 1:21:00 | 1 | Sweden | Perseus Karlström |
| Entry standard – 1:21:00 | 1 | Turkey | Salih Korkmaz |
| World ranking | 2 | Australia | Kyle Swan; Declan Tingay |
| World ranking | 2 | Colombia | Jhon Castañeda; Manuel Esteban Soto |
| World ranking | 2 | Peru | Luis Henry Campos; César Rodríguez |
| World ranking | 2 | Turkey | Abdulselam İmuk; Şahin Şenoduncu |
| World ranking | 1 | Belarus | Aliaksandr Liakhovich |
| World ranking | 1 | Brazil | Lucas Mazzo |
| World ranking | 1 | Germany | Leo Köpp |
| World ranking | 1 | Ireland | David Kenny |
| World ranking | 1 | Poland | Łukasz Niedziałek |
| World ranking | 1 | Slovakia | Miroslav Úradník |
| World ranking | 0 | South Africa | ~~Lebogang Shange~~ |
| World ranking | 0 | Ukraine | ~~Viktor Shumik~~ |
| World ranking | 1 | United States | Nick Christie |
| Total | 57 | | |

==== Men's 50 km walk ====
The qualification period ended on 31 May 2021. The entry standard was 3:50:00. The target number was 60 athletes (with a maximum of three per nation) and 38 athletes met the entry standard, leaving 22 places for athletes qualifying by world ranking.

| Qualification standard | No. of athletes | NOC | Nominated athletes |
|---|---|---|---|
| Entry standard – 3:50:00 | 3 | China | Bian Tongda; Luo Yadong; Wang Qin |
| Entry standard – 3:50:00 | 3 | Germany | Carl Dohmann; Jonathan Hilbert; Nathaniel Seiler |
| Entry standard – 3:50:00 | 3 | Japan | Hayato Katsuki; Masatora Kawano; Satoshi Maruo |
| Entry standard – 3:50:00 | 3 | Poland | Rafał Augustyn; Artur Brzozowski; Dawid Tomala |
| Entry standard – 3:50:00 | 2 | Colombia | Diego Pinzón; Jorge Ruíz |
| Entry standard – 3:50:00 | 2 | Ecuador | Andrés Chocho; Claudio Villanueva |
| Entry standard – 3:50:00 | 2 | Finland | Aleksi Ojala; Aku Partanen |
| Entry standard – 3:50:00 | 2 | Guatemala | Bernardo Barrondo; Luis Ángel Sánchez |
| Entry standard – 3:50:00 | 2 | Italy | Andrea Agrusti; Teodorico Caporaso |
| Entry standard – 3:50:00 | 2 | Mexico | Horacio Nava; Isaac Palma |
| Entry standard – 3:50:00 | 2 | Spain | Luis Manuel Corchete; Marc Tur |
| Entry standard – 3:50:00 | 2 | Ukraine | Ivan Banzeruk; Maryan Zakalnytskyy |
| Entry standard – 3:50:00 | 1 | Belarus | Dzmitry Dziubin |
| Entry standard – 3:50:00 | 1 | Canada | Evan Dunfee |
| Entry standard – 3:50:00 | 1 | France | Yohann Diniz |
| Entry standard – 3:50:00 | 1 | Ireland | Brendan Boyce |
| Entry standard – 3:50:00 | 1 | Lithuania | Arturas Mastianica |
| Entry standard – 3:50:00 | 1 | New Zealand | Quentin Rew |
| Entry standard – 3:50:00 | 1 | Norway | Håvard Haukenes |
| Entry standard – 3:50:00 | 1 | Portugal | João Vieira |
| Entry standard – 3:50:00 | 1 | Slovakia | Matej Tóth |
| World ranking | 2 | Czech Republic | Lukáš Gdula; Vít Hlaváč |
| World ranking | 2 | Hungary | Máté Helebrandt; Bence Venyercsán |
| World ranking | 2 | Latvia | Arnis Rumbenieks; Ruslans Smolonskis |
| World ranking | 1 | Australia | Rhydian Cowley |
| World ranking | 0 | Brazil | ~~Caio Bonfim~~ |
| World ranking | 1 | Canada | Mathieu Bilodeau |
| World ranking | 1 | Colombia | José Montaña |
| World ranking | 1 | Ecuador | Jhonatan Amores |
| World ranking | 1 | Finland | Jarkko Kinnunen |
| World ranking | 1 | Greece | Alexandros Papamichail |
| World ranking | 1 | Guatemala | Érick Bernabé Barrondo |
| World ranking | 1 | India | Gurpreet Singh |
| World ranking | 1 | Ireland | Alex Wright |
| World ranking | 1 | Italy | Marco De Luca |
| World ranking | 1 | Mexico | José Leyver |
| World ranking | 1 | Romania | Marius Cocioran |
| World ranking | 1 | Slovakia | Michal Morvay |
| World ranking | 1 | South Africa | Marc Mundell |
| World ranking | 1 | Spain | Jesús Ángel García |
| World ranking | 1 | Ukraine | Valeriy Litanyuk |
| World ranking | Total | 59 | |

=== Women's road events ===
==== Women's marathon ====
Qualification ended on 31 May 2021. Both marathons had a target number of 80 athletes, but a larger number of athletes fulfilled the qualifying criteria and competed in Sapporo, the venue of the Olympic road events. In the women's field 91 athletes qualified (maximum three per nation):

- By Entry Standard: 89
- By Finishing Position at Designated Competitions: 1
- By World Rankings Position, to complete the required entry number of 80: 0
- By Universality Places: 1

| Qualification standard | No. of athletes | NOC | Nominated athletes |
|---|---|---|---|
| Entry standard – 2:29:30 | 3 | Australia | Sinead Diver; Ellie Pashley; Lisa Weightman |
| Entry standard – 2:29:30 | 2 | Bahrain | Eunice Chumba; Tejitu Daba |
| Entry standard – 2:29:30 | 3 | Canada | Malindi Elmore; Dayna Pidhoresky; Natasha Wodak |
| Entry standard – 2:29:30 | 3 | China | Bai Li; Li Zhixuan; Zhang Deshun |
| Entry standard – 2:29:30 | 3 | Czech Republic | Tereza Hrochová; Marcela Joglová; Eva Vrabcová Nývltová |
| Entry standard – 2:29:30 | 3 | Ethiopia | Roza Dereje; Birhane Dibaba; Zeineba Yimer |
| Entry standard – 2:29:30 | 3 | Germany | Melat Yisak Kejeta; Deborah Schöneborn; Katharina Steinruck |
| Entry standard – 2:29:30 | 3 | Great Britain | Stephanie Davis; Jess Piasecki; Stephanie Twell |
| Entry standard – 2:29:30 | 3 | Japan | Mao Ichiyama; Honami Maeda; Ayuko Suzuki |
| Entry standard – 2:29:30 | 3 | Kenya | Ruth Chepngetich; Peres Jepchirchir; Brigid Kosgei |
| Entry standard – 2:29:30 | 3 | Mexico | Andrea Ramírez Limón; Úrsula Sánchez; Daniela Torres Huerta |
| Entry standard – 2:29:30 | 1 | Morocco | Rkia El Moukim; ~~Souad Kanbouchia~~; ~~Majida Maayouf~~ |
| Entry standard – 2:29:30 | 2 | Netherlands | Andrea Deelstra; Jill Holterman; ~~Ruth van der Meijden~~ |
| Entry standard – 2:29:30 | 0 | ~~North Korea~~ | ~~Jo Un-ok~~; ~~Kim Ji-hyang~~; ~~Ri Kwang-ok~~ |
| Entry standard – 2:29:30 | 3 | Poland | Aleksandra Lisowska; Angelika Mach; Karolina Nadolska |
| Entry standard – 2:29:30 | 3 | Portugal | Sara Moreira; Catarina Ribeiro; Carla Salomé Rocha |
| Entry standard – 2:29:30 | 3 | Spain | Marta Galimany; Elena Loyo; Laura Méndez Esquer |
| Entry standard – 2:29:30 | 1 | Sweden | Carolina Wikström; ~~Charlotta Fougberg~~; ~~Hanna Lindholm~~ |
| Entry standard – 2:29:30 | 3 | Ukraine | Viktoria Kalyuzhna; Darya Mykhaylova; Yevheniya Prokofyeva |
| Entry standard – 2:29:30 | 3 | United States | Sally Kipyego; Molly Seidel; Aliphine Tuliamuk |
| Entry standard – 2:29:30 | 2 | Belarus | Volha Mazuronak; Nina Savina |
| Entry standard – 2:29:30 | 2 | Belgium | Mieke Gorissen; Hanne Verbruggen |
| Entry standard – 2:29:30 | 2 | Croatia | Bojana Bjeljac; Matea Parlov Koštro |
| Entry standard – 2:29:30 | 2 | Ecuador | Andrea Bonilla; Rosa Chacha |
| Entry standard – 2:29:30 | 2 | Eritrea | Kokob Tesfagaber Solomon; Nazret Weldu |
| Entry standard – 2:29:30 | 2 | Ireland | Aoife Cooke; Fionnuala McCormack |
| Entry standard – 2:29:30 | 2 | Israel | Lonah Chemtai Salpeter; Maor Tiyouri |
| Entry standard – 2:29:30 | 1 | Italy | ~~Sara Dossena~~; Giovanna Epis |
| Entry standard – 2:29:30 | 1 | Kyrgyzstan | ~~Iuliia Andreeva~~; Darya Maslova |
| Entry standard – 2:29:30 | 2 | Peru | Jovana de la Cruz; Gladys Tejeda |
| Entry standard – 2:29:30 | 0 | ROC | ~~Marina Kovalyova~~; ~~Sardana Trofimova~~ |
| Entry standard – 2:29:30 | 2 | South Africa | Gerda Steyn; Irvette van Zyl |
| Entry standard – 2:29:30 | 2 | South Korea | Ahn Seul-ki; Choi Kyung-sun |
| Entry standard – 2:29:30 | 2 | Uganda | Juliet Chekwel; Immaculate Chemutai |
| Entry standard – 2:29:30 | 1 | Argentina | Marcela Cristina Gomes |
| Entry standard – 2:29:30 | 1 | Colombia | Angie Orjuela |
| Entry standard – 2:29:30 | 1 | France | Susan Jeptooo Kipsang |
| Entry standard – 2:29:30 | 1 | Kazakhstan | Zhanna Mamazhanova |
| Entry standard – 2:29:30 | 1 | Lesotho | Neheng Khatala |
| Entry standard – 2:29:30 | 1 | Moldova | Lilia Fisikovici |
| Entry standard – 2:29:30 | 1 | Mongolia | Munkhzaya Bayartsogt |
| Entry standard – 2:29:30 | 1 | Namibia | Helalia Johannes |
| Entry standard – 2:29:30 | 1 | Switzerland | Fabienne Schlumpf |
| Entry standard – 2:29:30 | 1 | Tanzania | Failuna Matanga |
| Entry standard – 2:29:30 | 1 | Turkey | Meryem Erdoğan |
| Finishing position at designated competitions | 0 | Belarus | ~~Nastassia Ivanova~~ |
| Finishing position at designated competitions | 0 | Belgium | ~~Nina Lauwaert~~ |
| Finishing position at designated competitions | 0 | New Zealand | ~~Alice Mason~~ |
| Finishing position at designated competitions | 0 | Rwanda | ~~Salomé Nyirarukundo~~ |
| Finishing position at designated competitions | 1 | Switzerland | Martina Strähl |
| World ranking | 0 | | |
| Universality Places | 1 | Solomon Islands | Sharon Firisua |
| Total | 88 | | |

==== Women's 20 km walk ====
| Qualification standard | No. of athletes | NOC | Nominated athletes |
|---|---|---|---|
| Entry standard – 1:31:00 | 3 | China | Liu Hong; Qieyang Shijie; Yang Jiayu |
| Entry standard – 1:31:00 | 3 | Ecuador | Karla Jaramillo; Glenda Morejón; Paola Pérez |
| Entry standard – 1:31:00 | 3 | Italy | Eleonora Giorgi; Antonella Palmisano; Valentina Trapletti |
| Entry standard – 1:31:00 | 3 | Mexico | Alegna González; Ilse Guerrero; Valeria Ortuño |
| Entry standard – 1:31:00 | 3 | Spain | Laura García-Caro; Raquel González; María Pérez |
| Entry standard – 1:31:00 | 3 | Ukraine | Lyudmyla Olyanovska; Mariia Sakharuk; Hanna Shevchuk |
| Entry standard – 1:31:00 | 2 | Australia | Katie Hayward; Jemima Montag |
| Entry standard – 1:31:00 | 2 | Belarus | Viktoryia Rashchupkina; Anna Terlyukevich |
| Entry standard – 1:31:00 | 2 | Colombia | Sandra Arenas; Sandra Galvis |
| Entry standard – 1:31:00 | 2 | Guatemala | Mayra Herrera; Mirna Ortiz |
| Entry standard – 1:31:00 | 2 | India | Priyanka Goswami; Bhawna Jat |
| Entry standard – 1:31:00 | 2 | Japan | Nanako Fujii; Kumiko Okada |
| Entry standard – 1:31:00 | 1 | Lithuania | ~~Živilė Vaiciukevičiūtė~~; Brigita Virbalytė |
| Entry standard – 1:31:00 | 2 | Peru | Mary Luz Andía; Kimberly García |
| Entry standard – 1:31:00 | 2 | Turkey | Meryem Bekmez; Ayşe Tekdal |
| Entry standard – 1:31:00 | 1 | Brazil | Érica de Sena |
| Entry standard – 1:31:00 | 1 | Costa Rica | Noelia Vargas |
| Entry standard – 1:31:00 | 1 | Czech Republic | Tereza Ďurdiaková |
| Entry standard – 1:31:00 | 1 | Germany | Saskia Feige |
| Entry standard – 1:31:00 | 1 | Greece | Antigoni Drisbioti |
| Entry standard – 1:31:00 | 1 | Kazakhstan | Ayman Ratova |
| Entry standard – 1:31:00 | 0 | Kenya | ~~Emily Wamusyi Ngii~~ |
| Entry standard – 1:31:00 | 1 | Poland | Katarzyna Zdziebło |
| Entry standard – 1:31:00 | 1 | Portugal | Ana Cabecinha |
| Entry standard – 1:31:00 | 1 | ROC | Elvira Khasanova |
| World ranking | 2 | Greece | Kiriaki Filtisakou; Panagiota Tsinopoulou |
| World ranking | 2 | Hungary | Barbara Kovács; Viktória Madarász |
| World ranking | 1 | Australia | Rebecca Henderson |
| World ranking | 1 | Belarus | Anastasiya Rarouskaya |
| World ranking | 1 | Bolivia | Angela Castro |
| World ranking | 0 | Colombia | ~~Yeseida Carrillo~~ |
| World ranking | 0 | Czech Republic | ~~Anežka Drahotová~~ |
| World ranking | 1 | Ethiopia | Yehualeye Beletew |
| World ranking | 1 | Hong Kong | Ching Siu Nga |
| World ranking | 1 | Japan | Kaori Kawazoe |
| World ranking | 1 | Peru | Leyde Guerra |
| World ranking | 1 | Slovakia | Mária Czaková |
| World ranking | 1 | Turkey | Evin Demir |
| World ranking | 1 | United States | Robyn Stevens |
| Total | 58 | | |

== Field events ==
=== Men's field events ===
==== Men's high jump ====
Entry number: 33.

| Qualification standard | No. of athletes | NOC | Nominated athletes |
|---|---|---|---|
| Entry standard – 2.33 | 3 | United States | JuVaughn Harrison; Shelby McEwen; Darryl Sullivan |
| Entry standard – 2.33 | 2 | Italy | Stefano Sottile; Gianmarco Tamberi |
| Entry standard – 2.33 | 2 | ROC | Mikhail Akimenko; Ilya Ivanyuk |
| Entry standard – 2.33 | 1 | Australia | Brandon Starc |
| Entry standard – 2.33 | 1 | Bahamas | Jamal Wilson |
| Entry standard – 2.33 | 1 | Belarus | Maksim Nedasekau |
| Entry standard – 2.33 | 1 | Canada | Django Lovett |
| Entry standard – 2.33 | 1 | Cuba | Luis Zayas |
| Entry standard – 2.33 | 1 | Great Britain | Tom Gale |
| Entry standard – 2.33 | 1 | Qatar | Mutaz Essa Barshim |
| Entry standard – 2.33 | 1 | Switzerland | Loïc Gasch |
| Entry standard – 2.33 | 1 | Ukraine | Andriy Protsenko |
| World ranking | 2 | Brazil | Fernando Ferreira; Thiago Moura |
| World ranking | 2 | Japan | Takashi Eto; Naoto Tobe |
| World ranking | 1 | Bahamas | Donald Thomas |
| World ranking | 1 | Belarus | Dzmitry Nabokau |
| World ranking | 1 | Bulgaria | Tihomir Ivanov |
| World ranking | 1 | Canada | Michael Mason |
| World ranking | 1 | China | Wang Yu |
| World ranking | 1 | Germany | Mateusz Przybylko |
| World ranking | 1 | Kenya | Mathew Sawe |
| World ranking | 1 | Lithuania | Adrijus Glebauskas |
| World ranking | 1 | Malaysia | Lee Hup Wei |
| World ranking | 1 | Mexico | Edgar Rivera |
| World ranking | 1 | New Zealand | Hamish Kerr |
| World ranking | 1 | South Korea | Woo Sang-hyeok |
| World ranking | 1 | Syria | Majd Eddin Ghazal |
| Total | 33 | | |

==== Men's pole vault ====
Entry number: 33.

| Qualification standard | No. of athletes | NOC | Nominated athletes |
|---|---|---|---|
Entry standard – 5.80
| Entry standard – 5.80 | 3 | France | Ethan Cormont; Renaud Lavillenie; Valentin Lavillenie |
| Entry standard – 5.80 | 3 | Germany | Torben Blech; Bo Kanda Lita Baehre; Oleg Zernikel |
| Entry standard – 5.80 | 3 | United States | KC Lightfoot; Matt Ludwig; Chris Nilsen |
| Entry standard – 5.80 | 2 | Brazil | Thiago Braz; Augusto Dutra |
| Entry standard – 5.80 | 2 | Poland | Piotr Lisek; Paweł Wojciechowski |
| Entry standard – 5.80 | 1 | Australia | Kurtis Marschall |
| Entry standard – 5.80 | 1 | Belgium | Ben Broeders |
| Entry standard – 5.80 | 1 | Great Britain | Harry Coppell |
| Entry standard – 5.80 | 1 | Netherlands | Menno Vloon |
| Entry standard – 5.80 | 1 | Norway | Sondre Guttormsen |
| Entry standard – 5.80 | 1 | Philippines | Ernest John Obiena |
| Entry standard – 5.80 | 0 | ROC | ~~Timur Morgunov~~ |
| Entry standard – 5.80 | 1 | South Korea | Jin Min-sub |
| Entry standard – 5.80 | 1 | Sweden | Armand Duplantis |
| Entry standard – 5.80 | 1 | Turkey | Ersu Şaşma |
| World ranking | 2 | Greece | Konstantinos Filippidis; Emmanouil Karalis |
| World ranking | 2 | Japan | Masaki Ejima; Seito Yamamoto |
| World ranking | 0 | Argentina | ~~Germán Chiaraviglio~~ |
| World ranking | 1 | China | Huang Bokai |
| World ranking | 1 | Italy | Claudio Stecchi |
| World ranking | 0 | Netherlands | ~~Rutger Koppelaar~~ |
| World ranking | 1 | Poland | Robert Sobera |
| World ranking | 0 | Sweden | ~~Melker Svärd Jacobsson~~ |
| Total | 30 | | |

==== Men's long jump ====
Entry number: 32.

| Qualification standard | No. of athletes | NOC | Nominated athletes |
|---|---|---|---|
| Entry standard – 8.22 | 3 | Cuba | Juan Miguel Echevarría; Lester Lescay; Maykel Massó |
| Entry standard – 8.22 | 3 | Japan | Yuki Hashioka; Shotaro Shiroyama; Hibiki Tsuha |
| Entry standard – 8.22 | 2 | South Africa | Cheswill Johnson; ~~Luvo Manyonga~~; Ruswahl Samaai |
| Entry standard – 8.22 | 3 | United States | Marquis Dendy; JuVaughn Harrison; Steffin McCarter |
| Entry standard – 8.22 | 2 | China | Gao Xinglong; Huang Changzhou |
| Entry standard – 8.22 | 2 | Jamaica | Tajay Gayle; Carey McLeod |
| Entry standard – 8.22 | 1 | Brazil | Samory Fraga |
| Entry standard – 8.22 | 0 | Canada | ~~Damian Warner~~ |
| Entry standard – 8.22 | 1 | Finland | Kristian Pulli |
| Entry standard – 8.22 | 1 | Georgia | Bachana Khorava |
| Entry standard – 8.22 | 1 | Greece | Miltiadis Tentoglou |
| Entry standard – 8.22 | 1 | India | M. Sreeshankar |
| Entry standard – 8.22 | 1 | Sweden | Thobias Montler |
| Entry standard – 8.22 | 1 | Trinidad and Tobago | Andwuelle Wright |
| World ranking | 1 | Australia | Henry Frayne |
| World ranking | 1 | Brazil | Alexsandro Melo |
| World ranking | 1 | China | Wang Jianan |
| World ranking | 1 | France | Augustin Bey |
| World ranking | 1 | Germany | Fabian Heinle |
| World ranking | 1 | Italy | Filippo Randazzo |
| World ranking | 1 | Spain | Eusebio Cáceres |
| World ranking | 1 | Ukraine | Vladyslav Mazur |
| Universality Places | 1 | Albania | Izmir Smajlaj |
| Universality Places | 1 | Uruguay | Emiliano Lasa |
| Total | 32 | | |

==== Men's triple jump ====
Entry number: 32.

| Qualification standard | No. of athletes | NOC | Nominated athletes |
|---|---|---|---|
| Entry standard – 17.14 | 3 | China | Fang Yaoqing; Wu Ruiting; Zhu Yaming |
| Entry standard – 17.14 | 2 | Cuba | Andy Díaz; ~~Jordan Díaz~~; Cristian Nápoles |
| Entry standard – 17.14 | 3 | Italy | Tobia Bocchi; Andrea Dallavalle; Emmanuel Ihemeje |
| Entry standard – 17.14 | 3 | United States | Chris Benard; Will Claye; Donald Scott |
| Entry standard – 17.14 | 2 | Brazil | Almir dos Santos; Alexsandro Melo |
| Entry standard – 17.14 | 2 | France | Jean-Marc Pontvianne; Melvin Raffin |
| Entry standard – 17.14 | 1 | Algeria | Yasser Triki |
| Entry standard – 17.14 | 1 | Armenia | Levon Aghasyan |
| Entry standard – 17.14 | 1 | Azerbaijan | Nazim Babayev |
| Entry standard – 17.14 | 1 | Burkina Faso | Hugues Fabrice Zango |
| Entry standard – 17.14 | 1 | Georgia | Lasha Gulelauri |
| Entry standard – 17.14 | 1 | Great Britain | Ben Williams |
| Entry standard – 17.14 | 1 | Jamaica | Carey McLeod |
| Entry standard – 17.14 | 1 | Portugal | Pedro Pichardo |
| Entry standard – 17.14 | 0 | ROC | ~~Dmitry Sorokin~~ |
| Entry standard – 17.14 | 1 | Spain | Pablo Torrijos |
| Entry standard – 17.14 | 1 | Turkey | Necati Er |
| World ranking | 2 | Portugal | Nelson Évora; Tiago Pereira |
| World ranking | 1 | Brazil | Mateus de Sá |
| World ranking | 1 | France | Benjamin Compaoré |
| World ranking | 1 | Germany | Max Heß |
| World ranking | 1 | Greece | Dimitrios Tsiamis |
| World ranking | 1 | Uzbekistan | Ruslan Kurbanov |
| Total | 32 | | |

==== Men's shot put ====
Entry number: 32. No ranking necessary to complete the field.

| Qualification standard | No. of athletes | NOC | Nominated athletes |
|---|---|---|---|
| Entry standard – 21.10 | 3 | Italy | Leonardo Fabbri; Nick Ponzio; Zane Weir |
| Entry standard – 21.10 | 3 | United States | Ryan Crouser; Joe Kovacs; Payton Otterdahl |
| Entry standard – 21.10 | 2 | Egypt | Mostafa Amr Hassan; Mohamed Magdi Hamza |
| Entry standard – 21.10 | 1 | Georgia | ~~Benik Abrahamyan~~; Giorgi Mujaridze |
| Entry standard – 21.10 | 2 | New Zealand | Jacko Gill; Tom Walsh |
| Entry standard – 21.10 | 2 | Poland | Konrad Bukowiecki; Michał Haratyk |
| Entry standard – 21.10 | 2 | Serbia | Asmir Kolašinac; Armin Sinančević |
| Entry standard – 21.10 | 2 | South Africa | Kyle Blignaut; Jason van Rooyen |
| Entry standard – 21.10 | 1 | Bahrain | Abdelrahman Mahmoud |
| Entry standard – 21.10 | 1 | Bosnia and Herzegovina | Mesud Pezer |
| Entry standard – 21.10 | 1 | Brazil | Darlan Romani |
| Entry standard – 21.10 | 0 | British Virgin Islands | ~~Eldred Henry~~ |
| Entry standard – 21.10 | 1 | Canada | Tim Nedow |
| Entry standard – 21.10 | 1 | Croatia | Filip Mihaljević |
| Entry standard – 21.10 | 1 | Czech Republic | Tomáš Staněk |
| Entry standard – 21.10 | 1 | Great Britain | Scott Lincoln |
| Entry standard – 21.10 | 1 | India | Tajinderpal Singh Toor |
| Entry standard – 21.10 | 1 | Luxembourg | Bob Bertemes |
| Entry standard – 21.10 | 1 | Nigeria | Chukwuebuka Enekwechi |
| Entry standard – 21.10 | 1 | Portugal | Francisco Belo |
| Entry standard – 21.10 | 0 | ROC | ~~Aleksandr Lesnoy~~ |
| Entry standard – 21.10 | 1 | Romania | Andrei Rares Toader |
| Entry standard – 21.10 | 1 | Sweden | Wictor Petersson |
| Entry standard – 21.10 | 1 | Ukraine | Ihor Musiyenko |
| World ranking | 0 | | |
| Total | 31 | | |

==== Men's discus throw ====
Entry number: 32.

| Qualification standard | No. of athletes | NOC | Nominated athletes |
|---|---|---|---|
| Entry standard – 66.00 | 3 | Germany | Daniel Jasinski; Clemens Prüfer; David Wrobel |
| Entry standard – 66.00 | 3 | Jamaica | Fedrick Dacres; Traves Smikle; Chad Wright |
| Entry standard – 66.00 | 3 | United States | Mason Finley; Reggie Jagers; Sam Mattis |
| Entry standard – 66.00 | 2 | Sweden | Simon Pettersson; Daniel Ståhl |
| Entry standard – 66.00 | 1 | Australia | Matthew Denny |
| Entry standard – 66.00 | 1 | Austria | Lukas Weißhaidinger |
| Entry standard – 66.00 | 1 | Belarus | Yauheni Bahutski |
| Entry standard – 66.00 | 1 | Colombia | Mauricio Ortega |
| Entry standard – 66.00 | 1 | Cyprus | Apostolos Parellis |
| Entry standard – 66.00 | 1 | Ecuador | Juan Caicedo |
| Entry standard – 66.00 | 1 | France | Lolassonn Djouhan |
| Entry standard – 66.00 | 1 | Great Britain | Lawrence Okoye |
| Entry standard – 66.00 | 1 | Iran | Ehsan Haddadi |
| Entry standard – 66.00 | 1 | Italy | Giovanni Faloci |
| Entry standard – 66.00 | 1 | Lithuania | Andrius Gudžius |
| Entry standard – 66.00 | 1 | Norway | Ola Stunes Isene |
| Entry standard – 66.00 | 1 | Poland | Piotr Małachowski |
| Entry standard – 66.00 | 1 | Romania | Alin Firfirică |
| Entry standard – 66.00 | 1 | Samoa | Alex Rose |
| Entry standard – 66.00 | 1 | Slovenia | Kristjan Čeh |
| Entry standard – 66.00 | 1 | Spain | Lois Maikel Martínez |
| Entry standard – 66.00 | 1 | Ukraine | Mykyta Nesterenko |
| World ranking | 1 | Montenegro | Danijel Furtula |
| World ranking | 1 | Poland | Bartłomiej Stój |
| Universality places | 1 | Iceland | Guðni Valur Guðnason |
| Total | 32 | | |

==== Men's hammer throw ====
Entry number: 32.

| Qualification standard | No. of athletes | NOC | Nominated athletes |
|---|---|---|---|
| Entry standard – 77.50 | 3 | Belarus | Hleb Dudarau; Ivan Tsikhan; Yury Vasilchanka |
| Entry standard – 77.50 | 1 | ROC | ~~Denis Lukyanov~~; Valeriy Pronkin; ~~Andrey Romanov~~ |
| Entry standard – 77.50 | 2 | Ukraine | ~~Mykhailo Havryliuk~~; Mykhaylo Kokhan; Hlib Piskunov |
| Entry standard – 77.50 | 3 | United States | Daniel Haugh; Rudy Winkler; Alex Young |
| Entry standard – 77.50 | 2 | Chile | Gabriel Kehr; Humberto Mansilla |
| Entry standard – 77.50 | 2 | Great Britain | Taylor Campbell; Nick Miller |
| Entry standard – 77.50 | 2 | Poland | Paweł Fajdek; Wojciech Nowicki |
| Entry standard – 77.50 | 2 | Turkey | Eşref Apak; Özkan Baltacı |
| Entry standard – 77.50 | 1 | France | Quentin Bigot |
| Entry standard – 77.50 | 1 | Hungary | Bence Halász |
| Entry standard – 77.50 | 1 | Mexico | Diego del Real |
| Entry standard – 77.50 | 1 | Moldova | Serghei Marghiev |
| Entry standard – 77.50 | 1 | Norway | Eivind Henriksen |
| Entry standard – 77.50 | 1 | Slovakia | Marcel Lomnický |
| Entry standard – 77.50 | 1 | Spain | Javier Cienfuegos |
| Entry standard – 77.50 | 1 | Uzbekistan | Suhrob Khodjaev |
| World ranking | 2 | Greece | Michail Anastasakis; Christos Frantzeskakis |
| World ranking | 1 | Egypt | Mostafa El Gamel |
| World ranking | 1 | Germany | Tristan Schwandke |
| World ranking | 1 | Qatar | Ashraf Amgad El-Seify |
| Universality Places | 1 | Turkmenistan | Mergen Mämmedow |
| Total | 31 | | |

==== Men's javelin throw ====
Entry number: 32.

| Qualification standard | No. of athletes | NOC | Nominated athletes |
|---|---|---|---|
| Entry standard – 85.00 | 3 | Germany | Bernhard Seifert; Johannes Vetter; Julian Weber |
| Entry standard – 85.00 | 2 | Belarus | Aliaksei Katkavets; Pavel Mialeshka |
| Entry standard – 85.00 | 2 | Chinese Taipei | Cheng Chao-tsun; Huang Shih-feng |
| Entry standard – 85.00 | 2 | Finland | Oliver Helander; Toni Kuusela |
| Entry standard – 85.00 | 2 | India | Neeraj Chopra; Shivpal Singh |
| Entry standard – 85.00 | 1 | Czech Republic | Jakub Vadlejch |
| Entry standard – 85.00 | 0 | Estonia | ~~Magnus Kirt~~ |
| Entry standard – 85.00 | 1 | Grenada | Anderson Peters |
| Entry standard – 85.00 | 1 | Kenya | Julius Yego |
| Entry standard – 85.00 | 1 | Latvia | Gatis Čakšs |
| Entry standard – 85.00 | 1 | Lithuania | Edis Matusevičius |
| Entry standard – 85.00 | 1 | Moldova | Andrian Mardare |
| Entry standard – 85.00 | 1 | Pakistan | Arshad Nadeem |
| Entry standard – 85.00 | 1 | Poland | Marcin Krukowski |
| Entry standard – 85.00 | 0 | ROC | ~~Dmitry Tarabin~~ |
| Entry standard – 85.00 | 1 | South Africa | Rocco van Rooyen |
| Entry standard – 85.00 | 1 | Sweden | Kim Amb |
| Entry standard – 85.00 | 1 | Trinidad and Tobago | Keshorn Walcott |
| World ranking | 2 | United States | Michael Shuey; Curtis Thompson |
| World ranking | 1 | Czech Republic | Vítězslav Veselý |
| World ranking | 1 | Egypt | Ihab Abdelrahman |
| World ranking | 1 | Finland | Lassi Etelätalo |
| World ranking | 1 | Hungary | Norbert Rivasz-Tóth |
| World ranking | 1 | Japan | Takuto Kominami |
| World ranking | 1 | Poland | Cyprian Mrzygłód |
| World ranking | 1 | Romania | Alexandru Novac |
| World ranking | 1 | Spain | Odei Jainaga |
| Total | 32 | | |

=== Women's field events ===
==== Women's high jump ====
| Qualification standard | No. of athletes | NOC | Nominated athletes |
|---|---|---|---|
| Entry standard – 1.96 | 3 | Ukraine | Iryna Herashchenko; Yuliya Levchenko; Yaroslava Mahuchikh |
| Entry standard – 1.96 | 2 | Australia | Nicola McDermott; Eleanor Patterson |
| Entry standard – 1.96 | 1 | Belarus | Karyna Demidik; ~~Maryia Zhodzik~~ |
| Entry standard – 1.96 | 2 | Germany | Marie-Laurence Jungfleisch; Imke Onnen |
| Entry standard – 1.96 | 2 | Kazakhstan | Nadezhda Dubovitskaya; Kristina Ovchinnikova |
| Entry standard – 1.96 | 2 | Sweden | Erika Kinsey; Maja Nilsson |
| Entry standard – 1.96 | 2 | United States | Vashti Cunningham; Rachel McCoy |
| Entry standard – 1.96 | 2 | Uzbekistan | Svetlana Radzivil; Safina Sadullayeva |
| Entry standard – 1.96 | 1 | Bulgaria | Mirela Demireva |
| Entry standard – 1.96 | 1 | Finland | Ella Junnila |
| Entry standard – 1.96 | 1 | Great Britain | Morgan Lake |
| Entry standard – 1.96 | 1 | Italy | Elena Vallortigara |
| Entry standard – 1.96 | 1 | Montenegro | Marija Vuković |
| Entry standard – 1.96 | 1 | Poland | Kamila Lićwinko |
| Entry standard – 1.96 | 1 | ROC | Mariya Lasitskene |
| Entry standard – 1.96 | 1 | Romania | Daniela Stanciu |
| Entry standard – 1.96 | 1 | Switzerland | Salome Lang |
| World ranking | 1 | Croatia | Ana Šimić |
| World ranking | 1 | Great Britain | Emily Borthwick |
| World ranking | 1 | Italy | Alessia Trost |
| World ranking | 1 | Lithuania | Airinė Palšytė |
| World ranking | 1 | Saint Lucia | Levern Spencer |
| World ranking | 1 | United States | Tynita Butts |
| Total | 31 | | |

==== Women's pole vault ====
| Qualification standard | No. of athletes | NOC | Nominated athletes |
|---|---|---|---|
| Entry standard – 4.70 | 3 | Greece | Nikoleta Kyriakopoulou; Eleni-Klaoudia Polak; Katerina Stefanidi |
| Entry standard – 4.70 | 3 | United States | Morgann LeLeux; Sandi Morris; Katie Nageotte |
| Entry standard – 4.70 | 2 | Canada | Anicka Newell; Alysha Newman |
| Entry standard – 4.70 | 2 | China | Li Ling; Xu Huiqin |
| Entry standard – 4.70 | 2 | Sweden | Angelica Bengtsson; Michaela Meijer |
| Entry standard – 4.70 | 1 | Australia | Nina Kennedy |
| Entry standard – 4.70 | 1 | Belarus | Iryna Zhuk |
| Entry standard – 4.70 | 1 | Cuba | Yarisley Silva |
| Entry standard – 4.70 | 1 | Great Britain | Holly Bradshaw |
| Entry standard – 4.70 | 1 | Italy | Roberta Bruni |
| Entry standard – 4.70 | 1 | ROC | Anzhelika Sidorova |
| Entry standard – 4.70 | 1 | Slovenia | Tina Šutej |
| Entry standard – 4.70 | 1 | Switzerland | Angelica Moser |
| Entry standard – 4.70 | 1 | Ukraine | Maryna Kylypko |
| Entry standard – 4.70 | 1 | Venezuela | Robeilys Peinado |
| World ranking | 2 | Finland | Elina Lampela; Wilma Murto |
| World ranking | 1 | Australia | Liz Parnov |
| World ranking | 1 | Belgium | Fanny Smets |
| World ranking | 1 | Czech Republic | Romana Maláčová |
| World ranking | 0 | Germany | ~~Lisa Ryzih~~ |
| World ranking | 1 | Italy | Elisa Molinarolo |
| World ranking | 1 | Norway | Lene Retzius |
| World ranking | 1 | Switzerland | Andrina Hodel |
| World ranking | 1 | Ukraine | Yana Hladiychuk |
| Total | 31 | | |

==== Women's long jump ====
| Qualification standard | No. of athletes | NOC | Nominated athletes |
|---|---|---|---|
| Entry standard – 6.82 | 3 | Great Britain | Abigail Irozuru; Jazmin Sawyers; Lorraine Ugen |
| Entry standard – 6.82 | 3 | United States | Quanesha Burks; Tara Davis; Brittney Reese |
| Entry standard – 6.82 | 1 | Nigeria | Ese Brume; ~~Ruth Usoro~~ |
| Entry standard – 6.82 | 2 | Romania | Florentina Iusco; Alina Rotaru |
| Entry standard – 6.82 | 1 | Australia | Brooke Stratton |
| Entry standard – 6.82 | 1 | British Virgin Islands | Chantel Malone |
| Entry standard – 6.82 | 0 | Colombia | ~~Caterine Ibargüen~~ |
| Entry standard – 6.82 | 1 | France | Yanis David |
| Entry standard – 6.82 | 1 | Germany | Malaika Mihambo |
| Entry standard – 6.82 | 0 | Italy | ~~Larissa Iapichino~~ |
| Entry standard – 6.82 | 1 | Jamaica | Tissanna Hickling |
| Entry standard – 6.82 | 1 | ROC | Darya Klishina |
| Entry standard – 6.82 | 1 | Serbia | Ivana Španović |
| Entry standard – 6.82 | 1 | Spain | Fátima Diame |
| Entry standard – 6.82 | 1 | Sweden | Khaddi Sagnia |
| Entry standard – 6.82 | 1 | Trinidad and Tobago | Tyra Gittens |
| Entry standard – 6.82 | 1 | Ukraine | Maryna Bekh-Romanchuk |
| Entry standard – 6.82 | 1 | Uzbekistan | Darya Reznichenko |
| World ranking | 1 | Belarus | Nastassia Mironchyk-Ivanova |
| World ranking | 1 | Brazil | Eliane Martins |
| World ranking | 1 | Canada | Christabel Nettey |
| World ranking | 1 | Germany | Maryse Luzolo |
| World ranking | 1 | Hungary | Anasztázia Nguyen |
| World ranking | 1 | Jamaica | Chanice Porter |
| World ranking | 1 | Panama | Nathalee Aranda |
| Universality places | 1 | Estonia | Ksenija Balta |
| Universality places | 1 | Papua New Guinea | Rellie Kaputin |
| Total | 30 | | |

==== Women's triple jump ====
No athlete qualified by world ranking.

| Qualification standard | No. of athletes | NOC | Nominated athletes |
|---|---|---|---|
Entry standard – 14.32
| Entry standard – 14.32 | 3 | Cuba | Leyanis Pérez; Liadagmis Povea; Davisleydi Velazco |
| Entry standard – 14.32 | 3 | Kazakhstan | Irina Ektova; Mariya Ovchinnikova; Olga Rypakova |
| Entry standard – 14.32 | 3 | United States | Tori Franklin; Jasmine Moore; Keturah Orji |
| Entry standard – 14.32 | 2 | Colombia | Caterine Ibargüen; Yosiris Urrutia |
| Entry standard – 14.32 | 2 | Finland | Kristiina Mäkelä; Senni Salminen |
| Entry standard – 14.32 | 1 | France | ~~Yanis David~~; Rouguy Diallo |
| Entry standard – 14.32 | 2 | Germany | Neele Eckhardt; Kristin Gierisch |
| Entry standard – 14.32 | 2 | Jamaica | Shanieka Ricketts; Kimberly Williams |
| Entry standard – 14.32 | 2 | Portugal | Patrícia Mamona; Evelise Veiga |
| Entry standard – 14.32 | 0 | ROC | ~~Ekaterina Koneva~~; ~~Darya Nidbaykina~~ |
| Entry standard – 14.32 | 1 | Belarus | Viyaleta Skvartsova |
| Entry standard – 14.32 | 1 | Brazil | Núbia Soares |
| Entry standard – 14.32 | 1 | Bulgaria | Gabriela Petrova |
| Entry standard – 14.32 | 1 | Dominica | Thea LaFond |
| Entry standard – 14.32 | 1 | Dominican Republic | Ana José Tima |
| Entry standard – 14.32 | 1 | Ghana | Nadia Eke |
| Entry standard – 14.32 | 1 | Greece | Paraskevi Papachristou |
| Entry standard – 14.32 | 1 | Israel | Hanna Knyazyeva-Minenko |
| Entry standard – 14.32 | 1 | Italy | Dariya Derkach |
| Entry standard – 14.32 | 1 | Lithuania | Diana Zagainova |
| Entry standard – 14.32 | 0 | Nigeria | ~~Ruth Usoro~~ |
| Entry standard – 14.32 | 1 | Spain | Ana Peleteiro |
| Entry standard – 14.32 | 1 | Ukraine | Olha Saladukha |
| Entry standard – 14.32 | 1 | Uzbekistan | Roksana Khudoyarova |
| Entry standard – 14.32 | 1 | Venezuela | Yulimar Rojas |
| World ranking | 0 | | |
| Total | 34 | | |

==== Women's shot put ====
| Qualification standard | No. of athletes | NOC | Nominated athletes |
|---|---|---|---|
| Entry standard – 18.50 | 3 | China | Gao Yang; Gong Lijiao; Song Jiayuan |
| Entry standard – 18.50 | 3 | Germany | Sara Gambetta; Katharina Maisch; Christina Schwanitz |
| Entry standard – 18.50 | 3 | United States | Adelaide Aquilla; Jessica Ramsey; Raven Saunders |
| Entry standard – 18.50 | 2 | Canada | Brittany Crew; Sarah Mitton |
| Entry standard – 18.50 | 2 | Poland | Paulina Guba; Klaudia Kardasz |
| Entry standard – 18.50 | 1 | Belarus | Aliona Dubitskaya |
| Entry standard – 18.50 | 1 | Georgia | Sopo Shatirishvili |
| Entry standard – 18.50 | 1 | Great Britain | Sophie McKinna |
| Entry standard – 18.50 | 1 | Hungary | Anita Márton |
| Entry standard – 18.50 | 1 | Jamaica | Danniel Thomas-Dodd |
| Entry standard – 18.50 | 1 | Moldova | Dimitriana Surdu |
| Entry standard – 18.50 | 1 | Netherlands | Jessica Schilder |
| Entry standard – 18.50 | 1 | New Zealand | Valerie Adams |
| Entry standard – 18.50 | 1 | Portugal | Auriol Dongmo |
| Entry standard – 18.50 | 1 | Spain | María Belén Toimil |
| Entry standard – 18.50 | 1 | Sweden | Fanny Roos |
| Entry standard – 18.50 | 1 | Turkey | Emel Dereli |
| Entry standard – 18.50 | 1 | Ukraine | Ol'ha Holodna |
| World ranking | 1 | Brazil | Geisa Arcanjo |
| World ranking | 1 | Czech Republic | Markéta Červenková |
| World ranking | 1 | Jamaica | Lloydricia Cameron |
| World ranking | 1 | New Zealand | Maddison-Lee Wesche |
| World ranking | 1 | Trinidad and Tobago | Portious Warren |
| World ranking | 1 | Venezuela | Ahymará Espinoza |
| Total | 32 | | |

==== Women's discus throw ====
| Qualification standard | No. of athletes | NOC | Nominated athletes |
|---|---|---|---|
| Entry standard – 63.50 | 3 | China | Chen Yang; Feng Bin; Su Xinyue |
| Entry standard – 63.50 | 3 | Germany | Kristin Pudenz; Marike Steinacker; Claudine Vita |
| Entry standard – 63.50 | 2 | Brazil | Fernanda Martins; Andressa de Morais |
| Entry standard – 63.50 | 2 | Cuba | Denia Caballero; Yaimé Pérez |
| Entry standard – 63.50 | 2 | India | Kamalpreet Kaur; Seema Punia |
| Entry standard – 63.50 | 2 | United States | Valarie Allman; Rachel Dincoff |
| Entry standard – 63.50 | 1 | Australia | Dani Stevens |
| Entry standard – 63.50 | 1 | Croatia | Sandra Perković |
| Entry standard – 63.50 | 1 | France | Mélina Robert-Michon |
| Entry standard – 63.50 | 1 | Jamaica | Shadae Lawrence |
| Entry standard – 63.50 | 1 | Moldova | Alexandra Emilianov |
| Entry standard – 63.50 | 1 | Netherlands | Jorinde van Klinken |
| Entry standard – 63.50 | 1 | Portugal | Liliana Cá |
| Entry standard – 63.50 | 0 | ROC | ~~Yekaterina Strokova~~ |
| Entry standard – 63.50 | 1 | Ukraine | Natalia Semenova |
| World ranking | 1 | Brazil | Izabela da Silva |
| World ranking | 1 | Croatia | Marija Tolj |
| World ranking | 1 | Greece | Chrysoula Anagnostopoulou |
| World ranking | 1 | Italy | Daisy Osakue |
| World ranking | 0 | Nigeria | ~~Chioma Onyekwere~~ |
| World ranking | 1 | Portugal | Irina Rodrigues |
| World ranking | 1 | Serbia | Dragana Tomašević |
| World ranking | 1 | Thailand | Subenrat Insaeng |
| World ranking | 1 | United States | Kelsey Card |
| Universality places | 1 | Chile | Karen Gallardo |
| Total | 31 | | |

==== Women's hammer throw ====
| Qualification standard | No. of athletes | NOC | Nominated athletes |
|---|---|---|---|
| Entry standard – 72.50 | 2 | Belarus | ~~Anastasiya Kalamoyets~~; Hanna Malyshchyk; Nastassia Maslava |
| Entry standard – 72.50 | 3 | Poland | Joanna Fiodorow; Malwina Kopron; Anita Włodarczyk |
| Entry standard – 72.50 | 3 | United States | Brooke Andersen; Gwen Berry; DeAnna Price |
| Entry standard – 72.50 | 2 | China | Luo Na; Wang Zheng |
| Entry standard – 72.50 | 2 | New Zealand | Lauren Bruce; Julia Ratcliffe |
| Entry standard – 72.50 | 2 | Ukraine | Iryna Klymets; Iryna Novozhylova |
| Entry standard – 72.50 | 1 | Azerbaijan | Hanna Skydan |
| Entry standard – 72.50 | 1 | Canada | Camryn Rogers |
| Entry standard – 72.50 | 1 | Finland | Silja Kosonen |
| Entry standard – 72.50 | 1 | France | Alexandra Tavernier |
| Entry standard – 72.50 | 1 | Hungary | Réka Gyurátz |
| Entry standard – 72.50 | 1 | Latvia | Laura Igaune |
| Entry standard – 72.50 | 1 | Moldova | Zalina Petrivskaya |
| Entry standard – 72.50 | 0 | Nigeria | ~~Annette Echikunwoke~~ |
| Entry standard – 72.50 | 0 | ROC | ~~Sofiya Palkina~~ |
| Entry standard – 72.50 | 1 | Turkey | Tuğçe Şahutoğlu |
| Entry standard – 72.50 | 1 | Venezuela | Rosa Rodríguez |
| World ranking | 1 | Canada | Jillian Weir |
| World ranking | 1 | Finland | Krista Tervo |
| World ranking | 1 | Germany | Samantha Borutta |
| World ranking | 1 | Greece | Stamatia Scarvelis |
| World ranking | 1 | Italy | Sara Fantini |
| World ranking | 1 | Romania | Bianca Ghelber |
| World ranking | 1 | Slovakia | Martina Hrašnová |
| World ranking | 1 | Spain | Laura Redondo |
| Total | 31 | | |

==== Women's javelin throw ====
| Qualification standard | No. of athletes | NOC | Nominated athletes |
|---|---|---|---|
| Entry standard – 64.00 | 3 | China | Liu Shiying; Lü Huihui; ~~Yu Yuzhen~~ |
| Entry standard – 64.00 | 2 | United States | Maggie Malone; Kara Winger |
| Entry standard – 64.00 | 1 | Australia | Kelsey-Lee Barber |
| Entry standard – 64.00 | 1 | Austria | Victoria Hudson |
| Entry standard – 64.00 | 1 | Belarus | Tatsiana Khaladovich |
| Entry standard – 64.00 | 1 | Croatia | Sara Kolak |
| Entry standard – 64.00 | 1 | Czech Republic | Nikola Ogrodníková |
| Entry standard – 64.00 | 1 | Germany | Christin Hussong |
| Entry standard – 64.00 | 1 | Japan | Haruka Kitaguchi |
| Entry standard – 64.00 | 1 | Latvia | Līna Mūze |
| Entry standard – 64.00 | 1 | Poland | Maria Andrejczyk |
| Entry standard – 64.00 | 1 | Turkey | Eda Tuğsuz |
| World ranking | 2 | Australia | Mackenzie Little; Kathryn Mitchell |
| World ranking | 2 | Brazil | Laila Ferrer e Silva; Jucilene de Lima |
| World ranking | 2 | Czech Republic | Irena Gillarová; Barbora Špotáková |
| World ranking | 2 | Latvia | Anete Kociņa; Madara Palameika |
| World ranking | 1 | Canada | Elizabeth Gleadle |
| World ranking | 1 | Colombia | María Lucelly Murillo |
| World ranking | 1 | Hungary | Réka Szilágyi |
| World ranking | 1 | India | Annu Rani |
| World ranking | 1 | Lithuania | Liveta Jasiūnaitė |
| World ranking | 1 | Serbia | Marija Vučenović |
| World ranking | 1 | Slovenia | Martina Ratej |
| World ranking | 1 | South Africa | Jo-Ane van Dyk |
| World ranking | 1 | United States | Ariana Ince |
| Total | 32 | | |

== Combined events ==
=== Men's decathlon ===
Entry number: 24.

| Qualification standard | No. of athletes | NOC | Nominated athletes |
|---|---|---|---|
Entry standard – 8350
| Entry standard – 8350 | 3 | Estonia | Johannes Erm; Karel Tilga; Maicel Uibo |
| Entry standard – 8350 | 3 | United States | Steve Bastien; Garrett Scantling; Zach Ziemek |
| Entry standard – 8350 | 2 | Australia | Cedric Dubler; Ashley Moloney |
| Entry standard – 8350 | 2 | Canada | Pierce Lepage; Damian Warner |
| Entry standard – 8350 | 2 | Germany | Niklas Kaul; Kai Kazmirek |
| Entry standard – 8350 | 1 | Belgium | Thomas Van der Plaetsen |
| Entry standard – 8350 | 1 | Brazil | Felipe dos Santos |
| Entry standard – 8350 | 1 | France | Kevin Mayer |
| Entry standard – 8350 | 1 | Grenada | Lindon Victor |
| Entry standard – 8350 | 1 | ROC | Ilya Shkurenyov |
| World ranking | 2 | Czech Republic | Adam Sebastian Helcelet; Jiří Sýkora |
| World ranking | 1 | Belarus | Vital Zhuk |
| World ranking | 0 | Netherlands | ~~Pieter Braun~~ |
| World ranking | 1 | Norway | Martin Roe |
| World ranking | 1 | Poland | Paweł Wiesiołek |
| World ranking | 1 | Spain | Jorge Ureña |
| Total | 23 | | |

=== Women's heptathlon ===
| Qualification standard | No. of athletes | NOC | Nominated athletes |
|---|---|---|---|
| Entry standard – 6420 | 3 | United States | Erica Bougard; Annie Kunz; Kendell Williams |
| Entry standard – 6420 | 2 | Austria | Ivona Dadic; Verena Preiner |
| Entry standard – 6420 | 1 | Belgium | Nafissatou Thiam |
| Entry standard – 6420 | 1 | Cuba | Yorgelis Rodríguez |
| Entry standard – 6420 | 1 | Germany | Carolin Schäfer |
| Entry standard – 6420 | 1 | Great Britain | Katarina Johnson-Thompson |
| Entry standard – 6420 | 1 | Hungary | Xénia Krizsán |
| Entry standard – 6420 | 0 | Latvia | ~~Laura Ikauniece~~ |
| Entry standard – 6420 | 1 | Netherlands | Anouk Vetter |
| World ranking | 2 | Netherlands | Nadine Broersen; Emma Oosterwegel |
| World ranking | 1 | Belgium | Noor Vidts |
| World ranking | 1 | Benin | Odile Ahouanwanou |
| World ranking | 1 | Burkina Faso | Marthe Koala |
| World ranking | 1 | Canada | Georgia Ellenwood |
| World ranking | 1 | China | Zheng Ninali |
| World ranking | 1 | Colombia | Evelis Aguilar |
| World ranking | 1 | Finland | Maria Huntington |
| World ranking | 1 | Germany | Vanessa Grimm |
| World ranking | 1 | Poland | Adrianna Sułek |
| World ranking | 1 | Spain | María Vicente |
| World ranking | 1 | Uzbekistan | Ekaterina Voronina |
| Total | 24 | | |

== Relay events ==
- World Athletics press release

Each relay team will be composed of 5 athletes (4 athletes for the mixed teams, 2 men and 2 women). Athletes already qualified for the 100 m and 400 m events are automatically included in their respective relay teams.

=== Men's 4 × 100 m relay ===
Entry number: 16 teams of 5 athletes each (80). By Finishing Position at Designated Competitions: 12 By Top List: 4 (all marks made in 2019).

| Qualification standard | No. of teams | Qualified teams |
|---|---|---|
| 2019 World Championships in Athletics; Finalists | 8 | Brazil; China; France; Great Britain; Japan; Netherlands; South Africa; United States |
| 2021 World Athletics Relays; Finalists | 4 | Denmark; Germany; Ghana; Italy |
| World Athletics Top List (as of 29 June 2021) | 4 | Canada; Jamaica; Trinidad and Tobago; Turkey |
| Total | 16 | |

=== Men's 4 × 400 m relay ===
Entry number: 16 teams of 5 athletes each (80).

| Qualification standard | No. of teams | Qualified teams |
|---|---|---|
| 2019 World Championships in Athletics; Finalists | 8 | Belgium; Colombia; France; Great Britain; Italy; Jamaica; Trinidad and Tobago; United States |
| 2021 World Athletics Relays; Finalists | 4 | Botswana; Japan; Netherlands; South Africa |
| World Athletics Top List (as of June 29, 2021) | 4 | Czech Republic; Germany; India; Poland |
| Total | 16 | |

=== Women's 4 × 100 m relay ===
| Qualification standard | No. of teams | Qualified teams |
|---|---|---|
| 2019 World Championships in Athletics; Finalists | 8 | China; Germany; Great Britain; Italy; Jamaica; Switzerland; Trinidad and Tobago; United States |
| 2021 World Athletics Relays; Finalists | 6 | Denmark; Ecuador; France; Japan; Netherlands; Poland |
| World Athletics Top List (as of June 29, 2021) | 2 | Brazil; Nigeria |
| Total | 16 | |

=== Women's 4 × 400 m relay ===
| Qualification standard | No. of teams | Qualified teams |
|---|---|---|
| 2019 World Championships in Athletics; Finalists | 8 | Belgium; Canada; Great Britain; Jamaica; Netherlands; Poland; Ukraine; United States |
| 2021 World Athletics Relays; Finalists | 4 | Cuba; France; Germany; Italy |
| World Athletics Top List (as of June 29, 2021) | 4 | Australia; Bahamas; Belarus; Switzerland |
| Total | 16 | |

=== Mixed 4 × 400 m relay ===
Entry number: 16 teams of 4 athletes each, 2 men and 2 women (64).

| Qualification standard | No. of teams | Qualified teams |
|---|---|---|
| 2019 World Championships in Athletics; Finalists | 7 | ~~Bahrain~~; Belgium; Brazil; Great Britain; India; Jamaica; Poland; United States |
| 2021 World Athletics Relays; Finalists | 5 | Dominican Republic; Ireland; Italy; Netherlands; Spain |
| World Athletics Top List (as of June 29, 2021) | 3 | Germany; Nigeria; Ukraine |
| Total | 15 | |

== See also ==
- Athletics at the 2020 Summer Paralympics – Qualification

== Notes ==
1. a: These NOCs have qualified more than 3 athletes for the corresponding individual event. It is the NOC's responsibility to choose up to 3 athletes among those who qualified for the same event.
1. Note RUS: As World Athletics, due to the Russian doping scandal, continues to ban Russian athletes to compete under the Russian flag, it is not clear which flag they compete under and whether it would be lifted until the 2020 Olympics or not. On 30 April 2021, WA announced that the status of Authorised Neutral Athletes (ANA) will be granted to some Russian athletes (4 athletes initially), but in any case no more than 10 ANA athletes will be entered at the Olympic Games.
