= Jhonatan Amores =

Ecuadorian racewalker (born 1998)

Personal information
- Full name: Jhonatan Javier Amores Carua
- Nationality: Ecuadorian
- Born: 29 August 1998 (age 27)

Sport
- Sport: Athletics
- Event: Racewalking
Medal record
Pan American Cup
Gold medal – first place	2021 Guayaquil	Men's 50 km

Jhonatan Javier Amores Carua (Note: In this Spanish name, the first or paternal surname is Amores and the second or maternal family name is Carua.) (born 29 August 1998) is an Ecuadorian racewalking athlete. He qualified to represent Ecuador at the 2020 Summer Olympics in Tokyo 2021, competing in men's 50 kilometres walk.

In 2021, Amores also competed for Ecuador at the Pan American Walking Cup, earning a gold medal in the men's 50 km event.
