= Gurpreet Singh (race walker) =

Indian racewalker

Gurupreet Singh
Personal information
- Born: 9 July 1984 (age 41)

Sport
- Country: India
- Sport: Track and field
- Event: Racewalking

Gurpreet Singh is an Indian racewalker. He qualified for the Tokyo Olympics 2020 after winning the Indian 50km racewalking championship with a time of 3:59:42 (his personal best). He competed in the 50km racewalking event in the Tokyo Olympics, but failed to finish due to cramps, withdrawing after 35km.
