= Jorge Armando Ruiz =

Colombian racewalker (born 1989)

Personal information
- Born: 17 May 1989 (age 37) Barbosa, Colombia

Sport
- Sport: Race walking
Medal record
Representing Colombia
Central American and Caribbean Games
Silver medal – second place	2018 Barranquilla	50 km walk

Jorge Armando Ruiz Fajardo (born 17 May 1989 in Barbosa) is a Colombian racewalker. He placed 17th in the men's 50 kilometres walk at the 2016 Summer Olympics. In 2021, he represented Colombia at the 2020 Summer Olympics, finishing 13th in the men's 50 kilometres walk.
