= Bian Tongda =

Chinese racewalker

Personal information
- Nationality: Chinese
- Born: 1 April 1991 (age 35)

Sport
- Sport: Athletics
- Event: Racewalking

Bian Tongda (Chinese: 边•通达; born 1 April 1991) is a Chinese racewalking athlete. In 2021, he represented China at the 2020 Summer Olympics in Tokyo, placing 7th in the men's 50 kilometres walk.
