= Rahul Rohilla =

Indian racewalker

Rahul Rohilla (born 5 July 1996 in Haryana) is an Indian racewalker.

== 2020 Summer Olympics ==
Rohilla qualified for the Men's 20 km walk at the 2020 Olympics with a time of 1:20:26, finishing second in the qualifying event, and will represent India in the 2020 Summer Olympics in Tokyo. He finished 47th in the event.
