= Naganathan Pandi =

Indian Olympic sprinter

Naganathan Pandi (born on 23 April 1996) is an Indian athlete and police constable from Tamil Nadu. He had been selected to represent India at the 2020 Summer Olympics at the event of Men's 4 × 400m Relay.

== See also ==
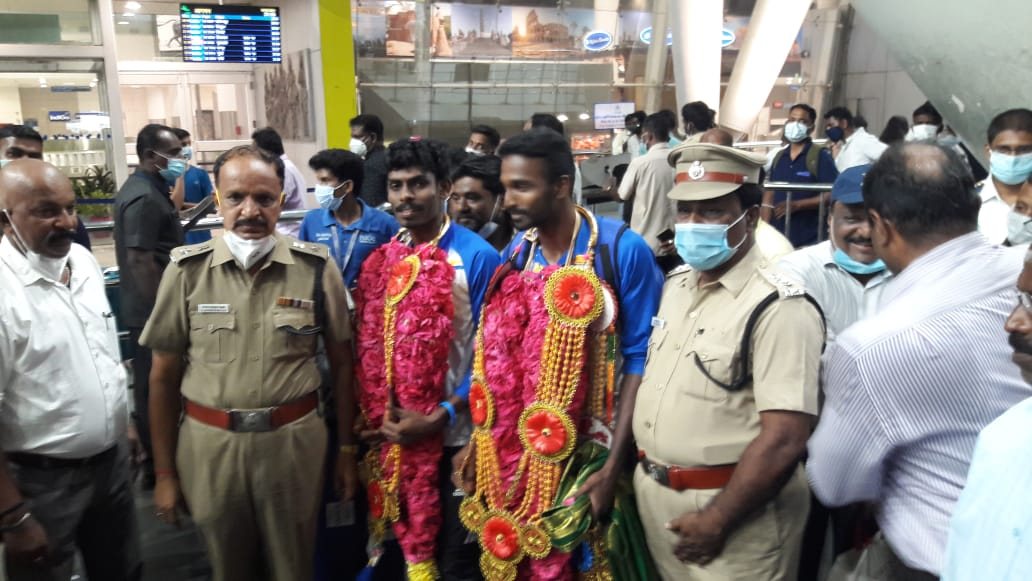
Naganathan Pandi

- India at the 2020 Summer Olympics
