= India at the 2020 Summer Olympics =

- IOC code: IND
- NOC: Indian Olympic Committee
- Website: olympic.ind.in

in Tokyo, Japan July 23, 2021 – August 8, 2021
- Competitors: 119 in 18 sports
- Flag bearers (opening): Mary Kom; Manpreet Singh
- Flag bearer (closing): Bajrang Punia
- Medals Ranked 48th: Gold 1 Silver 2 Bronze 4 Total 7

Summer Olympics appearances (overview)
- 1900; 1904–1912; 1920; 1924; 1928; 1932; 1936; 1948; 1952; 1956; 1960; 1964; 1968; 1972; 1976; 1980; 1984; 1988; 1992; 1996; 2000; 2004; 2008; 2012; 2016; 2020; 2024

India competed at the 2020 Summer Olympics in Tokyo, Japan. Originally scheduled to take place in July–August 2020, the games were postponed to 23 July to 8 August 2021, due to the COVID-19 pandemic. The Games marked the nation's 25th appearance at the Summer Olympics after having made its official debut at the 1900 Summer Olympics.

India sent its largest-ever contingent consisting of 119 athletes competing across 18 sports in the Games. India entered an athlete for the fencing event for the first time in the Games history. The Games also marked the first time the nation qualified multiple athletes for sailing and achieved a direct qualification for swimming event. Mary Kom and Manpreet Singh were the flag-bearers for the opening ceremony and Bajrang Punia carried the flag during the closing ceremony.

This was also the most successful Games for India with seven medals including one gold, two silver and four bronze. The lone gold medal won by Neeraj Chopra was India's first ever in athletics and the second ever individual gold medal. India also won its first ever silver medal in weight lifting. The men's national field hockey team won the bronze medal to record their first Olympic medal since 1980. The team also recorded its third boxing medal ever and fifth and sixth Olympic medals in wrestling.

== Background ==
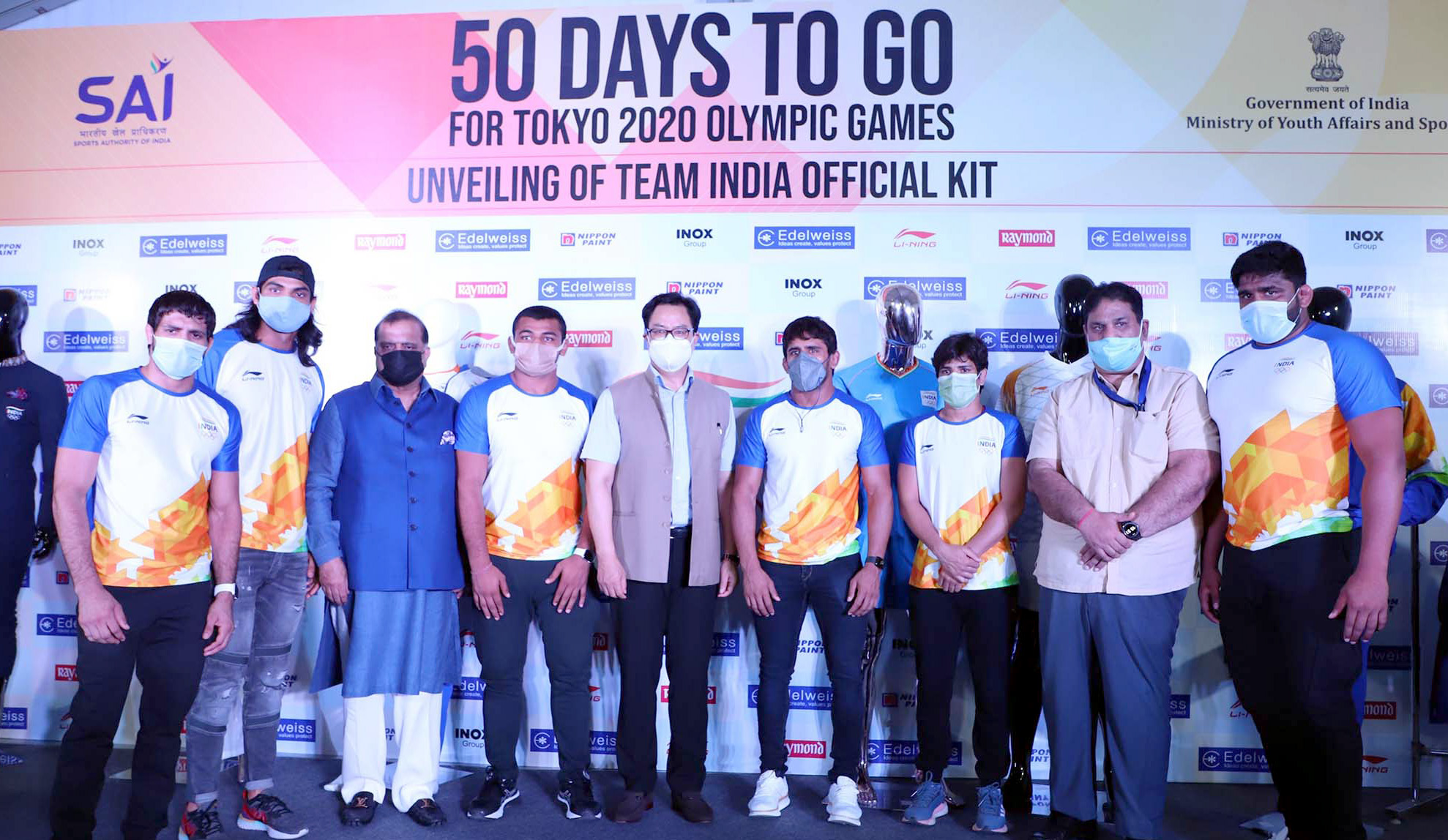
Minister of Sports Kiren Rijiju with the athletes during the unveiling of the official kit in New Delhi on 3 June 2021

The Indian Olympic Association was recognized by the International Olympic Committee in 1927. The nation made its Summer Olympics debut in the 1900 Olympics at Paris with a lone athlete participating in the Games. By the time the IOA was established, India had already competed in two more Summer Olympic Games in 1920, and 1924. Indian athletes have appeared in every edition of the Summer Olympic Games since 1920 and this edition of the Games marked the nation's 25th appearance at the Summer Olympics. Originally scheduled to take place from 24 July to 9 August 2020, the games were postponed to 23 July to 8 August 2021 due to the COVID-19 pandemic.

The Indian contingent for the games consisted of 228 people and was its largest ever for the Summer Games. It included 119 athletes, who competed across 18 sports and other support staff. Biren Prasad Baishya served as the chef de mission. The official kit for the Games was unveiled in New Delhi on 3 June 2021. The first batch of 88 personnel including 54 athletes reached the Games village in Tokyo on 18 July 2021.

Mary Kom and Manpreet Singh were the flag-bearers for the opening ceremony held on 23 July 2021 at the Olympic Stadium in Tokyo. Bajrang Punia was the flag-bearer for the closing ceremony held on 8 August 2021 at the same venue.

== Competitors ==
There were 119 athletes who took part in 65 medal events across 18 sports.

Competitors representing India
Sport	Men	Women	Total
Archery	3	1	4
Athletics	15	8	23
Badminton	3	1	4
Boxing	5	4	9
Equestrian	1	0	1
Fencing	0	1	1
Field hockey	16	16	32
Golf	2	2	4
Gymnastics	0	1	1
Judo	0	1	1
Rowing	2	0	2
Sailing	3	1	4
Shooting	8	7	15
Swimming	2	1	3
Table tennis	2	2	4
Tennis	1	2	3
Weightlifting	0	1	1
Wrestling	3	4	7
Total	66	53	119

== Medal summary ==
India achieved its most successful performance in a single Games with seven medals including one gold, two silver and four bronze. Neeraj Chopra won gold in the men's javelin throw, thereby winning India's first ever gold medal in athletics. This was also India's second ever individual gold medal after Abhinav Bindra won gold in shooting in 2008. This was also India's first athletics medal since its first appearance as an independent nation in 1948, and its third overall after Norman Pritchard's silver medals in 1900.

With her silver medal in the women's 49 kg event, Saikhom Mirabai Chanu won India's first ever silver medal in weight lifting, and its first medal in the sport since 2000. P. V. Sindhu won a bronze in women's badminton singles event. Having won the silver medal in the same event in 2016, she became the first Indian female athlete and second Indian to win medals in consecutive Summer Games in individual events. The men's national field hockey team won the bronze medal to record their first Olympic medal since 1980. Lovlina Borgohain won a bronze in the women's welterweight category in boxing, thereby becoming only the third Indian to win a boxing medal at the Games after Vijender Singh in 2008 and Mary Kom in 2012. Ravi Kumar Dahiya and Bajrang Punia won silver and bronze respectively in the men's freestyle wrestling for India's fifth and sixth Olympic medals in the sport.

== Medalists ==
List of medal winners
Medal	Name	Sport	Event	Date
Gold	Neeraj Chopra	Athletics	Men's javelin throw	7 August
Silver	Saikhom Mirabai Chanu	Weightlifting	Women's 49 kg	24 July
Silver	Ravi Kumar Dahiya	Wrestling	Men's freestyle 57 kg	5 August
Bronze	P. V. Sindhu	Badminton	Women's singles	1 August
Bronze	Lovlina Borgohain	Boxing	Women's welterweight	4 August
Bronze	India men's national field hockey team: Dilpreet Singh; Rupinder Pal Singh; Shamsher Singh; Manpreet Singh (C); Hardik Singh; Gurjant Singh; Simranjeet Singh; Mandeep Singh; Harmanpreet Singh; Lalit Upadhyay; P. R. Sreejesh; Sumit Walmiki; Nilakanta Sharma; Surender Kumar; Varun Kumar; Birendra Lakra; Amit Rohidas; Vivek Prasad	Field hockey	Men's tournament	5 August
Bronze	Bajrang Punia	Wrestling	Men's freestyle 65 kg	7 August

=== Medals by sport ===
Medals by sport
Sport	Gold	Silver	Bronze	Total
Athletics	1	0	0	1
Badminton	0	0	1	1
Boxing	0	0	1	1
Field hockey	0	0	1	1
Weightlifting	0	1	0	1
Wrestling	0	1	1	2
Total	1	2	4	7

=== Medals by gender ===
Medals by gender
Gender	Gold	Silver	Bronze	Total
Male	1	1	2	4
Female	0	1	2	3
Total	1	2	4	7

== Archery ==
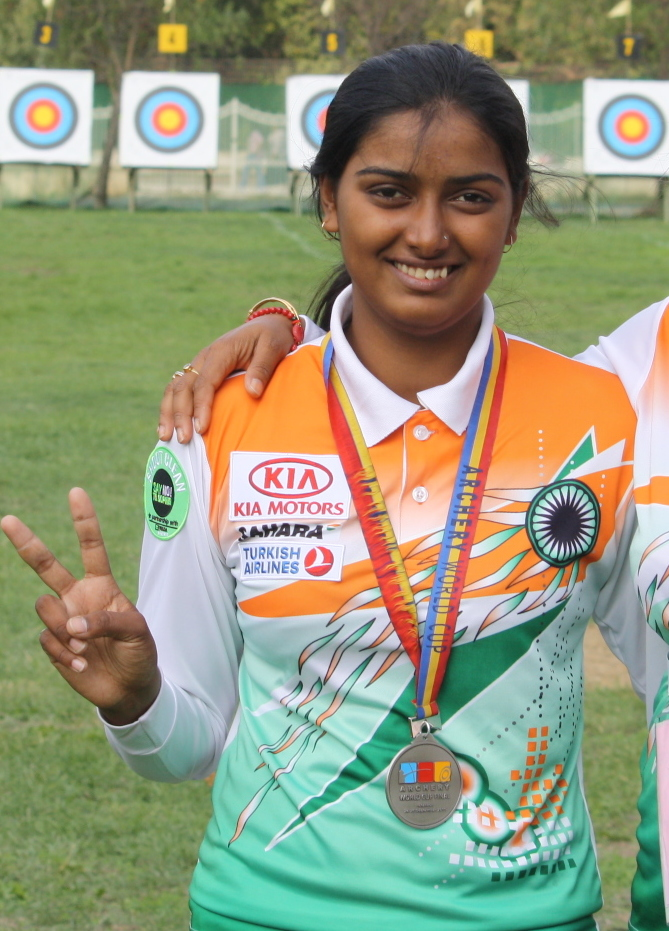
Deepika Kumari was the lone Indian woman archer at the Games and competed in her third consecutive Olympics.

As per World Archery, each National Olympic Committee (NOC) could enter a maximum of six competitors with three per gender. NOCs that qualified teams were also allowed to have each member compete in the individual event with the remaining spots filled by individual qualification tournaments.

The Indian men's team qualified for the team event by winning the silver medal at the 2019 World Archery Championships held at 's-Hertogenbosch, Netherlands in June 2019. Deepika Kumari was the only Indian women archer to qualify for the Games. She beat compatriot Ankita Bhakat to claim the final Olympic quota spot in the recurve qualification event held at the 2019 Asian Archery Championships in Bangkok, Thailand in November 2019. The Indian archery squad was officially announced on 8 March 2021, consisting of the men's team of Atanu Das, Pravin Jadhav and Tarundeep Rai and the lone woman archer Kumari, with the last two participating in their third Olympic Games.

The ranking rounds were held at the Yumenoshima Park in Tokyo on 23 July 2021. In the men's individual ranking rounds, Jadhav was the highest placed Indian with 656 points in 31st place followed by Das in 35th and Rai in 37th. Their combined score resulted in ninth seed for the team event. Kumari was seeded ninth for the women's individual event with Jadhav and Kumari combining to be seeded at ninth for the mixed team event.

In the mixed team event held on 24 July, India defeated Chinese Taipei in the round of 16 before losing to eventual gold medalists South Korea in the quarterfinals. In the men's team event held on 26 July, the Indian team achieved a similar result, losing to eventual gold medalists South Korea in the quarterfinals after having overcome Kazakhstan in the round of 16. In the men's individual events, Jadhav and Rai did not progress beyond the round of 32 while Das lost in the round of 16 to Takaharu Furukawa of Japan after winning his initial two bouts. In the women's individual event, Kumari won her first two rounds by point scores before she beat Ksenia Perova by a single arrow shoot off in the next round. In the quarterfinals, she lost to eventual gold medalist An San of South Korea.

Athlete	Event	Ranking round		Round of 64	Round of 32	Round of 16	Quarterfinals	Semifinals	Final / BM	
Athlete	Event	Score	Seed	Opposition Score	Opposition Score	Opposition Score	Opposition Score	Opposition Score	Opposition Score	Rank
Atanu Das	Men's individual	653	35	Deng Y-c (TPE); W 6–4	Oh J-h (KOR); W 6–5	Furukawa (JPN); L 4–6	Did not advance			
Pravin Jadhav	Men's individual	656	31	Bazarzhapov (ROC); W 6–0	Ellison (USA); L 0–6	Did not advance				
Tarundeep Rai	Men's individual	652	37	Hunbin (UKR); W 6–4	Shanny (ISR); L 5–6	Did not advance				
Atanu Das; Pravin Jadhav; Tarundeep Rai	Men's team	1961	9	—N/a		Kazakhstan; W 6–2	South Korea; L 0–6	Did not advance		
Deepika Kumari	Women's individual	663	9	Karma (BHU); W 6–0	Mucino-Fernandez (USA); W 6–4	Perova (ROC); W 6–5	An S (KOR); L 0–6	Did not advance		
Pravin Jadhav; Deepika Kumari	Mixed team	1319	9 Q	—N/a		Chinese Taipei; W 5–3	South Korea; L 2–6	Did not advance		

Legend:Q = Qualified for the next phase; W = Win; L = Loss

== Athletics ==
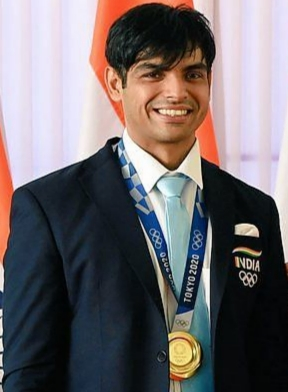
Neeraj Chopra won the men's javelin throw event for India's lone gold medal at the Games and the first ever in athletics.

As per the governing body World Athletics (WA), a NOC was allowed to enter up to three qualified athletes in each individual event and one qualified relay team if the Olympic Qualifying Standards (OQS) for the respective events had been met during the qualifying period. The remaining places were allocated based on the World Athletics Rankings which were derived from the average of the best five results for an athlete over the designated qualifying period, weighted by the importance of the meet.

Indian qualified nine athletes for individual track events, seven for field events and two relay teams. Irfan Kolothum Thodi was the first Indian athlete who qualified for the Games after he achieved the qualification time for the men's 20 km walk event at the Asian Race-Walking Championships at Nomi, Japan in March 2019. Indian duo of Sandeep Kumar and Rahul Rohilla qualified for the same event after they achieved the qualification standard of 1:21.00 at the National Race-Walking Championships in 2021. Bhawna Jat was the first Indian woman athlete to secure qualification for the Games after she clocked a time of 1:29:54 at the 2020 National championships to finish within the OQS of 1:31:00 for the women's 20 km walk event. Priyanka Goswami clocked 1:28:45 when she won the National championships in 2021 to qualify for the same event. Dutee Chand qualified for the women's 100 m and 200 m events on the basis of her world ranking of 47 and 59 respectively. Avinash Sable achieved the qualification standard of 8:22.00 for the men's 3000 m steeple chase when he clocked 8:21.37 in the IAAF World Athletics Championships in Doha, Qatar. M. P. Jabir and Gurpreet Singh qualified for the men's 400 m hurdles and men's 50 km walk events respectively through their respective world rankings.

In the field events, Neeraj Chopra and Shivpal Singh attained the qualification standard of 85 meters (m) for the men's javelin throw event with throws of 87.86 m and 85.47 m respectively at the ACNW League Meeting held at Potchefstroom, South Africa in January 2021. Murali Sreeshankar made the cut for the men's long jump after he surpassed the qualification standard of 8.22 m with an 8.26 m jump in the Federation Cup event in March 2021. In the same competition, Kamalpreet Kaur breached the Olympic qualification standard of 63 m with a throw of 65.06 m in the women's discus throw. Seema Punia achieved the qualification standard for the same event with a throw of 63.72 on the deadline day on 29 June 2021. Tajinderpal Singh Toor qualified for the men's shot put after achieving the Olympic standard with an Asian record throw of 21.49 m in the Indian Grand Prix event in June 2021. Annu Rani qualified for the women's javelin throw event by virtue of her world ranking. India also entered relay teams in the men's and mixed 4 X 400 m relay events.

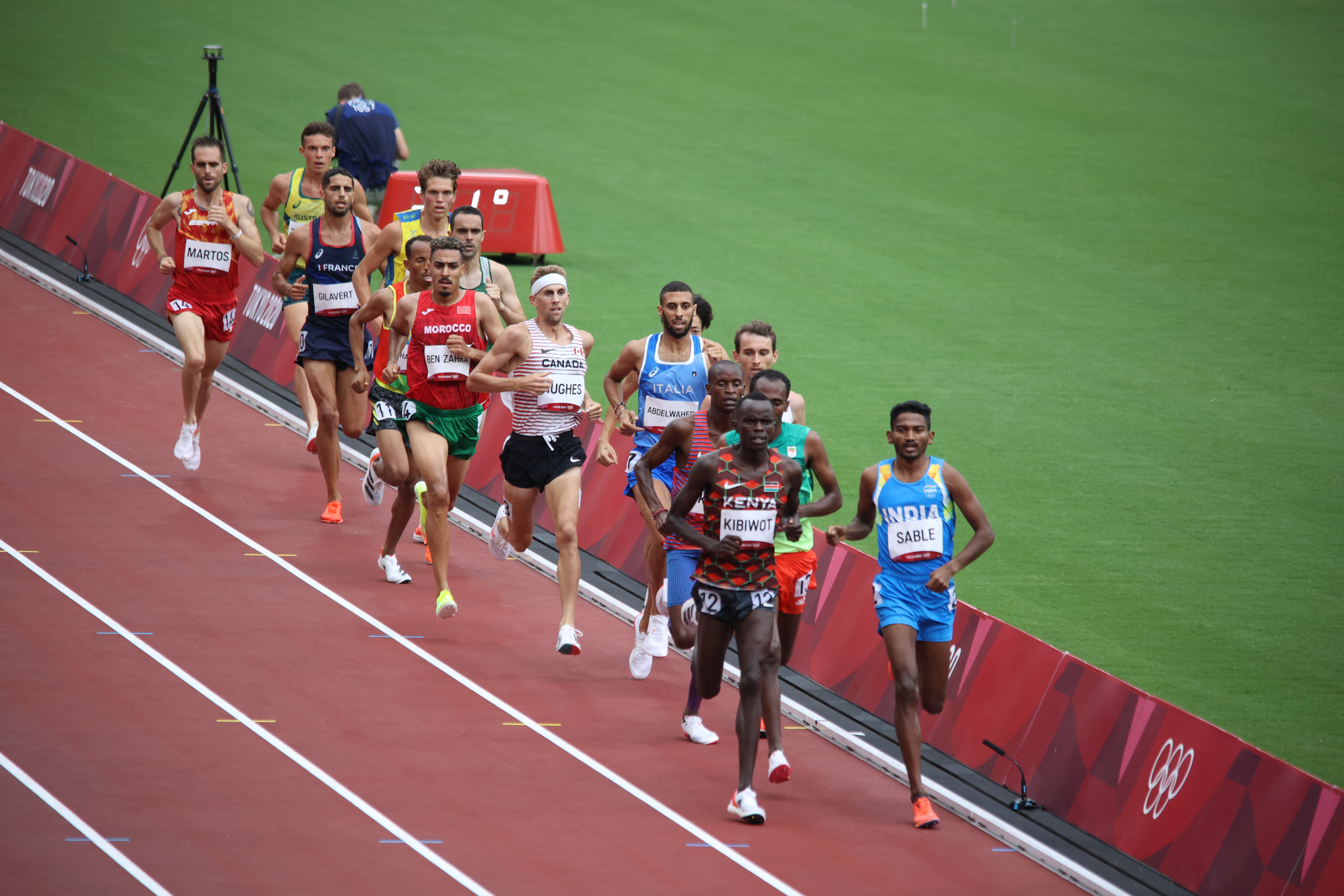
Avinash Sable (right) at the 3000m steeplechase event, where he established a new national record.

Road events took place at Odori Park in Sapporo and the National Stadium was the venue of all the track and field events. In the race walking events, none of the Indians achieved a medal with Goswmani being the best finisher in 17th in the women's 20 km event. In the track events, Chand and Jabir failed to progress beyond the initial rounds in their respective events. In the men's steeple chase event, Sable clocked a time of 8:18.12 to set a new national record but failed to progress to the next stage. The Indian mixed relay team also failed to progress to the final after finishing last i n their heats. In the men's relay event, the Indian team set a new Asian record with a time of 3:00.25 but finished fourth in their heats to miss the qualification by less than a second.

In the field events, Sreeshankar, Toor and Shivpal Singh did not progress beyond the qualification groups in their respective events. Likewise, in the women's events, Punia and Rani failed to progress to the finals. In the women's discus, Kaur made it to the finals after her 64 m throw in the qualification event. In the final, she could achieve a best throw of only 63.7 m and was placed sixth in the overall classification. In the men's javelin throw, Chopra registered a best throw of 86.65 m in the qualification event to top the table. In the finals, he achieved a best throw of 87.58 m in his second attempt to win the gold medal. Chopra's medal was the first gold medal for India in athletics at the Olympic Games and the second ever individual gold after Abhinav Bindra in 2008.

Track & road events
Men

Athlete	Event	Heat		Semifinal		Final	
Athlete	Event	Result	Rank	Result	Rank	Result	Rank
M. P. Jabir	400 m hurdles	50.77	7	Did not advance			
Avinash Sable	3000 m steeplechase	8:18.12 NR	13	Did not advance			
Amoj Jacob; Naganathan Pandi*; Arokia Rajiv; Noah Nirmal Tom; Muhammed Anas	4 × 400 m relay	3:00.25 AR	9	—N/a		Did not advance	
Sandeep Kumar	20 km walk	—N/a				1:25:07	23
Rahul Rohilla	20 km walk	—N/a				1:32:06	47
Irfan Kolothum Thodi	20 km walk	—N/a				1:34:41	51
Gurpreet Singh	50 km walk	—N/a				DNF	

Women

Athlete	Event	Heat		Quarterfinal		Semifinal		Final	
Athlete	Event	Result	Rank	Result	Rank	Result	Rank	Result	Rank
Dutee Chand	100 m	Bye		11.54	7	Did not advance			
Dutee Chand	200 m	23.85	7	—N/a		Did not advance			
Priyanka Goswami	20 km walk	—N/a						1:32:36	17
Bhawna Jat	20 km walk	—N/a						1:37:38	32

Mixed

Athlete	Event	Heat		Final	
Athlete	Event	Result	Rank	Result	Rank
Muhammed Anas; Arokia Rajiv; Revathi Veeramani; Subha Venkatesan	4 × 400 m relay	3:19.93	8	Did not advance	

Field events

Athlete	Event	Qualification		Final	
Athlete	Event	Distance	Position	Distance	Position
Murali Sreeshankar	Men's long jump	7.69	25	Did not advance	
Tajinderpal Singh Toor	Men's shot put	19.99	24	Did not advance	
Neeraj Chopra	Men's javelin throw	86.65	1 Q	87.58	1st place, gold medalist(s)
Shivpal Singh	Men's javelin throw	76.40	27	Did not advance	
Kamalpreet Kaur	Women's discus throw	64.00	2 Q	63.70	6
Seema Punia	Women's discus throw	60.57	16	Did not advance	
Annu Rani	Women's javelin throw	54.04	29	did not advance	

Key

Ranks given for track events are within the athlete's heat only.

Q = Qualified for the next round; AR = Asian record; NR = National record

== Badminton ==
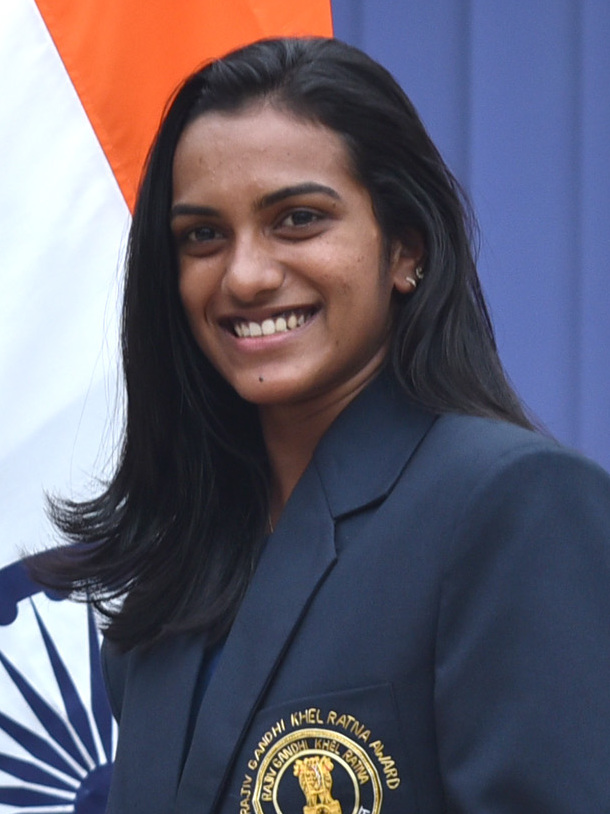
P.V.Sindhu won a bronze medal at the women's singles, her second medal after the silver at the 2016 Games.

The qualification was based on the Badminton World Federation (BWF) rankings published on 15 June 2021 for the period between 29 April 2019 and 25 April 2021. Each NOC was permitted to enter a maximum of two players each in the men's and women's singles if both were ranked in the world's top 16. Similar regulations were also applied to the doubles event with each NOC allowed to enter a maximum of two pairs if both are ranked in the top eight. The remaining NOCs were entitled to one qualified per event until the quota for the event was exhausted. However, due to the COVID-19 pandemic, BWF confirmed that the qualification period technically closed on 15 June 2021 as no further play was possible, with the qualification decided by the rankings till the date.

India qualified a lone shuttler each in the men's and women's singles. Sai Praneeth and P. V. Sindhu qualified by virtue of being placed 13th and 7th in the BWF rankings respectively. The Indian pair of Chirag Shetty and Satwiksairaj Rankireddy, who were ranked ninth, qualified for the men's doubles event. India entered all the four players who qualified for the tournament with one entry each in the men's and women's singles and a pair in the men's doubles. Sindhu had won the silver medal in the women's singles at the 2016 Games.

In the men's singles events held at Musashino Forest Sport Plaza, Sai Praneeth was eliminated from the competition after losing both his opening round matches. In the men's doubles, the Indian pair won two matches including the only victory over the eventual gold medalists Lee Yang and Wang Chi-lin of the Chinese Taipei and lost one in the group stage. The team did not progress to the next round as three teams finished with the same points and only the top two qualified based on the points difference.

In the women's singles event, Sindhu won both her group stage matches and the elimination round in straight sets. In the quarterfinals, she took the first set against two-time world champion Akane Yamaguchi of Japan. She won the second set by a scoreline of 22–20 to secure the match. In the semifinals, she lost to second seed and eventual silver medalist Tai Tzu-ying of Chinese Taipei. In the match for the third place, she beat He Bingjiao of China in straight sets to secure a bronze medal, her second medal in the Summer Olympics after the silver in the previous Games in 2016.

Athlete	Event	Group Stage				Elimination	Quarterfinal	Semifinal	Final / BM	
Athlete	Event	Opposition Score	Opposition Score	Opposition Score	Rank	Opposition Score	Opposition Score	Opposition Score	Opposition Score	Rank
B. Sai Praneeth	Men's singles	Zilberman (ISR); L (17–21, 15–21)	Caljouw (NED); L (14–21, 14–21)	—N/a	3	Did not advance				
P. V. Sindhu	Women's singles	Polikarpova (ISR); W (21–7, 21–10)	Cheung N Y (HKG); W (21–9, 21–16)	—N/a	1 Q	Blichfeldt (DEN); W (21–15, 21–13)	Yamaguchi (JPN); W (21–13, 22–20)	Tai T-y (TPE); L (18–21, 12–21)	He Bj (CHN); W (21–13, 21–15)	3rd place, bronze medalist(s)
Satwiksairaj Rankireddy; Chirag Shetty	Men's doubles	Lee Y / Wang C-l (TPE); W (21–16, 16–21, 27–25)	Gideon / Sukamuljo (INA); L (13–21, 12–21)	Lane / Vendy (GBR); W (21–17, 21–19)	3	Did not advance				

Legend: W = Win; L = Loss; Q = Qualified for the next phase

== Boxing ==
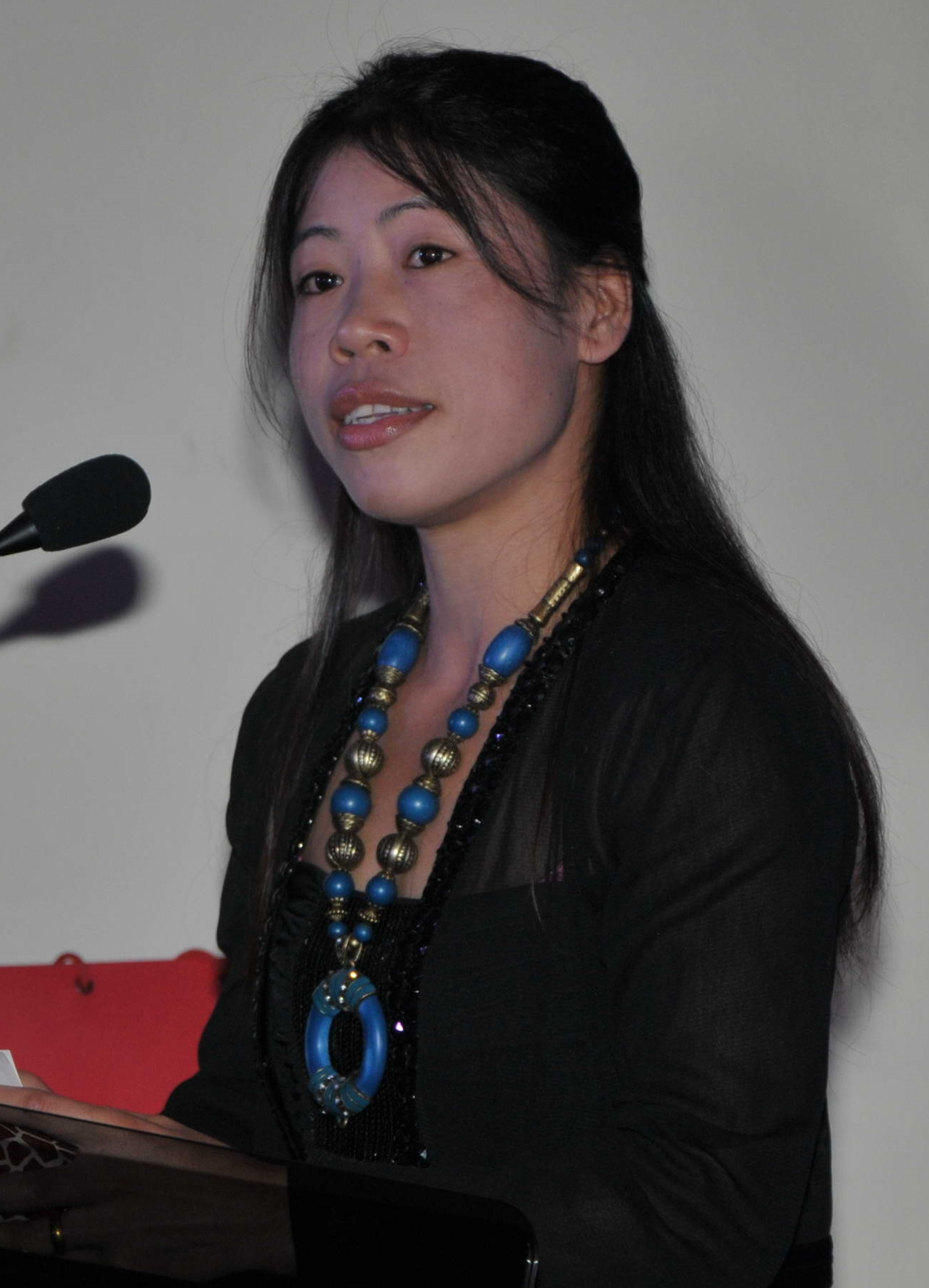
The 2020 Games marked the final participation of three time Olympian and 2012 bronze medalist, Mary Kom.

The qualification to the Olympic Games was determined by the performance of the boxers at the four continental Olympic qualifying tournaments (Africa, Americas, Asia & Oceania, and Europe) and at the World Olympic qualification tournament. The final list of qualifiers was announced on 15 July 2021.

In the men's event, India qualified five boxers Amit Panghal, Manish Kaushik, Vikas Krishan Yadav, Ashish Kumar, and Satish Kumar in the flyweight, lightweight, welterweight, middleweight, and super heavyweight categories respectively at the Olympic qualifying event for Asia/Oceania held at Amman, Jordan. Four women boxers also qualified for the Games via the same tournament. The list included 2012 bronze medalist and six-time world champion Mary Kom in the flyweight category apart from Simranjit Kaur (lightweight), Lovlina Borgohain (welterweight) and Pooja Rani (middleweight).

The boxing events took place from 24 July to 8 August 2021 at the Ryōgoku Kokugikan. In the men's events, except Satish Kumar, none of the boxers advanced past the first round. In the super heavy weight category, Kumar won his first bout against Jamaican Ricardo Brown before losing to Uzbek Bakhodir Jalolov in the next round by a unanimous point decision.

In the women's events, Kaur lost her first round bout while the other three secured victories. Kom lost her round of 16 bout to Ingrit Valencia of Colombia in a 2–3 split decision. Rani was defeated by eventual silver medalist Li Qian in the quarterfinals of the middle weight category. Borgohain won her first round against Nadine Apetz of Germany in a 3–2 split decision before defeating Chen Nien-chin of the Chinese Taipei in the quarterfinals. Though she lost against Busenaz Sürmeneli of Turkey, her performance ensured a bronze medal. She became the second Indian female boxer to win an Olympic medal after Kom.

Men

Athlete	Event	Round of 32	Round of 16	Quarterfinals	Semifinals	Final	
Athlete	Event	Opposition Result	Opposition Result	Opposition Result	Opposition Result	Opposition Result	Rank
Amit Panghal	Flyweight	Bye	Martínez (COL); L 1–4	Did not advance			
Manish Kaushik	Lightweight	L McCormack (GBR); L 1–4	Did not advance				
Vikas Krishan Yadav	Welterweight	Okazawa (JPN); L 0–5	Did not advance				
Ashish Kumar	Middleweight	Tuoheta (CHN); L 0–5	Did not advance				
Satish Kumar	Super heavyweight	Bye	Brown (JAM); W 4–1	Jalolov (UZB); L 0–5	Did not advance		

Women

Athlete	Event	Round of 32	Round of 16	Quarterfinals	Semifinals	Final	
Athlete	Event	Opposition Result	Opposition Result	Opposition Result	Opposition Result	Opposition Result	Rank
Mary Kom	Flyweight	Hernández (DOM); W 4–1	Valencia (COL); L 2–3	Did not advance			
Simranjit Kaur	Lightweight	Bye	Seesondee (THA); L 0–5	Did not advance			
Lovlina Borgohain	Welterweight	Bye	Apetz (GER); W 3–2	Chen N-c (TPE); W 4–1	Sürmeneli (TUR); L 0–5	Did not advance	3rd place, bronze medalist(s)
Pooja Rani	Middleweight	—N/a	Chaib (ALG); W 5–0	Li Q (CHN); L 0–5	Did not advance		

Legend: W = Win; L = Loss

== Equestrian ==
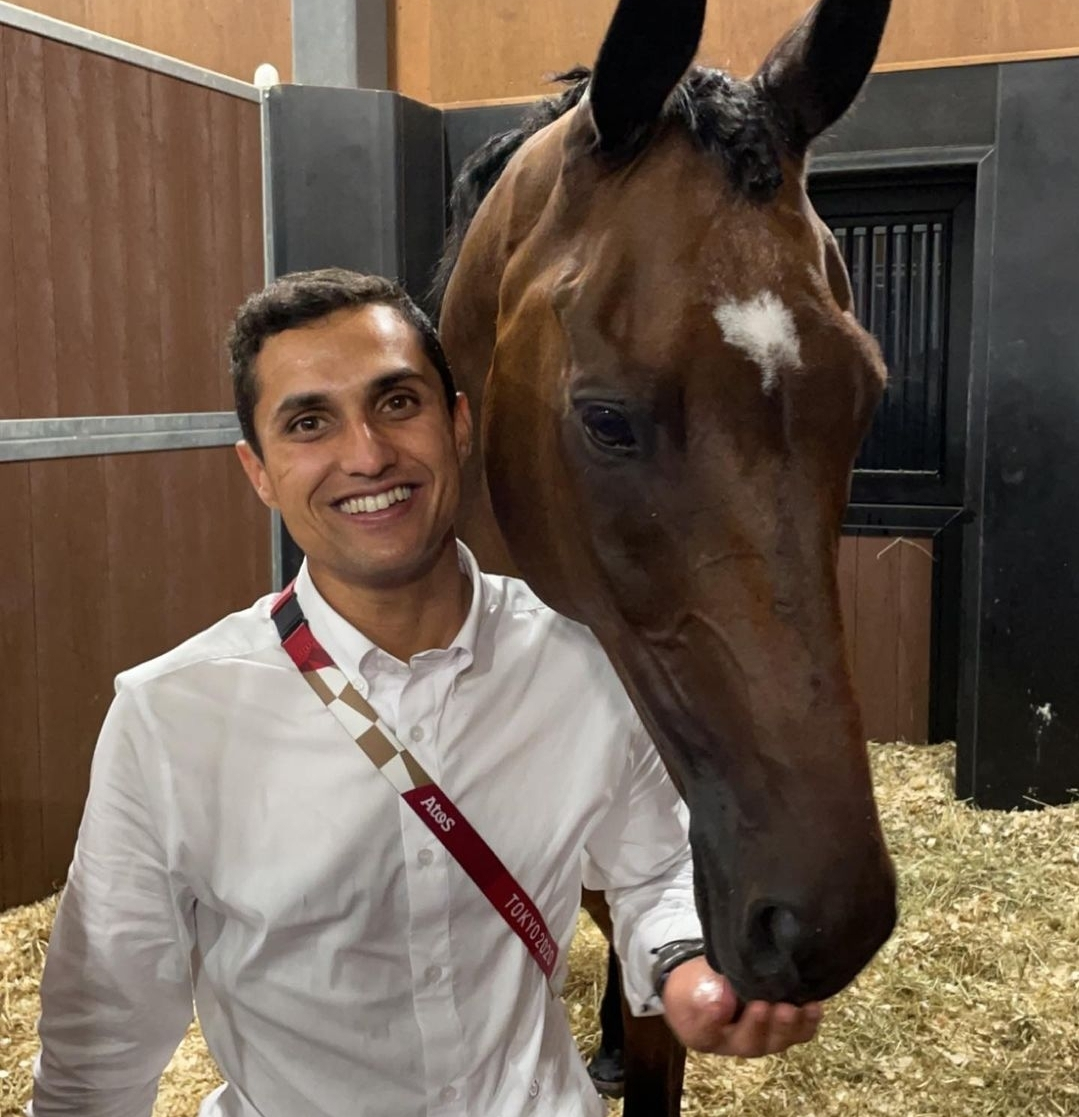
Fouaad Mirza was the third Indian ever to qualify for the Olympic equestrian competition.

As per the International Federation for Equestrian Sports (FEI), NOCs that did not qualify for the eventing team competition could earn up to two individual places based on the individual rankings. Indian rider Fouaad Mirza qualified for the individual eventing by finishing in the top two of the individual FEI Olympic rankings for Group G (Southeast Asia and Oceania).

Mirza was the third Indian ever to qualify for the Olympic equestrian competition and India entered a rider into the competition for the first time after more than two decades. The event was held at the Tokyo Equestrian Park between 29 July and 2 August. In the dressage event, Mirza finished ninth among 63 competitors with a penalty score of 28 points. In the cross-country event that followed, he acquired 11.20 points as penalties to stand 22nd after the event with a combined score of 39.2. In the final event of jumping, he accumulated further penalty scores of 20.4 over the two jumps to finish in 23rd place with an overall penalty score of 59.6.

Athlete	Horse	Event	Dressage		Cross-country		Jumping				Total	
Athlete	Horse	Event	Dressage		Cross-country		Jump 1		Jump 2		Total	
Athlete	Horse	Event	Penalties	Rank	Penalties	Rank	Penalties	Rank	Penalties	Rank	Total	Rank
Fouaad Mirza	Seigneur	Individual eventing	28.00	9	11.20	22	8.00	27	12.40	21	59.60	23

== Fencing ==
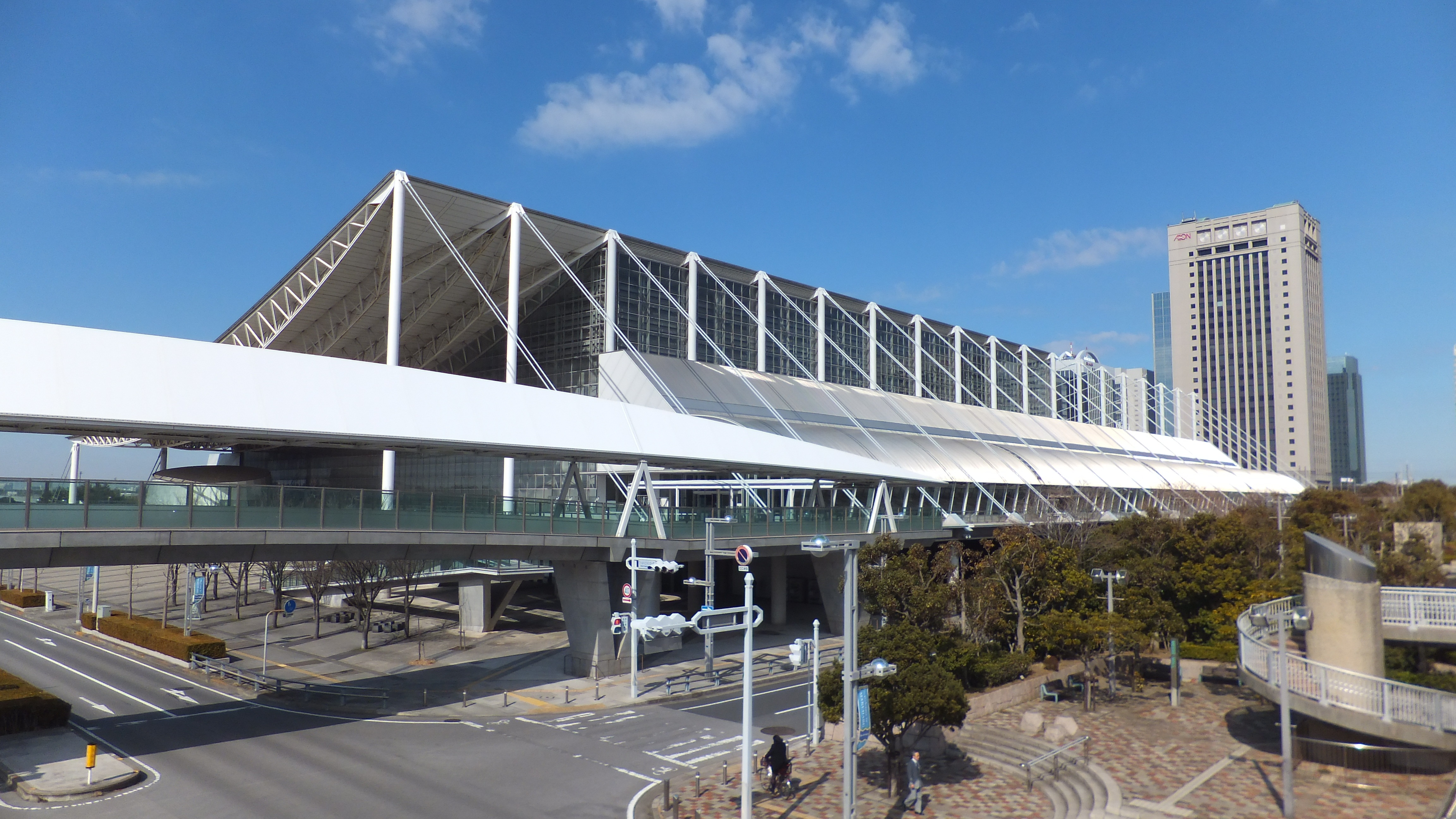
The fencing events were held at the Makuhari Messe.

In addition to individuals who have qualified for the team events, six quota places were awarded based on the Fédération Internationale d'Escrime (FIE) rankings which included the top two fencers from each of Europe and Asia-Oceania, and the top fencer from Africa and the Americas. C. A. Bhavani Devi earned a spot in the women's sabre event as one of the two highest-ranked fencers from the Asia-Oceania region in the FIE adjusted rankings. She became the first Indian fencer to qualify for the Olympic Games.

The main event was held at the Makuhari Messe on 26 July 2021. Devi defeated Nadia Ben Azizi of Tunisia in the first round by a score of 15–3. However, she was eliminated in the next round after losing to Manon Brunet of France. She trailed 2–8 going into the final round. Though she managed to secure the most points of any round in the final round, the match ended with a finals core of 15–7 in favor of the French fencer.

Athlete	Event	Round of 64	Round of 32	Round of 16	Quarterfinal	Semifinal	Final / BM	
Athlete	Event	Opposition Score	Opposition Score	Opposition Score	Opposition Score	Opposition Score	Opposition Score	Rank
C. A. Bhavani Devi	Women's sabre	Ben Azizi (TUN); W 15–3	Brunet (FRA); L 7–15	Did not advance				

Legend: W = Win; L = Loss

== Field hockey ==
Summary

Key:
- FT – After full time.
- P – Match decided by penalty-shootout.

Team	Event	Group Stage						Quarter final	Semi final	Final / BM	
Team	Event	Opposition Score	Opposition Score	Opposition Score	Opposition Score	Opposition Score	Rank	Opposition Score	Opposition Score	Opposition Score	Rank
India men	Men's tournament	New Zealand; W 3–2	Australia; L 1–7	Spain; W 3–0	Argentina; W 3–1	Japan; W 5–3	2 Q	Great Britain; W 3–1	Belgium; L 2–5	Germany; W 5–4	3rd place, bronze medalist(s)
India women	Women's tournament	Netherlands; L 1–5	Germany; L 0–2	Great Britain; L 1–4	Ireland; W 1–0	South Africa; W 4–3	4 Q	Australia; W 1–0	Argentina; L 1–2	Great Britain; L 3–4	4

=== Men's tournament ===
As per the International Hockey Federation (FIH), teams were allowed to qualify basis continental games (2018 Asian Games for Asia) and the 2019 Men's FIH Olympic Qualifiers. The men's team qualified by securing one of the seven spots available at the Olympic qualifiers at Bhubaneswar after they defeated Russia in a playoff. Hockey India announced the 16-member hockey team for the Games on 18 June 2021, which included ten Olympic debutants.

The main event was held from 24 July to 5 August 2021 at the Oi Hockey Stadium with the matches held behind closed doors. India was placed in pool A in the group stage. In the group stage, India scored a narrow one goal victory over New Zealand in the first match before losing heavily to Australia in the second match by a scoreline of 1–7. The Indian team recovered to score three consecutive victories against Spain, Argentina and hosts Japan. The team qualified for the quarter-finals after being placed second in the group. India won 3–1 against Great Britain in the quarter-finals before losing 2–5 to Belgium in the semi-finals. In the bronze medal match against Germany, India trailed 1–3 early in the game before outscoring the opponent in the second half to win the match. This was the country's first medal in the sport in more than 40 years after the gold at the 1980 Games.

Team roster

The squad was announced on 18 June 2021.

Head coach: Graham Reid

No.	Pos.	Player	Date of birth (age)	Caps	Goals	Club
2	FW	Dilpreet Singh	12 November 1999 (aged 21)	44	18	(India) Petroleum Sports Promotion Board
3	DF	Rupinder Pal Singh	11 November 1990 (aged 30)	216	115	(India) Indian Overseas Bank
6	DF	Surender Kumar	23 November 1993 (aged 27)	135	3	Food Corporation of India
7	MF	Manpreet Singh (Captain)	26 June 1992 (aged 29)	269	22	(India) Punjab Armed Police
8	MF	Hardik Singh	23 September 1998 (aged 22)	39	1	(India) Petroleum Sports Promotion Board
9	FW	Gurjant Singh	26 January 1995 (aged 26)	47	15	(India) Petroleum Sports Promotion Board
10	FW	Simranjeet Singh	27 December 1996 (aged 24)	47	13	(India) Petroleum Sports Promotion Board
11	FW	Mandeep Singh	25 January 1995 (aged 26)	159	82	(India) Petroleum Sports Promotion Board
13	DF	Harmanpreet Singh	6 January 1996 (aged 25)	119	74	(India) Petroleum Sports Promotion Board
14	FW	Lalit Upadhyay	1 December 1993 (aged 27)	108	26	(India) Petroleum Sports Promotion Board
16	GK	P. R. Sreejesh	8 May 1988 (aged 33)	236	0	(India) Kerala
17	MF	Sumit Walmiki	20 December 1996 (aged 24)	66	2	(India) Petroleum Sports Promotion Board
18	MF	Nilakanta Sharma	2 May 1995 (aged 26)	59	11	(India) Petroleum Sports Promotion Board
21	FW	Shamsher Singh	29 July 1997 (aged 23)	6	1	(India) Punjab National Bank
22	DF	Varun Kumar	25 July 1995 (aged 25)	85	22	(India) Petroleum Sports Promotion Board
26	DF	Birendra Lakra	3 February 1990 (aged 31)	197	10	(India) Petroleum Sports Promotion Board
30	DF	Amit Rohidas	10 May 1993 (aged 28)	97	17	(India) Petroleum Sports Promotion Board
32	MF	Vivek Prasad	25 February 2000 (aged 21)	62	15	(India) Petroleum Sports Promotion Board

Group play

Pos	Team	Pld	W	D	L	GF	GA	GD	Pts	Qualification
1	Australia	5	4	1	0	22	9	+13	13	Quarter-finals
2	India	5	4	0	1	15	13	+2	12	Quarter-finals
3	Argentina	5	2	1	2	10	11	−1	7	Quarter-finals
4	Spain	5	1	2	2	9	10	−1	5	Quarter-finals
5	New Zealand	5	1	1	3	11	16	−5	4	
6	Japan (H)	5	0	1	4	10	18	−8	1	

Source: Tokyo 2020 and FIH
Rules for classification: 1) points; 2) matches won; 3) goal difference; 4) goals for; 5) head-to-head result; 6) field goals scored.
(H) Hosts

24 July 2021
10:00
v

New Zealand	2–3	India
Russell 6'; Jenness 43'	Report	Rupinder 10'; Harmanpreet 26', 33'

South Pitch
Umpires:
Martin Madden (SCO)
Coen van Bunge (NED)

25 July 2021
18:30
v

India	1–7	Australia
Dilpreet 34'	Report	Beale 10'; Hayward 21'; Ogilvie 23'; Beltz 26'; Govers 40', 42'; Brand 51'

North Pitch
Umpires:
Ben Göntgen (GER)
Marcin Grochal (POL)

27 July 2021
10:00
v

India	3–0	Spain
Simranjeet 14'; Rupinder 15', 51'	Report

South Pitch
Umpires:
Jakub Mejzlík (CZE)
Peter Wright (RSA)

29 July 2021
09:30
v

India	3–1	Argentina
Varun 43'; Vivek 58'; Harmanpreet 59'	Report	Casella 48'

North Pitch
Umpires:
Jakub Mejzlík (CZE)
Ben Göntgen (GER)

30 July 2021
18:30
v

Japan	3–5	India
Ke. Tanaka 19'; Watanabe 33'; Murata 59'	Report	Harmanpreet 13'; Gurjant 17', 56'; Shamsher 34'; Nilakanta 51'

North Pitch
Umpires:
David Tomlinson (NZL)
Lim Hong Zhen (SGP)

Quarterfinal

1 August 2021
21:00
v

India	3–1	Great Britain
Dilpreet 7'; Gurjant 16'; Hardik 57'	Report	Ward 45'

Umpires:
Marcin Grochal (POL)
Simon Taylor (NZL)

Semifinal

3 August 2021
10:30
v

India	2–5	Belgium
Harmanpreet 7'; Mandeep 8'	Report	Luypaert 2'; Hendrickx 19', 49', 53'; Dohmen 60'

Umpires:
Ben Göntgen (GER)
Coen van Bunge (NED)

Bronze medal game

5 August 2021
10:30
v

Germany	4–5	India (bronze)
Oruz 2'; Wellen 24'; Fürk 25'; Windfeder 48'	Report	Simranjeet 17', 34'; Hardik 27'; Harmanpreet 29'; Rupinder 31'

Umpires:
Adam Kearns (AUS)
Simon Taylor (NZL)

=== Women's tournament ===
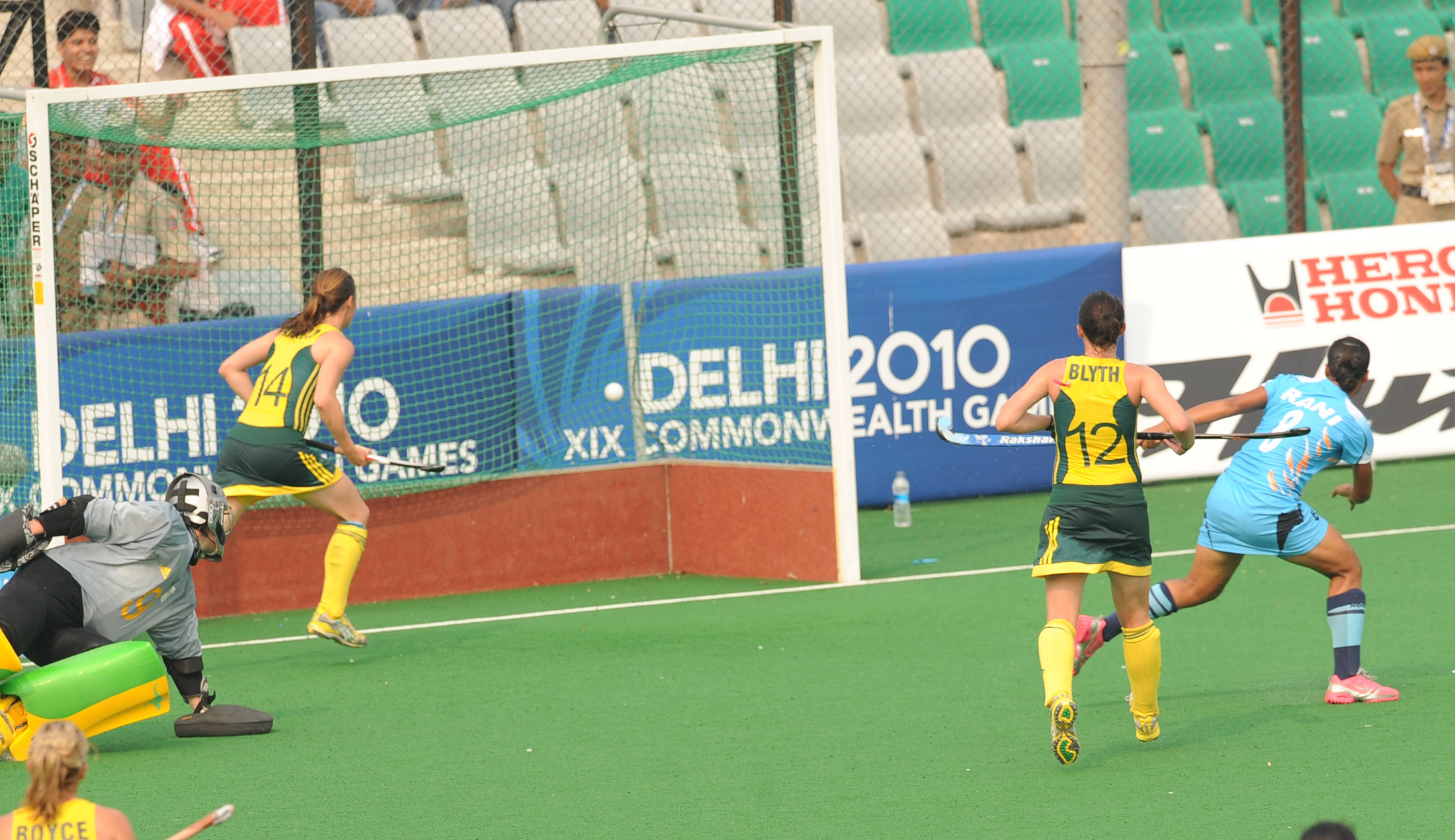
Rani Rampal (in blue) led the India women's national field hockey team to its best ever finish in the Summer Games.

As per the qualification system published by the FIH, similar to men's qualification, teams were allowed to qualify basis continental games (2018 Asian Games for Asia) and the 2019 Women's FIH Olympic Qualifiers. The women's team qualified for the Olympics by securing one of the seven spots available at the Olympic qualifiers. India defeated United States in a playoff at the qualifiers to secure the berth.

India was placed in pool A in the group stage. In the group stage, India lost the first three matches against Netherlands, Germany and Great Britain. India achieved two narrow victories by one goal margins over Ireland and South Africa to finish fourth in the group stage. India won a 1–0 victory against Australia in the quarter-finals before they lost to Argentina in the semi-finals by a scoreline of 1-2. In the bronze medal match against Great Britain, India led 3–2 before losing by a scoreline of 3–4 to miss out on a medal. This was Indian women's team's best ever performance in the Olympic Games.

Team roster

The squad was announced on 17 June 2021.

Head coach: (Netherlands) Sjoerd Marijne

No.	Pos.	Player	Date of birth (age)	Caps	Club
1	MF	Navjot Kaur	7 March 1995 (aged 26)	172	(India) Railway Sports Promotion Board
2	DF	Gurjit Kaur	25 October 1995 (aged 25)	87	(India) Railway Sports Promotion Board
3	DF	Deep Grace Ekka	3 June 1994 (aged 27)	202	(India) Railway Sports Promotion Board
4	MF	Monika Malik	5 November 1993 (aged 27)	150	(India) Hockey Haryana
7	FW	Sharmila Devi	10 October 2001 (aged 19)	9	(India) Hockey Him
8	DF	Nikki Pradhan	8 December 1993 (aged 27)	104	(India) Railway Sports Promotion Board
11	GK	Savita Punia	11 July 1990 (aged 31)	202	(India) Hockey Haryana
15	MF	Nisha Warsi	9 July 1995 (aged 26)	9	(India) Railway Sports Promotion Board
16	FW	Vandana Katariya	15 April 1992 (aged 29)	240	(India) Railway Sports Promotion Board
18	DF	Udita Duhan	14 January 1998 (aged 23)	32	(India) Hockey Haryana
20	FW	Lalremsiami	30 March 2000 (aged 21)	64	(India) Railway Sports Promotion Board
25	FW	Navneet Kaur	26 January 1996 (aged 25)	79	(India) Railway Sports Promotion Board
27	MF	Sushila Chanu	25 February 1992 (aged 29)	181	(India) Railway Sports Promotion Board
28	FW	Rani Rampal (Captain)	4 December 1994 (aged 26)	241	(India) Hockey Haryana
30	MF	Salima Tete	27 December 2001 (aged 19)	29	(India) Hockey Jharkhand
32	MF	Neha Goyal	15 November 1995 (aged 25)	75	(India) Railway Sports Promotion Board

Group play

Pos	Team	Pld	W	D	L	GF	GA	GD	Pts	Qualification
1	Netherlands	5	5	0	0	18	2	+16	15	Quarterfinals
2	Germany	5	4	0	1	13	7	+6	12	Quarterfinals
3	Great Britain	5	3	0	2	11	5	+6	9	Quarterfinals
4	India	5	2	0	3	7	14	−7	6	Quarterfinals
5	Ireland	5	1	0	4	4	11	−7	3	
6	South Africa	5	0	0	5	5	19	−14	0	

Source: Tokyo 2020 and FIH
Rules for classification: 1) points; 2) matches won; 3) goal difference; 4) goals for; 5) head-to-head result; 6) field goals scored.

24 July 2021
20:45
v

Netherlands	5–1	India
Albers 6', 43'; Van Geffen 33'; Matla 45'; Van Maasakker 52'	Report	Rani 10'

North Pitch
Umpires:
Carolina de la Fuente (ARG)
Amber Church (NZL)

26 July 2021
21:15
v

Germany	2–0	India
Lorenz 12'; Schröder 35'	Report

South Pitch
Umpires:
Sarah Wilson (GBR)
Emi Yamada (JPN)

28 July 2021
10:00
v

Great Britain	4–1	India
Martin 2', 19'; Owsley 41'; Balsdon 57'	Report	Sharmila 23'

South Pitch
Umpires:
Laurine Delforge (BEL)
Aleisha Neumann (AUS)

30 July 2021
11:45
v

Ireland	0–1	India
	Report	Navneet 57'

North Pitch
Umpires:
Aleisha Neumann (AUS)
Annelize Rostron (RSA)

31 July 2021
12:15
v

India	4–3	South Africa
Vandana 4', 17', 49'; Neha 32'	Report	Glasby 15'; Hunter 30'; Marais 39'

South Pitch
Umpires:
Amber Church (NZL)
Liu Xiaoying (CHN)

Quarterfinal

2 August 2021
12:00
v

Australia	0–1	India
	Report	Gurjit 22'

Umpires:
Carolina de la Fuente (ARG)
Irene Presenqui (ARG)

Semifinal

4 August 2021
19:00
v

Argentina	2–1	India
Barrionuevo 18', 37'	Report	Gurjit 2'

Umpires:
Amber Church (NZL)
Sarah Wilson (GBR)

Bronze medal game

6 August 2021
10:30
v

(bronze) Great Britain	4–3	India
Rayer 16'; Robertson 24'; Pearne-Webb 35'; Balsdon 48'	Report	Gurjit 25', 26'; Vandana 29'

Umpires:
Michelle Joubert (RSA)
Michelle Meister (GER)

== Golf ==
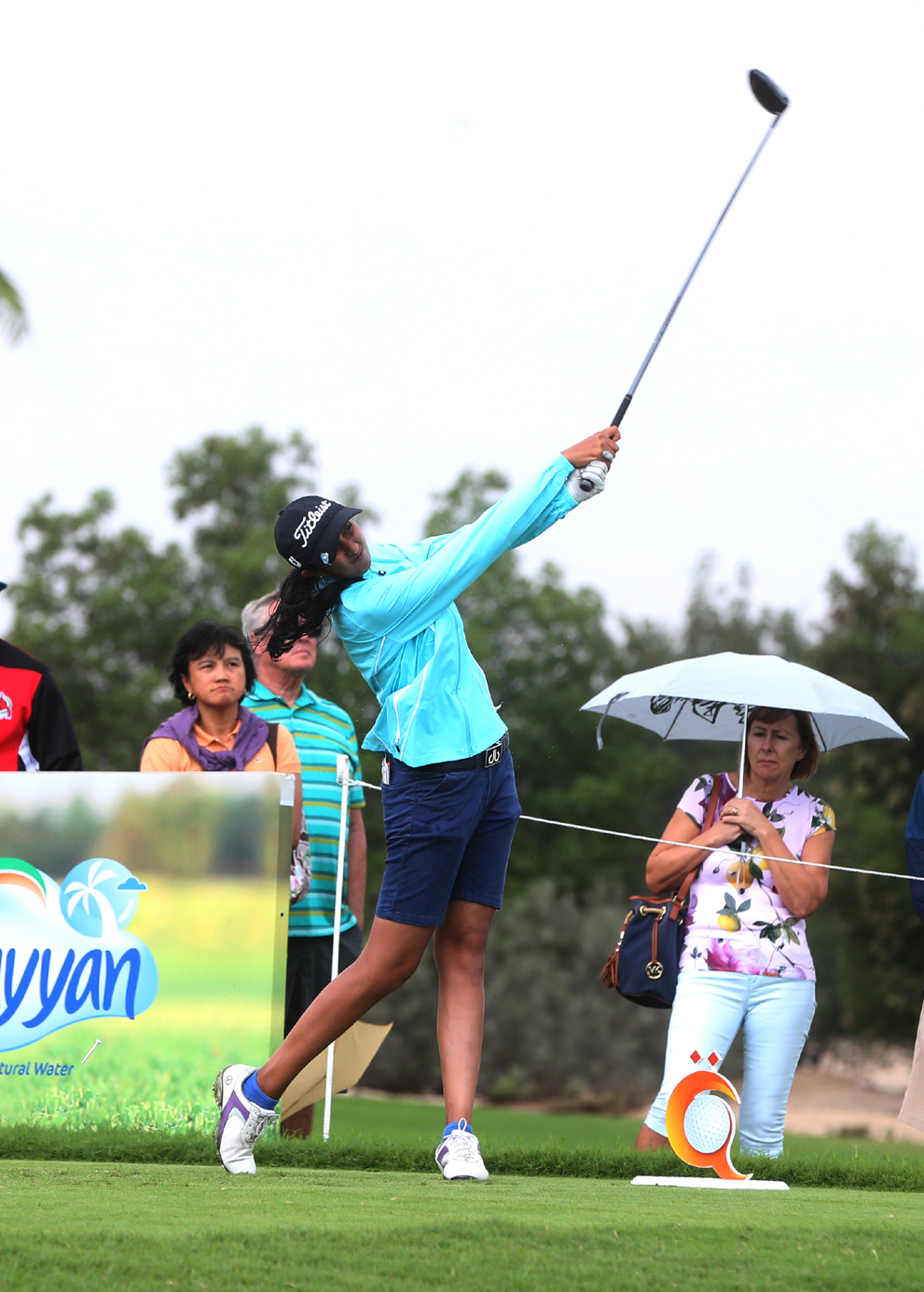
Aditi Ashok, competing in her second Games, narrowly missed out on a medal to finish fourth in the women's individual event.

The qualification to golfing events was based on the International Golf Federation (IGF) Official World Golf Ranking for men and Women's World Golf Rankings for women as of 21 June 2021 and 28 June 2021 respectively, with a total of 60 players qualifying in each of the men's and women's events. The top 15 players qualified directly with a limit of four golfers per NOC. The remaining spots went to the highest-ranked players from NOCs that did not already have two golfers qualified, with a limit of two per NOC.

Two male golfers Anirban Lahiri, and Udayan Mane garnered the final two qualifying spots based on the above criteria. Female golfer Aditi Ashok qualified through her ranking based on the qualification criteria. On 28 July 2021, Indian golfer Diksha Dagar received an invitation from the IGF to compete in the women's individual event following a late withdrawal of South African golfer Paula Reto. India sent four golfers to the Games, the maximum that was possible under the IGF guidelines with Ashok and Lahiri participating in their second Olympic Games.

The men's individual event was held between 29 July and 1 August followed by the women's individual events between 4 and 7 August at the Kasumigaseki Country Club. In the men's event, Lahiri had a good first round shooting five under par to be ranked tied eighth. But a poor second round pushed him down the order before a brief recovery with a four under par score in the third round. He eventually finished tied 42nd after an on par fourth round with an overall score of 279 (five under par). Mane had the worst first round scoring four over par to be ranked last amongst the 60 participants and never recovered. Though he fared better in the next three rounds, he finished tied 50th with a combined score of six over par.

In the women's event, Ashok had a brilliant first round scoring five under par to be ranked tied second. She retained her second place in the next two rounds with a combined score of nine under par after the third round. But in the last round, she slipped to fourth after she missed a birdie on the 17th hole and eventually shot a score of 68. She finished with a combined score of 269 (15 under par) and just outside the medal positions in fourth. Dagar had a sub-par outing and finished tied 50th with a score of 290 (six over par).

Athlete	Event	Round 1	Round 2	Round 3	Round 4	Total		
Athlete	Event	Score	Score	Score	Score	Score	Par	Rank
Anirban Lahiri	Men's individual	67	72	68	72	279	−5	T42
Udayan Mane	Men's individual	76	69	70	72	287	+3	56
Aditi Ashok	Women's individual	67	66	68	68	269	−15	4
Diksha Dagar	Women's individual	76	72	72	70	290	+6	T50

Legend: T = Tied

== Gymnastics ==
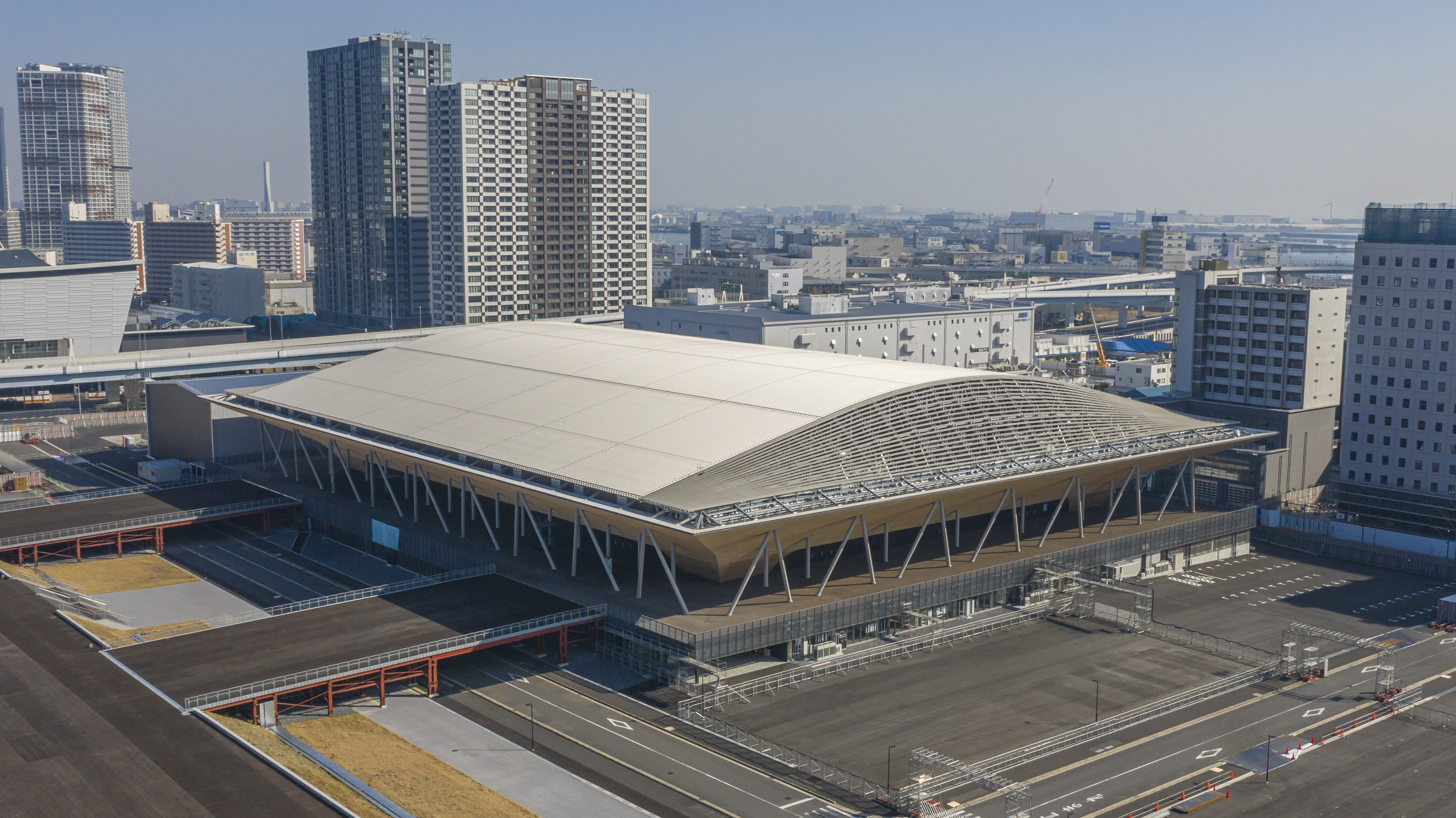
The gymnastics events were held at the Ariake Gymnastics Centre.

As per the International Gymnastics Federation (FIG), NOCs that have qualified teams were allowed to enter four members the individual events. A maximum of two further places were allocated based on an aggregate of scores achieved over the Artistic Gymnastics World Cup series and the various continental artistic gymnastics championships. Indian gymnast Pranati Nayak secured the last of two available berths in the women's individual all-around competition from the Asian region based on the 2020 Continental Championships. Nayak became the second Indian ever to participate in the gymnastics competition at the Olympics after Dipa Karmakar in the previous games.

The qualification for the main event was held on 25 July at the Ariake Gymnastics Centre. In the vaulting event, she attempted a vault with a difficulty rating of five and was placed 56th amongst 85 competitors with a score of 13.466. In the other three events, she was ranked in the eighties. She finished with a combined score of 42.565 to be ranked 79th in the final classification and did not qualify for the final.

Athlete	Event	Qualification										Final	
Athlete	Event	Vault		Uneven bars		Balance beam		Floor exercise		Total	Rank	Total	Rank
Athlete	Event	Score	Rank	Score	Rank	Score	Rank	Score	Rank	Total	Rank	Total	Rank
Pranati Nayak	Women's artistic individual all-around	13.466	56	9.033	81	9.433	82	10.633	80	42.565	79	Did not advance	

== Judo ==
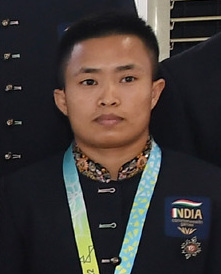
Shushila Likmabam was the lone Indian judoka at the Games

Each NOC could enter a maximum of 14 judokas for the event with one in each weight division. The qualification was determined by the world ranking list prepared by International Judo Federation (IJF) as on 28 June 2021. The top 18 were awarded straight quotas apart from continental quotas that were awarded by IJF. The entire Indian contingent had to withdraw from the Asia-Oceania Olympic qualifiers at Bishkek due to few members testing positive for COVID-19.

As per the final qualification list published on 5 July, one Indian judoka Shushila Likmabam was awarded an entry in the women's 48 kg category. She qualified under the continental quota as one of the top two ranked Asians outside the top 18 of the rankings and was the lone Indian judoka at the Games.

The main event was held on 24 July at the Nippon Budokan. Likmabam competed against Eva Csernoviczki of Hungary in the round of 32. She lost the bout after the opponent scored an ippon and was eliminated from the competition.

Athlete	Event	Round of 32	Round of 16	Quarterfinals	Semifinals	Repechage	Final / BM	Rank
Athlete	Event	Opposition Result	Opposition Result	Opposition Result	Opposition Result	Opposition Result	Opposition Result	Rank
Shushila Likmabam	Women's −48 kg	Csernoviczki (HUN); L 00–10	Did not advance					

Legend: W = Win; L = Loss

== Rowing ==
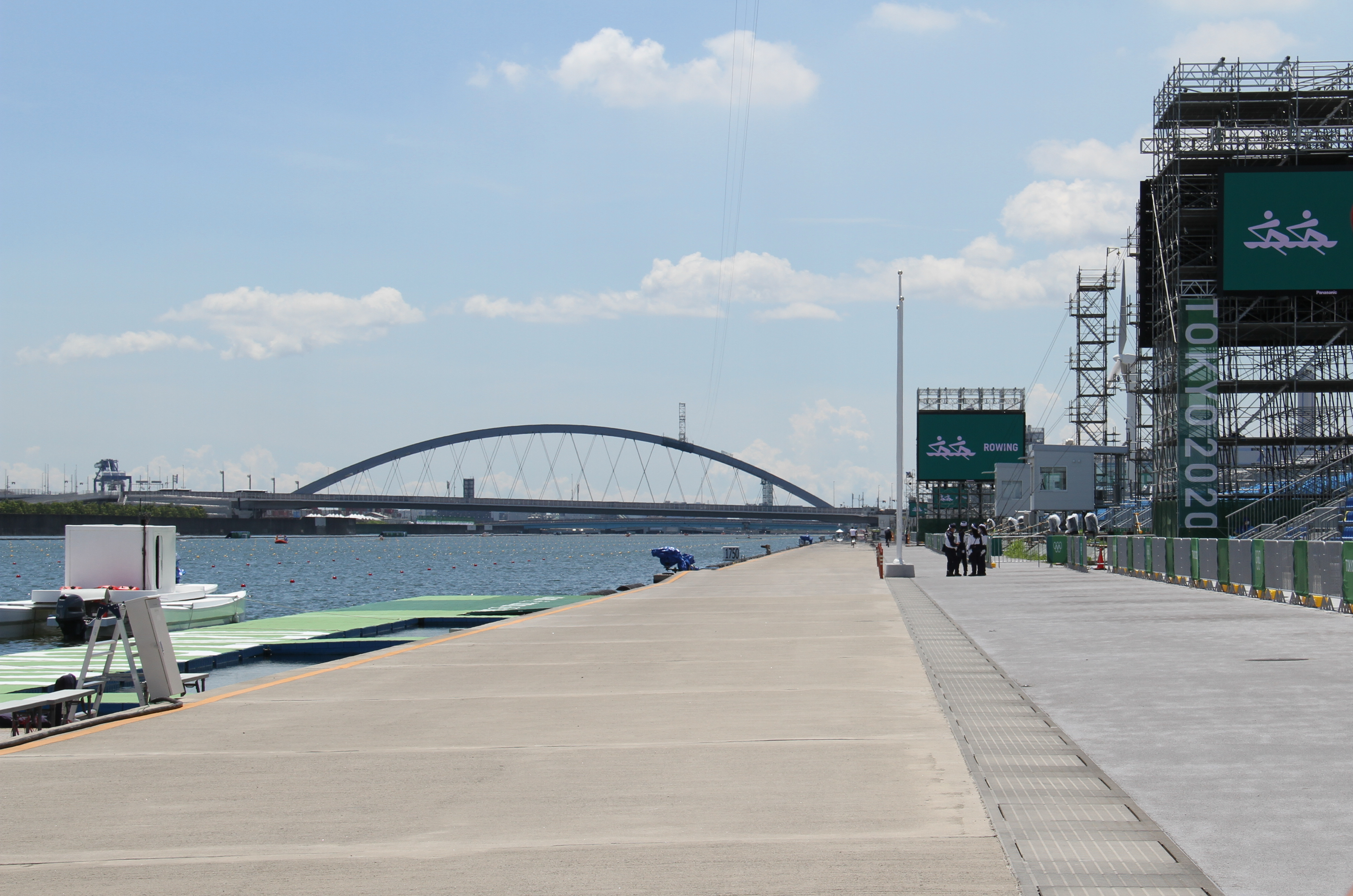
The rowing events took place at the Sea Forest Waterway.

As per the World Rowing Federation (FISA), the initial qualifying spots were awarded to the NOCs based on results at the 2019 World Rowing Championships held in Ottensheim, Austria from 25 August to 1 September 2019. At the championships, countries qualified boats rather than crews and were allowed to make crew changes for the Olympics for the qualified boats. Berths were also distributed to the nations at the four continental qualifying regattas in Asia and Oceania, Africa, Latin America, and Europe before the final unallocated berths were distributed at the Olympic Qualification Regatta held in Lucerne, Switzerland in May 2021. All qualifying NOCs were limited to one berth per event, and only NOCs with fewer than two berths from the World Championships were allowed to compete in the continental qualifying regattas. India qualified one boat in the men's lightweight double sculls for the Games by winning the silver medal and securing the first of three berths available at the 2021 FISA Asia & Oceania Olympic Qualification Regatta held at Tokyo in May 2021.

The main event took place at the took place between 24 and 29 July at the Sea Forest Waterway in Tokyo Bay. Indian rowers Arjun Lal and Arvind Singh finished fifth in the opening heats to move into the repechage rounds. The Indian team finished third in the repechage round to move into semifinals "A/B", where they ended in sixth to qualify for the final "B". The pair clocked just under six minutes and 30 seconds in the finals to be placed 11th place overall, the best ever finish for India at the rowing competition at the Summer Games.

Athlete	Event	Heats		Repechage		Semifinals		Final	
Athlete	Event	Time	Rank	Time	Rank	Time	Rank	Time	Rank
Arjun Lal; Arvind Singh	Men's lightweight double sculls	6:40.33	5 R	6:51.36	3 SA/B	6:24:41	6 FB	6:29.66	11

Legend: FB = Final B (non-medal); SA/B = Semifinals A/B; QF = Quarterfinals; R = Repechage

== Sailing ==
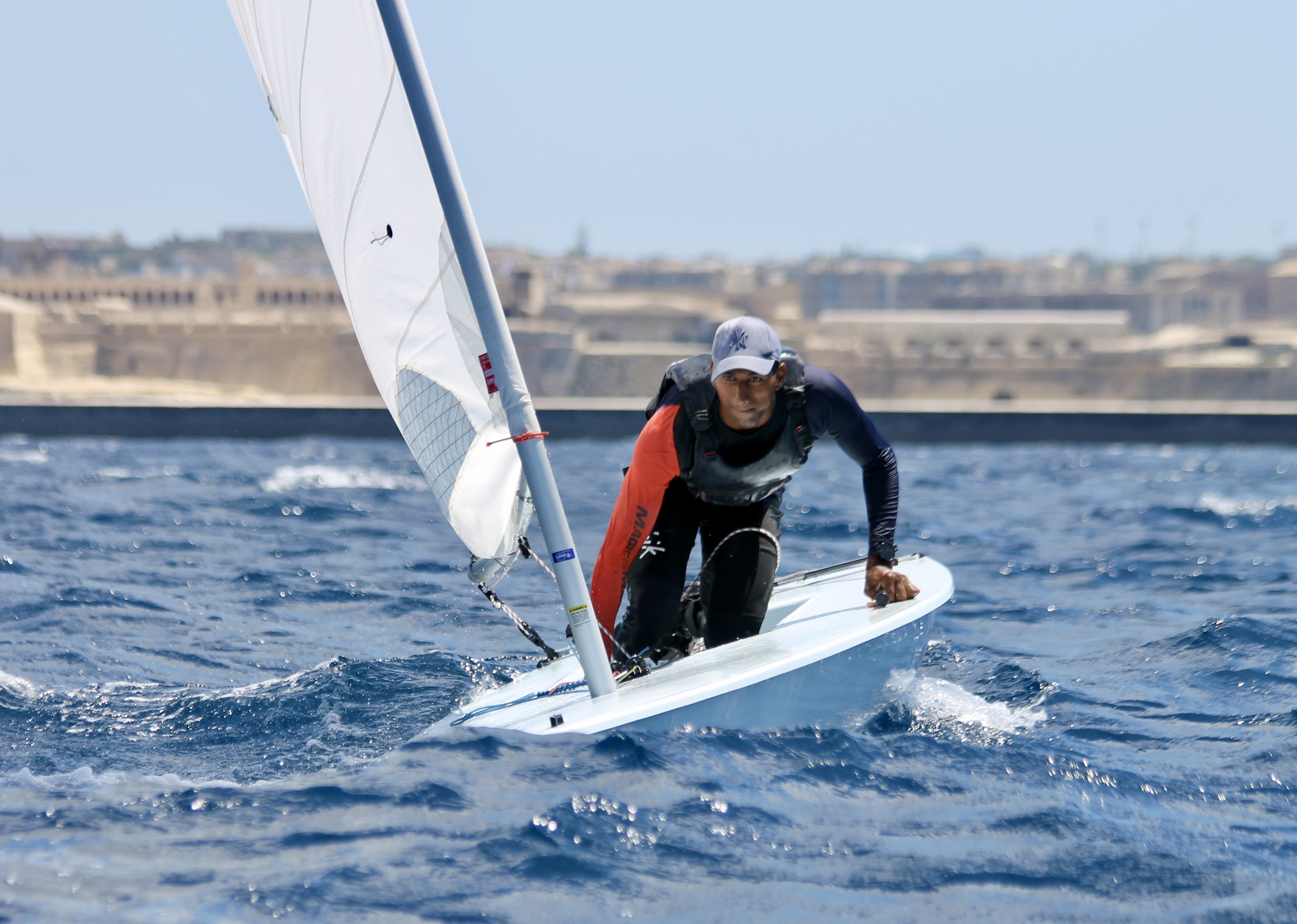
Vishnu Saravanan finished 20th in the men's laser event for the best ever finish by an Indian sailor in the event.

The qualification period for the sailing event commenced at the 2018 Sailing World Championships in Aarhus, Denmark where about forty percent of the total quota was awarded to the top NOCs. Six quota places were allocated at the 2018 Asian Games and 2019 Pan American Games, with 61 quotas across events distributed to the sailors at the World Championships in 2019. The final continental qualification regattas were held in 2021 to decide the remainder of the total quota.

Indian sailors qualified one boat for each of the men's laser, men's 49er and Women's laser radial events at the Asian continental regatta held in April 2021. This was the first time India qualified for multiple sailing events at a single Games. Vishnu Saravanan qualified for the men's laser event for the first time with the duo of K.C. Ganapathy and Varun Thakkar competing in the men's 49er event. In the women's laser radial event, Nethra Kumanan became the first Indian woman to qualify for the sailing event at the Summer Games.

The sailing events were held off the coast of Enoshima from 25 July to 1 August. In the men's laser event, Sarvanan was ranked 14th after the first round but slipped down the rankings in the later rounds. He finished with 156 net points to be ranked 20th and recorded the best ever finish by an Indian sailor in the event. In the 49er event, the Indian duo were classified 17th amongst the 20 boats in the competition. In the women's laser radial event, Kumanan finished the first round in 33rd amongst the 41 competitors but recovered to finish in the top 20 in the next two rounds. But, she slipped down the order in the later and ended with 251 net points to be ranked 35th in the final classification.

Athlete	Event	Race													Total	Net points	Final rank
Athlete	Event	1	2	3	4	5	6	7	8	9	10	11	12	Medal	Total	Net points	Final rank
Vishnu Saravanan	Men's Laser	14	20	24	23	22	12	~~27~~*	23	3	15	—N/a		EL	183	156	20
K.C. Ganapathy; Varun Thakkar	Men's 49er	18	18	17	~~19~~*	14	5	17	11	15	16	9	14	EL	173	154	17
Nethra Kumanan	Women's Laser Radial	33	16	15	~~40~~*	32	38	22	20	37	38	—N/a		EL	291	251	35

Legend: EL = Eliminated – Did not advance to the medal race; * = Worst race result not counted in the overall score

== Shooting ==
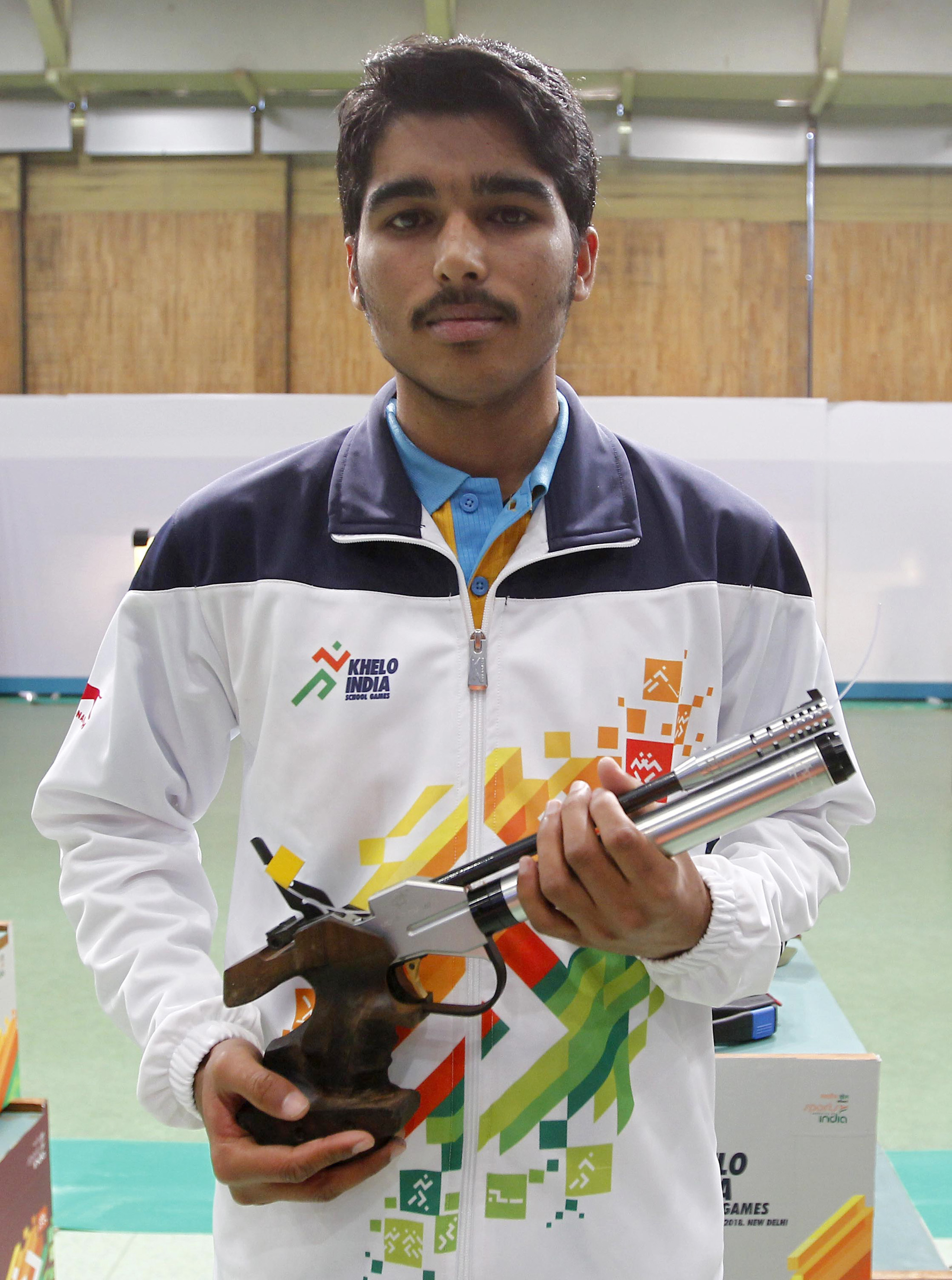
Saurabh Chaudhary, entered the next rounds of both the events he participated in after topping the qualifiers but could not win a medal.

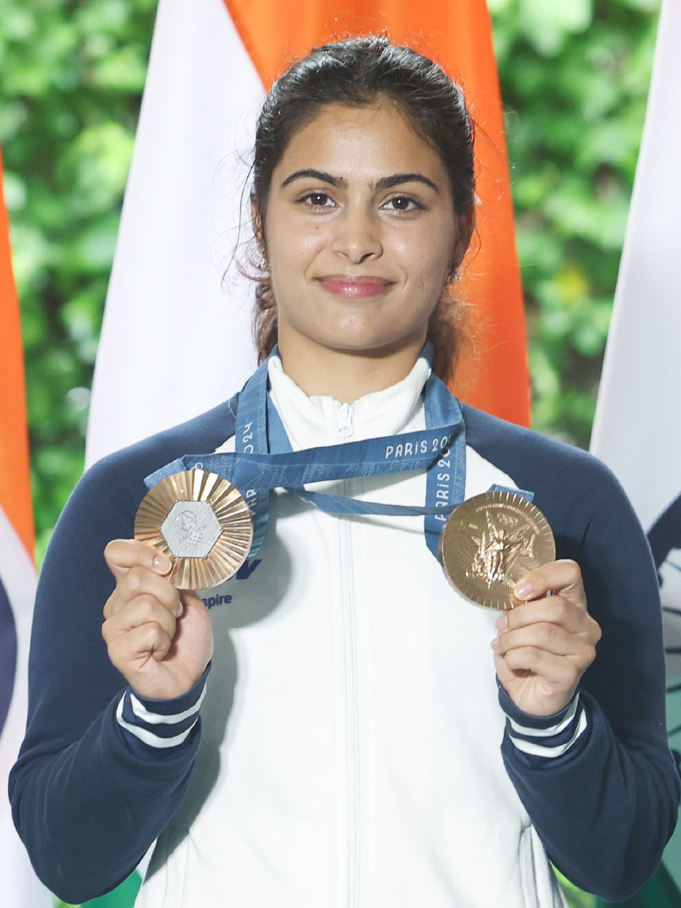
Manu Bhaker teamed up with Saurabh Chaudry to qualify for the mixed 10 m air pistol semi-finals, but finished seventh.

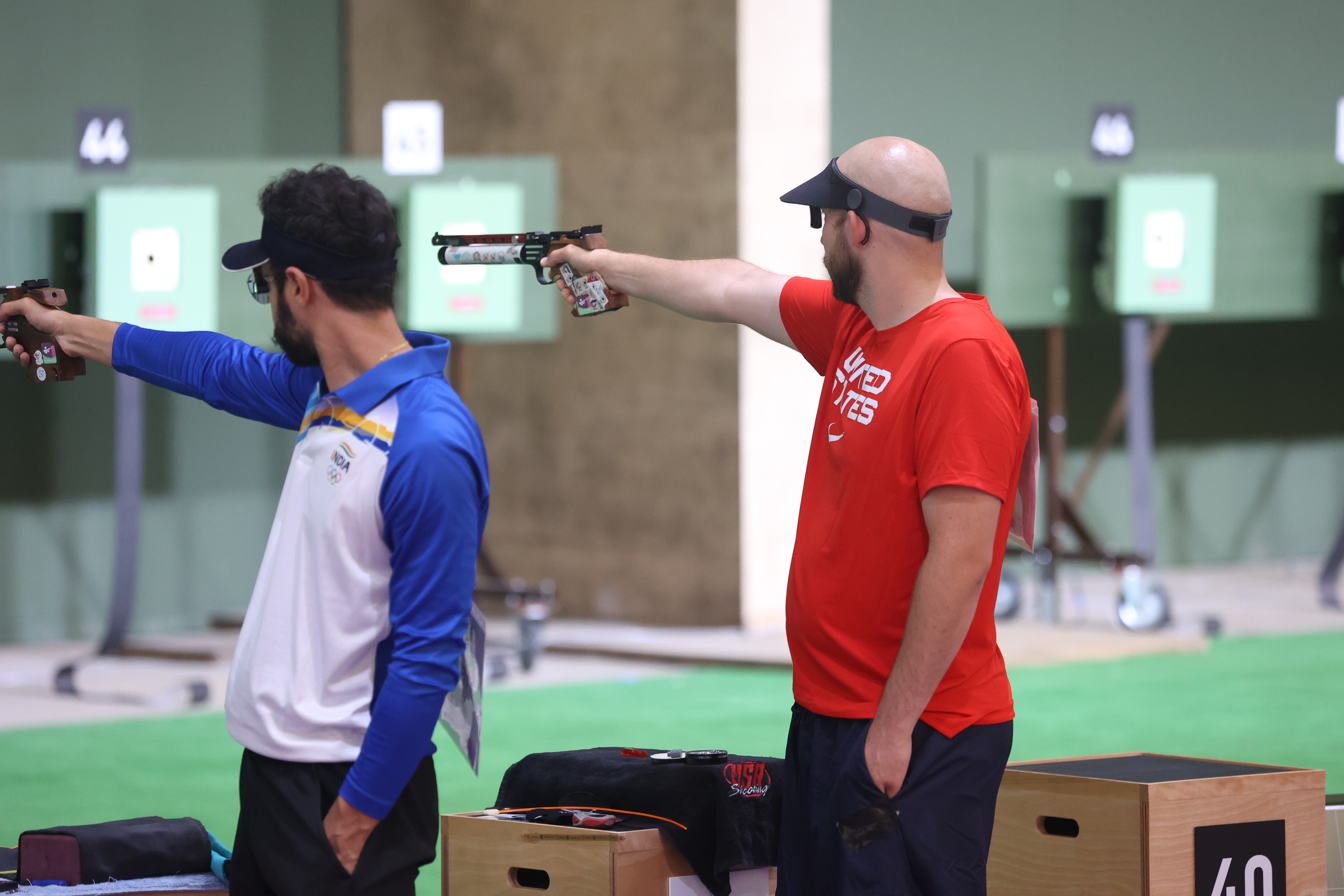
Abhishek Verma (left) shooting at the 10 m air pistol event.

As per the International Shooting Sport Federation (ISSF) guidelines, quota places for the Games were allocated to the NOCs based on the results at designated ISSF supervised events held from 1 September 2018 to 6 June 2021. Four quota places in individual events were awarded to the shooters who competed in the respective mixed team events (rifle, pistol, and trap). Initial quota places were allocated only to the NOCs, who were then allowed to choose the individual shooters. After the initial quotas were allocated, shooters were granted entries based on the ISSF world rankings, which were awarded directly to the individual shooters and were not permitted to be changed by the NOCs.

India secured 15 quota places for the Games. At the 2018 ISSF World Shooting Championships held in September 2018 in Changwon, South Korea, Anjum Modgil and Apurvi Chandela secured India's first two quotas for the women's 10 m air rifle event by finishing second and fourth respectively. In the first ISSF World Cup in 2019 held at New Delhi, Saurabh Chaudhary secured a quota for the men's 10 m air pistol event. Abhishek Verma secured a second quota in the same category after he won the gold medal at the ISSF World Cup held at Beijing. In the same event, Divyansh Singh Panwar secured a quota for the men's 10 m air rifle event. Rahi Sarnobat achieved an Olympic berth in the women's 25 m pistol and Manu Bhaker won a quota in the women's 10 m air pistol in the subsequent World Cup event held at Munich. In the 10 m air pistol event, India achieved a second quota after Yashaswini Deswal won gold in the World Cup event at Rio de Janeiro while Sanjeev Rajput claimed a quota in the men's 50 m rifle three positions at the same event.

India claimed six more Olympic berths at the 2019 Asian Shooting Championships held at Doha. Deepak Kumar won a second quota in the men's 10 m air rifle event after he secured a bronze medal. In the women's 25 m pistol, Chinki Yadav achieved a second quota after she won the event. Tejaswini Sawant and Aishwary Tomar secured spots in the women's and men's 50 m rifle three positions events respectively. Angad Bajwa and Mairaj Ahmad Khan secured spots in the men's skeet competition after finishing in the top two in the skeet event. On 5 April 2021, National Rifle Association of India (NRAI) officially announced a squad of fourteen shooters for the rescheduled Games. As Bhaker achieved an additional quota in the women's 25 m pistol event, NRAI opted to exchange the quota achieved by Yadav for an additional place in the women's 50 m rifle 3 positions event, which was eventually awarded to Moudgil. Elavenil Valarivan took the spot secured by Moudgil in the 10 m air rifle event while rest of the qualifiers were granted entries to the respective events in which they qualified. India also secured entries for two teams each in the 10 m air rifle and 10m air pistol mixed team events.

The shooting events were held from 24 July to 2 August 2021 at the Asaka Shooting Range. Despite having 20 entries across ten events, the Indian shooters fared poorly and won no medals. Except Chaudhary and Bhaker, the other shooters failed to qualify for the final rounds. In the men's 10 m air pistol event, Chaudhary topped the qualifiers with a score of 586 but finished seventh amongst the eight finalists. Similarly in the mixed event, Chaudhary teamed with Bhaker to qualify on top with a score of 582 but finished in seventh place in the final standings.

Men

Athlete	Event	Qualification		Final	
Athlete	Event	Points	Rank	Points	Rank
Deepak Kumar	10 m air rifle	624.7	26	Did not advance	
Divyansh Singh Panwar	10 m air rifle	622.8	32	Did not advance	
Aishwary Tomar	50 m rifle 3 positions	1167	21	Did not advance	
Sanjeev Rajput	50 m rifle 3 positions	1157	32	Did not advance	
Saurabh Chaudhary	10 m air pistol	586	1 Q	137.4	7
Abhishek Verma	10 m air pistol	575	17	Did not advance	
Angad Bajwa	Skeet	120	18	Did not advance	
Mairaj Ahmad Khan	Skeet	117	25	Did not advance	

Women

Athlete	Event	Qualification		Final	
Athlete	Event	Points	Rank	Points	Rank
Apurvi Chandela	10 m air rifle	621.9	36	Did not advance	
Elavenil Valarivan	10 m air rifle	626.5	16	Did not advance	
Anjum Moudgil	50 m rifle 3 positions	1167	15	Did not advance	
Tejaswini Sawant	50 m rifle 3 positions	1154	33	Did not advance	
Manu Bhaker	10 m air pistol	575	12	Did not advance	
Yashaswini Deswal	10 m air pistol	574	13	Did not advance	
Manu Bhaker	25 m pistol	582	15	Did not advance	
Rahi Sarnobat	25 m pistol	573	32	Did not advance	

Mixed

Athlete	Event	Qualification		Semifinal		Final / BM	
Athlete	Event	Points	Rank	Points	Rank	Points	Rank
Deepak Kumar; Anjum Moudgil	10 m air rifle team	623.8	18	Did not advance			
Divyansh Singh Panwar; Elavenil Valarivan	10 m air rifle team	626.5	12	Did not advance			
Saurabh Chaudhary; Manu Bhaker	10 m air pistol team	582	1 Q	380	7	Did not advance	
Abhishek Verma; Yashaswini Deswal	10 m air pistol team	564	17	Did not advance			

Legend: Q = Qualified for the next round

== Swimming ==
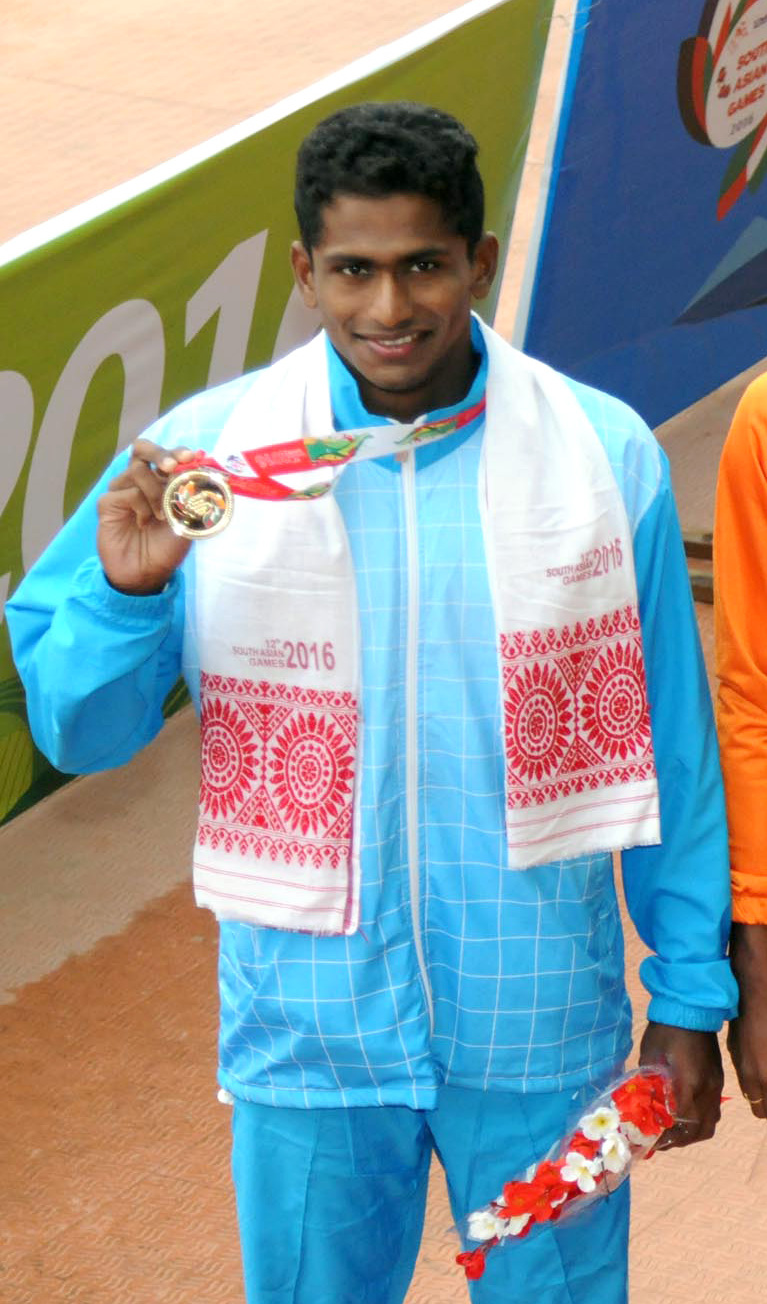
Sajan Prakash was the first Indian swimmer to qualify directly for the Olympic Games and participated in his second consecutive Olympics.

As per the Fédération internationale de natation (FINA) guidelines, a NOC was permitted to enter a maximum of two qualified athletes in each individual event, who have achieved the Olympic Qualifying Time (OQT). If the quota was not filled, one athlete per event was allowed to enter, provided they achieved the Olympic Selection Time (OST). The qualifying time standards should have been achieved in competitions approved by World Aquatics in the period between 1 March 2019 to 27 June 2021. FINA also allowed NOCs to enter swimmers (one per gender) under a universality place even if they have not achieved the standard entry times (OQT/OST).

Sajan Prakash clocked a time of 1:56.38 in the 200 m butterfly event to set a new national record in the 2021 Sette Colli trophy in Rome and achieved the OST for the 200 m butterfly event, set at 1:56.48. Srihari Nataraj set a time of 53.77 in the trials at the same event to better the OST for the men's 100 m backstroke event set at 53.85. Prakash was the first Indian swimmer to qualify directly for the Olympic Games and this was his second Olympic Games after he participated in the 2016 Olympics on a universality quota. Woman swimmer Maana Patel received an entry into the women's 100 m backstroke event via a universality invitation from FINA.

The swimming events were held at the Tokyo Aquatics Centre. In the men's 100m backstroke event, Nataraj finished 27th out of the 41 competitors with a time of 54.31 and failed to qualify for the next round. In the men's 200m butterfly event held on 26 July, Prakash registered a time of 1:57.22 in the second heat to be ranked 24th amongst the 36 swimmers and did not progress to the next round. Similarly in the 100m butterfly event held on 29 July, he failed to make it to the semi-finals after finishing 46th amongst the 60 swimmers. Patel also failed to progress beyond the heats after being placed 39th.

Athlete	Event	Heat		Semifinal		Final	
Athlete	Event	Time	Rank	Time	Rank	Time	Rank
Srihari Nataraj	Men's 100 m backstroke	54.31	27	Did not advance			
Sajan Prakash	Men's 100 m butterfly	53:45	46	Did not advance			
Sajan Prakash	Men's 200 m butterfly	1:57:22	24	Did not advance			
Maana Patel	Women's 100 m backstroke	1:05.20	39	Did not advance			

== Table tennis ==
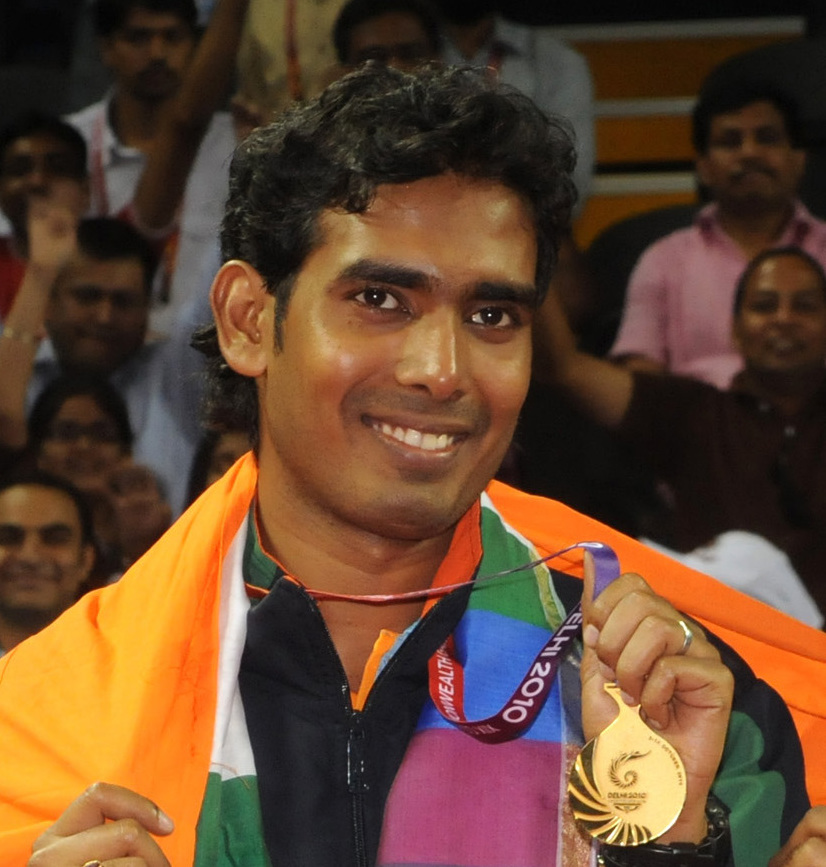
Sharath Kamal participated in his fourth Olympic Games.

According to the International Table Tennis Federation (ITTF), each NOC was allowed to enter up to six athletes, two male and two female athletes in singles events, up to one men's and one women's team in team events, and up to one pair in mixed doubles. Qualification was awarded through a combination of ITTF rankings, continental quotas and world qualification tournaments. In the Asia Qualification Event held at Doha in March 2021, India qualified two individual athletes each in the singles categories and one team in the mixed doubles event.

Sathiyan Gnanasekaran and Sutirtha Mukherjee won the men's and women's singles categories while three-time Olympian Sharath Kamal and 2018 Commonwealth Games champion Manika Batra secured the remaining spots as the highest-ranked eligible table tennis players in the same competition.

The main events were held at the Tokyo Metropolitan Gymnasium between 24 July and 6 August in which 173 athletes representing 57 NOCs competed across five events. In the Men's singles event, Gnanasekaran lost his first match against Lam Siu-hang of Vietnam by a 3–4 scoreline. He led 3–1 before losing three successive sets to be eliminated from the competition. Kamal won his first round match against Tiago Apolónia of Portugal, but lost 1–4 to eventual gold medalist Ma Long of China in the next round.

In the women's singles event, Mukherjee defeated Sweden's Linda Bergström in the first round before losing to Fu Yu of Portugal in straight sets in the next round. Batra won the first round against Tin-Tin Ho of Great Britain and defeated Margaryta Pesotska of Ukraine in the next round. However, she lost to Sofia Polcanova in straight sets in the third round, which ended the Indian competition in the event. In the mixed doubles, the Indian pair of Kamal and Batra lost in straight sets to Lin Yun-ju and Cheng I-ching of Chinese Taipei in the opening round.

Athlete	Event	Preliminary	Round 1	Round 2	Round 3	Round of 16	Quarterfinals	Semifinals	Final / BM	
Athlete	Event	Opposition Result	Opposition Result	Opposition Result	Opposition Result	Opposition Result	Opposition Result	Opposition Result	Opposition Result	Rank
Sharath Kamal	Men's singles	Bye		Apolónia (POR); W 4–2	Ma L (CHN); L 1–4	Did not advance				
Sathiyan Gnanasekaran	Men's singles	Bye		Lam S-h (HKG); L 3–4	Did not advance					
Manika Batra	Women's singles	Bye	Ho (GBR); W 4–0	Pesotska (UKR); W 4–3	Polcanova (AUT); L 0–4	Did not advance				
Sutirtha Mukherjee	Women's singles	Bye	Bergström (SWE); W 4–3	Fu (POR); L 0–4	Did not advance					
Sharath Kamal; Manika Batra	Mixed doubles	—N/a				Lin Y-j / Cheng I-c (TPE); L 0–4	Did not advance			

Legend: W = Win; L = Loss

== Tennis ==
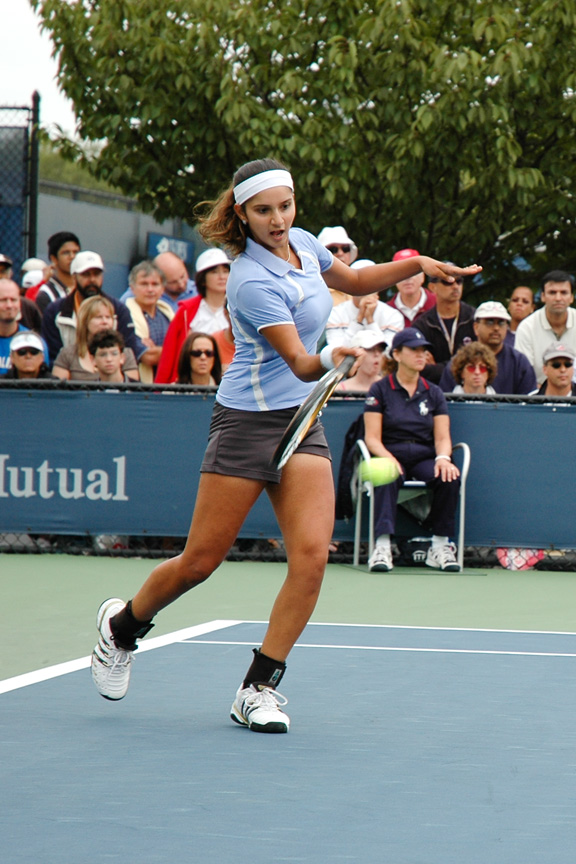
Sania Mirza participated in her fourth Olympic Games, having narrowly missed out on a medal at the 2016 Games.

As per the International Tennis Federation, the main qualifying criterion was based on the players' positions on the ATP Entry Ranking and WTA ranking lists published on 14 June 2021. Additionally, players had to have been part of the nominated team for three Billie Jean King Cup (women) or Davis Cup (men) events between the 2016 and 2020. This requirement was reduced to two events if the player had represented their nation at least twenty times. Each NOC could enter six athletes of each gender with a maximum of four entries in the individual events, and two pairs in the doubles events. The top 56 ranked players in the singles event qualified directly with spots allocated to subsequent ranked players if the NOCs exhaust the quota of four. For the doubles event, top ten ranked players qualified directly and were allowed to choose their partners ranked under 300.

Sumit Nagal, who was ranked 144, did not secure a direct entry but qualified later for the men's singles event after several higher ranked players withdrew. Yuki Bhambri, who was ranked 127 qualified initially, but withdrew because of a knee injury. India entered a pair for the women's doubles event by using Sania Mirza's protected ranking of nine in the WTP rankings. Mirza partnered Ankita Raina in the event. This was the fourth Olympic participation for Mirza, who had reached the semi-finals in the 2016 Games, narrowly missing out on a medal.

The main events were held between 24 July and 1 August at the Ariake Tennis Park. In the first round of the women's doubles event held on 25 July, the Indian pair won the first set 6–0 against the Ukrainian pair of Lyudmyla and Nadiia Kichenok in 21 minutes. The Indian pair led 5–3 in the second set with Mirza serving for the match. But the Ukrainian pair took three of the next four points to force a tie-break, which they won. They went on to win the match after winning the super tie-break to knock the Indian pair out of the competition. In the men's singles event, Nagal won the first set against Uzbek Denis Istomin before losing the second set on a tie-break. He took the third set to win the match and qualified for the next round. In the second round, Nagal lost in straight sets to then world number two Daniil Medvedev, which ended India's participation in the event.

Athlete	Event	Round of 64	Round of 32	Round of 16	Quarterfinals	Semifinals	Final / BM	
Athlete	Event	Opposition Result	Opposition Result	Opposition Result	Opposition Result	Opposition Result	Opposition Result	Rank
Sumit Nagal	Men's singles	Istomin (UZB); W 6–4, 6–7^{(6–8)}, 6–4	Medvedev (ROC); L 2–6, 1–6	Did not advance				
Sania Mirza; Ankita Raina	Women's doubles	—N/a	L Kichenok / N Kichenok (UKR); L 6–0, 6–7^{(0–7)}, [8–10]	Did not advance				

Legend: W = Win; L = Loss

== Weightlifting ==
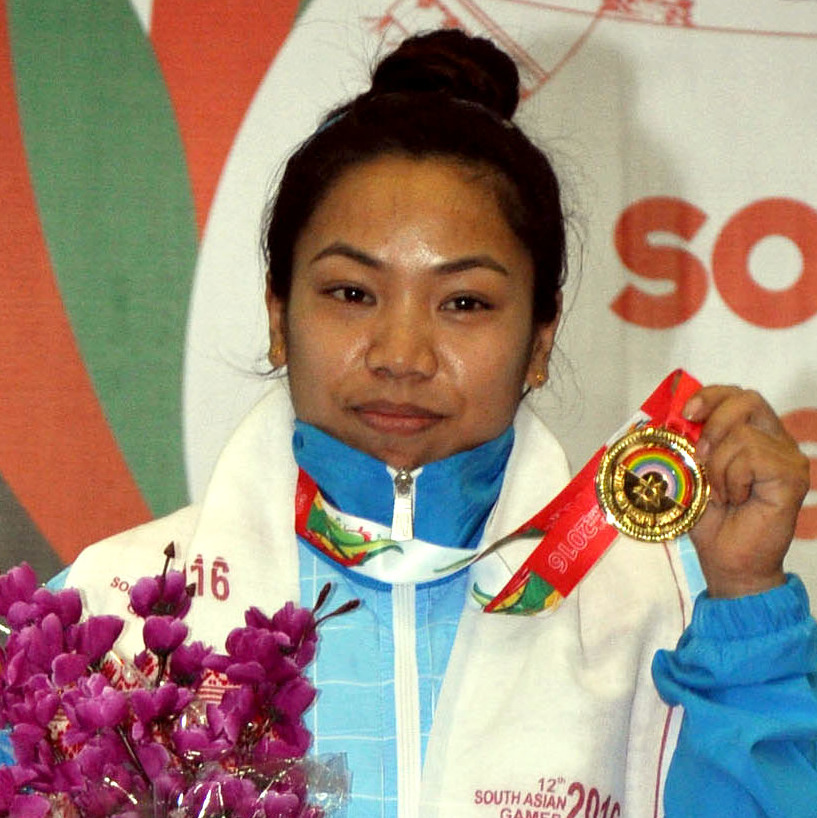
Saikhom Mirabai Chanu won a silver medal in the women's −49 kg event.

As per the guidelines set by the International Weightlifting Federation (IWF), each NOC was allowed to enter a maximum of eight competitors with four per gender. The top eight athletes by ranking points in each weight category qualified directly subject to the above condition. The IWF released its qualification list on 28 June 2021. India was restricted to only half the quota places due to previous doping violations. Saikhom Mirabai Chanu qualified for the women's −49 kg category after she was ranked second in the category on the IWF Absolute World Rankings.

The main event that took place on 24 July at the Tokyo International Forum. In the snatch, Chanu lifted 84 kg lift in her first attempt and cleared 87 kg in the later attempt. In the clean and jerk, she lifted 110 kg in the first attempt before improving to 115 kg. Her combined effort of 202 kg was good enough for a silver medal. She became the first Indian medalist at the Games, won India's first ever silver medal in weight lifting, and the first weightlifting medal since 2000.

Athlete	Event	Snatch		Clean & Jerk		Total	Rank
Athlete	Event	Result	Rank	Result	Rank	Total	Rank
Saikhom Mirabai Chanu	Women's −49 kg	87	2	115	2	202	2nd place, silver medalist(s)

== Wrestling ==
As per the United World Wrestling, each NOC was allowed to enter a maximum of 18 wrestlers with one per event. Quotas were allocated at the 2019 World Wrestling Championships, continental tournaments (2021 Asian Wrestling Olympic Qualification Tournament for Asia) and 2021 World Wrestling Olympic Qualification Tournament. In the World Championships held at Nur-Sultan in September 2019, India achieved three men's quota places through Ravi Kumar Dahiya (57 kg), Bajrang Punia (65 kg), Deepak Punia (86 kg and one in the women's category through Vinesh Phogat (53 kg). In the Asian qualification tournament held at Astana in April 2021, India women wrestlers achieved two more quota places through Anshu Malik (57 kg), and Sonam Malik (62 kg). Seema Bisla (women's 50 kg) and Sumit Malik (men's 125 kg) achieved final quota places at the World Olympic qualifiers at Sofia in May 2021. Sumit Malik was disqualified following a positive doping test and the quota place he had claimed was taken off. This left India with a total of seven wrestlers in the competition.

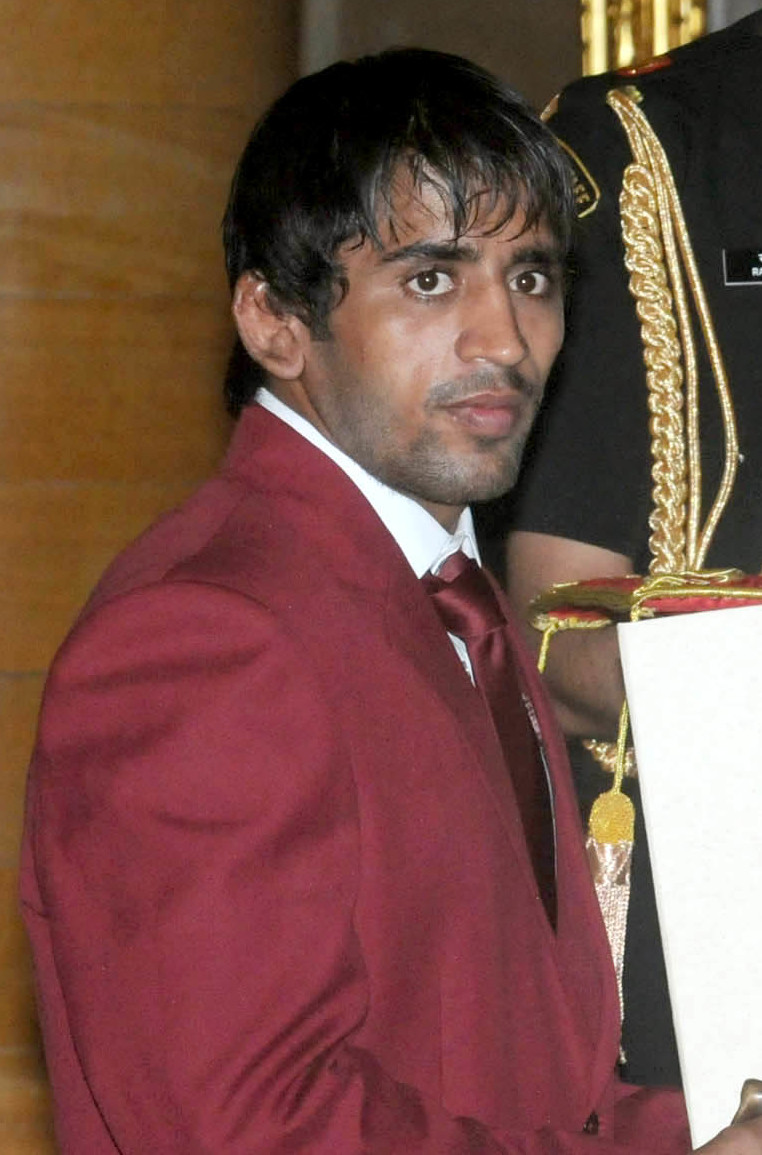
Bajrang Punia won a bronze medal in the men's 65 kg category.

The wrestling events took place between 1 and 7 August at the Makuhari Messe in Mihama-ku. In the women's 62 kg event held on 3 August, Sonam Malik was eliminated after losing her initial round of 16 bout to Khürelkhüügiin Bolortuyaa of Mongolia. Though both scored two points each, the Mongolian progressed as she had obtained the highest point score for a single move after her two points for a take down. In the women's 57 kg event held on the following day, Anshu Malik lost to Iryna Kurachkina of Belarus in the first round. As losers to eventual finalists were allowed to compete in a repachage round for bronze, she faced Valeria Koblova in the initial repechage bout but lost to her by a scoreline of 1–3. In the men's 57 kg event held on the same day, Dahiya won against Óscar Tigreros of Colombia in the first round and Georgi Vangelov of Bulgaria in the quarterfinals by technical superiority and qualified for the semifinals. In the semi-finals next day, he faced Nurislam Sanayev of Kazakhstan. He trailed 2–9 to the Kazakh before he pinned his opponent and won the match to qualify for the final. He lost to Zaur Uguev in the final by a score of 4–7 and settled for a silver medal. He became the second Indian wrestler to win a silver medal at the Olympic Games after Sushil Kumar in the 2012 Games.

Deepak Punia won the opening bout easily against Ekerekeme Agiomor of Nigeria in the men's 86 kg category. In the quarterfinals, he defeated Lin Zushen of China by a margin of 6–3. In the semifinals held on 4 August, David Taylor of the United States defeated him on technical superiority. In the bronze medal contest, he lost to Myles Amine by a difference of two points to miss out on a medal. In the women's 53 kg category, world number one Phogat started win a 7–1 win over Sofia Mattsson of Sweden in the first match before she lost to Vanesa Kaladzinskaya of Belarus in the quarterfinals to be eliminated from the competition. In the women's 50 kg category, Bisla lost her opening bout to Sarra Hamdi of Tunisia on her Olympic debut and was eliminated from the competition. In the men's 65 kg category, Bajrang Punia secured a first round victory over Ernazar Akmataliev of Kyrgyzstan by countback after the scores were tied. He pinned Morteza Ghiasi of Iran to win the quarterfinal bout. In the semifinals, he was defeated by Haji Aliyev of Azerbaijan. He defeated Daulet Niyazbekov in the bronze medal bout by a score of 8–0 to win India's second wrestling medal in the Games.

Freestyle

Athlete	Event	Round of 16	Quarterfinal	Semifinal	Repechage	Final / BM	
Athlete	Event	Opposition Result	Opposition Result	Opposition Result	Opposition Result	Opposition Result	Rank
Ravi Kumar Dahiya	Men's −57 kg	Tigreros (COL); W 13–2 ^{VSU1}	Vangelov (BUL); W 14–4 ^{VSU1}	Sanayev (KAZ); W 7–9 ^{VFA}	—N/a	Uguev (ROC); L 4–7 ^{VPO1}	2nd place, silver medalist(s)
Bajrang Punia	Men's −65 kg	Akmataliev (KGZ); W 3–3 ^{VPO1}	Ghiasi (IRI); W 5–0 ^{VT}	Aliyev (AZE); L 5–12 ^{VPO1}	Bye	Niyazbekov (KAZ); W 8–0 ^{VPO}	3rd place, bronze medalist(s)
Deepak Punia	Men's −86 kg	Agiomor (NGR); W 12–1 ^{VSU1}	Lin Zs (CHN); W 6–3 ^{VPO1}	Taylor (USA); L 0–10 ^{VSU}	Bye	Amine (SMR); L 2–4 ^{VPO1}	5
Seema Bisla	Women's −50 kg	Hamdi (TUN); L 1–3 ^{PP}	Did not advance				13
Vinesh Phogat	Women's −53 kg	Mattsson (SWE); W 7–1 ^{VPO1}	Kaladzinskaya (BLR); L 3–9 ^{VPO1}	Did not advance			9
Anshu Malik	Women's −57 kg	Kurachkina (BLR); L 2–8 ^{VPO1}	Did not advance		Koblova (ROC); L 1–5 ^{VPO1}	Did not advance	9
Sonam Malik	Women's −62 kg	Khürelkhüü (MGL); L 2–2 ^{VPO1}	Did not advance				11

Key:

- W – Win; L – Loss;
- VFA – Victory by fall
- VPO – Victory by nine or less points where the losing wrestler scores zero points.
- VPO1 – Victory by nine or less points where the losing wrestler scores at least one point.
- VSU – Victory by ten or more points where the losing wrestler scores zero points.
- VSU1 – Victory by ten or more points where the losing wrestler scores at least one point.

== See also ==
- India at the 2020 Summer Paralympics
- India at the Olympics
