= Revathi Veeramani =

Indian athlete

Personal information
- Full name: Revathi Veeramani
- Nationality: Indian
- Born: 23 December 1997 (age 28) Sakkimangalam, Madurai, Tamil Nadu, India

Sport
- Country: India
- Sport: Athletics

Revathi Veeramani is an Indian athlete from Tamil Nadu. She has been selected for representing India at the 2020 Summer Olympics at the event of Mixed 4 × 400m Relay.

== See also ==
- India at the 2020 Summer Olympics
