= Cyprus at the World Athletics Championships =

- Flag of Cyprus
- WA code: CYP
- Medals: Gold 0 Silver 1 Bronze 1 Total 2

World Athletics Championships appearances (overview)
- 1983; 1987; 1991; 1993; 1995; 1997; 1999; 2001; 2003; 2005; 2007; 2009; 2011; 2013; 2015; 2017; 2019; 2022; 2023; 2025

Cyprus has competed at the World Athletics Championships since 1983, being absent in 2001 and 2011. Kyriakos Ioannou was the first athlete to win a medal for the country, when he placed third in the men's high jump event at the 2007 World Athletics Championships. Kyriakos then went on to win a second medal, this time with a second place in the same event.

== Medalists ==
Medal	Name	Year	Event
Bronze	Kyriakos Ioannou	2007 Osaka	Men's high jump
Silver	Kyriakos Ioannou	2009 Berlin	Men's high jump

=== By event ===
Event	Gold	Silver	Bronze	Total
High jump	0	1	1	2
Totals (1 entries)	0	1	1	2

=== By gender ===
Gender	Gold	Silver	Bronze	Total
Men	0	1	1	2
Women	0	0	0	0

== See also ==
- Cyprus at the Olympics
- Cyprus at the Paralympics
