= Cyprus at the 2025 World Athletics Championships =

- Flag of Cyprus
- WA code: CYP

in Tokyo, Japan 13 September 2025 – 21 September 2025
- Competitors: 5 (0 men and 5 women)
- Medals: Gold 0 Silver 0 Bronze 0 Total 0

World Athletics Championships appearances (overview)
- 1983; 1987; 1991; 1993; 1995; 1997; 1999; 2001; 2003; 2005; 2007; 2009; 2011; 2013; 2015; 2017; 2019; 2022; 2023; 2025

Cyprus competed at the 2025 World Athletics Championships in Tokyo, Japan, from 13 to 21 September 2025.

== Results ==
Cyprus entered 5 athletes to the championships, all women.

Key

- Q = Qualified for the next round
- q = Qualified for the next round as a fastest loser or, in field events, by position without achieving the qualifying target
- NR = National record
- PB = Personal best
- SB = Season best
- N/A = Round not applicable for the event

=== Women ===
Track and road events

Athlete	Event	Heat		Semifinal		Final	
Athlete	Event	Result	Rank	Result	Rank	Result	Rank
Olivia Fotopoulou	200 metres	20.98	5 q	23.02	8	Did not advance	

Field events

Athlete	Event	Qualification		Final	
Athlete	Event	Distance	Position	Distance	Position
Styliana Ioannidou	High jump	NM		Did not advance	
Elena Kulichenko	High jump	1.88	12 q	1.93	9
Filippa Fotopulou	Long jump	6.25	30	Did not advance	
Valentina Savva	Hammer throw	66.20	32	Did not advance	
