= Jared Schuurmans =

American discus thrower

Personal information
- Born: 20 August 1987 (age 38) Norfolk, Nebraska, United States

Sport
- Sport: Track and field
- Event: Discus throw
Medal record
Representing United States
Pan American Sports Festival
Silver medal – second place	2014 Mexico City	Discus throw

Jared Schuurmans (born August 20, 1987) is an American track and field athlete who competes in the discus throw. He holds a personal record of 66.10 m (216 ft 10 1/4 in) for the event, set in 2015. He was the American national discus champion in 2015.

Schuurmans won an NAIA discus title in 2010 while at Doane College. He was the silver medallist at the 2014 Pan American Sports Festival.

== Career ==
=== Early life and college ===
Raised in Norfolk, Nebraska, the son of Gary and Connie Schuurmans, he was trained by his father, who was also an athlete. He attended Norfolk Senior High School. After having had an initial focus on the decathlon in his youth, he won state titles and set high school records in the discus throw. He studied history at Doane College and represented the school athletically.

In 2008 he ranked second in the discus at the National Association of Intercollegiate Athletics Championships and was in the top ten of the NAIA shot put both indoors and out. A new school record came at the start of the season and he raised his national profile with a second-place finish at the 2009 Drake Relays. He then improved to third in the shot put at the NAIA Outdoor Championships, but fell to fourth in the discus. He set a new best of 59.20 m (194 ft 2 1/2 in) in Crete, Nebraska that June and made his debut at the USA Outdoor Track and Field Championships two weeks later, finishing 19th overall. In his final year as a college athlete he achieved his best results. A new personal record of 17.66 m (57 ft 11 1/4 in) in the shot put brought him second at the 2010 NAIA Indoor Championships. An outdoor best of 17.28 m (56 ft 8 1/4 in) for second place followed at the NAIA Outdoor Championships, where he took his first collegiate title in the discus. He also moved up the national rankings with 16th at the 2010 USA Outdoor Track and Field Championships.

=== Early professional career ===
After graduation, Schuurmans continued with the discus throw on a professional basis. He achieved a personal record mark of 60.19 m (197 ft 5 1/2 in) in Chula Vista, California in April 2011. He failed to get near that mark at the 2012 United States Olympic Trials, coming 16th with a throw of 56.94 m (186 ft 9 1/2 in). The experience was an encouraging one for him, as he believed he could get close to the top of the sport with better preparation. He joined the National Athletic Institute's United States Olympic Training Center in Chula Vista in 2013 and began training with former Olympic discus champion Mac Wilkins – who had been a childhood idol of Schuurmans'. He was much improved that year, throwing beyond 200 feet on 24 occasions and ending the year with a new personal record of 62.89 m (206 ft 3 3/4 in). This mark raised him to seventh place in the American seasonal rankings by Track and Field News. He was 51st on the world lists for 2013. Schuurmans' comparatively slim build for an American discus thrower led journalist Martin Bingisser to identify a trend towards smaller, more technique-led throwers in the country, with that year's American champion Lance Brooks being another example. Schuurmans also stated that throw practice was by far the most important part of his training for the sport, rather than weight training.

Schuurmans began to compete with greater consistency in 2014 and threw beyond sixty meters in nearly all his competitions that year. A new personal record of 64.42 m (211 ft 4 in) came in Chula Vista in April, but he also had several other throws beyond 63 meters that year. He was a national finalist for the first time at the 2014 USA Outdoor Track and Field Championships, ending in seventh place with a best of 60.28 m (197 ft 9 in). With no World Championships or Olympics being held that year, he instead made his debut on the international track and field circuit, coming fourth at the Grande Premio Brasil Caixa de Atletismo in Brazil ahead of United States Olympian Jason Young. He earned his first national selection that year, being part of the team for the Pan American Sports Festival in Mexico. His throw of 59.90 m (196 ft 6 1/4 in) at the meeting brought him a silver medal behind only Cuba's Jorge Fernández, the reigning Pan American champion. Schuurmans ranked 33rd internationally for the season and fifth among American men.

=== First national title ===
He made his IAAF Diamond League debut in 2015 at the Prefontaine Classic, coming seventh among an international field. Schuurmans had a throw of 66.10 m (216 ft 10 1/4 in) in June which, although set in a windy venue, placed him as the favourite for the national championships, having also gone undefeated by an American at that point of the season. He followed expectation at the 2015 USA Outdoor Track and Field Championships, winning his first national title with a throw of 64.64 m (212 ft 3/4 in). This also guaranteed his selection for the World Championships that year. Schuurmans threw 57.74 m (189 ft 5 in) to place 29th in 2015 World Championships in Athletics – Men's discus throw.

== Personal records ==
- Discus throw – 66.10 m (216 ft 10 1/4 in) (2015)
- Shot put indoor – 17.66 m (57 ft 11 1/4 in) (2010)
- Shot put outdoor – 17.28 m (56 ft 8 1/4 in) (2010)

== Discus progression ==
- 2015: 66.10 m (216 ft 10 1/4 in)
- 2014: 64.42 m (211 ft 4 in)
- 2013: 62.89 m (206 ft 3 3/4 in)
- 2011: 60.19 m (197 ft 5 1/2 in)
- 2010: 56.07 m (183 ft 11 1/4 in)
- 2009: 59.20 m (194 ft 2 1/2 in)
- 2008: 54.11 m (177 ft 6 1/4 in)
- 2007: 50.24 m (164 ft 9 3/4 in)

== National titles ==
- USA Outdoor Track and Field Championships
  - Discus throw: 2015

== International competitions ==
Year	Competition	Venue	Position	Event	Notes
2014	Pan American Sports Festival	Mexico City, Mexico	2nd	Discus throw	59.90 m
2015	Pan American Games	Toronto, Canada	4th	Discus throw	62.32 m
2015	World Championships	Beijing, China	29th (q)	Discus throw	57.74 m

== Personal life ==
Jared lives in Milwaukie, OR where he is a pro team sales manager for Sorinex. He has two dogs. A Boston terrier named Mochi and a French Bulldog named Indiana Jones.

Jared has served on the committee for the Tortuga Pirate festival. He is the acting treasurer for the Pacific Northwest chapter of the festival.

Jared is Married to Erin Schuurmans (formerly Erin Nicole Oliveros)

https://www.theknot.com/us/erin-oliveros-and-jared-schuurmans-2025-09-13-33bb0d6a-b47c-47e9-bc2c-cf164e0ab0b4/travel
