= Athletics at the 2011 Pan American Games – Men's discus throw =

Men's discus throw at the 2011 Pan American Games
- Venue: Telmex Athletics Stadium
- Dates: October 24
- Competitors: 14 from 11 nations

Medalists
Gold medal	Jorge Fernandez	Cuba
Silver medal	Jarred Rome	United States
Bronze medal	Ronald Juliao	Brazil

The men's discus throw competition of the athletics events at the 2011 Pan American Games took place on the 24 of October at the Telmex Athletics Stadium. The defending Pan American Games champion is Michael Robertson of the United States.

== Records ==
Prior to this competition, the existing world and Pan American Games records were as follows:

World record	Jürgen Schult (GDR)	74.08	Neubrandenburg, East Germany	June 6, 1986
Pan American Games record	Luis Delis (CUB)	67.32	Caracas, Venezuela	August 25, 1983

== Qualification ==
Each National Olympic Committee (NOC) was able to enter up to two entrants providing they had met the minimum standard (53.00 meters) in the qualifying period (January 1, 2010 to September 14, 2011).

== Results ==
14 athletes from 11 countries competed, with the final round taking place at 17:35 on October 24, 2011. Results were as follows:

Rank	Athlete	Nationality	#1	#2	#3	#4	#5	#6	Result	Notes
1st place, gold medalist(s)	Jorge Fernández	Cuba	62.14	60.80	65.58	64.46	x	x	65.58	
2nd place, silver medalist(s)	Jarred Rome	United States	x	60.98	61.71	x	x	x	61.71	
3rd place, bronze medalist(s)	Ronald Julião	Brazil	55.50	58.32	61.56	61.70	60.84	59.24	61.70	
4	Yunio Lastre	Cuba	59.72	59.87	x	61.07	60.37	58.59	61.07	
5	Jason Young	United States	58.32	59.43	60.08	60.54	59.78	60.91	60.91	
6	Mario Cota	Mexico	58.38	59.30	x	x	58.58	x	59.30	
7	Jason Morgan	Jamaica	55.20	58.91	55.74	58.01	x	x	58.91	
8	Jesus Parejo	Venezuela	53.92	55.35	54.13	x	54.27	54.70	55.35	
9	Michael Putman	Peru	52.62	49.60	51.35				52.62	
10	Jorge Balliengo	Argentina	51.41	x	51.93				51.93	
11	Rodolfo Casanova	Uruguay	x	48.62	x				48.62	
12	Alfredo Romero	Puerto Rico	43.63	47.97	46.96				47.94	
	O'Dayne Richards	Jamaica							DNS*	
	Quincy Wilson	Trinidad and Tobago							DNS*	

- DNS = Did not start
