= Athletics at the 2015 Pan American Games – Men's discus throw =

Men's discus throw at the 2015 Pan American Games
- Venue: CIBC Pan Am and Parapan Am Athletics Stadium
- Dates: July 23
- Competitors: 12 from 10 nations
- Winning distance: 64.80

Medalists
Gold medal	Fedrick Dacres	Jamaica
Silver medal	Ronald Julião	Brazil
Bronze medal	Russell Winger	United States

The men's discus throw competition of the athletics events at the 2015 Pan American Games took place on July 23 at the CIBC Pan Am and Parapan Am Athletics Stadium. The defending Pan American Games champion was Jorge Fernandez of Cuba.

== Records ==
Prior to this competition, the existing world and Pan American Games records were as follows:

World record	Jürgen Schult (GDR)	74.08	Neubrandenburg, East Germany	June 6, 1986
Pan American Games record	Luis Delis (CUB)	67.32	Caracas, Venezuela	August 25, 1983

== Qualification ==
Each National Olympic Committee (NOC) was able to enter up to two entrants providing they had met the minimum standard (53.05) in the qualifying period (January 1, 2014 to June 28, 2015).

== Schedule ==
Date	Time	Round
July 23, 2015	19:05	Final

== Results ==
All results shown are in meters.

KEY:	q	Best non-qualifiers	Q	Qualified	NR	National record	PB	Personal best	SB	Seasonal best	DQ	Disqualified

=== Final ===
Rank	Athlete	Nationality	#1	#2	#3	#4	#5	#6	Result	Notes
1st place, gold medalist(s)	Fedrick Dacres	Jamaica	63.01	62.39	64.80	63.05	64.40	x	64.80	
2nd place, silver medalist(s)	Ronald Julião	Brazil	60.89	63.15	x	x	x	64.65	64.65	SB
3rd place, bronze medalist(s)	Russell Winger	United States	59.40	62.64	60.74	x	60.62	62.33	62.64	
4	Jared Schuurmans	United States	59.79	57.26	x	62.32	59.67	x	62.32	
5	Jorge Fernández	Cuba	x	x	59.91	62.04	x	60.99	62.04	
6	Timothy Nedow	Canada	57.28	x	59.43	61.10	61.49	59.57	61.49	PB
7	Mauricio Ortega	Colombia	61.33	56.08	x	x	x	59.06	61.33	
8	Mario Cota	Mexico	56.06	55.78	57.18	57.29	x	59.89	59.89	SB
9	Marc-Antoine Lafrenaye-Dugas	Canada	x	55.71	55.79				55.79	
10	Quincy Wilson	Trinidad and Tobago	x	43.65	x				43.65	
	Eldred Henry	British Virgin Islands	x	x	x				NM	
	Dillon Simon	Dominica	x	x	x				NM	
