= Markus Münch =

Markus Münch may refer to:

- Markus Münch (footballer) (born 1972), German footballer
- Markus Münch (discus thrower) (born 1986), German discus thrower
