= 2007 European Athletics U23 Championships – Men's discus throw =

The men's discus throw event at the 2007 European Athletics U23 Championships was held in Debrecen, Hungary, at the Gyulai István Atlétikai Stadion on 13 and 14 July.

== Medalists ==
Gold	Martin Wierig; Germany
Silver	Jan Marcell; Czech Republic
Bronze	Apostolos Parellis; Cyprus

== Results ==
=== Final ===
14 July

Rank	Name	Nationality	Attempts						Result	Notes
Rank	Name	Nationality	1	2	3	4	5	6	Result	Notes
1st place, gold medalist(s)	Martin Wierig	Germany	56.36	56.88	56.69	57.73	61.10	60.39	61.10	
2nd place, silver medalist(s)	Jan Marcell	Czech Republic	58.48	x	x	57.11	x	53.50	58.48	
3rd place, bronze medalist(s)	Apostolos Parellis	Cyprus	56.11	56.00	53.69	56.53	57.29	58.16	58.16	
4	Bartosz Ratajczak	Poland	56.36	56.75	x	56.90	56.62	56.71	56.90	
5	Mihai Grasu	Romania	56.71	x	55.87	x	55.54	x	56.71	
6	Margus Hunt	Estonia	55.71	56.49	x	x	55.12	x	56.49	
7	Giovanni Faloci	Italy	52.38	55.84	55.72	x	54.89	55.35	55.84	
8	Nazzareno Di Marco	Italy	53.05	x	54.45	x	52.37	x	54.45	
9	Lajos Kürthy	Hungary	x	53.92	x				53.92	
10	Daniel Schärer	Switzerland	x	x	53.00				53.00	
11	Dmytro Isnyuk	Ukraine	51.97	52.78	x				52.78	
12	Kamil Grzegorczyk	Poland	52.45	x	50.53				52.45	

=== Qualifications ===
13 July
Qualifying 56.00 or 12 best to the Final

==== Group A ====
Rank	Name	Nationality	Result	Notes
1	Martin Wierig	Germany	56.93	Q
2	Mihai Grasu	Romania	56.49	Q
3	Margus Hunt	Estonia	55.47	q
4	Apostolos Parellis	Cyprus	54.52	q
5	Lajos Kürthy	Hungary	54.13	q
6	Nazzareno Di Marco	Italy	53.64	q
7	Bartosz Ratajczak	Poland	53.58	q
8	Steffen Nerdal	Norway	53.23	
8	Pavlo Karsak	Ukraine	49.08	
9	Diego Centi	Italy	NM	

==== Group B ====
Rank	Name	Nationality	Result	Notes
1	Jan Marcell	Czech Republic	59.24	Q
2	Dmytro Isnyuk	Ukraine	56.51	Q
3	Giovanni Faloci	Italy	55.36	q
4	Kamil Grzegorczyk	Poland	53.85	q
5	Daniel Schärer	Switzerland	53.58	q
6	Markus Münch	Germany	53.52	
7	Axel Härstedt	Sweden	53.44	
8	Oleh Frankov	Ukraine	52.73	
9	Sergey Gribkov	Russia	52.23	
10	Orestis Antoniades	Cyprus	52.02	
11	Kemal Mešić	Bosnia and Herzegovina	51.78	

== Participation ==
According to an unofficial count, 21 athletes from 14 countries participated in the event.

- Bosnia and Herzegovina (1)
- Cyprus (2)
- Czech Republic (1)
- Estonia (1)
- Germany (2)
- Hungary (1)
- Italy (3)
- Norway (1)
- Poland (2)
- Romania (1)
- Russia (1)
- Sweden (1)
- Switzerland (1)
- Ukraine (3)
