= 2013 World Championships in Athletics – Men's discus throw =

Men's discus throw at the 2013 World Championships
- Venue: Luzhniki Stadium
- Dates: 12 August (qualification); 13 August (final)
- Competitors: 30 from 25 nations
- Winning distance: 69.11 m (226 ft 8 3/4 in)

Medalists
gold medal	Robert Harting; Germany
silver medal	Piotr Małachowski; Poland
bronze medal	Gerd Kanter; Estonia

Official Video

The men's discus throw at the 2013 World Championships in Athletics was held at the Luzhniki Stadium on 12–13 August.

The three automatic qualifiers turned out to be the three players in this event. On the second throw of the competition Piotr Małachowski took the lead which lasted for about a minute before Gerd Kanter made his first attempt. It was Robert Harting's second attempt that took the lead he would not relinquish. In the fourth round he unleashed his winner at 69.11. Between World Championships and Olympics, he continued his streak of four straight golds. Małachowski's fifth round 68.36 continued his streak of three silvers behind Harting in the same championships. Kanter, Harting's predecessor in both titles, held on for bronze.

== Records ==
Prior to the competition, the records were as follows:

World record	Jürgen Schult (GDR)	74.08	Neubrandenburg, East Germany	6 June 1986
Championship record	Virgilijus Alekna (LTU)	70.17	Helsinki, Finland	7 August 2005
World leading	Piotr Małachowski (POL)	71.84	Hengelo, Netherlands	8 June 2013
African record	Frantz Kruger (RSA)	70.32	Salon-de-Provence, France	26 May 2002
Asian record	Ehsan Hadadi (IRI)	69.32	Tallinn, Estonia	3 June 2008
North, Central American and Caribbean record	Ben Plucknett (USA)	72.34	Stockholm, Sweden	7 July 1981
South American record	Jorge Balliengo (ARG)	66.32	Rosario, Argentina	15 April 2006
European record	Jürgen Schult (GDR)	74.08	Neubrandenburg, East Germany	6 June 1986
Oceanian record	Benn Harradine (AUS)	68.20	Townsville, Australia	10 May 2013

== Qualification standards ==
A result	B result
66.00	64.00

== Schedule ==
Date	Time	Round
12 August 2013	09:40	Qualification
13 August 2013	19:00	Final

All times are local times (UTC+4)

== Results ==
KEY:	Q	Qualified	q	12 best performers	NR	National record	PB	Personal best	SB	Seasonal best

=== Qualification ===
Qualification: 65.00 m (Q) and at least 12 best (q) advanced to the final.

Rank	Group	Name	Nationality	No. 1	No. 2	No. 3	Mark	Notes
1	A	Robert Harting	Germany	66.62			66.62	Q
2	B	Piotr Małachowski	Poland	66.00			66.00	Q
3	A	Gerd Kanter	Estonia	65.54			65.54	Q
4	B	Jorge Fernández	Cuba	64.86			64.86	q
5	A	Robert Urbanek	Poland	62.89	x	64.21	64.21	q
6	B	Martin Wierig	Germany	63.47	64.06		64.06	q
7	A	Vikas Gowda	India	63.64	62.59	62.67	63.64	q
8	B	Frank Casañas	Spain	x	x	63.17	63.17	q
9	B	Victor Butenko	Russia	x	63.07	x	63.07	q
10	A	Mario Pestano	Spain	62.80	61.79	62.15	62.80	q
11	B	Julian Wruck	Australia	60.36	60.84	62.48	62.48	q
12	A	Victor Hogan	South Africa	x	62.45	61.59	62.45	q
13	A	Christoph Harting	Germany	62.17	62.28	60.36	62.28	
14	B	Erik Cadée	Netherlands	61.75	62.14	x	62.14	
15	B	Martin Marić	Croatia	61.98	x	61.58	61.98	
16	B	Virgilijus Alekna	Lithuania	61.91	61.56	61.27	61.91	
17	A	Ercüment Olgundeniz	Turkey	59.55	60.81	x	60.81	
18	B	Gerhard Mayer	Austria	59.85	58.19	59.81	59.85	
19	A	Apostolos Parellis	Cyprus	59.84	56.95	59.08	59.84	
20	A	Benn Harradine	Australia	x	59.68	x	59.68	
21	B	Musab Ibrahim Al-Momani	Jordan	58.20	58.84	59.38	59.38	
22	B	Ronald Julião	Brazil	x	59.36	57.77	59.36	
23	A	Brett Morse	Great Britain & N.I.	x	59.23	58.60	59.23	
24	A	Niklas Arrhenius	Sweden	59.13	57.39	57.42	59.13	
25	A	Lance Brooks	United States	59.08	x	57.94	59.08	
26	A	Danijel Furtula	Montenegro	x	58.28	58.26	58.28	
27	B	Giovanni Faloci	Italy	57.23	55.66	57.54	57.54	
28	A	Mahmoud Samimi	Iran	x	57.38	57.77	57.77	
29	B	Alex Rose	Samoa	54.62	56.19	54.31	56.19	
30	B	Sultan Al-Dawoodi	Saudi Arabia	55.94	54.08	x	55.94	

=== Final ===
The final was started at 19:00.

Rank	Name	Nationality	No. 1	No. 2	No. 3	No. 4	No. 5	No. 6	Mark	Notes
1st place, gold medalist(s)	Robert Harting	Germany	62.16	68.13	x	69.11	-	69.08	69.11	
2nd place, silver medalist(s)	Piotr Małachowski	Poland	64.49	x	65.09	67.18	68.36	67.21	68.36	
3rd place, bronze medalist(s)	Gerd Kanter	Estonia	64.90	65.19	x	x	x	x	65.19	
4	Martin Wierig	Germany	x	63.72	x	65.02	x	63.42	65.02	
5	Victor Hogan	South Africa	64.35	62.84	60.98	61.69	x	63.44	64.35	
6	Robert Urbanek	Poland	63.58	62.20	64.32	64.01	62.05	62.70	64.32	
7	Vikas Gowda	India	63.41	x	62.20	64.03	63.67	63.64	64.03	
8	Victor Butenko	Russia	x	63.38	x	x	x	x	63.38	
9	Frank Casañas	Spain	62.40	62.89	61.26				62.89	
10	Jorge Fernández	Cuba	62.88	62.39	62.50				62.88	
11	Julian Wruck	Australia	60.91	61.80	62.40				62.40	
12	Mario Pestano	Spain	x	60.13	61.88				61.88	
