= Athletics at the 2010 Commonwealth Games – Men's discus throw =

Men's discus throw at the Commonwealth Games
- Venue: Jawaharlal Nehru Stadium
- Dates: 9 October (qualifying round); 10 October (final)
- Competitors: 15 from 9 nations
- Winning distance: 65.45 m

Medalists
gold medal	Benn Harradine	Australia
silver medal	Vikas Gowda	India
bronze medal	Carl Myerscough	England

The Men's discus throw at the 2010 Commonwealth Games as part of the athletics programme was held at the Jawaharlal Nehru Stadium on Saturday and Sunday 10 October 2010.

== Records ==
World Record	74.08	Jürgen Schult	GDR	Neubrandenburg, East Germany	6 June 1986
Games Record	66.39	Frantz Kruger	RSA	Manchester, England	27 July 2002

== Results ==
=== Qualifying round ===
Qualification: Qualifying Performance 60.00 (Q) or at least 12 best performers (q) advance to the Final.

Rank	Athlete	1	2	3	Result	Notes
1	Benn Harradine (AUS)	61.98			61.98	Q
2	Vikas Gowda (IND)	x	60.83		60.83	Q
3	Carl Myerscough (ENG)	x	48.66	60.02	60.02	Q
4	Apostolos Parellis (CYP)	58.84	58.40	58.98	58.98	q
5	Emeka Udechuku (ENG)	56.99	x	58.55	58.55	q
6	Brett Morse (WAL)	55.26	56.81	x	56.81	q
7	Chris Scott (ENG)	56.58	55.85	x	56.58	q
8	Julian Wruck (AUS)	51.66	56.42	x	56.42	q
9	Angus McInroy (SCO)	53.15	54.30	x	54.30	q
10	Orestis Antoniades (CYP)	51.49	x	52.93	52.93	q
11	Zane Duquemin (JER)	47.27	51.54	x	51.54	q PB
12	Petros Mitsides (CYP)	48.02	x	50.89	50.89	q
13	Anil Kumar (IND)	47.86	-	-	47.86	
14	Raobu Tarawa (KIR)	33.59	40.01	39.89	40.01	SB
	Fakapelu Sileti (TUV)	x	x	x	NM	

=== Final ===
Rank	Athlete	1	2	3	4	5	6	Result	Notes
1st place, gold medalist(s)	Benn Harradine (AUS)	60.18	64.73	61.20	65.45	60.47	64.88	65.45	
2nd place, silver medalist(s)	Vikas Gowda (IND)	62.84	63.69	61.83	63.26	63.24	x	63.69	SB
3rd place, bronze medalist(s)	Carl Myerscough (ENG)	58.86	60.64	x	56.91	x	x	60.64	
4	Apostolos Parellis (CYP)	59.80	60.12	59.13	59.15	60.51	x	60.51	
5	Emeka Udechuku (ENG)	54.52	59.50	x	58.57	58.44	59.59	59.59	
6	Brett Morse (WAL)	55.38	55.80	56.25	58.40	58.91	x	58.91	
7	Chris Scott (ENG)	54.77	55.08	57.05	56.08	55.32	x	57.05	
8	Julian Wruck (AUS)	55.50	56.15	56.28	x	56.69	x	56.69	
9	Petros Mitsides (CYP)	51.22	x	53.32				53.32	
10	Zane Duquemin (JER)	51.86	x	51.67				51.86	PB
11	Angus McInroy (SCO)	x	x	49.98				49.98	
12	Orestis Antoniades (CYP)	x	x	49.23				49.23	
