= Athletics at the 2014 Commonwealth Games – Men's discus throw =

Men's discus throw at the Commonwealth Games
- Venue: Hampden Park
- Competitors: 19
- Winning distance: 63.64 m

Medalists
gold medal	Vikas Gowda	India
silver medal	Apostolos Parellis	Cyprus
bronze medal	Jason Morgan	Jamaica

The Men's discus throw at the 2014 Commonwealth Games as part of the athletics programme took place at Hampden Park on 30 and 31 July 2014.

== Results ==
=== Qualifying round ===
Rank	Group	Name	#1	#2	#3	Result	Notes
1	A	Vikas Shive Gowda (IND)	64.32			64.32	Q
2	B	Victor Hogan (RSA)	x	59.16	64.16	64.16	Q/SB
3	B	Jason Morgan (JAM)	59.02	63.82		63.82	Q
4	A	Apostolos Parellis (CYP)	59.32	61.58	61.91	61.91	q
5	A	Chad Wright (JAM)	53.25	60.67	61.08	61.08	q
6	B	Benn Harradine (AUS)	61.06	58.83	x	61.06	q
7	B	Carl Myerscough (ENG)	59.46	59.95	57.49	59.95	q
8	B	Brett Morse (WAL)	59.65	59.85	x	59.85	q
9	A	Julian Wruck (AUS)	x	56.57	59.02	59.02	q
10	B	Orestis Antoniades (CYP)	x	51.80	57.91	57.91	q
11	B	Angus McInroy (SCO)	55.64	x	57.28	57.28	q/SB
12	B	Zane Duquemin (JER)	57.26	56.64	56.30	57.26	q
13	A	Nick Percy (SCO)	56.71	x	x	56.71	
14	A	Tom Norman (ENG)	55.06	55.31	x	55.31	
15	A	Eldred Henry (IVB)	x	x	51.39	51.39	
16	A	Elvino Pierre Louis (MRI)	x	49.98	50.57	50.57	
17	A	Dean William (SEY)	42.44	x	37.06	42.44	PB
18	A	Jinnam Hopotoa (NIU)	40.32	40.11	x	40.32	NR
19	B	Raobu Tarawa (KIR)	39.23	37.14	37.96	39.23	

=== Final ===
Rank	Name	#1	#2	#3	#4	#5	#6	Result	Notes
1st place, gold medalist(s)	Vikas Shive Gowda (IND)	60.63	62.09	63.64	x	62.17	x	63.64	
2nd place, silver medalist(s)	Apostolos Parellis (CYP)	58.88	63.32	57.94	58.51	59.18	52.62	63.32	
3rd place, bronze medalist(s)	Jason Morgan (JAM)	62.18	62.34	x	x	x	61.89	62.34	
4	Benn Harradine (AUS)	59.81	59.76	x	60.33	x	61.91	61.91	
5	Brett Morse (WAL)	53.87	x	59.49	60.48	59.49	60.00	60.48	
6	Chad Wright (JAM)	57.12	60.33	x	58.79	x	x	60.33	
7	Carl Myerscough (ENG)	58.17	x	59.88	x	59.16	x	59.88	
8	Zane Duquemin (JER)	57.53	x	59.39	x	59.16	x	59.39	
9	Julian Wruck (AUS)	x	58.31	58.37				58.37	
10	Victor Hogan (RSA)	x	x	56.42				56.42	
11	Orestis Antoniades (CYP)	53.12	x	54.47				54.47	
12	Angus McInroy (SCO)	53.33	x	54.12				54.12	
