= Athletics at the 2012 Summer Olympics – Men's discus throw =

Men's discus throw at the Games of the XXX Olympiad
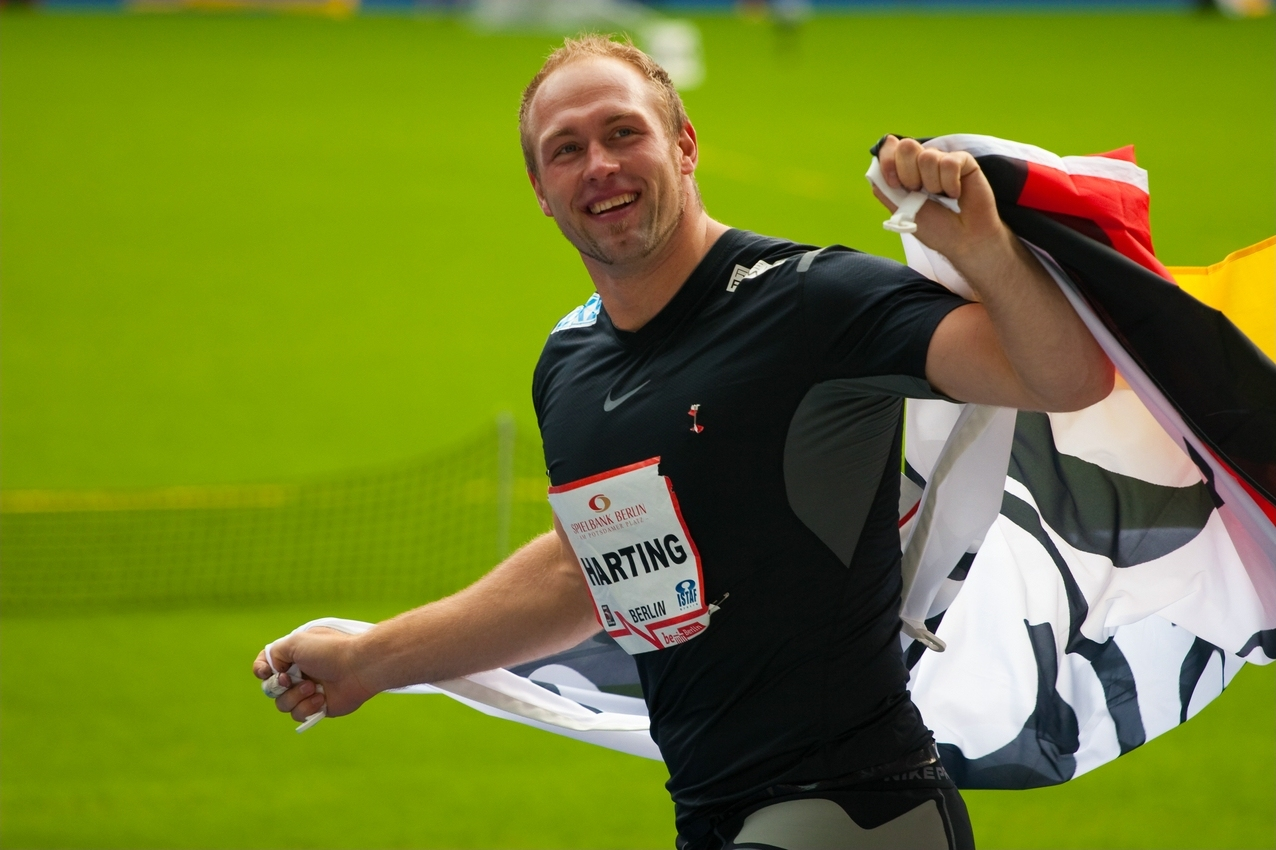
- Robert Harting (later in 2012)
- Venue: Olympic Stadium
- Dates: 6–7 August
- Competitors: 41 from 24 nations
- Winning distance: 68.27

Medalists
1st place, gold medalist(s)		Robert Harting; Germany
2nd place, silver medalist(s)		Ehsan Haddadi; Iran
3rd place, bronze medalist(s)		Gerd Kanter; Estonia

Official Video Highlights

The men's discus throw was a competition at the 2012 Summer Olympics in London, United Kingdom. The event was held at the Olympic Stadium on 6–7 August. Forty-one athletes from 24 nations competed. The event was won by Robert Harting of Germany, the nation's first victory in the men's discus throw since 1996 and second overall (not counting those won by East and West Germany). Ehsan Haddadi earned Iran's first medal in the event with his silver. Gerd Kanter of Estonia became the 15th man to win multiple medals in the event, adding a bronze to his 2008 gold. Virgilijus Alekna of Lithuania narrowly missed being the second man to win four medals in the event, finishing fourth.

The medals for the competition were presented by Irena Szewińska, Poland; IOC Member, and the medalists' bouquets were presented by Helmut Digel, Germany; IAAF Council Member.

== Background ==
This was the 27th appearance of the event, which is one of 12 athletics events to have been held at every Summer Olympics. The returning finalists from the 2008 Games were gold medalist Gerd Kanter of Estonia, silver medalist Piotr Małachowski of Poland, bronze medalist (and 2000 and 2004 gold medalist and 1996 finalist) Virgilijus Alekna of Lithuania, fourth-place finisher Robert Harting of Germany, fifth-place finisher Frank Casañas of Spain, sixth-place finisher Bogdan Pishchalnikov of Russia, seventh-place finisher Rutger Smith of the Netherlands, ninth-place finisher Mario Pestano of Spain, and twelfth-place finisher (and 2004 bronze medalist and 2000 finalist) Aleksander Tammert of Estonia. Harting, who had won the last two world championships, was the favorite. Kanter, Alekna, and Ehsan Haddadi of Iran were also contenders.

Cyprus, Jamaica, and Montenegro each made their debut in the men's discus throw. The United States made its 26th appearance, most of any nation, having missed only the boycotted 1980 Games.

== Qualification ==
A National Olympic Committee (NOC) could enter up to 3 qualified athletes in the men's discus throw event if all athletes met the A standard, or 1 athlete if they met the B standard. The maximum number of athletes per nation had been set at 3 since the 1930 Olympic Congress. The qualifying distance standards could be obtained in various meets during the qualifying period that had the approval of the IAAF. Both outdoor and indoor meets were eligible. The A standard for the 2012 men's discus throw was 65.00 metres; the B standard was 63.00 metres. The qualifying period for was from 1 May 2011 to 8 July 2012. NOCs could also have an athlete enter the discus throw through a universality place. NOCs could enter one male athlete in an athletics event, regardless of time, if they had no male athletes meeting the qualifying A or B standards in any men's athletic event.

== Competition format ==
Each athlete received three throws in the qualifying round. All who achieved the qualifying distance of 65.00 metres progressed to the final. If fewer than twelve athletes achieved this mark, then the twelve furthest throwing athletes reached the final. Each finalist was allowed three throws in last round, with the top eight athletes after that point being given three further attempts.

== Records ==
Prior to the competition, the existing world and Olympic records were as follows.

World record	Jürgen Schult (GDR)	74.08	Neubrandenburg, East Germany	6 June 1986
Olympic record	Virgilijus Alekna (LTU)	69.89	Athens, Greece	23 August 2004

No new world or Olympic records were set during the competition.

== Schedule ==
All times are British Summer Time (UTC+1)

Date	Time	Round
Monday, 6 August 2012	10:00	Qualifying
Tuesday, 7 August 2012	19:45	Final

== Summary ==
Six made the automatic qualifier to the finals, Ehsan Haddadi, Jorge Fernandez and Robert Harting on their first attempt. The top qualifier was defending champion Gerd Kanter, but it took him three throws to get a distance that would qualify. The #10 qualifier was two-time champion Virgilijus Alekna.

In the final, most improved their distances by several meters. Alekna launched a 67.38 on the third throw of the competition. Four throws later, Haddadi took the lead with a 68.18, with Harting moving into second place with 67.79. That was the situation through the first four rounds. Kanter made minor improvements, but was out of the medals until his fifth throw of 68.03, knocking Alekna out of his fourth straight medal. Two throws later, Harting launched the winner, going just 9 cm beyond Haddadi with a 68.27. The 2.01m, 130 kg. Harting celebrated his medal on his victory lap skillfully jumping over the row of women's hurdles already on the track and doing a Hulk Hogan shirt rip.

== Results ==
=== Qualifying ===
Qual. rule: qualification standard 65.00m (Q) or at least best 12 qualified (q).

Rank	Group	Athlete	Nation	1	2	3	Distance	Notes
1	B	Gerd Kanter	Estonia	X	59.72	66.39	66.39	Q
2	B	Robert Harting	Germany	66.22	—	—	66.22	Q
3	B	Jorge Fernandez	Cuba	65.34	—	—	65.34	Q
4	B	Lawrence Okoye	Great Britain	X	63.00	65.28	65.28	Q
5	A	Vikas Gowda	India	63.52	65.20	—	65.20	Q
6	A	Ehsan Haddadi	Iran	65.19	—	—	65.19	Q
7	A	Piotr Małachowski	Poland	62.08	64.65	63.96	64.65	q
8	B	Martin Wierig	Germany	64.13	62.66	X	64.13	q
9	B	Benn Harradine	Australia	64.00	X	61.39	64.00	q
10	A	Virgilijus Alekna	Lithuania	62.32	63.88	X	63.88	q
11	A	Frank Casañas	Spain	X	63.76	60.21	63.76	q
12	A	Erik Cadée	Netherlands	63.55	X	X	63.55	q
13	A	Apostolos Parellis	Cyprus	63.48	62.49	62.54	63.48	
14	B	Mario Pestano	Spain	63.40	63.36	X	63.40	
15	B	Bogdan Pishchalnikov	Russia	61.69	X	63.15	63.15	
16	B	Rutger Smith	Netherlands	63.00	62.70	63.09	63.09	
17	B	Martin Marić	Croatia	61.04	62.83	62.87	62.87	
18	A	Jason Young	United States	62.18	X	X	62.18	
19	A	Scott Martin	Australia	58.15	57.67	62.14	62.14	
20	B	Traves Smikle	Jamaica	X	59.59	61.85	61.85	
21	B	Lance Brooks	United States	61.17	60.59	59.25	61.17	
22	B	Przemyslaw Czajkowski	Poland	58.73	X	61.08	61.08	
23	A	Ercüment Olgundeniz	Turkey	X	X	60.87	60.87	
24	B	Gerhard Mayer	Austria	59.40	60.81	60.27	60.81	
25	A	Märt Israel	Estonia	59.60	X	60.34	60.34	
26	B	Omar Ahmed El Ghazaly	Egypt	60.16	60.26	58.89	60.26	
27	A	Aleksander Tammert	Estonia	57.00	60.20	59.78	60.20	
28	A	Julian Wruck	Australia	58.01	60.08	59.64	60.08	
29	B	Abdul Buhari	Great Britain	54.20	55.78	60.08	60.08	
30	A	Markus Münch	Germany	59.95	59.34	X	59.95	
31	B	Jarred Rome	United States	X	X	59.57	59.57	
32	A	Robert Urbanek	Poland	59.56	X	X	59.56	
33	B	Sultan Mubarak Al-Dawoodi	Saudi Arabia	55.48	55.80	59.54	59.54	
34	B	Mykyta Nesterenko	Ukraine	X	58.22	59.17	59.17	
35	A	Brett Morse	Great Britain	X	58.18	X	58.18	
36	A	Roland Varga	Croatia	57.76	58.17	57.79	58.17	
37	A	Germán Lauro	Argentina	X	55.23	57.54	57.54	
38	B	Danijel Furtula	Montenegro	57.48	X	X	57.48	
39	A	Jason Morgan	Jamaica	56.25	56.72	57.46	57.46	
40	A	Yunio Lastre	Cuba	X	X	57.33	57.33	
41	B	Ronald Julião	Brazil	X	56.20	X	56.20	

=== Final ===
Rank	Athlete	Nation	1	2	3	4	5	6	Distance	Notes
1st place, gold medalist(s)	Robert Harting	Germany	67.79	X	67.27	66.45	68.27	67.08	68.27	
2nd place, silver medalist(s)	Ehsan Haddadi	Iran	68.18	64.09	67.28	66.98	X	X	68.18	
3rd place, bronze medalist(s)	Gerd Kanter	Estonia	65.07	65.79	66.02	65.96	68.03	66.99	68.03	SB
4	Virgilijus Alekna	Lithuania	67.38	X	X	66.07	X	X	67.38	
5	Piotr Małachowski	Poland	62.50	66.92	X	67.19	X	X	67.19	
6	Martin Wierig	Germany	63.34	63.98	X	65.85	64.79	65.12	65.85	
7	Frank Casañas	Spain	65.56	X	X	64.92	65.48	63.16	65.56	
8	Vikas Gowda	India	64.79	60.95	63.03	64.15	64.48	63.89	64.79	
9	Benn Harradine	Australia	58.24	63.16	63.59	Did not advance			63.59	
10	Erik Cadée	Netherlands	62.40	62.77	62.78	Did not advance			62.78	
11	Jorge Fernandez	Cuba	X	60.04	62.02	Did not advance			62.02	
12	Lawrence Okoye	Great Britain	61.03	X	60.11	Did not advance			61.03	
