= Croatia at the 2010 European Athletics Championships =

- WA code: CRO

in Barcelona
- Competitors: 12
- Medals: Gold 2 Silver 0 Bronze 0 Total 2

European Athletics Championships appearances
- 1994; 1998; 2002; 2006; 2010; 2012; 2014; 2016; 2018; 2022; 2024; 2026

Croatia was represented by 12 athletes (7 men and 5 women) at the 2010 European Athletics Championships held in Barcelona, Spain, from 27 July to 1 August 2010. Two Croatian female athletes won gold medals: Sandra Perković in discus throw and Blanka Vlašić in high jump.

== Participants ==
=== Men ===
==== Track and field events ====
Athlete	Events	Heat		Semifinal		Final	
Athlete	Events	Result	Rank	Result	Rank	Result	Rank
Jurica Grabušić	110 m hurdles	13.69	13 q	Did not Finish		Did not advance	

==== Field events ====
Event	Athletes	Qualification		Final	
Event	Athletes	Result	Rank	Result	Rank
Shot put	Nedžad Mulabegović	20.01	7 Q	20.56 (PB)	6
Discus throw	Martin Marić	62.27	11 q	62.53	10
Discus throw	Roland Varga	61.55	14	Did not advance	
Discus throw	Marin Premeru	58.03	30	Did not advance	
Hammer throw	Andras Haklits	70.84	21	Did not advance	

=== Women ===
==== Track and road events ====
Athlete	Events	Heat		Semifinal		Final	
Athlete	Events	Result	Rank	Result	Rank	Result	Rank
Nikolina Horvat	400 m hurdles	56.64 (SB)	17	Did not advance			

==== Field events ====
Event	Athletes	Qualification		Final	
Event	Athletes	Result	Rank	Result	Rank
High jump	Blanka Vlašić	1.92	1 Q	2.03	1st place, gold medalist(s)
High jump	Ana Šimić	1.83	22	Did not advance	
Discus throw	Sandra Perković	57.70	10 q	64.67	1st place, gold medalist(s)
Discus throw	Vera Begić	55.04	16	Did not advance	

== Results ==
2010 Barcelona	Gold	Silver	Bronze	Total
Croatia (CRO)	2	0	0	2
