= Aaron Neighbour =

Australian athlete

Aaron Neighbour (born 2 December 1977) is a retired Australian discus thrower and shot putter.

He finished sixth in the shot put at the 1998 Commonwealth Games and eleventh in the discus throw at the 2006 Commonwealth Games where he threw 49.61m.

Neighbour became Australian discus champion in 2001. His personal best discus throw was 64.26 metres, achieved in May 2008 in Salinas, California. His personal best shot put was 18.95 metres, achieved in July 1998 in Melbourne.

Neighbour won the 2009 World Highland Games Championships held in Edinburgh, Scotland.

Neighbour's sister Gabrielle has won three senior national titles in Hammer Throw, and represented Australia three times in that event at the Commonwealth Games.
