= Jason Morgan (discus thrower) =

Jamaican discus thrower (born 1982)

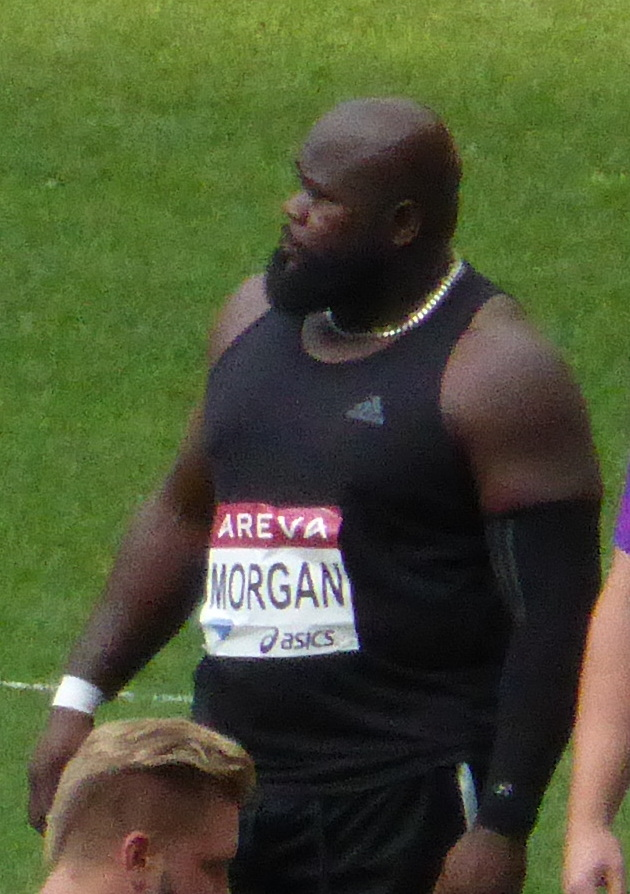
- Jason Morgan in 2015

Personal information
- Nickname: Dadz
- Born: 6 October 1982 (age 43) Kingston, Jamaica
- Height: 6 ft 3 in (1.91 m)
- Weight: 139 kg (306 lb)

Sport
- Country: Jamaica
- Sport: Track and field
- Event: Discus throw
- College team: Louisiana Tech
- Coached by: Self

Achievements and titles
- Personal best: Discus throw: 68.19m
Medal record
Men's athletics
Representing Jamaica
Commonwealth Games
Bronze medal – third place	2014 Glasgow	Discus throw
CAC Championships
Gold medal – first place	2011 Mayagüez	Discus throw
Bronze medal – third place	2009 Havana	Discus throw
Central American and Caribbean Games
Gold medal – first place	2010 Mayagüez	Discus throw
Silver medal – second place	2006 Cartagena	Discus throw
CARIFTA Games Junior (U20)
Silver medal – second place	2001 Bridgetown	Shot put
Representing Americas
Continental Cup
Bronze medal – third place	2014 Marrakesh	Discus throw

Jason Morgan (born 6 October 1982) is a Jamaican discus thrower. On 6 June 2015 Morgan achieved the Jamaican record in the discus throw (68.19 meters).

He won the silver medal at the 2006 Central American and Caribbean Games. He also competed at the 2007 World Championships 2011 World Championships the 2015 World championships and 2012 Summer Olympics without reaching the final. He is the first Jamaican in history to compete at a World championships in Athletics in the discus throw.

== Achievements ==
=== Competition record ===
Year	Competition	Venue	Position	Event	Notes
Representing Jamaica
2000	CAC Junior Championships (U20)	San Juan, Puerto Rico	10th	Shot put	11.81 m
2001	CARIFTA Games (U20)	Bridgetown, Barbados	2nd	Shot put	14.63 m
2001	Pan American Junior Championships	Santa Fe, Argentina	11th	Shot put	13.36 m
2001	Pan American Junior Championships	Santa Fe, Argentina	8th	Discus	43.84 m
2002	Central American and Caribbean Games	San Salvador, El Salvador	4th	Shot put	16.06 m
2002	Central American and Caribbean Games	San Salvador, El Salvador	5th	Discus	48.26 m
2004	NACAC U-23 Championships	Sherbrooke, Canada	6th	Shot put	15.23 m
2004	NACAC U-23 Championships	Sherbrooke, Canada	5th	Discus	50.17 m
2006	Central American and Caribbean Games	Cartagena, Colombia	8th	Shot put	16.47 m
2006	Central American and Caribbean Games	Cartagena, Colombia	2nd	Discus throw	56.56 m
2007	Pan American Games	Rio de Janeiro, Brazil	10th	Discus throw	50.09 m
2007	World Championships	Osaka, Japan	28th (q)	Discus throw	55.32 m
2009	Central American and Caribbean Championships	Havana, Cuba	3rd	Discus throw	57.47 m
2010	Central American and Caribbean Games	Mayagüez, Puerto Rico	1st	Discus throw	59.43 m
2011	Central American and Caribbean Championships	Mayagüez, Puerto Rico	1st	Discus throw	60.20 m
2011	World Championships	Daegu, South Korea	18th (q)	Discus throw	61.75 m
2011	Pan American Games	Guadalajara, Mexico	7th	Discus throw	58.91 m
2012	Olympic Games	London, United Kingdom	39th (q)	Discus throw	57.46 m
2014	Commonwealth Games	Glasgow, United Kingdom	3rd	Discus throw	62.34 m
2014	IAAF Continental Cup	Marrakesh, Morocco	3rd	Discus throw	62.70 m
2015	World Championships	Beijing, China	22nd (q)	Discus throw	60.85 m

== See also ==
- List of Jamaican records in athletics
