= Athletics at the 2006 Commonwealth Games – Men's discus throw =

Sport

Men's discus throw at the Commonwealth Games

The men's discus throw event at the 2006 Commonwealth Games was held on March 21–23.

== Medalists ==
Gold	Silver	Bronze
Scott Martin; Australia	Jason Tunks; Canada	Dariusz Slowik; Canada

== Results ==
=== Qualification ===
Qualification: 60.00 m (Q) or at least 12 best (q) qualified for the final.

Rank	Group	Athlete	Nationality	#1	#2	#3	Result	Notes
1	B	Jason Tunks	Canada	64.07			64.07	Q
2	A	Scott Martin	Australia	60.63			60.63	Q
3	A	Dariusz Slowik	Canada	53.98	58.41	60.55	60.55	Q
4	A	Vikas Gowda	India	60.25			60.25	Q
5	B	Benn Harradine	Australia	59.70	–	–	59.70	q
6	B	Hannes Hopley	South Africa	54.14	58.71	x	58.71	q
7	A	Carl Myerscough	England	54.68	56.79	58.29	58.29	q
8	B	Chukwuemeka Udechuku	England	55.95	57.90	56.41	57.90	q
9	A	Aaron Neighbour	Australia	54.48	x	57.34	57.34	q
10	A	Janus Robberts	South Africa	x	51.39	54.38	54.38	q
11	B	Petros Mitsides	Cyprus	50.69	50.63	51.60	51.60	q
12	A	Shaka Sola	Samoa	48.25	49.58	x	49.58	q
13	B	Adonson Shallow	Saint Vincent and the Grenadines	46.32	x	x	46.32	
14	B	Michael Letterlough	Cayman Islands	39.86	x	43.91	43.91	
15	A	Dumsane Fakudze	Swaziland	43.01	x	x	43.01	
16	B	Anthony Soalla-Bell	Sierra Leone	x	41.87	42.86	42.86	

=== Final ===
Rank	Athlete	Nationality	#1	#2	#3	#4	#5	#6	Result	Notes
1st place, gold medalist(s)	Scott Martin	Australia	61.34	58.71	59.51	60.89	60.55	63.48	63.48	
2nd place, silver medalist(s)	Jason Tunks	Canada	63.07	x	x	x	61.99	x	63.07	
3rd place, bronze medalist(s)	Dariusz Slowik	Canada	57.93	58.44	x	x	61.49	58.12	61.49	
4	Hannes Hopley	South Africa	60.99	59.40	57.78	x	59.22	60.63	60.99	
5	Carl Myerscough	England	56.05	60.18	58.18	x	59.44	60.64	60.64	
6	Vikas Gowda	India	x	56.20	x	59.90	60.08	x	60.08	
7	Chukwuemeka Udechuku	England	55.14	58.80	57.59	59.36	58.82	x	59.36	
8	Benn Harradine	Australia	55.95	54.42	x	57.87	x	58.87	58.87	
9	Janus Robberts	South Africa	54.83	55.57	x				55.57	
10	Petros Mitsides	Cyprus	51.63	49.77	52.99				52.99	
11	Aaron Neighbour	Australia	49.32	49.61	x				49.61	
12	Shaka Sola	Samoa	x	x	47.74				47.74	
