= Dariusz Slowik =

Polish-Canadian discus thrower

Personal information
- Born: 15 August 1977 (age 48)

Sport
- Sport: Track and field
Medal record
Representing Canada
Commonwealth Games
Bronze medal – third place	2006 Melbourne	Discus throw
Pan American Games
Bronze medal – third place	2007 Rio de Janeiro	Discus throw

Dariusz Robert Slowik (born 15 August 1977) is a retired Polish-Canadian discus thrower. He competed for Denmark until his Danish residence permit was revoked, and then began representing Canada.

== Life and career ==
Born in Poland, Slowik grew up in Denmark, and for Denmark he competed at the 1996 World Junior Championships and the 1999 European U23 Championships without reaching the final. He also became Danish discus champion in 1998.

Following studies in Canada between 2000 and 2002, Slowik's Danish residence permit was revoked, barring him from participating at the 2002 European Athletics Championships. He proceeded to gain Canadian citizenship.

Dariusz qualified for 2004 Summer Olympics by throwing over 64 meters 3 times, but received his Canadian citizenship too late and could not compete.

For Canada, Slowik won the bronze medals at the 2006 Commonwealth Games and the 2007 Pan American Games. His personal best throw was 64.56 metres, achieved in July 2004 in Allston.

He worked as an actor in the 2012 feature film This Means War, starring Tom Hardy and Chris Pine. He also acted in the television series Fringe in season 4 episode 2 as ND Fringe agent.

He also does charity fundraising and broke a Guinness World Record for single arm bench press in one hour and was mentioned in Guinness Book of Records 2018 and 2022. Then in 2021, he achieved another Guinness record in category "Most weight lifted by lateral raises in one minute whilst standing on a Swiss ball" with 640 kilograms. He currently holds 5 Guinness world records.
