= Jorge Fernández (athlete) =

Cuban discus thrower (born 1987)

Personal information
- Full name: Jorge Yadián Fernández Hernández
- Born: 2 October 1987 (age 38) Cárdenas, Cuba
- Height: 1.90 m (6 ft 3 in)
- Weight: 100 kg (220 lb)

Sport
- Country: Cuba
- Sport: Athletics
- Event: Discus
Medal record
Men's athletics
Representing Cuba
Pan American Games
Gold medal – first place	2011 Guadalajara	Discus throw
CAC Championships
Gold medal – first place	2008 Cali	Discus throw
Gold medal – first place	2009 Havana	Discus throw
- Updated on 27 December 2014

Jorge Fernández (full name Jorge Yadián Fernández Hernández; born 2 October 1987) is a Cuban track and field athlete who competes in the discus throw. He won the gold medal in the event at the Pan American Games in 2011 and is a two-time winner at the Central American and Caribbean Championships in Athletics (2008 and 2009). His personal best throw is 66.50 m, set in Lausanne in 2014.

== Career ==
Born in Matanzas, Fernández won his first international medal at the 2005 Pan American Junior Athletics Championships, where he came second in the discus behind Ryan Whiting of the United States. That same year, he threw a Caribbean junior best of 58.12 m with the 1.75 kg discus. He also competed with the senior implement and was third at the national championships and sixth at the 2005 ALBA Games. In 2006, he improved to set a national junior record of 60.06 m and finished fifth at the 2006 World Junior Championships in Athletics in Beijing.

In his first year as a senior athlete, he set a personal best of 57.57 m and won the discus title at the 2007 ALBA Games. He cleared the 60 m mark numerous times in 2008, setting a new personal best of 63.31 m in Havana in June. He was chosen to compete at the 2008 Central American and Caribbean Championships and came away with the gold medal, finishing just ahead of fellow Cuban Yunior Lastre. Fernández made his Olympic debut at the age of twenty a month later and finished 15th in his qualifying group at the 2008 Beijing Games.

His 2009 season was entirely based in Havana: he won the discus titles at the 2009 ALBA Games and then the Barrientos Memorial. He threw a new personal record mark of 63.92 m in June. The 2009 CAC Championships was held in the Cuban capital and he defended his region title to lead a discus 1–2 for the host nation alongside his compatriot Lastre. In the early part of 2010, he had a throw of 64.13 m then threw 66.00 m exactly in March in Havana. He won the Barrientos meet and the national championships before going on to take the bronze medal for Cuba at the 2010 Ibero-American Championships in Athletics in San Fernando, Cádiz. At the end of the track and field season, he was selected to represent a combined Americas team at the 2010 IAAF Continental Cup and he finished the competition in sixth place with a throw of 61.18 m.

Fernández started the 2011 season in strong form, throwing 65.54 m at the Copa Cuba meeting in March and winning at the Barrientos Memorial with a throw of 64.77 m in May. In his first year based in Europe, he had a season's best throw of 65.89 m came in Cottbus in June and won the Weltklasse in Biberach and Meeting de Atletismo Madrid competitions. At the 2011 World Championships in Athletics he was fourth in qualifying with a mark of 64.94 m, but fell short of this in the final, ending the final in eighth place with a best mark of 63.54 m. His year ended on a high as he won the gold medal at the 2011 Pan American Games in Guadalajara – his winning throw of 65.58 m was the best seen at the tournament in 24 years and he became the third Cuban to take the men's Pan American discus title (joining Roberto Moya and Luis Delís).

== Personal best ==
Event	Result	Venue	Date
Shot put	16.94 m	(Cuba) Havana	20 Mar 2014
Discus throw	66.50 m	(Switzerland) Lausanne	3 Jul 2014

== Competition record ==
Year	Competition	Venue	Position	Event	Notes
Representing Cuba
2005	ALBA Games	Havana, Cuba	6th	Discus throw	53.36 m
2005	Pan American Junior Championships	Windsor, Canada	2nd	Discus throw (1.75 kg)	57.87 m
2006	World Junior Championships	Beijing, China	5th	Discus throw (1.75 kg)	59.55 m
2007	ALBA Games	Caracas, Venezuela	1st	Discus throw	56.83 m
2008	Central American and Caribbean Championships	Cali, Colombia	1st	Discus throw	58.60 m A
2008	Olympic Games	Beijing, China	27th (q)	Discus throw	59.60 m
2009	ALBA Games	Havana, Cuba	1st	Discus throw	61.61 m
2009	Central American and Caribbean Championships	Havana, Cuba	1st	Discus throw	61.79 m
2010	Ibero-American Championships	San Fernando, Spain	3rd	Discus throw	61.76 m
2011	World Championships	Daegu, South Korea	8th	Discus throw	63.54 m
2011	Pan American Games	Guadalajara, Mexico	1st	Discus throw	65.58 m
2012	Olympic Games	London, United Kingdom	11th	Discus throw	62.02 m
2013	World Championships	Moscow, Russia	10th	Discus throw	62.88 m
2014	Pan American Sports Festival	Mexico City, Mexico	1st	Discus throw	64.94 m A
2014	Continental Cup	Marrakesh, Morocco	2nd	Discus throw	62.97
2014	Central American and Caribbean Games	Xalapa, Mexico	5th	Shot put	16.11 m A
2014	Central American and Caribbean Games	Xalapa, Mexico	1st	Discus throw	63.17 m A
2015	Pan American Games	Toronto, Canada	5th	Discus throw	62.04 m
2016	Olympic Games	Rio de Janeiro, Brazil	22nd (q)	Discus throw	60.43 m
2018	Central American and Caribbean Games	Barranquilla, Colombia	2nd	Discus throw	65.27 m
2019	Pan American Games	Lima, Peru	4th	Discus throw	64.24 m
2019	World Championships	Doha, Qatar	26th (q)	Discus throw	60.60 m
2023	ALBA Games	Caracas, Venezuela	2nd	Discus throw	61.88 m
2023	Central American and Caribbean Games	San Salvador, El Salvador	3rd	Discus throw	61.67 m
2023	Pan American Games	Santiago, Chile	7th	Discus throw	59.12 m
