= Daniel Schärer =

Swiss discus thrower

Daniel Schärer (born 20 October 1985) is a retired Swiss discus thrower.

Competing for the Stanford Cardinal track and field team, Schärer placed 3rd in the discus at the 2009 NCAA Division I Outdoor Track and Field Championships.

He finished eleventh at the 2007 European U23 Championships. He also competed at the 2007 Universiade and the 2009 World Championships without reaching the final.

His personal best throw was 63.55 metres, achieved in May 2009 in Eugene, Oregon.
