= Mihai Grasu =

Romanian athletics competitor

Personal information
- Nationality: Romanian
- Born: April 21, 1987 (age 38)

Sport
- Sport: Athletics
- Events: shot put; discus throw

Mihai Grasu (born 21 April 1987) is a retired Romanian shot putter and discus thrower.

In the discus throw he finished sixth at the 2006 World Junior Championships, fifth at the 2007 European U23 Championships fifth at the 2007 Universiade, tenth at the 2010 Universiade and twelfth at the 2011 Universiade. He also competed at the 2004 World Junior Championships, the 2009 European U23 Championships and the 2010 European Championships without reaching the final.

In the shot put he competed at the 2004 World Junior Championships and the 2006 World Junior Championships without reaching the final.

His personal best throw was 62.20 metres, achieved in May 2011 in Bucuresti. He had 18.69 metres in the shot put, achieved in July 2014 in Pitesti.
