= Athletics at the 2007 Summer Universiade – Men's discus throw =

The men's discus throw event at the 2007 Summer Universiade was held on 10–11 August.

== Medalists ==
Gold	Silver	Bronze
Gerhard Mayer; Austria	Omar Ahmed El Ghazaly; Egypt	Märt Israel; Estonia

== Results ==
=== Qualification ===
Qualification: 59.50 m (Q) or at least 12 best (q) qualified for the final.

Rank	Group	Athlete	Nationality	#1	#2	#3	Result	Notes
1	B	Omar Ahmed El Ghazaly	Egypt	57.14	61.11		61.11	Q
2	B	Märt Israel	Estonia	56.88	59.90		59.90	Q
3	A	Dzmitry Sivakou	Belarus	51.33	53.90	58.90	58.90	q
4	A	Gerhard Mayer	Austria	58.57	56.63	x	58.57	q
5	B	Oskars Siļčenoks	Latvia	57.85	–	–	57.85	q, PB
6	A	Stanislav Nesterovskyy	Ukraine	56.73	53.33	53.43	56.73	q
7	B	Ruslan Khlybau	Belarus	56.58	54.48	x	56.58	q
8	A	Mohammad Samimi	Iran	53.04	54.54	56.15	56.15	q
9	B	Martin Marić	Croatia	54.79	56.01	52.08	56.01	q
10	B	Pedro José Cuesta	Spain	55.67	54.65	55.52	55.67	q
11	A	Nikolaos Loukopoulos	Greece	55.60	53.16	51.81	55.60	q
12	A	Mihai Grasu	Romania	55.14	x	54.43	55.14	q
13	A	Apostolos Parellis	Cyprus	54.53	x	50.35	54.53	
14	A	Sergey Gribkov	Russia	52.31	50.82	53.14	53.14	
15	B	Nikolay Sedyuk	Russia	49.87	52.29	48.91	52.29	
16	A	Hendrik Voll	Estonia	50.86	50.80	51.84	51.84	
17	B	Daniel Schärer	Switzerland	x	48.12	49.11	49.11	
18	B	Kvanchai Numsomboon	Thailand	47.53	45.99	x	47.53	
19	A	Narong Benjaroon	Thailand	43.23	x	x	43.23	
20	B	Yves Sambou	Senegal	40.08	38.72	x	40.08	
	A	Charles Anywar	Uganda	x	x	x	NM	
	A	Sonam Rinzin	Bhutan	x	x	x	NM	
	B	Daniel Ayebe Abonga	Uganda	x	x	x	NM	
	B	Giovanni Faloci	Italy	x	x	x	NM	
	A	Abdulla Albuflasa	Qatar				DNS	

=== Final ===
Rank	Athlete	Nationality	#1	#2	#3	#4	#5	$6	Result	Notes
1st place, gold medalist(s)	Gerhard Mayer	Austria	58.35	x	60.11	60.59	57.85	61.55	61.55	
2nd place, silver medalist(s)	Omar Ahmed El Ghazaly	Egypt	60.61	60.89	x	60.84	60.87	x	60.89	
3rd place, bronze medalist(s)	Märt Israel	Estonia	58.98	60.32	59.11	x	x	x	60.32	
4	Dzmitry Sivakou	Belarus	56.33	57.77	59.36	x	58.11	x	59.36	
5	Mihai Grasu	Romania	55.06	55.44	56.06	58.12	58.38	x	58.38	
6	Oskars Siļčenoks	Latvia	57.40	x	55.97	x	x	x	57.40	
7	Pedro José Cuesta	Spain	56.30	56.29	55.34	x	56.76	56.32	56.76	
8	Martin Marić	Croatia	54.03	56.32	55.10	x	54.75	54.91	56.32	
9	Mohammad Samimi	Iran	x	52.91	55.57				55.57	
10	Stanislav Nesterovskyy	Ukraine	x	55.56	x				55.56	
11	Nikolaos Loukopoulos	Greece	55.43	53.10	52.76				55.43	
	Ruslan Khlybau	Belarus	x	x	x				NM	
