= Ronald Julião =

Brazilian athletics competitor

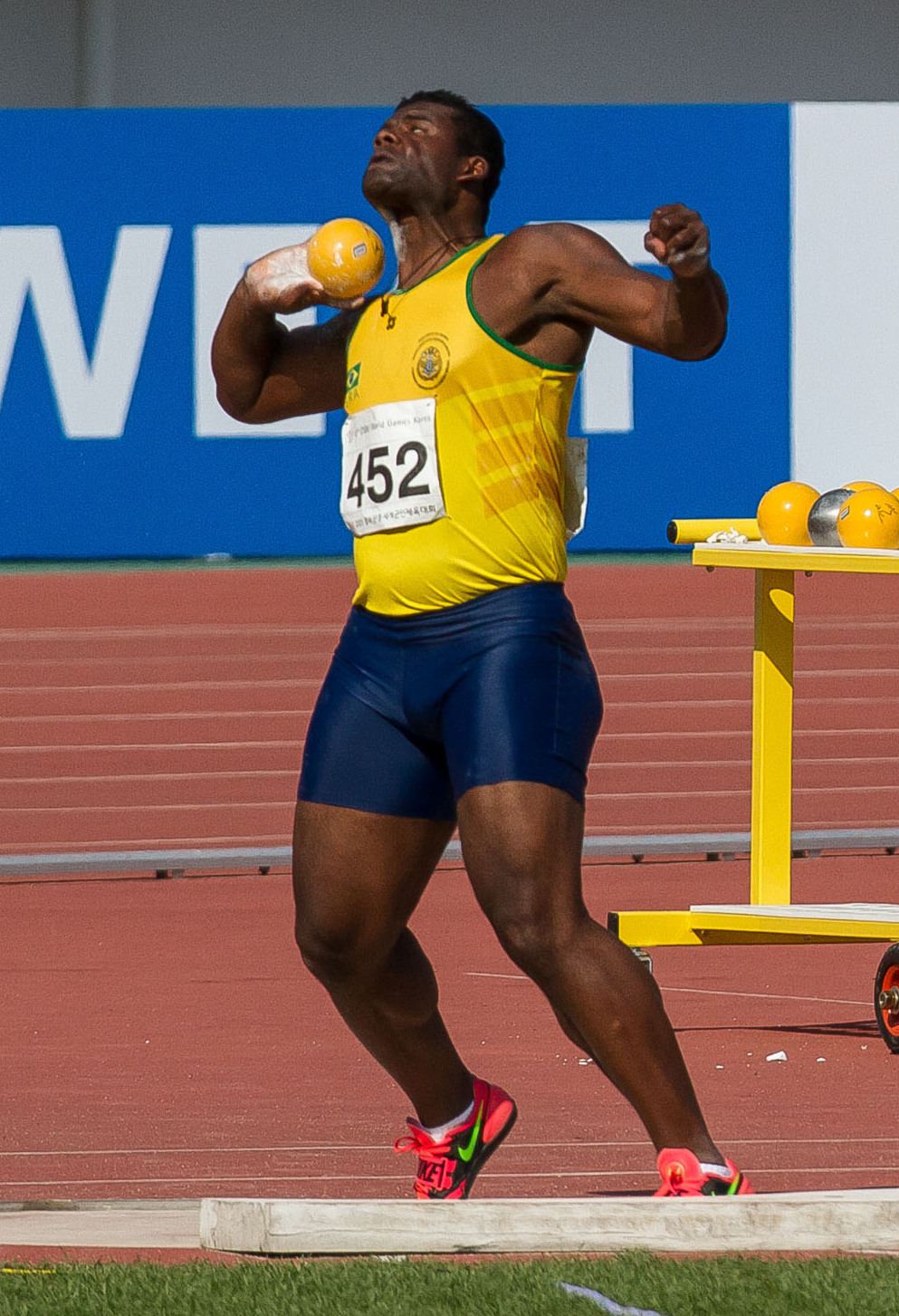
- Ronald Julião at the 2015 Military World Games

Personal information
- Full name: Ronald Odair de Oliveira Julião
- Born: June 16, 1985 (age 41) Caieiras, São Paulo
- Height: 1.94 m (6 ft 4 1/2 in)
- Weight: 113 kg (249 lb)

Sport
- Country: Brazil
- Sport: Athletics
- Event: Discus
Medal record
Pan American Games
Silver medal – second place	2015 Toronto	Discus throw
Bronze medal – third place	2011 Guadalajara	Discus throw
Universiade
Gold medal – first place	2013 Kazan	Discus throw
Bronze medal – third place	2011 Shenzhen	Discus throw
South American Championships
Gold medal – first place	2011 Buenos Aires	Discus throw
Silver medal – second place	2006 Tunja	Discus throw
Silver medal – second place	2007 São Paulo	Discus throw
Silver medal – second place	2009 Lima	Shot put
Bronze medal – third place	2005 Cali	Discus throw
Bronze medal – third place	2009 Lima	Discus throw
South American Youth Championships
Bronze medal – third place	2002 Asunción	Shot put
Lusophony Games
Representing Brazil
Bronze medal – third place	Macau 2006	Shot put
Bronze medal – third place	Lisbon 2009	Discus throw
- Updated on 24 January 2015

Ronald Odair de Oliveira Julião (born 16 June 1985) is a Brazilian track and field athlete who competes in the shot put and discus throw. He is a member of BM&F Bovespa's track club and is trained by João Paulo Alves da Cunha. He is the Brazilian record holder in the discus throw (65.55 m). He is the second highest ranked South American discus thrower after Jorge Balliengo and has won straight titles at the Brazil championships since 2005.

Julião is a five-time medallist in the discus at the South American Championships in Athletics and won the gold medal in the event in 2011 with a Championship record. He also won a silver medal in the shot put at the 2009 South American Championships. He won bronze medals in the discus at the Pan American Games and Summer Universiade in 2011.

== Career ==
=== Early career ===
Born in Caieiras in Brazil's Sao Paulo state, Ronald Julião attended Sebastião de Oliveira Gusmão school and began training in the shot put from the age of thirteen. He won the Ibirapuera schools meet in 1999 and an athletics coach, Fatima Aparecida Germano, offered to train him as a result. She taught him in the shot put and also added the discus throw event to his oeuvre. In his first major regional competition he took third place in the shot put at the 2002 South American Youth Championships. He came sixth in the shot at the 2003 South American Junior Championships in Athletics, but showed progression in the discus by taking second place with a throw of 56.36 m. He signed up with the BM&F Bovespa club in 2005 and began to establish himself in the senior ranks that year.

=== First regional medals ===
He won his first national discus title in 2005 and took the bronze medal in the event at the 2005 South American Championships in Athletics, also finishing sixth in the shot put. The following year he was runner-up to Argentine athletes twice in the discus. At the 2006 South American Championships in Athletics he finished behind Jorge Balliengo, then at the 2006 South American Under-23 Championships in Athletics he was beaten by Germán Lauro. Outside of the region, he was eighth in the shot put and fourth in the discus at the 2006 Ibero-American Championships in Athletics. In Macau he won his first international shot put medal, taking the bronze at the 2006 Lusophony Games.

In the 2007 season Julião improved his personal bests to 59.75 m for the discus and 17.81 m for the shot put. He came fifth at the 2007 South American Championships in Athletics with his shot put effort and was runner-up to Lauro in the discus competition. He was further down the rankings at the 2007 Pan American Games held in Rio de Janeiro, taking tenth place in the shot and sixth in the discus. He cleared eighteen metres in the shot put for the first time in May 2008, throwing 18.12 m at the South American GP meet in Uberlândia. He won both throwing national titles at the Brazilian Championships, but did not qualify for the 2008 Beijing Olympics. His sole international competition that year was the Ibero-American Championships, where he managed third in the discus.

Julião threw a shot put best of 18.19 m to take the silver medal at the 2009 South American Championships in Athletics – a performance that was better than that in his principal event, as he came third in the discus. Repeating his feat from three years previously, he came third in the shot at the 2009 Lusophony Games.

=== South American champion ===
He improved significantly as an athlete in the 2010 season. Under the advice of José Luis Martínez, a Spanish throwing coach, he had changed the focus of his training, moving away from building strength and towards technique-based methods. Clearing sixty metres in the discus for the first time, he opened the year with a Brazilian record of 60.40 m, beating José Araujo de Souza's mark which has stood since 1990. He broke the record three more times that year, culminating in a throw of 63.09 m at the Meeting de Atletismo Madrid. He also became the national indoor record holder in the shot put with a throw of 17.51 m. There were no major international competitions for Julião that year, but he placed fifth in the shot and sixth in the discus at the 2010 Ibero-American Championships. He improved his indoor shot put record to 17.94 m at the start of 2011. He was fourth in that event at the 2011 South American Championships in Athletics, but performed well in the discus by taking his first ever continental gold medal with a Championship record throw of 62.72 m. Still studying at university, his form peaked for the 2011 Summer Universiade held in Shenzhen. He broke the outdoor national record in the shot put with a throw of 18.78 m (coming ninth) and improved his discus mark to 63.30 m to leave the competition with the bronze medal. His last appearance for Brazil that year came at the 2011 Pan American Games, where he won another discus bronze medal.

Julião threw 65.41 m at the Grande Premio Brasil Caixa de Atletismo in May 2012, lifting him into second place on the all-time South American discus rankings behind Jorge Balliengo.

== Personal bests ==
- Shot put: 18.78 m – (China) Shenzhen, 16 August 2011
- Discus throw: 65.55 m – (United States) La Jolla, California, 27 April 2013

== Competition record ==
Year	Competition	Venue	Position	Event	Notes
Representing Brazil
2002	South American Youth Championships	Asunción, Paraguay	3rd	Shot put (5 kg)	16.80 m
2003	South American Junior Championships	Guayaquil, Ecuador	2nd	Discus throw (1.75 kg)	56.36 m
2003	Pan American Junior Championships	Bridgetown, Barbados	11th	Shot put (6 kg)	16.29 m
2003	Pan American Junior Championships	Bridgetown, Barbados	4th	Discus throw (1.75 kg)	54.93 m
2005	South American Championships	Cali, Colombia	6th	Shot put	16.97 m
2005	South American Championships	Cali, Colombia	4th	Discus throw	56.51 m
2006	Ibero-American Championships	Ponce, Puerto Rico	8th	Shot put	16.89 m
2006	Ibero-American Championships	Ponce, Puerto Rico	3rd^{*}	Discus throw	52.36 m
2006	South American Championships	Tunja, Colombia	7th^{**}	Shot put	15.95 m
2006	South American Championships	Tunja, Colombia	2nd	Discus throw	57.02 m
2006	Lusophony Games	Macau	3rd	Shot put	16.10 m
2006	South American U23 Championships / South American Games	Buenos Aires, Argentina	2nd	Discus throw	55.13 m
2007	South American Championships	São Paulo, Brazil	5th	Shot put	17.81 m
2007	South American Championships	São Paulo, Brazil	2nd	Discus throw	56.53 m
2007	Pan American Games	Rio de Janeiro	10th	Shot put	17.31 m
2007	Pan American Games	Rio de Janeiro	6th	Discus throw	54.36 m
2008	Ibero-American Championships	Iquique, Chile	6th	Shot put	17.64 m
2008	Ibero-American Championships	Iquique, Chile	3rd	Discus throw	56.77 m
2009	South American Championships	Lima, Peru	2nd	Shot put	18.19 m
2009	South American Championships	Lima, Peru	3rd	Discus throw	54.97 m
2009	Lusophony Games	Lisbon, Portugal	3rd	Shot put	17.63 m
2010	Ibero-American Championships	San Fernando, Spain	6th	Shot put	18.57 m
2010	Ibero-American Championships	San Fernando, Spain	5th	Discus throw	57.91 m
2011	South American Championships	Buenos Aires, Argentina	4th	Shot put	17.88 m
2011	South American Championships	Buenos Aires, Argentina	1st	Discus throw	62.72 m
2011	Universiade	Shenzhen, China	9th	Shot put	18.78 m (NR)
2011	Universiade	Shenzhen, China	3rd	Discus throw	63.30 m (NR)
2011	Pan American Games	Guadalajara, Mexico	9th	Shot put	17.94 m
2011	Pan American Games	Guadalajara, Mexico	3rd	Discus throw	61.70 m
2012	Ibero-American Championships	Barquisimeto, Venezuela	2nd	Discus throw	61.67 m
2012	Olympic Games	London, United Kingdom	41st (q)	Discus throw	56.20 m
2013	Universiade	Kazan, Russia	11th	Shot put	17.47 m
2013	Universiade	Kazan, Russia	1st	Discus throw	63.54 m
2013	World Championships	Moscow, Russia	22nd (q)	Discus throw	59.36 m
2014	South American Games	Santiago, Chile	2nd	Discus throw	59.12 m
2014	Ibero-American Championships	São Paulo, Brazil	3rd	Discus throw	59.75 m
2014	Pan American Sports Festival	Mexico City, Mexico	3rd	Discus	59.40m A
2015	South American Championships	Lima, Peru	2nd	Discus throw	59.80 m
2015	Pan American Games	Toronto, Canada	2nd	Discus throw	64.65 m
2015	World Championships	Beijing, China	21st (q)	Discus throw	61.02 m
2016	Ibero-American Championships	Rio de Janeiro, Brazil	1st	Discus throw	59.56 m
2017	South American Championships	Asunción, Paraguay	4th	Discus throw	55.89 m

^{*}: At the 2006 Ibero-American Championships, Ronald Julião as initially 4th, but Argentinian Marcelo Pugliese was disqualified because of doping violations.
^{**}: Competing out of competition.

National titles

- Discus throw: 2005 to 2015 (11)
- Shot put: 2008 to 2011 (4)
