= Robert Harting =

German discus thrower (born 1984)

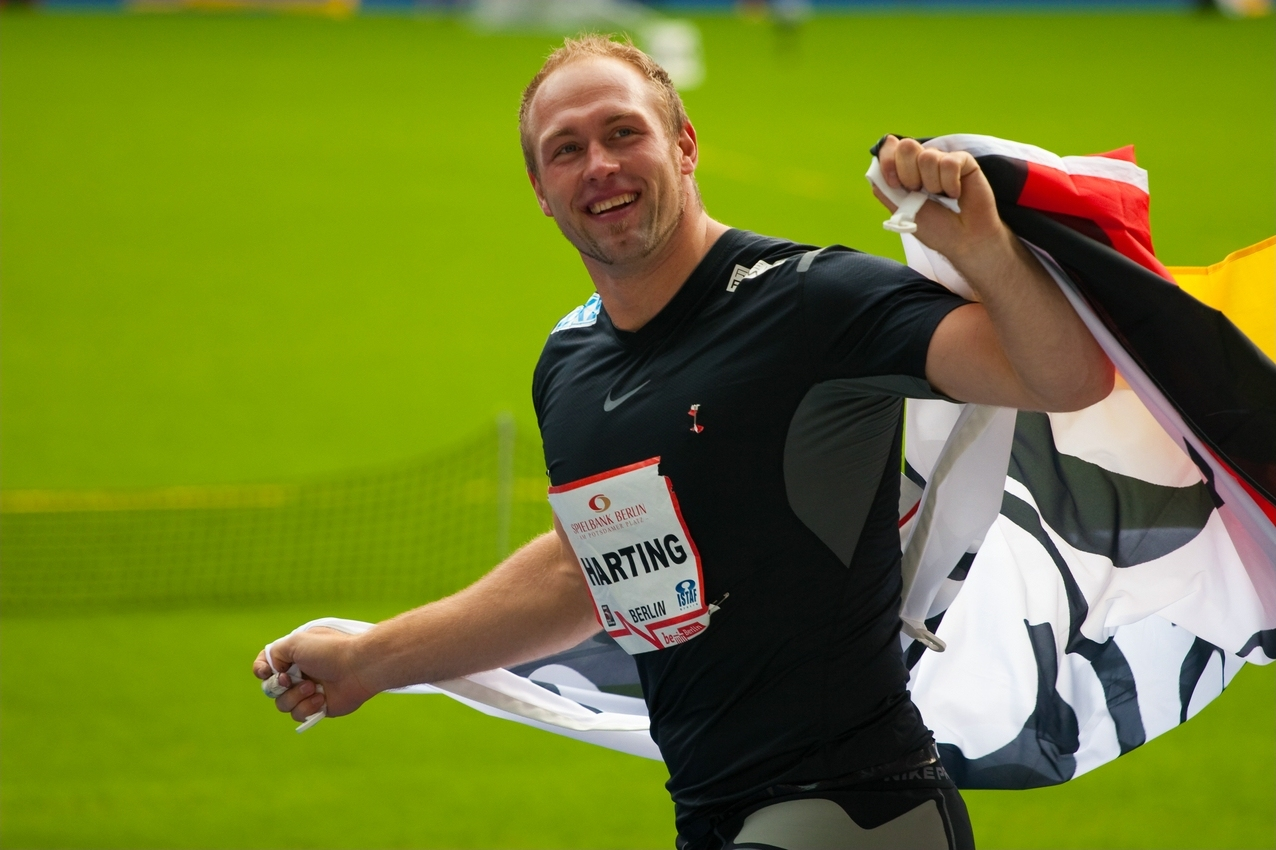
- Harting in 2012

Personal information
- Nickname: Shaggy
- Nationality: German
- Born: 18 October 1984 (age 41) Cottbus, East Germany
- Years active: 2001–2018
- Height: 2.01 m (6 ft 7 in)
- Weight: 126 kg (278 lb)

Sport
- Country: Germany
- Sport: Track and field
- Event: Discus throw
- Club: SCC Berlin
- Turned pro: 2001
- Coached by: Torsten Schmidt

Achievements and titles
- Personal best: 70.66 m
Medal record
Olympic Games
Gold medal – first place	2012 London	Discus
World Championships
Gold medal – first place	2009 Berlin	Discus
Gold medal – first place	2011 Daegu	Discus
Gold medal – first place	2013 Moscow	Discus
Silver medal – second place	2007 Osaka	Discus
European Championships
Gold medal – first place	2012 Helsinki	Discus
Gold medal – first place	2014 Zürich	Discus
Silver medal – second place	2010 Barcelona	Discus
Continental Cup
Gold medal – first place	2010 Split	Discus

Robert Harting (German pronunciation: [ˈʁoːbɛʁt ˈhaʁtɪŋ]; born 18 October 1984) is a retired German discus thrower. He represents the sports club SCC Berlin, his coach is Torsten Schmidt. He is a former Olympic, World, and European champion in the men's discus throw. His younger brother Christoph is the event's 2016 Olympic champion.

== Biography ==
Harting was born in Cottbus, East Germany. He won a silver medal at the 2001 World Youth Championships. He was less successful at subsequent championships and finished in eighth in the qualifiers 2002 World Junior Championships. He took the gold medal at the 2005 European Athletics U23 Championships.

He began competing at the senior level soon after and took part in the 2006 European Championships, where he just missed the qualifying mark in the earlier round of the competition. He improved in 2007, throwing a new personal best of 66.93 m and he won the silver medal at the 2007 World Championships. He was fourth at the 2007 IAAF World Athletics Final and then was second at the European Winter Throwing Cup the following year.

He threw a personal best of 68.65 m in Kaunas in June and was selected for the German team at the 2008 Beijing Olympics. He finished fourth with a throw of 67.09 m. He closed the season with a bronze medal at the 2008 IAAF World Athletics Final.

At the Berlin 2009 World Championships, Harting was sitting in the silver medal position coming into the 6th round of the final, he then threw a personal best of 69.43 metres to gain the lead and ultimately win the gold medal. The final remaining competitor and leader since the 1st round, Polish athlete Piotr Małachowski, was unable to better the German's throw.

Harting set a championship record of 66.80 m to win at the 2010 European Team Championships and recorded a mark of 68.67 m the following month at the 2010 German Athletics Championships to take the national title. He threw 68.47 m in the final of the 2010 European Athletics Championships but this was not enough to beat Małachowski. Still, the silver medal was his first at the primary continental championships. He competed in the 2010 IAAF Diamond League and won at the Weltklasse Zurich, but it was Małachowski who won the overall Diamond Race Trophy. He improved his personal best in Neubrandenburg in a one-on-one competition against Małachowski, taking the win with a throw of 69.69 m. He defended his world title at the 2011 World Championships in Athletics with a winning mark of 68.97 m.

In May 2012, Harting threw a personal best of 70.31 m at the Hallesche Werfertage Meeting, clearing seventy metres for the first time. At the 2012 European Athletics Championships in Helsinki, Finland, Harting won the gold medal by throwing 68.30 m. In the 2012 London Olympics, he won the gold medal in discus throwing.

He won his third straight world championship title at the 2013 World Championships in Moscow. In 2014, he retained the European title.

Harting is known for exuberant victory celebrations, including ripping the shirt off his chest, running with a German flag over the hurdles from the hurdles race, placing mascots on his shoulders and jogging on the track.

Awards and achievements
Preceded by Dirk Nowitzki	German Sportsman of the Year; 2012–2014	Succeeded by Jan Frodeno
