= Jan Marcell =

Czech shot putter and discus thrower (born 1985)

Jan Marcell (born 4 June 1985) is a Czech shot putter and discus thrower.

In the shot put he competed at the 2004 World Junior Championships and the 2010 World Indoor Championships without reaching the final. His personal best put is 20.20 metres, achieved in January 2010 in Prague.

In the discus throw he won the silver medal at the 2007 European U23 Championships and competed at the 2008 Olympic Games. His personal best throw is 66.00 metres, achieved in 2011 in Brno.

== Competition record ==
Year	Competition	Venue	Position	Event	Notes
Representing the Czech Republic
2004	World Junior Championships	Grosseto, Italy	31st (q)	Shot put (6 kg)	16.64 m
2007	European U23 Championships	Debrecen, Hungary	7th	Shot put	18.42 m
2007	European U23 Championships	Debrecen, Hungary	2nd	Discus throw	58.48 m
2008	Olympic Games	Beijing, China	28th (q)	Discus throw	59.52 m
2009	Universiade	Belgrade, Serbia	9th	Discus throw	57.74 m
2010	World Indoor Championships	Doha, Qatar	11th (q)	Shot put	20.04 m
2010	European Championships	Barcelona, Spain	23rd (q)	Discus throw	58.95 m
2011	World Championships	Daegu, South Korea	19th (q)	Shot put	19.51 m
2011	World Championships	Daegu, South Korea	13th (q)	Discus throw	62.29 m
2014	European Championships	Zürich, Switzerland	6th	Shot put	20.48 m
2015	European Indoor Championships	Prague, Czech Republic	15th (q)	Shot put	19.45 m
2015	World Championships	Beijing, China	10th	Shot put	19.69 m
