= Athletics at the 2009 Summer Universiade – Men's discus throw =

The men's discus throw event at the 2009 Summer Universiade was held on 11–12 July.

== Medalists ==
Gold	Silver	Bronze
Mohammad Samimi; Iran	Mahmoud Samimi; Iran	Markus Münch; Germany

== Results ==
=== Qualification ===
Qualification: 59.50 m (Q) or at least 12 best (q) qualified for the final.

Rank	Group	Athlete	Nationality	#1	#2	#3	Result	Notes
1	B	Märt Israel	Estonia	60.71			60.71	Q
2	A	Mahmoud Samimi	Iran	60.65			60.65	Q
3	B	Mohammad Samimi	Iran	60.51			60.51	Q
4	B	Markus Münch	Germany	60.18			60.18	Q
5	A	Michael Torie	United States	56.05	53.21	58.31	58.31	q
6	A	Apostolos Parellis	Cyprus	57.67	57.95	x	57.95	q
7	A	Martin Marić	Croatia	53.36	57.81	56.63	57.81	q
8	B	Jan Marcell	Czech Republic	57.75	x	x	57.75	q
9	A	Ivan Hryshyn	Ukraine	57.39	57.05	55.41	57.39	q
10	B	Mihai Grasu	Romania	x	56.05	57.31	57.31	q
11	A	Rosen Karamfilov	Bulgaria	x	56.10	x	56.10	q
12	A	Wang Yao-Hui	Chinese Taipei	52.57	55.62	x	55.62	q
13	A	Sascha Hordt	Germany	x	55.42	x	55.42	
14	A	Gleb Sidorchenko	Russia	x	55.18	51.93	55.18	
15	A	Oskars Vaisjūns	Latvia	x	53.12	54.90	54.90	
16	A	Siarhei Rohanau	Belarus	52.06	54.37	x	54.37	
17	B	Savvas Arestis	Cyprus	53.98	x	x	53.98	
18	B	Sergey Ryzhenko	Russia	53.65	53.75	53.15	53.75	
19	A	Pedro José Cuesta	Spain	53.30	46.40	51.66	53.30	
20	A	Vadim Hranovschi	Moldova	x	x	52.83	52.83	
21	B	Dale Stevenson	Australia	52.01	x	x	52.01	
22	B	Toni Velkov	Bulgaria	47.01	51.20	51.93	51.93	PB
23	B	David Mozsdenty	Hungary	51.25	51.27	x	51.27	
24	B	Tadej Hribar	Slovenia	50.07	x	x	50.07	
25	A	Donovan Snyman	South Africa	47.96	x	47.49	47.96	
26	B	Wong Wai Wong	Macau	36.74	37.27	35.71	37.27	
	B	Opeyemi Ayeni	Nigeria				DNS	

=== Final ===
Rank	Athlete	Nationality	#1	#2	#3	#4	#5	#6	Result	Notes
1st place, gold medalist(s)	Mohammad Samimi	Iran	58.86	x	63.52	57.71	64.40	65.33	65.33	PB
2nd place, silver medalist(s)	Mahmoud Samimi	Iran	62.36	x	61.64	58.66	62.85	64.67	64.67	PB
3rd place, bronze medalist(s)	Markus Münch	Germany	62.28	x	x	63.76	x	x	63.76	
4	Märt Israel	Estonia	60.81	x	61.36	x	63.35	x	63.35	
5	Ivan Hryshyn	Ukraine	x	54.68	61.32	x	x	x	61.32	PB
6	Apostolos Parellis	Cyprus	58.82	57.53	58.76	59.37	61.07	x	61.07	PB
7	Martin Marić	Croatia	53.97	58.09	58.37	x	x	x	58.37	
8	Rosen Karamfilov	Bulgaria	57.83	57.65	58.21	55.20	x	x	58.21	PB
9	Jan Marcell	Czech Republic	57.74	x	55.67				57.74	
10	Mihai Grasu	Romania	57.69	x	55.86				57.69	
11	Wang Yao-Hui	Chinese Taipei	x	56.97	x				56.97	PB
12	Michael Torie	United States	x	55.27	x				55.27	
