= 2010 European Athletics Championships – Men's discus throw =

Men's discus throw at the European Athletics Championships

The men's discus throw at the 2010 European Athletics Championships was held at the Estadi Olímpic Lluís Companys on 31 July and 1 August.

== Medalists ==
Gold	Piotr Małachowski; Poland (POL)
Silver	Robert Harting; Germany (GER)
Bronze	Róbert Fazekas; Hungary (HUN)

== Records ==
Standing records prior to the 2010 European Athletics Championships
World record	Jürgen Schult (GDR)	74.08	Neubrandenburg, East Germany	6 June 1986
European record	Jürgen Schult (GDR)	74.08	Neubrandenburg, East Germany	6 June 1986
Championship record	Róbert Fazekas (HUN)	68.83	Munich, Germany	11 August 2002
World Leading	Gerd Kanter (EST)	71.45	Chula Vista, United States	29 April 2010
European Leading	Gerd Kanter (EST)	71.45	Chula Vista, United States	29 April 2010
Broken records during the 2010 European Athletics Championships
Championship record	Piotr Małachowski (POL)	68.87	Barcelona, Spain	1 August 2010

== Schedule ==
Date	Time	Round
31 July 2010	10:10	Qualification
1 August 2010	19:45	Final

== Results ==
=== Qualification ===
Qualification: Qualification Performance 63.50 (Q) or at least 12 best performers advance to the final

Rank	Group	Athlete	Nationality	#1	#2	#3	Result	Notes
1	A	Robert Harting	Germany	63.17	66.93		66.93	Q
2	A	Gerd Kanter	Estonia	65.43			65.43	Q
3	B	Mario Pestano	Spain	62.47	64.95		64.95	Q
4	A	Róbert Fazekas	Hungary	64.30			64.30	Q
5	A	Märt Israel	Estonia	63.27	63.99		63.99	Q
6	A	Virgilijus Alekna	Lithuania	61.08	x	63.93	63.93	Q
7	B	Piotr Małachowski	Poland	63.69			63.69	Q
8	A	Frank Casañas	Spain	63.61			63.61	Q
9	B	Martin Wierig	Germany	x	58.64	62.57	62.57	q
10	A	Sergiu Ursu	Romania	x	61.11	62.43	62.43	q
11	B	Martin Maric	Croatia	61.26	62.27	x	62.27	q
12	B	Erik Cadée	Netherlands	61.86	x	61.97	61.97	q
13	A	Przemysław Czajkowski	Poland	59.36	60.87	61.97	61.97	
14	B	Roland Varga	Croatia	60.53	61.11	61.55	61.55	
15	B	Gerhard Mayer	Austria	59.88	59.31	60.76	60.76	
16	A	Bogdan Pishchalnikov	Russia	55.89	57.42	60.69	60.69	
17	A	Apostolos Parellis	Cyprus	x	58.09	60.57	60.57	SB
18	B	Aleksander Tammert	Estonia	60.07	59.38	58.98	60.07	
19	B	Frantz Kruger	Finland	59.55	x	x	59.55	
20	B	Zoltán Kővágó	Hungary	x	x	59.04	59.04	
21	A	Niklas Arrhenius	Sweden	60.25	57.30	58.98	60.25	
22	A	Mikko Kyyrö	Finland	58.02	58.96	x	58.96	
23	B	Jan Marcell	Czech Republic	x	58.95	57.73	58.95	
24	B	Markus Münch	Germany	58.81	58.25	x	58.81	
25	B	Mihai Grasu	Romania	57.61	x	58.55	58.55	
26	B	Dzmitry Sivakou	Belarus	57.42	58.53	x	58.53	
27	A	Gaute Myklebust	Norway	55.60	x	58.39	58.39	
28	A	Ivan Hryshyn	Ukraine	57.90	58.36	58.61	58.36	
29	B	Aleksas Abromavicius	Lithuania	58.05	x	x	58.05	
30	A	Marin Premeru	Croatia	x	57.85	58.03	58.03	
31	B	Oleksiy Semenov	Ukraine	x	x	56.42	56.42	
32	A	Libor Malina	Czech Republic	53.64	x	x	53.64	

=== Final ===
Rank	Athlete	Nationality	#1	#2	#3	#4	#5	#6	Result	Notes
1st place, gold medalist(s)	Piotr Małachowski	Poland	65.84	68.87	x	64.06	x	64.37	68.87	CR
2nd place, silver medalist(s)	Robert Harting	Germany	68.33	66.46	68.47	66.35	66.86	68.34	68.47	SB
3rd place, bronze medalist(s)	Róbert Fazekas	Hungary	64.84	64.85	66.43	x	64.65	66.15	66.43	
4	Gerd Kanter	Estonia	63.17	64.57	65.38	63.85	65.44	66.20	66.20	
5	Virgilijus Alekna	Lithuania	62.05	63.59	63.19	63.15	64.64	63.56	64.64	
6	Mario Pestano	Spain	64.41	61.02	64.51	63.98	63.38	62.57	64.51	
7	Martin Wierig	Germany	60.96	63.32	x	63.24	x	61.91	63.32	
8	Sergiu Ursu	Romania	60.73	61.36	63.11	x	61.90	62.11	63.11	
9	Märt Israel	Estonia	x	62.59	x				62.59	
10	Martin Maric	Croatia	61.52	x	62.53				62.53	
11	Frank Casañas	Spain	x	62.15	x				62.15	
	Erik Cadée	Netherlands	x	x	x				NM	
