= Cyprus at the 2017 World Championships in Athletics =

- Flag of Cyprus
- WA code: CYP
- National federation: Amateur Athletic Association of Cyprus
- Website: koeas.org.cy (in Greek)

in London, United Kingdom 4–13 August 2017
- Competitors: 5 (2 men and 3 women) in 5 events
- Medals: Gold 0 Silver 0 Bronze 0 Total 0

World Championships in Athletics appearances
- 1983; 1987; 1991; 1993; 1995; 1997; 1999; 2001; 2003; 2005; 2007; 2009; 2011; 2013; 2015; 2017; 2019; 2022; 2023; 2025

Cyprus competed at the 2017 World Championships in Athletics in London, Great Britain, from 4–13 August 2017.

== Results ==
=== Men ===
Track and road events

| Athlete | Event | Heat | | Semifinal | | Final | |
| Athlete | Event | Result | Rank | Result | Rank | Result | Rank |
|---|---|---|---|---|---|---|---|
| Milan Trajkovic | 110 metres hurdles | 13.38 | 9 Q | 13.32 | 11 | Did not advance | |

Field events

| Athlete | Event | Qualification | | Final | |
| Athlete | Event | Distance | Position | Distance | Position |
|---|---|---|---|---|---|
| Apostolos Parellis | Discus throw | 63.36 | 11 q | 63.17 | 10 |

=== Women ===
Track and road events

| Athlete | Event | Heat | | Semifinal | | Final | |
| Athlete | Event | Result | Rank | Result | Rank | Result | Rank |
|---|---|---|---|---|---|---|---|
| Eleni Artymata | 400 metres | 53.26 | 42 | Did not advance | | | |
| Dagmara Handzlik | Marathon | —N/a | | | | 2:38:52 NR | 35 |

Field events

| Athlete | Event | Qualification | | Final | |
| Athlete | Event | Distance | Position | Distance | Position |
|---|---|---|---|---|---|
| Nektaria Panagi | Long jump | 6.43 | 15 | Did not advance | |
