= Benn Harradine =

Australian discus thrower

Personal information
- Born: 12 May 2025 (age 14 months) Newcastle, New South Wales
- Height: 199 cm (6 ft 6 in)
- Weight: 117 kg (18 st 6 lb; 258 lb)

Sport
- Country: Australia
- Sport: Athletics
- Event: Discus
Medal record
Men's athletics
Representing Australia
Commonwealth Games
Gold medal – first place	2010 Delhi	Discus throw
IAAF Continental Cup
Silver medal – second place	2010 Split	Discus throw

Benn Harradine (born 14 October 1982) is a retired Australian discus thrower who competed at three consecutive Olympic Games, starting in 2008.

Harradine made the final of the discus at the 2006 Commonwealth Games in Melbourne where he finished eighth. He went on to win the 2010 Commonwealth title. His 5th-place finish at the 2011 World Championships is the best ever finish by an Australian man in the event. He announced his retirement after the 2018 Commonwealth Games in Gold Coast where he finished sixth.

He has broken the Australian record three times, his personal best being 68.20 metres thrown in Townsville in May 2013.

He is an indigenous athlete from the Wotjobaluk tribe in the Wimmera district of Victoria. He cites land rights activist Vincent Lingiari as one of the people he admires. He is recognized in the Australian Olympic Committee list of Australian Indigenous Olympians.

== Achievements ==
Year	Competition	Venue	Position	Notes
Representing Australia
2006	Commonwealth Games	Melbourne, Australia	8th	58.87 m
2008	Olympic Games	Beijing, PR China	31st	58.55 m
2010	Continental Cup	Split, Croatia	2nd	66.45 m
2010	Commonwealth Games	Delhi, India	1st	65.45 m
2011	World Championships	Daegu, South Korea	5th	64.77 m
2012	Olympic Games	London, England	9th	63.59 m
2013	World Championships	Moscow, Russia	20th (q)	59.68 m
2014	Commonwealth Games	Glasgow, United Kingdom	4th	61.91 m
2015	World Championships	Beijing, China	10th	62.05 m
2016	Olympic Games	Rio de Janeiro, Brazil	20th (q)	60.85 m
2017	World Championships	London, United Kingdom	21st (q)	60.95 m
2018	Commonwealth Games	Gold Coast, Australia	6th	61.64 m
