= Cyprus at the 2015 World Championships in Athletics =

- WA code: CYP

in Beijing
- Competitors: 3
- Medals: Gold 0 Silver 0 Bronze 0 Total 0

World Championships in Athletics appearances
- 1983; 1987; 1991; 1993; 1995; 1997; 1999; 2001; 2003; 2005; 2007; 2009; 2011; 2013; 2015; 2017; 2019; 2022; 2023; 2025

Cyprus competed at the 2015 World Championships in Athletics in Beijing, China, from 22–30 August 2015.

== Results ==
(q – qualified, NM – no mark, SB – season best)

=== Men ===
Field events

Athlete	Event	Qualification		Final	
Athlete	Event	Distance	Position	Distance	Position
Dimitrios Chondrokoukis	High jump	2.31	7 Q	2.25	11
Apostolos Parellis	Discus throw	64.41m	4 Q	64.55	6

=== Women ===
Track and road events

Athlete	Event	Heat		Semifinal		Final	
Athlete	Event	Result	Rank	Result	Rank	Result	Rank
Ramona Papaioannou	100 metres	11.29w	23 Q	11.38	24	did not advance	
Ramona Papaioannou	200 metres	23.30	34	did not advance		did not advance	
