= Markus Münch (discus thrower) =

German discus thrower

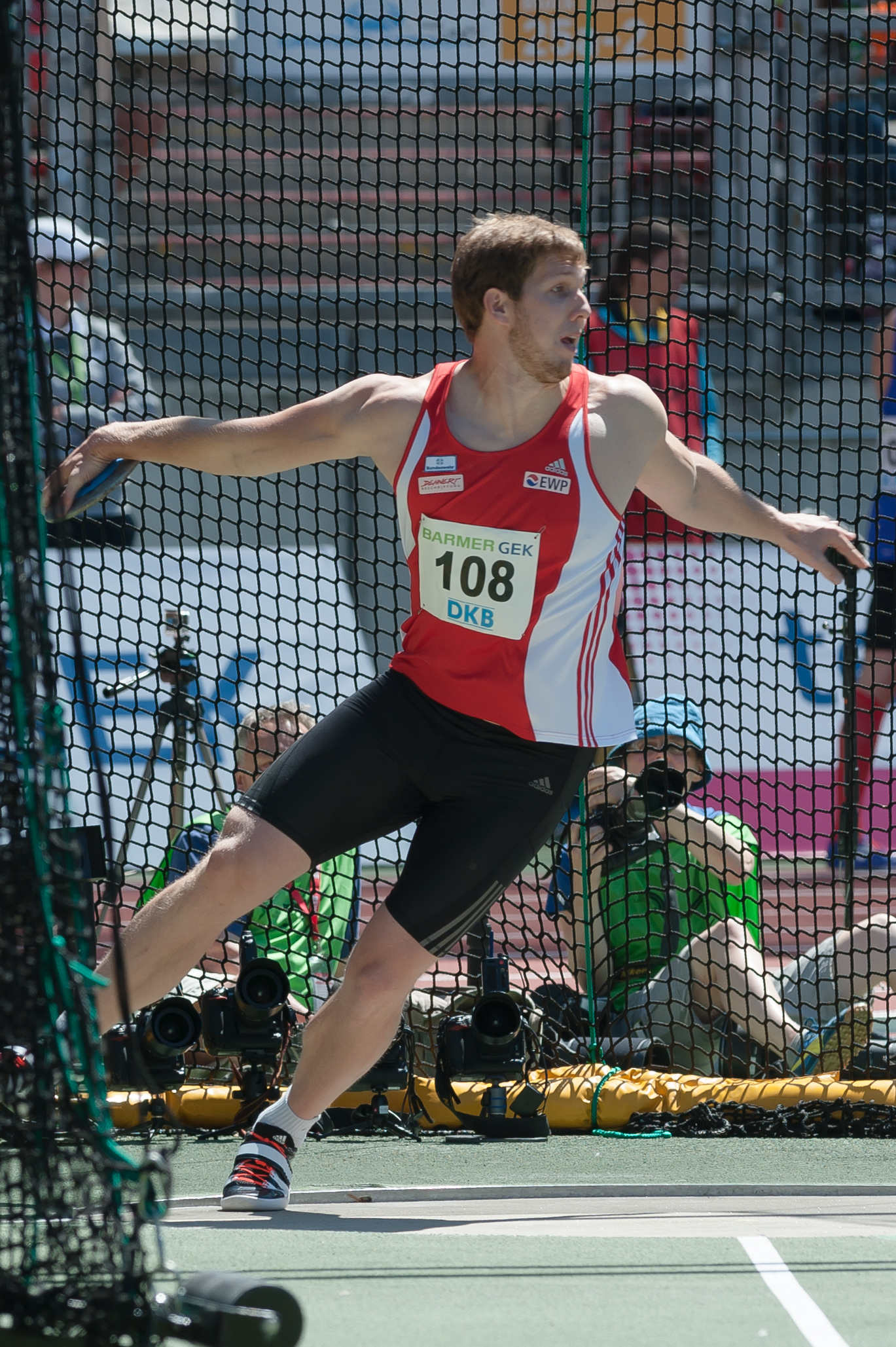
- Münch in 2015

Personal information
- Born: 13 June 1986 (age 39)
- Height: 2.07 m (6 ft 9 1/2 in)
- Weight: 130 kg (287 lb)

Sport
- Country: Germany
- Sport: Athletics
- Event: Discus
- Club: LG Wedel-Pinneberg (to 2012); SC Potsdam (from 2013)
- Updated on 12 August 2012

Markus Münch (born 13 June 1986) is a retired German athlete. He competed for Germany in discus at the 2012 Summer Olympics.

He announced his retirement in December 2017.

== Competition record ==
Year	Competition	Venue	Position	Event	Notes
Representing Germany
2007	European U23 Championships	Debrecen, Hungary	13th (q)	Discus throw	53.52 m
2009	European Cup Winter Throwing	Los Realejos, Spain	2nd	Discus throw	64.90 m
2009	Universiade	Belgrade, Serbia	3rd	Discus throw	63.76 m
2009	World Championships	Berlin, Germany	20th (q)	Discus throw	60.55 m
2010	European Cup Winter Throwing	Arles, France	1st	Discus throw	65.37 m
2010	European Championships	Barcelona, Spain	24th (q)	Discus throw	58.81 m
2011	World Championships	Daegu, South Korea	26th (q)	Discus throw	60.80 m
2012	European Championships	Helsinki, Finland	8th	Discus throw	61.25 m
2012	Olympic Games	London, United Kingdom	30th (q)	Discus throw	59.95 m
2015	Military World Games	Mungyeong, South Korea	6th	Discus throw	59.55 m
