= Martin Marić =

Croatian discus thrower

Personal information
- Born: April 19, 1984 (age 42)
- Height: 1.97 m (6 ft 6 in)
- Weight: 120 kg (265 lb)

Sport
- Country: Croatia
- Sport: Athletics
- Event: Discus
Medal record
Men's athletics
Representing Croatia
Mediterranean Games
Gold medal – first place	Mersin 2013	Discus throw

Martin Marić (born 19 April 1984) is a Croatian track and field athlete who competes in the discus throw. He has a personal best of 67.92 m (222 ft 10 in), achieved in April 2014 in Chula Vista, California. He also has 72.31 m (237 ft 2 3/4 in) in the javelin throw, achieved in May 2006. He has been a throws coach at the University of Virginia since 2012. Maric spent the springs of 2010 and 2011 as a volunteer assistant coach at the University of Florida.

== Doping ==
In August 2015, the World Anti-Doping Agency published a "Prohibited Association list".

Marić tested positive for ostarine, an SARM, in July 2014. He was given a two-year ban from track and field athletics through 5 August 2016. His ban lasted through 2016.

== Professional ==
Marić represented Croatia at the 2013 World Championships in Athletics – Men's discus throw in Moscow, Russia. He placed 27th at the 2011 World Championships in Athletics – Men's discus throw in 60.61 meters.

He represented Croatia at the 2012 Olympic Games. He placed 17th with 62.87 meters.

He represented Croatia at the 2011 World Championships in Athletics – Men's discus throw in Daegu, South Korea. He placed 27th at the 2011 World Championships in Athletics – Men's discus throw in 60.61 meters.

Marić represented Croatia at the Athletics at the 2009 Summer Universiade also called 2009 World University Games. He placed 7th at the Athletics at the 2009 Summer Universiade – Men's discus throw in 58.37 meters.

He also competed at the 2008 Olympic Games, but without reaching the final, placing 29th with a 59.25 meters.

He represented Croatia at the 2007 Summer Universiade – Men's discus throw. He placed 8th at the 2007 Summer Universiade – Men's discus throw in 56.32 meters.

Marić finished thirteenth at the 2001 World Youth Championships and won the silver medal at the 2003 European Junior Championships.

== NCAA ==
As a competitor for the University of Georgia, Marić attained 2006 All-American status in the discus by placing 6th at the NCAA Men's Division I Outdoor Track and Field Championships. In the javelin, Maric registered a throw of 237–3 feet, which improves his own seventh-longest mark in Georgia Bulldogs and Lady Bulldogs history.

After transferring to the University of California, he attained All-American Status in the discus by placing 8th at the National Collegiate Athletic Association championships. In his senior campaign, Marić won the NCAA Division I national collegiate championships by throwing the discus 196–3, beating Ryan Whiting of Arizona State Sun Devils by only 2 cm (1 in) on his final throw.

He graduated from California with a bachelor's degree in Political Economy of Industrial Societies in 2009.

== Personal ==
Marić was born in Belgrade and is a native of Split, Croatia.

== Competition record ==
Year	Competition	Venue	Position	Event	Notes
Representing Croatia
2001	World Youth Championships	Debrecen, Hungary	13th	Discus throw (1.5 kg)	49.12 m
2003	European Junior Championships	Tampere, Finland	2nd	Discus throw (1.75 kg)	58.59 m
2005	Mediterranean Games	Almería, Spain	9th	Discus throw	53.35 m
2005	European U23 Championships	Erfurt, Germany	13th (q)	Discus throw	52.34 m
2007	Universiade	Bangkok, Thailand	8th	Discus throw	56.32 m
2007	Universiade	Bangkok, Thailand	15th (q)	Javelin throw	65.15 m
2008	Olympic Games	Beijing, China	29th (q)	Discus throw	59.25 m
2009	Mediterranean Games	Pescara, Italy	6th	Discus throw	60.60 m
2009	Universiade	Belgrade, Serbia	7th	Discus throw	58.37 m
2010	European Championships	Barcelona, Spain	10th	Discus throw	62.53 m
2011	World Championships	Daegu, South Korea	27th (q)	Discus throw	60.61 m
2012	Olympic Games	London, United Kingdom	17th (q)	Discus throw	62.87 m
2013	Mediterranean Games	Mersin, Turkey	1st	Discus throw	61.46 m
2013	World Championships	Moscow, Russia	15th (q)	Discus throw	61.98 m
