= Yunio Lastre =

Cuban discus thrower

Personal information
- Full name: Yunio Lastre Hechavarría
- Born: October 26, 1981 (age 44) Santiago de Cuba, Cuba
- Height: 1.89 m (6 ft 2 in)
- Weight: 109 kg (240 lb)

Sport
- Country: Cuba
- Sport: Athletics
- Event: Discus
Medal record
Representing Cuba
Central American and Caribbean Games
Gold medal – first place	2006 Cartagena	Discus throw
- Updated on 1 June 2013

Yunio Lastre Hechevarría (or Yunior Lastre Hechavarría; born 26 October 1981) is a Cuban discus thrower. His personal best throw is 63.67 metres, achieved in March 2009 in Havana.

== Career ==
He won the gold medal at the 2005 Central American and Caribbean Championships and at the 2006 Central American and Caribbean Games.

== Personal best ==
- Shot put: 17.60 m – Havana, Cuba, 17 February 2012
- Discus throw: 65.17 m – Havana, Cuba, 29 June 2012

== Achievements ==
Year	Competition	Venue	Position	Event	Notes
Representing Cuba
2005	ALBA Games	Havana, Cuba	2nd	Discus throw	60.28 m
2005	Central American and Caribbean Championships	Nassau, Bahamas	1st	Discus throw	60.10 m
2006	Central American and Caribbean Games	Cartagena, Colombia	1st	Discus throw	57.00 m
2007	ALBA Games	Caracas, Venezuela	2nd	Discus throw	56.31 m
2007	Pan American Games	Rio de Janeiro, Brazil	5th	Discus throw	54.80 m
2008	Central American and Caribbean Championships	Cali, Colombia	2nd	Discus throw	58.00 m A
2009	ALBA Games	Havana, Cuba	2nd	Discus throw	60.06 m
2009	Central American and Caribbean Championships	Havana, Cuba	2nd	Discus throw	59.80 m
2011	ALBA Games	Barquisimeto, Venezuela	1st	Discus throw	60.97 m
2011	Pan American Games	Guadalajara, Mexico	4th	Discus throw	61.07 m A
2012	Olympic Games	London, United Kingdom	40th (q)	Discus throw	57.33 m
