= Athletics at the 2007 Pan American Games – Men's discus throw =

Men's discus throw at the Pan American Games

The men's discus throw event at the 2007 Pan American Games was held on July 28.

== Results ==
Rank	Athlete	Nationality	#1	#2	#3	#4	#5	#6	Result	Notes
1st place, gold medalist(s)	Michael Robertson	United States	59.24	x	57.84	–	–	58.00	59.24	
2nd place, silver medalist(s)	Adam Kuehl	United States	x	53.43	57.50	x	x	x	57.50	
3rd place, bronze medalist(s)	Dariusz Slowik	Canada	57.37	56.71	x	x	x	56.31	57.37	
4	Germán Lauro	Argentina	x	x	50.58	56.08	53.66	55.83	56.08	
5	Yunio Lastre	Cuba	53.76	54.80	x	x	x	x	54.80	
6	Ronald Julião	Brazil	53.54	x	x	54.36	53.06	53.75	54.36	
7	Adonson Shallow	Saint Vincent and the Grenadines	50.61	x	x	x	51.01	54.03	54.03	
8	Julián Angulo	Colombia	x	x	50.79	x	x	x	50.79	
9	Hickel Woolery	Jamaica	50.51	x	47.89				50.51	
10	Jason Morgan	Jamaica	x	x	50.09				50.09	
11	Alessandro Costa	Brazil	x	39.15	46.08				46.08	
