= Cyprus at the 2023 World Athletics Championships =

- Flag of Cyprus
- WA code: CYP

in Budapest, Hungary 19 August 2023 – 27 August 2023
- Competitors: 6 (3 men and 3 women)
- Medals: Gold 0 Silver 0 Bronze 0 Total 0

World Athletics Championships appearances
- 1983; 1987; 1991; 1993; 1995; 1997; 1999; 2001; 2003; 2005; 2007; 2009; 2011; 2013; 2015; 2017; 2019; 2022; 2023

Cyprus competed at the 2023 World Athletics Championships in Budapest, Hungary, from 19 to 27 August 2023.

== Results ==
Cyprus entered 6 athletes.

Key

- Q = Qualified for the next round
- q = Qualified for the next round as a fastest loser or, in field events, by position without achieving the qualifying target
- NR = National record
- PB = Personal best
- SB = Season best
- N/A = Round not applicable for the event

=== Men ===
Track and road events

| Athlete | Event | Heat | | Semifinal | | Final | |
| Athlete | Event | Result | Rank | Result | Rank | Result | Rank |
|---|---|---|---|---|---|---|---|
| Milan Trajkovic | 110 metres hurdles | 13.33 | 2 Q | 13.33 | 5 | Did not advance | |

Field events

| Athlete | Event | Qualification | | Final | |
| Athlete | Event | Distance | Position | Distance | Position |
|---|---|---|---|---|---|
| Apostolos Parellis | Discus throw | 62.10 SB | 24 | Did not advance | |
| Alexandros Poursanidis | Hammer throw | 71.63 | 27 | Did not advance | |

=== Women ===
Track and road events

| Athlete | Event | Heat | | Semifinal | | Final | |
| Athlete | Event | Result | Rank | Result | Rank | Result | Rank |
|---|---|---|---|---|---|---|---|
| Olivia Fotopoulou | 100 metres | 11.38 | 5 | Did not advance | | | |
| Olivia Fotopoulou | 200 metres | 22.65 PB | 3 Q | 22.73 | 5 | Did not advance | |
| Natalia Christofi | 100 metres hurdles | 12.90 | 4 Q | 13.15 | 8 | Did not advance | |

Field events

| Athlete | Event | Qualification | | Final | |
| Athlete | Event | Distance | Position | Distance | Position |
|---|---|---|---|---|---|
| Elena Kulichenko | High jump | 1.92 =PB | 8 q | 1.90 | =13 |
