= Jason Young (discus thrower) =

American discus thrower

Personal information
- Nationality: American
- Born: May 27, 1981 (age 45)
- Agent: Valentina Fedjuschina
- Height: 6 ft 1 in (1.85 m)
- Weight: 260 lb (120 kg)

Sport
- Sport: Track and Field
- Event: Discus Throw
- College team: Texas Tech

Achievements and titles
- Personal best: Discus Throw: 69.90m

Jason Young (born May 27, 1981) is an American discus thrower who competed in the 2012 Summer Olympics, finishing 19th. At Texas Tech, Young was a two-time All-American in track and field and placed second in the discus at the 2004 NCAA Outdoor Championship. In 2010 and 2011, he was the runner-up in discus at the USA Outdoor Track and Field Championships. He finished 2010 as the number two ranked discus thrower in the world, and has been ranked among the top ten in the United States six times.

== Early life ==
Jason Young was born May 27, 1981. He first started throwing the discus in high school and was quickly hooked; by age 17, he knew he wanted to compete the event at the Olympics. He graduated from Samuell High School in Dallas, Texas in 1999. In 1999, he won the discus throw at the USATF Junior Olympics with a distance of 56.74 metres (186.2 ft).

== Athletic career ==
After high school, Young attended Texas Tech University where he was a two-time All-American in track and field. In 2002, he won the discus at the NACAC Under-25 Championships with a distance of 55.74 metres (182.9 ft). In 2003, he placed fourth in the discus at the NCAA Outdoor Championships. The next year, he improved to second place, turning in a throw of 60.24 metres (197.6 ft). By the time he graduated in 2004, Young had set three school records – the indoor weight throw, the outdoor discus, and the hammer throw. As of 2012, all three records still stand. He also qualified for the Olympic Trials where he placed ninth in the discus.

In 2006, Young finished the year ranked number two in the country at the discus and number six in the world. He took 2007 off, and finished 2008 ranked number two and number 15. He returned to top form in 2010, turning in his personal best throw to date with a distance of 69.90 metres (229.3 ft) and finished the year as the top ranked thrower in the US and number two in the world. As of 2012, Young has now been ranked in the top 10 nationally at the discus six times.

At the 2008 Olympic Trials, Young placed 9th in the discus. In 2010, Young was the runner-up in discus at the USA Outdoor Track and Field Championships with a throw of 61.15 metres (200.6 ft). In 2011, he lost his job and "almost quit" competing. He pressed on and finished second in the US Championships, with a distance of 63.81 metres (209.4 ft). He moved on to the 2011 World Championships where he placed 10th with a distance of 63.20 metres (207.3 ft).

At the 2012 Olympic Trials, Young threw the discus 61.50 metres (201.8 ft) in the first round to take an early lead. From there, he steadily improved throwing 61.83 metres (202.9 ft) in the second round, 62.07 metres (203.6 ft) in the fourth and 62.14 metres (203.9 ft) in the sixth and final round. He placed third and made the 2012 United States Olympic Team. As it turned out, his first round throw would have also been good enough for the third and final qualifying spot. "It’s been a really long road to try to get here," he remarked. "More than anything else, I’m relieved that I’m finally on the team."

In the qualifying round of the discus at the 2012 Olympics, Young recorded a distance of 62.18 metres (204.0 ft) on his first throw placing him eighth at the time. His next two attempts were fouls while several other competitors improved their marks. As a result, Young fell to 18th place and did not advance out of the qualifying round. He did, however, finish ahead of the other two American competitors.

Young is self-coached and is sponsored by Nike.

== Personal life ==
After college, Young worked as a strength and conditioning coach for Texas Tech. He currently lives in Lubbock, Texas, where he works as a personal trainer. He is married to former Texas Tech teammate Megan Young, and has a one-year-old son, Omo. In order to raise money to get his family to London for the 2012 Olympics, Young conducted several fundraising events. Being a track and field competitor is "extremely difficult," he explained. "Very few people can make a full-time living at track and field".
