= Julian Wruck =

Australian discus thrower (born 1991)

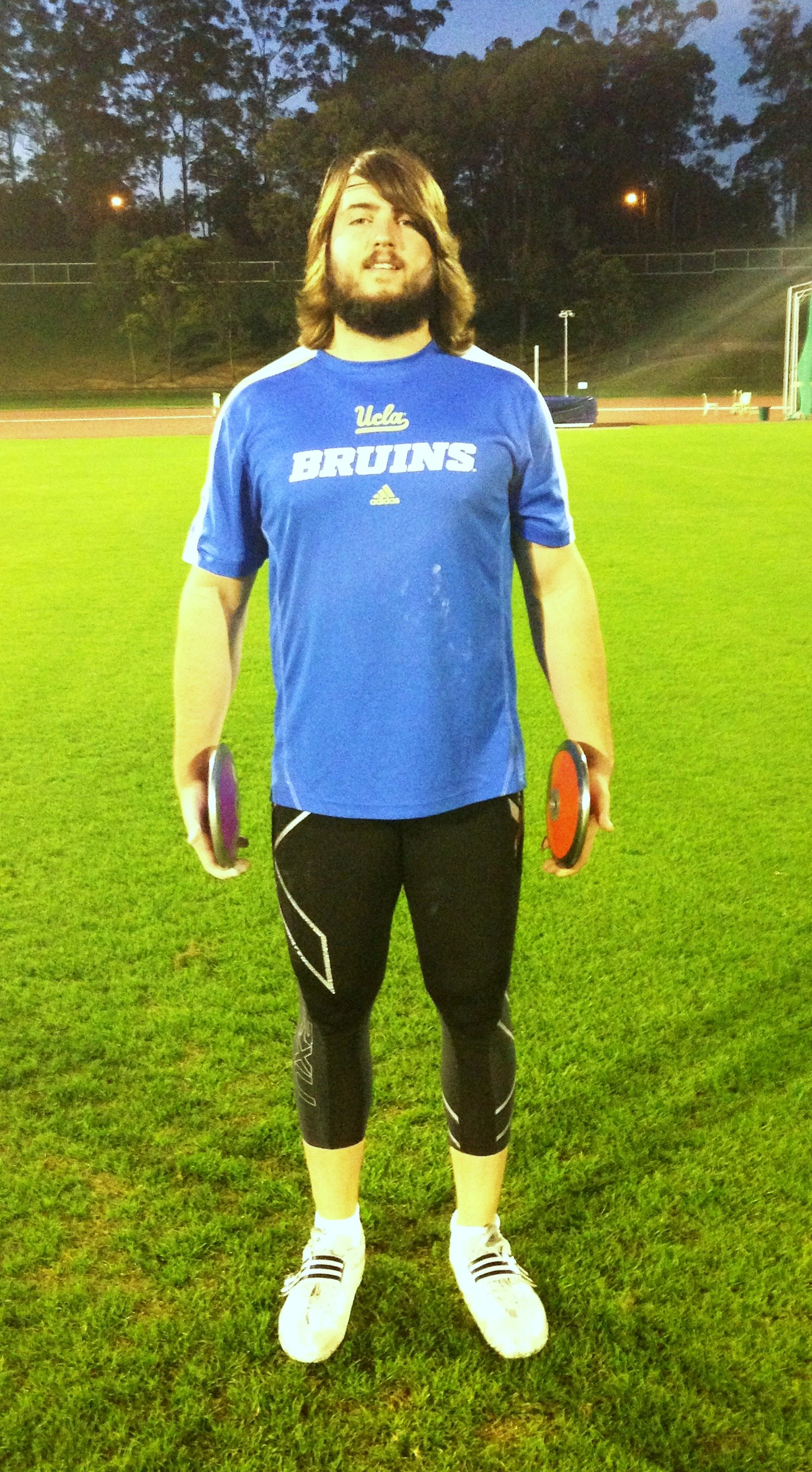
Julian Wruck

Julian Edward Wruck (born 6 July 1991) is an Australian discus thrower and Olympic athlete. His personal best to date is 68.16m which places him as the Number 2 athlete on the All Time List of Australian discus throwers.

== Biography ==
Wruck was born in Brisbane, Queensland, on 6 July 1991, to Paul Anthony Wruck, a former high school teacher, and Mary Lou Watkins, a current high school teachers. He attended Our Lady of the Rosary Primary school from preschool to Year 3, followed by Nudgee Junior College until Year 7. In 2004, Wruck began his five years of high school at St Joseph's College, Gregory Terrace. Always passionate about sport, Wruck represented his school in rugby, basketball, rowing, and athletics. He attended the Kenmore Little Athletics Club from the age of seven and broke numerous junior shot put records. A shattered tibia during a school basketball game at 15 years of age steered Wruck permanently away from team sports and into the individual athletic throwing events of discus and shot put. He attended Texas Tech University in Lubbock Texas for two years (mid 2009 – mid 2011). He graduated from UCLA on a sporting scholarship and completed a degree in Philosophy while training and throwing in the Pac-12 Conference (Pac-12) and NCAA Championships.

== Achievements ==
Wruck first realized his potential as a discus thrower at the age of 15 when he won the 2007 Australian National All Schools Track and Field Championships with a throw of 58.40m. The following year he was selected to compete in the Commonwealth Youth Games in Pune India where he beat second place-getter England by more than five metres and set a new Australian and Commonwealth Youth record (1.75 kg) with a throw of 60.88m. He concluded 2008 by winning the Pacific Schools Games 17 Years Discus by throwing the 1.5 kg discus 60.43m. This was his launching pad for a U.S. Collegiate scholarship to Texas Tech where the Chancellor, Sen. Robert Duncan, of the university remarked upon his small stature.

In 2010, Wruck won bronze at the IAAF World Junior Championships in Moncton, Canada. He was then selected to compete in the Commonwealth Games in Delhi and made the finals despite being Australia's youngest male Athletics competitor at 19 years and 89 days. He also claimed the Australian U20 Discus record.

In his 2011 sophomore year, Wruck won the prestigious NCAA Division I Men's Discus title with a throw of 61.81m. At a meet in Geelong in December 2011, Wruck threw a personal best of 65.78m, 2.3 metres further than his previous PB, which was also a new Queensland record and an Olympic A qualifier. It was at that time the furthest distance thrown by an Australian male discus thrower on Australian soil.

Returning to Melbourne for the Olympic selection trials in March 2012, Wruck threw 61.54m in difficult conditions to win the competition, defeating reigning champion Benn Harradine (60.51m), and securing his place on the Australian Olympic team to compete in London that year.

Of the 41 competitors in the Men's Discus at the Olympics, Wruck was third youngest at just 21 years of age. His preparation for the games was greatly hampered by a serious bout of Glandular Fever (Infectious Mononucleosis) which stripped 30 kg from his frame and left him severely weakened. He finished 28th overall.

Wruck's most successful year came in 2013, where in the US College Division 1 system he claimed John Godina’s UCLA and Pac-12 Records, and Hannes Hopley’s all time NCAA record. A big highlight was "...his performance at the exhibition Claremont Throws meet the week prior, where he uncorked the best throw ever by a collegian with a 223-7 (68.16m) mark, and won his second NCAA discus title. He finished the season not only undefeated but nearly untouchable in eight collegiate events in 2013, registering the top 27 throws by any collegian in 2013." Finally, after being nominated for the Bowerman Award for the best male Track and Field Athlete of the Year in the US Collegiate system, Wruck was selected as a finalist (final 3) and was voted number one in the Bowerman Fan Vote.

In Australia, he claimed his first Open Australian Discus Title with a World Championship A Qualifying distance over 66m, gaining an automatic qualification to the World Athletics Championships in Moscow. At the 2013 IAAF World Athletics Championships Wruck finished in 11th position. In 2013, Julian Wruck ranked 4th on the IAAF world list of Men's Discus Throwers. He competed at the 2014 Commonwealth Games.

Julian Edward Wruck's personal best is 68.16 m (223 ft 7 in) which places him as the Number 2 athlete on the All Time List of Australian discus throwers (as of 2015).
