= Cyprus at the 2009 World Championships in Athletics =

- WA code: CYP

in Berlin
- Competitors: 4 (1 man, 3 women)
- Medals: Gold 0 Silver 1 Bronze 0 Total 1

World Championships in Athletics appearances
- 1983; 1987; 1991; 1993; 1995; 1997; 1999; 2001; 2003; 2005; 2007; 2009; 2011; 2013; 2015; 2017; 2019; 2022; 2023

Cyprus competed at the 2009 World Championships in Athletics from 15 to 23 August in Berlin in Germany.

== Team selection ==
Track and road events

Event	Athletes	
Event	Men	Women
100 metres		Eleni Artymata
200 metres		Eleni Artymata

Field and combined events

Event	Athletes	
Event	Men	Women
High jump	Kyriakos Ioannou	
Pole vault		Mariánna Zaharíadi
Hammer throw		Pareskevi Theodorou

== Results ==
=== Men ===
Field and combined events

Event	Athletes	Qualification		Final	
Event	Athletes	Result	Rank	Result	Rank
High jump	Kyriakos Ioannou	2.30 SB	1	2.32 SB	Silver medal

=== Women ===
Track and road events

Event	Athletes	Heats		Quarterfinal		Semifinal		Final	
Event	Athletes	Result	Rank	Result	Rank	Result	Rank	Result	Rank
100 m	Eleni Artymata	11.47	19	11.37 PB	14	11.49	15	did not advance	
200 m	Eleni Artymata	22.83 NR	5	-		22.64 NR	8	23.05	8

Field and combined events

Event	Athletes	Qualification		Final	
Event	Athletes	Result	Rank	Result	Rank
Pole vault	Mariánna Zaharíadi	4.25	24	did not advance	
Hammer throw	Pareskevi Theodorou	NM	-	did not advance	
