= Apostolos Parellis =

Cypriot discus thrower

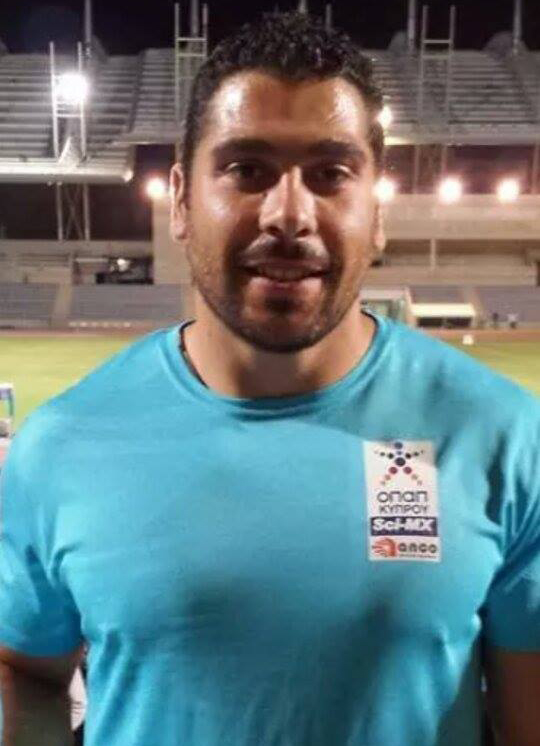
- Cypriot discus thrower Apostolos Parellis (2014)

Personal information
- Born: 24 July 1985 (age 40) Paliometocho, Cyprus
- Height: 1.85 m (6 ft 1 in)
- Weight: 112 kg (247 lb) (2022)

Sport
- Country: Cyprus
- Sport: Track and field
- Event: Discus throw
- Club: GSP
- Coached by: Kwstantinos Stathelakos

Achievements and titles
- Personal best: 66.32 m NR
Medal record
Men's athletics
Representing Cyprus
Commonwealth Games
Silver medal – second place	2014 Glasgow	Discus throw
Bronze medal – third place	2018 Gold Coast	Discus throw
European Athletics U23 Championships
Bronze medal – third place	2007 Debrecen	Discus throw
Games of the Small States of Europe
Gold medal – first place	2009 Cyprus	Discus throw
Gold medal – first place	2011 Liechtenstein	Discus throw
Silver medal – second place	2013 Luxembourg	Discus throw
European Team Championships
Gold medal – first place	2008 Second League	Discus throw
Gold medal – first place	2010 Third League	Discus throw
Gold medal – first place	2011 Third League	Discus throw
Gold medal – first place	2013 Second League	Discus throw
Silver medal – second place	2009 Second League	Discus throw
Silver medal – second place	2014 Third League	Discus throw
Bronze medal – third place	2015 Second League	Discus throw
- Updated on 24 June 2015

Apostolos Parellis (Greek: Απόστολος Παρέλλης, born 24 July 1985) is a Cypriot track and field athlete specializing in discus throw. He is the current Cypriot national record holder with 66.32 m (217 ft 7 in) since October 2019.

Parellis competed at the 2012 Summer Olympics in London narrowly missing a spot in the final after finishing 13th overall with an attempt of 63.48m., just seven centimetres shy of the 12th position that gave the ticket to the final. In the 2015 Athletics World Championships in Beijing, Apostolos clinched 6th spot in the world with a 64.55m. throw.

Since breaking the National Record in 2007 for the first time (57.81m.) at the age of 22, Parellis has been the islands top discus thrower, improving his personal best another eleven times. The 66.32m. mark was set in October 2019 at world championships Doha, Qatar.

== Early life ==
Apostolos Parellis grew up at the village of Paliometocho at the west of the capital Nicosia. He attended the Anthoupoli Junior High and then the Technical School from which he graduated with a mark of 17,6/20. Parellis then went on to study Mechanical Engineering at the Frederick University and acquired the Bachelor of Mechanical Engineering in 2012 with a GPA of 3.87/4.
Coming from a sporting family, as a youngster Apostolos watched his father Lakis win many national titles at Rally driving and especially in the 2WD category. Racing is a family tradition that Demetris Parellis, Apostolos’ brother, continues today. Apostolos and Demetris also have a younger sister.

== Career year by year ==
Apostolos Parellis’ first major sporting success came in 2002 at the age of 17, when he took 4th position in the discus event at the 2002 Gymnasiade at Caen, France.

=== 2007 ===
On 28 March, Parellis set his first National Record by achieving a throw of 57.81m. at the Diagoreia meeting at GSP stadium. He broke Petros Mitsides’ record of 56.39m. that stood since 2004. The new NR came while competing against the previous holder Mitsides who during that meeting also broke his personal best.

On 14 July the Cypriot discus athlete won bronze at the European Athletics U23 Championships that was held in Debrecen, Hungary, setting his second NR with a throw of 58.16m.

=== 2008 ===
Despite not setting a new NR during the season, 2008 was a successful year for Parellis. By winning gold in the European Team Championships Second League, he helped Cyprus achieve promotion, while he also won first position in the Pancyprian Games.

=== 2009 ===
Four new National Records were set during 2009 by Parellis:

- In May at the Matseia meeting he threw 59.05m.
- In June, Apostolos won his first medal at the Games of the Small States of Europe that were hosted in his native Cyprus. By throwing 60.55m., he won gold and set a new Games Record along with his fourth NR.
- At the end of June during the European Team Championships he set a new record 60.94m. on the road to winning silver.
- The fourth and final National Record of the year came at the Summer Universiade at Belgrade, Serbia, when Parellis overcame the 61 metre mark (61.07m.) for the first time.

During the season, Parellis also competed at the 2009 Mediterranean Games in Pescara, Italy and took 7th position with 60.12m.

=== 2010 ===
Apostolos reached the 62 metres mark during the season.

In April during the Cyprus University Championships, Parellis again broke the National Record with a throw at 61.82m., while two months later he set a new record during a meeting with 61.92m. Parellis’ good run continued at the European Athletics Championships in Barcelona, Spain where he took 17th position overall (60.57m.) on 31 July. The season ended in October at the Commonwealth Games at Delhi, India, where Apostolos narrowly missed the podium, by finishing 4th. With a throw of 60.51m., the Cypriot finished just 13 centimetres away from the bronze.

=== 2011 ===
The year opened at the Games of the Small States of Europe at Liechtenstein in June, with Parellis having the honour of being Cyprus’ flag bearer during the opening ceremony. He went on to win gold with 59.73m. In September, Parellis competed at the Summer Universiade in Shenzhen, China, and with a throw of 61.44 he took 6th position overall.

=== 2012 ===
Two years after his last NR, Parellis once again improved his personal best in March, when he passed the 62 metres mark for the first time (62.49m.) at a throwing meeting at GSP stadium.

On 2 June Parellis broke the national record with a throw of 63.63m. at Heraklion, Crete, Greece while the following day at Chania, Crete, Apostolos again broke the NR, this time by thrashing the national record with a throw of 65.36m. In August, Parellis competed at the 2012 Summer Olympics in London. With a throw at 63.48m. the Cypriot finished in 13th position overall, just one spot and seven centimetres away from the final. By finishing 13th in the discus event, Parellis currently has the highest placing (tied with high jump athlete Kyriakos Ioannou) by an athlete representing Cyprus in the Olympic Games track and field events.

=== 2013 ===
Following a difficult Olympic season, Parellis was unable to reach the same high standards during 2013. But despite not coming close to his personal best, Apostolos qualified for the 2013 Athletics World Championships in Moscow, Russia, in August and took 19th position with 59.84m. Earlier, in June Parellis won silver at the Games of the Small States of Europe in Luxembourg with a throw at 59.11m. and seventh position (59.40m.) at the 2013 Mediterranean Games in Mersin, Turkey.

=== 2014 ===
The season started strong for Parellis, who returned to his big throws. In March at the European Winter Throwing Cup in Leiria, Portugal, he took 6th position with 61.44m.

In May at the Matseia meeting at GSP stadium, Apostolos achieved his second best throw of his career by recording a mark of 63.89m. A few days later, on 7 June, during the Pancyprian Games, Parellis won gold with a throw of 63.71m., the third best of his career. A third position (62.20m.) at the Memorial Josef Odlozila meeting in Prague, Czech Republic and a silver medal (61.80m.) at the 2014 European Cup Third League at Tbilisi, Georgia featured more good throws in the buildup for the Commonwealth Games in Scotland and the European Championships in Switzerland. In Glasgow, Scotland, on 31 August, Apostolos won the silver medal at the Commonwealth Games with a throw of 63.32m, while a few days later with a best throw of 60.32m. the Cypriot athlete took 16th overall position in the 2014 European Championships in Zurich.

=== 2015 ===
After a 40-day training camp in South Africa and a two-week preparation period in the town of Monte Gordo, Portugal, Apostolos kicked off the season in the 2015 European Winter Throwing Cup in Leiria, Portugal. Speaking to the Press before the event, Parellis set his target at 60 meters, since it was his first competitive event of the year, but eventually managed to throw 65.04m., which gave him the 4th place in the competition and most importantly, a spot in the 2015 World Championships in Beijing. The 65.04m. is Parellis' second best throw in his career.

Following his strong start to the season, Apostolos was invited for the first time in his career to compete at an IAAF Diamond League meet. On 17 May, the Cypriot thrower took part in the Shanghai Golden Grand Prix in China, where he took 7th spot with a best attempt of 61.77m.

A few days later, on 23 May, Parellis competed at the Dakar IAAF Grand Prix in Senegal, of the IAAF World Challenge series. He threw a best shot of 61.28m. to take 4th position.

The next appearance by Parellis, in the buildup for the 2015 World Championships, came at the 2015 European Team Championships, second league, held at Stara Zagora, Bulgaria, on 21 June. With a best throw of 60.27m., Parellis had to settle with third position. Before travelling to China, Parellis competed at his second IAAF Diamond League in his career, in London on 24 July, again taking 7th spot with a best throw of 61.07m. A few days earlier, on 11 July, the Cypriot thrower won first spot at the Madrid IAAF World Challenge with a 60.79m. throw. He also competed at the European Premier Meeting in Luzern on 14 July taking 4th spot.

Next up was the 2015 World Championships in Athletics, for which Parellis travelled to China almost two weeks in advance for better preparation. In the qualification on 27 August, Parellis threw 64.41m., the fourth best of the day, claiming a spot in the final of the discus event. Two days later, Apostolos had a best throw of 64.55m. which was enough to secure him sixth place in the world.

The 2015 season ended for Apostolos with yet another IAAF Diamond League appearance. On 3 September in Zurich, Parellis threw 62.62m. which gave him a 6th-place finishing.

=== 2016 ===
Following a pre-season training camp in South Africa, Parellis made his season debut with a meeting in Athens, Greece, where he threw 62.95m. to claim first spot in the event of 5 March. Twenty days later Parellis had a 64.77m. throw during an Amateur Athletic Association of Cyprus meeting in GSP stadium in Nicosia, just 23 centimeters shy of the Rio 2016 qualification mark.
Parellis spent April at a training camp in Portugal, in preparation for his participation in the IAAF Diamond League series as well as for the European Championships and Olympic Games.

At his first IAAF Diamond League meet, on 22 May 2016 at Rabat, Morocco, Apostolos had a best throw at 63.46m.

A few days later, at the "Heraklion 2016" meeting in the Crete city, Apostolos managed to break his own national record, throwing 65.69m.

== National Record Progression ==
Since 28 March 2007, Apostolos Parellis set in eleven occasions a new National Record in discus.

2007
1. 57.81m. / 28 March / GSP stadium
2. 58.16m. / 14 July / Debrecen, Hungary

2009
3. 59.05m. / 16 May / GSP stadium
4. 60.55m. / 4 June / GSP stadium
5. 60.94m. / 20 June / Bystrica, Slovakia
6. 61.07m. / 12 July / Belgrade, Serbia

2010
7. 61.82m. / 29 April / GSP stadium
8. 61.92m. / 16 July / GSP stadium

2012
9. 62.49m. / 6 March / GSP stadium
10. 63.63m. / 2 June / Heraklion, Crete, Greece
11. 65.36m. / 3 June / Chania, Crete, Greece

2016
12. 65.69m. / 28 May / Heraklion, Crete, Greece

== Competition highlights ==
Year	Competition	Venue	Position	Notes
Representing Cyprus
2007	European U23 Championships	Debrecen, Hungary	3rd	58.16 m
2007	Universiade	Bangkok, Thailand	13th (q)	54.53 m
2009	Games of the Small States of Europe	Nicosia, Cyprus	1st	60.55 m
2009	Mediterranean Games	Pescara, Italy	7th	60.12 m
2009	Universiade	Belgrade, Serbia	6th	61.07 m
2010	European Championships	Barcelona, Spain	17th (q)	60.57 m
2010	Commonwealth Games	Delhi, India	4th	60.51 m
2011	Games of the Small States of Europe	Schaan, Liechtenstein	1st	59.73 m
2011	Universiade	Shenzhen, China	6th	61.44 m
2012	European Championships	Helsinki, Finland	14th (q)	61.79 m
2012	Olympic Games	London, United Kingdom	13th (q)	63.48 m
2013	Games of the Small States of Europe	Luxembourg, Luxembourg	2nd	59.11 m
2013	Mediterranean Games	Mersin, Turkey	7th	59.40 m
2013	World Championships	Moscow, Russia	19th (q)	59.84 m
2014	Commonwealth Games	Glasgow, United Kingdom	2nd	63.32 m
2014	European Championships	Zürich, Switzerland	16th (q)	60.32 m
2015	World Championships	Beijing, China	6th	64.55 m
2016	European Championships	Amsterdam, Netherlands	18th (q)	61.89 m
2016	Olympic Games	Rio de Janeiro, Brazil	8th	63.72 m
2017	World Championships	London, United Kingdom	10th	63.17 m
2018	Commonwealth Games	Gold Coast, Australia	3rd	63.61 m
2018	Mediterranean Games	Tarragona, Spain	1st	62.98 m
2018	European Championships	Berlin, Germany	8th	63.62 m
2019	World Championships	Doha, Qatar	5th	66.32 m
2021	Olympic Games	Tokyo, Japan	17th (q)	62.11 m
2022	Mediterranean Games	Oran, Algeria	1st	63.59 m
2022	World Championships	Eugene, United States	16th (q)	62.46 m
2022	European Championships	Munich, Germany	8th	63.32 m
2023	World Championships	Budapest, Hungary	24th (q)	62.10 m
2024	European Championships	Rome, Italy	9th	62.53 m

== See also ==
- Gymnastic Association Pancypria
- Cypriot records in athletics
