= 2009 European Athletics U23 Championships – Men's discus throw =

The men's discus throw event at the 2009 European Athletics U23 Championships was held in Kaunas, Lithuania, at S. Dariaus ir S. Girėno stadionas (Darius and Girėnas Stadium) on 17 and 18 July.

== Medalists ==
Gold	Nikolay Sedyuk; Russia
Silver	Ivan Hryshyn; Ukraine
Bronze	Martin Wierig; Germany

== Results ==
=== Final ===
18 July

Rank	Name	Nationality	Attempts						Result	Notes
Rank	Name	Nationality	1	2	3	4	5	6	Result	Notes
1st place, gold medalist(s)	Nikolay Sedyuk	Russia	57.67	58.72	x	58.82	60.80	57.60	60.80	
2nd place, silver medalist(s)	Ivan Hryshyn	Ukraine	57.14	x	55.99	57.60	x	59.61	59.61	
3rd place, bronze medalist(s)	Martin Wierig	Germany	56.65	59.12	57.26	x	58.94	x	59.12	
4	Boudewijn Luijten	Netherlands	56.43	x	53.61	x	53.11	58.13	58.13	
5	Przemysław Czajkowski	Poland	56.47	57.58	x	x	x	x	57.58	
6	Fredrik Amundgård	Norway	56.87	57.38	56.30	x	x	x	57.38	
7	Robert Urbanek	Poland	56.81	54.09	56.05	54.57	57.38	54.30	57.38	
8	Per Rosell	Sweden	56.82	54.57	x	56.21	54.95	56.10	56.82	
9	Margus Hunt	Estonia	x	x	56.09				56.09	
10	Rosen Karamfilov	Bulgaria	52.09	55.13	53.95				55.13	
11	Savvas Aresti	Cyprus	52.79	x	53.35				53.35	
12	Pavlo Karsak	Ukraine	50.80	x	x				50.80	

=== Qualifications ===
17 July
Qualifying 57.00 or 12 best to the Final

==== Group A ====
Rank	Name	Nationality	Result	Notes
1	Martin Wierig	Germany	59.49	Q
2	Nikolay Sedyuk	Russia	57.46	Q
3	Przemysław Czajkowski	Poland	56.55	q
4	Pavlo Karsak	Ukraine	56.17	q
5	Savvas Aresti	Cyprus	54.36	q
6	Giedrius Šakinis	Lithuania	53.36	
7	Federico Apolloni	Italy	52.93	
8	Mihai Grasu	Romania	52.76	
9	Joni Mattila	Finland	52.76	
10	Maarten Persoon	Netherlands	52.71	
11	Péter Savanyú	Hungary	50.47	
12	Martin Stašek	Czech Republic	49.61	

==== Group B ====
Rank	Name	Nationality	Result	Notes
1	Fredrik Amundgård	Norway	58.47	Q
2	Ivan Hryshyn	Ukraine	57.67	Q
3	Robert Urbanek	Poland	56.58	q
4	Per Rosell	Sweden	56.40	q
5	Margus Hunt	Estonia	56.39	q
6	Rosen Karamfilov	Bulgaria	56.07	q
7	Boudewijn Luijten	Netherlands	54.65	q
8	Brett Morse	United Kingdom	54.16	
9	Mateusz Mikos	Poland	53.30	
10	Igor Mišljenović	Croatia	53.10	
11	Diego Centi	Italy	52.21	
12	Ulf Ankarling	Sweden	52.05	

== Participation ==
According to an unofficial count, 24 athletes from 18 countries participated in the event.

- Bulgaria (1)
- Croatia (1)
- Cyprus (1)
- Czech Republic (1)
- Estonia (1)
- Finland (1)
- Germany (1)
- Hungary (1)
- Italy (2)
- Lithuania (1)
- Netherlands (2)
- Norway (1)
- Poland (3)
- Romania (1)
- Russia (1)
- Sweden (2)
- Ukraine (2)
- United Kingdom (1)
