= 2011 European Cup Winter Throwing =

2011 European Throwing Cup
- Events: 16

The 2011 European Cup Winter Throwing was held on 19 and 20 March 2011 at the National Sports Academy in Sofia, Bulgaria. It was the eleventh edition of the athletics competition for throwing events and was jointly organised by the European Athletic Association and the Bulgarian Athletic Federation.

The competition featured men's and women's contests in shot put, discus throw, javelin throw and hammer throw. In addition to the senior competitions, there were also under-23 events for younger athletes. The first day of events was affected by poor weather, but Hungarian Olympic hammer thrower Krisztián Pars produced a series of throws over 79 metres, with a best of 79.84 m to win the men's event. Vira Rebryk won the under-23 women's javelin, while runner-up Liina Laasma broke the Estonian junior record. On the second day, eighteen-year-old javelin thrower Zigismunds Sirmais won the men's senior gold medal with a world junior record mark of 84.47 m. Turkey's Fatih Avan set a national record in the javelin to win in the under-23 section.

== Medal summary ==
=== Senior men ===
Event	Gold		Silver		Bronze	
Shot put	Hamza Alić (BIH)	20.21 m	Marco Fortes (POR)	20.18 m	Soslan Tsirikhov (RUS)	19.45 m
Discus throw	Ercüment Olgundeniz (TUR)	63.31 m	Erik Cadée (NED)	62.15 m	Sergiu Ursu (ROM)	62.00 m
Hammer throw	Krisztián Pars (HUN)	79.84 m	Yury Shayunou (BLR)	77.41 m	Aleksey Sokirskiy (UKR)	76.84 m
Javelin throw	Zigismunds Sirmais (LAT)	84.47 m WJR	Oleksandr Pyatnytsya (UKR)	81.96 m	Valeriy Iordan (RUS)	79.49 m
WR world record | AR area record | CR championship record | GR games record | NR national record | OR Olympic record | PB personal best | SB season best | WL world leading (in a given season)

=== Senior women ===
Event	Gold		Silver		Bronze	
Shot put	Alena Kopets (BLR)	17.71 m	Jessica Cérival (FRA)	17.52 m	Chiara Rosa (ITA)	17.39 m
Discus throw	Olesya Korotkova (RUS)	60.20 m	Nicoleta Grasu (ROM)	59.44 m	Vera Ganeyeva (RUS)	57.45 m
Hammer throw	Tatyana Lysenko (RUS)	73.70 m	Betty Heidler (GER)	72.71 m	Zalina Marghieva (MDA)	71.96 m
Javelin throw	Hanna Hatsko (UKR)	58.35 m	Esther Eisenlauer (GER)	56.99 m	Ásdís Hjálmsdóttir (ISL)	56.44 m
WR world record | AR area record | CR championship record | GR games record | NR national record | OR Olympic record | PB personal best | SB season best | WL world leading (in a given season)

=== Under-23 men ===
Event	Gold		Silver		Bronze	
Shot put	Siarhei Bakhar (BLR)	18.29 m	Dmytro Savytskyy (UKR)	18.27 m	Marin Premeru (CRO)	18.01 m
Discus throw	Mykyta Nesterenko (UKR)	59.71 m	Brett Morse (GBR)	59.50 m	Marin Premeru (CRO)	57.28 m
Hammer throw	Siarhei Kalamoets (BLR)	72.94 m	Eivind Henriksen (NOR)	72.37 m	Andriy Martynyuk (UKR)	71.10 m
Javelin throw	Fatih Avan (TUR)	80.19 m NR	Dmytro Kosynskyy (UKR)	79.90 m	Dmitri Tarabin (RUS)	78.61 m

=== Under-23 women ===
Event	Gold		Silver		Bronze	
Shot put	Anita Márton (HUN)	17.92 m	Yevgeniya Kolodko (RUS)	17.85 m	Sophie Kleeberg (GER)	16.77 m
Discus throw	Yekaterina Strokova (RUS)	55.56 m	Anita Márton (HUN)	53.84 m	Nastassia Kashtanava (BLR)	53.80 m
Hammer throw	Bianca Perie (ROM)	67.38 m	Sophie Hitchon (GBR)	64.16 m	Jessika Guehaseim (FRA)	62.43 m
Javelin throw	Vira Rebryk (UKR)	57.95 m	Liina Laasma (EST)	57.04 m NJR	Sanni Utriainen (FIN)	53.73 m
