= 2011 European Athletics U23 Championships – Men's discus throw =

The men's discus throw event at the 2011 European Athletics U23 Championships was held in Ostrava, Czech Republic, at Městský stadion on 16 and 17 July.

== Medalists ==
Gold	Lawrence Okoye; United Kingdom
Silver	Mykyta Nesterenko; Ukraine
Bronze	Fredrik Amundgård; Norway

== Results ==
=== Final ===
17 July 2011 / 17:20

Rank	Name	Nationality	Attempts						Result	Notes
Rank	Name	Nationality	1	2	3	4	5	6	Result	Notes
1st place, gold medalist(s)	Lawrence Okoye	United Kingdom	53.97	59.24	60.70	56.39	x	57.49	60.70	
2nd place, silver medalist(s)	Mykyta Nesterenko	Ukraine	x	55.29	59.67	x	x	58.57	59.67	
3rd place, bronze medalist(s)	Fredrik Amundgård	Norway	53.71	58.22	59.42	x	58.46	57.08	59.42	SB
4	Marin Premeru	Croatia	55.35	x	56.42	58.48	58.07	58.93	58.93	
5	Christoph Harting	Germany	55.80	54.87	58.65	x	56.85	x	58.65	
6	Daniel Jasinski	Germany	57.13	57.71	55.76	56.66	x	56.48	57.71	
7	Gordon Wolf	Germany	56.06	56.84	x	57.34	56.61	x	57.34	
8	Tomáš Voňavka	Czech Republic	51.78	56.43	x	54.72	x	56.06	56.43	
9	Mikhail Dvornikov	Russia	52.73	56.41	x				56.41	
10	Yeóryios Trémos	Greece	52.56	55.08	54.87				55.08	
11	Rosen Karamfilov	Bulgaria	x	54.30	54.93				54.93	
12	András Seres	Hungary	52.15	51.74	x				52.15	

=== Qualifications ===
Qualified: qualifying perf. 58.50 (Q) or 12 best performers (q) to the advance to the Final

==== Summary ====
Rank	Name	Nationality	Result	Notes
1	Lawrence Okoye	United Kingdom	59.97	Q
2	Daniel Jasinski	Germany	59.84	Q
3	Gordon Wolf	Germany	59.19	Q
4	András Seres	Hungary	59.09	Q PB
5	Mykyta Nesterenko	Ukraine	59.00	Q
6	Marin Premeru	Croatia	58.43	q
7	Yeóryios Trémos	Greece	58.06	q
8	Mikhail Dvornikov	Russia	57.41	q
9	Christoph Harting	Germany	57.37	q
10	Rosen Karamfilov	Bulgaria	57.11	q
11	Fredrik Amundgård	Norway	57.06	q
12	Tomáš Voňavka	Czech Republic	57.03	q
13	Andrius Gudžius	Lithuania	56.58	SB
14	Priidu Niit	Estonia	55.96	
15	Martin Kupper	Estonia	55.82	
16	Eligijus Ruškys	Lithuania	55.47	
17	Magnus Røsholm Aunevik-Berntsen	Norway	55.42	
18	Johnny Karlsson	Sweden	55.07	
19	Andrei Gag	Romania	54.83	
20	Pyry Niskala	Finland	53.66	
21	Vladislav Hruška	Czech Republic	53.62	
22	Lolassonn Djouhan	France	53.54	
23	Eduardo Albertazzi	Italy	52.80	
24	Martin Stašek	Czech Republic	51.97	
25	Blake Thomas Jakobsson	Iceland	50.94	
26	Itamar Levi	Israel	50.62	
	Brett Morse	United Kingdom	NM	
	Colin Quirke	Ireland	NM	

==== Details ====
===== Group A =====
16 July 2011 / 12:25

Rank	Name	Nationality	Attempts			Result	Notes
Rank	Name	Nationality	1	2	3	Result	Notes
1	Lawrence Okoye	United Kingdom	x	59.97		59.97	Q
2	Daniel Jasinski	Germany	59.84			59.84	Q
3	Gordon Wolf	Germany	56.69	57.76	59.19	59.19	Q
4	András Seres	Hungary	56.87	x	59.09	59.09	Q PB
5	Marin Premeru	Croatia	57.82	58.43	-	58.43	q
6	Rosen Karamfilov	Bulgaria	54.18	57.11	x	57.11	q
7	Martin Kupper	Estonia	55.64	x	55.82	55.82	
8	Eligijus Ruškys	Lithuania	x	52.86	55.47	55.47	
9	Magnus Røsholm Aunevik-Berntsen	Norway	55.42	55.02	53.90	55.42	
10	Johnny Karlsson	Sweden	55.07	54.92	x	55.07	
11	Andrei Gag	Romania	54.83	x	x	54.83	
12	Vladislav Hruška	Czech Republic	53.62	x	52.36	53.62	
13	Lolassonn Djouhan	France	x	53.13	53.54	53.54	
	Colin Quirke	Ireland	x	x	x	NM	

===== Group B =====
16 July 2011 / 13:35

Rank	Name	Nationality	Attempts			Result	Notes
Rank	Name	Nationality	1	2	3	Result	Notes
1	Mykyta Nesterenko	Ukraine	59.00			59.00	Q
2	Yeóryios Trémos	Greece	50.25	56.02	58.06	58.06	q
3	Mikhail Dvornikov	Russia	x	57.41	x	57.41	q
4	Christoph Harting	Germany	57.37	x	56.38	57.37	q
5	Fredrik Amundgård	Norway	56.01	x	57.06	57.06	q
6	Tomáš Voňavka	Czech Republic	57.03	x	x	57.03	q
7	Andrius Gudžius	Lithuania	x	56.58	x	56.58	SB
8	Priidu Niit	Estonia	x	55.96	x	55.96	
9	Pyry Niskala	Finland	53.66	53.41	52.60	53.66	
10	Eduardo Albertazzi	Italy	52.80	x	x	52.80	
11	Martin Stašek	Czech Republic	x	51.97	x	51.97	
12	Blake Thomas Jakobsson	Iceland	50.94	49.85	x	50.94	
13	Itamar Levi	Israel	50.62	49.23	49.59	50.62	
	Brett Morse	United Kingdom	x	x	x	NM	

== Participation ==
According to an unofficial count, 28 athletes from 20 countries participated in the event.

- Bulgaria (1)
- Croatia (1)
- Czech Republic (3)
- Estonia (2)
- Finland (1)
- France (1)
- Germany (3)
- Greece (1)
- Hungary (1)
- Iceland (1)
- Ireland (1)
- Israel (1)
- Italy (1)
- Lithuania (2)
- Norway (2)
- Romania (1)
- Russia (1)
- Sweden (1)
- Ukraine (1)
- United Kingdom (2)
