= Athletics at the 2016 Summer Olympics – Men's discus throw =

Men's discus throw at the Games of the XXXI Olympiad
- Venue: Estádio Olímpico João Havelange
- Dates: 12–13 August 2016
- Competitors: 35 from 24 nations
- Winning distance: 68.37

Medalists
| 1st place, gold medalist(s) | | Christoph Harting; Germany |
| 2nd place, silver medalist(s) | | Piotr Małachowski; Poland |
| 3rd place, bronze medalist(s) | | Daniel Jasinski; Germany |

Official Video Highlights

The men's discus throw competition at the 2016 Summer Olympics in Rio de Janeiro, Brazil, was held at the Estádio Olímpico João Havelange on 12–13 August. Thirty-five athletes from 24 nations competed. Germany's Christoph Harting succeeded his brother Robert Harting to the Olympic title. "It was the first time in Olympic history, in any sport, that brothers succeeded each other as Olympic champions in the same individual event." It was also the nation's third victory in the event (excluding those won by East and West Germany). Poland's Piotr Małachowski took the silver medal ahead of another German, Daniel Jasinski. Małachowski had also won silver eight years before, making him the 16th man to win multiple medals in the discus throw.

== Background ==
This was the 28th appearance of the event, which is one of 12 athletics events to have been held at every Summer Olympics. The returning finalists from the 2012 Games were gold medalist Robert Harting of Germany, silver medalist Ehsan Haddadi of Iran, bronze medalist (and 2008 gold medalist) Gerd Kanter of Estonia, fifth-place finisher (and 2008 silver medalist) Piotr Małachowski of Poland, seventh-place finisher (and 2008 finalist) Frank Casañas of Spain, eighth-place finisher Vikas Gowda of India, ninth-place finisher Benn Harradine of Australia, and eleventh-place finisher Jorge Fernandez of Cuba. Though injury had affected Robert Harting's 2015 season, he ranked third in the world before the competition. His brother Christoph Harting was one place higher, while the reigning 2015 World Champion Małachowski topped the world seasonal rankings.

Colombia and Kazakhstan each made their debut in the men's discus throw. The United States made its 27th appearance, most of any nation, having missed only the boycotted 1980 Games.

== Qualification ==
A National Olympic Committee (NOC) could enter up to 3 qualified athletes in the men's discus throw event if all athletes meet the entry standard during the qualifying period. (The limit of 3 has been in place since the 1930 Olympic Congress.) The qualifying standard was 65.00 metres. The qualifying period was from 1 May 2015 to 11 July 2016. The qualifying distance standards could be obtained in various meets during the given period that have the approval of the IAAF. Only outdoor meets were accepted. NOCs could also use their universality place—each NOC could enter one male athlete regardless of time if they had no male athletes meeting the entry standard for an athletics event—in the discus throw.

== Competition format ==
The competition used the two-round format introduced in 1936, with the qualifying round completely separate from the divided final. In qualifying, each athlete received three attempts; those recording a mark of at least 65.50 metres advanced to the final. If fewer than 12 athletes achieved that distance, the top 12 would advance. The results of the qualifying round were then ignored. Finalists received three throws each, with the top eight competitors receiving an additional three attempts. The best distance among those six throws counted.

== Summary ==
In qualification, Robert Harting could not reach his seasonal peak and was eliminated. Other prominent athletes who failed to progress were 2012 Olympic runner-up Ehsan Haddadi, 2015 World Championship bronze medalist Robert Urbanek and Fedrick Dacres, who was fourth on the world rankings. Only two athletes achieved the automatic qualifying mark: Małachowski headed the field over Lukas Weißhaidinger of Austria.

In the final, Małachowski seized the lead in the opening round with 67.32 m. He had three successive throws over 67 metres while Germany's Christoph Harting and Jasinski held second and third with throws over 66 metres. Those top three positions stood from round 2 through to the penultimate round. In the last round the competitors came to life: Estonia's Martin Kupper threw 66.58 m to take the silver medal position. Jasinski immediately replied with 67.05 m to move into second place himself. Harting, sitting outside the medals at that point, delivered a lifetime best of 68.37 m (224 ft 3 in) with his final throw to take the gold medal. Małachowski could not respond with his last effort and finished with the silver medal, having led for almost the entire competition and holding three of the four best marks of the 2016 Olympics. Harting's win made it the first time in Olympic athletics history that siblings had won successive gold medals.

== Records ==
Prior to the competition, the existing world and Olympic records were as follows.

| World record | Jürgen Schult (GDR) | 74.08 | Neubrandenburg, East Germany | 6 June 1986 |
| Olympic record | Virgilijus Alekna (LTU) | 69.89 | Athens, Greece | 23 August 2004 |

No new world or Olympic records were set during the competition. Christoph Harting's 68.37 metres was the best of 2016 to that point.

== Schedule ==
All times are Brasília Time (UTC−3).

| Date | Time | Round |
|---|---|---|
| Friday, 12 August 2016 | 09:30 | Qualifying |
| Saturday, 13 August 2016 | 10:50 | Final |

== Results ==
=== Qualifying ===
Qualification rule: qualification standard 65.50m (Q) or at least best 12 qualified (q).

| Rank | Group | Athlete | Nation | 1 | 2 | 3 | Distance | Notes |
|---|---|---|---|---|---|---|---|---|
| 1 | A | Piotr Małachowski | Poland | 64.69 | 65.89 | — | 65.89 | Q |
| 2 | A | Lukas Weißhaidinger | Austria | 63.43 | 65.86 | — | 65.86 | Q, SB |
| 3 | B | Christoph Harting | Germany | X | 64.49 | 65.41 | 65.41 | q |
| 4 | A | Andrius Gudžius | Lithuania | 59.50 | X | 65.18 | 65.18 | q, SB |
| 5 | A | Gerd Kanter | Estonia | 62.86 | 64.02 | X | 64.02 | q |
| 6 | B | Mason Finley | United States | 61.52 | 62.55 | 63.68 | 63.68 | q |
| 7 | B | Axel Härstedt | Sweden | 63.58 | X | X | 63.58 | q |
| 8 | B | Apostolos Parellis | Cyprus | 61.60 | 63.35 | 61.74 | 63.35 | q |
| 9 | B | Zoltán Kővágó | Hungary | 59.83 | 63.34 | 61.57 | 63.34 | q |
| 10 | B | Martin Kupper | Estonia | 61.15 | 62.92 | X | 62.92 | q |
| 11 | A | Daniel Jasinski | Germany | X | 62.83 | 61.30 | 62.83 | q |
| 12 | B | Philip Milanov | Belgium | 62.68 | 62.59 | X | 62.68 | q |
| 13 | B | Sven Martin Skagestad | Norway | 59.69 | 62.45 | X | 62.45 | |
| 14 | A | Daniel Ståhl | Sweden | 60.78 | x | 62.26 | 62.26 | |
| 15 | B | Robert Harting | Germany | X | X | 62.21 | 62.21 | |
| 16 | A | Andrew Evans | United States | X | 61.87 | X | 61.87 | |
| 17 | B | Robert Urbanek | Poland | X | 61.76 | 61.53 | 61.76 | |
| 18 | B | Mauricio Ortega | Colombia | X | 61.62 | X | 61.62 | |
| 19 | B | Matthew Denny | Australia | 60.78 | 61.16 | X | 61.16 | |
| 20 | A | Benn Harradine | Australia | 60.82 | 60.85 | 55.68 | 60.85 | |
| 21 | B | Guðni Valur Guðnason | Iceland | 53.51 | 60.45 | 59.37 | 60.45 | |
| 22 | A | Jorge Fernández | Cuba | 59.93 | 60.43 | 60.09 | 60.43 | |
| 23 | A | Mykyta Nesterenko | Ukraine | 57.87 | 60.28 | 60.31 | 60.31 | |
| 24 | B | Ehsan Haddadi | Iran | 57.86 | 59.92 | 60.15 | 60.15 | |
| 25 | B | Frank Casañas | Spain | X | 57.81 | 59.96 | 59.96 | |
| 26 | A | Tavis Bailey | United States | X | 59.81 | 59.25 | 59.81 | |
| 27 | A | Lois Maikel Martínez | Spain | X | 59.42 | X | 59.42 | |
| 28 | B | Vikas Gowda | India | 57.59 | 58.99 | 58.70 | 58.99 | |
| 29 | A | Alex Rose | Samoa | 57.24 | 56.47 | 54.42 | 57.24 | |
| 30 | A | Mahmoud Samimi | Iran | 56.94 | 55.43 | 56.07 | 56.94 | |
| 31 | A | Yevgeniy Labutov | Kazakhstan | 55.54 | 54.02 | 54.82 | 55.54 | |
| 32 | B | Oleksiy Semenov | Ukraine | 54.69 | 54.59 | 55.35 | 55.35 | |
| 33 | A | Sultan Mubarak Al-Dawoodi | Saudi Arabia | X | 54.09 | 54.84 | 54.84 | |
| 34 | A | Fedrick Dacres | Jamaica | X | X | 50.69 | 50.69 | |
| — | B | Danijel Furtula | Montenegro | X | X | X | No mark | |

=== Final ===
| Rank | Athlete | Nation | 1 | 2 | 3 | 4 | 5 | 6 | Distance | Notes |
|---|---|---|---|---|---|---|---|---|---|---|
| 1st place, gold medalist(s) | Christoph Harting | Germany | 62.38 | 66.34 | X | X | 64.77 | 68.37 | 68.37 | PB, WL |
| 2nd place, silver medalist(s) | Piotr Małachowski | Poland | 67.32 | 67.06 | 67.55 | X | 65.51 | 65.38 | 67.55 | |
| 3rd place, bronze medalist(s) | Daniel Jasinski | Germany | 65.77 | 65.01 | 66.08 | 64.83 | 63.31 | 67.05 | 67.05 | |
| 4 | Martin Kupper | Estonia | 64.47 | X | 62.88 | x | X | 66.58 | 66.58 | |
| 5 | Gerd Kanter | Estonia | 65.10 | 63.01 | 64.45 | 63.73 | X | X | 65.10 | |
| 6 | Lukas Weißhaidinger | Austria | 62.14 | 62.44 | 61.81 | X | X | 64.95 | 64.95 | |
| 7 | Zoltán Kővágó | Hungary | 64.50 | X | 62.98 | X | X | x | 64.50 | |
| 8 | Apostolos Parellis | Cyprus | 61.00 | 60.82 | 63.72 | X | 63.49 | 62.37 | 63.72 | |
| 9 | Philip Milanov | Belgium | 62.22 | X | X | Did not advance | | | 62.22 | |
| 10 | Axel Härstedt | Sweden | 54.77 | 62.12 | X | Did not advance | | | 62.12 | |
| 11 | Mason Finley | United States | 60.43 | X | 62.05 | Did not advance | | | 62.05 | |
| 12 | Andrius Gudžius | Lithuania | 60.66 | 58.89 | X | Did not advance | | | 60.66 | |
