= Martin Kupper =

Estonian discus thrower

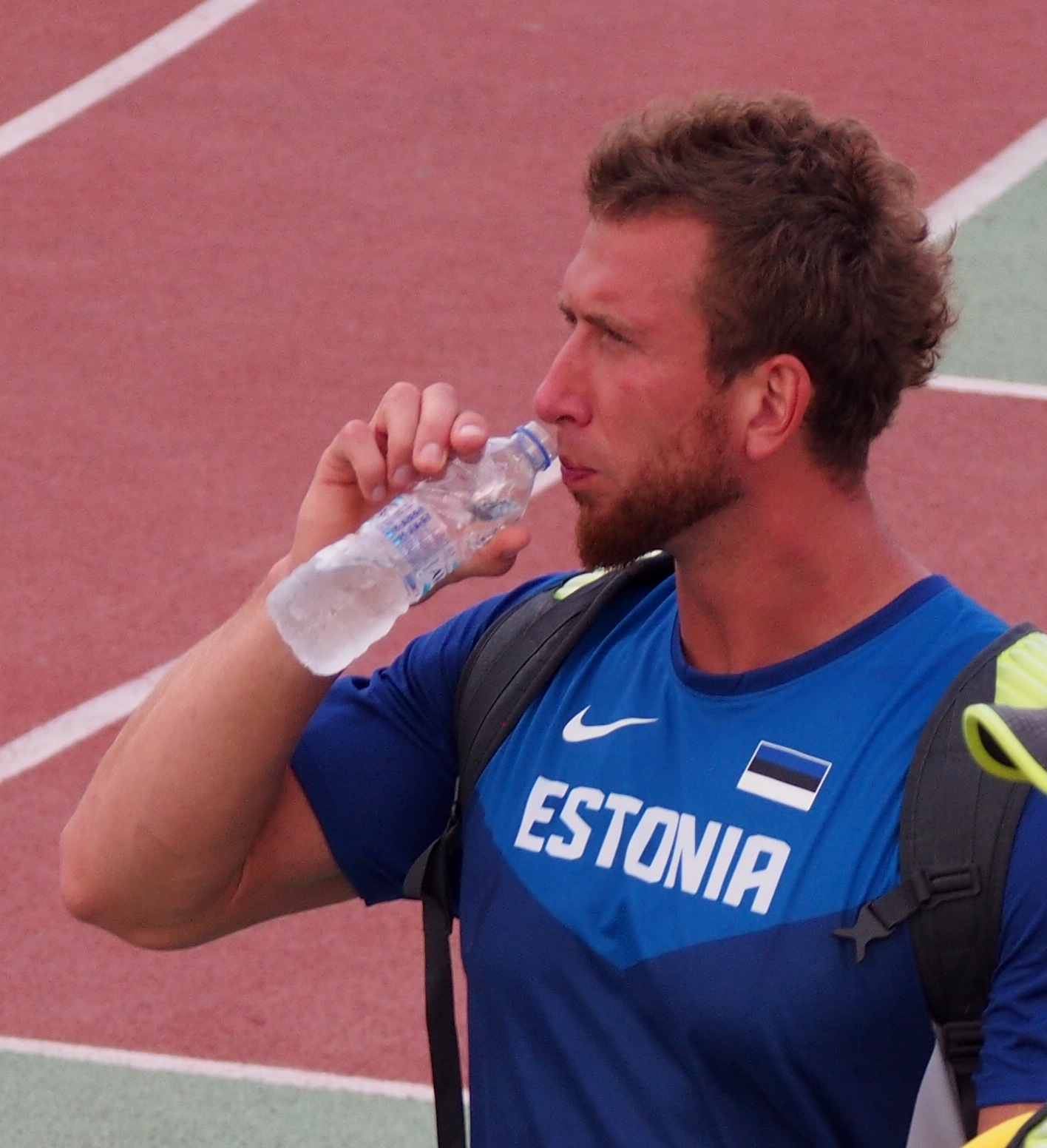
- Kupper during 2015 European Team Championships First League

Personal information
- Nationality: Estonian
- Born: 31 May 1989 (age 37) Tallinn, then part of Estonian SSR, Soviet Union

Sport
- Country: Estonia
- Sport: Athletics
- Event: Discus

Achievements and titles
- Personal best: 66.67 (2015)

Martin Kupper (born 31 May 1989, in Tallinn) is an Estonian track and field athlete who competes in the discus throw. He has a personal best of 66.67 m (218 ft 8 3/4 in), set in 2015. He is a member of the Audentese SK sports club.

He competed in the discus as a teenager and began to improve in 2010, setting a best of 55.19 m (181 ft 3/4 in) and coming seventh at the Nordic Under-23 Athletics Championships. He cleared the sixty-metre mark for the first time in 2011 with a new best of 60.18 m (197 ft 5 1/4 in) and made his debut at continental level at the 2011 European Athletics U23 Championships (competing in the qualifiers only). He improved for a third successive season in 2012, having a best of 62.32 m (204 ft 5 1/2 in) at the Kohila leg of the BIGBANK Kuldliiga series. He threw beyond sixty metres to finish eighth at the 2013 European Cup Winter Throwing then had a throw of 65.03 m (213 ft 4 in) in August, which ranked him 22nd on the global seasonal lists.

He made his debut at the European Championships in 2014 and finished the competition in ninth place. His best that year was 64.98 m (213 ft 2 1/4 in), putting him 26th globally. He put himself at the top of the seasonal lists at the start of the following year with a 66.67 m (218 ft 8 3/4 in) win at the 2015 European Cup Winter Throwing – his first international medal. He began to compete on the 2015 IAAF Diamond League circuit and had fourth-place finishes in Shanghai and Eugene. Further fourth places came at the FBK Games, the 2015 European Team Championships (1st League) and the 2016 Summer Olympics, with a throw at 66.58 m (218 ft 5 1/4 in).

== International competitions ==
Year	Competition	Venue	Position	Result
2011	European U23 Championships	Ostrava, Czech Republic	15th (q)	55.82 m
2013	European Cup Winter Throwing	Castellón de la Plana, Spain	8th	60.64 m
2014	European Cup Winter Throwing	Leiria, Portugal	10th	58.19 m
2014	European Championships	Zürich, Switzerland	9th	60.89 m
2015	European Cup Winter Throwing	Leiria, Portugal	1st	66.67 m
2015	European Team Championships 1st League	Heraklion, Greece	4th	59.36 m
2015	World Championships	Beijing, China	16th (q)	61.59 m
2016	European Throwing Cup	Arad, Romania	2nd	62.20 m
2016	European Championships	Amsterdam, Netherlands	7th	63.55 m
2016	Olympic Games	Rio de Janeiro, Brazil	4th	66.58 m
2017	European Throwing Cup	Las Palmas, Spain	3rd	62.86 m
2017	World Championships	London, United Kingdom	17th (q)	62.71 m
2018	European Championships	Berlin, Germany	13th (q)	62.13 m
2019	World Championships	Doha, Qatar	19th (q)	62.10 m
