= 2013 European Cup Winter Throwing =

2013 European Throwing Cup
- Events: 16

The 2013 European Cup Winter Throwing was held on 16 and 17 March at the Pista de Atletismo Universitat Jaume I and Complejo Deportivo Gaetà Huguet in Castellón, Spain. It was the thirteenth edition of the athletics competition in throwing events and was jointly organised by the European Athletic Association and the Real Federación Española de Atletismo. The competition featured men's and women's contests in shot put, discus throw, javelin throw and hammer throw. In addition to the senior competitions, there were also under-23 events for younger athletes. A total of 249 athletes from 38 nations entered the competition. It was the second time that Spain hosted the event, following on from the 2009 edition held in Tenerife.

Mariya Abakumova provided the highlight of the first day of competition, winning the women's javelin in a cup record and world-leading mark of 69.34 metres. Daniel Jasinski narrowly won the men's discus, beating 41-year-old Virgilijus Alekna by three centimetres. Krisztián Pars and Yevgeniya Kolodko were comfortable winners in the hammer throw and shot put, respectively. In the under-23 section Valeriy Iordan won with a javelin championship record of 82.89 m – the best by any athlete in the cup.

The best performance on the second day came from Nadine Müller, who won the discus with a world-leading 66.69 m. Borja Vivas won the only gold medal for the host country Spain in the men's shot puts, reaching twenty metres. The women's hammer contest was close with Zalina Marghieva beating the reigning Olympic champion Tatyana Lysenko with a throw of 71.98 m. The world junior record holder in the javelin, Zigismunds Sirmais, marked his transition from the junior ranks by winning the senior title. In the under-23 section Turkey's Emel Dereli won the women's shot put at the age of seventeen.

== Medal summary ==
=== Senior men ===
Men
Event	Gold		Silver		Bronze	
Shot put	Borja Vivas (ESP)	20.00 m	Georgi Ivanov (BUL)	19.68 m	Andriy Semenov (UKR)	19.55 m
Discus throw	Daniel Jasinski (GER)	64.69 m (PB)	Virgilijus Alekna (LTU)	64.66 m (SB)	Erik Cadée (NED)	64.38 m
Hammer throw	Krisztián Pars (HUN)	77.24 m	Pavel Kryvitski (BLR)	75.89 m	Paweł Fajdek (POL)	75.52 m
Javelin throw	Zigismunds Sirmais (LAT)	82.51 m	Thomas Röhler (GER)	81.87 m	Risto Mätas (EST)	79.10 m

=== Senior women ===
Women
Event	Gold		Silver		Bronze	
Shot put	Yevgeniya Kolodko (RUS)	19.04 m	Alena Kopets (BLR)	18.18 m	Irina Tarasova (RUS)	17.98 m
Discus throw	Nadine Müller (GER)	66.69 m (SB)	Mélina Robert-Michon (FRA)	61.26 m	Dragana Tomašević (SRB)	61.12 m
Hammer throw	Zalina Marghieva (MDA)	71.98 m	Tatyana Lysenko (RUS)	71.54 m	Kathrin Klaas (GER)	71.07 m
Javelin throw	Mariya Abakumova (RUS)	69.34 m (CR)	Vira Rebryk (UKR)	63.42 m (SB)	Linda Stahl (GER)	61.97 m

=== Under-23 men ===
Under-23 men
Event	Gold		Silver		Bronze	
Shot put	Daniel Ståhl (SWE)	18.63 m	Danijel Furtula (MNE)	18.18 m (PB)	Maksim Afonin (RUS)	18.00 m
Discus throw	Danijel Furtula (MNE)	62.10 m	Mykyta Nesterenko (UKR)	61.66 m (SB)	Eduardo Albertazzi (ITA)	60.69 m
Hammer throw	Quentin Bigot (FRA)	71.79 m	Ákos Hudi (HUN)	70.20 m	Serghei Marghiev (MDA)	69.72 m
Javelin throw	Valeriy Iordan (RUS)	82.89 m (CR)	Oleksandr Nychyporchuk (UKR)	75.93 m	Dejan Mileusnić (BIH)	74.43 m

=== Under-23 women ===
Under-23 women
Event	Gold		Silver		Bronze	
Shot put	Emel Dereli (TUR)	16.78 m	Sophie McKinna (GBR)	16.09 m	Fabienne Ngoma (FRA)	15.45 m (PB)
Discus throw	Shanice Craft (GER)	60.14 m (SB)	Irina Rodrigues (POR)	58.49 m	Yuliya Kurylo (UKR)	56.88 m
Hammer throw	Alexandra Tavernier (FRA)	66.20 m (SB)	Alyona Shamotina (UKR)	64.50 m	Hanna Zinchuk (BLR)	63.78 m
Javelin throw	Hanna Habina (UKR)	58.58 m	Yekaterina Starygina (RUS)	56.39 m (SB)	Tatsiana Khaladovich (BLR)	55.74 m (SB)
