= 2008 World Junior Championships in Athletics – Men's discus throw =

The men's discus throw event at the 2008 World Junior Championships in Athletics was held in Bydgoszcz, Poland, at Zawisza Stadium on 8 and 9 July 2008. A 1.75 kg (junior implement) discus was used.

== Medalists ==
Gold	Gordon Wolf; Germany
Silver	Marin Premeru; Croatia
Bronze	Mykyta Nesterenko; Ukraine

== Results ==
=== Final ===
9 July

Rank	Name	Nationality	Attempts						Result	Notes
Rank	Name	Nationality	1	2	3	4	5	6	Result	Notes
1st place, gold medalist(s)	Gordon Wolf	Germany	55.90	60.75	55.59	61.82	62.00	x	62.00	
2nd place, silver medalist(s)	Marin Premeru	Croatia	57.25	x	56.70	60.19	61.85	58.72	61.85	
3rd place, bronze medalist(s)	Mykyta Nesterenko	Ukraine	x	61.01	x	x	x	59.54	61.01	
4	Victor Hogan	South Africa	x	57.56	59.08	x	60.64	60.64	60.64	
5	Mikhail Dvornikov	Russia	58.77	58.96	58.99	59.89	59.44	59.67	59.89	
6	Andrius Gudžius	Lithuania	x	55.95	x	53.48	58.63	x	58.63	
7	Fredrik Amundgård	Norway	x	53.41	55.43	56.75	56.48	x	56.75	
8	Tibor Petrovszki	Hungary	56.41	54.52	53.46	55.62	x	54.95	56.41	
9	Mateusz Suchocki	Poland	48.31	54.65	49.40				54.65	
10	Hamed Mansour	Syria	x	54.14	x				54.14	
11	Alan Moreno	Mexico	52.69	x	52.50				52.69	
	Johnny Karlsson	Sweden	x	x	x				NM	

=== Qualifications ===
8 July

==== Group A ====
Rank	Name	Nationality	Attempts			Result	Notes
Rank	Name	Nationality	1	2	3	Result	Notes
1	Mikhail Dvornikov	Russia	57.71	52.78	58.53	58.53	q
2	Victor Hogan	South Africa	58.18	x	58.16	58.18	q
3	Andrius Gudžius	Lithuania	54.76	57.32	x	57.32	q
4	Mateusz Suchocki	Poland	51.43	50.58	55.80	55.80	q
5	Fredrik Amundgård	Norway	x	55.33	54.28	55.33	q
6	Johnny Karlsson	Sweden	x	53.62	52.52	53.62	q
7	Eduardo Albertazzi	Italy	53.06	46.58	50.22	53.06	
8	Curtis Griffith-Parker	United Kingdom	51.49	52.64	44.96	52.64	
9	Andrew Peska	Australia	48.21	52.29	50.70	52.29	
10	Claudiu Rusu	Romania	51.85	51.95	52.18	52.18	
11	Jérémy Baillard	France	49.91	35.61	51.00	51.00	
12	Daniel Jasinski	Germany	48.71	50.36	45.72	50.36	
13	Yeóryios Tremos	Greece	50.24	x	x	50.24	
14	Mario Cota	Mexico	49.43	x	-	49.43	
15	Geoffrey Tabor	United States	x	49.22	x	49.22	
16	George Bedoshvili	Georgia	x	48.91	46.15	48.91	

==== Group B ====
Rank	Name	Nationality	Attempts			Result	Notes
Rank	Name	Nationality	1	2	3	Result	Notes
1	Mykyta Nesterenko	Ukraine	61.77	-	-	61.77	Q
2	Marin Premeru	Croatia	59.29	-	-	59.29	Q
3	Gordon Wolf	Germany	56.18	58.60	57.04	58.60	q
4	Alan Moreno	Mexico	55.80	x	56.19	56.19	q
5	Hamed Mansour	Syria	x	53.97	55.17	55.17	q
6	Tibor Petrovszki	Hungary	51.26	51.92	54.74	54.74	q
7	Pyry Niskala	Finland	50.91	50.21	53.04	53.04	
8	Andrew Welch	Australia	51.67	52.88	51.20	52.88	
9	Priidu Niit	Estonia	48.79	48.34	51.88	51.88	
10	Quincy Wilson	Trinidad and Tobago	51.67	43.71	50.10	51.67	
11	Robert Tracz	Poland	x	49.77	51.49	51.49	
12	Brian Bishop	United States	49.48	51.22	51.05	51.22	
13	Magnus Røsholm Berntsen	Norway	x	x	48.75	48.75	
14	Andrei Gag	Romania	x	46.98	x	46.98	
	Brett Morse	United Kingdom	x	x	x	NM	

== Participation ==
According to an unofficial count, 31 athletes from 23 countries participated in the event.

- Australia (2)
- Croatia (1)
- Estonia (1)
- Finland (1)
- France (1)
- Georgia (1)
- Germany (2)
- Greece (1)
- Hungary (1)
- Italy (1)
- Lithuania (1)
- Mexico (2)
- Norway (2)
- Poland (2)
- Romania (2)
- Russia (1)
- South Africa (1)
- Sweden (1)
- Syria (1)
- Trinidad and Tobago (1)
- Ukraine (1)
- United Kingdom (2)
- United States (2)
