= Ladislav Prášil =

Czech shot putter

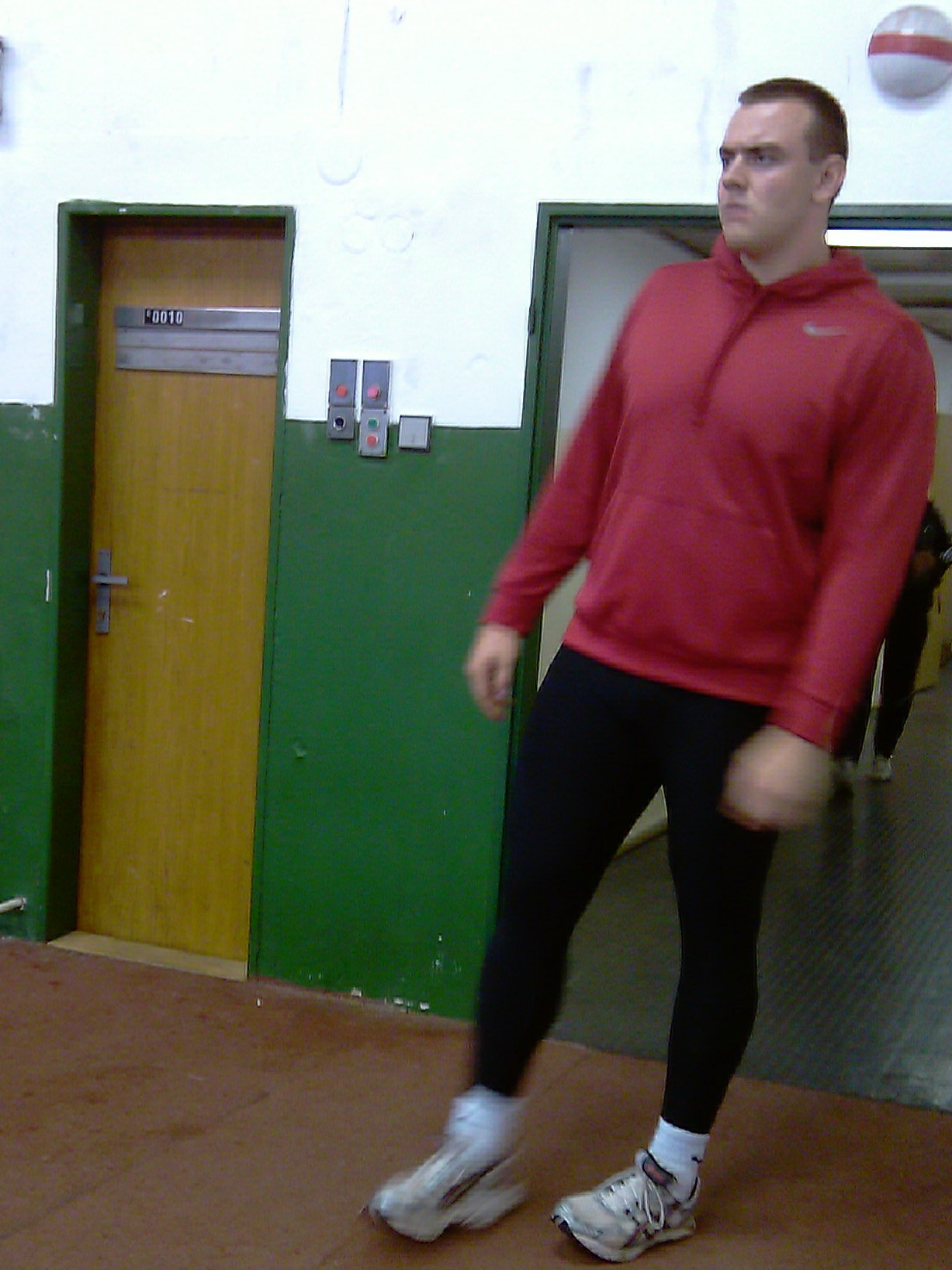

Personal information
- Nationality: Czech
- Born: 17 May 1990 (age 36) Czechoslovakia
- Height: 2.02 m (6 ft 8 in)
- Weight: >140 kg (310 lb)

Sport
- Country: Czech Republic
- Sport: Track and field
- Event: Shot put
- Club: TJ Dukla Praha
- Coached by: Petr Stehlík

Achievements and titles
- Personal best(s): Outdoor: 21.47 m Indoor: 20.51 m
Medal record
Men's athletics
Representing Czech Republic
European Indoor Championships
Bronze medal – third place	2013 Gothenburg	Shot put
Bronze medal – third place	2015 Prague	Shot put

Ladislav Prášil (Czech pronunciation: [ˈlaɟɪslaf ˈpraːʃɪl]; born 17 May 1990) is a Czech shot putter.

He won his first major medal, a bronze, at the 2013 European Indoor Championships. He repeated this achievement on home soil, coming third at the 2015 European Indoor Championships held in Prague.

His personal best throw is 21.47 meters, achieved in April 2013 in Potchefstroom.

== Competition record ==
Year	Competition	Venue	Position	Event	Notes
Representing Czech Republic
2007	World Youth Championships	Ostrava, Czech Republic	17th (q)	Shot put (5 kg)	16.97 m
2009	European Junior Championships	Novi Sad, Serbia	7th	Shot put (6 kg)	18.85 m
2011	European U23 Championships	Ostrava, Czech Republic	5th	Shot put	18.41 m
2012	European Championships	Helsinki, Finland	19th (q)	Shot put	18.87 m
2013	European Indoor Championships	Gothenburg, Sweden	3rd	Shot put	20.29 m
2013	World Championships	Moscow, Russia	5th	Shot put	20.98 m
2014	European Championships	Zürich, Switzerland	13th (q)	Shot put	19.83 m
2015	European Indoor Championships	Prague, Czech Republic	3rd	Shot put	20.66 m
2016	European Championships	Amsterdam, Netherlands	14th (q)	Shot put	19.56 m
2017	European Indoor Championships	Belgrade, Serbia	6th	Shot put	20.73 m
2017	World Championships	London, United Kingdom	18th (q)	Shot put	20.04 m
