= 2014 European Athletics Championships – Men's discus throw =

Men's discus throw at the European Athletics Championships

The men's discus throw at the 2014 European Athletics Championships took place at the Letzigrund on 12 and 13 August.

== Medalists ==
Gold	Robert Harting; Germany
Silver	Gerd Kanter; Estonia
Bronze	Robert Urbanek; Poland

== Records ==
Standing records prior to the 2014 European Athletics Championships
World record	Jürgen Schult (GDR)	74.08 m	Neubrandenburg, East Germany	6 June 1986
European record	Jürgen Schult (GDR)	74.08 m	Neubrandenburg, East Germany	6 June 1986
Championship record	Piotr Małachowski (POL)	68.87 m	Barcelona, Spain	1 August 2010
World Leading	Piotr Małachowski (POL)	69.28 m	Halle, Germany	17 May 2014
European Leading	Piotr Małachowski (POL)	69.28 m	Halle, Germany	17 May 2014

== Schedule ==
Date	Time	Round
12 August 2014	17:15	Qualifying
13 August 2014	20:35	Final

All times are local times (UTC+2)

== Results ==
=== Qualification ===
Qualification: Qualification Performance 64.00 (Q) or at least 12 best performers advance to the final

Rank	Group	Name	Nationality	#1	#2	#3	Mark	Note
1	A	Robert Harting	Germany	67.01			67.01	Q
2	A	Gerd Kanter	Estonia	65.79			65.79	Q
3	B	Piotr Małachowski	Poland	61.39	63.17	64.98	64.98	Q
4	B	Andrius Gudžius	Lithuania	64.44			64.44	Q
5	B	Daniel Jasinski	Germany	64.11			64.11	Q
6	B	Martin Wierig	Germany	63.89	63.74	63.96	63.96	q
7	A	Robert Urbanek	Poland	62.77	62.69	63.91	63.91	q
8	B	Viktor Butenko	Russia	62.96	x	x	62.96	q
9	B	Martin Kupper	Estonia	60.35	62.49	62.61	62.61	q
10	A	Frank Casañas	Spain	60.45	62.08	62.32	62.32	q
11	B	Mario Pestano	Spain	59.47	61.57	62.10	62.10	q
12	B	Axel Härstedt	Sweden	x	x	61.51	61.51	q
13	A	Erik Cadée	Netherlands	61.18	x	58.65	61.18	
14	A	Zoltán Kővágó	Hungary	59.72	61.14	x	61.14	
15	A	Gerhard Mayer	Austria	60.78	x	x	60.78	
16	A	Apostolos Parellis	Cyprus	59.22	57.79	60.32	60.32	
17	A	Danijel Furtula	Montenegro	59.82	60.23	59.69	60.23	
18	A	Roland Varga	Croatia	56.50	59.94	58.33	59.94	
19	A	Yeóryios Trémos	Greece	59.86	x	58.26	59.86	
20	B	Philip Milanov	Belgium	59.85	x	59.77	59.85	
21	A	Virgilijus Alekna	Lithuania	59.35	58.94	x	59.35	
22	A	Hannes Kirchler	Italy	58.48	57.12	59.24	59.24	
23	B	Giovanni Faloci	Italy	57.36	59.04	58.16	59.04	
24	A	Daniel Ståhl	Sweden	x	56.51	59.01	59.01	
25	A	Gleb Sidorchenko	Russia	58.41	x	x	58.41	
26	B	Aleksas Abromavičius	Lithuania	x	57.10	x	57.10	
	B	Niklas Arrhenius	Sweden	x	x	x	NM	
	B	Märt Israel	Estonia	x	r		NM	
	B	Róbert Szikszai	Hungary	x	x	x	NM	
	B	Oleksiy Semenov	Ukraine				DNS	

=== Final ===
Rank	Name	Nationality	#1	#2	#3	#4	#5	#6	Mark	Note
1st place, gold medalist(s)	Robert Harting	Germany	63.94	x	66.07	–	x	x	66.07	
2nd place, silver medalist(s)	Gerd Kanter	Estonia	59.48	x	64.75	63.31	62.82	x	64.75	
3rd place, bronze medalist(s)	Robert Urbanek	Poland	63.67	63.81	62.10	61.55	62.16	x	63.81	
4	Piotr Małachowski	Poland	62.01	59.96	x	x	63.54	x	63.54	
5	Viktor Butenko	Russia	62.80	62.71	x	60.44	59.31	59.48	62.80	
6	Mario Pestano	Spain	60.19	60.02	62.31	–	–	–	62.31	
7	Daniel Jasinski	Germany	59.34	58.65	61.49	x	62.04	x	62.04	
8	Frank Casañas	Spain	61.47	60.94	59.44	60.98	x	61.08	61.47	
9	Martin Kupper	Estonia	59.50	x	60.89				60.89	
10	Andrius Gudžius	Lithuania	60.82	59.85	57.56				60.82	
11	Martin Wierig	Germany	59.68	x	60.82				60.82	
12	Axel Härstedt	Sweden	60.01	59.63	x				60.01	
