= 2006 World Junior Championships in Athletics – Men's discus throw =

The men's discus throw event at the 2006 World Junior Championships in Athletics was held in Beijing, China, at Chaoyang Sports Centre on 15 and 16 August. A 1.75 kg (junior implement) discus was used.

== Medalists ==
Gold	Margus Hunt; Estonia
Silver	Mahmoud Samimi; Iran
Bronze	Martin Wierig; Germany

== Results ==
=== Final ===
16 August

Rank	Name	Nationality	Attempts						Result	Notes
Rank	Name	Nationality	1	2	3	4	5	6	Result	Notes
1st place, gold medalist(s)	Margus Hunt	Estonia	64.96	56.60	x	66.68	66.40	67.32	67.32	
2nd place, silver medalist(s)	Mahmoud Samimi	Iran	52.55	60.42	59.44	60.82	x	63.00	63.00	
3rd place, bronze medalist(s)	Martin Wierig	Germany	58.26	60.11	59.26	62.02	62.17	61.86	62.17	
4	Nikolay Sedyuk	Russia	60.38	61.09	57.20	59.01	55.13	62.00	62.00	
5	Jorge Fernández	Cuba	56.22	58.82	59.55	59.01	58.43	x	59.55	
6	Mihai Grasu	Romania	57.23	59.39	56.24	58.96	58.97	x	59.39	
7	Martin Wischer	Germany	54.57	x	56.73	53.56	56.26	x	56.73	
8	Egidijus Petrauskas	Lithuania	56.65	55.53	x	x	56.18	x	56.65	
9	Giedrius Šakinis	Lithuania	55.47	52.72	53.06				55.47	
10	Nicholas Robinson	United States	55.22	51.18	51.48				55.22	
11	Andrew Welch	Australia	51.54	54.14	52.22				54.14	
12	Marin Premeru	Croatia	51.96	51.22	53.50				53.50	

=== Qualifications ===
15 August

==== Group A ====
Rank	Name	Nationality	Attempts			Result	Notes
Rank	Name	Nationality	1	2	3	Result	Notes
1	Margus Hunt	Estonia	66.35	-	-	66.35	Q
2	Nikolay Sedyuk	Russia	x	60.43	-	60.43	Q
3	Mahmoud Samimi	Iran	58.91	-	-	58.91	Q
4	Jorge Fernández	Cuba	58.42	-	-	58.42	Q
5	Egidijus Petrauskas	Lithuania	54.20	51.92	57.85	57.85	Q
6	Martin Wischer	Germany	56.54	55.71	55.82	56.54	q
7	Axel Härstedt	Sweden	53.85	55.12	54.02	55.12	
8	Vladislav Tulácek	Czech Republic	x	x	54.46	54.46	
9	António Silva	Portugal	x	54.04	x	54.04	
10	Federico Apolloni	Italy	50.38	53.97	49.71	53.97	
11	Bo Taylor	United States	x	51.29	52.96	52.96	
12	Savvas Arestis	Cyprus	x	44.91	51.56	51.56	
13	Hou Wei	China	46.56	50.78	x	50.78	
14	Stephen Lasei	Samoa	x	39.34	41.10	41.10	

==== Group B ====
Rank	Name	Nationality	Attempts			Result	Notes
Rank	Name	Nationality	1	2	3	Result	Notes
1	Mihai Grasu	Romania	55.72	58.38	-	58.38	Q
2	Marin Premeru	Croatia	54.92	57.88	-	57.88	Q
3	Martin Wierig	Germany	57.78	-	-	57.78	Q
4	Nicholas Robinson	United States	55.20	56.06	50.68	56.06	q
5	Andrew Welch	Australia	50.62	54.03	55.58	55.58	q
6	Giedrius Šakinis	Lithuania	x	55.01	55.45	55.45	q
7	Alessandro Botti	Italy	55.40	54.87	54.98	55.40	
8	Hu Tai	China	54.24	55.02	51.06	55.02	
9	Maarten Persoon	Netherlands	51.44	x	53.07	53.07	
10	Pavlo Karsak	Ukraine	52.86	53.06	x	53.06	
11	Talat Erdogan	Turkey	50.50	50.95	48.81	50.95	
12	Per Rosell	Sweden	50.46	x	50.53	50.53	

== Participation ==
According to an unofficial count, 26 athletes from 20 countries participated in the event.

- Australia (1)
- China (2)
- Croatia (1)
- Cuba (1)
- Cyprus (1)
- Czech Republic (1)
- Estonia (1)
- Germany (2)
- Iran (1)
- Italy (2)
- Lithuania (2)
- Netherlands (1)
- Portugal (1)
- Romania (1)
- Russia (1)
- Samoa (1)
- Sweden (2)
- Turkey (1)
- Ukraine (1)
- United States (2)
