= Daniel Jasinski =

German discus thrower (born 1989)

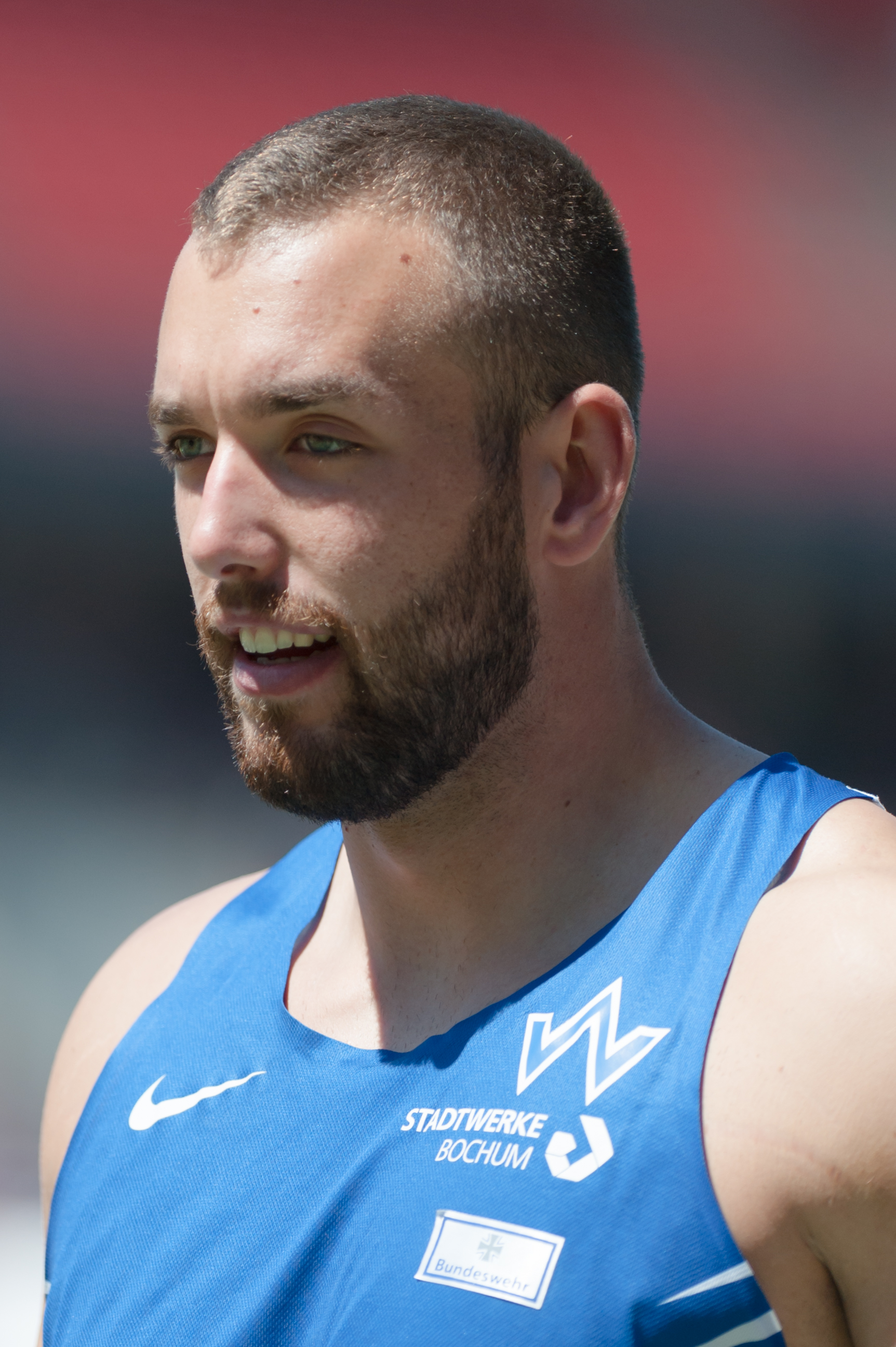
- Jasinski during the 2015 Athletics World Championships

Personal information
- Born: 5 August 1989 (age 36) Bochum, West Germany
- Education: Ruhr University Bochum
- Height: 2.07 m (6 ft 9 in)
- Weight: 125 kg (276 lb)

Sport
- Sport: Track and field
- Event: Discus throw
- Club: TV Wattenscheid 01
- Coached by: Mirosław Jasiński
Medal record
Men's athletics
Representing Germany
Olympic Games
Bronze medal – third place	2016 Rio de Janeiro	Discus throw
European Cup Winter Throwing
Gold medal – first place	2013 Leiria	Discus throw
- Updated on 18 August 2019

Daniel Jasinski (born 5 August 1989 in Bochum) is a male discus thrower from Germany. He won the Olympic bronze medal in 2016. It was an unexpected first medal in a major championship.

== Career ==
He competed at the 2015 World Championships in Beijing without qualifying for the final. In addition, he finished seventh at the 2014 European Championships in Zürich.

His father and coach Mirosław Jasiński, a former discus thrower himself, comes from Bydgoszcz, Poland. His father had previously coached Michael Möllenbeck and Oliver-Sven Buder to world championship medals.

His personal best in the event is 67.16 metres set in Wiesbaden in 2016.

== Competition record ==
Year	Competition	Venue	Position	Event	Notes
Representing Germany
2008	World Junior Championships	Bydgoszcz, Poland	24th (q)	Discus throw (1.75 kg)	50.36 m
2011	European U23 Championships	Ostrava, Czech Republic	6th	Discus throw	57.71 m
2013	Universiade	Shenzhen, China	9th	Discus throw	57.96 m
2014	European Championships	Zürich, Switzerland	7th	Discus throw	62.04 m
2015	World Championships	Beijing, China	15th (q)	Discus throw	61.70 m
2016	European Championships	Amsterdam, Netherlands	8th	Discus throw	63.35 m
2016	Olympic Games	Rio de Janeiro, Brazil	3rd	Discus throw	67.05 m
2018	European Championships	Berlin, Germany	19th (q)	Discus throw	60.10 m
2021	Olympic Games	Tokyo, Japan	10th	Discus throw	62.44 m
2023	World Championships	Budapest, Hungary	17th (q)	Discus throw	63.36 m

== See also ==
- Germany at the 2015 World Championships in Athletics
