= Przemysław Czajkowski =

Polish discus thrower (born 1988)

Personal information
- Nationality: Poland
- Born: 26 October 1988 (age 37) Wysokie Mazowieckie, Poland
- Height: 1.98 m (6 ft 6 in)
- Weight: 136 kg (300 lb) (2012)

Sport
- Sport: Athletics
- Event: Discus throw
- Club: AZS AWF Biała Podlaska
Medal record
Men's athletics
Representing Poland
Universiade
Silver medal – second place	2011 Shenzhen	Discus

Przemysław Czajkowski (born 26 October 1988) is a Polish athlete specialising in the discus throw. His personal best in the event is 65.61 meters, achieved in 2012 in Łódź.

He competed for Poland at the 2012 Summer Olympics, failing to qualify for the final.

== Competition record ==
Year	Competition	Venue	Position	Event	Notes
Representing Poland
2005	World Youth Championships	Marrakesh, Morocco	11th	Discus throw (1.75 kg)	49.87 m
2007	European Junior Championships	Hengelo, Netherlands	15th (q)	Discus throw (1.75 kg)	53.29 m
2009	European U23 Championships	Kaunas, Lithuania	5th	Discus throw	57.58 m
2010	European Championships	Barcelona, Spain	13th (q)	Discus throw	61.97 m
2011	Universiade	Shenzhen, China	2nd	Discus throw	63.62 m
2012	European Championships	Helsinki, Finland	13th (q)	Discus throw	62.22 m
2012	Olympic Games	London, United Kingdom	22nd (q)	Discus throw	61.08 m
