= Yevgeniy Labutov =

Kazakhstani discus thrower

Yevgeniy Labutov (born November 17, 1984) is a Kazakhstani discus thrower. He competed at the 2016 Summer Olympics in the men's discus throw event; his mark of 55.54 meters in the qualifying round did not qualify him for the final.

In 2017 he tested positive for Dehydrochloromethyltestosterone and was banned from competition for four years between 30 March 2017 and 4 May 2021.
