= 2013 European Athletics Indoor Championships – Men's shot put =

The men's shot put event at the 2013 European Athletics Indoor Championships was held on 28 February 2013 at 19:00 (qualification) and 1 March, 18:45 (final) local time.

== Records ==
Standing records prior to the 2013 European Athletics Indoor Championships
World record	Randy Barnes (USA)	22.66	Los Angeles, United States	20 January 1989
European record	Ulf Timmermann (GDR)	22.55	Senftenberg, East Germany	11 February 1989
Championship record	Ulf Timmermann (GDR)	22.19	Liévin, France	21 February 1987
World Leading	Ryan Whiting (USA)	21.59	State College, PA, United States	2 February 2013
European Leading	Martin Stašek (CZE)	20.73	Prague, Czech Republic	17 February 2013

== Results ==
=== Qualification ===
Qualification: Qualification Performance 20.15 (Q) or at least 8 best performers advanced to the final.

Rank	Athlete	Nationality	#1	#2	#3	Result	Note
1	Asmir Kolašinac	Serbia	20.31			20.31	Q
2	Hamza Alić	Bosnia and Herzegovina	x	19.38	20.05	20.05	q, SB
3	Ladislav Prášil	Czech Republic	19.82	x	20.03	20.03	q
4	Aleksandr Bulanov	Russia	18.76	19.58	19.92	19.92	q, PB
5	Ralf Bartels	Germany	19.70	19.80	19.89	19.89	q
6	Marco Fortes	Portugal	19.29	18.78	19.78	19.78	q, SB
7	Marco Schmidt	Germany	19.77	x	x	19.77	q
8	Niklas Arrhenius	Sweden	19.07	19.73	x	19.73	q
9	Kemal Mešić	Bosnia and Herzegovina	19.71	x	x	19.71	
10	Leif Arrhenius	Sweden	19.61	x	x	19.61	
11	Hüseyin Atıcı	Turkey	19.46	19.41	19.59	19.59	NR
12	Maksim Sidorov	Russia	19.58	x	19.40	19.58	
13	Valeriy Kokoyev	Russia	18.81	x	19.53	19.55	
14	Andriy Semenov	Ukraine	19.34	x	19.53	19.53	
15	Georgi Ivanov	Bulgaria	x	19.52	x	19.52	
16	Nedžad Mulabegović	Croatia	19.30	19.42	x	19.42	
17	Borja Vivas	Spain	19.30	19.00	19.18	19.30	
18	Martin Stašek	Czech Republic	18.96	x	x	18.96	
19	Marin Premeru	Croatia	18.13	18.64	18.86	18.86	
20	Lukas Weißhaidinger	Austria	x	18.38	x	18.38	
21	Raigo Toompuu	Estonia	17.93	18.15	18.28	18.28	
22	Marco Dodoni	Italy	17.65	x	17.33	17.65	
23	Rimantas Martišauskas	Lithuania	17.37	16.62	16.84	17.37	
24	Adriatik Hoxha	Albania	17.01	16.94	x	17.01	=SB

=== Final ===
The final was held at 18:45.

Rank	Athlete	Nationality	#1	#2	#3	#4	#5	#6	Result	Note
1st place, gold medalist(s)	Asmir Kolašinac	Serbia	x	20.60	20.21	20.62	20.51	20.49	20.62	SB
2nd place, silver medalist(s)	Hamza Alić	Bosnia and Herzegovina	20.15	x	x	20.34	x	19.56	20.34	PB
3rd place, bronze medalist(s)	Ladislav Prášil	Czech Republic	19.22	19.72	20.29	x	19.92	x	20.29	
4	Ralf Bartels	Germany	19.75	x	19.94	x	20.16	19.76	20.16	SB
5	Marco Fortes	Portugal	x	19.90	x	19.70	20.02	x	20.02	SB
6	Aleksandr Bulanov	Russia	18.77	19.36	x	x	19.70	19.42	19.70	
7	Marco Schmidt	Germany	x	19.50	x	x	19.63	19.52	19.63	
8	Niklas Arrhenius	Sweden	x	18.76	18.70	19.17	x	19.02	19.17	
