= Christoph Harting =

German discus thrower (born 1990)

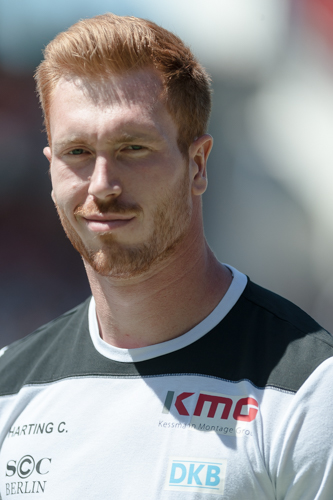
- Harting in 2015

Personal information
- Born: 10 April 1990 (age 36) Cottbus, East Germany
- Height: 2.07 m (6 ft 9 in)
- Weight: 120 kg (265 lb)

Sport
- Country: Germany
- Sport: Athletics
- Event: Discus throw

Achievements and titles
- Personal best: 68.37 m (2016)
Medal record
Olympic Games
Gold medal – first place	2016 Rio de Janeiro	Discus throw
- Updated on 13 August 2016

Christoph Harting (born 10 April 1990) is a German athlete specialising in the discus throw. He won the gold medal at the 2016 Summer Olympics in Rio de Janeiro. He competed at the 2013 and 2015 World Championships, reaching the final on the second occasion.

He is the younger brother of multiple-time world champion and fellow Olympic gold medalist Robert Harting.

== International competitions ==
Year	Competition	Venue	Position	Notes
Representing Germany
2011	European U23 Championships	Ostrava, Czech Republic	5th	58.65 m
2013	World Championships	Moscow, Russia	13th (q)	62.28 m
2015	World Championships	Beijing, China	8th	63.94 m
2016	European Championships	Amsterdam, Netherlands	4th	65.13 m
2016	Olympic Games	Rio de Janeiro, Brazil	1st	68.37 m PB
2018	European Championships	Berlin, Germany	–	NM
2019	World Championships	Doha, Qatar	14th (q)	63.08 m
