= 2016 European Athletics Championships – Men's shot put =

Men's shot put at the European Athletics Championships
- Venue: Olympic Stadium
- Location: Amsterdam
- Dates: 9 July (qualification); 10 July (final)
- Competitors: 29 from 18 nations
- Winning mark: 21.31 m EL

Medalists
gold medal	David Storl	Germany
silver medal	Michał Haratyk	Poland
bronze medal	Tsanko Arnaudov	Portugal

The men's shot put at the 2016 European Athletics Championships took place at the Olympic Stadium on 9 and 10 July.

== Records ==
Standing records prior to the 2014 European Athletics Championships
World record	Randy Barnes (USA)	23.12 m	Westwood, United States	20 May 1990
European record	Ulf Timmermann (GDR)	23.06 m	Chania, Greece	22 May 1988
Championship record	Werner Günthör (SUI)	22.22 m	Stuttgart, West Germany	28 August 1986
World Leading	Joe Kovacs (USA)	22.13 m	Eugene, United States	27 May 2016
European Leading	Michal Haratyk (POL)	21.23 m	Kielce, Poland	8 May 2016

== Schedule ==
Date	Time	Round
9 July 2016	13:05	Qualification
10 July 2016	17:30	Final

All times are local times (UTC+2)+

== Results ==
=== Qualification ===
Qualification: 20.30 m (Q) or best 12 performers (q)

Rank	Group	Name	Nationality	#1	#2	#3	Result	Notes
1	A	David Storl	Germany	20.84			20.84	Q
2	A	Konrad Bukowiecki	Poland	19.80	20.65		20.65	Q
3	B	Michał Haratyk	Poland	19.27	19.54	20.45	20.45	Q
4	B	Tsanko Arnaudov	Portugal	20.06	20.42		20.42	Q, SB
5	B	Tobias Dahm	Germany	20.42			20.42	Q, PB
6	B	Stipe Žunić	Croatia	19.71	19.67	20.24	20.24	q
7	B	Carlos Tobalina	Spain	20.16	19.68	–	20.16	q, SB
8	B	Asmir Kolašinac	Serbia	20.12	20.14	x	20.14	q
9	A	Borja Vivas	Spain	20.10	19.88	20.12	20.12	q
10	A	Nikolaos Skarvelis	Greece	19.80	19.96	20.11	20.11	q
11	A	Andrei Toader	Romania	x	19.51	20.00	20.00	q
12	B	Mesud Pezer	Bosnia and Herzegovina	19.15	19.72	19.67	19.72	q
13	A	Hamza Alić	Bosnia and Herzegovina	x	x	19.61	19.61	
14	A	Ladislav Prášil	Czech Republic	18.93	19.22	19.56	19.56	
15	A	Nedžad Mulabegović	Croatia	19.11	19.38	19.55	19.55	
16	B	Andrei Gag	Romania	19.49	19.38	x	19.49	
17	A	Bob Bertemes	Luxembourg	x	19.39	19.13	19.39	
18	A	Aliaksei Nichypor	Belarus	18.06	19.34	x	19.34	
19	B	Mikhail Abramchuk	Belarus	18.02	19.06	x	19.06	
20	B	Arttu Kangas	Finland	x	18.66	18.91	18.91	
21	B	Kristo Galeta	Estonia	18.76	18.50	18.23	18.76	
22	B	Filip Mihaljević	Croatia	18.72	x	18.53	18.72	
23	A	Leif Arrhenius	Sweden	18.64	x	x	18.64	
23	A	Marco Fortes	Portugal	x	18.64	x	18.64	
25	B	Sebastiano Bianchetti	Italy	18.38	18.56	x	18.56	
26	B	Ivan Emilianov	Moldova	18.38	17.99	18.09	18.38	
27	B	Martin Stašek	Czech Republic	x	18.32	x	18.32	
	A	Georgi Ivanov	Bulgaria	x	x	x	NM	
	A	Kemal Mešić	Bosnia and Herzegovina	x	x	x	NM	

=== Final ===
Rank	Athlete	Nationality	#1	#2	#3	#4	#5	#6	Result	Notes
1st place, gold medalist(s)	David Storl	Germany	x	21.03	20.84	x	21.31	x	21.31	EL
2nd place, silver medalist(s)	Michał Haratyk	Poland	20.77	19.92	20.22	21.19	x	20.53	21.19	
3rd place, bronze medalist(s)	Tsanko Arnaudov	Portugal	20.59	x	x	19.28	19.87	x	20.59	SB
4	Konrad Bukowiecki	Poland	20.52	20.58	20.55	20.48	19.81	x	20.58	
5	Asmir Kolašinac	Serbia	20.01	20.05	x	x	x	20.43	20.43	
6	Tobias Dahm	Germany	20.03	20.25	19.76	19.78	20.17	20.13	20.25	
7	Borja Vivas	Spain	19.58	20.15	20.03	x	20.16	20.16	20.16	
8	Stipe Žunić	Croatia	19.95	x	x				19.95	
9	Carlos Tobalina	Spain	19.15	x	19.85				19.85	
10	Nikolaos Skarvelis	Greece	19.34	19.55	19.12				19.55	
11	Mesud Pezer	Bosnia and Herzegovina	x	x	19.49				19.49	
DQ	Andrei Toader	Romania	19.90	20.18	x	19.52	20.18	20.26	~~20.26~~	
