= Martin Wierig =

German discus thrower (born 1987)

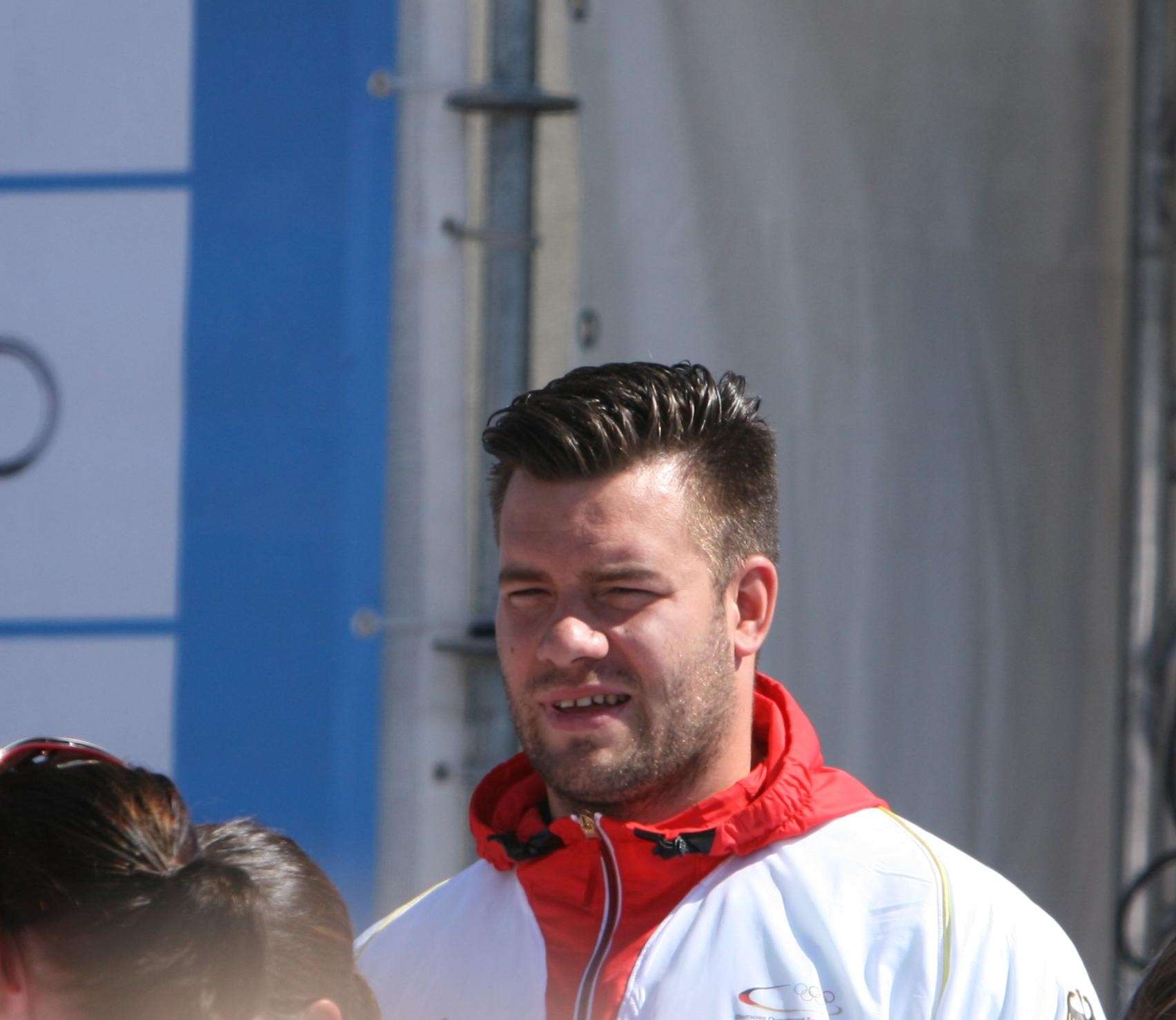
- Wierig in Hamburg (2012)

Personal information
- Born: 10 June 1987 (age 38) Beckendorf-Neindorf, East Germany
- Height: 2.02 m (6 ft 7 1/2 in)
- Weight: 124 kg (273 lb)

Sport
- Country: Germany
- Sport: Athletics
- Event: Discus
- Coached by: Armin Lemme
- Updated on 12 August 2012

Martin Wierig (born 10 June 1987 in Beckendorf-Neindorf) is a German discus thrower.

== International competitions ==
Representing Germany
Year	Competition	Venue	Position	Event	Notes
2004	World Junior Championships	Grosseto, Italy	8th	Discus (1.75 kg)	57.88 m
2005	European Junior Championships	Kaunas, Lithuania	3rd	Discus throw (1.75 kg)	59.04
2006	World Junior Championships	Beijing, China	3rd	Discus throw (1.75 kg)	62.17 m
2007	European U23 Championships	Debrecen, Hungary	1st	Discus throw	61.10 m
2009	European U23 Championships	Kaunas, Lithuania	3rd	Discus throw	59.12 m
2010	European Championships	Barcelona, Spain	7th	Discus throw	63.32
2012	European Championships	Helsinki, Finland	15th (q)	Discus throw	61.34
2012	Olympic Games	London, United Kingdom	6th	Discus throw	65.85
2013	World Championships	Moscow, Russia	4th	Discus throw	65.02
2014	European Championships	Zürich, Switzerland	11th	Discus throw	60.82
2015	World Championships	Beijing, China	19th (q)	Discus throw	61.35 m
2016	European Championships	Amsterdam, Netherlands	14th (q)	Discus throw	63.60 m
2017	World Championships	London, United Kingdom	–	Discus throw	NM
2019	World Championships	Doha, Qatar	8th	Discus throw	64.98 m
2022	World Championships	Eugene, United States	17th (q)	Discus throw	62.28 m
