= Marin Premeru =

Croatian athlete

Medal record

Men's Athletics

Representing Croatia

Mediterranean Games
Silver medal – second place	Mersin 2013	Shot put

World Junior Championships
Silver medal – second place	2008 Bydgoszcz	Discus Throw
Bronze medal – third place	2008 Bydgoszcz	Shot Put

World Youth Championships
Silver medal – second place	2007 Ostrava	Discus Throw
Silver medal – second place	2007 Ostrava	Shot put

European U23 Championships
Bronze medal – third place	2011 Ostrava	Shot put

European Junior Championships
Bronze medal – third place	2009 Novi Sad	Discus throw

European Winter Throwing Cup
Silver medal – second place	2010 Arles	Discus Throw
Bronze medal – third place	2011 Sofia	Discus Throw
Bronze medal – third place	2011 Sofia	Shot Put

Marin Premeru (born 29 August 1990, in Rijeka) is a Croatian discus thrower and shot putter with a personal best of 63.38 in the discus and 20.59 in the shot put. With 22.79 metres, Premeru is the third best youth competitor in history in 5 kg shot put.

Premeru was coached by Ivan Ivančić.

Premeru served a four-year ban from 2016 to 2020 for an anti-doping rule violation after testing positive for GHRP-2.

== Competition record ==
Year	Competition	Venue	Position	Event	Notes
Representing Croatia
2006	World Junior Championships	Beijing, China	28th (q)	Shot put (6 kg)	16.54 m
2006	World Junior Championships	Beijing, China	12th	Discus (1.75 kg)	53.50 m
2007	World Youth Championships	Ostrava, Czech Republic	2nd	Shot put (5 kg)	20.42 m
2007	World Youth Championships	Ostrava, Czech Republic	2nd	Discus throw (1.5 kg)	64.20 m
2007	European Junior Championships	Hengelo, Netherlands	15th (q)	Shot put (5 kg)	17.46 m
2008	World Junior Championships	Bydgoszcz, Poland	3rd	Shot put (6 kg)	19.93 m
2008	World Junior Championships	Bydgoszcz, Poland	2nd	Discus throw (1.75 kg)	61.85 m
2009	European Junior Championships	Novi Sad, Serbia	3rd	Discus throw (1.75 kg)	60.98 m
2010	European Cup Winter Throwing (U23)	Arles, France	2nd	Discus throw	62.10 m
2010	European Championships	Barcelona, Spain	30th (q)	Discus throw	58.03 m
2011	European Cup Winter Throwing (U23)	Sofia, Bulgaria	3rd	Shot put	18.01 m
2011	European Cup Winter Throwing (U23)	Sofia, Bulgaria	3rd	Discus throw	57.28 m
2011	European U23 Championships	Ostrava, Czech Republic	3rd	Shot put	18.83 m
2011	European U23 Championships	Ostrava, Czech Republic	4th	Discus	58.93 m
2012	European Championships	Helsinki, Finland	20th (q)	Shot put	18.71 m
2013	European Indoor Championships	Gothenburg, Sweden	19th (q)	Shot put	18.86 m
2013	Mediterranean Games	Mersin, Turkey	2nd	Shot put	19.72 m
2013	World Championships	Moscow, Russia	25th (q)	Shot put	18.71 m
2014	European Championships	Zürich, Switzerland	16th (q)	Shot put	19.55 m
2015	World Championships	Beijing, China	23rd (q)	Shot put	19.33 m
