= 2016 European Athletics Championships – Men's discus throw =

Men's discus throw at the European Athletics Championships
- Venue: Olympic Stadium
- Location: Amsterdam
- Dates: 7 July (qualification); 9 July (final)
- Competitors: 30 from 17 nations
- Winning mark: 67.06 m

Medalists
gold medal	Piotr Małachowski	Poland
silver medal	Philip Milanov	Belgium
bronze medal	Gerd Kanter	Estonia

The men's discus throw at the 2016 European Athletics Championships took place at the Olympic stadium for the finals and at the Museumplein for qualifying on 7 and 9 July.

== Records ==
Standing records prior to the 2016 European Athletics Championships
World record	Jürgen Schult (GDR)	74.08 m	Neubrandenburg, East Germany	6 June 1986
European record	Jürgen Schult (GDR)	74.08 m	Neubrandenburg, East Germany	6 June 1986
Championship record	Piotr Małachowski (POL)	68.87 m	Barcelona, Spain	1 August 2010
World Leading	Piotr Małachowski (POL)	68.15 m	Warsaw, Poland	28 May 2016
European Leading	Piotr Małachowski (POL)	68.15 m	Warsaw, Poland	28 May 2016

== Schedule ==
Date	Time	Round
7 July 2016	17:15	Qualifying
9 July 2016	20:35	Final

All times are local times (UTC+2)

== Results ==
=== Qualification ===
Qualification: 64.00 m (Q) or best 12 performers (q)

Rank	Group	Name	Nationality	#1	#2	#3	Result	Note
1	A	Lois Maikel Martinez	Spain	x	66.00		66.00	Q
2	A	Daniel Ståhl	Sweden	x	x	65.78	65.78	Q
3	A	Zoltán Kővágó	Hungary	65.21			65.21	Q
4	A	Gerd Kanter	Estonia	61.07	65.13		65.13	Q, SB
5	A	Christoph Harting	Germany	63.74	x	65.09	65.09	Q
6	B	Daniel Jasinski	Germany	62.03	64.89		64.89	Q
7	B	Philip Milanov	Belgium	64.53			64.53	Q
8	B	Robert Urbanek	Poland	64.28			64.28	Q
9	B	Martin Kupper	Estonia	64.23			64.23	Q
10	B	Piotr Małachowski	Poland	63.95	64.15		64.15	Q
11	B	Rutger Smith	Netherlands	61.36	62.70	63.85	63.85	q, SB
12	B	Hannes Kirchler	Italy	63.12	63.74	x	63.74	q
13	B	Andrius Gudžius	Lithuania	63.37	61.58	63.60	63.60	=SB
14	A	Martin Wierig	Germany	x	x	63.60	63.60	
15	A	Danijel Furtula	Montenegro	60.57	59.45	63.14	63.14	
16	B	Sven Martin Skagestad	Norway	57.34	62.04	x	62.04	
17	A	Erik Cadée	Netherlands	61.79	61.93	x	61.93	
18	A	Apostolos Parellis	Cyprus	61.89	x	x	61.89	
19	B	Niklas Arrhenius	Sweden	x	x	61.63	61.63	
20	B	Mykyta Nesterenko	Ukraine	x	x	61.35	61.35	
21	A	Bartłomiej Stój	Poland	x	61.30	x	61.30	
22	A	Guðni Valur Guðnason	Iceland	58.18	57.91	61.20	61.20	SB
23	A	János Huszák	Hungary	x	60.58	x	60.58	
24	B	Frank Casañas	Spain	x	x	59.06	59.06	
25	A	Tomáš Vonavka	Czech Republic	x	58.39	57.41	58.39	
26	B	Róbert Szikszai	Hungary	58.01	x	x	58.01	
27	A	Oleksiy Semenov	Ukraine	53.82	56.27	57.94	57.94	
	A	Eligijus Ruškys	Lithuania	x	x	x	NM	
	B	Ercüment Olgundeniz	Turkey	x	x	x	NM	
	B	Axel Härstedt	Sweden	x	x	x	NM	

=== Final ===
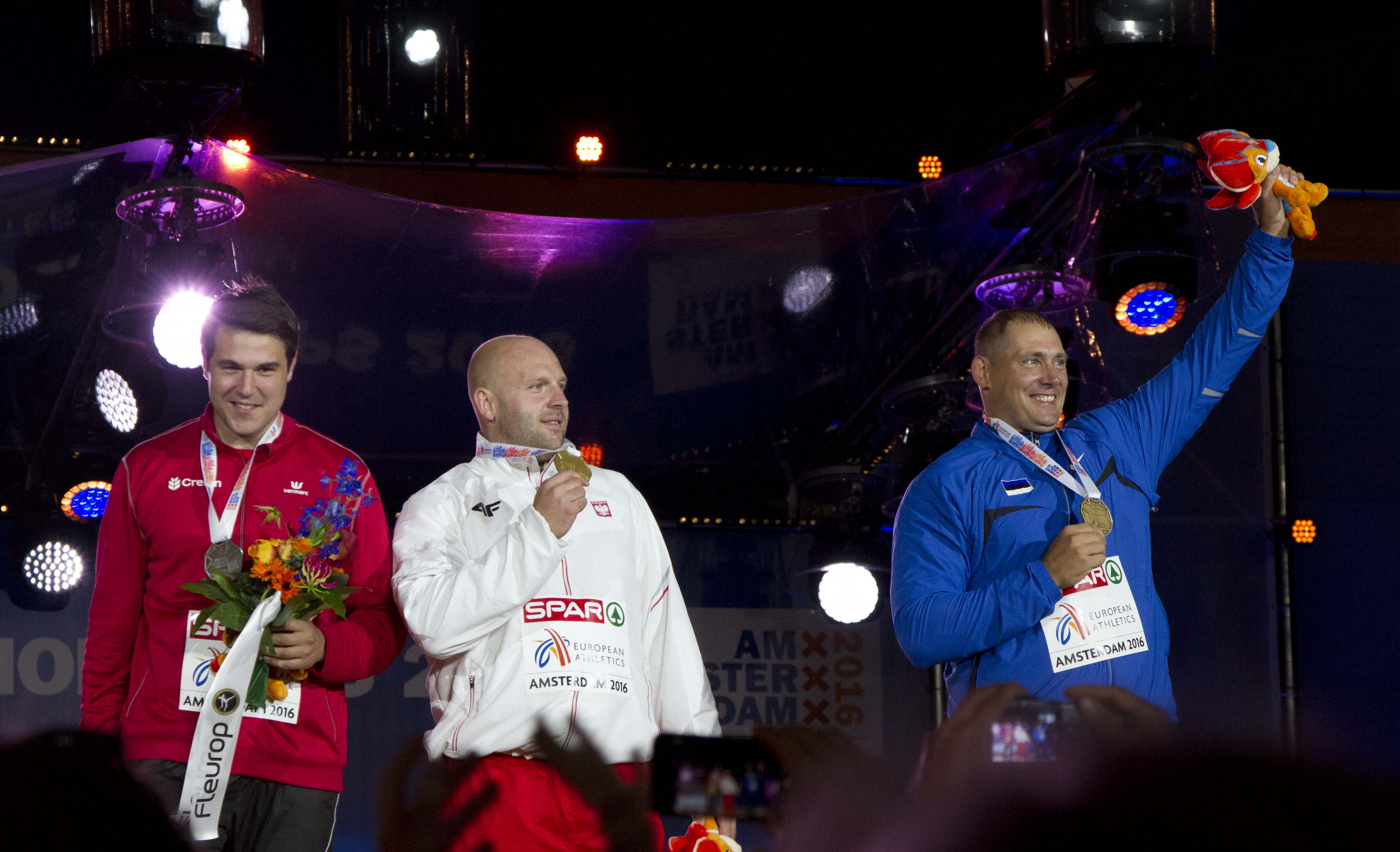
The medallists

Rank	Athlete	Nationality	#1	#2	#3	#4	#5	#6	Result	Notes
1st place, gold medalist(s)	Piotr Małachowski	Poland	62.73	65.96	66.15	67.06	65.68	64.97	67.06	
2nd place, silver medalist(s)	Philip Milanov	Belgium	64.07	64.46	65.71	64.79	x	63.49	65.71	
3rd place, bronze medalist(s)	Gerd Kanter	Estonia	x	65.27	62.05	x	x	62.76	65.27	SB
4	Christoph Harting	Germany	57.60	62.53	x	62.47	x	65.13	65.13	
5	Daniel Ståhl	Sweden	62.17	64.04	58.44	x	62.53	64.77	64.77	
6	Zoltán Kővágó	Hungary	x	63.27	64.66	x	x	63.13	64.66	
7	Martin Kupper	Estonia	63.22	62.99	63.55	62.00	60.28	62.45	63.55	
8	Daniel Jasinski	Germany	63.00	62.11	63.35	61.87	61.00	63.07	63.35	
9	Robert Urbanek	Poland	61.69	58.93	62.18				62.18	
10	Hannes Kirchler	Italy	57.67	60.18	57.24				60.18	
11	Rutger Smith	Netherlands	57.62	59.99	x				59.99	
12	Lois Maikel Martínez	Spain	57.40	59.17	59.27				59.27	
