= Athletics at the 2013 Summer Universiade – Men's shot put =

The men's shot put event at the 2013 Summer Universiade was held on 7 July.

== Medalists ==
Gold	Silver	Bronze
Aleksandr Lesnoy; Russia	Inderjeet Singh; India	Valeriy Kokoyev; Russia

== Results ==
=== Qualification ===
Qualification: 19.00 m (Q) or at least 12 best (q) qualified for the final.

Rank	Group	Athlete	Nationality	#1	#2	#3	Result	Notes
1	B	Aleksandr Lesnoy	Russia	19.96			19.96	Q
2	A	Valeriy Kokoyev	Russia	18.76	19.84		19.84	Q
3	B	Jacobus Engelbrecht	South Africa	19.20			19.20	Q
4	B	Martin Stašek	Czech Republic	17.55	18.25	19.15	19.15	Q
5	A	Šarūnas Banevičius	Lithuania	18.99	x	18.23	18.99	q
6	B	Hüseyin Atıcı	Turkey	18.36	18.85	18.83	18.85	q
7	A	Inderjeet Singh	India	18.70	18.26	x	18.70	q
8	A	Joseph Kovacs	United States	18.58	x	18.65	18.65	q
9	B	Tomas Soderlund	Finland	17.64	18.34	x	18.34	q
10	B	Derrick Vicars	United States	18.03	18.28	x	18.28	q
11	A	Raymond Brown	Jamaica	18.28	17.13	17.50	18.28	q
12	A	Ronald Julião	Brazil	17.09	17.89	17.64	17.89	q
13	B	Timothy Hendry-Gallagher	Canada	17.81	x	x	17.81	
14	B	Rimantas Martišauskas	Lithuania	17.29	17.57	17.01	17.57	
15	B	Nicolas Martina	Argentina	17.57	x	x	17.57	
16	A	Joaquín Ballivián	Chile	x	17.27	x	17.27	
17	A	Hesham Shalaby	Egypt	—	x	17.20	17.20	
18	A	Adi Aliffudin Bin Hussin	Malaysia	16.16	16.88	16.78	16.88	SB
19	B	Fredrik Simensen	Norway	x	x	14.79	14.79	
20	B	Roman Nikolaev	Kyrgyzstan	11.73	12.35	12.62	12.62	
	A	Timothy Nedow	Canada	x	x	x	NM	
	A	Alexander Rose	Samoa				DNS	
	A	William Sesay	Sierra Leone				DNS	
	B	Goodhope Mwewa	Zambia				DNS	

=== Final ===
Rank	Athlete	Nationality	#1	#2	#3	#4	#5	#6	Result	Notes
1st place, gold medalist(s)	Aleksandr Lesnoy	Russia	19.68	20.30	x	19.99	x	19.78	20.30	
2nd place, silver medalist(s)	Inderjeet Singh	India	18.29	18.39	19.36	x	19.70	x	19.70	PB
3rd place, bronze medalist(s)	Valeriy Kokoyev	Russia	x	19.65	x	x	x	x	19.65	
4	Martin Stašek	Czech Republic	18.91	19.37	19.51	x	x	19.33	19.51	
5	Jacobus Engelbrecht	South Africa	18.79	18.79	19.48	x	19.10	19.09	19.48	
6	Hüseyin Atıcı	Turkey	x	19.34	x	19.04	x	19.05	19.34	
7	Šarūnas Banevičius	Lithuania	18.46	19.22	x	18.46	19.22	x	19.22	
8	Tomas Soderlund	Finland	18.35	x	18.47	x	x	x	18.47	
9	Derrick Vicars	United States	18.01	18.12	18.28				18.28	
10	Raymond Brown	Jamaica	17.90	17.51	18.08				18.08	
11	Ronald Julião	Brazil	16.95	17.20	17.47				17.47	
	Joseph Kovacs	United States	x	x	x				NM	
