= 2015 European Cup Winter Throwing =

2015 European Throwing Cup
- Events: 16

The 2015 European Cup Winter Throwing was held on 14 and 15 March at the Centro Nacional de Lançamentos (National Throws Centre) and Estádio Municipal in Leiria, Portugal. It was the fifteenth edition of the athletics competition for throwing events and was jointly organised by the European Athletic Association and the Federação Portuguesa de Atletismo. The competition featured men's and women's contests in shot put, discus throw, javelin throw and hammer throw. In addition to the senior competitions, there were also under-23 events for younger athletes. Leiria repeated as host, becoming the first place to do so in tournament history.

During the competition the results were provided on a live mode, using Lap2Go technology

== Medal summary ==
=== Senior ===
Men
Event	Gold		Silver		Bronze	
Shot put	Borja Vivas (ESP)	20.15 m	Leif Arrhenius (SWE)	20.09 m	Carlos Tobalina (ESP)	20.04 m
Discus throw	Martin Kupper (EST)	66.67 m	Andrius Gudžius (LTU)	65.51 m	Viktor Butenko (RUS)	65.44 m
Hammer throw	Krisztián Pars (HUN)	79.24 m	Paweł Fajdek (POL)	76.19 m	Serghei Marghiev (MDA)	73.84 m
Javelin throw	Valeriy Iordan (RUS)	83.00 m	Thomas Röhler (GER)	81.83 m	Fatih Avan (TUR)	81.45 m

Women
Event	Gold		Silver		Bronze	
Shot put	Yuliya Leantsiuk (BLR)	18.56 m	Anita Márton (HUN)	17.59 m	Chiara Rosa (ITA)	17.38 m
Discus throw	Nadine Müller (GER)	65.27 m	Mélina Robert-Michon (FRA)	64.75 m	Irina Rodrigues (POR)	63.25 m
Hammer throw	Anna Bulgakova (RUS)	72.06 m	Joanna Fiodorow (POL)	70.90 m	Alexandra Tavernier (FRA)	70.45 m
Javelin throw	Martina Ratej (SLO)	62.43 m	Linda Stahl (GER)	62.12 m	Katharina Molitor (GER)	62.08 m

=== Under-23 ===
Under-23 men
Event	Gold		Silver		Bronze	
Shot put	Mesud Pezer (BIH)	19.44 m	Krzysztof Brzozowski (POL)	19.27 m	Andrei Toader (ROM)	18.96 m
Discus throw	Martin Marković (CRO)	58.75 m	Sebastian Scheffel (GER)	56.93 m	Alin Firfirică (ROM)	56.42 m
Hammer throw	Bence Pásztor (HUN)	72.94 m	Yury Vasilchanka (BLR)	70.02 m	Özkan Baltacı (TUR)	69.07 m
Javelin throw	Matija Muhar (SLO)	77.60 m	Jonas Bonewit (GER)	75.42 m	Aliaksandr Kazlouski (BLR)	73.39 m

Under 23 women
Event	Gold		Silver		Bronze	
Shot put	Emel Dereli (TUR)	17.45 m	Natalya Troneva (RUS)	16.81 m	Viktoryia Kolb (BLR)	16.46 m
Discus throw	Kristin Pudenz (GER)	56.62 m	Karolina Makul (POL)	56.04 m	Veronika Domjan (SLO)	54.46 m
Hammer throw	Alena Sobaleva (BLR)	69.95 m	Alyona Shamotina (UKR)	68.96 m	Alexia Sedykh (FRA)	68.79 m
Javelin throw	Christin Hussong (GER)	60.91 m	Yekaterina Starygina (RUS)	56.15 m	Marcelina Witek (POL)	54.25 m

== Medal and points table ==
Key

The host country is highlighted in lavender blue

Nation	Men points	Women points	Men U23 points	Women U23 points
Russia	4438	4189	3890	3963
Italy	4175	4055	3576	—N/a
Estonia	4143	3570	3332	—N/a
Spain	4123	—N/a	3826	3500
Ukraine	4120	3880	3817	3762
Portugal	3936	—N/a	—N/a	—N/a
Germany	—N/a	4339	3946	3957
France	—N/a	4221	—N/a	3631
Belarus	—N/a	4054	—N/a	—N/a
Czech Republic	—N/a	3960	—N/a	—N/a
Poland	—N/a	—N/a	4030	3926
Sweden	—N/a	—N/a	3708	—N/a
Turkey	—N/a	—N/a	—N/a	3659
