= Philip Milanov =

Belgian discus thrower

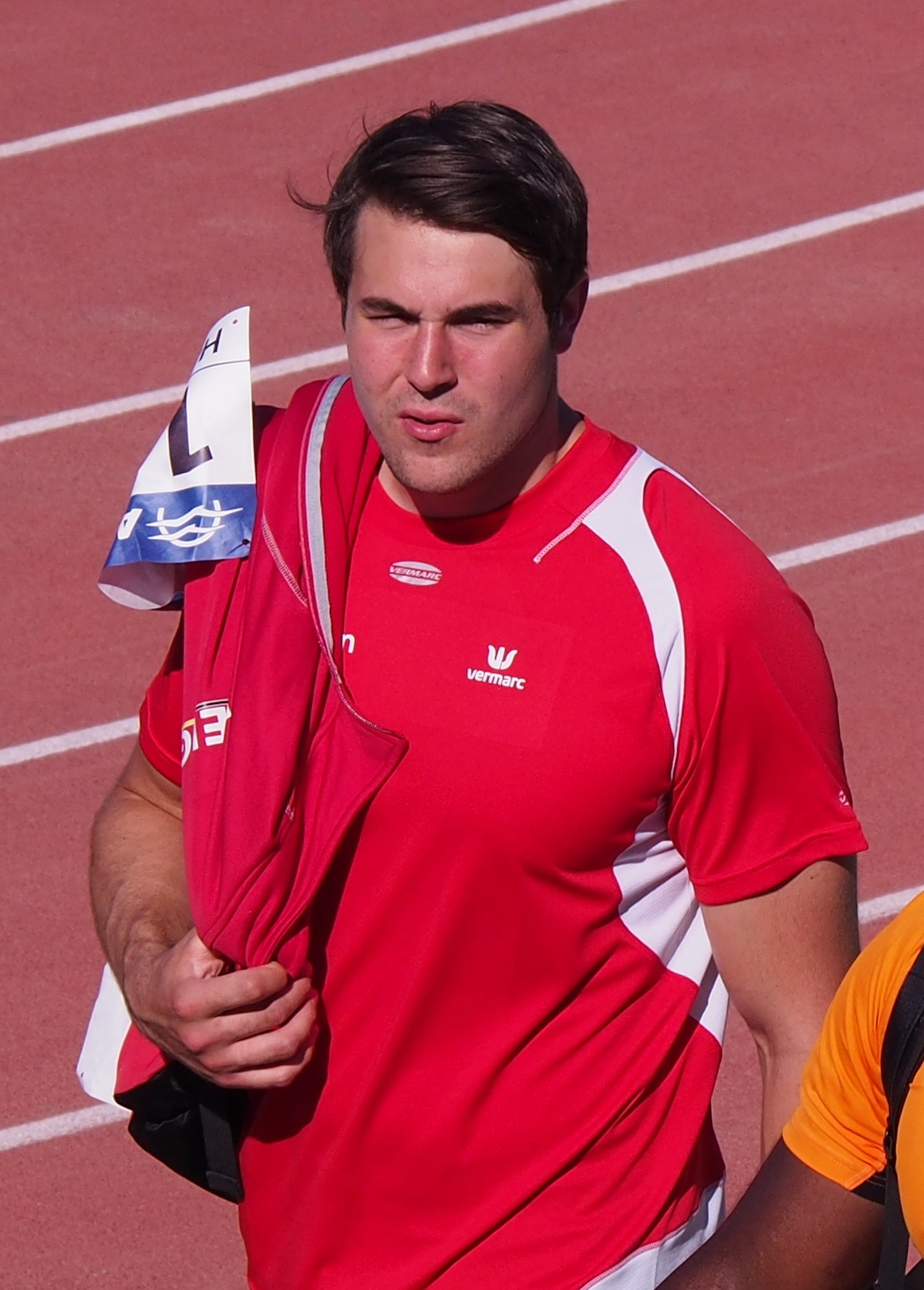
- Philip Milanov during 2015 European Team Championships First League

Personal information
- Born: 6 July 1991 (age 35) Bruges, Belgium
- Height: 1.98 m (6 ft 6 in)
- Weight: 120 kg (265 lb)

Sport
- Country: Belgium
- Sport: Athletics
- Event: Discus throw
- Coached by: Emil Milanov

Achievements and titles
- Personal best: Discus throw: 67.26 (2016)
Medal record
World Championships
Silver medal – second place	2015 Beijing	Discus
European Championships
Silver medal – second place	2016 Amsterdam	Discus
Universiade
Gold medal – first place	2015 Gwangju	Discus throw
- Updated on 7 May 2016

Philip Milanov (Bulgarian: Филип Миланов; born 6 July 1991) is a former Belgian discus thrower. He is a fifteen-time Belgian champion and the 2015 World University Games champion in men's discus throw and an eight-time Belgian champion in men's shot put. In 2015, he became the first ever Belgian athlete, male or female, to win a gold or silver medal at a World Athletics Championships by taking silver at the 2015 World Championships in Athletics in Beijing, China.

== Biography ==
Milanov was born in Bruges, Belgium on 6 July 1991. His father and coach, Emil Milanov, was himself a discus thrower in his native Bulgaria before moving to Belgium in 1989. Philip Milanov won the Belgian junior championship in 2010 with a throw of 54.28 m (1.75 kg), ranking him fourth on the Belgian all-time junior list. In 2011 he represented Belgium at the European Team Championships First League, placing ninth with 54.88 m; at that summer's Belgian championships he was second to Maarten Persoon of the Netherlands but the top Belgian, winning his first national senior title. He repeated as Belgian champion in 2012.

Milanov broke 60 metres for the first time in 2013, setting a Belgian under-23 record of 61.81 m in Vilvoorde and placing fifth at the European U23 Championships in Tampere. He continued to improve in 2014, breaking Jo Van Daele's old Belgian record (64.24 m) by eight centimetres in Lille on 23 February and improving the record further to 66.02 m at the FBK Games in Hengelo on 8 June; he was Belgian champion for the fourth consecutive year (60.57 m) and made his debut in the IAAF Diamond League. Milanov was eliminated in the qualification round at the 2014 European Championships in Zürich; Track & Field News ranked him ninth in the world that year, his first top 10 ranking.

Milanov broke his own Belgian record again in Kessel-Lo on 25 April 2015, throwing 66.43 m and meeting the qualification standard for the 2015 World Championships in Beijing. In July 2015 he won gold with 64.15 m at the World University Games in Gwangju, South Korea. He scored his first Diamond League victory two weeks later at the London Grand Prix; in rainy conditions, he threw 65.14 m to defeat a field that included Diamond Race leader Piotr Małachowski of Poland. In August 2015 he broke again his Belgian record and met the qualification standard for the 2016 Olympic Games. On 29 August 2015 at the World Championships in Beijing, where he took silver, Milanov improved his national record to 66.90 m.

Milanov started 2016 well, taking second place in the Doha Diamond League meeting in May, bettering his national record with a throw of 67.26 m. In July, he won a silver medal at the 2016 European Athletics Championships in Amsterdam, The Netherlands with a throw of 65.71 m, outperformed only by the world discus champion Piotr Malachowski. Milanov entered the 2016 Summer Olympics in Rio de Janeiro, Brazil with high hopes, coming in to the Olympics as 3rd best performer of the season. He qualified as 12th, finishing in 9th place, with a best throw of 62.22 m., more than 5 m below his season best. Rio proved to be a turning point in his career. In 2017, he did not qualify for the final of the men's discus throw competition at the 2017 World Championships in Athletics in London ending in 14th place in the qualification round with a throw of 63.16 m.

After missing the 2018 European Athletics Championships in Berlin, Germany due to an injury, Milanov went on to compete at the 2019 World Athletics Championships, 2022 European Athletics Championships, 2022 World Athletics Championships, 2023 World Athletics Championships, 2024 European Athletics Championships, and 2024 Summer Olympics, reaching the qualification stage at each event.

Milanov announced his retirement from the sport in August 2025.
