= Athletics at the 2011 Summer Universiade – Men's discus throw =

The men's discus throw event at the 2011 Summer Universiade was held on 19–21 August.

== Medalists ==
Gold	Silver	Bronze
Märt Israel; Estonia	Przemysław Czajkowski; Poland	Ronald Julião; Brazil

== Results ==
=== Qualification ===
Qualification: 59.50 m (Q) or at least 12 best (q) qualified for the final.

Rank	Group	Athlete	Nationality	#1	#2	#3	Result	Notes
1	B	Märt Israel	Estonia	57.72	61.26		61.26	Q
2	A	Przemysław Czajkowski	Poland	60.80			60.80	Q
3	B	Robert Urbanek	Poland	x	60.55		60.55	Q
4	B	Ronald Julião	Brazil	54.62	60.16		60.16	Q
5	B	Apostolos Parellis	Cyprus	59.37	59.67		59.67	Q
6	B	Péter Savanyú	Hungary	59.67			59.67	Q
7	B	Mykyta Nesterenko	Ukraine	57.79	57.83	59.01	59.01	q
8	A	Mason Finley	United States	56.24	x	58.31	58.31	q
9	A	Giovanni Faloci	Italy	56.42	57.99	56.26	57.99	q
10	A	Mario Cota	Mexico	53.90	57.55	x	57.55	q
11	A	Daniel Jasinski	Germany	57.11	56.63	x	57.11	q
12	A	Mihai Grasu	Romania	53.36	56.37	56.61	56.61	q
13	B	Andrius Gudžius	Lithuania	55.48	55.67	56.59	56.59	
14	B	Federico Apollini	Italy	54.58	55.45	54.66	55.45	
15	A	Orestis Antoniades	Cyprus	54.53	54.06	x	54.53	
16	A	Pedro Cuesta	Spain	54.05	53.45	x	54.05	
17	A	Priidu Niit	Estonia	53.89	x	x	53.89	
18	A	Martin Stašek	Czech Republic	x	52.95	x	52.95	
19	B	Kirpal Singh Batth	India	50.32	51.82	50.14	51.82	PB
20	B	Tadej Hribar	Slovenia	50.01	x	50.73	50.73	
21	B	O'Dayne Richards	Jamaica	x	x	47.46	47.46	
22	A	Abdullah Alawi Alibrahim	Saudi Arabia	37.10	38.64	x	38.64	

=== Final ===
Rank	Athlete	Nationality	#1	#2	#3	#4	#5	#6	Result	Notes
1st place, gold medalist(s)	Märt Israel	Estonia	57.68	x	61.20	64.07	x	x	64.07	
2nd place, silver medalist(s)	Przemysław Czajkowski	Poland	60.15	63.39	62.04	63.62	x	58.62	63.62	
3rd place, bronze medalist(s)	Ronald Julião	Brazil	60.28	60.50	60.23	63.30	60.70	62.01	63.30	NR
4	Mykyta Nesterenko	Ukraine	60.69	58.69	60.41	x	61.34	62.60	62.60	
5	Robert Urbanek	Poland	60.33	61.77	62.17	59.54	61.00	58.99	62.17	
6	Apostolos Parellis	Cyprus	54.09	61.44	60.62	59.69	60.56	61.11	61.44	SB
7	Giovanni Faloci	Italy	58.16	x	56.32	59.73	x	60.27	60.27	
8	Mason Finley	United States	56.03	58.64	x	x	59.04	59.17	59.17	
9	Daniel Jasinski	Germany	57.96	57.89	56.64				57.96	
10	Mario Cota	Mexico	56.15	x	57.39				57.39	
11	Péter Savanyú	Hungary	x	56.32	56.90				56.90	
12	Mihai Grasu	Romania	55.28	56.28	55.43				56.28	
