= Robert Urbanek =

Polish discus thrower (born 1987)

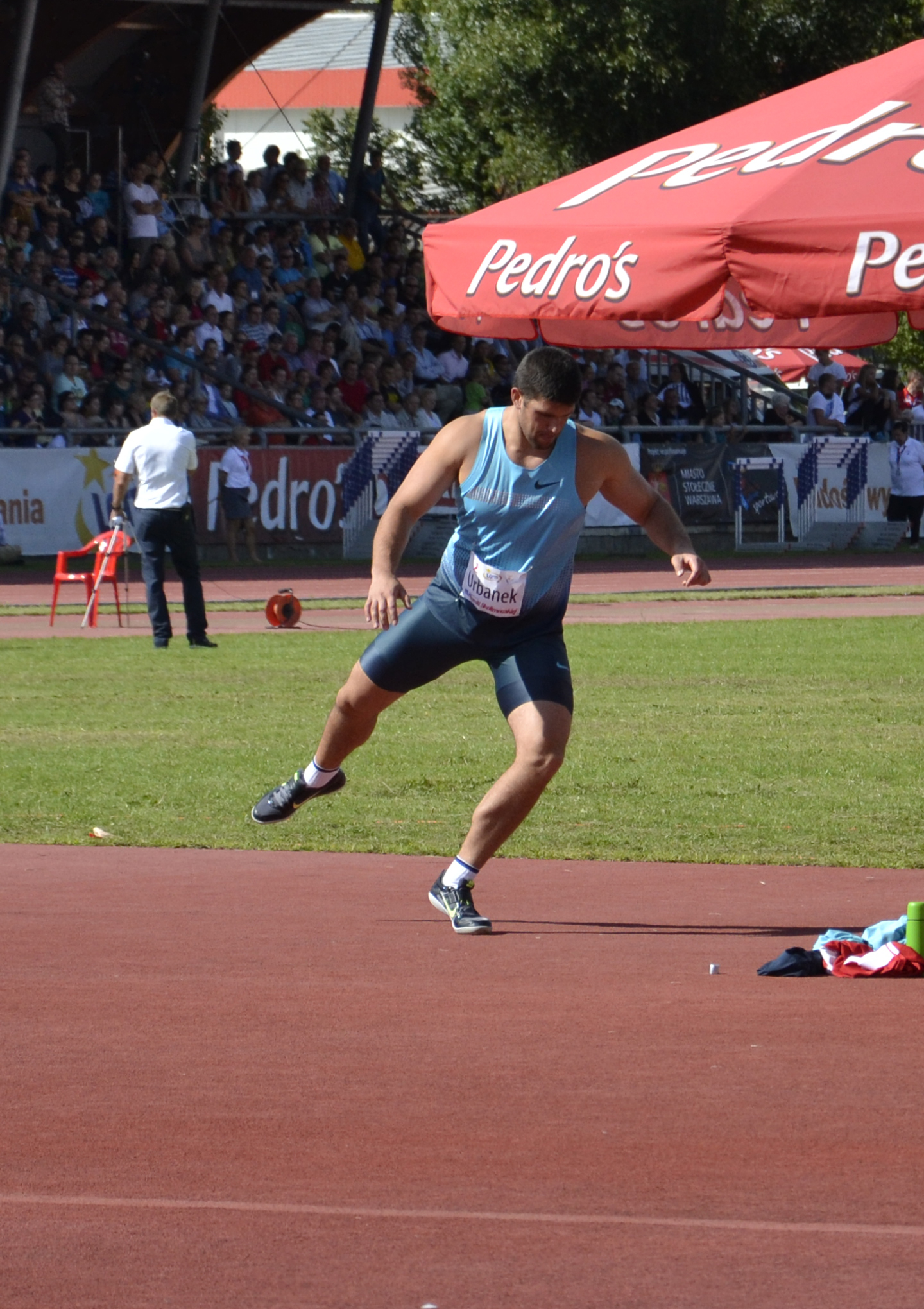
- Urbanek in 2013

Personal information
- Nationality: Polish
- Born: 29 April 1987 (age 39) Łęczyca, Poland
- Height: 1.96 m (6 ft 5 in)
- Weight: 115 kg (254 lb)

Sport
- Sport: Athletics
- Event: Discus throw
- Club: MKS Aleksandrów Łódzki
- Coached by: Witold Suski; Robert Joachimiak; Gerd Kanter (2019–)
Medal record
Men's athletics
Representing Poland
World Championships
Bronze medal – third place	2015 Beijing	Discus
European Championships
Bronze medal – third place	2014 Zürich	Discus
European Team Championships
Gold medal – first place	2015 Cheboksary	Discus
Silver medal – second place	2021 Chorzów	Discus

Robert Urbanek (born 29 April 1987) is a Polish athlete specializing in the discus throw. His personal best in the event is 66.93 meters, achieved in 2012 in Halle.

He competed for Poland at the 2012 Summer Olympics, failing to qualify for the final. His biggest achievement to date is the bronze medal at the 2015 World Championships in Beijing.

== Competition record ==
Year	Competition	Venue	Position	Notes
Representing Poland
2009	European U23 Championships	Kaunas, Lithuania	7th	57.38 m
2011	Universiade	Shenzhen, China	5th	62.17 m
2012	European Championships	Helsinki, Finland	6th	62.99 m
2012	Olympic Games	London, United Kingdom	32nd (q)	59.56 m
2013	World Championships	Moscow, Russia	6th	64.32 m
2014	European Championships	Zürich, Switzerland	3rd	63.81 m
2015	World Championships	Beijing, China	3rd	65.18 m
2016	European Championships	Amsterdam, Netherlands	9th	62.18 m
2016	Olympic Games	Rio de Janeiro, Brazil	17th (q)	61.76 m
2017	World Championships	London, United Kingdom	7th	64.15 m
2018	European Championships	Berlin, Germany	14th (q)	62.00 m
2019	World Championships	Doha, Qatar	23rd (q)	61.78 m
2022	European Championships	Munich, Germany	17th (q)	60.47 m
2023	World Championships	Budapest, Hungary	28th (q)	61.30 m
2024	European Championships	Rome, Italy	20th (q)	60.75 m

== Progression ==
- 2006 – 50.84
- 2007 – 56.18
- 2008 – 62.22
- 2009 – 60.54
- 2010 – 60.74
- 2011 – 64.37
- 2012 – 66.93
- 2013 – 65.30
- 2014 – 65.75
- 2015 – 66.31
- 2016 – 65.56
- 2017 – 66.73
- 2018 – 65.15
- 2019 – 65.81
