= Mario Cota =

Mexican athlete

Personal information
- Full name: Mario Cota Castro
- Nickname: "Bebé"
- Born: September 11, 1990 (age 35) Mexicali, Baja California, Mexico
- Education: Universidad Autónoma de Nuevo León
- Height: 2.00 m (6 ft 7 in)
- Weight: 140 kg (309 lb)

Sport
- Country: Mexico
- Sport: Athletics
- Event: Discus throw
- Updated on 24 January 2015

Mario "Bebe" Cota Castro (born 11 September 1990 in Mexicali) is a Mexican track and field athlete specialising in the shot put and discus throw. He won multiple medals on continental level.

== Personal bests ==
He has personal bests of 19.30 metres in the shot put (Xalapa 2014) and 63.35 metres in the discus (Chula Vista 2016). The latter is the current national record.

Event	Result	Venue	Date
Shot put	19.30 m	Xalapa, Mexico	25 Nov 2014
Discus throw	63.35 m	Chula Vista, California, United States	18 June 2016

== Competition record ==
Year	Competition	Venue	Position	Event	Notes
Representing Mexico
2008	World Junior Championships	Bydgoszcz, Poland	26th (q)	Shot put (6 kg)	17.68 m
2008	World Junior Championships	Bydgoszcz, Poland	26th (q)	Discus (1.75 kg)	49.43 m
2009	Pan American Junior Championships	Port of Spain, Trinidad	7th	Shot put (6 kg)	18.10 m
2009	Pan American Junior Championships	Port of Spain, Trinidad	5th	Discus (1.75 kg)	55.28 m
2010	Ibero-American Championships	San Fernando, Spain	8th	Shot put	17.87 m
2010	Ibero-American Championships	San Fernando, Spain	7th	Discus throw	55.35 m
2010	NACAC U23 Championships	Miramar, United States	5th	Shot put	17.61 m
2010	NACAC U23 Championships	Miramar, United States	2nd	Discus throw	58.01 m
2010	Central American and Caribbean Games	Mayagüez, Puerto Rico	4th	Shot put	18.36 m
2010	Central American and Caribbean Games	Mayagüez, Puerto Rico	3rd	Discus throw	54.70 m
2011	Central American and Caribbean Championships	Mayagüez, Puerto Rico	5th	Shot put	16.52 m
2011	Central American and Caribbean Championships	Mayagüez, Puerto Rico	2nd	Discus throw	58.80 m
2011	Universiade	Shenzhen, China	10th	Discus throw	57.39 m
2011	Pan American Games	Guadalajara, Mexico	6th	Discus throw	59.30 m
2012	Ibero-American Championships	Barquisimeto, Venezuela	4th	Discus throw	58.89 m
2012	NACAC U23 Championships	Irapuato, Mexico	5th	Discus throw	56.02 m
2013	Central American and Caribbean Championships	Morelia, Mexico	3rd	Shot put	17.67 m
2013	Central American and Caribbean Championships	Morelia, Mexico	2nd	Discus throw	58.58 m
2014	Ibero-American Championships	São Paulo, Brazil	7th	Discus throw	56.80 m
2014	Pan American Sports Festival	Mexico City, Mexico	4th	Discus	57.64m A
2014	Central American and Caribbean Games	Veracruz, Mexico	1st	Shot put	19.30 m
2014	Central American and Caribbean Games	Veracruz, Mexico	3rd	Discus throw	58.21 m
2015	NACAC Championships	San José, Costa Rica	8th	Shot put	17.21 m
2015	NACAC Championships	San José, Costa Rica	5th	Discus throw	54.76 m
2015	Pan American Games	Toronto, Canada	11th	Shot put	17.53 m
2015	Pan American Games	Toronto, Canada	8th	Discus throw	59.89 m
2017	Universiade	Taipei, Taiwan	4th	Discus throw	60.07 m
2018	Central American and Caribbean Games	Barranquilla, Colombia	5th	Shot put	19.34 m
2018	Central American and Caribbean Games	Barranquilla, Colombia	4th	Discus throw	60.79 m
