= Axel Härstedt =

Swedish discus thrower

Personal information
- Full name: Karl Axel Härstedt
- Born: 28 February 1987 (age 39) Täby, Sweden
- Height: 1.97 m (6 ft 6 in)
- Weight: 135 kg (298 lb)

Sport
- Country: Sweden
- Sport: Athletics
- Event: Discus throw
- Club: Malmö AI

Achievements and titles
- Personal best: Discus throw: 66.03 (2016)
- Updated on 29 August 2015

Karl Axel Härstedt (born 28 February 1987) is a Swedish discus thrower. A member of the Swedish track and field team at the 2015 IAAF World Championships and at the 2016 Summer Olympics, he launched his personal best throw of 66.03 m at a national track and field meet in Helsingborg nearly a month before the Games. Härstedt currently trains for Malmö Athletics Club (Swedish: Malmö Allmänna Idrottsförening).

In 2016 Härstedt won the gold medal in the men's discus throw at the European Throwing Cup held in Arad, Romania.

Härstedt competed for Sweden, along with his fellow countryman Daniel Ståhl, in the men's discus throw at the 2016 Summer Olympics in Rio de Janeiro. Nearly a month before his maiden Games, he successfully nailed the IAAF Olympic entry standard (65.00) by over a single metre with a personal best of 66.03 at a national track and field meet in Helsingborg, a vast improvement from his previous mark of 64.72 set in Jönköping one year earlier. Having unexpectedly entered the final round with his only qualifying throw of 63.58, Härstedt unleashed the discus into the field at an initial distance of 54.77, and then extended it powerfully to 62.12 m on the second round. With his next attempt prompting a foul, Härstedt bowed out of the competition in tenth place.

== Competition record ==
Year	Competition	Venue	Position	Event	Notes
Representing Sweden
2005	European Junior Championships	Kaunas, Lithuania	13th (q)	Discus throw (1.75 kg)	48.53 m
2006	World Junior Championships	Beijing, China	14th (q)	Discus throw (1.75 kg)	55.12 m
2007	European U23 Championships	Debrecen, Hungary	14th (q)	Discus throw	53.44 m
2014	European Championships	Zurich, Switzerland	12th	Discus throw	60.01 m
2015	World Championships	Beijing, China	23rd (q)	Discus throw	60.52 m
2016	European Championships	Amsterdam, Netherlands	–	Discus throw	NM
2016	Olympic Games	Rio de Janeiro, Brazil	10th	Discus throw	62.12 m
2018	European Championships	Berlin, Germany	17th (q)	Discus throw	61.19 m
