= 2011 European Athletics U23 Championships – Men's shot put =

The men's shot put at the 2011 European Athletics U23 Championships was held at the Městský stadion on 14 July.

== Medalists ==
Gold	David Storl; Germany (GER)
Silver	Dmytro Savytskyy; Ukraine (UKR)
Bronze	Marin Premeru; Croatia (CRO)

== Schedule ==
Date	Time	Round
14 July 2011	10:00	Qualification
14 July 2011	17:20	Final

== Results ==
=== Qualification ===
Qualification: Qualification Performance 18.30 (Q) or at least 12 best performers advance to the final.

Rank	Group	Athlete	Nationality	#1	#2	#3	Result	Notes
1	A	David Storl	Germany	x	19.71	–	19.71	Q
2	B	Max Bedewitz	Germany	18.60	–	–	18.60	Q, PB
3	A	Hendrik Müller	Germany	18.50	–	–	18.50	Q
3	B	Dmytro Savytskyy	Ukraine	18.50	–	–	18.50	Q, PB
5	B	Marin Premeru	Croatia	17.44	18.30	–	18.30	Q
6	A	Siarhei Bakhar	Belarus	17.91	18.26	17.77	18.26	q
7	B	Martin Stašek	Czech Republic	17.70	18.13	x	18.13	q
8	B	Henri Pakisjärvi	Finland	18.08	x	x	18.08	q
9	A	Patrick Cronie	Netherlands	18.00	17.75	17.78	18.00	q
10	A	Ladislav Prášil	Czech Republic	17.83	17.99	17.78	17.99	q
11	A	Tomas Söderlund	Finland	17.56	17.99	17.79	17.99	q
12	A	Sylwester Zieliński	Poland	17.42	17.66	x	17.66	q
13	B	Marko Špiler	Slovakia	16.75	17.26	17.51	17.51	
14	B	Rosen Karamfilov	Bulgaria	16.23	17.09	17.06	17.09	
15	A	Francisco Belo	Portugal	17.04	x	x	17.04	
16	A	Alexander Zinchenko	Austria	16.25	17.01	16.50	17.01	
17	B	Kenneth Mertz	Denmark	16.90	x	x	16.90	
18	B	José Javier Ortega	Spain	15.39	15.68	16.07	16.07	
19	B	Artūras Gurklys	Lithuania	15.98	x	x	15.98	

=== Final ===
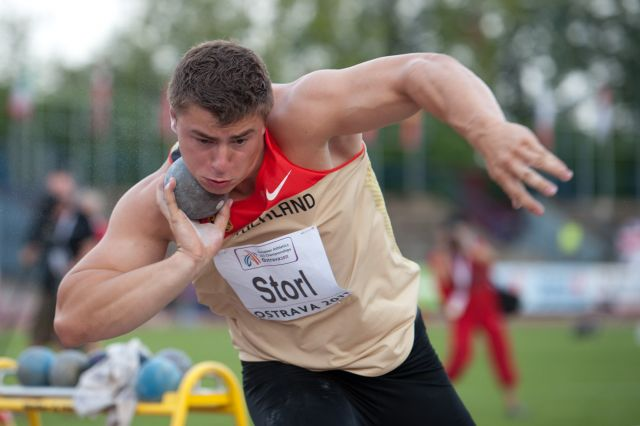
Gold medal winner, David Storl

Rank	Athlete	Nationality	#1	#2	#3	#4	#5	#6	Result	Notes
1st place, gold medalist(s)	David Storl	Germany	x	x	19.79	x	20.45	x	20.45	CR
2nd place, silver medalist(s)	Dmytro Savytskyy	Ukraine	18.57	x	x	18.73	19.18	18.72	19.18	PB
3rd place, bronze medalist(s)	Marin Premeru	Croatia	18.83	x	x	18.46	18.65	x	18.83	
4	Martin Stašek	Czech Republic	17.71	18.34	18.43	x	18.31	x	18.43	
5	Ladislav Prášil	Czech Republic	x	17.64	18.41	18.33	x	18.34	18.41	PB
6	Patrick Cronie	Netherlands	18.38	x	18.32	x	18.27	x	18.38	PB
7	Hendrik Müller	Germany	18.06	x	18.37	x	18.19	x	18.37	
8	Siarhei Bakhar	Belarus	18.28	17.93	17.93	18.19	18.29	x	18.29	PB
9	Henri Pakisjärvi	Finland	18.12	x	18.14	–	–	–	18.14	
10	Max Bedewitz	Germany	17.80	x	17.78	–	–	–	17.80	
11	Tomas Söderlund	Finland	17.79	x	x	–	–	–	17.79	
12	Sylwester Zieliński	Poland	17.29	x	17.11	–	–	–	17.29	

== Participation ==
According to an unofficial count, 19 athletes from 15 countries participated in the event.

- Austria (1)
- Belarus (1)
- Bulgaria (1)
- Croatia (1)
- Czech Republic (2)
- Denmark (1)
- Finland (2)
- Germany (3)
- Lithuania (1)
- Netherlands (1)
- Poland (1)
- Portugal (1)
- Slovenia (1)
- Spain (1)
- Ukraine (1)
