= Erik Cadée =

Dutch discus thrower

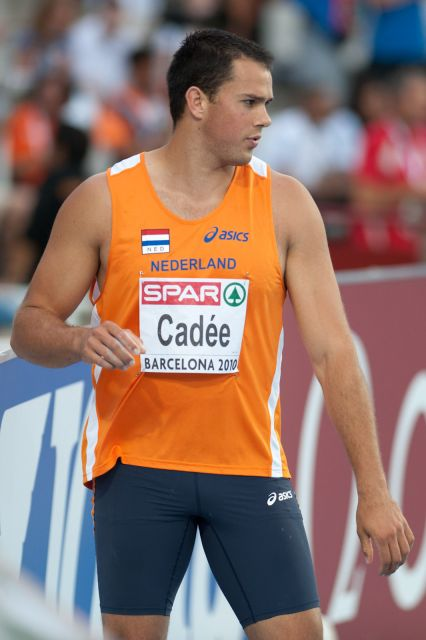
- Cadée at the 2010 European Athletics Championships

Personal information
- Born: 15 February 1984 (age 42) 's-Hertogenbosch
- Height: 2.01 m (6 ft 7 in)
- Weight: 120 kg (265 lb)

Sport
- Country: Netherlands
- Sport: Athletics
- Event: Discus
- Updated on 12 August 2012

Erik Cadée (born 15 February 1984) is a Dutch discus thrower.

Cadée was born in 's-Hertogenbosch. Among his first international appearances was a runner-up performance at the 2001 European Youth Olympic Festival. He competed in the qualifying rounds of the 2002 World Junior Championships in Athletics and improved the following year to claim the gold medal at the 2003 European Athletics Junior Championships. Cadée represented the Netherlands at the World Championships in Athletics in 2007 and 2009, but did not reach the final. He qualified for the final at the 2010 European Athletics Championships, but failed to record a legal throw in his three attempts.

He won the silver medal at the 2011 European Cup Winter Throwing meet in March, and set a then personal best and world leading throw the following month, throwing the discus to a mark of 66.95 m. His present personal best is 67.30 m.

== Achievements ==
Year	Competition	Venue	Position	Event	Notes
Representing Netherlands
2002	World Junior Championships	Kingston, Jamaica	22nd (q)	Discus throw (1.75 kg)	52.95 m
2003	European Junior Championships	Tampere, Finland	1st	Discus throw (1.75 kg)	60.42 m
2005	European U23 Championships	Erfurt, Germany	5th	Discus throw	59.45 m
2007	World Championships	Osaka, Japan	23rd (q)	Discus throw	59.98 m
2009	World Championships	Berlin, Germany	19th (q)	Discus throw	60.64 m
2010	European Championships	Barcelona, Spain	–	Discus throw	NM
2011	World Championships	Daegu, South Korea	20th (q)	Discus throw	61.62 m
2012	European Championships	Helsinki, Finland	10th	Discus throw	60.58 m
2012	Olympic Games	London, United Kingdom	10th	Discus throw	62.78 m
2013	World Championships	Moscow, Russia	14th (q)	Discus throw	62.14 m
2014	European Championships	Zürich, Switzerland	13th (q)	Discus throw	61.18 m
2016	European Championships	Amsterdam, Netherlands	17th (q)	Discus throw	61.93 m
2017	World Championships	London, United Kingdom	25th (q)	Discus throw	58.90 m
2018	European Championships	Berlin, Germany	22nd (q)	Discus throw	57.97 m
