= 2015 World Championships in Athletics – Men's discus throw =

Men's discus throw at the 2015 World Championships
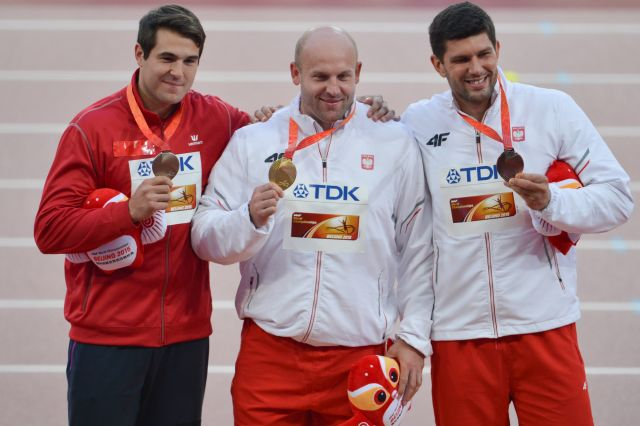
- Discus medalists L-R Milanov, Małachowski, Urbanek
- Venue: Beijing National Stadium
- Dates: 27 August (qualification); 29 August (final)
- Competitors: 31 from 20 nations
- Winning distance: 67.40

Medalists
gold medal	Piotr Małachowski	Poland
silver medal	Philip Milanov	Belgium
bronze medal	Robert Urbanek	Poland

The men's discus throw at the 2015 World Championships in Athletics was held at the Beijing National Stadium on 27 and 29 August.

Three time defending champion Robert Harting is not competing due to knee surgery. This opens opportunities for others. Returning silver medalist Piotr Małachowski is the world leader hoping to move up a notch. In the trials, it took Fedrick Dacres one toss to make an automatic qualifier; Małachowski took three attempts to do so, yet no other competitors were able to throw automatic qualifiers.

In the finals, Małachowski took the lead on the second throw of the competition with a 65.09, the next thrower was Dacres who put out a 64.22. Later in the round, 36-year-old Gerd Kanter threw 64.82 to take over second. In the second round Małachowski solidified his lead by throwing 67.40 which turned out to be the gold medal-winning throw. Three throws later Apostolos Parellis threw 64.55 to take over third. In the third round, Philip Milanov popped a 66.90 Belgian National Record to take over second place. There were no other fireworks until the fifth round when Małachowski's Polish teammate, Robert Urbanek got off a 65.18 to claim the bronze medal.

== Records ==
Prior to the competition, the records were as follows:

World record	Jürgen Schult (GDR)	74.08	Neubrandenburg, East Germany	6 June 1986
Championship record	Virgilijus Alekna (LTU)	70.17	Helsinki, Finland	7 August 2005
World leading	Piotr Małachowski (POL)	68.29	Cetniewo, Poland	1 August 2015
African record	Frantz Kruger (RSA)	70.32	Salon-de-Provence, France	26 May 2002
Asian record	Ehsan Haddadi (IRI)	69.32	Tallinn, Estonia	3 June 2008
North, Central American and Caribbean record	Ben Plucknett (USA)	72.34	Stockholm, Sweden	7 July 1981
South American record	Jorge Balliengo (ARG)	66.32	Rosario, Argentina	15 April 2006
European record	Jürgen Schult (GDR)	74.08	Neubrandenburg, East Germany	6 June 1986
Oceanian record	Benn Harradine (AUS)	68.20	Townsville, Australia	10 May 2013

== Qualification standards ==
Entry standards
65.00

== Schedule ==
Date	Time	Round
27 August 2015	09:30	Qualification
29 August 2015	19:40	Final

All times are local times (UTC+8)

== Results ==
=== Qualification ===
Qualification: 65.00 m (Q) and at least 12 best (q) advanced to the final.

Rank	Group	Name	Nationality	# 1	# 2	# 3	Mark	Notes
1	A	Fedrick Dacres	Jamaica	65.77			65.77	Q
2	A	Piotr Małachowski	Poland	x	59.08	65.59	65.59	Q
3	B	Gerd Kanter	Estonia	x	64.78	61.94	64.78	q
4	A	Apostolos Parellis	Cyprus	63.93	64.41	63.25	64.41	q
5	B	Robert Urbanek	Poland	62.97	64.23	x	64.23	q
6	B	Christoph Harting	Germany	64.23	–	–	64.23	q
7	A	Vikas Gowda	India	63.86	63.84	x	63.86	q
8	A	Philip Milanov	Belgium	x	62.20	63.85	63.85	q
9	A	Daniel Ståhl	Sweden	62.66	61.22	62.06	62.66	q
10	A	Julian Wruck	Australia	60.84	60.80	62.63	62.63	q
11	B	Mauricio Ortega	Colombia	58.81	x	62.54	62.54	q
12	B	Benn Harradine	Australia	60.75	62.48	x	62.48	q
13	A	Victor Hogan	South Africa	62.41	x	62.33	62.41	
14	A	Andrius Gudžius	Lithuania	59.64	58.25	62.22	62.22	
15	B	Daniel Jasinski	Germany	57.65	61.53	61.70	61.70	
16	A	Martin Kupper	Estonia	60.23	61.59	59.98	61.59	
17	B	Chad Wright	Jamaica	60.78	61.53	61.23	61.53	
18	A	Zoltán Kővágó	Hungary	56.19	x	61.37	61.37	
19	A	Martin Wierig	Germany	61.35	x	x	61.35	
20	A	Lukas Weißhaidinger	Austria	60.68	61.26	60.62	61.26	
21	A	Ronald Julião	Brazil	61.02	59.71	59.28	61.02	
22	B	Jason Morgan	Jamaica	60.85	60.81	60.02	60.85	
23	B	Axel Härstedt	Sweden	60.52	x	x	60.52	
24	B	Ehsan Haddadi	Iran	60.39	x	x	60.39	
25	B	Alex Rose	Samoa	57.78	59.07	x	59.07	
26	B	Russell Winger	United States	56.08	53.16	58.69	58.69	
27	B	Essa Al-Zenkawi	Kuwait	58.44	58.68	57.64	58.68	
28	B	Lois Maikel Martínez	Spain	58.01	57.91	x	58.01	
29	B	Jared Schuurmans	United States	55.95	57.71	57.74	57.74	
30	B	Gerhard Mayer	Austria	x	57.73	x	57.73	
	A	Rodney Brown	United States	x	x	x	NM	

=== Final ===
The final was started at 19:50

Rank	Name	Nationality	# 1	# 2	# 3	# 4	# 5	# 6	Mark	Notes
1st place, gold medalist(s)	Piotr Małachowski	Poland	65.09	67.40	62.04	64.40	64.59	64.84	67.40	
2nd place, silver medalist(s)	Philip Milanov	Belgium	60.06	64.38	66.90	x	62.32	65.67	66.90	NR
3rd place, bronze medalist(s)	Robert Urbanek	Poland	60.47	61.58	64.14	64.62	65.18	x	65.18	
4	Gerd Kanter	Estonia	64.82	63.52	63.95	64.01	64.65	x	64.82	
5	Daniel Ståhl	Sweden	61.74	60.42	64.42	64.73	x	x	64.73	SB
6	Apostolos Parellis	Cyprus	63.20	64.55	63.63	63.46	64.39	62.66	64.55	
7	Fedrick Dacres	Jamaica	64.22	59.80	x	62.74	61.73	x	64.22	
8	Christoph Harting	Germany	63.94	63.55	x	x	x	x	63.94	
9	Vikas Gowda	India	60.28	x	62.24				62.24	
10	Benn Harradine	Australia	58.15	x	62.05				62.05	
11	Mauricio Ortega	Colombia	13.10	x	62.01				62.01	
12	Julian Wruck	Australia	59.74	60.01	56.78				60.01	
