= Martin Stašek =

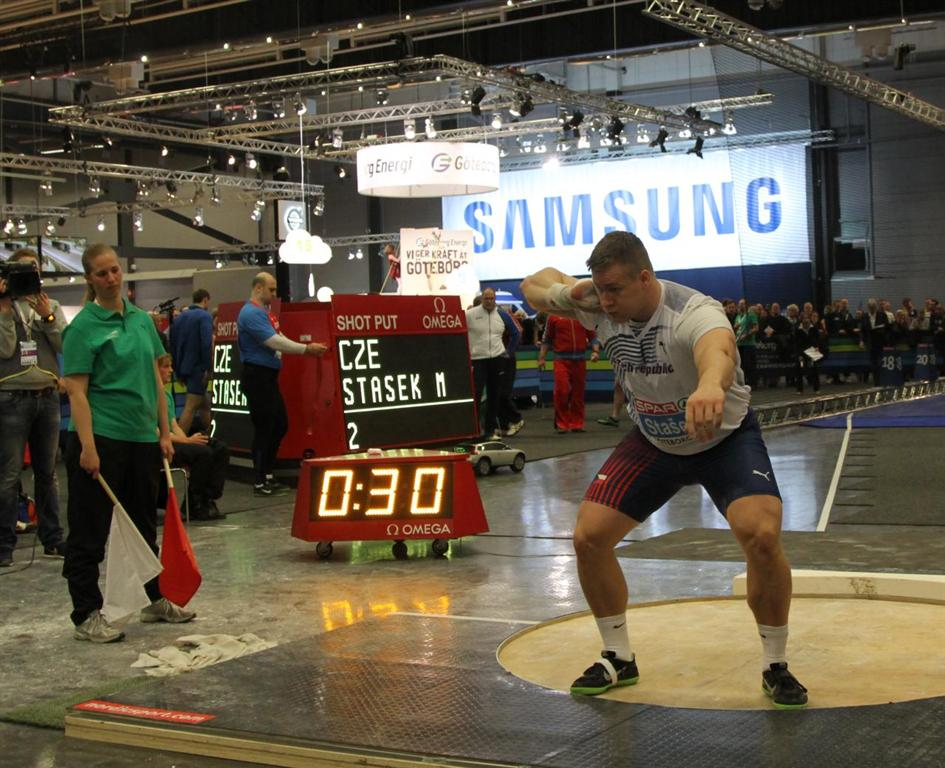

Martin Stašek (born 8 April 1989 in Zlín) is a Czech athlete competing primarily in the shot put. He represented his country at the 2013 World Championships finishing twelfth in the final.

His personal best in the event is 20.98 metres, set in 2013.

== Competition record ==
| Year | Competition | Venue | Position | Event | Notes |
Representing the Czech Republic
| 2009 | European U23 Championships | Kaunas, Lithuania | 24th (q) | Discus | 49.61 m |
| 2011 | European U23 Championships | Ostrava, Czech Republic | 4th | Shot put | 18.43 m |
| 2011 | European U23 Championships | Ostrava, Czech Republic | 24th (q) | Discus | 51.97 m |
| 2011 | Universiade | Shenzhen, China | 13th (q) | Shot put | 17.52 m |
| 2011 | Universiade | Shenzhen, China | 18th (q) | Discus throw | 52.95 m |
| 2013 | European Indoor Championships | Gothenburg, Sweden | 18th (q) | Shot put | 18.96 m |
| 2013 | Universiade | Kazan, Russia | 4th | Shot put | 19.51 m |
| 2013 | World Championships | Moscow, Russia | 12th | Shot put | 19.10 m |
| 2016 | European Championships | Amsterdam, Netherlands | 27th (q) | Shot put | 18.32 m |

== Personal bests ==
Outdoor

- Shot put – 20.98 (Chodov 2013)
- Discus throw – 57.42 (2012)

Indoor

- Shot put – 20.73 (Prague 2013)
