= Mykyta Nesterenko =

Ukrainian discus thrower (born 1991)

Personal information
- Native name: Микита Нестеренко
- Born: April 15, 1991 (age 35)
- Height: 2.09 m (6 ft 10 1/2 in)
- Weight: 110 kg (243 lb)

Sport
- Country: Ukraine
- Sport: Athletics
- Event: Discus
- Updated on 12 August 2012

Mykyta Nesterenko (born 15 April 1991) is a Ukrainian discus thrower, born in Dnipro.

== Career ==
His personal best throw with the 2 kilogram implement is 66.42 metres, achieved in June 2021 in Lutsk. With the junior discus (1.750 kg) he has a best of 70.13 metres, achieved in May 2008 in Halle, Saxony-Anhalt. This is the current junior world record. With the 1.500 kg discus he also holds the world youth best with a distance of 77.50 metres, established in Kyiv on May 19, 2008.

Nesterenko has personal bests in the shot put of 22.44 metres in 2008 with the 5 kilogram weight and 18.97 metres (indoors) with the senior weight in 2009.

== Achievements ==
Year	Competition	Venue	Position	Event	Notes
Representing Ukraine
2007	World Youth Championships	Ostrava, Czech Republic	11th	Shot put (5 kg)	17.52 m
2007	World Youth Championships	Ostrava, Czech Republic	1st	Discus (1.5 kg)	68.54 m
2008	World Junior Championships	Bydgoszcz, Poland	3rd	Discus (1.75 kg)	61.01 m
2010	World Junior Championships	Moncton, Canada	4th	Discus (1.75 kg)	60.54 m
2011	European U23 Championships	Ostrava, Czech Republic	2nd	Discus	59.67 m
2011	Universiade	Shenzhen, China	4th	Discus	62.60 m
2012	European Championships	Helsinki, Finland	16th	Discus	61.21 m
2012	Olympic Games	London, United Kingdom	34th	Discus	59.17 m
2013	European Team Championships	Gateshead, Great Britain	9th	Discus	55.34 m
2013	European U23 Championships	Tampere, Finland	13th (q)	Discus	56.27 m
2016	European Championships	Amsterdam, Netherlands	20th (q)	Discus	61.35 m
2016	Olympic Games	Rio de Janeiro, Brazil	23rd (q)	Discus	60.31 m
2018	European Championships	Berlin, Germany	12th	Discus	57.66 m
2021	Olympic Games	Tokyo, Japan	20th (q)	Discus	60.95 m
2022	European Championships	Munich, Germany	23rd (q)	Discus	57.59 m
