= Brett Morse =

British discus thrower and model (born 1989)

Brett Morse OLY
Personal information
- Nationality: British (Welsh)
- Born: 11 February 1989 (age 37) Penarth, Wales
- Occupations: Professional model, sports performance coach
- Height: 6 ft 3 in (1.91 m)
- Weight: 270 lb (120 kg)

Sport
- Country: Wales; United Kingdom
- Sport: Track and field
- Event: Discus throw
- Club: Birchfield Harriers
- Coached by: Andy Brittan (–2010); Vésteinn Hafsteinsson (2011–2012); Nigel Bevan (2015–)

Achievements and titles
- Personal bests: 66.84m (Welsh record)
Medal record
World Rankings
- 2013: World 8th
- 2011: World #1 (U23)
Championships
- 4-time British Champion

Brett Morse, OLY (born 11 February 1989) is a British professional model, sports performance coach, and former track and field athlete who competed in the discus throw. He represented Great Britain at the 2012 Summer Olympics and is a four-time British champion.

== Biography ==
Born in Penarth, Vale of Glamorgan, Wales, Morse set the British under-20 discus record in 2008 with a mark of 60.46m, which stood for eleven years before being surpassed in 2019. He attended Cardiff Metropolitan University but discontinued his studies to pursue full-time professional modeling, which he described in an interview as an "unexpected calling." He is a member of the Birchfield Harriers athletics club.

== Athletics career ==
Under the guidance of coach Andy Brittan, he became the first Welshman to win the British discus title in 2010. His career drew media attention when he was coached by Vésteinn Hafsteinsson, a partnership that was discussed in national media due to Hafsteinsson's historical competition ban following the 1984 Olympics.

Despite the surrounding discussion, Morse represented Wales at the 2010 Commonwealth Games in Delhi, placing sixth.

In 2011, Morse entered the European Under-23 Championships in Ostrava ranked first in his age category. He recorded no mark in the final. At the 2011 World Championships in Daegu, he advanced to the final and finished 12th.

=== 2012 London Olympics ===
At the 2012 GB Olympic Trials in Birmingham, Morse secured second place with a throw of 62.27m. He was subsequently selected for the Great Britain team for the 2012 Summer Olympics in London, competing at the Olympic Stadium in August 2012.

He finished the year ranked 8th on the World Best list, one of only four British athletes to achieve a top-ten world ranking in their respective disciplines that year.

In recognition of his status as an Olympian, he has since been granted the post-nominal title OLY by the World Olympians Association.

=== Later career and championships ===
Morse continued competing internationally, placing fifth at the 2014 Commonwealth Games in Glasgow. He returned to train with former coach Nigel Bevan in 2015, and secured his fourth British discus championship title in 2018.

== International competitions ==
Year	Competition	Venue	Position	Event	Notes
Representing Great Britain and Wales
2010	Commonwealth Games	Delhi, India	6th	Discus throw	58.91 m
2011	European U23 Championships	Ostrava, Czech Republic	—	Discus throw	NM
2011	World Championships	Daegu, South Korea	12th	Discus throw	62.69 m
2012	Olympic Games	London, United Kingdom	35th (q)	Discus throw	58.18 m
2013	World Championships	Moscow, Russia	23rd (q)	Discus throw	59.23 m
2014	Commonwealth Games	Glasgow, United Kingdom	5th	Discus throw	60.48 m
2018	Commonwealth Games	Gold Coast, Australia	10th	Discus throw	56.70 m

== Post-athletics, modeling, and coaching ==
Following his retirement from elite discus, Morse transitioned into professional modeling, specializing in the "big and tall" and "muscle-fit" sectors. Represented by Bridge Models, he has featured in global campaigns for brands including Levi's, River Island, and Dressmann.

Based in Cardiff, Morse operates as a sports performance coach, utilizing his Olympic background to train athletes in speed and strength development.

== Health and advocacy ==
Morse has spoken publicly regarding his long-term diagnosis of Crohn's disease and his experiences with related depression and anxiety while maintaining a career in elite sports. He has collaborated with organizations like Crohn's & Colitis UK and advocated for increased mental health awareness among elite athletes.

== Personal life ==
Morse resides in Cardiff, Wales, and is an active member of the South Wales athletic and football communities.
