= 2009 Arab Athletics Championships =

16th Arab Athletics Championships
- Dates: 6–9 October
- Host city: Damascus, Syria
- Events: 46
- Participation: 17 nations

The 2009 Arab Athletics Championships was the sixteenth edition of the international athletics competition between Arab countries which took place in Damascus, Syria from 6–9 October.

== Medal summary ==
=== Men ===
Event	Gold		Silver		Bronze	
100 metres (Event was hand-timed)	Aziz Ouhadi (MAR)	9.9h	Mohammed Farhan Khalifa (BHR)	10.0h	Barakat Al-Harthi (OMN)	10.1h
200 metres	Omar Juma Al-Salfa (UAE)	20.84	Idriss Khalid Zougari (MAR)	20.86	Hamed Al-Bishi (KSA)	20.92
400 metres	Rabah Yousif (SUD)	45.15	Mohamed Khouaja (LBA)	45.35	Yousef Masrahi (KSA)	45.93
800 metres	Belal Mansoor Ali (BHR)	1:45.92	Mohammad Al-Azemi (KUW)	1:46.91	Mouhcine El Amine (MAR)	1:46.99
1500 metres	Amine Laâlou (MAR)	3:39.89	Imad Touil (ALG)	3:40.86	Belal Mansoor Ali (BHR)	3:40.89
5000 metres	James Kwalia (QAT)	14:04.22	Hasan Mahboob (BHR)	14:05.23	Alemu Bekele (BHR)	14:06.62
10,000 metres	Hasan Mahboob (BHR)	28:16.01	Nicholas Kemboi (QAT)	28:22.24	Hussain Jamaan Alhamdah (KSA)	29:04.57
110 metres hurdles	Othmane Hadj Lazib (ALG)	13.79	Ahmed Khader Al-Moualed (KSA)	13.92	Aymen Ben Ahmed (TUN)	14.03
400 metres hurdles	Bandar Yahya Sharahili (KSA)	49.43	Idris Abdulkader Al-Housaoui (KSA)	49.56	Mubarak Al-Nubi (QAT)	51.74
3000 metres steeplechase	Tareq Mubarak Taher (BHR)	8:39.47	Chakir Boujattaoui (MAR)	8:40.36	Rabia Makhloufi (ALG)	8:48.95
Half marathon	Nicholas Kemboi (QAT)	1:07:09	Ali Mabrouk El Zaidi (LBA)	1:07:14	Najim El Qady (MAR)	1:07:18
20 km walk	Hassanine Sebei (TUN)	1:29:56	Ali Amrouch (ALG)	1:31:16	Hichem Medjeber (ALG)	1:31:30
4 × 100 m relay	Saudi Arabia (KSA); Yahya Al-Ghahes; Mohamed Ali Al-Fardan; Yasser Al-Nassiri; Ahmed Khader Al-Moualed	40.09	United Arab Emirates (UAE); Omar Jouma Al-Salfa; Bilal Jouma Al-Salfa; Hussain Rustom; Jassem Jouma Sayed	40.19	Oman (OMN); Barakat Al-Harthi; Ahmed Mohamed Al-Merjabi; Fahed Khamis Al-Jabri; Juma Mubarak Al-Jabri	40.37
4 × 400 m relay	Saudi Arabia (KSA); Yousef Masrahi; Hamed Al-Bishi; Bandar Yahya Sharahili; Idris Abdulkader Al-Housaoui	3:06.90	United Arab Emirates (UAE); Jassem Jouma Sayed; Bilal Jouma Al-Salfa; Saoud Ali Abdulkarim; Omar Juma Al-Salfa	3:09.78	Sudan (SUD); Awadelkarim Makki; Hussein; Ismail Ahmed Ismail; Rabah Yousif	3:10.09
High jump	Karim Lotfy (EGY)	2.16 m	Majd Eddin Ghazal (SYR)	2.16 m	Nawaf Ahmad Al-Yami (KSA)	2,00 m
Pole vault	Fahid Bader Al-Mershad (KUW)	5.25 m NR CR	Ali Makki Al-Sabagha (KUW)	5.15 m	Abdelatif Djadoune (ALG)	5.00 m
Long jump	Issam Nima (ALG)	8.10 m	Yahya Berrabah (MAR)	8.09 m	Ahmed Faiz Bin Marzouq (KSA)	7.82 m
Triple jump	Mohamed Youssef Al-Sahabi (BHR)	16.30 m	Mohamed Abdullah Darwish (UAE)	16.15 m	Mourad Benchikh El Hocine (ALG)	16.12 m
Shot put	Sultan Al-Hebshi (KSA)	19.12 m	Meshari Suroor Saad (KUW)	18.81 m	Yasser Ibrahim Farag (EGY)	18.29 m
Discus throw	Omar Ahmed El Ghazaly (EGY)	61.73 m	Haider Naser Abdulshaheed (IRQ)	59.54 m	Yasser Ibrahim Farag (EGY)	59.31 m
Hammer throw	Ali Al-Zinkawi (KUW)	76.46 m	Mohsen El Anany (EGY)	74.31 m	Mohammad Al-Jawhar (KUW)	69.20 m
Javelin throw	Ihab El-Sayed (EGY)	75.49 m	Ammar Makki Al-Najm (IRQ)	74.16 m NR	Ali Saleh Al-Jadani (KSA)	69.44 m
Decathlon	Mohammed J.M. Al-Qaree (KSA)	7642 pts NR	Mourad Souissi (ALG)	7413 pts	Ali Hazer (LIB)	6287 pts

=== Women ===
Event	Gold		Silver		Bronze	
100 metres	Munira Saleh (SYR)	11.93 NR	Jamaa Chnaik (MAR)	11.94	Dana Hussain (IRQ)	11.99 NR
200 metres	Munira Saleh (SYR)	24.25	Gulustan Mahmood (IRQ)	24.49 NR	Jamaa Chnaik (MAR)	25.05
400 metres	Gulustan Mahmood (IRQ)	53.65 NR	Naima Ibrahimi (MAR)	55.53	Nouha El Baklouti (TUN)	57.89
800 metres	Halima Hachlaf (MAR)	2:07.17	Seltana Aït Hammou (MAR)	2:07.38	Mimi Belete (BHR)	2:09.25
1500 metres	Siham Hilali (MAR)	4:12.62	Btissam Lakhouad (MAR)	4:15.24	Mimi Belete (BHR)	4:16.76
5000 metres	Tejitu Daba (BHR)	16:27.66	Shitaye Eshete (BHR)	16:29.74	Bouchra Chaâbi (MAR)	16:30.33
10,000 metres	Tejitu Daba (BHR)	35:42.64	Gladys Cherotich Kibiwot (BHR)	35:53.94	Kenza Dahmani (ALG)	42:02.60
100 metres hurdles	Fatmata Fofanah (BHR)	13.51	Fadoua Al-Boza (SYR)	14.28	Lamiae Lhabze (MAR)	14.39
400 metres hurdles	Hayat Lambarki (MAR)	57.27	Lamiae Lhabze (MAR)	57.86	Jomaa Fayza Omer (SUD)	63.31
3000 metres steeplechase	Hanane Ouhaddou (MAR)	9:57.81	Durka Mana (SUD)	10:14.85	Oulaya Benrebah (ALG)	11:26.68
Half marathon	Kenza Dahmani (ALG)	1:16:36	Samira Raif (MAR)	1:24:23	Hiba Al Wada (SYR) Abla Bendebah (ALG)	1:44:48
10 km walk	Chaima Trabelsi (TUN)	49:09.7	Olfa Lafi (TUN)	49:45.6	Rania Osman (SYR)	50:24.5
4 × 100 m relay	Iraq (IRQ); Bahar Kasrou; Alaa Hikmet Kassem; Dana Hussain; Gulustan Mahmood	47.22 NR	Morocco (MAR); Naima Ibrahimi; Jamaa Chnaik; Lamiae Lhabze; Hayat Lambarki	47.98	Bahrain (BHR); Faten Abdelnabi; Sabrine Youssef; Amer; Fatmata Fofanah	48.77 NR
4 × 400 m relay	Morocco (MAR); Lamiae Lhabze; Hayat Lambarki; Naima Ibrahimi; Halima Hachlaf	3:40.58	Iraq (IRQ); Gulustan Mahmood; Dana Hussain; Souha Khazal; Alaa Hikmet Kassem	3:47.39	Tunisia (TUN); Nouha El Baklouti; Eya El Akhal; Safa Issaoui; Mouna Ben Alaya	3:51.90
High jump	Meryem Ouahbi (MAR)	1.65 m	Rim Abdullah (SYR) Amina Lemgherbi (ALG)	1.60 m	Not awarded	
Pole vault	Nesrin Emam (EGY)	3.80 m NR	Nisrine Dinar (MAR)	3.80 m	Rehame Shiha (SYR) Rouba Al-Faseeh (SYR)	2.90 m NR
Long jump	Yamilé Aldama (SUD)	5.95 m	Inas Mohamed Mansour (EGY)	5.90 m	Jamaa Chnaik (MAR)	5.80 m
Triple jump	Yamilé Aldama (SUD)	13.84 m	Jamaa Chnaik (MAR)	13.38 m	Fadwa Al-Bouza (SYR)	13.01 m NR
Shot put	Sihem Marrakchi (TUN)	14.89 m	Walaa Attia (EGY)	14.12 m	Zouina Bouzebra (ALG)	12.70 m
Discus throw	Hiba Omar (SYR)	43.67 m	Rim Gueyèche (TUN)	43.47 m	Noura Qerish (JOR)	28.51 m
Hammer throw	Marwa Hussein (EGY)	60.48 m	Hayat El Ghazi (MAR)	53.76 m	Fatine Oubourogaa (MAR)	52.98 m
Javelin throw	Hana'a Ramadhan Omar (EGY)	56.09 m NR	Zahra Badrane (ALG)	44.71 m	Sihem Marrakchi (TUN)	41.98 m
Heptathlon	Chaima Fethi Tehema (EGY)	4081 pts	Bahar Kasrou (IRQ)	4026 pts NR	Nour Al-Sous (SYR)	3895 pts

== Medal table ==
=== Overall ===
Rank	Nation	Gold	Silver	Bronze	Total
1	Morocco (MAR)	8	13	7	28
2	Bahrain (BHR)	7	4	5	16
3	Egypt (EGY)	7	3	2	12
4	Saudi Arabia (KSA)	5	2	6	13
5	Algeria (ALG)	3	5	8	16
6	Syria (SYR)	3	3	6	12
7	Tunisia (TUN)	3	2	4	9
8	Sudan (SUD)	3	1	2	6
9	Iraq (IRQ)	2	5	1	8
10	Kuwait (KUW)	2	3	1	6
11	Qatar (QAT)	2	1	1	4
12	United Arab Emirates (UAE)	1	3	0	4
13	Libya (LBA)	0	2	0	2
14	Oman (OMN)	0	0	2	2
15	Jordan (JOR)	0	0	1	1
15	Lebanon (LIB)	0	0	1	1
17	Yemen (YEM)	0	0	0	0
Totals (17 entries)		46	47	47	140

=== Men ===
Rank	Nation	Gold	Silver	Bronze	Total
1	Saudi Arabia (KSA)	5	2	6	13
2	Bahrain (BHR)	4	2	2	8
3	Egypt (EGY)	3	1	2	6
4	Algeria (ALG)	2	3	4	9
5	Morocco (MAR)	2	3	2	7
6	Kuwait (KUW)	2	3	1	6
7	Qatar (QAT)	2	1	1	4
8	United Arab Emirates (UAE)	1	3	0	4
9	Sudan (SUD)	1	0	1	2
9	Tunisia (TUN)	1	0	1	2
11	Iraq (IRQ)	0	2	0	2
11	Libya	0	2	0	2
13	Syria	0	1	0	1
14	Oman (OMN)	0	0	2	2
15	Lebanon (LIB)	0	0	1	1
16	Yemen (YEM)	0	0	0	0
Totals (16 entries)		23	23	23	69

=== Women ===
Rank	Nation	Gold	Silver	Bronze	Total
1	Morocco (MAR)	6	10	5	21
2	Egypt (EGY)	4	2	0	6
3	Syria	3	2	6	11
4	Bahrain (BHR)	3	2	3	8
5	Iraq (IRQ)	2	3	1	6
6	Tunisia (TUN)	2	2	3	7
7	Sudan (SUD)	2	1	1	4
8	Algeria (ALG)	1	2	4	7
9	Jordan (JOR)	0	0	1	1
10	Kuwait (KUW)	0	0	0	0
10	Lebanon (LIB)	0	0	0	0
10	Qatar (QAT)	0	0	0	0
Totals (12 entries)		23	24	24	71
