= 2010 West Asian Athletics Championships =

1st West Asian Athletics Championships
- Dates: 18–20 September
- Host city: Aleppo, Syria

The 2010 West Asian Athletics Championships was the inaugural edition of the international athletics competition organised by the West Asian Athletics Association that took place from 18 to 20 September 2010 in Aleppo, Syria. It was a de facto successor to the athletics competition at the West Asian Games last held in 2005.

== Medal summary ==
=== Men ===
Event	Gold		Silver		Bronze	
100 metres (wind: -0.5 m/s)	Femi Ogunode (QAT)	10.25	Barakat Al-Harthi (OMA)	10.30	Ahmed Al-Zaabi (UAE)	10.58
200 metres (wind: -0.1 m/s)	Femi Ogunode (QAT)	20.92	Omar Juma Al-Salfa (UAE)	21.11	Sajjad Hashemi (IRI)	21.37
400 metres	Sajjad Hashemi (IRI)	46.57	Ali Obaid Shirook (UAE)	46.95	Reza Bouazar (IRI)	47.07
800 metres	Belal Mansoor Ali (BHR)	1:45.44	Sajjad Moradi (IRI)	1:45.76	Adnan Taess Askar (IRQ)	1:46.26 NR
1500 metres	Belal Mansoor Ali (BHR)	3:40.07	Sajjad Moradi (IRI)	3:40.31	Yusuf Saad Kamel (BHR)	3:40.58
5000 metres	Ali Hassan Mahboub (BHR)	14:02.17	Felix Kikwai Kibore (QAT)	14:02.63	Dejene Regassa Mootoma (BHR)	14:02.74
10,000 metres	Ali Hassan Mahboub (BHR)	28:36.14	Felix Kikwai Kibore (QAT)	28:37.97	Bilisuma Shugi (BHR)	28:45.01
Half marathon	Aadam Ismael Khamis (BHR)	1:02:25	Khaled Kamel Yaseen (BHR)	1:02:27	Mohammed Abdu Al-Bekhit (QAT)	1:06:30
110 metres hurdles (wind: +0.3 m/s)	Rouhollah Askari (IRI)	13.78	Fawaz Al-Shammari (KUW)	13.81	Abdelaziz Al-Mandeel (KUW)	14.22
400 metres hurdles	Bandar Yahya Sharahili (KSA)	50.33	Ali Obaid Shirook (UAE)	50.76	Mubarak Al-Nubi (QAT)	51.24
3000 metres steeplechase	Thamer Kamal Ali (QAT)	8:36.60	Zakariya Ali Kamil (QAT)	8:38.20	Tareq Mubarak Taher (BHR)	8:47.64
4 × 100 metres relay	United Arab Emirates; Omar Juma Al-Salfa; Ahmed Al-Zaabi; Bilal Juma Al-Salfa; Khalifa Abdullah Sarwashi	40.07 NR	Kuwait; Eisa Al-Youha; Hamoud Al-Saad; Fawaz Al-Shammari; Abdelaziz Al-Mandeel	40.08	Saudi Arabia; Yahya Hassan Ibrahim; Yasser Al-Nassiri; Mousa Abdou Al-Kam Qarqaran; Ahmed Al-Molad	40.30
4 × 400 metres relay	Saudi Arabia; Yousef Ahmed Masrahi; Ismail Al-Sabiani; Mohammed Ali Al-Bishi; Hamed Hamadan Al-Bishi	3:06.97	Iraq; Jaseem Al-Ayman; Kareem Tareq; Mohamed Hassan Juma; Karar Al-Abodi	3:07.57	Iran; Reza Bouazar; Sajjad Hashemi; Sajjad Moradi; Edvard Mangasar	3:07.87 NR
20 kilometres walk	Mabrook Saleh Nasser Mohamed (QAT)	1:33:36	Ebrahim Rahimian (IRI)	1:35:3	Mohamed Jumaa (SYR); Wisam Ghaybour (SYR)	1:44.1
High jump	Rashid Ahmed Al-Mannai (QAT)	2.25 m	Mutaz Essa Barshim (QAT)	2.21 m	Majed Eldin Ghazal (SYR); Hashim Al-Oqaibi (KSA)	2.18 m
Pole vault	Mohsen Rabbani (IRI)	5.00 m	Ali Makki Al-Sabagha (KUW)	5.00 m	Eshagh Ghaffari (IRI)	4.80 m
Long jump	Mohamed Salman Al-Khuwalidi (KSA)	8.00 m	Hussain Taher Al-Sabee (KSA)	7.91 m	Saleh Abdelaziz Al-Haddad (KUW)	7.83 m
Triple jump	Mohamed Abbas Darwish (UAE)	16.80 m NR	Mohamed Youssef Al-Sahabi (BHR)	16.46 m	Ahmed Abdallah Faraj (KSA)	15.86 m
Shot put	Amin Nikfar (IRI)	19.63 m	Sultan Al-Hebshi (KSA)	18.54 m	Meshari Saad Suroor (KUW)	18.11 m
Discus throw	Mahmoud Samimi (IRI)	64.01 m	Mohammad Samimi (IRI)	62.34 m	Ahmed Mohamed Dheeb (QAT)	62.25 m
Hammer throw	Ali Mohammed Al-Zankawi (KUW)	76.72 m	Kaveh Mousavi (IRI)	69.91 m	Mohammed Abdulkerim Al-Jawhar (KUW)	65.00 m
Javelin throw	Mehdi Ravaei (IRI)	74.74 m	Adel Abdulmajid Al-Suwaid (KUW)	68.67 m	Ammar Mekki Ali (IRQ)	67.88 m
Decathlon	Hadi Sepehrzad (IRI)	6991 pts	Ali Hazer (LIB)	6529 pts	Mohammed Molla Khalaf (SYR)	6218 pts

=== Women ===
Event	Gold		Silver		Bronze	
100 metres (wind: -0.1 m/s)	Gretta Taslakian (LBN)	11.85 NR	Maryam Toosi (IRI)	11.88 NR	Dana Abdul Razak Hussein (IRQ)	12.08
200 metres (wind: +1.6 m/s)	Gretta Taslakian (LBN)	24.01	Maryam Toosi (IRI)	24.33	Dana Abdul Razak Hussein (IRQ)	24.64
400 metres	Gulustan Mahmood Ieso (IRQ)	54.39	Khazaal Inam Al-Sudani (IRQ)	55.66	Saria Trabulsi (LBN)	60.86
800 metres	Genzebe Shumi Regasa (BHR)	2:04.85	Khazaal Inam Al-Sudani (IRQ)	2:07.08	Mimi Belete (BHR)	2:09.00
1500 metres	Mimi Belete (BHR)	4:21.67	Genzebe Shumi Regasa (BHR)	4:23.10	Bethlem Desalegn (UAE)	4:29.24
5000 metres	Tejitu Daba (BHR)	17:11.77	Shitaye Eshete (BHR)	17:11.79	Mahboubeh Ghayour (IRI)	18:12.81
10,000 metres	Karima Saleh Jasim (BHR)	34:04.10	Shitaye Eshete (BHR)	34:04.41	Dalya Ahmed Mohammed (IRQ)	46:50.69
Half marathon	Lishan Dula (BHR)	1:18:21	Gladys Kibiwot (BHR)	1:25:03	Dalya Ahmed Mohammed (IRQ)	1:42:41
100 metres hurdles (wind: 0.0 m/s)	Fadwa Al-Bouza (SYR)	14.91	Alaa Hekmat (IRQ)	15.35 NR	Mirna Soker (SYR)	16.93
400 metres hurdles	Alaa Hekmat (IRQ)	64.63	Douaa Maghrebi (SYR)	68.7	Boushra Abbas (SYR)	71.24
3000 metres steeplechase	Karima Saleh Jasim (BHR)	10:34.61 NR	Aster Tesfaye (BHR)	11:12.65	Mahboubeh Ghayour (IRI)	11:36.52
4 × 100 metres relay	Iraq; Gulustan Mahmood Ieso; Dana Abdul Razak Hussein; Alaa Hekmat; Khazaal Inam Al-Sudani	47.36	Lebanon; Gretta Taslakian; Aziza Sbaity; Saria Trabulsi; Christel Saneh	51.40	Syria; Fadwa Al-Bouza; Minas Sulaiman; Rehane Sheeha; H. Mustafa	54.38
4 × 400 metres relay	Iraq; Alaa Hekmat; Zhilan Salah Mahmoud; Dana Abdul Razak Hussein; Gulustan Mahmood Ieso	3:43.60 NR	Lebanon; Gretta Taslakian; Saria Trabulsi; Aziza Sbaity; Diala El Khazen	3:59.59	Bahrain; Faten Abdennabi Mahdi; Genzebe Shumi Regasa; Tejitu Daba; Shitaye Eshete	4:02.55 NR
10,000 metres walk	Orouba Ammou (SYR)	52:38.52	Rania Osman (SYR)	53:14.03	Ayaa Abbas (PLE)	1:01:52.09
High jump	Sepideh Tavakkoli (IRI)	1.76 m NR	Rehane Sheeha (SYR)	1.55 m	Rahaf Shendieh (SYR)	1.50 m
Pole vault	Rehane Sheeha (SYR)	3.00 m NR	Rouba Al-Faseeh (SYR)	2.80 m	Jana Majed (LIB)	2.00 m
Long jump	Marah Daleh (SYR)	5.32 m	Christel Saneh (LIB)	5.19 m	Diala El Khazen (LIB)	5.16 m
Triple jump	Fadwa Al-Bouza (SYR)	12.29 m	Marah Daleh (SYR)	11.40 m	Christel Saneh (LBN)	11.13 m
Shot put	Leila Rajabi (IRI)	17.46 m	Hiba Omar (SYR)	11.50 m	Asmaa Khalifa Bouali (BHR)	11.11 m
Discus throw	Hiba Omar (SYR)	38.84 m	Elham Samarghandian (IRI)	37.64 m	Basma Mohamed Abduh (BHR)	31.19 m
Hammer throw	Lisa Al-Saleh (SYR)	43.53 m NR	Denia Hatem Mohamed (IRQ)	38.06 m NR	Shankal Hamou (SYR)	35.00 m
Javelin throw	Hala Ghaya (SYR)	35.20 m	Adaoua Arour (SYR)	32.51 m	Hadeel Fadhel Hussein (IRQ)	21.69 m
Heptathlon	Sepideh Tavakkoli (IRI)	4542 pts	Bahar Khasrou (IRQ)	3815 pts	Zina Hamid (IRQ)	3540 pts

== Medal table ==
Rank	Nation	Gold	Silver	Bronze	Total
1	Bahrain (BHR)	11	7	8	26
2	Iran (IRI)	9	8	7	24
3	Syria	8	7	9	24
4	Qatar (QAT)	5	4	3	12
5	Iraq (IRQ)	4	6	8	18
6	Saudi Arabia (KSA)	3	2	3	8
7	Lebanon (LIB)	2	4	4	10
8	Kuwait (KUW)	2	4	3	9
9	United Arab Emirates (UAE)	2	3	2	7
10	Oman (OMA)	0	1	0	1
11	Palestine (PLE)	0	0	1	1
Totals (11 entries)		46	46	48	140
