= Track and field at the 2011 Military World Games – Men's discus throw =

The men's discus throw event at the 2011 Military World Games was held on 23 July at the Estádio Olímpico João Havelange.

== Records ==
Prior to this competition, the existing world and CISM record were as follows:

World Record	Jürgen Schult (GDR)	74.08	Neubrandenburg, East Germany	6 June 1986
CISM World Record	Piotr Małachowski (POL)	65.87	Hyderabad, India	16 October 2007

== Schedule ==
Date	Time	Round
23 July 2011	09:45	Final

== Medalists ==
Gold	Silver	Bronze
Mahmoud Samimi; Iran	Rashid Al-Dosari; Qatar	Musab Momani; Jordan

== Results ==
=== Final ===
Rank	Athlete	Nationality	#1	#2	#3	#4	#5	#6	Mark	Notes
1st place, gold medalist(s)	Mahmoud Samimi	Iran	60.15	58.10	60.19	61.36	x	x	61.36	
2nd place, silver medalist(s)	Rashid Al-Dosari	Qatar	52.89	53.03	57.44	60.21	x	61.21	61.21	
3rd place, bronze medalist(s)	Musab Momani	Jordan	55.83	60.97	56.50	x	x	x	60.97	
4	Giovanni Faloci	Italy	59.52	57.62	57.76	x	56.84	59.23	59.52	
5	Sultan Al-Dawoodi	Saudi Arabia	52.42	55.74	54.23	x	58.15	55.54	58.15	
6	Hannes Kirchler	Italy	56.74	57.46	x	x	56.51	55.33	57.46	
7	Oleskii Semenov	Ukraine	56.79	55.65	55.91	55.85	57.04	57.37	57.37	
8	Siarhei Rohanau	Belarus	x	55.68	57.24	x	54.57	x	57.24	
9	Jesús Parejo	Venezuela	53.75	54.59	x				54.59	
10	Piotr Małachowski	Poland	53.67	33.65	52.93				53.67	
11	Basharat Ali	Pakistan	51.56	x	48.32				51.56	
12	Rashid Al-Meqbaali	United Arab Emirates	43.75	49.35	x				49.35	
13	Lukas Jost	Switzerland	38.85	49.28	x				49.28	
14	Andriy Semenov	Ukraine	48.54	–	DNF				48.54	
15	Adama Camara	Senegal	38.89	35.92	37.64				38.89	
16	Jorge Luis Chacón	Colombia	34.51	x	–				34.51	
