= 2015 Asian Athletics Championships – Men's discus throw =

The men's discus throw at the 2015 Asian Athletics Championships was held at the Wuhan, China on June 6.

== Results ==
Rank	Name	Nationality	#1	#2	#3	#4	#5	#6	Result	Notes
1st place, gold medalist(s)	Vikas Gowda	India	58.25	59.53	x	61.82	x	62.03	62.03	
2nd place, silver medalist(s)	Eisa Zankawi	Kuwait	57.79	54.14	51.56	60.44	59.24	61.57	61.57	
3rd place, bronze medalist(s)	Mahmoud Samimi	Iran	59.25	59.78	x	x	58.32	x	59.78	
4	Ahmed Mohammed Dheeb	Qatar	57.08	56.51	58.84	x	57.41		58.84	
5	Sultan Al-Dawoodi	Saudi Arabia	56.98	x	x	55.58	x	x	56.98	
6	Wu Jian	China	55.11	x	x	x	x	55.75	55.75	
7	Zhang Mengjie	China	53.22	55.69	55.36	54.85	54.89	x	55.69	
8	Arjun	India	x	x	55.47	x	x	x	55.47	
9	Mohd Irfan Shamsuddin	Malaysia	x	54.27	x				54.27	
10	Maksat Mammedov	Turkmenistan	52.76	52.72	53.18				53.18	
11	Yuji Tsutsumi	Japan	52.49	x	x				52.49	
12	Hardodi Sihombing	Indonesia	x	x	42.09				42.09	
	Ehsan Hadadi	Iran							DNS	
