= 2011 Arab Athletics Championships =

17th Arab Athletics Championships
- Dates: 26–29 October
- Host city: Al Ain, United Arab Emirates
- Participation: 17 nations

The 2011 Arab Athletics Championships was the seventeenth edition of the international athletics competition between Arab countries which took place in Al Ain, United Arab Emirates from 26–29 October.

== Medal summary ==
=== Men ===
Event	Gold		Silver		Bronze	
100 metres (wind: +0.0 m/s)	Aziz Ouhadi (MAR)	10.24	Barakat Al-Harthi (OMN)	10.27	Femi Ogunode (QAT)	10.37
200 metres	Femi Ogunode (QAT)	20.59	Omar Juma Al-Salfa (UAE)	21.02	Abdullah Al-Sooli (OMN)	21.19
400 metres	Rabah Yousif (SUD)	45.96	Ahmed Mohamed Al-Merjabi (OMN)	46.74	Abdelkrim Khoudri (MAR)	47.59
800 metres	Abdulkader El Nasser (SUD)	1:53.24	Mohammad Al-Azemi (KUW)	1:53.35	Amine El Manaoui (MAR)	1:53.73
1500 metres	Abderrahmane Anou (ALG)	3:58.78	Hamada Mohamed (EGY)	3:59.15	Mohamad Al-Garni (QAT)	3:59.23
5000 metres	Abubaker Ali Kamal (QAT)	15:35.53	Soufiane Boukantar (MAR)	15:36.99	Hicham Sigueni (MAR)	15:38.15
10,000 metres	Ahmad Holi Obaidullah (SUD)	29:57.62	Ali Al Wahshi Khalifa (UAE)	30:08.07	Issa Mohamad Abdullah (UAE)	32:47.74
Half marathon	Mansour Obaid Ahmed (UAE)	1:06:20	Issa Mohamad Abdullah (UAE)	1:17:57	Only two finishers	
110 metres hurdles	Fawzi Al-Shammari (KUW)	13.75	Abdulaziz Al-Mandeel (KUW)	13.79	Ilyes Mekdal (ALG)	13.80
400 metres hurdles	Abderahmane Hamadi (ALG)	51.10	Abdulagadir Idriss (SUD)	51.59	Hassan Akabbou (MAR)	51.73
3000 metres steeplechase	Hamid Ezzine (MAR)	8:41.98	Abubaker Ali Kamal (QAT)	8:43.93	Salem Mohamed Attiatalla (EGY)	9:38.36
4 × 100 m relay	Oman (OMN); Fahad Khamis Said Al Jabri; Barakat Al-Harthi; Abdullah Al-Sooli; Yahya Al-Nofali	39.53	United Arab Emirates (UAE); Hadef Saif Al-Zaabi; Belal Juma Al-Salfa; Hussain Rustom; Omar Juma Al-Salfa	39.85	Qatar (QAT); Ibrahim Abdulla Al-Waleed; Samuel Francis; Femi Ogunode; Eid Abdulla Al-Kuwari	40.13
4 × 400 m relay	Sudan (SUD); Awadelkarim Makki; Rabah Yousif; Hussein Hafiz; Abdulkader El Nasser	3:06.97	Saudi Arabia (KSA); Abdullah Ahmed Abkar; Younes Al-Housaoui; Mohamed Ali Al-Bishi; Mohammed Al-Salhi	3:07.62 -	Oman (OMN); Obaid Abdullah Al-Quraini; Othman Al-Busaidi; Abdullah Said Al-Hidi; Ahmed Mohamed Al-Merjabi	3:08.82
20 km walk	Hicham Medjber (ALG)	1:38:47	Mabrouk Saleh Nasser (QAT)	1:40:17	Amir Abdul Razak (IRQ)	1:54:38
High jump	Mutaz Essa Barshim (QAT)	2.25 m	Majd Eddin Ghazal (SYR)	2.22 m	Ali Mohd Younes Idriss (SUD)	2.13 m
Pole vault	Fahid Bader Al-Mershad (KUW)	5.00 m	Mouhcine Cheaouri (MAR)	4.80 m	Mohamed Mulla Khalaf (SYR)	4.80 m
Long jump	Yahya Berrabah (MAR)	7.85 m	Mohamed Fathalla Difallah (EGY)	7.65 m	El Mehdi Kabbachi (MAR)	7.30 m
Triple jump	Issam Nima (ALG)	16.41 m	Ammr Shouman (EGY)	15.87 m	Mohamed Abbas Darwish (UAE)	15.78 m
Shot put	Meshari Suroor Saad (KUW)	19.15 m	Ahmad Hassan Gholoum (KUW)	18.67 m	Musab Ibrahim Al-Momani (JOR)	17.18 m
Discus throw	Haidar Nasir (IRQ)	57.89 m	Essa Al-Zenkawi (KUW)	54.96 m	Musab Ibrahim Al-Momani (JOR)	54.08 m
Hammer throw	Ali Al-Zinkawi (KUW)	79.27 m	Alaa El-Din El-Ashry (EGY)	69.31 m	Hassan Mohamed Mahmoud (EGY)	67.15 m
Javelin throw	Ihab El-Sayed (EGY)	78.83 m	Ammar Makki Al-Najm (IRQ)	73.83 m	Ahmed Samir Elshabramsly (EGY)	70.38 m
Decathlon	Mohammed J.M. Al-Qaree (KSA)	7498 pts	Mourad Souissi (ALG)	6744 pts	Hisham Nizar Al-Sharaf (KSA)	5930 pts

=== Women ===
Event	Gold		Silver		Bronze	
100 metres	Gretta Taslakian (LIB)	11.97	Dana Hussain (IRQ)	12.06	Salima Jamali (MAR)	12.14
200 metres	Gretta Taslakian (LIB)	23.68	Salima Jamali (MAR)	24.48	Dana Hussain (IRQ)	24.49
400 metres	Dana Hussain (IRQ)	55.74	Alaa Hikmat (IRQ)	56.32	Fassila Fnides (ALG)	56.36
800 metres	Genzeb Shumi (BHR)	2:03.13	Malika Akkaoui (MAR)	2:05.15	Amina Bettiche (ALG)	2:09.53
1500 metres	Genzeb Shumi (BHR)	4:19.15	Alia Saeed Mohammed (UAE)	4:22.48	Amina Bettiche (ALG)	4:23.24
5000 metres	Shitaye Eshete (BHR)	16:9.11	Alia Saeed Mohammed (UAE)	16:10.67	Tejitu Daba (BHR)	16:40.37
10,000 metres	Shitaye Eshete (BHR)	33:28.07	Kaltoum Bouaasayriya (MAR)	34:33.38	Iman Ahmed Talbab (EGY)	42:6.69
Half marathon	Lishan Dula (BHR)	1:12:10	Souad Aït Salem (ALG)	1:12:19	Samira Raif (MAR)	1:12:28
100 metres hurdles	Lamiae Lhabze (MAR)	14.23	Sarah Abou Hasan (EGY)	14.38	Roumeissa Belabiod (ALG)	14.46
400 metres hurdles	Hayat Lambarki (MAR)	58.11	Lamiae Lhabze (MAR)	58.48	Houria Moussa (ALG)	58 .85
3000 metres steeplechase	Salima El Ouali Alami (MAR)	10:28.06	Fadwa Sidi Madane (MAR)	10:44.04	Halima Salem Ali (UAE)	10:48.06
4 × 100 m relay	Morocco (MAR); Jamaa Chnaik; Hayat Lambarki; Lamiae Lhabze; Salima Jamali	46.84	Algeria (ALG); Kheira Fatima Bourahla; Zouhair Loualah; Houria Moussa; Nadia Remaoune	47.12	Egypt (EGY); Sarah Abou Hasan; Enas Gharib; Yousra Majdi Douidar; Asma Mohamad Yousef	47.61
4 × 400 m relay	Morocco (MAR); Salima Jamali; Malika Akkaoui; Lamiae Lhabze; Hayat Lambarki	3:40.58	Sudan (SUD); Jomaa Fayza Omer; Ehssan Arbab; Alawia Maki; Tasabih Mohamed El Sayed	3:47.59	Iraq (IRQ); Alaa Hikmat; Inam Khazaal Al-Sudani; Dana Hussain; Hadeel Raheem Kaood	3:49.34
10 km walk	Jihad Adel Musharef (EGY)	57:07	Oroba Ammo (SYR)	58:47	Mariam Ibrahim Hasan (UAE)	1:23:6
High jump	Rhizlane Siba (MAR)	1.76 m	Besnet Moussad Mohamed (EGY)	1.73 m	Rihane Shiba (SYR)	1.55 m
Pole vault	Nisrine Dinar (MAR)	3.60 m	Dunia Ahmad Al Tabbah (EGY)	3.30 m	Rihane Shiba (SYR)	3.00 m
Long jump	Roumeissa Belabiod (ALG)	6.03 m	Jamaa Chnaik (MAR)	5.91 m	Enas Gharib (EGY)	5.91 m
Triple jump	Baya Rahouli (ALG)	13.59 m	Enas Gharib (EGY)	12.92 m	Jamaa Chnaik (MAR)	12.66 m
Shot put	Doha Mohamed Attia (EGY)	14.65 m	Fadia Saad Al-Qasby (EGY)	13.59 m	Hiba Omar (SYR)	13.46 m
Discus throw	Elham El Sayed Wahaba (EGY)	48.80 m	Sarah Sayed Haseeb (EGY)	44.69 m	Hiba Omar (SYR)	42.27 m
Hammer throw	Rana Taha Ibrahim (EGY)	59.40 m	Zouina Bouzebra (ALG)	58.33 m	Nehal Kamal Fahmy (EGY)	57.83 m
Javelin throw	Reda Adel Ahmed (EGY)	43.76 m	Hanane Daoudi (MAR)	41.03 m	Hela Giya (SYR)	40.99 m
Heptathlon	Wedian Mokhtar (EGY)	4699 pts	Radhwa Fathy Haris (EGY)	4694 pts	Katia Amokrane (ALG)	4463 pts

== Medal table ==
=== Overall ===
Rank	Nation	Gold	Silver	Bronze	Total
1	Morocco (MAR)	10	9	8	27
2	Egypt (EGY)	7	11	7	25
3	Algeria (ALG)	6	4	7	17
4	Bahrain (BHR)	5	0	1	6
5	Kuwait (KUW)	4	4	0	8
6	Sudan (SUD)	4	2	1	7
7	Qatar (QAT)	3	2	3	8
8	Iraq (IRQ)	2	3	3	8
9	Lebanon (LIB)	2	0	0	2
10	United Arab Emirates (UAE)	1	6	4	11
11	Oman (OMN)	1	2	2	5
12	Saudi Arabia (KSA)	1	1	1	3
13	Syria (SYR)	0	2	6	8
14	Jordan (JOR)	0	0	2	2
15	Palestine (PLE)	0	0	0	0
15	Somalia (SOM)	0	0	0	0
Totals (16 entries)		46	46	45	137

=== Men ===
Rank	Nation	Gold	Silver	Bronze	Total
1	Kuwait (KUW)	4	4	0	8
2	Algeria (ALG)	4	1	1	6
2	Sudan (SUD)	4	1	1	6
4	Morocco (MAR)	3	2	5	10
5	Qatar (QAT)	3	2	3	8
6	Egypt (EGY)	1	4	3	8
7	United Arab Emirates (UAE)	1	4	2	7
8	Oman (OMN)	1	2	2	5
9	Iraq (IRQ)	1	1	1	3
9	Saudi Arabia (KSA)	1	1	1	3
11	Syria (SYR)	0	1	1	2
12	Jordan (JOR)	0	0	2	2
13	Lebanon (LIB)	0	0	0	0
13	Palestine (PLE)	0	0	0	0
13	Somalia (SOM)	0	0	0	0
Totals (15 entries)		23	23	22	68

=== Women ===
Rank	Nation	Gold	Silver	Bronze	Total
1	Morocco (MAR)	7	7	3	17
2	Egypt (EGY)	6	7	4	17
3	Bahrain (BHR)	5	0	1	6
4	Algeria (ALG)	2	3	6	11
5	Lebanon (LIB)	2	0	0	2
6	Iraq (IRQ)	1	2	2	5
7	United Arab Emirates (UAE)	0	2	2	4
8	Syria (SYR)	0	1	5	6
9	Sudan (SUD)	0	1	0	1
Totals (9 entries)		23	23	23	69

== See also ==
- Athletics at the 2011 Pan Arab Games
