= Athletics at the 2006 Asian Games – Men's discus throw =

Men's discus throw at the 2006 Asian Games
- Venue: Khalifa International Stadium
- Date: 10 December 2006
- Competitors: 12 from 9 nations

Medalists
gold medal	Ehsan Haddadi	Iran
silver medal	Rashid Shafi Al-Dosari	Qatar
bronze medal	Sultan Al-Dawoodi	Saudi Arabia

The men's discus throw competition at the 2006 Asian Games in Doha, Qatar was held on 10 December 2006 at the Khalifa International Stadium.

== Schedule ==
All times are Arabia Standard Time (UTC+03:00)

Date	Time	Event
Sunday, 10 December 2006	16:10	Final

== Records ==
Prior to this competition, the existing world, Asian and Games records were as follows.

World Record	Jürgen Schult (GDR)	74.08	Neubrandenburg, East Germany	6 June 1986
Asian Record	Ehsan Haddadi (IRI)	65.25	Incheon, South Korea	1 September 2005
Games Record	Li Shaojie (CHN)	64.58	Bangkok, Thailand	17 December 1998

== Results ==
Rank	Athlete	Attempt						Result	Notes
Rank	Athlete	1	2	3	4	5	6	Result	Notes
1st place, gold medalist(s)	Ehsan Haddadi (IRI)	60.16	59.98	56.83	60.32	63.79	X	63.79	
2nd place, silver medalist(s)	Rashid Shafi Al-Dosari (QAT)	58.45	57.11	X	X	59.00	62.11	62.11	
3rd place, bronze medalist(s)	Sultan Al-Dawoodi (KSA)	58.30	53.38	60.82	59.35	X	54.62	60.82	
4	Abbas Samimi (IRI)	56.60	X	X	59.69	57.91	57.30	59.69	
5	Wu Tao (CHN)	57.42	X	56.79	58.54	55.47	54.70	58.54	
6	Vikas Gowda (IND)	49.96	57.74	57.32	58.05	58.28	56.76	58.28	
7	Ahmed Dheeb (QAT)	50.01	55.17	49.69	54.12	X	X	55.17	
8	Choi Jong-bum (KOR)	50.81	52.91	54.08	X	X	54.69	54.69	
9	Basharat Ali (PAK)	51.70	53.23	51.91				53.23	
10	Saad Al-Baqme (KSA)	50.55	52.13	X				52.13	
11	Haidar Nasir (IRQ)	X	49.47	51.48				51.48	
12	Wansawang Sawasdee (THA)	51.32	X	50.72				51.32	
