= 2007 Asian Athletics Championships – Men's discus throw =

The men's discus throw event at the 2007 Asian Athletics Championships was held in Amman, Jordan on July 27.

== Results ==
Rank	Name	Nationality	Result	Notes
1st place, gold medalist(s)	Ehsan Haddadi	Iran	65.38	CR
2nd place, silver medalist(s)	Rashid Shafi Al-Dosari	Qatar	63.49	
3rd place, bronze medalist(s)	Abbas Samimi	Iran	61.29	
4	Vikas Gowda	India	60.91	
5	Ahmed Mohamed Dheeb	Qatar	56.53	
6	Shigeo Hatakeyama	Japan	56.16	
7	Musab Al-Momani	Jordan	53.94	
	Ebrahim Al-Foudari	Kuwait	DNS	
	Mahmed Manisor	Syria	DNS	
