= List of Iraqi records in athletics =

The following are the national records in athletics in Iraq maintained by Iraqi Amateur Athletic Federation (IAAF).

== Outdoor ==
Key to tables: Awaiting ratification Record not kept by IAAF Not ratified or later rescinded by IAAF

=== Men ===
Event	Record	Athlete	Date	Meet	Place	Ref.
100 m	10.21 (−0.7 m/s)	Falah Al-Khazaali	9 July 2026	Asian U23 Championships	Ordos, China	
200 m	20.81 NWI	Taha Hussein Yaseen	6 November 2020		Baghdad, Iraq	
400 m	45.74	Taha Hussein Yaseen	22 April 2019	Asian Championships	Doha, Qatar	
800 m	1:45.88	Adnan Almntfage	25 November 2010	Asian Games	Guangzhou, China	
1500 m	3:42.50	Adnan Almntfage	29 September 2014	Asian Games	Incheon, South Korea	
3000 m	8:11.12	Ali Jasim Abdulridha	4 July 2026	Meeting voor Mon - Polsstokgala	Leuven, Belgium	
5000 m	14:00.56	Mohammed Abdullah Mahal	5 June 2021		Bursa, Turkey	
10,000 m	30:06.0 h	Abdulkarim Al-Sadi	9 November 1986		Mosul, Iraq	
10,000 m	30:01.14	Ali Jassim Abbas Abdelreda	2 November 2023	Iraqi Championships	Baghdad, Iraq	
Marathon	2:21:54	Sadoun Nassir	3 January 1982		Baghdad, Iraq	
110 m hurdles	13.78 (+1.4 m/s)	Mohd Saad Nathim Al-Khafaji	25 July 2019		Baghdad, Iraq	
110 m hurdles	13.78 NWI	Saleh Kadhem Nasser	3 May 2024	National Test Competition	Baghdad, Iraq	
400 m hurdles	49.95	Talib Faizal Al-Saffar	22 August 1977	Universiade	Sofia, Bulgaria	
3000 m steeplechase	8:43.26	Mohammed Abdullah Mahal	21 May 2022		Bursa, Turkey	
3000 m steeplechase	8:35.85	Mohamed Abdullah Mahal	26 April 2023	West Asian Championships	Doha, Qatar	
High jump	2.20 m	Hussein Al-Ibraheemi	19 September 2019		Sulaymaniyah, Iraq	
Pole vault	5.45 m	Muntadher Faleh Abdulwahid	15 June 2019		Najaf, Iraq	
Long jump	7.66 m NWI	Barek Amer Al-Bayati	13 October 2017		Baghdad, Iraq	
Triple jump	16.48 m (+1.7 m/s)	Majed Jabbar	8 May 1996		Baghdad, Iraq	
Shot put	18.30 m	Khaled Muhamad Wajih	21 August 1989		Baghdad, Iraq	
Discus throw	60.89 m	Mustafa Alsaamah	16 May 2017	Islamic Solidarity Games	Baku, Azerbaijan	
Hammer throw	64.12 m	Hussein Abdulwahid Al-Bayati	1 May 2021		Najaf, Iraq	
Javelin throw	76.82 m	Younis Mohsen Saleh	12 April 2021	1st International Imam Reza Cup	Mashhad, Iran	
Decathlon	7271 pts NWI	Abdel Sajjad Saadoun Nasser	11–12 April 2021	1st International Imam Reza Cup	Mashhad, Iran	
Decathlon	100m / Long jump / Shot put / High jump / 400m / 110m H / Discus / Pole vault / Javelin / 1500m; 11.58 (NWI) / 7.05 m (NWI) / 11.92 m / 1.98 m / 49.20 / 15.25 (NWI) / 37.09 m / 4.35 m / 41.41 m / 4:12.35					
20 km walk (road)	1:37:27	Amir Abdul Razak Alwan	24 April 2015	Arab Championships	Manama, Bahrain	
50 km walk (road)						
4 × 100 m relay	40.44	Iraq; Hasanain Hasa Zubaiyen; Falah Abdulzahra; Mohamed; Juma	26 April 2015	Arab Championships	Manama, Bahrain	
4 × 100 m relay	40.32	Iraq; F. A. Mahdi; H. S. Hussein; S. R. Abdul Wahid; Hussein Ali Nahi Al-Khafaji	1 June 2024	West Asian Championships	Basra, Iraq	
4 × 400 m relay	3:04.94	Iraq; Yasser Ali Mohamed; Ehab Jabhar Hashim; Mohamed Abdul Ridha; Taha Hussein Yaseen	16 July 2023	Asian Championships	Bangkok, Thailand	

=== Women ===
Event	Record	Athlete	Date	Meet	Place	Ref.
100 m	11.24 (±0.0 m/s)	Dana Hussain	17 June 2021	Arab Championships	Radès, Tunisia	
200 m	22.51 (±0.0 m/s) (Note: by World Athletics Profile, irregular +2.2 m/s by other sources)	Dana Hussain	20 June 2021	Arab Championships	Radès, Tunisia	
400 m	53.44	Gulustan Mahmood Ieso	21 November 2010	Asian Games	Guangzhou, China	
400 m	52.80 X	Gulustan Mahmood Ieso	8 July 2011	Asian Championships	Kobe, Japan	
800 m	2:04.92	Eman Sabeeh Hussain	5 August 1985		Casablanca, Morocco	
1500 m	4:23.5 h	Maysa Matrood	15 May 1995		Baghdad, Iraq	
3000 m	9:30.0 h	Maysa Matrood	27 August 1993		Baghdad, Iraq	
5000 m	16:39.3 h	Maysa Matrood	6 May 1994		Baghdad, Iraq	
10,000 m	35:44.93	Maysa Matrood	2 August 1997	World Championships	Athens, Greece	
10 km (road)	47:26+	Yasmin Wadhai	20 January 2017	Dubai Marathon	Dubai, United Arab Emirates	
15 km (road)	1:10:54+	Yasmin Wadhai	20 January 2017	Dubai Marathon	Dubai, United Arab Emirates	
Half marathon	1:35:54	Yasmin Wadhai	20 November 2015	Abu Dhabi Striders Half Marathon	Abu Dhabi, United Arab Emirates	
25 km (road)	1:58:34+	Yasmin Wadhai	20 January 2017	Dubai Marathon	Dubai, United Arab Emirates	
30 km (road)	2:22:05+	Yasmin Wadhai	20 January 2017	Dubai Marathon	Dubai, United Arab Emirates	
Marathon	3:22:23	Yasmin Wadhai	20 January 2017	Dubai Marathon	Dubai, United Arab Emirates	
100 m hurdles	14.52 NWI	Delsoz Obaid Najim	19 September 2019		Sulaymaniyah, Iraq	
100 m hurdles	14.38 (+1.8 m/s)	Kurdistan Bamo Jamal	26 April 2023	West Asian Championships	Doha, Qatar	
100 m hurdles	14.37 (+1.7 m/s) X	Deren Bakhtiar Ali	26 April 2024	Asian U20 Championships	Dubai, United Arab Emirates	
400 m hurdles	1:00.15	Dina Saadoun	15 November 1989	Asian Championships	New Delhi, India	
3000 m steeplechase	13:34.4	Dalya Ahmed Mohammed	25/27 April 2012		Baghdad, Iraq	
High jump	1.81 m	Mariyam Abdul Hameed	18 March 2022		Baghdad, Iraq	
Pole vault	2.80 m	Zahraa Jamal Al-Dulaimeh	3 November 2020		Najaf, Iraq	
Pole vault	2.90 m	Nisreen Mohamed Hassoun	25 November 2022	Iraqi Championships	Baghdad, Iraq	
Long jump	5.60 m	Eiman Nouri Fathi	13 July 1977		Baghdad, Iraq	
Triple jump	11.84 m NWI	Jawan Bahauddin Hassan	30 October 2021		Baghdad, Iraq	
Shot put	11.60 m	Raida Oudeh	26 October 1979		Baghdad, Iraq	
Discus throw	40.16 m	Sabreen Kadhum Hussein	25 April 2015	Arab Championships	Manama, Bahrain	
Discus throw	40.64 m	Adhraa Nabil Jalil	7 March 2023	National University Championships	Baghdad, Iraq	
Discus throw	42.66 m	Afaq Faeeq Hadi	3 November 2023	Iraqi Championships	Baghdad, Iraq	
Hammer throw	46.62 m	Marwa Qais Marhoun	7 April 2019		Kuwait City, Kuwait	
Hammer throw	47.95 m	Marwa Qais Marhoun	27 April 2023	West Asian Championships	Doha, Qatar	
Javelin throw	39.50 m	Intisar Noree	2013			
Javelin throw	40.74 m	Asia Azir Qadir	24 November 2022	Iraqi Championships	Baghdad, Iraq	
Javelin throw	40.88 m	Asia Azir Qadir	28 April 2023	West Asian Championships	Doha, Qatar	
Heptathlon	4026 pts	Bahar Kasrou	6–7 October 2009	Arab Championships	Damascus, Syria	
Heptathlon	100m H / High jump / Shot put / 200m / Long jump / Javelin / 800m; 15.47 / 1.43 m / 7.76 m / 26.67 / 4.97 m / 20.72 m / 2:27.55					
Heptathlon	4118 pts	Baneen Ahmad Abd Al-Wahaab	7–8 March 2024	National Championships	Sulaymaniyah, Iraq	
Heptathlon	100m H / High jump / Shot put / 200m / Long jump / Javelin / 800m					
20 km walk (road)						
50 km walk (road)						
4 × 100 m relay	47.22	Iraq; Bahar Kasrou; Alaa Hikmat; Danah Abdulrazzaq; Gulustan Mahmood Ieso	7 October 2009	Arab Championships	Damascus, Syria	
4 × 400 m relay	3:43.60	A. H. Al-Qaysi; Z. S. Mahmoud; D. H. Abdulrazzak; K. Mahmoud Ieso	20 September 2010	Aleppo, Syria		
4 × 400 m relay	3:41.91	Iraq; Alaa Al-Qaysi; Inam Al-Sudani; Gulustan Ieso; Danah Abdulrazzaq	10 July 2011	Asian Championships	Kobe, Japan	

=== Mixed ===
Event	Record	Athlete	Date	Meet	Place	Ref.
4 × 400 m relay	3:37.40	Iraq; M. A. Chunchun; M. B. Iyad; K. Y. Jamal; R. J. Saad	26 April 2023	West Asian Championships	Doha, Qatar	
4 × 400 m relay	3:27.12	Iraq; M. A. Chunchun; S. F. Abboud; T. H. Yaseen; B. M. Mahmoud	29 May 2024	West Asian Championships	Basra, Iraq	

== Indoor ==
=== Men ===
Event	Record	Athlete	Date	Meet	Place	Ref.
60 m	6.85	Falah Abdulzahra Mahdi	3 March 2019		Tehran, Iran	
60 m	6.73	Murtadha Al-Kemawee	18 February 2024	Asian Championships	Tehran, Iran	
60 m	6.72	Murtadha Al-Kemawee	18 February 2024	Asian Championships	Tehran, Iran	
200 m	22.39	Ahmed Essam Obeid	14 February 2015		Boston, United States	
400 m	47.80	Yassir Al-Saadi	24 February 2019		Istanbul, Turkey	
800 m	1:49.42	Adnan Al-Mntfage	19 February 2012	Asian Championships	Hangzhou, China	
1500 m	3:44.38	Adnan Taess Akkar	18 February 2009	GE Galan	Stockholm, Sweden	
3000 m	8:17.34	Mohamed Abdullah Mahal	5 February 2021		Istanbul, Turkey	
60 m hurdles	7.77	Amir Shaker	28 February 2016	Swedish Championships	Malmö, Sweden	
High jump	2.10 m	Hussein Falah Al Ibrahimi	4 March 2019		Tehran, Iran	
Pole vault	5.30 m	Muntaher Faleh Abdelwahid	20 February 2016	Asian Championships	Doha, Qatar	
Long jump	6.79 m (Note: record set during heptathlon competition)	Abdul Sajad Saadoun Nasser	6 March 2021		Istanbul, Turkey	
Long jump	6.92 m	Abdul Sajjad Saadoun Nasser	12 January 2023	Iranian Club Championships	Tehran, Iran	
Triple jump	15.49 m	Hussein Abbas Al-Behadii	3 March 2019		Tehran, Iran	
Shot put	17.39 m	Saif Nour Abdulwahad	13 February 2015		Tehran, Iran	
Heptathlon	5308 pts	Abdul Sajad Saadoun Nasser	6–6 March 2021		Istanbul, Turkey	
Heptathlon	60m / Long jump / Shot put / High jump / 60m H / Pole vault / 1000m; 7.45 / 6.79 m / 12.25 m / 1.92 m / 8.53 / 4.30 m / 2:36.97					
5000 m walk						
4 × 400 m relay	3:12.09	Iraq; Taha Hussein Yaseen; Ihab Jabbar Hashim; Mohammed Abdulridha al-Tameemi; Yasir Ali al-Saadi	19 February 2024	Asian Championships	Tehran, Iran	

=== Women ===
Event	Record	Athlete	Date	Meet	Place	Ref.
60 m	7.50	Dana Hussain	3 March 2019		Tehran, Iran	
200 m						
400 m	53.75	Gulustan Mahmood	1 November 2009	Asian Indoor Games	Hanoi, Vietnam	
800 m	2:25.90	Alaa Hikmat Al-Qaysi	26 February 2010	Asian Championships	Tehran, Iran	
1500 m	4:38.6 h	Maysa Matrood	12 October 2001		Rasht, Iran	
3000 m	10:05.6 h	Maysa Matrood	12 October 2001		Rasht, Iran	
60 m hurdles	8.84	Delsoz Obaid Najim	4 March 2019		Tehran, Iran	
High jump	1.44 m	Anwar Jebur	26 February 2010		Doha, Qatar	
Pole vault						
Long jump	5.09 m	Sara Salar Ameen	15 December 2019		Istanbul, Turkey	
Triple jump						
Shot put	9.27 m	Alaa Hikmat Al-Qaysi	26 February 2010		Tehran, Iran	
Pentathlon	2926 pts	Zinah Hamid	13 February 2015		Tehran, Iran	
Pentathlon	60m H / High jump / Shot put / Long jump / 800m					
3000 m walk						
4 × 400 m relay	3:59.01	Iraq; Khazaal; Ilab Jassem Hikmat; Kolestane Mahmoud; Dana Hussein Abdulrazak	2 November 2009	Asian Indoor Games	Hanoi, Vietnam	
