= 2005 European Athletics U23 Championships – Men's discus throw =

The men's discus throw event at the 2005 European Athletics U23 Championships was held in Erfurt, Germany, at Steigerwaldstadion on 14 and 16 July.

== Medalists ==
Gold	Robert Harting; Germany
Silver	Piotr Małachowski; Poland
Bronze	Dzmitry Sivakou; Belarus

== Results ==
=== Final ===
16 July

Rank	Name	Nationality	Attempts						Result	Notes
Rank	Name	Nationality	1	2	3	4	5	6	Result	Notes
1st place, gold medalist(s)	Robert Harting	Germany	63.21	64.50	x	x	59.41	–	64.50	CR
2nd place, silver medalist(s)	Piotr Małachowski	Poland	59.98	63.99	x	x	x	x	63.99	
3rd place, bronze medalist(s)	Dzmitry Sivakou	Belarus	57.17	60.09	x	58.98	60.62	x	60.62	
4	Vadim Hranovschi	Moldova	58.78	59.15	x	57.87	57.61	59.71	59.71	
5	Erik Cadée	Netherlands	57.81	x	59.39	59.45	x	58.02	59.45	
6	Sascha Hördt	Germany	55.79	58.78	56.37	x	55.51	x	58.78	
7	Michał Hodun	Poland	57.96	58.30	55.88	x	x	57.23	58.30	
8	Serhiy Pruhlo	Ukraine	56.35	57.97	55.15	x	57.21	x	57.97	
9	Daniel Vanek	Slovakia	57.41	56.09	x				57.41	
10	Milosz Tomanek	Belgium	55.42	x	53.07				55.42	
11	Bertrand Vili	France	55.40	x	x				55.40	
12	Konrad Szuster	Poland	54.00	54.63	55.16				55.16	

=== Qualifications ===
14 July
Qualifying 57.50 or 12 best to the Final

==== Group A ====
Rank	Name	Nationality	Result	Notes
1	Dzmitry Sivakou	Belarus	57.14	q
2	Michał Hodun	Poland	56.69	q
3	Erik Cadée	Netherlands	55.79	q
4	Sascha Hördt	Germany	54.07	q
5	Piotr Małachowski	Poland	54.05	q
6	Martin Marić	Croatia	52.34	
7	Christian Ehrenborg	Sweden	51.51	
8	Lájos Tóth	Hungary	50.94	
9	Nazzareno Di Marco	Italy	50.84	
10	Nikolaos Loukopoulos	Greece	49.77	
11	Andrius Šipalis	Lithuania	48.89	

==== Group B ====
Rank	Name	Nationality	Result	Notes
1	Robert Harting	Germany	61.74	Q
2	Daniel Vanek	Slovakia	57.91	Q
3	Vadim Hranovschi	Moldova	57.83	Q
4	Serhiy Pruhlo	Ukraine	55.35	q
5	Bertrand Vili	France	54.96	q
6	Konrad Szuster	Poland	54.88	q
7	Milosz Tomanek	Belgium	54.34	q
8	Andrius Butrimas	Lithuania	51.94	
9	Marius Višniakovas	Lithuania	51.90	
10	Orestis Antoniades	Cyprus	49.07	
11	Kemal Mešić	Bosnia and Herzegovina	48.36	
12	Giovanni Faloci	Italy	47.16	

== Participation ==
According to an unofficial count, 23 athletes from 17 countries participated in the event.

- Belarus (1)
- Belgium (1)
- Bosnia and Herzegovina (1)
- Croatia (1)
- Cyprus (1)
- France (1)
- Germany (2)
- Greece (1)
- Hungary (1)
- Italy (2)
- Lithuania (3)
- Moldova (1)
- Netherlands (1)
- Poland (3)
- Slovakia (1)
- Sweden (1)
- Ukraine (1)
