= 2003 European Athletics U23 Championships – Men's discus throw =

The men's discus throw event at the 2003 European Athletics U23 Championships was held in Bydgoszcz, Poland, at Zawisza Stadion on 17 and 19 July.

== Medalists ==
Gold	Rutger Smith; Netherlands
Silver	Dzmitry Sivakou; Belarus
Bronze	Bogdan Pishchalnikov; Russia

== Results ==
=== Final ===
19 July

Rank	Name	Nationality	Attempts						Result	Notes
Rank	Name	Nationality	1	2	3	4	5	6	Result	Notes
1st place, gold medalist(s)	Rutger Smith	Netherlands	58.65	59.90	59.84	x	58.22	x	59.90	
2nd place, silver medalist(s)	Dzmitry Sivakou	Belarus	56.28	58.00	57.63	56.34	–	57.55	58.00	
3rd place, bronze medalist(s)	Bogdan Pishchalnikov	Russia	52.93	54.25	55.15	51.35	56.05	56.88	56.88	
4	Daniel Vanek	Slovakia	54.58	56.59	55.48	54.13	x	54.52	56.59	
5	Ömer İnan	Turkey	52.93	55.45	54.53	53.92	53.95	55.62	55.62	
6	Kris Coene	Belgium	x	50.35	54.84	54.43	55.61	55.08	55.61	
7	Bertrand Vili	France	54.88	54.86	x	54.72	x	x	54.88	
8	Märt Israel	Estonia	54.86	x	49.93	54.07	53.58	52.29	54.86	
9	Piotr Małachowski	Poland	52.65	52.10	54.79				54.79	
10	Oleksiy Semenov	Ukraine	54.16	54.11	53.74				54.16	
11	Manuel Florido	Spain	52.81	53.74	x				53.74	
12	Yeoryios Tsolakidis	Greece	53.65	53.26	53.24				53.65	

=== Qualifications ===
17 July
Qualifying 57.60 or 12 best to the Final

==== Group A ====
Rank	Name	Nationality	Result	Notes
1	Dzmitry Sivakou	Belarus	55.40	q
2	Manuel Florido	Spain	54.69	q
3	Yeoryios Tsolakidis	Greece	53.41	q
4	Oleksiy Semenov	Ukraine	53.38	q
5	Raigo Toompuu	Estonia	53.27	
6	Staffan Jönsson	Sweden	53.14	
7	Danilo Liorni	Italy	52.85	
8	Vadim Hranovschi	Moldova	52.52	
9	Michał Hodun	Poland	51.62	
10	Oskars Vaisjūns	Latvia	49.82	
11	Óðinn Björn Þorsteinsson	Iceland	49.20	
12	Scot Thompson	United Kingdom	48.89	
13	Alexandros Klapsis	Greece	48.21	
14	Nicolas Deldycke	France	47.51	
	Georgios Arestis	Cyprus	NM	

==== Group B ====
Rank	Name	Nationality	Result	Notes
1	Rutger Smith	Netherlands	58.98	Q
2	Kris Coene	Belgium	58.17	Q
3	Bogdan Pishchalnikov	Russia	56.73	q
4	Daniel Vanek	Slovakia	56.71	q
5	Märt Israel	Estonia	56.18	q
6	Bertrand Vili	France	55.77	q
7	Piotr Małachowski	Poland	55.48	q
8	Ömer İnan	Turkey	53.99	q
9	Lájos Tóth	Hungary	52.44	
10	Pedro José Cuesta	Spain	52.35	
11	Jorge Grave	Portugal	52.03	
12	Jouni Waldén	Finland	51.62	
13	Jean-François Aurokiom	France	51.33	
14	Rinaldo Favilli	Italy	49.91	
15	Andrius Butrimas	Lithuania	47.40	

== Participation ==
According to an unofficial count, 30 athletes from 23 countries participated in the event.

- Belarus (1)
- Belgium (1)
- Cyprus (1)
- Estonia (2)
- Finland (1)
- France (3)
- Greece (2)
- Hungary (1)
- Iceland (1)
- Italy (2)
- Latvia (1)
- Lithuania (1)
- Moldova (1)
- Netherlands (1)
- Poland (2)
- Portugal (1)
- Russia (1)
- Slovakia (1)
- Spain (2)
- Sweden (1)
- Turkey (1)
- Ukraine (1)
- United Kingdom (1)
