= Haidar Nasir =

Iraqi discus thrower (born 1981)

Haidar Nasir Abdulshaheed (Arabic: حيدر ناصر عبد الشهيد) also known as Haider Jabreen, (born 13 January 1981 in Najaf) is an Iraqi discus thrower. He competed for Iraq at the 2008 Summer Olympics in Beijing. He was one of only four competitors on the 2008 Iraqi Olympic team.

He was eleventh at the 2006 Asian Games, fourth in the discus at the 2009 Asian Athletics Championships, and seventh at the 2010 Asian Games. He participated at the 2009 World Championships in Athletics, but failed to record a mark.

== Achievements ==
Year	Competition	Venue	Position	Notes
Representing Iraq
2005	West Asian Games	Doha, Qatar	5th	54.77 m
2006	Asian Games	Doha, Qatar	11th	51.48 m
2007	Pan Arab Games	Cairo, Egypt	4th	53.53 m
2008	Olympic Games	Beijing, China	36th (q)	54.19 m
2009	World Championships	Berlin, Germany	–	NM
2009	Arab Championships	Damascus, Syria	2nd	59.54 m
2009	Asian Championships	Guangzhou, China	4th	58.00 m
2010	West Asian Championships	Aleppo, Syria	4th	58.47 m
2010	Asian Games	Guangzhou, China	6th	55.44 m
2011	Asian Championships	Kobe, Japan	8th	51.25 m
2011	Arab Championships	Al Ain, United Arab Emirates	1st	57.89 m
2011	Pan Arab Games	Doha, Qatar	4th	58.11 m
2013	Arab Championships	Doha, Qatar	6th	57.03 m
2013	Asian Championships	Pune, India	9th	54.05 m
2013	Islamic Solidarity Games	Palembang, Indonesia	7th	55.75 m
