= Mohammad Samimi =

Iranian discus thrower

Medal record

Representing Iran

Men's athletics

Asian Games
Silver medal – second place	2010 Guangzhou	Discus

Asian Championships
Silver medal – second place	2009 Guangzhou	Discus
Silver medal – second place	2013 Pune	Discus

Universiade
Gold medal – first place	2009 Belgrade	Discus

Islamic Solidarity Games
Silver medal – second place	2013 Palembang	Discus

Mohammad Samimi (Persian: محمد صمیمی, born 29 March 1987 in Shahrekord) is an Iranian discus thrower.

== Personal life ==
He is the younger brother of Abbas Samimi and the older brother of Mahmoud Samimi.

== Competition record ==
Year	Competition	Venue	Position	Notes
Representing Iran
2006	Asian Junior Championships	Macau, China	1st	61.52 m
2006	World Junior Championships	Beijing, China	2nd	63.00 m
2007	Universiade	Bangkok, Thailand	9th	55.57 m
2009	Universiade	Belgrade, Serbia	1st	65.33 m
2009	Asian Championships	Guangzhou, China	2nd	64.01 m
2010	West Asian Championships	Aleppo, Syria	2nd	62.34 m
2010	Asian Games	Guangzhou, China	2nd	63.46 m
2011	World Championships	Daegu, South Korea	23rd (q)	61.10 m
2012	West Asian Championships	Dubai, United Arab Emirates	1st	62.36 m
2013	Asian Championships	Pune, India	2nd	61.93 m
2013	Islamic Solidarity Games	Palembang, Indonesia	2nd	62.15 m
2014	Asian Games	Incheon, South Korea	4th	60.37 m
2017	Asian Championships	Bhubaneswar, India	5th	59.80 m

== General references ==
- Mohammad Samimi at World Athletics
