= Athletics at the 2013 Summer Universiade – Men's discus throw =

The men's discus throw event at the 2013 Summer Universiade was held on 10–12 July.

== Medalists ==
Gold	Silver	Bronze
Ronald Julião; Brazil	Giovanni Faloci; Italy	Gleb Sidorchenko; Russia

== Results ==
=== Qualification ===
Qualification: 59.50 m (Q) or at least 12 best (q) qualified for the final.

Rank	Group	Athlete	Nationality	#1	#2	#3	Result	Notes
1	B	Gleb Sidorchenko	Russia	61.87			61.87	Q
2	B	Giovanni Faloci	Italy	57.97	61.53		61.53	Q
3	A	Ronald Julião	Brazil	61.49			61.49	Q
4	B	Mahmoud Samimi	Iran	x	60.18		60.18	Q
5	A	Ivan Krasnoschenko	Russia	53.61	59.21	x	59.21	q
6	A	Traves Smikle	Jamaica	58.69	58.96	58.30	58.96	q
7	A	Przemysław Czajkowski	Poland	58.09	x	58.63	58.63	q
8	A	Federico Apolloni	Italy	57.58	55.46	56.80	57.58	q
9	B	Yuji Tsutsumi	Japan	57.54	57.09	x	57.54	q
10	B	Alexander Rose	Samoa	54.15	57.14	52.63	57.14	q
11	B	Priidu Niit	Estonia	x	53.31	55.95	55.95	q
12	A	Mark Alterman	Israel	x	53.93	55.05	55.05	q
13	B	Derrick Vicars	United States	55.00	x	53.33	55.00	
14	A	Julio César Londoño	Colombia	54.12	x	x	54.12	SB
15	B	Tadej Hribar	Slovenia	51.79	x	53.19	53.19	
16	A	Arjun	India	52.88	x	53.16	53.16	
17	B	Hesham Shalaby	Egypt	x	x	48.28	48.28	
18	B	Winston Campbell	Honduras	x	44.56	47.04	47.04	
19	A	Almughanni Khaled Mohammed	Qatar	45.54	x	46.64	46.64	
	A	Martin Stašek	Czech Republic				DNS	

=== Final ===
Rank	Athlete	Nationality	#1	#2	#3	#4	#5	#6	Result	Notes
1st place, gold medalist(s)	Ronald Julião	Brazil	60.79	60.31	62.37	63.09	63.54	62.96	63.54	
2nd place, silver medalist(s)	Giovanni Faloci	Italy	55.37	62.23	58.64	x	x	x	62.23	
3rd place, bronze medalist(s)	Gleb Sidorchenko	Russia	61.81	62.16	x	x	x	x	62.16	
4	Traves Smikle	Jamaica	59.30	59.57	x	58.60	60.91	60.01	60.91	
5	Mahmoud Samimi	Iran	58.76	x	59.09	59.66	59.76	x	59.76	
6	Ivan Krasnoschenko	Russia	55.24	54.42	59.41	58.30	x	55.40	59.41	
7	Alexander Rose	Samoa	57.09	52.49	58.64	55.86	54.15	55.06	58.64	SB
8	Yuji Tsutsumi	Japan	54.84	58.43	55.18	57.78	x	54.74	58.43	
9	Federico Apolloni	Italy	57.07	49.26	56.47				57.07	
10	Mark Alterman	Israel	55.06	54.43	53.14				55.06	
11	Priidu Niit	Estonia	x	x	51.70				51.70	
	Przemysław Czajkowski	Poland	x	x	x				NM	
