= 2013 Asian Athletics Championships – Men's discus throw =

The men's discus throw at the 2013 Asian Athletics Championships was held at the Shree Shiv Chhatrapati Sports Complex on 4 July.

== Results ==
Rank	Name	Nationality	#1	#2	#3	#4	#5	#6	Result	Notes
1st place, gold medalist(s)	Vikas Gowda	India	58.64	x	61.81	64.90	62.40	63.26	64.90	
2nd place, silver medalist(s)	Mohammad Samimi	Iran	x	56.33	61.93	55.45	x	x	61.93	
3rd place, bronze medalist(s)	Ahmed Mohammed Dheeb	Qatar	58.07	56.14	59.96	x	60.82	59.03	60.82	
4	Mahmoud Samimi	Iran	55.48	53.98	59.35	60.24	x	60.24	60.24	
5	Musaeb Al-Momani	Jordan	56.60	x	56.38	60.21	58.21	x	60.21	
6	Sultan Al-Dawoodi	Saudi Arabia	60.05	55.89	57.89	59.18	58.03	58.58	60.05	
7	Rashid Shafi Al-Dosari	Qatar	57.93	58.66	56.86	58.37	57.07	57.68	58.66	
8	Essa Al-Zenkawi	Kuwait	54.67	55.31	56.96	54.38	x	x	56.96	
9	Haidar Nasir	Iraq	50.61	x	54.05				54.05	
10	Choi Jong-Bum	South Korea	52.93	53.92	x				53.92	
11	Arjun	India	52.90	x	48.35				52.90	
12	Vikas Poonia	India	51.30	50.35	50.22				51.30	
13	Wang Yao-Hui	Chinese Taipei	x	x	50.80				50.80	
	Maksat Mammedov	Turkmenistan							DNS	
