= Vadim Hranovschi =

Moldovan discus thrower

Vadim Hranovschi (born 14 February 1983 in Camenca) is a Moldovan discus thrower. His personal best throw is 64.43 metres, achieved in May 2010 in Chișinău.

He finished eighth at the 2005 Summer Universiade. He also competed at the Olympic Games in 2004 and 2008, but failed to qualify for the final round.

== Competition record ==
Year	Competition	Venue	Position	Notes
Representing Moldova
2001	European Junior Championships	Grosseto, Italy	11th	48.97 m
2003	European U23 Championships	Bydgoszcz, Poland	16th (q)	52.52 m
2004	Olympic Games	Athens, Greece	32nd (q)	55.64 m
2005	European U23 Championships	Erfurt, Germany	4th	59.71 m
2005	Universiade	İzmir, Turkey	8th	59.48 m
2008	Olympic Games	Beijing, China	35th (q)	56.19 m
2009	Universiade	Beijing, China	20th (q)	52.83 m
