= Track and field at the 2011 Military World Games – Men's shot put =

The men's shot put event at the 2011 Military World Games was held on 21 July at the Estádio Olímpico João Havelange.

== Records ==
Prior to this competition, the existing world and CISM record were as follows:

| World Record | Randy Barnes (USA) | 23.12 | Westwood, United States | 20 May 1990 |
| CISM World Record | Paolo Dal Soglio (ITA) | 20.39 | Zagreb, Croatia | August 1999 |

== Schedule ==
| Date | Time | Round |
|---|---|---|
| 21 July 2011 | 16:30 | Final |

== Medalists ==
| Gold | Silver | Bronze |
|---|---|---|
| Andriy Semenov; Ukraine | Candy Arnd Bauer; Germany | Andrei Siniakou; Belarus |

== Results ==
=== Final ===
| Rank | Athlete | Nationality | #1 | #2 | #3 | #4 | #5 | #6 | Mark | Notes |
|---|---|---|---|---|---|---|---|---|---|---|
| 1st place, gold medalist(s) | Andriy Semenov | Ukraine | 19.40 | 19.50 | x | 18.98 | 19.69 | 20.02 | 20.02 | |
| 2nd place, silver medalist(s) | Candy Arnd Bauer | Germany | 19.00 | 19.14 | x | x | x | x | 19.14 | |
| 3rd place, bronze medalist(s) | Andrei Siniakou | Belarus | 17.94 | 18.10 | x | 17.94 | 17.93 | x | 18.10 | |
| 4 | Khalid Habash Al-Suwaidi | Qatar | 17.54 | x | 16.25 | 16.42 | 17.03 | 17.69 | 17.69 | |
| 5 | Shihao Zuo | China | 17.20 | 17.28 | 16.92 | 17.16 | x | x | 17.28 | |
| 6 | Badri Obeid | Lebanon | 16.69 | 16.58 | 16.69 | 16.29 | 16.77 | 16.94 | 16.94 | |
| 7 | Jesús Parejo | Venezuela | 16.26 | 16.49 | 16.21 | 16.69 | 16.30 | 16.29 | 16.69 | |
| 8 | Musab Ibrahim Al-Momani | Jordan | 16.35 | 16.61 | x | x | x | 15.94 | 16.61 | |
| 9 | Stephane Szuster | France | x | 16.04 | 15.82 | | | | 16.04 | |
| 10 | Khalid Kidallah | Saudi Arabia | 15.28 | x | 15.79 | | | | 15.79 | |
| 11 | Mohamed Abdulqadri | Saudi Arabia | 15.42 | 15.58 | 14.13 | | | | 15.58 | |
| 12 | Issa Moussa | Mali | 14.92 | 15.41 | 15.00 | | | | 15.41 | |
| 13 | Lukas Jost | Switzerland | 14.55 | 14.99 | 15.18 | | | | 15.18 | |
| 14 | Muhammad Ashraf Ali | Pakistan | 15.11 | 15.05 | 14.99 | | | | 15.11 | |
| 15 | Rashid Almeqbaali | United Arab Emirates | 15.05 | x | x | | | | 15.05 | |
| 16 | Oleksii Semenov | Ukraine | 14.70 | DNF | | | | | 14.70 | |
| 17 | Adama Camara | Senegal | 13.18 | 13.03 | 13.47 | | | | 13.47 | |
| 18 | Bueno Chacon | Colombia | x | x | 13.31 | | | | 13.31 | |
| | Essowounamondom Tchalim | Togo | | | | | | | DNS | |
