= Bertrand Vili =

French athlete

Bertrand Vili (born 6 September 1983) is a French former track and field athlete who competed in the discus throw. He represented France at the 2009 World Championships in Athletics and was a silver medallist at the 2005 Jeux de la Francophonie. He was a double shot put/discus gold medallist at the 2001 South Pacific Mini Games and also won javelin throw silver. He won the gold medal in the discus at the 2007 Pacific Games in a games record of 58.31 m. He successfully defended that title four years later at the 2011 Pacific Games, held in his native New Caledonia. He has a personal best of 63.66 m (208 ft 10 1/4 in) and is the New Caledonian national record holder.

He won three straight national titles at the French Athletics Championships from 2007 to 2009. He has also won at the Australian Athletics Championships (2009) and won a shot put and two discus titles at the New Zealand Athletics Championships between 2002 and 2004.

In 2006 he wrote off his car in an accident while narrowly beneath the drink-drive limit. He was married to fellow athlete Valerie Adams from 2004 to 2010, with Adams citing Vili's drinking as a cause of their marital breakdown in her autobiography. His cousin Laurent Vili is a former shot putter and rugby player.

== International competitions ==
Year	Competition	Venue	Position	Event	Notes
2001	South Pacific Mini Games	Middlegate, Norfolk Island	1st	Shot put	16.81 m
2001	South Pacific Mini Games	Middlegate, Norfolk Island	1st	Discus throw	49.41 m
2001	South Pacific Mini Games	Middlegate, Norfolk Island	2nd	Javelin throw	63.78 m
2002	World Junior Championships	Kingston, Jamaica	5th	Shot put	20.12 m
2002	World Junior Championships	Kingston, Jamaica	11th	Discus throw	57.87 m
2003	European U23 Championships	Bydgoszcz, Poland	7th	Discus throw	54.88 m
2005	European U23 Championships	Erfurt, Germany	11th	Discus throw	55.40 m
2005	Jeux e la Francophonie	Niamey, Niger	2nd	Discus throw	54.05 m
2007	Pacific Games	Apia, Samoa	1st	Discus throw	58.31 m GR
2007	Pacific Games	Apia, Samoa	2nd	Hammer throw	55.73 m
2009	World Championships	Berlin, Germany	18th (q)	Discus throw	60.88 m
2011	Pacific Games	Nouméa, New Caledonia	1st	Discus throw	54.12 m

- Positions in qualifying rounds (q) are overall positions in the round including all groups.

== National titles ==
- French Athletics Championships
  - Discus throw: 2007, 2008, 2009
- New Zealand Athletics Championships
  - Shot put: 2002
  - Discus throw: 2003, 2004
- Australian Athletics Championships
  - Discus throw: 2009

== See also ==
- List of discus throw national champions (men)
- List of Australian athletics champions (men)
