= Gulustan Mahmood =

Iraqi sprinter

Medal record

Women's athletics

Representing Iraq

Asian Indoor Games
Silver medal – second place	2009 Hanoi	400 m

Asian Championships
Disqualified	2011 Kobe	400 m
Disqualified	2011 Kobe	4×400 m relay

Gulustan Mahmood Ieso (born 1 August 1991), also known as Kolestan Mahmoud, is an Iraqi track and field athlete who competes in sprinting events. She holds a number of Iraqi records and helped win her country's first ever women's medals at the Asian Athletics Championships in 2011. She lost these medals as her doping sample at that competition came back positive for the banned stimulant methylhexaneamine, receiving a one-year ban for the infraction.

Following in the footsteps of Dana Hussein Abdul-Razzaq and Alaa Jassim, her first major appearances came in 2009 when she won the 400 metres and 4×400 metres relay gold medals at the Arab Athletics Championships, as well finishing as runner-up in the 200 metres. Ieso represented her country in the two individual sprints at the 2009 Asian Athletics Championships. At the 2009 Asian Indoor Games she set two Iraqi records, running 7.53 seconds for the 60 metres (finishing sixth) and an indoor record of 53.75 seconds for the 400 m – a time which brought her the silver medal in the event, behind Chen Jingwen. She then helped the Iraqi women's 400 m relay team to a third national record of 3:59.01 minutes.

Ieso won the 400 m and 800 metres titles at the 2010 Asian Junior Athletics Championships. She went on to reach the semi-finals of the 400 m at the 2010 World Junior Championships in Athletics. With a team featuring Zhilan Salah Mahmood, Dana Hussein Abdul-Razzaq and Alaa Jassim, she won the West Asian Championships with a new national relay record of 3:43.60 minutes. Ieso ran in both the 100 m and 400 m relay events at the 2010 Asian Games, as well as performing in the heats of the individual 400 m. Highlighting the low development of women's athletics in Iraq, a mark of 33.57 m in the javelin throw at a local meeting brought Ieso another national record.

In the 2011 season she set a personal best in the 100 metres at the national junior championships, recording a time of 12.02 seconds. She was chosen to compete at the 2011 Asian Athletics Championships: she set a 200 m personal best of 24.25 seconds in the heats, but was disqualified in the finals. She had more success over the 400 m distance as she finished quickly to set a personal record of 52.80 seconds and take the silver medal behind Olga Tereshkova – this was the first women's medal Iraq had ever won in at the Asian Championships. She helped double that tally later in the competition as Iraq's 400 m relay team won the bronze medal in another Iraqi record time of 3:41.91 minutes. However, she lost both her individual and relay medals as her doping sample at that competition came back positive for the banned stimulant methylhexaneamine, receiving a one-year ban for the infraction.
