= Jesús Parejo =

Venezuelan track and field athlete

Personal information
- Born: 10 March 1981 (age 45)

Sport
- Sport: Track and field
Medal record
Representing Venezuela
CAC Games
Silver medal – second place	2010 Mayagüez	Discus throw
South American Championships
Bronze medal – third place	2011 Buenos Aires	Discus throw
CAC Championships
Bronze medal – third place	2008 Cali	Discus throw

Jesús Parejo (born 10 March 1981) is a Venezuelan former track and field athlete who competes in the shot put and discus throw. He holds personal bests of 17.56 m (57 ft 7 1/4 in) and 57.58 m (188 ft 10 3/4 in) for those events. His greatest achievements were a discus silver medal at the 2010 Central American and Caribbean Games and bronze medals at the 2011 South American Championships in Athletics and 2008 Central American and Caribbean Championships in Athletics.

He also represented his country at the 2011 Pan American Games, 2011 Military World Games, and the 2014 South American Games, and was a three-time participant at the Ibero-American Championships in Athletics. He was a medallist at three straight editions of both the Bolivarian Games and ALBA Games.

A five-time national champion, he was Venezuela's top discus thrower from around 2005 to 2014, following on from Héctor Hurtado.

== Personal bests ==
- Shot put – 17.56 m (57 ft 7 1/4 in) (2011)
- Discus throw – 57.58 m (188 ft 10 3/4 in) (2008)
- Hammer throw – 59.32 m (194 ft 7 1/4 in) (2005)

All information from All-Athletics profile.

== International competitions ==
Year	Competition	Venue	Position	Event	Notes
2000	South American Junior Championships	São Leopoldo, Brazil	3rd	Discus throw	45.83 m
2001	Bolivarian Games	Ambato, Ecuador	3rd	Hammer throw	53.84 m
2003	South American Championships	Barquisimeto, Venezuela	4th	Discus throw	53.90 m
2003	CAC Championships	St. George's, Grenada	4th	Discus throw	51.85 m
2005	Bolivarian Games	Armenia, Colombia	4th	Shot put	16.57 m
2005	Bolivarian Games	Armenia, Colombia	1st	Discus throw	54.65 m
2005	South American Championships	Cali, Colombia	5th	Discus throw	52.33 m
2007	ALBA Games	Caracas, Venezuela	3rd	Discus throw	53.43 m
2007	South American Championships	São Paulo, Brazil	4th	Shot put	53.30 m
2008	CAC Championships	Cali, Colombia	3rd	Discus throw	56.49 m
2008	Ibero-American Championships	Iquique, Chile	5th	Discus throw	56.43 m
2009	ALBA Games	Havana, Cuba	3rd	Discus throw	56.44 m
2009	CAC Championships	Havana, Cuba	4th	Discus throw	55.92 m
2009	Bolivarian Games	Sucre, Bolivia	3rd	Shot put	17.54 m
2009	Bolivarian Games	Sucre, Bolivia	1st	Discus throw	55.98 m
2009	South American Championships	Lima, Peru	6th	Shot put	16.82 m
2009	South American Championships	Lima, Peru	4th	Discus throw	54.72 m
2010	CAC Games	Mayagüez, Puerto Rico	2nd	Discus throw	54.88 m
2010	Ibero-American Championships	San Fernando, Spain	9th	Discus throw	53.40 m
2011	South American Championships	Buenos Aires, Argentina	3rd	Discus throw	57.42 m
2011	CAC Championships	Mayagüez, Puerto Rico	4th	Discus throw	55.00 m
2011	ALBA Games	Barquisimeto, Venezuela	2nd	Shot put	17.56 m
2011	ALBA Games	Barquisimeto, Venezuela	2nd	Discus throw	54.85 m
2011	Pan American Games	Guadalajara, Mexico	8th	Discus throw	55.35 m
2011	Military World Games	Rio de Janeiro, Brazil	7th	Shot put	16.69 m
2011	Military World Games	Rio de Janeiro, Brazil	9th	Discus throw	54.59 m
2012	Ibero-American Championships	Barquisimeto, Venezuela	8th	Discus throw	53.88 m
2013	Bolivarian Games	Trujillo, Peru	2nd	Discus throw	55.85 m
2013	South American Championships	Cartagena, Colombia	6th	Discus throw	53.53 m
2014	CAC Games	Xalapa, Mexico	7th	Shot put	16.05 m
2014	CAC Games	Xalapa, Mexico	5th	Discus throw	53.87 m
2014	South American Games	Santiago, Chile	5th	Discus throw	55.06 m
