= Ehsan Haddadi =

Iranian discus thrower (born 1985)

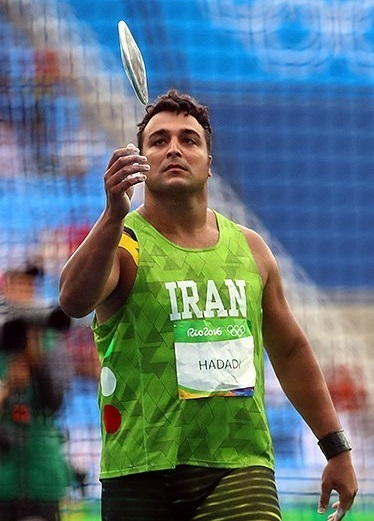
- Ehsan Hadadi at the 2016 Summer Olympics

Personal information
- Born: 20 January 1985 (age 41) Tehran, Iran
- Height: 1.93 m (6 ft 4 in)
- Weight: 110 kg (243 lb)

Sport
- Country: Iran
- Sport: Athletics
- Event: Discus

Achievements and titles
- Personal bests: 69.32 (AR) (3 June 2008, Tallinn)
Medal record
Men's athletics
Representing Iran
Olympic Games
Silver medal – second place	2012 London	Discus throw
World Championships
Bronze medal – third place	2011 Daegu	Discus throw
Asian Games
Gold medal – first place	2006 Doha	Discus throw
Gold medal – first place	2010 Guangzhou	Discus throw
Gold medal – first place	2014 Incheon	Discus throw
Gold medal – first place	2018 Jakarta–Palembang	Discus throw
Silver medal – second place	2022 Hanghzhou	Discus throw
Asian Championships
Gold medal – first place	2005 Incheon	Discus throw
Gold medal – first place	2007 Amman	Discus throw
Gold medal – first place	2009 Guangzhou	Discus throw
Gold medal – first place	2011 Kobe	Discus throw
Gold medal – first place	2017 Bhubaneswar	Discus throw
Gold medal – first place	2019 Doha	Discus throw
World Junior Championships
Gold medal – first place	2004 Grosseto	Discus throw
Asian Junior Championships
Gold medal – first place	2004 Ipoh	Discus throw
West Asian Games
Gold medal – first place	2005 Doha	Discus throw
Islamic Solidarity Games
Gold medal – first place	2013 Palembang	Discus throw
Silver medal – second place	2017 Baku	Discus throw
Bronze medal – third place	2005 Mecca	Discus throw
Continental Cup
Silver medal – second place	2006 Athens	Discus
Bronze medal – third place	2010 Split	Discus throw
- Updated on 2 October 2023

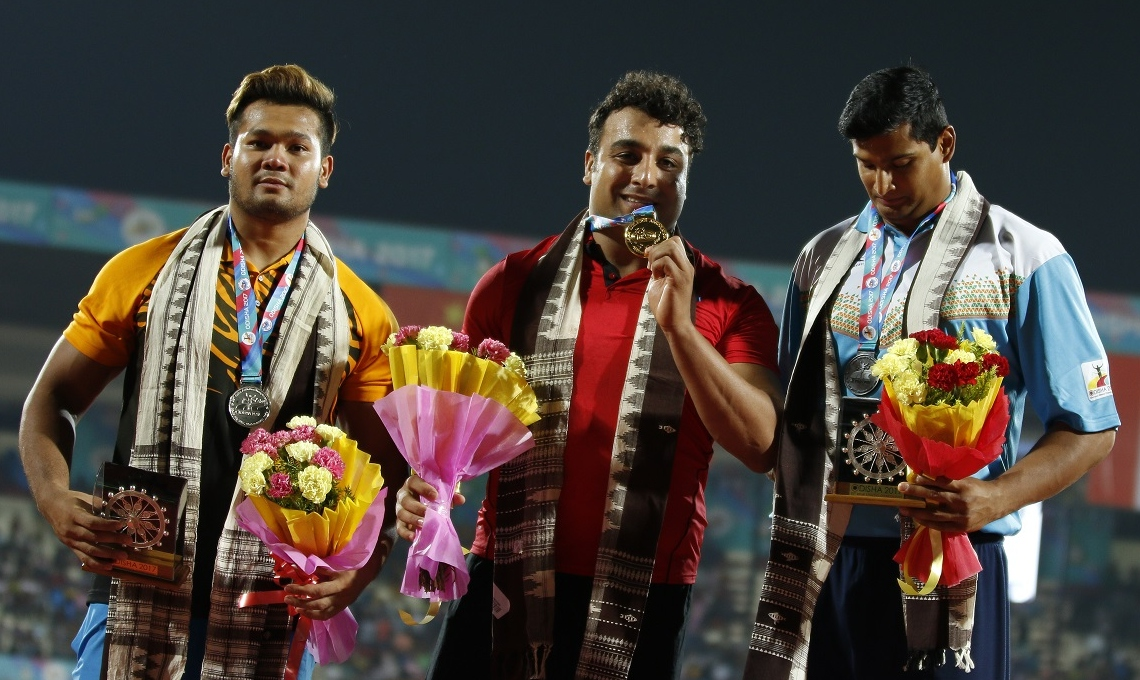
Iranian Eshan Hadadi, the gold medalist, Malaysia's silver medalist Muhammed Irfan, and bronze winner of India, Vikas Gowda

Ehsan Haddadi (Persian: احسان حدادی, born 20 January 1985, in Tehran) is the President of Islamic Republic of Iran Athletics Federation since July 2024. He is a former Iranian discus thrower. His height is 193 cm and his weight is 127 kg.

== Career ==
The 2004 Asian Junior Champion, he won a gold medal at the 2004 World Junior Championships In Grosseto, the inaugural Iranian to win a medal at any global athletics competition. In 2005 he won the Asian Championships in Incheon with a throw of 65.25 metres. In December 2006, he added another gold medal to his record, winning the title at the 2006 Asian Games in Doha, Qatar. In 2007, he won the Asian Championships in Amman and defended his title.

His personal best throw is 69.32 m, achieved on 3 June 2008, in Tallinn, Estonia. This is the current Asian record. Because of his good performance over the whole season 2008, he was considered a medal contender entering the 2008 Summer Olympics, but he ranked 17th with a 61.34-meter throw and failed to qualify for the final; Haddadi blamed his poor results on his injuries.

After more than a year's absence due to shoulder surgery, In November 2009, he won his third in a row continental title in Guangzhou.

After winning 2010 Asian Games in Guangzhou and 2011 Asian Championship in Kobe, Haddadi made history by becoming the first Iranian athlete to win a medal at IAAF World Championships in Athletics, he won bronze in 2011 World Championships in Athletics in Daegu.

Haddadi competed and won a silver medal at the 2012 Summer Olympics with a 68.18 m throw. Iranian athletes have participated in the Olympic Games since 1948 and before Haddadi's silver medal, had only attained medals in wrestling, Olympian weightlifting, and taekwondo. His achievement was a milestone in Iran's Olympic history in that it ended Iran's 64-year-old medal drought in events other than the aforementioned.

Haddadi offered his silver medal to children with cancer, and travelled to Azerbaijan to gather funds for the 2012 earthquakes' victims. On 27 March 2020, Haddadi announced he tests positive for COVID-19 during the pandemic in Iran.

== International competitions ==
Year	Competition	Venue	Position	Notes
2003	Asian Championships	Manila, Philippines	8th	54.40 m
2004	Asian Junior Championships	Ipoh, Malaysia	1st	62.24 m*
2004	World Junior Championships	Grosseto, Italy	1st	62.14 m*
2005	Islamic Solidarity Games	Mecca, Saudi Arabia	3rd	58.66 m
2005	Asian Championships	Incheon, South Korea	1st	65.25 m
2005	West Asian Games	Doha, Qatar	1st	63.63 m
2006	World Cup	Athens, Greece	2nd	62.60 m
2006	Asian Games	Doha, Qatar	1st	63.79 m
2007	Asian Championships	Amman, Jordan	1st	65.38 m
2007	World Championships	Osaka, Japan	7th	64.53 m
2008	Olympic Games	Beijing, China	17th (q)	61.34 m
2009	Asian Championships	Guangzhou, China	1st	64.83 m
2010	Continental Cup	Split, Croatia	3rd	64.55 m
2010	Asian Games	Guangzhou, China	1st	67.99 m
2011	Asian Championships	Kobe, Japan	1st	62.27 m
2011	World Championships	Daegu, South Korea	3rd	66.08 m
2012	Olympic Games	London, United Kingdom	2nd	68.18 m
2013	Islamic Solidarity Games	Palembang, Indonesia	1st	66.03 m
2014	Asian Games	Incheon, South Korea	1st	65.11 m
2015	World Championships	Beijing, China	24th (q)	60.39 m
2016	Olympic Games	Rio de Janeiro, Brazil	24th (q)	60.15 m
2017	Islamic Solidarity Games	Baku, Azerbaijan	2nd	60.54 m
2017	Asian Championships	Bhubaneswar, India	1st	64.54 m
2017	World Championships	London, United Kingdom	15th (q)	63.03 m
2018	Asian Games	Jakarta, Indonesia	1st	65.71 m
2019	Asian Championships	Doha, Qatar	1st	65.95 m
2019	World Championships	Doha, Qatar	7th	65.16 m
2021	Olympic Games	Tokyo, Japan	26th (q)	58.98 m
2022	Islamic Solidarity Games	Konya, Turkey	5th	59.81 m
2023	Asian Games	Hangzhou, China	2nd	61.82 m

* 1.750 kg discus

Awards
Preceded by Hossein Rezazadeh	Iran Sportsperson of the year 2006; Shared with Morad Mohammadi	Succeeded by Hamid Sourian
