= 2002 World Junior Championships in Athletics – Men's discus throw =

The men's discus throw event at the 2002 World Junior Championships in Athletics was held in Kingston, Jamaica, at National Stadium on 17 and 18 July. A 1.75 kg (junior implement) discus was used.

== Medalists ==
Gold	Wu Tao; China
Silver	Dmitriy Sivakov; Belarus
Bronze	Michał Hodun; Poland

== Results ==
=== Final ===
18 July

Rank	Name	Nationality	Attempts						Result	Notes
Rank	Name	Nationality	1	2	3	4	5	6	Result	Notes
1st place, gold medalist(s)	Wu Tao	China	x	59.68	64.51	x	62.95	x	64.51	
2nd place, silver medalist(s)	Dmitriy Sivakov	Belarus	x	59.54	62.00	61.62	60.52	x	62.00	
3rd place, bronze medalist(s)	Michał Hodun	Poland	60.60	61.74	60.79	61.35	x	58.49	61.74	
4	Khalid Habash Al-Suwaidi	Qatar	60.02	60.56	61.21	x	x	x	61.21	
5	Daniel Vanek	Slovakia	x	53.87	60.86	x	58.12	x	60.86	
6	Piotr Małachowski	Poland	58.16	60.46	x	57.03	57.12	57.78	60.46	
7	Märt Israel	Estonia	57.58	59.43	58.54	57.99	55.68	x	59.43	
8	Sean Shields	United States	53.79	x	59.21	x	x	x	59.21	
9	Kris Coene	Belgium	57.89	59.18	58.66				59.18	
10	Omar El-Ghazaly	Egypt	58.20	56.28	57.88				58.20	
11	Bertrand Vili	France	x	57.87	57.17				57.87	
12	Vikas Gowda	India	50.46	54.46	x				54.46	

=== Qualifications ===
17 Jul

==== Group A ====
Rank	Name	Nationality	Attempts			Result	Notes
Rank	Name	Nationality	1	2	3	Result	Notes
1	Wu Tao	China	x	x	61.03	61.03	Q
2	Khalid Habash Al-Suwaidi	Qatar	59.90	-	-	59.90	Q
3	Omar El-Ghazaly	Egypt	54.84	58.81	x	58.81	q
4	Daniel Vanek	Slovakia	52.64	58.38	58.50	58.50	q
5	Sean Shields	United States	55.81	57.74	x	57.74	q
6	Kris Coene	Belgium	57.31	x	x	57.31	q
7	Piotr Małachowski	Poland	56.15	56.68	57.18	57.18	q
8	Robert Harting	Germany	x	56.23	55.86	56.23	
9	Edis Elkasević	Croatia	x	55.22	x	55.22	
10	Timothy Driesen	Australia	51.29	54.85	54.75	54.85	
11	Taavi Peetre	Estonia	53.56	53.90	x	53.90	
12	Gunnar Åsvenstad	Norway	51.29	48.74	49.68	51.29	
13	Norbert Gulyás	Hungary	x	50.58	x	50.58	
14	Pedro Cuesta	Spain	47.81	50.28	48.73	50.28	
15	Justin Andre	Guam	46.69	43.86	43.83	46.69	
16	Kimani Kirton	Jamaica	x	x	46.52	46.52	
17	Eric Matthias	British Virgin Islands	44.23	x	x	44.23	

==== Group B ====
Rank	Name	Nationality	Attempts			Result	Notes
Rank	Name	Nationality	1	2	3	Result	Notes
1	Michał Hodun	Poland	53.07	60.84	-	60.84	Q
2	Dmitriy Sivakov	Belarus	56.55	56.37	58.07	58.07	q
3	Bertrand Vili	France	57.81	x	56.64	57.81	q
4	Vikas Gowda	India	55.97	56.93	52.38	56.93	q
5	Märt Israel	Estonia	55.16	49.37	56.47	56.47	q
6	Gustavo de Mendonça	Brazil	51.63	x	55.39	55.39	
7	Tobias Obermaier	Germany	54.36	x	52.70	54.36	
8	Germán Lauro	Argentina	53.15	53.69	49.29	53.69	
9	Michael Robertson	United States	53.28	51.46	53.58	53.58	
10	Martin Marić	Croatia	52.41	53.03	51.91	53.03	
11	Erik Cadée	Netherlands	52.95	x	x	52.95	
12	Lajos Tóth	Hungary	x	x	51.71	51.71	
13	Felipe Silva	Portugal	x	45.71	51.12	51.12	
14	Vasilios Katsohirákis	Greece	50.74	x	x	50.74	
15	Sultan Al-Dawoodi	Saudi Arabia	50.27	x	x	50.27	
16	Andrey Semenov	Ukraine	44.21	x	48.38	48.38	
17	Kerim Begliyev	Turkmenistan	x	41.89	42.31	42.31	

== Participation ==
According to an unofficial count, 34 athletes from 28 countries participated in the event.

- Argentina (1)
- Australia (1)
- Belarus (1)
- Belgium (1)
- Brazil (1)
- British Virgin Islands (1)
- China (1)
- Croatia (2)
- Egypt (1)
- Estonia (2)
- France (1)
- Germany (2)
- Greece (1)
- Guam (1)
- Hungary (2)
- India (1)
- Jamaica (1)
- Netherlands (1)
- Norway (1)
- Poland (2)
- Portugal (1)
- Qatar (1)
- Saudi Arabia (1)
- Slovakia (1)
- Spain (1)
- Turkmenistan (1)
- Ukraine (1)
- United States (2)
