= Athletics at the 2010 Asian Games – Men's discus throw =

Men's discus throw at the 2010 Asian Games
- Venue: Aoti Main Stadium
- Date: 24 November 2010
- Competitors: 11 from 9 nations

Medalists
gold medal	Ehsan Haddadi	Iran
silver medal	Mohammad Samimi	Iran
bronze medal	Vikas Gowda	India

The men's discus throw event at the 2010 Asian Games was held at the Aoti Main Stadium, Guangzhou, China on 24 November.

== Schedule ==
All times are China Standard Time (UTC+08:00)

Date	Time	Event
Wednesday, 24 November 2010	17:15	Final

== Records ==
Prior to this competition, the existing world, Asian and Games records were as follows.

World Record	Jürgen Schult (GDR)	74.08	Neubrandenburg, East Germany	6 June 1986
Asian Record	Ehsan Haddadi (IRI)	69.32	Tallinn, Estonia	3 June 2008
Games Record	Li Shaojie (CHN)	64.58	Bangkok, Thailand	17 December 1998

== Results ==
Rank	Athlete	Attempt						Result	Notes
Rank	Athlete	1	2	3	4	5	6	Result	Notes
1st place, gold medalist(s)	Ehsan Haddadi (IRI)	63.50	65.07	65.23	62.21	67.99	X	67.99	GR
2nd place, silver medalist(s)	Mohammad Samimi (IRI)	63.46	63.08	61.50	X	62.06	X	63.46	
3rd place, bronze medalist(s)	Vikas Gowda (IND)	62.27	63.13	62.33	62.97	62.72	62.43	63.13	
4	Rashid Shafi Al-Dosari (QAT)	X	60.98	X	X	X	59.46	60.98	
5	Shigeo Hatakeyama (JPN)	53.44	53.07	55.87	55.47	X	56.89	56.89	
6	Haidar Nasir (IRQ)	50.99	54.87	X	54.59	55.44	X	55.44	
7	Choi Jong-bum (KOR)	52.51	54.58	X	54.73	54.00	52.83	54.73	
8	Essa Al-Zenkawi (IOC)	54.19	X	53.16				54.19	
9	Wang Yao-hui (TPE)	X	53.97	X				53.97	
10	Kvanchai Numsomboon (THA)	49.85	50.77	51.31				51.31	
DQ	Ahmed Dheeb (QAT)	64.56	63.58	63.29	X	60.16	63.61	~~64.56~~	

- Ahmed Dheeb of Qatar originally won the silver medal, but was later disqualified after he tested positive for Testosterone.
