= 2009 Asian Athletics Championships – Men's discus throw =

The men's discus throw event at the 2009 Asian Athletics Championships was held at the Guangdong Olympic Stadium on November 14.

== Results ==
| Rank | Athlete | Nationality | #1 | #2 | #3 | #4 | #5 | #6 | Result | Notes |
|---|---|---|---|---|---|---|---|---|---|---|
| 1st place, gold medalist(s) | Ehsan Hadadi | Iran | 57.70 | 62.04 | 64.83 | x | x | x | 64.83 | |
| 2nd place, silver medalist(s) | Mohammad Samimi | Iran | 60.51 | 61.40 | 62.86 | 61.71 | x | 64.01 | 64.01 | |
| 3rd place, bronze medalist(s) | Wu Tao | China | 57.53 | 58.56 | 57.92 | x | x | 59.27 | 59.27 | |
| 4 | Jabreen Haider | Iraq | 58.00 | x | x | 56.66 | 56.02 | 54.61 | 58.00 | |
| 5 | Ahmed Mohamed Dheeb | Qatar | 54.37 | 54.23 | 54.67 | 53.00 | 54.89 | 55.74 | 55.74 | |
| 6 | Shigeo Hatakeyama | Japan | 55.73 | 55.07 | 55.73 | 55.45 | x | 54.67 | 55.73 | |
| 7 | Wang Yao-hui | Chinese Taipei | 49.58 | 55.39 | x | 54.29 | x | x | 55.39 | |
| 8 | Choi Jong-beom | South Korea | 54.37 | x | x | x | x | x | 54.37 | |
| 9 | Wansawang Sawasdee | Thailand | 48.16 | x | 45.33 | | | | 48.16 | |
| 10 | Wong Scott | Singapore | 42.01 | 42.63 | 42.70 | | | | 42.70 | |
| 11 | Mohammad Yazid Yatimi Yusof | Brunei | 40.46 | 40.33 | x | | | | 40.46 | |
| | Wu Jian | China | x | x | x | | | | NM | |
| | Sultan Al-Hebshi | Saudi Arabia | | | | | | | DNS | |
