= Musaeb Al-Momani =

Jordanian athlete

Personal information
- Full name: Musaeb Ibrahim Mohammad Al-Momani
- Born: 28 August 1986 (age 39)

Sport
- Sport: Athletics
- Events: Discus throw, shot put

Musaeb Ibrahim Mohammad Al-Momani (born 28 August 1986) is a Jordanian athlete competing in the discus throw and shot put. He represented his country in the discus at the 2013 World Championships without qualifying for the final. In addition, won a bronze medal at the 2019 Asian Championships.

== International competitions ==
Year	Competition	Venue	Position	Event	Notes
Representing Jordan
2003	World Youth Championships	Sherbrooke, Canada	13th (q)	Discus throw (1.5 kg)	53.31 m
2005	Islamic Solidarity Games	Mecca, Saudi Arabia	8th	Discus throw	54.26 m
2007	Asian Championships	Amman, Jordan	9th	Shot put	15.88 m
2007	Asian Championships	Amman, Jordan	7th	Discus throw	53.94 m
2007	Pan Arab Games	Cairo, Egypt	6th	Discus throw	51.45 m
2011	Asian Championships	Kobe, Japan	7th	Shot put	17.44 m
2011	Asian Championships	Kobe, Japan	5th	Discus throw	54.49 m
2011	Military World Games	Rio de Janeiro, Brazil	8th	Shot put	16.61 m
2011	Military World Games	Rio de Janeiro, Brazil	3rd	Discus throw	60.97 m
2011	Arab Championships	Al Ain, United Arab Emirates	3rd	Shot put	17.18 m
2011	Arab Championships	Al Ain, United Arab Emirates	3rd	Discus throw	54.08 m
2011	Pan Arab Games	Doha, Qatar	6th	Shot put	16.68 m
2011	Pan Arab Games	Doha, Qatar	3rd	Discus throw	58.95 m
2012	West Asian Championships	Dubai, United Arab Emirates	4th	Shot put	17.86 m
2012	West Asian Championships	Dubai, United Arab Emirates	4th	Discus throw	58.84 m
2013	Asian Championships	Pune, India	12th	Shot put	17.75 m
2013	Asian Championships	Pune, India	5th	Discus throw	60.21 m
2013	Arab Championships	Doha, Qatar	5th	Shot put	17.74 m
2013	Arab Championships	Doha, Qatar	3rd	Discus throw	60.13 m
2013	World Championships	Moscow, Russia	21st (q)	Discus throw	59.38 m
2015	Military World Games	Mungyeong, South Korea	8th	Shot put	17.79 m
2015	Military World Games	Mungyeong, South Korea	11th	Discus throw	53.97 m
2017	Arab Championships	Radès, Tunisia	3rd	Shot put	16.85 m
2017	Arab Championships	Radès, Tunisia	4th	Discus throw	56.84 m
2017	Asian Indoor and Martial Arts Games	Ashgabat, Turkmenistan	16th	Shot put	15.81 m
2018	West Asian Championships	Amman, Jordan	2nd	Shot put	17.40 m
2018	West Asian Championships	Amman, Jordan	1st	Discus throw	54.07 m
2019	Asian Championships	Doha, Qatar	13th	Shot put	16.00 m
2019	Asian Championships	Doha, Qatar	3rd	Discus throw	58.27 m
2022	Islamic Solidarity Games	Konya, Turkey	8th	Shot put	17.48 m
2022	Islamic Solidarity Games	Konya, Turkey	7th	Discus throw	56.41 m
2023	West Asian Championships	Doha, Qatar	4th	Shot put	16.43 m
2023	West Asian Championships	Doha, Qatar	3rd	Discus throw	52.44 m
2023	Arab Games	Oran, Algeria	3rd	Shot put	17.18 m
2023	Arab Games	Oran, Algeria	5th	Discus throw	54.80 m
2023	Asian Games	Hangzhou, China	12th	Shot put	15.67 m
2023	Asian Games	Hangzhou, China	7th	Discus throw	54.79 m

== Personal bests ==
Outdoors

- Shot put – 18.33 (Amman 2012) NR
- Discus throw – 62.64 (Amman 2012) NR

Indoors

- Shot put – 15.81 (Ashgabat 2017) NR
