= Athletics at the 2014 Asian Games – Men's discus throw =

Men's discus throw at the 2014 Asian Games
- Venue: Incheon Asiad Main Stadium
- Dates: 30 September 2014
- Competitors: 14 from 11 nations

Medalists
gold medal	Ehsan Haddadi	Iran
silver medal	Vikas Gowda	India
bronze medal	Ahmed Dheeb	Qatar

The men's discus throw event at the 2014 Asian Games was held at the Incheon Asiad Main Stadium, Incheon, South Korea on 30 September.

== Schedule ==
All times are Korea Standard Time (UTC+09:00)

Date	Time	Event
Tuesday, 30 September 2014	18:40	Final

== Records ==
Prior to this competition, the existing world, Asian and Games records were as follows.

World Record	Jürgen Schult (GDR)	74.08	Neubrandenburg, East Germany	6 June 1986
Asian Record	Ehsan Haddadi (IRI)	69.32	Tallinn, Estonia	3 June 2008
Games Record	Ehsan Haddadi (IRI)	67.99	Guangzhou, China	24 November 2010

== Results ==
Rank	Athlete	Attempt						Result	Notes
Rank	Athlete	1	2	3	4	5	6	Result	Notes
1st place, gold medalist(s)	Ehsan Haddadi (IRI)	56.37	65.11	X	64.89	63.77	64.47	65.11	
2nd place, silver medalist(s)	Vikas Gowda (IND)	59.52	62.58	60.77	X	X	X	62.58	
3rd place, bronze medalist(s)	Ahmed Dheeb (QAT)	58.43	57.75	X	57.29	59.06	61.25	61.25	
4	Mohammad Samimi (IRI)	X	X	60.37	X	X	57.56	60.37	
5	Wu Jian (CHN)	54.26	X	56.96	58.82	56.49	58.38	58.82	
6	Sultan Al-Dawoodi (KSA)	57.60	X	X	X	56.83	58.31	58.31	
7	Rashid Shafi Al-Dosari (QAT)	56.12	56.79	X	56.14	X	X	56.79	
8	Wu Tao (CHN)	X	56.67	X	X	55.89	X	56.67	
9	Essa Al-Zenkawi (KUW)	55.84	55.58	56.57				56.57	
10	Mustafa Kadhim (IRQ)	X	55.21	X				55.21	
11	Choi Jong-bum (KOR)	53.40	54.30	54.12				54.30	
12	Irfan Shamsuddin (MAS)	50.91	53.86	53.59				53.86	
13	Saber Al-Meheiri (UAE)	50.05	X	48.99				50.05	
14	Wang Yao-hui (TPE)	X	X	49.14				49.14	
