= 2005 Asian Athletics Championships – Men's discus throw =

The men's discus throw event at the 2005 Asian Athletics Championships was held in Incheon, South Korea on September 1.

== Results ==
Rank	Name	Nationality	#1	#2	#3	#4	#5	#6	Result	Notes
1st place, gold medalist(s)	Ehsan Haddadi	Iran	65.25	x	63.12	x	62.74	x	65.25	AR
2nd place, silver medalist(s)	Vikas Gowda	India							62.84	
3rd place, bronze medalist(s)	Anil Kumar	India							59.95	
4	Abbas Samimi	Iran							59.08	
5	Tulake Nuermaimaiti	China							58.02	
6	Sultan Al-Dawoodi	Saudi Arabia							56.62	
7	Shigeo Hatakeyama	Japan							54.93	
8	Choi Jong-Bum	South Korea							54.77	
9	James Wong Tuck Yim	Singapore							53.29	
10	Chang Ming-huang	Chinese Taipei							52.75	
11	Abdullah Al-Shoumari	Saudi Arabia							52.50	
12	Ahmed Mohamed Dheeb	Qatar							51.18	
13	Yevgeniy Labutov	Kazakhstan							49.80	
14	Dashdendev Makhashiri	Mongolia							42.12	SB
	Wu Tao	China							NM	
