= 2011 Asian Athletics Championships – Men's discus throw =

The Men's discus throw event took place on July 7, 2011, at the Kobe Universiade Memorial Stadium.

== Medalists ==
Gold	Ehsan Hadadi; Iran
Silver	Vikas Gowda; India
Bronze	Wu Jian; China

== Records ==
World record	Jürgen Schult (GDR)	74.08	Neubrandenburg, East Germany	6 June 1986
Asian record	Ehsan Haddadi (IRI)	69.32	Tallinn, Estonia	3 June 2008
Championship record	Ehsan Haddadi (IRI)	65.38	Amman, Jordan	2007

== Results ==
=== Final ===
The gold medal of the event was won by the Asian record holder Ehsan Haddadi of Iran, with the best throw of 62.27 m.

Rank	Athlete	Nationality	#1	#2	#3	#4	#5	#6	Result
1st place, gold medalist(s)	Ehsan Haddadi	Iran	58.63	60.84	x	62.27	60.71	61.21	62.27
2nd place, silver medalist(s)	Vikas Gowda	India	58.88	57.90	60.99	59.93	61.58	58.37	61.58
3rd place, bronze medalist(s)	Wu Jian	China	50.57	52.97	55.56	x	54.53	56.61	56.61
4	Mahmoud Samimi	Iran	51.86	x	52.70	x	56.22	55.56	56.22
5	Musab Momani	Jordan	53.05	x	53.90	54.49	x	52.22	54.49
6	Shigeo Hatakeyama	Japan	51.42	54.11	50.99	x	51.00	53.07	54.11
7	Hamid Manssour	Syria	52.05	x	52.02	x	51.66	x	52.02
8	Haider Jabreen	Iraq	50.07	50.26	51.25	x	x	x	51.25
9	Shiro Kobayashi	Japan	45.98	x	49.95				49.95
10	Yao-Hui Wang	Chinese Taipei	48.63	×	×				48.63
