= 2019 Asian Athletics Championships – Men's discus throw =

Men's discus throw at the 2019 Asian Athletics Championships
- Venue: Khalifa International Stadium
- Location: Doha, Qatar
- Dates: 21 April
- Competitors: 14 from 10 nations
- Winning distance: 65.95 m CR

Medalists
gold medal	Ehsan Haddadi	Iran
silver medal	Behnam Shiri	Iran
bronze medal	Musaeb Al-Momani	Jordan

The men's discus throw at the 2019 Asian Athletics Championships was held on 21 April.

== Records ==
Records before the 2019 Asian Athletics Championships
Record	Athlete (nation)	Distance (m)	Location	Date
World record	Jürgen Schult (GDR)	74.08	Neubrandenburg, East Germany	6 June 1986
Asian record	Ehsan Hadadi (IRI)	69.32	Tallinn, Estonia	3 June 2008
Championship record	Ehsan Hadadi (IRI)	65.38	Amman, Jordan	27 July 2007
World leading	Ola Stunes Isene (NOR)	71.86	Albufeira, Portugal	12 April 2019
Asian leading	Ehsan Hadadi (IRI)	62.48	Chula Vista, United States	11 April 2019

== Results ==
Rank	Name	Nationality	#1	#2	#3	#4	#5	#6	Result	Notes
1st place, gold medalist(s)	Ehsan Haddadi	Iran	61.87	63.05	62.41	63.30	x	65.95	65.95	CR
2nd place, silver medalist(s)	Behnam Shiri	Iran	55.33	60.89	x	57.69	57.15	58.78	60.89	
3rd place, bronze medalist(s)	Musaeb Al-Momani	Jordan	54.69	58.27	55.09	55.16	x	x	58.27	SB
4	Masateru Yugami	Japan	57.29	57.90	x	57.48	56.93	56.69	57.90	
5	Moaaz Mohamed Ibrahim	Qatar	53.54	55.98	55.56	x	57.44	x	57.44	SB
6	Ivan Markelov	Uzbekistan	x	55.80	54.19	54.94	55.16	53.51	55.80	
7	Wei Zidong	China	54.55	53.32	55.27	x	54.15	55.28	55.28	SB
8	Lee Hyun-jae	South Korea	54.01	53.18	55.23	54.80	54.11	55.16	55.23	SB
9	Mohd Irfan Shamshuddin	Malaysia	48.75	54.76	55.18				55.18	SB
10	Tan Shen	China	x	x	54.69				54.69	
11	Shigeyuki Maisawa	Japan	52.09	x	53.67				53.67	
12	Marwan Medany	Bahrain	50.39	50.70	50.91				50.91	SB
13	Ahmad Saed Al-Haj	Qatar	x	x	50.62				50.62	SB
14	Phan Thanh Bình	Vietnam	47.52	43.79	47.75				47.75	
