= Wu Jian =

Chinese discus thrower (born 1986)

Medal record

Men's athletics

Representing China

Asian Athletics Championships
Bronze medal – third place	2011 Kobe	Discus throw

Wu Jian (born 25 May 1986) is a Chinese male track and field athlete who competes in the discus throw. He holds a personal best of 63.54 m (208 ft 5 1/2 in), set in Zhaoqing in 2011. He was a silver medallist at the 2003 World Youth Championships in Athletics and took his first major senior medal (a bronze) at the 2011 Asian Athletics Championships. He represented his country at the 2011 World Championships in Athletics and at the 2014 Asian Games.

At national level, he has had four victories at the Chinese Athletics Championships, winning in 2008, 2010, 2012 and 2014. He placed fourth at the Chinese City Games in 2003 at the age of 17. At the National Games of China, he has represented his native Jiangsu on three occasions: he was discus runner-up to Li Shaojie in 2009 before taking consecutive titles at the 2013 and 2017 Games.

== International competitions ==
Year	Competition	Venue	Position	Notes
2003	World Youth Championships	Sherbrooke, Canada	2nd	63.18 m
2004	World Junior Championships	Grosseto, Italy	22nd (q)	51.83 m
2009	Asian Championships	Guangzhou, China	NM	—
2011	Asian Championships	Kobe, Japan	3rd	56.61 m
2011	World Championships	Daegu, South Korea	17th (q)	62.07 m
2014	Asian Games	Incheon, South Korea	5th	58.82 m
2015	Asian Championships	Wuhan, China	6th	55.75 m
2018	Asian Games	Jakarta, Indonesia	8th	56.86 m

== National titles ==
- Chinese Athletics Championships
  - Discus throw: 2008, 2010, 2012, 2014
- National Games of China
  - Discus throw: 2013, 2017
