= Mahmoud Samimi =

Iranian discus thrower

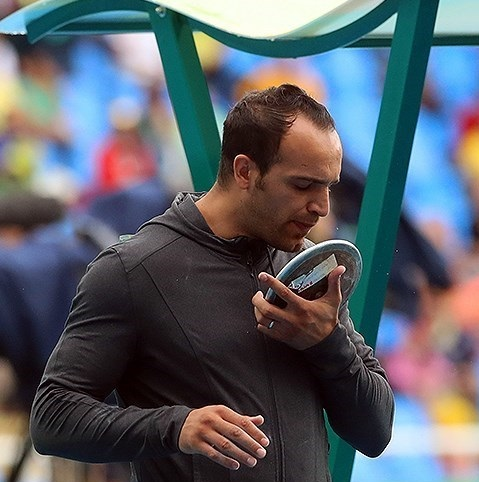

Personal information
- Born: September 18, 1988 (age 37)
Medal record
Representing Iran
Men's athletics
Universiade
Silver medal – second place	2009 Belgrade	Discus throw

Mahmoud Samimi (Persian: محمود صمیمی, born 18 September 1988) is an Iranian discus thrower. He was born in Shahrekord.

He is the younger brother of Abbas and Mohammad Samimi.

== Competition record ==
Year	Competition	Venue	Position	Event	Notes
Representing Iran
2006	World Junior Championships	Beijing, China	2nd	Discus (1.75 kg)	63.00 m
2009	Universiade	Belgrade, Serbia	2nd	Discus	64.67 m
2010	West Asian Championships	Aleppo, Syria	1st	Discus	64.01 m
2011	Asian Championships	Kobe, Japan	4th	Discus	56.22 m
2012	West Asian Championships	Dubai, United Arab Emirates	3rd	Discus	59.00 m
2013	Asian Championships	Pune, India	4th	Discus	60.24 m
2013	Universiade	Kazan, Russia	5th	Discus	59.76 m
2013	World Championships	Moscow, Russia	28th (q)	Discus	57.77 m
2015	Asian Championships	Wuhan, China	3rd	Discus	59.78 m
2015	Universiade	Gwangju, South Korea	–	Discus	NM
2016	Olympic Games	Rio de Janeiro, Brazil	30th (q)	Discus	56.94 m
