= Piotr Małachowski =

Polish discus thrower (born 1983)

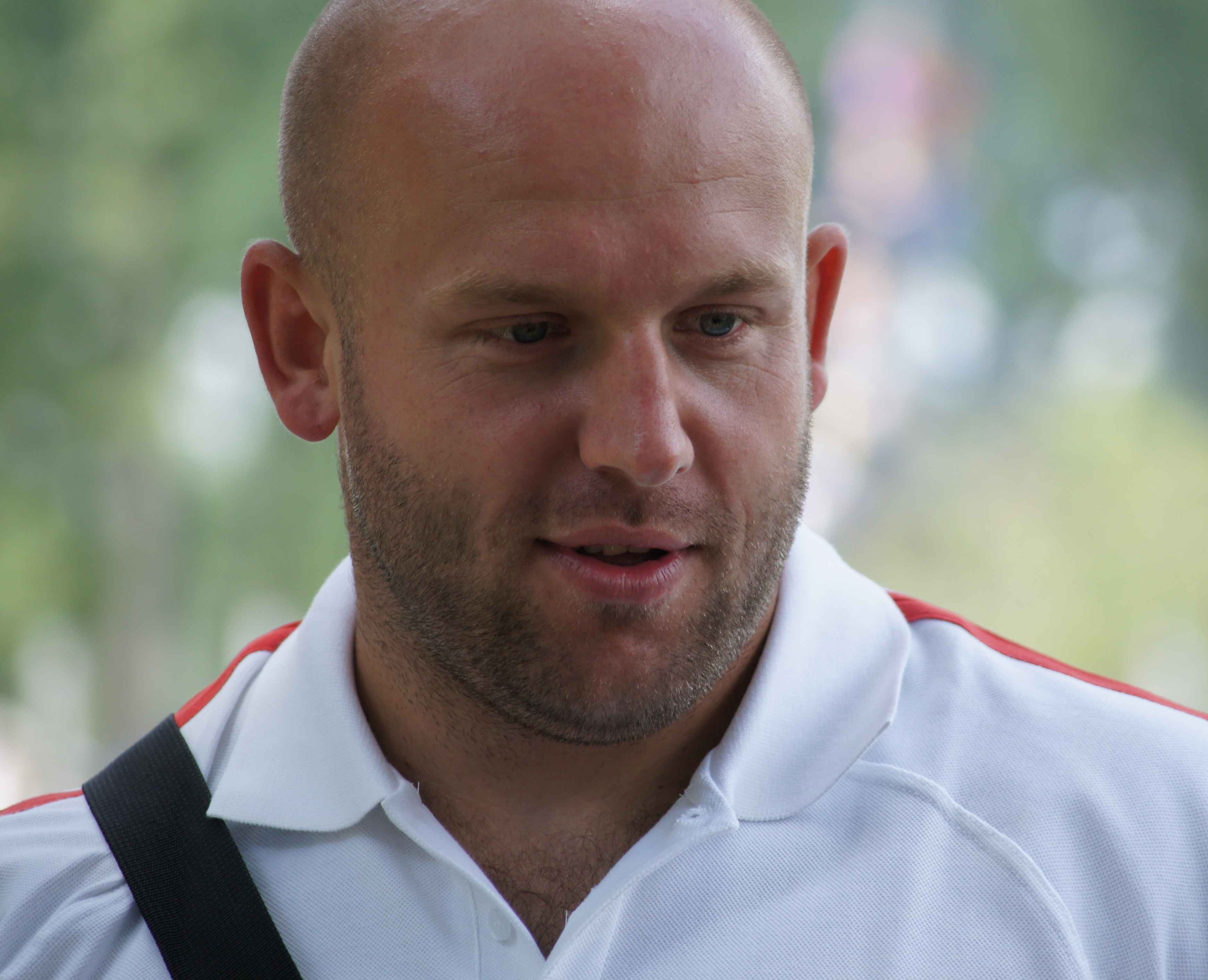
- Małachowski in 2011

Personal information
- Nationality: Polish
- Born: 7 June 1983 (age 43) Żuromin, Poland
- Height: 1.94 m (6 ft 4 in)
- Weight: 130 kg (287 lb) (2012)

Sport
- Sport: Athletics
- Event: Discus throw
- Club: Śląsk Wrocław
- Coached by: Witold Suski (–2019); Gerd Kanter (2019–)
Medal record
Men's athletics
Representing Poland
Event	1st	2nd	3rd
Olympic Games	0	2	0
World Championships	1	2	0
European Championships	2	0	0
Continental Cup	0	0	0
European Team Championships	2	2	1
Total	5	6	1
Olympic Games
Silver medal – second place	2008 Beijing	Discus
Silver medal – second place	2016 Rio de Janeiro	Discus
World Championships
Gold medal – first place	2015 Beijing	Discus
Silver medal – second place	2009 Berlin	Discus
Silver medal – second place	2013 Moscow	Discus
European Championships
Gold medal – first place	2010 Barcelona	Discus
Gold medal – first place	2016 Amsterdam	Discus
European Team Championships
Gold medal – first place	2009 Leiria	Discus
Gold medal – first place	2019 Bydgoszcz	Discus
Silver medal – second place	2010 Bergen	Discus
Silver medal – second place	2014 Braunschweig	Discus
Bronze medal – third place	2011 Stockholm	Discus
European Cup Winter Throwing
Silver medal – second place	2007 Leiria	Discus
European U23 Championships
Silver medal – second place	2005 Erfurt	Discus

Piotr Małachowski (Polish pronunciation: [ˈpjɔtr mawaˈxɔfski]; born 7 June 1983) is a Polish retired discus thrower, two-time silver medalist at the 2008 Summer Olympics and 2016 Summer Olympics. His personal best throw is 71.84 metres, ranks him fifth in all-time longest discus throw distances, achieved on 8 June 2013 at Hengelo, the Netherlands.

== Career ==
Małachowski's throwing distances are seen as even more remarkable as he is not as tall as most discus throwers. Małachowski is one inch shorter than Beijing Olympic champion Gerd Kanter and three inches shorter than world champion Robert Harting and discus great Virgillius Alekna. The typical height of a discus thrower is between 1.95 and 2.00 m (6 ft 5 in and 6 ft 7 in). Despite his height disadvantage, Małachowski makes up for it with his incredible ring speed. Malachowski is seen as one of the quickest discus throwers in the ring of all time, closely followed by Róbert Fazekas.

On 19 August 2008, he won an Olympic silver medal in discus throw (67.82 m) placing behind Gerd Kanter (68.82 m). On 23 May 2009, in Halle he threw 68.75 m with a new PB and NR. On 14 July 2009, he was second in IAAF Golden League Berlin, Germany (67.70 m) to be only beaten by Gerd Kanter (67.88 m).

With an injured finger, Małachowski took a silver medal (69.15 m - NR) at 2009 World Championships in Berlin.

In 2010, he took victory in Golden Gala, IAAF Diamond League (68.78 m), beating second-placed Gerd Kanter (67.69 m), and another win in British Grand Prix (69.83 m - NR).

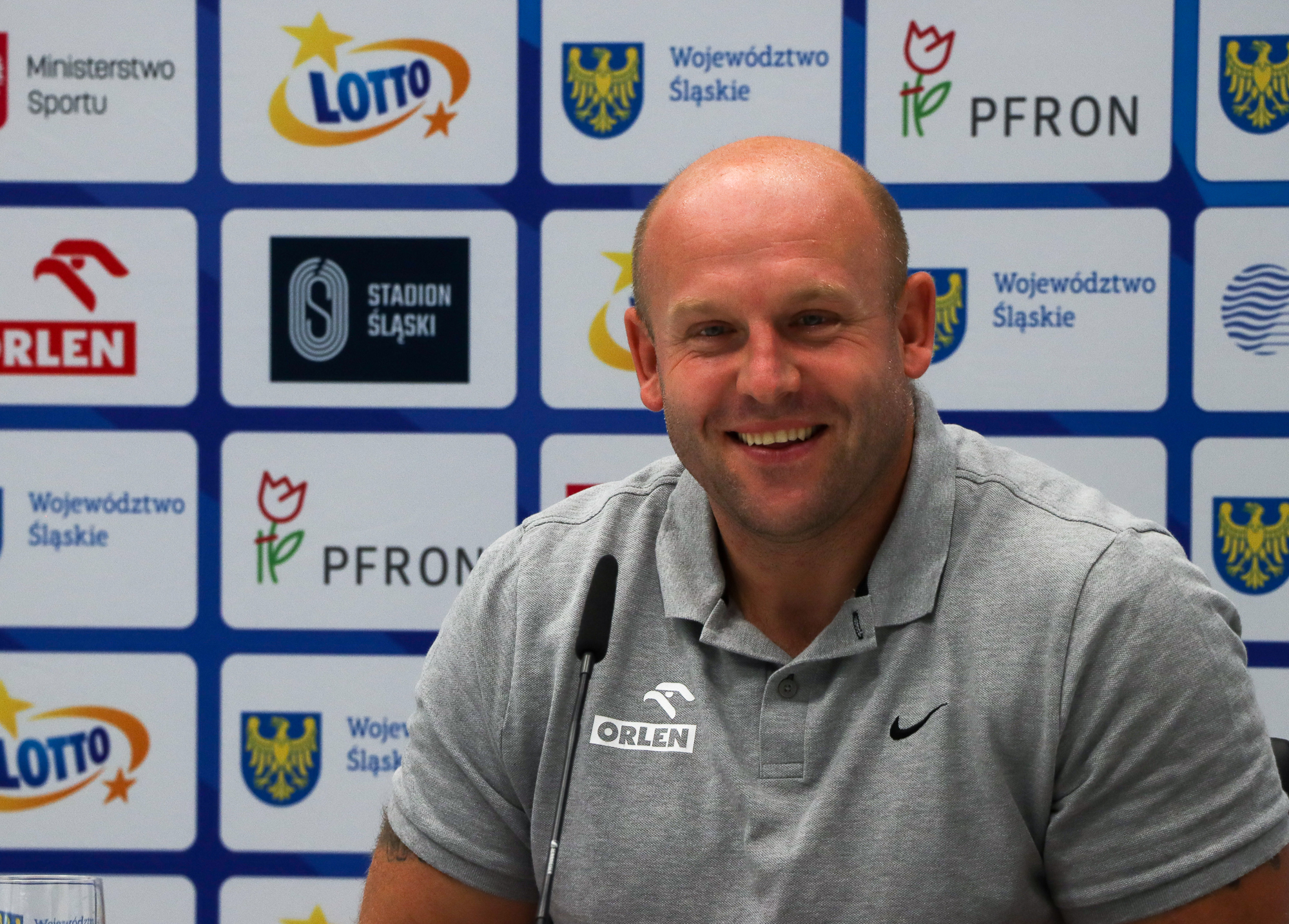
Polish discus thrower Piotr Malachowski in 2020

On 13 August 2016, Małachowski won his second Olympic silver (67.55 m), being surprisingly beaten by German Christoph Harting (68.37 m - PB). He announced shortly afterwards that he would sell his Olympic silver medal to raise funds for a 3-year-old boy with a rare form of cancer. The medal was sold at an auction a few days later.

== Achievements ==
Year	Competition	Venue	Position	Notes
Representing Poland
2001	European Junior Championships	Grosseto, Italy	5th	52.37 m
2002	World Junior Championships	Kingston, Jamaica	6th	60.46 m (1.75 kg)
2003	European U23 Championships	Bydgoszcz, Poland	9th	54.79 m
2005	European U23 Championships	Erfurt, Germany	2nd	63.99 m
2006	European Cup	Málaga, Spain	1st	66.21 m
2006	European Championships	Gothenburg, Sweden	6th	64.57 m
2006	World Athletics Final	Stuttgart, Germany	6th	62.50 m
2007	European Cup	Munich, Germany	1st	66.09 m
2007	World Championships	Osaka, Japan	12th	60.77 m
2007	World Athletics Final	Stuttgart, Germany	3rd	65.35 m
2008	Olympic Games	Beijing, China	2nd	67.82 m
2008	World Athletics Final	Stuttgart, Germany	2nd	66.07 m
2009	European Team Championships	Leiria, Portugal	1st	66.24 m
2009	World Championships	Berlin, Germany	2nd	69.15 m
2009	World Athletics Final	Thessaloniki, Greece	3rd	65.60 m
2010	European Championships	Barcelona, Spain	1st	68.87 m
2011	World Championships	Daegu, South Korea	9th	63.37 m
2012	Olympic Games	London, United Kingdom	5th	67.19 m
2013	World Championships	Moscow, Russia	2nd	68.36 m
2014	European Championships	Zürich, Switzerland	4th	63.54 m
2015	World Championships	Beijing, China	1st	67.40 m
2016	European Championships	Amsterdam, Netherlands	1st	67.06 m
2016	Olympic Games	Rio de Janeiro, Brazil	2nd	67.55 m
2017	World Championships	London, United Kingdom	5th	65.24 m
2018	European Championships	Berlin, Germany	–	NM
2019	World Championships	Doha, Qatar	17th (q)	62.20 m
2021	Olympic Games	Tokyo, Japan	15th (q)	62.68 m

For his sport achievements, he received:
Golden Cross of Merit in 2008.
Golden Medal for Merit for Country Defence in 2009.
Knight's Cross of the Order of Polonia Restituta (5th Class) in 2009.

== See also ==
- Polish records in athletics
