= Maysa Hussain Matrood =

Iraqi long-distance runner

Personal information
- Nationality: Iraqi
- Born: 28 December 1977 (age 48)

Sport
- Sport: Long-distance running
- Event: 5000 metres

Maysa Hussain Matrood (born 28 December 1977) is an Iraqi long-distance runner. She competed in the women's 5000 metres at the 2000 Summer Olympics. She holds the Iraqi national record in the 10,000 metres.
