= Dzmitry Sivakou =

Belarusian discus thrower

Personal information
- Nationality: Belarus
- Born: 15 February 1983 (age 43) Bykhaw, Byelorussian SSR, Soviet Union (now Belarus)
- Height: 1.95 m (6 ft 5 in)
- Weight: 118 kg (260 lb)

Sport
- Sport: Athletics
- Event: Discus throw

Achievements and titles
- Personal best: Discus throw: 64.83 m (2008)
Medal record
Men's athletics
Representing Belarus
World Junior Championships
Silver medal – second place	2002 Kingston	Discus throw

Dzmitry Sivakou (Belarusian: Дзмітрый Сівакоў; born 15 February 1983) is a Belarusian discus thrower. He won a silver medal for the 1.75 kg discus throw at the 2002 IAAF World Junior Championships in Kingston, Jamaica, with his final throw of 62.00 metres.

Sivakou represented Belarus at the 2008 Summer Olympics in Beijing, where he competed for the men's discus throw. He threw the discus into the field at 61.75 metres, finishing fifteenth overall in the qualifying round.
