= Vikas Gowda =

Indian athletics competitor

Vikas Gowda OLY
Personal information
- Full name: Vikas Shive Gowda
- Born: 5 July 1983 (age 43) Mysore, Karnataka, India
- Education: • University of North Carolina at Charlotte (MBA) • University of North Carolina at Chapel Hill (BA, Mathematics)
- Height: 2.05 m (6 ft 9 in)

Sport
- Sport: Track and field
- Event: Discus throw
- College team: North Carolina Tar Heels

Achievements and titles
- Personal bests: 66.28 m NR (2012)
Medal record
Men's athletics
Representing India
Commonwealth Games
Gold medal – first place	2014 Glasgow	Discus
Silver medal – second place	2010 New Delhi	Discus
Asian Games
Silver medal – second place	2014 Incheon	Discus
Bronze medal – third place	2010 Guangzhou	Discus
Asian Championships
Gold medal – first place	2013 Pune	Discus
Gold medal – first place	2015 Wuhan	Discus
Silver medal – second place	2005 Incheon	Discus
Silver medal – second place	2011 Kobe	Discus
Bronze medal – third place	2017 Bhubaneswar	Discus

Vikas Gowda (born 5 July 1983) is a former Indian discus thrower and a four-time Olympian. Born in Mysore and raised in Frederick, he is the son of Shive Gowda, who coached the Indian track team at the 1988 Seoul Olympics. He was the 2006 US NCAA National Champion in discus throw. Gowda won the discus throw event at the 2014 Commonwealth Games, becoming the second Indian man to win a Commonwealth gold in athletics—56 years after Milkha Singh. He is a two-time Asian champion, having won gold medals at the 2013 and 2015 editions of the Asian Championships. Gowda also made history as the first Indian to finish on the podium at a Diamond League meet, a feat matched by only two other Indian athletes as of 2025. In recognition of his achievements, he was honoured with the Arjuna Award in 2014 and the Padma Shri in 2017. Gowda announced his retirement from competitive athletics in 2018 to focus on his corporate career.

== International competitions ==
Year	Competition	Venue	Position	Event	Notes
Representing India
2002	World Junior Championships	Kingston, Jamaica	8th	Shot put (6 kg)	19.30 m
2002	World Junior Championships	Kingston, Jamaica	12th	Discus (1.75 kg)	54.46 m
2004	Olympic Games	Athens, Greece	15th	Discus	61.39 m
2005	Asian Championships	Incheon, South Korea	2nd	Discus	62.84 m
2006	Commonwealth Games	Melbourne, Australia	5th	Shot put	18.46 m
2006	Commonwealth Games	Melbourne, Australia	6th	Discus	60.08 m
2006	Asian Games	Doha, Qatar	6th	Discus	58.28 m
2008	Olympic Games	Beijing, China	22nd	Discus	60.69 m
2010	Asian Games	Guangzhou, China	3rd	Discus	63.13 m
2010	Commonwealth Games	New Delhi, India	2nd	Discus	63.69 m
2011	Asian Championships	Kobe, Japan	2nd	Discus	61.58 m
2011	World Championships	Daegu, South Korea	7th	Discus	64.05 m
2012	Olympic Games	London, United Kingdom	8th	Discus	64.79 m
2013	Asian Championships	Pune, India	1st	Discus	64.90 m
2014	Commonwealth Games	Glasgow, United Kingdom	1st	Discus	63.64 m
2014	Asian Games	Incheon, South Korea	2nd	Discus	62.58 m
2015	Asian Championships	Wuhan, China	1st	Discus	62.03 m
2015	World Championships	Beijing, China	9th	Discus	62.24 m
2016	Olympic Games	Rio de Janeiro, Brazil	28th (q)	Discus	58.99 m
2017	Asian Championships	Bhubaneswar, India	3rd	Discus	60.81 m
