= Sultan Al-Dawoodi =

Saudi Arabian discus thrower (born 1985)

Personal information
- Born: March 16, 1985 (age 41) Bisha, Saudi Arabia
- Height: 1.92 m (6 ft 3 1/2 in)
- Weight: 86 kg (190 lb)

Sport
- Country: Saudi Arabia
- Sport: Athletics
- Event: Discus
- Updated on 12 August 2012

Sultan Mubarak Al-Dawoodi (Arabic: سلطان الداودي; born 16 March 1985) is a Saudi Arabian discus thrower. He was born in Bisha.

His personal best throw is 65.52 metres, achieved in Biała Podlaska in June 2016. He has represented Saudi Arabia at the Summer Olympics three times (2008, 2012, and 2016), failing to reach the final on every occasion.

He was banned from competing for two years for doping.

== Doping ban ==
In April 2009, Al-Dawoodi tested positive for norandrosterone, which is on the list of substances prohibited by the World Anti-Doping Agency, and was subsequently banned from competing in sports for 2 years. The ban ended on 5 June 2011.

== Achievements ==
| Year | Competition | Venue | Position | Event | Notes |
Representing Saudi Arabia
| 2001 | World Youth Championships | Debrecen, Hungary | 5th | Discus throw (1.5 kg) | 57.78 m |
| 2002 | World Junior Championships | Kingston, Jamaica | 29th (q) | Discus throw (1.75 kg) | 50.27 m |
| 2003 | Asian Championships | Manila, Philippines | 6th | Discus throw | 57.36 m |
| 2004 | Asian Junior Championships | Ipoh, Malaysia | 2nd | Discus throw (1.75 kg) | 59.33 m |
| 2004 | World Junior Championships | Grosseto, Italy | 9th | Discus throw (1.75 kg) | 57.67 m |
| 2005 | Islamic Solidarity Games | Mecca, Saudi Arabia | 2nd | Discus throw | 58.66 m |
| 2005 | Asian Championships | Incheon, South Korea | 6th | Discus throw | 56.62 m |
| 2006 | Asian Games | Doha, Qatar | 3rd | Discus throw | 60.82 m |
| 2007 | World Championships | Osaka, Japan | 16th (q) | Discus throw | 61.23 m |
| 2007 | Pan Arab Games | Cairo, Egypt | 1st | Discus throw | 58.63 m |
| 2008 | Olympic Games | Beijing, China | 34th (q) | Discus throw | 56.29 m |
| 2011 | Pan Arab Games | Doha, Qatar | 5th | Discus throw | 57.44 m |
| 2012 | Olympic Games | London, United Kingdom | 33rd (q) | Discus throw | 59.54 m |
| 2013 | Asian Championships | Pune, India | 6th | Discus throw | 60.05 m |
| 2013 | World Championships | Moscow, Russia | 30th (q) | Discus throw | 55.94 m |
| 2013 | Islamic Solidarity Games | Palembang, Indonesia | 5th | Discus throw | 58.76 m |
| 2014 | Asian Games | Incheon, South Korea | 6th | Discus throw | 58.31 m |
| 2016 | Olympic Games | Rio de Janeiro, Brazil | 33rd (q) | Discus throw | 54.84 m |
| 2017 | Islamic Solidarity Games | Baku, Azerbaijan | 3rd | Discus throw | 58.63 m |
| 2017 | Asian Championships | Bhubaneswar, India | 7th | Discus throw | 57.96 m |
| 2018 | Asian Games | Jakarta, Indonesia | 7th | Discus throw | 57.25 m |
