= Alaa Hikmat =

Iraqi sprinter (born 1985)

Alaa Hikmat Jassim Al-Qaysi, born September 14, 1985, is an Iraqi sprinter.

Alaa represented Iraq in the 100 metre sprint at the 2004 Summer Olympics in Athens. She finished last of eight in her heat, with a time of 12.70 seconds. She told reporters:

"I feel I am representing all of the Iraqi people, not just the women. I started training for these Olympics in March, but because of the situation there, I couldn't train as well as I wanted to. If it was possible, I would have trained five to six times a week, but because of the bombs and explosions I often could not."

Alaa lives in Baghdad.

== See also ==
- Dana Hussein Abdul-Razzaq
