= Dana Hussain =

Iraqi sprinter (born 1986)

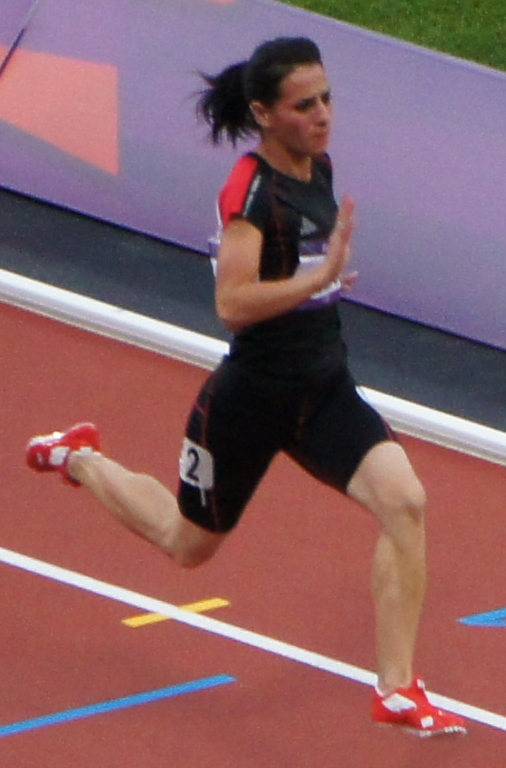
- Dana Hussain in 2012

Personal information
- Full name: Dana Hussain Abdul-Razak Al-Khafaji
- Nationality: Iraqi
- Born: January 3, 1986 (age 40) Baghdad, Iraq
- Height: 1.63 m (5 ft 4 in)
- Weight: 55 kg (121 lb)

Sport
- Country: Iraq
- Sport: Track and field
- Events: 60m sprint 100m sprint 200m sprint
- Coached by: Yousif Abdul-Rahman

Achievements and titles
- Olympicfinals: 2012, 2008
- Highest world ranking: Gold At 2011 Pan Arab Games
Medal record
Pan Arab Games
Gold medal – first place	2011 Doha	100 m
Silver medal – second place	2011 Doha	200 m
Bronze medal – third place	2011 Doha	400 m

Dana Hussain Abdul-Razak Al-Khafaji (born January 3, 1986) also known as Danah Hussein is a sprinter on Iraq's national track and field team, coached by Yousif Abdul-Rahman. Due to the International Olympic Committee ban on Iraq competing at the 2008 Summer Olympics, there were concerns that she might be unable to participate, despite qualifying for the 100- and 200-meter sprint events. The ban was, however, subsequently lifted. She was the only athlete on Iraq's 2008 Olympic team to train within the war-torn country. In Beijing she competed at the 100 metres sprint. In her first round heat she placed sixth in a time of 12.36 which was not enough to advance to the second round.

In 2011 Athletics at the 2011 Pan Arab Games Abdul-razak won Gold for 100 metres event of 11.88 which she won Silver in a 200 metres sprint on 24.61 and in 400 metres sprint she won Bronze of 55.48.

Dana was the Iraqi flag bearer during the London 2012 Summer Olympics opening ceremony.

In 2021, Hussain was suspended for the banned substance cortisone, which she blamed on medications given to her during a rhinoplasty. In 2023, Hussain was given a 2.5 year ban from the sport, starting retroactively from 16 July 2021, due to testing positive for banned substances clenbuterol and stanozolol. The ruling stated that Hussain was given the substances by her coach Karok Salih Mohammed without Hussain's knowledge. Her coach was given a rare lifetime ban from the sport, stating that the antidoping rule violations were "significant and egregious".

Hussain holds the Iranian National Record for the indoor 60m.

== See also ==
- Alaa Jassim
