= 2025 Iranian Athletics Championships =

- Dates: May 5–6, 2025 (men), May 8–9, 2025 (women)
- Host city: Rasht, Gilan, Iran
- Venue: Sardar Jangal Stadium
- Level: Senior
- Type: Outdoor
- Events: (Men: ; Women: 21)
- Participation: Men 223, 203 Women athletes

The 2025 Iran Athletics Championships (Track and Field) were held in two days at Sardar Jangal Stadium in Rasht in 22 events for men and 22 events for women on May 5–6, 2025 (15–16 Ordibehesht 1404) and May 8–9, 2025 (18–19 Ordibehesht 1404). In the men's competition, the Tehran team ranked first with 5 golds, 2 silvers, and 5 bronzes; Khorasan Razavi ranked second with 4 golds and 1 silver; and Isfahan ranked third with 2 golds, 3 silvers, and 2 bronzes. In women's competition, the Tehran team ranked first with 9 golds, 7 silvers, and 3 bronzes; the Khorasan Razavi team ranked second with 3 golds, 3 silvers, and 1 bronze; and the Alborz team ranked third with 2 golds, 2 silvers, and 2 bronzes between all provinces. Overall, 2 national records and 3 junior national records were broken in the women's and men's sections.

== Men results (May 5–6, 2025) ==
Event	Gold		Silver		Bronze	
100 meters (Wind:-0.8 m/s)	Hassan Taftian	10.26 s	Milad Nasehjahani	10.60	Seena Najafi	10.64
200 meters (Wind:+3.5 m/s)	Milad Nasehjahani	21.04	Mohammad Talei	21.06	Seena Najafi	21.08
400 meters	Alireza Jamshahi	47.32	Arash Sayari	47.70	Milad Sarvandi	47.78
800 meters	Hamid Arsalan	1:48.58	Ali Amirian	1:48.97	Omid Amirian	1:49.52
1500 meters	Amir Zamanpour	3:42.26	Amirfarzam Safari	3:47.29	Hossein Nouri	3:48.86
5000 meters	Amirhossein Keivanlou	14:32.62	Milad Rahimi	14:34.98	Mohammadhossein Tayebi	14:39.16
10000 meters	Amirhossein Keivanlou	30:02.60	Mohammadhossein Tayebi	30:24.30	Milad rahimi	30:59.70
20 Km Race Walk	Hamidreza Zoravand	1:23:12 h	Armin Shahmaleki	1:27:17	Mohammadhassan Alast	1:34:18
110 meters hurdles (Wind:-1.7 m/s)	Masoud Kamran	13.84	َMahdi Pirjahan	14.33	Amirhossein Azizi	14.66
400 meters hurdles	Mahdi Pirjahan	50.43	Ali Abaspour	52.10	Yasin Golmohammadi	53.17
3000 meters steeplechase	Hossein Keyhani	8:54.80	Yousef Azarian	8:55.33 Junior NR	Matin Shahbazi	9:10.88
Decathlon	Poya Shokri	6363	Sina Afshin	6096	Amirhossein Ebrahimi	5978
Long jump	Mahdi Tamari	7.46 m (Wind:+2.8 m/s)	Mohammadreza Firouzkouhi	7.31 (Wind:+2.8 m/s)	Mohammadareza Behrouzi	7.24 (Wind:+0.08 m/s)
High jump	Parsa Shadnia	2.08 m	Mohammadmahdi Karimzadeh	2.05	Taha Souri	1.95
Triple jump	Mojtaba Zahedi	15.42 m (Wind:-0.9 m/s)	Mohammad Ghalash	15.08 (Wind:-1.0 m/s)	Ali Seyedi	15.00 (Wind:-2.0 m/s)
Pole vault	Amirmahdi Hanifeh	4.30 m	Mohammad Ghafarian	4.10		
Shot put	Mohammadreza Tayebi	19.24 m	Hassan Ajami	18.91	Morteza Nazemi	18.51
Discus throw	Behnam Shiri	58.51 m	Hossein Rasouli	58.00	Sadegh Samimi	55.33
Javelin throw	Ali Fathiganji	71.22 m	Sadegh Khademi	67.86	Mostafa Nikkhah	63.58
Hammer throw	Mohammad Sistani	67.53 m	Mahdi Haftcheshmeh	64.87	Arsalan Ghashghaei	58.26
4 x 100 m relay	Khorasan Razavi Team	42.31 s	Ilam Team	42.81	Fars Team	42.97
4 x 400 m relay	Tehran Team	3:17.52 s	Kermanshah Team	3:21.43	Kordestan Team	3:21.97

== Women results (May 8–9, 2025) ==
Event	Gold		Silver		Bronze	
100 meters (Wind:+0.0 m/s)	Maryam Toosi	11.48 s	Hamideh Esmaeilnejad	11.73	Melina Esmaeili	12.01
200 meters (Wind:-0.1 m/s)	Maryam Toosi	23.25	Pardis Abdolmohammadi	24.02	Zahra Zarei	24.69
400 meters	Kejan Roostami	56.68	Zahra Zarei	55.49	Negin Azariedalat	56.05
800 meters	Negin Azariedalat	2:08.97	Toktam Dasbandarian	2:09.22	Ayda Narouei	2:09.41
1500 meters	Parichehr Shahi	4:30.56	Maryam Mahmoudi	5:36.99	Samia Shahpari	4:40.16
5000 meters	Hanieh Shahpari	17:24.42 Junior NR	Yeganeh Karim	18:09.53	Fatemeh Chenari	18:38.18
10000 meters	Parisa Arab	34:10.61 NR	Yeganeh Karim	38:18.37	Anoosheh Zolfaghari	39:22.27
20 Km Race Walk	Zeynab Ahadi	1:45:53 h	Saba Farmanpour	1:46:39	Fatemeh Shabanlou	1:51:25
100 meters hurdles (Wind:-0.6 m/s)	Faezeh Ashourpour	14.28	Yasaman Naeimrad	14.65	Azein Ghaderi	15.35
400 meters hurdles	Kajan Rostami	1;01.13	Fatemeh Khorshidvand	1:03.30	Parya Parvizpour	1:05.75
3000 meters steeplechase	Samira Khodatars	10:34.24 NR	Hanieh Shahpari	10:34.61 Junior NR	Atoosa Atashbejan	11:18.61
Long jump	Rayhaneh Mobini	6.47 m (Wind:0.0 m/s)	Maral Atarodi	5.67 (Wind:-1.0 m/s)	zahra Hefzi	5.61 (Wind:-0.4 m/s)
High jump	Mahya Naemi	1.65 m	Asal Aligholi	1.65	Maeedeh Motahari	1.65
Triple jump	Maryam Kazemi	12.82 m (Wind:-1.0 m/s)	Sarina Saedi	12.48 (Wind:-0.4 m/s)	Parisa Nabizadeh	11.72 (Wind:-0.2 m/s)]
Pole vault	Kimia Farahani	3.30 m	Fatemeh Khodaei/Samira Kordali	3.30		
Shot put	Elaheh Alizadeh	14.01 m	Elham Sadathashemi	13.96	Sara Karazmoon	13.20
Discus throw	Mahla Mahrooghee	53.40 m	Jaleh Kardan	52.31	Zahra Najafi	47.33
Javelin throw	Zahra Najafi	46.45 m	Mana Hosseini	45.87	Zahra Sayadi	41.48
Hammer throw	Melika Norouzi	59.68 m	Zahra Arabrostami	57.56	Mahdie Hekmatsara	53.52
Heptathlon	Fatemeh Mohitizadeh	5452	saba Khorasani	5062	Sadaf Aghajani	4867
4 x 100 m relay	Alborz Team	48.49 s	Tehran Team	49.22	Yazd Team	49.52
4 x 400 m relay	Khorasan razavi Team	3:59.24	Fars Team	4:00.99	Alborz Team	4:07.67
