= 2022 Iranian Athletics Championships =

- Dates: May 12-13 2022 (men), June 1-2 2022 (women)
- Host city: Khorramabad, Lorestan Province, Iran (men), Mashhad, Razavi Khorasan Province, Iran (women)
- Venue: Takhti Sport Complex-Khoarramabad, Sabziparvar Sport Complex-Khorramabad, Imam Reza Sport Complex-Mashhad
- Level: Senior
- Type: Outdoor
- Events: 44 (Men: 22; Women: 22)
- Participation: 250 (M) athletes

The 2022 Iranian Athletics Championships were held in May and June 2022. The 22 men's events were held at the Takhti Sport Complex-Khoarramabad and Sabziparvar Sport Complex-Khorramabad from May 12–13. Women events took place at Imam Reza Sport Complex-Mashhad from June 1–2.

The Lorestan-A, Ilam and Isfahan team won the men's competitions. In the women's competitions, the Khorasan Razavi team came in first with five golds, three silvers, and two bronzes. Tehran ranked second with five golds, two silvers, and one bronze; the Kordestan team ranked third with three golds and one silver.

== Men Results ==
Event	Gold		Silver		Bronze	
100 meters (Wind:+0.3 m/s)	Reza Ghasemi	10.63 s	Milad Nasehjahan	10.67	Benyamin Yousefi	10.67
200 meters (Wind:+0.3 m/s)	Mohammadhossein Abaraghi	21.09	Benyamin Yousefi	21.10	Amirreza Moeenpour	21.18
400 meters	Arash Sayari	48.29	Mohammadreza Dehghan	49.00	Daniel Bahadoori	49.05
800 meters	Pejman Yarvali	1:49.35	Ali Alami	1:49.71	Ali Amirian	1:50.05
1500 meters	Khaleel Naseri	3:48.23	Ali Amirian	3:52.25	Ali Alami	3:52.75
5000 meters	Jaleel Nasseri	15:02.20	Pejman Karzeyee	15:11.73	Milad Rahimi	15:21.01
10000 meters	Morteza Biranvand	31:18.78	Shaheen Yazdan	32:08.88	Milad Rahimi	33:18.94
20 km walk	Hamireza Zooravand	1:34:55	Armin Shahmaleki	1:36.57	Amirhossein Asadimanesh	1:40.49
110 meters hurdles (Wind:+1.4 m/s)	Masoud Kamran	14.05	Ali Salamatian	14.39	Amirhossein Azizi	14.69
400 meters hurdles	Mehdi Pirjahan	50.20	Ali Abbaspour	51.58	Amir Moghadami	52.48
3000 meters steeplechase	Khalil Naseri	9.07.70	Sameer Eghbali	9:18.77	Amirhossein Safari	9:42.88
Long jump	Morteza Abbaspour	7.57 m (Wind:+0.5 m/s)	Mohammadreza Firouzkohi	7.44 (Wind:+1.9 m/s)	Alireza Khaledi	7.40 (Wind:-0.6 m/s)
High jump	Keyvan Ghanbarzadeh	2.15 m	Hossein Beezar	2.05	Mehdi Khodadadi	2.05
Triple jump	Hamidreza Kia	16.24 m (Wind:+0.3 m/s)	Mojtaba Zahedi	16.01 (Wind:+1.0 m/s)	Mobeen Madahi	15.58 (Wind:+0.4 m/s)
Pole vault	Amirarshia Mosadeghi 4.90 m	Mohammadmehdi Motamednia	4.60	Mohammadmehdi Zahedi	4.40	
Shot put	Mehdi Saberi	19.22 m	Mehran Khoorand	18.54	Morteza Nazemi	18.46
Discus throw	Ehsan Haddadi	59.81 m	Hossein Rasouli	57.86 m	Mohammadreza Rahmani	57.81
Javelin throw	Younes Yousefvand	72.93 m	Ali Fathiganjee	71.74	Sadegh Khademi	71.07
Hammer throw	Reza Moghadaam	72.92 m	Ali Moradi	64.09	Sahand Noori	63.38
Decathlon	Mehdi Shahpasand	5766	Daniel Entezari	5529	Amirmehdi hanafiyeh	5505
4 x 100 m relay	Khorrasan Razavi Team	41.89 S	Ghom Team	42.59	Isfahan Team	42.89
4 x 400 m relay	Lorestan-A Team	3:16.95	Kermanshah Team	3:17.54	Ghom Team	3:18.87

== Women Results ==
Event	Gold		Silver		Bronze	
100 meters (Wind: m/s)	Farzaneh Fasihi	11.10 s	Hamideh Esmaeilnejad	11.50	Sanaz Amiripour	11.60
200 meters (Wind:+0.9 m/s)	Kejan Rostami	24.62	Sanaz Amiripour	24.75	Melina Esmaeili	25.31
400 meters	Kejan Rostami	56.06	Sameen Jafarzadeh	56.90	Maryam Mohebi	56.94
800 meters	Sajedeh Fani	2:11.92	Sepideh Saremi	2:13.27	Fatemeh Hosseinkhani	2:24.87
1500 meters	Parichehr Shahee	4:33.55	Samira Khodatars	4:41.18	Hadiseh Raouf	5:41.27
5000 meters	Zahra Afsharian	18:55.92	Bahareh Jahanteegh	19:16.60	Anoosheh Zolfaghari	19:21.25
10000 meters	Zahra Afsharian	41:44.14	Zohreh Abdolhosseini	42:05.41	Anoosheh Zolfaghari	42:55.97
10 km walk	Zaynab Ahadi	54:25.1	Fatemeh Shaabanloo	55:16.6	Zahra Ghalenoui	56:34.7
100 meters hurdles (Wind:+0.1 m/s)	Faezeh Ashoorpour	14.44	Pardis Abdolmohammadi	14.67	Faezeh Tabatabai	14.96
400 meters hurdles	Shahla Mahmoodi	1:01.36	Nazaneen Fatemeheydian	1:02.04	Pardis Abdolmohammadi	1:02.81
3000 meters steeplechase	Samira Khodatars	10:52.73 NR	Hadiseh Raouf	11:03.22 NR Junior	Fatemeh Simashadkam	11:36.19
Long jump	Rayhaneh Mobini	6.36 m (Wind:-0.7 m/s)	Mohadeseh Ebrahimipour	5.89 (Wind:-0.6 m/s)	Elaheh Rahimifard	5.73 (Wind:-0.1 m/s)
High jump	Mahdyeh Zaeemee	1.68 m	Mina Hosseini	1.65	Maheeya Naemi	1.65
Triple jump	Sarina Saedi	12.27 m (Wind:+0.1 m/s)	Hadiseh Ahmadi	12.01 (Wind:+0.3 m/s)	Zahra Payard	11.78 (Wind: 0.0 m/s)
Pole vault	Mahsa Mirzatayebi	4.00 m	Samira Kordali	3.40	Fatemeh Khodaee	3.20
Shot put	Elham Sadathashemiabbasi	13.28 m	Zahra Omidvar	13.01	Melina Rezaimalek	12.62
Discus throw	Jaleh Kardan	49.40 m	Zahra Omidvar	42.24	Mahsheed Adel	42.20
Javelin throw	Sahar Ziyaee	43.27 m	Mana Hosseini	39.44 m	Zahra Sayadi	37.99
Hammer throw	Zahra Arabroostami	54.35 m	Mahdyeh Hekmatsara	53.51	Rayhaneh Arrayee	52.79
Heptathlon	Sadaf Aghajani	4401	Maral Attari	3948	Kimia Pourkhalkhali	3875
4 x 100 m relay	Isfahan Team	47.89	Alborz Team	48.06	Khorrasan Razavi Team	48.88
4 x 400 m relay	Markazi Team	3:55.732	Kordestan Team	4:03.81	Isfahan Team	4:6.45
