= 2025 Asian Athletics Championships – Men's discus throw =

Men's discus throw at the 2025 Asian Athletics Championships
- Venue: Gumi Civic Stadium
- Location: Gumi, South Korea
- Dates: 30 May
- Competitors: 15 from 11 nations
- Winning distance: 63.47 m

Medalists
gold medal	Abuduaini Tuergong	China
silver medal	Masateru Yugami	Japan
bronze medal	Irfan Shamsuddin	Malaysia

The men's discus throw event at the 2025 Asian Athletics Championships was held on 30 May.

== Records ==
Records before the 2025 Asian Athletics Championships
Record	Athlete (nation)	Distance (m)	Location	Date
World record	Mykolas Alekna (LTU)	75.56	Ramona, United States	13 April 2025
Asian record	Ehsan Hadadi (IRI)	69.32	Tallinn, Estonia	3 June 2008
Championship record	Ehsan Hadadi (IRI)	65.95	Doha, Qatar	21 April 2019
World leading	Mykolas Alekna (LTU)	75.56	Ramona, United States	13 April 2025
Asian leading	Abuduaini Tuergong (CHN)	65.35	Chengdu, China	2 April 2025

== Schedule ==
The event schedule, in local time (UTC+9), was as follows:

Date	Time	Round
30 May	18:30	Final

== Results ==
Place	Athlete	Nation	#1	#2	#3	#4	#5	#6	Result	Notes
1st place, gold medalist(s)	Abuduaini Tuergong	China	61.50	62.04	60.34	63.47	x	63.42	63.47 m	SB
2nd place, silver medalist(s)	Masateru Yugami	Japan	59.08	60.38	55.63	55.57	57.38	57.08	60.38 m	
3rd place, bronze medalist(s)	Irfan Shamsuddin	Malaysia	58.55	x	x	57.60	56.56	58.82	58.82 m	
4	Hossein Rasouli	Iran	57.92	57.41	57.89	56.98	57.74	57.53	57.92 m	SB
5	Moaaz Mohamed Ibrahim	Qatar	54.36	57.70	x	57.25	x	56.09	57.70 m	
6	Essa Al-Zenkawi	Kuwait	56.12	57.01	x	55.83	50.91	57.26	57.26 m	
7	Yūji Tsutsumi	Japan	56.84	x	x	56.22	56.72	55.44	56.84 m	
8	Behnam Shiri	Iran	54.78	56.20	56.77	53.60	53.23	53.45	56.77 m	
9	Kim Il-hyun	South Korea	x	51.44	56.01				56.01 m	SB
10	Li Tzu-yun	Chinese Taipei	53.56	54.77	53.21				54.77 m	
11	Abdullah Mohammad Al-Zankawi	Kuwait	x	49.12	54.44				54.44 m	
12	Kim Dong-hyuk	South Korea	52.55	53.50	53.83				53.83 m	SB
13	Mustafa Kadhim	Iraq	x	x	51.34				51.34 m	
—	Yan Htet Wai	Myanmar	x	x	x				NM	
—	Rashid Sodikov	Uzbekistan	x	x	-				NM	
