= 2023 Asian Athletics Championships – Men's discus throw =

Men's discus throw at the 2023 Asian Athletics Championships
- Venue: National Stadium
- Location: Bangkok, Thailand
- Dates: 15 July
- Competitors: 13 from 10 nations
- Winning distance: 61.19 m

Medalists
gold medal	Tuergong Abuduaini	China
silver medal	Essa Al-Zenkawi	Kuwait
bronze medal	Mohd Irfan Shamshuddin	Malaysia

The men's discus throw event at the 2023 Asian Athletics Championships was held on 15 July.

== Records ==
Records before the 2023 Asian Athletics Championships
Record	Athlete (nation)	Distance (m)	Location	Date
World record	Jürgen Schult (GDR)	74.08	Neubrandenburg, East Germany	6 June 1986
Asian record	Ehsan Hadadi (IRI)	69.32	Tallinn, Estonia	3 June 2008
Championship record	Ehsan Hadadi (IRI)	65.95	Doha, Qatar	21 April 2019
World leading	Kristjan Čeh (SLO)	71.86	Jõhvi, Estonia	16 June 2023
Asian leading	Moaaz Mohamed Ibrahim (QAT)	62.48	Algiers, Algeria	5 July 2023

== Results ==
Rank	Name	Nationality	#1	#2	#3	#4	#5	#6	Result	Notes
1st place, gold medalist(s)	Tuergong Abuduaini	China	59.68	x	x	x	58.64	61.19	61.19	
2nd place, silver medalist(s)	Essa Al-Zenkawi	Kuwait	57.37	59.49	57.69	59.95	60.23	59.01	60.23	
3rd place, bronze medalist(s)	Mohd Irfan Shamshuddin	Malaysia	58.17	59.63	58.51	58.44	x	57.48	59.63	
4	Mouad Mohamed Ibrahim	Qatar	57.47	56.46	59.28	57.02	59.17	x	59.28	
5	Yuji Tsutsumi	Japan	55.18	58.90	x	53.56	x	52.94	58.90	
6	Hossein Rasouli	Iran	57.27	56.88	56.20	x	57.97	57.12	57.97	
7	Masateru Yugami	Japan	55.56	57.85	x	57.56	x	x	57.85	
8	Yevgeniy Milovatskiy	Kazakhstan	54.74	54.02	x	x	52.40	52.58	54.74	
9	Dunyozod Sayfullayev	Uzbekistan	51.80	53.61	52.44				53.61	
10	Bandit Singhatongkul	Thailand	49.04	49.30	50.00				50.00	
11	Thongchai Silamool	Thailand	44.10	48.96	49.14				49.14	
12	Keatpradit Srisai	Thailand	x	x	48.29				48.29	
	Kim Il-hyeon	South Korea	x	x	x				NM	
