= 2023 Iranian Athletics Championships =

- Dates: Aug 30-31 2023 (women), Sept 3-4 2023 (men)
- Host city: Tehran, Tehran, Iran
- Venue: Aftab Enghelab Sport Complex
- Level: Senior
- Type: Outdoor
- Events: (Men: ; Women: 21)
- Participation: +200 Women athletes

The 2023 Iran Athletics Championships (Track and Field) were held in two days at Aftab Enghelab Sport Complex in Tehran in 21 events for women on 30–31 August 2023 (8-9 Shahrivar 1402) and for men in 21 events on Sept 3-4 2023. In women's competition Khorasan Razavi team ranked first by 6 golds, 1 silver and 5 bronzes, Tehran ranked second by 4 golds, 2 silvers and 3 bronzes and Alborz team ranked third by 4 golds, 1 silver and 2 bronzes between all provinces. In Men's competition Khorasan Razavi team ranked first with 5 golds and 1 bronze, Tehran ranked second with 4 golds and 2 bronzes and East Azerbaijan ranked third with 2 golds. 1 national record in women section was broken.

== Women results ==
Event	Gold		Silver		Bronze	
100 meters (Wind:-1.4 m/s)	Hamideh Esmaeilnejad	11.56 s	Sanaz Amiripour	12.25	Delnia Beigomjani	12.36
200 meters (Wind:-2.3 m/s)	Melina Esmaeili	25.28	Setayesh Izaditabar	25.63	Faezeh Tabatabai/Delnia Beigomjani	25.94
400 meters	Kejan Rostami	57.16	Zahra Zarei	57.64	Hajar Safarzadeh	57.80
800 meters	Parisa Amini	2:17.74	Sepideh Saremi	2:18.87	Negeen Valipour	2:21.54
1500 meters	Taktom Dastarbandan	4:47.01	Atosa Atashbejan	4:49.65	Mobina Khayat	5:03.89
5000 meters	Zahra Afsharian	18:46.49	Elaheh Sinkaee	19.11.45	Anoosheh Zolfaghari	19.15.48
10000 meters	Zahra Afsharian	39:30.31	Elaheh Sinkaee	39.58.28	Zahra Rezai	40:20.29
100 meters hurdles (Wind:-1.0 m/s)	Elnaz Kompani	14.14	Faezeh Tabatabai	14.21	Pardis Abdolmohammadi	14.22
400 meters hurdles	Shahla Mahmoodi	59.16 NR	kajan Rostami	1:01.56	Sameen Jafarzadeh	1:03.82
3000 meters steeplechase	Setayesh Amini	11:44.27	Atosa Atashbejan	11:44.27	Mobina Khayat	12:27.43
Long jump	Elaheh Rahimifar	6.21 m (Wind:-2.7 m/s)	Najmeh Kharmali	5.57 (Wind:-3.2 m/s)	Kimia Pourkhalkhali	5.47 (Wind:-2.7 m/s)
High jump	Mahdyeh Zaeemee	1.74 m	Asal Aligholi	1.65	Maeedeh Taheri	1.65
Triple jump	Maryam Kazemi	12.34 m (Wind:+0.6 m/s)	Mitra Pirasteh	11.11 (Wind:+0.4 m/s)		
Pole vault	Mahsa Mirzatabibi	3.80 m	Samira Kordali	3.40	Kimia Farahani	3.20
Shot put	Elham Hashemi	13.64 m	Zahra Omidvar	13.33	Elaheh Alizadeh	12.98
Discus throw	Mahla Mahrooghee	49.19 m	Zahra Najafi	45.56	Elham Samarghandian	42.68
Javelin throw	Mana Hosseini	48.12 m	Zahra Najafi	47.19	Zahra Mansouri	28.32
Hammer throw	Meleeka Norouzi	54.90 m	Mahdyeh Hekmatsara	50.98	Mahdis Minai	41.47
Heptathlon	Fatemeh Moheetizadeh	5140	Sadaf Aghajani	3982	Nazaneen Maleki	3111
4 x 100 m relay	Alborz Team	48.22	Kordestan Team	49.07	Tehran Team	49.33
4 x 400 m relay	Kordestan Team	4:06.28	Isfahan Team	4:10.10	Khorsan Razavi Team	4:12.76

== Men results ==
Event	Gold		Silver		Bronze	
100 meters (Wind:+0.5 m/s)	Hassan Taftian	10.16 s	Benyamin Yousefi	10.38	Mohammadamin Ghareh	10.75
200 meters (Wind:-1.3 m/s)	Benyamin Yousefi	21.28	Mohammad Jafari	21.70	Masseh Moradi	22.20
400 meters	Milad Sarvandi	47.98	Arash Sayari	48.42	Sepehr Kefayati	48.75
800 meters	Ali Amirian	1:52.05	Sobhan Ahmadi	1:52.08	Amirfarzam Safari	1:53.01
1500 meters	Amirfarzam Safari	4:07.58	Ali Amirian	4:07.64	Abolrahim Darzadeh	4:09.53
5000 meters	Amirreza Samoudi	15:17.52	Aliakbar Bazri	15:26.94	Amirmohammad Rustami	15:40.96
10000 meters	Aliakbar Bazri	31:50.06	Sajad Asghari	33:10.48	Seena Shokooh	33:24.09
110 meters hurdles (Wind:-1.6 m/s)	Ali Salamatian	14.53	َAmirhossein Azizi	14.87	Mohammadhossein Rafiee	15.18
400 meters hurdles	Ali Abbaspour	50.67	Mohammad Abdshahri	53.28	Milad Mesbah	54.12
3000 meters steeplechase	Amirreza Samoudi	9.13.06	Mohammad Bagheri	9:38.76	Behrouz Mostafavi	9:48.46
Decathlon	Amirmehdi Hanifeh	6161	Mohammadreza Aslani	5928	Mohammadamin Abdolahi	5829
Long jump	Hossein Mehmandost	7.40 m (Wind:+2.3 m/s)	Alireza Khaledi	7.32 (Wind:+2.5 m/s)	Mohammadamin Ghareh	7.27 (Wind:+1.0 m/s)
High jump	Keyvan Ghanbarzadeh	2.14 m	Mahdi Karimzadeh / Reza Salimi	2.00		
Triple jump	Mojtaba Zahedi	15.18 m (Wind:-0.3 m/s)	Ali Seyedi	14.81 (Wind:+0.4 m/s)	Javad Abidi	14.14 (Wind:+0.7 m/s)
Pole vault	Arshia Mosadeghi	4.70 m	Mohammadmehdi Motamednia	4.40	Mohammad Ghafarian	4.20
Shot put	Mehdi Saberi	19.95 m	Morteza Nazemi	18.86	Hassan Ajami	18.26
Discus throw	Ehsan Haddadi	60.03 m	Hossein Rasouli	59.31	Hossein Rouzegar	52.14
Javelin throw	Younes Yousefvand	71.42 m	Mostafa Neekkhah	69.55	Mehdi Fathiganji	66.80
Hammer throw	Sahand Noori	63.21 m	Mohammad Seestani	60.73	Payam Sadri	55.19
4 x 100 m relay	Tehran Team	41.61 s	Fars Team	41.62	Albourz Team	42.76
4 x 400 m relay	Khorasan Razavi Team	3:16.77 s	Lorestan Team	3:17.13	Sistan Balouchestan Team	3:21.27
