= Iran national track and field team sex scandal =

On 31 May 2025, South Korean police arrested two Iranian male athletes, Hossein Rasouli and Masoud Kamran, along with national team coach Amir Moradi, on charges of sexually assaulting a 20-year-old South Korean woman.

== Description ==
The 2025 Asian Athletics Championships were held in Gumi, South Korea from May 29 to June 3. Iran was also sent to the competition with a mix of athletes, coaches, and federation officials. The Iranian national team had previously won medals in several Asian competitions and was expected to perform positively.

This refers to a controversial incident that occurred on May 31, during the 2025 Asian Athletics Championships in Gumi, South Korea. In this incident, two athletes and a coach from the Iranian national team were arrested on charges of gang rape of a young Korean woman. The incident received widespread coverage in domestic and international media, and was accompanied by critical reactions towards the management of the Iranian sports convoy.

On the evening of May 30, 2025, three members of the Iranian team, Hossein Rasouli, Masoud Kamran, and coach Amir Moradi, met a 20-year-old woman at a bar and invited her to their hotel. According to South Korean police, the woman claimed to have been gang-raped.

She used her mobile phone to send police her location from inside the bathroom. South Korean police immediately responded and arrested the suspects at the scene. The individuals were questioned and an official investigation was launched.

== Reactions ==
=== In South Korea ===
The Gumi police announced that an investigation was underway with the presence of an official translator. Korean media published the news under the title "Iranian athletes gang rape Korean woman" and called for serious legal action.

=== In Iran ===
As the news spread in the international media, the Ministry of Sport and Youth sent a delegation to South Korea to investigate the matter. People gathered to demand the dismissal of Ehsan Haddadi, the head of the Athletics Federation.

== Legal action ==
South Korea's penal code provides for penalties of up to seven years in prison for gang rape. The Iranian suspects are currently in temporary detention and the legal process is ongoing. The Iranian embassy in Seoul has also entered the matter.
