= 2021 Iranian Athletics Championships =

- Dates: May 22–23, 25-26 2021
- Host city: Arak, Markazi, Iran
- Venue: Imam Khomeni Stadium
- Level: Senior
- Type: Outdoor
- Events: 44 (Men: 22; Women: 22)
- Participation: 200 athletes

The 2021 Iranian Athletics Championships (Track and Field) were held in two days at Imam Khomeini stadium in Arak in 44 events for men and women. The competition had 100 world ranking points for the winner of each competition. In men competition East Azarbaijan team took the overall results with 4 golds and 2 silvers. In women competition Tehran team took overall result with 5 golds, 4 silvers and 1 bronze.

== Men Results ==
Event	Gold		Silver		Bronze	
100 meters (Wind: -1.1 m/s)	Maysam Rashidi	10.56	Mehran Hosseini	10.59	Ali Ghasembabai	10.60
200 meters (Wind: -3.3 m/s)	Sajjad Hashemi	21.12	Milad Nasehjahani	21.26	Ali Lotfee	21.66
400 meters	Sajjad Hashemi	45.65	Milad Nasehjahani	46.87	Milad Sarvandi	48.19
800 meters	Pejman Yarvali	1:51.88	Omid Amirian	1:53.61	Sobhan Ahmadi	1:54.09
1500 meters	Ami Amirian	3:54.66	Amir Zamanpour	3:54.81	Ali Alami	3:59.51
110 meters hurdles (Wind: 0 m/s)	Masoud Kamyar	14.25	Milad Sayar	14.31	Ali Salamatian	14.38
400 meters hurdles	Mehdi Pirjahan	50.15	Reza Malekpour	51.06	Amir Moghadami	53.28
3000 meters steeplechase	Amir Zamanpour	9:33.89	Amir Azarian	9:36.98	Khalil Naseri	9.38.95
Shot put	Shahin Merdelan	19.97 m	Mohammadreza Tayebi	19.95	Morteza Nazemi	19.18
Discus throw	Hossein Rasouli	57.17 m	Sadegh Samimi	56.31	Sajad Piraigherchaman	51.64
Hammer throw	Reza Moghadaam	71.78 m	Mahdi Mohammadi	63.60	Ali Moradee	59.26
4 x 100 m relay	Isfahan Team	40.96	Ghom Team	41.83	Kordestan Team	43.07
Javelin throw	Ali Fathiganjee	72.56 m	Younes Yousefvand	68.97	Ali Ramezani	68.32
Pole vault	Hossein Fallah	4.90 m	Amirarshia Mosadeghi	4.80	-	-.--
High jump	Keyvan Ghanbarzadeh	2.15 m	Reza Salimi	2.05	Ali Sohrabi	1.95
Long jump	Hassan Mihandoost	7.84 m (Wind: -1.33 m/s)	Younes Yousefvand	7.28 (Wind: -0.9 m/s)	mahdi tamari	7.21 (Wind: +0.8 m/s)
Triple jump	Hamidreza Kia	16.44 m (Wind: -1.2 m/s)	Ali Aghili	15.96 (Wind: -1.3 m/s)	Vaheed Sadeegh	15.61 (Wind: -0.8 m/s)
5000 meters	Jalil Nasseri	15:36.55	Khalil Nasseri	15:38.53	Amirhossein Safari	15:40.11
10000 meters	Jalil Nasseri	32:48.45	Hassan Salehiamn	32:50.39	Mansour Bayat	33:02.13
20 km walk	Hamireza Zooravand	1:34:08	Armin Shahmaleki	1:37:09	Amirhossein Asadimanesh	1:37:50
4 x 400 m relay	Azarbaijan Sharghee Team	3:18.44	Ghom Team	3:19.87	Lorestan Team	3:22.78
Decathlon	Abbas Nikbaf	6257	Erfan Mahmoodi	6068	Mohammad Mosavinejad	5981

== Women Results ==
Event	Gold		Silver		Bronze	
100 meters (Wind: -2.0 m/s)	Farzaneh Fasihi	11.74	Hamideh Esmaeilnejad	11.96	Faezeh Nssaei	12.14
200 meters (Wind: -0.9 m/s)	Hamideh Esmaelnejad	24.74	Kejan Rostami	25.19	Maryam Mohebi	25.26
400 meters	Maryam Mohebi	56.25	Kejan Rostami	56.57	Mohadaseh Ebrahimpour	56.80
800 meters	Maryam Mahmoodi	2:12.83	Sepideh Saremi	2:15.17	Hanyeh Samari	2:15.20
1500 meters	Fatemeh Nasiri	4:49.49	Elnaz Kompani	5:04.36	Pardis Abdolmohammadi	5:15.99
100 meters hurdles (Wind:0.0 m/s)	Faezeh Ashourpour	14.08	Milad Sayar	14.46	Ali Salamatian	14.98
400 meters hurdles	Shahla Mahmoodi	1:01.36	Narges Rastegar	1:05.61	Atefeh Sadr	1:08.59
3000 meters steeplechase	Fatemeh Nasiri	11:29.25	Haseeseh Raoof	11:50.39	Samira Khodatars	12:17.04
Shot put	Elhamosadat Hashemi	13.43 m	Maryam Norouzi	12.54	Zahra Omidvar	12.44
Discus throw	Mahla Mahrooghee	48.42 m	Zahra Omidvar	44.07	Fatemeh Shokree	39.40
Hammer throw	Rayhaneh Arayee	51.70 m	Mahdyeh Hekmatsara	51.45	Meleeka Norouzi	49.64
4 x 100 m relay	Khorasan Razavi Team	48.23	Isfahan Team	48.50	Yazd Team	49.87
Javelin throw	Nastaran Amirimehr	38.78 m	Hanyeh Asadyan	35.34	Zahra Sayadee	34.99
Pole vault	Mahsa Mirzatabibi	3.80 m	Fatemeh Khodaee	3.10	Niloofar Fashkhooraee	2.90
High jump	Mahdyeh Zaeemee	1.69 m	Mina Hosseini	1.65	Mahsa Kargar	1.64
Long jump	Rayhaneh Mobeenee	6.07 m (Wind: -3.1 m/s)	Elaheh Rahimifard	5.81 (Wind: -1.6 m/s)	Maryamosadat Asgharee	5.73 (Wind: -2.8 m/s)
Triple jump	Hadeeseh Ahmadi	12.47 m (Wind: -1.8 m/s)	Sarina Saeedee	12.34 (Wind: -4.5 m/s)	Maryam Kazemi	12.01 (Wind: -0.7 m/s)
5000 meters	Bahareh Jahanteegh	19:36.08	Parichehr Shahi	19.44.95	Fatemeh Miran	19.48.17
10000 meters	Parichehr Shahi	41:36.13	Fatemeh Miran	41:49.34	Fatemeh Chenari	43:05.20
10 km walk	Zaynab Ahadi	57:39	Fatemeh Shaabanloo	58:12	Malyheh Bakhtee	1:02:10
4 x 400 m relay	Markazi Team	4:04.40	Azarbaijan Sharghee Team	4:09.99	Khorsan Razavi Team	4:16.48
Heptathlon	Maral Otaredinya	3937	Marya Khoshnyat	2889	Fatemeh Moheetizadeh	2614
