= Athletics at the 2018 Asian Games – Men's discus throw =

Asian Games athletics competition

Men's discus throw at the 2018 Asian Games
- Venue: Gelora Bung Karno Stadium
- Dates: 29 August 2018
- Competitors: 11 from 10 nations

Medalists
gold medal	Ehsan Haddadi	Iran
silver medal	Mustafa Kadhim	Iraq
bronze medal	Essa Al-Zenkawi	Kuwait

The men's discus throw event at the 2018 Asian Games was held on 29 August at the Gelora Bung Karno Stadium.

== Schedule ==
All times are Western Indonesia Time (UTC+07:00)

Date	Time	Event
Wednesday, 29 August 2018	20:00	Final

== Records ==
Prior to this competition, the existing world, Asian and Games records were as follows.

World Record	Jürgen Schult (GDR)	74.08	Neubrandenburg, East Germany	6 June 1986
Asian Record	Ehsan Haddadi (IRI)	69.32	Tallinn, Estonia	3 June 2008
Games Record	Ehsan Haddadi (IRI)	67.99	Guangzhou, China	24 November 2010

== Results ==
Rank	Athlete	Attempt						Result	Notes
Rank	Athlete	1	2	3	4	5	6	Result	Notes
1st place, gold medalist(s)	Ehsan Haddadi (IRI)	63.67	64.72	62.84	62.36	65.25	65.71	65.71	
2nd place, silver medalist(s)	Mustafa Kadhim (IRQ)	57.19	59.53	53.67	60.09	59.89	X	60.09	
3rd place, bronze medalist(s)	Essa Al-Zenkawi (KUW)	56.86	58.94	X	56.32	59.44	X	59.44	
4	Behnam Shiri (IRI)	54.47	54.55	X	56.99	56.86	58.09	58.09	
5	Irfan Shamsuddin (MAS)	57.70	X	X	54.13	55.62	X	57.70	
6	Masateru Yugami (JPN)	55.49	53.35	57.20	56.13	56.31	57.62	57.62	
7	Sultan Al-Dawoodi (KSA)	53.94	57.25	56.10	X	56.24	52.07	57.25	
8	Wu Jian (CHN)	55.84	X	56.66	56.86	55.84	55.97	56.86	
9	Moaaz Mohamed Ibrahim (QAT)	19.60	X	53.08				53.08	
10	Narong Benjaroon (THA)	48.27	47.92	47.74				48.27	
11	Rafika Putra (INA)	X	42.12	X				42.12	
