= 2017 Asian Athletics Championships – Men's discus throw =

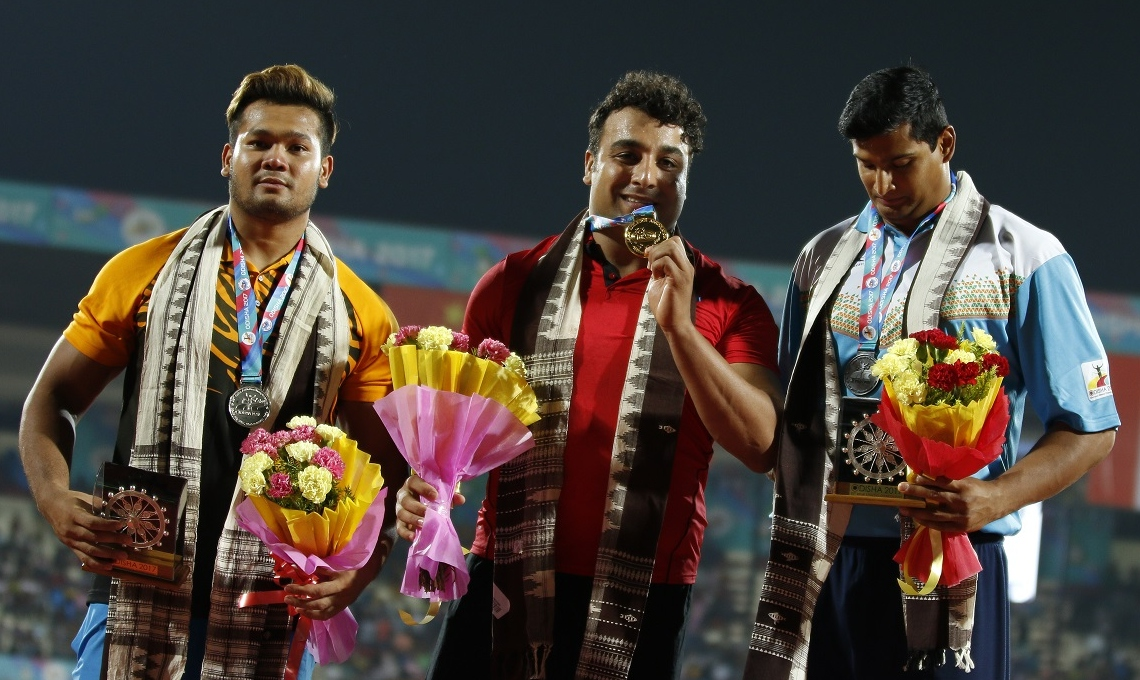
Left-right: Irfan, Haddadi, Gowda

The men's discus throw at the 2017 Asian Athletics Championships was held on 6 July.

== Results ==
Rank	Name	Nationality	#1	#2	#3	#4	#5	#6	Result	Notes
1st place, gold medalist(s)	Ehsan Haddadi	Iran	61.67	61.80	63.76	63.55	x	64.54	64.54	
2nd place, silver medalist(s)	Muhammad Irfan	Malaysia	50.93	50.83	57.53	x	60.96	x	60.96	
3rd place, bronze medalist(s)	Vikas Gowda	India	54.66	58.96	59.41	60.81	x	58.98	60.81	
4	Mustafa Kadhim	Iraq	57.84	57.26	59.54	59.64	59.70	60.30	60.30	
5	Mohammad Samimi	Iran	55.42	59.18	x	59.80	x	x	59.80	
6	Essa Al-Zenkawi	Kuwait	56.24	57.73	58.11	x	58.28	55.09	58.28	
7	Sultan Al-Dawoodi	Saudi Arabia	57.96	x	x	57.23	57.06	57.12	57.96	
8	Yevgeniy Milovatskiy	Kazakhstan	57.00	x	55.65	56.48	56.41	x	57.00	
9	Masateru Yugami	Japan	56.31	55.68	56.66				56.66	
10	Zhang Mengjie	China	56.19	55.95	56.09				56.19	
11	Dharamraj Yadav	India	53.12	53.92	54.53				54.53	
12	Mohamed Ibrahim Moaaz	Qatar	54.49	x	53.83				54.49	
13	Kirpal Singh	India	53.60	x	53.64				53.64	
14	Shigeyuki Maisawa	Japan	x	50.44	52.45				52.45	
15	Osama Hassan	Saudi Arabia	x	x	45.89				45.89	
16	Dan Lal	Myanmar	39.79	40.68	39.84				40.68	
