= Athletics at the 2026 Asian Games – Men's discus throw =

Men's discus throw at the 2026 Asian Games
- Venue: Mizuho Park Athletic Stadium, Nagoya
- Date: 24 September 2026
- Competitors: 11 from 8 nations
- Winning distance: 64.26 m

Medalists
gold medal	Abuduaini Tuergong	China
silver medal	Wu Nanjun	China
bronze medal	Sadegh Samimishalamzari	Iran

The men's discus throw competition at the 2026 Asian Games took place on 24 September 2026 at the Mizuho Park Athletic Stadium in Nagoya, Japan. Abuduaini Tuergong of China won the gold medal with a throw of 64.26 metres, while Wu Nanjun of China and Sadegh Samimishalamzari of Iran won the silver and bronze medals respectively.

== Schedule ==
All times are Japan Standard Time (UTC+09:00)

Schedule
Date	Time	Event
24 September 2026	17:25	Final

== Records ==
Prior to this competition, the existing world, Asian and Games records were as follows.

World Record	Mykolas Alekna (LTU)	75.56	Ramona, United States	12 April 2025
Asian Record	Ehsan Hadadi (IRI)	69.32	Tallinn, Estonia	5 March 2008
Games Record	Ehsan Hadadi (IRI)	67.99	Guangzhou, China	23 November 2010

== Results ==
Rank	Athlete	Attempt						Result	Notes
Rank	Athlete	1	2	3	4	5	6	Result	Notes
1st place, gold medalist(s)	Abuduaini Tuergong (CHN)	60.29	61.85	64.26	62.08	64.25	63.03	64.26	
2nd place, silver medalist(s)	Wu Nanjun (CHN)	61.58	58.06	58.71	60.55	X	50.40	61.58	
3rd place, bronze medalist(s)	Sadegh Samimi Shalamzari (IRI)	58.76	58.47	60.32	58.39	57.75	58.62	60.32	PB
4	Tsutsumi Yuji (JPN)	X	X	59.82	X	X	X	59.82	
5	Ibrahim Moaaz (QAT)	58.17	57.68	59.39	X	X	X	59.39	
6	Yugami Masateru (JPN)	57.41	56.81	57.86	58.53	58.26	57.77	58.53	
7	Nurillaev Azizbek (UZB)	58.19	X	57.79	58.16	56.18	X	58.19	
8	Zankawi Abdullah (KUW)	55.56	53.92	56.51	56.39	56.38	56.87	56.87	PB
9	Zankawi Eissa (KUW)	56.45	54.72	X				56.45	
10	Shamsh Muhammad (MAS)	56.25	56.37	56.29				56.37	
11	Mustafa Kadhim (IRQ)	54.16	X	52.32				54.16	
