= Athletics at the 2022 Asian Games – Men's discus throw =

Men's discus throw at the 2022 Asian Games
- Venue: Hangzhou Olympic Expo Main Stadium
- Date: 2 October 2023
- Competitors: 11 from 10 nations

Medalists
gold medal	Hossein Rasouli	Iran
silver medal	Ehsan Haddadi	Iran
bronze medal	Abuduaini Tuergong	China

The men's discus throw competition at the 2022 Asian Games took place on 2 October 2023 at the HOC Stadium, Hangzhou.

== Schedule ==
All times are China Standard Time (UTC+08:00)

Date	Time	Event
Monday, 2 October 2023	19:40	Final

== Records ==
Prior to this competition, the existing world, Asian and Games records were as follows.

World Record	Jürgen Schult (GDR)	74.08	Neubrandenburg, East Germany	6 June 1986
Asian Record	Ehsan Haddadi (IRI)	69.32	Tallinn, Estonia	3 June 2008
Games Record	Ehsan Haddadi (IRI)	67.99	Guangzhou, China	24 November 2010

== Results ==
Rank	Athlete	Attempt						Result	Notes
Rank	Athlete	1	2	3	4	5	6	Result	Notes
1st place, gold medalist(s)	Hossein Rasouli (IRI)	59.48	58.41	60.63	62.04	61.46	57.61	62.04	
2nd place, silver medalist(s)	Ehsan Haddadi (IRI)	58.39	61.82	X	60.40	59.02	57.54	61.82	
3rd place, bronze medalist(s)	Abuduaini Tuergong (CHN)	56.96	59.81	X	60.43	61.19	X	61.19	
4	Moaaz Mohamed Ibrahim (QAT)	57.30	60.77	X	X	X	59.96	60.77	
5	Essa Al-Zenkawi (KUW)	59.95	60.13	57.80	59.22	X	59.99	60.13	
6	Irfan Shamsuddin (MAS)	57.15	54.45	56.11	58.00	X	58.94	58.94	
7	Musaeb Al-Momani (JOR)	51.96	53.37	53.24	53.43	51.29	54.79	54.79	
8	Marawan Medany (BRN)	51.65	53.34	54.65	52.18	52.70	54.04	54.65	
9	Kiadpradid Srisai (THA)	47.72	X	51.59				51.59	
10	Kim Il-hyeon (KOR)	48.62	X	X				48.62	
11	Sim Samedy (CAM)	39.12	X	X				39.12	
