= Toshiki =

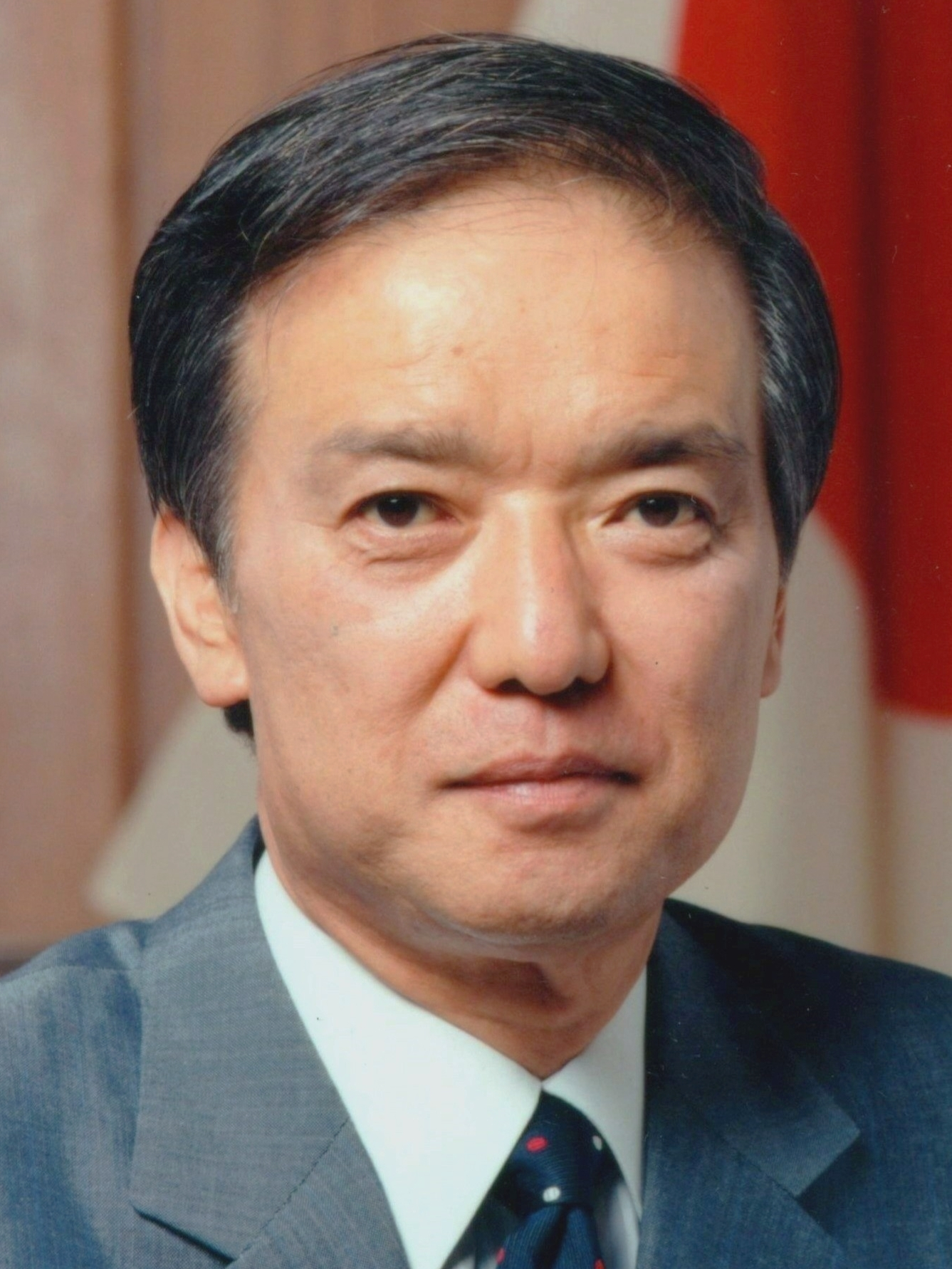
- Toshiki Kaifu (1931–2020), Japanese politician who served as the 77th Prime Minister of Japan from 1989 to 1991.
- Pronunciation: toɕikʲi (IPA)
- Gender: Male

Origin
- Origin: Japanese
- Meaning: Different meanings depending on the kanji used

Other names
- Alternative spelling: Tosiki (Kunrei-shiki) Tosiki (Nihon-shiki) Toshiki (Hepburn)

Toshiki is a masculine Japanese given name.

== Written forms ==
Toshiki can be written using different combinations of kanji characters. Some examples:

- 敏樹, "agile, tree"
- 敏生, "agile, birth"
- 敏喜, "agile, rejoice"
- 敏起, "agile, to rise"
- 敏機, "agile, opportunity"
- 敏輝, "agile, to shine"
- 敏基, "agile, foundation"
- 俊樹, "talented, tree"
- 俊喜, "talented, rejoice"
- 俊輝, "talented, to shine"
- 利樹, "benefit, tree"
- 寿樹, "long life, tree"
- 寿輝, "long life, to shine"
- 淑樹, "graceful, tree"
- 年希, "year, to hope"

The name can also be written in hiragana としき or katakana トシキ.

== Notable people with the name ==
- Toshiki Abe (阿部 寿樹; born 1989), Japanese baseball player
- Toshiki Chino (千野 俊樹; born 1985), Japanese footballer
- Toshiki Chiyonokuni (千代の国 憲輝; born 1990), Japanese sumo wrestler
- Toshiki Hirano (平野 俊貴; born 1956), Japanese anime director
- Toshiki Inoue (井上 敏樹; born 1959), Japanese screenwriter
- Toshiki Kadomatsu (角松 敏生; born 1960), Japanese musician
- Toshiki Kaifu (海部 俊樹; 1931–2022), Japanese politician and the Prime Minister of Japan
- Toshiki Koike (小池 知己; born 1974), Japanese footballer
- Toshiki Masui (桝井 俊樹; born 1969), Japanese equestrian
- Toshiki Okada (岡田 利規; born 1973), Japanese playwright, theatre director and writer
- Toshiki Ozawa (小澤 俊樹; born 1932), Japanese photographer
- Toshiki Satō (佐藤 俊喜; born 1961), Japanese film director and screenwriter
- Toshiki Takahashi (footballer) (高橋 利樹; born 1998), Japanese footballer
- Toshiki Yamamoto (山本 俊樹, born 1991), Japanese weightlifter
- Toshiki Yoshioka (吉岡 稔記; born 1976), Japanese drifting driver
- Toshiki Yui (唯 登詩樹; born 1956), Japanese manga artist
