= Essa Al-Zenkawi =

Kuwaiti discus thrower (born 1992)

Essa Mohammed Al-Zenkawi
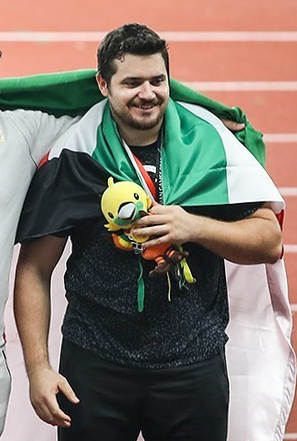
- Al-Zankawi at the 2018 Asian Games

Personal information
- Born: 17 October 1992 (age 33)

Sport
- Country: Kuwait
- Sport: Track and field
- Event: Discus throw

Achievements and titles
- Personal best: 63.22 m (2015)
Medal record
Representing Kuwait
Asian Games
Bronze medal – third place	2018 Jakarta	Discus throw

Essa Mohammed Gharib Al-Zankawi (born 17 October 1992) is a Kuwaiti/Hungarian athlete in Kuwait’s national Athletics team specializing in Discus throw. He competed at the 2015 World Championships in Beijing without qualifying for the final. He won a silver medal at the 2015 Asian Championships and a bronze at the 2018 Asian Games, where he served as the flag bearer for Kuwait at the opening ceremony.

== Competition record ==
Year	Competition	Venue	Position	Event	Notes
Representing Kuwait
2009	World Youth Championships	Brixen, Italy	21st (q)	Discus throw (1.5 kg)	52.11 m
2010	World Junior Championships	Moncton, Canada	17th (q)	Discus throw (1.75 kg)	54.90 m
2010	West Asian Championships	Aleppo, Syria	6th	Discus throw	54.99 m
2010	Asian Games	Guangzhou, China	8th	Discus throw	54.19 m
2011	Arab Championships	Al Ain, United Arab Emirates	2nd	Discus throw	54.96 m
2011	Pan Arab Games	Doha, Qatar	6th	Discus throw	55.89 m
2012	West Asian Championships	Dubai, United Arab Emirates	5th	Discus throw	53.97 m
2013	Arab Championships	Doha, Qatar	5th	Discus throw	59.13 m
2013	Asian Championships	Pune, India	8th	Discus throw	56.96 m
2013	Islamic Solidarity Games	Palembang, Indonesia	8th	Discus throw	54.10 m
2014	Asian Games	Incheon, South Korea	9th	Discus throw	56.57 m
2015	Arab Championships	Isa Town, Bahrain	1st	Discus throw	63.22 m
2015	Asian Championships	Wuhan, China	2nd	Discus throw	61.57 m
2015	World Championships	Beijing, China	27th (q)	Discus throw	58.68 m
2017	Asian Championships	Bhubaneswar, India	6th	Discus throw	58.28 m
2018	Asian Games	Jakarta, Indonesia	3rd	Discus throw	59.44 m
2021	Arab Championships	Radès, Tunisia	1st	Discus throw	60.25 m
2022	GCC Games	Kuwait City, Kuwait	1st	Discus throw	60.20 m
2022	Islamic Solidarity Games	Konya, Turkey	1st	Discus throw	62.03 m
2023	West Asian Championships	Doha, Qatar	2nd	Discus throw	59.66 m
2023	Arab Championships	Marrakesh, Morocco	1st	Discus throw	59.20 m
2023	Arab Games	Oran, Algeria	2nd	Discus throw	61.48 m
2023	Asian Championships	Bangkok, Thailand	2nd	Discus throw	60.23 m
2023	Asian Games	Hangzhou, China	5th	Discus throw	60.13 m
2024	West Asian Championships	Basra, Iraq	1st	Discus throw	61.32 m
2025	Arab Championships	Oran, Algeria	2nd	Discus throw	59.72 m
2025	Asian Championships	Gumi, South Korea	6th	Discus throw	57.26 m
2025	Islamic Solidarity Games	Riyadh, Saudi Arabia	2nd	Discus throw	57.72 m
2026	GCC Games	Doha, Qatar	1st	Discus throw	59.74 m
