= Abuduaini Tuergong =

Chinese discus thrower

Personal information
- Native name: 阿卜杜艾尼·图尔贡
- Born: 16 June 1997 (age 29) Shufu County, Kashgar Prefecture, Xinjiang, China
- Education: Xinjiang Normal University
- Height: 2.03 m (6 ft 8 in)

Sport
- Country: China
- Sport: Athletics
- Event: Discus throw

Achievements and titles
- Personal best: 67.29 NR(2025)
Medal record
Men's athletics
Representing China
Asian Games
Gold medal – first place	2026 Aichi–Nagoya	Discus throw
Bronze medal – third place	2022 Hangzhou	Discus throw
Asian Championships
Gold medal – first place	2023 Bangkok	Discus throw
Gold medal – first place	2025 Gumi	Discus throw
National Games of China
Gold medal – first place	2021 Shaanxi	Discus throw

Abuduaini Tuergong (also known as Abdughani Turghun; born 16 June 1997) is a Chinese discus thrower. He won gold medals in the discus throw event of the 2023 Asian Athletics Championships and 2025 Asian Athletics Championships.

== Background ==
Tuergong was born in Shufu Country in Xinjiang province. He was born to a Uyghur family where his parents were farmers. He has two sibling where he is the eldest child.

Ever since he was a child, he had always been taller than his peers. When he was seven or eight years old, every weekend of holiday, after finishing his homework he would help his parents by working in the fields.

Tuergong would later move to Hebei province to train full time as an athlete and could only return home occasionally.

In 2022, Tuergong's father died due to illness. His father's biggest wish was for his son to achieve great results in competition.

Tuergong is coached by Tulake Nuermaimaiti, another Uyghur discus thrower who represented China and won a bronze medal in the discus throw event of the 2002 Asian Athletics Championships. The two compete together at domestic competitions in China.

== Career ==
On 25 September 2021, Tuergong obtained a gold medal in the discus throw event of the 2021 National Games of China with a score of 60.58 meters.

On 15 July 2023, Tuergong obtained a gold medal in the discus throw event of the 2023 Asian Athletics Championships with a score of 61.19 meters.

On 2 October 2023, Tuergong obtained a bronze medal in the discus throw event of the 2022 Asian Games with a score of 61.19 meters.

In recent years, Tuergong is the only male discus thrower in China who can consistently achieve results above 60 meters. He also currently holds the national record of 67.29m.
