= Toshiki Ozawa =

Japanese photographer

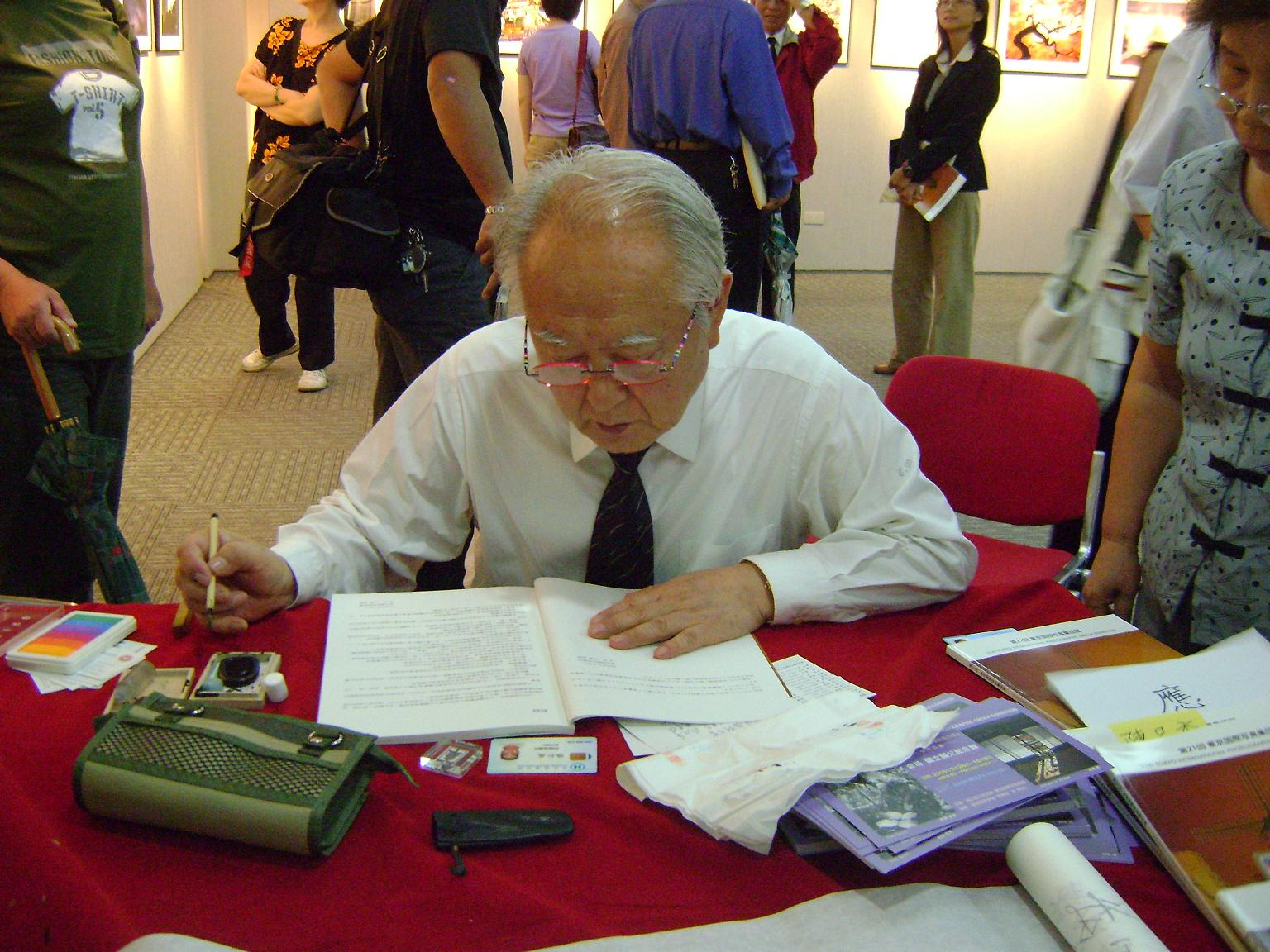
- Toshiki Ozawa in Taipei, 2008
- Born: 1932; Tokyo, Japan
- Died: 2014 (aged 81–82)
- Other name: 小澤俊樹
- Occupation: Photographer

Toshiki Ozawa (小澤俊樹, Ozawa Toshiki) (1932–2014) was a Japanese photographer.

== Career ==
In 1945, Ozawa started photography, developing and printing monochrome photos. In 1953, he was apprenticed under Keizo Nagahama while studying in the Department of Arts of Nihon University.

In 1954, his work was accepted at the 28th Kokuten (a national art exhibition in Japan) for the first time, and it has been continually accepted ever since. Ozawa has since become a Friend of Kokuten, meaning that his work is no longer submitted to the screening committee.

In 1961, he started the development and printing of color photos while working for Konica. From 1972 to 1992, he was a part-time lecturer in the Department of Arts of Nihon University; he was in charge of a special photographic techniques class. In 1973, he became a member of Kokuten.

In 1988, Ozawa started the production of creative computer art photography. In 1991, he established the Tokyo International Photographic Group and started holding overseas exchange exhibitions. He sponsored 19 group exhibitions in countries including Lithuania, Poland, Slovenia, China, Taiwan, and the Netherlands.

In 1992, he started holding more than 60 solo exhibitions in major cities in Japan (including Tokyo, Nagoya, Osaka, Fukuoka, and Sapporo) and abroad (in the United States, Russia, Turkey, India, Italy, Latvia, Lithuania, and Poland). In 1994, he was invited to the International Conference of FIAP and held a joint exhibition with Franco Fontana in a special venue in Andorra, displaying 100 prints entitled "Overseas Sketches" produced by creative computer art photography.

In 1996, he was invited to the FAPA conference commemorating the 30th year of its founding. He exhibited the "Overseas Sketches" prints in a special venue in Hong Kong. Forty of the prints were arranged on the cover of a catalogue commemorating this international conference. Ozawa acted as a judge at the fourth Austrian Super Circuit International Salon. One year later, he organized the Contemporary Japanese Arts Group and sponsored overseas exhibitions displaying comprehensive modern arts of Japan (including painting, woodblock print, sculpture, crafts, and photography).

In 2003, Ozawa acted as a judge at the First Caribbean International Photography Touring Exhibition (Dominican Republic). In 2005, he acted as a judge at the 14th Austrian Super Circuit International Salon. Also in 2005, he sponsored the 18th Tokyo International Photographic Group Exhibition, held at Kaunas Fuji Photo Gallery in Lithuania as an event of the Japan-European Union Exchange Year. The catalogues printed were sent to countries in the European Union to help introduce the works of Japanese photographers.

In 2006, an album of Ozawa's works was published in Lithuania.

== Personal exhibitions ==
- 1998: held at the Contemporary Japanese Arts Group at the National Museum "Manggha" in Kraków, Poland
- 1999: held at the National Museum of Modern History in Ljubljana, Slovenia
- 2000: held at the Art Gallery "KI" in Ginza, Tokyo
- 2004-2005: touring exhibition, held at Kaunas Fuji Photo Gallery in Lithuania
- 2006: "Etude Nude 2", held at the Gallery Milfoto in Minsk, Belarus. The catalogues were printed there.
- 2006-2007: touring exhibition, "Journey of Pastel Colors", held at Kaunas Fuji Photo Gallery and major cities in Lithuania
- 2007: "Overseas Sketches", held at Pune State Art Gallery in India
- 2007: "Journey in Pastel Colors 2", held at the Kaunas Fujifilm Gallery in Lithuania
- 2008: "Journey in Pastel Colors 2", held at the Museum of History in Lithuania
- 2008: "Overseas Sketches" and "Paired Expression", held at Setagaya Museum in Tokyo Publications

== Awards ==
- 1955: received an award at the Popular Photography International Exhibition in New York
- 1956: Kokuten 30th Anniversary Prize
- 1961: Canon Prize
- 1963: Kokuten Friend Excellence Prize
- 1990: granted title of ESFIAP from The International Federation of Photographic Art (FIAP)
- 2006: Honorary title of America (PSA) as one of the 14 most active photographers in the world

== Publications ==
- "Toshhiki Ozawa" Part I (Etude Nude)
- II (Overseas Sketches)
- III (Paired Expression + Overseas Sketches)
- IV (Journey in Pastel Colors)
- V (Etude Nude 2)
- VI (Journey in Pastel Colors 2)

== Prints in collections ==
Prints by Ozawa are in the collections of these institutions:

- Manggha National Museum (Kraków, Poland)
- National Museum of Modern History (Ljubljana, Slovenia)
- FIAP Library (Netherlands)
- National Lithuanian Photographers Union (Lithuania)
- Bengal Photographic Society (India)
- Nihon University Arts Department (Tokyo)

== Memberships and honours ==
He is a member of Kokugakai (Kokuten), international representative and life member of PSA, life member of Royal Photographic Society, honorary life member of Photographic Society of Bengal (India), Japanese Representative of Pakistan Photographic Association, honorary member of Latvian Photo Artist Society and National Association of Lithuanian Photographers, Chairman of Le Photo-Club Arc-en-Ciel, Tokyo International Photographic Group and Contemporary Japanese Arts Group, director and president of Photo Tech Ltd.

== Sources ==
- 21st Tokyo International Photographic Group Exhibition. (2008). Catalogue. pp. 76–77.
- "Toshiki OZAWA (Japonija) - Pastelinių spalvų kelionė, 2006". (in Lithuanian)
- Ozawa, Toshiki (May 1998). "Computer art photography - making fictional photographs". PSA Journal. 64 (5). Archived from the original on 2004-09-29.
- http://www.artexhibitions.in/archives/toshiki/toshiki_exibition.html
- Kiaušas, Vidmantas (2004) "Toshiki Ozawa ir Lietuva". Nemunas, nr. (17-458) (in Lithuanian)
