= Mustafa Kadhim =

Iraqi discus thrower (born 1995)

Mustafa Al-Saamah
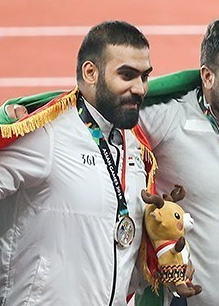
- Al-Saamah at the 2018 Asian Games

Personal information
- Full name: Mustafa Kadhim Dagher Al-Saamah
- Born: 29 November 1995 (age 30) Basra, Iraq
- Height: 195 cm (6 ft 5 in)
- Weight: 135 kg (298 lb)

Sport
- Sport: Athletics
- Event: Discus throw
- Coached by: Hani Abdul Walid

Achievements and titles
- Personal bests: 60.89 m (2017, NR)
Medal record
Representing Iraq
Asian Games
| Silver medal – second place | 2018 Jakarta | Discus throw |

Mustafa Kadhim Dagher Al-Saamah (born 29 November 1995) is an Iraqi athlete specialising in the discus throw. He represented his country at the 2017 World Championships without reaching the final. He won a silver medal at the 2018 Asian Games.

== International competitions ==
| Year | Competition | Venue | Position | Event | Notes |
Representing Iraq
| 2012 | Arab Junior Championships | Amman, Jordan | 1st | Discus throw (1.75 kg) | 52.14 m |
| 2013 | Arab Championships | Doha, Qatar | 7th | Discus throw | 51.48 m |
| 2014 | Arab Junior Championships | Cairo, Egypt | 1st | Discus throw (1.75 kg) | 59.52 m |
| 2014 | Asian Junior Championships | Taipei, Taiwan | 1st | Discus throw (1.75 kg) | 59.35 m |
| 2014 | Asian Games | Incheon, South Korea | 10th | Discus throw | 55.21 m |
| 2015 | Arab Championships | Isa Town, Bahrain | 3rd | Discus throw | 60.60 m |
| 2017 | Islamic Solidarity Games | Baku, Azerbaijan | 1st | Discus throw | 60.89 m |
| 2017 | Asian Championships | Bhubaneswar, India | 4th | Discus throw | 60.30 m |
| 2017 | World Championships | London, United Kingdom | 27th (q) | Discus throw | 58.40 m |
| 2018 | Asian Games | Jakarta, Indonesia | 2nd | Discus throw | 60.09 m |
| 2024 | West Asian Championships | Basra, Iraq | 3rd | Discus throw | 55.10 m |
| 2025 | Asian Championships | Gumi, South Korea | 13th | Discus throw | 51.34 m |
| 2025 | Islamic Solidarity Games | Riyadh, Saudi Arabia | 3rd | Discus throw | 57.11 m |
