= Irfan Shamsuddin =

Malaysian discus thrower

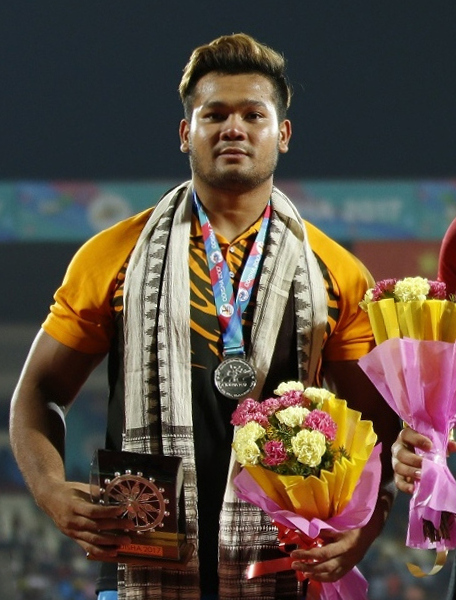
- Irfan at the 2017 Asian Championships

Personal information
- Full name: Muhammad Irfan bin Shamsuddin
- Nationality: Malaysian
- Born: 16 August 1995 (age 30) Negeri Sembilan
- Education: University of Malaya
- Height: 190 cm (6 ft 3 in)

Sport
- Sport: Athletics
- Event: Discus throw

Achievements and titles
- Personal best: 62.55 (2017)
Medal record
Representing Malaysia
Asian Athletics Championships
Silver medal – second place	2017 Bhubaneswar	Discus
Bronze medal – third place	2023 Bangkok	{{{2}}}
Bronze medal – third place	2025 Gumi	Discus
Southeast Asian Games
Gold medal – first place	2013 Naypyidaw	Discus
Gold medal – first place	2015 Singapore	Discus
Gold medal – first place	2017 Kuala Lumpur	Discus
Gold medal – first place	2019 Philippines	Discus
Gold medal – first place	2021 Hanoi	Discus
Gold medal – first place	2023 Phnom Penh	Discus
Gold medal – first place	2025 Bangkok	Discus

Muhammad Irfan bin Shamsuddin (born 16 August 1995) is a Malaysian discus thrower who won a silver medal at the 2017 Asian Championships. He placed 12th and 5th at the 2014 and 2018 Asian Games, respectively.
