= Masoud Kamran =

Iranian hurdler (born 1999)

Personal information
- Born: 16 October 1999 (age 26) Kashan, Iran

Sport
- Sport: Athletics
- Event: 100 metres hurdles

Achievements and titles
- Personal bests: 7.89 s NR

Masoud Kamran (Persian: مسعود کامران; born 16 October 1999) is an Iranian athlete specialising in the 100 metres hurdles. He has won the gold medal in the 2022 Iranian Athletics Championships.

== Sporting career ==
Masoud Kamran gained his first international experience in 2022 when he finished fifth in the 100 metres hurdles at the Islamic Solidarity Games in Konya in 13.74 s. The following year, he was disqualified in the first round of the 60 m hurdles at the Asian Indoor Championships in Astana and in 2024 he missed the final at the Asian Indoor Championships in Tehran with a time of 7.89 s.

In 2021 and 2022, Kamran became Iranian champion in the 110-meter hurdles.

=== International competitions ===
- (gold) in Iran athletics competition (2021.2022.2023)
- (gold) Arak Grand Prix Championship 2021
- (gold) National Championship in Tehran
- (silver) of the international indoor competition in Turkey
- (gold) Champion of the Asian tournament of Kazanov Cup in Kazakhstan
- (gold) Turkish international championship in Izmir
- (gold) The championship of the international selection competition of the Turkish Olympic Games in Izmir
- (gold) Basra West Iraq Asian Championship

== Allegations of sexual assault ==
In June 2025, Masoud Kamran and Amir Moradi, the coach of the Iranian national athletics team, along with a national athlete named Hossein Rasouli, were arrested during the Asian Athletics Championships in Gumi, South Korea, on charges of sexually assaulting a 20-year-old Korean woman. According to reports, the three men met the woman at a bar, took her to a hotel near the athletes' village, and allegedly assaulted her. South Korean police arrested them at the scene following the complaint. The investigation is ongoing.
