= Masateru Yugami =

Japanese discus thrower (born 1993)

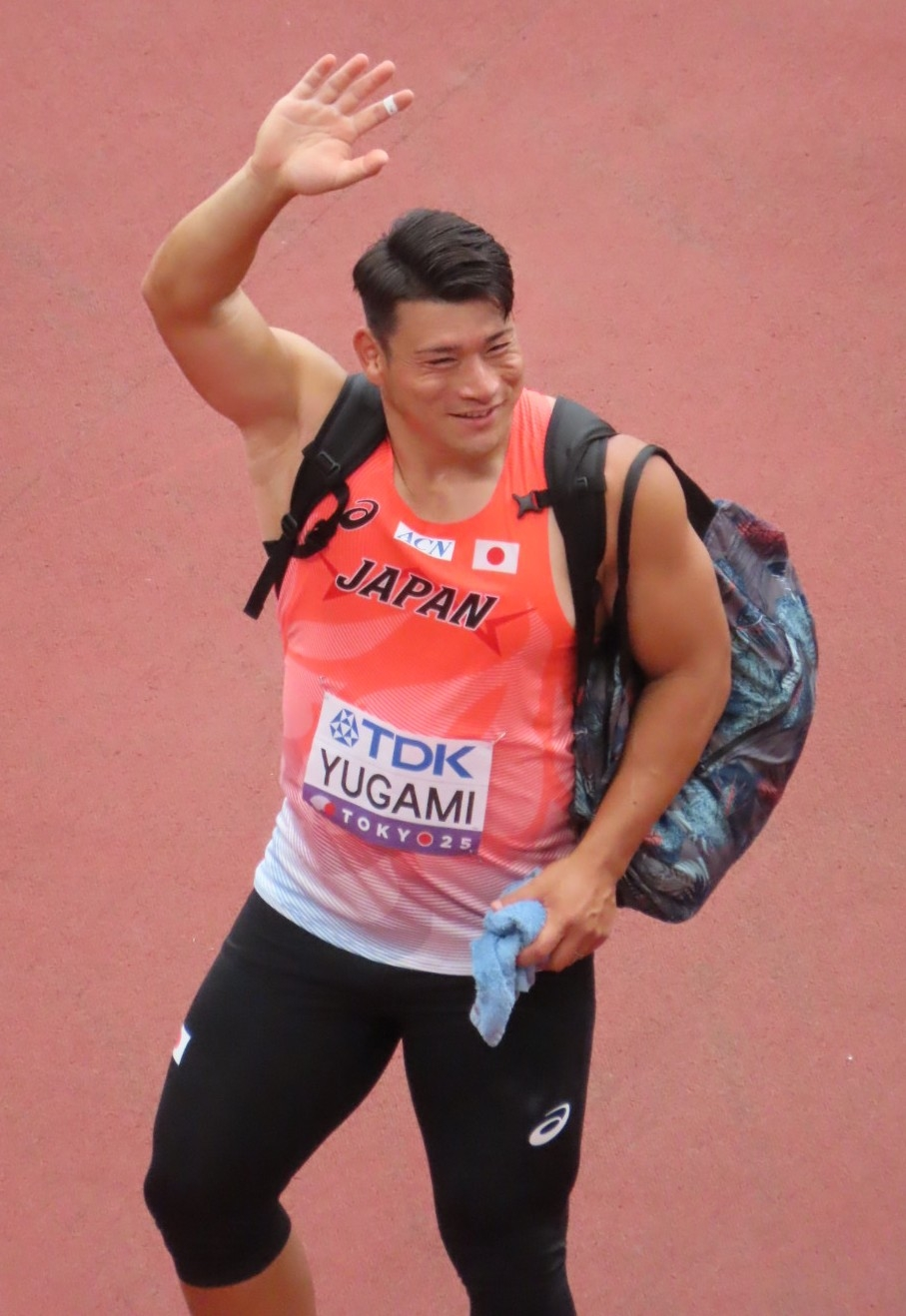
- Yugami at the 2025 World Athletics Championships

Personal information
- Born: 14 April 1993 (age 33) Kōka, Shiga, Japan

Sport
- Country: Japan
- Sport: Track and field
- Event: Discus throw
Medal record
Men's athletics
Representing Japan
Deaflympics
| Gold medal – first place | 2025 Tokyo | Discus throw |
| Silver medal – second place | 2017 Samsun | Discus throw |
Asian Championships
| Silver medal – second place | 2025 Gumi | Discus throw |

Masateru Yugami (湯上 剛輝, Yugami Masateru; born 14 April 1993) is a Japanese discus thrower. He has won medals at the Asian Athletics Championships and the Summer Deaflympics.

== Early life ==
Born in Kōka, Shiga, Yugami was diagnosed with congenital hearing loss shortly after birth and underwent cochlear implant surgery in the sixth grade of elementary school.

== Career ==
Yugami began competing in throwing events in track and field at Shiga Prefectural Moriyama High School and distinguished himself in the discus throw while attending Chukyo University. After joining Toyota Motor Corporation, he represented Japan at the 2017 Summer Deaflympics, winning a silver medal with a throw of 55.58 meters.

In June 2018, at the 102nd Japan Championships in Athletics, Yugami set a new Japanese record of 61.02 m with his third throw in the discus throw, becoming the first Japanese athlete to break the 61-meter barrier. He then broke the record again with 62.03 m with his fourth throw and 62.16 m with his fifth throw. The Japanese discus throw entered a long period of stagnation after Kiyotaka Kawasaki recorded 60.22 m, and it took nearly 40 years for the Japanese record to be broken until Yuji Tsutsumi broke it with 60.37 m in 2017. Yugami broke Tsutsumi's record in less than a year (and it was broken again by Tsutsumi in March 2020). This record is also a world deaf record. He was selected for the Japanese national team for the first time at the 2018 Asian Games, where he placed sixth with a throw of 57.62 m.

On April 26, 2025, Yugami broke Japan's record for the first time in five years with a throw of 64.48 m at the Oklahoma Throw Challenge. On May 29 of the same year, he won a silver medal at the Asian Athletics Championships. It was the first medal for Japan in the event in 34 years. He was selected to represent Japan at the 2025 Summer Deaflympics, where he won the gold medal.
