= Hamideh Esmaeilnejad =

Iranian sprinter (born 1997)

Personal information
- Native name: حمیده اسماعیل‌نژاد
- Born: 23 July 1997 (age 28) Sabzevar, Razavi Khorasan province, Iran
- Education: Psychology
- Height: 1.66 m (5 ft 5 1/2 in)
- Weight: 56 kg (123 lb)

Sport
- Country: Iran
- Sport: Track and field: Sprint
- Events: 60 metres; 100 metres; 200 metres; 4 × 100 metres relay

Achievements and titles
- Personal bests: 60 m – 7.36 100 m – 11.33 NR 200 m – 24.36

Hamideh Esmaeilnejad (Persian: حمیده اسماعیل‌نژاد; born 23 July 1997 in Sabzevar) is an Iranian sprinter. Esmaeilnejad has been a member of the Iranian women's national athletics team in the speed field since the junior age group, and in her record, she has won gold, silver and bronze medals in the 100m and 200m events. Also, she was able to break the Iranian women's 100-meter run record at the 8th International Sprint Relay Cup in Erzurum, and she set a record of 11.43 seconds higher than Farzaneh Fasihi.

Esmailnejad was able to set a record of 11.28 seconds in the Women's Athletics Grand Prix held in Tehran and win the gold medal ahead of Farzaneh Fasihi, but due to the high speed of the wind, her record was not recorded.

In the preliminary round of the 100m event of the Asian Athletics Championships, which was hosted by Bangkok, Thailand, she managed to improve the national record once again by registering a quorum of 11.33 seconds.

== Honors ==
- Bronze medal of Kazanov Cup of Kazakhstan in 100 meters (Almaty 2019)
- Silver medal of Kazanov Cup of Kazakhstan in 200 meters (Almaty 2019)
- Bronze medal of Kazanov Cup of Kazakhstan in 4 x 100 meters (Almaty 2019)
- Silver medal of the Asian Indoor Athletics Championship (Tehran 2020)
- Bronze medal of the 6th International Sprint & Relay Cup (Erzurum 2021)
- Bronze medal of the 8th International Sprint Relay Cup (Erzurum 2023)
- Breaking Iran's record in women's 100 m (by registering a time of 11.33 seconds at heats) (Bangkok 2024)
