= Hossein Rasouli =

Iranian discus thrower (born 1999)

Personal information
- Born: December 22, 1999 (age 26) Komijan, Iran

Sport
- Country: Iran
- Sport: Athletics
- Event: Discus

Achievements and titles
- Personal best: 62.62
Medal record
Representing Iran
Men's athletics
Asian Games
Gold medal – first place	2022 Hangzhou	Discus throw

Hossein Rasouli (Persian: حسین رسولی, born December 22, 1999) is an Iranian discus thrower. He became the champion of Asian Junior Athletics Championships in 2018. Rasouli became Iran 2022 Athletic Championships's runner-up after Ehsan Haddadi in 2022.

== Allegations of sexual assault ==
In June 2025, Hossein Rasouli and Amir Moradi, the coach of the Iranian national athletics team, along with a national athlete named Masoud Kamran, were arrested during the Asian Athletics Championships in Gumi, South Korea, on charges of sexually assaulting a 20-year-old Korean woman. According to reports, the three men met the woman at a bar, took her to a hotel near the athletes' village, and allegedly assaulted her. South Korean police arrested them at the scene following the complaint. The investigation is ongoing.
